= Members of the New South Wales Legislative Assembly, 1976–1978 =

Members of the New South Wales Legislative Assembly who served in the 45th parliament held their seats from 1976 to 1978. They were elected at the 1976 state election, and at by-elections. The Speaker was Laurie Kelly.

Name	Party	Electorate	Term in office
John Akister	Labor	Monaro	1976–1988
David Arblaster	Liberal	Mosman	1972–1984
Brian Bannon	Labor	Rockdale	1959–1986
Gordon Barnier	Labor	Blacktown	1971–1981
John Barraclough	Liberal	Bligh	1968–1981
Eric Bedford	Labor	Fairfield	1968–1985
Ken Booth	Labor	Wallsend	1960–1988
Jack Boyd	National Country	Byron	1973–1984
Laurie Brereton	Labor	Heffron	1970–1971, 1973–1990
Ron Brewer	National Country	Goulburn	1965–1984
Jim Brown	National Country	Raleigh	1959–1984
Tim Bruxner	National Country	Tenterfield	1962–1981
Tom Cahill	Labor	Marrickville	1959–1983
Jim Cameron	Liberal	Northcott	1968–1984
Fred Caterson (Note: The Hills Liberal MLA Max Ruddock resigned on 25 May 1976. Liberal candidate Fred Caterson won the resulting by-election on 9 October.)	Liberal	The Hills	1976–1990
Michael Cleary	Labor	Coogee	1974–1991
Jim Clough	Liberal	Eastwood	1956–1988
Mick Clough	Labor	Blue Mountains	1976–1988, 1991–1999
Peter Coleman	Liberal	Fuller	1968–1978
Bruce Cowan	National Country	Oxley	1965–1980
Peter Cox	Labor	Auburn	1965–1988
Bill Crabtree	Labor	Kogarah	1953–1983
Douglas Darby	Liberal	Manly	1945–1978
Don Day	Labor	Casino	1971–1984
Roger Degen	Labor	Balmain	1968–1984
John Dowd	Liberal	Lane Cove	1975–1991
Keith Doyle	Liberal	Vaucluse	1965–1978
Bruce Duncan	National Country	Lismore	1965–1988
Vince Durick	Labor	Lakemba	1964–1984
Syd Einfeld	Labor	Waverley	1965–1981
Richard Face	Labor	Charlestown	1972–2003
Jack Ferguson	Labor	Merrylands	1959–1984
Tim Fischer	National Country	Sturt	1971–1980, 1980–1984
Col Fisher	National Country	Upper Hunter	1970–1988
Pat Flaherty	Labor	Granville	1962–1984
Ken Gabb (Note: Earlwood Liberal MLA Eric Willis resigned on 16 June 1978. Labor candidate Ken Gabb won the resulting by-election on 15 July.)	Labor	Earlwood	1978–1988
Lin Gordon	Labor	Murrumbidgee	1970–1984
Ian Griffith	Liberal	Cronulla	1956–1978
Bill Haigh	Labor	Maroubra	1968–1983
John Hatton	Independent	South Coast	1973–1995
George Freudenstein	National Country	Young	1959–1981
Dick Healey	Liberal	Davidson	1962–1981
Pat Hills	Labor	Phillip	1954–1988
Merv Hunter	Labor	Lake Macquarie	1969–1991
John Jackett	Liberal	Burwood	1965–1978
Rex Jackson	Labor	Heathcote	1955–1986
Harry Jensen	Labor	Munmorah	1965–1981
Tony Johnson	Labor	Mount Druitt	1973–1983
Lew Johnstone	Labor	Broken Hill	1965–1981
Sam Jones	Labor	Waratah	1965–1984
Maurie Keane	Labor	Woronora	1973–1988
Nick Kearns	Labor	Bankstown	1962–1980
Laurie Kelly	Labor	Corrimal	1968–1988
David Leitch	National Country	Armidale	1973–1978
Tom Lewis (Note: Wollondilly Liberal MLA Tom Lewis resigned on 7 September 1978. No by-election was held due to the proximity of the 1978 state election.)	Liberal	Wollondilly	1957–1978
Gordon Mackie	Liberal	Albury	1965–1978
Michael Maher	Labor	Drummoyne	1973–1982
John Maddison	Liberal	Ku-ring-gai	1962–1980
Cliff Mallam	Labor	Campbelltown	1953–1968, 1971–1981
John Mason	Liberal	Dubbo	1965–1981
Bruce McDonald	Liberal	Kirribilli	1976–1981
Laurie McGinty (Note: Willoughby MLA Laurie McGinty was elected as a Liberal member, but resigned from the party in September 1977 after losing party preselection to recontest his seat at the 1978 state election. He served out his term as an independent.)	Liberal/Independent	Willoughby	1968–1978
Brian McGowan	Labor	Gosford	1976–1988
Mary Meillon	Liberal	Murray	1973–1980
Tim Moore	Liberal	Gordon	1976–1992
Milton Morris	Liberal	Maitland	1956–1980
Ron Mulock	Labor	Penrith	1971–1988
Wal Murray	National Country	Barwon	1976–1995
Lerryn Mutton	Liberal	Yaralla	1968–1978
George Neilly (Note: Cessnock Labor MLA George Neilly resigned on 8 September 1978. No by-election was held due to the proximity of the 1978 state election.)	Labor	Cessnock	1959–1978
Keith O'Connell	Labor	Peats	1971–1984
Clive Osborne	National Country	Bathurst	1967–1981
George Paciullo	Labor	Liverpool	1971–1989
Noel Park	National Country	Tamworth	1973–1991
George Petersen	Labor	Illawarra	1968–1988
Neil Pickard	Liberal	Hornsby	1973–1991
Leon Punch	National Country	Gloucester	1959–1985
Ernie Quinn	Labor	Wentworthville	1962–1988
Eric Ramsay	Labor	Wollongong	1971–1984
Jack Renshaw	Labor	Castlereagh	1941–1980
Ron Rofe	Liberal	Nepean	1973–1978
Pat Rogan	Labor	East Hills	1973–1999
Kevin Rozzoli	Liberal	Hawkesbury	1973–2003
Max Ruddock	Liberal	The Hills	1962–1976
Kevin Ryan	Labor	Hurstville	1976–1984
Joe Schipp	Liberal	Wagga Wagga	1975–1999
Terry Sheahan	Labor	Burrinjuck	1973–1988
Matt Singleton	National Country	Clarence	1971–1990
Kevin Stewart	Labor	Canterbury	1962–1985
Jim Taylor	National Country	Temora	1960–1981
Allan Viney	Liberal	Wakehurst	1971–1978
Arthur Wade	Labor	Newcastle	1968–1988
Frank Walker	Labor	Georges River	1970–1988
Tim Walker	Liberal	Miranda	1968–1978
Garry West	National Country	Orange	1976–1996
Paul Whelan	Labor	Ashfield	1976–2003
Bruce Webster (Note: Pittwater Liberal MLA Bruce Webster resigned on 21 July 1978. No by-election was held due to the proximity of the 1978 state election.)	Liberal	Pittwater	1975–1978
Barry Wilde	Labor	Parramatta	1976–1988
Sir Eric Willis	Liberal	Earlwood	1950–1978
Roger Wotton	National Country	Burrendong	1968–1971, 1973–1991
Neville Wran	Labor	Bass Hill	1973–1986

== See also ==
- First Wran ministry
- Results of the 1976 New South Wales state election (Legislative Assembly)
- Candidates of the 1976 New South Wales state election
