= Results of the 1976 New South Wales state election (Legislative Assembly) =

State election for New South Wales, Australia in May 1976

New South Wales state election, 1 May 1976 Legislative Assembly << 1973–1978 >>
Enrolled voters	2,943,248 (Note: There were 2,989,786 enrolled voters but 46,538 were enrolled in electorates (one Labor and one Country) which were uncontested at the election.)				
Votes cast	2,745,749		Turnout	93.29	+0.78
Informal votes	48,220		Informal	1.76	–0.94
Summary of votes by party
Party	Primary votes	%	Swing	Seats	Change
Labor	1,342,038	49.75	+6.82	50	+ 6
Liberal	978,886	36.29	+2.44	30	– 4
Country	270,603	10.03	–0.45	18	± 0
Workers	15,598	0.58	+0.58	0	± 0
Australia	7,407	0.27	–3.93	0	± 0
Socialist Workers	2,495	0.09	+0.09	0	± 0
Communist	2,220	0.08	+0.05	0	± 0
Democratic Labor	2,201	0.08	–5.88	0	– 1
Independent	76,089	2.82	+0.28	1	– 1
Total	2,697,529			99	

This is a list of electoral district results for the 1976 New South Wales state election.

== Results by Electoral district ==
=== Albury ===
1976 New South Wales state election: Albury
Party	Candidate	Votes	%	±%
Liberal	Gordon Mackie	13,195	58.2	+1.5
Labor	Kevin Esler	9,498	41.8	+6.8
Total formal votes		22,693	98.4	+0.1
Informal votes		361	1.6	−0.1
Turnout		23,054	92.2	−0.7
Liberal hold		Swing	−6.2	

=== Armidale ===
1976 New South Wales state election: Armidale
Party	Candidate	Votes	%	±%
Country	David Leitch	13,078	56.6	−3.1
Labor	Hubert Legge	10,024	43.4	+7.2
Total formal votes		23,102	98.7	0.0
Informal votes		297	1.3	0.0
Turnout		23,399	93.0	−1.4
Country hold		Swing	−6.4	

=== Ashfield ===
1976 New South Wales state election: Ashfield
Party	Candidate	Votes	%	±%
Labor	Paul Whelan	16,111	53.5	+11.4
Liberal	Alwyn Innes	13,189	43.8	−3.6
Independent	Warren Wilson	443	1.5	+1.5
Australia	Clifford Bros	373	1.2	−4.4
Total formal votes		30,116	98.0	+1.5
Informal votes		606	2.0	−1.5
Turnout		30,722	91.6	+0.9
Two-party-preferred result
Labor	Paul Whelan	16,594	55.1	+8.7
Liberal	Alwyn Innes	13,522	44.9	−8.7
Labor gain from Liberal		Swing	+8.7	

=== Auburn ===
1976 New South Wales state election: Auburn
Party	Candidate	Votes	%	±%
Labor	Peter Cox	20,955	65.3	+2.5
Liberal	Stephen Sim	11,132	34.7	+3.9
Total formal votes		32,087	97.4	+0.4
Informal votes		856	2.6	−0.4
Turnout		32,943	94.6	+0.9
Labor hold		Swing	+1.2	

=== Balmain ===
1976 New South Wales state election: Balmain
Party	Candidate	Votes	%	±%
Labor	Roger Degen	19,204	67.3	−1.9
Liberal	Jeffrey Thompson	7,054	24.7	+24.7
Socialist Workers	Juanita Keig	1,002	3.5	+3.5
Communist	Peter Cockroft	680	2.4	+2.4
Independent	Donald Henderson	615	2.1	+2.1
Total formal votes		28,555	97.0	+2.4
Informal votes		875	3.0	−2.4
Turnout		29,430	89.2	−0.3
Two-party-preferred result
Labor	Roger Degen	21,188	74.2	−2.3
Liberal	Jeffrey Thompson	7,367	25.8	+25.8
Labor hold		Swing	−2.3	

=== Bankstown ===
1976 New South Wales state election: Bankstown
Party	Candidate	Votes	%	±%
Labor	Nick Kearns	20,619	65.5	+3.5
Liberal	John Ghent	10,872	34.5	+0.7
Total formal votes		31,491	98.0	+1.0
Informal votes		657	2.0	−1.0
Turnout		32,148	94.2	+0.4
Labor hold		Swing	+2.7	

=== Barwon ===
1976 New South Wales state election: Barwon
Party	Candidate	Votes	%	±%
Country	Wal Murray	11,999	58.5	−17.0
Labor	Marshall Duncan	8,504	41.5	+41.5
Total formal votes		20,503	98.6	−2.4
Informal votes		294	1.4	+2.4
Turnout		20,797	93.6	+1.9
Country hold		Swing	−17.0	

=== Bass Hill ===
1976 New South Wales state election: Bass Hill
Party	Candidate	Votes	%	±%
Labor	Neville Wran	19,684	64.6	+3.9
Liberal	Terence Shanahan	10,788	35.4	−3.9
Total formal votes		30,472	97.8	+1.4
Informal votes		694	2.2	−1.4
Turnout		31,166	94.5	0.0
Labor hold		Swing	+3.9	

=== Bathurst ===
1976 New South Wales state election: Bathurst
Party	Candidate	Votes	%	±%
Country	Clive Osborne	11,416	50.5	−9.4
Labor	Mark Worthington	9,965	44.1	+7.6
Independent	Peter Foster	1,215	5.4	+5.4
Total formal votes		22,596	99.1	+0.3
Informal votes		209	0.9	−0.3
Turnout		22,805	95.3	−0.3
Two-party-preferred result
Country	Clive Osborne	11,981	53.0	−9.8
Labor	Mark Worthington	10,615	47.0	+9.8
Country hold		Swing	−9.8	

=== Blacktown ===
1976 New South Wales state election: Blacktown
Party	Candidate	Votes	%	±%
Labor	Gordon Barnier	19,590	62.9	+4.6
Liberal	John Lyon	10,436	33.5	+1.5
Independent	Raymond Ferguson	1,127	3.6	+3.6
Total formal votes		31,153	97.7	+2.4
Informal votes		725	2.3	−2.4
Turnout		31,878	95.1	+1.5
Two-party-preferred result
Labor	Gordon Barnier	20,163	64.7	+2.0
Liberal	John Lyon	10,990	35.3	−2.0
Labor hold		Swing	+2.0	

=== Bligh ===
1976 New South Wales state election: Bligh
Party	Candidate	Votes	%	±%
Liberal	John Barraclough	16,868	57.4	−8.9
Labor	Mairi Petersen	9,462	32.2	+32.2
Independent	Graeme Donkin	1,121	3.8	+3.8
Workers	John Curvers	1,085	3.7	+3.7
Independent	Alexander Nash	872	3.0	+3.0
Total formal votes		29,408	97.7	+2.6
Informal votes		706	2.3	−2.6
Turnout		30,114	87.6	+3.6
Two-party-preferred result
Liberal	John Barraclough	18,750	63.8	−6.2
Labor	Mairi Petersen	10,658	36.2	+36.2
Liberal hold		Swing	−6.2	

=== Blue Mountains ===
1976 New South Wales state election: Blue Mountains
Party	Candidate	Votes	%	±%
Labor	Mick Clough	11,957	50.5	+8.6
Independent	Harold Coates	11,721	49.5	−5.4
Total formal votes		23,678	98.3	−0.3
Informal votes		410	1.7	+0.3
Turnout		24,088	93.5	−0.5
Labor gain from Independent		Swing	+7.0	

=== Broken Hill ===
1976 New South Wales state election: Broken Hill
Party	Candidate	Votes	%	±%
Labor	Lew Johnstone	unopposed		
Labor hold				

=== Burrendong ===
1976 New South Wales state election: Burrendong
Party	Candidate	Votes	%	±%
Country	Roger Wotton	12,923	57.9	+13.6
Labor	Reynold Toyer	9,399	42.1	−0.7
Total formal votes		22,322	99.0	0.0
Informal votes		232	1.0	0.0
Turnout		22,554	94.4	0.0
Country hold		Swing	+4.1	

=== Burrinjuck ===
1976 New South Wales state election: Burrinjuck
Party	Candidate	Votes	%	±%
Labor	Terry Sheahan	12,028	58.8	+9.8
Country	Thomas Glover	8,416	41.2	+13.1
Total formal votes		20,444	99.1	+0.9
Informal votes		188	0.9	−0.9
Turnout		20,632	95.4	+0.3
Labor hold		Swing	+6.8	

=== Burwood ===
1976 New South Wales state election: Burwood
Party	Candidate	Votes	%	±%
Liberal	John Jackett	14,680	55.4	−1.8
Labor	Peter Woods	10,687	40.3	+4.0
Workers	John Coles	1,137	4.3	+4.3
Total formal votes		26,504	98.0	+1.0
Informal votes		550	2.0	−1.0
Turnout		27,054	92.3	+1.2
Two-party-preferred result
Liberal	John Jackett	15,476	58.4	−4.0
Labor	Peter Woods	11,028	41.6	+4.0
Liberal hold		Swing	−4.0	

=== Byron ===
1976 New South Wales state election: Byron
Party	Candidate	Votes	%	±%
Country	Jack Boyd	13,396	59.9	−1.9
Labor	Keith Enderbury	8,979	40.1	+7.3
Total formal votes		22,375	98.6	−0.1
Informal votes		318	1.4	+0.1
Turnout		22,693	91.2	−1.3
Country hold		Swing	−4.4	

=== Campbelltown ===
1976 New South Wales state election: Campbelltown
Party	Candidate	Votes	%	±%
Labor	Cliff Mallam	20,685	58.9	+7.2
Liberal	Robert Barton	14,429	41.1	−0.7
Total formal votes		35,114	97.5	+0.2
Informal votes		907	2.5	−0.2
Turnout		36,021	94.7	+0.8
Labor hold		Swing	+3.3	

=== Canterbury ===
1976 New South Wales state election: Canterbury
Party	Candidate	Votes	%	±%
Labor	Kevin Stewart	19,581	64.3	+5.5
Liberal	Marjorie Pennington	10,889	35.7	−0.4
Total formal votes		30,470	96.8	+0.4
Informal votes		990	3.2	−0.4
Turnout		31,460	92.6	+1.6
Labor hold		Swing	+4.4	

=== Casino ===
1976 New South Wales state election: Casino
Party	Candidate	Votes	%	±%
Labor	Don Day	10,829	49.9	+2.8
Country	Donald McRae	5,677	26.2	+3.8
Country	Leslie Isaac	5,186	23.9	+23.9
Total formal votes		21,692	99.1	0.0
Informal votes		193	0.9	0.0
Turnout		21,885	94.6	+0.7
Two-party-preferred result
Labor	Don Day	11,197	51.6	+0.6
Country	Donald McRae	10,495	48.4	−0.6
Labor hold		Swing	+0.6	

=== Castlereagh ===
1976 New South Wales state election: Castlereagh
Party	Candidate	Votes	%	±%
Labor	Jack Renshaw	10,151	51.2	+0.9
Country	Albert Green	7,346	37.0	+1.1
Liberal	John Browne	2,349	11.8	−2.0
Total formal votes		19,846	99.1	+0.6
Informal votes		172	0.9	−0.6
Turnout		20,018	93.7	+1.6
Two-party-preferred result
Labor	Jack Renshaw	10,386	52.3	+1.0
Country	Albert Green	9,460	47.7	−1.0
Labor hold		Swing	+1.0	

=== Cessnock ===
1976 New South Wales state election: Cessnock
Party	Candidate	Votes	%	±%
Labor	George Neilly	17,814	77.0	−1.1
Liberal	Suzan Ross-Gowan	5,327	23.0	+23.0
Total formal votes		23,141	98.7	+1.3
Informal votes		310	1.3	−1.3
Turnout		23,451	96.0	+0.1
Labor hold		Swing	−1.1	

=== Charlestown ===
1976 New South Wales state election: Charlestown
Party	Candidate	Votes	%	±%
Labor	Richard Face	20,019	61.7	+7.8
Liberal	Thomas Ford	12,455	38.3	+1.6
Total formal votes		32,474	98.6	+0.6
Informal votes		472	1.4	−0.6
Turnout		32,946	95.3	−0.7
Labor hold		Swing	+3.2	

=== Clarence ===
1976 New South Wales state election: Clarence
Party	Candidate	Votes	%	±%
Country	Matt Singleton	16,905	63.7	−0.2
Labor	Colin Clague	9,613	36.3	+7.4
Total formal votes		26,518	98.7	+0.1
Informal votes		346	1.3	−0.1
Turnout		26,864	94.0	−0.4
Country hold		Swing	−4.4	

=== Coogee ===
1976 New South Wales state election: Coogee
Party	Candidate	Votes	%	±%
Labor	Michael Cleary	16,265	53.7	+8.2
Liberal	Phillip Billings	14,036	46.3	+1.2
Total formal votes		30,301	97.9	+0.8
Informal votes		662	2.1	−0.8
Turnout		30,963	89.7	+1.3
Labor gain from Liberal		Swing	+3.7	

=== Corrimal ===
1976 New South Wales state election: Corrimal
Party	Candidate	Votes	%	±%
Labor	Laurie Kelly	18,701	63.1	+5.0
Liberal	Peter Atkins	10,929	36.9	+8.5
Total formal votes		29,630	97.6	+0.4
Informal votes		715	2.4	−0.4
Turnout		30,345	94.5	+1.7
Labor hold		Swing	−1.7	

=== Cronulla ===
1976 New South Wales state election: Cronulla
Party	Candidate	Votes	%	±%
Liberal	Ian Griffith	15,960	51.2	+0.4
Labor	Michael Egan	14,045	45.1	+4.9
Workers	Ian Scott	1,147	3.7	+3.7
Total formal votes		31,152	98.9	+0.3
Informal votes		337	1.1	−0.3
Turnout		31,489	94.0	−0.1
Two-party-preferred result
Liberal	Ian Griffith	16,763	53.8	−0.9
Labor	Michael Egan	14,389	46.2	+0.9
Liberal hold		Swing	−0.9	

=== Davidson ===
1976 New South Wales state election: Davidson
Party	Candidate	Votes	%	±%
Liberal	Dick Healey	18,209	66.4	+5.1
Labor	Raymond Graham	9,226	33.6	+10.0
Total formal votes		27,435	98.4	+0.2
Informal votes		451	1.6	−0.2
Turnout		27,886	94.6	+0.2
Liberal hold		Swing	−2.6	

=== Drummoyne ===
1976 New South Wales state election: Drummoyne
Party	Candidate	Votes	%	±%
Labor	Michael Maher	16,483	56.3	+6.5
Liberal	James Reid	11,843	40.5	−4.6
Workers	Hugh Frazer	949	3.2	+3.2
Total formal votes		29,275	98.2	+1.2
Informal votes		520	1.8	−1.2
Turnout		29,795	93.6	−0.3
Two-party-preferred result
Labor	Michael Maher	16,768	57.3	+6.6
Liberal	James Reid	12,507	42.7	−6.6
Labor hold		Swing	+6.6	

=== Dubbo ===
1976 New South Wales state election: Dubbo
Party	Candidate	Votes	%	±%
Liberal	John Mason	9,942	40.4	−20.4
Labor	Damian Hession	7,728	31.4	−2.6
Independent	Gerry Peacocke	6,939	28.2	+28.2
Total formal votes		24,609	99.3	+0.5
Informal votes		166	0.7	−0.5
Turnout		24,775	94.6	+0.3
Two-party-preferred result
Liberal	John Mason	15,612	63.4	−1.6
Labor	Damian Hession	8,997	36.6	+1.6
Liberal hold		Swing	−1.6	

=== Earlwood ===
1976 New South Wales state election: Earlwood
Party	Candidate	Votes	%	±%
Liberal	Eric Willis	17,111	54.5	+2.9
Labor	Ken Gabb	14,259	45.5	+6.8
Total formal votes		31,370	98.5	+1.3
Informal votes		471	1.5	−1.3
Turnout		31,841	95.3	+0.2
Liberal hold		Swing	−2.2	

=== East Hills ===
1976 New South Wales state election: East Hills
Party	Candidate	Votes	%	±%
Labor	Pat Rogan	20,095	64.8	+10.4
Liberal	George Edgell	10,905	35.2	+2.4
Total formal votes		31,000	98.3	+0.5
Informal votes		521	1.7	−0.5
Turnout		31,521	95.0	−0.4
Labor hold		Swing	+3.7	

=== Eastwood ===
1976 New South Wales state election: Eastwood
Party	Candidate	Votes	%	±%
Liberal	Jim Clough	19,875	64.7	+2.2
Labor	Robert Cummins	10,865	35.3	+35.3
Total formal votes		30,740	98.8	+1.5
Informal votes		380	1.2	−1.5
Turnout		31,120	94.2	+1.4
Liberal hold		Swing	−1.7	

=== Fairfield ===
1976 New South Wales state election: Fairfield
Party	Candidate	Votes	%	±%
Labor	Eric Bedford	20,777	69.2	+5.2
Liberal	Charles Rogers	9,271	30.8	+2.5
Total formal votes		30,048	96.6	+1.6
Informal votes		1,052	3.4	−1.6
Turnout		31,100	93.6	+1.4
Labor hold		Swing	+1.3	

=== Fuller ===
1976 New South Wales state election: Fuller
Party	Candidate	Votes	%	±%
Liberal	Peter Coleman	15,682	52.2	+2.4
Labor	Rodney Cavalier	13,312	44.3	+8.6
Australia	Christopher Dunkerley	1,031	3.4	−3.4
Total formal votes		30,025	98.7	+1.1
Informal votes		382	1.3	−1.1
Turnout		30,407	93.7	+0.5
Two-party-preferred result
Liberal	Peter Coleman	16,023	53.4	−1.9
Labor	Rodney Cavalier	14,002	46.6	+1.9
Liberal hold		Swing	−1.9	

=== Georges River ===
1976 New South Wales state election: Georges River
Party	Candidate	Votes	%	±%
Labor	Frank Walker	16,929	52.8	+7.4
Liberal	Maxwell Gibson	15,111	47.2	+2.8
Total formal votes		32,040	98.6	+0.7
Informal votes		448	1.4	−0.7
Turnout		32,488	95.5	+0.2
Labor hold		Swing	+2.1	

=== Gloucester ===
1976 New South Wales state election: Gloucester
Party	Candidate	Votes	%	±%
Country	Leon Punch	14,160	61.6	−3.6
Labor	Johannes Winkelman	6,723	29.3	+7.0
Independent	Herbert Collins	2,085	9.1	−3.4
Total formal votes		22,968	99.1	+0.5
Informal votes		219	0.9	−0.5
Turnout		23,187	93.8	+1.1
Two-party-preferred result
Country	Leon Punch	15,886	69.2	−6.0
Labor	Johannes Winkelman	7,082	30.8	+6.0
Country hold		Swing	−6.0	

=== Gordon ===
1976 New South Wales state election: Gordon
Party	Candidate	Votes	%	±%
Liberal	Tim Moore	18,168	64.9	+64.9
Labor	Margaret Atkin	4,695	16.8	−3.8
Democratic Labor	Kevin Harrold	2,201	7.9	−71.5
Independent	John Harris	1,789	6.4	+6.4
Workers	Christopher Brown	1,147	4.1	+4.1
Total formal votes		28,000	98.8	+2.5
Informal votes		349	1.2	−2.5
Turnout		28,349	93.2	+0.9
Two-party-preferred result
Liberal	Tim Moore	22,815	81.5	+81.5
Labor	Margaret Atkin	5,185	18.5	−2.1
Liberal gain from Democratic Labor		Swing	N/A	

=== Gosford ===
1976 New South Wales state election: Gosford
Party	Candidate	Votes	%	±%
Liberal	Malcolm Brooks	14,534	48.9	−3.8
Labor	Brian McGowan	14,347	48.3	+4.7
Australia	Barry Phillips	855	2.9	+2.9
Total formal votes		29,736	98.9	+0.6
Informal votes		329	1.1	−0.6
Turnout		30,065	94.7	+1.2
Two-party-preferred result
Labor	Brian McGowan	14,905	50.1	+5.8
Liberal	Malcolm Brooks	14,831	49.9	−5.8
Labor gain from Liberal		Swing	+5.8	

=== Goulburn ===
1976 New South Wales state election: Goulburn
Party	Candidate	Votes	%	±%
Country	Ron Brewer	12,091	54.6	−9.4
Labor	Brian Lulham	10,044	45.4	+14.6
Total formal votes		22,135	99.1	+0.8
Informal votes		202	0.9	−0.8
Turnout		22,337	95.2	+0.2
Country hold		Swing	−13.3	

=== Granville ===
1976 New South Wales state election: Granville
Party	Candidate	Votes	%	±%
Labor	Pat Flaherty	19,807	68.8	+2.3
Liberal	Frank Babic	8,974	31.2	+2.3
Total formal votes		28,781	97.7	+1.3
Informal votes		691	2.3	−1.3
Turnout		29,472	94.2	+1.6
Labor hold		Swing	+1.3	

=== Hawkesbury ===
1976 New South Wales state election: Hawkesbury
Party	Candidate	Votes	%	±%
Liberal	Kevin Rozzoli	19,367	60.8	−0.1
Labor	Alwyn Lindfield	12,486	39.2	+8.9
Total formal votes		31,853	98.1	+1.4
Informal votes		609	1.9	−1.4
Turnout		32,462	91.4	−0.4
Liberal hold		Swing	−5.7	

=== Heathcote ===
1976 New South Wales state election: Heathcote
Party	Candidate	Votes	%	±%
Labor	Rex Jackson	19,228	63.2	+4.7
Liberal	Ron Phillips	11,201	36.8	+8.2
Total formal votes		30,429	98.4	+0.5
Informal votes		501	1.6	−0.5
Turnout		30,930	94.8	+0.8
Labor hold		Swing	−2.3	

=== Heffron ===
1976 New South Wales state election: Heffron
Party	Candidate	Votes	%	±%
Labor	Laurie Brereton	18,994	63.1	−4.9
Liberal	George Balos	8,794	29.2	+29.2
Independent	Crena Morrison	1,315	4.4	+4.4
Independent	John Holt	1,016	3.4	+3.4
Total formal votes		30,119	97.5	+2.7
Informal votes		769	2.5	−2.7
Turnout		30,888	90.1	+0.5
Two-party-preferred result
Labor	Laurie Brereton	21,031	69.8	−4.1
Liberal	George Balos	9,088	30.2	+30.2
Labor hold		Swing	−4.1	

=== Hornsby ===
1976 New South Wales state election: Hornsby
Party	Candidate	Votes	%	±%
Liberal	Neil Pickard	20,107	61.6	+1.6
Labor	Hans Eisler	12,555	38.4	+5.2
Total formal votes		32,662	98.1	+0.2
Informal votes		619	1.9	−0.2
Turnout		33,281	95.3	+2.1
Liberal hold		Swing	−3.8	

=== Hurstville ===
1976 New South Wales state election: Hurstville
Party	Candidate	Votes	%	±%
Liberal	Tom Mead	14,920	48.8	+0.1
Labor	Kevin Ryan	14,855	48.6	+6.1
Australia	Bernhard Fiegel	791	2.6	+2.6
Total formal votes		30,566	98.8	+0.7
Informal votes		382	1.2	−0.7
Turnout		30,948	93.6	−0.4
Two-party-preferred result
Labor	Kevin Ryan	15,305	50.1	+3.2
Liberal	Tom Mead	15,261	49.9	−3.2
Labor gain from Liberal		Swing	+3.2	

=== Illawarra ===
1976 New South Wales state election: Illawarra
Party	Candidate	Votes	%	±%
Labor	George Petersen	21,081	65.8	−6.9
Independent	Henry Schipp	9,145	28.5	+28.5
Workers	Margaret Wright	1,826	5.7	+5.7
Total formal votes		32,052	98.1	+2.8
Informal votes		608	1.9	−2.8
Turnout		32,660	94.0	+1.0
Two-candidate-preferred result
Labor	George Petersen	21,994	68.6	−4.1
Independent	Henry Schipp	10,058	31.4	+31.4
Labor hold		Swing	−4.1	

=== Kirribilli ===
1976 New South Wales state election: Kirribilli
Party	Candidate	Votes	%	±%
Liberal	Bruce McDonald	10,593	42.7	−16.5
Labor	Patrick Healy	9,050	36.4	+2.0
Independent	John Waddy	4,343	17.5	+17.5
Workers	David Rennie	732	3.0	+3.0
Independent	Romaulds Kemps	121	0.5	+0.5
Total formal votes		24,839	98.6	+1.1
Informal votes		359	1.4	−1.1
Turnout		25,198	89.0	+4.1
Two-party-preferred result
Liberal	Bruce McDonald	15,176	61.1	−3.2
Labor	Patrick Healy	9,663	38.9	+3.2
Liberal hold		Swing	−3.2	

John Waddy was the sitting member for Kirribilli but was denied Liberal pre-selection and stood for the seat as an independent.

=== Kogarah ===
1976 New South Wales state election: Kogarah
Party	Candidate	Votes	%	±%
Labor	Bill Crabtree	17,753	55.4	+1.1
Liberal	Terrence Fraser	13,537	42.2	+0.5
Workers	Robert Schollbach	761	2.4	+2.4
Total formal votes		32,051	98.6	+0.7
Informal votes		457	1.4	−0.7
Turnout		32,508	94.3	+0.8
Two-party-preferred result
Labor	Bill Crabtree	17,981	56.1	+1.0
Liberal	Terrence Fraser	14,070	43.9	−1.0
Labor hold		Swing	+1.0	

=== Ku-ring-gai ===
1976 New South Wales state election: Ku-ring-gai
Party	Candidate	Votes	%	±%
Liberal	John Maddison	21,605	73.0	−4.6
Labor	Ian Cameron	6,020	20.4	+2.5
Workers	David Griffiths	1,960	6.6	+6.6
Total formal votes		29,585	98.9	+0.8
Informal votes		316	1.1	−0.8
Turnout		29,901	92.5	−0.1
Two-party-preferred result
Liberal	John Maddison	22,977	77.7	−3.5
Labor	Ian Cameron	6,608	22.3	+3.5
Liberal hold		Swing	−3.5	

=== Lake Macquarie ===
1976 New South Wales state election: Lake Macquarie
Party	Candidate	Votes	%	±%
Labor	Merv Hunter	19,022	64.4	−1.6
Liberal	Oliver Fennell	10,521	35.6	+35.6
Total formal votes		29,543	98.5	+1.1
Informal votes		449	1.5	−1.1
Turnout		29,992	94.4	+0.6
Labor hold		Swing	−8.9	

=== Lakemba ===
1976 New South Wales state election: Lakemba
Party	Candidate	Votes	%	±%
Labor	Vince Durick	19,518	59.8	+2.9
Liberal	Robin Graham	11,008	33.7	−3.2
Independent	Donald Carruthers	1,137	3.5	+3.5
Australia	Timothy Dein	976	3.0	+3.0
Total formal votes		32,639	98.0	+1.5
Informal votes		670	2.0	−1.5
Turnout		33,309	95.1	+2.8
Two-party-preferred result
Labor	Vince Durick	21,118	64.7	+5.0
Liberal	Robin Graham	11,521	35.3	−5.0
Labor hold		Swing	+5.0	

=== Lane Cove ===
1976 New South Wales state election: Lane Cove
Party	Candidate	Votes	%	±%
Liberal	John Dowd	18,846	65.2	+4.2
Labor	Alan Lees	8,922	30.9	+11.3
Australia	Elizabeth Poppleton	1,147	4.0	−8.9
Total formal votes		28,915	98.7	+1.2
Informal votes		371	1.3	−1.2
Turnout		29,286	92.5	+2.2
Two-party-preferred result
Liberal	John Dowd	19,188	66.4	−2.9
Labor	Alan Lees	9,720	33.6	+2.9
Liberal hold		Swing	−2.9	

=== Lismore ===
1976 New South Wales state election: Lismore
Party	Candidate	Votes	%	±%
Country	Bruce Duncan	unopposed		
Country hold				

=== Liverpool ===
1976 New South Wales state election: Liverpool
Party	Candidate	Votes	%	±%
Labor	George Paciullo	22,298	69.6	+2.7
Liberal	Rex Harris	9,762	30.4	+2.8
Total formal votes		32,060	97.1	+1.0
Informal votes		959	2.9	−1.0
Turnout		33,019	94.0	+1.5
Labor hold		Swing	+1.6	

=== Maitland ===
1976 New South Wales state election: Maitland
Party	Candidate	Votes	%	±%
Liberal	Milton Morris	15,565	59.8	−4.6
Labor	Kerry Ryan	10,450	40.2	+11.1
Total formal votes		26,015	98.7	+0.4
Informal votes		348	1.3	−0.4
Turnout		26,363	95.4	−0.8
Liberal hold		Swing	−9.8	

=== Manly ===
1976 New South Wales state election: Manly
Party	Candidate	Votes	%	±%
Liberal	Douglas Darby	16,760	57.7	+2.6
Labor	Marc Gumbert	12,301	42.3	+12.3
Total formal votes		29,061	97.8	+0.2
Informal votes		656	2.2	−0.2
Turnout		29,717	91.8	+1.2
Liberal hold		Swing	−5.7	

=== Maroubra ===
1976 New South Wales state election: Maroubra
Party	Candidate	Votes	%	±%
Labor	Bill Haigh	18,703	62.1	+6.6
Liberal	Lindsay Rutherford	10,603	35.2	+0.5
Australia	Marie Morris	836	2.8	−3.4
Total formal votes		30,142	98.1	+1.1
Informal votes		571	1.9	−1.1
Turnout		30,713	92.1	+0.7
Two-party-preferred result
Labor	Bill Haigh	19,288	64.0	+4.1
Liberal	Lindsay Rutherford	10,854	36.0	−4.1
Labor hold		Swing	+4.1	

=== Marrickville ===
1976 New South Wales state election: Marrickville
Party	Candidate	Votes	%	±%
Labor	Tom Cahill	21,629	72.0	+5.2
Liberal	Costa Lianos	7,497	25.0	−3.4
Socialist Workers	Geoffrey Payne	899	3.0	+3.0
Total formal votes		30,025	96.6	+1.5
Informal votes		1,045	3.4	−1.5
Turnout		31,070	88.7	−1.3
Two-party-preferred result
Labor	Tom Cahill	22,311	74.3	+6.6
Liberal	Costa Lianos	7,714	25.7	−6.6
Labor hold		Swing	+6.6	

=== Merrylands ===
1976 New South Wales state election: Merrylands
Party	Candidate	Votes	%	±%
Labor	Jack Ferguson	21,435	65.1	+7.0
Liberal	Rodney Lewis	11,487	34.9	−1.5
Total formal votes		32,922	97.5	+1.2
Informal votes		854	2.5	−1.2
Turnout		33,776	94.4	+2.1
Labor hold		Swing	+3.2	

=== Miranda ===
1976 New South Wales state election: Miranda
Party	Candidate	Votes	%	±%
Liberal	Tim Walker	16,323	54.0	+2.8
Labor	Bill Robb	13,910	46.0	+8.4
Total formal votes		30,233	98.6	+0.2
Informal votes		437	1.4	−0.2
Turnout		30,670	91.0	−3.8
Liberal hold		Swing	−2.4	

=== Monaro ===
1976 New South Wales state election: Monaro
Party	Candidate	Votes	%	±%
Labor	John Akister	11,196	48.6	+6.6
Liberal	Valerie Marland	6,330	27.5	−26.7
Country	Thomas Barry	5,519	23.9	+23.9
Total formal votes		23,045	98.4	+0.9
Informal votes		372	1.6	−0.9
Turnout		23,417	91.4	+0.1
Two-party-preferred result
Labor	John Akister	11,876	51.5	+8.8
Liberal	Valerie Marland	11,169	48.5	−8.8
Labor gain from Liberal		Swing	+8.8	

=== Mosman ===
1976 New South Wales state election: Mosman
Party	Candidate	Votes	%	±%
Liberal	David Arblaster	19,095	68.6	+2.6
Labor	John Cahill	7,352	26.4	+26.4
Australia	John Alexander	1,398	5.0	−20.9
Total formal votes		27,845	98.9	+1.5
Informal votes		302	1.1	−1.5
Turnout		28,147	92.2	+1.3
Two-party-preferred result
Liberal	David Arblaster	19,514	70.1	−3.7
Labor	John Cahill	8,331	29.9	+29.9
Liberal hold		Swing	−3.7	

=== Mount Druitt ===
1976 New South Wales state election: Mount Druitt
Party	Candidate	Votes	%	±%
Labor	Tony Johnson	19,089	67.4	+9.6
Liberal	James McCrudden	9,255	32.6	+3.5
Total formal votes		28,344	96.6	+0.7
Informal votes		1,008	3.4	−0.7
Turnout		29,352	94.2	+2.7
Labor hold		Swing	+4.0	

=== Munmorah ===
1976 New South Wales state election: Munmorah
Party	Candidate	Votes	%	±%
Labor	Harry Jensen	21,321	68.5	+5.0
Liberal	William Jackson	9,812	31.5	+0.7
Total formal votes		31,133	98.6	+0.2
Informal votes		432	1.4	−0.2
Turnout		31,565	95.0	+0.6
Labor hold		Swing	+3.9	

=== Murray ===
1976 New South Wales state election: Murray
Party	Candidate	Votes	%	±%
Liberal	Mary Meillon	7,234	38.8	+5.5
Labor	Ross Boyd	4,804	25.8	+2.2
Independent	Gregory Graham	4,479	24.1	+18.0
Independent	Ian Fleming	2,102	11.3	+11.3
Total formal votes		18,619	98.7	+2.3
Informal votes		236	1.3	−2.3
Turnout		18,855	89.2	−0.3
Two-candidate-preferred result
Liberal	Mary Meillon	11,663	62.6	+9.9
Independent	Gregory Graham	6,956	37.4	+37.4
Liberal hold		Swing	+9.9	

=== Murrumbidgee ===
1976 New South Wales state election: Murrumbidgee
Party	Candidate	Votes	%	±%
Labor	Lin Gordon	10,785	51.3	+1.6
Liberal	Donald Mackay	6,075	28.9	+1.7
Country	Bernardino Zappacosta	2,329	11.1	−9.6
Country	John Knight	1,841	8.8	+8.8
Total formal votes		21,030	98.5	+0.6
Informal votes		324	1.5	−0.6
Turnout		21,354	93.8	+2.0
Two-party-preferred result
Labor	Lin Gordon	11,286	53.7	+2.0
Liberal	Donald Mackay	9,744	46.3	−2.0
Labor hold		Swing	+2.0	

=== Nepean ===
1976 New South Wales state election: Nepean
Party	Candidate	Votes	%	±%
Liberal	Ron Rofe	17,038	51.1	+3.8
Labor	Peter Anderson	14,965	44.9	+6.2
Independent	John Henshaw	914	2.7	+2.7
Independent	Raymond Bell	418	1.3	+1.3
Total formal votes		33,335	98.7	+2.3
Informal votes		426	1.3	−2.3
Turnout		33,761	93.5	+0.9
Two-party-preferred result
Liberal	Ron Rofe	17,440	52.3	−1.0
Labor	Peter Anderson	15,895	47.7	+1.0
Liberal hold		Swing	−1.0	

=== Newcastle ===
1976 New South Wales state election: Newcastle
Party	Candidate	Votes	%	±%
Labor	Arthur Wade	17,857	67.7	+9.1
Liberal	Arthur Thomas	8,514	32.3	+1.6
Total formal votes		26,371	98.2	+0.6
Informal votes		475	1.8	−0.6
Turnout		26,846	93.9	−0.1
Labor hold		Swing	+4.8	

=== Northcott ===
1976 New South Wales state election: Northcott
Party	Candidate	Votes	%	±%
Liberal	Jim Cameron	21,408	68.2	+2.8
Labor	Sabine Willis	9,982	31.8	+31.8
Total formal votes		31,390	98.6	+1.4
Informal votes		428	1.4	−1.4
Turnout		31,818	92.9	−0.3
Liberal hold		Swing	−2.6	

=== Orange ===
1976 New South Wales state election: Orange
Party	Candidate	Votes	%	±%
Country	Garry West	14,171	59.8	−6.0
Labor	Maxwell Dunn	9,541	40.2	+11.4
Total formal votes		23,712	98.8	+0.3
Informal votes		280	1.2	−0.3
Turnout		23,992	94.3	−0.2
Country hold		Swing	−10.3	

=== Oxley ===
1976 New South Wales state election: Oxley
Party	Candidate	Votes	%	±%
Country	Bruce Cowan	16,672	69.2	−0.9
Labor	Peter Tullgren	7,415	30.8	+3.9
Total formal votes		24,087	98.8	+0.1
Informal votes		291	1.2	−0.1
Turnout		24,378	95.1	−0.4
Country hold		Swing	−3.3	

=== Parramatta ===
1976 New South Wales state election: Parramatta
Party	Candidate	Votes	%	±%
Labor	Barry Wilde	17,383	56.3	+0.7
Liberal	James Brown	12,553	40.6	+1.2
Workers	Barrie Sharpe	953	3.1	+3.1
Total formal votes		30,889	98.3	+0.4
Informal votes		537	1.7	−0.4
Turnout		31,426	92.0	+1.6
Two-party-preferred result
Labor	Barry Wilde	17,669	57.2	+0.6
Liberal	James Brown	13,220	42.8	−0.6
Labor hold		Swing	+0.6	

=== Peats ===
1976 New South Wales state election: Peats
Party	Candidate	Votes	%	±%
Labor	Keith O'Connell	19,289	58.7	+1.4
Liberal	Peter Walsh	13,579	41.3	−1.4
Total formal votes		32,868	98.3	+0.5
Informal votes		556	1.7	−0.5
Turnout		33,424	94.6	+1.2
Labor hold		Swing	+1.4	

=== Penrith ===
1976 New South Wales state election: Penrith
Party	Candidate	Votes	%	±%
Labor	Ron Mulock	19,804	59.6	+3.0
Liberal	Eileen Cammack	11,458	34.5	−3.9
Independent	Roy Allsopp	1,970	5.9	+5.9
Total formal votes		33,232	98.3	+1.2
Informal votes		590	1.7	−1.2
Turnout		33,822	94.6	+3.1
Two-party-preferred result
Labor	Ron Mulock	21,223	63.9	+4.0
Liberal	Eileen Cammack	12,009	36.1	−4.0
Labor hold		Swing	+4.0	

=== Phillip ===
1976 New South Wales state election: Phillip
Party	Candidate	Votes	%	±%
Labor	Pat Hills	18,732	69.5	+4.0
Liberal	Peter Starr	6,086	22.6	+4.4
Communist	Judy Mundey	1,540	5.7	+2.4
Socialist Workers	Deborah Shnookal	594	2.2	+2.2
Total formal votes		26,952	96.9	+2.6
Informal votes		864	3.1	−2.6
Turnout		27,816	84.4	+0.5
Two-party-preferred result
Labor	Pat Hills	20,472	76.0	+1.1
Liberal	Peter Starr	6,480	24.0	−1.1
Labor hold		Swing	+1.1	

=== Pittwater ===
1976 New South Wales state election: Pittwater
Party	Candidate	Votes	%	±%
Liberal	Bruce Webster	16,798	61.2	−2.8
Labor	Charles Wild	8,176	29.8	+0.3
Workers	John Booth	1,982	7.2	+7.2
Independent	Peter Middlebrook	473	1.7	+1.7
Total formal votes		27,429	98.7	+1.1
Informal votes		368	1.3	−1.1
Turnout		27,797	92.0	+1.4
Two-party-preferred result
Liberal	Bruce Webster	17,871	65.2	−4.0
Labor	Charles Wild	9,558	34.8	+4.0
Liberal hold		Swing	−4.0	

=== Raleigh ===
1976 New South Wales state election: Raleigh
Party	Candidate	Votes	%	±%
Country	Jim Brown	14,502	63.3	−5.1
Labor	Joseph Moran	8,402	36.7	+5.1
Total formal votes		22,905	98.8	+0.3
Informal votes		280	1.2	−0.3
Turnout		23,185	94.9	+0.4
Country hold		Swing	−5.1	

=== Rockdale ===
1976 New South Wales state election: Rockdale
Party	Candidate	Votes	%	±%
Labor	Brian Bannon	19,017	66.5	+3.8
Liberal	Raymond Scaysbrook	9,597	33.5	−0.2
Total formal votes		28,614	97.2	+0.9
Informal votes		814	2.8	−0.9
Turnout		29,428	93.4	−0.1
Labor hold		Swing	+3.1	

=== South Coast ===
1976 New South Wales state election: South Coast
Party	Candidate	Votes	%	±%
Independent	John Hatton	18,362	65.5	+20.8
Liberal	Irwin Heaton	9,274	33.1	−2.4
Workers	Noel Dennett	385	1.4	+1.4
Total formal votes		28,021	99.0	+2.2
Informal votes		284	1.0	−2.2
Turnout		28,305	93.5	+0.4
Two-candidate-preferred result
Independent	John Hatton	18,555	66.2	+14.5
Liberal	Irwin Heaton	9,466	33.8	−14.5
Independent hold		Swing	+14.5	

=== Sturt ===
1976 New South Wales state election: Sturt
Party	Candidate	Votes	%	±%
Country	Tim Fischer	13,803	68.8	+1.2
Labor	Cuthbert Richardson	6,266	31.2	+3.9
Total formal votes		20,069	99.1	+0.3
Informal votes		182	0.9	−0.3
Turnout		20,251	94.4	+0.7
Country hold		Swing	−3.4	

=== Tamworth ===
1976 New South Wales state election: Tamworth
Party	Candidate	Votes	%	±%
Country	Noel Park	15,508	62.8	+26.9
Labor	Noel Cassel	9,190	37.2	+19.5
Total formal votes		24,698	98.6	+2.7
Informal votes		347	1.4	−2.7
Turnout		25,045	94.5	+0.5
Country hold		Swing	−0.8	

=== Temora ===
1976 New South Wales state election: Temora
Party	Candidate	Votes	%	±%
Country	Jim Taylor	12,860	67.7	+3.5
Labor	Alroy Provan	5,629	29.7	+3.7
Independent	Wesley Berryman	497	2.6	+2.6
Total formal votes		18,986	99.3	+0.3
Informal votes		126	0.7	−0.3
Turnout		19,112	94.6	+6.1
Two-party-preferred result
Country	Jim Taylor	13,138	69.2	−1.3
Labor	Alroy Provan	5,848	30.8	+1.3
Country hold		Swing	−1.3	

=== Tenterfield ===
1976 New South Wales state election: Tenterfield
Party	Candidate	Votes	%	±%
Country	Tim Bruxner	12,979	66.0	−2.6
Labor	Joseph Hughes	6,681	34.0	+2.6
Total formal votes		19,660	98.8	0.0
Informal votes		231	1.2	0.0
Turnout		19,891	93.6	+1.9
Country hold		Swing	−2.6	

=== The Hills ===
1976 New South Wales state election: The Hills
Party	Candidate	Votes	%	±%
Liberal	Max Ruddock	19,144	65.1	−1.3
Labor	Paul Gibson	10,239	34.9	+6.1
Total formal votes		29,383	98.7	+0.3
Informal votes		399	1.3	−0.3
Turnout		29,782	95.6	+0.6
Liberal hold		Swing	−5.0	

=== Upper Hunter ===
1976 New South Wales state election: Upper Hunter
Party	Candidate	Votes	%	±%
Country	Col Fisher	15,432	62.7	+1.5
Labor	Michael Reddy	9,164	37.3	+1.8
Total formal votes		24,596	98.6	−0.2
Informal votes		357	1.4	+0.2
Turnout		24,953	95.1	−0.1
Country hold		Swing	−1.1	

=== Vaucluse ===
1976 New South Wales state election: Vaucluse
Party	Candidate	Votes	%	±%
Liberal	Keith Doyle	17,492	63.6	+0.5
Labor	Barbara Fuller-Quinn	9,994	36.4	+36.4
Total formal votes		27,486	97.1	+2.6
Informal votes		816	2.9	−2.6
Turnout		28,302	89.0	+1.0
Liberal hold		Swing	−5.2	

=== Wagga Wagga ===
1976 New South Wales state election: Wagga Wagga
Party	Candidate	Votes	%	±%
Liberal	Joe Schipp	13,245	58.8	−4.8
Labor	Richard Gorman	9,265	41.2	+14.8
Total formal votes		22,510	98.8	+0.3
Informal votes		261	1.2	−0.3
Turnout		22,771	93.9	+1.7
Liberal hold		Swing	−10.9	

=== Wakehurst ===
1976 New South Wales state election: Wakehurst
Party	Candidate	Votes	%	±%
Liberal	Allan Viney	17,836	57.8	+4.4
Labor	Noel Berrell	12,999	42.2	+10.6
Total formal votes		30,835	97.7	+0.4
Informal votes		715	2.3	−0.4
Turnout		31,550	91.7	+1.3
Liberal hold		Swing	−3.6	

=== Wallsend ===
1976 New South Wales state election: Wallsend
Party	Candidate	Votes	%	±%
Labor	Ken Booth	23,891	69.3	−2.0
Liberal	Stephen Walker	10,562	30.7	+30.7
Total formal votes		34,453	98.4	+1.6
Informal votes		553	1.6	−1.6
Turnout		35,006	95.7	0.0
Labor hold		Swing	−7.2	

=== Waratah ===
1976 New South Wales state election: Waratah
Party	Candidate	Votes	%	±%
Labor	Sam Jones	20,201	67.4	−5.0
Liberal	Richard Bevan	9,786	32.6	+32.6
Total formal votes		29,987	98.3	+1.3
Informal votes		513	1.7	−1.3
Turnout		30,500	94.5	−0.4
Labor hold		Swing	−9.2	

=== Waverley ===
1976 New South Wales state election: Waverley
Party	Candidate	Votes	%	±%
Labor	Syd Einfeld	14,691	57.0	+5.9
Liberal	Geoffrey Mort	11,075	43.0	+4.8
Total formal votes		25,766	97.4	−1.2
Informal votes		696	2.6	+1.2
Turnout		26,462	88.1	+1.6
Labor hold		Swing	+0.6	

=== Wentworthville ===
1976 New South Wales state election: Wentworthville
Party	Candidate	Votes	%	±%
Labor	Ernie Quinn	19,266	58.4	+2.9
Liberal	Edward Roberts	12,711	38.6	+1.6
Independent	Heather Gow	990	3.0	+3.0
Total formal votes		32,967	98.3	+1.5
Informal votes		572	1.7	−1.5
Turnout		33,539	95.1	+2.2
Two-party-preferred result
Labor	Ernie Quinn	20,002	60.7	+0.6
Liberal	Edward Roberts	12,965	39.3	−0.6
Labor hold		Swing	+0.6	

=== Willoughby ===
1976 New South Wales state election: Willoughby
Party	Candidate	Votes	%	±%
Liberal	Laurie McGinty	17,417	63.1	+2.0
Labor	Eddie Britt	10,183	36.9	+12.7
Total formal votes		27,600	97.7	+0.3
Informal votes		642	2.3	−0.3
Turnout		28,242	92.5	+2.0
Liberal hold		Swing	−6.2	

=== Wollondilly ===
1976 New South Wales state election: Wollondilly
Party	Candidate	Votes	%	±%
Liberal	Tom Lewis	14,514	52.2	−3.1
Labor	Bill Knott	10,883	39.1	+7.9
Workers	Victor Thomas	1,526	5.5	+5.5
Independent	William Tangye	880	3.2	+3.2
Total formal votes		27,803	98.7	+0.4
Informal votes		379	1.3	−0.4
Turnout		28,182	93.6	+1.3
Two-party-preferred result
Liberal	Tom Lewis	16,023	57.6	−4.4
Labor	Bill Knott	11,780	42.4	+4.4
Liberal hold		Swing	−4.4	

=== Wollongong ===
1976 New South Wales state election: Wollongong
Party	Candidate	Votes	%	±%
Labor	Eric Ramsay	18,367	66.0	+4.2
Liberal	Ian Brown	9,461	34.0	−0.9
Total formal votes		27,828	97.0	+0.8
Informal votes		867	3.0	−0.8
Turnout		28,695	93.0	+0.4
Labor hold		Swing	+3.6	

=== Woronora ===
1976 New South Wales state election: Woronora
Party	Candidate	Votes	%	±%
Labor	Maurie Keane	18,113	58.1	+12.5
Liberal	Ronald Ricketts	13,067	41.9	+5.2
Total formal votes		31,180	98.5	+1.2
Informal votes		488	1.5	−1.2
Turnout		31,668	94.7	+2.4
Labor hold		Swing	+5.9	

=== Yaralla ===
1976 New South Wales state election: Yaralla
Party	Candidate	Votes	%	±%
Liberal	Lerryn Mutton	15,761	54.4	+0.6
Labor	Derek Margerison	13,218	45.6	+7.0
Total formal votes		28,979	97.8	+0.1
Informal votes		662	2.2	−0.1
Turnout		29,641	91.4	+0.3
Liberal hold		Swing	−5.4	

=== Young ===
1976 New South Wales state election: Young
Party	Candidate	Votes	%	±%
Country	George Freudenstein	12,394	58.4	+1.0
Labor	Timothy West	8,818	41.6	+2.8
Total formal votes		21,212	98.6	−0.6
Informal votes		304	1.4	+0.6
Turnout		21,516	95.0	0.0
Country hold		Swing	−2.0	

== See also ==
- Candidates of the 1976 New South Wales state election
- Members of the New South Wales Legislative Assembly, 1976–1978
