= Candidates of the 1976 New South Wales state election =

This is a list of candidates for the 1976 New South Wales state election. The election was held on 1 May 1976.

== Retiring Members ==
Note: Steve Mauger MLA (Liberal, Monaro) resigned some months prior to the election; a by-election was scheduled for the seat, but was cancelled when the general election was called.

=== Labor ===
- Dan Mahoney MLA (Parramatta)

=== Liberal ===
- David Hunter MLA (Ashfield)

=== Country ===
- Geoff Crawford MLA (Barwon)

== Legislative Assembly ==
Sitting members are shown in bold text. Successful candidates are highlighted in the relevant colour. Where there is possible confusion, an asterisk (*) is also used.

Electorate	Held by	Labor candidate	Coalition candidate	Other candidates
Albury	Liberal	Kevin Elser	**Gordon Mackie** (Lib)	
Armidale	Country	Hubert Legge	**David Leitch** (CP)	
Ashfield	Liberal	Paul Whelan	Alwyn Innes (Lib)	Clifford Bros (AP); Warren Wilson (Ind)
Auburn	Labor	**Peter Cox**	Stephen Sim (Lib)	
Balmain	Labor	**Roger Degen**	Jeffrey Thompson (Lib)	Peter Cockcroft (CPA); Donald Henderson (Ind); Juanita Keig (SWP)
Bankstown	Labor	**Nick Kearns**	John Ghent (Lib)	
Barwon	Country	Marshall Duncan	Wal Murray (CP)	
Bass Hill	Labor	**Neville Wran**	Terence Shanahan (Lib)	
Bathurst	Country	Mark Worthington	**Clive Osborne** (CP)	Peter Foster (Ind)
Blacktown	Labor	**Gordon Barnier**	John Lyon (Lib)	Raymond Ferguson (Ind)
Bligh	Liberal	Mairi Petersen	**John Barraclough** (Lib)	John Curvers (WP); Graeme Donkin (Ind); Alexander Nash (Ind)
Blue Mountains	Independent	Mick Clough		**Harold Coates** (Ind)
Broken Hill	Labor	**Lew Johnstone**		
Burrendong	Country	Reynold Toyer	**Roger Wotton** (CP)	
Burrinjuck	Labor	**Terry Sheahan**	Thomas Glover (CP)	
Burwood	Liberal	Peter Woods	**John Jackett** (Lib)	John Coles (WP)
Byron	Country	Keith Enderbury	**Jack Boyd** (CP)	
Campbelltown	Labor	**Cliff Mallam**	Robert Barton (Lib)	
Canterbury	Labor	**Kevin Stewart**	Marjorie Pennington (Lib)	
Casino	Labor	**Don Day**	Leslie Isaac (CP); Donald McRae (CP)	
Castlereagh	Labor	**Jack Renshaw**	John Browne (Lib); Albert Green (CP)	
Cessnock	Labor	**George Neilly**	Suzan Ross-Gowan (Lib)	
Charlestown	Labor	**Richard Face**	Thomas Ford (Lib)	
Clarence	Country	Colin Clague	**Matt Singleton** (CP)	
Coogee	Labor	**Michael Cleary**	Phillip Billings (Lib)	
Corrimal	Labor	**Laurie Kelly**	Peter Atkins (Lib)	
Cronulla	Liberal	Michael Egan	**Ian Griffith** (Lib)	Ian Scott (WP)
Davidson	Liberal	Raymond Graham	**Dick Healey** (Lib)	
Drummoyne	Labor	**Michael Maher**	James Reid (Lib)	Hugh Frazer (WP)
Dubbo	Liberal	Damian Hession	**John Mason** (Lib)	Gerry Peacocke (Ind)
Earlwood	Liberal	Ken Gabb	**Eric Willis** (Lib)	
East Hills	Labor	**Pat Rogan**	George Edgell (Lib)	
Eastwood	Liberal	Robert Cummins	**Jim Clough** (Lib)	
Fairfield	Labor	**Eric Bedford**	Charles Rogers (Lib)	
Fuller	Liberal	Rodney Cavalier	**Peter Coleman** (Lib)	Christopher Dunkerley (AP)
Georges River	Labor	**Frank Walker**	Maxwell Gibson (Lib)	
Gloucester	Country	Johannes Winkelman	**Leon Punch** (CP)	Jack Collins (Ind)
Gordon	DLP	Margaret Atkin	Tim Moore (Lib)	Christopher Brown (WP); John Harris (Ind); **Kevin Harrold** (DLP)
Gosford	Liberal	Brian McGowan	**Malcolm Brooks** (Lib)	Barry Phillips (AP)
Goulburn	Country	Brian Lulham	**Ron Brewer** (CP)	
Granville	Labor	**Pat Flaherty**	Frank Babic (Lib)	
Hawkesbury	Liberal	Alwyn Lindfield	**Kevin Rozzoli** (Lib)	
Heathcote	Labor	**Rex Jackson**	Ron Phillips (Lib)	
Heffron	Labor	**Laurie Brereton**	George Balos (Lib)	John Holt (Ind); Crena Morrison (Ind)
Hornsby	Liberal	Hans Eisler	**Neil Pickard** (Lib)	
Hurstville	Liberal	Kevin Ryan	**Tom Mead** (Lib)	Bernhard Fiegel (AP)
Illawarra	Labor	**George Petersen**		Henry Schipp (Ind); Margaret Wright (WP)
Kirribilli	Liberal	Patrick Healy	Bruce McDonald (Lib)	Romualds Kemps (Ind); David Rennie (WP); **John Waddy** (Ind)
Kogarah	Labor	**Bill Crabtree**	Terrence Fraser (Lib)	Robert Schollbach (WP)
Ku-ring-gai	Liberal	Ian Cameron	**John Maddison** (Lib)	David Griffiths (WP)
Lake Macquarie	Labor	**Merv Hunter**	Oliver Fennell (Lib)	
Lakemba	Labor	**Vince Durick**	Robin Graham (Lib)	Donald Carruthers (Ind); Timothy Dein (AP)
Lane Cove	Liberal	Alan Lees	**John Dowd** (Lib)	Elizabeth Poppleton (AP)
Lismore	Country		**Bruce Duncan** (CP)	
Liverpool	Labor	**George Paciullo**	Rex Harris (Lib)	
Maitland	Liberal	Kerry Ryan	**Milton Morris** (Lib)	
Manly	Liberal	Marc Gumbert	**Douglas Darby** (Lib)	
Maroubra	Labor	**Bill Haigh**	Lindsay Rutherford (Lib)	Marie Morris (AP)
Marrickville	Labor	**Tom Cahill**	Costa Lianos (Lib)	Geoffrey Payne (SWP)
Merrylands	Labor	**Jack Ferguson**	Rodney Lewis (Lib)	
Miranda	Liberal	Bill Robb	**Tim Walker** (Lib)	
Monaro	Liberal	John Akister	Thomas Barry (CP); Valerie Marland (Lib)	
Mosman	Liberal	John Cahill	**David Arblaster** (Lib)	John Alexander (AP)
Mount Druitt	Labor	**Tony Johnson**	James McCrudden (Lib)	
Munmorah	Labor	**Harry Jensen**	William Jackson (Lib)	
Murray	Liberal	Ross Boyd	**Mary Meillon** (Lib)	Ian Fleming (Ind); Gregory Graham (Ind)
Murrumbidgee	Labor	**Lin Gordon**	John Knight (CP); Donald Mackay (Lib); Bernardino Zappacosta (CP)	
Nepean	Liberal	Peter Anderson	**Ron Rofe** (Lib)	Raymond Bell (Ind); John Henshaw (Ind)
Newcastle	Labor	**Arthur Wade**	Arthur Thomas (Lib)	
Northcott	Liberal	Sabine Willis	**Jim Cameron** (Lib)	
Orange	Country	Maxwell Dunn	**Garry West** (CP)	
Oxley	Country	Peter Tullgren	**Bruce Cowan** (CP)	
Parramatta	Labor	Barry Wilde	James Brown (Lib)	Barrie Sharpe (WP)
Peats	Labor	**Keith O'Connell**	Peter Walsh (Lib)	
Penrith	Labor	**Ron Mulock**	Eileen Cammack (Lib)	Roy Allsopp (Ind)
Phillip	Labor	**Pat Hills**	Peter Starr (Lib)	Judy Mundey (CPA); Deborah Shnookal (SWP)
Pittwater	Liberal	Charles Wild	**Bruce Webster** (Lib)	John Booth (WP); Peter Middlebrook (Ind)
Raleigh	Country	Joseph Moran	**Jim Brown** (CP)	
Rockdale	Labor	**Brian Bannon**	Raymond Scaysbrook (Lib)	
South Coast	Independent		Irwin Heaton (Lib)	Noel Dennett (WP); **John Hatton*** (Ind)
Sturt	Country	Cuthbert Richardson	**Tim Fischer** (CP)	
Tamworth	Country	Noel Cassel	**Noel Park** (CP)	
Temora	Country	Alroy Provan	**Jim Taylor** (CP)	Wesley Berryman (Ind)
Tenterfield	Country	Joseph Hughes	**Tim Bruxner** (CP)	
The Hills	Liberal	Paul Gibson	**Max Ruddock** (Lib)	
Upper Hunter	Country	Michael Reddy	**Col Fisher** (CP)	
Vaucluse	Liberal	Barbara Fuller-Quinn	**Keith Doyle** (Lib)	
Wagga Wagga	Liberal	Richard Gorman	**Joe Schipp** (Lib)	
Wakehurst	Liberal	Noel Berrell	**Allan Viney** (Lib)	
Wallsend	Labor	**Ken Booth**	Stephen Walker (Lib)	
Waratah	Labor	**Sam Jones**	Richard Bevan (Lib)	
Waverley	Labor	**Syd Einfeld**	Geoffrey Mort (Lib)	
Wentworthville	Labor	**Ernie Quinn**	John Griffiths (Lib)	Heather Gow (Ind)
Willoughby	Liberal	Eddie Britt	**Laurie McGinty** (Lib)	
Wollondilly	Liberal	Bill Knott	**Tom Lewis** (Lib)	William Tangye (Ind); Victor Thomas (WP)
Wollongong	Labor	**Eric Ramsay**	Ian Brown (Lib)	
Woronora	Labor	**Maurie Keane**	Ronald Ricketts (Lib)	
Yaralla	Liberal	Derek Margerison	**Lerryn Mutton** (Lib)	
Young	Country	Timothy West	**George Freudenstein** (CP)	

== See also ==
- Members of the New South Wales Legislative Assembly, 1976–1978
- Members of the New South Wales Legislative Council, 1976–1978
