= Electoral results for the district of Earlwood =

Election results for Earlwood, New South Wales, Australia

Earlwood, an electoral district of the Legislative Assembly in the Australian state of New South Wales was created in 1950 and abolished in 1991.

Election	Member	Party
1950	Eric Willis	Liberal
1953	Eric Willis	Liberal
1959	Eric Willis	Liberal
1962	Eric Willis	Liberal
1965	Eric Willis	Liberal
1968	Eric Willis	Liberal
1971	Eric Willis	Liberal
1973	Eric Willis	Liberal
1976	Eric Willis	Liberal
1978 by	Ken Gabb	Labor
1978	Ken Gabb	Labor
1981	Ken Gabb	Labor
1984	Ken Gabb	Labor
1988	Phil White	Liberal

== Election results ==
=== Elections in the 1980s ===
==== 1988 ====
1988 New South Wales state election: Earlwood
Party	Candidate	Votes	%	±%
Liberal	Phil White	15,528	51.3	+8.5
Labor	Ken Gabb	14,764	48.7	−5.7
Total formal votes		30,292	95.7	−1.5
Informal votes		1,353	4.3	+1.5
Turnout		31,645	95.6	
Liberal gain from Labor		Swing	+7.2	

==== 1984 ====
1984 New South Wales state election: Earlwood
Party	Candidate	Votes	%	±%
Labor	Ken Gabb	15,528	53.7	−7.0
Liberal	John Ryan	12,534	43.3	+6.7
Democrats	Paul Terrett	862	3.0	+0.3
Total formal votes		28,924	97.2	+0.7
Informal votes		833	2.8	−0.7
Turnout		29,757	94.6	+1.8
Two-party-preferred result
Labor	Ken Gabb		55.2	−7.0
Liberal	John Ryan		44.8	+7.0
Labor hold		Swing	−7.0	

==== 1981 ====
1981 New South Wales state election: Earlwood
Party	Candidate	Votes	%	±%
Labor	Ken Gabb	17,265	60.7	+0.6
Liberal	Shirley Watson	10,404	36.6	−1.2
Democrats	Paul Terrett	756	2.7	+2.7
Total formal votes		28,435	96.5	
Informal votes		1,022	3.5	
Turnout		29,457	92.8	
Two-party-preferred result
Labor	Ken Gabb	17,465	62.2	+0.6
Liberal	Shirley Watson	10,614	37.8	−0.6
Labor hold		Swing	+0.6	

=== Elections in the 1970s ===
==== 1978 ====
1978 New South Wales state election: Earlwood
Party	Candidate	Votes	%	±%
Labor	Ken Gabb	18,647	60.1	+14.6
Liberal	Alan Jones	11,725	37.8	−16.7
Independent	Charles Bingle	667	2.1	+2.1
Total formal votes		31,039	98.1	−0.4
Informal votes		596	1.9	+0.4
Turnout		31,635	94.4	−0.9
Two-party-preferred result
Labor	Ken Gabb	19,114	61.6	+16.1
Liberal	Alan Jones	11,925	38.4	−16.1
Labor gain from Liberal		Swing	+16.1	

Sir Eric Willis (Liberal) resigned on 16 June 1978 and Ken Gabb (Labor) won the resulting by-election, holding the seat at this election.

==== 1978 by-election ====
1978 Earlwood by-election
Party	Candidate	Votes	%	±%
Labor	Ken Gabb	15,168	52.62	+7.17
Liberal	Alan Jones	12,118	42.04	−12.51
Democrats	Kerry Warr	1,053	3.65	+3.65
Independent	Neville Fleming	269	0.93	+0.93
Gay Liberation	Peter Blazey	105	0.36	+0.36
Independent	Charles Bingle	52	0.18	+0.18
Conservative	Josephine Mallett	33	0.11	+0.11
Independent	Edwin Bellchambers	27	0.09	+0.09
Total formal votes		28,825	97.38	−1.14
Informal votes		775	2.62	+1.14
Turnout		29,600	88.24	−7.02
Labor gain from Liberal		Swing	+7.17	

==== 1976 ====
1976 New South Wales state election: Earlwood
Party	Candidate	Votes	%	±%
Liberal	Eric Willis	17,111	54.5	+2.9
Labor	Ken Gabb	14,259	45.5	+6.8
Total formal votes		31,370	98.5	+1.3
Informal votes		471	1.5	−1.3
Turnout		31,841	95.3	+0.2
Liberal hold		Swing	−2.2	

==== 1973 ====
1973 New South Wales state election: Earlwood
Party	Candidate	Votes	%	±%
Liberal	Eric Willis	15,498	51.6	−5.7
Labor	Colin Williams	11,628	38.7	−4.0
Australia	Alexander Paterson	1,566	5.2	+5.2
Democratic Labor	Doris Allison	1,331	4.4	+4.4
Total formal votes		30,023	97.2	
Informal votes		848	2.8	
Turnout		30,871	95.1	
Two-party-preferred result
Liberal	Eric Willis	17,033	56.7	−0.6
Labor	Colin Williams	12,990	43.3	+0.6
Liberal hold		Swing	−0.6	

==== 1971 ====
1971 New South Wales state election: Earlwood
Party	Candidate	Votes	%	±%
Liberal	Eric Willis	14,815	57.3	−5.4
Labor	Barry Robinson	11,044	42.7	+5.4
Total formal votes		25,859	97.9	
Informal votes		544	2.1	
Turnout		26,403	95.8	
Liberal hold		Swing	−5.4	

=== Elections in the 1960s ===
==== 1968 ====
1968 New South Wales state election: Earlwood
Party	Candidate	Votes	%	±%
Liberal	Eric Willis	16,289	62.7	+2.8
Labor	Cavell Becher	9,689	37.3	−2.8
Total formal votes		25,978	97.3	
Informal votes		710	2.7	
Turnout		26,688	95.6	
Liberal hold		Swing	+2.8	

==== 1965 ====
1965 New South Wales state election: Earlwood
Party	Candidate	Votes	%	±%
Liberal	Eric Willis	13,902	59.9	+2.6
Labor	Harry Chandler	9,289	40.1	−2.6
Total formal votes		23,191	98.6	−0.4
Informal votes		330	1.4	+0.4
Turnout		23,521	95.2	−0.4
Liberal hold		Swing	+2.6	

==== 1962 ====
1962 New South Wales state election: Earlwood
Party	Candidate	Votes	%	±%
Liberal	Eric Willis	13,286	57.3	−1.1
Labor	William Thompson	9,918	42.7	+1.1
Total formal votes		23,204	99.0	
Informal votes		230	1.0	
Turnout		23,434	95.6	
Liberal hold		Swing	−1.1	

=== Elections in the 1950s ===
==== 1959 ====
1959 New South Wales state election: Earlwood
Party	Candidate	Votes	%	±%
Liberal	Eric Willis	13,377	58.4	
Labor	John Buckeridge	9,518	41.6	
Total formal votes		22,895	98.8	
Informal votes		274	1.2	
Turnout		23,169	95.7	
Liberal hold		Swing		

==== 1956 ====
1956 New South Wales state election: Earlwood
Party	Candidate	Votes	%	±%
Liberal	Eric Willis	14,561	58.0	+7.7
Labor	David Connors	10,525	42.0	−7.7
Total formal votes		25,086	98.8	+0.5
Informal votes		310	1.2	−0.5
Turnout		25,396	95.4	−0.1
Liberal hold		Swing	+7.7	

==== 1953 ====
1953 New South Wales state election: Earlwood
Party	Candidate	Votes	%	±%
Liberal	Eric Willis	11,844	50.3	
Labor	Arthur Higgins	11,691	49.7	
Total formal votes		23,535	98.3	
Informal votes		401	1.7	
Turnout		23,936	95.5	
Liberal hold		Swing		

==== 1950 ====
1950 New South Wales state election: Earlwood
Party	Candidate	Votes	%	±%
Liberal	Eric Willis	11,774	55.5	
Labor	Arthur Higgins	9,428	44.5	
Total formal votes		21,202	98.7	
Informal votes		274	1.3	
Turnout		21,476	94.6	
Liberal notional hold				
