= Electoral results for the district of Wentworthville =

Election results for Wentworthville, New South Wales, Australia

Wentworthville, an electoral district of the Legislative Assembly in the Australian state of New South Wales, had two incarnations, from 1962 until 1991 and from 1999 until 2007.

Election	Member	Party
1962	Ernie Quinn	Labor
1965	Ernie Quinn	Labor
1968	Ernie Quinn	Labor
1971	Ernie Quinn	Labor
1973	Ernie Quinn	Labor
1976	Ernie Quinn	Labor
1978	Ernie Quinn	Labor
1981	Ernie Quinn	Labor
1984	Ernie Quinn	Labor
1988	Pam Allan	Labor
Election	Member	Party
1999	Pam Allan	Labor
2003	Pam Allan	Labor

== Election results ==
=== Elections in the 2000s ===
==== 2003 ====
2003 New South Wales state election: Wentworthville
Party	Candidate	Votes	%	±%
Labor	Pam Allan	21,744	54.8	+2.3
Liberal	Brett Murray	11,746	29.6	+2.3
Greens	Darren Reader	1,926	4.9	+2.2
Christian Democrats	Sam Baissari	1,728	4.4	−0.1
Against Further Immigration	Lyndon Shepherd	1,235	3.1	+1.8
Unity	Cynthia Su	813	2.0	−0.4
Democrats	Ian Swallow	506	1.3	−1.5
Total formal votes		39,698	96.8	+0.1
Informal votes		1,292	3.2	−0.1
Turnout		40,990	93.1	
Two-party-preferred result
Labor	Pam Allan	23,664	64.8	−0.6
Liberal	Brett Murray	12,866	35.2	+0.6
Labor hold		Swing	−0.6	

=== Elections in the 1990s ===
==== 1999 ====
1999 New South Wales state election: Wentworthville
Party	Candidate	Votes	%	±%
Labor	Pam Allan	21,250	52.5	+0.9
Liberal	Rachel Merton	11,071	27.3	−9.0
One Nation	John Hutchinson	2,609	6.4	+6.4
Christian Democrats	Dee Jonsson	1,819	4.5	+0.5
Democrats	Geoffrey Rutledge	1,132	2.8	+1.1
Greens	Rebecca Filipczyk	1,093	2.7	+2.7
Unity	See-Yung Chin	972	2.4	+2.4
Against Further Immigration	Ken O'Leary	534	1.3	−2.3
Total formal votes		40,480	96.8	+2.6
Informal votes		1,341	3.2	−2.6
Turnout		41,821	93.6	
Two-party-preferred result
Labor	Pam Allan	22,631	65.4	+7.7
Liberal	Rachel Merton	11,969	34.6	−7.7
Labor notional hold		Swing	+7.7	

=== Elections in the 1980s ===
==== 1988 ====
1988 New South Wales state election: Wentworthville
Party	Candidate	Votes	%	±%
Labor	Pam Allan	14,603	47.7	−10.0
Liberal	Gregory Hooper	10,287	33.6	−1.2
Independent	Allan Ezzy	4,476	14.6	+14.6
Independent	Manny Poularas	634	2.1	+2.1
Democrats	William Utterson	604	2.0	−3.0
Total formal votes		30,604	95.9	−0.7
Informal votes		1,314	4.1	+0.7
Turnout		31,918	95.4	
Two-party-preferred result
Labor	Pam Allan	15,681	53.9	−7.6
Liberal	Gregory Hooper	13,428	46.1	+7.6
Labor hold		Swing	−7.6	

==== 1984 ====
1984 New South Wales state election: Wentworthville
Party	Candidate	Votes	%	±%
Labor	Ernie Quinn	14,593	50.9	−11.7
Liberal	Colin Edwards	11,962	41.7	+4.3
Democrats	David Knight	2,107	7.4	+7.4
Total formal votes		28,662	97.0	+1.0
Informal votes		876	3.0	−1.0
Turnout		29,538	94.3	+0.8
Two-party-preferred result
Labor	Ernie Quinn		54.6	−8.0
Liberal	Colin Edwards		45.4	+8.0
Labor hold		Swing	−8.0	

==== 1981 ====
1981 New South Wales state election: Wentworthville
Party	Candidate	Votes	%	±%
Labor	Ernie Quinn	17,182	62.6	
Liberal	Colin Edwards	10,279	37.4	
Total formal votes		27,461	96.0	
Informal votes		1,157	4.0	
Turnout		28,618	93.5	
Labor hold		Swing	−4.5	

=== Elections in the 1970s ===
==== 1978 ====
1978 New South Wales state election: Wentworthville
Party	Candidate	Votes	%	±%
Labor	Ernie Quinn	24,088	70.9	+12.5
Liberal	Edward Roberts	7,911	23.3	−15.3
Democrats	Peggy Cable	1,997	5.9	+5.9
Total formal votes		33,996	97.5	−0.8
Informal votes		867	2.5	+0.8
Turnout		34,863	94.6	−0.5
Two-party-preferred result
Labor	Ernie Quinn	25,193	74.2	+13.5
Liberal	Edward Roberts	8,773	25.8	−13.5
Labor hold		Swing	+13.5	

==== 1976 ====
1976 New South Wales state election: Wentworthville
Party	Candidate	Votes	%	±%
Labor	Ernie Quinn	19,266	58.4	+2.9
Liberal	Edward Roberts	12,711	38.6	+1.6
Independent	Heather Gow	990	3.0	+3.0
Total formal votes		32,967	98.3	+1.5
Informal votes		572	1.7	−1.5
Turnout		33,539	95.1	+2.2
Two-party-preferred result
Labor	Ernie Quinn	20,002	60.7	+0.6
Liberal	Edward Roberts	12,965	39.3	−0.6
Labor hold		Swing	+0.6	

==== 1973 ====
1973 New South Wales state election: Wentworthville
Party	Candidate	Votes	%	±%
Labor	Ernie Quinn	16,686	55.5	−5.3
Liberal	Edward Roberts	11,133	37.0	−2.2
Independent	Ian Purdie	2,267	7.5	+7.5
Total formal votes		30,086	96.8	
Informal votes		984	3.2	
Turnout		31,070	92.9	
Two-party-preferred result
Labor	Ernie Quinn	18,080	60.1	−0.7
Liberal	Edward Roberts	12,006	39.9	+0.7
Labor hold		Swing	−0.7	

==== 1971 ====
1971 New South Wales state election: Wentworthville
Party	Candidate	Votes	%	±%
Labor	Ernie Quinn	15,697	60.8	+4.3
Liberal	Peter Andrews	10,122	39.2	+0.3
Total formal votes		25,819	97.8	
Informal votes		588	2.2	
Turnout		26,407	94.1	
Labor hold		Swing	+3.5	

=== Elections in the 1960s ===
==== 1968 ====
1968 New South Wales state election: Wentworthville
Party	Candidate	Votes	%	±%
Labor	Ernie Quinn	15,854	56.5	+5.6
Liberal	Richard Gregory	10,899	38.9	−5.2
Rates and Taxpayers	Albert Hall	1,288	4.6	+4.6
Total formal votes		28,041	97.1	
Informal votes		850	2.9	
Turnout		28,891	95.2	
Two-party-preferred result
Labor	Ernie Quinn	16,498	58.8	+3.7
Liberal	Richard Gregory	11,543	41.2	−3.7
Labor hold		Swing	+3.7	

==== 1965 ====
1965 New South Wales state election: Wentworthville
Party	Candidate	Votes	%	±%
Labor	Ernie Quinn	14,197	50.9	−0.3
Liberal	Ralph Stewart	12,300	44.1	+14.3
Democratic Labor	Arthur Byrnes	1,139	4.1	+4.1
Independent	Albert Hahn	260	0.9	+0.9
Total formal votes		27,896	97.4	−1.0
Informal votes		733	2.6	+1.0
Turnout		28,629	94.8	−0.2
Two-party-preferred result
Labor	Ernie Quinn	14,555	52.2	−8.5
Liberal	Ralph Stewart	13,341	47.8	+8.5
Labor hold		Swing	−8.5	

==== 1962 ====
1962 New South Wales state election: Wentworthville
Party	Candidate	Votes	%	±%
Labor	Ernie Quinn	12,362	51.2	−4.7
Liberal	Graham Cullis	7,204	29.8	−14.3
Independent	Montague Bennett	4,604	19.0	+19.0
Total formal votes		24,170	98.4	
Informal votes		390	1.6	
Turnout		24,560	95.0	
Two-party-preferred result
Labor	Ernie Quinn	14,664	60.7	+4.8
Liberal	Graham Cullis	9,506	39.3	−4.8
Labor notional hold		Swing		

- Wentworthville was a new seat that was notionally a safe Labor seat.
