= Electoral results for the district of Munmorah =

Election results for Munmorah, New South Wales, Australia

Munmorah, an electoral district of the Legislative Assembly in the Australian state of New South Wales was created in 1973 and abolished in 1981.

Election	Member	Party	Term
1973	Harry Jensen	Labor	
1976	Harry Jensen	Labor	
1978	Harry Jensen	Labor	

== Election results ==
=== 1978 ===
1978 New South Wales state election: Munmorah
Party	Candidate	Votes	%	±%
Labor	Harry Jensen	25,293	77.3	+8.8
Liberal	Brian Taylor	7,426	22.7	−8.8
Total formal votes		32,719	98.1	−0.5
Informal votes		626	1.9	+0.5
Turnout		33,345	93.5	−1.5
Labor hold		Swing	+8.8	

=== 1976 ===
1976 New South Wales state election: Munmorah
Party	Candidate	Votes	%	±%
Labor	Harry Jensen	21,321	68.5	+5.0
Liberal	William Jackson	9,812	31.5	+0.7
Total formal votes		31,133	98.6	+0.2
Informal votes		432	1.4	−0.2
Turnout		31,565	95.0	+0.6
Labor hold		Swing	+3.9	

=== 1973 ===
1973 New South Wales state election: Munmorah
Party	Candidate	Votes	%	±%
Labor	Harry Jensen	17,551	63.5	−3.0
Liberal	William Jackson	8,528	30.8	+1.7
Democratic Labor	Raymond Connolly	1,570	5.7	+1.3
Total formal votes		27,649	98.4	
Informal votes		446	1.6	
Turnout		28,095	94.4	
Two-party-preferred result
Labor	Harry Jensen	17,865	64.6	−2.6
Liberal	William Jackson	9,784	35.4	+2.6
Labor hold		Swing	−2.6	
