= Electoral results for the district of Woronora =

Election results for Woronora, New South Wales, Australia

Woronora, an electoral district of the Legislative Assembly in the Australian state of New South Wales, had two incarnations, from 1894 to 1904 and from 1973 to 1988.

Election	Member	Party
1894	John Nicholson (Note: 1898 was the only election at which John Nicholson was listed as anything other than Independent Labour and Antony Green suggests he may have been better classified as Independent Labour for 1898.)	Independent Labour
1895	John Nicholson	Independent Labour
1898	John Nicholson	Free Trade
1901	John Nicholson	Independent Labour
Election	Member	Party
1973	Maurie Keane	Labor
1976	Maurie Keane	Labor
1978	Maurie Keane	Labor
1981	Maurie Keane	Labor
1984	Maurie Keane	Labor

== Election results ==
=== Elections in the 1980s ===
==== 1984 ====
1984 New South Wales state election: Woronora
Party	Candidate	Votes	%	±%
Labor	Maurice Keane	17,490	51.2	−10.9
Liberal	Chris Downy	15,221	44.5	+6.6
Democrats	Ronald Hellyer	1,462	4.3	+4.3
Total formal votes		34,173	98.2	+0.6
Informal votes		634	1.8	−0.6
Turnout		34,807	95.2	+1.4
Two-party-preferred result
Labor	Maurice Keane		53.3	−8.8
Liberal	Chris Downy		46.7	+8.8
Labor hold		Swing	−8.8	

==== 1981 ====
1981 New South Wales state election: Woronora
Party	Candidate	Votes	%	±%
Labor	Maurie Keane	18,646	62.1	−4.5
Liberal	Chris Downy	11,405	37.9	+13.0
Total formal votes		30,051	97.6	
Informal votes		734	2.4	
Turnout		30,785	93.8	
Labor hold		Swing	−7.5	

=== Elections in the 1970s ===
==== 1978 ====
1978 New South Wales state election: Woronora
Party	Candidate	Votes	%	±%
Labor	Maurie Keane	21,286	66.6	+8.5
Liberal	Brian Hickey	7,973	24.9	−17.0
Democrats	Robert Davis	2,706	8.5	+8.5
Total formal votes		31,965	98.4	−0.1
Informal votes		520	1.6	+0.1
Turnout		32,485	93.1	−1.6
Two-party-preferred result
Labor	Maurie Keane	22,629	70.8	+12.7
Liberal	Brian Hickey	9,326	29.2	−12.7
Labor hold		Swing	+12.7	

==== 1976 ====
1976 New South Wales state election: Woronora
Party	Candidate	Votes	%	±%
Labor	Maurie Keane	18,113	58.1	+12.5
Liberal	Ronald Ricketts	13,067	41.9	+5.2
Total formal votes		31,180	98.5	+1.2
Informal votes		488	1.5	−1.2
Turnout		31,668	94.7	+2.4
Labor hold		Swing	+5.9	

==== 1973 ====
1973 New South Wales state election: Woronora
Party	Candidate	Votes	%	±%
Labor	Maurie Keane	12,747	45.6	
Liberal	Evelyn Thompson	10,261	36.7	
Independent	Jean Manuel	2,816	10.1	
Independent	Walter Skarschewski	1,337	4.8	
Democratic Labor	William Goslett	801	2.9	
Total formal votes		27,962	97.3	
Informal votes		761	2.7	
Turnout		28,723	92.3	
Two-party-preferred result
Labor	Maurie Keane	14,586	52.2	−3.5
Liberal	Evelyn Thompson	13,376	47.8	+3.5
Labor hold		Swing	−3.5	

District recreated

==== 1904 - 1973 ====
District abolished

=== Elections in the 1900s ===
==== 1901 ====
1901 New South Wales state election: Woronora
Party	Candidate	Votes	%	±%
Independent Labor	John Nicholson	1,099	56.4	−10.3
Liberal Reform	Thomas Bissell	834	42.8	
Labour	John Wonders	16	0.8	
Total formal votes		1,949	98.6	−0.8
Informal votes		27	1.4	+0.8
Turnout		1,976	71.2	+7.0
Member changed to Independent Labour from Liberal Reform				

=== Elections in the 1890s ===
==== 1898 ====
1898 New South Wales colonial election: Woronora
Party	Candidate	Votes	%	±%
Free Trade	John Nicholson	945	66.7	
National Federal	Albion Croft	472	33.3	
Total formal votes		945	100.0	
Informal votes		1,417	0.0	
Turnout		8	0.6	
Member changed to Free Trade from Independent Labour				

==== 1895 ====
1895 New South Wales colonial election: Woronora
Party	Candidate	Votes	%	±%
Independent Labour	John Nicholson	930	67.8	
Ind. Free Trade	Thomas Bissell	442	32.2	
Total formal votes		1,372	99.0	
Informal votes		14	1.0	
Turnout		1,386	71.5	
Independent Labour hold				

==== 1894 ====
1894 New South Wales colonial election: Woronora
Party	Candidate	Votes	%	±%
Independent Labour	John Nicholson	755	44.7	
Free Trade	Thomas Bissell	643	38.1	
Ind. Free Trade	Joseph Mitchell	223	13.2	
Ind. Protectionist	Thomas Riley	63	3.7	
Ind. Free Trade	Robert Lindsley	5	0.3	
Total formal votes		1,689	99.0	
Informal votes		17	1.0	
Turnout		1,706	86.9	
Independent Labour win		(new seat)		
