= 1976 New South Wales state election =

State election for New South Wales, Australia in May 1976

- 1 May 1976

All 99 seats in the New South Wales Legislative Assembly 50 seats were needed for a majority
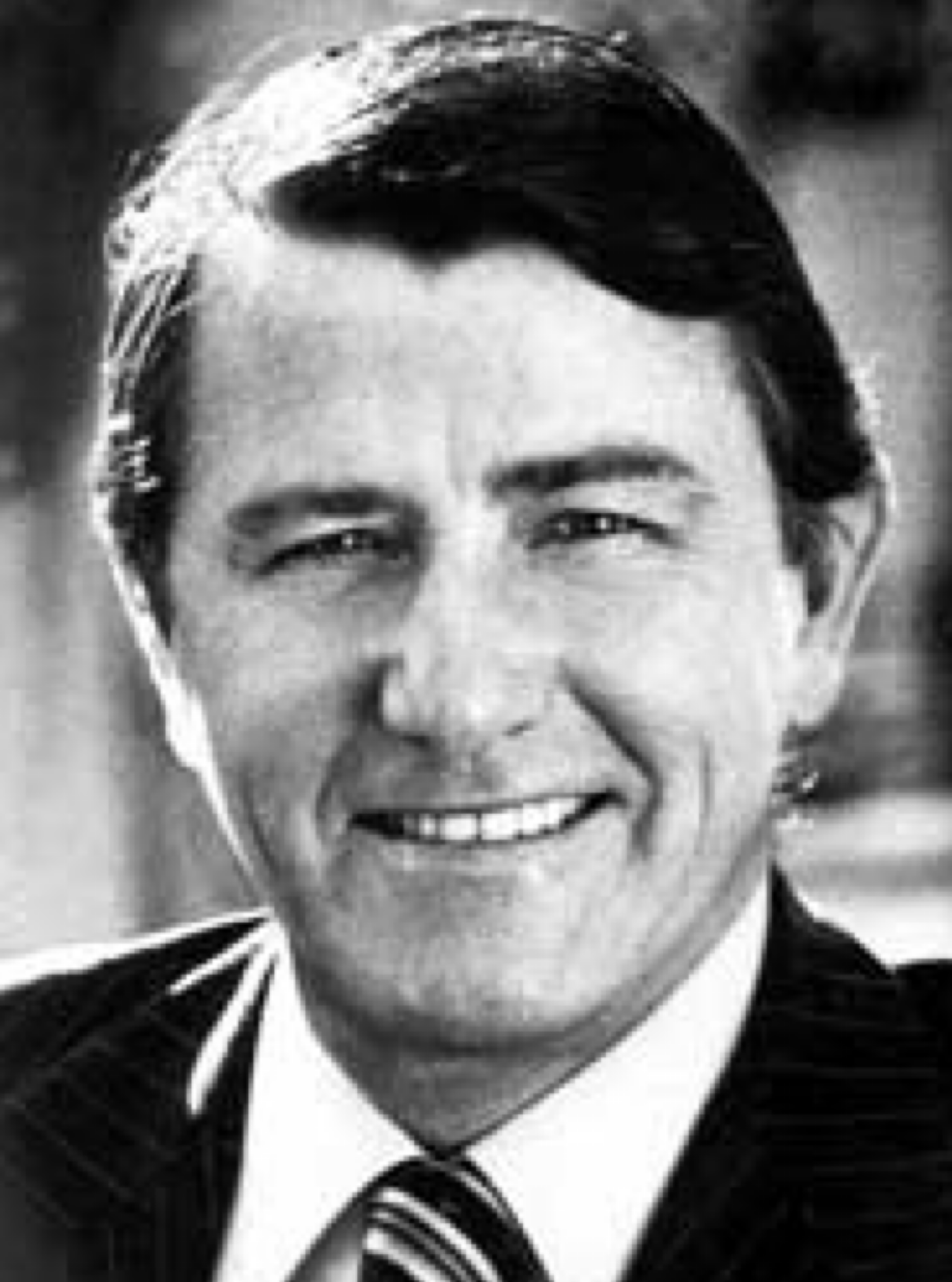

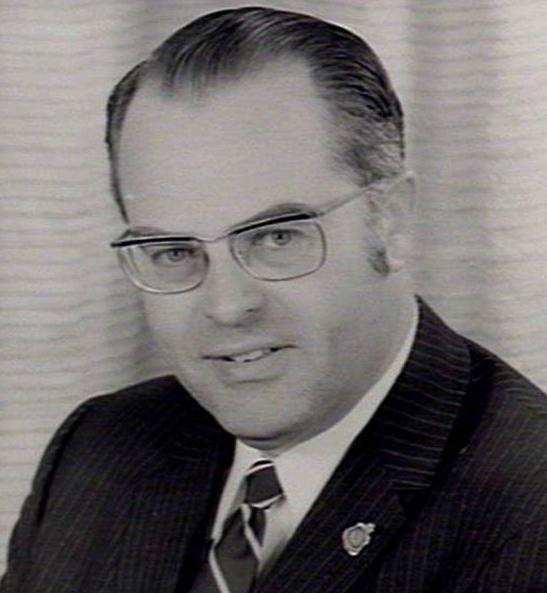
	First party	Second party
Leader	Neville Wran	Eric Willis
Party	Labor	Liberal/Country coalition
Leader since	3 December 1973	23 January 1976
Leader's seat	Bass Hill	Earlwood
Last election	44 seats	52 seats
Seats won	50	48
Seat change	▲6	▼4
Percentage	49.75%	46.32%
Swing	▲6.82	▲1.99
- Two-candidate-preferred margin by electorate
Premier before election
Eric Willis
Liberal/Country coalition
Elected Premier
Neville Wran
Labor

A general election for the New South Wales Legislative Assembly was held in the state of New South Wales, Australia, on Saturday 1 May 1976. The result was a narrow win for the Labor Party under Neville Wran—the party's first in the state in more than a decade.

== Issues ==
The incumbent Liberal-Country Party coalition had lost its long-time leader, Sir Robert Askin, who retired in January 1975. Eric Willis was seen as the favourite to replace him. Despite Askin's initial support, Willis refused his help, preferring to gain the leadership on his own merits. Askin then threw his support behind the Minister for Lands, Tom Lewis. Willis, sure he had sufficient support, refused to campaign, but the parliamentary party backed Lewis, leading to the latter's election as Liberal leader and, consequently, premier. However, there was a leadership spill in January 1976, resulting in the installation of Willis as party leader and premier.

Former Minister Steve Mauger resigned on 27 January 1976, sparking a by-election in his seat of Monaro in May, and early polls indicated a large swing to Labor. Willis announced an early election on 1 May, thereby avoiding the by-election, in the hope of preventing a larger move of voters against the government.

Wran successfully emerged from the shadow of the defeated Whitlam Labor government at a federal level. Labor's campaign focussed largely on Wran himself, with what Australians call a "presidential-style" campaign. The state Labor Party had undergone a long process of renewal, and emerged with strong moderate credentials. Labor also offered an alternative to a long-serving government widely perceived as corrupt.

Wran's campaign slogan, "Let's put the state in better shape", delivered by the leader, along with key spokesmen Peter Cox and Syd Einfeld, resonated with voters.

== Key dates ==
Date	Event
2 April 1976	The Legislative Assembly was dissolved, and writs were issued by the Governor to proceed with an election.
8 April 1976	Nominations for candidates for the election closed at noon.
1 May 1976	Polling day, between the hours of 8am and 6pm.
14 May 1976	The Willis–Punch ministry resigned and the First Wran ministry was sworn in.
21 May 1976	The writ was returned and the results formally declared.
25 May 1976	Parliament resumed for business.

== Results ==
The election was in doubt for several days. Ultimately, the seats of Gosford and Hurstville fell to Labor by only 74 and 44 votes respectively. Had the Coalition retained those seats, it would have stayed in power with a one-seat majority, but the loss of Gosford and Hurstville gave Labor a one-seat majority.

New South Wales state election, 1 May 1976 Legislative Assembly << 1973–1978 >>
Enrolled voters	2,943,248 (Note: There were 2,989,786 enrolled voters but 46,538 were enrolled in electorates (one Labor and one Country) which were uncontested at the election.)				
Votes cast	2,745,749		Turnout	93.29	+0.78
Informal votes	48,220		Informal	1.76	–0.94
Summary of votes by party
Party	Primary votes	%	Swing	Seats	Change
Labor	1,342,038	49.75	+6.82	50	+ 6
Liberal	978,886	36.29	+2.44	30	– 4
Country	270,603	10.03	–0.45	18	± 0
Workers	15,598	0.58	+0.58	0	± 0
Australia	7,407	0.27	–3.93	0	± 0
Socialist Workers	2,495	0.09	+0.09	0	± 0
Communist	2,220	0.08	+0.05	0	± 0
Democratic Labor	2,201	0.08	–5.88	0	– 1
Independent	76,089	2.82	+0.28	1	– 1
Total	2,697,529			99	

Popular vote
Labor	49.75%
Liberal	36.29%
Country	10.03%
Independents	2.82%
Others	1.11%
Parliamentary seats
Labor	50
Liberal	30
Country	18
Independents	1

== Seats changing hands ==
Seat	Pre-1976			Swing	Post-1976		
Seat	Party	Member	Margin	Swing	Margin	Member	Party
Ashfield	Liberal	David Hunter	3.6	-8.7	5.1	Paul Whelan	Labor
Blue Mountains	Independent	Harold Coates	6.5	-7.0	0.5	Mick Clough	Labor
Gordon	Democratic Labor	Kevin Harrold	N/A	N/A	31.5	Tim Moore	Liberal
Gosford	Liberal	Malcolm Brooks	5.7	-5.8	0.1	Brian McGowan	Labor
Hurstville	Liberal	Tom Mead	3.1	-3.2	0.1	Kevin Ryan	Labor
Monaro	Liberal	Steve Mauger	7.3	-8.8	1.5	John Akister	Labor

- Members listed in italics did not recontest their seats.
- In addition, Labor retained the seat of Coogee, which it had won from the Liberals at a 1974 by-election.

== Post-election pendulum ==
Labor seats (50)
Marginal
Gosford	Brian McGowan	ALP	0.1%
Hurstville	Kevin Ryan	ALP	0.1%
Blue Mountains	Mick Clough	ALP	0.5% v IND
Monaro	John Akister	ALP	1.5%
Casino	Don Day	ALP	1.6%
Castlereagh	Jack Renshaw	ALP	2.3%
Georges River	Frank Walker	ALP	2.8%
Coogee	Michael Cleary	ALP	3.7%
Murrumbidgee	Lin Gordon	ALP	3.7%
Ashfield	Paul Whelan	ALP	5.1%
Fairly safe
Kogarah	Bill Crabtree	ALP	6.1%
Waverley	Syd Einfeld	ALP	7.0%
Parramatta	Barry Wilde	ALP	7.2%
Drummoyne	Michael Maher	ALP	7.3%
Woronora	Maurie Keane	ALP	8.1%
Peats	Keith O'Connell	ALP	8.7%
Burrinjuck	Terry Sheahan	ALP	8.8%
Campbelltown	Cliff Mallam	ALP	8.9%
Safe
Wentworthville	Ernie Quinn	ALP	10.7%
Charlestown	Richard Face	ALP	11.7%
Corrimal	Laurie Kelly	ALP	13.1%
Heathcote	Rex Jackson	ALP	13.2%
Penrith	Ron Mulock	ALP	13.9%
Maroubra	Bill Haigh	ALP	14.0%
Canterbury	Kevin Stewart	ALP	14.3%
Lake Macquarie	Merv Hunter	ALP	14.4%
Bass Hill	Neville Wran	ALP	14.6%
Blacktown	Gordon Barnier	ALP	14.7%
Lakemba	Vince Durick	ALP	14.7%
East Hills	Pat Rogan	ALP	14.8%
Merrylands	Jack Ferguson	ALP	15.1%
Auburn	Peter Cox	ALP	15.3%
Bankstown	Nick Kearns	ALP	15.5%
Wollongong	Eric Ramsay	ALP	16.0%
Rockdale	Brian Bannon	ALP	16.5%
Mount Druitt	Tony Johnson	ALP	17.4%
Waratah	Sam Jones	ALP	17.4%
Newcastle	Arthur Wade	ALP	17.7%
Munmorah	Harry Jensen	ALP	18.5%
Illawarra	George Petersen	ALP	18.6% v IND
Granville	Pat Flaherty	ALP	18.8%
Fairfield	Eric Bedford	ALP	19.2%
Wallsend	Ken Booth	ALP	19.3%
Liverpool	George Paciullo	ALP	19.6%
Heffron	Laurie Brereton	ALP	19.8%
Balmain	Roger Degen	ALP	24.2%
Marrickville	Tom Cahill	ALP	24.3%
Phillip	Pat Hills	ALP	26.0%
Cessnock	George Neilly	ALP	27.0%
Broken Hill	Lew Johnstone	ALP	unopp.

Liberal/Country seats (48)
Marginal
Nepean	Ron Rofe	LIB	2.3%
Bathurst	Clive Osborne	CP	3.0%
Fuller	Peter Coleman	LIB	3.4%
Cronulla	Ian Griffith	LIB	3.8%
Miranda	Tim Walker	LIB	4.0%
Yaralla	Lerryn Mutton	LIB	4.4%
Earlwood	Eric Willis	LIB	4.5%
Goulburn	Ron Brewer	CP	4.6%
Fairly safe
Armidale	David Leitch	CP	6.6%
Wollondilly	Tom Lewis	LIB	7.6%
Manly	Douglas Darby	LIB	7.7%
Wakehurst	Allan Viney	LIB	7.8%
Burrendong	Roger Wotton	CP	7.9%
Albury	Gordon Mackie	LIB	8.2%
Burwood	John Jackett	LIB	8.4%
Young	George Freudenstein	CP	8.4%
Barwon	Wal Murray	CP	8.5%
Wagga Wagga	Joe Schipp	LIB	8.8%
Maitland	Milton Morris	LIB	9.8%
Orange	Garry West	CP	9.8%
Byron	Jack Boyd	CP	9.9%
Safe
Hawkesbury	Kevin Rozzoli	LIB	10.8%
Kirribilli	Bruce McDonald	LIB	11.1%
Hornsby	Neil Pickard	LIB	11.6%
Murray	Mary Meillon	LIB	12.6% v IND
Upper Hunter	Col Fisher	CP	12.7%
Tamworth	Noel Park	CP	12.8%
Willoughby	Laurie McGinty	LIB	13.1%
Raleigh	Jim Brown	CP	13.3%
Dubbo	John Mason	LIB	13.4%
Vaucluse	Keith Doyle	LIB	13.6%
Clarence	Matt Singleton	CP	13.7%
Bligh	John Barraclough	LIB	13.8%
Eastwood	Jim Clough	LIB	14.7%
The Hills	Max Ruddock	LIB	15.1%
Pittwater	Bruce Webster	LIB	15.2%
Tenterfield	Matt Singleton	CP	16.0%
Davidson	Dick Healey	LIB	16.4%
Lane Cove	John Dowd	LIB	16.4%
Northcott	Jim Cameron	LIB	18.2%
Sturt	Tim Fischer	CP	18.8%
Gloucester	Leon Punch	CP	19.2%
Oxley	Bruce Cowan	CP	19.2%
Temora	Jim Taylor	CP	19.2%
Mosman	Lindsay Thompson	LIB	20.1%
Ku-ring-gai	John Maddison	LIB	27.7%
Gordon	Tim Moore	LIB	31.5%
Lismore	Bruce Duncan	CP	unopp.
Crossbench seats (1)
South Coast	John Hatton	IND	16.2 v LIB

== See also ==
- Candidates of the 1976 New South Wales state election
