= Wran ministry (1976–1978) =

71st New South Wales government ministry, led by Neville Wran

First Wran ministry
- 71st Cabinet of the State of New South Wales

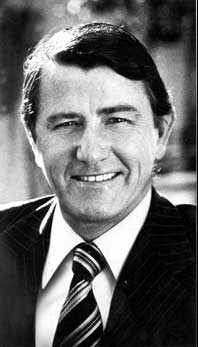
- Premier Neville Wran
- Date formed: 14 May 1976
- Date dissolved: 19 October 1978

People and organisations
- Monarch: Queen Elizabeth II
- Governor: Sir Roden Cutler
- Premier: Neville Wran
- Deputy Premier: Jack Ferguson
- No. of ministers: 17
- Member party: Labor
- Opposition parties: Liberal National coalition
- Opposition leader: Sir Eric Willis; Peter Coleman

History
- Election: 1976 New South Wales election
- Predecessor: Willis–Punch ministry
- Successor: Second Wran ministry

The Wran ministry (1976–1978) or First Wran ministry was the 71st ministry of the New South Wales Government, and was led by the 35th Premier of New South Wales, Neville Wran, representing the Labor Party. It was the first of eight consecutive occasions when Wran was Premier.

== Background ==
After 11 years in government, the Liberal–National Country Party coalition was narrowly defeated at the election on 1 May 1976 by the Wran–led Labor Party, with a swing to Labor of 6.82% giving Labor a one seat majority.

Wran had been elected to the Legislative Council of New South Wales by a joint sitting of the New South Wales Parliament on 12 March 1970. He was Leader of the Opposition in the Legislative Council from 22 February 1972. He resigned from the council on 19 October 1973 to switch to the Legislative Assembly, successfully contesting the election for Bass Hill, which he would hold until his retirement in 1986. Labor, led by Pat Hills, was defeated at the 1973 election and Wran successfully challenged Hills to become Leader of Labor Party and Leader of the Opposition from 3 December 1973.

== Composition of ministry ==
The composition of the ministry was announced by Premier Wran and sworn in on 14 May 1976. There were minor rearrangements of the ministry in August 1976 (Note: In August 1976 Pat Hills gained the portfolio of Industrial Relations previously held by Paul Landa.) (Note: In August 1976 Paul Landa gained the new portfolio of Planning and Environment, combining the portfolios of planning, previously held by Harry Jensen and environment, previously held by Bill Crabtree.) and February 1977. (Note: In February 1977 Ron Mulock gained the portfolio of housing, previously held by Jack Ferguson.) (Note: In February 1977 Bill Haigh gained the portfolio of services, previously held by Ron Mulock.) The ministry ended on 19 October 1978, when Wran was successful at the 1978 election and the Second Wran ministry was formed.

Portfolio	Minister	Party	Term commence	Term end	Term of office
Premier	Neville Wran	Labor	14 May 1976	19 October 1978	2 years, 158 days
Deputy Premier; Minister for Public Works; Minister for Ports	Jack Ferguson	Labor	14 May 1976	19 October 1978	2 years, 158 days
Minister for Housing	Jack Ferguson	Labor	14 May 1976	10 February 1977	272 days
Minister for Housing	Ron Mulock	Labor	10 February 1977	19 October 1978	1 year, 251 days
Treasurer	Jack Renshaw	Labor	14 May 1976	19 October 1978	2 years, 158 days
Minister for Transport; Minister for Highways	Peter Cox	Labor	14 May 1976	19 October 1978	2 years, 158 days
Attorney General	Frank Walker	Labor	14 May 1976	19 October 1978	2 years, 158 days
Vice-President of the Executive Council; Leader of the Government in Legislative Council	Paul Landa, MLC	Labor	14 May 1976	19 October 1978	2 years, 158 days
Minister for Industrial Relations	Paul Landa, MLC	Labor	14 May 1976	9 August 1976	87 days
Minister for Industrial Relations	Pat Hills	Labor	9 August 1976	19 October 1978	2 years, 71 days
Minister for Mines; Minister for Energy	Pat Hills	Labor	14 May 1976	19 October 1978	2 years, 158 days
Minister for Decentralisation and Development; Minister for Primary Industries	Don Day	Labor	14 May 1976	19 October 1978	2 years, 158 days
Minister for Education	Eric Bedford	Labor	14 May 1976	19 October 1978	2 years, 158 days
Minister for Local Government	Harry Jensen	Labor	14 May 1976	19 October 1978	2 years, 158 days
Minister for Planning	Harry Jensen	Labor	14 May 1976	9 August 1976	87 days
Minister for Lands	Bill Crabtree	Labor	14 May 1976	19 October 1978	2 years, 158 days
Minister for Environment	Bill Crabtree	Labor	14 May 1976	9 August 1976	87 days
Minister for Planning and Environment	Paul Landa, MLC	Labor	9 August 1976	19 October 1978	2 years, 71 days
Minister for Health	Kevin Stewart	Labor	14 May 1976	19 October 1978	2 years, 158 days
Minister for Consumer Affairs; Minister for Co-operative Societies	Syd Einfeld	Labor	14 May 1976	19 October 1978	2 years, 158 days
Minister for Justice	Ron Mulock	Labor	14 May 1976	19 October 1978	2 years, 158 days
Minister for Services	Ron Mulock	Labor	14 May 1976	10 February 1977	272 days
Minister for Services	Bill Haigh	Labor	10 February 1977	19 October 1978	1 year, 251 days
Minister for Sport and Recreation; Minister for Tourism	Ken Booth	Labor	14 May 1976	19 October 1978	2 years, 158 days
Minister for Conservation; Minister for Water Resources	Lin Gordon	Labor	14 May 1976	19 October 1978	2 years, 158 days
Minister for Youth and Community Services	Rex Jackson	Labor	14 May 1976	19 October 1978	2 years, 158 days
Minister Assisting the Premier	Bill Haigh	Labor	14 May 1976	10 February 1977	272 days

Ministers are members of the Legislative Assembly unless otherwise noted.

=== See also ===
- Members of the New South Wales Legislative Assembly, 1976–1978
- Members of the New South Wales Legislative Council, 1976–1978

== Notes ==
Preceded by Willis–Punch ministry	First Wran ministry 1976–1978	Succeeded by second Wran ministry (1978–1980)
