= 1978 Earlwood state by-election =

- 15 July 1978

Electoral district of Earlwood in the New South Wales Legislative Assembly
- Registered: 33,545
- Turnout: 88.24% (▼7.02)

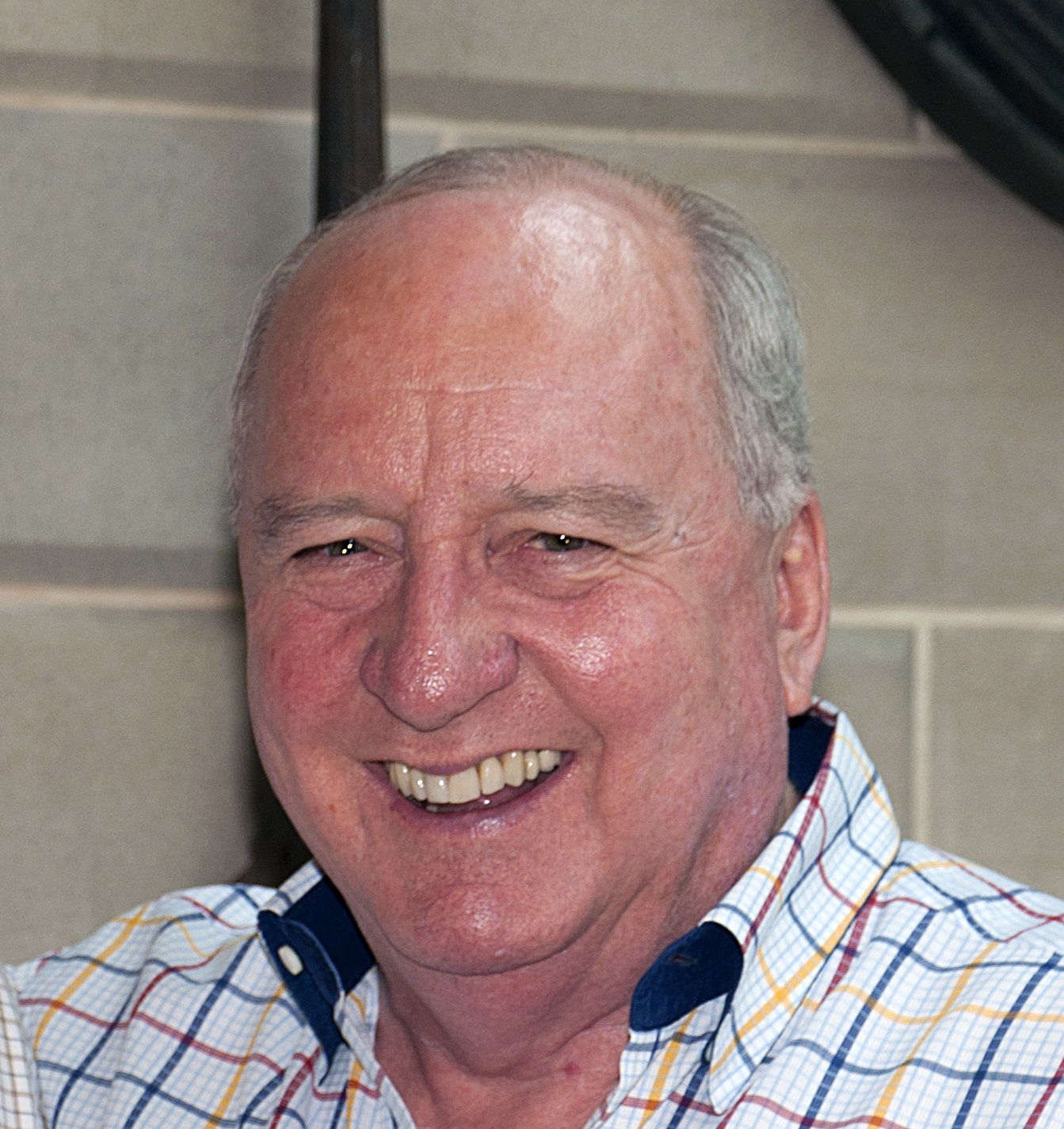
	First party	Second party
Candidate	Ken Gabb	Alan Jones
Party	Labor	Liberal
First preference vote	15,168	12,118
Percentage	52.62%	42.04%
Swing	▲7.17	▼12.51
MP before election
Sir Eric Willis
Liberal
Elected MP
Ken Gabb
Labor

The 1978 Earlwood state by-election was held on 15 July 1978 to elect the member for Earlwood in the New South Wales Legislative Assembly, following the resignation of Liberal MP and former premier Sir Eric Willis.

The seat was gained by Labor candidate Ken Gabb, who became the youngest member of the Parliament of New South Wales at the age of 28. Gabb defeated seven candidates, including future talkback host and Australia national rugby union team coach Alan Jones, who contested the by-election for the Liberals.

Gabb retained the seat three months later at the "Wranslide" state election on 7 October 1978, where he again defeated Jones and independent candidate Charles Bingle.

== Key events ==
- 16 June 1978 − Sir Eric Willis resigned
- 23 June 1978 − Writ of election issued by the Speaker of the Legislative Assembly
- 29 June 1978 − Candidate nominations
- 15 July 1978 − Election day
- 31 July 1978 − Return of writ

== Result ==
1978 Earlwood by-election
Party	Candidate	Votes	%	±%
Labor	Ken Gabb	15,168	52.62	+7.17
Liberal	Alan Jones	12,118	42.04	−12.51
Democrats	Kerry Warr	1,053	3.65	+3.65
Independent	Neville Fleming	269	0.93	+0.93
Gay Liberation	Peter Blazey	105	0.36	+0.36
Independent	Charles Bingle	52	0.18	+0.18
Conservative	Josephine Mallett	33	0.11	+0.11
Independent	Edwin Bellchambers	27	0.09	+0.09
Total formal votes		28,825	97.38	−1.14
Informal votes		775	2.62	+1.14
Turnout		29,600	88.24	−7.02
Labor gain from Liberal		Swing	+7.17	

== See also ==
- Electoral results for the district of Earlwood
- List of New South Wales state by-elections
