= Pam Allan =

Australian politician

The Honourable Pam Allan

Minister for the Environment
- In office 4 April 1995 – 8 April 1999
- Preceded by: Chris Hartcher
- Succeeded by: Bob Debus

Member of the New South Wales Legislative Assembly for Wentworthville
- In office 19 March 1988 – 3 May 1991
- Preceded by: Ernie Quinn
- Succeeded by: District abolished

Member of the New South Wales Legislative Assembly for Blacktown
- In office 25 May 1991 – 5 March 1999
- Preceded by: John Aquilina
- Succeeded by: Paul Gibson

Member of the New South Wales Legislative Assembly for Wentworthville
- In office 27 March 1999 – 2 March 2007
- Preceded by: District created
- Succeeded by: District abolished

Personal details
- Born: 4 February 1953 (age 73)
- Party: Labor Party
- Education: University of Sydney

Pamela Diane Allan (born 4 February 1953) is an Australian politician. She was a Labor member of the New South Wales Legislative Assembly from 1988 to 2007.

Allan first gained a place in the Legislative Assembly following her win in the seat of Wentworthville in the 1988 election. When this seat was dissolved as a result of a redistribution prior to the 1991 election; she attained preselection and won the seat of Blacktown, returning to a recreated Wentworthville at the 1999 election. She served as the state Minister for the Environment under Bob Carr's premiership from 4 April 1995 to 8 April 1999.

Allan retired from state politics in 2007.

Political offices
Preceded by Chris Hartcher	Minister for the Environment; 1995–1999	Succeeded by Bob Debus
New South Wales Legislative Assembly
Preceded by Ernie Quinn	Member for Wentworthville; 1988–1991	District abolished
Preceded by John Aquilina	Member for Blacktown; 1991–1999	Succeeded by Paul Gibson
New district	Member for Wentworthville; 1999–2007	District abolished
