= Phil White (politician) =

Australian politician

Philip John White (26 December 1938 – 9 October 2000) was an Australian politician. He was the Liberal member for Earlwood in the New South Wales Legislative Assembly from 1988 to 1991.

White came to Sydney as a printing apprentice at the age of sixteen. He was three times married, one child from his first marriage, two children from his second marriage and four stepsons from his third marriage.

In 1988, White was elected to the New South Wales Legislative Assembly, winning the seat of Earlwood for the Liberal Party. He defeated sitting member Ken Gabb, who had held the seat for ten years. However, in 1991 the seat was abolished, and White contested the notionally Labor seat of Hurstville, losing to future Premier Morris Iemma.

White died at Camden on 9 October 2000. Philip was survived by his four children and wife Catherine Patricia White.

New South Wales Legislative Assembly
Preceded by Ken Gabb	Member for Earlwood; 1988–1991	Succeeded by Abolished
