= Ron Rofe =

Australian politician

Ronald Ernest Arthur Rofe (1914 – 21 September 2003) was an Australian politician and member of the New South Wales Legislative Assembly from 1973 until 1978. He was a member of the Liberal Party.

Rofe was born in Camden where his family had been farming for some generations. He continued this tradition as a dairy farmer in the district. He was a prominent member and district governor of the Lions Club. He was the Deputy Shire President of Wollondilly Shire Council in 1971–1974.

A redistribution of Legislative Assembly seats prior to the 1973 election changed the seat of Nepean from a marginal ALP seat to a notionally conservative seat. The sitting member Ron Mulock decided to contest the safer seat of Penrith and Rofe was selected as the Liberal candidate. He won the election with 53% of the two party preferred vote. He successfully defended the seat against the ALP's Peter Anderson at the 1976 election, but was defeated by Anderson in 1978.

New South Wales Legislative Assembly
Preceded by Ron Mulock	Member for Nepean; 1973-1978	Succeeded by Peter Anderson
