= Bruce McDonald (Australian politician) =

Australian politician

Bruce McDonald AM

Leader of the Opposition of New South Wales Elections: 1981
- In office 1 June 1981 – 12 October 1981
- Deputy: Jim Cameron
- Preceded by: John Mason
- Succeeded by: John Dowd

Member of the New South Wales Parliament for Kirribilli
- In office 1 May 1976 – 28 August 1981
- Preceded by: John Waddy
- Succeeded by: District abolished

Personal details
- Born: 26 May 1935 (age 90) Drummoyne, New South Wales
- Party: Liberal Party

Bruce John McDonald, AM (born 26 May 1935) is a former Australian politician having held senior positions with the Liberal Party of Australia at the New South Wales, South Australian and federal levels.

He was Leader of the Opposition of New South Wales from 1 June to 12 October 1981, when he lost the election to Labor Premier Neville Wran. McDonald lost the parliamentary seat he contested at the same election.

== Early life ==
McDonald was born in the Sydney suburb of Drummoyne in 1935 and was educated at Drummoyne Boys' High School and Sydney Technical High School. He studied civil engineering and urban planning at Sydney Technical College and the University of Sydney and was later employed as a Cadet Engineer for the Metropolitan Water Sewerage and Drainage Board from 1951 to 1956. Subsequently, he became a Member of the Institute of Engineers and the Royal Australian Planning Institute. He served as the Foundation President of the Urban Development Institute of Australia from 1962 to 1964 and again from 1974 to 1976, becoming a Life Member.

== Political career ==
He was elected for the New South Wales Legislative Assembly seat of Kirribilli, after he defeated the sitting member John Waddy for preselection before the 1976 election. Waddy resigned from the party and contested the seat as an independent, but lost by a large margin to McDonald.

As a member, McDonald served in various Parliamentary committees and Shadow portfolios, including as Shadow Treasurer, Shadow Minister for Housing and Urban Affairs, Business and Consumer Affairs and Deputy Chairman of the Parliamentary Public Accounts Committee. McDonald was then elected as Deputy Leader of the New South Wales Liberal Party, and was Deputy Leader of the Opposition in 1978 under Leader John Mason, until Mason was deposed by a party poll in late May 1981. Elected the party's leader on 1 June 1981, McDonald led the party to its massive defeat at the 1981 election. His seat was abolished, and he opted to follow most of his constituents into the newly created seat of North Shore. However, he was defeated by the independent candidate, North Sydney Council mayor Ted Mack. McDonald's defeat in North Shore meant that the 1981 election was the second election in a row in which the sitting Opposition Leader had failed to win a seat in Parliament, after Peter Coleman in 1978. As McDonald had made an unsuccessful attempt to move to another seat in the Legislative Assembly, it would not be until Luke Foley in 2015 that a sitting Opposition Leader succeeded in moving to a new seat in the Legislative Assembly.

Following his loss McDonald moved to South Australia, settling in the Adelaide suburb of Kent Town, and becoming a Member of the SA State Executive (1984–1993), Executive Vice-president from 1984 to 1987 and President of Liberal Party of South Australia from 1987 to 1990. He was also made a Life Member of the State Council of SA. Afterwards he switched to federal politics, becoming Federal Vice-president of the Liberal Party of Australia (1998–2005) and a Member of Federal Executive from 1987 to 1990 and 1998–2005. He has recently moved to NSW Central Coast where he remains active in the NSW Liberal Party.

His brother Donald McDonald had served as chairman of the Australian Broadcasting Corporation from 1996 to 2006.

== Honours ==
- On 1 January 2001 he was awarded the Centenary Medal.
- On 11 June 2007, he was appointed a Member of the Order of Australia (AM) in the General Division for "service to the Liberal Party of Australia, to the New South Wales Parliament, and to the transport industry".

== Notes ==
New South Wales Legislative Assembly
Preceded by John Waddy	Member for Kirribilli; 1976 – 1981	District abolished
Party political offices
Preceded by John Mason	Deputy Leader of the New South Wales Liberal Party; 1978 – 1981	Succeeded by Jim Cameron
Preceded by John Mason	Leader of the New South Wales Liberal Party; 1981	Succeeded by John Dowd
Political offices
Preceded by John Mason	Leader of the Opposition of New South Wales; 1981	Succeeded by John Dowd
