= Electoral district of Kirribilli =

Former state electoral district of New South Wales, Australia

Kirribilli was an electoral district of the Legislative Assembly in the Australian state of New South Wales, created in 1962, partly replacing Neutral Bay and North Sydney, and named after and including the Sydney suburb of Kirribilli. It was abolished in 1981 and replaced by North Shore.

== Members for Kirribilli ==
Member	Party	Period
John Waddy	Liberal	1962–1976
John Waddy	Independent	1976
Bruce McDonald	Liberal	1976–1981

== Election results ==
1978 New South Wales state election: Kirribilli
Party	Candidate	Votes	%	±%
Liberal	Bruce McDonald	11,965	53.8	+11.2
Labor	Glen Batchelor	10,280	46.2	+9.8
Total formal votes		22,245	96.9	−1.7
Informal votes		712	3.1	+1.7
Turnout		22,957	86.6	−2.4
Liberal hold		Swing	−7.3	
