= Ken Gabb =

Australian politician

Kenneth George Gabb (born 4 December 1949) is an Australian former politician. He was the Labor member for Earlwood in the New South Wales Legislative Assembly from 1978 to 1988, and a state minister from 1986 to 1988.

Gabb was born in Earlwood, New South Wales, to Loyal Leslie Gabb and Joyce Edna McCartney. He attended Canterbury Boys High School (1962–67) before studying for a Bachelor of Law at Sydney University (1968–72). He underwent further study at the University of New South Wales from 1973 to 1977, and was called to the bar in 1980. On 6 December 1985, he married Elisabeth Faith Williams in Sydney

Gabb had joined the Labor Party in 1971, and in 1978 former Liberal Premier Eric Willis resigned from parliament, creating a by-election for his seat of Earlwood. Gabb was selected as the Labor candidate, and had an easy victory over Liberal candidate Alan Jones. In 1986 he became Minister for Mineral Resources, and later in the year was also made Aboriginal Affairs Minister. Gabb was defeated by the Liberal Party in the 1988 state election.

After leaving politics, Gabb worked for Barclays Bank (1989–1991) before moving to the Crown Solicitor's Office (1991–95), the New South Wales Department of Attorney-General and Justice (1995–96) and back to the Crown Solicitor (1996–99). On 26 January 1999, Gabb's wife Elisabeth died. He married Dyana Corak on 25 March 2001.

New South Wales Legislative Assembly
Preceded by Eric Willis	Member for Earlwood; 1978–1988	Succeeded by Phil White
