= Electoral district of Munmorah =

State electoral district of New South Wales, Australia

Munmorah was an electoral district of the Legislative Assembly in the Australian State of New South Wales, which partly replaced Wyong in 1973. It was named after Lake Munmorah or the locality of the same name. In 1981, it was replaced by Swansea and Tuggerah. Its only member was Harry Jensen, representing the Labor Party.

== Members for Munmorah ==
Member	Party	Term
Harry Jensen	Labor	1973–1981

== Election results ==
1978 New South Wales state election: Munmorah
Party	Candidate	Votes	%	±%
Labor	Harry Jensen	25,293	77.3	+8.8
Liberal	Brian Taylor	7,426	22.7	−8.8
Total formal votes		32,719	98.1	−0.5
Informal votes		626	1.9	+0.5
Turnout		33,345	93.5	−1.5
Labor hold		Swing	+8.8	
