= Electoral district of Earlwood =

Former state electoral district of New South Wales, Australia

Earlwood was an electoral district of the Legislative Assembly of the Australian state of New South Wales from 1950 to 1991. It included Earlwood and Beverly Hills.

At the 1991 election, it was abolished and its area split between the seats of Canterbury, Hurstville and Rockdale.

== Members for Earlwood ==
Member	Party	Period
Eric Willis	Liberal	1950–1978
Ken Gabb	Labor	1978–1988
Phil White	Liberal	1988–1991

== Election results ==
1988 New South Wales state election: Earlwood
Party	Candidate	Votes	%	±%
Liberal	Phil White	15,528	51.3	+8.5
Labor	Ken Gabb	14,764	48.7	−5.7
Total formal votes		30,292	95.7	−1.5
Informal votes		1,353	4.3	+1.5
Turnout		31,645	95.6	
Liberal gain from Labor		Swing	+7.2	
