= Electoral district of Woronora =

Former state electoral district of New South Wales, Australia

Woronora was an electoral district for the Legislative Assembly in the Australian state of New South Wales, named after the Woronora River or the suburb of Woronora. It was created in 1894 and abolished in 1904. It was recreated in 1973 and abolished in 1988 when it was renamed Sutherland.

== Members for Woronora ==
First incarnation (1894–1904)
Member	Party	Term
John Nicholson (Note: 1898 was the only election at which John Nicholson was listed as anything other than Independent Labour and Antony Green suggests he may have been better classified as Independent Labour for 1898.)	Independent Labour	1894–1898
John Nicholson	Free Trade	1898–1901
John Nicholson	Independent Labour	1901–1904
Second incarnation (1973–1988)
Member	Party	Term
Maurie Keane	Labor	1973–1988

== Election results ==
1984 New South Wales state election: Woronora
Party	Candidate	Votes	%	±%
Labor	Maurice Keane	17,490	51.2	−10.9
Liberal	Chris Downy	15,221	44.5	+6.6
Democrats	Ronald Hellyer	1,462	4.3	+4.3
Total formal votes		34,173	98.2	+0.6
Informal votes		634	1.8	−0.6
Turnout		34,807	95.2	+1.4
Two-party-preferred result
Labor	Maurice Keane		53.3	−8.8
Liberal	Chris Downy		46.7	+8.8
Labor hold		Swing	−8.8	
