= Maurie Keane =

Australian politician

Maurice Francis "Maurie" Keane (21 September 1923 – 12 October 2014) was an Australian politician. He was the Labor member for Woronora in the New South Wales Legislative Assembly from 1973 to 1988.

Born in Croydon Park in Sydney to Maurice and Desiree Keane, he attended Homebush High School and De La Salle College in Ashfield. After leaving school he became a proof-reader for a printing company in Sydney in 1940, before becoming a salesman in 1941. He enlisted in the AIF in 1942 and was a signalman with the 2nd Australian Corps of Signals. He returned to sales after the war's end in 1945. On 15 December 1951 he married Patricia Lucy Christmas, with whom he had three children.

In 1957, Keane joined the Labor Party; he went on to hold a number of positions within the party, including President of the Sutherland Branch, President of the Hughes Federal Electoral Council, and President of the Sutherland and Woronora State Electoral Councils. In 1962 he was elected to Sutherland Shire Council, and in 1965 became Secretary of the Sydney Water Board.

In 1973, a new state seat, Woronora, was created in the Sutherland area, with a notional Labor majority. Keane was selected as the Labor candidate and won the seat with a 2% margin. He held the seat until 1988, when it was renamed Sutherland and Keane was defeated by Liberal candidate Chris Downy. Subsequent to his defeat, he was executive director of the Aboriginal Land Council (1990–93) and Director of the Mandela Foundation of Australia (1994–95).

New South Wales Legislative Assembly
Preceded by New seat	Member for Woronora; 1973–1988	Succeeded by Seat abolished
