= Electoral district of Wentworthville =

Former state electoral district of New South Wales, Australia

Wentworthville was an electoral district of the Legislative Assembly in the Australian state of New South Wales, first created in 1962. The seat was absorbed into surrounding electorates in a redistribution prior to the 1991 election and recreated in the redistribution prior to the 1999 election. At the 2003 election, Pam Allan won the seat with 54% of the first preference votes. This was a marginal improvement over the 1999 election. It was abolished again for the 2007 election, with the larger part of it going to the new electoral district of Toongabbie.

Between 2003 and 2007, the electorate covers 21,589 km^{2}, taking in suburbs from several local government areas including Girraween, Greystanes, Northmead, Pendle Hill, Toongabbie, Winston Hills, Wentworthville and part of Prospect.

== Members ==
First incarnation (1962—1991)
Member	Party	Term
Ernie Quinn	Labor	1962–1988
Pam Allan	Labor	1988–1991
Second incarnation (1999—2007)
Member	Party	Term
Pam Allan	Labor	1999–2007

== Election results ==
2003 New South Wales state election: Wentworthville
Party	Candidate	Votes	%	±%
Labor	Pam Allan	21,744	54.8	+2.3
Liberal	Brett Murray	11,746	29.6	+2.3
Greens	Darren Reader	1,926	4.9	+2.2
Christian Democrats	Sam Baissari	1,728	4.4	−0.1
Against Further Immigration	Lyndon Shepherd	1,235	3.1	+1.8
Unity	Cynthia Su	813	2.0	−0.4
Democrats	Ian Swallow	506	1.3	−1.5
Total formal votes		39,698	96.8	+0.1
Informal votes		1,292	3.2	−0.1
Turnout		40,990	93.1	
Two-party-preferred result
Labor	Pam Allan	23,664	64.8	−0.6
Liberal	Brett Murray	12,866	35.2	+0.6
Labor hold		Swing	−0.6	
