= Ernie Quinn =

Australian politician

Ernest Neville Quinn (3 June 1926 – 24 July 1992) was an Australian politician, elected as a Labor Party member of the New South Wales Legislative Assembly for the western Sydney seat of Wentworthville.

== Early life ==
Quinn was born in Lithgow into a coal mining family and was one of six children. He spent his early working life as a telecommunications technician.

== Family life ==
Ernest Neville Quinn married Dorothy Margaret Kenny in 1951. They built their home in the heart of the Western suburbs of Sydney at Wentworthville. Dorothy bore three daughters, Margaret, Annette and Pauline.

== Parliamentary career ==
Quinn was elected as member for Wentworthville at the age of 36. He held the seat for 26 years and was elected nine consecutive times in the period from 1962 until his retirement in 1988. Initially a member of the NSW Right-wing faction of the Labor Party, Quinn defected to the Left in 1978.

Quinn's parliamentary career was distinguished by a stint as Labor's shadow spokesperson for labour and industry as well as involvement in parliamentary committees on electoral funding and liquor trading and his work on the parliamentary superannuation scheme. He did not hold ministerial office and was briefly acting Chairman of Committees. Much of his parliamentary work was focussed on the needs of his electorate, which at the time of his initial election was an unsewered semi-rural area without one single set of traffic lights. The development and implementation of better infrastructure in the working-class area was the prime focus of Quinn's career. Memorials within the electorate include a plaque commemorating his dedication of Ringrose Public School, and the public reserve named "Ernie Quinn Village Green".

Quinn died in the Sydney suburb of Kogarah.

New South Wales Legislative Assembly
New district	Member for Wentworthville; 1962–1988	Succeeded by Pam Allan
