= Eric Willis =

Australian politician (1922–1999)

The Honourable Sir Eric Willis KBE, CMG
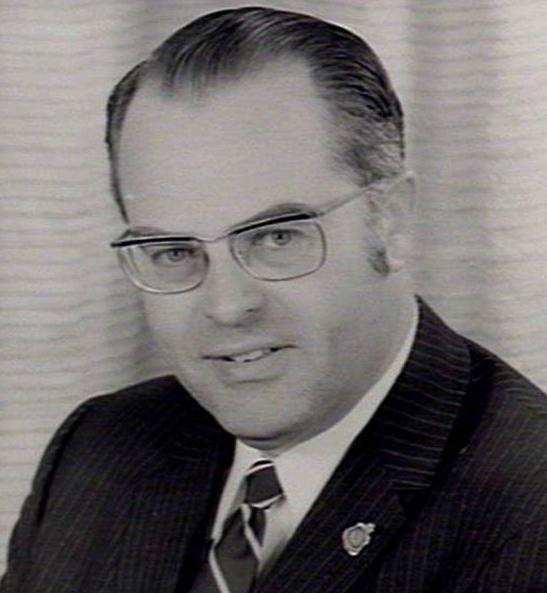
- Willis c. 1965

34th Premier of New South Wales
- In office 23 January 1976 – 14 May 1976
- Monarch: Elizabeth II
- Governor: Sir Roden Cutler
- Deputy: Leon Punch
- Preceded by: Tom Lewis
- Succeeded by: Neville Wran

Minister for Education
- In office 19 June 1972 – 23 January 1976
- Premier: Robert Askin; Tom Lewis
- Preceded by: Sir Charles Cutler
- Succeeded by: Neil Pickard

24th Leader of the Opposition of New South Wales
- In office 14 May 1976 – 16 December 1977
- Deputy: John Maddison
- Preceded by: Neville Wran
- Succeeded by: Peter Coleman

Member of the New South Wales Parliament for Earlwood
- In office 17 June 1950 – 16 June 1978
- Preceded by: New district
- Succeeded by: Ken Gabb

Personal details
- Born: 15 January 1922 Murwillumbah, New South Wales, Australia
- Died: 10 May 1999 (aged 77) Sydney, New South Wales
- Party: Liberal Party
- Relations: Max Willis
- Awards: Knight Commander of the Order of the British Empire; Companion of the Order of St Michael and St George

Military service
- Allegiance: Australia
- Branch/service: Australian Army
- Years of service: 1941–1958
- Rank: Major
- Unit: Intelligence Corps; Citizen Military Forces
- Battles/wars: World War II; New Guinea campaign; Philippines campaign; Korean War

Sir Eric Archibald Willis (15 January 1922 – 10 May 1999) was the 34th Premier of New South Wales, serving from 23 January 1976 to 14 May 1976. Born in Murwillumbah in 1922, Willis was educated at Murwillumbah High School and the University of Sydney, where he obtained a Bachelor of Arts with double honours. Enlisting during World War II, Willis served on the homefront and later served in New Guinea and the Philippines. He continued to serve the Citizen Military Forces until 1958.

After serving a period as a geographer, Willis was elected to the New South Wales Legislative Assembly as the Liberal member for Earlwood in 1950. He rose to become a long-serving Deputy Leader of the Liberal Party from 1959 to 1975 under Robert Askin. When the Coalition won the 1965 election, Willis was made a Minister of the Crown as Chief Secretary, Minister for Labour and Industry, Tourism and Sport but rose to prominence in his role as Minister for Education from 1972 to 1976. When Askin retired in 1975, Willis failed in his attempts to succeed him.

Following the ousting of Askin's successor, Tom Lewis, by the party, Willis was elected as the Parliamentary Leader of the Liberal Party and subsequently became Premier. However, after only four months in office, his Liberal/National Country Party Coalition was defeated at the 1976 election by the Labor Party under Neville Wran. Continuing as Leader of the Opposition, Willis resigned in 1977 and retired from politics a year later. Thereafter he served in various organisations and directorships until his death in May 1999.

== Early life ==
Willis was born in January 1922 in Murwillumbah, the first son of Archibald Clarence Willis (1893–1975), a butter factory hand and First World War veteran, and his wife, Vida Mabel Buttenshaw (1894–1984). His younger brother was NSW Legislative Council Member and President, Max Willis. He was educated at Tyalgum Public School and then at Murwillumbah High School, at which he was Dux of his year and won a scholarship to study arts at the University of Sydney.

He received a Bachelor of Arts with double honours in Modern History and Geography (BA (Hons)) from Sydney University in 1942. He served in the Second Australian Imperial Force from 1941 to 1946 in Army Intelligence in New Guinea and Philippines during World War II ending the war with the rank of Sergeant. He remained in the military after demobilization, being discharged from the regular military on 3 June 1946. He continued to serve in the Citizen Military Forces (CMF) from 1946, achieving the rank of major in 1948, until retiring in 1958. He married Norma Dorothy Thompson on 11 May 1951 and they had a daughter and two sons. Willis was employed as a senior geographer and investigation officer for Cumberland County Council

== Political career ==
Willis on his election as Deputy Leader in July 1959.

Willis joined the newly formed Liberal Party of Australia in 1945, after hearing a speech by Sir Robert Menzies. He sought preselection for the federal seat of Evans in the 1949 federal election but was defeated in favour of Frederick Osborne. Instead, he gained preselection for and contested the Labor seat of Lang and gained 45.3 per cent of the vote but was defeated by the sitting member, Dan Mulcahy.

At the June 1950 state election, at the age of 28, Willis was elected to the newly created Legislative Assembly seat of Earlwood, in the inner southwestern suburbs of Sydney, becoming the youngest Member of Parliament. He gained the seat with 55.53% against a single Labor candidate. He soon gained a reputation as rebel in the House, always attacking the Labor Speakers, and consequently being expelled from the house more than any other member. At the February 1953 election, Willis narrowly retained his seat with 50.33%, but at the following 1956 election, he increased his margin to 58.04%.

During his time as member for Earlwood, Willis catered to the changing demographics of his electorate by creating the first-ever Greek branch of the Liberal Party and formed the first Young Liberals branch in Australia, which counted among its recruits future Prime Minister John Howard (1996–2007). Following the 1959 election, at which Willis retained his seat with 58.43%, the Liberal leadership was vacated by Pat Morton. Willis declined to run for the leadership and Deputy Leader Robert Askin was made Leader. Willis then ran unopposed and subsequently became Deputy Leader. At the March 1962 election, despite losing the election, Willis went on to retain his seat for a fifth time with 57.26%.

=== Minister of the Crown ===
In 1965, the May general election ended 24 years of Labor government and began Willis's ministerial career, which spanned the entire length of the Coalition Government. After retaining his seat again with 59.95%, he was appointed to the post of Chief Secretary and Minister for Tourism by Premier Askin in May 1965 to June 1972. Willis was appointed Minister for Labour and Industry from 1965 to March 1971 and during that same time he was also Minister for Sport. From June 1972 to January 1976 he was Minister for Education, where he presided over a huge expansion of schools, teachers and ancillary staff. Willis served as a Fellow of University of Sydney Senate in 1972. Willis was regarded as the outstanding minister of the Askin Government and is considered one of the state's greatest Education Ministers. For his service as Minister, Willis was appointed a Companion of the Order of St Michael and St George on 15 June 1974.

=== Premier ===
Upon Askin's retirement in January 1975, Willis was seen as the favourite to take the premiership. However, despite Askin's initial support, Willis refused his help, preferring to gain the leadership on his own merits. Askin then put his support behind the Minister for Lands, Tom Lewis. Willis, sure he had support, refused to campaign, and the party put its support behind Lewis, leading to his election to Premier. Willis was then replaced as Deputy by John Maddison. For his service as Deputy Leader he was appointed a Knight Commander of the Order of the British Empire (KBE) on 14 June 1975. Lewis was Premier for only one year and looked increasingly likely to lead the state Liberals to defeat. At the party room meeting on 20 January 1976, parliamentary backbencher Neil Pickard called a spill motion which carried 22 votes to 11. Lewis opted not to contest the ensuing leadership ballot, leaving Willis to take the leadership unopposed. Willis was then duly sworn in as Premier on 23 January, alongside his reconfigured Cabinet, by the Lieutenant Governor of New South Wales, Sir Laurence Street.

In his brief time as Premier he extensively reshuffled the cabinet, dropping five ministers in an attempt to distance himself from the past, including Steve Mauger and John Mason, and appointed new cabinet faces such as Pickard and David Arblaster. His most significant decision was to set up in April 1976 the long-demanded inquiry into the prison system in the form of a Royal Commission under Justice Nagle. Willis also introduced Daylight Saving time, to be decided upon in a referendum, scrapped the unpopular petrol tax and announced a masterplan for Sydney's transport system.

When former Minister Steve Mauger resigned on 27 January 1976, sparking a by-election in his seat of Monaro in May, and early polls had indicated a large swing to Labor, Willis announced an early election on 1 May, thereby cancelling the by-election in the hope of preventing a larger move of voters against the government. In the May 1976 election, Willis's government lost power to the Labor Party under Neville Wran. The election was notable for being very close run; with the seats of Gosford and Hurstville being lost by only 74 and 44 votes respectively. Had Willis retained those seats he would have remained in government. At that same election Daylight Saving time for New South Wales was passed by 68.4 per cent for and 31.6 per cent against and whenever Willis was asked what his greatest achievement as Premier was, he would always say "Daylight Saving".

Willis (4th left, front row) with his Cabinet, following their swearing in, at Government House on 23 January 1976.

==== The Willis-Punch Cabinet ====
- Sir Eric Willis, Premier and Treasurer
- Leon Punch, Deputy Premier, Minister for Public Works, Minister for Ports (CP)
- John Maddison, Attorney General, Minister for Justice
- Tim Bruxner, Minister for Transport, Minister for Highways (CP)
- Neil Pickard, Minister for Education
- Dick Healey, Minister for Health
- Bruce Cowan, Minister for Agriculture, Minister for Water Resources (CP)
- Peter Coleman, Chief Secretary
- Tom Lewis, Minister for Local Government
- George Freudenstein, Minister for Mines, Minister for Energy (CP)
- Sir John Fuller MLC, Minister for Planning and Environment, vice-president of the Executive Council (CP)
- Max Ruddock, Assistant Treasurer, Minister for Revenue
- Frederick Hewitt MLC, Minister for Labour and Industry, Minister for Federal Affairs, Minister for Consumer Affairs
- Ian Griffith, Minister for Housing, Minister for Co-operative Societies
- David Arblaster, Minister for Culture, Sport and Recreation, Minister for Tourism
- Milton Morris, Minister for Decentralisation and Development
- Col Fisher, Minister for Lands, Minister for Forests (CP)
- Jim Clough, Minister for Youth, Ethnic and Community Affairs

== Later life ==
=== Opposition ===
After the election he retained the Liberal leadership but proved to be less than suited for opposition. On 19 January 1977, the Granville rail disaster claimed the lives of 83 people—the worst rail disaster in Australian history at the time. In response to this, Willis declared that there had never been as many deaths on the railways during the Liberal Government. The insensitive remark led several Liberal MLAs to introduce a no-confidence motion in Willis' leadership. While Willis survived the motion, speculation about a leadership challenge continued for the rest of his term. On 15 December four party MPs declared that they would oppose him in a leadership ballot the next day. On 15 December 1977, Willis called a press conference to announce his intention to resign as leader:

"In 27 years in parliamentary life I have won many times and I have lost many times. I have experienced the pleasures of success and the frustrations of failures on a number of occasions...I leave the position of Leader of the Oppostition with no bitterness but naturally with a great amount of sadness"

— Sir Eric Willis, 16 December 1977

On 16 December, he formally resigned as leader at the party meeting and was replaced by Peter Coleman. Willis resigned as Member for Earlwood on 16 June 1978, at the age of 56. At the resulting by-election, Earlwood fell to the Labor candidate, Ken Gabb.

=== After politics ===
On his retirement, he was permitted by Queen Elizabeth II, on the Governor's recommendation, to continue to use the title "The Honourable" for life. As a member of parliament he received the Queen Elizabeth II Coronation Medal (1953), and the Queen Elizabeth II Silver Jubilee Medal (1977). After retiring from politics Willis held positions with the Royal Australian College of Ophthalmologists and the Arthritis Foundation, of which he was executive director from 1984 to 1991. Willis also spent time as vice-president of the Red Cross (NSW Branch) and was a Fellow of the Royal Society of St George, a Member of the Australian Institute of Political Science and the Australian Institute of International Affairs. Willis left his residence in Bardwell Park and moved to Neutral Bay, where his marriage collapsed.

He divorced his first wife, Norma, and remarried to Lynn. He died in Sydney on 10 May 1999.

New South Wales Legislative Assembly
New district	Member for Earlwood; 1950–1978	Succeeded by Ken Gabb
Party political offices
Preceded by Sir Robert Askin	Deputy Leader of the New South Wales Liberal Party; 1959–1975	Succeeded by John Maddison
Preceded by Tom Lewis	Leader of the New South Wales Liberal Party; 1976–1977	Succeeded by Peter Coleman
Political offices
Preceded by Jim Maloney	Minister for Labour and Industry; 1965–1971	Succeeded by Frederick Hewitt
Preceded by Gus Kelly	Chief Secretary of New South Wales; 1965–1972	Succeeded by Ian Griffith
Preceded by Gus Kelly	Minister for Tourist Activities; 1965–1968	Succeeded by Himself as Minister for Tourism
Preceded by Himself as Minister for Tourist Activities	Minister for Tourism; 1968–1971	Succeeded by Himself as Minister for Tourism and Sport
Preceded by Himself as Minister for Tourism	Minister for Tourism and Sport; 1971–1972	Succeeded by Tom Lewis as Minister for Tourism
Preceded by Himself as Minister for Tourism	Minister for Tourism and Sport; 1971–1972	Succeeded by John Barraclough as Minister for Culture, Sport and Recreation
Preceded by Sir Charles Cutler	Minister for Education; 1972–1976	Succeeded by Neil Pickard
Preceded by Tom Lewis	Premier of New South Wales; 1976	Succeeded by Neville Wran
Preceded by Tom Lewis	Treasurer of New South Wales; 1976	Succeeded by Jack Renshaw
Preceded by Neville Wran	Leader of the Opposition of New South Wales; 1976–1977	Succeeded by Peter Coleman
