= Harry Jensen =

Australian politician (1913–1998)

The Honourable Harry Jensen AO

71st Lord Mayor of Sydney
- In office 1 December 1956 – 3 December 1965
- Preceded by: Pat Hills
- Succeeded by: John Armstrong

Personal details
- Born: 12 July 1913 Newtown, New South Wales, Australia
- Died: 27 August 1998 (aged 85) Randwick, New South Wales, Australia
- Party: Labor Party

Henry Frederick Jensen AO, (12 July 1913 – 27 August 1998) was an Australian ALP politician, who served as a member of the New South Wales Legislative Assembly from 1965 until 1981. He was also Lord Mayor of Sydney from 1957 until 1965.

Born in Newtown, New South Wales, Jensen was educated at Gardiners Road Public School, Marist Brothers High School in Darlinghurst, and St. Joseph's College, Hunters Hill. He joined the Labor Party in 1929. He worked as an electrician and became an organiser within the Australian Electrical Trades Union and a delegate to the Australian Trades and Labor Council. He subsequently established his own electrical contracting business and later worked in footwear distribution.

He served as an alderman on Randwick Municipal Council from 1950 until 1956, including Mayor of Randwick from 1954. He was an alderman on Sydney City Council from 1956 until 1965, and Lord Mayor of Sydney from 1957 until 1965.

He entered the New South Wales Legislative Assembly at the 1965 state election, as member for Wyong, which he represented until October 1973. He was re-elected in November 1973 as the representative for Munmorah, a seat he occupied until 28 August 1981.

From 1976 until 1981, Jensen held various ministerial positions in the cabinet of Premier Neville Wran. He died in Randwick, New South Wales.

Civic offices
Preceded by Matthew Dwyer	Mayor of Randwick; 1954	Succeeded by Lionel Bowen
Preceded by Pat Hills	Lord Mayor of Sydney; 1956–1965	Succeeded by John Armstrong
Government offices
Preceded by Reginald Arthur Triggs	Chairman of the Sydney County Council; 1954–1955	Succeeded by Ernest Charles O'Dea
New South Wales Legislative Assembly
Preceded by Ray Maher	Member for Wyong; 1965–1973	District abolished
New district	Member for Munmorah; 1973–1981	District abolished
Political offices
Preceded by Tom Lewis	Minister for Local Government; 1976–1981	Succeeded by Lin Gordon
Preceded by Sir John Fuller as Minister for Planning and Environment	Minister for Planning; 1976	Succeeded by Paul Landa as Minister for Planning and Environment
Preceded by Peter Cox as Minister for Highways	Minister for Roads; 1978–1981	Succeeded by Paul Whelan
