= Electoral results for the district of Gosford =

Election results for Gosford, New South Wales, Australia

Gosford, an electoral district of the Legislative Assembly in the Australian state of New South Wales, has existed from 1950 to the present.

== Members for Gosford ==
Election	Member	Party
1950	Harold Jackson	Liberal
1953	Harold Jackson	Liberal
1956	Harold Jackson	Liberal
1959	Harold Jackson	Liberal
1962	Harold Jackson	Liberal
1965	Ted Humphries	Liberal
1968	Ted Humphries	Liberal
1971	Keith O'Connell	Labor
1973	Malcolm Brooks	Liberal
1976	Brian McGowan	Labor
1978	Brian McGowan	Labor
1981	Brian McGowan	Labor
1984	Brian McGowan	Labor
1988	Chris Hartcher	Liberal
1991	Chris Hartcher	Liberal
1995	Chris Hartcher	Liberal
1999	Chris Hartcher	Liberal
2003	Chris Hartcher	Liberal
2007	Marie Andrews	Labor
2011	Chris Holstein	Liberal
2015	Kathy Smith	Labor
2017 by	Liesl Tesch	Labor
2019	Liesl Tesch	Labor
2023	Liesl Tesch	Labor

== Election results ==
=== Elections in the 2020s ===
==== 2023 ====
2023 New South Wales state election: Gosford
Party	Candidate	Votes	%	±%
Labor	Liesl Tesch	24,703	50.4	+6.3
Liberal	Dee Bocking	13,881	28.3	−7.8
Greens	Hilary van Haren	4,553	9.3	+0.2
Shooters, Fishers, Farmers	Larry Freeman	2,071	4.2	−0.5
Independent	Lisa Bellamy	1,668	3.4	+3.4
Animal Justice	Emily McCallum	1,336	2.7	−0.7
Sustainable Australia	Ineka Soetens	806	1.6	−0.8
Total formal votes		49,018	97.0	+0.5
Informal votes		1,524	3.0	−0.5
Turnout		50,542	86.9	−2.0
Two-party-preferred result
Labor	Liesl Tesch	29,023	65.4	+8.3
Liberal	Dee Bocking	15,364	34.6	−8.3
Labor hold		Swing	+8.3	

=== Elections in the 2010s ===
==== 2019 ====
2019 New South Wales state election: Gosford
Party	Candidate	Votes	%	±%
Labor	Liesl Tesch	21,505	44.22	+5.56
Liberal	Susan Dengate	17,529	36.04	−6.51
Greens	Hillary Morris	4,405	9.06	+0.05
Shooters, Fishers, Farmers	Larry Freeman	2,307	4.74	+4.74
Animal Justice	Patrick Murphy	1,678	3.45	+3.45
Sustainable Australia	Judy Singer	1,213	2.49	+2.49
Total formal votes		48,637	96.45	−0.39
Informal votes		1,788	3.55	+0.39
Turnout		50,425	89.35	−1.26
Two-party-preferred result
Labor	Liesl Tesch	25,048	57.27	+7.04
Liberal	Susan Dengate	18,691	42.73	−7.04
Labor hold		Swing	+7.04	

==== 2017 by-election ====
2017 Gosford by-election Saturday 8 April
Party	Candidate	Votes	%	±%
Labor	Liesl Tesch	22,931	49.5	+10.9
Liberal	Jilly Pilon	14,208	30.7	−11.9
Greens	Abigail Boyd	3,454	7.5	−1.5
Shooters, Fishers, Farmers	Larry Freeman	2,378	5.1	+5.1
Animal Justice	Skyla Wagstaff	1,841	4.0	+4.0
Christian Democrats	Andrew Church	1,475	3.2	+0.9
Total formal votes		46,287	97.3	+0.5
Informal votes		1,285	2.7	−0.5
Turnout		47,572	85.0	−5.6
Two-party-preferred result
Labor	Liesl Tesch	26,440	62.5	+12.3
Liberal	Jilly Pilon	15,853	37.5	−12.3
Labor hold		Swing	+12.3	

Kathy Smith (Labor) resigned.

==== 2015 ====
2015 New South Wales state election: Gosford
Party	Candidate	Votes	%	±%
Liberal	Chris Holstein	20,535	42.5	−7.6
Labor	Kathy Smith	18,654	38.7	+11.0
Greens	Kate Da Costa	4,346	9.0	−2.9
Independent	Jake Cassar	2,698	5.6	+5.6
Christian Democrats	Andrew Church	1,091	2.3	−1.2
No Land Tax	Matthew Maroney	938	1.9	+1.9
Total formal votes		48,262	96.8	+0.9
Informal votes		1,573	3.2	−0.9
Turnout		49,835	90.6	−0.3
Two-party-preferred result
Labor	Kathy Smith	22,029	50.2	+12.2
Liberal	Chris Holstein	21,826	49.8	−12.2
Labor gain from Liberal		Swing	+12.2	

==== 2011 ====
2011 New South Wales state election: Gosford
Party	Candidate	Votes	%	±%
Liberal	Chris Holstein	22,672	50.2	+15.4
Labor	Katie Smith	12,472	27.6	−15.1
Greens	Peter Freewater	5,391	11.9	+5.0
Independent	Jake Cassar	2,227	4.9	+4.9
Christian Democrats	Ann-Marie Kitchener	1,478	3.3	+0.4
Independent	Patrick Aiken	935	2.1	+2.1
Total formal votes		45,175	96.6	−0.7
Informal votes		1,573	3.4	+0.7
Turnout		46,748	93.2	+0.2
Two-party-preferred result
Liberal	Chris Holstein	24,425	61.9	+16.7
Labor	Katie Smith	15,052	38.1	−16.7
Liberal gain from Labor		Swing	+16.7	

=== Elections in the 2000s ===
==== 2007 ====
2007 New South Wales state election: Gosford
Party	Candidate	Votes	%	±%
Labor	Marie Andrews	18,448	42.7	−2.8
Liberal	Chris Holstein	15,057	34.8	+3.3
Independent	Debra Wales	3,852	8.9	+8.9
Greens	Hillary Morris	2,977	6.9	+1.6
Christian Democrats	George Grant	1,241	2.9	+2.9
Against Further Immigration	Robert Moulds	1,141	2.6	+1.4
Save Our Suburbs	Bryan Ellis	524	1.2	+0.9
Total formal votes		43,240	97.4	−0.4
Informal votes		1,165	2.6	+0.4
Turnout		44,405	93.4	
Two-party-preferred result
Labor	Marie Andrews	20,535	54.9	−3.7
Liberal	Chris Holstein	16,900	45.1	+3.7
Labor notional hold		Swing	−3.7	

==== 2003 ====
2003 New South Wales state election: Gosford
Party	Candidate	Votes	%	±%
Liberal	Chris Hartcher	20,477	46.3	+2.9
Labor	Deborah O'Neill	19,098	43.1	+3.0
Greens	Mark Dickinson	3,146	7.1	+4.3
Save Our Suburbs	Ian Lamont	716	1.6	+1.6
Democrats	Allison Newman	602	1.4	−2.0
Unity	Yieu Mak	234	0.5	+0.5
Total formal votes		44,273	98.1	+0.0
Informal votes		875	1.9	−0.0
Turnout		45,148	92.3	
Two-party-preferred result
Liberal	Chris Hartcher	21,015	50.3	−2.0
Labor	Deborah O'Neill	20,743	49.7	+2.0
Liberal hold		Swing	−2.0	

=== Elections in the 1990s ===
==== 1999 ====
1999 New South Wales state election: Gosford
Party	Candidate	Votes	%	±%
Liberal	Chris Hartcher	18,136	43.4	−8.8
Labor	Barry Cohen	16,720	40.1	−0.1
One Nation	Errol Baker	2,172	5.2	+5.2
Democrats	Andrew Penfold	1,413	3.4	−0.4
Greens	Joanna Weckert	1,159	2.8	+2.8
Christian Democrats	Gary Bailey	1,104	2.6	+2.6
Earthsave	Anna Parker	475	1.1	+1.1
Against Further Immigration	Isabel Gelling	288	0.7	+0.7
Independent	Tom McKenna	275	0.7	+0.7
Total formal votes		41,742	98.1	+1.5
Informal votes		824	1.9	−1.5
Turnout		42,566	92.6	
Two-party-preferred result
Liberal	Chris Hartcher	19,984	52.3	−3.2
Labor	Barry Cohen	18,262	47.7	+3.2
Liberal hold		Swing	−3.2	

==== 1995 ====
1995 New South Wales state election: Gosford
Party	Candidate	Votes	%	±%
Liberal	Chris Hartcher	19,293	52.2	+3.3
Labor	Tony Sansom	14,841	40.2	+8.0
Independent	James Adams	1,423	3.9	+3.9
Democrats	Andrew Penfold	1,399	3.8	−0.9
Total formal votes		36,956	96.5	+2.4
Informal votes		1,330	3.5	−2.4
Turnout		38,286	94.7	
Two-party-preferred result
Liberal	Chris Hartcher	20,117	55.5	−1.3
Labor	Tony Sansom	16,153	44.5	+1.3
Liberal hold		Swing	−1.3	

==== 1991 ====
1991 New South Wales state election: Gosford
Party	Candidate	Votes	%	±%
Liberal	Chris Hartcher	15,328	48.9	−0.9
Labor	Stephen Goodwin	10,078	32.1	−4.5
Independent	Robert Bell	3,817	12.2	+12.2
Democrats	Andrew Penfold	1,464	4.7	−0.9
Call to Australia	Eric Trezise	677	2.2	−5.9
Total formal votes		31,364	94.1	−3.1
Informal votes		1,949	5.9	+3.1
Turnout		33,313	93.9	
Two-party-preferred result
Liberal	Chris Hartcher	16,940	56.7	−0.7
Labor	Stephen Goodwin	12,915	43.3	+0.7
Liberal hold		Swing	−0.7	

=== Elections in the 1980s ===
==== 1988 ====
1988 New South Wales state election: Gosford
Party	Candidate	Votes	%	±%
Liberal	Chris Hartcher	16,589	50.2	+19.8
Labor	Anthony Sansom	11,922	36.1	−9.5
Call to Australia	John Anderson	2,690	8.1	+8.1
Democrats	Gary Chestnut	1,845	5.6	0.0
Total formal votes		33,046	97.2	−1.2
Informal votes		938	2.8	+1.2
Turnout		33,984	95.1	
Two-party-preferred result
Liberal	Chris Hartcher	18,507	57.8	+8.7
Labor	Anthony Sansom	13,485	42.2	−8.7
Liberal gain from Labor		Swing	+8.7	

==== 1984 ====
1984 New South Wales state election: Gosford
Party	Candidate	Votes	%	±%
Labor	Brian McGowan	17,438	46.5	−5.0
Liberal	Chris Hartcher	11,323	30.2	−10.3
National	Donald Leggett	6,548	17.5	+17.5
Democrats	Gary Chestnut	2,168	5.8	+1.3
Total formal votes		37,477	98.4	+0.7
Informal votes		615	1.6	−0.7
Turnout		38,092	93.6	+1.4
Two-party-preferred result
Labor	Brian McGowan	19,147	51.9	−4.9
Liberal	Chris Hartcher	17,734	48.1	+4.9
Labor hold		Swing	−4.9	

==== 1981 ====
1981 New South Wales state election: Gosford
Party	Candidate	Votes	%	±%
Labor	Brian McGowan	17,066	51.5	−5.9
Liberal	Andrew Fennell	13,419	40.5	+3.2
Democrats	Robert Bell	1,474	4.5	−0.4
Independent	Barry Phillips	639	1.9	+1.9
Independent	Paul Baker	522	1.6	+1.6
Total formal votes		33,120	97.7	
Informal votes		787	2.3	
Turnout		33,907	92.2	
Two-party-preferred result
Labor	Brian McGowan	18,066	56.8	−2.8
Liberal	Andrew Fennell	13,719	43.2	+2.8
Labor hold		Swing	−2.8	

=== Elections in the 1970s ===
==== 1978 ====
1978 New South Wales state election: Gosford
Party	Candidate	Votes	%	±%
Labor	Brian McGowan	19,282	57.4	+9.1
Liberal	Andrew Fennell	12,539	37.3	−11.6
Democrats	John Cleverly	1,636	4.9	+4.9
Independent	Stanley Williams	128	0.4	+0.4
Total formal votes		33,585	98.9	0.0
Informal votes		384	1.1	0.0
Turnout		33,969	94.2	−0.5
Two-party-preferred result
Labor	Brian McGowan	20,001	59.6	+9.5
Liberal	Andrew Fennell	13,584	40.4	−9.5
Labor hold		Swing	+9.5	

==== 1976 ====
1976 New South Wales state election: Gosford
Party	Candidate	Votes	%	±%
Liberal	Malcolm Brooks	14,534	48.9	−3.8
Labor	Brian McGowan	14,347	48.3	+4.7
Australia	Barry Phillips	855	2.9	+2.9
Total formal votes		29,736	98.9	+0.6
Informal votes		329	1.1	−0.6
Turnout		30,065	94.7	+1.2
Two-party-preferred result
Labor	Brian McGowan	14,905	50.1	+5.8
Liberal	Malcolm Brooks	14,831	49.9	−5.8
Labor gain from Liberal		Swing	+5.8	

==== 1973 ====
1973 New South Wales state election: Gosford
Party	Candidate	Votes	%	±%
Liberal	Malcolm Brooks	12,307	52.7	+6.6
Labor	Brian McGowan	10,182	43.6	−4.3
Democratic Labor	William Dunbar	873	3.7	+3.7
Total formal votes		23,362	98.3	
Informal votes		396	1.7	
Turnout		23,758	93.5	
Two-party-preferred result
Liberal	Malcolm Brooks	13,005	55.7	+4.6
Labor	Brian McGowan	10,357	44.3	−4.6
Liberal notional hold		Swing	+4.6	

The sitting member was Keith O'Connell (Labor) however the 1973 redistribution made Gosford a notional Liberal seat and O'Connell successfully contested the new seat of Peats.

==== 1971 ====
1971 New South Wales state election: Gosford
Party	Candidate	Votes	%	±%
Labor	Keith O'Connell	15,105	48.9	+1.0
Liberal	Ted Humphries	13,926	45.1	−3.6
Independent	Wallace Cook	944	3.1	+3.1
Australia	Barry Phillips	903	2.9	+2.9
Total formal votes		30,878	98.9	
Informal votes		352	1.1	
Turnout		31,230	94.8	
Two-party-preferred result
Labor	Keith O'Connell	16,233	52.6	+4.0
Liberal	Ted Humphries	14,645	47.4	−4.0
Labor gain from Liberal		Swing	+4.0	

=== Elections in the 1960s ===
==== 1968 ====
1968 New South Wales state election: Gosford
Party	Candidate	Votes	%	±%
Liberal	Ted Humphries	11,623	48.7	+1.5
Labor	Peter Westerway	11,438	47.9	+2.8
Democratic Labor	Thomas Crass	813	3.4	−4.3
Total formal votes		23,874	98.2	
Informal votes		446	1.8	
Turnout		24,320	96.1	
Two-party-preferred result
Liberal	Ted Humphries	12,271	51.4	+1.0
Labor	Peter Westerway	11,603	48.6	−1.0
Liberal hold		Swing	+1.0	

==== 1965 ====
1965 New South Wales state election: Gosford
Party	Candidate	Votes	%	±%
Liberal	Ted Humphries	11,533	48.2	−2.5
Labor	Kevin Dwyer	10,543	44.1	−5.2
Democratic Labor	Michael Dwyer	1,839	7.7	+7.7
Total formal votes		23,915	98.5	−0.3
Informal votes		358	1.5	+0.3
Turnout		24,273	95.0	−0.1
Two-party-preferred result
Liberal	Ted Humphries	12,336	51.6	+0.9
Labor	Kevin Dwyer	11,579	48.4	−0.9
Liberal hold		Swing	+0.9	

==== 1962 ====
1962 New South Wales state election: Gosford
Party	Candidate	Votes	%	±%
Liberal	Harold Jackson	10,473	50.7	−6.7
Labor	Kevin Dwyer	10,170	49.3	+6.7
Total formal votes		20,643	98.8	
Informal votes		241	1.2	
Turnout		20,884	95.1	
Liberal hold		Swing	−6.7	

=== Elections in the 1950s ===
==== 1959 ====
1959 New South Wales state election: Gosford
Party	Candidate	Votes	%	±%
Liberal	Harold Jackson	11,999	60.8	
Labor	Reginald Smith	7,746	39.2	
Total formal votes		19,745	98.7	
Informal votes		268	1.3	
Turnout		20,013	93.9	
Liberal hold		Swing		

==== 1956 ====
1956 New South Wales state election: Gosford
Party	Candidate	Votes	%	±%
Liberal	Harold Jackson	11,096	56.8	+2.8
Labor	Rupert Wallace	7,164	36.7	−9.3
Communist	Alan Brackenreg	626	3.2	+3.2
Independent	Roy Jackson	463	2.4	+2.4
Independent	Leslie Moffat	174	0.9	+0.9
Total formal votes		19,523	98.2	+0.2
Informal votes		356	1.8	−0.2
Turnout		19,879	93.4	+0.2
Two-party-preferred result
Liberal	Harold Jackson	11,478	58.7	+4.7
Labor	Rupert Wallace	8,045	41.3	−4.7
Liberal hold		Swing	+4.7	

==== 1953 ====
1953 New South Wales state election: Gosford
Party	Candidate	Votes	%	±%
Liberal	Harold Jackson	9,576	54.0	
Labor	Rupert Wallace	8,160	46.0	
Total formal votes		17,736	98.0	
Informal votes		359	2.0	
Turnout		18,095	93.2	
Liberal hold		Swing		

==== 1950 ====
1950 New South Wales state election: Gosford
Party	Candidate	Votes	%	±%
Liberal	Harold Jackson	5,800	38.6	
Labor	John Egan	4,631	30.9	
Independent	Jack Parks	1,972	13.1	
Independent	George Downes	1,133	7.6	
Independent	Walter Lloyd	866	5.8	
Country	William Wright	606	4.0	
Total formal votes		15,008	97.6	
Informal votes		374	2.4	
Turnout		15,382	92.3	
Two-party-preferred result
Liberal	Harold Jackson	9,254	61.7	
Labor	John Egan	5,754	38.3	
Liberal notional hold				
