= Results of the 1973 New South Wales state election (Legislative Assembly) =

State election for New South Wales, Australia in November 1973

New South Wales state election, 17 November 1973 Legislative Assembly << 1971–1976 >>
Enrolled voters	2,767,876 (Note: There were 2,788,733 enrolled voters but 20,857 were enrolled in Broken Hill (Labor) which was uncontested at the election.)				
Votes cast	2,560,653		Turnout	92.51	-0.75
Informal votes	69,225		Informal	2.70	+0.36
Summary of votes by party
Party	Primary votes	%	Swing	Seats	Change
Labor	1,069,614	42.93	–2.09	44	– 1
Liberal	843,325	33.85	–1.89	34	+ 2
Country	261,504	10.48	+1.83	18	+ 1
Democratic Labor	148,378	5.96	+2.79	1	+ 1
Australia	104,821	4.21	+3.15	0	± 0
Communist	838	0.03	–0.06	0	± 0
Independent	63,358	2.54	–3.24	2	± 0
Total	2,491,428			99	

This is a list of electoral district results for the 1973 New South Wales state election.

== Results by Electoral district ==
=== Albury ===
1973 New South Wales state election: Albury
Party	Candidate	Votes	%	±%
Liberal	Gordon Mackie	11,948	56.7	+5.3
Labor	Gordon Mitchell	7,375	35.0	−2.8
Democratic Labor	Anthony Quinn	1,761	8.3	−2.5
Total formal votes		21,084	98.3	
Informal votes		361	1.7	
Turnout		21,445	92.9	
Two-party-preferred result
Liberal	Gordon Mackie	13,357	63.4	+3.4
Labor	Gordon Mitchell	7,727	36.6	−3.4
Liberal hold		Swing	+3.4	

=== Armidale ===
1973 New South Wales state election: Armidale
Party	Candidate	Votes	%	±%
Country	David Leitch	13,296	59.7	−2.2
Labor	Judith Waters	8,053	36.2	−1.9
Democratic Labor	Peter McRae	922	4.1	+4.1
Total formal votes		22,271	98.7	
Informal votes		285	1.3	
Turnout		22,556	94.4	
Two-party-preferred result
Country	David Leitch	14,033	63.0	+1.1
Labor	Judith Waters	8,238	37.0	−1.1
Country hold		Swing	+1.1	

=== Ashfield ===
1973 New South Wales state election: Ashfield
Party	Candidate	Votes	%	±%
Liberal	David Hunter	13,077	47.4	+2.5
Labor	Bede Spillane	11,625	42.1	−1.4
Australia	John Jordan	1,531	5.6	+0.1
Democratic Labor	Mary Burton	1,377	5.0	−1.1
Total formal votes		27,610	96.5	
Informal votes		993	3.5	
Turnout		28,603	90.7	
Two-party-preferred result
Liberal	David Hunter	14,810	53.6	+1.5
Labor	Bede Spillane	12,800	46.4	−1.5
Liberal hold		Swing	+1.5	

=== Auburn ===
1973 New South Wales state election: Auburn
Party	Candidate	Votes	%	±%
Labor	Peter Cox	19,371	62.8	−4.9
Liberal	Arthur Deane	9,480	30.8	−1.5
Democratic Labor	Christopher Carroll	1,979	6.4	+6.4
Total formal votes		30,830	97.0	
Informal votes		960	3.0	
Turnout		31,790	93.7	
Two-party-preferred result
Labor	Peter Cox	19,767	64.1	−3.6
Liberal	Arthur Deane	11,063	35.9	+3.6
Labor hold		Swing	−3.6	

=== Balmain ===
1973 New South Wales state election: Balmain
Party	Candidate	Votes	%	±%
Labor	Roger Degen	18,013	69.2	−3.8
Democratic Labor	Gary Doherty	4,196	16.1	+16.1
Australia	Rosemary Smith	3,839	14.7	+14.7
Total formal votes		26,048	94.6	
Informal votes		1,476	5.4	
Turnout		27,524	89.5	
Two-candidate-preferred result
Labor	Roger Degen	19,933	76.5	+3.5
Democratic Labor	Gary Doherty	6,115	23.5	+23.5
Labor hold		Swing	N/A	

=== Bankstown ===
1973 New South Wales state election: Bankstown
Party	Candidate	Votes	%	±%
Labor	Nick Kearns	18,920	62.0	−1.9
Liberal	John Ghent	10,306	33.8	−2.3
Democratic Labor	Joseph Sanders	1,303	4.3	+4.3
Total formal votes		30,529	97.0	
Informal votes		941	3.0	
Turnout		31,470	93.8	
Two-party-preferred result
Labor	Nick Kearns	19,181	62.8	−1.1
Liberal	John Ghent	11,348	37.2	+1.1
Labor hold		Swing	−1.1	

=== Barwon ===
1973 New South Wales state election: Barwon
Party	Candidate	Votes	%	±%
Country	Geoff Crawford	14,020	75.5	+24.8
Australia	Graham Gifford	4,540	24.5	+24.5
Total formal votes		18,560	96.2	
Informal votes		725	3.8	
Turnout		19,285	91.7	
Country hold		Swing	+18.8	

=== Bass Hill ===
1973 New South Wales state election: Bass Hill
Party	Candidate	Votes	%	±%
Labor	Neville Wran	17,413	60.7	−6.1
Liberal	Raymond Clark-Smith	11,277	39.3	+6.1
Total formal votes		28,690	96.4	
Informal votes		1,060	3.6	
Turnout		29,750	94.5	
Labor hold		Swing	−6.1	

=== Bathurst ===
1973 New South Wales state election: Bathurst
Party	Candidate	Votes	%	±%
Country	Clive Osborne	12,659	59.9	+9.2
Labor	Maxwell Hanrahan	7,698	36.5	−8.3
Democratic Labor	John O'Grady	765	3.6	+3.6
Total formal votes		21,122	98.8	
Informal votes		259	1.2	
Turnout		21,381	95.6	
Two-party-preferred result
Country	Clive Osborne	13,271	62.8	+10.9
Labor	Maxwell Hanrahan	7,851	37.2	−10.9
Country hold		Swing	+10.9	

=== Blacktown ===
1973 New South Wales state election: Blacktown
Party	Candidate	Votes	%	±%
Labor	Gordon Barnier	16,272	58.3	−1.1
Liberal	John Lyon	8,935	32.0	+0.6
Democratic Labor	Stan Aster-Stater	1,207	4.3	−1.6
Independent	George Perrin	1,135	4.1	+4.1
Independent	F. Ivor	366	1.3	+1.3
Total formal votes		27,915	95.3	
Informal votes		1,389	4.7	
Turnout		29,304	93.6	
Two-party-preferred result
Labor	Gordon Barnier	17,500	62.7	+0.4
Liberal	John Lyon	10,415	37.3	−0.4
Labor hold		Swing	+0.4	

=== Bligh ===
1973 New South Wales state election: Bligh
Party	Candidate	Votes	%	±%
Liberal	John Barraclough	16,767	66.3	+7.5
Australia	Julia Featherstone	6,656	26.3	+26.3
Democratic Labor	Monica Quigley	1,883	7.4	+4.5
Total formal votes		25,306	95.1	
Informal votes		1,298	4.9	
Turnout		26,604	84.0	
Two-candidate-preferred result
Liberal	John Barraclough	17,709	70.0	+5.9
Australia	Julia Featherstone	7,597	30.0	+30.0
Liberal hold		Swing	+5.9	

=== Blue Mountains ===
1973 New South Wales state election: Blue Mountains
Party	Candidate	Votes	%	±%
Independent	Harold Coates	1,229	54.9	+0.1
Labor	Mick Clough	9,339	41.9	+2.5
Democratic Labor	Joseph Conroy	709	3.2	−0.8
Total formal votes		22,277	98.6	
Informal votes		314	1.4	
Turnout		22,591	94.0	
Two-candidate-preferred result
Independent	Harold Coates	12,584	56.5	−1.2
Labor	Mick Clough	9,693	43.5	+1.2
Independent hold		Swing	−1.2	

=== Broken Hill ===
1973 New South Wales state election: Broken Hill
Party	Candidate	Votes	%	±%
Labor	Lew Johnstone	unopposed		
Labor hold				

=== Burrendong ===
1973 New South Wales state election: Burrendong
Party	Candidate	Votes	%	±%
Country	Roger Wotton	9,373	44.3	−3.9
Labor	Leo Nott	9,051	42.8	−9.0
Liberal	Beryl Bowman	2,721	12.9	+12.9
Total formal votes		21,145	99.0	
Informal votes		214	1.0	
Turnout		21,359	94.4	
Two-party-preferred result
Country	Roger Wotton	11,384	53.8	+5.6
Labor	Leo Nott	9,761	46.2	−5.6
Country gain from Labor		Swing	+5.6	

=== Burrinjuck ===
1973 New South Wales state election: Burrinjuck
Party	Candidate	Votes	%	±%
Labor	Terry Sheahan	9,690	49.0	−9.5
Liberal	Leon Garry	4,079	20.6	+1.9
Country	James Brooks	2,876	14.5	−8.3
Country	Edward O'Connor	2,702	13.6	+13.6
Democratic Labor	John Roche	442	2.2	+2.2
Total formal votes		19,789	98.2	
Informal votes		363	1.8	
Turnout		20,152	95.1	
Two-party-preferred result
Labor	Terry Sheahan	10,300	52.0	−7.8
Country	James Brooks	9,489	48.0	+7.8
Labor hold		Swing	−7.8	

=== Burwood ===
1973 New South Wales state election: Burwood
Party	Candidate	Votes	%	±%
Liberal	John Jackett	14,401	57.2	+5.6
Labor	Phil O'Neill	9,142	36.3	+2.5
Democratic Labor	Agnes Bannon	1,642	6.5	+6.5
Total formal votes		25,185	97.0	
Informal votes		765	3.0	
Turnout		25,950	91.1	
Two-party-preferred result
Liberal	John Jackett	15,715	62.4	−1.4
Labor	Phil O'Neill	9,470	37.6	+1.4
Liberal hold		Swing	−1.4	

=== Byron ===
1973 New South Wales state election: Byron
Party	Candidate	Votes	%	±%
Country	Jack Boyd	12,397	61.8	+7.3
Labor	James Constable	6,589	32.8	−12.7
Australia	Brian Halesworth	1,083	5.4	+5.4
Total formal votes		20,069	98.7	
Informal votes		257	1.3	
Turnout		20,326	92.5	
Two-party-preferred result
Country	Jack Boyd	12,900	64.3	+9.8
Labor	James Constable	7,169	35.7	−9.8
Country hold		Swing	+9.8	

=== Campbelltown ===
1973 New South Wales state election: Campbelltown
Party	Candidate	Votes	%	±%
Labor	Cliff Mallam	14,016	51.7	−6.5
Liberal	John Marsden	11,321	41.8	0.0
Independent	Elizabeth Bye	1,000	3.7	+3.7
Democratic Labor	Francis Bulger	753	2.8	+2.8
Total formal votes		27,090	97.3	
Informal votes		744	2.7	
Turnout		27,834	93.9	
Two-party-preferred result
Labor	Cliff Mallam	15,074	55.6	−2.6
Liberal	John Marsden	12,016	44.4	+2.6
Labor hold		Swing	−2.6	

=== Canterbury ===
1973 New South Wales state election: Canterbury
Party	Candidate	Votes	%	±%
Labor	Kevin Stewart	16,784	58.8	−3.7
Liberal	Jack Backer	10,296	36.1	−1.4
Democratic Labor	John George	1,448	5.1	+5.1
Total formal votes		28,528	96.4	
Informal votes		1,071	3.6	
Turnout		29,599	91.0	
Two-party-preferred result
Labor	Kevin Stewart	17,078	59.9	−2.6
Liberal	Jack Backer	11,450	40.1	+2.6
Labor hold		Swing	−2.6	

=== Casino ===
1973 New South Wales state election: Casino
Party	Candidate	Votes	%	±%
Labor	Don Day	9,530	47.1	−3.9
Country	Donald McRae	4,529	22.4	−26.6
Country	Owen Wainwright	4,092	20.2	+20.2
Independent	Clifford Hirst	2,084	10.3	+10.3
Total formal votes		20,235	99.1	
Informal votes		181	0.9	
Turnout		20,416	93.9	
Two-party-preferred result
Labor	Don Day	10,318	51.0	0.0
Country	Donald McRae	9,917	49.0	0.0
Labor hold		Swing	0.0	

=== Castlereagh ===
1973 New South Wales state election: Castlereagh
Party	Candidate	Votes	%	±%
Labor	Jack Renshaw	9,446	50.3	−6.1
Country	Albert Green	6,748	35.9	+14.4
Liberal	Lionel Gray	2,586	13.8	−2.8
Total formal votes		18,780	98.5	
Informal votes		280	1.5	
Turnout		19,060	92.1	
Two-party-preferred result
Labor	Jack Renshaw	9,640	51.3	−7.4
Country	Albert Green	9,140	48.7	+7.4
Labor hold		Swing	−7.4	

=== Cessnock ===
1973 New South Wales state election: Cessnock
Party	Candidate	Votes	%	±%
Labor	George Neilly	17,093	78.1	−2.3
Democratic Labor	Bernard Burke	4,801	21.9	+21.9
Total formal votes		21,894	97.4	
Informal votes		583	2.6	
Turnout		22,477	95.9	
Labor hold		Swing	−2.3	

=== Charlestown ===
1973 New South Wales state election: Charlestown
Party	Candidate	Votes	%	±%
Labor	Richard Face	16,543	53.9	−0.8
Liberal	Paul Clarkson	11,272	36.7	+0.3
Australia	John Steele	1,813	5.9	+2.2
Democratic Labor	Ignatius Philippa	1,062	3.5	−1.7
Total formal votes		30,690	98.0	
Informal votes		626	2.0	
Turnout		31,316	96.0	
Two-party-preferred result
Labor	Richard Face	17,910	58.4	+0.1
Liberal	Paul Clarkson	12,780	41.6	−0.1
Labor hold		Swing	+0.1	

=== Clarence ===
1973 New South Wales state election: Clarence
Party	Candidate	Votes	%	±%
Country	Matt Singleton	15,236	63.9	+28.8
Labor	Patricia Oakman	6,877	28.9	−7.2
Democratic Labor	William Eckersley	994	4.2	+4.2
Australia	Terrence Hancock	727	3.1	+3.1
Total formal votes		23,834	98.6	
Informal votes		345	1.4	
Turnout		24,179	94.4	
Two-party-preferred result
Country	Matt Singleton	16,230	68.1	+13.0
Labor	Patricia Oakman	7,604	31.9	−13.0
Country hold		Swing	+13.0	

=== Coogee ===
1973 New South Wales state election: Coogee
Party	Candidate	Votes	%	±%
Labor	Michael Cleary	13,092	45.5	+3.1
Liberal	Ross Freeman	12,958	45.1	−1.5
Australia	Ann Sutherland	1,917	6.7	+6.7
Democratic Labor	Betty Stepkovitch	779	2.7	−1.8
Total formal votes		28,746	97.1	
Informal votes		869	2.9	
Turnout		29,615	88.4	
Two-party-preferred result
Liberal	Ross Freeman	14,377	50.01	−2.9
Labor	Michael Cleary	14,369	49.99	+2.9
Liberal hold		Swing	−2.9	

- This result was annulled by the Court of Disputed Returns and a by-election was held.

=== Corrimal ===
1973 New South Wales state election: Corrimal
Party	Candidate	Votes	%	±%
Labor	Laurie Kelly	15,985	58.1	
Liberal	Robert Law	7,822	28.4	
Australia	Susan Healy	2,387	8.7	
Democratic Labor	Peter Daly	1,304	4.7	
Total formal votes		27,498	97.2	
Informal votes		796	2.8	
Turnout		28,294	92.8	
Two-party-preferred result
Labor	Laurie Kelly	17,806	64.8	+1.5
Liberal	Robert Law	9,691	35.2	−1.5
Labor hold		Swing	+1.5	

=== Cronulla ===
1973 New South Wales state election: Cronulla
Party	Candidate	Votes	%	±%
Liberal	Ian Griffith	14,782	50.8	+0.7
Labor	Michael Egan	11,686	40.2	−2.0
Australia	Marjory Gray	1,936	6.6	+6.6
Democratic Labor	Bernard Forshaw	700	2.4	+2.4
Total formal votes		29,104	98.6	
Informal votes		423	1.4	
Turnout		29,527	94.1	
Two-party-preferred result
Liberal	Ian Griffith	15,923	54.7	+2.2
Labor	Michael Egan	13,181	45.3	−2.2
Liberal hold		Swing	+2.2	

=== Davidson ===
1973 New South Wales state election: Davidson
Party	Candidate	Votes	%	±%
Liberal	Dick Healey	15,298	61.3	−18.9
Labor	Walter Willington	5,897	23.6	+23.6
Australia	Veronica Carey	2,729	10.9	+10.9
Democratic Labor	Thomas Colman	1,048	4.2	−15.6
Total formal votes		24,972	98.2	
Informal votes		454	1.8	
Turnout		25,426	93.4	
Two-party-preferred result
Liberal	Dick Healey	17,228	69.0	−11.2
Labor	Walter Willington	7,744	31.0	+31.0
Liberal hold		Swing	−11.2	

=== Drummoyne ===
1973 New South Wales state election: Drummoyne
Party	Candidate	Votes	%	±%
Labor	Michael Maher	13,701	49.8	−7.2
Liberal	Brian Barber	12,419	45.1	+2.1
Democratic Labor	Vincent Abrams	1,402	5.1	+5.1
Total formal votes		27,522	97.0	
Informal votes		841	3.0	
Turnout		28,363	93.9	
Two-party-preferred result
Labor	Michael Maher	13,950	50.7	−6.3
Liberal	Brian Barber	13,572	49.3	+6.3
Labor hold		Swing	−6.3	

=== Dubbo ===
1973 New South Wales state election: Dubbo
Party	Candidate	Votes	%	±%
Liberal	John Mason	13,695	60.8	+9.0
Labor	Emily Renshaw	7,649	34.0	−6.2
Democratic Labor	Michael Stephens	1,173	5.2	−2.8
Total formal votes		22,517	98.8	
Informal votes		283	1.2	
Turnout		22,800	94.3	
Two-party-preferred result
Liberal	John Mason	14,633	65.0	+6.8
Labor	Emily Renshaw	7,884	35.0	−6.8
Liberal hold		Swing	+6.8	

=== Earlwood ===
1973 New South Wales state election: Earlwood
Party	Candidate	Votes	%	±%
Liberal	Eric Willis	15,498	51.6	−5.7
Labor	Colin Williams	11,628	38.7	−4.0
Australia	Alexander Paterson	1,566	5.2	+5.2
Democratic Labor	Doris Allison	1,331	4.4	+4.4
Total formal votes		30,023	97.2	
Informal votes		848	2.8	
Turnout		30,871	95.1	
Two-party-preferred result
Liberal	Eric Willis	17,033	56.7	−0.6
Labor	Colin Williams	12,990	43.3	+0.6
Liberal hold		Swing	−0.6	

=== East Hills ===
1973 New South Wales state election: East Hills
Party	Candidate	Votes	%	±%
Labor	Pat Rogan	16,337	54.4	−2.5
Liberal	John Edwards	9,842	32.8	+11.5
Australia	Robert Walsh	2,165	7.2	+7.2
Democratic Labor	John Anderson	1,664	5.6	+5.6
Total formal votes		30,008	97.8	
Informal votes		659	2.2	
Turnout		30,667	95.4	
Two-party-preferred result
Labor	Pat Rogan	18,337	61.1	−2.3
Liberal	John Edwards	11,671	38.9	+2.3
Labor hold		Swing	−2.3	

=== Eastwood ===
1973 New South Wales state election: Eastwood
Party	Candidate	Votes	%	±%
Liberal	Jim Clough	17,980	62.5	+3.3
Australia	John Butterworth	7,956	27.7	+27.7
Democratic Labor	Paul Burton	2,834	9.8	+9.8
Total formal votes		28,770	97.3	
Informal votes		788	2.7	
Turnout		29,558	92.8	
Two-candidate-preferred result
Liberal	Jim Clough	19,397	67.4	−0.9
Australia	John Butterworth	9,373	32.6	+32.6
Liberal hold		Swing	−0.9	

=== Fairfield ===
1973 New South Wales state election: Fairfield
Party	Candidate	Votes	%	±%
Labor	Eric Bedford	17,713	64.0	−0.3
Liberal	Domenic Pangallo	7,843	28.3	−3.6
Australia	Robert Tuckwell	1,297	4.7	+4.7
Democratic Labor	Maurice George	840	3.0	+3.0
Total formal votes		27,693	95.0	
Informal votes		1,458	5.0	
Turnout		29,151	92.2	
Two-party-preferred result
Labor	Eric Bedford	18,789	67.8	−1.6
Liberal	Domenic Pangallo	8,904	32.2	+1.6
Labor hold		Swing	−1.6	

=== Fuller ===
1973 New South Wales state election: Fuller
Party	Candidate	Votes	%	±%
Liberal	Peter Coleman	14,260	49.8	+3.6
Labor	William Waters	10,231	35.7	−7.5
Australia	Jean Braithwaite	1,932	6.8	+6.8
Independent	Philip Arantz	1,366	4.8	+4.8
Democratic Labor	Timothy Abrams	849	3.0	+3.0
Total formal votes		28,638	97.6	
Informal votes		711	2.4	
Turnout		29,349	93.2	
Two-party-preferred result
Liberal	Peter Coleman	15,823	55.3	+3.1
Labor	William Waters	12,815	44.7	−3.1
Liberal hold		Swing	+3.1	

=== Georges River ===
1973 New South Wales state election: Georges River
Party	Candidate	Votes	%	±%
Labor	Frank Walker	13,533	45.4	−6.0
Liberal	Roderick MacKenzie	13,241	44.4	−4.2
Australia	Peter Eden	1,614	5.4	+5.4
Democratic Labor	Charles Kane	845	2.8	+2.8
Independent	Kenneth Cavanough	555	1.9	+1.9
Total formal votes		29,7888	97.9	
Informal votes		631	2.1	
Turnout		30,419	95.3	
Two-party-preferred result
Labor	Frank Walker	15,103	50.7	−0.7
Liberal	Roderick MacKenzie	14,685	49.3	+0.7
Labor hold		Swing	−0.7	

=== Gloucester ===
1973 New South Wales state election: Gloucester
Party	Candidate	Votes	%	±%
Country	Leon Punch	12,708	65.2	+3.1
Labor	Terence Wallis	4,355	22.3	−5.3
Democratic Labor	Herbert Collins	2,435	12.5	+12.5
Total formal votes		19,498	98.6	
Informal votes		273	1.4	
Turnout		19,771	92.7	
Two-party-preferred result
Country	Leon Punch	14,656	75.2	+10.4
Labor	Terence Wallis	4,842	24.8	−10.4
Country hold		Swing	+10.4	

=== Gordon ===
1973 New South Wales state election: Gordon
Party	Candidate	Votes	%	±%
Democratic Labor	Kevin Harrold	20,707	79.4	+61.0
Labor	Miron Shapira	5,372	20.6	+20.6
Total formal votes		26,079	96.3	
Informal votes		1,004	3.7	
Turnout		27,083	92.3	
Democratic Labor gain from Liberal		Swing	N/A	

The sitting member was Harry Jago (Liberal) who failed to nominate in time.

=== Gosford ===
1973 New South Wales state election: Gosford
Party	Candidate	Votes	%	±%
Liberal	Malcolm Brooks	12,307	52.7	+6.6
Labor	Brian McGowan	10,182	43.6	−4.3
Democratic Labor	William Dunbar	873	3.7	+3.7
Total formal votes		23,362	98.3	
Informal votes		396	1.7	
Turnout		23,758	93.5	
Two-party-preferred result
Liberal	Malcolm Brooks	13,005	55.7	+4.6
Labor	Brian McGowan	10,357	44.3	−4.6
Liberal notional hold		Swing	+4.6	

The sitting member was Keith O'Connell (Labor) however the 1973 redistribution made Gosford a notional Liberal seat and O'Connell successfully contested the new seat of Peats.

=== Goulburn ===
1973 New South Wales state election: Goulburn
Party	Candidate	Votes	%	±%
Country	Ron Brewer	13,386	64.0	+2.0
Labor	Noel Lane	6,453	30.8	−7.2
Democratic Labor	Raymond Albrighton	773	3.7	+3.7
Independent	Evan Treharne	311	1.5	+1.5
Total formal votes		20,923	98.3	
Informal votes		354	1.7	
Turnout		21,277	95.0	
Two-party-preferred result
Country	Ron Brewer	14,215	67.9	+5.9
Labor	Noel Lane	6,708	32.1	−5.9
Country hold		Swing	+5.9	

=== Granville ===
1973 New South Wales state election: Granville
Party	Candidate	Votes	%	±%
Labor	Pat Flaherty	18,353	66.5	−0.8
Liberal	John Newland	7,964	28.9	−3.8
Democratic Labor	Terrence Luthy	1,266	4.6	+4.6
Total formal votes		27,583	96.4	
Informal votes		1,032	3.6	
Turnout		28,615	92.6	
Two-party-preferred result
Labor	Pat Flaherty	18,606	67.5	+0.2
Liberal	John Newland	8,977	32.5	−0.2
Labor hold		Swing	+0.2	

=== Hawkesbury ===
1973 New South Wales state election: Hawkesbury
Party	Candidate	Votes	%	±%
Liberal	Kevin Rozzoli	16,183	60.9	+10.0
Labor	Peter Stone	8,050	30.3	−12.3
Independent	John McMahon	840	3.2	+3.2
Australia	Peter Knowland	762	2.9	+2.9
Democratic Labor	Emma Ekman	727	2.7	+2.7
Total formal votes		26,562	96.7	
Informal votes		912	3.3	
Turnout		27,474	91.8	
Two-party-preferred result
Liberal	Kevin Rozzoli	17,664	66.5	+10.0
Labor	Peter Stone	8,898	33.5	−10.0
Liberal hold		Swing	+10.0	

=== Heathcote ===
1973 New South Wales state election: Heathcote
Party	Candidate	Votes	%	±%
Labor	Rex Jackson	16,490	58.5	0.0
Liberal	Philip Benwell	8,069	28.6	−5.0
Independent	Norman Tonkin	2,743	9.7	+9.7
Democratic Labor	Margaret Silva	887	3.2	+3.2
Total formal votes		28,189	97.9	
Informal votes		617	2.1	
Turnout		28,806	94.0	
Two-party-preferred result
Labor	Rex Jackson	18,464	65.5	−1.7
Liberal	Philip Benwell	9,725	34.5	+1.7
Labor hold		Swing	−1.7	

=== Heffron ===
1973 New South Wales state election: Heffron
Party	Candidate	Votes	%	±%
Labor	Laurie Brereton	18,753	68.0	+1.9
Democratic Labor	Paul Evans	5,596	20.3	+20.3
Australia	Peter Clark	3,233	11.7	+11.7
Total formal votes		27,582	94.8	
Informal votes		1,525	5.2	
Turnout		29,107	89.6	
Two-candidate-preferred result
Labor	Laurie Brereton	20,369	73.8	+7.7
Democratic Labor	Paul Evans	7,213	26.2	+26.2
Labor notional hold		Swing	+7.7	

Heffron was a new seat with a notional Labor majority.

=== Hornsby ===
1973 New South Wales state election: Hornsby
Party	Candidate	Votes	%	±%
Liberal	Neil Pickard	17,788	60.0	+5.6
Labor	Brian Silvia	9,852	33.2	+33.2
Democratic Labor	Cecil Wallace	2,021	6.8	+0.3
Total formal votes		29,661	97.9	
Informal votes		647	2.1	
Turnout		30,308	93.2	
Two-party-preferred result
Liberal	Neil Pickard	19,405	65.4	+5.6
Labor	Brian Silvia	10,256	34.6	+34.6
Liberal hold		Swing	+5.6	

=== Hurstville ===
1973 New South Wales state election: Hurstville
Party	Candidate	Votes	%	±%
Liberal	Tom Mead	14,228	48.7	+1.3
Labor	Kevin Ryan	12,398	42.5	+2.0
Independent	Paul Flottmann	1,761	6.0	+6.0
Democratic Labor	Anthony Young	821	2.8	−2.5
Total formal votes		29,208	98.1	
Informal votes		558	1.9	
Turnout		29,766	94.0	
Two-party-preferred result
Liberal	Tom Mead	15,504	53.1	+0.3
Labor	Kevin Ryan	13,704	46.9	−0.3
Liberal hold		Swing	+0.3	

=== Illawarra ===
1973 New South Wales state election: Illawarra
Party	Candidate	Votes	%	±%
Labor	George Petersen	19,523	72.7	+13.0
Democratic Labor	Everardus Himmelreich	7,318	27.3	+22.8
Total formal votes		26,841	95.3	
Informal votes		1,323	4.7	
Turnout		28,164	93.0	
Labor hold		Swing	+1.6	

=== Kirribilli ===
1973 New South Wales state election: Kirribilli
Party	Candidate	Votes	%	±%
Liberal	John Waddy	13,981	59.2	+4.1
Labor	Irene Anderson	8,124	34.4	+4.3
Democratic Labor	Margaret Colman	1,521	6.4	−5.4
Total formal votes		23,626	97.5	
Informal votes		609	2.5	
Turnout		24,235	84.9	
Two-party-preferred result
Liberal	John Waddy	15,198	64.3	−1.7
Labor	Irene Anderson	8,428	35.7	+1.7
Liberal hold		Swing	−1.7	

=== Kogarah ===
1973 New South Wales state election: Kogarah
Party	Candidate	Votes	%	±%
Labor	Bill Crabtree	16,258	54.3	−0.1
Liberal	Edward Griffiths	12,497	41.7	+2.8
Democratic Labor	Harold Rich	1,195	4.0	+4.0
Total formal votes		29,950	97.9	
Informal votes		635	2.1	
Turnout		30,585	93.5	
Two-party-preferred result
Labor	Bill Crabtree	16,497	55.1	−3.5
Liberal	Edward Griffiths	13,453	44.9	+3.5
Labor hold		Swing	−3.5	

=== Ku-ring-gai ===
1973 New South Wales state election: Ku-ring-gai
Party	Candidate	Votes	%	±%
Liberal	John Maddison	21,357	77.6	
Labor	Ian Cameron	4,932	17.9	
Democratic Labor	Norma Boyle	1,235	4.5	
Total formal votes		27,524	98.1	
Informal votes		525	1.9	
Turnout		28,049	92.6	
Two-party-preferred result
Liberal	John Maddison	22,345	81.2	+0.1
Labor	Ian Cameron	5,179	18.8	−0.1
Liberal notional hold		Swing	+0.1	

Ku-ring-gai was a new seat with a notional Liberal majority.

=== Lake Macquarie ===
1973 New South Wales state election: Lake Macquarie
Party	Candidate	Votes	%	±%
Labor	Merv Hunter	17,355	66.0	+1.1
Independent	Colin Fisher	5,102	19.4	+19.4
Democratic Labor	Donald Richards	3,851	14.6	+14.6
Total formal votes		26,308	97.4	
Informal votes		701	2.6	
Turnout		27,009	93.8	
Two-candidate-preferred result
Labor	Merv Hunter	19,281	73.2	+8.3
Independent	Colin Fisher	7,027	26.8	+26.8
Labor hold		Swing	+8.3	

=== Lakemba ===
1973 New South Wales state election: Lakemba
Party	Candidate	Votes	%	±%
Labor	Vince Durick	17,464	56.9	−2.5
Liberal	Philip Gregory	11,313	36.9	−3.7
Independent	Douglas Morgan	1,145	3.7	+3.7
Democratic Labor	Anthony Hook	769	2.5	+2.5
Total formal votes		30,691	96.5	
Informal votes		1,110	3.5	
Turnout		31,801	92.3	
Two-party-preferred result
Labor	Vince Durick	18,323	59.7	+0.3
Liberal	Philip Gregory	12,368	40.3	−0.3
Labor hold		Swing	+0.3	

=== Lane Cove ===
1973 New South Wales state election: Lane Cove
Party	Candidate	Votes	%	±%
Liberal	Ken McCaw	16,681	61.0	+1.7
Labor	Robert Toner	5,367	19.6	−2.8
Australia	Malcolm Hilbery	3,540	12.9	+0.6
Democratic Labor	Francis Hernage	1,270	4.6	−1.5
Independent	Gregory Lewis	315	1.2	+1.2
Independent	Peter Livesey	174	0.6	+0.6
Total formal votes		27,347	97.5	
Informal votes		706	2.5	
Turnout		28,053	90.3	
Two-party-preferred result
Liberal	Ken McCaw	18,951	69.3	+0.2
Labor	Robert Toner	8,396	30.7	−0.2
Liberal hold		Swing	+0.2	

=== Lismore ===
1973 New South Wales state election: Lismore
Party	Candidate	Votes	%	±%
Country	Bruce Duncan	15,120	71.8	−28.2
Labor	Frederick Braid	5,105	24.2	+24.2
Democratic Labor	William Hunt	576	2.7	+2.7
Independent	William Hargrave	258	1.2	+1.2
Total formal votes		21,059	98.5	
Informal votes		329	1.5	
Turnout		21,388	93.1	
Two-party-preferred result
Country	Bruce Duncan	15,751	74.8	−25.2
Labor	Frederick Braid	5,308	25.2	+25.2
Country hold		Swing	−25.2	

=== Liverpool ===
1973 New South Wales state election: Liverpool
Party	Candidate	Votes	%	±%
Labor	George Paciullo	18,622	66.9	+0.2
Liberal	Richard Lennon	7,678	27.6	+4.2
Democratic Labor	Doris Brown	1,526	5.5	−4.4
Total formal votes		27,826	96.1	
Informal votes		1,128	3.9	
Turnout		28,954	92.5	
Two-party-preferred result
Labor	George Paciullo	18,926	68.0	−0.7
Liberal	Richard Lennon	8,900	32.0	+0.7
Labor hold		Swing	−0.7	

=== Maitland ===
1973 New South Wales state election: Maitland
Party	Candidate	Votes	%	±%
Liberal	Milton Morris	15,295	64.4	+6.4
Labor	George Lyons	6,894	29.1	−6.6
Democratic Labor	Reginald Hughes	1,542	6.5	+0.2
Total formal votes		23,731	98.3	
Informal votes		401	1.7	
Turnout		24,132	96.2	
Two-party-preferred result
Liberal	Milton Morris	16,517	69.6	+6.1
Labor	George Lyons	7,214	30.4	−6.1
Liberal hold		Swing	+6.1	

=== Manly ===
1973 New South Wales state election: Manly
Party	Candidate	Votes	%	±%
Liberal	Douglas Darby	14,231	55.1	−3.9
Labor	Allan Hughes	7,755	30.0	−1.8
Australia	John Alexander	2,912	11.3	+11.3
Democratic Labor	Bernard Fox	940	3.6	−3.8
Total formal votes		25,838	97.6	
Informal votes		637	2.4	
Turnout		26,475	90.6	
Two-party-preferred result
Liberal	Douglas Darby	16,278	63.0	−2.8
Labor	Allan Hughes	9,560	37.0	+2.8
Liberal hold		Swing	−2.8	

=== Maroubra ===
1973 New South Wales state election: Maroubra
Party	Candidate	Votes	%	±%
Labor	Bill Haigh	15,427	55.5	−3.5
Liberal	Ronald Burkitt	9,633	34.7	+0.8
Australia	Norwood Hartley	1,709	6.2	+6.2
Democratic Labor	John Martin	1,025	3.7	−1.6
Total formal votes		27,794	97.0	
Informal votes		862	3.0	
Turnout		28,656	91.4	
Two-party-preferred result
Labor	Bill Haigh	16,649	59.9	−1.0
Liberal	Ronald Burkitt	11,145	40.1	+1.0
Labor hold		Swing	−1.0	

=== Marrickville ===
1973 New South Wales state election: Marrickville
Party	Candidate	Votes	%	±%
Labor	Tom Cahill	17,972	66.8	+3.3
Liberal	George Lamont	7,634	28.4	−8.1
Democratic Labor	Anthony Kiely	1,315	4.9	+4.9
Total formal votes		26,921	95.1	
Informal votes		1,379	4.9	
Turnout		28,300	90.0	
Two-party-preferred result
Labor	Tom Cahill	18,235	67.7	+4.2
Liberal	George Lamont	8,686	32.3	−4.2
Labor hold		Swing	+4.2	

=== Merrylands ===
1973 New South Wales state election: Merrylands
Party	Candidate	Votes	%	±%
Labor	Jack Ferguson	17,770	58.1	−9.1
Liberal	Garry Dent	11,140	36.4	+3.6
Australia	Geoffrey Thomas	1,682	5.5	+5.5
Total formal votes		30,592	96.3	
Informal votes		1,160	3.7	
Turnout		31,752	92.3	
Two-party-preferred result
Labor	Jack Ferguson	18,947	61.9	−5.3
Liberal	Garry Dent	11,645	38.1	+5.3
Labor hold		Swing	−5.3	

=== Miranda ===
1973 New South Wales state election: Miranda
Party	Candidate	Votes	%	±%
Liberal	Tim Walker	14,484	51.2	+4.3
Labor	John Brookfield	10,653	37.6	−3.2
Australia	Neva Wendt	2,083	7.4	−0.1
Democratic Labor	Bill Casey	1,085	3.8	−0.9
Total formal votes		28,305	98.4	
Informal votes		451	1.6	
Turnout		28,756	94.8	
Two-party-preferred result
Liberal	Tim Walker	15,977	56.4	+3.8
Labor	John Brookfield	12,328	43.6	−3.8
Liberal hold		Swing	+3.8	

=== Monaro ===
1973 New South Wales state election: Monaro
Party	Candidate	Votes	%	±%
Liberal	Steve Mauger	10,876	54.2	+1.0
Labor	Margaret Gleeson	8,420	42.0	−4.8
Democratic Labor	Gerald O'Shaughnessy	776	3.9	+3.9
Total formal votes		20,072	97.5	
Informal votes		514	2.5	
Turnout		20,586	91.3	
Two-party-preferred result
Liberal	Steve Mauger	11,497	57.3	+4.1
Labor	Margaret Gleeson	8,575	42.7	−4.1
Liberal hold		Swing	+4.1	

=== Mosman ===
1973 New South Wales state election: Mosman
Party	Candidate	Votes	%	±%
Liberal	David Arblaster	17,200	66.0	+3.3
Australia	Allan Mann	6,763	25.9	+15.9
Democratic Labor	Peter Keogh	2,112	8.1	+0.3
Total formal votes		26,075	97.4	
Informal votes		707	2.6	
Turnout		26,782	90.9	
Two-candidate-preferred result
Liberal	David Arblaster	18,256	70.0	−3.4
Australia	Allan Mann	7,819	30.0	+30.0
Liberal hold		Swing	−3.4	

=== Mount Druitt ===
1973 New South Wales state election: Mount Druitt
Party	Candidate	Votes	%	±%
Labor	Tony Johnson	13,423	57.8	−7.2
Liberal	Neiven Harrison	6,765	29.1	−5.9
Independent	Patrick Chalker	2,196	9.5	+9.5
Democratic Labor	Francesco Rea	835	3.6	+3.6
Total formal votes		23,219	95.9	
Informal votes		991	4.1	
Turnout		24,210	91.5	
Two-party-preferred result
Labor	Tony Johnson	14,688	63.3	−1.7
Liberal	Neiven Harrison	8,531	36.7	+1.7
Labor hold		Swing	−1.7	

=== Munmorah ===
1973 New South Wales state election: Munmorah
Party	Candidate	Votes	%	±%
Labor	Harry Jensen	17,551	63.5	−3.0
Liberal	William Jackson	8,528	30.8	+1.7
Democratic Labor	Raymond Connolly	1,570	5.7	+1.3
Total formal votes		27,649	98.4	
Informal votes		446	1.6	
Turnout		28,095	94.4	
Two-party-preferred result
Labor	Harry Jensen	17,865	64.6	−2.6
Liberal	William Jackson	9,784	35.4	+2.6
Labor hold		Swing	−2.6	

=== Murray ===
1973 New South Wales state election: Murray
Party	Candidate	Votes	%	±%
Independent	Bruce Jeffery	5,942	34.6	+34.6
Liberal	Mary Meillon	5,723	33.3	+19.0
Labor	Douglas Drew	4,045	23.6	+23.6
Independent	Gregory Graham	1,041	6.1	+6.1
Democratic Labor	Brian Maw	351	2.0	−6.3
Independent	Kevin Lowndes	62	0.4	+0.4
Total formal votes		17,164	96.4	
Informal votes		647	3.6	
Turnout		17,811	89.5	
Two-party-preferred result
Liberal	Mary Meillon	11,980	69.8	
Labor	Douglas Drew	5,184	30.2	
Two-candidate-preferred result
Liberal	Mary Meillon	9,044	52.7	+52.7
Independent	Bruce Jeffery	8,120	47.3	+47.3
Liberal gain from Independent		Swing	N/A	

=== Murrumbidgee ===
1973 New South Wales state election: Murrumbidgee
Party	Candidate	Votes	%	±%
Labor	Lin Gordon	9,712	49.7	−4.0
Liberal	Donald Mackay	5,309	27.2	+0.8
Country	Bernardino Zappacosta	4,042	20.7	+5.8
Democratic Labor	John Hagan	465	2.4	−2.5
Total formal votes		19,528	97.9	
Informal votes		411	2.1	
Turnout		19,939	91.8	
Two-party-preferred result
Labor	Lin Gordon	10,100	51.7	−4.5
Liberal	Donald Mackay	9,428	48.3	+4.5
Labor hold		Swing	−4.5	

=== Nepean ===
1973 New South Wales state election: Nepean
Party	Candidate	Votes	%	±%
Liberal	Ron Rofe	12,526	47.3	
Labor	Kathleen Tucker	10,240	38.7	
Independent	John Allan	1,470	5.6	
Independent	Gregory Woodward	1,435	5.4	
Democratic Labor	David Sanson	677	2.6	
Independent	Maurice Sharp	120	0.5	
Total formal votes		26,468	96.4	
Informal votes		976	3.6	
Turnout		27,444	92.6	
Two-party-preferred result
Liberal	Ron Rofe	14,097	53.3	+1.4
Labor	Kathleen Tucker	12,371	46.7	−1.4
Liberal notional hold		Swing	+1.4	

The sitting member was Ron Mulock (Labor) however the 1973 redistribution made Gosford a notional Liberal seat and Mulock successfully contested the new seat of Penrith.

=== Newcastle ===
1973 New South Wales state election: Newcastle
Party	Candidate	Votes	%	±%
Labor	Arthur Wade	15,241	58.6	−0.2
Liberal	Richard Bevan	7,994	30.7	−4.4
Australia	Peter Baldwin	1,903	7.3	+4.2
Democratic Labor	Charin Godfrey	872	3.4	+0.4
Total formal votes		26,010	97.6	
Informal votes		631	2.4	
Turnout		26,641	94.0	
Two-party-preferred result
Labor	Arthur Wade	16,367	62.9	+1.3
Liberal	Richard Bevan	9,643	37.1	−1.3
Labor hold		Swing	+1.3	

=== Northcott ===
1973 New South Wales state election: Northcott
Party	Candidate	Votes	%	±%
Liberal	Jim Cameron	18,686	65.4	−1.7
Australia	Vivienne Berzin	6,829	23.9	+2.7
Democratic Labor	Michael Kane	2,449	8.6	+8.6
Republican	Franciscus Leechburch-Auwers	616	2.2	+2.2
Total formal votes		28,580	97.2	
Informal votes		830	2.8	
Turnout		29,410	93.2	
Two-candidate-preferred result
Liberal	Jim Cameron	20,219	70.4	−2.6
Australia	Vivienne Berzin	8,361	29.6	+2.6
Liberal hold		Swing	−2.6	

=== Orange ===
1973 New South Wales state election: Orange
Party	Candidate	Votes	%	±%
Country	Charles Cutler	14,596	65.8	+12.4
Labor	Joseph Ryan	6,387	28.8	−3.5
Democratic Labor	Robert Hansen	1,202	5.4	−0.4
Total formal votes		22,185	98.5	
Informal votes		337	1.5	
Turnout		22,522	94.5	
Two-party-preferred result
Country	Charles Cutler	15,558	70.1	+8.6
Labor	Joseph Ryan	6,627	29.9	−8.6
Country hold		Swing	+8.6	

=== Oxley ===
1973 New South Wales state election: Oxley
Party	Candidate	Votes	%	±%
Country	Bruce Cowan	15,020	70.1	−6.7
Labor	Bruce Langford	5,772	26.9	+26.9
Democratic Labor	Gary Phillips	630	2.9	+2.9
Total formal votes		21,422	98.7	
Informal votes		287	1.3	
Turnout		21,709	95.5	
Two-party-preferred result
Country	Bruce Cowan	15,558	72.6	−4.2
Labor	Bruce Langford	6,627	27.4	+27.4
Country hold		Swing	−4.2	

=== Parramatta ===
1973 New South Wales state election: Parramatta
Party	Candidate	Votes	%	±%
Labor	Dan Mahoney	16,524	55.6	−1.6
Liberal	Hilton Robinson	11,719	39.5	−0.3
Democratic Labor	Mary Woodbury	1,464	4.9	+4.9
Total formal votes		29,707	97.9	
Informal votes		643	2.1	
Turnout		30,350	90.4	
Two-party-preferred result
Labor	Dan Mahoney	16,817	56.6	−3.1
Liberal	Hilton Robinson	12,890	43.4	+3.1
Labor hold		Swing	−3.1	

=== Peats ===
1973 New South Wales state election: Peats
Party	Candidate	Votes	%	±%
Labor	Keith O'Connell	15,948	57.3	−1.5
Liberal	Graeme Hallett	11,886	42.7	+1.5
Total formal votes		27,834	97.8	
Informal votes		617	2.2	
Turnout		28,451	93.4	
Labor notional hold		Swing	−1.5	

Peats was a new seat with a notional Labor majority.

=== Penrith ===
1973 New South Wales state election: Penrith
Party	Candidate	Votes	%	±%
Labor	Ron Mulock	15,634	56.6	
Liberal	Eileen Cammack	10,623	38.5	
Independent	Joseph Stein	1,369	5.0	
Total formal votes		27,626	97.1	
Informal votes		813	2.9	
Turnout		28,439	91.5	
Two-party-preferred result
Labor	Ron Mulock	16,547	59.9	+0.8
Liberal	Eileen Cammack	11,079	40.1	−0.8
Labor notional hold		Swing	+0.8	

Penrith was a new seat with a notional Labor majority.

=== Phillip ===
1973 New South Wales state election: Phillip
Party	Candidate	Votes	%	±%
Labor	Pat Hills	16,523	65.5	−6.6
Liberal	Walter O'Donoghue	4,594	18.2	−1.3
Australia	Jennifer Baker	1,831	7.3	+7.3
Democratic Labor	Kristina Aster-Stater	1,007	4.0	−4.4
Communist	Joseph Owens	838	3.3	+3.3
Independent	John Hawkins	436	1.7	+1.7
Total formal votes		25,229	94.3	
Informal votes		1,514	5.7	
Turnout		26,743	83.9	
Two-party-preferred result
Labor	Pat Hills	18,900	74.9	+1.1
Liberal	Walter O'Donoghue	6,329	25.1	−1.1
Labor hold		Swing	+1.1	

=== Pittwater ===
1973 New South Wales state election: Pittwater
Party	Candidate	Votes	%	±%
Liberal	Robert Askin	15,522	64.0	+2.0
Labor	Dorothy Jeffery	7,144	29.5	+29.5
Democratic Labor	Kevin Lee	1,583	6.5	+0.3
Total formal votes		24,249	97.6	
Informal votes		607	2.4	
Turnout		24,856	90.6	
Two-party-preferred result
Liberal	Robert Askin	16,788	69.2	−1.4
Labor	Dorothy Jeffery	7,461	30.8	+1.4
Liberal notional hold		Swing	−1.4	

Pittwater was a new seat with a notional Liberal majority.

=== Raleigh ===
1973 New South Wales state election: Raleigh
Party	Candidate	Votes	%	±%
Country	Jim Brown	14,347	68.4	+8.0
Labor	Ken Reed	6,613	31.6	+0.8
Total formal votes		20,960	98.5	
Informal votes		309	1.5	
Turnout		21,269	94.5	
Country hold		Swing	+2.9	

=== Rockdale ===
1973 New South Wales state election: Rockdale
Party	Candidate	Votes	%	±%
Labor	Brian Bannon	16,826	62.7	
Liberal	Kenneth Gates	9,056	33.7	
Democratic Labor	Alan Lewis	968	3.6	
Total formal votes		26,850	96.3	
Informal votes		1,019	3.7	
Turnout		27,869	93.5	
Two-party-preferred result
Labor	Brian Bannon	17,020	63.4	0.0
Liberal	Kenneth Gates	9,830	36.6	0.0
Labor hold		Swing	0.0	

=== South Coast ===
1973 New South Wales state election: South Coast
Party	Candidate	Votes	%	±%
Independent	John Hatton	10,421	44.7	−4.4
Liberal	Doug Otton	8,264	35.5	−15.4
Country	Alexander Cochrane	1,502	6.5	+6.5
Independent	Robert Coburn	1,440	6.2	+6.2
Country	Basil Emery	1,289	5.5	+5.5
Independent	Robert Burke	381	1.6	+1.6
Total formal votes		23,297	96.8	
Informal votes		764	3.2	
Turnout		24,061	93.1	
Two-candidate-preferred result
Independent	John Hatton	12,048	51.7	+2.6
Liberal	Doug Otton	11,249	48.3	−2.6
Independent gain from Liberal		Swing	+2.6	

The sitting member Jack Beale (Liberal) resigned from Parliament in October 1973.

=== Sturt ===
1973 New South Wales state election: Sturt
Party	Candidate	Votes	%	±%
Country	Tim Fischer	13,012	67.6	+28.1
Labor	John Foley	5,259	27.3	+27.3
Democratic Labor	Joseph Lenehan	962	5.0	−3.8
Total formal votes		19,233	98.8	
Informal votes		240	1.2	
Turnout		19,473	93.7	
Two-party-preferred result
Country	Tim Fischer	13,782	71.7	+7.4
Labor	John Foley	5,454	28.3	+28.3
Country hold		Swing	+7.4	

=== Tamworth ===
1973 New South Wales state election: Tamworth
Party	Candidate	Votes	%	±%
Country	Noel Park	7,884	35.9	−6.9
Liberal	Neil Roberts	5,902	26.9	+26.9
Labor	William Forrest	3,888	17.7	−17.3
Labor	William Bischoff	2,959	13.5	+13.5
Australia	Joan Byrne	559	2.6	+2.6
Independent	Leonard Hill	467	2.1	+2.1
Democratic Labor	Peter Young	304	1.4	+1.4
Total formal votes		21,963	95.9	
Informal votes		943	4.1	
Turnout		22,906	94.0	
Two-party-preferred result
Country	Noel Park	13,975	63.6	+5.5
Labor	William Forrest	7,988	36.4	−5.5
Country hold		Swing	+5.5	

=== Temora ===
1973 New South Wales state election: Temora
Party	Candidate	Votes	%	±%
Country	Jim Taylor	11,171	64.2	+12.7
Labor	Alroy Provan	4,520	26.0	−11.4
Democratic Labor	Terence Brady	959	5.5	+5.5
Independent	Donald Douglas	760	4.4	+4.4
Total formal votes		17,410	99.0	
Informal votes		170	1.0	
Turnout		17,580	88.5	
Two-party-preferred result
Country	Jim Taylor	12,274	70.5	+13.5
Labor	Alroy Provan	5,136	29.5	−13.5
Country hold		Swing	+13.5	

=== Tenterfield ===
1973 New South Wales state election: Tenterfield
Party	Candidate	Votes	%	±%
Country	Tim Bruxner	13,005	68.6	+12.1
Labor	Alice Clifford	5,944	31.4	−7.8
Total formal votes		18,949	98.8	
Informal votes		234	1.2	
Turnout		19,183	91.7	
Country hold		Swing	+9.9	

=== The Hills ===
1973 New South Wales state election: The Hills
Party	Candidate	Votes	%	±%
Liberal	Max Ruddock	16,988	66.4	+6.0
Labor	Judith Mackinolty	7,376	28.8	−3.1
Democratic Labor	John Woulfe	1,225	4.8	−2.8
Total formal votes		25,589	98.4	
Informal votes		418	1.6	
Turnout		26,007	95.0	
Two-party-preferred result
Liberal	Max Ruddock	17,968	70.2	+3.7
Labor	Judith Mackinolty	7,621	29.8	−3.7
Liberal hold		Swing	+3.7	

=== Upper Hunter ===
1973 New South Wales state election: Upper Hunter
Party	Candidate	Votes	%	±%
Country	Col Fisher	14,413	61.2	+4.6
Labor	Kenneth Cosgrove	8,360	35.5	−7.9
Democratic Labor	Kathleen Buckingham	711	3.3	+3.3
Total formal votes		23,544	98.8	
Informal votes		277	1.2	
Turnout		23,821	95.2	
Two-party-preferred result
Country	Col Fisher	15,030	63.8	+7.2
Labor	Kenneth Cosgrove	8,514	36.2	−7.2
Country hold		Swing	+7.2	

=== Vaucluse ===
1973 New South Wales state election: Vaucluse
Party	Candidate	Votes	%	±%
Liberal	Keith Doyle	15,906	63.1	−1.1
Australia	Brian Hickey	6,403	25.4	+25.4
Democratic Labor	Doris Anderson	2,901	11.5	+11.5
Total formal votes		25,210	94.5	
Informal votes		1,463	5.5	
Turnout		26,673	88.0	
Two-candidate-preferred result
Liberal	Keith Doyle	17,357	68.8	+0.3
Australia	Brian Hickey	7,853	31.2	+31.2
Liberal hold		Swing	+0.3	

=== Wagga Wagga ===
1973 New South Wales state election: Wagga Wagga
Party	Candidate	Votes	%	±%
Liberal	Wal Fife	13,105	63.6	+2.7
Labor	Kenneth Fletcher	5,429	26.4	−3.9
Democratic Labor	Kevin Murphy	1,088	5.3	−3.5
Australia	Pamela Osmond	985	4.8	+4.8
Total formal votes		20,607	98.5	
Informal votes		315	1.5	
Turnout		20,922	92.2	
Two-party-preferred result
Liberal	Wal Fife	14,369	69.7	+1.7
Labor	Kenneth Fletcher	6,238	30.3	−1.7
Liberal hold		Swing	+1.7	

=== Wakehurst ===
1973 New South Wales state election: Wakehurst
Party	Candidate	Votes	%	±%
Liberal	Allan Viney	14,876	53.4	−0.9
Labor	Colin McIlwraith	8,801	31.6	−7.0
Australia	Pamela Wilson	2,770	9.9	+9.9
Democratic Labor	Terrence Fay	1,412	5.1	−2.0
Total formal votes		27,859	97.3	
Informal votes		782	2.7	
Turnout		28,641	90.4	
Two-party-preferred result
Liberal	Allan Viney	17,114	61.4	+1.4
Labor	Colin McIlwraith	10,745	38.6	−1.4
Liberal hold		Swing	+1.4	

=== Wallsend ===
1973 New South Wales state election: Wallsend
Party	Candidate	Votes	%	±%
Labor	Ken Booth	22,602	71.3	+2.6
Democratic Labor	Robert Godfrey	5,821	18.4	+14.9
Australia	Desmond Kynaston	3,273	10.3	+10.3
Total formal votes		31,696	96.8	
Informal votes		1,044	3.2	
Turnout		32,740	95.7	
Two-candidate-preferred result
Labor	Ken Booth	24,239	76.5	+7.1
Democratic Labor	Robert Godfrey	7,457	23.5	+23.5
Labor hold		Swing	+7.1	

=== Waratah ===
1973 New South Wales state election: Waratah
Party	Candidate	Votes	%	±%
Labor	Sam Jones	21,158	72.4	+3.8
Democratic Labor	Anne McCosker	5,600	19.2	+19.2
Independent	George Wawryck	2,453	8.4	+8.4
Total formal votes		29,211	97.0	
Informal votes		910	3.0	
Turnout		30,121	94.9	
Two-candidate-preferred result
Labor	Sam Jones	22,385	76.6	+8.0
Democratic Labor	Anne McCosker	6,826	23.4	+23.4
Labor hold		Swing	+8.0	

=== Waverley ===
1973 New South Wales state election: Waverley
Party	Candidate	Votes	%	±%
Labor	Syd Einfeld	12,065	51.1	−7.5
Liberal	Hans Dreyer	9,031	38.2	−3.2
Australia	Virginia Walker	1,586	6.7	+6.7
Democratic Labor	Dominique Droulers	604	2.6	+2.6
Independent	Martin Smith	341	1.4	+1.4
Total formal votes		23,627	95.7	
Informal votes		1,055	4.3	
Turnout		24,682	86.5	
Two-party-preferred result
Labor	Syd Einfeld	13,322	56.4	−2.2
Liberal	Hans Dreyer	10,305	43.6	+2.2
Labor hold		Swing	−2.2	

=== Wentworthville ===
1973 New South Wales state election: Wentworthville
Party	Candidate	Votes	%	±%
Labor	Ernie Quinn	16,686	55.5	−5.3
Liberal	Edward Roberts	11,133	37.0	−2.2
Independent	Ian Purdie	2,267	7.5	+7.5
Total formal votes		30,086	96.8	
Informal votes		984	3.2	
Turnout		31,070	92.9	
Two-party-preferred result
Labor	Ernie Quinn	18,080	60.1	−0.7
Liberal	Edward Roberts	12,006	39.9	+0.7
Labor hold		Swing	−0.7	

=== Willoughby ===
1973 New South Wales state election: Willoughby
Party	Candidate	Votes	%	±%
Liberal	Laurie McGinty	16,322	61.1	+4.5
Labor	Alwynne Pengelly	6,471	24.2	−3.9
Australia	Mary McNish	2,574	9.6	+1.4
Democratic Labor	Reginald Lawson	1,333	5.0	+1.4
Total formal votes		26,700	97.4	
Informal votes		723	2.6	
Turnout		27,423	90.5	
Two-party-preferred result
Liberal	Laurie McGinty	18,500	69.3	+4.5
Labor	Alwynne Pengelly	8,200	30.7	−4.5
Liberal hold		Swing	+4.5	

=== Wollondilly ===
1973 New South Wales state election: Wollondilly
Party	Candidate	Votes	%	±%
Liberal	Tom Lewis	13,426	55.3	−0.4
Labor	Bill Knott	7,582	31.2	−5.0
Independent	Dianne Allen	1,714	7.1	+7.1
Australia	Jill Kerr	1,007	4.2	+4.2
Democratic Labor	Bernard McRae	554	2.3	−1.8
Total formal votes		24,283	98.3	
Informal votes		415	1.7	
Turnout		24,698	92.3	
Two-party-preferred result
Liberal	Tom Lewis	15,055	62.0	+1.0
Labor	Bill Knott	9,228	38.0	−1.0
Liberal hold		Swing	+1.0	

=== Wollongong ===
1973 New South Wales state election: Wollongong
Party	Candidate	Votes	%	±%
Labor	Eric Ramsay	17,022	61.8	
Liberal	Ian Brown	9,613	34.9	
Democratic Labor	Raymond Proust	924	3.4	
Total formal votes		27,559	96.2	
Informal votes		1,090	3.8	
Turnout		28,649	92.6	
Two-party-preferred result
Labor	Eric Ramsay	17,207	62.4	+3.6
Liberal	Ian Brown	10,352	37.6	−3.6
Labor hold		Swing	+3.6	

=== Woronora ===
1973 New South Wales state election: Woronora
Party	Candidate	Votes	%	±%
Labor	Maurie Keane	12,747	45.6	
Liberal	Evelyn Thompson	10,261	36.7	
Independent	Jean Manuel	2,816	10.1	
Independent	Walter Skarschewski	1,337	4.8	
Democratic Labor	William Goslett	801	2.9	
Total formal votes		27,962	97.3	
Informal votes		761	2.7	
Turnout		28,723	92.3	
Two-party-preferred result
Labor	Maurie Keane	14,586	52.2	−3.5
Liberal	Evelyn Thompson	13,376	47.8	+3.5
Labor hold		Swing	−3.5	

=== Yaralla ===
1973 New South Wales state election: Yaralla
Party	Candidate	Votes	%	±%
Liberal	Lerryn Mutton	14,924	53.8	+3.0
Labor	Derek Margerison	10,703	38.6	−3.5
Democratic Labor	Terence McCormack	2,107	7.6	+0.5
Total formal votes		27,734	97.7	
Informal votes		652	2.3	
Turnout		28,386	91.1	
Two-party-preferred result
Liberal	Lerryn Mutton	16,590	59.8	+3.6
Labor	Derek Margerison	11,144	40.2	−3.6
Liberal hold		Swing	+3.6	

=== Young ===
1973 New South Wales state election: Young
Party	Candidate	Votes	%	±%
Country	George Freudenstein	11,671	57.4	+9.0
Labor	Kenneth Gunn	7,887	38.8	−6.1
Democratic Labor	John Hawkins	764	3.8	−2.9
Total formal votes		20,322	99.2	
Informal votes		161	0.8	
Turnout		20,483	95.1	
Two-party-preferred result
Country	George Freudenstein	12,282	60.4	+6.6
Labor	Kenneth Gunn	8,040	39.6	−6.6
Country hold		Swing	+6.6	

== See also ==
- Candidates of the 1973 New South Wales state election
- Members of the New South Wales Legislative Assembly, 1973–1976
