= Electoral results for the district of Peats =

Election results for Peats, New South Wales, Australia

Peats, an electoral district of the Legislative Assembly in the Australian state of New South Wales, existed from 1973 until its abolition in 2007 and was always held by the Labor party.

== Members ==
Election	Member	Party
1973	Keith O'Connell	Labor
1976	Keith O'Connell	Labor
1978	Keith O'Connell	Labor
1981	Keith O'Connell	Labor
1984	Keith O'Connell	Labor
1984	Paul Landa	Labor
1985 by	Tony Doyle	Labor
1988	Tony Doyle	Labor
1991	Tony Doyle	Labor
1995	Marie Andrews	Labor
1999	Marie Andrews	Labor
2003	Marie Andrews	Labor

== Election results ==
=== Elections in the 2000s ===
==== 2003 ====
2003 New South Wales state election: Peats
Party	Candidate	Votes	%	±%
Labor	Marie Andrews	18,180	43.9	−6.0
Liberal	Debra Wales	11,620	28.1	−3.2
Independent	Chris Holstein	7,582	18.3	+18.3
Greens	Vicki Brooke	2,028	4.9	+2.0
Against Further Immigration	John Goldsmith	643	1.6	+0.5
Independent	Peter Moore	547	1.3	+1.3
Save Our Suburbs	Mark Ellis	513	1.2	+1.2
Democrats	Geoff Ward	306	0.7	−3.2
Total formal votes		41,419	97.8	+0.3
Informal votes		936	2.2	−0.3
Turnout		42,355	93.2	
Two-party-preferred result
Labor	Marie Andrews	21,181	59.7	−1.6
Liberal	Debra Wales	14,289	40.3	+1.6
Labor hold		Swing	−1.6	

=== Elections in the 1990s ===
==== 1999 ====
1999 New South Wales state election: Peats
Party	Candidate	Votes	%	±%
Labor	Marie Andrews	20,451	49.9	−2.3
Liberal	Debra Wales	12,803	31,3	−7.4
One Nation	Jeffrey Prest	2,767	6.8	+6.8
Democrats	Geoff Preece	1,598	3.9	+3.9
Greens	Stephen Lacey	1,194	2.9	+2.9
Christian Democrats	Sue Spencer	1,104	2.7	+2.7
Against Further Immigration	Ian King	461	1.1	+1.1
Earthsave	Norm Purcival	372	0.9	+0.9
Unity	Xiong Guo	193	0.5	+0.5
Total formal votes		40,943	97.5	+2.5
Informal votes		1,040	2.5	−2.5
Turnout		41,983	94.2	
Two-party-preferred result
Labor	Marie Andrews	22,397	61.3	+3.6
Liberal	Debra Wales	14,114	38.7	−3.6
Labor hold		Swing	+3.6	

==== 1995 ====
1995 New South Wales state election: Peats
Party	Candidate	Votes	%	±%
Labor	Marie Andrews	18,788	52.7	−2.3
Liberal	Thomas Bojanic	13,491	37.8	+5.2
Independent	Bryan Ellis	3,401	9.5	+9.5
Total formal votes		35,680	95.2	+3.1
Informal votes		1,816	4.8	−3.1
Turnout		37,496	94.8	
Two-party-preferred result
Labor	Marie Andrews	20,131	58.4	−2.6
Liberal	Thomas Bojanic	14,329	41.6	+2.6
Labor hold		Swing	−2.6	

==== 1991 ====
1991 New South Wales state election: Peats
Party	Candidate	Votes	%	±%
Labor	Tony Doyle	17,690	54.9	+6.1
Liberal	Keith Lavers	10,490	32.6	−1.8
Independent	Pat Harrison	2,579	8.0	−8.8
Democrats	Merv Howlett	1,445	4.5	+4.5
Total formal votes		32,204	92.1	−5.0
Informal votes		2,776	7.9	+5.0
Turnout		34,980	94.8	
Two-party-preferred result
Labor	Tony Doyle	19,040	61.0	+3.7
Liberal	Keith Lavers	12,150	39.0	−3.7
Labor hold		Swing	+3.7	

=== Elections in the 1980s ===
==== 1988 ====
1988 New South Wales state election: Peats
Party	Candidate	Votes	%	±%
Labor	Tony Doyle	15,223	48.8	−11.6
Liberal	Dennis Swadling	10,568	33.9	+1.2
Independent	Patricia Harrison	5,378	17.3	+17.3
Total formal votes		31,169	97.1	−1.1
Informal votes		942	2.9	+1.1
Turnout		32,111	94.9	
Two-party-preferred result
Labor	Tony Doyle	16,894	57.5	−6.4
Liberal	Dennis Swadling	12,462	42.5	+6.4
Labor hold		Swing	−6.4	

==== 1985 by-election ====
1985 Peats by-election Saturday 2 February
Party	Candidate	Votes	%	±%
Labor	Tony Doyle	14,382	48.9	−10.8
Liberal	Peter Walsh	12,068	41.1	+7.7
Independent	Keith Whitfield	1,533	5.2	
Democrats	John Aitken	1,411	4.8	−2.1
Total formal votes		29,394	98.9	
Informal votes		315	1.1	
Turnout		29,709	88.0	
Labor hold		Swing		

Paul Landa (Labor) died.

==== 1984 ====
1984 New South Wales state election: Peats
Party	Candidate	Votes	%	±%
Labor	Paul Landa	17,789	59.7	−4.8
Liberal	Jim Lloyd	9,959	33.4	+8.4
Democrats	John Aitken	2,065	6.9	−3.6
Total formal votes		29,813	98.2	+1.9
Informal votes		539	1.8	−1.9
Turnout		30,352	93.3	+2.0
Two-party-preferred result
Labor	Paul Landa		63.2	−7.2
Liberal	Jim Lloyd		36.8	+7.2
Labor hold		Swing	−7.2	

==== 1981 ====
1981 New South Wales state election: Peats
Party	Candidate	Votes	%	±%
Labor	Keith O'Connell	18,046	64.5	−3.8
Liberal	Raymond Carter	7,014	25.0	+0.7
Democrats	John Aitken	2,937	10.5	+7.2
Total formal votes		27,997	96.3	
Informal votes		1,082	3.7	
Turnout		29,079	91.3	
Two-party-preferred result
Labor	Keith O'Connell	19,060	70.4	−0.4
Liberal	Raymond Carter	8,014	29.6	+0.4
Labor hold		Swing	−0.4	

=== Elections in the 1970s ===
==== 1978 ====
1978 New South Wales state election: Peats
Party	Candidate	Votes	%	±%
Labor	Keith O'Connell	24,692	68.3	+9.6
Liberal	Robert Hanington	8,788	24.3	−17.0
Independent	Barry Phillips	1,489	4.1	+4.1
Democrats	Ray Griffiths	1,174	3.3	+3.3
Total formal votes		36,143	97.8	−0.5
Informal votes		795	2.2	+0.5
Turnout		36,938	93.5	−1.1
Two-party-preferred result
Labor	Keith O'Connell	25,578	70.8	+12.1
Liberal	Robert Hanington	10,565	29.2	−12.1
Labor hold		Swing	+12.1	

==== 1976 ====
1976 New South Wales state election: Peats
Party	Candidate	Votes	%	±%
Labor	Keith O'Connell	19,289	58.7	+1.4
Liberal	Peter Walsh	13,579	41.3	−1.4
Total formal votes		32,868	98.3	+0.5
Informal votes		556	1.7	−0.5
Turnout		33,424	94.6	+1.2
Labor hold		Swing	+1.4	

==== 1973 ====
1973 New South Wales state election: Peats
Party	Candidate	Votes	%	±%
Labor	Keith O'Connell	15,948	57.3	−1.5
Liberal	Graeme Hallett	11,886	42.7	+1.5
Total formal votes		27,834	97.8	
Informal votes		617	2.2	
Turnout		28,451	93.4	
Labor notional hold		Swing	−1.5	

Peats was a new seat with a notional Labor majority.
