= Candidates of the 1973 New South Wales state election =

This is a list of candidates for the 1973 New South Wales state election. The election was held on 17 November 1973.

== Retiring Members ==
Note: Jack Beale MLA (Liberal, South Coast) resigned some months prior to the election. No by-election was held.

=== Labor ===
- Reg Coady MLA (Drummoyne)
- Clarrie Earl MLA (Bass Hill)
- Joe Kelly MLA (East Hills)
- Norm Ryan MLA (Marrickville)
- Bill Sheahan MLA (Burrinjuck)
- Albert Sloss MLA (King)
- Jim Southee MLA (Mount Druitt)

=== Liberal ===
- Sir Kevin Ellis MLA (Coogee)
- Harry Jago MLA (Gordon)

=== Independent ===
- Bill Chaffey MLA (Tamworth) – elected as Country

== Legislative Assembly ==
Sitting members are shown in bold text. Successful candidates are highlighted in the relevant colour. Where there is possible confusion, an asterisk (*) is also used.

Electorate	Held by	Labor candidate	Coalition candidate	DLP candidate	Other candidates
Albury	Liberal	Gordon Mitchell	**Gordon Mackie** (Lib)	Anthony Quinn	
Armidale	Country	Judith Waters	**David Leitch** (CP)	Peter McRae	
Ashfield	Liberal	Bede Spillane	**David Hunter** (Lib)	Mary Burton	John Jordan (AP)
Auburn	Labor	**Peter Cox**	Arthur Deane (Lib)	Christopher Carroll	
Balmain	Labor	**Roger Degen**		Gary Doherty	Rosemary Smith (AP)
Bankstown	Labor	**Nick Kearns**	John Ghent (Lib)	Joseph Sanders	
Barwon	Country		**Geoff Crawford** (CP)		Graham Gifford (AP)
Bass Hill	Labor	Neville Wran	Raymond Clark-Smith (Lib)		
Bathurst	Country	Maxwell Hanrahan	**Clive Osborne** (CP)	John O'Grady	
Blacktown	Labor	**Gordon Barnier**	John Lyon (Lib)	Stan Aster-Slater	Ivor F (Ind); George Perrin (Ind)
Bligh	Liberal		**John Barraclough** (Lib)	Monica Quigley	Julia Featherstone (AP)
Blue Mountains	Independent	Mick Clough		Joseph Conroy	**Harold Coates** (Ind)
Broken Hill	Labor	**Lew Johnstone**			
Burrendong	Labor	**Leo Nott**	Beryl Bowman (Lib); Roger Wotton* (CP)		
Burrinjuck	Labor	Terry Sheahan	James Brooks (CP); Leon Garry (Lib); Edward O'Connor (CP)	John Roche	
Burwood	Liberal	Phil O'Neill	**John Jackett** (Lib)	Agnes Bannon	
Byron	Country	James Constable	**Jack Boyd** (CP)		Brian Halesworth (AP)
Campbelltown	Labor	**Cliff Mallam**	John Marsden (Lib)	Francis Bulger	Elizabeth Bye (Ind)
Canterbury	Labor	**Kevin Stewart**	Jack Backer (Lib)	John George	
Casino	Labor	**Don Day**	Donald McRae (CP); Owen Wainwright (CP)		Clifford Hirst (Ind)
Castlereagh	Labor	**Jack Renshaw**	Lionel Gray (Lib); Albert Green (CP)		
Cessnock	Labor	**George Neilly**		Bernard Burke	
Charlestown	Labor	**Richard Face**	Paul Clarkson (Lib)	Ignatius Philippa	John Steele (AP)
Clarence	Country	Patricia Oakman	**Matt Singleton** (CP)	William Eckersley	Terrence Hancock (AP)
Coogee	Liberal	Michael Cleary	Ross Freeman (Lib)	Betty Stepkovitch	Ann Sutherland (AP)
Corrimal	Labor	**Laurie Kelly**	Robert Law (Lib)	Peter Daly	Susan Healy (AP)
Cronulla	Liberal	Michael Egan	**Ian Griffith** (Lib)	Bernard Forshaw	Marjory Gray (AP)
Davidson	Liberal	Walter Willington	**Dick Healey** (Lib)	Thomas Colman	Veronica Carey (AP)
Drummoyne	Labor	Michael Maher	Brian Barber (Lib)	Vincent Abrams	
Dubbo	Liberal	Emily Renshaw	**John Mason** (Lib)	Michael Stephens	
Earlwood	Labor	Colin Williams	**Eric Willis** (Lib)	Doris Allison	Alexander Paterson (AP)
East Hills	Labor	Pat Rogan	John Edwards (Lib)	John Anderson	Robert Walsh (AP)
Eastwood	Liberal		**Jim Clough** (Lib)	Paul Burton	John Butterworth (AP)
Fairfield	Labor	**Eric Bedford**	Domenic Pangallo (Lib)	Maurice George	Robert Tuckwell (AP)
Fuller	Liberal	William Waters	**Peter Coleman** (Lib)	Timothy Abrams	Philip Arantz (Ind); Jean Braithwaite (AP)
Georges River	Labor	**Frank Walker**	Roderick MacKenzie (Lib)	Charles Kane	Kenneth Cavanough (Ind); Peter Eden (AP)
Gloucester	Country	Terence Wallis	**Leon Punch** (CP)	Jack Collins	
Gordon	Liberal	Miron Shapira		Kevin Harrold	
Gosford	Liberal	Brian McGowan	Malcolm Brooks (Lib)	William Dunbar	
Goulburn	Country	Noel Lane	**Ron Brewer** (CP)	Raymond Albrighton	Evan Treharne (Ind)
Granville	Labor	**Pat Flaherty**	John Newland (Lib)	Terrence Luthy	
Hawkesbury	Liberal	Peter Stone	**Kevin Rozzoli** (Lib)	Emma Ekman	Peter Knowland (AP); John McMahon (Ind)
Heathcote	Labor	**Rex Jackson**	Philip Benwell (Lib)	Margaret Silva	Norman Tonkin (Ind)
Heffron	Labor	Laurie Brereton		Paul Evans	Peter Clark (AP)
Hornsby	Liberal	Brian Silva	Neil Pickard (Lib)	Cecil Wallace	
Hurstville	Liberal	Kevin Ryan	**Tom Mead** (Lib)	Anthony Young	Paul Flottmann (Ind)
Illawarra	Labor	**George Petersen**		Everardus Himmelreich	
Kirribilli	Liberal	Irene Anderson	**John Waddy** (Lib)	Margaret Colman	
Kogarah	Labor	**Bill Crabtree**	Edward Griffiths (Lib)	Harold Rich	
Ku-ring-gai	Liberal	Ian Cameron	**John Maddison** (Lib)	Norma Boyle	
Lake Macquarie	Labor	**Merv Hunter**		Donald Richards	Colin Fisher (Ind)
Lakemba	Labor	**Vince Durick**	Philip Gregory (Lib)	Anthony Hook	Douglas Morgan (Ind)
Lane Cove	Liberal	Robert Toner	**Ken McCaw** (Lib)	Francis Hernage	Malcolm Hilbery (AP); Gregory Lewis (Ind); Peter Livesey (Ind)
Lismore	Country	Frederick Braid	**Bruce Duncan** (CP)	William Hunt	William Hargrave (Ind)
Liverpool	Labor	**George Paciullo**	Richard Lennon (Lib)	Doris Brown	
Maitland	Liberal	George Lyons	**Milton Morris** (Lib)	Reginald Hughes	
Manly	Liberal	Allan Hughes	**Douglas Darby** (Lib)	Bernard Fox	John Alexander (AP)
Maroubra	Labor	**Bill Haigh**	Ronald Burkitt (Lib)	John Martin	Norwood Hartley (AP)
Marrickville	Labor	**Tom Cahill**	George Lamont (Lib)	Anthony Kiely	
Merrylands	Labor	**Jack Ferguson**	Garry Dent (Lib)		Geoffrey Thomas (AP)
Miranda	Liberal	John Brookfield	**Tim Walker** (Lib)	Bill Casey	Neva Wendt (AP)
Monaro	Liberal	Margaret Gleeson	**Steve Mauger** (Lib)	Gerald O'Shaughnessy	
Mosman	Liberal		**David Arblaster** (Lib)	Peter Keogh	Allan Mann (AP)
Mount Druitt	Labor	Tony Johnson	Neiven Harrison (Lib)	Francesco Rea	Patrick Chalker (Ind)
Munmorah	Labor	**Harry Jensen**	William Jackson (Lib)	Raymond Connolly	
Murray	Liberal	Douglas Drew	**Mary Meillon** (Lib)	Brian Maw	Gregory Graham (Ind); Bruce Jeffery (Ind); Kevin Lowndes (Ind)
Murrumbidgee	Labor	**Lin Gordon**	Donald Mackay (Lib); Bernardino Zappacosta (CP)	John Hagan	
Nepean	Liberal	Kathleen Tucker	Ron Rofe (Lib)	David Sanson	John Allan (Ind); Maurice Sharp (Ind); Gregory Woodward (Ind)
Newcastle	Labor	**Arthur Wade**	Richard Bevan (Lib)	Charin Godfrey	Peter Baldwin (AP)
Northcott	Liberal		**Jim Cameron** (Lib)	Michael Kane	Vivienne Berzin (AP); Franciscus Leechburch-Auwers (RPA)
Orange	Country	Joseph Ryan	**Sir Charles Cutler** (CP)	Robert Hansen	
Oxley	Country	Bruce Langford	**Bruce Cowan** (CP)	Gary Phillips	
Parramatta	Labor	**Dan Mahoney**	Hilton Robinson (Lib)	Mary Woodbury	
Peats	Labor	**Keith O'Connell**	Graeme Hallett (Lib)		
Penrith	Labor	**Ron Mulock**	Eileen Cammack (Lib)		Joseph Stein (Ind)
Phillip	Labor	**Pat Hills**	Walter O'Donoghue (Lib)	Kristina Aster-Stater	Jennifer Baker (AP); John Hawkins (Ind); Joseph Owens (CPA)
Pittwater	Liberal	Dorothy Jeffery	**Sir Robert Askin** (Lib)	Kevin Lee	
Raleigh	Country	Ken Reed	**Jim Brown** (CP)		
Rockdale	Labor	**Brian Bannon**	Kenneth Gates (Lib)	Alan Lewis	
South Coast	Liberal		Alexander Cochrane (CP); Basil Emery (CP); Doug Otton (Lib)		Robert Burke (Ind); Robert Coburn (Ind); John Hatton* (Ind)
Sturt	Country	John Foley	**Tim Fischer** (CP)	Joseph Lenehan	
Tamworth	Country	William Bischoff; William Forrest	Noel Park* (CP); Neil Roberts (Lib)	Peter Young	Joan Byrne (AP); Leonard Hill (Ind)
Temora	Country	Alroy Provan	**Jim Taylor** (CP)	Terence Brady	Donald Douglas (Ind)
Tenterfield	Country	Alice Clifford	**Tim Bruxner** (CP)		
The Hills	Liberal	Judith Mackinolty	**Max Ruddock** (Lib)	John Woulfe	
Upper Hunter	Country	Kenneth Cosgrove	**Col Fisher** (CP)	Kathleen Buckingham	
Vaucluse	Liberal		**Keith Doyle** (Lib)	Doris Anderson	Brian Hickey (AP)
Wagga Wagga	Liberal	Kenneth Fletcher	**Wal Fife** (Lib)	Kevin Murphy	Pamela Osmond (AP)
Wakehurst	Liberal	Colin McIlwraith	**Allan Viney** (Lib)	Terrence Fay	Pamela Wilson (AP)
Wallsend	Labor	**Ken Booth**		Robert Godfrey	Desmond Kynaston (AP)
Waratah	Labor	**Sam Jones**		Anne McCosker	George Wawryck (Rep)
Waverley	Labor	**Syd Einfeld**	Hans Dreyer (Lib)	Dominique Droulers	Martin Smith (Ind); Virginia Walker (AP)
Wentworthville	Labor	**Ernie Quinn**	Edward Roberts (Lib)		Ian Purdie (Ind)
Willoughby	Liberal	Alwynne Pengelly	**Laurie McGinty** (Lib)	Reginald Lawson	Mary McNish (AP)
Wollondilly	Liberal	Bill Knott	**Tom Lewis** (Lib)	Bernard McRae	Dianne Allen (Ind); Jill Kerr (AP)
Wollongong	Labor	**Eric Ramsay**	Ian Brown (Lib)	Raymond Proust	
Woronora	Labor	Maurie Keane	Evelyn Thompson (Lib)	William Goslett	Jean Manuel (Ind); Walter Skarschewski (Ind)
Yaralla	Liberal	Derek Margerison	**Lerryn Mutton** (Lib)	Terence McCormack	
Young	Country	Kenneth Gunn	**George Freudenstein** (CP)	John Hawkins	

== See also ==
- Members of the New South Wales Legislative Assembly, 1973–1976
- Members of the New South Wales Legislative Council, 1973–1976
