= 1985 Peats state by-election =

Election result for Peats, New South Wales, Australia

A by-election was held for the New South Wales Legislative Assembly electorate of Peats on 2 February 1985 because of the death of Paul Landa (Labor).

The Peats by-election was held the same day as the Murray by-election.

== Dates ==
Date	Event
24 November 1984	Paul Landa died.
3 January 1985	Writ of election issued by the Speaker of the Legislative Assembly and close of electoral rolls.
10 January 1985	Nominations
2 February 1985	Polling day
22 February 1985	Return of writ

== Result ==
1985 Peats by-election Saturday 2 February
Party	Candidate	Votes	%	±%
Labor	Tony Doyle	14,382	48.9	−10.8
Liberal	Peter Walsh	12,068	41.1	+7.7
Independent	Keith Whitfield	1,533	5.2	
Democrats	John Aitken	1,411	4.8	−2.1
Total formal votes		29,394	98.9	
Informal votes		315	1.1	
Turnout		29,709	88.0	
Labor hold		Swing		

== See also ==
- Electoral results for the district of Peats
- List of New South Wales state by-elections
