= Electoral results for the district of Terrigal =

Australian district election results

Terrigal is an electoral district of the Legislative Assembly in the Australian state of New South Wales, was created in 2007, with much of the electorate previously being part of Gosford.

== Members for Terrigal ==
Election	Member	Party
2007	Chris Hartcher	Liberal
2011	Chris Hartcher	Liberal
2015	Adam Crouch	Liberal
2019	Adam Crouch	Liberal
2023	Adam Crouch	Liberal

== Election results ==
=== Elections in the 2020s ===
==== 2023 ====
2023 New South Wales state election: Terrigal
Party	Candidate	Votes	%	±%
Liberal	Adam Crouch	23,507	46.6	−6.3
Labor	Sam Boughton	19,703	39.0	+12.9
Greens	Imogen da Silva	4,868	9.6	−0.4
Sustainable Australia	Wayne Rigg	2,392	4.7	+2.8
Total formal votes		50,470	97.5	+0.8
Informal votes		1,270	2.5	−0.8
Turnout		51,740	89.1	−1.2
Two-party-preferred result
Liberal	Adam Crouch	24,467	51.2	−11.1
Labor	Sam Boughton	23,300	48.8	+11.1
Liberal hold		Swing	−11.1	

=== Elections in the 2010s ===
==== 2019 ====
2019 New South Wales state election: Terrigal
Party	Candidate	Votes	%	±%
Liberal	Adam Crouch	26,580	52.86	+1.10
Labor	Jeff Sundstrom	13,134	26.12	−5.26
Greens	Bob Doyle	5,073	10.09	−1.74
Independent	Gary Chestnut	1,758	3.50	+3.50
Animal Justice	Flavia Coleman	1,542	3.07	+3.07
Conservatives	Ross Blaikie	1,202	2.39	+2.39
Sustainable Australia	Wayne Rigg	995	1.98	+1.98
Total formal votes		50,284	96.76	−0.02
Informal votes		1,682	3.24	+0.02
Turnout		51,966	90.37	−0.67
Two-party-preferred result
Liberal	Adam Crouch	27,802	62.34	+3.32
Labor	Jeff Sundstrom	16,794	37.66	−3.32
Liberal hold		Swing	+3.32	

==== 2015 ====
2015 New South Wales state election: Terrigal
Party	Candidate	Votes	%	±%
Liberal	Adam Crouch	25,297	51.8	−8.7
Labor	Jeff Sundstrom	15,338	31.4	+13.2
Greens	Doug Williamson	5,782	11.8	−1.6
Christian Democrats	Murray Byrnes	1,564	3.2	+0.2
No Land Tax	Nadia Ruben	894	1.8	+1.8
Total formal votes		48,875	96.8	+0.0
Informal votes		1,626	3.2	−0.0
Turnout		50,501	91.0	+0.8
Two-party-preferred result
Liberal	Adam Crouch	26,526	59.0	−14.6
Labor	Jeff Sundstrom	18,420	41.0	+14.6
Liberal hold		Swing	−14.6	

==== 2011 ====
2011 New South Wales state election: Terrigal
Party	Candidate	Votes	%	±%
Liberal	Chris Hartcher	26,737	61.0	+11.1
Labor	Trevor Drake	7,790	17.8	−16.2
Greens	Dougal Anderson	5,927	13.5	+4.9
United We Stand	Michelle Meares	1,414	3.2	+3.2
Christian Democrats	Carmen Darley-Bentley	1,289	2.9	−0.1
Independent	Ian Sutton	698	1.6	+1.6
Total formal votes		43,855	97.3	−0.5
Informal votes		1,223	2.7	+0.5
Turnout		45,078	92.7	
Two-party-preferred result
Liberal	Chris Hartcher	28,433	74.1	+15.7
Labor	Trevor Drake	9,913	25.9	−15.7
Liberal hold		Swing	+15.7	

=== Elections in the 2000s ===
==== 2007 ====
2007 New South Wales state election: Terrigal
Party	Candidate	Votes	%	±%
Liberal	Chris Hartcher	20,857	49.9	+3.6
Labor	Deborah O'Neill	14,211	34.0	−8.7
Greens	Terry Jones	3,595	8.6	+1.3
Christian Democrats	Mark McAllan	1,272	3.0	+2.8
Against Further Immigration	Kay Hayes	915	2.2	+2.1
Outdoor Recreation	David Begg	501	1.2	+1.2
Save Our Suburbs	Mark Ellis	435	1.0	−0.3
Total formal votes		41,786	97.8	−0.4
Informal votes		942	2.2	+0.4
Turnout		42,728	93.3	
Two-party-preferred result
Liberal	Chris Hartcher	22,374	58.4	+7.8
Labor	Deborah O'Neill	15,907	41.6	−7.8
Liberal notional hold		Swing	+7.8	
