= 2017 Gosford state by-election =

Election result for Gosford, New South Wales, Australia

- 8 April 2017
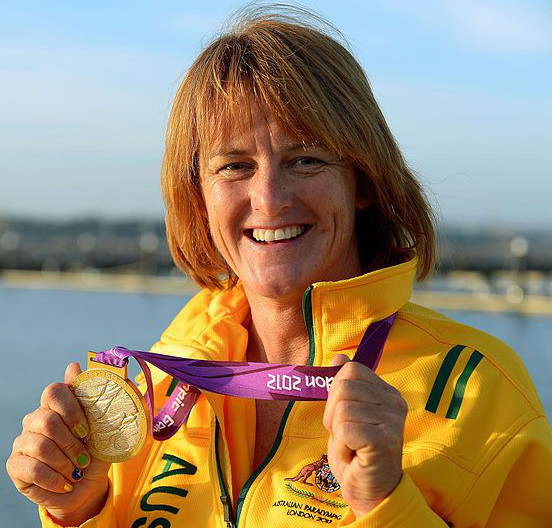

	First party	Second party
Candidate	Liesl Tesch	Jilly Pilon
Party	Labor	Liberal
Popular vote	22,931	14,208
Percentage	49.5%	30.7%
Swing	▲10.9pp	▼11.9pp
TPP	62.5%	37.5%
TPP swing	▲12.3pp	▼12.3pp
MP before election
Kathy Smith
Labor
Elected MP
Liesl Tesch
Labor

A by-election was held in the state electoral district of Gosford on 8 April 2017. The by-election was triggered by the resignation of Kathy Smith (Labor) due to ill health. It was held on the same day as the North Shore and Manly state by-elections.

== Dates ==
Date	Event
17 March 2017	Writ of election issued by the Speaker and close of electoral rolls
Noon, 22 March 2017	Close of nominations for party-endorsed candidates
Noon, 23 March 2017	Close of nominations for other candidates
8 April 2017	Polling day, between the hours of 8 am and 6 pm

== Candidates ==
The candidates in ballot paper order were as follows:

Candidate nominations
Party	Candidate	Notes (not on ballot paper)
Greens	Abigail Boyd	Financial lawyer
Christian Democratic Party (Fred Nile Group)	Andrew Church	Gosford City Citizen of the Year 2016 and businessman
Animal Justice Party	Skyla Wagstaff	
Labor Party	Liesl Tesch	Paralympian and local teacher. Former federal MP Belinda Neal had expressed interest in running as a candidate; however, a preselection ballot was not held.
Shooters, Fishers and Farmers Party	Larry Freeman	Council worker
Liberal Party	Jilly Pilon	Businesswoman. She attracted criticism for residing in the adjoining electorate of Terrigal instead of Gosford.

== Results ==
2017 Gosford by-election Saturday 8 April
Party	Candidate	Votes	%	±%
Labor	Liesl Tesch	22,931	49.5	+10.9
Liberal	Jilly Pilon	14,208	30.7	−11.9
Greens	Abigail Boyd	3,454	7.5	−1.5
Shooters, Fishers, Farmers	Larry Freeman	2,378	5.1	+5.1
Animal Justice	Skyla Wagstaff	1,841	4.0	+4.0
Christian Democrats	Andrew Church	1,475	3.2	+0.9
Total formal votes		46,287	97.3	+0.5
Informal votes		1,285	2.7	−0.5
Turnout		47,572	85.0	−5.6
Two-party-preferred result
Labor	Liesl Tesch	26,440	62.5	+12.3
Liberal	Jilly Pilon	15,853	37.5	−12.3
Labor hold		Swing	+12.3	

== See also ==
- Electoral results for the district of Gosford
- List of New South Wales state by-elections
