= Harold Jackson (politician) =

Australian politician

Harold Ernest Jackson (12 November 1902 – 24 June 1980) was an Australian politician, elected as a member of the New South Wales Legislative Assembly representing the seat of Gosford between 1950 and 1965.

== Notes ==
New South Wales Legislative Assembly
Preceded by New seat	Member for Gosford; 1950–1965	Succeeded by Ted Humphries
