= Chris Hartcher =

Australian politician

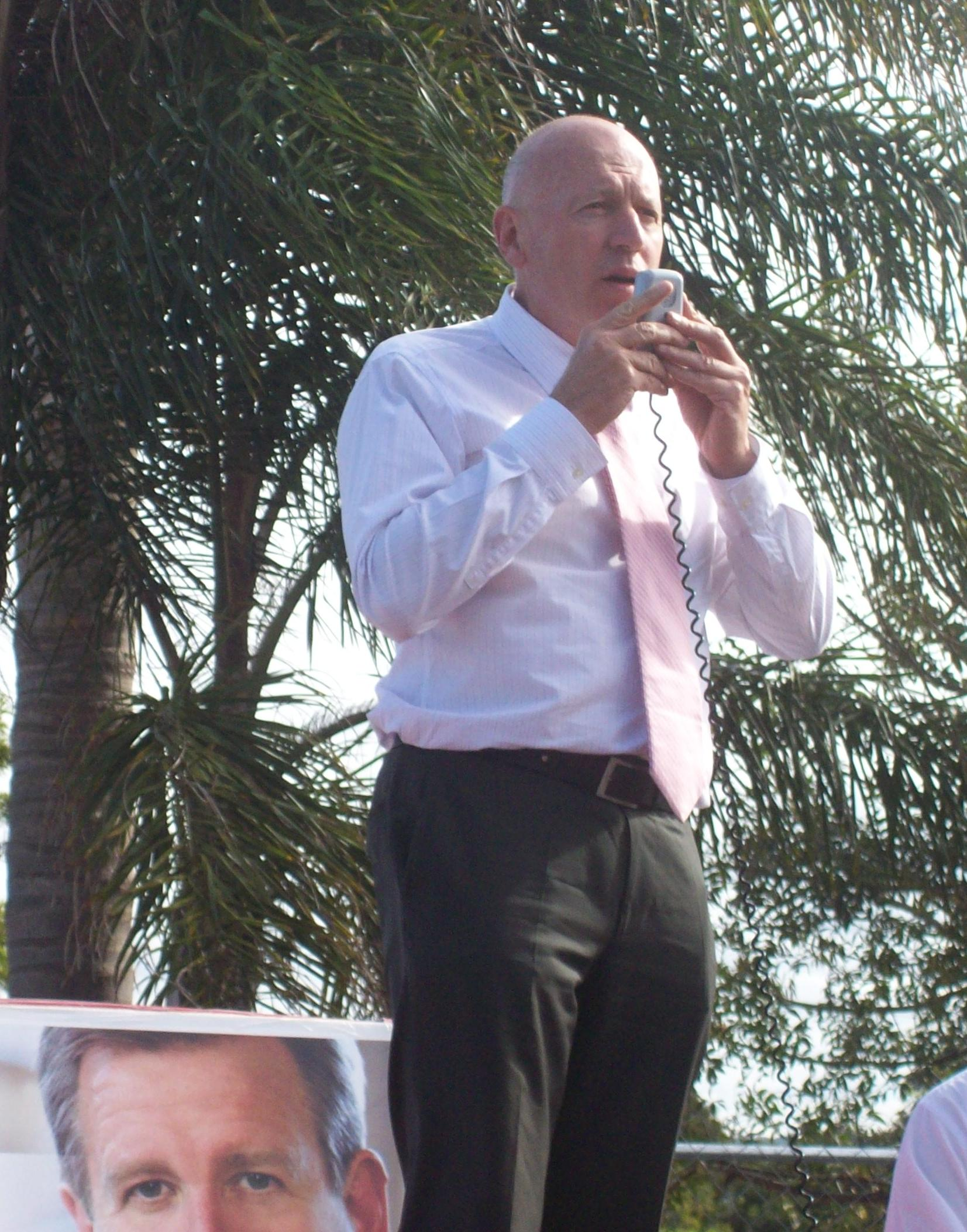
- Hartcher in 2010

Minister for Resources and Energy
- In office 3 April 2011 – 4 December 2013
- Premier: Barry O'Farrell
- Preceded by: Paul Lynch
- Succeeded by: Anthony Roberts

Special Minister of State
- In office 3 April 2011 – 4 December 2013
- Preceded by: Eric Roozendaal
- Succeeded by: Anthony Roberts

Minister for the Central Coast
- In office 3 April 2011 – 4 December 2013
- Preceded by: John Robertson
- Succeeded by: Michael Gallacher

Member of the New South Wales Parliament for Terrigal
- In office 24 March 2007 – 6 March 2015
- Preceded by: New district
- Succeeded by: Adam Crouch

Member of the New South Wales Parliament for Gosford
- In office 19 March 1988 – 24 March 2007
- Preceded by: Brian McGowan
- Succeeded by: Marie Andrews

Personal details
- Born: 21 December 1946 (age 79) North Sydney, New South Wales, Australia
- Party: Independent (2013–present)
- Other political affiliations: Liberals (1988–2013)
- Profession: Solicitor

Christopher Peter Hartcher (born 21 December 1946) is an Australian politician. He was a member of the New South Wales Legislative Assembly from 1988 to 2015, representing the electorates of Gosford (1988–2007) and Terrigal (2007–2015). He represented the Liberal Party for most of his career, serving as its deputy state leader from 2002 to 2003, and in the O'Farrell Ministry as minister for resources and energy, special minister of state and minister for the Central Coast. In 2013, he resigned to sit as an independent following his implication in an ongoing Independent Commission Against Corruption inquiry, and retired at the 2015 state election.

== Early life ==
Hartcher was born in North Sydney and was educated at Saint Ignatius' College, Riverview. He received a Bachelor of Arts and a Bachelor of Laws from the University of Sydney. He then worked as a personal injury and family law solicitor employed by his uncle.

== Political career ==
Hartcher was elected to represent Gosford for the Liberal Party at the 1988 NSW state election. He was appointed Government Whip in 1991 and served in that role until 1992. On 3 July 1992, Hartcher was appointed to the NSW Cabinet as Minister for the Environment and left the Cabinet with the defeat of the Fahey Government in March 1995.

=== NSW Opposition ===
After the 1995 election, Hartcher was appointed to a number of shadow ministerial portfolios, spending a combined eight years as Shadow Minister for Industrial Relations, five years as Shadow Attorney General, and three years as Shadow Minister for 2000 Olympic Games.

On 28 March 2002 he was elected as deputy opposition leader under John Brogden until the 2003 state election. Former premier Bob Carr was often Hartcher's political "sparring partner", a relationship Carr referred to as "good natured fun". Carr nicknamed Hartcher the Swamp Fox – an irreverent reference to US War of Independence guerrilla commander, Francis Marion – to suggest Hartcher would challenge Brogden for leadership of the party.

At the 2003 election Hartcher was challenged in the seat of Gosford by Labor candidate Deborah O'Neill and won by only 272 votes. After narrowly retaining Gosford, Hartcher decided to step down as Deputy Liberal Leader.

In 2006, New South Wales Legislative Assembly seats were subject to an electoral redistribution. The seat of Peats was abolished and the majority of the area was redistributed into a newly created seat of Gosford. The majority of the former seat of Gosford was redistributed into the new electoral district of Terrigal. Hartcher was again challenged by O'Neill but was elected Member for Terrigal on 24 March 2007. O'Neill was later elected as the Member for Robertson at the 2010 Federal Election.

In 2010, Hartcher was endorsed as the Liberal Party's candidate for Terrigal ahead of the 2011 election. He was elected with a swing of 11.1 points, and won the seat with 74.1 per cent of the two-party vote. His main opponent was Labor's Trevor Drake, who was a former Liberal Party Gosford City Councillor.

=== O'Farrell Government ===
On 3 April 2011, Hartcher was appointed by Premier Barry O'Farrell to the Cabinet as minister for resources and energy, special minister of state and minister for the Central Coast.

He resigned from Cabinet on 4 December 2013 after the Independent Commission Against Corruption (ICAC) raided his office. In February 2014, the ICAC commenced investigating allegations of electoral funding irregularities. In response to the inquiry, Hartcher, and fellow MPs Chris Spence and Darren Webber, stood aside from the parliamentary party, even though they had just renominated for their seats, to sit as independents. With a final report not released before the 2015 election campaign, Hartcher, Spence and Webber chose to retire and not contest the next election.

On 30 August 2016, the ICAC released its report into the investigation into illegal developer donations. It found that Hartcher had "acted with the intention of evading laws banning political donations from property developers, cap donations and requiring the disclosure of donation" and also recommended that the director of public prosecutions consider laying a charge against Hartcher of larceny. That recommendation related to a cheque for $4,000 made out to the Liberal Party as a donation, but found by ICAC to be deposited into an account controlled by Hartcher and later withdrawn in cash by Ray Carter.

== Personal life ==
Hartcher is married with three sons.

New South Wales Legislative Assembly
| Preceded by Brian McGowan | Member for Gosford; 1988–2007 | Succeeded by Marie Andrews |
| New district | Member for Terrigal; 2007–2015 | Succeeded by Adam Crouch |
Political offices
| Preceded by Bruce Baird | Minister for the Environment; 1992–1995 | Succeeded by Pam Allan |
| Preceded by Paul Lynch | Minister for Resources and Energy; 2011–2013 | Succeeded by Anthony Roberts |
| Preceded by Eric Roozendaal | Special Minister of State; 2011–2013 | Succeeded by Anthony Roberts |
| Preceded by John Robertson | Minister for the Central Coast; 2011–2013 | Succeeded by Michael Gallacher |
Party political offices
| Preceded by Barry O'Farrell | Deputy Leader of the New South Wales Liberal Party; 2002–2003 | Succeeded by Barry O'Farrell |
