= Abigail Boyd =

Member of the New South Wales Legislative Council

Abigail Boyd MLC
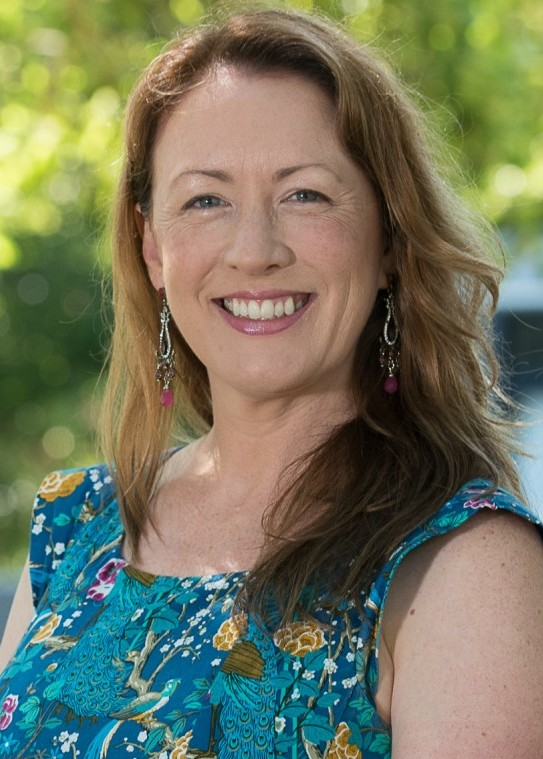

Member of the New South Wales Legislative Council
- Incumbent
- Assumed office 23 March 2019

Personal details
- Party: The Greens
- Education: Macquarie University; University of New South Wales
- Website: Official website

Abigail Selina Boyd is an Australian politician living on the Central Coast in New South Wales. She has been a member of the New South Wales Legislative Council since 2019, representing the Greens.

Boyd was a corporate lawyer specialising in global banking regulation before her election.

Boyd's areas of policy interest include climate change, economic inequality, domestic and family violence, animal welfare, disability and young people.

== Early life and career ==
Boyd was born in England and moved to Australia as a young child. She attended public schools in New South Wales, before graduating from Macquarie University in 1995 with a Bachelor of Arts (Psychology), and from the University of New South Wales in 1999 with a Bachelor of Laws. She is qualified to practise law in New South Wales, England and Wales.

Boyd worked as a solicitor at Mallesons Sydney from 1998 to 2003, at Blake Dawson Sydney from 2003 to 2004, and at Freshfields in London from 2004 to 2005. She was a Capital Products Structurer at UBS Investment Bank in London from 2005 to 2006, and then worked as a Counsel at Allen & Overy (in London and then Sydney) from 2007 to 2018. As a lawyer, Boyd's areas of expertise included global banking regulation and structured capital markets products issued by banks, insurers and corporates across Europe, Asia and Australia. She had a particular interest in financial stability and the manner in which financial crises increase economic inequality, and is a published author on the topic of bank bail-ins.

During 2008, Boyd worked on the 2008 financial crisis in London. This experience has been critical in her work on reducing economic inequality and developing a progressive economy.

== Political career ==
Boyd held various roles within the Greens before being elected to the NSW Parliament, including National Secretary of the Australian Greens (2017–18) and National Deputy Secretary of the Australian Greens (2016–17). She was the Australian Greens candidate in 2016 for the federal seat of Dobell, and the Greens NSW candidate in the 2017 Gosford state by-election.

Boyd was preselected to the second position on the Greens' upper house ticket and elected to the New South Wales Legislative Council in the 2019 New South Wales state election.

Boyd is currently the Chair of NSW Parliament's Public Accountability and Works Committee, Chair of Portfolio Committee No. 3 – Education, Deputy Chair of the Regulation Committee, Temporary Chair of Committees and a member of the Procedure Committee and the Joint Select Committee on Arts and Music Education and Training in New South Wales. She was previously Chair of Portfolio Committee No. 6 – Transport and a member of the Select Committee on the Greyhound Welfare and Integrity Commission and the Joint Select Committee on Coercive Control.

On 6 June 2019, Boyd successfully moved a motion requiring the NSW Government to produce documents related to the sale of Eraring and Vales Point power stations. Following the production of those documents, Boyd was successful in establishing an inquiry into residual costs to the NSW Government resulting from those sale arrangements.

In 2019, she fought to revoke the approvals given to the Wallarah 2 coal mine near Wyong with the Central Coast Drinking Water Catchments Protection Bill 2019. The Bill was negatived in November 2019.

In 2020, Boyd put forward a motion pushing for the "complete decarbonisation of our economy and a transition to a jobs-rich future powered by 100 percent renewable energy", done through a Just Transition framework.

In early 2020, she launched a universal basic income initiative known as the Universal Wellbeing Payment and was subsequently a keynote speaker at BIEN's 2022 conference in Brisbane.

After giving notice in June 2020, Boyd introduced the Crimes (Domestic and Personal Violence) Amendment (Coercive and Controlling Behaviour) Bill 2020 in November 2020. The Bill, which Boyd consulted on for over a year, seeks to change the law to recognise coercive control as domestic abuse.

In March 2021, Boyd put forward a motion to address sexual assault and harassment in the NSW Parliament, including requiring sexual consent training for all staff, which passed unopposed.

In 2021, she launched a campaign for a Public Bank of NSW.

Boyd has introduced bills in relation to recognising animal sentience, establishing an Independent Office of Animal Welfare, and implementing Whole-of-Life Greyhound Tracking.

In October 2023, Boyd signed an open letter which condemned attacks against Israeli and Palestinian civilians during the Gaza war.
