= 1973 New South Wales state election =

State election for New South Wales, Australia in November 1973

- 17 November 1973

All 99 seats in the New South Wales Legislative Assembly 50 Assembly seats were needed for a majority
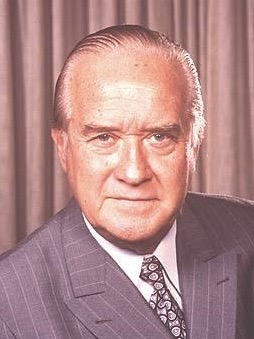

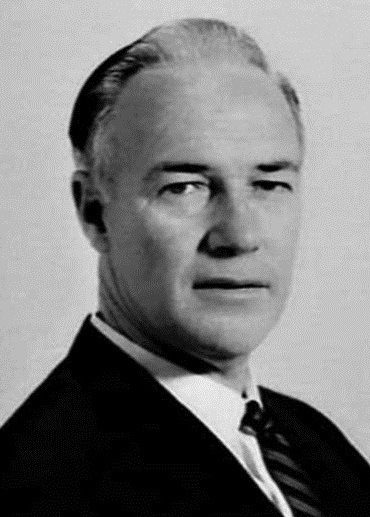
	First party	Second party
Leader	Robert Askin	Pat Hills
Party	Liberal–Country Coalition	Labor
Leader since	17 July 1959	2 December 1968
Leader's seat	Pittwater	Phillip
Last election	49 seats	45 seats
Seats won	52	44 seats
Seat change	▲3	▼1
Percentage	44.33%	42.93%
Swing	▼0.06	▼2.09
- Two-candidate-preferred margin by electorate
Premier before election
Robert Askin
Liberal–Country Coalition
Elected Premier
Robert Askin
Liberal–Country Coalition

Elections for the New South Wales Legislative Assembly were held in the state of New South Wales, Australia, on Saturday 17 November 1973. The result was a win for the Liberal-Country Party coalition under Sir Robert Askin, which had been in office since 1965. As of 2023, this was the first and only time the Coalition won a fourth-term in New South Wales.

== Issues ==
The Legislative Assembly had been enlarged by three members to 99 adding the seats of Woronora, Penrith and Ku-ring-gai.

The election was held just eleven months after the Liberal–Country coalition lost the federal election after 23 years in power. Askin called an early election to take advantage of the increasing economic issues which had been attributed to the Whitlam Labor government.

Leader of the Legislative Council Neville Wran, who would become Premier at the next election moved from the unelected Legislative Council to the Legislative Assembly after the late retirement of Clarrie Earl in the seat of Bass Hill.

== Key dates ==
Date	Event
19 October 1973	The Legislative Assembly was dissolved, and writs were issued by the Governor to proceed with an election.
25 October 1973	Nominations for candidates for the election closed at noon.
17 November 1973	Polling day, between the hours of 8am and 6pm.
3 December 1973	The sixth Askin-Cutler ministry was constituted.
4 December 1973	Parliament resumed for business.
7 December 1973	The writ was returned and the results formally declared.

== Results ==
The Democratic Labor Party won its only lower house seat at the 1973 election following the Liberal Party's incumbent for the northern Sydney seat of Gordon — Harry Jago failed to nominate in time. Conservative voters were urged to vote for the DLP candidate, Kevin Harrold.

New South Wales state election, 17 November 1973 Legislative Assembly << 1971–1976 >>
Enrolled voters	2,767,876 (Note: There were 2,788,733 enrolled voters but 20,857 were enrolled in Broken Hill (Labor) which was uncontested at the election.)				
Votes cast	2,560,653		Turnout	92.51	-0.75
Informal votes	69,225		Informal	2.70	+0.36
Summary of votes by party
Party	Primary votes	%	Swing	Seats	Change
Labor	1,069,614	42.93	–2.09	44	– 1
Liberal	843,325	33.85	–1.89	34	+ 2
Country	261,504	10.48	+1.83	18	+ 1
Democratic Labor	148,378	5.96	+2.79	1	+ 1
Australia	104,821	4.21	+3.15	0	± 0
Communist	838	0.03	–0.06	0	± 0
Independent	63,358	2.54	–3.24	2	± 0
Total	2,491,428			99	

Popular vote
Labor	42.93%
Liberal	33.85%
Country	10.48%
Democratic Labor	5.96%
Australia	4.21%
Independents	2.54%
Communist	0.03%
Parliamentary seats
Labor	44
Liberal	34
Country	18
Independents	2
Democratic Labor	1

== Seats changing hands ==
Seat	Pre-1973			Swing	Post-1973		
Seat	Party	Member	Margin	Swing	Margin	Member	Party
Burrendong	Labor	Leo Nott	1.8	-5.6	3.8	Roger Wotton	Country
Gordon	Liberal	Harry Jago*	N/A	N/A	29.4	Kevin Harrold	Democratic Labor
South Coast	Liberal	Jack Beale	0.9	-2.3	1.7	John Hatton	Independent

- Members listed in italics did not recontest their seats.
- Sitting Liberal MP for Gordon, Harry Jago failed to renominate as a candidate by the deadline. As a result, the Liberal party endorsed the DLP candidate against the Labor candidate, and Kevin Harrold won the seat.
- In addition, the Liberal party held the seat of Murray, which it had won from an Independent in the 1973 by-election.

=== Redistribution affected seats ===
Seat	1971 election			1973 redistribution			Swing	1973 election		
Seat	Party	Member	Margin	Party	Member	Margin	Swing	Margin	Member	Party
Gosford	Labor	Keith O'Connell	2.6	Liberal	Notional	1.1	+4.6	5.7	Malcolm Brooks	Liberal
Nepean	Labor	Ron Mulock	1.6	Liberal	Notional	1.9	+1.4	3.3	Ron Rofe	Liberal

- Members listed in italics did not recontest their seats.
- Sitting Labor member for Gosford, Keith O'Connell instead contested the new seat of Peats and won.
- Sitting Labor member for Nepean, Ron Mulock instead contested the new seat of Penrith and won.

== Post-election pendulum ==
Liberal/Country seats (51)
Marginal
Murray	Mary Meillon	LIB	2.7% v IND
Hurstville	Tom Mead	LIB	3.1%
Nepean	Ron Rofe	LIB	3.3%
Ashfield	David Hunter	LIB	3.6%
Burrendong	Roger Wotton	CP	3.8%
Cronulla	Ian Griffith	LIB	4.7%
Fuller	Peter Coleman	LIB	5.3%
Gosford	Malcolm Brooks	LIB	5.7%
Fairly safe
Miranda	Tim Walker	LIB	6.4%
Earlwood	Eric Willis	LIB	6.7%
Monaro	Steve Mauger	LIB	7.3%
Yaralla	Lerryn Mutton	LIB	9.8%
Safe
Young	George Freudenstein	CP	10.4%
Wakehurst	Allan Viney	LIB	11.4%
Wollondilly	Tom Lewis	LIB	12.0%
Burwood	John Jackett	LIB	12.4%
Bathurst	Clive Osborne	CP	12.8%
Armidale	David Leitch	CP	13.0%
Manly	Douglas Darby	LIB	13.0%
Albury	Gordon Mackie	LIB	13.4%
Tamworth	Noel Park	CP	13.6%
Upper Hunter	Col Fisher	CP	13.8%
Byron	Jack Boyd	CP	14.3%
Kirribilli	John Waddy	LIB	14.3%
Dubbo	John Mason	LIB	15.0%
Hornsby	Neil Pickard	LIB	15.4%
Hawkesbury	Kevin Rozzoli	LIB	16.5%
Eastwood	Jim Clough	LIB	17.4% v AP
Goulburn	Ron Brewer	CP	17.9%
Clarence	Matt Singleton	CP	18.1%
Raleigh	Jim Brown	CP	18.4%
Tenterfield	Tim Bruxner	CP	18.6%
Vaucluse	Keith Doyle	LIB	18.8% v AP
Davidson	Dick Healey	LIB	19.0%
Pittwater	Robert Askin	LIB	19.2%
Lane Cove	Ken McCaw	LIB	19.3%
Willoughby	Laurie McGinty	LIB	19.3%
Maitland	Milton Morris	LIB	19.6%
Wagga Wagga	Wal Fife	LIB	19.7%
Orange	Charles Cutler	CP	20.1%
The Hills	Max Ruddock	LIB	20.2%
Northcott	Jim Cameron	LIB	20.4% v AP
Temora	Jim Taylor	CP	20.5%
Sturt	Tim Fischer	CP	21.7%
Oxley	Bruce Cowan	CP	22.6%
Lismore	Bruce Duncan	CP	24.8%
Gloucester	Leon Punch	CP	25.2%
Barwon	Geoff Crawford	CP	25.5% v AP
Bligh	John Barraclough	LIB	30.0% v AP
Mosman	David Arblaster	LIB	30.0% v AP
Ku-ring-gai	John Maddison	LIB	31.2%

Labor seats (45)
Marginal
Coogee	Michael Cleary	ALP	0.1%*
Drummoyne	Michael Maher	ALP	0.7%
Georges River	Frank Walker	ALP	0.7%
Casino	Don Day	ALP	1.0%
Castlereagh	Jack Renshaw	ALP	1.3%
Murrumbidgee	Lin Gordon	ALP	1.7%
Burrinjuck	Terry Sheahan	ALP	2.0%
Woronora	Maurie Keane	ALP	2.2%
Kogarah	Bill Crabtree	ALP	5.1%
Campbelltown	Cliff Mallam	ALP	5.6%
Fairly safe
Waverley	Syd Einfeld	ALP	6.4%
Parramatta	Dan Mahoney	ALP	6.6%
Peats	Keith O'Connell	ALP	7.3%
Charlestown	Richard Face	ALP	8.4%
Lakemba	Vince Durick	ALP	9.7%
Canterbury	Kevin Stewart	ALP	9.9%
Maroubra	Bill Haigh	ALP	9.9%
Penrith	Ron Mulock	ALP	9.9%
Safe
Wentworthville	Ernie Quinn	ALP	10.1%
Bass Hill	Neville Wran	ALP	10.7%
East Hills	Pat Rogan	ALP	11.1%
Merrylands	Jack Ferguson	ALP	11.9%
Wollongong	Eric Ramsay	ALP	12.4%
Blacktown	Gordon Barnier	ALP	12.7%
Bankstown	Nick Kearns	ALP	12.8%
Newcastle	Arthur Wade	ALP	12.9%
Mount Druitt	Tony Johnson	ALP	13.3%
Rockdale	Brian Bannon	ALP	13.4%
Auburn	Peter Cox	ALP	14.1%
Munmorah	Harry Jensen	ALP	14.6%
Corrimal	Laurie Kelly	ALP	14.8%
Heathcote	Rex Jackson	ALP	15.5%
Granville	Pat Flaherty	ALP	17.5%
Marrickville	Tom Cahill	ALP	17.7%
Fairfield	Eric Bedford	ALP	17.8%
Liverpool	George Paciullo	ALP	18.0%
Illawarra	George Petersen	ALP	22.7% v DLP
Lake Macquarie	Merv Hunter	ALP	23.2% v IND
Heffron	Laurie Brereton	ALP	23.8% v DLP
Phillip	Pat Hills	ALP	24.9%
Balmain	Roger Degen	ALP	26.5% v DLP
Wallsend	Ken Booth	ALP	26.5% v DLP
Waratah	Sam Jones	ALP	26.6% v DLP
Cessnock	George Neilly	ALP	28.1% v DLP
Broken Hill	Lew Johnstone	ALP	unopp.
Crossbench seats (3)
South Coast	John Hatton	IND	1.7% v LIB
Blue Mountains	Harold Coates	IND	6.5% v ALP
Gordon	Kevin Harrold	DLP	29.4% v ALP

- The results for Coogee was based on the result of the by-election that was held as a result of the decision by the Court of Disputed Returns due to the closeness off the result for the electorate at the 1973 election.

== See also ==
- Candidates of the 1973 New South Wales state election
