= Ted Humphries =

Australian politician

Edward Harris Humphries (25 September 1914 – 27 January 1994) was an Australian politician. He was a Liberal Party member of the New South Wales Legislative Assembly from 1965 to 1971, representing the seat of Gosford. He subsequently represented the party in the New South Wales Legislative Council from 1972 to 1978. He is the grandfather of political satirist, Mark Humphries.

== Notes ==
New South Wales Legislative Assembly
Preceded by Harold Jackson	Member for Gosford; 1965–1971	Succeeded by Keith O'Connell
