= Chris Holstein =

Australian politician

Member of the New South Wales Parliament for Gosford
- In office 26 March 2011 – 28 March 2015
- Preceded by: Marie Andrews
- Succeeded by: Kathy Smith

Personal details
- Born: Christopher David Holstein; 19 May 1958 (age 67) Waratah, New South Wales
- Party: Liberal Party
- Profession: Small business owner

Christopher David Holstein (born 19 May 1958) is an Australian politician who served as a member of the New South Wales Legislative Assembly representing Gosford for the Liberal Party from 2011 to 2015.

== Early years and background ==
Holstein has lived on the Central Coast since he was eight years of age, attending Gosford High School. His family has small businesses in the area and he became involved in local politics following flooding in the Narara Valley area in 1989. Elected to Gosford City Council in 1991 initially as an independent Councillor, Holstein then later served as Mayor between 2002 and 2010, and during some of his time on Council, he represented the Liberal Party.

Holstein is married with five children and lives in the Narara Valley on the New South Wales Central Coast.

== State political career ==
Holstein sought political office on several occasions prior to achieving success in 2011. In 2003, he ran as an independent candidate for Peats (now abolished) against Labor sitting member Marie Andrews. Holstein was excluded on the final distribution of preferences in favour of the Liberal candidate, and the seat was retained by Andrews. In 2007, he ran as the Liberal candidate for Gosford, again against Labor's Andrews. Holstein gained 45.1 per cent of the two-party vote and the seat was retained by Andrews.

Holstein was successful on the third occasion of running at the 2011 state election, again in Gosford, he achieved a swing of 15.4 points and won the seat with 61.9 per cent of the two-party vote. Holstein was part of a team labeled by the media as the 'Awesome Foursome' who won all four Central Coast seats for the Liberals at the 2011 state election.

Civic offices
Preceded by Tony Sansom	Mayor of the City of Gosford; 1998–2001	Succeeded by Robert Bell
Preceded by Jim Macfadyen	Mayor of the City of Gosford; 2008–2010	Succeeded by Laurie Maher
New South Wales Legislative Assembly
Preceded by Marie Andrews	Member for Gosford; 2011–2015	Succeeded by Kathy Smith
