= Kathy Smith (Australian politician) =

Australian politician

Member of the New South Wales Legislative Assembly for Gosford
- In office 28 March 2015 – 14 February 2017
- Preceded by: Chris Holstein
- Succeeded by: Liesl Tesch

Personal details
- Born: 1948 or 1949 Sheffield, England
- Died: 31 May 2017 (aged 67–68)
- Citizenship: Australian
- Party: Labor Party (from 2014)
- Other political affiliations: Palmer United Party (before 2014)
- Occupation: Business administrator and manager

Kathleen Smith (1948/49 – 31 May 2017) was an Australian politician who served in the New South Wales Legislative Assembly as the member for Gosford for the Labor Party from 2015 to 2017.

Smith was previously the chairwoman of Cancer Voices NSW, and has worked with organisations including the Consumers Health Forum, Medicines Australia, and Cancer Institute of NSW. She was also a member of the Palmer United Party before being selected as the Labor candidate for the seat of Gosford in the 2015 election.

On 14 February 2017, Smith announced that a cancer she had previously been treated for had metastasised, and she would resign from parliament to undergo further treatment. She died on 31 May 2017.

New South Wales Legislative Assembly
Preceded by Chris Holstein	Member for Gosford; 2015–2017	Succeeded by Liesl Tesch
