= Tony Doyle (politician) =

Australian politician

Anthony Kenneth "Tony" Doyle (8 May 1953 – 23 December 1994) was an Australian politician. He was the Labor member for Peats in the New South Wales Legislative Assembly from 1985 to 1994.

The son of Ken and Coralie Doyle, he was educated at Ku-ring-gai and then the University of New South Wales, where he received a Bachelor of Arts. He worked as a legal assistant, a clerical assistant with the Australian Broadcasting Commission and as executive officer to the New South Wales Attorney-General. He was also involved in the Labor Party, being secretary of the Umina-Ettalong Branch 1977–84.

In 1985, Doyle was selected as the Labor candidate for the state seat of Peats for the by-election caused by the death of minister Paul Landa. He was successful, and held the seat easily in 1988 and 1991. On 20 December 1994, Doyle quit Parliament, effective immediately, as he was seriously ill after a long battle with AIDS. He died at Umina three days later, aged 41, and became the second successive member for Peats to die suddenly before 50 and whilst as the incumbent. Tony Doyle died at home, his long-term partner Robert Miles by his side. No by-election was held to replace him due to the proximity of the 1995 election.

New South Wales Legislative Assembly
Preceded by Paul Landa	Member for Peats; 1985–1994	Succeeded by Marie Andrews
