= Brian McGowan (politician) =

Australian politician (1935–1994)

Member of the New South Wales Legislative Assembly
- In office 1 May 1976 – 19 March 1988
- Preceded by: Malcolm Brooks
- Succeeded by: Chris Hartcher
- Constituency: Gosford

Alderman of Gosford City Council
- In office 1988–1990

Personal details
- Born: 23 September 1935 Stanmore, Sydney, Australia
- Died: March 8, 1994 (aged 58)
- Cause of death: Cancer
- Party: Labor
- Children: 3
- Education: Wagga Wagga Teachers College
- Occupation: Politician

Brian McGowan (23 September 1935 – 8 March 1994) was an Australian politician who was elected as a member of the New South Wales Legislative Assembly.

McGowan was born in the Sydney suburb of Stanmore. He left school at 14 and worked as an office boy, telephone technician, tram conductor, and professional fireman. After training at Wagga Wagga Teachers College, McGowan worked at Tocumwal Primary School, Shepardstown Small School in 1961, Nowra High School, and was promoted to The Entrance High School to take up the position of English and History Master.

His political career began when he joined the Labor Party in 1968. He was elected President of the Nowra-Bomaderry Branch in 1971, and stood in the state election for Gosford in 1973. Though defeated in that year, McGowan gained election in 1976 by a mere 74 votes, and held the seat of Gosford until 1988. While in Parliament he was concerned with social and educational issues.

Upon his defeat in the 1988 election he entered Gosford Council where he served one and half years. His wife Margaret stood for the seat at the by-election and served the remainder of Brian's term, and was re-elected for a second term.

Following McGowan's death from cancer, a condolence motion was moved in the New South Wales Parliament on 10 March 1994.

A bridge linking Gosford to West Gosford was named in honour of McGowan on 10 December 1995 and carries the Central Coast Highway.

He married Margaret Jackson in 1958; they had one son, Stewart, and two daughters Megan and Meredith.

New South Wales Legislative Assembly
Preceded by Malcolm Brooks	Member for Gosford; 1976 – 1988	Succeeded by Chris Hartcher
