= Marie Andrews =

Australian politician

Member of the New South Wales Parliament for Gosford
- In office 24 March 2007 – 26 March 2011
- Preceded by: Chris Hartcher
- Succeeded by: Chris Holstein

Member of the New South Wales Parliament for Peats
- In office 25 March 1995 – 2 March 2007
- Preceded by: Tony Doyle
- Succeeded by: Abolished

Personal details
- Born: 9 December 1940 (age 85) Molong, New South Wales
- Party: Labor Party
- Profession: union organiser

Marie Therese Andrews (born 9 December 1940), is an Australian former politician, who was a member of the New South Wales Legislative Assembly representing the electorate of Peats for the Labor Party between 1995 and 2007 and then the electorate of Gosford from 2007 to 2011.

Prior to entering politics, Andrews was a private secretary to the NSW Branch Secretary of the Australian Railways Union (now part of the Australian Rail Tram and Bus Industry Union) for 17 years.

On 8 November 2010, Andrews announced that she would not be contesting the next state election and her seat was won by Chris Holstein of the Liberals.

New South Wales Legislative Assembly
Preceded by Tony Doyle	Member for Peats; 1995–2007	Succeeded by Abolished
Preceded by Chris Hartcher	Member for Gosford; 2007–2011	Succeeded by Chris Holstein
