= Malcolm Brooks =

Australian politician (1930–2020)

Malcolm Harold Brooks OAM (16 June 1930 – 19 June 2020) was an Australian politician who served as member of the New South Wales Legislative Assembly for the district of Gosford from 1973 to 1976 and as Shire President and Mayor of the City of Gosford.

A member of the Liberal Party, Brooks was a councillor on Gosford Council from 1971. In 1973 he was elected Member for Gosford but lost the following election to Labor candidate Brian McGowan by 70 votes. Brooks re-entered local government at the following election and was a Councillor, Shire President and City Mayor through to his unsuccessful re-election attempt as an independent councillor in the 2008 New South Wales Local Government Elections. As a Councillor, Brooks supported retention of Australia's constitutional monarchy, and opposed continued population growth in Gosford City, arguing that local infrastructure could not meet demand.

Prior to entering politics, Brooks was a rally car driver and competed in many around Australia events.

Brooks resided in the Gosford suburb of Point Frederick. He was married with three children. He died in June 2020.

New South Wales Legislative Assembly
Preceded by Keith O'Connell	Member for Gosford; 1973–1976	Succeeded by Brian McGowan
Civic offices
Preceded by J. W. Laurenson	Shire President of Gosford; 1973–1977	Succeeded by Don Leggett
Preceded by Robert Bell	Mayor of the City of Gosford; 2004–2005	Succeeded by Laurie Maher
