= Electoral district of Gosford =

Gosford New South Wales—Legislative Assembly
- Interactive map of district boundaries from the 2023 state election
- State: New South Wales
- Dates current: 1950–present
- MP: Liesl Tesch
- Party: Labor
- Namesake: Gosford
- Electors: 58,134 (2023)
- Area: 867.15 km^{2} (334.8 sq mi)
- Demographic: Provincial
Electorates around Gosford:
Hawkesbury	Cessnock	Wyong
Hawkesbury	Gosford	The Entrance; Terrigal
Hornsby	Hornsby	Pittwater

Gosford is an electoral district of the New South Wales Legislative Assembly in Australia. The electorate covers the southern and western parts of the Central Coast Council in the Central Coast region, including central Gosford and Woy Woy.

It is represented by Liesl Tesch of the Labor Party, elected at the 2017 by-election.

== History ==
The electorate was created in 1950. At the redistribution prior to the 2007 election much of the district of Gosford, then held by Chris Hartcher for the Liberal Party, became part of the district of Terrigal while Gosford absorbed most of the former district of Peats, then held by Marie Andrews for the Labor Party. Antony Green describes the redistribution as effectively being that Gosford was renamed Terrigal while Peats was renamed Gosford.

== Geography ==
On its current boundaries, Gosford includes the suburbs of Bar Point, Blackwall, Booker Bay, Calga, Central Mangrove, Cheero Point, Cogra Bay, Ettalong Beach, Glenworth Valley, Gosford, Greengrove, Horsfield Bay, Kariong, Koolewong Little Wobby, Lower Mangrove, Mangrove Creek, Mangrove Mountain, Marlow, Mooney Mooney, Mooney Mooney Creek, Mount White, Narara, Patonga, Pearl Beach, Peats Ridge, Phegans Bay, Point Clare, Point Frederick, Somersby, Spencer, Tascott, Ten Mile Hollow, Umina Beach, Upper Mangrove, West Gosford, Wondabyne, Woy Woy, Woy Woy Bay and parts of East Gosford and North Gosford.

== Demographics ==
The percentage of people in Gosford who were born overseas was 15% which is slightly lower than the national average at 22.2% and the percentage of people who have Australian citizenship is only slightly higher than the national average of 86.1% at 88.4%. As for languages spoken at home English only was the most common language spoken by 90.4% of the population which is substantially higher than national average at 78.5%. Italian was second with 0.4%, while no other language was spoken by more than 0.3% of the total population. Anglicanism was the most common religion at 28.2%, followed by Catholicism at 26.6%, No Religion with 14.9% and Uniting Church at 5.6%. Median incomes for the population aged 15 years and over was only slightly lower in both weekly individual income and weekly household income but slightly higher in the weekly family income category.

== Members for Gosford ==
Member	Party	Period
Harold Jackson	Liberal	1950–1965
Ted Humphries	Liberal	1965–1971
Keith O'Connell	Labor	1971–1973
Malcolm Brooks	Liberal	1973–1976
Brian McGowan	Labor	1976–1988
Chris Hartcher	Liberal	1988–2007
Marie Andrews	Labor	2007–2011
Chris Holstein	Liberal	2011–2015
Kathy Smith	Labor	2015–2017
Liesl Tesch	Labor	2017–present

== Election results ==
2023 New South Wales state election: Gosford
Party	Candidate	Votes	%	±%
Labor	Liesl Tesch	24,703	50.4	+6.3
Liberal	Dee Bocking	13,881	28.3	−7.8
Greens	Hilary van Haren	4,553	9.3	+0.2
Shooters, Fishers, Farmers	Larry Freeman	2,071	4.2	−0.5
Independent	Lisa Bellamy	1,668	3.4	+3.4
Animal Justice	Emily McCallum	1,336	2.7	−0.7
Sustainable Australia	Ineka Soetens	806	1.6	−0.8
Total formal votes		49,018	97.0	+0.5
Informal votes		1,524	3.0	−0.5
Turnout		50,542	86.9	−2.0
Two-party-preferred result
Labor	Liesl Tesch	29,023	65.4	+8.3
Liberal	Dee Bocking	15,364	34.6	−8.3
Labor hold		Swing	+8.3	
