= Keith O'Connell =

Australian politician

Keith O'Connell (24 November 1923 — 28 November 2006) was an Australian politician. He was a Labor member of the New South Wales Legislative Assembly from 1971 to 1984, representing Gosford until 1973 and Peats thereafter.

O'Connell was born in East Greta and attended government schools at Morisset East and Newcastle before becoming an electrical fitter. In 1952 he became a storekeeper at Toukley. He was elected to Wyong Shire Council in 1959, where he served until 1971. He was chairman of Brisbane Water County Council from 1960 to 1971 and a member of the local government electricity association from 1960 to 1971, becoming president in his last year. He was also a member of the New South Wales Electricity Authority (1961–1971).

In 1971, O'Connell was selected as the Labor candidate for Gosford and defeated sitting Liberal MP Ted Humphries. In 1973, the creation of Peats left Gosford with a Liberal majority, and O'Connell contested the new seat instead. He held the seat easily until his retirement in 1984, which allowed Paul Landa, Labor's leader in the Legislative Council, to shift to the Assembly.

O'Connell died in 2006.

New South Wales Legislative Assembly
Preceded by Ted Humphries	Member for Gosford; 1971–1973	Succeeded by Malcolm Brooks
Preceded by New seat	Member for Peats; 1973–1984	Succeeded by Paul Landa
