= Electoral district of Peats =

Former state electoral district of New South Wales, Australia

Peats was an electoral district of the Legislative Assembly in the Australian state of New South Wales from 1973 to 2007. It was replaced by Gosford for the 2007 state election.

== Members ==
Member	Party	Period
Keith O'Connell	Labor	1973–1984
Paul Landa	Labor	1984–1984
Tony Doyle	Labor	1985–1994
Marie Andrews	Labor	1995–2007

== Election results ==
2003 New South Wales state election: Peats
Party	Candidate	Votes	%	±%
Labor	Marie Andrews	18,180	43.9	−6.0
Liberal	Debra Wales	11,620	28.1	−3.2
Independent	Chris Holstein	7,582	18.3	+18.3
Greens	Vicki Brooke	2,028	4.9	+2.0
Against Further Immigration	John Goldsmith	643	1.6	+0.5
Independent	Peter Moore	547	1.3	+1.3
Save Our Suburbs	Mark Ellis	513	1.2	+1.2
Democrats	Geoff Ward	306	0.7	−3.2
Total formal votes		41,419	97.8	+0.3
Informal votes		936	2.2	−0.3
Turnout		42,355	93.2	
Two-party-preferred result
Labor	Marie Andrews	21,181	59.7	−1.6
Liberal	Debra Wales	14,289	40.3	+1.6
Labor hold		Swing	−1.6	
