= Members of the New South Wales Legislative Assembly, 1978–1981 =

Members of the New South Wales Legislative Assembly who served in the 46th parliament held their seats from 1978 to 1981. They were elected at the 1978 election, and at by-elections. The Speaker was Laurie Kelly.

Name	Party	Electorate	Term in office
John Akister	Labor	Monaro	1976–1988
Peter Anderson	Labor	Nepean	1978–1988, 1989–1995
David Arblaster	Liberal	Mosman	1972–1984
Brian Bannon	Labor	Rockdale	1959–1986
Gordon Barnier	Labor	Blacktown	1971–1981
John Barraclough	Liberal	Bligh	1968–1981
Eric Bedford	Labor	Fairfield	1968–1985
Ken Booth	Labor	Wallsend	1960–1988
Jack Boyd	National Country	Byron	1973–1984
Laurie Brereton	Labor	Heffron	1970–1971, 1973–1990
Ron Brewer	National Country	Goulburn	1965–1984
Eddie Britt	Labor	Willoughby	1978–1981
Bob Brown (Note: Cessnock Labor MLA Bob Brown resigned on 29 August 1980 in order to contest the federal seat of Hunter at the 1980 election. Labor candidate Stan Neilly won the resulting by-election on 21 February 1981.)	Labor	Cessnock	1978–1980
Jim Brown	National Country	Raleigh	1959–1984
Tim Bruxner	National Country	Tenterfield	1962–1981
Tom Cahill	Labor	Marrickville	1959–1983
Jim Cameron	Liberal	Northcott	1968–1984
Fred Caterson	Liberal	The Hills	1976–1990
Rodney Cavalier	Labor	Fuller	1978–1988
Michael Cleary	Labor	Coogee	1974–1991
Jim Clough	Liberal	Eastwood	1956–1988
Mick Clough	Labor	Blue Mountains	1976–1988, 1991–1999
Bruce Cowan (Note: Oxley NCP MLA Bruce Cowan resigned on 29 August 1980 in order to contest the federal seat of Lyne at the 1980 election. NCP candidate Peter King won the resulting by-election on 21 February 1981.)	National Country	Oxley	1965–1980
Peter Cox	Labor	Auburn	1965–1988
Bill Crabtree	Labor	Kogarah	1953–1983
Jim Curran (Note: Castlereagh Labor MLA Jack Renshaw resigned on 29 January 1980. Labor candidate Jim Curran won the resulting by-election on 23 February.)	Labor	Castlereagh	1980–1981
Don Day	Labor	Casino	1971–1984
Roger Degen	Labor	Balmain	1968–1984
John Dowd	Liberal	Lane Cove	1975–1991
Bruce Duncan	National Country	Lismore	1965–1988
Vince Durick	Labor	Lakemba	1964–1984
Michael Egan	Labor	Cronulla	1978–1984
Syd Einfeld	Labor	Waverley	1965–1981
Richard Face	Labor	Charlestown	1972–2003
Jack Ferguson	Labor	Merrylands	1959–1984
Tim Fischer (Note: Murray Liberal MLA Mary Meillon died on 9 June 1980. Tim Fischer, then the incumbent NCP member for the then-soon-to-be-abolished seat of Sturt resigned his seat and contested and won the resulting by-election for the NCP on 13 September 1980. This in turn resulted in another by-election in Sturt, which was won by NCP candidate and former federal MP John Sullivan on 21 February 1981.)	National Country	Sturt/Murray;^{[2]}	1971–1980, 1980–1984
Col Fisher	National Country	Upper Hunter	1970–1988
Pat Flaherty	Labor	Granville	1962–1984
Rosemary Foot	Liberal	Vaucluse	1978–1986
Ken Gabb	Labor	Earlwood	1978–1988
Lin Gordon	Labor	Murrumbidgee	1970–1984
Nick Greiner (Note: Ku-ring-gai Liberal MLA John Maddison resigned on 4 July 1980. Liberal candidate Nick Greiner won the resulting by-election on 13 September.)	Liberal	Ku-ring-gai	1980–1992
Bill Haigh	Labor	Maroubra	1968–1983
John Hatton	Independent	South Coast	1973–1995
George Freudenstein	National Country	Young	1959–1981
Dick Healey	Liberal	Davidson	1962–1981
Pat Hills	Labor	Phillip	1954–1988
Merv Hunter	Labor	Lake Macquarie	1969–1991
Rex Jackson	Labor	Heathcote	1955–1986
Harry Jensen	Labor	Munmorah	1965–1981
Tony Johnson	Labor	Mount Druitt	1973–1983
Lew Johnstone	Labor	Broken Hill	1965–1981
Sam Jones	Labor	Waratah	1965–1984
Maurie Keane	Labor	Woronora	1973–1988
Nick Kearns (Note: Bankstown Labor MLA Nick Kearns died on 24 July 1980. Labor candidate Ric Mochalski won the resulting by-election on 13 September.)	Labor	Bankstown	1962–1980
Laurie Kelly	Labor	Corrimal	1968–1988
Peter King	National Country	Oxley	1981
Bill Knott	Labor	Wollondilly	1978–1986
Michael Maher	Labor	Drummoyne	1973–1982
John Maddison	Liberal	Ku-ring-gai	1962–1980
Harold Mair	Labor	Albury	1978–1988
Cliff Mallam	Labor	Campbelltown	1953–1968, 1971–1981
John Mason	Liberal	Dubbo	1965–1981
Bill McCarthy	Labor	Armidale	1978–1987
Bruce McDonald	Liberal	Kirribilli	1976–1981
Brian McGowan	Labor	Gosford	1976–1988
Garry McIlwaine	Labor	Yaralla	1978–1988
Mary Meillon	Liberal	Murray	1973–1980
Ric Mochalski	Labor	Bankstown	1980–1986
Tim Moore	Liberal	Gordon	1976–1992
Milton Morris (Note: Maitland Liberal MLA Milton Morris resigned on 29 August 1980 in order to contest the federal seat of Lyne at the 1980 election. Liberal candidate Peter Toms won the resulting by-election on 21 February 1981.)	Liberal	Maitland	1956–1980
Ron Mulock	Labor	Penrith	1971–1988
Wal Murray	National Country	Barwon	1976–1995
Stan Neilly	Labor	Cessnock	1981–1988, 1991–1999
Keith O'Connell	Labor	Peats	1971–1984
Phil O'Neill	Labor	Burwood	1978–1984
Clive Osborne	National Country	Bathurst	1967–1981
George Paciullo	Labor	Liverpool	1971–1989
Noel Park	National Country	Tamworth	1973–1991
George Petersen	Labor	Illawarra	1968–1988
Neil Pickard	Liberal	Hornsby	1973–1991
Leon Punch	National Country	Gloucester	1959–1985
Ernie Quinn	Labor	Wentworthville	1962–1988
Eric Ramsay	Labor	Wollongong	1971–1984
Jack Renshaw	Labor	Castlereagh	1941–1980
Bill Robb	Labor	Miranda	1978–1984
Pat Rogan	Labor	East Hills	1973–1999
Kevin Rozzoli	Liberal	Hawkesbury	1973–2003
Kevin Ryan	Labor	Hurstville	1976–1984
Joe Schipp	Liberal	Wagga Wagga	1975–1999
Terry Sheahan	Labor	Burrinjuck	1973–1988
Matt Singleton	National Country	Clarence	1971–1990
Max Smith	Liberal	Pittwater	1978–1986
Alan Stewart	Labor	Manly	1978–1984
Kevin Stewart	Labor	Canterbury	1962–1985
John Sullivan	National Country	Sturt	1981
Jim Taylor	National Country	Temora	1960–1981
Peter Toms	Liberal	Maitland	1981
Arthur Wade	Labor	Newcastle	1968–1988
Frank Walker	Labor	Georges River	1970–1988
Tom Webster	Labor	Wakehurst	1978–1984
Garry West	National Country	Orange	1976–1996
Paul Whelan	Labor	Ashfield	1976–2003
Barry Wilde	Labor	Parramatta	1976–1988
Roger Wotton	National Country	Burrendong	1968–1971, 1973–1991
Neville Wran	Labor	Bass Hill	1973–1986

== See also ==
- Second Wran ministry
- Third Wran ministry
- Results of the 1978 New South Wales state election (Legislative Assembly)
- Candidates of the 1978 New South Wales state election
