= Electoral results for the district of Bankstown =

Election results for Bankstown, New South Wales, Australia

Bankstown, an electoral district of the Legislative Assembly in the Australian state of New South Wales, was established in 1927. Every election has been won by a member of the Labor Party.

| Election | Member | Party |
|---|---|---|
| 1927 | James McGirr | Labor |
| 1930 | James McGirr | Labor |
| 1932 | James McGirr | Labor |
| 1935 | James McGirr | Labor |
| 1938 | James McGirr | Labor / Labor (N-C) |
| 1941 | James McGirr | Labor |
| 1944 | James McGirr | Labor |
| 1947 | James McGirr | Labor |
| 1950 | Spence Powell | Labor |
| 1953 | Spence Powell | Labor |
| 1956 | Spence Powell | Labor |
| 1959 | Spence Powell | Labor |
| 1962 | Nick Kearns | Labor |
| 1965 | Nick Kearns | Labor |
| 1968 | Nick Kearns | Labor |
| 1971 | Nick Kearns | Labor |
| 1973 | Nick Kearns | Labor |
| 1976 | Nick Kearns | Labor |
| 1978 | Nick Kearns | Labor |
| 1980 by | Ric Mochalski | Labor |
| 1981 | Ric Mochalski | Labor |
| 1984 | Ric Mochalski | Labor |
| 1987 by | Doug Shedden | Labor |
| 1988 | Doug Shedden | Labor |
| 1991 | Doug Shedden | Labor |
| 1995 | Doug Shedden | Labor |
| 1999 | Tony Stewart | Labor |
| 2003 | Tony Stewart | Labor |
| 2007 | Tony Stewart | Labor |
| 2011 | Tania Mihailuk | Labor |
| 2015 | Tania Mihailuk | Labor |
| 2019 | Tania Mihailuk | Labor |
| 2022 | Tania Mihailuk | Independent |
| 2023 | Tania Mihailuk | One Nation NSW |
| 2023 | Jihad Dib | Labor |

== Election results ==
=== Elections in the 2020s ===
==== 2023 ====
2023 New South Wales state election: Bankstown
| Party | Candidate | Votes | % | ±% |
|---|---|---|---|---|
| Labor | Jihad Dib | 27,247 | 59.4 | −0.8 |
| Liberal | Nathan Taleb | 11,379 | 24.8 | +0.8 |
| Greens | Isaac Nasedra | 2,436 | 5.3 | +0.8 |
| Informed Medical Options | Yosra Alyateem | 1,306 | 2.8 | +2.8 |
| Ind. Socialist Equality | Max Boddy | 1,223 | 2.7 | +2.7 |
| Animal Justice | Dorlene Abou-Haidar | 893 | 1.9 | +0.7 |
| Sustainable Australia | Luke Habib | 725 | 1.6 | +1.6 |
| Public Education | Marianne Glinka | 679 | 1.5 | +1.5 |
| Total formal votes | | 45,888 | 93.4 | −0.4 |
| Informal votes | | 3,267 | 6.6 | +0.4 |
| Turnout | | 49,155 | 82.9 | −2.5 |
Two-party-preferred result
| Labor | Jihad Dib | 29,210 | 70.3 | −0.1 |
| Liberal | Nathan Taleb | 12,322 | 29.7 | +0.1 |
| Labor hold | | Swing | −0.1 | |

=== Elections in the 2010s ===
==== 2019 ====
2019 New South Wales state election: Bankstown
| Party | Candidate | Votes | % | ±% |
|---|---|---|---|---|
| Labor | Tania Mihailuk | 23,897 | 54.65 | −1.68 |
| Liberal | George Zakhia | 13,293 | 30.40 | −0.85 |
| Independent | Saud Abu-Samen | 3,856 | 8.82 | +8.82 |
| Greens | James Rooney | 2,684 | 6.14 | +1.70 |
| Total formal votes | | 43,730 | 93.85 | −0.06 |
| Informal votes | | 2,867 | 6.15 | +0.06 |
| Turnout | | 46,597 | 86.12 | −0.86 |
Two-party-preferred result
| Labor | Tania Mihailuk | 25,735 | 63.82 | −0.15 |
| Liberal | George Zakhia | 14,590 | 36.18 | +0.15 |
| Labor hold | | Swing | −0.15 | |

==== 2015 ====
2015 New South Wales state election: Bankstown
| Party | Candidate | Votes | % | ±% |
|---|---|---|---|---|
| Labor | Tania Mihailuk | 24,170 | 56.3 | +8.8 |
| Liberal | George Zakhia | 13,408 | 31.2 | +0.9 |
| Greens | Luke Poliszcuk | 1,903 | 4.4 | −0.8 |
| Christian Democrats | Juliat Nasr | 1,813 | 4.2 | −0.2 |
| No Land Tax | Jeremy Lawrance | 1,113 | 2.6 | +2.6 |
| Socialist Equality | Oscar Grenfell | 501 | 1.2 | −0.8 |
| Total formal votes | | 42,908 | 93.9 | +1.2 |
| Informal votes | | 2,785 | 6.1 | −1.2 |
| Turnout | | 45,693 | 87.0 | −1.7 |
Two-party-preferred result
| Labor | Tania Mihailuk | 25,382 | 64.0 | +3.4 |
| Liberal | George Zakhia | 14,293 | 36.0 | −3.4 |
| Labor hold | | Swing | +3.4 | |

==== 2011 ====
2011 New South Wales state election: Bankstown
| Party | Candidate | Votes | % | ±% |
|---|---|---|---|---|
| Labor | Tania Mihailuk | 19,327 | 46.3 | −17.9 |
| Liberal | Bill Chahine | 12,457 | 29.9 | +9.9 |
| Independent | Edmond Taouk | 2,955 | 7.1 | +7.1 |
| Independent | Rebecca Kay | 2,709 | 6.5 | +6.5 |
| Christian Democrats | Zarif Abdulla | 1,779 | 4.3 | −0.5 |
| Greens | Malikeh Michels | 1,668 | 4.0 | −1.4 |
| Socialist Equality | Richard Phillips | 818 | 2.0 | +2.0 |
| Total formal votes | | 41,713 | 93.6 | −1.3 |
| Informal votes | | 2,851 | 6.4 | +1.3 |
| Turnout | | 44,564 | 91.5 | −1.2 |
Two-party-preferred result
| Labor | Tania Mihailuk | 21,011 | 60.3 | −15.2 |
| Liberal | Bill Chahine | 13,862 | 39.7 | +15.2 |
| Labor hold | | Swing | −15.2 | |

=== Elections in the 2000s ===
==== 2007 ====
2007 New South Wales state election: Bankstown
| Party | Candidate | Votes | % | ±% |
|---|---|---|---|---|
| Labor | Tony Stewart | 25,671 | 64.2 | +2.7 |
| Liberal | Mark Majewski | 7,977 | 20.0 | +2.5 |
| Greens | Simon Brooks | 2,142 | 5.4 | −1.4 |
| Christian Democrats | Zarif Abdulla | 1,897 | 4.7 | +1.6 |
| Unity | Shawky Salah | 1,444 | 3.6 | −0.5 |
| Against Further Immigration | Lynette Rogers | 845 | 2.1 | +0.6 |
| Total formal votes | | 39,976 | 94.9 | +0.2 |
| Informal votes | | 2,154 | 5.1 | −0.2 |
| Turnout | | 42,130 | 92.7 | |
Two-party-preferred result
| Labor | Tony Stewart | 27,234 | 75.4 | −1.0 |
| Liberal | Mark Majewski | 8,870 | 24.6 | +1.0 |
| Labor hold | | Swing | −1.0 | |

==== 2003 ====
2003 New South Wales state election: Bankstown
| Party | Candidate | Votes | % | ±% |
|---|---|---|---|---|
| Labor | Tony Stewart | 23,787 | 62.7 | −5.5 |
| Liberal | David Grabovac | 5,783 | 15.2 | +0.4 |
| Greens | Sanaa Ghabbar | 2,495 | 6.6 | +4.9 |
| Unity | Nasser Roumieh | 1,988 | 5.2 | +1.2 |
| Christian Democrats | Janne Peterson | 1,259 | 3.3 | +1.2 |
| Socialist Alliance | Sam Wainwright | 973 | 2.6 | +2.6 |
| One Nation | Bradley Torr | 510 | 1.3 | −4.8 |
| Legal System Reform | Hanan Sowilam | 463 | 1.2 | +1.2 |
| Democrats | Joseph McDermott | 353 | 0.9 | +0.9 |
| Against Further Immigration | Gregg Pringle | 352 | 0.9 | +0.1 |
| Total formal votes | | 37,973 | 94.5 | −1.0 |
| Informal votes | | 2,210 | 5.5 | +1.0 |
| Turnout | | 40,183 | 89.6 | |
Two-party-preferred result
| Labor | Tony Stewart | 25,792 | 78.6 | −1.6 |
| Liberal | David Grabovac | 7,004 | 21.4 | +1.6 |
| Labor hold | | Swing | −1.6 | |

=== Elections in the 1990s ===
==== 1999 ====
1999 New South Wales state election: Bankstown
| Party | Candidate | Votes | % | ±% |
|---|---|---|---|---|
| Labor | Tony Stewart | 26,519 | 68.1 | +6.4 |
| Liberal | Paul Barrett | 5,755 | 14.8 | −13.2 |
| One Nation | Barry Ashe | 2,327 | 6.0 | +6.0 |
| Unity | Erick Meguid | 1,551 | 4.0 | +4.0 |
| Christian Democrats | Kylie Laurence | 838 | 2.2 | +2.2 |
| Democrats | Kate Botting | 751 | 1.9 | −2.0 |
| Greens | Kate Walsh | 666 | 1.7 | +1.7 |
| Against Further Immigration | John Bastin | 315 | 0.8 | +0.8 |
| Socialist Equality | Richard Phillips | 239 | 0.6 | +0.6 |
| Total formal votes | | 38,961 | 95.5 | +4.2 |
| Informal votes | | 1,840 | 4.5 | −4.2 |
| Turnout | | 40,801 | 91.2 | |
Two-party-preferred result
| Labor | Tony Stewart | 28,637 | 80.2 | +11.9 |
| Liberal | Paul Barrett | 7,062 | 19.8 | −11.9 |
| Labor hold | | Swing | +11.9 | |

==== 1995 ====
1995 New South Wales state election: Bankstown
| Party | Candidate | Votes | % | ±% |
|---|---|---|---|---|
| Labor | Doug Shedden | 21,747 | 63.5 | +3.4 |
| Liberal | Paul Barrett | 10,875 | 31.7 | −8.2 |
| Democrats | Jeffrey Meikle | 1,062 | 3.1 | +3.1 |
| Natural Law | Mike Smith | 580 | 1.7 | +1.7 |
| Total formal votes | | 34,264 | 92.8 | +16.3 |
| Informal votes | | 2,660 | 7.2 | −16.3 |
| Turnout | | 36,924 | 94.4 | |
Two-party-preferred result
| Labor | Doug Shedden | 22,350 | 66.2 | +6.2 |
| Liberal | Paul Barrett | 11,394 | 33.8 | −6.2 |
| Labor hold | | Swing | +6.2 | |

==== 1991 ====
1991 New South Wales state election: Bankstown
| Party | Candidate | Votes | % | ±% |
|---|---|---|---|---|
| Labor | Doug Shedden | 16,368 | 60.1 | +11.8 |
| Liberal | Paul Barrett | 10,889 | 39.9 | +1.8 |
| Total formal votes | | 27,257 | 67.5 | −18.9 |
| Informal votes | | 8,363 | 23.5 | +18.9 |
| Turnout | | 35,620 | 94.5 | |
| Labor hold | | Swing | +5.3 | |

=== Elections in the 1980s ===
==== 1988 ====
1988 New South Wales state election: Bankstown
| Party | Candidate | Votes | % | ±% |
|---|---|---|---|---|
| Labor | Doug Shedden | 14,258 | 49.7 | −14.4 |
| Liberal | Bob Young | 9,054 | 31.6 | −2.0 |
| Independent | Kevin Ryan | 5,364 | 18.7 | +18.7 |
| Total formal votes | | 28,676 | 95.7 | −0.2 |
| Informal votes | | 1,285 | 4.3 | +0.2 |
| Turnout | | 29,961 | 94.9 | |
Two-party-preferred result
| Labor | Doug Shedden | 15,382 | 59.2 | −6.0 |
| Liberal | Bob Young | 10,592 | 40.8 | +6.0 |
| Labor hold | | Swing | −6.0 | |

==== 1987 by-election ====
1987 Bankstown state by-election
| Party | Candidate | Votes | % | ±% |
|---|---|---|---|---|
| Labor | Doug Shedden | 12,677 | 43.80 | −20.7 |
| Liberal | Terry McDonald | 4,336 | 23.20 | −12.3 |
| Independent | Kevin Ryan | 5,395 | 18.64 | +18.64 |
| Call to Australia | Elaine Nile | 993 | 3.43 | +3.43 |
| Small Business People Group | Norm Axford | 641 | 2.21 | +2.21 |
| Democrats | Peter Carver | 603 | 2.08 | +2.08 |
| Independent | John Hillman | 568 | 1.96 | +1.96 |
| Independent | Richard Mezinec | 309 | 1.07 | +1.07 |
| Unite Australia | Peter Sawyer | 243 | 0.84 | +0.84 |
| Humanist | Scott Wilkie | 172 | 0.59 | +0.59 |
| Centre Unity | John Beasley | 93 | 0.32 | +0.32 |
| New Australian Republic | John Vartanian | 74 | 0.26 | +0.26 |
| Total formal votes | | 28,940 | 95.689 | |
| Informal votes | | 1,308 | 4.32 | |
| Turnout | | 30,248 | 84.85 | |
Two-party-preferred result
| Labor | Doug Shedden | 14,832 | 61.37 | −3.13 |
| Liberal | Terry McDonald | 9,336 | 38.63 | +3.13 |
| Labor hold | | Swing | −3.13 | |

Labor party member Ric Mochalski resigned.

==== 1984 ====
1984 New South Wales state election: Bankstown
| Party | Candidate | Votes | % | ±% |
|---|---|---|---|---|
| Labor | Ric Mochalski | 19,403 | 64.5 | −0.4 |
| Liberal | Terry McDonald | 10,668 | 35.5 | +5.6 |
| Total formal votes | | 30,071 | 96.0 | +0.2 |
| Informal votes | | 1,258 | 4.0 | −0.2 |
| Turnout | | 31,329 | 93.8 | +1.0 |
| Labor hold | | Swing | −4.2 | |

==== 1981 ====
1981 New South Wales state election: Bankstown
| Party | Candidate | Votes | % | ±% |
|---|---|---|---|---|
| Labor | Ric Mochalski | 18,754 | 64.9 | −8.1 |
| Liberal | James McDonald | 8,634 | 29.9 | +9.2 |
| Independent | Donna Hoban | 1,513 | 5.2 | +5.2 |
| Total formal votes | | 28,901 | 95.8 | |
| Informal votes | | 1,266 | 4.2 | |
| Turnout | | 30,167 | 92.8 | |
Two-party-preferred result
| Labor | Ric Mochalski | 19,530 | 68.7 | −7.1 |
| Liberal | James McDonald | 8,900 | 31.3 | +7.1 |
| Labor hold | | Swing | −7.1 | |

==== 1980 by-election ====
1980 Bankstown by-election Saturday 13 September
| Party | Candidate | Votes | % | ±% |
|---|---|---|---|---|
| Labor | Ric Mochalski | 16,074 | 65.6 | −7.4 |
| Liberal | James McDonald | 8,414 | 34.4 | +13.7 |
| Total formal votes | | 24,488 | 96.9 | −0.4 |
| Informal votes | | 779 | 3.1 | +0.4 |
| Turnout | | 25,267 | 77.5 | −16.7 |
| Labor hold | | Swing | −10.2 | |

Nick Kearns (Labor) died.

=== Elections in the 1970s ===
==== 1978 ====
1978 New South Wales state election: Bankstown
| Party | Candidate | Votes | % | ±% |
|---|---|---|---|---|
| Labor | Nick Kearns | 22,604 | 73.0 | +7.5 |
| Liberal | John Ghent | 6,417 | 20.7 | −13.8 |
| Democrats | Vera Stewart | 1,939 | 6.3 | +6.3 |
| Total formal votes | | 30,960 | 97.3 | −0.7 |
| Informal votes | | 855 | 2.7 | +0.7 |
| Turnout | | 31,815 | 94.2 | 0.0 |
Two-party-preferred result
| Labor | Nick Kearns | 23,470 | 75.8 | +10.3 |
| Liberal | John Ghent | 7,490 | 24.2 | −10.3 |
| Labor hold | | Swing | +10.3 | |

==== 1976 ====
1976 New South Wales state election: Bankstown
| Party | Candidate | Votes | % | ±% |
|---|---|---|---|---|
| Labor | Nick Kearns | 20,619 | 65.5 | +3.5 |
| Liberal | John Ghent | 10,872 | 34.5 | +0.7 |
| Total formal votes | | 31,491 | 98.0 | +1.0 |
| Informal votes | | 657 | 2.0 | −1.0 |
| Turnout | | 32,148 | 94.2 | +0.4 |
| Labor hold | | Swing | +2.7 | |

==== 1973 ====
1973 New South Wales state election: Bankstown
| Party | Candidate | Votes | % | ±% |
|---|---|---|---|---|
| Labor | Nick Kearns | 18,920 | 62.0 | −1.9 |
| Liberal | John Ghent | 10,306 | 33.8 | −2.3 |
| Democratic Labor | Joseph Sanders | 1,303 | 4.3 | +4.3 |
| Total formal votes | | 30,529 | 97.0 | |
| Informal votes | | 941 | 3.0 | |
| Turnout | | 31,470 | 93.8 | |
Two-party-preferred result
| Labor | Nick Kearns | 19,181 | 62.8 | −1.1 |
| Liberal | John Ghent | 11,348 | 37.2 | +1.1 |
| Labor hold | | Swing | −1.1 | |

==== 1971 ====
1971 New South Wales state election: Bankstown
| Party | Candidate | Votes | % | ±% |
|---|---|---|---|---|
| Labor | Nick Kearns | 17,115 | 63.9 | +4.6 |
| Liberal | John Ghent | 9,683 | 36.1 | −4.6 |
| Total formal votes | | 26,798 | 97.3 | |
| Informal votes | | 750 | 2.7 | |
| Turnout | | 27,548 | 94.6 | |
| Labor hold | | Swing | +4.6 | |

=== Elections in the 1960s ===
==== 1968 ====
1968 New South Wales state election: Bankstown
| Party | Candidate | Votes | % | ±% |
|---|---|---|---|---|
| Labor | Nick Kearns | 15,256 | 59.3 | +4.5 |
| Liberal | John Ghent | 10,455 | 40.7 | −0.5 |
| Total formal votes | | 25,711 | 97.0 | |
| Informal votes | | 795 | 3.0 | |
| Turnout | | 26,506 | 94.9 | |
| Labor hold | | Swing | +1.3 | |

==== 1965 ====
1965 New South Wales state election: Bankstown
| Party | Candidate | Votes | % | ±% |
|---|---|---|---|---|
| Labor | Nick Kearns | 14,025 | 54.8 | −5.1 |
| Liberal | David Cowan | 10,540 | 41.2 | +5.9 |
| Communist | Frank Bollins | 1,038 | 4.0 | −0.8 |
| Total formal votes | | 25,603 | 97.8 | −0.7 |
| Informal votes | | 563 | 2.2 | +0.7 |
| Turnout | | 26,166 | 94.1 | −0.1 |
Two-party-preferred result
| Labor | Nick Kearns | 14,855 | 58.0 | −5.8 |
| Liberal | David Cowan | 10,748 | 42.0 | +5.8 |
| Labor hold | | Swing | −5.8 | |

==== 1962 ====
1962 New South Wales state election: Bankstown
| Party | Candidate | Votes | % | ±% |
|---|---|---|---|---|
| Labor | Nick Kearns | 15,292 | 59.9 | +0.6 |
| Liberal | David Cowan | 9,006 | 35.3 | +1.8 |
| Communist | Allan Cooper | 1,235 | 4.8 | +1.6 |
| Total formal votes | | 25,533 | 98.5 | |
| Informal votes | | 393 | 1.5 | |
| Turnout | | 25,926 | 94.2 | |
Two-party-preferred result
| Labor | Nick Kearns | 16,280 | 63.8 | −0.1 |
| Liberal | David Cowan | 9,253 | 36.2 | +0.1 |
| Labor hold | | Swing | −0.1 | |

=== Elections in the 1950s ===
==== 1959 ====
1959 New South Wales state election: Bankstown
| Party | Candidate | Votes | % | ±% |
|---|---|---|---|---|
| Labor | Spence Powell | 12,519 | 59.3 | |
| Liberal | Fred Howe | 7,066 | 33.5 | |
| Independent | Charles Reid | 842 | 4.0 | |
| Communist | Jack Hughes | 670 | 3.2 | |
| Total formal votes | | 21,097 | 97.9 | |
| Informal votes | | 448 | 2.1 | |
| Turnout | | 21,545 | 94.7 | |
Two-party-preferred result
| Labor | Spence Powell | 13,476 | 63.9 | |
| Liberal | Fred Howe | 7,621 | 36.1 | |
| Labor hold | | Swing | | |

==== 1956 ====
1956 New South Wales state election: Bankstown
| Party | Candidate | Votes | % | ±% |
|---|---|---|---|---|
| Labor | Spence Powell | 14,268 | 59.4 | −30.0 |
| Liberal | Reginald Allsop | 8,767 | 36.5 | +36.5 |
| Communist | Roy Boyd | 981 | 4.1 | −6.5 |
| Total formal votes | | 24,016 | 98.2 | +5.7 |
| Informal votes | | 444 | 1.8 | −5.7 |
| Turnout | | 24,460 | 94.5 | +0.9 |
Two-party-preferred result
| Labor | Spence Powell | 18,181 | 63.1 | −26.3 |
| Liberal | Reginald Allsop | 8,865 | 36.9 | +36.9 |
| Labor hold | | Swing | N/A | |

==== 1953 ====
1953 New South Wales state election: Bankstown
| Party | Candidate | Votes | % | ±% |
|---|---|---|---|---|
| Labor | Spence Powell | 16,726 | 89.4 | |
| Communist | Claude Jones | 1,981 | 10.6 | |
| Total formal votes | | 18,707 | 92.5 | |
| Informal votes | | 1,517 | 7.5 | |
| Turnout | | 20,224 | 93.6 | |
| Labor hold | | Swing | | |

==== 1950 ====
1950 New South Wales state election: Bankstown
| Party | Candidate | Votes | % | ±% |
|---|---|---|---|---|
| Labor | Spence Powell | 15,616 | 62.8 | |
| Liberal | Blanche Barkl | 9,242 | 37.2 | |
| Total formal votes | | 24,858 | 98.4 | |
| Informal votes | | 407 | 1.6 | |
| Turnout | | 25,265 | 93.4 | |
| Labor hold | | Swing | | |

=== Elections in the 1940s ===
==== 1947 ====
1947 New South Wales state election: Bankstown
| Party | Candidate | Votes | % | ±% |
|---|---|---|---|---|
| Labor | James McGirr | 16,858 | 60.9 | +1.9 |
| Liberal | John Byrne | 5,783 | 20.9 | +20.9 |
| Lang Labor | Ernest Callaghan | 3,300 | 11.9 | −29.1 |
| Independent | George Durrance | 1,751 | 6.3 | +6.3 |
| Total formal votes | | 27,692 | 98.7 | +3.9 |
| Informal votes | | 375 | 1.3 | −3.9 |
| Turnout | | 28,067 | 94.6 | +1.9 |
| Labor hold | | Swing | N/A | |

- Preferences were not distributed.

==== 1944 ====
1944 New South Wales state election: Bankstown
| Party | Candidate | Votes | % | ±% |
|---|---|---|---|---|
| Labor | James McGirr | 12,507 | 59.0 | −4.3 |
| Lang Labor | Stephen Roberts | 8,706 | 41.0 | +41.0 |
| Total formal votes | | 21,213 | 94.8 | −1.7 |
| Informal votes | | 1,156 | 5.2 | +1.7 |
| Turnout | | 22,369 | 92.7 | −0.4 |
| Labor hold | | Swing | N/A | |

==== 1941 ====
1941 New South Wales state election: Bankstown
| Party | Candidate | Votes | % | ±% |
|---|---|---|---|---|
| Labor | James McGirr | 10,953 | 54.7 | |
| Independent | Percy Coleman | 5,343 | 26.7 | |
| State Labor | Morris Hughes | 2,873 | 14.4 | |
| New Social Order | Jack Edwards | 855 | 4.3 | |
| Total formal votes | | 20,024 | 96.5 | |
| Informal votes | | 731 | 3.5 | |
| Turnout | | 20,755 | 93.1 | |
| Labor hold | | Swing | | |

- Preferences were not distributed.

=== Elections in the 1930s ===
==== 1938 ====
1938 New South Wales state election: Bankstown
| Party | Candidate | Votes | % | ±% |
|---|---|---|---|---|
| Labor | James McGirr | unopposed | | |
| Labor hold | | | | |

==== 1935 ====
1935 New South Wales state election: Bankstown
| Party | Candidate | Votes | % | ±% |
|---|---|---|---|---|
| Labor (NSW) | James McGirr | 11,808 | 53.6 | +5.5 |
| United Australia | Julian De Meyrick | 9,258 | 42.0 | +5.1 |
| Communist | Frederick Loveday | 963 | 4.4 | +2.8 |
| Total formal votes | | 22,029 | 97.8 | +0.4 |
| Informal votes | | 491 | 2.2 | −0.4 |
| Turnout | | 22,520 | 96.6 | +0.4 |
| Labor (NSW) hold | | Swing | N/A | |

- Preferences were not distributed.

==== 1932 ====
1932 New South Wales state election: Bankstown
| Party | Candidate | Votes | % | ±% |
|---|---|---|---|---|
| Labor (NSW) | James McGirr | 9,674 | 48.1 | −21.2 |
| United Australia | John Byrne | 7,420 | 36.9 | +8.1 |
| Federal Labor | John Metcalfe | 1,553 | 7.7 | +7.7 |
| Ind. United Australia | Jacob Cook | 1,145 | 5.7 | +5.7 |
| Communist | Michael Ryan | 314 | 1.6 | +0.5 |
| Total formal votes | | 20,106 | 97.4 | +0.8 |
| Informal votes | | 546 | 2.6 | −0.8 |
| Turnout | | 20,652 | 96.2 | −0.4 |
Two-party-preferred result
| Labor (NSW) | James McGirr | 10,608 | 52.8 | |
| United Australia | John Byrne | 9,498 | 47.2 | |
| Labor (NSW) hold | | Swing | N/A | |

==== 1930 ====
1930 New South Wales state election: Bankstown
| Party | Candidate | Votes | % | ±% |
|---|---|---|---|---|
| Labor | James McGirr | 12,709 | 69.3 | |
| Nationalist | Edward Gill | 5,286 | 28.8 | |
| Communist | Oliver Griffin | 192 | 1.1 | |
| Independent | Frederick Wills | 145 | 0.8 | |
| Total formal votes | | 18,332 | 96.6 | |
| Informal votes | | 645 | 3.4 | |
| Turnout | | 18,977 | 96.6 | |
| Labor hold | | Swing | | |

=== Elections in the 1920s ===
==== 1927 ====
1927 New South Wales state election: Bankstown
| Party | Candidate | Votes | % | ±% |
|---|---|---|---|---|
| Labor | James McGirr | 7,548 | 55.6 | |
| Nationalist | Arthur Gardiner | 5,742 | 42.3 | |
| Ind. Nationalist | Frederick Webster | 181 | 1.3 | |
| Independent | Alfred Finney | 105 | 0.8 | |
| Total formal votes | | 13,576 | 99.1 | |
| Informal votes | | 118 | 0.9 | |
| Turnout | | 13,694 | 86.4 | |
| Labor win | | (new seat) | | |
