= Results of the 1978 New South Wales Legislative Assembly election =

State election for New South Wales, Australia in October 1978

New South Wales state election, 7 October 1978 Legislative Assembly << 1976–1981 >>
Enrolled voters	3,085,661				
Votes cast	2,862,616		Turnout	92.77	–0.52
Informal votes	65,274		Informal	2.28	+0.52
Summary of votes by party
Party	Primary votes	%	Swing	Seats	Change
Labor	1,615,949	57.77	+8.02	63	+13
Liberal	754,796	26.98	–9.31	18	–12
National Country	276,984	9.90	–0.13	17	– 1
Democrats	74,019	2.65	+2.65	0	± 0
Communist	8,472	0.30	+0.22	0	± 0
Socialist Workers	4,467	0.16	+0.07	0	± 0
Independent	62,655	2.24	–0.58	1	± 0
Total	2,797,342			99	

This is a list of electoral district results for the 1978 New South Wales state election.

== Results by Electoral district ==
=== Albury ===
1978 New South Wales state election: Albury
Party	Candidate	Votes	%	±%
Labor	Harold Mair	11,435	48.2	+6.3
Liberal	Phillip Williams	9,304	39.2	−19.0
National Country	Clifford Chamberlain	2,996	12.6	+12.6
Total formal votes		23,735	98.3	−0.1
Informal votes		411	1.7	+0.1
Turnout		24,146	91.6	−0.6
Two-party-preferred result
Labor	Harold Mair	12,024	50.7	+8.8
Liberal	Phillip Williams	11,711	49.3	−8.8
Labor gain from Liberal		Swing	+8.8	

=== Armidale ===
1978 New South Wales state election: Armidale
Party	Candidate	Votes	%	±%
Labor	Bill McCarthy	11,538	48.5	+5.1
National Country	David Leitch	11,345	47.7	−8.9
Democrats	Sidney Burkey	890	3.7	+3.7
Total formal votes		23,773	98.5	−0.2
Informal votes		349	1.5	+0.2
Turnout		24,122	94.1	+1.1
Two-party-preferred result
Labor	Bill McCarthy	12,034	50.6	+7.2
National Country	David Leitch	11,739	49.4	−7.2
Labor gain from National Country		Swing	+7.2	

=== Ashfield ===
1978 New South Wales state election: Ashfield
Party	Candidate	Votes	%	±%
Labor	Paul Whelan	19,814	68.1	+14.6
Liberal	Arthur McDonald	9,279	31.9	−11.9
Total formal votes		29,093	96.3	−1.7
Informal votes		1,130	3.7	+1.7
Turnout		30,223	90.5	−1.1
Labor hold		Swing	+13.0	

=== Auburn ===
1978 New South Wales state election: Auburn
Party	Candidate	Votes	%	±%
Labor	Peter Cox	23,636	76.5	+11.2
Liberal	Maree Lloyd	6,596	21.3	−13.4
Communist	Aileen Beaver	661	2.1	+2.1
Total formal votes		30,893	97.0	−0.4
Informal votes		941	3.0	+0.4
Turnout		31,834	93.6	−1.0
Two-party-preferred result
Labor	Peter Cox	24,204	78.4	+13.1
Liberal	Maree Lloyd	6,686	21.6	−13.1
Labor hold		Swing	+13.1	

=== Balmain ===
1978 New South Wales state election: Balmain
Party	Candidate	Votes	%	±%
Labor	Roger Degen	20,289	74.3	+7.0
Liberal	Ivor Balmain	3,906	14.3	−10.4
Socialist Workers	Lynda Boland	2,030	7.4	+3.9
Communist	Brian Aarons	1,102	4.0	+1.6
Total formal votes		27,327	96.4	−0.6
Informal votes		1,006	3.6	+0.6
Turnout		28,333	88.4	−0.8
Two-party-preferred result
Labor	Roger Degen	23,014	84.2	+10.0
Liberal	Ivor Balmain	4,313	15.8	−10.0
Labor hold		Swing	+10.0	

=== Bankstown ===
1978 New South Wales state election: Bankstown
Party	Candidate	Votes	%	±%
Labor	Nick Kearns	22,604	73.0	+7.5
Liberal	John Ghent	6,417	20.7	−13.8
Democrats	Vera Stewart	1,939	6.3	+6.3
Total formal votes		30,960	97.3	−0.7
Informal votes		855	2.7	+0.7
Turnout		31,815	94.2	0.0
Two-party-preferred result
Labor	Nick Kearns	23,470	75.8	+10.3
Liberal	John Ghent	7,490	24.2	−10.3
Labor hold		Swing	+10.3	

=== Barwon ===
1978 New South Wales state election: Barwon
Party	Candidate	Votes	%	±%
National Country	Wal Murray	12,223	58.3	−0.2
Labor	Marshall Duncan	8,754	41.7	+0.2
Total formal votes		20,977	98.1	−0.5
Informal votes		404	1.9	+0.5
Turnout		21,381	93.1	−0.5
National Country hold		Swing	−0.2	

=== Bass Hill ===
1978 New South Wales state election: Bass Hill
Party	Candidate	Votes	%	±%
Labor	Neville Wran	23,934	78.5	+13.9
Liberal	Phillip Wearne	5,801	19.0	−16.4
Democrats	Gillian Benn	750	2.5	+2.5
Total formal votes		30,485	97.3	−0.5
Informal votes		848	2.7	+0.5
Turnout		31,333	94.3	−0.2
Two-party-preferred result
Labor	Neville Wran	24,309	79.7	+15.1
Liberal	Phillip Wearne	6,176	20.3	−15.1
Labor hold		Swing	+15.1	

=== Bathurst ===
1978 New South Wales state election: Bathurst
Party	Candidate	Votes	%	±%
National Country	Clive Osborne	12,261	52.7	+2.2
Labor	Mark Worthington	11,001	47.3	+3.2
Total formal votes		23,262	98.9	−0.2
Informal votes		254	1.1	+0.2
Turnout		23,516	94.5	−0.8
National Country hold		Swing	−0.3	

=== Blacktown ===
1978 New South Wales state election: Blacktown
Party	Candidate	Votes	%	±%
Labor	Gordon Barnier	23,742	73.1	+10.2
Liberal	Alfred Spiteri	6,039	18.6	−14.9
Democrats	Colin Mannix	2,702	8.3	+8.3
Total formal votes		32,483	96.5	−1.2
Informal votes		1,186	3.5	+1.2
Turnout		33,669	94.5	−0.6
Two-party-preferred result
Labor	Gordon Barnier	25,093	77.2	+12.5
Liberal	Alfred Spiteri	7,390	22.8	−12.5
Labor hold		Swing	+12.5	

=== Bligh ===
1978 New South Wales state election: Bligh
Party	Candidate	Votes	%	±%
Liberal	John Barraclough	15,220	56.1	−1.3
Labor	Suzanne Ashmore-Smith	10,818	39.9	+7.7
Democrats	Susanna Dodgson	1,097	4.0	+4.0
Total formal votes		27,135	96.9	−0.8
Informal votes		879	3.1	+0.8
Turnout		28,014	84.9	−2.7
Two-party-preferred result
Liberal	John Barraclough	15,457	58.4	−5.4
Labor	Suzanne Ashmore-Smith	11,012	41.6	+5.4
Liberal hold		Swing	−5.4	

=== Blue Mountains ===
1978 New South Wales state election: Blue Mountains
Party	Candidate	Votes	%	±%
Labor	Mick Clough	15,187	61.9	+11.4
Independent	Harold Coates	8,050	32.8	−16.7
Democrats	William Player	1,307	5.3	+5.3
Total formal votes		24,544	98.4	+0.1
Informal votes		410	1.6	−0.1
Turnout		24,954	93.0	−0.5
Two-candidate-preferred result
Labor	Mick Clough	15,841	64.5	+14.0
Independent	Harold Coates	8,703	35.5	−14.0
Labor hold		Swing	+14.0	

=== Broken Hill ===
1978 New South Wales state election: Broken Hill
Party	Candidate	Votes	%	±%
Labor	Lew Johnstone	14,519	75.9	−24.1
National Country	John Betterman	3,005	15.7	+15.7
Liberal	Peter Swan	1,609	8.4	+8.4
Total formal votes		19,133	97.9	
Informal votes		417	2.1	
Turnout		19,550	91.8	
Two-party-preferred result
Labor	Lew Johnstone	14,680	77.1	−22.9
National Country	John Betterman	4,353	22.9	+22.9
Labor hold		Swing	−22.9	

=== Burrendong ===
1978 New South Wales state election: Burrendong
Party	Candidate	Votes	%	±%
National Country	Roger Wotton	13,614	58.3	+0.4
Labor	Reynold Toyer	9,746	41.7	−0.4
Total formal votes		23,360	98.6	−0.4
Informal votes		338	1.4	+0.4
Turnout		23,698	94.4	0.0
National Country hold		Swing	+0.4	

=== Burrinjuck ===
1978 New South Wales state election: Burrinjuck
Party	Candidate	Votes	%	±%
Labor	Terry Sheahan	13,865	66.9	+8.1
National Country	Craddock Adams	6,870	33.1	−8.1
Total formal votes		20,735	98.6	−0.5
Informal votes		301	1.4	+0.5
Turnout		21,036	95.1	−0.3
Labor hold		Swing	+8.1	

=== Burwood ===
1978 New South Wales state election: Burwood
Party	Candidate	Votes	%	±%
Labor	Phil O'Neill	12,611	49.7	+9.4
Liberal	John Jackett	11,836	46.7	−8.7
Democrats	Stephen Kirkham	907	3.6	+3.6
Total formal votes		25,354	97.2	−0.8
Informal votes		736	2.8	+0.8
Turnout		26,090	91.4	−0.9
Two-party-preferred result
Labor	Phil O'Neill	13,083	51.6	+10.0
Liberal	John Jackett	12,271	48.4	−10.0
Labor gain from Liberal		Swing	+10.0	

=== Byron ===
1978 New South Wales state election: Byron
Party	Candidate	Votes	%	±%
National Country	Jack Boyd	12,553	50.2	−9.7
Labor	Thomas Hogan	10,660	42.6	+2.5
Democrats	Marcia Ritchie	1,210	4.8	+4.8
Marijuana	Raymond Hunter	593	2.4	+2.4
Total formal votes		25,016	98.5	−0.1
Informal votes		388	1.5	+0.1
Turnout		25,404	92.0	+0.8
Two-party-preferred result
National Country	Jack Boyd	13,406	53.6	−6.3
Labor	Thomas Hogan	11,610	46.4	+6.3
National Country hold		Swing	−6.3	

=== Campbelltown ===
1978 New South Wales state election: Campbelltown
Party	Candidate	Votes	%	±%
Labor	Cliff Mallam	29,085	67.6	+8.7
Liberal	William Sadler	10,612	24.6	−16.5
Democrats	Judith Bradbury	2,060	4.8	+4.8
Independent	John Hennessey	952	2.2	+2.2
Truckers Against Government	Mervyn Blinman	349	0.8	+0.8
Total formal votes		43,058	97.8	+0.3
Informal votes		986	2.2	−0.3
Turnout		44,044	93.9	−0.8
Two-party-preferred result
Labor	Cliff Mallam	30,786	71.5	+12.6
Liberal	William Sadler	12,272	28.5	−12.6
Labor hold		Swing	+12.6	

=== Canterbury ===
1978 New South Wales state election: Canterbury
Party	Candidate	Votes	%	±%
Labor	Kevin Stewart	22,519	76.0	+11.7
Liberal	Marjorie Pennington	7,104	24.0	−11.7
Total formal votes		29,623	95.8	−1.0
Informal votes		1,290	4.2	+1.0
Turnout		30,913	92.2	−0.4
Labor hold		Swing	+11.7	

=== Casino ===
1978 New South Wales state election: Casino
Party	Candidate	Votes	%	±%
Labor	Don Day	12,937	57.8	+7.9
National Country	Colin Sullivan	6,173	27.6	+27.6
National Country	William Marshall	2,895	12.9	+12.9
Independent	Peter Den Exter	367	1.6	+1.6
Total formal votes		22,372	98.8	−0.3
Informal votes		273	1.2	+0.3
Turnout		22,645	94.5	−0.1
Two-party-preferred result
Labor	Don Day	13,345	59.7	+8.1
National Country	Colin Sullivan	9,025	40.3	−8.1
Labor hold		Swing	+8.1	

=== Castlereagh ===
1978 New South Wales state election: Castlereagh
Party	Candidate	Votes	%	±%
Labor	Jack Renshaw	11,173	56.2	+5.0
National Country	John Hickmott	7,688	38.7	+1.7
Liberal	John Browne	1,020	5.1	−6.7
Total formal votes		19,881	98.5	−0.6
Informal votes		294	1.5	+0.6
Turnout		20,175	92.3	−1.4
Two-party-preferred result
Labor	Jack Renshaw	11,320	56.9	+4.6
National Country	John Hickmott	8,561	43.1	−4.6
Labor hold		Swing	+4.6	

=== Cessnock ===
1978 New South Wales state election: Cessnock
Party	Candidate	Votes	%	±%
Labor	Bob Brown	18,547	79.1	+2.1
Liberal	Terrence Nicholas	4,894	20.9	−2.1
Total formal votes		23,441	98.4	−0.3
Informal votes		389	1.6	+0.3
Turnout		23,830	95.6	−0.4
Labor hold		Swing	+2.1	

=== Charlestown ===
1978 New South Wales state election: Charlestown
Party	Candidate	Votes	%	±%
Labor	Richard Face	22,379	67.4	+5.7
Liberal	Richard Bevan	10,821	32.6	−5.7
Total formal votes		33,200	98.1	−0.5
Informal votes		628	1.9	+0.5
Turnout		33,828	95.0	−0.3
Labor hold		Swing	+5.7	

=== Clarence ===
1978 New South Wales state election: Clarence
Party	Candidate	Votes	%	±%
National Country	Matt Singleton	15,061	52.5	−11.2
Labor	Danny Signor	8,821	30.7	−5.6
Independent	John Kelly	4,819	16.8	+16.8
Total formal votes		28,701	98.6	−0.1
Informal votes		418	1.4	+0.1
Turnout		29,119	93.3	−0.7
Two-party-preferred result
National Country	Matt Singleton	17,471	60.9	−2.8
Labor	Danny Signor	11,230	39.1	+2.8
National Country hold		Swing	−2.8	

=== Coogee ===
1978 New South Wales state election: Coogee
Party	Candidate	Votes	%	±%
Labor	Michael Cleary	17,893	63.4	+9.7
Liberal	David Kinsman	9,059	32.1	−14.2
Democrats	Leslie Reiss	1,254	4.5	+4.5
Total formal votes		28,206	97.8	−0.1
Informal votes		625	2.2	+0.1
Turnout		28,831	88.6	−1.1
Two-party-preferred result
Labor	Michael Cleary	18,729	66.4	+12.7
Liberal	David Kinsman	9,477	33.6	−12.7
Labor hold		Swing	+12.7	

=== Corrimal ===
1978 New South Wales state election: Corrimal
Party	Candidate	Votes	%	±%
Labor	Laurie Kelly	20,694	67.8	+4.7
Liberal	Peter Atkins	7,682	25.2	−11.7
Democrats	Leslie Scott	2,129	7.0	+7.0
Total formal votes		30,505	97.7	+0.1
Informal votes		709	2.3	−0.1
Turnout		31,214	94.3	−0.2
Two-party-preferred result
Labor	Laurie Kelly	22,113	72.5	+9.4
Liberal	Peter Atkins	8,392	27.5	−9.4
Labor hold		Swing	+9.4	

=== Cronulla ===
1978 New South Wales state election: Cronulla
Party	Candidate	Votes	%	±%
Labor	Michael Egan	18,029	58.6	+13.5
Liberal	Dennis Porter	12,749	41.4	−9.8
Total formal votes		30,778	98.1	−0.8
Informal votes		603	1.9	+0.8
Turnout		31,381	93.2	−0.8
Labor gain from Liberal		Swing	+12.4	

=== Davidson ===
1978 New South Wales state election: Davidson
Party	Candidate	Votes	%	±%
Liberal	Dick Healey	16,326	57.4	−9.0
Labor	Christopher Lennon	12,105	42.6	+9.0
Total formal votes		28,431	98.2	−0.2
Informal votes		522	1.8	+0.2
Turnout		28,953	93.2	−1.4
Liberal hold		Swing	−9.0	

=== Drummoyne ===
1978 New South Wales state election: Drummoyne
Party	Candidate	Votes	%	±%
Labor	Michael Maher	19,883	68.9	+12.6
Liberal	William Rowlings	8,974	31.1	−9.3
Total formal votes		28,857	97.0	−1.2
Informal votes		887	3.0	+1.2
Turnout		29,744	92.6	−1.0
Labor hold		Swing	+11.6	

=== Dubbo ===
1978 New South Wales state election: Dubbo
Party	Candidate	Votes	%	±%
Liberal	John Mason	13,741	53.4	+13.0
Labor	Roger Grealy	11,998	46.6	+15.2
Total formal votes		25,739	98.2	−1.1
Informal votes		470	1.8	+1.1
Turnout		26,209	94.2	−0.4
Liberal hold		Swing	−10.0	

=== Earlwood ===
1978 New South Wales state election: Earlwood
Party	Candidate	Votes	%	±%
Labor	Ken Gabb	18,647	60.1	+14.6
Liberal	Alan Jones	11,725	37.8	−16.7
Independent	Charles Bingle	667	2.1	+2.1
Total formal votes		31,039	98.1	−0.4
Informal votes		596	1.9	+0.4
Turnout		31,635	94.4	−0.9
Two-party-preferred result
Labor	Ken Gabb	19,114	61.6	+16.1
Liberal	Alan Jones	11,925	38.4	−16.1
Labor gain from Liberal		Swing	+16.1	

Sir Eric Willis (Liberal) resigned on 16 June 1978 and Ken Gabb (Labor) won the resulting by-election, holding the seat at this election.

=== East Hills ===
1978 New South Wales state election: East Hills
Party	Candidate	Votes	%	±%
Labor	Pat Rogan	22,645	73.2	+8.4
Liberal	Nefra Clarke	6,793	22.0	−13.2
Democrats	Paul Terrett	1,479	4.8	+4.8
Total formal votes		30,917	98.3	0.0
Informal votes		545	1.7	0.0
Turnout		31,462	94.8	−0.1
Two-party-preferred result
Labor	Pat Rogan	23,385	75.6	+10.8
Liberal	Nefra Clarke	7,532	24.4	−10.8
Labor hold		Swing	+10.8	

=== Eastwood ===
1978 New South Wales state election: Eastwood
Party	Candidate	Votes	%	±%
Liberal	Jim Clough	15,715	51.4	−13.3
Labor	Jan Murray	12,992	42.5	+7.2
Democrats	Phillip Cockell	1,846	6.0	+6.0
Total formal votes		30,553	98.3	−0.5
Informal votes		537	1.7	+0.5
Turnout		31,090	92.8	−1.4
Two-party-preferred result
Liberal	Jim Clough	16,638	54.5	−10.2
Labor	Jan Murray	13,915	45.5	+10.2
Liberal hold		Swing	−10.2	

=== Fairfield ===
1978 New South Wales state election: Fairfield
Party	Candidate	Votes	%	±%
Labor	Eric Bedford	23,294	75.4	+6.2
Liberal	Charles Rogers	5,544	17.9	−12.9
Democrats	Frank Havlan	2,046	6.6	+6.6
Total formal votes		30,884	95.5	−1.1
Informal votes		1,458	4.5	+1.1
Turnout		32,342	92.8	−0.8
Two-party-preferred result
Labor	Eric Bedford	24,215	78.4	+9.3
Liberal	Charles Rogers	6,669	21.6	−9.3
Labor hold		Swing	+9.3	

=== Fuller ===
1978 New South Wales state election: Fuller
Party	Candidate	Votes	%	±%
Labor	Rodney Cavalier	16,049	53.3	+9.0
Liberal	Peter Coleman	12,470	41.4	−10.8
Democrats	Shirley Berg	1,569	5.2	+5.2
Total formal votes		30,088	98.2	−0.5
Informal votes		551	1.8	+0.5
Turnout		30,639	93.8	+0.1
Two-party-preferred result
Labor	Rodney Cavalier	16,638	55.3	+8.7
Liberal	Peter Coleman	13,450	44.7	−8.7
Labor gain from Liberal		Swing	+8.7	

=== Georges River ===
1978 New South Wales state election: Georges River
Party	Candidate	Votes	%	±%
Labor	Frank Walker	20,626	65.2	+12.4
Liberal	John Lyon	9,847	31.1	−16.1
Democrats	Montague Greene	1,156	3.7	+3.7
Total formal votes		31,629	98.4	−0.2
Informal votes		514	1.6	+0.2
Turnout		32,143	94.4	−1.1
Two-party-preferred result
Labor	Frank Walker	21,204	67.0	+14.2
Liberal	John Lyon	10,425	33.0	−14.2
Labor hold		Swing	+14.2	

=== Gloucester ===
1978 New South Wales state election: Gloucester
Party	Candidate	Votes	%	±%
National Country	Leon Punch	14,265	55.4	−6.2
Labor	Ronald Aiken	9,551	37.1	+7.8
Independent	Bruce MacKenzie	1,942	7.5	+7.5
Total formal votes		25,758	98.5	−0.6
Informal votes		404	1.5	+0.6
Turnout		26,162	93.9	+0.1
Two-party-preferred result
National Country	Leon Punch	15,236	59.2	−10.0
Labor	Ronald Aiken	10,522	40.8	+10.0
National Country hold		Swing	−10.0	

=== Gordon ===
1978 New South Wales state election: Gordon
Party	Candidate	Votes	%	±%
Liberal	Tim Moore	18,925	69.2	+4.3
Labor	Arthur Litchfield	6,530	23.9	+7.1
Democrats	Ilse Robey	1,879	6.9	+6.9
Total formal votes		27,334	98.4	−0.4
Informal votes		429	1.6	+0.4
Turnout		27,763	90.9	−2.3
Two-party-preferred result
Liberal	Tim Moore	20,215	74.0	−7.5
Labor	Arthur Litchfield	7,119	26.0	+7.5
Liberal hold		Swing	−7.5	

=== Gosford ===
1978 New South Wales state election: Gosford
Party	Candidate	Votes	%	±%
Labor	Brian McGowan	19,282	57.4	+9.1
Liberal	Andrew Fennell	12,539	37.3	−11.6
Democrats	John Cleverly	1,636	4.9	+4.9
Independent	Stanley Williams	128	0.4	+0.4
Total formal votes		33,585	98.9	0.0
Informal votes		384	1.1	0.0
Turnout		33,969	94.2	−0.5
Two-party-preferred result
Labor	Brian McGowan	20,001	59.6	+9.5
Liberal	Andrew Fennell	13,584	40.4	−9.5
Labor hold		Swing	+9.5	

=== Goulburn ===
1978 New South Wales state election: Goulburn
Party	Candidate	Votes	%	±%
National Country	Ron Brewer	11,353	49.8	−4.8
Labor	Brian Lulham	10,945	48.1	+2.7
Democrats	Gregory Butler	479	2.1	+2.1
Total formal votes		22,777	98.8	−0.3
Informal votes		268	1.2	+0.3
Turnout		23,045	95.3	+0.1
Two-party-preferred result
National Country	Ron Brewer	11,592	50.9	−3.7
Labor	Brian Lulham	11,185	49.1	+3.7
National Country hold		Swing	−3.7	

=== Granville ===
1978 New South Wales state election: Granville
Party	Candidate	Votes	%	±%
Labor	Pat Flaherty	20,058	71.4	+2.6
Liberal	Florence Maio	5,245	18.7	−12.5
Democrats	Ronald Harrison	1,881	6.7	+6.7
Socialist Workers	Paul Petit	925	3.3	+3.3
Total formal votes		28,109	96.8	−0.9
Informal votes		932	3.2	+0.9
Turnout		29,041	93.1	−1.1
Two-party-preferred result
Labor	Pat Flaherty	22,085	78.6	+9.8
Liberal	Florence Maio	6,024	21.4	−9.8
Labor hold		Swing	+9.8	

=== Hawkesbury ===
1978 New South Wales state election: Hawkesbury
Party	Candidate	Votes	%	±%
Liberal	Kevin Rozzoli	19,823	55.2	−5.6
Labor	Alwyn Lindfield	16,061	44.8	+5.6
Total formal votes		35,884	97.1	−1.0
Informal votes		1,083	2.9	+1.0
Turnout		36,967	92.1	+0.7
Liberal hold		Swing	−5.6	

=== Heathcote ===
1978 New South Wales state election: Heathcote
Party	Candidate	Votes	%	±%
Labor	Rex Jackson	22,707	72.4	+9.2
Liberal	Ron Phillips	6,906	22.0	−14.8
Democrats	James Dredge	1,760	5.6	+5.6
Total formal votes		31,373	98.4	0.0
Informal votes		523	1.6	0.0
Turnout		31,896	94.5	−0.3
Two-party-preferred result
Labor	Rex Jackson	23,567	75.2	+12.0
Liberal	Ron Phillips	7,780	24.8	−12.0
Labor hold		Swing	+12.0	

=== Heffron ===
1978 New South Wales state election: Heffron
Party	Candidate	Votes	%	±%
Labor	Laurie Brereton	23,531	80.0	+16.9
Liberal	George Balos	5,871	20.0	−9.2
Total formal votes		29,402	95.8	−1.7
Informal votes		1,281	4.2	+1.7
Turnout		30,683	91.9	+1.8
Labor hold		Swing	+10.2	

=== Hornsby ===
1978 New South Wales state election: Hornsby
Party	Candidate	Votes	%	±%
Liberal	Neil Pickard	16,769	50.8	−10.8
Labor	Christopher Gorrick	16,207	49.2	+10.8
Total formal votes		32,976	97.4	−0.7
Informal votes		887	2.6	+0.7
Turnout		33,863	92.3	−3.0
Liberal hold		Swing	−10.8	

=== Hurstville ===
1978 New South Wales state election: Hurstville
Party	Candidate	Votes	%	±%
Labor	Kevin Ryan	19,296	63.7	+15.1
Liberal	Ian Brown	10,984	36.3	−12.5
Total formal votes		30,280	98.1	−0.7
Informal votes		593	1.9	+0.7
Turnout		30,873	93.5	−0.1
Labor hold		Swing	+13.6	

=== Illawarra ===
1978 New South Wales state election: Illawarra
Party	Candidate	Votes	%	±%
Labor	George Petersen	24,398	68.5	+2.7
Liberal	Malcolm Yates	6,302	17.7	+17.7
Democrats	William Speirs	4,924	13.8	+13.8
Total formal votes		35,624	97.5	−0.6
Informal votes		896	2.5	+0.6
Turnout		36,520	94.8	+0.8
Two-party-preferred result
Labor	George Petersen	27,845	78.2	+4.9
Liberal	Malcolm Yates	7,779	21.8	+21.8
Labor hold		Swing	+4.9	

=== Kirribilli ===
1978 New South Wales state election: Kirribilli
Party	Candidate	Votes	%	±%
Liberal	Bruce McDonald	11,965	53.8	+11.2
Labor	Glen Batchelor	10,280	46.2	+9.8
Total formal votes		22,245	96.9	−1.7
Informal votes		712	3.1	+1.7
Turnout		22,957	86.6	−2.4
Liberal hold		Swing	−7.3	

=== Kogarah ===
1978 New South Wales state election: Kogarah
Party	Candidate	Votes	%	±%
Labor	Bill Crabtree	21,397	67.9	+12.5
Liberal	Terrence Fraser	10,117	32.1	−10.1
Total formal votes		31,514	97.2	−0.4
Informal votes		897	2.8	+0.4
Turnout		32,411	93.0	−1.3
Labor hold		Swing	+11.8	

=== Ku-ring-gai ===
1978 New South Wales state election: Ku-ring-gai
Party	Candidate	Votes	%	±%
Liberal	John Maddison	19,350	65.5	−7.5
Labor	Ian Cameron	10,205	34.5	+14.1
Total formal votes		29,555	98.0	−0.9
Informal votes		592	2.0	+0.9
Turnout		30,147	91.0	−1.5
Liberal hold		Swing	−12.2	

=== Lake Macquarie ===
1978 New South Wales state election: Lake Macquarie
Party	Candidate	Votes	%	±%
Labor	Merv Hunter	22,403	71.2	+6.8
Liberal	Oliver Fennell	7,633	24.3	−11.3
Democrats	Lyn Godfrey	1,424	4.5	+4.5
Total formal votes		31,460	98.0	−0.5
Informal votes		627	2.0	+0.5
Turnout		32,087	93.7	−0.7
Two-party-preferred result
Labor	Merv Hunter	23,115	73.5	+9.1
Liberal	Oliver Fennell	8,345	26.5	−9.1
Labor hold		Swing	+9.1	

=== Lakemba ===
1978 New South Wales state election: Lakemba
Party	Candidate	Votes	%	±%
Labor	Vince Durick	23,463	74.9	+15.1
Liberal	Robin Graham	6,689	21.4	−12.3
Democrats	Brenda Adams	1,155	3.7	+3.7
Total formal votes		31,307	97.1	−0.9
Informal votes		938	2.9	+0.9
Turnout		32,245	93.1	−2.0
Two-party-preferred result
Labor	Vince Durick	23,805	77.0	+12.3
Liberal	Robin Graham	7,100	23.0	−12.3
Labor hold		Swing	+12.3	

=== Lane Cove ===
1978 New South Wales state election: Lane Cove
Party	Candidate	Votes	%	±%
Liberal	John Dowd	15,025	52.2	−13.0
Labor	Elizabeth Bishop	11,359	39.5	+8.6
Democrats	John Newman	2,380	8.3	+8.3
Total formal votes		28,764	98.1	−0.6
Informal votes		552	1.9	+0.6
Turnout		29,316	90.7	−1.8
Two-party-preferred result
Liberal	John Dowd	16,548	57.5	−8.9
Labor	Elizabeth Bishop	12,216	42.5	+8.9
Liberal hold		Swing	−8.9	

=== Lismore ===
1978 New South Wales state election: Lismore
Party	Candidate	Votes	%	±%
National Country	Bruce Duncan	15,144	60.6	−39.4
Labor	William Slade	8,262	33.1	+33.1
Democrats	Shirley Ryan	1,567	6.3	+6.3
Total formal votes		24,973	98.8	
Informal votes		298	1.2	
Turnout		25,271	93.8	
Two-party-preferred result
National Country	Bruce Duncan	15,927	63.8	−36.2
Labor	William Slade	9,046	36.2	+36.2
National Country hold		Swing	−36.2	

=== Liverpool ===
1978 New South Wales state election: Liverpool
Party	Candidate	Votes	%	±%
Labor	George Paciullo	26,129	77.8	+8.2
Liberal	John Books	5,454	16.2	−14.2
Democrats	Raymond Benn	1,993	5.9	+5.9
Total formal votes		33,576	96.9	−0.2
Informal votes		1,063	3.1	+0.2
Turnout		34,639	93.1	−0.9
Two-party-preferred result
Labor	George Paciullo	27,125	80.8	+11.2
Liberal	John Books	6,451	19.2	−11.2
Labor hold		Swing	+11.2	

=== Maitland ===
1978 New South Wales state election: Maitland
Party	Candidate	Votes	%	±%
Liberal	Milton Morris	14,800	54.3	−5.5
Labor	Noel Unicomb	12,435	45.7	+5.5
Total formal votes		27,235	98.5	−0.2
Informal votes		419	1.5	+0.2
Turnout		27,654	96.2	+0.8
Liberal hold		Swing	−5.5	

=== Manly ===
1978 New South Wales state election: Manly
Party	Candidate	Votes	%	±%
Labor	Alan Stewart	14,670	51.4	+9.1
Liberal	George Ashley	12,489	43.7	−14.0
Democrats	John McGruer	948	3.3	+3.3
Independent	Anthony Dorney	460	1.6	+1.6
Total formal votes		28,567	97.7	−0.1
Informal votes		678	2.3	+0.1
Turnout		29,245	91.1	−0.7
Two-party-preferred result
Labor	Alan Stewart	15,374	53.8	+11.5
Liberal	George Ashley	13,193	46.2	−11.5
Labor gain from Liberal		Swing	+11.5	

=== Maroubra ===
1978 New South Wales state election: Maroubra
Party	Candidate	Votes	%	±%
Labor	Bill Haigh	20,739	70.3	+8.2
Liberal	Kenneth Findlay	7,443	25.2	−10.0
Democrats	Ronald Brewer	1,318	4.5	+4.5
Total formal votes		29,500	97.2	−0.9
Informal votes		846	2.8	+0.9
Turnout		30,346	92.4	+0.3
Two-party-preferred result
Labor	Bill Haigh	21,398	72.5	+8.5
Liberal	Kenneth Findlay	8,102	27.5	−8.5
Labor hold		Swing	+8.5	

=== Marrickville ===
1978 New South Wales state election: Marrickville
Party	Candidate	Votes	%	±%
Labor	Tom Cahill	22,667	74.2	+2.2
Liberal	Costa Lianos	5,769	18.9	−6.1
Socialist	David Gibson	2,115	6.9	+6.9
Total formal votes		30,551	95.3	−1.3
Informal votes		1,505	4.7	+1.3
Turnout		32,056	88.2	−0.5
Two-party-preferred result
Labor	Tom Cahill	24,327	79.8	+5.5
Liberal	Costa Lianos	6,158	20.2	−5.5
Labor hold		Swing	+5.5	

=== Merrylands ===
1978 New South Wales state election: Merrylands
Party	Candidate	Votes	%	±%
Labor	Jack Ferguson	25,469	76.4	+11.3
Liberal	John Melouney	6,426	19.3	−15.6
Democrats	Norma Wade	1,447	4.3	+4.3
Total formal votes		33,342	97.0	−0.5
Informal votes		1,046	3.0	+0.5
Turnout		34,388	93.9	−0.5
Two-party-preferred result
Labor	Jack Ferguson	26,193	78.6	+13.5
Liberal	John Melouney	7,149	21.4	−13.5
Labor hold		Swing	+13.5	

=== Miranda ===
1978 New South Wales state election: Miranda
Party	Candidate	Votes	%	±%
Labor	Bill Robb	16,667	53.5	+7.5
Liberal	Tim Walker	12,949	41.5	−12.5
Democrats	William Sibley	1,557	5.0	+5.0
Total formal votes		31,173	98.6	0.0
Informal votes		446	1.4	0.0
Turnout		31,619	94.4	+3.4
Two-party-preferred result
Labor	Bill Robb	17,627	56.5	+10.5
Liberal	Tim Walker	13,546	43.5	−10.5
Labor gain from Liberal		Swing	+10.5	

=== Monaro ===
1978 New South Wales state election: Monaro
Party	Candidate	Votes	%	±%
Labor	John Akister	13,234	56.4	+7.8
Liberal	John Ballesty	4,884	20.8	−6.7
National Country	Thomas Barry	4,529	19.3	−4.6
Independent	Graham Edwards	821	3.5	+3.5
Total formal votes		23,468	97.9	−0.5
Informal votes		497	2.1	+0.5
Turnout		23,965	91.4	0.0
Two-party-preferred result
Labor	John Akister	13,921	59.3	+7.8
Liberal	John Ballesty	9,547	40.7	−7.8
Labor hold		Swing	+7.8	

=== Mosman ===
1978 New South Wales state election: Mosman
Party	Candidate	Votes	%	±%
Liberal	David Arblaster	16,174	61.8	−6.8
Labor	Elizabeth Hood	9,985	38.2	+11.8
Total formal votes		26,159	98.0	−0.9
Informal votes		537	2.0	+0.9
Turnout		26,696	89.8	−2.4
Liberal hold		Swing	−8.3	

=== Mount Druitt ===
1978 New South Wales state election: Mount Druitt
Party	Candidate	Votes	%	±%
Labor	Tony Johnson	25,055	77.9	+10.5
Liberal	Thomas Rands	4,726	14.7	−17.9
Communist	Victoria Wootten	2,391	7.4	+7.4
Total formal votes		32,172	96.5	+0.1
Informal votes		1,150	3.5	−0.1
Turnout		33,322	93.4	−0.8
Two-party-preferred result
Labor	Tony Johnson	26,090	81.1	+13.8
Liberal	Thomas Rands	6,082	18.9	−13.8
Labor hold		Swing	+13.8	

=== Munmorah ===
1978 New South Wales state election: Munmorah
Party	Candidate	Votes	%	±%
Labor	Harry Jensen	25,293	77.3	+8.8
Liberal	Brian Taylor	7,426	22.7	−8.8
Total formal votes		32,719	98.1	−0.5
Informal votes		626	1.9	+0.5
Turnout		33,345	93.5	−1.5
Labor hold		Swing	+8.8	

=== Murray ===
1978 New South Wales state election: Murray
Party	Candidate	Votes	%	±%
Liberal	Mary Meillon	8,228	43.4	+4.6
Labor	Brian Oates	4,675	24.7	−1.1
Independent	Gregory Graham	4,277	22.7	−1.4
Labor	Robert Allen	1,762	9.3	+9.3
Total formal votes		18,964	97.6	−1.1
Informal votes		467	2.4	+1.1
Turnout		19,431	88.0	−1.2
Two-party-preferred result
Liberal	Mary Meillon	11,396	60.1	−2.5
Labor	Brian Oates	7,568	39.9	+39.9
Liberal hold		Swing	−2.5	

=== Murrumbidgee ===
1978 New South Wales state election: Murrumbidgee
Party	Candidate	Votes	%	±%
Labor	Lin Gordon	12,122	55.5	+4.2
National Country	John Sullivan	5,619	25.7	+5.9
Independent	Thomas Marriott	2,271	10.4	+10.4
Liberal	Harold Bancroft	1,817	8.3	−20.6
Total formal votes		21,829	98.3	−0.2
Informal votes		385	1.7	+0.2
Turnout		22,214	93.3	−0.5
Two-party-preferred result
Labor	Lin Gordon	13,006	59.6	+5.9
National Country	John Sullivan	8,823	40.4	−5.9
Labor hold		Swing	+5.9	

=== Nepean ===
1978 New South Wales state election: Nepean
Party	Candidate	Votes	%	±%
Labor	Peter Anderson	20,720	56.1	+5.0
Liberal	Ron Rofe	14,466	39.2	−5.7
Democrats	Ronald Edwards	1,752	4.7	+4.7
Total formal votes		36,938	98.4	−0.3
Informal votes		602	1.6	+0.3
Turnout		37,540	93.6	+0.1
Two-party-preferred result
Labor	Peter Anderson	21,596	58.5	+10.8
Liberal	Ron Rofe	15,342	41.5	−10.8
Labor gain from Liberal		Swing	+10.8	

=== Newcastle ===
1978 New South Wales state election: Newcastle
Party	Candidate	Votes	%	±%
Labor	Arthur Wade	18,023	72.3	+4.6
Liberal	Elaine Samuels	6,921	27.7	−4.6
Total formal votes		24,944	97.7	−0.5
Informal votes		579	2.3	+0.5
Turnout		25,523	93.4	−0.5
Labor hold		Swing	+4.6	

=== Northcott ===
1978 New South Wales state election: Northcott
Party	Candidate	Votes	%	±%
Liberal	Jim Cameron	17,784	54.5	−13.7
Labor	Kristine Klugman	12,969	39.7	+7.9
Democrats	Graham Blackman	1,900	5.8	+5.8
Total formal votes		32,653	98.6	0.0
Informal votes		460	1.4	0.0
Turnout		33,113	93.2	+0.3
Two-party-preferred result
Liberal	Jim Cameron	18,734	57.4	−10.8
Labor	Kristine Klugman	13,919	42.6	+10.8
Liberal hold		Swing	−10.8	

=== Orange ===
1978 New South Wales state election: Orange
Party	Candidate	Votes	%	±%
National Country	Garry West	12,539	51.7	−8.1
Labor	Harold Gartrell	11,730	48.3	+8.1
Total formal votes		24,269	98.1	−0.7
Informal votes		461	1.9	+0.7
Turnout		24,730	94.5	+0.2
National Country hold		Swing	−8.1	

=== Oxley ===
1978 New South Wales state election: Oxley
Party	Candidate	Votes	%	±%
National Country	Bruce Cowan	16,497	62.5	−6.7
Labor	John Eastman	9,901	37.5	+6.7
Total formal votes		26,398	98.5	−0.3
Informal votes		388	1.5	+0.3
Turnout		26,786	94.7	−0.4
National Country hold		Swing	−6.7	

=== Parramatta ===
1978 New South Wales state election: Parramatta
Party	Candidate	Votes	%	±%
Labor	Barry Wilde	20,340	67.4	+11.1
Liberal	Roy McAuley	8,885	29.5	−11.1
Democrats	Stephen Mason	936	3.1	+3.1
Total formal votes		30,161	97.6	−0.7
Informal votes		744	2.4	+0.7
Turnout		30,905	91.7	−0.3
Two-party-preferred result
Labor	Barry Wilde	20,809	69.0	+11.8
Liberal	Roy McAuley	9,352	31.0	−11.8
Labor hold		Swing	+11.8	

=== Peats ===
1978 New South Wales state election: Peats
Party	Candidate	Votes	%	±%
Labor	Keith O'Connell	24,692	68.3	+9.6
Liberal	Robert Hanington	8,788	24.3	−17.0
Independent	Barry Phillips	1,489	4.1	+4.1
Democrats	Ray Griffiths	1,174	3.3	+3.3
Total formal votes		36,143	97.8	−0.5
Informal votes		795	2.2	+0.5
Turnout		36,938	93.5	−1.1
Two-party-preferred result
Labor	Keith O'Connell	25,578	70.8	+12.1
Liberal	Robert Hanington	10,565	29.2	−12.1
Labor hold		Swing	+12.1	

=== Penrith ===
1978 New South Wales state election: Penrith
Party	Candidate	Votes	%	±%
Labor	Ron Mulock	28,018	76.2	+16.6
Liberal	Geoffrey Saunders	8,745	23.8	−10.7
Total formal votes		36,763	97.0	−1.3
Informal votes		1,145	3.0	+1.3
Turnout		37,908	93.3	−1.3
Labor hold		Swing	+12.3	

=== Phillip ===
1978 New South Wales state election: Phillip
Party	Candidate	Votes	%	±%
Labor	Pat Hills	18,450	72.4	+2.9
Liberal	Philip Daley	4,873	19.1	−3.5
Communist	Judy Mundey	1,262	5.0	−0.7
Socialist Workers	Gordon Adler	895	3.5	+1.3
Total formal votes		25,480	96.1	−0.8
Informal votes		1,043	3.9	+0.8
Turnout		26,523	85.2	+0.8
Two-party-preferred result
Labor	Pat Hills	20,320	79.7	+3.7
Liberal	Philip Daley	5,160	20.3	−3.7
Labor hold		Swing	+3.7	

=== Pittwater ===
1978 New South Wales state election: Pittwater
Party	Candidate	Votes	%	±%
Liberal	Max Smith	12,707	46.0	−15.2
Labor	Charles Wild	11,220	40.6	+10.8
Independent	John Webeck	2,924	10.6	+10.6
Democrats	Kerry Warr	777	2.8	+2.8
Total formal votes		27,628	97.3	−1.4
Informal votes		764	2.7	+1.4
Turnout		28,392	90.2	−1.8
Two-party-preferred result
Liberal	Max Smith	14,205	51.4	−13.8
Labor	Charles Wild	13,423	48.6	+13.8
Liberal hold		Swing	−13.8	

=== Raleigh ===
1978 New South Wales state election: Raleigh
Party	Candidate	Votes	%	±%
National Country	Jim Brown	13,584	55.3	−8.0
Labor	Joseph Moran	10,975	44.7	+8.0
Total formal votes		24,559	98.8	0.0
Informal votes		306	1.2	0.0
Turnout		24,865	94.4	−0.5
National Country hold		Swing	−8.0	

=== Rockdale ===
1978 New South Wales state election: Rockdale
Party	Candidate	Votes	%	±%
Labor	Brian Bannon	21,643	75.2	+8.7
Liberal	Joan Loew	5,651	19.6	−13.9
Independent	Edwin Bellchambers	1,501	5.2	+5.2
Total formal votes		28,795	96.8	−0.4
Informal votes		953	3.2	+0.4
Turnout		29,748	92.3	−1.1
Two-party-preferred result
Labor	Brian Bannon	22,943	79.7	+13.2
Liberal	Joan Loew	5,852	20.3	−13.2
Labor hold		Swing	+13.2	

=== South Coast ===
1978 New South Wales state election: South Coast
Party	Candidate	Votes	%	±%
Independent	John Hatton	21,895	70.5	+5.0
Liberal	Peter Ryan	9,160	29.5	−3.6
Total formal votes		31,055	98.4	−0.6
Informal votes		505	1.6	+0.6
Turnout		31,560	93.7	+0.2
Independent hold		Swing	+4.3	

=== Sturt ===
1978 New South Wales state election: Sturt
Party	Candidate	Votes	%	±%
National Country	Tim Fischer	13,603	66.0	−2.8
Labor	Michael Anthony	6,995	34.0	+2.8
Total formal votes		20,598	98.7	−0.4
Informal votes		280	1.3	+0.4
Turnout		20,878	93.8	−0.6
National Country hold		Swing	−2.8	

=== Tamworth ===
1978 New South Wales state election: Tamworth
Party	Candidate	Votes	%	±%
National Country	Noel Park	13,033	49.6	−13.2
Labor	William Forrest	11,114	42.3	+5.1
Democrats	Peter McLoughlin	1,564	6.0	+6.0
Independent	Noel Cassel	564	2.1	+2.1
Total formal votes		26,275	98.6	0.0
Informal votes		362	1.4	0.0
Turnout		26,637	94.9	+0.4
Two-party-preferred result
National Country	Noel Park	14,002	53.3	−9.5
Labor	William Forrest	12,273	46.7	+9.5
National Country hold		Swing	−9.5	

=== Temora ===
1978 New South Wales state election: Temora
Party	Candidate	Votes	%	±%
National Country	Jim Taylor	12,872	67.6	−0.1
Labor	Alroy Provan	6,154	32.4	+2.7
Total formal votes		19,026	98.4	−0.9
Informal votes		301	1.6	+0.9
Turnout		19,327	93.4	−1.2
National Country hold		Swing	−1.5	

=== Tenterfield ===
1978 New South Wales state election: Tenterfield
Party	Candidate	Votes	%	±%
National Country	Tim Bruxner	11,819	59.4	−6.6
Labor	Jim Curran	8,093	40.6	+6.6
Total formal votes		19,912	98.6	−0.2
Informal votes		274	1.4	+0.2
Turnout		20,186	93.4	−0.2
National Country hold		Swing	−6.6	

=== The Hills ===
1978 New South Wales state election: The Hills
Party	Candidate	Votes	%	±%
Liberal	Fred Caterson	16,789	52.2	−12.9
Labor	Paul Gibson	13,851	43.1	+8.2
Democrats	Robert Blackman	1,509	4.7	+4.7
Total formal votes		32,149	98.5	−0.2
Informal votes		504	1.5	+0.2
Turnout		32,653	94.1	−1.5
Two-party-preferred result
Liberal	Fred Caterson	17,544	54.6	−10.6
Labor	Paul Gibson	14,605	45.4	+10.6
Liberal hold		Swing	−10.6	

=== Upper Hunter ===
1978 New South Wales state election: Upper Hunter
Party	Candidate	Votes	%	±%
National Country	Col Fisher	13,818	54.4	−8.3
Labor	Ronald Brumpton	11,597	45.6	+8.3
Total formal votes		25,415	98.3	−0.3
Informal votes		436	1.7	+0.3
Turnout		25,851	95.2	+0.1
National Country hold		Swing	−8.3	

=== Vaucluse ===
1978 New South Wales state election: Vaucluse
Party	Candidate	Votes	%	±%
Liberal	Rosemary Foot	12,643	49.4	−14.2
Labor	Barbara Fuller-Quinn	10,977	42.9	+6.5
Democrats	Norman Majer	1,984	7.7	+7.7
Total formal votes		25,604	96.7	−0.4
Informal votes		882	3.3	+0.4
Turnout		26,486	88.6	−0.4
Two-party-preferred result
Liberal	Rosemary Foot	13,965	54.5	−9.1
Labor	Barbara Fuller-Quinn	11,639	45.5	+9.1
Liberal hold		Swing	−9.1	

=== Wagga Wagga ===
1978 New South Wales state election: Wagga Wagga
Party	Candidate	Votes	%	±%
Liberal	Joe Schipp	12,354	52.1	−6.7
Labor	Thomas Watson	10,547	44.5	+3.3
Independent	Anthony Robinson	802	3.4	+3.4
Total formal votes		23,703	98.5	−0.3
Informal votes		354	1.5	+0.3
Turnout		24,057	92.6	−1.3
Two-party-preferred result
Liberal	Joe Schipp	12,620	53.8	−5.0
Labor	Thomas Watson	10,859	46.2	+5.0
Liberal hold		Swing	−5.0	

=== Wakehurst ===
1978 New South Wales state election: Wakehurst
Party	Candidate	Votes	%	±%
Labor	Tom Webster	17,066	56.2	+14.0
Liberal	Allan Viney	13,329	43.8	−14.0
Total formal votes		30,395	97.0	−0.7
Informal votes		938	3.0	+0.7
Turnout		31,333	91.5	−0.2
Labor gain from Liberal		Swing	+14.0	

=== Wallsend ===
1978 New South Wales state election: Wallsend
Party	Candidate	Votes	%	±%
Labor	Ken Booth	28,186	79.3	+10.0
Liberal	Denise Martin	7,368	20.7	−10.0
Total formal votes		35,554	98.0	−0.4
Informal votes		723	2.0	+0.4
Turnout		36,277	95.5	−0.2
Labor hold		Swing	+10.0	

=== Waratah ===
1978 New South Wales state election: Waratah
Party	Candidate	Votes	%	±%
Labor	Sam Jones	21,100	72.6	+5.2
Liberal	Beryl Humble	7,006	24.1	−8.5
Communist	Christopher Dodds	941	3.2	+3.2
Total formal votes		29,047	97.7	−0.6
Informal votes		687	2.3	+0.6
Turnout		29,734	94.8	+0.3
Two-party-preferred result
Labor	Sam Jones	21,947	75.6	+8.2
Liberal	Beryl Humble	7,100	24.4	−8.2
Labor hold		Swing	+8.2	

=== Waverley ===
1978 New South Wales state election: Waverley
Party	Candidate	Votes	%	±%
Labor	Syd Einfeld	15,649	65.6	+8.6
Liberal	Margaret Davis	6,543	27.4	−15.6
Independent	Moshe Levy	647	2.7	+2.7
Democrats	Michael Smythe	607	2.6	+2.6
Independent	Christopher Allen	393	1.7	+1.7
Total formal votes		23,839	96.4	−1.0
Informal votes		891	3.6	+1.0
Turnout		24,730	86.2	−1.9
Two-party-preferred result
Labor	Syd Einfeld	16,396	68.8	+11.8
Liberal	Margaret Davis	7,443	31.2	−11.8
Labor hold		Swing	+11.8	

=== Wentworthville ===
1978 New South Wales state election: Wentworthville
Party	Candidate	Votes	%	±%
Labor	Ernie Quinn	24,088	70.9	+12.5
Liberal	Edward Roberts	7,911	23.3	−15.3
Democrats	Peggy Cable	1,997	5.9	+5.9
Total formal votes		33,996	97.5	−0.8
Informal votes		867	2.5	+0.8
Turnout		34,863	94.6	−0.5
Two-party-preferred result
Labor	Ernie Quinn	25,193	74.2	+13.5
Liberal	Edward Roberts	8,773	25.8	−13.5
Labor hold		Swing	+13.5	

=== Willoughby ===
1978 New South Wales state election: Willoughby
Party	Candidate	Votes	%	±%
Liberal	Nick Greiner	10,456	39.8	−23.3
Labor	Eddie Britt	10,015	38.1	+1.2
Independent	Laurie McGinty	4,075	15.5	+15.5
Democrats	Christine Townend	1,748	6.7	+6.7
Total formal votes		26,294	96.9	−0.8
Informal votes		832	3.1	+0.8
Turnout		27,126	90.5	−2.0
Two-party-preferred result
Labor	Eddie Britt	13,359	50.8	+13.9
Liberal	Nick Greiner	12,935	49.2	−13.9
Labor gain from Liberal		Swing	+13.9	

The sitting member for Willoughby, Laurie McGinty (Liberal), lost preselection and contested the election as an Independent.

=== Wollondilly ===
1978 New South Wales state election: Wollondilly
Party	Candidate	Votes	%	±%
Liberal	Peter Reynolds	13,074	43.1	−9.1
Labor	Bill Knott	13,005	42.8	+3.7
Independent	Robert Wilson	2,647	8.7	+8.7
Democrats	Paul Stocker	1,631	5.4	+5.4
Total formal votes		30,357	98.5	−0.2
Informal votes		475	1.5	+0.2
Turnout		30,832	93.5	−0.1
Two-party-preferred result
Labor	Bill Knott	15,313	50.4	+8.0
Liberal	Peter Reynolds	15,044	49.6	−8.0
Labor gain from Liberal		Swing	+8.0	

=== Wollongong ===
1978 New South Wales state election: Wollongong
Party	Candidate	Votes	%	±%
Labor	Eric Ramsay	19,733	69.4	+3.4
Liberal	Ronald Brooks	6,026	21.2	−12.8
Democrats	Ross Sampson	2,072	7.3	+7.3
Socialist Workers	Andrew Jamieson	617	2.2	+2.2
Total formal votes		28,448	96.4	−0.6
Informal votes		1,046	3.6	+0.6
Turnout		29,494	93.2	+0.2
Two-party-preferred result
Labor	Eric Ramsay	21,008	73.8	+7.8
Liberal	Ronald Brooks	7,440	26.2	−7.8
Labor hold		Swing	+7.8	

=== Woronora ===
1978 New South Wales state election: Woronora
Party	Candidate	Votes	%	±%
Labor	Maurie Keane	21,286	66.6	+8.5
Liberal	Brian Hickey	7,973	24.9	−17.0
Democrats	Robert Davis	2,706	8.5	+8.5
Total formal votes		31,965	98.4	−0.1
Informal votes		520	1.6	+0.1
Turnout		32,485	93.1	−1.6
Two-party-preferred result
Labor	Maurie Keane	22,629	70.8	+12.7
Liberal	Brian Hickey	9,326	29.2	−12.7
Labor hold		Swing	+12.7	

=== Yaralla ===
1978 New South Wales state election: Yaralla
Party	Candidate	Votes	%	±%
Labor	Garry McIlwaine	16,219	56.5	+10.9
Liberal	Lerryn Mutton	11,533	40.1	−14.3
Democrats	Christopher Dunkerley	973	3.4	+3.4
Total formal votes		28,725	97.6	−0.2
Informal votes		697	2.4	+0.2
Turnout		29,422	92.5	+1.1
Two-party-preferred result
Labor	Garry McIlwaine	16,706	58.2	+12.6
Liberal	Lerryn Mutton	12,019	41.8	−12.6
Labor gain from Liberal		Swing	+12.6	

=== Young ===
1978 New South Wales state election: Young
Party	Candidate	Votes	%	±%
National Country	George Freudenstein	11,625	53.0	−5.4
Labor	Timothy West	10,287	47.0	+5.4
Total formal votes		21,912	98.4	−0.2
Informal votes		351	1.6	+0.2
Turnout		22,263	94.7	−0.3
National Country hold		Swing	−5.4	

== See also ==
- Candidates of the 1978 New South Wales state election
- Members of the New South Wales Legislative Assembly, 1978–1981

== Bibliography ==
- Hughes, Colin A. (1986). A handbook of Australian government and politics, 1975-1984. ANU Press. ISBN 0-08-033038-X.
