= 1987 Bankstown state by-election =

Election result for Bankstown, New South Wales, Australia

A by-election was held for the New South Wales Legislative Assembly electorate of Bankstown on 31 January 1987 following the resignation of sitting Labor party member, Ric Mochalski who was facing charges over the collapse of a property trust. Mochalski gave the reason for his resignation as ill health, however the NSW Parliamentary Superannuation Fund rejected a claim based on ill health following a report from the NSW Chief Medical Officer.

The Bankstown by-election was held the same day as the Heathcote by-election.

== Dates ==
Date	Event
1 December 1986	Ric Mochalski resigned from parliament.
2 January 1987	Writ of election issued by the Speaker of the Legislative Assembly and close of electoral rolls.
8 January 1987	Nominations
31 January 1987	Polling day
20 February 1987	Return of writ

== Results ==
1987 Bankstown state by-election
Party	Candidate	Votes	%	±%
Labor	Doug Shedden	12,677	43.80	−20.7
Liberal	Terry McDonald	4,336	23.20	−12.3
Independent	Kevin Ryan	5,395	18.64	+18.64
Call to Australia	Elaine Nile	993	3.43	+3.43
Small Business People Group	Norm Axford	641	2.21	+2.21
Democrats	Peter Carver	603	2.08	+2.08
Independent	John Hillman	568	1.96	+1.96
Independent	Richard Mezinec	309	1.07	+1.07
Unite Australia	Peter Sawyer	243	0.84	+0.84
Humanist	Scott Wilkie	172	0.59	+0.59
Centre Unity	John Beasley	93	0.32	+0.32
New Australian Republic	John Vartanian	74	0.26	+0.26
Total formal votes		28,940	95.689	
Informal votes		1,308	4.32	
Turnout		30,248	84.85	
Two-party-preferred result
Labor	Doug Shedden	14,832	61.37	−3.13
Liberal	Terry McDonald	9,336	38.63	+3.13
Labor hold		Swing	−3.13	

== See also ==
- Electoral results for the district of Bankstown
- List of New South Wales state by-elections
