= Candidates of the 1978 New South Wales state election =

This is a list of candidates of the 1978 New South Wales state election. The election was held on 7 October 1978.

== Retiring Members ==
Note: Tom Lewis MLA (Liberal, Wollondilly), George Neilly MLA (Labor, Cessnock) and Bruce Webster MLA (Liberal, Pittwater) all resigned some months prior to the election, but avoiding by-elections for their seats was one of the pretexts for the early election.

=== Labor ===
- William Coulter MLC
- Walter Geraghty MLC
- Edna Roper MLC
- Amelia Rygate MLC
- Leroy Serisier MLC
- Norman Thom MLC

=== Liberal ===
- Douglas Darby MLA (Manly)
- Keith Doyle MLA (Vaucluse)
- Ian Griffith MLA (Cronulla)
- Gordon Mackie MLA (Albury)
- Thomas Erskine MLC
- Stanley Eskell MLC
- Dick Evans MLC
- Ted Humphries MLC
- Thomas McKay MLC
- Anne Press MLC
- Bob Scott MLC
- Sir Edward Warren MLC

=== Country ===
- Sir Harry Budd MLC
- Otway Falkiner MLC
- Sir John Fuller MLC
- Sir Asher Joel MLC
- Geoffrey Keighley MLC
- Richmond Manyweathers MLC
- Ronald Raines MLC

== Legislative Assembly ==
Sitting members are shown in bold text. Successful candidates are highlighted in the relevant colour. Where there is possible confusion, an asterisk (*) is also used.

Electorate	Held by	Labor candidate	Coalition candidate	Other candidates
Albury	Liberal	Harold Mair	Clifford Chamberlain (CP); Phillip Williams (Lib)	
Armidale	Country	Bill McCarthy	**David Leitch** (CP)	Sidney Burkey (Dem)
Ashfield	Labor	**Paul Whelan**	Arthur McDonald (Lib)	
Auburn	Labor	**Peter Cox**	Maree Lloyd (Lib)	Aileen Beaver (CPA)
Balmain	Labor	**Roger Degen**	Ivor Balmain (Lib)	Brian Aarons (CPA); Lynda Boland (SWP)
Bankstown	Labor	**Nick Kearns**	John Ghent (Lib)	Vera Stewart (Dem)
Barwon	Country	Marshall Duncan	**Wal Murray** (CP)	
Bass Hill	Labor	**Neville Wran**	Phillip Wearne (Lib)	Gillian Benn (Dem)
Bathurst	Country	Mark Worthington	**Clive Osborne** (CP)	
Blacktown	Labor	**Gordon Barnier**	Alfred Spiteri (Lib)	Colin Mannix (Dem)
Bligh	Liberal	Suzanne Ashmore-Smith	**John Barraclough** (Lib)	Susanna Dodgson (Dem)
Blue Mountains	Labor	**Mick Clough**		Harold Coates (Ind); William Player (Dem)
Broken Hill	Labor	**Lew Johnstone**	John Betterman (CP); Peter Swan (Lib)	
Burrendong	Country	Reynold Toyer	**Roger Wotton** (CP)	
Burrinjuck	Labor	**Terry Sheahan**	Craddock Adams (CP)	
Burwood	Liberal	Phil O'Neill	**John Jackett** (Lib)	Stephen Kirkham (Dem)
Byron	Country	Thomas Hogan	**Jack Boyd** (CP)	Raymond Hunter (Mar); Marcia Ritchie (Dem)
Campbelltown	Labor	**Cliff Mallam**	William Sadler (Lib)	Mervyn Blinman (TAG); Judith Bradbury (Dem); John Hennessey (Ind Lab)
Canterbury	Labor	**Kevin Stewart**	Marjorie Pennington (Lib)	
Casino	Labor	**Don Day**	William Marshall (CP); Colin Sullivan (CP)	Peter Den Exter (Ind)
Castlereagh	Labor	**Jack Renshaw**	John Browne (Lib); John Hickmott (CP)	
Cessnock	Labor	Bob Brown	Terrence Nicholas (Lib)	
Charlestown	Labor	**Richard Face**	Richard Bevan (Lib)	
Clarence	Country	Danny Signor	**Matt Singleton** (CP)	John Kelly (Ind)
Coogee	Labor	**Michael Cleary**	David Kinsman (Lib)	Leslie Reiss (Dem)
Corrimal	Labor	**Laurie Kelly**	Peter Atkins (Lib)	Leslie Scott (Dem)
Cronulla	Liberal	Michael Egan	Dennis Porter (Lib)	
Davidson	Liberal	Christopher Lennon	**Dick Healey** (Lib)	
Drummoyne	Labor	**Michael Maher**	William Rowlings (Lib)	
Dubbo	Liberal	Roger Grealy	**John Mason** (Lib)	
Earlwood	Labor	**Ken Gabb**	Alan Jones (Lib)	Charles Bingle (Ind)
East Hills	Labor	**Pat Rogan**	Nefra Clarke (Lib)	Paul Terrett (Dem)
Eastwood	Liberal	Jan Murray	**Jim Clough** (Lib)	Phillip Cockell (Dem)
Fairfield	Labor	**Eric Bedford**	Charles Rogers (Lib)	Frank Havlan (Dem)
Fuller	Liberal	Rodney Cavalier	**Peter Coleman** (Lib)	Shirley Berg (Dem)
Georges River	Labor	**Frank Walker**	John Lyon (Lib)	Montague Greene (Dem)
Gloucester	Country	Ronald Aiken	**Leon Punch** (CP)	Bruce MacKenzie (Ind)
Gordon	Liberal	Arthur Litchfield	**Tim Moore** (Lib)	Ilse Robey (Dem)
Gosford	Labor	**Brian McGowan**	Andrew Fennell (Lib)	John Cleverly (Dem); Stanley Williams (Ind)
Goulburn	Country	Brian Lulham	**Ron Brewer** (CP)	Gregory Butler (Dem)
Granville	Labor	**Pat Flaherty**	Florence Maio (Lib)	Ronald Harrison (Dem); Paul Petit (SWP)
Hawkesbury	Liberal	Alwyn Lindfield	**Kevin Rozzoli** (Lib)	
Heathcote	Labor	**Rex Jackson**	Ron Phillips (Lib)	James Dredge (Dem)
Heffron	Labor	**Laurie Brereton**	George Balos (Lib)	
Hornsby	Liberal	Christopher Gorrick	**Neil Pickard** (Lib)	
Hurstville	Labor	**Kevin Ryan**	Ian Brown (Lib)	
Illawarra	Labor	**George Petersen**	Malcolm Yates (Lib)	William Speirs (Dem)
Kirribilli	Liberal	Glen Batchelor	**Bruce McDonald** (Lib)	
Kogarah	Labor	**Bill Crabtree**	Terrence Fraser (Lib)	
Ku-ring-gai	Liberal	Ian Cameron	**John Maddison** (Lib)	
Lake Macquarie	Labor	**Merv Hunter**	Oliver Fennell (Lib)	Lyn Godfrey (Dem)
Lakemba	Labor	**Vince Durick**	Robin Graham (Lib)	Brenda Adams (Dem)
Lane Cove	Liberal	Elizabeth Bishop	**John Dowd** (Lib)	John Newman (Dem)
Lismore	Country	William Slade	**Bruce Duncan** (CP)	Shirley Ryan (Dem)
Liverpool	Labor	**George Paciullo**	John Books (Lib)	Raymond Benn (Dem)
Maitland	Liberal	Noel Unicomb	**Milton Morris** (Lib)	
Manly	Liberal	Alan Stewart	George Ashley (Lib)	Anthony Dorney (Ind); John McGruer (Dem)
Maroubra	Labor	**Bill Haigh**	Kenneth Findlay (Lib)	Ronald Brewer (Dem)
Marrickville	Labor	**Tom Cahill**	Costa Lianos (Lib)	David Gibson (SPA)
Merrylands	Labor	**Jack Ferguson**	John Melouney (Lib)	Norma Wade (Dem)
Miranda	Liberal	Bill Robb	**Tim Walker** (Lib)	William Sibley (Dem)
Monaro	Labor	**John Akister**	John Ballesty (Lib); Thomas Barry (CP)	Graham Edwards (Ind)
Mosman	Liberal	Elizabeth Hood	**David Arblaster** (Lib)	
Mount Druitt	Labor	**Tony Johnson**	Thomas Rands (Lib)	Victoria Wootten (CPA)
Munmorah	Labor	**Harry Jensen**	Brian Taylor (Lib)	
Murray	Liberal	Robert Allen; Brian Oates	**Mary Meillon** (Lib)	Gregory Graham (Ind)
Murrumbidgee	Labor	**Lin Gordon**	Harold Bancroft (Lib); John Sullivan (CP)	Thomas Marriott (Ind)
Nepean	Liberal	Peter Anderson	**Ron Rofe** (Lib)	Ronald Edwards (Dem)
Newcastle	Labor	**Arthur Wade**	Elaine Samuels (Lib)	
Northcott	Liberal	Kristine Klugman	**Jim Cameron** (Lib)	Graham Blackman (Dem)
Orange	Country	Harold Gartrell	**Garry West** (CP)	
Oxley	Country	John Eastman	**Bruce Cowan** (CP)	
Parramatta	Labor	**Barry Wilde**	Roy McAuley (Lib)	Stephen Mason (Dem)
Peats	Labor	**Keith O'Connell**	Robert Hanington (Lib)	Ray Griffiths (Dem); Barry Phillips (Ind)
Penrith	Labor	**Ron Mulock**	Geoffrey Saunders (Lib)	
Phillip	Labor	**Pat Hills**	Philip Daley (Lib)	Gordon Adler (SWP); Judy Mundey (CPA)
Pittwater	Liberal	Charles Wild	Max Smith (Lib)	Kerry Warr (Dem); John Webeck (Ind)
Raleigh	Country	Joseph Moran	**Jim Brown** (CP)	
Rockdale	Labor	**Brian Bannon**	Joan Loew (Lib)	Edwin Bellchambers (Ind)
South Coast	Independent		Peter Ryan (Lib)	**John Hatton** (Ind)
Sturt	Country	Michael Anthony	**Tim Fischer** (CP)	
Tamworth	Country	William Forrest	**Noel Park** (CP)	Noel Cassel (Ind); Peter McLoughlin (Dem)
Temora	Country	Alroy Provan	**Jim Taylor** (CP)	
Tenterfield	Country	Jim Curran	**Tim Bruxner** (CP)	
The Hills	Liberal	Paul Gibson	**Fred Caterson** (Lib)	Robert Blackman (Dem)
Upper Hunter	Country	Ronald Brumpton	**Col Fisher** (CP)	
Vaucluse	Liberal	Barbara Fuller-Quinn	Rosemary Foot (Lib)	Norman Majer (Dem)
Wagga Wagga	Liberal	Thomas Watson	**Joe Schipp** (Lib)	Anthony Robinson (Ind)
Wakehurst	Liberal	Tom Webster	**Allan Viney** (Lib)	
Wallsend	Labor	**Ken Booth**	Denise Martin (Lib)	
Waratah	Labor	**Sam Jones**	Beryl Humble (Lib)	Christopher Dodds (CPA)
Waverley	Labor	**Syd Einfeld**	Margaret Davis (Lib)	Christopher Allen (Ind); Moshe Levy (Ind Lib); Michael Smythe (Dem)
Wentworthville	Labor	**Ernie Quinn**	Edward Roberts (Lib)	Peggy Cable (Dem)
Willoughby	Liberal	Eddie Britt	Nick Greiner (Lib)	**Laurie McGinty** (Ind Lib); Christine Townend (Dem)
Wollondilly	Liberal	Bill Knott	Peter Reynolds (Lib)	Paul Stocker (Dem); Robert Wilson (Ind)
Wollongong	Labor	**Eric Ramsay**	Ronald Brooks (Lib)	Andrew Jamieson (SWP); Ross Sampson (Dem)
Woronora	Labor	**Maurie Keane**	Brian Hickey (Lib)	Robert Davis (Dem)
Yaralla	Liberal	Garry McIlwaine	**Lerryn Mutton** (Lib)	Christopher Dunkerley (Dem)
Young	Country	Timothy West	**George Freudenstein** (CP)	

== Legislative Council ==
Sitting members are shown in bold text. Tickets that elected at least one MLC are highlighted in the relevant colour. Successful candidates are identified by an asterisk (*).

Labor candidates	Coalition candidates	Democrats candidates	Family Action candidates	Communist candidates	Marijuana candidates
1. **Joe Thompson***; 2. Dorothy Isaksen*; 3. Barrie Unsworth*; 4. Marie Fisher*; 5. **Clive Healey***; 6. Deirdre Grusovin*; 7. Jim Kaldis*; 8. Norm King*; 9. Peter Watkins*; 10. Ron Dyer	1. Virginia Chadwick* (Lib); 2. **Bob Rowland Smith*** (CP); 3. **Frank Calabro*** (Lib); 4. **Lloyd Lange*** (Lib); 5. **Toby MacDiarmid*** (CP); 6. **Peter Philips*** (Lib); 7. **Greg Percival*** (Lib); 8. Jack Doohan* (CP); 9. Diana Downie (Lib); 10. **Doug Moppett** (CP)	1. Paul McLean; 2. Ronald Mallett; 3. Malcolm Hilbery; 4. Charles Boag; 5. Laurence Bourke; 6. James Boow; 7. Joan Kersey; 8. Bruce Irwin; 9. George Laron; 10. Anita Stiller	1. Frieda Brown; 2. Malcolm Garvin	1. Jack Mundey; 2. Melva Merletto; 3. Darrell Dawson	1. Peter Livesey; 2. James Billington
Group C candidates	Ungrouped candidates				
1. Frank Oliveri; 2. Norman Young	Ross Green; Brian Brady; Frank Arkell; Judith Courtney; William Whitby; Allen Hands; Rudolph Dezelin				

== See also ==
- Members of the New South Wales Legislative Assembly, 1978–1981
- Members of the New South Wales Legislative Council, 1978–1981
