= 1980 Bankstown state by-election =

Election result for Bankstown, New South Wales, Australia

A by-election was held for the New South Wales Legislative Assembly electorate of Bankstown on 13 September 1980 following the death of Nick Kearns (Labor).

By-elections for the seats of Ku-ring-gai and Murray were held on the same day.

== Dates ==
Date	Event
24 July 1980	Death of Nick Kearns.
11 August 1980	Writ of election issued by the Speaker of the Legislative Assembly and close of electoral rolls.
18 August 1980	Day of nomination
13 September 1980	Polling day
26 September 1980	Return of writ

== Results ==
1980 Bankstown by-election Saturday 13 September
Party	Candidate	Votes	%	±%
Labor	Ric Mochalski	16,074	65.6	−7.4
Liberal	James McDonald	8,414	34.4	+13.7
Total formal votes		24,488	96.9	−0.4
Informal votes		779	3.1	+0.4
Turnout		25,267	77.5	−16.7
Labor hold		Swing	−10.2	

== See also ==
- Electoral results for the district of Bankstown
- List of New South Wales state by-elections
