= Wran ministry (1978–1980) =

72nd New South Wales government ministry, led by Neville Wran

Second Wran ministry
- 72nd Cabinet of the State of New South Wales

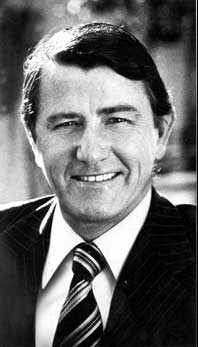
- Premier Neville Wran
- Date formed: 19 October 1978
- Date dissolved: 29 February 1980

People and organisations
- Monarch: Queen Elizabeth II
- Governor: Sir Roden Cutler
- Premier: Neville Wran
- Deputy Premier: Jack Ferguson
- No. of ministers: 19
- Member party: Labor
- Opposition parties: Liberal National coalition
- Opposition leader: John Mason

History
- Election: 1978 New South Wales election
- Predecessor: First Wran ministry
- Successor: Third Wran ministry

The Wran ministry (1978–1980) or Second Wran ministry was the 72nd ministry of the New South Wales Government, and was led by the 35th Premier of New South Wales, Neville Wran, representing the Labor Party. It was the second of eight consecutive occasions when Wran was Premier.

== Background ==
Wran had been elected to the Legislative Council of New South Wales by a joint sitting of the New South Wales Parliament on 12 March 1970. He was Leader of the Opposition in the Legislative Council from 22 February 1972. He resigned from the council on 19 October 1973 to switch to the Legislative Assembly, successfully contesting the election for Bass Hill, which he would hold until his retirement in 1986. Wran successfully challenged Pat Hills to become Leader of Labor Party and Leader of the Opposition from 3 December 1973 and became Premier following a narrow one seat victory at the 1976 election.

Labor had returned to government in 1976 after 11 years in opposition, following a narrow one seat victory at the 1976 election. 85% of voters approved a referendum in June 1978 to introduce direct elections for the Legislative Council. The election on 7 October 1978 was a landslide victory for Labor, popularly known as the "Wranslide", with a swing to Labor of 9.1%, gaining 13 seats. The first election for the Legislative Council in 127 years saw Labor win nine of the 15 available seats, giving it a majority of four seats in the council.

== Composition of ministry ==
The composition of the ministry was announced by Premier Wran and sworn in on 19 October 1978. Former Premier and minister, Jack Renshaw, announced his decision to retire from politics in January 1980, with Wran assuming his portfolio of Treasurer pending a reconfiguration of the ministry on 29 February 1980 and the Third Wran ministry was formed.

=== First arrangement ===
Portfolio	Minister	Party	Term commence	Term end	Term of office
Premier	Neville Wran	Labor	19 October 1978	29 February 1980	1 year, 133 days
Deputy Premier; Minister for Public Works; Minister for Ports	Jack Ferguson (Note: Retained portfolios from the first Wran ministry.)	Labor	19 October 1978	29 February 1980	1 year, 133 days
Treasurer	Jack Renshaw (Note: Jack Renshaw resigned from the ministry and from Parliament on 29 January 1980, with Neville Wran taking on the Treasury portfolio.)	Labor	19 October 1978	29 January 1980	1 year, 102 days
Treasurer	Neville Wran	Labor	29 January 1980	29 February 1980	31 days
Minister for Transport	Peter Cox	Labor	19 October 1978	29 February 1980	1 year, 133 days
Attorney General; Minister for Justice	Frank Walker	Labor	19 October 1978	29 February 1980	1 year, 133 days
Minister for Industrial Relations; Minister for Technology; Minister for Energy	Pat Hills	Labor	19 October 1978	29 February 1980	1 year, 133 days
Minister for Planning and Environment; Vice-President of the Executive Council; Leader of the Government in Legislative Council	Paul Landa, MLC	Labor	19 October 1978	29 February 1980	1 year, 133 days
Minister for Agriculture	Don Day	Labor	19 October 1978	29 February 1980	1 year, 133 days
Minister for Education	Eric Bedford	Labor	19 October 1978	29 February 1980	1 year, 133 days
Minister for Local Government; Minister for Roads	Harry Jensen	Labor	19 October 1978	29 February 1980	1 year, 133 days
Minister for Lands; Minister for Services	Bill Crabtree	Labor	19 October 1978	29 February 1980	1 year, 133 days
Minister for Health	Kevin Stewart	Labor	19 October 1978	29 February 1980	1 year, 133 days
Minister for Consumer Affairs; Minister for Housing; Minister for Co-operative Societies	Syd Einfeld	Labor	19 October 1978	29 February 1980	1 year, 133 days
Minister for Mineral Resources and Development	Ron Mulock	Labor	19 October 1978	29 February 1980	1 year, 133 days
Minister for Sport and Recreation; Minister for Tourism	Ken Booth	Labor	19 October 1978	29 February 1980	1 year, 133 days
Minister for Conservation; Minister for Water Resources	Lin Gordon	Labor	19 October 1978	29 February 1980	1 year, 133 days
Minister for Youth and Community Services	Rex Jackson	Labor	19 October 1978	29 February 1980	1 year, 133 days
Minister Assisting the Premier	Bill Haigh	Labor	19 October 1978	29 February 1980	1 year, 133 days
Minister for Decentralisation; Minister Assisting the Premier	Jack Hallam, MLC	Labor	19 October 1978	29 February 1980	1 year, 133 days

Ministers are members of the Legislative Assembly unless otherwise noted.

=== See also ===
- Members of the New South Wales Legislative Assembly, 1978–1981
- Members of the New South Wales Legislative Council, 1978–1981

== Notes ==
Preceded by First Wran ministry (1976–1978)	Second Wran ministry 1978–1980	Succeeded by Third Wran ministry (1980–1981)
