= 1980 Murray state by-election =

Election result for Murray, New South Wales, Australia

A by-election was held for the New South Wales Legislative Assembly seat of Murray on 13 September 1980. It was triggered by the death of Mary Meillon (Liberal). The seat had not been contested by the Country party since 1973 as the Coalition agreement prohibited the party from endorsing candidates to run against sitting Liberals. The 1980 redistribution would see the district of Sturt abolished, and much of the district included in the Murray. Tim Fischer (Country) was the member for Sturt and resigned to contest the by-election.

By-elections for the seats of Bankstown and Ku-ring-gai were held on the same day.

== Dates ==
| Date | Event |
|---|---|
| 8 June 1980 | Mary Meillon died. |
| 11 August 1980 | Writ of election issued by the Speaker of the Legislative Assembly and close of electoral rolls. |
| 18 August 1980 | Date of nomination |
| 13 September 1980 | Polling day |
| 26 September 1980 | Return of writ |

== Result ==
1980 Murray by-election]] Saturday 13 September
| Party | Candidate | Votes | % | ±% |
|---|---|---|---|---|
| Country | Tim Fischer | 8,496 | 45.4 | |
| Labor | Robert Allen | 5,804 | 31.0 | +6.3 |
| Liberal | Bill Hazelton | 4,435 | 23.7 | −19.7 |
| Total formal votes | | 18,735 | 98.5 | |
| Informal votes | | 289 | 1.5 | |
| Turnout | | 19,024 | 83.3 | |
Two-party-preferred result
| Country | Tim Fischer | 12,396 | 67.0 | |
| Labor | Robert Allen | 6,119 | 33.1 | −6.8 |
| Country gain from Liberal | | Swing | | |

== See also ==
- Electoral results for the district of Murray
- List of New South Wales state by-elections
