= Centre Unity Party =

- Founder: Patricia Poulos
- Founded: October 1986
- Dissolved: 1990
- Ideology: Centrism

The Centre Unity Party (CUP) was an Australian political party.

== History ==
The party was formed by Patricia Poulos in October 1986, and first contested two New South Wales state by-elections − Bankstown and Heathcote − in January 1987.

At the 1990 federal election, the party contested ran five Senate tickets across multiple states, although it was not registered with the Australian Electoral Commission. Poulos also contested the division of Cook, where she received 2.1% of the vote, coming last in a field of five candidates.

The party did not contest any further elections. Its logo was back-to-back kangaroos.
