= 1980 Ku-ring-gai state by-election =

Election result for Ku-ring-gai, New South Wales, Australia

A by-election was held for the New South Wales Legislative Assembly seat of Ku-ring-gai on 13 September 1980. It was triggered by the resignation of John Maddison (Liberal).

By-elections for the seats of Bankstown and Murray were held on the same day.

== Dates ==
Date	Event
4 July 1980	John Maddison resigned.
11 August 1980	Writ of election issued by the Speaker of the Legislative Assembly and close of electoral rolls.
18 August 1980	Day of nomination
13 September 1980	Polling day
26 September 1980	Return of writ

== Results ==
1980 Ku-ring-gai by-election Saturday 13 September
Party	Candidate	Votes	%	±%
Liberal	Nick Greiner	15,681	68.7	+3.2
Independent	Brian Buckley	7,152	31.3	
Total formal votes		22,833	96.1	−1.9
Informal votes		917	3.9	+1.9
Turnout		23,750	71.1	−19.9
Liberal hold		Swing	+3.2 (Note: compared to the two-party-preferred result for the 1978 Ku-ring-gai election.)	

Labor did not nominate a candidate.

== See also ==
- Electoral results for the district of Ku-ring-gai
- List of New South Wales state by-elections
