= Jan Murray (public relations consultant) =

Australian public relations consultant

- Born: Janice Beatrice Murray; 1943 (age 82–83); Australia
- Education: Macquarie University
- Occupations: Public elations consultant; writer; media personality; TV personality

Janice Beatrice Murray (born 1943) is an Australian public relations consultant, writer and media personality.

== Career ==
=== Politics ===
Murray contested the seat of Eastwood at the 1978 New South Wales state election for the New South Wales branch of the Australian Labor Party. Although gaining a swing of over 7% in her favour and contributing to a swing away from the Liberal Party of over 13%, Murray was unsuccessful, beaten by incumbent Member for Eastwood, and former Treasurer Jim Clough, who secured 51.44% of the vote compared to Murray's 42.52%.

=== Public relations ===
From 1981, Murray was principal of Jan Murray & Associates Pty Ltd––a public relations firm that handled a variety of high-profile campaigns, including the spectacular Gala Opening of the Gold Coast International Hotel, and the Australian Tourism Commission's Shrimp on the barbie advertisements featuring Australian actor Paul Hogan, which was overseen by her former husband, then-Minister for Tourism, John Brown.

In 1987–88 Murray's firm worked gratis to rescue what would become the highlight of the Australian Bicentenary celebrations, the First Fleet Re-enactment Voyage. The venture was in dire straights with the Commonwealth initially refusing to contribute. JMA raised millions of dollars by organising an emergency radiothon on 2UE and sourcing corporate sponsorship for the venture. The consultancy finished the exhaustive but highly successful eight-month campaign having personally lost $60,000.

The consultancy was also involved in other aspects of public relations and lobbied the Bjelke-Petersen government to contribute $10 million to the Sanctuary Cove development. The developer, Mike Gore, invited Murray to accompany him in his helicopter the day it flew over the vast property at the moment the dam was opened to allow the water to flood in to the completed and spectacular resort.

During the historic bushfires which ringed Sydney in the summer holiday period of 1994, Murray and her son Christopher Brown––with the new Lord Mayor of Sydney, Frank Sartor, on holidays with his family on the south coast of NSW––took up residence in his (empty) Lord Mayoral chambers and after legally establishing the Lord Mayor's Bushfire Appeal and the Commonwealth Bank as the receiving bank, set about hitting up Australia's 'Top end of Town', raising $11.3 million from the corporate sector (again gratis). In the following weeks, Murray was appointed to the Lord Mayor's Bushfire Appeal Trust which had the responsibility to disseminate the funds––mainly to purchase upgraded firefighting equipment––and made certain at least $250,000 went towards wildlife rescue.

The following year, with the Festival of Sydney in trouble and the main corporate sponsor of the Christmas Carols in the Park pulling out––and hence Channel Nine considering not broadcasting––the consultancy helped put the show back on the road by raising funds and bringing the TV network back onboard. Again, the consultancy gave its services gratis.

=== Television ===
On television, during the 1970s and 80s Murray was a regular guest on The Mike Walsh Show and was the controversial left-wing panellist on Ch10/Foxtel's daytime discussion program Beauty and the Beast from 1996 to 2005, where she became known for her frequent volatile arguments with the show's host, Stan Zemanek.

=== Writing ===
Murray, with her background in Tourism, developed the concept for what became Channel Nine's Getaway show in 1992. In 2010 she published her memoir Sheer Madness: Sex, Lies and Politics . In 2012, Murray published a novel called Goodbye Lullaby. Murray went on to publish a revised edition of Goodbye Lullaby (2022) along with a new novel Bright Echoes and a middle school book, NO BRIDGE, NO WAY!: A Glencairn Island Mystery. In 2019, Murray published her second memoir, Pilgrim Souls: A Memoir.

== Personal life ==
From age six, Murray suffered from severe hearing loss and subsequently learned to lip read. In 1963, Murray married John Brown, who became Member for Parramatta at the 1977 Australian federal election and became a Federal Government Minister in 1983 in the First Hawke Ministry before he entered Cabinet in 1987.

Murray graduated from Macquarie University in 1981 with a Bachelor of Arts (Honours), majoring in political science, English and media.

=== Sex on the desk scandal ===
Following initial reports in The Sun, Murray admitted during a 60 Minutes interview in 1987 to having sexual intercourse with her husband on his desk in his office at Parliament House in Canberra in 1983, and leaving her underwear in an ashtray. A spokesperson for then Australian Prime Minister Bob Hawke said while Murray's comments were in "poor taste" they had nothing to do with Brown's ministerial duties.

When Channel Nine approached Murray for their 60 Minutes story, as an avowed feminist, she accepted on the condition she be given means to make the point that the role of the "dutiful minister's wife" was not for her. She said that there would be no flowered hats and long white gloves, it was a new dawn. She said that many women, even while raising families, also had careers outside the home and the government should not expect political spouses to fall into line as in days gone by. She had previously locked horns with Prime Minister Hawke when he attempted to legislate for parliamentary wives to declare their pecuniary interests - at the same time he was spruiking his Equal Opportunity legislation and his determination to afford women independence. The ultimate 'Murray' amendment, written about in the Financial Times, is recorded in Hansard.

The so-called 'Sex on the Desk' 60 Minute scandal went to air in March 1987 and rocked the nation, being the most popular segment ever to be shown by Channel Nine (beating the popular 'Alf' segment). Nine filmed Murray for three days as she went about organizing the Gala Lunch for Bjelke-Petersen during the opening of the Gold Coast International Hotel and she was also interviewed by Mike Munro at her home and at the Lobby Restaurant in Canberra. However, the network heavily edited out all of Murray's feminist discussion, in which she had emphasised she had travelled to Canberra that night to seek her conjugal rights, not as the media would portray it, "celebrating Brown's rise to the ministry". Only one journalist, Kristin Williamson, reported this accurately, with many others seeking to sensationalise the declaration of a wife having married sex with her husband and father of their five children. Her case was that the federal parliamentary system was contradictory to the conservative rhetoric eulogising family life. Rather, it took a parent/spouse away for days, often for weeks, from their family.

Murray's on-screen 'desk' revelation continues to be referred to occasionally in the Australian media.
