= Spence Powell =

Australian politician

Personal details
- Born: 8 August 1903 Pyrmont, New South Wales
- Died: 9 July 1970 (aged 66) Bankstown, New South Wales
- Party: Labor Party

Arthur Thomas (Spence) Powell (8 August 1903 – 9 July 1970) was an Australian politician and a member of the New South Wales Legislative Assembly from 1950 until 1962. He was a member of the Labor Party (ALP).

Powell was born in Pyrmont, New South Wales, and was the son of a bridge builder. He was educated at Marist Brothers High School Darlinghurst and worked as a fitter for a number of employees including the New South Wales Government Railways. He was an official with the Amalgamated Engineering Union and became involved with community organisations including the Greyhound Racing Association and the board of Bankstown Hospital. Powell was elected as a councillor at Wyong Shire in 1962–5. He was elected to the New South Wales Parliament as the Labor member for the seat of Bankstown at the 1950 state election after the sitting Labor member and Premier James McGirr decided to stand for the new seat of Liverpool. He retained the seat for the Labor Party at the next three elections and retired at the 1962 election. He did not hold party, parliamentary or ministerial office.

New South Wales Legislative Assembly
Preceded by James McGirr	Member for Bankstown; 1950 – 1962	Succeeded by Nick Kearns
