= Doug Shedden (politician) =

Australian politician (1937–2020)

Douglas James Shedden (17 December 1937 − 13 January 2020) was an Australian politician. He was the Labor member for Bankstown in the New South Wales Legislative Assembly from 1987 to 1999.

Shedden was born in Casino, and worked as an electronics firm manager before entering politics. On 7 October 1961 he married Patricia Lewis, with whom he had a daughter. He sat on Bankstown City Council from 1977 to 1987, and was deputy mayor 1980–83. A prominent member of the local Labor Party, he was president of the Greenacre branch for twenty years.

In 1987, the member for the local state seat of Bankstown, Ric Mochalski, resigned after being charged with involvement in the collapse of a property trust. Shedden was selected as the Labor candidate for the by-election, and was elected fairly easily, although independent candidate Kevin Ryan achieved 18.6% of the vote. He was not significantly challenged in subsequent elections, and sat as a Labor backbencher until his retirement in 1999. His retirement allowed Tony Stewart to move to the seat from Lakemba, making way for Hurstville MP Morris Iemma, whose seat had been abolished.

New South Wales Legislative Assembly
Preceded by Ric Mochalski	Member for Bankstown; 1987−1999	Succeeded by Tony Stewart
