= 1978 New South Wales state election =

- 7 October 1978

All 99 seats in the New South Wales Legislative Assembly and 15 (of 44) seats in the New South Wales Legislative Council 50 Assembly seats needed for a majority
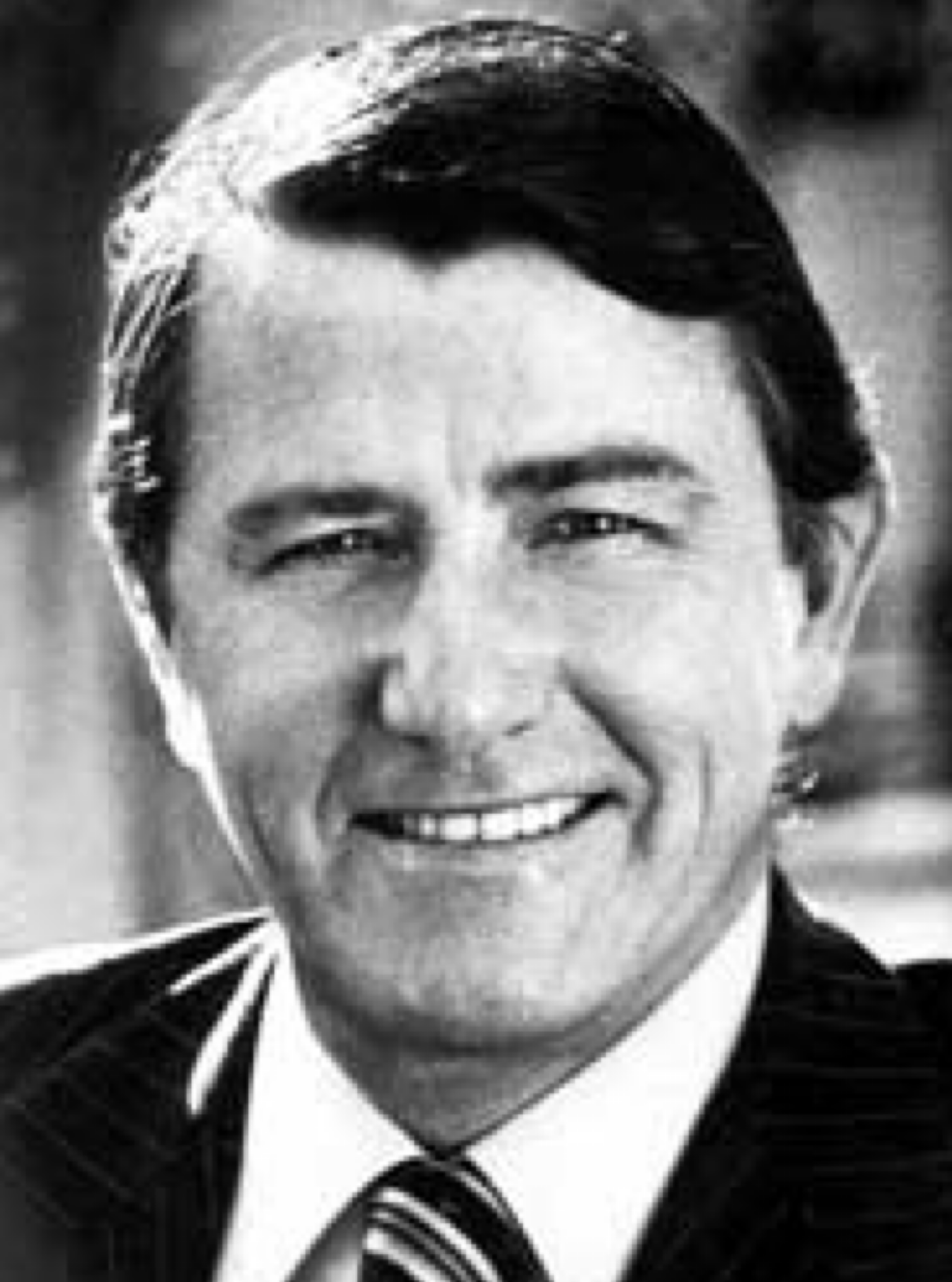

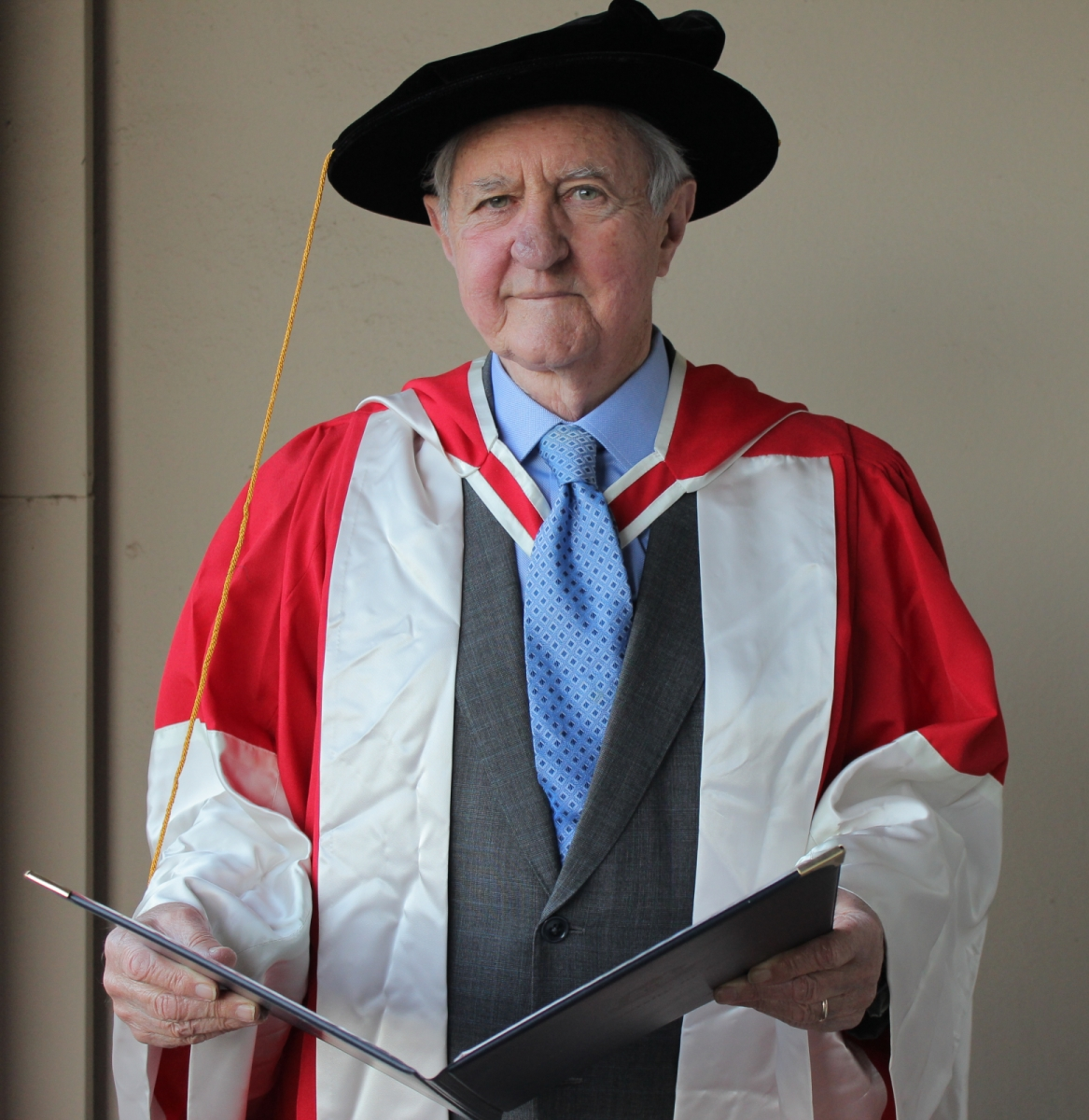
	First party	Second party
Leader	Neville Wran	Peter Coleman
Party	Labor	Liberal/National coalition
Leader since	3 December 1973	16 December 1977
Leader's seat	Bass Hill	Fuller (lost seat)
Last election	50 seats	48 seats
Seats won	63	35
Seat change	▲13	▼13
Popular vote	1,615,949	1,031,780
Percentage	57.77%	36.88%
Swing	▲8.02	▼9.18
TPP	60.70%	39.30%
TPP swing	▲9.10	▼9.10
- Two-candidate-preferred margin by electorate
Premier before election
Neville Wran
Labor
Elected Premier
Neville Wran
Labor

The 1978 New South Wales state election was held on 7 October 1978 to elect all 99 members of the New South Wales Legislative Assembly. The Labor Party Government was returned for a second term, defeating the Opposition Liberal/National coalition in a landslide victory under leader Neville Wran. The election is popularly known as the "Wranslide".

It is notable for being so successful for the Labor Party that it tallied 57 percent of the primary vote, the largest primary vote for any party in over a century. Having gone into the election with a razor-thin majority of one seat, Labor scored a 13-seat swing, giving it a strong majority of 63 seats. Labor even managed to defeat the Leader of the Opposition, Peter Coleman, in his own electorate. The seats of many other prominent Shadow Ministers fell to Labor as well. Labor also won many seats in areas long reckoned as Coalition heartland. Among them were four seats that Labor had never won before this election--Willoughby (contested for the Liberal Party by Nick Greiner who later became Premier), Manly, Wakehurst and Cronulla. It also came within striking distance of taking several more. For instance, it pared down the margin in Pittwater, the seat of former premier Bob Askin, to only 1.4 percent.

The state's first elections to the New South Wales Legislative Council, the state parliament's upper house, were held simultaneously. Voters had approved a referendum to introduce a directly elected council in June of that year. Starting with this election, Single transferable voting (STV) was used to fill the Council seats up for election. The election of 15 members in a single contest was the largest District Magnitude seen in a STV election since the 1925 Ireland Senate election. It would be surpassed, again by NSW in 1995 when it began to elect 21 in a single contest.

The election was also the first in the state to be contested by the Australian Democrats.

Labor continued to campaign heavily on the strengths of Wran himself, with the slogan "Wran's our man".

== Key dates ==
Date	Event
12 September 1978	The Legislative Assembly was dissolved, and writs were issued by the Governor to proceed with an election.
18 September 1978	Nominations for candidates for the election closed at noon.
7 October 1978	Polling day, between the hours of 8am and 6pm.
19 October 1978	The second Wran ministry was constituted.
3 November 1978	The writ was returned and the results formally declared.
7 November 1978	Parliament resumed for business.

== Results ==
=== Legislative Assembly ===
New South Wales state election, 7 October 1978 Legislative Assembly << 1976–1981 >>
Enrolled voters	3,085,661				
Votes cast	2,862,616		Turnout	92.77	–0.52
Informal votes	65,274		Informal	2.28	+0.52
Summary of votes by party
Party	Primary votes	%	Swing	Seats	Change
Labor	1,615,949	57.77	+8.02	63	+13
Liberal	754,796	26.98	–9.31	18	–12
National Country	276,984	9.90	–0.13	17	– 1
Democrats	74,019	2.65	+2.65	0	± 0
Communist	8,472	0.30	+0.22	0	± 0
Socialist Workers	4,467	0.16	+0.07	0	± 0
Independent	62,655	2.24	–0.58	1	± 0
Total	2,797,342			99	

Popular vote
Labor	57.77%
Liberal	26.98%
National Country	9.90%
Democrats	2.65%
Independents	2.24%
Others	0.46%
Parliamentary seats
Labor	63
Liberal	18
National Country	17
Independents	1

=== Legislative Council ===
This election was held using STV for at-large election of members of Legislative Council.

New South Wales state election, 7 October 1978 Legislative Council
Enrolled voters	3,085,661				
Votes cast	2,862,616		Turnout	92.77	
Informal votes	115,995		Informal	4.05	
Summary of votes by party
Party	Primary votes	%	Swing	Seats won	Seats held
Labor	1,508,078	54.91		9	23
Liberal/National Coalition	996,463	36.28		6	20
Communist	79,794	2.91		0	
Democrats	76,369	2.78		0	
Family Action Movement	36,076	1.31		0	
Marijuana	25,055	0.91		0	
Independent	24,786	0.90		0	
Total	2,746,621			15	

The final 2 party preferred result was 60.7% for Labor and 39.3% for the Coalition, making it one of the biggest landslide victories in New South Wales's electoral history. In 2PP terms it was a 9.1% swing to Labor from the Coalition. This was beaten by the Coalition's result of 64.2% and 35.8% for Labor in the 2011 election. However, Labor's record primary vote of 57.7 percent still stands today.

== Seats changing hands ==
Seat	1976 election			Swing	1978 election		
Seat	Party	Member	Margin	Swing	Margin	Member	Party
Albury	Liberal	Gordon Mackie	8.1	8.8	0.7	Harold Mair	Labor
Armidale	National Country	David Leitch	6.6	7.2	0.6	Bill McCarthy	Labor
Burwood	Liberal	John Jackett	8.4	10.0	1.6	Phil O'Neill	Labor
Cronulla	Liberal	Ian Griffith	3.8	12.4	8.6	Michael Egan	Labor
Earlwood (Note: Earlwood Liberal MLA Eric Willis resigned on 16 June 1978. Labor candidate Ken Gabb won the resulting by-election on 15 July.)	Liberal		5.5	16.1	10.6	Ken Gabb	Labor
Fuller	Liberal	Peter Coleman	3.4	8.7	5.3	Rodney Cavalier	Labor
Manly	Liberal	Douglas Darby	7.7	11.5	3.8	Alan Stewart	Labor
Miranda	Liberal	Tim Walker	4.0	10.5	6.5	Bill Robb	Labor
Nepean	Liberal	Ron Rofe	2.3	10.8	8.5	Peter Anderson	Labor
Wakehurst	Liberal	Allan Viney	7.8	14.0	6.2	Tom Webster	Labor
Willoughby	Liberal	Laurie McGinty (Note: The sitting member for Willoughby, Laurie McGinty, lost preselection as the Liberal candidate and contested the election as an Independent. Margin is Liberal vs. Labor at the 1976 election.)	13.1	13.9	0.8	Eddie Britt	Labor
Wollondilly	Liberal	Tom Lewis	7.6	8.0	0.4	Bill Knott	Labor
Yaralla	Liberal	Lerryn Mutton	4.4	12.6	8.2	Garry McIlwaine	Labor

- Members listed in italics did not recontest their seats.

== Post-election pendulum ==
Labor seats (63)
Marginal
Wollondilly	Bill Knott	ALP	0.4%
Armidale	Bill McCarthy	ALP	0.6%
Albury	Harold Mair	ALP	0.7%
Willoughby	Eddie Britt	ALP	0.8%
Burwood	Phil O'Neill	ALP	1.6%
Manly	Alan Stewart	ALP	3.8%
Fuller	Rodney Cavalier	ALP	5.3%
Fairly safe
Wakehurst	Tom Webster	ALP	6.2%
Miranda	Bill Robb	ALP	6.5%
Castlereagh	Jack Renshaw	ALP	6.9%
Yaralla	Garry McIlwaine	ALP	8.2%
Nepean	Peter Anderson	ALP	8.5%
Cronulla	Michael Egan	ALP	8.6%
Monaro	John Akister	ALP	9.3%
Gosford	Brian McGowan	ALP	9.6%
Murrumbidgee	Lin Gordon	ALP	9.6%
Casino	Don Day	ALP	9.7%
Safe
Earlwood	Ken Gabb	ALP	11.6%
Hurstville	Kevin Ryan	ALP	13.7%
Blue Mountains	Mick Clough	ALP	14.5% v IND
Coogee	Michael Cleary	ALP	16.4%
Burrinjuck	Terry Sheahan	ALP	16.9%
Georges River	Frank Walker	ALP	17.0%
Charlestown	Richard Face	ALP	17.4%
Kogarah	Bill Crabtree	ALP	17.9%
Ashfield	Paul Whelan	ALP	18.1%
Waverley	Syd Einfeld	ALP	18.8%
Drummoyne	Michael Maher	ALP	18.9%
Parramatta	Barry Wilde	ALP	19.0%
Peats	Keith O'Connell	ALP	20.8%
Woronora	Maurie Keane	ALP	20.8%
Campbelltown	Cliff Mallam	ALP	21.5%
Newcastle	Arthur Wade	ALP	22.3%
Corrimal	Laurie Kelly	ALP	22.5%
Maroubra	Bill Haigh	ALP	22.5%
Lake Macquarie	Merv Hunter	ALP	23.5%
Wollongong	Eric Ramsay	ALP	23.8%
Wentworthville	Ernie Quinn	ALP	24.2%
Heathcote	Rex Jackson	ALP	25.2%
East Hills	Pat Rogan	ALP	25.6%
Waratah	Sam Jones	ALP	25.6%
Bankstown	Nick Kearns	ALP	25.8%
Canterbury	Kevin Stewart	ALP	26.0%
Penrith	Ron Mulock	ALP	26.2%
Lakemba	Vince Durick	ALP	27.0%
Broken Hill	Lew Johnstone	ALP	27.1%
Blacktown	Gordon Barnier	ALP	27.2%
Munmorah	Harry Jensen	ALP	27.3%
Illawarra	George Petersen	ALP	28.2%
Auburn	Peter Cox	ALP	28.4%
Fairfield	Eric Bedford	ALP	28.4%
Granville	Pat Flaherty	ALP	28.6%
Merrylands	Jack Ferguson	ALP	28.6%
Cessnock	Bob Brown	ALP	29.1%
Wallsend	Ken Booth	ALP	29.3%
Bass Hill	Neville Wran	ALP	29.7%
Phillip	Pat Hills	ALP	29.7%
Rockdale	Brian Bannon	ALP	29.7%
Marrickville	Tom Cahill	ALP	29.8%
Heffron	Laurie Brereton	ALP	30.0%
Liverpool	George Paciullo	ALP	30.8%
Mount Druitt	Tony Johnson	ALP	31.1%
Balmain	Roger Degen	ALP	34.2%

Liberal/Country seats (35)
Marginal
Hornsby	Neil Pickard	LIB	0.8%
Goulburn	Ron Brewer	CP	0.9%
Pittwater	Max Smith	LIB	1.4%
Orange	Garry West	CP	1.7%
Bathurst	Clive Osborne	CP	2.7%
Young	George Freudenstein	CP	3.0%
Tamworth	Noel Park	CP	3.3%
Dubbo	John Mason	LIB	3.4%
Byron	Jack Boyd	CP	3.6%
Kirribilli	Bruce McDonald	LIB	3.8%
Wagga Wagga	Joe Schipp	LIB	3.8%
Maitland	Milton Morris	LIB	4.3%
Upper Hunter	Col Fisher	CP	4.4%
Eastwood	Jim Clough	LIB	4.5%
Vaucluse	Rosemary Foot	LIB	4.5%
The Hills	Fred Caterson	LIB	4.6%
Hawkesbury	Kevin Rozzoli	LIB	5.2%
Raleigh	Jim Brown	CP	5.3%
Fairly safe
Davidson	Dick Healey	LIB	7.4%
Northcott	Jim Cameron	LIB	7.4%
Lane Cove	John Dowd	LIB	7.5%
Barwon	Wal Murray	CP	8.3%
Burrendong	Roger Wotton	CP	8.3%
Bligh	John Barraclough	LIB	8.4%
Gloucester	Leon Punch	CP	9.2%
Tenterfield	Tim Bruxner	CP	9.4%
Safe
Murray	Mary Meillon	LIB	10.1%
Clarence	Matt Singleton	CP	10.9%
Mosman	David Arblaster	LIB	11.8%
Oxley	Bruce Cowan	CP	12.5%
Lismore	Bruce Duncan	CP	13.8%
Ku-ring-gai	John Maddison	LIB	15.5%
Sturt	Tim Fischer	CP	16.0%
Temora	Jim Taylor	CP	17.6%
Gordon	Tim Moore	LIB	24.0%
Crossbench seats (1)
South Coast	John Hatton	IND	20.5 v LIB

== See also ==
- Candidates of the 1978 New South Wales state election
