= Ric Mochalski =

Australian politician

Richard Charles "Ric" Mochalski (21 March 1948 – 27 September 2002) was an Australian politician. He was the Labor member for Bankstown in the New South Wales Legislative Assembly from 1980 to 1986.

Mochalski was the son of Czeslaw and Lola Mochalski, and was educated at De La Salle College. He received a Bachelor of Law from the University of Sydney before becoming a solicitor ion 26 July 1974. He also worked as a project manager with a public company. In November 1986, he married Deanne Crosio, with whom he had two children.

Following the death in 1980 of Nick Kearns, the Labor member for the state seat of Bankstown, Mochalski was selected as the Labor candidate for the by-election and was easily elected. He held the seat comfortably in 1981 and 1984.

In 1984 the Balanced Property Trust collapsed with losses of $50 million. Mochalski was a founder of the trust, one of its directors and acted as solicitor for the trust. By 1986 Mochalski was under pressure to resign as a result of the collapse. Mochalski resigned on 1 December 1986, giving the reason as ill health. He applied to the NSW Parliamentary Superanuation Fund for a medical pension, but that was rejected following a report from the NSW Chief Medical Officer. The Legal Services Tribunal found that Mochalski was involved in making false and misleading statements about the Balanced Property Trust, that he had breached his duty to disclose his interest in relation to the Balanced Property Trust and the transactions and he was struck off the roll of solicitors.

He was the subject of an investigation by the Independent Commission Against Corruption regarding unrelated allegations by John Henry Neal that he had been part of a criminal conspiracy to delay the supply of water to Neal's land and had solicited a bribe of $250,000. The ICAC found that Mochalski was not involved in any criminal conduct but that he had a conflict of interest and sought to use his position as a parliamentarian to obtain a personal benefit.

Mochalski was initially facing multiple charges of fraud and conspiracy to defraud, however in April 1991 he was committed to stand trial on a single charge, a common law conspiracy to cheat and defraud. The outcome of this charge is unclear, with his parliamentary biography stating that he was convicted, as do Clune and Griffith, while Antony Green states that he was acquitted.

Mochalski died at Terrigal on 27 September 2002 (aged 54).

New South Wales Legislative Assembly
Preceded by Nick Kearns	Member for Bankstown; 1980–1986	Succeeded by Doug Shedden
