= Electoral district of Bankstown =

State electoral district of New South Wales, Australia

Bankstown New South Wales—Legislative Assembly
- Interactive map of district boundaries from the 2023 state election
- State: New South Wales
- Created: 1927
- MP: Jihad Dib
- Party: Labor
- Namesake: Bankstown, New South Wales
- Electors: 54,108 (2019)
- Area: 23 km^{2} (8.9 sq mi)
- Demographic: Inner metropolitan
Electorates around Bankstown:
Auburn	Auburn	Strathfield
East Hills	Bankstown	Canterbury
East Hills	Oatley	Kogarah

Bankstown is an electoral district of the Legislative Assembly in the Australian state of New South Wales in Sydney's West. It has historically been one of the safest Labor seats in New South Wales. It is currently represented by Jihad Dib, a member of the Labor party, who was previously the member for the abolished seat Lakemba.

== Geography ==
On its current boundaries, Bankstown takes in the suburbs of Chullora, Greenacre, Mount Lewis, Punchbowl, and part of Bankstown, Beleverly Hills, Condell Park, Lakemba, Narwee, Revesby, Riverwood, Roselands, Wiley Park, Yagoona.

== Members for Bankstown ==
Member	Party	Period
James McGirr	Labor	1927–1940
James McGirr	Labor (N-C)	1940–1941
James McGirr	Labor	1941–1950
Spence Powell	Labor	1950–1962
Nick Kearns	Labor	1962–1980
Ric Mochalski	Labor	1980–1986
Doug Shedden	Labor	1987–1999
Tony Stewart	Labor	1999–2011
Tania Mihailuk	Labor	2011–2022
Tania Mihailuk	Independent	2022–2023
Tania Mihailuk	One Nation	2023
Jihad Dib	Labor	2023–present

== Election results ==
2023 New South Wales state election: Bankstown
Party	Candidate	Votes	%	±%
Labor	Jihad Dib	27,247	59.4	−0.8
Liberal	Nathan Taleb	11,379	24.8	+0.8
Greens	Isaac Nasedra	2,436	5.3	+0.8
Informed Medical Options	Yosra Alyateem	1,306	2.8	+2.8
Independent	Max Boddy	1,223	2.7	+2.7
Animal Justice	Dorlene Abou-Haidar	893	1.9	+0.7
Sustainable Australia	Luke Habib	725	1.6	+1.6
Public Education	Marianne Glinka	679	1.5	+1.5
Total formal votes		45,888	93.4	−0.4
Informal votes		3,267	6.6	+0.4
Turnout		49,155	82.9	−2.5
Two-party-preferred result
Labor	Jihad Dib	29,210	70.3	−0.1
Liberal	Nathan Taleb	12,322	29.7	+0.1
Labor hold		Swing	−0.1	
