= Nick Kearns =

Australian politician

Nicholas Joseph Kearns (16 January 1920 – 24 July 1980) was an Australian politician. He was a Labor Party member of the New South Wales Legislative Assembly from 1962 to 1980, representing the electorate of Bankstown.

Kearns was born in Glebe, and was educated at Belmore Technical School. He joined the Railways Department as an apprentice fitter at Eveleigh Workshops in 1936, working as a fitter and turner both there and later at Chullora Workshops. He rose to become sub-foreman at Chullora from 1961 to 1962; he was also the Amalgamated Engineering Union shop steward for the workshops. Kearns also had a long involvement with the Labor Party prior to entering politics. He had joined the party at 21, and had variously held the positions of branch president and secretary and president of Labor's Bankstown state electoral council.

Kearns entered state politics at the 1962 election, winning the safe Labor seat of Bankstown upon the retirement of Spence Powell. He was a strong advocate on issues of social welfare, and was a popular member in what was at the time a rapidly growing working-class area with a high proportion of migrants. He served for a period as Shadow Minister for Youth and Community Services prior to Labor's victory at the 1976 election, but narrowly missed out on a ministerial position afterwards. He had announced his intention to retire at the 1981 election when he died suddenly while on a holiday in the Northern Territory in July 1980.

New South Wales Legislative Assembly
Preceded by Spence Powell	Member for Bankstown; 1962 – 1980	Succeeded by Ric Mochalski
