= Electoral results for the district of Armidale =

Election results for Armidale, New South Wales, Australia

Armidale, an electoral district of the Legislative Assembly in the Australian state of New South Wales, had two incarnations, the first from 1894 to 1920, the second from 1927 to 1981.

| Election | Member | Party |
|---|---|---|
| 1894 | Henry Copeland | Protectionist |
| 1895 | Edmund Lonsdale | Free Trade |
| 1898 | Charles Wilson | Protectionist |
| 1901 | Edmund Lonsdale | Liberal Reform |
| 1903 by | Sydney Kearney | Liberal Reform |
| 1904 | Sydney Kearney | Liberal Reform |
| 1907 | Edmund Lonsdale | Liberal Reform |
| 1910 | Edmund Lonsdale | Liberal Reform |
| 1913 | George Braund | Liberal Reform |
| 1915 by | Herbert Lane | Liberal Reform |
| 1917 | Herbert Lane | Nationalist |
| Election | Member | Party |
| 1927 | David Drummond | Country |
| 1930 | David Drummond | Country |
| 1932 | David Drummond | Country |
| 1935 | David Drummond | Country |
| 1938 | David Drummond | Country |
| 1941 | David Drummond | Country |
| 1944 | David Drummond | Country |
| 1947 | David Drummond | Country |
| 1950 by | Davis Hughes | Country |
| 1950 | Davis Hughes | Country |
| 1953 | Jim Cahill | Labor |
| 1956 | Davis Hughes | Country |
| 1659 | Davis Hughes | Country |
| 1962 | Davis Hughes | Country |
| 1965 | Davis Hughes | Country |
| 1968 | Davis Hughes | Country |
| 1971 | Davis Hughes | Country |
| 1973 by | David Leitch | Country |
| 1973 | David Leitch | Country |
| 1976 | David Leitch | National Country |
| 1978 | Bill McCarthy | Labor |

== Election results ==
=== Elections in the 1970s ===
==== 1978 ====
1978 New South Wales state election: Armidale
| Party | Candidate | Votes | % | ±% |
|---|---|---|---|---|
| Labor | Bill McCarthy | 11,538 | 48.5 | +5.1 |
| National Country | David Leitch | 11,345 | 47.7 | −8.9 |
| Democrats | Sidney Burkey | 890 | 3.7 | +3.7 |
| Total formal votes | | 23,773 | 98.5 | −0.2 |
| Informal votes | | 349 | 1.5 | +0.2 |
| Turnout | | 24,122 | 94.1 | +1.1 |
Two-party-preferred result
| Labor | Bill McCarthy | 12,034 | 50.6 | +7.2 |
| National Country | David Leitch | 11,739 | 49.4 | −7.2 |
| Labor gain from National Country | | Swing | +7.2 | |

==== 1976 ====
1976 New South Wales state election: Armidale
| Party | Candidate | Votes | % | ±% |
|---|---|---|---|---|
| Country | David Leitch | 13,078 | 56.6 | −3.1 |
| Labor | Hubert Legge | 10,024 | 43.4 | +7.2 |
| Total formal votes | | 23,102 | 98.7 | 0.0 |
| Informal votes | | 297 | 1.3 | 0.0 |
| Turnout | | 23,399 | 93.0 | −1.4 |
| Country hold | | Swing | −6.4 | |

==== 1973 ====
1973 New South Wales state election: Armidale
| Party | Candidate | Votes | % | ±% |
|---|---|---|---|---|
| Country | David Leitch | 13,296 | 59.7 | −2.2 |
| Labor | Judith Waters | 8,053 | 36.2 | −1.9 |
| Democratic Labor | Peter McRae | 922 | 4.1 | +4.1 |
| Total formal votes | | 22,271 | 98.7 | |
| Informal votes | | 285 | 1.3 | |
| Turnout | | 22,556 | 94.4 | |
Two-party-preferred result
| Country | David Leitch | 14,033 | 63.0 | +1.1 |
| Labor | Judith Waters | 8,238 | 37.0 | −1.1 |
| Country hold | | Swing | +1.1 | |

==== 1973 by-election ====
1973 Armidale by-election Saturday 17 February
| Party | Candidate | Votes | % | ±% |
|---|---|---|---|---|
| Country | David Leitch | 5,826 | 31.4 | −30.5 |
| Labor | Justin Rowe | 8,282 | 44.7 | |
| Country | Philip Street | 3,738 | 20.2 | |
| Australia | Joan Kersey | 682 | 3.7 | |
| Total formal votes | | 18,528 | 98.7 | +0.3 |
| Informal votes | | 253 | 1.4 | −0.3 |
| Turnout | | 18,781 | 88.9 | −4.3 |
Two-party-preferred result
| Country | David Leitch | 9,612 | 51.9 | −10.0 |
| Labor | Justin Rowe | 8,916 | 48.1 | |
| Country hold | | Swing | −10.0 (Note: compared to the two-candidate-preferred vote at the 1971 Armidale election.) | |

Davis Hughes (Country) resigned to be appointed Agent-General in London.

==== 1971 ====
1971 New South Wales state election: Armidale
| Party | Candidate | Votes | % | ±% |
|---|---|---|---|---|
| Country | Davis Hughes | 11,562 | 61.9 | −5.0 |
| Independent | Jean Mitchell | 7,118 | 38.1 | +38.1 |
| Total formal votes | | 18,680 | 98.3 | |
| Informal votes | | 327 | 1.7 | |
| Turnout | | 19,007 | 93.2 | |
| Country hold | | Swing | −5.0 | |

=== Elections in the 1960s ===
==== 1968 ====
1968 New South Wales state election: Armidale
| Party | Candidate | Votes | % | ±% |
|---|---|---|---|---|
| Country | Davis Hughes | 12,186 | 66.9 | 0.0 |
| Labor | Joseph Dawson | 6,015 | 33.1 | 0.0 |
| Total formal votes | | 18,201 | 1.8 | |
| Informal votes | | 338 | 1.8 | |
| Turnout | | 18,539 | 94.7 | |
| Country hold | | Swing | 0.0 | |

==== 1965 ====
1965 New South Wales state election: Armidale
| Party | Candidate | Votes | % | ±% |
|---|---|---|---|---|
| Country | Davis Hughes | 10,775 | 66.9 | +4.4 |
| Labor | Patrick McGee | 5,322 | 33.1 | −4.4 |
| Total formal votes | | 16,097 | 98.5 | −0.1 |
| Informal votes | | 238 | 1.5 | +0.1 |
| Turnout | | 16,335 | 94.8 | +0.1 |
| Country hold | | Swing | +4.4 | |

==== 1962 ====
1962 New South Wales state election: Armidale
| Party | Candidate | Votes | % | ±% |
|---|---|---|---|---|
| Country | Davis Hughes | 9,959 | 62.5 | +4.2 |
| Labor | Mark Shanahan | 5,966 | 37.5 | −1.0 |
| Total formal votes | | 15,925 | 98.6 | |
| Informal votes | | 225 | 1.4 | |
| Turnout | | 16,150 | 94.7 | |
| Country hold | | Swing | +1.3 | |

=== Elections in the 1950s ===
==== 1959 ====
1959 New South Wales state election: Armidale
| Party | Candidate | Votes | % | ±% |
|---|---|---|---|---|
| Country | Davis Hughes | 9,956 | 56.3 | |
| Labor | Percy Love | 7,170 | 40.5 | |
| Democratic Labor | Richard Stanley | 568 | 3.2 | |
| Total formal votes | | 17,694 | 98.6 | |
| Informal votes | | 242 | 1.4 | |
| Turnout | | 17,936 | 94.2 | |
Two-party-preferred result
| Country | Davis Hughes | 10,410 | 58.8 | |
| Labor | Percy Love | 7,284 | 41.2 | |
| Country hold | | Swing | | |

==== 1956 ====
1956 New South Wales state election: Armidale
| Party | Candidate | Votes | % | ±% |
|---|---|---|---|---|
| Country | Davis Hughes | 9,107 | 52.3 | +2.3 |
| Labor | Jim Cahill | 8,312 | 47.7 | −2.3 |
| Total formal votes | | 17,419 | 98.8 | +0.2 |
| Informal votes | | 218 | 1.2 | −0.2 |
| Turnout | | 17,637 | 93.7 | −1.4 |
| Country gain from Labor | | Swing | +2.3 | |

==== 1953 ====
1953 New South Wales state election: Armidale
| Party | Candidate | Votes | % | ±% |
|---|---|---|---|---|
| Labor | Jim Cahill | 8,595 | 50.04 | |
| Country | Davis Hughes | 8,582 | 49.96 | |
| Total formal votes | | 17,177 | 98.6 | |
| Informal votes | | 240 | 1.4 | |
| Turnout | | 17,417 | 95.1 | |
| Labor gain from Country | | Swing | | |

==== 1950 ====
1950 New South Wales state election: Armidale
| Party | Candidate | Votes | % | ±% |
|---|---|---|---|---|
| Country | Davis Hughes | 7,656 | 49.8 | |
| Labor | Jim Cahill | 7,246 | 47.2 | |
| Independent | Edward Spensley | 458 | 3.0 | |
| Total formal votes | | 15,360 | 98.8 | |
| Informal votes | | 181 | 1.2 | |
| Turnout | | 15,541 | 93.1 | |
Two-party-preferred result
| Country | Davis Hughes | 7,922 | 51.6 | |
| Labor | Jim Cahill | 7,438 | 48.4 | |
| Country hold | | Swing | | |

==== 1950 by-election ====
1950 Armidale by-election Saturday 11 February
| Party | Candidate | Votes | % | ±% |
|---|---|---|---|---|
| Country | Davis Hughes | 4,240 | 32.8 | |
| Labor | Jim Cahill | 6,064 | 46.9 | |
| Country | William Fooks | 2,616 | 20.3 | |
| Total formal votes | | 12,920 | 99.1 | |
| Informal votes | | 124 | 1.0 | |
| Turnout | | 13,044 | 86.1 | |
Two-party-preferred result
| Country | Davis Hughes | 6,652 | 51.5 | |
| Labor | Jim Cahill | 6,268 | 48.5 | |
| Country hold | | | | |

David Drummond (Country) resigned to successfully contest the 1949 election for New England.

=== Elections in the 1940s ===
==== 1947 ====
1947 New South Wales state election: Armidale
| Party | Candidate | Votes | % | ±% |
|---|---|---|---|---|
| Country | David Drummond | 7,616 | 56.0 | +4.7 |
| Labor | Francis Harvison | 5,982 | 44.0 | −4.7 |
| Total formal votes | | 13,598 | 98.8 | +0.9 |
| Informal votes | | 164 | 1.2 | −0.9 |
| Turnout | | 13,762 | 93.2 | +2.4 |
| Country hold | | Swing | +4.7 | |

==== 1944 ====
1944 New South Wales state election: Armidale
| Party | Candidate | Votes | % | ±% |
|---|---|---|---|---|
| Country | David Drummond | 6,731 | 51.3 | −1.0 |
| Labor | Herbert Oxford | 6,380 | 48.7 | +1.0 |
| Total formal votes | | 13,111 | 97.9 | −0.6 |
| Informal votes | | 283 | 2.1 | +0.6 |
| Turnout | | 13,394 | 90.8 | −2.1 |
| Country hold | | Swing | −1.0 | |

==== 1941 ====
1941 New South Wales state election: Armidale
| Party | Candidate | Votes | % | ±% |
|---|---|---|---|---|
| Country | David Drummond | 7,192 | 53.3 | |
| Labor | John Shanahan | 6,308 | 46.7 | |
| Total formal votes | | 13,500 | 98.5 | |
| Informal votes | | 209 | 1.5 | |
| Turnout | | 13,709 | 92.9 | |
| Country hold | | Swing | | |

=== Elections in the 1930s ===
==== 1938 ====
1938 New South Wales state election: Armidale
| Party | Candidate | Votes | % | ±% |
|---|---|---|---|---|
| Country | David Drummond | 7,264 | 56.3 | −43.7 |
| Independent | Charles Hobbs | 4,248 | 33.0 | +33.0 |
| Independent | William Broun | 1,380 | 10.7 | +10.7 |
| Total formal votes | | 12,892 | 97.8 | |
| Informal votes | | 294 | 2.2 | |
| Turnout | | 13,186 | 96.5 | |
| Country hold | | Swing | N/A | |

- Preferences were not distributed.

==== 1935 ====
1935 New South Wales state election: Armidale
| Party | Candidate | Votes | % | ±% |
|---|---|---|---|---|
| Country | David Drummond | unopposed | | |
| Country hold | | | | |

==== 1932 ====
1932 New South Wales state election: Armidale
| Party | Candidate | Votes | % | ±% |
|---|---|---|---|---|
| Country | David Drummond | 8,164 | 66.2 | +14.1 |
| Labor (NSW) | Leonard Dawson | 4,169 | 33.8 | −14.1 |
| Total formal votes | | 12,333 | 98.3 | +1.3 |
| Informal votes | | 218 | 1.7 | −1.3 |
| Turnout | | 12,551 | 96.5 | −3.6 |
| Country hold | | Swing | +14.1 | |

==== 1930 ====
1930 New South Wales state election: Armidale
| Party | Candidate | Votes | % | ±% |
|---|---|---|---|---|
| Country | David Drummond | 6,388 | 52.1 | |
| Labor | Thomas Wilson | 5,872 | 47.9 | |
| Total formal votes | | 12,260 | 97.0 | |
| Informal votes | | 380 | 3.0 | |
| Turnout | | 12,640 | 99.1 | |
| Country hold | | Swing | | |

=== Elections in the 1920s ===
==== 1927 ====
1927 New South Wales state election: Armidale
| Party | Candidate | Votes | % | ±% |
|---|---|---|---|---|
| Country | David Drummond | 7,620 | 62.7 | |
| Labor | Alfred McClelland (defeated) | 4,539 | 37.3 | |
| Total formal votes | | 12,159 | 98.9 | |
| Informal votes | | 137 | 1.1 | |
| Turnout | | 12,296 | 83.1 | |
| Country win | | (new seat) | | |

==== 1920 - 1927 ====
District abolished

=== Elections in the 1910s ===
==== 1917 ====
1917 New South Wales state election: Armidale
| Party | Candidate | Votes | % | ±% |
|---|---|---|---|---|
| Nationalist | Herbert Lane | 3,459 | 56.5 | +0.6 |
| Labor | John Andrews | 2,661 | 43.5 | −0.6 |
| Total formal votes | | 6,120 | 99.2 | +1.8 |
| Informal votes | | 46 | 0.8 | −1.8 |
| Turnout | | 6,166 | 62.0 | −11.5 |
| Nationalist hold | | Swing | +0.6 | |

==== 1915 by-election ====
1915 Armidale by-election Saturday 18 September
| Party | Candidate | Votes | % | ±% |
|---|---|---|---|---|
| Liberal Reform | Herbert Lane | unopposed | | |
| Liberal Reform hold | | | | |

George Braund was killed in action at Gallipoli.

==== 1913 ====
1913 New South Wales state election: Armidale
| Party | Candidate | Votes | % | ±% |
|---|---|---|---|---|
| Liberal Reform | George Braund (Note: Also endorsed by Farmers and Settlers.) | 3,939 | 55.9 | |
| Labor | John Eather | 3,112 | 44.1 | |
| Total formal votes | | 7,051 | 97.4 | |
| Informal votes | | 185 | 2.6 | |
| Turnout | | 7,236 | 73.5 | |
| Liberal Reform hold | | | | |

==== 1910 ====
1910 New South Wales state election: Armidale
| Party | Candidate | Votes | % | ±% |
|---|---|---|---|---|
| Liberal Reform | Edmund Lonsdale | 3,407 | 51.3 | |
| Labour | Francis Bryant | 3,232 | 48.7 | |
| Total formal votes | | 6,639 | 98.3 | |
| Informal votes | | 116 | 1.7 | |
| Turnout | | 6,755 | 73.9 | |
| Liberal Reform hold | | | | |

=== Elections in the 1900s ===
==== 1907 ====
1907 New South Wales state election: Armidale
| Party | Candidate | Votes | % | ±% |
|---|---|---|---|---|
| Liberal Reform | Edmund Lonsdale | 2,964 | 52.0 | |
| Labour | Michael MacMahon | 2,741 | 48.1 | |
| Total formal votes | | 5,705 | 97.3 | |
| Informal votes | | 158 | 2.7 | |
| Turnout | | 5,863 | 68.4 | |
| Liberal Reform hold | | | | |

==== 1904 ====
1904 New South Wales state election: Armidale
| Party | Candidate | Votes | % | ±% |
|---|---|---|---|---|
| Liberal Reform | Sydney Kearney | 2,124 | 50.7 | |
| Progressive | Michael MacMahon | 2,067 | 49.3 | |
| Total formal votes | | 4,191 | 99.4 | |
| Informal votes | | 25 | 0.6 | |
| Turnout | | 4,216 | 55.9 | |
| Liberal Reform hold | | | | |

Armidale was expanded to include part of the abolished seat of Uralla-Walcha. Sydney Kearney was the member for Armidale while Michael MacMahon was the member for Uralla-Walcha.

==== 1903 by-election ====
1903 Armidale by-election Saturday 12 December
| Party | Candidate | Votes | % | ±% |
|---|---|---|---|---|
| Liberal Reform | Sydney Kearney | 642 | 45.2 | −5.6 |
| Independent | Charles Wilson | 470 | 33.1 | −16.2 |
| Labour | William Watson | 309 | 21.8 | +21.8 |
| Total formal votes | | 1,421 | 99.2 | +0.4 |
| Informal votes | | 11 | 0.8 | −0.4 |
| Turnout | | 1,432 | 54.1 (Note: based on a roll of 2,648 at the 1901 election.) | −16.3 |
| Liberal Reform hold | | Swing | −5.6 | |

Edmund Lonsdale resigned to successfully contest the federal seat of New England.

==== 1901 ====
1901 New South Wales state election: Armidale
| Party | Candidate | Votes | % | ±% |
|---|---|---|---|---|
| Liberal Reform | Edmund Lonsdale | 935 | 50.8 | +7.1 |
| Progressive | Charles Wilson | 907 | 49.2 | −7.1 |
| Total formal votes | | 1,842 | 98.8 | −0.6 |
| Informal votes | | 22 | 1.2 | +0.6 |
| Turnout | | 1,864 | 70.4 | −8.4 |
| Liberal Reform gain from Progressive | | | | |

=== Elections in the 1890s ===
==== 1898 ====
1898 New South Wales colonial election: Armidale
| Party | Candidate | Votes | % | ±% |
|---|---|---|---|---|
| National Federal | Charles Wilson | 1,020 | 56.3 | |
| Free Trade | Edmund Lonsdale | 792 | 43.7 | |
| Total formal votes | | 0 | 100.0 | |
| Informal votes | | 0 | 0.0 | |
| Turnout | | 0 | 0.0 | |
| National Federal gain from Free Trade | | | | |

==== 1895 ====
1895 New South Wales colonial election: Armidale
| Party | Candidate | Votes | % | ±% |
|---|---|---|---|---|
| Free Trade | Edmund Lonsdale | 891 | 50.4 | |
| Protectionist | Henry Copeland | 876 | 49.6 | |
| Total formal votes | | 1,767 | 99.6 | |
| Informal votes | | 8 | 0.5 | |
| Turnout | | 1,775 | 71.2 | |
| Free Trade gain from Protectionist | | | | |

==== 1894 ====
1894 New South Wales colonial election: Armidale
| Party | Candidate | Votes | % | ±% |
|---|---|---|---|---|
| Protectionist | Henry Copeland | 820 | 38.4 | |
| Free Trade | Edmund Lonsdale | 684 | 32.0 | |
| Labour | George Beeby | 632 | 29.6 | |
| Total formal votes | | 2,136 | 99.4 | |
| Informal votes | | 14 | 0.7 | |
| Turnout | | 2,150 | 84.3 | |
| Protectionist win | | (new seat) | | |

Henry Copeland (Protectionist) and Edmund Lonsdale (Free Trade) were sitting members for New England. The third member for New England, James Inglis (Free Trade) did not contest the election.
