= Results of the 1971 New South Wales state election (Legislative Assembly) =

State election for New South Wales, Australia in February 1971

New South Wales state election, 13 February 1971 Legislative Assembly << 1968–1973 >>
Enrolled voters	2,457,021 (Note: There were 2,496,868 enrolled voters but 39,847 were enrolled in electorates (one Labor and one Country) which were uncontested at the election.)				
Votes cast	2,291,484		Turnout	93.26	-0.93
Informal votes	53,628		Informal	2.34	-0.29
Summary of votes by party
Party	Primary votes	%	Swing	Seats	Change
Labor	1,007,538	45.02	+1.93	45	+ 6
Liberal	799,801	35.74	–2.73	32	– 4
Country	193,509	8.65	–1.98	17	± 0
Democratic Labor	71,050	3.17	+0.89	0	± 0
Australia	23,689	1.06	+1.06	0	± 0
Defence of Government Schools	10,850	0.48	+0.48	0	± 0
Communist	2,098	0.09	–0.18	0	± 0
Independent	129,321	5.78	+0.53	2	± 0
Total	2,237,856			96	

This is a list of electoral district results for the 1971 New South Wales state election.

== Results by Electoral district ==
=== Albury ===
1971 New South Wales state election: Albury
Party	Candidate	Votes	%	±%
Liberal	Gordon Mackie	9,360	51.4	−6.9
Labor	Kevin Esler	6,881	37.8	+5.8
Democratic Labor	Anthony Quinn	1,965	10.8	+1.1
Total formal votes		18,206	98.4	
Informal votes		292	1.6	
Turnout		18,498	91.7	
Two-party-preferred result
Liberal	Gordon Mackie	10,932	60.0	−6.1
Labor	Kevin Esler	7,274	40.0	+6.1
Liberal hold		Swing	−6.1	

=== Armidale ===
1971 New South Wales state election: Armidale
Party	Candidate	Votes	%	±%
Country	Davis Hughes	11,562	61.9	−5.0
Independent	Jean Mitchell	7,118	38.1	+38.1
Total formal votes		18,680	98.3	
Informal votes		327	1.7	
Turnout		19,007	93.2	
Country hold		Swing	−5.0	

=== Ashfield ===
1971 New South Wales state election: Ashfield
Party	Candidate	Votes	%	±%
Liberal	David Hunter	10,618	44.9	−12.0
Labor	Bede Spillane	10,301	43.5	+0.4
Democratic Labor	Joseph Conroy	1,443	6.1	+6.1
Australia	David Eden	1,309	5.5	+5.5
Total formal votes		23,671	96.0	
Informal votes		990	4.0	
Turnout		24,661	90.7	
Two-party-preferred result
Liberal	David Hunter	12,316	52.0	−4.9
Labor	Bede Spillane	11,355	48.0	+4.9
Liberal hold		Swing	−4.9	

=== Auburn ===
1971 New South Wales state election: Auburn
Party	Candidate	Votes	%	±%
Labor	Peter Cox	17,074	67.7	+3.2
Liberal	William McIntyre	8,150	32.3	−3.2
Total formal votes		25,224	97.6	
Informal votes		609	2.4	
Turnout		25,833	94.2	
Labor hold		Swing	+3.2	

=== Balmain ===
1971 New South Wales state election: Balmain
Party	Candidate	Votes	%	±%
Labor	Roger Degen	17,358	73.0	+23.0
Liberal	Robert Ward	6,423	27.0	+3.2
Total formal votes		23,781	95.9	
Informal votes		1,021	4.1	
Turnout		24,802	91.4	
Labor hold		Swing	+3.9	

=== Bankstown ===
1971 New South Wales state election: Bankstown
Party	Candidate	Votes	%	±%
Labor	Nick Kearns	17,115	63.9	+4.6
Liberal	John Ghent	9,683	36.1	−4.6
Total formal votes		26,798	97.3	
Informal votes		750	2.7	
Turnout		27,548	94.6	
Labor hold		Swing	+4.6	

=== Barwon ===
1971 New South Wales state election: Barwon
Party	Candidate	Votes	%	±%
Country	Geoff Crawford	8,464	50.7	−2.5
Labor	Peter Prentice	6,467	38.8	+6.6
Independent	David Aiken	979	5.9	+5.9
Australia	Thomas Broadbent	475	2.9	+2.9
Independent	Wallace Ridley	306	1.8	+1.8
Total formal votes		16,691	98.0	
Informal votes		339	2.0	
Turnout		17,030	88.0	
Two-party-preferred result
Country	Geoff Crawford	9,469	56.7	−6.6
Labor	Peter Prentice	7,222	43.3	+6.6
Country hold		Swing	−6.6	

=== Bass Hill ===
1971 New South Wales state election: Bass Hill
Party	Candidate	Votes	%	±%
Labor	Clarrie Earl	18,608	66.8	+10.4
Liberal	Doreen Ghent	9,242	33.2	−10.4
Total formal votes		27,850	97.1	
Informal votes		836	2.9	
Turnout		28,686	94.3	
Labor hold		Swing	+10.4	

=== Bathurst ===
1971 New South Wales state election: Bathurst
Party	Candidate	Votes	%	±%
Country	Clive Osborne	9,631	50.7	−7.9
Labor	Michael Connolly	8,503	44.8	+3.4
Australia	Deryck Barnes	849	4.5	+4.5
Total formal votes		18,983	98.9	
Informal votes		212	1.1	
Turnout		19,195	96.2	
Two-party-preferred result
Country	Clive Osborne	9,843	51.9	−6.7
Labor	Michael Connolly	9,140	48.1	+6.7
Country hold		Swing	−6.7	

=== Blacktown ===
1971 New South Wales state election: Blacktown
Party	Candidate	Votes	%	±%
Labor	Gordon Barnier	17,174	59.4	+2.4
Liberal	Hilton Robinson	9,081	31.4	−4.0
Democratic Labor	Charles Ormel	1,702	5.9	−1.7
Independent	George Nicolaidis	976	3.4	+3.4
Total formal votes		28,933	97.4	
Informal votes		785	2.6	
Turnout		29,718	93.1	
Two-party-preferred result
Labor	Gordon Barnier	18,002	62.2	+3.3
Liberal	Hilton Robinson	10,931	37.8	−3.3
Labor hold		Swing	+3.3	

=== Bligh ===
1971 New South Wales state election: Bligh
Party	Candidate	Votes	%	±%
Liberal	John Barraclough	14,104	58.8	
Labor	Maurice Allen	6,522	27.2	
Independent	Francis Claffy	1,387	5.8	
Abortion Law Reform	Bridget Gilling	899	3.8	
Democratic Labor	Dominique Droulers	696	2.9	
Independent	Merilyn Giesekam	202	0.8	
Independent	Thomas Smith	170	0.7	
Total formal votes		23,980	96.2	
Informal votes		953	3.8	
Turnout		24,933	86.6	
Two-party-preferred result
Liberal	John Barraclough	16,058	67.0	−1.9
Labor	Maurice Allen	7,922	33.0	+1.9
Liberal hold		Swing	−1.9	

=== Blue Mountains ===
1971 New South Wales state election: Blue Mountains
Party	Candidate	Votes	%	±%
Independent	Harold Coates	11,271	54.8	−2.0
Labor	James Collins	8,101	39.4	−1.1
Democratic Labor	Kenneth Brown	812	3.9	+1.2
Independent	Frederick Lamb	399	1.9	+1.9
Total formal votes		20,583	98.8	
Informal votes		248	1.2	
Turnout		20,831	94.9	
Two-candidate-preferred result
Independent	Harold Coates	11,877	57.7	−0.5
Labor	James Collins	8,786	42.3	+0.5
Independent hold		Swing	−0.5	

=== Broken Hill ===
1971 New South Wales state election: Broken Hill
Party	Candidate	Votes	%	±%
Labor	Lew Johnstone	unopposed		
Labor hold				

=== Burrendong ===
1971 New South Wales state election: Burrendong
Party	Candidate	Votes	%	±%
Labor	Leo Nott	9,576	51.8	+13.4
Country	Roger Wotton	8,925	48.2	+14.5
Total formal votes		18,501	99.0	
Informal votes		194	1.0	
Turnout		18,695	94.3	
Labor gain from Country		Swing	+7.7	

=== Burrinjuck ===
1971 New South Wales state election: Burrinjuck
Party	Candidate	Votes	%	±%
Labor	Bill Sheahan	11,053	58.5	+4.3
Country	Edward O'Connor	4,306	22.8	−4.9
Liberal	Leon Garry	3,535	18.7	+4.9
Total formal votes		18,894	99.2	
Informal votes		153	0.8	
Turnout		19,047	95.3	
Two-party-preferred result
Labor	Bill Sheahan	11,300	59.8	+3.9
Country	Edward O'Connor	7,594	40.2	−3.9
Labor hold		Swing	+3.9	

=== Burwood ===
1971 New South Wales state election: Burwood
Party	Candidate	Votes	%	±%
Liberal	John Jackett	12,476	51.6	−0.1
Labor	Phil O'Neill	8,184	33.8	+4.3
Independent	Ben Doig	3,091	12.8	−6.0
Communist	Jack Mundey	441	1.8	+1.8
Total formal votes		24,192	97.4	
Informal votes		633	2.6	
Turnout		24,825	91.3	
Two-party-preferred result
Liberal	John Jackett	15,164	62.7	−4.8
Labor	Phil O'Neill	9,028	37.3	+4.8
Liberal hold		Swing	−4.8	

=== Byron ===
1971 New South Wales state election: Byron
Party	Candidate	Votes	%	±%
Country	Stanley Stephens	9,476	54.5	−5.8
Labor	James Constable	7,905	45.5	+5.8
Total formal votes		17,381	98.5	
Informal votes		259	1.5	
Turnout		17,640	91.9	
Country hold		Swing	−5.8	

=== Campbelltown ===
1971 New South Wales state election: Campbelltown
Party	Candidate	Votes	%	±%
Labor	Cliff Mallam	13,339	50.1	+2.5
Liberal	Max Dunbier	13,310	49.9	−2.5
Total formal votes		26,649	97.2	
Informal votes		773	2.8	
Turnout		27,422	93.0	
Labor gain from Liberal		Swing	+2.5	

=== Canterbury ===
1971 New South Wales state election: Canterbury
Party	Candidate	Votes	%	±%
Labor	Kevin Stewart	15,711	62.5	+7.3
Liberal	Jack Backer	9,431	37.5	−2.6
Total formal votes		25,142	96.3	
Informal votes		970	3.7	
Turnout		26,112	93.3	
Labor hold		Swing	+4.0	

=== Casino ===
1971 New South Wales state election: Casino
Party	Candidate	Votes	%	±%
Labor	Don Day	9,135	52.5	+17.1
Country	Charles Yabsley	8,281	47.5	−17.1
Total formal votes		17,416	99.0	
Informal votes		179	1.0	
Turnout		17,595	93.8	
Labor notional gain from Country		Swing	+17.1	

=== Castlereagh ===
1971 New South Wales state election: Castlereagh
Party	Candidate	Votes	%	±%
Labor	Jack Renshaw	9,359	56.4	+3.2
Country	Albert Green	3,575	21.5	−3.0
Liberal	Bruce Fry	2,756	16.6	−5.7
Democratic Labor	John Gough	904	5.5	+5.5
Total formal votes		16,594	98.5	
Informal votes		245	1.5	
Turnout		16,839	87.1	
Two-party-preferred result
Labor	Jack Renshaw	9,733	58.7	+3.9
Country	Albert Green	6,861	41.3	−3.9
Labor hold		Swing	+3.9	

=== Cessnock ===
1971 New South Wales state election: Cessnock
Party	Candidate	Votes	%	±%
Labor	George Neilly	16,251	80.4	+14.5
Liberal	John Thomas	3,972	19.6	+19.6
Total formal votes		20,223	98.8	
Informal votes		251	1.2	
Turnout		20,474	96.0	
Labor hold		Swing	+14.5	

=== Charlestown ===
1971 New South Wales state election: Charlestown
Party	Candidate	Votes	%	±%
Labor	Jack Stewart	15,043	54.7	−4.3
Liberal	Alfred Pickering	10,027	36.4	−4.6
Democratic Labor	Hugh Ansell	1,438	5.2	+5.2
Australia	Charles Hockings	1,011	3.7	+3.7
Total formal votes		27,519	98.5	
Informal votes		422	1.5	
Turnout		27,941	94.7	
Two-party-preferred result
Labor	Jack Stewart	16,039	58.3	−0.7
Liberal	Alfred Pickering	11,480	41.7	+0.7
Labor notional hold		Swing	−0.7	

=== Clarence ===
1971 New South Wales state election: Clarence
Party	Candidate	Votes	%	±%
Labor	Thomas Cronin	7,298	36.1	+36.1
Country	Matt Singleton	7,092	35.1	−29.2
Independent	Neville Weiley	2,732	13.5	+13.5
Independent	Clarice McClymont	1,947	9.6	+9.6
Country	Francis Clark	1,127	5.6	+5.6
Total formal votes		20,196	98.0	
Informal votes		408	2.0	
Turnout		20,604	95.3	
Two-party-preferred result
Country	Matt Singleton	11,131	55.1	−9.2
Labor	Thomas Cronin	9,065	44.9	+44.9
Country hold		Swing	−9.2	

=== Collaroy ===
1971 New South Wales state election: Collaroy
Party	Candidate	Votes	%	±%
Liberal	Robert Askin	15,492	62.0	−9.0
Australia	Brian Walker	4,922	19.7	+19.7
Independent	Frederick Adcock	2,429	9.7	+9.7
Democratic Labor	Lyle Antcliff	1,554	6.2	+6.2
Independent	Norman Ward	599	2.4	+2.4
Total formal votes		24,996	96.7	
Informal votes		841	3.3	
Turnout		25,837	91.0	
Two-candidate-preferred result
Liberal	Robert Askin	17,783	71.1	+0.1
Australia	Brian Walker	7,213	28.9	+28.9
Liberal hold		Swing	+0.1	

=== Coogee ===
1971 New South Wales state election: Coogee
Party	Candidate	Votes	%	±%
Liberal	Kevin Ellis	12,231	46.6	−4.0
Labor	Mary Barry	11,109	42.4	+0.5
Democratic Labor	Betty Stepkovitch	1,187	4.5	−0.7
Defence of Government Schools	Jean McCoroskin	967	3.7	+3.7
Independent	William Ash	725	2.8	+2.8
Total formal votes		26,219	97.4	
Informal votes		707	2.6	
Turnout		26,926	90.9	
Two-party-preferred result
Liberal	Kevin Ellis	13,860	52.9	−3.0
Labor	Mary Barry	12,359	47.1	+3.0
Liberal hold		Swing	−3.0	

=== Cook's River ===
1971 New South Wales state election: Cook's River
Party	Candidate	Votes	%	±%
Labor	Tom Cahill	17,427	66.1	+1.0
Liberal	Kenneth McKimm	8,920	33.9	−1.0
Total formal votes		26,347	96.3	
Informal votes		1,010	3.7	
Turnout		27,357	92.2	
Labor hold		Swing	+1.0	

=== Corrimal ===
1971 New South Wales state election: Corrimal
Party	Candidate	Votes	%	±%
Labor	Laurie Kelly	18,311	67.5	+13.4
Liberal	Eric Blain	6,920	25.5	−2.9
Democratic Labor	Raymond Proust	1,386	5.1	+5.1
Communist	Reginald Wilding	511	1.9	+1.9
Total formal votes		27,128	97.7	
Informal votes		645	2.3	
Turnout		27,773	95.4	
Two-party-preferred result
Labor	Laurie Kelly	18,997	70.0	+5.9
Liberal	Eric Blain	8,131	30.0	−5.9
Labor hold		Swing	+5.9	

=== Cronulla ===
1971 New South Wales state election: Cronulla
Party	Candidate	Votes	%	±%
Liberal	Ian Griffith	13,683	50.1	−9.1
Labor	Michael Egan	11,510	42.2	+6.7
Defence of Government Schools	Robin Alleway	2,097	7.7	+7.7
Total formal votes		27,290	98.6	
Informal votes		386	1.4	
Turnout		27,676	94.7	
Two-party-preferred result
Liberal	Ian Griffith	14,314	52.5	−8.4
Labor	Michael Egan	12,976	47.5	+8.4
Liberal hold		Swing	−8.4	

=== Davidson ===
1971 New South Wales state election: Davidson
Party	Candidate	Votes	%	±%
Liberal	Dick Healey	18,119	80.2	
Democratic Labor	Thomas Colman	4,484	19.8	
Total formal votes		22,603	94.3	
Informal votes		1,363	5.7	
Turnout		23,966	92.7	
Liberal notional hold		Swing	N/A	

Dick Healey (Liberal) was the sitting member for Wakehurst

=== Drummoyne ===
1971 New South Wales state election: Drummoyne
Party	Candidate	Votes	%	±%
Labor	Reg Coady	14,198	57.0	+7.5
Liberal	Colin Gardiner	10,700	43.0	−3.2
Total formal votes		24,898	97.4	
Informal votes		675	2.6	
Turnout		25,573	93.7	
Labor hold		Swing	+5.3	

=== Dubbo ===
1971 New South Wales state election: Dubbo
Party	Candidate	Votes	%	±%
Liberal	John Mason	10,598	51.8	−13.4
Labor	Norman Cox	8,229	40.2	+5.3
Democratic Labor	Terence Catley	1,639	8.0	+8.0
Total formal votes		20,466	98.7	
Informal votes		279	1.3	
Turnout		20,745	94.2	
Two-party-preferred result
Liberal	John Mason	11,909	58.2	−7.0
Labor	Norman Cox	8,557	41.8	+7.0
Liberal hold		Swing	−7.0	

=== Earlwood ===
1971 New South Wales state election: Earlwood
Party	Candidate	Votes	%	±%
Liberal	Eric Willis	14,815	57.3	−5.4
Labor	Barry Robinson	11,044	42.7	+5.4
Total formal votes		25,859	97.9	
Informal votes		544	2.1	
Turnout		26,403	95.8	
Liberal hold		Swing	−5.4	

=== East Hills ===
1971 New South Wales state election: East Hills
Party	Candidate	Votes	%	±%
Labor	Joe Kelly	17,021	56.9	+4.4
Liberal	Albert Hurley	6,387	21.3	−2.9
Independent	Harold McIlveen	3,942	13.2	−10.1
Independent	Raymond Buchanan	2,572	8.6	+8.6
Total formal votes		29,922	98.0	
Informal votes		605	2.0	
Turnout		30,527	95.7	
Two-party-preferred result
Labor	Joe Kelly	18,976	63.4	+4.0
Liberal	Albert Hurley	10,946	36.6	−4.0
Labor hold		Swing	+4.0	

=== Eastwood ===
1971 New South Wales state election: Eastwood
Party	Candidate	Votes	%	±%
Liberal	Jim Clough	15,491	59.2	−10.5
Labor	John McMahon	8,211	31.4	+1.1
Independent	Olwyn Mackenzie	2,454	9.4	+9.4
Total formal votes		26,156	98.1	
Informal votes		518	1.9	
Turnout		26,674	93.0	
Two-party-preferred result
Liberal	Jim Clough	16,960	64.8	−4.9
Labor	John McMahon	9,196	35.2	+4.9
Liberal hold		Swing	−4.9	

=== Fairfield ===
1971 New South Wales state election: Fairfield
Party	Candidate	Votes	%	±%
Labor	Eric Bedford	17,172	64.3	+6.8
Liberal	John Woods	8,506	31.9	−10.6
Independent	Edward Oldfield	1,023	3.8	+3.8
Total formal votes		26,701	96.1	
Informal votes		1,091	3.9	
Turnout		27,792	93.7	
Two-party-preferred result
Labor	Eric Bedford	17,684	66.2	+8.7
Liberal	John Woods	9,017	33.8	−8.7
Labor hold		Swing	+8.7	

=== Fuller ===
1971 New South Wales state election: Fuller
Party	Candidate	Votes	%	±%
Liberal	Peter Coleman	12,314	46.2	−2.9
Labor	Anthony Bellanto	11,517	43.2	−3.6
Defence of Government Schools	Dudley Abbott	1,541	5.8	+5.8
Democratic Labor	Kevin Davis	1,297	4.9	+0.8
Total formal votes		26,669	98.0	
Informal votes		543	2.0	
Turnout		27,212	94.3	
Two-party-preferred result
Liberal	Peter Coleman	13,906	52.1	−0.6
Labor	Anthony Bellanto	12,763	47.9	+0.6
Liberal hold		Swing	−0.6	

=== Georges River ===
1971 New South Wales state election: Georges River
Party	Candidate	Votes	%	±%
Labor	Frank Walker	13,319	51.4	+7.6
Liberal	Vince Bruce	12,573	48.6	−7.6
Total formal votes		25,892	98.5	
Informal votes		382	1.5	
Turnout		26,274	95.7	
Labor gain from Liberal		Swing	+7.6	

=== Gloucester ===
1971 New South Wales state election: Gloucester
Party	Candidate	Votes	%	±%
Country	Leon Punch	12,720	62.1	+2.3
Labor	Terence Wallis	5,664	27.6	+4.5
Independent	James Bogan	2,112	10.3	+10.3
Total formal votes		20,496	98.9	
Informal votes		217	1.1	
Turnout		20,713	93.8	
Two-party-preferred result
Country	Leon Punch	13,987	68.2	−4.5
Labor	Terence Wallis	6,509	31.8	+4.5
Country hold		Swing	−4.5	

=== Gordon ===
1971 New South Wales state election: Gordon
Party	Candidate	Votes	%	±%
Liberal	Harry Jago	20,074	81.6	−0.2
Democratic Labor	Allan Dwyer	4,530	18.4	+12.9
Total formal votes		24,604	94.4	
Informal votes		1,452	5.6	
Turnout		26,056	91.8	
Liberal hold		Swing	−4.6	

=== Gosford ===
1971 New South Wales state election: Gosford
Party	Candidate	Votes	%	±%
Labor	Keith O'Connell	15,105	48.9	+1.0
Liberal	Ted Humphries	13,926	45.1	−3.6
Independent	Wallace Cook	944	3.1	+3.1
Australia	Barry Phillips	903	2.9	+2.9
Total formal votes		30,878	98.9	
Informal votes		352	1.1	
Turnout		31,230	94.8	
Two-party-preferred result
Labor	Keith O'Connell	16,233	52.6	+4.0
Liberal	Ted Humphries	14,645	47.4	−4.0
Labor gain from Liberal		Swing	+4.0	

=== Goulburn ===
1971 New South Wales state election: Goulburn
Party	Candidate	Votes	%	±%
Country	Ron Brewer	11,882	62.0	−2.9
Labor	Norman Barnwell	7,267	38.0	+6.2
Total formal votes		19,149	98.9	
Informal votes		206	1.1	
Turnout		19,355	95.9	
Country hold		Swing	−4.3	

=== Granville ===
1971 New South Wales state election: Granville
Party	Candidate	Votes	%	±%
Labor	Pat Flaherty	17,353	67.3	+6.5
Liberal	George Ajaka	8,430	32.7	−6.5
Total formal votes		25,783	97.3	
Informal votes		712	2.7	
Turnout		26,495	93.3	
Labor hold		Swing	+6.5	

=== Hawkesbury ===
1971 New South Wales state election: Hawkesbury
Party	Candidate	Votes	%	±%
Liberal	Bernie Deane	12,359	49.9	
Labor	Walter Brown	10,801	43.6	
Independent	Charles Rogers	1,628	6.6	
Total formal votes		24,788	97.5	
Informal votes		632	2.5	
Turnout		25,420	91.4	
Two-party-preferred result
Liberal	Bernie Deane	13,634	55.0	−7.0
Labor	Walter Brown	11,154	45.0	+7.0
Liberal hold		Swing	−7.0	

=== Heathcote ===
1971 New South Wales state election: Heathcote
Party	Candidate	Votes	%	±%
Labor	Rex Jackson	16,426	58.5	
Liberal	Evelyn Thompson	9,433	33.6	
Defence of Government Schools	Edna McGill	2,233	7.9	
Total formal votes		28,092	98.3	
Informal votes		480	1.7	
Turnout		28,572	95.5	
Two-party-preferred result
Labor	Rex Jackson	17,766	63.2	+6.2
Liberal	Evelyn Thompson	10,326	36.8	−6.2
Labor notional hold		Swing	+6.2	

=== Hornsby ===
1971 New South Wales state election: Hornsby
Party	Candidate	Votes	%	±%
Liberal	John Maddison	13,938	54.4	−14.7
Independent	David Hill	7,200	28.1	+28.1
Australia	George Black	2,825	11.0	+11.0
Democratic Labor	Anthony Felton	1,668	6.5	+0.7
Total formal votes		25,631	98.1	
Informal votes		491	1.9	
Turnout		26,122	93.6	
Two-candidate-preferred result
Liberal	John Maddison	16,185	63.1	−10.6
Independent	David Hill	9,446	36.9	+36.9
Liberal hold		Swing	−10.6	

=== Hurstville ===
1971 New South Wales state election: Hurstville
Party	Candidate	Votes	%	±%
Liberal	Tom Mead	12,653	47.4	−5.2
Labor	Kenneth Hallen	10,810	40.5	−2.3
Democratic Labor	Peter Abrams	1,419	5.3	+0.6
Defence of Government Schools	Judith Sainsbury	964	3.6	+3.6
Australia	Ralph Catts	873	3.3	+3.3
Total formal votes		26,719	97.5	
Informal votes		673	2.5	
Turnout		27,392	95.0	
Two-party-preferred result
Liberal	Tom Mead	14,115	52.8	−3.2
Labor	Kenneth Hallen	12,604	47.2	+3.2
Liberal hold		Swing	−3.2	

=== Illawarra ===
1971 New South Wales state election: Illawarra
Party	Candidate	Votes	%	±%
Labor	George Petersen	16,612	59.7	−2.1
Liberal	Lorna Shacklock	4,836	17.4	−10.7
Independent	Frank Arkell	3,361	12.1	+12.1
Independent	Raymond Clay	1,759	6.3	+6.3
Democratic Labor	Edward Himmelreich	1,237	4.4	+4.4
Total formal votes		27,805	96.8	
Informal votes		920	3.2	
Turnout		28,725	95.0	
Two-party-preferred result
Labor	George Petersen	19,763	71.1	+4.4
Liberal	Lorna Shacklock	8,042	28.9	−4.4
Labor notional hold		Swing	+4.4	

=== King ===
1971 New South Wales state election: King
Party	Candidate	Votes	%	±%
Labor	Albert Sloss	16,918	71.2	+4.0
Liberal	Andrew Bush	4,628	19.5	−0.4
Communist	Doris Jobling	1,146	4.8	−4.3
Independent	Ernest Williams	1,060	4.5	+4.5
Total formal votes		23,752	94.1	
Informal votes		1,478	5.9	
Turnout		25,230	88.7	
Two-party-preferred result
Labor	Albert Sloss	18,408	77.5	+1.1
Liberal	Andrew Bush	5,344	22.5	−1.1
Labor hold		Swing	+1.1	

=== Kirribilli ===
1971 New South Wales state election: Kirribilli
Party	Candidate	Votes	%	±%
Liberal	John Waddy	13,171	55.1	−7.0
Labor	William Harkness	7,200	30.1	−2.2
Democratic Labor	Michael Fitzpatrick	2,814	11.8	+6.2
Independent	Romaulds Kemps	708	3.0	+3.0
Total formal votes		23,893	97.6	
Informal votes		575	2.4	
Turnout		24,468	87.2	
Two-party-preferred result
Liberal	John Waddy	15,776	66.0	−0.6
Labor	William Harkness	8,117	34.0	+0.6
Liberal hold		Swing	−0.6	

=== Kogarah ===
1971 New South Wales state election: Kogarah
Party	Candidate	Votes	%	±%
Labor	Bill Crabtree	13,438	52.4	+1.6
Liberal	William Marshall	10,485	40.9	−4.6
Independent	Margot Caulfield	1,708	6.7	+6.7
Total formal votes		25,631	98.1	
Informal votes		495	1.9	
Turnout		26,126	94.7	
Two-party-preferred result
Labor	Bill Crabtree	14,463	56.4	+5.1
Liberal	William Marshall	11,168	43.6	−5.1
Labor hold		Swing	+5.1	

=== Lake Macquarie ===
1971 New South Wales state election: Lake Macquarie
Party	Candidate	Votes	%	±%
Labor	Merv Hunter	17,754	64.9	+0.5
Liberal	Richard Bevan	9,589	35.1	−0.5
Total formal votes		27,343	98.4	
Informal votes		438	1.6	
Turnout		27,781	95.4	
Labor hold		Swing	+0.5	

=== Lakemba ===
1971 New South Wales state election: Lakemba
Party	Candidate	Votes	%	±%
Labor	Vince Durick	15,384	59.4	+7.1
Liberal	James Dixon	10,515	40.6	+3.6
Total formal votes		25,899	97.4	
Informal votes		692	2.6	
Turnout		26,591	93.6	
Labor hold		Swing	+1.8	

=== Lane Cove ===
1971 New South Wales state election: Lane Cove
Party	Candidate	Votes	%	±%
Liberal	Ken McCaw	15,494	59.3	−11.5
Labor	Ronald Gornall	5,854	22.4	−1.2
Australia	Malcolm Hilbery	3,208	12.3	+12.3
Democratic Labor	Reginald Lawson	1,590	6.1	+0.5
Total formal votes		26,146	98.4	
Informal votes		427	1.6	
Turnout		26,573	91.5	
Two-party-preferred result
Liberal	Ken McCaw	18,077	69.1	−6.1
Labor	Ronald Gornall	8,069	30.9	+6.1
Liberal hold		Swing	−6.1	

=== Lismore ===
1971 New South Wales state election: Lismore
Party	Candidate	Votes	%	±%
Country	Bruce Duncan	unopposed		
Country hold				

=== Liverpool ===
1971 New South Wales state election: Liverpool
Party	Candidate	Votes	%	±%
Labor	George Paciullo	18,241	66.7	+10.5
Liberal	Robert Leech	6,404	23.4	−12.8
Democratic Labor	William Arundell	2,692	9.9	+4.2
Total formal votes		27,337	97.3	
Informal votes		755	2.7	
Turnout		28,092	93.4	
Two-party-preferred result
Labor	George Paciullo	18,779	68.7	+7.3
Liberal	Robert Leech	8,558	31.3	−7.3
Labor hold		Swing	+7.3	

=== Maitland ===
1971 New South Wales state election: Maitland
Party	Candidate	Votes	%	±%
Liberal	Milton Morris	11,470	56.0	−10.2
Labor	Francis Murray	7,721	37.7	+9.2
Democratic Labor	Herbert Collins	1,299	6.3	+1.0
Total formal votes		20,490	98.7	
Informal votes		260	1.3	
Turnout		20,750	96.0	
Two-party-preferred result
Liberal	Milton Morris	12,509	61.0	−9.4
Labor	Francis Murray	7,981	39.0	+9.4
Liberal hold		Swing	−9.4	

=== Manly ===
1971 New South Wales state election: Manly
Party	Candidate	Votes	%	±%
Liberal	Douglas Darby	14,688	59.0	−9.8
Labor	Terence Riley	7,919	31.8	+5.5
Democratic Labor	Francis Bulger	1,830	7.4	+4.2
Independent	Eric Riches	446	1.8	+1.2
Total formal votes		24,883	97.7	
Informal votes		583	2.3	
Turnout		25,466	90.8	
Two-party-preferred result
Liberal	Douglas Darby	16,375	65.8	−6.4
Labor	Terence Riley	8,508	34.2	+6.4
Liberal hold		Swing	−6.4	

=== Maroubra ===
1971 New South Wales state election: Maroubra
Party	Candidate	Votes	%	±%
Labor	Bill Haigh	15,307	59.0	+6.0
Liberal	Gregory Lyons	8,805	33.9	−13.1
Democratic Labor	Warwick Spooner	1,372	5.3	+5.3
Independent	Samuel Joseph	465	1.8	+1.8
Total formal votes		25,949	97.4	
Informal votes		694	2.6	
Turnout		26,643	93.2	
Two-party-preferred result
Labor	Bill Haigh	15,814	60.9	+7.9
Liberal	Gregory Lyons	10,135	39.1	−7.9
Labor hold		Swing	+7.9	

=== Marrickville ===
1971 New South Wales state election: Marrickville
Party	Candidate	Votes	%	±%
Labor	Norm Ryan	15,780	63.5	−0.6
Liberal	Jonathan Fowler	9,060	36.5	+0.6
Total formal votes		24,840	96.3	
Informal votes		949	3.7	
Turnout		25,789	91.2	
Labor hold		Swing	−0.6	

=== Merrylands ===
1971 New South Wales state election: Merrylands
Party	Candidate	Votes	%	±%
Labor	Jack Ferguson	19,002	67.2	+3.9
Liberal	Neville Hodsdon	9,259	32.8	−3.9
Total formal votes		28,261	96.8	
Informal votes		940	3.2	
Turnout		29,201	93.6	
Labor hold		Swing	+3.9	

=== Miranda ===
1971 New South Wales state election: Miranda
Party	Candidate	Votes	%	±%
Liberal	Tim Walker	13,304	46.9	
Labor	Bill Robb	11,574	40.8	
Australia	Milo Dunphy	2,135	7.5	
Democratic Labor	William Goslett	1,331	4.7	
Total formal votes		28,344	98.5	
Informal votes		434	1.5	
Turnout		28,778	95.8	
Two-party-preferred result
Liberal	Tim Walker	14,899	52.6	−0.7
Labor	Bill Robb	13,445	47.4	+0.7
Liberal notional hold		Swing	−0.7	

=== Monaro ===
1971 New South Wales state election: Monaro
Party	Candidate	Votes	%	±%
Liberal	Steve Mauger	9,158	53.2	−1.7
Labor	Alfred Kingston	8,044	46.8	+1.7
Total formal votes		17,202	98.1	
Informal votes		330	1.9	
Turnout		17,532	92.3	
Liberal hold		Swing	−1.7	

=== Mosman ===
1971 New South Wales state election: Mosman
Party	Candidate	Votes	%	±%
Liberal	Pat Morton	16,304	62.7	−10.8
Labor	Darryl Nagel	5,080	19.5	−0.5
Australia	Brian Buckley	2,595	10.0	+10.0
Democratic Labor	Ann Macken	2,034	7.8	+1.3
Total formal votes		26,013	98.3	
Informal votes		454	1.7	
Turnout		26,467	91.4	
Two-party-preferred result
Liberal	Pat Morton	19,099	73.4	−5.3
Labor	Darryl Nagel	6,914	26.6	+5.3
Liberal hold		Swing	−5.3	

=== Mount Druitt ===
1971 New South Wales state election: Mount Druitt
Party	Candidate	Votes	%	±%
Labor	Jim Southee	16,771	65.0	+7.4
Liberal	John Park	9,022	35.0	−7.4
Total formal votes		25,793	95.7	
Informal votes		1,167	4.3	
Turnout		26,960	92.7	
Labor notional hold		Swing	+7.4	

=== Murray ===
1971 New South Wales state election: Murray
Party	Candidate	Votes	%	±%
Independent	Joe Lawson	7,452	46.2	+13.5
Country	Bruce Birrell	5,026	31.2	+14.9
Liberal	Allan Connell	2,299	14.3	+5.5
Democratic Labor	Brian Maw	1,339	8.3	+3.9
Total formal votes		16,116	97.0	
Informal votes		496	3.0	
Turnout		16,612	90.6	
Two-candidate-preferred result
Independent	Joe Lawson	8,335	51.7	−7.8
Country	Bruce Birrell	7,781	48.3	+7.8
Independent hold		Swing	−7.8	

=== Murrumbidgee ===
1971 New South Wales state election: Murrumbidgee
Party	Candidate	Votes	%	±%
Labor	Lin Gordon	9,683	53.7	−9.3
Liberal	Ian Davidge	4,766	26.4	+15.5
Country	David Clark	2,685	14.9	−7.5
Democratic Labor	Leslie Kennedy	889	4.9	+1.2
Two-party-preferred result
Labor	Lin Gordon	10,129	56.2	−8.6
Liberal	Ian Davidge	7,894	43.8	+43.8
Labor hold		Swing	−8.6	

=== Nepean ===
1971 New South Wales state election: Nepean
Party	Candidate	Votes	%	±%
Labor	Ron Mulock	13,068	48.9	+4.1
Liberal	Ron Dunbier	10,416	38.9	−16.3
Independent	John Andersen	1,854	6.9	+6.9
Democratic Labor	Leslie Clarke	1,409	5.3	+5.3
Total formal votes		26,747	97.6	
Informal votes		664	2.4	
Turnout		27,411	93.7	
Two-party-preferred result
Labor	Ron Mulock	13,793	51.6	+6.8
Liberal	Ron Dunbier	12,954	48.4	−6.8
Labor gain from Liberal		Swing	+6.8	

=== Newcastle ===
1971 New South Wales state election: Newcastle
Party	Candidate	Votes	%	±%
Labor	Arthur Wade	14,892	58.8	+11.2
Liberal	Malcolm Barnes	8,883	35.1	+7.5
Australia	Wlodzimierz Bohatko	795	3.1	+3.1
Democratic Labor	Gerard Collins	769	3.0	+3.0
Total formal votes		25,339	98.3	
Informal votes		450	1.7	
Turnout		25,789	93.6	
Two-party-preferred result
Labor	Arthur Wade	15,523	61.3	+7.0
Liberal	Malcolm Barnes	9,816	38.7	−7.0
Labor hold		Swing	+7.0	

=== Northcott ===
1971 New South Wales state election: Northcott
Party	Candidate	Votes	%	±%
Liberal	Jim Cameron	17,553	67.1	−9.0
Australia	David Haig	5,544	21.2	+21.2
Defence of Government Schools	Jane Gray	3,048	11.7	+11.7
Total formal votes		26,145	97.3	
Informal votes		711	2.7	
Turnout		26,856	93.0	
Two-candidate-preferred result
Liberal	Jim Cameron	19,077	73.0	−7.0
Australia	David Haig	7,068	27.0	+7.0
Liberal hold		Swing	−7.0	

=== Orange ===
1971 New South Wales state election: Orange
Party	Candidate	Votes	%	±%
Country	Charles Cutler	10,493	53.4	−3.0
Labor	Joseph Ryan	6,346	32.3	−11.3
Democratic Labor	John Grant	1,147	5.8	+5.8
Independent	Lloyd Stapleton	940	4.8	+4.8
Independent	Margaret Stevenson	714	3.6	+3.6
Total formal votes		19,640	98.3	
Informal votes		331	1.7	
Turnout		19,971	95.6	
Two-party-preferred result
Country	Charles Cutler	12,073	61.5	+5.1
Labor	Joseph Ryan	7,567	38.5	−5.1
Country hold		Swing	+5.1	

=== Oxley ===
1971 New South Wales state election: Oxley
Party	Candidate	Votes	%	±%
Country	Bruce Cowan	14,539	76.8	−3.7
Independent	Joe Cordner	4,396	23.2	+3.7
Total formal votes		18,935	97.6	
Informal votes		466	2.4	
Turnout		19,401	94.8	
Country hold		Swing	−3.7	

=== Parramatta ===
1971 New South Wales state election: Parramatta
Party	Candidate	Votes	%	±%
Labor	Dan Mahoney	16,691	57.2	+4.8
Liberal	Alaric Kellett	11,621	39.8	−0.3
Independent	Leonard Kiernan	891	3.0	+3.0
Total formal votes		29,203	98.3	
Informal votes		507	1.7	
Turnout		29,710	93.7	
Two-party-preferred result
Labor	Dan Mahoney	17,137	58.7	+3.2
Liberal	Alaric Kellett	12,066	41.3	−3.2
Labor hold		Swing	+3.2	

=== Phillip ===
1971 New South Wales state election: Phillip
Party	Candidate	Votes	%	±%
Labor	Pat Hills	16,904	72.1	+3.3
Liberal	Ronald Hack	4,567	19.5	−3.9
Democratic Labor	John Fox	1,974	8.4	+0.6
Total formal votes		23,445	96.0	
Informal votes		973	4.0	
Turnout		24,418	88.0	
Two-party-preferred result
Labor	Pat Hills	17,299	73.8	+3.4
Liberal	Ronald Hack	6,146	26.2	−3.4
Labor hold		Swing	+3.4	

=== Raleigh ===
1971 New South Wales state election: Raleigh
Party	Candidate	Votes	%	±%
Country	Jim Brown	11,423	60.4	+4.4
Labor	Sydney Dodds	5,830	30.8	+2.6
Independent	Andrew Boyton	1,648	8.7	+8.7
Total formal votes		18,901	99.0	
Informal votes		197	1.0	
Turnout		19,098	95.6	
Two-party-preferred result
Country	Jim Brown	12,377	65.5	−2.4
Labor	Sydney Dodds	6,524	34.5	+2.4
Country hold		Swing	−2.4	

=== Rockdale ===
1971 New South Wales state election: Rockdale
Party	Candidate	Votes	%	±%
Labor	Brian Bannon	14,983	57.3	+2.2
Liberal	Roye Gaha	9,681	37.0	+4.5
Democratic Labor	Mary Hennessy	1,053	4.0	+0.5
Independent	Edwin Bellchambers	424	1.6	+1.6
Total formal votes		26,141	97.5	
Informal votes		677	2.5	
Turnout		26,818	93.7	
Two-party-preferred result
Labor	Brian Bannon	15,406	58.9	+3.2
Liberal	Roye Gaha	10,735	41.1	−3.2
Labor hold		Swing	+3.2	

=== South Coast ===
1971 New South Wales state election: South Coast
Party	Candidate	Votes	%	±%
Liberal	Jack Beale	9,633	50.9	−6.4
Independent	John Hatton	9,293	49.1	+6.4
Total formal votes		18,926	98.1	
Informal votes		362	1.9	
Turnout		19,288	94.7	
Liberal hold		Swing	−6.4	

=== Sturt ===
1971 New South Wales state election: Sturt
Party	Candidate	Votes	%	±%
Country	Tim Fischer	6,657	39.5	
Independent	Ernest Mitchell	5,484	32.5	
Liberal	William Dixon	3,226	19.1	
Democratic Labor	Bernard O'Keeffe	1,488	8.8	
Total formal votes		16,855	98.5	
Informal votes		262	1.5	
Turnout		17,117	93.9	
Two-candidate-preferred result
Country	Tim Fischer	10,838	64.3	
Independent	Ernest Mitchell	6,017	35.7	
Country notional hold		Swing	N/A	

=== Tamworth ===
1971 New South Wales state election: Tamworth
Party	Candidate	Votes	%	±%
Country	Bill Chaffey	8,661	42.8	−12.9
Labor	Francis Briscoe-Hough	7,070	35.0	+35.0
Independent	Alexander Dickinson	1,758	8.7	+8.7
Independent	Ellis Wall	1,736	8.6	+8.6
Democratic Labor	Ian de Courcy Dutton	1,002	5.0	+5.0
Total formal votes		20,227	98.6	
Informal votes		295	1.4	
Turnout		20,522	95.0	
Two-party-preferred result
Country	Bill Chaffey	11,750	58.1	
Labor	Francis Briscoe-Hough	8,477	41.9	
Country hold		Swing	N/A	

=== Temora ===
1971 New South Wales state election: Temora
Party	Candidate	Votes	%	±%
Country	Jim Taylor	8,478	51.5	−14.5
Labor	Lyle Hoad	6,165	37.4	+13.5
Independent	Terence Brady	1,824	11.1	+11.1
Total formal votes		16,467	98.6	
Informal votes		238	1.4	
Turnout		16,705	93.7	
Two-party-preferred result
Country	Jim Taylor	9,390	57.0	−16.3
Labor	Lyle Hoad	7,077	43.0	+16.3
Country hold		Swing	−16.3	

=== Tenterfield ===
1971 New South Wales state election: Tenterfield
Party	Candidate	Votes	%	±%
Country	Tim Bruxner	9,683	56.5	−10.4
Labor	Ronald Grafton	6,706	39.2	+6.1
Independent	George Britz	736	4.3	+4.3
Total formal votes		17,125	99.0	
Informal votes		169	1.0	
Turnout		17,294	93.3	
Two-party-preferred result
Country	Tim Bruxner	10,051	58.7	−8.2
Labor	Ronald Grafton	7,074	41.3	+8.2
Country hold		Swing	−8.2	

=== The Hills ===
1971 New South Wales state election: The Hills
Party	Candidate	Votes	%	±%
Liberal	Max Ruddock	18,978	60.4	−3.8
Labor	Michael Gillian	10,025	31.9	+9.7
Democratic Labor	John Stewart	2,391	7.6	+3.0
Total formal votes		31,394	98.4	
Informal votes		513	1.6	
Turnout		31,907	94.1	
Two-party-preferred result
Liberal	Max Ruddock	20,891	66.5	−5.9
Labor	Michael Gillian	10,503	33.5	+5.9
Liberal hold		Swing	−5.9	

=== Upper Hunter ===
1971 New South Wales state election: Upper Hunter
Party	Candidate	Votes	%	±%
Country	Col Fisher	9,631	48.1	−17.1
Labor	Kenneth Cosgrove	5,922	29.6	−4.9
Labor	Alexander Trevallion	4,474	22.3	+22.3
Total formal votes		20,027	98.8	
Informal votes		248	1.2	
Turnout		20,275	94.5	
Two-party-preferred result
Country	Col Fisher	10,347	51.7	−13.8
Labor	Alexander Trevallion	9,680	48.3	+13.8
Country hold		Swing	−13.8	

=== Vaucluse ===
1971 New South Wales state election: Vaucluse
Party	Candidate	Votes	%	±%
Liberal	Keith Doyle	16,099	64.2	−7.1
Independent	Lincoln Oppenheimer	6,794	27.1	+27.1
Independent	Harry Marsh	2,190	8.7	+8.7
Total formal votes		25,083	94.6	
Informal votes		1,433	5.4	
Turnout		26,516	90.2	
Two-candidate-preferred result
Liberal	Keith Doyle	17,194	68.5	−8.5
Independent	Lincoln Oppenheimer	7,889	31.5	+31.5
Liberal hold		Swing	−8.5	

=== Wagga Wagga ===
1971 New South Wales state election: Wagga Wagga
Party	Candidate	Votes	%	±%
Liberal	Wal Fife	11,844	60.9	−7.3
Labor	John Skeers	5,889	30.3	+4.7
Democratic Labor	Peter Piltz	1,718	8.8	+2.6
Total formal votes		19,451	98.7	
Informal votes		259	1.3	
Turnout		19,710	92.9	
Two-party-preferred result
Liberal	Wal Fife	13,218	68.0	−5.2
Labor	John Skeers	6,233	32.0	+5.2
Liberal hold		Swing	−5.2	

=== Wakehurst ===
1971 New South Wales state election: Wakehurst
Party	Candidate	Votes	%	±%
Liberal	Allan Viney	15,074	52.3	−7.3
Labor	Evan Davies	11,706	40.6	+7.5
Democratic Labor	Kevin Lee	2,038	7.1	−0.2
Total formal votes		28,818	97.7	
Informal votes		664	2.3	
Turnout		29,482	93.0	
Two-party-preferred result
Liberal	Allan Viney	16,704	58.0	−7.5
Labor	Evan Davies	12,114	42.0	+7.5
Liberal hold		Swing	−7.5	

=== Wallsend ===
1971 New South Wales state election: Wallsend
Party	Candidate	Votes	%	±%
Labor	Ken Booth	18,981	68.7	−2.1
Liberal	John Bailey	7,691	27.8	+2.0
Democratic Labor	Robert Godfrey	978	3.5	+0.1
Total formal votes		27,650	98.0	
Informal votes		558	2.0	
Turnout		28,208	95.7	
Two-party-preferred result
Labor	Ken Booth	19,177	69.4	−2.1
Liberal	John Bailey	8,473	30.6	+2.1
Labor hold		Swing	−2.1	

=== Waratah ===
1971 New South Wales state election: Waratah
Party	Candidate	Votes	%	±%
Labor	Sam Jones	18,687	68.6	+10.7
Liberal	Malcolm Blackshaw	8,547	31.4	+31.4
Total formal votes		27,234	98.4	
Informal votes		455	1.6	
Turnout		27,689	94.9	
Labor hold		Swing	+10.7	

=== Waverley ===
1971 New South Wales state election: Waverley
Party	Candidate	Votes	%	±%
Labor	Syd Einfeld	13,781	58.6	+5.5
Liberal	James Markham	9,736	41.4	−5.5
Total formal votes		23,517	96.8	
Informal votes		770	3.2	
Turnout		24,287	89.6	
Labor notional hold		Swing	+5.5	

=== Wentworthville ===
1971 New South Wales state election: Wentworthville
Party	Candidate	Votes	%	±%
Labor	Ernie Quinn	15,697	60.8	+4.3
Liberal	Peter Andrews	10,122	39.2	+0.3
Total formal votes		25,819	97.8	
Informal votes		588	2.2	
Turnout		26,407	94.1	
Labor hold		Swing	+3.5	

=== Willoughby ===
1971 New South Wales state election: Willoughby
Party	Candidate	Votes	%	±%
Liberal	Laurie McGinty	14,180	56.6	−9.1
Labor	Eddie Britt	7,023	28.1	−1.0
Australia	Mary McNish	2,048	8.2	+8.2
Independent	Ida Carter	893	3.6	+3.6
Democratic Labor	Leo Eller	893	3.6	−1.6
Total formal votes		25,037	97.6	
Informal votes		625	2.4	
Turnout		25,662	91.9	
Two-party-preferred result
Liberal	Laurie McGinty	16,159	64.5	−5.4
Labor	Eddie Britt	8,878	35.5	+5.4
Liberal hold		Swing	−5.4	

=== Wollondilly ===
1971 New South Wales state election: Wollondilly
Party	Candidate	Votes	%	±%
Liberal	Tom Lewis	11,538	55.7	−9.3
Labor	John Kerin	7,506	36.2	+1.2
Democratic Labor	Kevin Harrold	858	4.1	+4.1
Independent	Alexander Gould	814	3.9	+3.9
Total formal votes		20,716	98.5	
Informal votes		323	1.5	
Turnout		21,039	94.3	
Two-party-preferred result
Liberal	Tom Lewis	12,631	61.0	−4.0
Labor	John Kerin	8,085	39.0	+4.0
Liberal hold		Swing	−4.0	

=== Wollongong ===
1971 New South Wales state election: Wollongong
Party	Candidate	Votes	%	±%
Labor	Eric Ramsay	13,347	48.9	
Liberal	Jack Hough	11,621	42.5	
Democratic Labor	Peter Daly	2,351	8.6	
Total formal votes		27,319	97.3	
Informal votes		748	2.7	
Turnout		28,067	94.6	
Two-party-preferred result
Labor	Eric Ramsay	13,699	50.1	+0.6
Liberal	Jack Hough	13,620	49.9	−0.6
Labor gain from Liberal		Swing	+0.6	

=== Wyong ===
1971 New South Wales state election: Wyong
Party	Candidate	Votes	%	±%
Labor	Harry Jensen	18,084	62.5	+6.9
Liberal	Geoffrey Gilchrist	9,574	33.1	−8.4
Democratic Labor	Estelle Drinkwater	1,275	4.4	+1.5
Total formal votes		28,933	98.7	
Informal votes		380	1.3	
Turnout		29,313	94.3	
Two-party-preferred result
Labor	Harry Jensen	18,339	63.4	+6.8
Liberal	Geoffrey Gilchrist	10,594	36.6	−6.8
Labor hold		Swing	+6.8	

=== Yaralla ===
1971 New South Wales state election: Yaralla
Party	Candidate	Votes	%	±%
Liberal	Lerryn Mutton	13,295	49.8	−1.8
Labor	Garry McIlwaine	11,500	43.1	+0.4
Democratic Labor	Andrew Murphy	1,889	7.1	+1.4
Total formal votes		26,684	98.1	
Informal votes		511	1.9	
Turnout		27,195	93.0	
Two-party-preferred result
Liberal	Lerryn Mutton	14,661	54.9	−2.3
Labor	Garry McIlwaine	12,023	45.1	+2.3
Liberal hold		Swing	−2.3	

=== Young ===
1971 New South Wales state election: Young
Party	Candidate	Votes	%	±%
Country	George Freudenstein	9,192	48.4	−10.9
Labor	Jeffrey Condron	8,527	44.9	+9.6
Democratic Labor	John Hogan	1,266	6.7	+1.2
Total formal votes		18,985	98.9	
Informal votes		210	1.1	
Turnout		19,195	95.8	
Two-party-preferred result
Country	George Freudenstein	10,210	53.8	−9.8
Labor	Jeffrey Condron	8,775	46.2	+9.8
Country hold		Swing	−9.8	

== See also ==
- Candidates of the 1971 New South Wales state election
- Members of the New South Wales Legislative Assembly, 1971–1973
