= Members of the New South Wales Legislative Assembly, 1971–1973 =

Members of the New South Wales Legislative Assembly who served in the 43rd parliament held their seats from 1971 to 1973. They were elected at the 1971 state election, and at by-elections. The Speaker was Sir Kevin Ellis.

Name	Party	Electorate	Term in office
David Arblaster (Note: Mosman Liberal MLA Pat Morton resigned on 16 June 1972. Liberal candidate David Arblaster won the resulting by-election on 29 July.)	Liberal	Mosman	1972–1984
Sir Robert Askin	Liberal	Collaroy	1950–1975
Brian Bannon	Labor	Rockdale	1959–1986
Gordon Barnier	Labor	Blacktown	1971–1981
John Barraclough	Liberal	Bligh	1968–1981
Jack Beale (Note: South Coast Liberal MLA Jack Beale resigned on 19 October 1973. No by-election was held due to the proximity of the 1973 state election.)	Liberal	South Coast	1942–1973
Eric Bedford	Labor	Fairfield	1968–1985
Ken Booth	Labor	Wallsend	1960–1988
Jack Boyd (Note: Byron Country Party MLA Stanley Stephens resigned on 17 January 1973. Country Party candidate Jack Boyd won the resulting by-election on 17 February 1973.)	Country	Byron	1973–1984
Ron Brewer	Country	Goulburn	1965–1984
Jim Brown	Country	Raleigh	1959–1984
Tim Bruxner	Country	Tenterfield	1962–1981
Tom Cahill	Labor	Cook's River	1959–1983
Jim Cameron	Liberal	Northcott	1968–1984
Bill Chaffey (Note: Tamworth MLA Bill Chaffey was elected as a Country Party member, but resigned from the party during 1972. He served out his term as an independent.)	Country/Independent	Tamworth	1940–1973
Jim Clough	Liberal	Eastwood	1956–1988
Reg Coady	Labor	Drummoyne	1954–1973
Harold Coates	Independent	Blue Mountains	1965–1976
Peter Coleman	Liberal	Fuller	1968–1978
Bruce Cowan	Country	Oxley	1965–1980
Peter Cox	Labor	Auburn	1965–1988
Bill Crabtree	Labor	Kogarah	1953–1983
Geoff Crawford	Country	Barwon	1950–1976
Sir Charles Cutler	Country	Orange	1947–1975
Douglas Darby	Liberal	Manly	1945–1978
Don Day	Labor	Casino	1971–1984
Bernie Deane (Note: Hawkesbury Liberal MLA Bernie Deane resigned on 24 October 1972. Liberal candidate Kevin Rozzoli won the resulting by-election on 17 February 1973.)	Liberal	Hawkesbury	1950–1972
Roger Degen	Labor	Balmain	1968–1984
Keith Doyle	Liberal	Vaucluse	1965–1978
Bruce Duncan	Country	Lismore	1965–1988
Vince Durick	Labor	Lakemba	1964–1984
Clarrie Earl	Labor	Bass Hill	1953–1973
Syd Einfeld	Labor	Waverley	1965–1981
Sir Kevin Ellis	Liberal	Coogee	1948–1953, 1956–1962, 1965–1973
Richard Face (Note: Charlestown Labor MLA Jack Stewart died on 19 September 1972. Labor candidate Richard Face won the resulting by-election on 18 November.)	Labor	Charlestown	1972–2003
Jack Ferguson	Labor	Merrylands	1959–1984
Wal Fife	Liberal	Wagga Wagga	1957–1975
Tim Fischer	Country	Sturt	1971–1980, 1980–1984
Col Fisher	Country	Upper Hunter	1970–1988
Pat Flaherty	Labor	Granville	1962–1984
Lin Gordon	Labor	Murrumbidgee	1970–1984
Ian Griffith	Liberal	Cronulla	1956–1978
Bill Haigh	Labor	Maroubra	1968–1983
George Freudenstein	Country	Young	1959–1981
Dick Healey	Liberal	Davidson	1962–1981
Pat Hills	Labor	Phillip	1954–1988
Davis Hughes (Note: Armidale Country Party MLA Davis Hughes resigned on 17 January 1973. Country Party candidate Dr David Leitch won the resulting by-election on 17 February 1973.)	Country	Armidale	1950–1953, 1956–1973
David Hunter	Liberal	Ashfield	1940–1976
Merv Hunter	Labor	Lake Macquarie	1969–1991
John Jackett	Liberal	Burwood	1965–1978
Rex Jackson	Labor	Heathcote	1955–1986
Harry Jago	Liberal	Gordon	1962–1973
Harry Jensen	Labor	Wyong	1965–1981
Lew Johnstone	Labor	Broken Hill	1965–1981
Sam Jones	Labor	Waratah	1965–1984
Nick Kearns	Labor	Bankstown	1962–1980
Laurie Kelly	Labor	Corrimal	1968–1988
Joe Kelly	Labor	East Hills	1956–1973
Joe Lawson (Note: Murray independent MLA Joe Lawson, a former Country Party member, died on 14 August 1973. His daughter, Mary Meillon, contested and won the resulting by-election for the Liberal Party on 6 October.)	Independent	Murray	1932–1973
David Leitch	Country	Armidale	1973–1978
Tom Lewis	Liberal	Wollondilly	1957–1978
Gordon Mackie	Liberal	Albury	1965–1978
Dan Mahoney	Labor	Parramatta	1959–1976
John Maddison	Liberal	Hornsby	1962–1980
Cliff Mallam	Labor	Campbelltown	1953–1968, 1971–1981
John Mason	Liberal	Dubbo	1965–1981
Steve Mauger	Liberal	Monaro	1965–1976
Ken McCaw	Liberal	Lane Cove	1947–1975
Laurie McGinty	Liberal	Willoughby	1968–1978
Tom Mead	Liberal	Hurstville	1965–1976
Mary Meillon	Liberal	Murray	1973–1980
Milton Morris	Liberal	Maitland	1956–1980
Pat Morton	Liberal	Mosman	1947–1972
Ron Mulock	Labor	Nepean	1971–1988
Lerryn Mutton	Liberal	Yaralla	1968–1978
George Neilly	Labor	Cessnock	1959–1978
Leo Nott	Labor	Burrendong	1953–1968, 1971–1973
Keith O'Connell	Labor	Gosford	1971–1984
Clive Osborne	Country	Bathurst	1967–1981
George Paciullo	Labor	Liverpool	1971–1989
George Petersen	Labor	Illawarra	1968–1988
Leon Punch	Country	Gloucester	1959–1985
Ernie Quinn	Labor	Wentworthville	1962–1988
Eric Ramsay	Labor	Wollongong	1971–1984
Jack Renshaw	Labor	Castlereagh	1941–1980
Kevin Rozzoli	Liberal	Hawkesbury	1973–2003
Max Ruddock	Liberal	The Hills	1962–1976
Norm Ryan	Labor	Marrickville	1953–1973
Matt Singleton	Country	Clarence	1971–1990
Bill Sheahan	Labor	Burrinjuck	1941–1973
Albert Sloss	Labor	King	1956–1973
Jim Southee	Labor	Mount Druitt	1962–1973
Stanley Stephens	Country	Byron	1944–1973
Jack Stewart	Labor	Charlestown	1957–1972
Kevin Stewart	Labor	Canterbury	1962–1985
Jim Taylor	Country	Temora	1960–1981
Allan Viney	Liberal	Wakehurst	1971–1978
Arthur Wade	Labor	Newcastle	1968–1988
John Waddy	Liberal	Kirribilli	1962–1976
Frank Walker	Labor	Georges River	1970–1988
Tim Walker	Liberal	Miranda	1968–1978
Eric Willis	Liberal	Earlwood	1950–1978

== See also ==
- Fourth Askin ministry
- Fifth Askin ministry
- Results of the 1971 New South Wales state election (Legislative Assembly)
- Candidates of the 1971 New South Wales state election
