= Candidates of the 1971 New South Wales state election =

This is a list of candidates for the 1971 New South Wales state election. The election was held on 13 February 1971.

== Retiring Members ==
=== Labor ===
- Laurie Brereton MLA (Randwick)
- Jack Mannix MLA (Liverpool)
- Robert McCartney MLA (Hamilton)

=== Country ===
- Bill Weiley MLA (Clarence)

== Legislative Assembly ==
Sitting members are shown in bold text. Successful candidates are highlighted in the relevant colour. Where there is possible confusion, an asterisk (*) is also used.

Electorate	Held by	Labor candidate	Coalition candidate	DLP candidate	Other candidates
Albury	Liberal	Kevin Esler	**Gordon Mackie** (Lib)	Anthony Quinn	
Armidale	Country		**Davis Hughes** (CP)		Jean Mitchell (Ind)
Ashfield	Liberal	Bede Spillane	**David Hunter** (Lib)	Joseph Conroy	David Eden (AP)
Auburn	Labor	**Peter Cox**	William McIntyre (Lib)		
Balmain	Labor	**Roger Degen**	Robert Ward (Lib)		
Bankstown	Labor	**Nick Kearns**	John Ghent (Lib)		
Barwon	Country	Peter Prentice	**Geoff Crawford** (CP)		David Aiken (Ind); Thomas Broadbent (AP); Wallace Ridley (Ind)
Bass Hill	Labor	**Clarrie Earl**	Doreen Ghent (Lib)		
Bathurst	Country	Michael Connolly	**Clive Osborne** (CP)		Deryck Barnes (AP)
Blacktown	Labor	Gordon Barnier	Hilton Robinson (Lib)	Charles Ormel	George Nicolaidis (Ind)
Bligh	Liberal	Maurice Allen	**John Barraclough** (Lib)	Dominique Droulers	Francis Claffy (Ind); Merilyn Giesekam (Ind); Bridget Gilling (ALRA); Thomas Smith (Ind)
Blue Mountains	Independent	James Collins		Kenneth Brown	**Harold Coates*** (Ind); Frederick Lamb (Ind)
Broken Hill	Labor	**Lew Johnstone**			
Burrendong	Country	Leo Nott	**Roger Wotton** (CP)		
Burrinjuck	Labor	**Bill Sheahan**	Leon Garry (Lib); Edward O'Connor (CP)		
Burwood	Liberal	Phil O'Neill	**John Jackett** (Lib)		Ben Doig (Ind); Jack Mundey (CPA)
Byron	Country	James Constable	**Stanley Stephens** (CP)		
Campbelltown	Liberal	Cliff Mallam	**Max Dunbier** (Lib)		
Canterbury	Labor	**Kevin Stewart**	Jack Backer (Lib)		
Casino	Country	Don Day	Charles Yabsley (CP)		
Castlereagh	Labor	**Jack Renshaw**	Bruce Fry (Lib); Albert Green (CP)	John Gough	
Cessnock	Labor	**George Neilly**	John Thomas (Lib)		
Charlestown	Labor	**Jack Stewart**	Alfred Pickering (Lib)	Hugh Ansell	Charles Hockings (AP)
Clarence	Country	Thomas Cronin	Francis Clark (CP); Matt Singleton* (CP)		Clarice McClymont (Ind); Neville Weiley (Ind)
Collaroy	Liberal		**Robert Askin** (Lib)	Lyle Antcliff	Frederick Adcock (Ind); Brian Walker (AP); Norman Ward (Ind)
Coogee	Liberal	Mary Barry	**Sir Kevin Ellis** (Lib)	Betty Stepkovitch	William Ash (Ind); Jean McCoroskin (DOGS)
Cook's River	Labor	**Tom Cahill**	Kenneth McKimm (Lib)		
Corrimal	Labor	**Laurie Kelly**	Eric Blain (Lib)	Raymond Proust	Reginald Wilding (CPA)
Cronulla	Liberal	Michael Egan	**Ian Griffith** (Lib)		Robin Alleway (DOGS)
Davidson	Liberal		**Dick Healey** (Lib)	Thomas Colman	
Drummoyne	Labor	**Reg Coady**	Colin Gardiner (Lib)		
Dubbo	Liberal	Norman Cox	**John Mason** (Lib)	Terence Catley	
Earlwood	Liberal	Barry Robinson	**Eric Willis** (Lib)		
East Hills	Labor	**Joe Kelly**	Albert Hurley (Lib)		Raymond Buchanan (Ind); Harold McIlveen (Ind)
Eastwood	Liberal	John McMahon	**Jim Clough** (Lib)		Olwyn Mackenzie (Ind)
Fairfield	Labor	**Eric Bedford**	John Woods (Lib)		Edward Oldfield (Ind)
Fuller	Liberal	Anthony Bellanto	**Peter Coleman** (Lib)	Kevin Davis	Dudley Abbott (DOGS)
Georges River	Labor	**Frank Walker**	Vince Bruce (Lib)		
Gloucester	Country	Terence Wallis	**Leon Punch** (CP)		James Bogan (Ind)
Gordon	Liberal		**Harry Jago** (Lib)	Allan Dwyer	
Gosford	Liberal	Keith O'Connell	**Ted Humphries** (Lib)		Wallace Cook (Ind); Barry Phillips (AP)
Goulburn	Country	Norman Barnwell	**Ron Brewer** (CP)		
Granville	Labor	**Pat Flaherty**	George Ajaka (Lib)		
Hawkesbury	Liberal	Walter Brown	**Bernie Deane**(Lib)		Charles Rogers (Ind)
Heathcote	Labor	**Rex Jackson**	Evelyn Thompson (Lib)		Edna McGill (DOGS)
Hornsby	Liberal		**John Maddison** (Lib)	Anthony Felton	George Black (AP); David Hill (Ind)
Hurstville	Liberal	Kenneth Hallen	**Tom Mead** (Lib)	Peter Abrams	Ralph Catts (AP); Judith Sainsbury (DOGS)
Illawarra	Labor	**George Petersen**	Lorna Shacklock (Lib)	Edward Himmelreich	Frank Arkell (Ind); Raymond Clay (Ind)
King	Labor	**Albert Sloss**	Andrew Bush (Lib)		Doris Jobling (CPA); Ernest Williams (Ind)
Kirribilli	Liberal	William Harkness	**John Waddy** (Lib)	Michael Fitzpatrick	Romualds Kemps (Ind)
Kogarah	Labor	**Bill Crabtree**	William Marshall (Lib)		Margot Caulfield (Ind)
Lake Macquarie	Labor	**Merv Hunter**	Richard Bevan (Lib)		
Lakemba	Labor	**Vince Durick**	James Dixon (Lib)		
Lane Cove	Liberal	Ronald Gornall	**Ken McCaw** (Lib)	Reginald Lawson	Malcolm Hilbery (AP)
Lismore	Country		**Bruce Duncan** (CP)		
Liverpool	Labor	George Paciullo	Robert Leech (Lib)	William Arundell	
Maitland	Liberal	Francis Murray	**Milton Morris** (Lib)	Jack Collins	
Manly	Liberal	Terence Riley	**Douglas Darby** (Lib)	Francis Bulger	Eric Riches (Ind)
Maroubra	Labor	**Bill Haigh**	Gregory Lyons (Lib)	Warwick Spooner	Samuel Joseph (Ind)
Marrickville	Labor	**Norm Ryan**	Jonathan Fowler (Lib)		
Merrylands	Labor	**Jack Ferguson**	Nevile Hodsdon (Lib)		
Miranda	Liberal	Bill Robb	**Tim Walker** (Lib)	William Goslett	Milo Dunphy (AP)
Monaro	Liberal	Alfred Kingston	**Steve Mauger** (Lib)		
Mosman	Liberal	Darryl Nagel	**Pat Morton** (Lib)	Ann Macken	Brian Buckley (AP)
Mount Druitt	Labor	**Jim Southee**	John Park (Lib)		
Murray	Independent		Bruce Birrell (CP); Allan Connell (Lib)	Brian Maw	**Joe Lawson** (Ind)
Murrumbidgee	Labor	**Lin Gordon**	David Clark (CP); Ian Davidge (Lib)	Leslie Kennedy	
Nepean	Liberal	Ron Mulock	**Ron Dunbier** (Lib)	Leslie Clarke	John Andersen (Ind)
Newcastle	Labor	**Arthur Wade**	Malcolm Barnes (Lib)	Gerard Collins	Wlodzimierz Bohatko (AP)
Northcott	Liberal		**Jim Cameron** (Lib)		Jane Gray (DOGS); David Haig (AP)
Orange	Country	Joseph Ryan	**Charles Cutler** (CP)	John Grant	Lloyd Stapleton (Ind); Margaret Stevenson (Ind)
Oxley	Country		**Bruce Cowan** (CP)		Joe Cordner (Ind)
Parramatta	Labor	**Dan Mahoney**	Alaric Kellett (Lib)		Leonard Kiernan (Ind)
Phillip	Labor	**Pat Hills**	Ronald Hack (Lib)	John Fox	
Raleigh	Country	Sydney Dodds	**Jim Brown** (CP)		Andrew Boyton (Ind)
Rockdale	Labor	**Brian Bannon**	Roye Gaha (Lib)	Mary Hennessy	Edwin Bellchambers (Ind)
South Coast	Liberal		**Jack Beale** (Lib)		John Hatton (Ind)
Sturt	Country		William Dixon (Lib); Tim Fischer* (CP)	Bernard O'Keeffe	Ernest Mitchell (Ind)
Tamworth	Country	Francis Briscoe-Hough	**Bill Chaffey** (CP)	Ian de Courcy Dutton	Alexander Dickinson (Ind); Ellis Wall (Ind)
Temora	Country	Lyle Hoad	**Jim Taylor** (CP)		Terence Brady (Ind)
Tenterfield	Country	Ronald Grafton	**Tim Bruxner** (CP)		George Britz (Ind)
The Hills	Liberal	Michael Gillian	**Max Ruddock** (Lib)	John Stewart	
Upper Hunter	Country	Kenneth Cosgrove; Alexander Trevallian	**Col Fisher** (CP)		
Vaucluse	Liberal		**Keith Doyle** (Lib)		Harry Marsh (Ind); Lincoln Oppenheimer (Ind)
Wagga Wagga	Liberal	John Skeers	**Wal Fife** (Lib)	Peter Piltz	
Wakehurst	Liberal	Evan Davies	Allan Viney (Lib)	Kevin Lee	
Wallsend	Labor	**Ken Booth**	John Bailey (Lib)	Robert Godfrey	
Waratah	Labor	**Sam Jones**	Malcolm Blackshaw (Lib)		
Waverley	Labor	**Syd Einfeld**	James Markham (Lib)		
Wentworthville	Labor	**Ernie Quinn**	Peter Andrews (Lib)		
Willoughby	Liberal	Eddie Britt	**Laurie McGinty** (Lib)	Leo Eller	Ida Carter (Ind); Mary McNish (AP)
Wollondilly	Liberal	John Kerin	**Tom Lewis** (Lib)	Kevin Harrold	Alexander Gould (Ind)
Wollongong	Liberal	Eric Ramsay	**Jack Hough** (Lib)	Peter Daly	
Wyong	Labor	**Harry Jensen**	Geoffrey Gilchrist (Lib)	Estelle Drinkwater	
Yaralla	Liberal	Garry McIlwaine	**Lerryn Mutton** (Lib)	Andrew Murphy	
Young	Country	Jeffrey Condron	**George Freudenstein** (CP)	John Hogan	

== See also ==
- Members of the New South Wales Legislative Assembly, 1971–1973
