= 1973 Armidale state by-election =

Election result for Armidale, New South Wales, Australia

A by-election was held for the New South Wales Legislative Assembly electorate of Armidale on 17 February 1973 because of the resignation of Davis Hughes (Country) who had accepted the position of Agent-General in London.

== Dates ==
Date	Event
17 January 1973	Davis Hughes resigned.
19 January 1973	Writ of election issued by the Speaker of the Legislative Assembly.
26 January 1973	Nominations
17 February 1973	Polling day
16 March 1973	Return of writ

== Result ==
1973 Armidale by-election Saturday 17 February
Party	Candidate	Votes	%	±%
Country	David Leitch	5,826	31.4	−30.5
Labor	Justin Rowe	8,282	44.7	
Country	Philip Street	3,738	20.2	
Australia	Joan Kersey	682	3.7	
Total formal votes		18,528	98.7	+0.3
Informal votes		253	1.4	−0.3
Turnout		18,781	88.9	−4.3
Two-party-preferred result
Country	David Leitch	9,612	51.9	−10.0
Labor	Justin Rowe	8,916	48.1	
Country hold		Swing	−10.0 (Note: compared to the two-candidate-preferred vote at the 1971 Armidale election.)	

== See also ==
- Electoral results for the district of Armidale
- List of New South Wales state by-elections
