= 1915 Armidale state by-election =

- 16 December 1911

Electoral district of Armidale in the New South Wales Legislative Assembly
- Registered: 9,840 (Note: Estimate based on a roll of 9,840 at the 1910 election.)
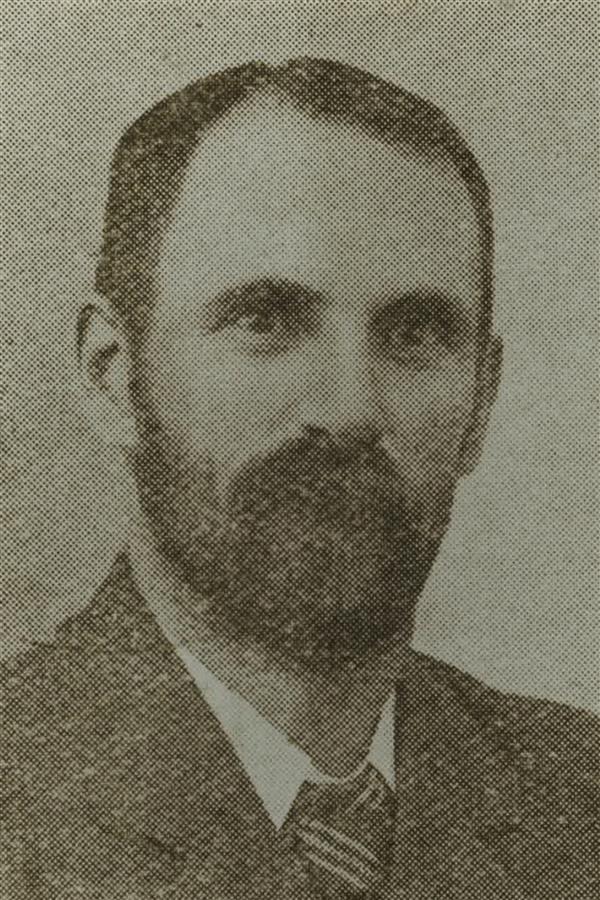
	First party
Candidate	Herbert Lane
Party	Liberal Reform
Popular vote	Unopposed
MP before election
George Braund
Liberal Reform
Elected MP
Herbert Lane
Liberal Reform

The 1915 Armidale state by-election was scheduled to be held on 18 September 1915 to elect the member for Armidale in the New South Wales Legislative Assembly, following the death of Liberal Reform MP George Braund, who was killed in action at Gallipoli.

Liberal Reform leader Charles Wade proposed endorsing George Beeby as a joint Liberal Reform and Farmers and Settlers Association candidate. However, this was opposed by local party delegates, and Armidale mayor Herbert Lane was endorsed instead.

Lane was the only candidate for the by-election, and was declared elected at the close of nominations on 2 December 1911.

== Key dates ==
- 4 May 1915 – George Braund killed in action
- 19 November 1915 – Writ of election issued by the Speaker of the Legislative Assembly
- 2 September 1915 – Candidate nominations
- 18 September 1915 – Polling day (scheduled date)
- 30 September 1915 – Return of writ (scheduled date)

== Result ==
1915 Armidale by-election
Party	Candidate	Votes	%	±%
Liberal Reform	Herbert Lane	unopposed		
Registered electors		7,806		
Liberal Reform hold				

== See also ==
- Electoral results for the district of Armidale
- List of New South Wales state by-elections
