= 1950 Armidale state by-election =

Election result for Armidale, New South Wales, Australia

A by-election was held for the New South Wales Legislative Assembly electorate of Armidale on 11 February 1950 because of the resignation of David Drummond (Country) to successfully contest the federal seat of New England at the 1949 election.

== Dates ==
Date	Event
28 October 1949	David Drummond resigned.
10 December 1949	1949 federal election
17 January 1950	Writ of election issued by the Speaker of the Legislative Assembly.
23 January 1950	Nominations
11 February 1950	Polling day
13 March 1950	Return of writ

== Result ==
1950 Armidale by-election Saturday 11 February
Party	Candidate	Votes	%	±%
Country	Davis Hughes	4,240	32.8	
Labor	Jim Cahill	6,064	46.9	
Country	William Fooks	2,616	20.3	
Total formal votes		12,920	99.1	
Informal votes		124	1.0	
Turnout		13,044	86.1	
Two-party-preferred result
Country	Davis Hughes	6,652	51.5	
Labor	Jim Cahill	6,268	48.5	
Country hold				

== See also ==
- Electoral results for the district of Armidale
- List of New South Wales state by-elections
