= 1903 Armidale state by-election =

Election result for Armidale, New South Wales, Australia

A by-election was held for the New South Wales Legislative Assembly electorate of Armidale on 12 December 1903 because of the resignation of Edmund Lonsdale (Liberal Reform) to successfully contest the federal seat of New England.

== Dates ==
Date	Event
31 October 1903	Edmund Lonsdale resigned.
19 November 1903	Writ of election issued by the Speaker of the Legislative Assembly.
1 December 1903	Nominations
12 December 1903	Polling day
16 December 1903	Federal election
23 December 1903	Return of writ

== Result ==
1903 Armidale by-election Saturday 12 December
Party	Candidate	Votes	%	±%
Liberal Reform	Sydney Kearney	642	45.2	−5.6
Independent	Charles Wilson	470	33.1	−16.2
Labour	William Watson	309	21.8	+21.8
Total formal votes		1,421	99.2	+0.4
Informal votes		11	0.8	−0.4
Turnout		1,432	54.1 (Note: based on a roll of 2,648 at the 1901 election.)	−16.3
Liberal Reform hold		Swing	−5.6	

== See also ==
- Electoral results for the district of Armidale
- List of New South Wales state by-elections
