= Electoral results for the district of Collaroy =

Election results for Collaroy, New South Wales, Australia

Collaroy, an electoral district of the Legislative Assembly in the Australian state of New South Wales was created in 1950 and abolished in 1973.

Election	Member	Party
1950	(Sir) Robert Askin	Liberal
1953	(Sir) Robert Askin	Liberal
1956	(Sir) Robert Askin	Liberal
1959	(Sir) Robert Askin	Liberal
1962	(Sir) Robert Askin	Liberal
1965	(Sir) Robert Askin	Liberal
1968	(Sir) Robert Askin	Liberal
1971	(Sir) Robert Askin	Liberal

== Election results ==
=== Elections in the 1970s ===
==== 1971 ====
1971 New South Wales state election: Collaroy
Party	Candidate	Votes	%	±%
Liberal	Robert Askin	15,492	62.0	−9.0
Australia	Brian Walker	4,922	19.7	+19.7
Independent	Frederick Adcock	2,429	9.7	+9.7
Democratic Labor	Lyle Antcliff	1,554	6.2	+6.2
Independent	Norman Ward	599	2.4	+2.4
Total formal votes		24,996	96.7	
Informal votes		841	3.3	
Turnout		25,837	91.0	
Two-candidate-preferred result
Liberal	Robert Askin	17,783	71.1	+0.1
Australia	Brian Walker	7,213	28.9	+28.9
Liberal hold		Swing	+0.1	

=== Elections in the 1960s ===
==== 1968 ====
1968 New South Wales state election: Collaroy
Party	Candidate	Votes	%	±%
Liberal	Robert Askin	18,415	71.0	−2.2
Labor	David Lawler	7,532	29.0	+4.6
Total formal votes		25,947	96.5	
Informal votes		938	3.5	
Turnout		26,885	93.3	
Liberal hold		Swing	−4.4	

==== 1965 ====
1965 New South Wales state election: Collaroy
Party	Candidate	Votes	%	±%
Liberal	Robert Askin	19,358	73.2	+0.7
Labor	William Bramwell	6,458	24.4	−0.2
Communist	Elfrida Morcom	634	2.4	−0.5
Total formal votes		26,450	98.3	−0.5
Informal votes		453	1.7	+0.5
Turnout		26,903	92.0	−1.3
Two-party-preferred result
Liberal	Robert Askin	19,485	73.7	+0.6
Labor	William Bramwell	6,965	26.3	−0.6
Liberal hold		Swing	+0.6	

==== 1962 ====
1962 New South Wales state election: Collaroy
Party	Candidate	Votes	%	±%
Liberal	Robert Askin	16,476	72.5	0.0
Labor	Peter Hopkins	5,591	24.6	−2.9
Communist	Stanley Deacon	649	2.9	+2.9
Total formal votes		22,716	98.8	
Informal votes		266	1.2	
Turnout		22,982	93.3	
Two-party-preferred result
Liberal	Robert Askin	16,606	73.1	+0.6
Labor	Peter Hopkins	6,110	26.9	−0.6
Liberal hold		Swing	+0.6	

=== Elections in the 1950s ===
==== 1959 ====
1959 New South Wales state election: Collaroy
Party	Candidate	Votes	%	±%
Liberal	Robert Askin	17,868	71.1	
Labor	Erwin Eder	7,266	28.9	
Total formal votes		25,134	98.4	
Informal votes		402	1.6	
Turnout		25,536	93.4	
Liberal hold		Swing		

==== 1956 ====
1956 New South Wales state election: Collaroy
Party	Candidate	Votes	%	±%
Liberal	Robert Askin	18,038	70.1	+6.8
Independent	Gordon Jones	6,334	24.6	+24.6
Communist	Elfrida Morcom	1,345	5.2	+5.2
Total formal votes		25,717	97.9	−0.1
Informal votes		557	2.1	+0.1
Turnout		26,274	93.5	+1.2
Two-candidate-preferred result
Liberal	Robert Askin	18,374	71.4	+8.1
Independent	Gordon Jones	7,343	28.6	+28.6
Liberal hold		Swing	N/A	

==== 1953 ====
1953 New South Wales state election: Collaroy
Party	Candidate	Votes	%	±%
Liberal	Robert Askin	12,722	63.3	
Labor	Evelyn Barron	7,360	36.7	
Total formal votes		20,082	98.0	
Informal votes		414	2.0	
Turnout		20,496	92.3	
Liberal hold		Swing		

==== 1950 ====
1950 New South Wales state election: Collaroy
Party	Candidate	Votes	%	±%
Liberal	Robert Askin	13,107	63.7	
Labor	John Masters	7,472	36.3	
Total formal votes		20,579	98.1	
Informal votes		404	1.9	
Turnout		20,983	92.1	
Liberal notional hold				

Collaroy was a new seat created out of the districts of Hornsby and Manly, both of which were held by the Liberal party.
