= Dunbier =

Dunbier is a surname. Notable people with the surname include:

- Augustus Dunbier (1888–1977), American painter
- Max Dunbier (1938–2016), Australian politician, son of Ron
- Ron Dunbier (1914–1984), Australian politician
- Scott Dunbier, American comic book editor
