= Bill McCarthy (politician) =

Australian politician

William John Patrick McCarthy (22 May 1923 – 25 April 1987) was an Australian politician. He was a Labor Party member of the New South Wales Legislative Assembly, representing Armidale from 1978 to 1981, and Northern Tablelands from 1981 to 1987.

McCarthy married Thelma on 8 March 1945, with whom had have three children. He served as a flying officer in the RAAF before becoming a grazier in 1959. From 1970 to 1978 he was a field officer with the Community Development and Extension Division.

In 1978, McCarthy was the Labor candidate for the Country Party-held state seat of Armidale; he narrowly defeated sitting MP David Leitch amid that year's massive Labor landslide to become only the second Labor member to win it. In 1981 the seat was abolished, and McCarthy contested the new seat of Northern Tablelands, which was essentially a merger of the old seats of Armidale and Tenterfield. Although the new seat had a notional National Country Party majority, McCarthy was elected. McCarthy resigned due to ill health on 22 April 1987 and died 3 days later. His widow Thelma was the Labor candidate in the resulting by-election but was defeated by National Party candidate Ray Chappell.

New South Wales Legislative Assembly
| Preceded by David Leitch | Member for Armidale; 1978–1981 | District abolished |
| New district | Member for Northern Tablelands; 1981–1987 | Succeeded by Ray Chappell |
