= Sydney Kearney =

Australian politician

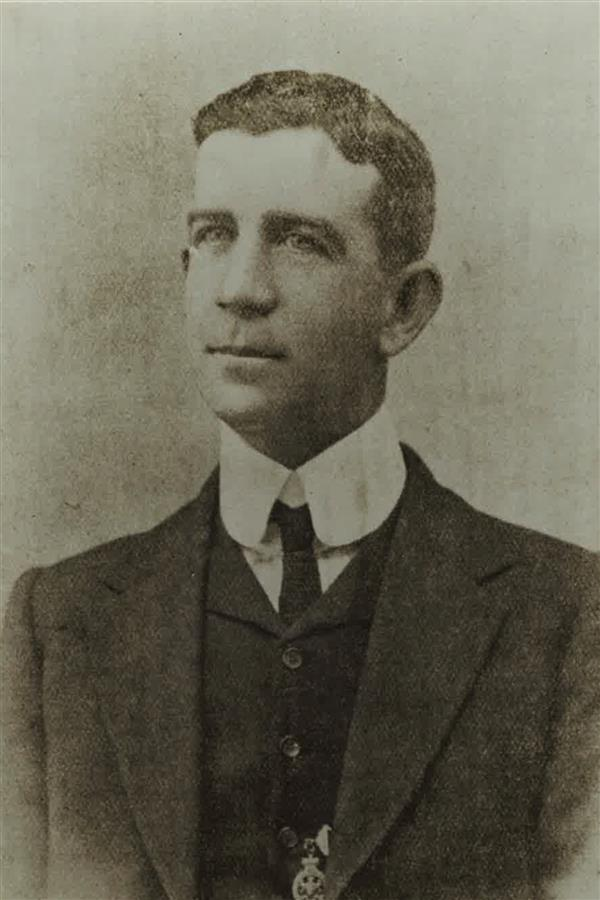
Sydney J Kearney, Mayor of Armidale

Sydney John Kearney (18 August 1870 – 16 April 1923) was an Australian politician.

Born in Sydney to solicitor Timothy John Kearney and Sarah Margaret Trim, he attended New England Grammar School and St Joseph's College, after which he was articled as a clerk to his father in 1889. In 1894 he was admitted as a solicitor, partnering with his father until the latter's retirement in 1896, when he became a land agent; he was also secretary of the Armidale Federation League in 1899. On 10 May 1903 he married Harriet Johannah Hughes, with whom he had six children. From 1904 he was a member of the Farmers' and Settlers' Association, and at the 1903 Armidale by-election he was elected as a Liberal member of the New South Wales Legislative Assembly, holding the seat at the 1904 election. In 1907 he was dropped as a candidate, but in 1908 he became an alderman at Armidale, serving as mayor in 1913. He left the council in 1917. Kearney later joined the Labor Party and was secretary of the Armidale Non-Conscription League in 1917; he contested the federal seat of New England for Labor in 1922. Kearney died at Armidale in 1923.

New South Wales Legislative Assembly
Preceded by Edmund Lonsdale	Member for Armidale; 1903 – 1907	Succeeded by Edmund Lonsdale
