= Charles Wilson (Australian politician) =

Australian politician

Charles G. Wilson MLA
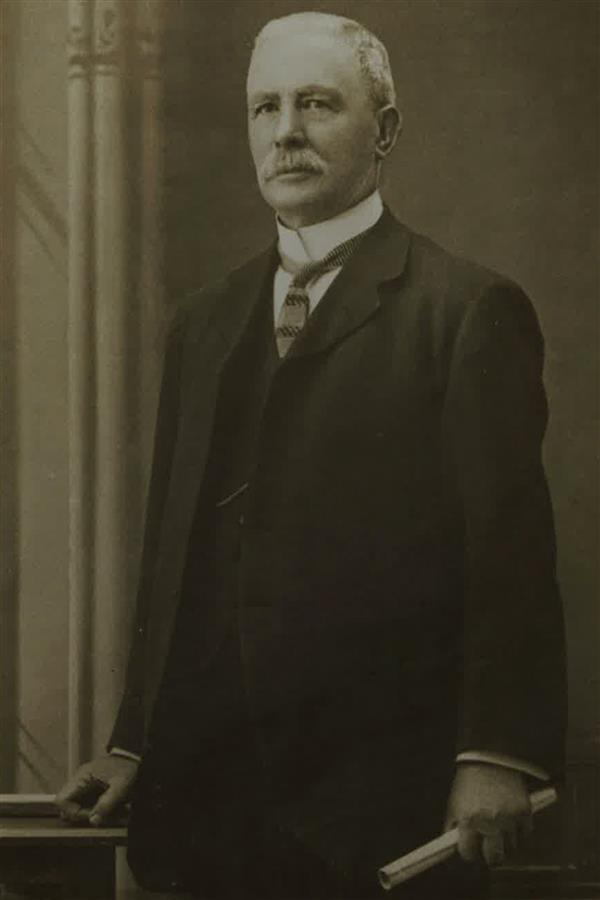
- Charles Graham Wilson, Mayor of Armidale

Member of the New South Wales Legislative Assembly for Armidale
- In office 1898 – 1901
- Preceded by: Edmund Lonsdale
- Succeeded by: Edmund Lonsdale

Mayor of Armidale
- In office 1890 – 1890
- In office 1894 – 1895
- In office 1897 – 1897
- In office 1901 – 1901
- In office 1908 – 1908

Personal details
- Born: May 12, 1842 Crossan House, County Tyrone, Ireland
- Died: August 14, 1926 (aged 83–84) Paignton, Devon, UK
- Party: National Federal Party
- Spouse: Annie Jane McBride
- Children: Six, including Sir Thomas George Wilson
- Occupation: Politician, auctioneer & financial agent

Charles Graham Wilson (c. 1842 – 21 August 1926) was an Australian politician.

== Biography ==
Wilson was born at Crossan House near Omagh, around 1842, the eighth of 12 children born to William Wilson and Elizabeth Graham. On coming to Australia, he initially lived at Warwick in Queensland, joining two of his brothers at their property, Ullathorne. He married Irish-born Annie McBride, to whom he became engaged in Ireland, in Sydney in January 1869, traveling from Queensland to meet the boat she arrived on. They were married by one of Wilson's elder brothers, the Rev. William Wilson, a Wesleyan minister. Wilson's sister Catherine was married to Queensland parliamentarian Thomas Johnson and his niece Emily Maud Wilson, daughter of his younger brother Wesley, was married to Sir Robin Edward Dysart Grey, 6th Baronet Grey of Fallodon.

Arriving in the Armidale area around 1869, Wilson spent three years managing his uncle John Moore's flour mill, then spent seventeen years as clerk for the Municipality of Armidale. During this time, he established the successful auctioneering firm of C. Wilson & Co. and served as its principal. In the mid 1880s, Wilson commissioned a house for himself and his family in Armidale, Loombra, a large brick Italianate house with stables, which still stands. By 1891, he was "...well on his way to becoming Armidale's largest urban landowner."

He and Annie were parents to six children, including Sir Thomas George Wilson (1876 - 1958), an obstetrician, gynaecologist and academic.

== Political Life ==
Wilson resigned as clerk of the Municipality of Armidale in 1890 and was elected to the council as an alderman the next day, spending twenty years as an alderman and serving as Mayor of Armidale in 1890, 1894-1895, 1897, 1901-1902 and 1908.

He stood for election to the New South Wales Legislative Assembly at the 1891 election as a Protectionist candidate for New England, however he was unsuccessful. At the 1898 election he was elected member for Armidale for the National Federal Party (formerly the Protectionist Party), with 56.3% of the vote, defeating the siting Free Trade member Edmund Lonsdale. He was defeated by Lonsdale at the following election in 1901, with 49.2% of the vote. He stood again at the 1903 Armidale by-election as an independent but was unsuccessful, with 33.1% of the vote.

== Later years ==
After his time in politics, Wilson continued to work as a successful auctioneer and financial agent, and traveled widely. He died at his residence at Paignton in Devon in 1926, aged 83–84 years. He was buried at Kilconquhar, Fife, Scotland with his wife, who predeceased him.

New South Wales Legislative Assembly
Preceded by Edmund Lonsdale	Member for Armidale; 1898–1901	Succeeded by Edmund Lonsdale
