= Vince Bruce =

Australian judge

The Honourable Vince Bruce KC

Judge of the Supreme Court of New South Wales
- In office 4 July 1994 – 8 March 1999

Personal details
- Born: 6 December 1942 (age 83) Sydney, New South Wales, Australia
- Education: The University of Sydney
- Occupation: Lawyer; jurist

Vince Bruce KC (born 6 December 1942) is an Australian judge who served on the Supreme Court of New South Wales from 1994 to 1999.

Bruce was born in Sydney to Vince and Eileen Bruce. He attended Sydney Technical High School and then Lyons High School in New York as part of the American Field Service Exchange Scheme. In 1965 he graduated from the University of Sydney with a Bachelor of Laws. He clerked for solicitor Alan Ritchie from 1963 to 1964 and was an associate to Sir Garfield Barwick from 1964 to 1965. In 1968 he was called to the bar. He ran twice for office as a Liberal candidate: for the state seat of Georges River in 1971 and for the federal seat of Barton at the 1972 election. He took silk in 1982.

He was twice an acting judge of the New South Wales Supreme Court (June – August 1990, July – August 1991) and was appointed to the Supreme Court on a permanent basis on 4 July 1994. He was criticised for delays in delivering judgements and, in 1998, the New South Wales Legislative Council narrowly voted not to remove him. He resigned from the bench in 1999.
