= 1971 New South Wales state election =

State election for New South Wales, Australia in February 1971

- 13 February 1971

All 96 seats in the New South Wales Legislative Assembly 49 Assembly seats were needed for a majority
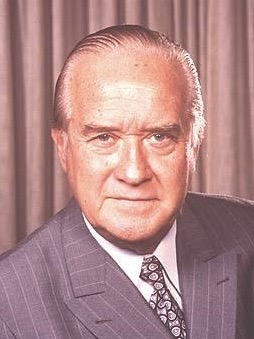

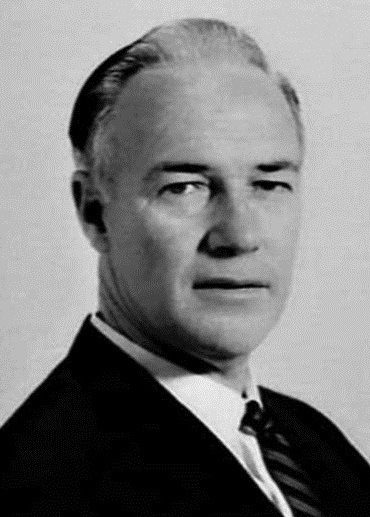
	First party	Second party
Leader	Robert Askin	Pat Hills
Party	Liberal–Country Coalition	Labor
Leader since	17 July 1959	2 December 1968
Leader's seat	Collaroy	Phillip
Last election	53 seats	39 seats
Seats won	49	45
Seat change	▼4	▲6
Percentage	44.39%	45.02%
Swing	▼4.71	▲1.93
- Two-candidate-preferred margin by electorate
Premier before election
Bob Askin
Liberal–Country Coalition
Elected Premier
Bob Askin
Liberal–Country Coalition

Elections for the New South Wales Legislative Assembly were held in the state of New South Wales, Australia, on Saturday 13 February 1971. The Liberal-Country Party coalition government led by Sir Robert Askin won a third term in office. The Labor Party opposition was led by Pat Hills.

The Legislative Assembly had been enlarged by two members to 96 for the 1971 election. The seats of Sturt and Casino were established. Until 2019, this was the last time the Coalition won a third-term in New South Wales.

== Key dates ==
Date	Event
13 January 1971	The Legislative Assembly was dissolved, and writs were issued by the Governor to proceed with an election.
22 January 1971	Nominations for candidates for the election closed at noon.
13 February 1971	Polling day, between the hours of 8am and 6pm.
11 March 1971	The fourth Askin-Cutler ministry was constituted.
16 March 1971	The writ was returned and the results formally declared.
16 March 1971	Parliament resumed for business.

== Results ==
New South Wales state election, 13 February 1971 Legislative Assembly << 1968–1973 >>
Enrolled voters	2,457,021 (Note: There were 2,496,868 enrolled voters but 39,847 were enrolled in electorates (one Labor and one Country) which were uncontested at the election.)				
Votes cast	2,291,484		Turnout	93.26	-0.93
Informal votes	53,628		Informal	2.34	-0.29
Summary of votes by party
Party	Primary votes	%	Swing	Seats	Change
Labor	1,007,538	45.02	+1.93	45	+ 6
Liberal	799,801	35.74	–2.73	32	– 4
Country	193,509	8.65	–1.98	17	± 0
Democratic Labor	71,050	3.17	+0.89	0	± 0
Australia	23,689	1.06	+1.06	0	± 0
Defence of Government Schools	10,850	0.48	+0.48	0	± 0
Communist	2,098	0.09	–0.18	0	± 0
Independent	129,321	5.78	+0.53	2	± 0
Total	2,237,856			96	

Popular vote
Labor	45.02%
Liberal	35.74%
Country	8.65%
Independents	5.78%
Democratic Labor	3.17%
Australia	1.06%
Others	0.58%
Parliamentary seats
Labor	45
Liberal	32
Country	17
Independents	2

== Seats changing hands ==
Seat	Pre-1971			Swing	Post-1971		
Seat	Party	Member	Margin	Swing	Margin	Member	Party
Burrendong	Country	Roger Wotton	5.9	-7.7	1.8	Leo Nott	Labor
Campbelltown	Liberal	Max Dunbier	2.4	-2.5	0.1	Cliff Mallam	Labor
Casino	Country	New seat	14.6	-17.1	2.5	Don Day	Labor
Gosford	Liberal	Ted Humphries	1.4	-4.0	2.6	Keith O'Connell	Labor
Nepean	Liberal	Ron Dunbier	5.2	-6.8	1.6	Ron Mulock	Labor
Wollongong	Liberal	Jack Hough	0.5	-0.6	0.1	Eric Ramsay	Labor

- In addition, Labor held the seat of Georges River, which it had won from the Liberals at the 1970 by-election.

== Post-election pendulum ==
Liberal/Country seats (49)
Marginal
South Coast	Jack Beale	LIB	0.9% v IND
Upper Hunter	Col Fisher	CP	1.7%
Bathurst	Clive Osborne	CP	1.9%
Ashfield	David Hunter	LIB	2.0%
Fuller	Peter Coleman	LIB	2.1%
Cronulla	Ian Griffith	LIB	2.5%
Miranda	Tim Walker	LIB	2.6%
Hurstville	Tom Mead	LIB	2.8%
Coogee	Kevin Ellis	LIB	2.9%
Monaro	Steve Mauger	LIB	3.2%
Young	George Freudenstein	CP	3.8%
Byron	Stanley Stephens	CP	4.5%
Yaralla	Lerryn Mutton	LIB	4.9%
Hawkesbury	Bernie Deane	LIB	5.0%
Clarence	Matt Singleton	CP	5.1%
Fairly safe
Barwon	Geoff Crawford	CP	6.7%
Temora	Jim Taylor	CP	7.0%
Earlwood	Eric Willis	LIB	7.3%
Wakehurst	Allan Viney	LIB	8.0%
Tamworth	Bill Chaffey	CP	8.1%
Dubbo	John Mason	LIB	8.2%
Tenterfield	Tim Bruxner	CP	8.7%
Safe
Albury	Gordon Mackie	LIB	10.0%
Maitland	Milton Morris	LIB	11.0%
Wollondilly	Tom Lewis	LIB	11.0%
Orange	Charles Cutler	CP	11.5%
Armidale	Davis Hughes	CP	11.9% v IND
Goulburn	Ron Brewer	CP	12.0%
Burwood	John Jackett	LIB	12.7%
Hornsby	John Maddison	LIB	13.1% v IND
Sturt	Tim Fischer	CP	14.3%
Willoughby	Laurie McGinty	LIB	14.5%
Eastwood	Jim Clough	LIB	14.8%
Raleigh	Jim Brown	CP	15.5%
Manly	Douglas Darby	LIB	15.8%
Kirribilli	John Waddy	LIB	16.0%
The Hills	Max Ruddock	LIB	16.5%
Bligh	John Barraclough	LIB	17.0%
Wagga Wagga	Wal Fife	LIB	18.0%
Gloucester	Leon Punch	CP	18.2%
Vaucluse	Keith Doyle	LIB	18.5% v IND
Lane Cove	Ken McCaw	LIB	19.1%
Collaroy	Robert Askin	LIB	21.1% v AP
Northcott	Jim Cameron	LIB	23.0% v AP
Mosman	Pat Morton	LIB	23.4%
Oxley	Bruce Cowan	CP	26.8% v IND
Davidson	Dick Healey	LIB	30.2% v DLP
Gordon	Harry Jago	LIB	31.6% v DLP
Lismore	Bruce Duncan	CP	unopp.

Labor seats (45)
Marginal
Campbelltown	Cliff Mallam	ALP	0.1%
Wollongong	Eric Ramsay	ALP	0.1%
Georges River	Frank Walker	ALP	1.4%
Nepean	Ron Mulock	ALP	1.6%
Burrendong	Leo Nott	ALP	1.8%
Casino	Don Day	ALP	2.5%
Gosford	Keith O'Connell	ALP	2.6%
Fairly safe
Murrumbidgee	Lin Gordon	ALP	6.2%
Kogarah	Bill Crabtree	ALP	6.4%
Drummoyne	Reg Coady	ALP	7.0%
Charlestown	Jack Stewart	ALP	8.3%
Waverley	Syd Einfeld	ALP	8.6%
Castlereagh	Jack Renshaw	ALP	8.7%
Parramatta	Dan Mahoney	ALP	8.7%
Rockdale	Brian Bannon	ALP	8.9%
Lakemba	Vince Durick	ALP	9.4%
Burrinjuck	Bill Sheahan	ALP	9.8%
Safe
Wentworthville	Ernie Quinn	ALP	10.8%
Maroubra	Bill Haigh	ALP	10.9%
Newcastle	Arthur Wade	ALP	11.3%
Blacktown	Gordon Barnier	ALP	12.2%
Canterbury	Kevin Stewart	ALP	12.5%
Heathcote	Rex Jackson	ALP	13.2%
East Hills	Joe Kelly	ALP	13.4%
Wyong	Harry Jensen	ALP	13.4%
Marrickville	Norm Ryan	ALP	13.5%
Bankstown	Nick Kearns	ALP	13.9%
Lake Macquarie	Merv Hunter	ALP	14.9%
Mount Druitt	Jim Southee	ALP	15.0%
Cook's River	Tom Cahill	ALP	16.1%
Fairfield	Eric Bedford	ALP	16.2%
Bass Hill	Clarrie Earl	ALP	16.8%
Merrylands	Jack Ferguson	ALP	17.2%
Granville	Pat Flaherty	ALP	17.3%
Auburn	Peter Cox	ALP	17.3%
Waratah	Sam Jones	ALP	18.6%
Liverpool	George Paciullo	ALP	18.7%
Wallsend	Ken Booth	ALP	19.4%
Corrimal	Laurie Kelly	ALP	20.0%
Illawarra	George Petersen	ALP	21.1%
Balmain	Roger Degen	ALP	23.0%
Phillip	Pat Hills	ALP	23.8%
King	Albert Sloss	ALP	27.5%
Cessnock	George Neilly	ALP	30.4%
Broken Hill	Lew Johnstone	ALP	unopp.
Crossbench seats (2)
Murray	Joe Lawson	IND	1.7% v CP
Blue Mountains	Harold Coates	IND	7.7% v ALP

== See also ==
- Candidates of the 1971 New South Wales state election
