= Herbert Lane =

Australian politician

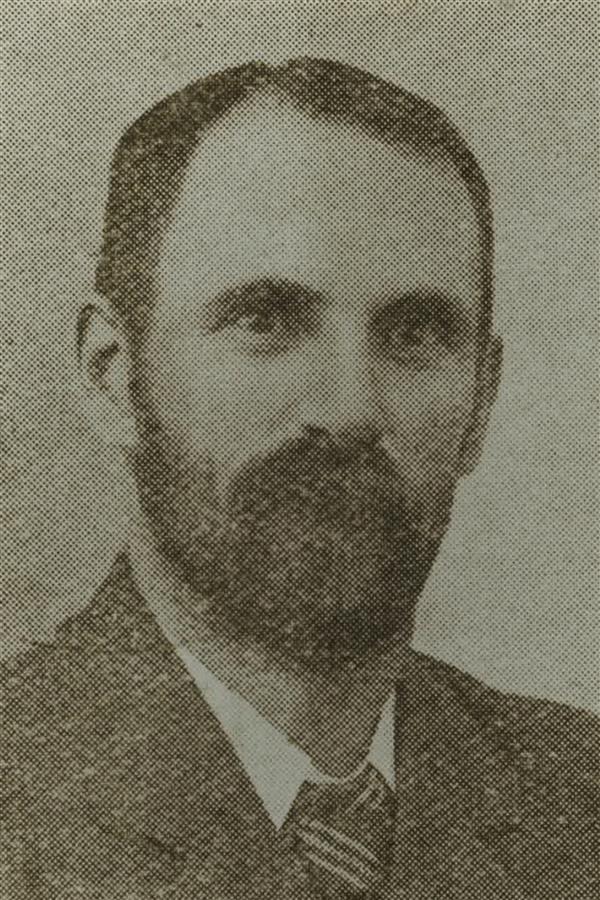
Herbert Lane, Mayor of Armidale

Herbert William Lane (1853 – 16 February 1938) was an Australian politician.

He was born in Norfolk, England, to land agent William Lane. While in England he married his first wife, Alice Pryke. He emigrated to Victoria in 1881, moving to New South Wales in 1890 where he worked as an auctioneer. On 2 April 1891 he married Kate Eliza Johnson; they had two children. He settled in Armidale, where he ran a furniture business and also served as an alderman from 1910 to 1917, including a period as mayor from 1914 to 1915. A Liberal, he was elected to the New South Wales Legislative Assembly in 1915 as the member for Armidale. He held the seat until 1920, when he was defeated running as a Nationalist for the multi-member seat of Northern Tableland. Lane died at Bondi in 1938.

New South Wales Legislative Assembly
Preceded by George Braund	Member for Armidale; 1915–1920	Abolished
