= Edmund Lonsdale =

Australian politician

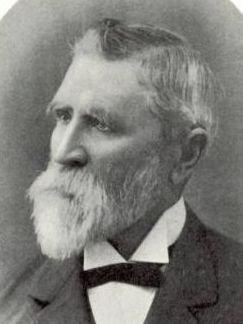

Member of the Australian Parliament for New England
- In office 16 December 1903 – 12 December 1906
- Preceded by: William Sawers
- Succeeded by: Frank Foster

Personal details
- Born: 31 October 1843 Morpeth, New South Wales
- Died: 4 October 1913 (aged 69)
- Party: Free Trade Party
- Occupation: Bricklayer, builder

Edmund Lonsdale (31 October 1843 – 4 October 1913) was an Australian politician. Born in Morpeth, New South Wales, he was schooled in Maitland before becoming a bricklayer, builder and contractor. He was also an alderman on Armidale Shire Council.

At the 1891 election he stood as a Free Trade candidate for New England and was the third of three members elected. Multi-member electorates were abolished for the 1894 election and Lonsdale was the Free Trade candidate for Armidale, however he was unsuccessful. He stood again at the Armidale and was elected with 50.4% of the vote. He only held the seat for one term, defeated by Charles Wilson at the 1898 election, with 43.7% of the vote.

Lonsdale was unsuccessful at the 1901 federal election for the seat of New England, but then returned to the Legislative Assembly, defeating Wilson at the 1901 state election, with 50.8% of the vote. He resigned in 1903 to successfully contest New England at the 1903 federal election. He only held the seat for one term, defeated at the 1906 federal election Lonsdale again then returned to the Legislative Assembly at the 1907 state election, with 52.0% of the vote, holding the seat at the 1910 state election, with 51.3% of the vote.

Lonsdale was severely injured when hit by a motor car at Hill Street, Uralla, on the evening of 4 October 1913; he died soon after while being transported to Armidale Hospital on a freight train. He died in office aged 69.

New South Wales Legislative Assembly
Preceded by New (third) seat	Member for New England; 1891 – 1894; Served alongside: Inglis, Copeland	Succeeded by Abolished
Preceded by Henry Copeland	Member for Armidale; 1895 – 1898	Succeeded by Charles Wilson
Preceded by Charles Wilson	Member for Armidale; 1901 – 1903	Succeeded by Sydney Kearney
Parliament of Australia
Preceded by William Sawers	Member for New England; 1903 – 1906	Succeeded by Frank Foster
New South Wales Legislative Assembly
Preceded by Sydney Kearney	Member for Armidale; 1907 – 1913	Succeeded by George Braund
