= Mary McNish =

Australian teacher and activist

Mary Elizabeth McNish, née Flower (c. 1926 – 10 August 2013) was an Australian teacher and activist.

McNish was the organising secretary of the JOBS project at the University of Sydney, which co-ordinated pre-vocational training and placement of 40 young Aborigines. She was a co-founder of the Australia Party and in 1971 was its state and national secretary. She was prominent in the Council for Civil Liberties, and in 1979 was arrested in Queensland for campaigning against the government's ban on street marches, together with Labor figures George Georges and George Petersen. She married twice, firstly John Olsen and secondly Alex McNish. She died in 2013.
