= George Braund =

Australian politician

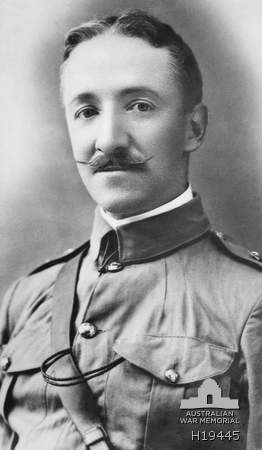
- George Braund c. 1914
- Born: 13 July 1866; Bideford, Devon, England
- Died: 4 May 1915 (aged 48); Gallipoli, Ottoman Turkey
- Military career
- Allegiance: Australia
- Branch: Australian Army
- Service years: 1893–1915
- Rank: Lieutenant Colonel
- Commands: 2nd Infantry Battalion
- Conflicts: First World War: Gallipoli Campaign †
- Awards: Volunteer Decoration; Mentioned in Despatches

George Frederick Braund, VD (13 July 1866 – 4 May 1915) was an Australian soldier and politician.

== Life ==
Braund was born in Bideford, Devon, England and was educated at Bideford Grammar School and migrated with his family to New South Wales, when he was 15. In 1889 his family moved to Armidale.

In 1893, Braund was commissioned second lieutenant in the Armidale company, 4th Australian Infantry Regiment and promoted to captain in 1899, major in 1912 and lieutenant-colonel in 1914. He was a magistrate and for many years was president of the Armidale Chamber of Commerce. Braund was elected as a member of the New South Wales Legislative Assembly in 1913, representing Armidale for the Liberal Party.

== War service ==
With the outbreak of the Great War and the creation of the Australian Imperial Force, Braund was appointed to raise and train the 2nd Infantry Battalion and he became its commander in August 1914. He was the first member of an Australian parliament to enlist in the war. On 25 April 1915, the first day of the landing at Anzac Cove, he landed with his troops and under sustained fire took and held a vital but isolated position. After midnight on 4 May, while returning to brigade headquarters, he took a short cut through scrub and apparently failed to hear a challenge from a sentry, who then shot him dead. He was one of only two serving Australian members of parliament to die in the Great War.

Braund was survived by a wife, two sons and a daughter.

== Honours ==
He was posthumously mentioned in despatches. On 30 November 1915 in the New South Wales Legislative Assembly the Speaker unveiled a commemorative tablet in honour of Braund and Sergeant Edward Larkin, the Member for Willoughby who also fell at Gallipoli. The plaque reads:

In time of Peace they readily asserted the rights of citizenship. In time of war they fiercely protected them.

== Notes ==
New South Wales Legislative Assembly
Preceded by Edmund Lonsdale	Member for Armidale; 1913–1915	Succeeded by Herbert Lane
