= Jim Cahill =

Australian politician

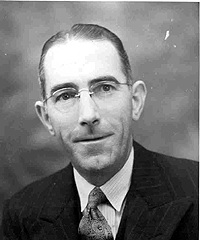
- in 1950

Personal details
- Born: 15 April 1903 near Quirindi, New South Wales
- Died: 21 August 1978 (aged 75) Yagoona, New South Wales
- Party: Labor Party

James Edward Cahill (15 April 1903 – 21 August 1978) was an Australian politician and a member of the New South Wales Legislative Assembly for one term from 1953 until 1956. He was also an indirectly elected member of the New South Wales Legislative Council between 1965 and 1978. He was a member of the Labor Party (ALP).

Cahill was born in the farming community of Blackville near Quirindi, New South Wales and was the son of a schoolteacher. Cyril Cahill a member of the Legislative Council between 1961 and 1977, was his brother (but neither was related to ALP Premier Joe Cahill).

Educated at Tamworth High School, Jim Cahill qualified as a licensed pharmacist. He owned a chemist's shop in Armidale and became involved in community organisations including Lions and the Chamber of Commerce. Having joined the local branch of the ALP in 1930, he served part-time in the Militia for five years.

After two unsuccessful attempts, Cahill was elected to the parliament as the Labor member for Armidale at the 1953 state election. He defeated the incumbent Country Party member Davis Hughes by 13 votes. Armidale was usually considered unwinnable for Labor but the result reflected the solid swing to the party at that election. Cahill held the seat for only one term but remained active in the Labor Party after his defeat in 1956. He was subsequently indirectly elected, on the party's nomination, to a seat in the Legislative council between 1965 and 1970. There he filled the casual vacancy which had been caused by the death of incumbent Michael Quinn. He did not hold party, parliamentary or ministerial office. He was re-elected in 1970 and served until the reconstitution of the Council in 1978.

New South Wales Legislative Assembly
Preceded by Davis Hughes	Member for Armidale; 1953 – 1956	Succeeded by Davis Hughes
