= Defence of Government Schools =

Australian political party and lobbyist

The Council for Defence of Government Schools was an Australian political lobby group and political party formed in 1966, which contested federal and state elections between 1969 and 1973 (with one outlying appearance in 1985). The group was primarily concerned with public education but also focused on pensions and housing policy. The group was founded by activists opposed to state aid for private schools, and although it achieved some significant results it never elected a representative to an Australian legislature.

The organisation achieved some historical notoriety with their High Court case which argued unsuccessfully that Commonwealth funding of religious schools contravened section 116 of the Constitution. which is now used as an example of the powers granted to the Commonwealth under section 96 of the Constitution.

Future Australian Labor Party senator Patricia Giles stood for parliament twice as a Defence of Government Schools candidate before joining the ALP.
