= David Leitch (politician) =

Australian politician

David Stanley Leitch (9 January 1923 – 18 January 1988) was an Australian politician. He was the Country Party member for Armidale in the New South Wales Legislative Assembly from 1973 to 1978.

Leitch was born in Leeton; his maternal grandfather was William Killen, a member of the Australian House of Representatives from 1922 to 1931. Leitch was educated by correspondence from All Saints College in Bathurst. He studied medicine at the University of Sydney and was subsequently appointed an honorary surgeon to the Armidale and New England Hospital. In 1942, he enlisted in the AIF and was posted to New Guinea, where he fought the Japanese at Shaggy Ridge. After his return he returned to his medical practice.

In 1973, the Country Party member for Armidale, Davis Hughes, resigned to accept the post of Agent-General in London. Leitch was one of two Country Party candidates for the by-election, in which he narrowly defeated the Labor candidate. He held the seat at the 1973 and 1976 elections, but he was defeated in 1978 by Labor candidate Bill McCarthy.

Leitch died in 1988 in Armidale.

New South Wales Legislative Assembly
Preceded by Davis Hughes	Member for Armidale; 1973–1978	Succeeded by Bill McCarthy
