= Electoral district of Collaroy =

Former state electoral district of New South Wales, Australia

Collaroy was an electoral district of the Legislative Assembly of the Australian state of New South Wales, created in the 1949 redistribution and first contested at the 1950 state election. The seat was created out of a large area covered by the seats of Hornsby to the north and Manly to the south. It was named after and included the Sydney suburb of Collaroy. It was abolished in 1973 and mostly replaced by Pittwater, with part of it being added to Wakehurst.

== Members for Collaroy ==
Member	Party	Term
(Sir) Robert Askin	Liberal	1950–1973

== Election results ==
1971 New South Wales state election: Collaroy
Party	Candidate	Votes	%	±%
Liberal	Robert Askin	15,492	62.0	−9.0
Australia	Brian Walker	4,922	19.7	+19.7
Independent	Frederick Adcock	2,429	9.7	+9.7
Democratic Labor	Lyle Antcliff	1,554	6.2	+6.2
Independent	Norman Ward	599	2.4	+2.4
Total formal votes		24,996	96.7	
Informal votes		841	3.3	
Turnout		25,837	91.0	
Two-candidate-preferred result
Liberal	Robert Askin	17,783	71.1	+0.1
Australia	Brian Walker	7,213	28.9	+28.9
Liberal hold		Swing	+0.1	
