= Max Dunbier =

Australian politician

Maxwell John Rowland "Max" Dunbier (3 February 1938 – 14 September 2016) was an Australian politician. He was the Liberal member for Campbelltown in the New South Wales Legislative Assembly from 1968 to 1971.

Dunbier was born in Guildford, the son of Ron Dunbier, who also served in the Assembly. He attended Newington College (1950–1952) before working in his father's car dealership. He later owned a farming property in Campbelltown. He married Beverley Hazel Phillis on 12 March 1960. Dunbier joined the Liberal Party in 1964; he was elected to Liverpool City Council in 1966, serving until 1969.

In 1968, Dunbier was selected as the Liberal candidate for the new seat of Campbelltown, which he won. He was defeated in 1971 by Cliff Mallam, a former Labor MP. Dunbier then contested preselection for the federal seat of Macarthur, defeating sitting member and fellow Old Newingtonian Jeff Bate. Bate ran as an Independent and the seat was won by Labor, after which Dunbier retired from politics.

Dunbier died on 14 September 2016 after a long illness, survived by his wife Beverley, five sons, twelve grandchildren and five great grandchildren.

New South Wales Legislative Assembly
Preceded by New seat	Member for Campbelltown; 1968–1971	Succeeded by Cliff Mallam
