= Davis Hughes =

Australian politician

The Honourable Sir Davis Hughes

Minister for Public Works
- In office 13 May 1965 – 17 January 1973
- Premier: Robert Askin
- Preceded by: Norm Ryan
- Succeeded by: Leon Punch
- Constituency: Armidale

Personal details
- Born: William Davis Hughes; 24 November 1910 Launceston, Tasmania, Australia
- Died: 16 March 2003 (aged 92) Erina, New South Wales, Australia
- Party: Country Party
- Spouse: Joan Johnson (1940–2003; his death)

Sir William Davis Hughes (24 November 1910 – 16 March 2003) was an Australian politician. He was notable for his involvement in the controversial resignation of architect Jørn Utzon from the Sydney Opera House project in 1966.

== Early life ==
Hughes was born in Launceston, Tasmania and was educated at Launceston High School and the University of Tasmania, although he did not graduate. He married Joan Johnson in 1940 and they had one son and two daughters. He was a school teacher in Tasmania from 1927 until 1935, at Caulfield Grammar in Melbourne, from 1936 until he enlisted in the Royal Australian Air Force (RAAF), and at The Armidale School from 1947 until 1950. He served in the RAAF from 1939 until 1945, achieving the rank of squadron leader.

== Political career ==
Hughes was elected as a member of the New South Wales Legislative Assembly for Armidale from 1950 to 1953 and 1956 to 1973 for the Country Party. In May 1958, he was elected leader of the Country Party in place of Michael Bruxner, defeating Charles Cutler by a single vote. He suffered a "gastric illness" in the lead-up to the 1959 state election and was hospitalised for over three weeks during the campaign, during which time Cutler served as acting leader. During the campaign it was also alleged that Hughes had fraudulently claimed to hold a university degree, despite never graduating. His illness and the controversy over his academic qualifications led to his resignation as Country Party leader after the election, with Cutler elected as his replacement. In a subsequent personal explanation to the Legislative Assembly, he stated that he had not deliberately misled parliament but acknowledged that he should have corrected the records to acknowledge that he had not actually graduated from university.

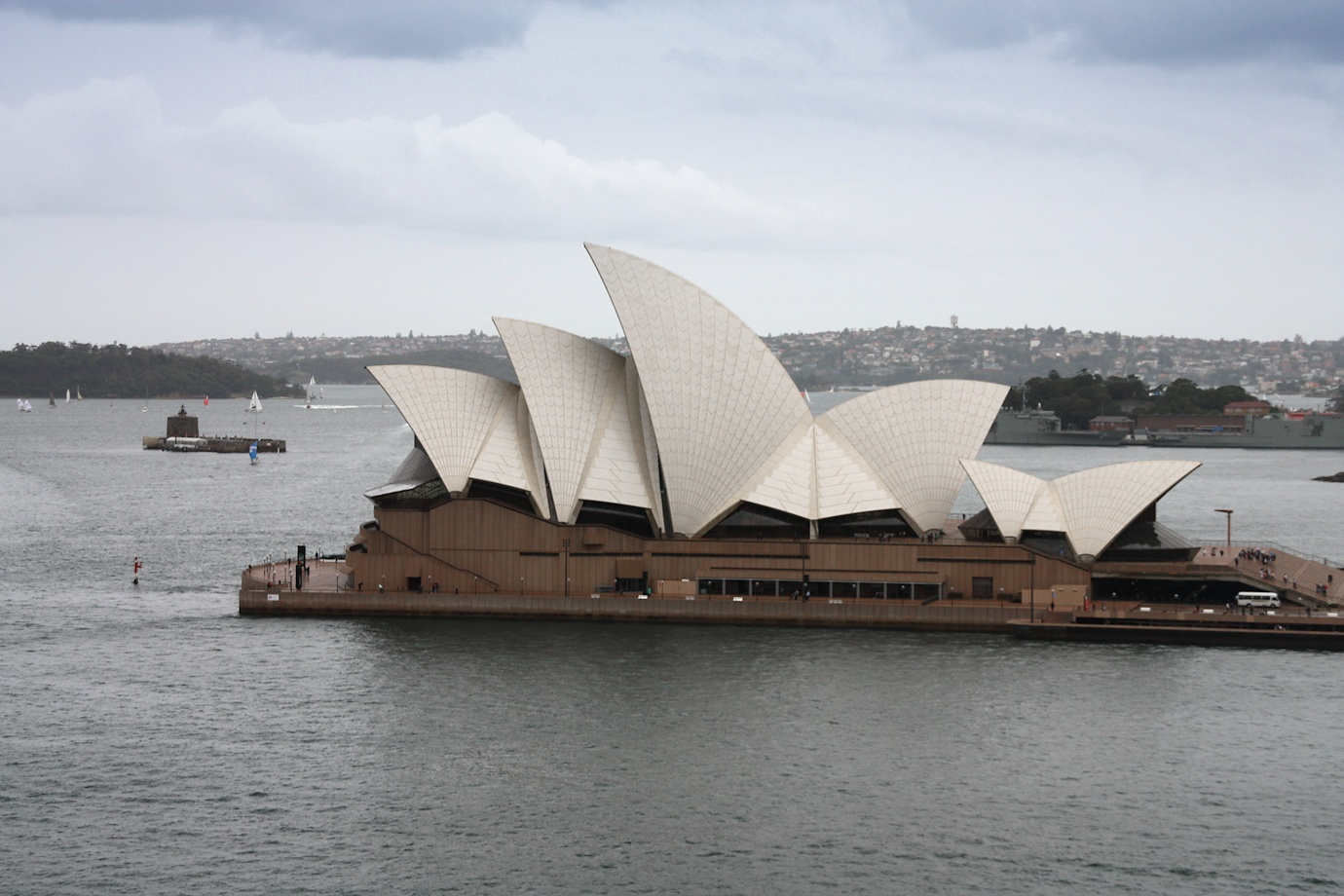
Hughes criticized Sydney Opera House construction management

With the election of the Askin government in 1965, Hughes became Minister for Public Works, with responsibility for, among other things, the completion of the Sydney Opera House. Hughes refused to accept Jørn Utzon's approach to managing the Opera House project and, specifically, the construction of plywood prototypes for its interiors. Hughes refused to pay a fee claim for £51,000, which meant that Utzon could not pay his staff. After a heated discussion about the claim, Utzon sent a letter of withdrawal to Hughes on 28 February 1966, stating: "You have forced me to the leave the job". In his media announcement made only hours after receiving the letter, Hughes stated it was Utzon's 'resignation'.

The Opera House was completed by another architect, Peter Hall, an ex-government architect from Sydney. Taking on the project, Hall deemed Utzon's seating plan as unsafe, and to improve this he made radical changes to the interior design, a decision for which he would be largely criticised. Despite this, the Opera House was completed under his watch and it eventually opened in 1973.

Upon his resignation from parliament in January 1973, Hughes was appointed NSW Agent-General in London.

== Later life ==
Hughes died in Erina, New South Wales on 16 March 2003, aged 92.

== Honours ==
Hughes was knighted in 1975, two years after resigning from parliament.

== Notes ==
New South Wales Legislative Assembly
Preceded by David Drummond	Member for Armidale; 1949 – 1953	Succeeded by Jim Cahill
Preceded by Jim Cahill	Member for Armidale; 1956 – 1973	Succeeded by David Leitch
Party political offices
Preceded by Sir Michael Bruxner	Leader of the New South Wales Country Party; 1958 – 1959	Succeeded by Sir Charles Cutler
Preceded by William Chaffey	Deputy Leader of the New South Wales Country Party; 1968 – 1973	Succeeded by Leon Punch
Diplomatic posts
Preceded by Jock Pagan	Agent-General for New South Wales; 1973–1977	Succeeded by Peter Valkenburg
