= Electoral district of Armidale =

Former state electoral district of New South Wales, Australia

Armidale was an electoral district of the Legislative Assembly in the Australian state of New South Wales, named after and including Armidale. It was originally created in 1894, when multi-member districts were abolished, and the three member district of New England was largely divided between Armidale, Uralla-Walcha and Bingara. In 1920, with the introduction of proportional representation, it was absorbed into Northern Tablelands, along with Gough and Tenterfield. It was recreated in 1927 and abolished in 1981 and partly replaced by the recreated Northern Tablelands.

== Members for Armidale ==
First incarnation (1894–1920)
Member	Party	Term
Henry Copeland	Protectionist	1894–1895
Edmund Lonsdale	Free Trade	1895–1898
Charles Wilson	Protectionist	1898–1901
Edmund Lonsdale	Liberal Reform	1901–1903
Sydney Kearney	Liberal Reform	1903–1907
Edmund Lonsdale	Liberal Reform	1907–1913
George Braund	Liberal Reform	1913–1915
Herbert Lane	Liberal Reform	1915–1917
Herbert Lane	Nationalist	1917–1920
Second incarnation (1927–1981)
Member	Party	Term
David Drummond	Country	1927–1949
Davis Hughes	Country	1949–1953
Jim Cahill	Labor	1953–1956
Davis Hughes	Country	1956–1973
David Leitch	Country	1973–1975
David Leitch	National Country	1975–1978
Bill McCarthy	Labor	1978–1981

== Election results ==
1978 New South Wales state election: Armidale
Party	Candidate	Votes	%	±%
Labor	Bill McCarthy	11,538	48.5	+5.1
National Country	David Leitch	11,345	47.7	−8.9
Democrats	Sidney Burkey	890	3.7	+3.7
Total formal votes		23,773	98.5	−0.2
Informal votes		349	1.5	+0.2
Turnout		24,122	94.1	+1.1
Two-party-preferred result
Labor	Bill McCarthy	12,034	50.6	+7.2
National Country	David Leitch	11,739	49.4	−7.2
Labor gain from National Country		Swing	+7.2	
