= Members of the New South Wales Legislative Assembly, 1991–1995 =

Members of the New South Wales Legislative Assembly who served in the 50th parliament held their seats from 1991 to 1995. They were elected at the 1991 state election, and at by-elections. The Speaker was Kevin Rozzoli.

Name	Party	Electorate	Term in office
Pam Allan	Labor	Blacktown	1988–2007
Richard Amery	Labor	Mount Druitt	1983–2015
Peter Anderson	Labor	Liverpool	1978–1988, 1989-1995
John Aquilina	Labor	Riverstone	1981–2011
Tony Aquilina	Labor	St Marys	1988–1995
Ian Armstrong	National	Lachlan	1981–2007
Bruce Baird	Liberal	Northcott	1984–1995
Don Beck	National	Murwillumbah	1984–1999
Bill Beckroge	Labor	Broken Hill	1981–1999
Peter Blackmore	Liberal	Maitland	1981–1999
Don Bowman	Labor	Swansea	1981–1988, 1991–1995
Bob Carr	Labor	Maroubra	1983–2005
Ian Causley	National	Clarence	1984–1996
Ray Chappell	National	Northern Tablelands	1987–1999
Kerry Chikarovski	Liberal	Lane Cove	1991–2003
Mick Clough	Labor	Bathurst	1976–1988, 1991–1999
Peter Cochran	National	Monaro	1988–1998
Anne Cohen	Liberal	Badgerys Creek	1988–1995
Peter Collins	Liberal	Willoughby	1981–2003
Paul Crittenden	Labor	Wyong	1991–2007
Adrian Cruickshank	National	Murrumbidgee	1984–1999
Wes Davoren	Labor	Lakemba	1984–1995
Peter Debnam (Note: Vaucluse Liberal MLA Michael Yabsley resigned on 18 March 1994. Liberal candidate Peter Debnam won the resulting by-election on 9 April.)	Liberal	Vaucluse	1994–2011
Chris Downy	Liberal	Sutherland	1988–1997
Tony Doyle (Note: Peats Labor MLA Tony Doyle resigned on 20 December 1994 due to illness. He died three days later, on 23 December. No by-election was held due to the proximity of the 1995 state election.)	Labor	Peats	1985–1994
Richard Face	Labor	Charlestown	1972–2003
John Fahey	Liberal	Southern Highlands	1984–1996
Andrew Fraser	National	Coffs Harbour	1990–2019
Bryce Gaudry	Labor	Newcastle	1991–2007
Paul Gibson	Labor	Londonderry	1988–2011
Ian Glachan	Liberal	Albury	1988–2003
Bob Graham (Note: The incumbent Liberal member for the seat of The Entrance, Bob Graham, was initially declared re-elected, but had his victory overturned by the Court of Disputed Returns on 11 December 1991 after a challenge from Labor candidate Grant McBride. McBride subsequently won the resulting by-election on 18 January 1992.)	Liberal	The Entrance	1988–1991
Nick Greiner (Note: Ku-ring-gai Liberal MLA and outgoing Premier Nick Greiner resigned on 24 June 1992. Liberal candidate Stephen O'Doherty won the resulting by-election on 22 August.)	Liberal	Ku-ring-gai	1980–1992
Terry Griffiths (Note: Georges River MLA Terry Griffiths was elected as a member of the Liberal Party, but resigned from the party on 29 October 1994, and served out the remainder of his term as an independent.)	Liberal/Independent	Georges River	1988–1995
Deirdre Grusovin	Labor	Heffron	1990–2003
Bob Harrison	Labor	Kiama	1986–1999
Gabrielle Harrison (Note: Parramatta Labor MLA Andrew Ziolkowski died on 12 April 1994. Ziolkowski's widow, Labor candidate Gabrielle Harrison, won the resulting by-election on 27 August.)	Labor	Parramatta	1994–2003
Chris Hartcher	Liberal	Gosford	1988–2015
John Hatton	Independent	South Coast	1973–1995
Brad Hazzard	Liberal	Wakehurst	1991–2023
Andrew Humpherson (Note: Davidson MLA Dr Terry Metherell was elected as a member of the Liberal Party, but resigned from the party on 29 October 1991. He served as an independent for several months before resigning from parliament on 10 April 1992 to take up an appointment in the public service, which ultimately sparked the Metherell affair and led to the demise of the Greiner government. He was replaced by Andrew Humpherson in the resulting by-election on 2 May.)	Liberal	Davidson	1992–2007
Jeff Hunter	Labor	Lake Macquarie	1991–2007
Morris Iemma	Labor	Hurstville	1991–2008
Geoff Irwin	Labor	Fairfield	1984–1995
Bruce Jeffery	National	Oxley	1984–1999
Liz Kernohan	Liberal	Camden	1991–2003
Malcolm Kerr	Liberal	Cronulla	1984–2011
Jeremy Kinross (Note: Gordon Liberal MLA Tim Moore resigned on 1 July 1992. Liberal candidate Jeremy Kinross won the resulting by-election on 22 August.)	Liberal	Gordon	1992–1999
Michael Knight	Labor	Campbelltown	1981–2003
Craig Knowles	Labor	Moorebank	1990–2005
Brian Langton	Labor	Kogarah	1983–1999
Faye Lo Po'	Labor	Penrith	1991–2003
Jim Longley	Liberal	Pittwater	1986–1996
Peter Macdonald	Independent	Manly	1991–1999
Wendy Machin	National	Port Macquarie	1985–1996
Col Markham	Labor	Keira	1988–2003
Bob Martin	Labor	Port Stephens	1988, 1988–1999
Grant McBride	Labor	The Entrance	1992–2011
Ian McManus	Labor	Bulli	1987–2003
Reba Meagher (Note: Cabramatta Labor MLA John Newman was assassinated on 12 April 1994. Labor candidate Reba Meagher won the resulting by-election on 22 October.)	Labor	Cabramatta	1994–2008
Wayne Merton	Liberal	Baulkham Hills	1988–2011
Terry Metherell	Liberal/Independent	Davidson	1981–1992
John Mills	Labor	Wallsend	1988–2007
Clover Moore	Independent	Bligh	1988–2012
Tim Moore	Liberal	Gordon	1976–1992
Barry Morris (Note: Blue Mountains Liberal MLA Barry Morris resigned on 14 December 1994. No by-election was held, as the 1995 state election was only five months away.)	Liberal	Blue Mountains	1988–1994
Kevin Moss	Labor	Canterbury	1986–2003
John Murray	Labor	Drummoyne	1982–2003
Wal Murray	National	Barwon	1976–1995
Peter Nagle	Labor	Auburn	1988–2001
Stan Neilly	Labor	Cessnock	1981–1988, 1991–1999
John Newman	Labor	Cabramatta	1986–1994
Sandra Nori	Labor	Port Jackson	1988–2007
Stephen O'Doherty	Liberal	Ku-ring-gai	1992–2003
Tony Packard (Note: The Hills Liberal MLA Tony Packard resigned on 27 July 1993. Liberal candidate Michael Richardson won the resulting by-election on 28 August.)	Liberal	The Hills	1990–1993
Don Page	National	Ballina	1988–2015
Ernie Page	Labor	Coogee	1981–2003
Gerry Peacocke	National	Dubbo	1981–1999
Ivan Petch	Liberal	Gladesville	1988–1995
Ron Phillips	Liberal	Miranda	1984–1999
Michael Photios	Liberal	Ermington	1988–1999
John Price	Labor	Waratah	1984–2007
Andrew Refshauge	Labor	Marrickville	1983–2005
Michael Richardson	Liberal	The Hills	1993–2011
Bill Rixon	National	Lismore	1988–1999
Pat Rogan	Labor	East Hills	1973–1999
Kevin Rozzoli	Liberal	Hawkesbury	1973–2003
Terry Rumble	Labor	Illawarra	1988–1999
Joe Schipp	Liberal	Wagga Wagga	1975–1999
Alby Schultz	Liberal	Burrinjuck	1988–1998
Carl Scully	Labor	Smithfield	1990–2007
Doug Shedden	Labor	Bankstown	1987–1999
Jillian Skinner (Note: North Shore Liberal MLA Phillip Smiles resigned on 20 December 1993. Liberal candidate Jillian Skinner won the resulting by-election on 5 February 1994.)	Liberal	North Shore	1994–2017
Jim Small	National	Murray	1985–1999
Phillip Smiles	Liberal	North Shore	1984–1993
Russell Smith	Liberal	Bega	1988–2003
George Souris	National	Upper Hunter	1988–2015
Gerry Sullivan	Labor	Wollongong	1991–1999
George Thompson	Labor	Rockdale	1991–2003
Andrew Tink	Liberal	Eastwood	1988–2007
John Turner	National	Myall Lakes	1988–2011
Garry West	National	Orange	1976–1996
Paul Whelan	Labor	Ashfield	1976–2003
Tony Windsor	Independent	Tamworth	1991–2001
Michael Yabsley	Liberal	Vaucluse	1984–1988, 1988–1994
Kim Yeadon	Labor	Granville	1990–2007
Paul Zammit	Liberal	Strathfield	1984–1996
Andrew Ziolkowski	Labor	Parramatta	1991–1994

== See also ==
- Second Greiner ministry
- First Fahey ministry
- Second Fahey ministry
- Third Fahey ministry
- Results of the 1991 New South Wales state election (Legislative Assembly)
- Candidates of the 1991 New South Wales state election
