= Results of the 1991 New South Wales Legislative Assembly election =

State election for New South Wales, Australia in March 1991

Party	Votes	%	+/–	Seats	+/–
Labor	1,204,066	39.05	▲0.57	46	▲3
Liberal	1,053,100	34.16	▼1.64	32	▼7
National	324,214	10.52	▼3.22	17	▼3
Independents	256,223	8.31	▲0.14	4	▼3
Democrats	165,229	5.36	▲3.55	0	Steady
Call to Australia	36,807	1.19	▲0.75	0	Steady
Country Residents	16,557	0.54	▲0.54	0	Steady
Greens	16,556	0.54	New	0	New
Citizens Electoral Council	5,198	0.17	New	0	New
Others	5,310	0.17	▼1.39	0	Steady
Total	3,083,260	100.00	–	99	–
Valid votes	3,083,260	90.68			
Invalid/blank votes	316,832	9.32	▲6.04		
Total votes	3,400,092	100.00	–		
Registered voters/turnout	3,631,618	93.62	▲0.04		
Source: NSW Parliament
Two-party-preferred
Liberal/National Coalition	1,539,949	52.75	▼3.27		
Labor	1,379,267	47.25	▲3.27		
Total	2,919,216	100.00	–		

This is a list of electoral district results for the 1991 New South Wales state election.

== Results by Electoral district ==
=== Albury ===
1991 New South Wales state election: Albury
Party	Candidate	Votes	%	±%
Liberal	Ian Glachan	19,759	61.6	+23.2
Labor	Peter Rowe	10,574	33.0	−1.6
Call to Australia	Fred Showler	954	3.0	+3.0
Citizens Electoral Council	John Kerr	764	2.4	+2.4
Total formal votes		32,051	92.8	−5.7
Informal votes		2,475	7.2	+5.7
Turnout		34,526	93.1	−0.8
Two-party-preferred result
Liberal	Ian Glachan	20,620	65.3	+3.6
Labor	Peter Rowe	10,955	34.7	−3.6
Liberal hold		Swing	+3.6	

=== Ashfield ===
1991 New South Wales state election: Ashfield
Party	Candidate	Votes	%	±%
Labor	Paul Whelan	13,853	49.2	+6.2
Liberal	Ralph Buono	9,347	33.2	−1.1
Democrats	Robert Dawson	2,177	7.7	+3.7
Independent	Paul Wakim	1,594	5.7	+5.7
Independent	Ron Poulsen	708	2.5	+2.5
Call to Australia	Clay Wilson	497	1.8	+1.8
Total formal votes		28,176	85.4	−9.1
Informal votes		4,819	14.6	+9.1
Turnout		32,995	90.3	
Two-party-preferred result
Labor	Paul Whelan	15,733	59.9	+4.1
Liberal	Ralph Buono	10,554	40.1	−4.1
Labor hold		Swing	+4.1	

=== Auburn ===
1991 New South Wales state election: Auburn
Party	Candidate	Votes	%	±%
Labor	Peter Nagle	18,528	61.8	+13.0
Liberal	Fahmi Hussain	8,391	28.0	+0.7
Democrats	Marcus Weyland	1,720	5.7	+5.7
Independent	Ed Dogramaci	1,357	4.5	+4.5
Total formal votes		29,996	85.5	−9.9
Informal votes		5,076	14.5	+9.9
Turnout		35,072	94.4	
Two-party-preferred result
Labor	Peter Nagle	19,793	68.1	+9.2
Liberal	Fahmi Hussain	9,290	31.9	−9.2
Labor hold		Swing	+9.2	

=== Badgerys Creek ===
1991 New South Wales state election: Badgerys Creek
Party	Candidate	Votes	%	±%
Liberal	Anne Cohen	14,844	48.9	+5.2
Labor	Diane Beamer	12,975	42.8	+2.6
Independent	Ray Allan	1,471	4.9	+4.8
Independent EFF	David Bryant	1,040	3.4	−10.0
Total formal votes		30,330	88.2	−8.0
Informal votes		4,045	11.8	+8.0
Turnout		34,375	94.2	
Two-party-preferred result
Liberal	Anne Cohen	15,555	52.5	−0.6
Labor	Diane Beamer	14,091	47.5	+0.6
Liberal notional hold		Swing	−0.6	

Badgerys Creek was a new seat with a notional Liberal majority.

=== Ballina ===
1991 New South Wales state election: Ballina
Party	Candidate	Votes	%	±%
National	Don Page	18,378	56.2	−4.5
Labor	Maureen Lane	8,321	25.4	−3.1
Independent	Fast Bucks	3,521	10.8	+10.8
Democrats	Andrew Mignot	1,573	4.8	+0.3
Call to Australia	Alan Sims	907	2.8	+2.8
Total formal votes		32,700	95.8	−2.3
Informal votes		1,430	4.2	+2.3
Turnout		34,130	93.0	
Two-party-preferred result
National	Don Page	19,580	63.3	−3.9
Labor	Maureen Lane	11,372	36.7	+3.9
National hold		Swing	−3.9	

=== Bankstown ===
1991 New South Wales state election: Bankstown
Party	Candidate	Votes	%	±%
Labor	Doug Shedden	16,368	60.1	+11.8
Liberal	Paul Barrett	10,889	39.9	+1.8
Total formal votes		27,257	67.5	−18.9
Informal votes		8,363	23.5	+18.9
Turnout		35,620	94.5	
Labor hold		Swing	+5.3	

=== Barwon ===
1991 New South Wales state election: Barwon
Party	Candidate	Votes	%	±%
National	Wal Murray	16,682	50.9	−19.6
Labor	Steve Funnell	8,154	24.9	+0.5
Country Residents	Bevan O'Regan	4,718	14.4	+14.4
Democrats	Jenni Birch	3,236	9.9	+8.4
Total formal votes		32,790	93.3	−4.5
Informal votes		2,361	6.7	+4.5
Turnout		35,151	93.0	
Two-party-preferred result
National	Wal Murray	19,869	65.1	−8.9
Labor	Steve Funnell	10,659	34.9	+8.9
National hold		Swing	−8.9	

=== Bathurst ===
1991 New South Wales state election: Bathurst
Party	Candidate	Votes	%	±%
Labor	Mick Clough	15,958	48.2	+8.6
Liberal	David Berry	12,822	38.7	+14.2
Country Residents	Mal Rich	2,211	6.7	+6.7
Democrats	John Merkel	2,143	6.5	+0.8
Total formal votes		33,134	94.0	−4.1
Informal votes		2,111	6.0	+4.1
Turnout		35,245	95.5	
Two-party-preferred result
Labor	Mick Clough	17,486	55.1	+10.3
Liberal	David Berry	14,239	44.9	−10.3
Labor gain from Liberal		Swing	+10.3	

=== Baulkham Hills ===
1991 New South Wales state election: Baulkham Hills
Party	Candidate	Votes	%	±%
Liberal	Wayne Merton	20,500	65.2	−5.3
Labor	Bill Pinkstone	8,232	26.2	−3.3
Democrats	Brian Shoebridge	2,690	8.6	+8.6
Total formal votes		31,422	90.7	−6.0
Informal votes		3,240	9.3	+6.0
Turnout		34,662	95.9	
Two-party-preferred result
Liberal	Wayne Merton	21,308	69.7	−0.8
Labor	Bill Pinkstone	9,245	30.3	+0.8
Liberal notional hold		Swing	−0.8	

Baulkham Hills was a new seat with a notional Liberal majority.

=== Bega ===
1991 New South Wales state election: Bega
Party	Candidate	Votes	%	±%
Liberal	Russell Smith	17,925	58.7	+22.5
Labor	Ian Marshall	9,232	30.2	+9.0
Democrats	Denise Redmond	3,402	11.1	+10.0
Total formal votes		30,559	92.0	−5.8
Informal votes		2,671	8.0	+5.8
Turnout		33,230	92.3	
Two-party-preferred result
Liberal	Russell Smith	18,669	62.8	−2.4
Labor	Ian Marshall	11,082	37.2	+2.4
Liberal hold		Swing	−2.4	

=== Blacktown ===
1991 New South Wales state election: Blacktown
Party	Candidate	Votes	%	±%
Labor	Pam Allan	15,354	50.2	+1.9
Liberal	Ray Morris	9,802	32.1	−3.0
Independent	Con Constantine	3,253	10.6	+10.6
Democrats	Diana Shanks	1,182	3.9	+3.0
Call to Australia	John Jerrow	781	2.6	+2.6
Citizens Electoral Council	Paul Georiadis	199	0.7	+0.7
Total formal votes		30,571	87.3	−8.5
Informal votes		4,437	12.7	+8.5
Turnout		35,008	94.5	
Two-party-preferred result
Labor	Pam Allan	16,472	58.3	+3.4
Liberal	Ray Morris	11,784	41.7	−3.4
Labor hold		Swing	+3.4	

=== Bligh ===
1991 New South Wales state election: Bligh
Party	Candidate	Votes	%	±%
Independent	Clover Moore	12,801	43.7	+21.6
Liberal	Carol Dance	11,764	40.2	−9.7
Labor	Anne-Maree Whitaker	4,729	16.1	−9.6
Total formal votes		29,294	91.5	−4.9
Informal votes		2,710	8.5	+4.9
Turnout		32,004	87.3	
Two-candidate-preferred result
Independent	Clover Moore	15,762	56.1	+11.4
Liberal	Carol Dance	12,352	43.9	−11.4
Independent notional gain from Liberal		Swing	+11.4	

Bligh became a notional Liberal seat as a result of the 1990 redistribution, however Clover Moore (Independent) retained the seat with an increased margin.

=== Blue Mountains ===
1991 New South Wales state election: Blue Mountains
Party	Candidate	Votes	%	±%
Liberal	Barry Morris	13,469	41.9	−3.2
Labor	Jim Angel	11,667	36.3	−7.1
Democrats	Steve Bailey	2,799	8.7	−1.3
Call to Australia	Shirley Grigg	1,317	4.1	+3.4
Independent	Bob Kennedy	1,029	3.2	+3.2
Independent	William Mulcahy	745	2.3	+2.3
Independent	Colin Slade	744	2.3	+2.3
Country Residents	Paul Arico	373	1.2	+1.2
Total formal votes		32,143	94.4	−3.2
Informal votes		1,913	5.6	+3.2
Turnout		34,056	93.5	
Two-party-preferred result
Liberal	Barry Morris	15,663	52.6	+2.1
Labor	Jim Angel	14,093	47.4	−2.1
Liberal hold		Swing	+2.1	

=== Broken Hill ===
1991 New South Wales state election: Broken Hill
Party	Candidate	Votes	%	±%
Labor	Bill Beckroge	16,600	53.2	+9.1
National	Peter Laird	8,996	28.8	−14.1
Liberal	David Atkins	2,909	9.3	−3.1
Democrats	Keith Ridley	1,121	3.6	+3.1
Country Residents	Mary Casey-Marshall	1,021	3.3	+3.3
Independent	George Diamantes	558	1.8	+1.8
Total formal votes		31,205	90.5	−6.2
Informal votes		3,291	9.5	+6.2
Turnout		34,496	92.6	
Two-party-preferred result
Labor	Bill Beckroge	17,479	60.1	+12.1
National	Peter Laird	11,628	39.9	−12.1
Labor notional gain from National		Swing	+12.1	

Broken Hill became a notional Country seat as a result of the 1990 redistribution, however Bill Beckroge (Labor) retained the seat with an increased margin.

=== Bulli ===
1991 New South Wales state election: Bulli
Party	Candidate	Votes	%	±%
Labor	Ian McManus	17,189	52.2	+1.6
Liberal	Cheryl Hill	10,220	31.0	−9.7
Greens	Carole Medcalf	2,553	7.7	+7.7
Democrats	Greg O'Brien	1,861	5.6	+1.9
Call to Australia	Colin Scott	1,132	3.4	+3.4
Total formal votes		32,955	93.9	−3.1
Informal votes		2,131	6.1	+3.1
Turnout		35,086	94.5	
Two-party-preferred result
Labor	Ian McManus	19,344	63.2	+6.9
Liberal	Cheryl Hill	11,263	36.8	−6.9
Labor notional hold		Swing	+6.9	

Bulli was a new seat with a notional Labor majority.

=== Burrinjuck ===
1991 New South Wales state election: Burrinjuck
Party	Candidate	Votes	%	±%
Liberal	Alby Schultz	17,848	58.8	+33.5
Labor	George Martin	12,489	41.2	+0.8
Total formal votes		30,337	86.1	−12.3
Informal votes		4,909	13.9	+12.3
Turnout		35,246	94.7	
Liberal hold		Swing	+1.9	

=== Cabramatta ===
1991 New South Wales state election: Cabramatta
Party	Candidate	Votes	%	±%
Labor	John Newman	14,431	51.7	+0.1
Liberal	Bill Karagiannis	6,096	21.8	−19.1
Independent	Phuong Ngo	3,320	11.9	+11.9
Independent	Maria Heggie	2,486	8.9	+8.9
Independent	Anthony Thai	625	2.2	+2.2
Independent	Albert Ranse	487	1.7	+1.7
Democrats	Sam McLeod	473	1.7	+0.5
Total formal votes		27,918	82.2	−12.0
Informal votes		6,047	17.8	+12.0
Turnout		33,965	93.9	
Two-party-preferred result
Labor	John Newman	16,171	66.0	+10.5
Liberal	Bill Karagiannis	8,319	34.0	−10.5
Labor hold		Swing	+10.5	

=== Camden ===
1991 New South Wales state election: Camden
Party	Candidate	Votes	%	±%
Liberal	Liz Kernohan	14,957	47.8	+3.7
Labor	Peter Primrose	13,330	42.6	+5.4
Independent	Karen Willis	2,991	9.6	+9.6
Total formal votes		31,278	89.7	−7.1
Informal votes		3,579	10.3	+7.1
Turnout		34,857	94.2	
Two-party-preferred result
Liberal	Liz Kernohan	15,693	51.5	−4.5
Labor	Peter Primrose	14,756	48.5	+4.5
Liberal gain from Labor		Swing	−4.5	

=== Campbelltown ===
1991 New South Wales state election: Campbelltown
Party	Candidate	Votes	%	±%
Labor	Michael Knight	16,353	55.0	+7.1
Liberal	Charlie Lynn	10,703	36.0	+4.6
Democrats	Sharon Kellett	2,660	9.0	+9.0
Total formal votes		29,716	85.7	−10.6
Informal votes		4,943	14.3	+10.6
Turnout		34,659	94.2	
Two-party-preferred result
Labor	Michael Knight	17,275	59.9	+3.4
Liberal	Charlie Lynn	11,569	40.1	−3.4
Labor hold		Swing	+3.4	

=== Canterbury ===
1991 New South Wales state election: Canterbury
Party	Candidate	Votes	%	±%
Labor	Kevin Moss	15,756	52.6	+3.1
Liberal	Carlo Favorito	12,154	40.5	+5.1
Democrats	Garry Dalrymple	2,066	6.9	+6.9
Total formal votes		29,976	84.7	−10.6
Informal votes		5,411	15.3	+10.6
Turnout		35,387	93.4	
Two-party-preferred result
Labor	Kevin Moss	16,715	56.8	+1.0
Liberal	Carlo Favorito	12,699	43.2	−1.0
Labor hold		Swing	+1.0	

=== Cessnock ===
1991 New South Wales state election: Cessnock
Party	Candidate	Votes	%	±%
Labor	Stan Neilly	15,838	50.7	+5.5
Liberal	Bob Roberts	12,910	41.4	+8.7
Democrats	Denis Rothwell	1,357	4.3	+4.3
Independent	Jim White	1,106	3.5	+3.5
Total formal votes		31,211	91.4	−5.5
Informal votes		2,938	8.6	+5.5
Turnout		34,149	95.3	
Two-party-preferred result
Labor	Stan Neilly	16,612	54.4	+4.8
Liberal	Bob Roberts	13,915	45.6	−4.8
Labor gain from Liberal		Swing	+4.8	

=== Charlestown ===
1991 New South Wales state election: Charlestown
Party	Candidate	Votes	%	±%
Labor	Richard Face	17,465	54.5	+8.5
Liberal	Judith Lloyd	9,399	29.3	−4.7
Independent	Steve Owens	2,574	8.0	+8.0
Democrats	Graham Pritchard	1,892	5.9	+5.6
Call to Australia	Robin Budge	714	2.2	+2.2
Total formal votes		32,044	92.2	−4.7
Informal votes		2,711	7.8	+4.7
Turnout		34,755	95.9	
Two-party-preferred result
Labor	Richard Face	19,301	63.1	+10.7
Liberal	Judith Lloyd	11,268	36.9	−10.7
Labor hold		Swing	+10.7	

=== Clarence ===
1991 New South Wales state election: Clarence
Party	Candidate	Votes	%	±%
National	Ian Causley	16,991	53.5	−11.9
Labor	Olive Boundy	9,173	28.9	−4.6
Democrats	Martin Frohlich	3,828	12.0	+11.2
Independent	John Stanmore	992	3.1	+3.1
Call to Australia	Doug Williams	784	2.5	+2.5
Total formal votes		31,768	95.0	−2.9
Informal votes		1,678	5.0	+2.9
Turnout		33,446	94.1	
Two-party-preferred result
National	Ian Causley	18,304	60.6	−5.4
Labor	Olive Boundy	11,923	39.4	+5.4
National hold		Swing	−5.4	

=== Coffs Harbour ===
1991 New South Wales state election: Coffs Harbour
Party	Candidate	Votes	%	±%
National	Andrew Fraser	16,625	52.5	−16.2
Labor	Bruce Clarke	11,434	36.1	+12.3
Democrats	Sue Arnold	2,106	6.7	−0.7
Independent	May Southgate	1,062	3.4	+3.4
Independent	Evalds Erglis	439	1.4	+1.4
Total formal votes		31,666	95.4	−2.5
Informal votes		1,544	4.6	+2.5
Turnout		33,210	93.8	
Two-party-preferred result
National	Andrew Fraser	17,547	57.0	−15.3
Labor	Bruce Clarke	13,263	43.0	+15.3
National hold		Swing	−15.3	

=== Coogee ===
1991 New South Wales state election: Coogee
Party	Candidate	Votes	%	±%
Labor	Ernie Page	14,013	43.5	+0.1
Liberal	Allan Andrews	13,215	41.0	−1.4
Democrats	Peter Feltis	1,625	5.0	−0.3
Independent	Claude Danzey	1,335	4.1	+4.1
Independent	Charles Matthews	1,089	3.4	+3.4
Independent	Jack Dillon	957	3.0	+3.0
Total formal votes		32,234	93.8	−3.4
Informal votes		2,135	6.2	+3.4
Turnout		34,369	90.8	
Two-party-preferred result
Labor	Ernie Page	15,994	51.6	+0.7
Liberal	Allan Andrews	15,021	48.4	−0.7
Labor hold		Swing	+0.7	

=== Cronulla ===
1991 New South Wales state election: Cronulla
Party	Candidate	Votes	%	±%
Liberal	Malcolm Kerr	18,722	57.8	+3.8
Labor	Tony Brownlow	10,944	33.8	+2.6
Democrats	Terri Richardson	2,719	8.4	+8.4
Total formal votes		32,385	92.1	−5.4
Informal votes		2,784	7.9	+5.4
Turnout		35,169	93.8	
Two-party-preferred result
Liberal	Malcolm Kerr	19,396	61.3	0.0
Labor	Tony Brownlow	12,252	38.7	0.0
Liberal hold		Swing	0.0	

=== Davidson ===
1991 New South Wales state election: Davidson
Party	Candidate	Votes	%	±%
Liberal	Terry Metherell	21,237	65.4	−1.7
Labor	Ian Faulks	6,172	19.0	−0.2
Democrats	Felicity Boyd	5,069	15.6	+14.1
Total formal votes		32,478	91.8	−5.5
Informal votes		2,889	8.2	+5.5
Turnout		35,367	93.5	
Two-party-preferred result
Liberal	Terry Metherell	22,577	72.7	−1.5
Labor	Ian Faulks	8,481	27.3	+1.5
Liberal hold		Swing	−1.5	

=== Drummoyne ===
1991 New South Wales state election: Drummoyne
Party	Candidate	Votes	%	±%
Labor	John Murray	15,185	47.1	+6.6
Liberal	Michael Cantali	13,688	42.5	−2.3
Greens	Bruce Threlfo	1,416	4.4	+4.4
Independent	Gillian Lewis	816	2.5	+2.5
Democrats	Julien Droulers	761	2.4	−0.5
Independent	Robert Maddrell	364	1.1	+1.1
Total formal votes		32,230	92.1	−4.0
Informal votes		2,747	7.9	+4.0
Turnout		34,977	93.4	
Two-party-preferred result
Labor	John Murray	16,660	53.6	+4.3
Liberal	Michael Cantali	14,419	46.4	−4.3
Labor notional gain from Liberal		Swing	+4.3	

Drummoyne became a notional Liberal seat as a result of the 1990 redistribution, however John Murray (Labor) retained the seat with an increased margin.

=== Dubbo ===
1991 New South Wales state election: Dubbo
Party	Candidate	Votes	%	±%
National	Gerry Peacocke	19,155	60.5	−10.4
Labor	Owen Evans	9,160	28.9	+0.9
Democrats	Ken Graham	1,977	6.2	+5.2
Call to Australia	Ian Bones	1,353	4.3	+4.3
Total formal votes		31,645	92.7	−5.1
Informal votes		2,501	7.3	+5.1
Turnout		34,146	93.9	
Two-party-preferred result
National	Gerry Peacocke	20,494	66.9	−4.7
Labor	Owen Evans	10,154	33.1	+4.7
National hold		Swing	−4.7	

=== East Hills ===
1991 New South Wales state election: East Hills
Party	Candidate	Votes	%	±%
Labor	Pat Rogan	17,257	54.1	−1.1
Liberal	Max Parker	11,518	36.1	−5.1
Independent	David Sparkes	2,105	6.6	+6.6
Democrats	Robert Springett	993	3.1	+3.1
Total formal votes		31,873	90.5	−6.1
Informal votes		3,363	9.5	+6.1
Turnout		35,236	95.4	
Two-party-preferred result
Labor	Pat Rogan	18,242	58.7	+1.7
Liberal	Max Parker	12,809	41.3	−1.7
Labor hold		Swing	+1.7	

=== Eastwood ===
1991 New South Wales state election: Eastwood
Party	Candidate	Votes	%	±%
Liberal	Andrew Tink	20,341	62.4	−0.9
Labor	John Quessy	8,133	24.9	−2.7
Democrats	Chris Dunkerley	2,856	8.8	−0.4
Independent	Zero-Population-Growth	1,291	4.0	+4.0
Total formal votes		32,621	93.4	−3.8
Informal votes		2,319	6.6	+3.8
Turnout		34,940	94.1	
Two-party-preferred result
Liberal	Andrew Tink	21,609	68.7	+1.4
Labor	John Quessy	9,850	31.3	−1.4
Liberal hold		Swing	+1.4	

=== Ermington ===
1991 New South Wales state election: Ermington
Party	Candidate	Votes	%	±%
Liberal	Michael Photios	17,498	56.0	+4.7
Labor	Margaret Blaxell	11,056	35.4	−7.2
Democrats	Cameron Ward	2,717	8.7	+2.5
Total formal votes		31,271	91.1	−6.0
Informal votes		3,038	8.9	+6.0
Turnout		34,309	93.5	
Two-party-preferred result
Liberal	Michael Photios	18,232	59.7	+5.1
Labor	Margaret Blaxell	12,324	40.3	−5.1
Liberal notional hold		Swing	+5.1	

Ermington was a new seat with a notional Liberal majority.

=== Fairfield ===
1991 New South Wales state election: Fairfield
Party	Candidate	Votes	%	±%
Labor	Geoff Irwin	15,046	55.2	+0.4
Liberal	John Natoli	8,868	32.5	−5.5
Call to Australia	Keith Smith	1,925	7.1	+7.1
Democrats	Chad Zadourian	1,416	5.2	+1.0
Total formal votes		27,255	80.9	−13.4
Informal votes		6,447	19.1	+13.4
Turnout		33,702	92.8	
Two-party-preferred result
Labor	Geoff Irwin	15,773	61.3	+3.0
Liberal	John Natoli	9,947	38.7	−3.0
Labor hold		Swing	+3.0	

=== Georges River ===
1991 New South Wales state election: Georges River
Party	Candidate	Votes	%	±%
Liberal	Terry Griffiths	16,966	52.5	+0.8
Labor	Philip Sansom	10,117	31.3	−3.0
Independent	Bill Pickering	1,716	5.3	−2.7
Independent	Ross Green	1,318	4.1	+4.1
Democrats	Paul Kekel	1,038	3.2	+3.2
Independent	Fred Cavanagh	1,010	3.1	+3.1
Independent	Brian Meyer	121	0.4	−0.2
Total formal votes		32,286	93.3	−4.5
Informal votes		2,304	6.7	+4.5
Turnout		34,590	94.4	
Two-party-preferred result
Liberal	Terry Griffiths	18,226	61.4	+1.3
Labor	Philip Sansom	11,468	38.6	−1.3
Liberal hold		Swing	+1.3	

=== Gladesville ===
1991 New South Wales state election: Gladesville
Party	Candidate	Votes	%	±%
Liberal	Ivan Petch	15,448	48.0	+6.8
Labor	John Watkins	13,462	41.8	+0.4
Democrats	Noel Plumb	2,514	7.8	+6.4
Call to Australia	Robyn Peebles	792	2.5	+2.5
Total formal votes		32,216	90.9	−5.8
Informal votes		3,216	9.1	+5.8
Turnout		35,432	94.1	
Two-party-preferred result
Liberal	Ivan Petch	16,543	52.9	+0.5
Labor	John Watkins	14,724	47.1	−0.5
Liberal hold		Swing	+0.5	

=== Gordon ===
1991 New South Wales state election: Gordon
Party	Candidate	Votes	%	±%
Liberal	Tim Moore	23,984	74.5	−4.9
Labor	Ian Latham	3,617	11.2	−4.1
Democrats	Michelle Herfurth	3,350	10.4	+5.2
Call to Australia	John Swan	1,244	3.9	+3.9
Total formal votes		32,195	94.1	−3.6
Informal votes		2,019	5.9	+3.6
Turnout		34,214	92.7	
Two-party-preferred result
Liberal	Tim Moore	25,505	83.5	+1.3
Labor	Ian Latham	5,023	16.5	−1.3
Liberal hold		Swing	+1.3	

=== Gosford ===
1991 New South Wales state election: Gosford
Party	Candidate	Votes	%	±%
Liberal	Chris Hartcher	15,328	48.9	−0.9
Labor	Stephen Goodwin	10,078	32.1	−4.5
Independent	Robert Bell	3,817	12.2	+12.2
Democrats	Andrew Penfold	1,464	4.7	−0.9
Call to Australia	Eric Trezise	677	2.2	−5.9
Total formal votes		31,364	94.1	−3.1
Informal votes		1,949	5.9	+3.1
Turnout		33,313	93.9	
Two-party-preferred result
Liberal	Chris Hartcher	16,940	56.7	−0.7
Labor	Stephen Goodwin	12,915	43.3	+0.7
Liberal hold		Swing	−0.7	

=== Granville ===
1991 New South Wales state election: Granville
Party	Candidate	Votes	%	±%
Labor	Kim Yeadon	17,560	56.4	+0.2
Liberal	Les Osmond	9,690	31.1	−0.9
Independent	Peter Sayegh	1,998	6.4	+6.4
Democrats	Clinton Reynolds	1,055	3.4	+3.3
Call to Australia	Keith Barron	843	2.7	−5.0
Total formal votes		31,146	87.6	−7.2
Informal votes		4,408	12.4	+7.2
Turnout		35,554	94.3	
Two-party-preferred result
Labor	Kim Yeadon	18,256	61.9	+0.7
Liberal	Les Osmond	11,213	38.1	−0.7
Labor hold		Swing	+0.7	

=== Hawkesbury ===
1991 New South Wales state election: Hawkesbury
Party	Candidate	Votes	%	±%
Liberal	Kevin Rozzoli	19,347	63.2	−7.0
Labor	Bob Benson	6,362	20.8	−7.9
Democrats	Michael Antrum	2,190	7.2	+7.2
Independent	Carl Bazeley	1,984	6.5	+6.5
Independent	Richard Mezinec	381	1.2	+1.2
Citizens Electoral Council	Warwick Gummerson	325	1.1	+1.1
Total formal votes		30,589	92.7	−4.1
Informal votes		2,425	7.3	+4.1
Turnout		33,014	93.0	
Two-party-preferred result
Liberal	Kevin Rozzoli	21,129	72.8	+1.8
Labor	Bob Benson	7,881	27.2	−1.8
Liberal hold		Swing	+1.8	

=== Heffron ===
1991 New South Wales state election: Heffron
Party	Candidate	Votes	%	±%
Labor	Deirdre Grusovin	17,100	58.0	+1.8
Liberal	John Paterson	8,928	30.3	−1.8
Greens	Mark Berriman	2,208	7.5	+7.5
Democrats	Eamon Quinn	1,227	4.2	+3.4
Total formal votes		29,463	84.0	−11.5
Informal votes		5,623	16.0	+11.5
Turnout		35,086	93.0	
Two-party-preferred result
Labor	Deirdre Grusovin	18,102	65.7	+4.2
Liberal	John Paterson	9,463	34.3	−4.2
Labor hold		Swing	+4.2	

=== Hurstville ===
1991 New South Wales state election: Hurstville
Party	Candidate	Votes	%	±%
Labor	Morris Iemma	15,141	48.8	+2.3
Liberal	Phil White	13,063	42.1	0.0
Independent	Tony Wild	1,699	5.5	+5.5
Democrats	Paul Terrett	1,140	3.7	+3.7
Total formal votes		31,043	88.7	−7.5
Informal votes		3,962	11.3	+7.5
Turnout		35,005	94.7	
Two-party-preferred result
Labor	Morris Iemma	16,382	54.6	+2.8
Liberal	Phil White	13,620	45.4	−2.8
Labor gain from Liberal		Swing	+2.8	

=== Illawarra ===
1991 New South Wales state election: Illawarra
Party	Candidate	Votes	%	±%
Labor	Terry Rumble	20,347	61.3	+12.6
Liberal	Dennis Owen	7,878	23.7	−9.7
Democrats	Neil Smith	3,306	10.0	+10.0
Call to Australia	Brian Hughes	1,647	5.0	−0.3
Total formal votes		33,178	95.7	0.0
Informal votes		1,498	4.3	0.0
Turnout		34,676	94.9	
Two-party-preferred result
Labor	Terry Rumble	21,766	69.7	+11.6
Liberal	Dennis Owen	9,441	30.3	−11.6
Labor hold		Swing	+11.6	

=== Keira ===
1991 New South Wales state election: Keira
Party	Candidate	Votes	%	±%
Labor	Col Markham	16,339	52.3	+7.3
Liberal	David Moulds	10,361	33.1	−1.4
Democrats	Alan Davidson	2,813	9.0	+9.0
Call to Australia	Robert O'Neill	1,756	5.6	+5.6
Total formal votes		31,269	89.8	−6.8
Informal votes		3,533	10.2	+6.8
Turnout		34,802	94.9	
Two-party-preferred result
Labor	Col Markham	18,052	60.5	+6.0
Liberal	David Moulds	11,780	39.5	−6.0
Labor hold		Swing	+6.0	

=== Kiama ===
1991 New South Wales state election: Kiama
Party	Candidate	Votes	%	±%
Labor	Bob Harrison	16,925	53.6	+3.2
Liberal	Phillip Motbey	10,345	32.8	−9.7
Democrats	Kerry Sharpe	2,648	8.4	+7.2
Call to Australia	Glen Ryan	1,660	5.3	+4.6
Total formal votes		31,578	90.3	−6.4
Informal votes		3,382	9.7	+6.4
Turnout		34,960	94.4	
Two-party-preferred result
Labor	Bob Harrison	18,524	61.4	+7.8
Liberal	Phillip Motbey	11,644	38.6	−7.8
Labor hold		Swing	+7.8	

=== Kogarah ===
1991 New South Wales state election: Kogarah
Party	Candidate	Votes	%	±%
Labor	Brian Langton	15,376	49.5	+5.1
Liberal	Pat O'Brien	13,873	44.7	+0.8
Democrats	John Mukai	1,819	5.9	+5.9
Total formal votes		31,068	88.8	−7.7
Informal votes		3,917	11.2	+7.7
Turnout		34,985	93.6	
Two-party-preferred result
Labor	Brian Langton	16,270	53.3	+1.7
Liberal	Pat O'Brien	14,254	46.7	−1.7
Labor hold		Swing	+1.7	

=== Ku-ring-gai ===
1991 New South Wales state election: Ku-ring-gai
Party	Candidate	Votes	%	±%
Liberal	Nick Greiner	20,588	62.4	−3.9
Labor	Sue Deane	6,023	18.3	−10.2
Democrats	Ted Roach	2,995	9.1	+9.1
Independent	Mick Gallagher	2,638	8.0	+8.0
Call to Australia	Robert Taylor	737	2.2	+2.2
Total formal votes		32,981	93.7	−3.6
Informal votes		2,203	6.3	+3.6
Turnout		35,184	94.1	
Two-party-preferred result
Liberal	Nick Greiner	22,491	72.7	+3.8
Labor	Sue Deane	8,441	27.3	−3.8
Liberal hold		Swing	+3.8	

=== Lachlan ===
1991 New South Wales state election: Lachlan
Party	Candidate	Votes	%	±%
National	Ian Armstrong	18,289	56.7	−14.2
Labor	Peter Gordon	9,126	28.3	+0.5
Country Residents	Peter Mallon	2,332	7.2	+7.2
Independent	Colin Wilson	1,355	4.2	+4.2
Democrats	Neil Bartlett	1,176	3.6	+3.6
Total formal votes		32,278	92.7	−5.1
Informal votes		2,544	7.3	+5.1
Turnout		34,822	95.3	
Two-party-preferred result
National	Ian Armstrong	20,197	66.2	−5.8
Labor	Peter Gordon	10,314	33.8	+5.8
National hold		Swing	−5.8	

=== Lake Macquarie ===
1991 New South Wales state election: Lake Macquarie
Party	Candidate	Votes	%	±%
Labor	Jeff Hunter	16,726	53.3	+11.4
Liberal	Cameron Phillips	8,738	27.9	+3.5
Independent	Alan Davis	2,878	9.2	+9.2
Democrats	Lyla Koelink	2,154	6.9	+6.9
Call to Australia	Margaret Neale	874	2.8	+2.8
Total formal votes		31,370	91.6	−5.8
Informal votes		2,865	8.4	+5.8
Turnout		34,235	94.0	
Two-party-preferred result
Labor	Jeff Hunter	18,483	62.7	+5.9
Liberal	Cameron Phillips	10,980	37.3	−5.9
Labor hold		Swing	+5.9	

=== Lakemba ===
1991 New South Wales state election: Lakemba
Party	Candidate	Votes	%	±%
Labor	Wes Davoren	15,110	51.6	+3.4
Liberal	Karl Tartak	9,369	32.0	−0.4
Democrats	Amelia Newman	2,513	8.6	+8.6
Independent	Michael Hawatt	2,264	7.7	+7.7
Total formal votes		29,256	84.2	−10.4
Informal votes		5,499	15.8	+10.4
Turnout		34,755	92.7	
Two-party-preferred result
Labor	Wes Davoren	16,506	59.4	+2.1
Liberal	Karl Tartak	11,267	40.6	−2.1
Labor hold		Swing	+2.1	

=== Lane Cove ===
1991 New South Wales state election: Lane Cove
Party	Candidate	Votes	%	±%
Liberal	Kerry Chikarovski	21,425	67.5	−5.0
Labor	Luther Weate	5,777	18.2	−7.1
Democrats	Simon Disney	4,531	14.3	+12.6
Total formal votes		31,733	92.8	−4.0
Informal votes		2,466	7.2	+4.0
Turnout		34,199	92.0	
Two-party-preferred result
Liberal	Kerry Chikarovski	22,537	73.7	0.0
Labor	Luther Weate	8,049	26.3	0.0
Liberal hold		Swing	0.0	

=== Lismore ===
1991 New South Wales state election: Lismore
Party	Candidate	Votes	%	±%
National	Bill Rixon	18,301	57.6	−8.1
Labor	Janelle Saffin	8,875	27.9	+2.5
Democrats	Anne Simons	1,993	6.3	−0.1
Greens	Joy Wallace	1,471	4.6	+4.6
Independent	Bob Hopkins	1,156	3.6	+3.6
Total formal votes		31,796	94.3	−3.6
Informal votes		1,930	5.7	+3.6
Turnout		33,726	94.2	
Two-party-preferred result
National	Bill Rixon	19,204	62.2	−8.2
Labor	Janelle Saffin	11,661	37.8	+8.2
National hold		Swing	−8.2	

=== Liverpool ===
1991 New South Wales state election: Liverpool
Party	Candidate	Votes	%	±%
Labor	Peter Anderson	16,777	57.6	−2.8
Liberal	Gloria Arora	6,921	23.8	−10.4
Independent	Colin Harrington	4,019	13.8	+13.8
Democrats	Susan Robinson	932	3.2	+1.1
Socialist Labour	Nick Beams	311	1.1	+1.1
Citizens Electoral Council	Albert Perish	150	0.5	+0.5
Total formal votes		29,110	85.5	−9.3
Informal votes		4,943	14.5	+9.3
Turnout		34,053	92.5	
Two-party-preferred result
Labor	Peter Anderson	17,981	66.5	+3.2
Liberal	Gloria Arora	9,060	33.5	−3.2
Labor hold		Swing	+3.2	

=== Londonderry ===
1991 New South Wales state election: Londonderry
Party	Candidate	Votes	%	±%
Labor	Paul Gibson	17,136	64.0	+14.0
Liberal	Cheryle Symonds	9,632	36.0	−1.9
Total formal votes		26,768	77.8	−17.0
Informal votes		7,655	22.2	+17.0
Turnout		34,423	92.8	
Labor hold		Swing	+9.3	

=== Maitland ===
1991 New South Wales state election: Maitland
Party	Candidate	Votes	%	±%
Liberal	Peter Blackmore	12,046	36.7	+10.3
Labor	Tony Keating	11,973	36.5	+3.4
Independent	Bob Horne	5,288	16.1	+16.1
Independent	Pat Hughes	1,744	5.3	+5.3
Democrats	Malcolm Martin	1,079	3.3	+0.5
Call to Australia	Tom Toogood	672	2.0	+2.0
Total formal votes		32,802	92.5	−5.2
Informal votes		2,671	7.5	+5.2
Turnout		35,473	96.2	
Two-party-preferred result
Liberal	Peter Blackmore	14,680	50.6	−6.8
Labor	Tony Keating	14,335	49.4	+6.8
Liberal gain from Labor		Swing	−6.8	

=== Manly ===
1991 New South Wales state election: Manly
Party	Candidate	Votes	%	±%
Liberal	David Hay	14,768	45.7	−15.8
Independent	Peter Macdonald	11,294	34.9	+34.9
Labor	Ivan Hurwitz	5,097	15.8	−16.7
Democrats	Jane King	1,177	3.6	−2.5
Total formal votes		32,336	93.6	−3.4
Informal votes		2,212	6.4	+3.4
Turnout		34,548	92.1	
Two-candidate-preferred result
Independent	Peter Macdonald	15,707	50.7	+50.7
Liberal	David Hay	15,278	49.3	−15.6
Independent gain from Liberal		Swing	+50.7	

=== Maroubra ===
1991 New South Wales state election: Maroubra
Party	Candidate	Votes	%	±%
Labor	Bob Carr	17,398	57.3	+3.9
Liberal	Vonnie O'Shea	11,244	37.1	+0.4
Democrats	Andrew Larcos	1,701	5.6	0.0
Total formal votes		30,343	87.9	−8.3
Informal votes		4,169	12.1	+8.3
Turnout		34,512	92.9	
Two-party-preferred result
Labor	Bob Carr	18,094	60.8	+1.4
Liberal	Vonnie O'Shea	11,678	39.2	−1.4
Labor hold		Swing	+1.4	

=== Marrickville ===
1991 New South Wales state election: Marrickville
Party	Candidate	Votes	%	±%
Labor	Andrew Refshauge	15,474	54.8	+7.3
Liberal	Jack Cassimatis	7,040	24.9	+2.3
Greens	Bruce Welch	3,659	13.0	+13.0
Democrats	Peter Hennessy	2,050	7.3	−2.8
Total formal votes		28,223	86.5	−7.8
Informal votes		4,415	13.5	+7.8
Turnout		32,638	89.8	
Two-party-preferred result
Labor	Andrew Refshauge	18,293	69.8	+2.6
Liberal	Jack Cassimatis	7,902	30.2	−2.6
Labor hold		Swing	+2.6	

=== Miranda ===
1991 New South Wales state election: Miranda
Party	Candidate	Votes	%	±%
Liberal	Ron Phillips	18,200	56.9	−2.2
Labor	Hazel Wilson	11,200	35.0	−2.7
Democrats	Lydia Clancy	2,601	8.1	+8.1
Total formal votes		32,001	91.8	−5.3
Informal votes		2,855	8.2	+5.3
Turnout		34,856	94.9	
Two-party-preferred result
Liberal	Ron Phillips	18,841	60.3	+0.1
Labor	Hazel Wilson	12,395	39.7	−0.1
Liberal hold		Swing	+0.1	

=== Monaro ===
1991 New South Wales state election: Monaro
Party	Candidate	Votes	%	±%
National	Peter Cochran	17,397	59.2	+31.7
Labor	Penny Lockwood	9,417	32.0	−4.7
Democrats	Bob Patrech	2,577	8.8	+8.6
Total formal votes		29,391	90.0	−7.3
Informal votes		3,265	10.0	+7.3
Turnout		32,656	92.2	
Two-party-preferred result
National	Peter Cochran	17,977	62.7	+4.9
Labor	Penny Lockwood	10,698	37.3	−4.9
National hold		Swing	+4.9	

=== Moorebank ===
1991 New South Wales state election: Moorebank
Party	Candidate	Votes	%	±%
Labor	Craig Knowles	13,833	45.1	−0.8
Liberal	Tony Pascale	10,129	33.1	−4.9
Independent	Jim Kremmer	3,267	10.7	+10.7
Independent	Lillian Beckett	1,525	5.0	+5.0
Democrats	Julian Connelly	874	2.9	−0.3
Call to Australia	Lindsay Amor	514	1.7	+1.7
Independent	Bryce Regan	505	1.6	+1.6
Total formal votes		30,647	88.3	−7.5
Informal votes		4,071	11.7	+7.5
Turnout		34,718	94.0	
Two-party-preferred result
Labor	Craig Knowles	15,174	54.4	+0.7
Liberal	Tony Pascale	12,724	45.6	−0.7
Labor hold		Swing	+0.7	

=== Mount Druitt ===
1991 New South Wales state election: Mount Druitt
Party	Candidate	Votes	%	±%
Labor	Richard Amery	15,848	54.8	−2.9
Liberal	Michael Sainsbury	8,362	28.9	−9.8
Independent EFF	Joe Bryant	2,095	7.2	+4.2
Call to Australia	Mavis Atha	915	3.2	+3.2
Democrats	Dick Pike	759	2.6	+2.6
Independent	Ivor F	608	2.1	+2.1
Citizens Electoral Council	Gloria Wood	323	1.1	+1.1
Total formal votes		28,910	85.5	−10.4
Informal votes		4,896	14.5	+10.4
Turnout		33,806	93.5	
Two-party-preferred result
Labor	Richard Amery	16,873	63.0	+3.7
Liberal	Michael Sainsbury	9,891	37.0	−3.7
Labor notional hold		Swing	+3.7	

Mount Druitt was a new seat with a notional Labor majority.

=== Murray ===
1991 New South Wales state election: Murray
Party	Candidate	Votes	%	±%
National	Jim Small	23,272	74.4	−1.1
Labor	Mark Kilby	5,048	16.1	−7.9
Democrats	Bernard Gee	1,251	4.0	+4.0
Independent	James Hayes	1,187	3.8	+3.8
Citizens Electoral Council	Edward Harvey	506	1.6	+1.6
Total formal votes		31,264	94.6	−3.4
Informal votes		1,771	5.4	+3.4
Turnout		33,035	90.5	
Two-party-preferred result
National	Jim Small	23,999	81.4	+5.5
Labor	Mark Kilby	5,490	18.6	−5.5
National hold		Swing	+5.5	

=== Murrumbidgee ===
1991 New South Wales state election: Murrumbidgee
Party	Candidate	Votes	%	±%
National	Adrian Cruickshank	15,619	47.7	−18.8
Labor	Ron Anson	9,599	29.3	0.0
Country Residents	Jeanine McRae	3,725	11.4	+11.4
Independent	John Sullivan	3,121	9.5	+9.5
Democrats	Rene Brummans	696	2.1	+2.1
Total formal votes		32,760	93.1	−5.1
Informal votes		2,418	6.9	+5.1
Turnout		35,178	93.8	
Two-party-preferred result
National	Adrian Cruickshank	18,810	61.8	−8.9
Labor	Ron Anson	11,633	38.2	+8.9
National hold		Swing	−8.9	

=== Murwillumbah ===
1991 New South Wales state election: Murwillumbah
Party	Candidate	Votes	%	±%
National	Don Beck	11,196	36.8	−19.1
Labor	Trevor Wilson	9,038	29.7	−6.9
Independent	John Hurley	4,984	16.4	+16.4
Independent	Max Boyd	4,431	14.6	+14.6
Democrats	Ken Nicholson	772	2.5	+2.5
Total formal votes		30,421	95.3	−2.4
Informal votes		1,499	4.7	+2.4
Turnout		31,920	92.4	
Two-party-preferred result
National	Don Beck	14,937	53.1	−6.5
Labor	Trevor Wilson	13,201	46.9	+6.5
National hold		Swing	−6.5	

=== Myall Lakes ===
1991 New South Wales state election: Myall Lakes
Party	Candidate	Votes	%	±%
National	John Turner	19,535	61.4	+0.1
Labor	Frank Rigby	8,711	27.4	+4.1
Democrats	Paul Moritz	1,942	6.1	+2.5
Call to Australia	Terrence Hazell	1,609	5.1	+5.1
Total formal votes		31,797	93.7	−3.7
Informal votes		2,155	6.3	+3.7
Turnout		33,952	94.6	
Two-party-preferred result
National	John Turner	21,086	68.6	−3.7
Labor	Frank Rigby	9,636	31.4	+3.7
National hold		Swing	−3.7	

=== Newcastle ===
1991 New South Wales state election: Newcastle
Party	Candidate	Votes	%	±%
Labor	Bryce Gaudry	15,858	50.1	+10.3
Independent	George Keegan	6,635	21.0	−5.9
Liberal	Colin Cookson	6,533	20.6	+0.3
Democrats	Anne Moulston	1,842	5.8	+5.8
Call to Australia	Jim Kendall	474	1.5	+1.5
Independent	Con Forster	304	1.0	+1.0
Total formal votes		31,646	92.6	−4.4
Informal votes		2,539	7.4	+4.4
Turnout		34,185	94.4	
Two-candidate-preferred result
Labor	Bryce Gaudry	17,274	62.4	+14.7
Independent	George Keegan	10,425	37.6	−14.7
Labor gain from Independent		Swing	+14.7	

=== North Shore ===
1991 New South Wales state election: North Shore
Party	Candidate	Votes	%	±%
Liberal	Phillip Smiles	15,422	51.1	+1.6
Independent	Robyn Read	12,389	41.0	+7.4
Labor	Steven Torpey	2,388	7.9	−7.3
Total formal votes		30,199	94.4	−3.4
Informal votes		1,786	5.6	+3.4
Turnout		31,985	90.3	
Two-candidate-preferred result
Liberal	Phillip Smiles	15,613	52.5	−0.4
Independent	Robyn Read	14,132	47.5	+0.4
Liberal notional hold		Swing	−0.4	

The sitting member was Robyn Read (Independent) however North Shore became a notional Liberal seat as a result of the 1990 redistribution.

=== Northcott ===
1991 New South Wales state election: Northcott
Party	Candidate	Votes	%	±%
Liberal	Bruce Baird	22,066	67.9	−4.9
Labor	Vanessa O'Meara	5,599	17.2	−9.2
Democrats	Kerry Bamford	3,686	11.3	+11.3
Call to Australia	Colin Hornshaw	1,129	3.5	+3.5
Total formal votes		32,480	93.3	−3.7
Informal votes		2,344	6.7	+3.7
Turnout		34,824	94.0	
Two-party-preferred result
Liberal	Bruce Baird	23,420	76.4	+3.2
Labor	Vanessa O'Meara	7,241	23.6	−3.2
Liberal hold		Swing	+3.2	

=== Northern Tablelands ===
1991 New South Wales state election: Northern Tablelands
Party	Candidate	Votes	%	±%
National	Ray Chappell	18,220	54.6	−9.5
Labor	Janice Knight	10,544	31.6	+4.2
Democrats	Fiona Richardson	1,370	4.1	−1.2
Citizens Electoral Council	Rob Taber	1,287	3.9	+3.9
Independent	Peter Worthing	1,220	3.7	+3.7
Independent	Stewart Scott-Irving	740	2.2	+2.2
Total formal votes		33,381	94.1	−3.7
Informal votes		2,083	5.9	+3.7
Turnout		35,464	93.9	
Two-party-preferred result
National	Ray Chappell	19,226	61.5	−7.1
Labor	Janice Knight	12,041	38.5	+7.1
National hold		Swing	−7.1	

=== Orange ===
1991 New South Wales state election: Orange
Party	Candidate	Votes	%	±%
National	Garry West	16,658	50.3	−21.8
Independent	Tim Sullivan	9,922	30.0	+30.0
Labor	Bob Farrell	5,149	15.5	−12.3
Call to Australia	Peter Walls	781	2.4	+2.4
Independent	Tom Rands	612	1.8	+1.8
Total formal votes		33,122	94.6	−3.1
Informal votes		1,901	5.4	+3.1
Turnout		35,023	95.0	
Two-candidate-preferred result
National	Garry West	17,552	55.3	−16.8
Independent	Tim Sullivan	14,181	44.7	+44.7
National hold		Swing	−16.8	

=== Oxley ===
1991 New South Wales state election: Oxley
Party	Candidate	Votes	%	±%
National	Bruce Jeffery	17,896	57.4	−12.2
Labor	Paul Sekfy	10,476	33.6	+5.1
Democrats	Dean Jefferys	2,267	7.3	+5.4
Citizens Electoral Council	Kenneth Robertson	529	1.7	+1.7
Total formal votes		31,168	93.7	−3.9
Informal votes		2,104	6.3	+3.9
Turnout		33,272	94.2	
Two-party-preferred result
National	Bruce Jeffery	18,513	61.5	−9.0
Labor	Paul Sekfy	11,579	38.5	+9.0
National hold		Swing	−9.0	

=== Parramatta ===
1991 New South Wales state election: Parramatta
Party	Candidate	Votes	%	±%
Labor	Andrew Ziolkowski	13,984	44.3	−3.0
Liberal	John Books	13,467	42.6	−1.8
Independent	John Brown	2,407	7.6	+7.6
Democrats	Gail Kerr	1,443	4.6	+0.4
Independent	Cherie Loel	280	0.9	+0.9
Total formal votes		31,581	90.2	−6.4
Informal votes		3,434	9.8	+6.4
Turnout		35,015	93.9	
Two-party-preferred result
Labor	Andrew Ziolkowski	15,914	52.6	+2.1
Liberal	John Books	14,352	47.4	−2.1
Labor notional hold		Swing	+2.1	

The sitting member was John Books (Liberal) however Parramatta became a notional Labor seat as a result of the 1990 redistribution.

=== Peats ===
1991 New South Wales state election: Peats
Party	Candidate	Votes	%	±%
Labor	Tony Doyle	17,690	54.9	+6.1
Liberal	Keith Lavers	10,490	32.6	−1.8
Independent	Pat Harrison	2,579	8.0	−8.8
Democrats	Merv Howlett	1,445	4.5	+4.5
Total formal votes		32,204	92.1	−5.0
Informal votes		2,776	7.9	+5.0
Turnout		34,980	94.8	
Two-party-preferred result
Labor	Tony Doyle	19,040	61.0	+3.7
Liberal	Keith Lavers	12,150	39.0	−3.7
Labor hold		Swing	+3.7	

=== Penrith ===
1991 New South Wales state election: Penrith
Party	Candidate	Votes	%	±%
Labor	Faye Lo Po'	15,086	47.7	+4.0
Liberal	Guy Matheson	12,777	40.4	−2.0
Independent	Betty Bourke	1,543	4.9	+4.9
Democrats	Ivan Metcalfe	1,175	3.7	+3.7
Call to Australia	Brian Grigg	1,075	3.4	−2.2
Total formal votes		31,656	92.7	−3.8
Informal votes		2,492	7.3	+3.8
Turnout		34,148	94.5	
Two-party-preferred result
Labor	Faye Lo Po'	16,606	54.6	+5.9
Liberal	Guy Matheson	13,823	45.4	−5.9
Labor gain from Liberal		Swing	+5.9	

=== Pittwater ===
1991 New South Wales state election: Pittwater
Party	Candidate	Votes	%	±%
Liberal	Jim Longley	20,893	66.3	+10.2
Labor	Garry Sargent	5,515	17.5	+1.2
Democrats	David Plumb	5,108	16.2	+13.5
Total formal votes		31,516	91.2	−5.7
Informal votes		3,036	8.8	+5.7
Turnout		34,552	92.4	
Two-party-preferred result
Liberal	Jim Longley	22,150	73.4	+1.1
Labor	Garry Sargent	8,008	26.6	−1.1
Liberal hold		Swing	+1.1	

=== Port Jackson ===
1991 New South Wales state election: Port Jackson
Party	Candidate	Votes	%	±%
Labor	Sandra Nori	15,510	50.7	+8.3
Independent	Dawn Fraser	5,785	18.9	−4.4
Liberal	Michael Bach	5,285	17.3	−1.7
Greens	Hall Greenland	2,140	7.0	+7.0
Independent	Des Kennedy	867	2.8	+2.8
Democrats	Yvonne Penfold	815	2.7	−0.2
Call to Australia	Bruce Thompson	189	0.6	+0.6
Total formal votes		30,591	93.9	−2.3
Informal votes		1,981	6.1	+2.3
Turnout		32,572	89.4	
Two-candidate-preferred result
Labor	Sandra Nori	18,114	63.7	+13.2
Independent	Dawn Fraser	10,322	36.3	−13.2
Labor notional hold		Swing	+13.2	

Port Jackson was a new seat with a notional Labor majority.

=== Port Macquarie ===
1991 New South Wales state election: Port Macquarie
Party	Candidate	Votes	%	±%
National	Wendy Machin	17,430	54.8	−15.1
Labor	John Murphy	7,172	22.5	−7.2
Independent	Bob Woodlands	5,572	17.5	+17.5
Democrats	Jan Tyrrell	958	3.0	+3.0
Call to Australia	Suzanne Trant-Fischer	700	2.2	+2.2
Total formal votes		31,832	94.5	−3.0
Informal votes		1,866	5.5	+3.0
Turnout		33,698	94.8	
Two-party-preferred result
National	Wendy Machin	19,617	67.7	−2.6
Labor	John Murphy	9,372	32.3	+2.6
National hold		Swing	−2.6	

=== Port Stephens ===
1991 New South Wales state election: Port Stephens
Party	Candidate	Votes	%	±%
Labor	Bob Martin	17,498	54.5	+15.1
Liberal	Lee Mather	9,209	28.7	−8.9
National	Len Roberts	3,665	11.4	+6.4
Democrats	Lance Woods	1,739	5.4	+4.7
Total formal votes		32,111	92.9	−3.9
Informal votes		2,449	7.1	+3.9
Turnout		34,560	95.0	
Two-party-preferred result
Labor	Bob Martin	18,515	60.1	+13.1
Liberal	Lee Mather	12,315	39.9	−13.1
Labor notional gain from Liberal		Swing	+13.1	

Port Stephens became a notional Liberal seat as a result of the 1990 redistribution, however Bob Martin (Labor) retained the seat with an increased margin.

=== Riverstone ===
1991 New South Wales state election: Riverstone
Party	Candidate	Votes	%	±%
Labor	John Aquilina	15,886	51.6	+3.4
Liberal	Allan Green	10,905	35.5	−6.1
Independent	Michael Corbin	2,337	7.6	+7.6
Democrats	Bill Clancy	993	3.2	+3.2
Call to Australia	Royalene Edwards	639	2.1	+2.1
Total formal votes		30,760	89.1	−6.8
Informal votes		3,753	10.9	+6.8
Turnout		34,513	94.8	
Two-party-preferred result
Labor	John Aquilina	16,931	57.5	+4.5
Liberal	Allan Green	12,518	42.5	−4.5
Labor hold		Swing	+4.5	

=== Rockdale ===
1991 New South Wales state election: Rockdale
Party	Candidate	Votes	%	±%
Labor	George Thompson	15,110	50.7	−1.5
Liberal	Peter Johnson	11,859	39.8	+2.4
Democrats	Leslie Wand	1,005	3.4	+3.4
Independent	Sergio Bustamante	969	3.2	+3.2
Independent	Anne Targett	875	2.9	+2.9
Total formal votes		29,818	86.8	−9.4
Informal votes		4,541	13.2	+9.4
Turnout		34,359	94.0	
Two-party-preferred result
Labor	George Thompson	16,350	56.8	+1.6
Liberal	Peter Johnson	12,454	43.2	−1.6
Labor hold		Swing	+1.6	

=== St Marys ===
1991 New South Wales state election: St Marys
Party	Candidate	Votes	%	±%
Labor	Tony Aquilina	18,726	61.1	+6.8
Liberal	Barry Haylock	9,312	30.4	−4.0
Democrats	Suzanne Saunders	2,588	8.5	+8.5
Total formal votes		30,626	89.6	−5.5
Informal votes		3,553	10.4	+5.5
Turnout		34,179	93.4	
Two-party-preferred result
Labor	Tony Aquilina	19,664	66.4	+6.9
Liberal	Barry Haylock	9,941	33.6	−6.9
Labor notional hold		Swing	+6.9	

St Mary's was a new seat with a notional Labor majority.

=== Smithfield ===
1991 New South Wales state election: Smithfield
Party	Candidate	Votes	%	±%
Labor	Carl Scully	15,473	52.1	+0.1
Liberal	Bob Robertson	10,053	33.8	−6.1
Independent	Joe Morizzi	3,298	11.1	+11.1
Call to Australia	Elias Hammo	894	3.0	+1.7
Total formal votes		29,718	83.9	−11.0
Informal votes		5,691	16.1	+11.0
Turnout		35,409	94.9	
Two-party-preferred result
Labor	Carl Scully	16,260	57.0	+1.9
Liberal	Bob Robertson	12,279	43.0	−1.9
Labor hold		Swing	+1.9	

=== South Coast ===
1991 New South Wales state election: South Coast
Party	Candidate	Votes	%	±%
Independent	John Hatton	15,327	51.4	+11.2
Liberal	Graeme Hurst	8,499	28.5	−5.5
Labor	Veronica Hursted	5,199	17.4	−1.6
Call to Australia	Neil McLean	815	2.7	−0.5
Total formal votes		29,840	93.5	−4.5
Informal votes		2,071	6.5	+4.5
Turnout		31,911	93.5	
Two-candidate-preferred result
Independent	John Hatton	19,416	68.3	+8.2
Liberal	Graeme Hurst	9,028	31.7	−8.2
Independent hold		Swing	+8.2	

=== Southern Highlands ===
1991 New South Wales state election: Southern Highlands
Party	Candidate	Votes	%	±%
Liberal	John Fahey	15,000	48.1	+20.1
Labor	Ken Sullivan	11,740	37.6	+9.6
Democrats	Susan Nagy	2,919	9.4	+5.7
Call to Australia	Wal Tennikoff	1,547	5.0	+5.0
Total formal votes		31,206	91.8	−5.5
Informal votes		2,784	8.2	+5.5
Turnout		33,990	93.7	
Two-party-preferred result
Liberal	John Fahey	16,859	56.4	−10.5
Labor	Ken Sullivan	13,009	43.6	+10.5
Liberal hold		Swing	−10.5	

=== Strathfield ===
1991 New South Wales state election: Strathfield
Party	Candidate	Votes	%	±%
Liberal	Paul Zammit	16,593	55.4	+3.4
Labor	Michael Costa	10,942	36.5	−0.4
Democrats	Marjorie Woodman	2,426	8.1	+4.3
Total formal votes		29,961	88.2	−7.6
Informal votes		4,022	11.8	+7.6
Turnout		33,983	93.1	
Two-party-preferred result
Liberal	Paul Zammit	17,305	59.3	+1.4
Labor	Michael Costa	11,901	40.7	−1.4

=== Sutherland ===
1991 New South Wales state election: Sutherland
Party	Candidate	Votes	%	±%
Liberal	Chris Downy	16,406	49.3	−0.1
Labor	Genevieve Rankin	13,127	39.4	+1.7
Independent	Lynette Farmer	1,997	6.0	+6.0
Democrats	June Young	1,749	5.3	+3.5
Total formal votes		33,279	93.8	−4.1
Informal votes		2,211	6.2	+4.1
Turnout		35,490	95.6	
Two-party-preferred result
Liberal	Chris Downy	17,244	53.0	−0.9
Labor	Genevieve Rankin	15,262	47.0	+0.9
Liberal hold		Swing	−0.9	

=== Swansea ===
1991 New South Wales state election: Swansea
Party	Candidate	Votes	%	±%
Labor	Don Bowman	14,658	45.6	+6.6
Independent	Ivan Welsh	7,745	24.1	−11.9
Liberal	Laurie Coghlan	5,888	18.3	−3.8
Democrats	Michael Reckenberg	1,617	5.0	+2.2
Independent	John Selway	1,400	4.4	+4.4
Call to Australia	Ivan Morrow	629	2.0	+2.0
Independent	Harold Pyke	195	0.6	+0.6
Total formal votes		32,132	92.6	−4.5
Informal votes		2,579	7.4	+4.5
Turnout		34,711	94.9	
Two-candidate-preferred result
Labor	Don Bowman	16,539	56.4	+14.0
Independent	Ivan Welsh	12,797	43.6	−14.0
Labor gain from Independent		Swing	+14.0	

=== Tamworth ===
1991 New South Wales state election: Tamworth
Party	Candidate	Votes	%	±%
Independent	Tony Windsor	12,097	36.2	+36.2
National	David Briggs	10,647	31.9	−37.6
Labor	Christine Robertson	5,220	15.6	−6.6
Independent	David Evans	4,718	14.1	+14.1
Democrats	Glen Hausfield	708	2.1	−5.4
Total formal votes		33,390	95.7	−2.3
Informal votes		1,490	4.3	+2.3
Turnout		34,880	95.4	
Two-candidate-preferred result
Independent	Tony Windsor	18,602	59.8	+59.8
National	David Briggs	12,503	40.2	−34.8
Independent gain from National		Swing	+59.8	

=== The Entrance ===
1991 New South Wales state election: The Entrance
Party	Candidate	Votes	%	±%
Liberal	Bob Graham	14,356	46.1	−5.8
Labor	Grant McBride	13,415	43.1	−3.5
Democrats	Lynn Sawyer	1,825	5.9	+5.3
Independent	Tony Irving	1,516	4.9	+4.9
Total formal votes		31,112	91.7	−5.0
Informal votes		2,801	8.3	+5.0
Turnout		33,913	93.5	
Two-party-preferred result
Liberal	Bob Graham	15,165	50.2	−2.6
Labor	Grant McBride	15,049	49.8	+2.6
Liberal hold		Swing	−2.6	

- This result was overturned by the Court of Disputed Returns and a by-election was called, where Labor won.

=== The Hills ===
1991 New South Wales state election: The Hills
Party	Candidate	Votes	%	±%
Liberal	Tony Packard	19,860	62.5	−16.0
Independent	Roy Potter	6,619	20.8	+20.8
Labor	Julie Kanaghines	3,945	12.4	−9.1
Democrats	Roger Posgate	1,346	4.2	+4.2
Total formal votes		31,770	93.8	−3.1
Informal votes		2,101	6.2	+3.1
Turnout		33,871	93.4	
Two-candidate-preferred result
Liberal	Tony Packard	20,547	67.4	−11.1
Independent	Roy Potter	9,950	32.6	+32.6
Liberal hold		Swing	−11.1	

=== Upper Hunter ===
1991 New South Wales state election: Upper Hunter
Party	Candidate	Votes	%	±%
National	George Souris	19,262	58.2	−4.5
Labor	Pat Baks	10,554	31.9	+0.6
Country Residents	Robert Duff	2,177	6.6	+6.6
Citizens Electoral Council	Margaret Hawkins	1,115	3.4	+3.4
Total formal votes		33,108	93.0	−4.6
Informal votes		2,511	7.0	+4.6
Turnout		35,619	94.9	
Two-party-preferred result
National	George Souris	20,661	64.7	−2.5
Labor	Pat Baks	11,274	35.3	+2.5
National hold		Swing	−2.5	

=== Vaucluse ===
1991 New South Wales state election: Vaucluse
Party	Candidate	Votes	%	±%
Liberal	Michael Yabsley	16,876	55.1	−9.4
Labor	James Dupree	5,337	17.4	−14.8
Independent	Rose Watson	4,444	14.5	+14.5
Greens	Geoff Ash	1,509	4.9	+4.9
Democrats	Victoria Resch	1,050	3.4	+0.1
Independent	Yvonne Jayawardena	1,022	3.3	+3.3
Independent	Tony Waldron	412	1.3	+1.3
Total formal votes		30,650	90.7	−5.7
Informal votes		3,128	9.3	+5.7
Turnout		33,778	90.2	
Two-candidate-preferred result
Liberal	Michael Yabsley	17,862	63.0	−3.2
Independent	Rose Watson	10,475	37.0	+37.0
Liberal hold		Swing	−3.2	

=== Wagga Wagga ===
1991 New South Wales state election: Wagga Wagga
Party	Candidate	Votes	%	±%
Liberal	Joe Schipp	19,031	65.8	−1.7
Labor	Geoff Burch	9,886	34.2	+4.9
Total formal votes		28,917	85.1	−12.8
Informal votes		5,064	14.9	+12.8
Turnout		33,981	93.8	
Liberal hold		Swing	−4.5	

=== Wakehurst ===
1991 New South Wales state election: Wakehurst
Party	Candidate	Votes	%	±%
Liberal	Brad Hazzard	17,161	55.3	+2.4
Labor	Anne Purcell	8,077	26.0	−6.4
Independent	Tim Maguire	3,435	11.1	+11.1
Democrats	Richard Hill	2,336	7.5	+7.4
Total formal votes		31,009	90.8	−5.6
Informal votes		3,155	9.2	+5.6
Turnout		34,164	92.1	
Two-party-preferred result
Liberal	Brad Hazzard	18,550	62.7	+3.2
Labor	Anne Purcell	11,048	37.3	−3.2
Liberal hold		Swing	+3.2	

=== Wallsend ===
1991 New South Wales state election: Wallsend
Party	Candidate	Votes	%	±%
Labor	John Mills	17,724	56.0	−0.3
Liberal	Philip Laver	9,438	29.8	−9.0
Democrats	Judith Smyth	2,983	9.4	+9.4
Call to Australia	John Hor	1,522	4.8	+4.8
Total formal votes		31,667	89.8	−6.5
Informal votes		3,592	10.2	+6.5
Turnout		35,259	95.3	
Two-party-preferred result
Labor	John Mills	18,850	63.2	+5.0
Liberal	Philip Laver	10,970	36.8	−5.0
Labor hold		Swing	+5.0	

=== Waratah ===
1991 New South Wales state election: Waratah
Party	Candidate	Votes	%	±%
Labor	John Price	19,401	65.1	+6.1
Liberal	Mark Booth	7,299	24.5	−8.2
Independent	Milton Caine	2,105	7.1	+7.1
Call to Australia	Stuart Edser	1,008	3.4	+3.4
Total formal votes		29,813	88.3	−7.7
Informal votes		3,968	11.7	+7.7
Turnout		33,781	95.5	
Two-party-preferred result
Labor	John Price	20,258	71.0	+9.3
Liberal	Mark Booth	8,293	29.0	−9.3
Labor hold		Swing	−9.3	

=== Willoughby ===
1991 New South Wales state election: Willoughby
Party	Candidate	Votes	%	±%
Liberal	Peter Collins	18,247	57.4	−9.2
Independent	Louise Weingarth	7,942	25.0	+25.0
Labor	Daniel Reiss	4,010	12.6	−14.1
Democrats	Mary Harnett	903	2.8	+2.8
Call to Australia	Rosemary Moore	699	2.2	+2.2
Total formal votes		31,801	93.1	−3.4
Informal votes		2,374	6.9	+3.4
Turnout		34,175	91.2	
Two-candidate-preferred result
Liberal	Peter Collins	18,777	61.9	−8.3
Independent	Louise Weingarth	11,536	38.1	+38.1
Liberal notional hold		Swing	−8.3	

Willoughby was a new seat with a notional Liberal majority.

=== Wollongong ===
1991 New South Wales state election: Wollongong
Party	Candidate	Votes	%	±%
Labor	Gerry Sullivan	15,196	50.2	+11.4
Independent	Frank Arkell	8,971	29.7	−10.0
Liberal	Mick Lucke	3,180	10.5	−1.7
Greens	Steve Brigham	1,600	5.3	+5.3
Democrats	April Sampson-Kelly	894	3.0	+3.0
Call to Australia	Valdis Smidlers	402	1.3	+1.3
Total formal votes		30,243	87.6	−7.8
Informal votes		4,288	12.4	+7.8
Turnout		34,531	93.3	
Two-candidate-preferred result
Labor	Gerry Sullivan	16,125	58.6	+12.2
Independent	Frank Arkell	11,390	41.4	−12.2
Labor gain from Independent		Swing	+12.2	

=== Wyong ===
1991 New South Wales state election: Wyong
Party	Candidate	Votes	%	±%
Labor	Paul Crittenden	16,392	53.1	−0.2
Liberal	Rick Walton	11,527	37.3	−9.4
Democrats	Jan Watts	1,283	4.2	+4.2
Independent	Phil Kenny	1,094	3.5	+3.5
Independent	Gordon Craig	586	1.9	+1.9
Total formal votes		30,882	92.3	−4.2
Informal votes		2,570	7.7	+4.2
Turnout		33,452	94.2	
Two-party-preferred result
Labor	Paul Crittenden	17,613	59.0	+5.7
Liberal	Rick Walton	12,229	41.0	−5.7
Labor hold		Swing	+5.7	

== See also ==
- Results of the 1991 New South Wales state election (Legislative Council)
- Candidates of the 1991 New South Wales state election
- Members of the New South Wales Legislative Assembly, 1991–1995
