= Candidates of the 1991 New South Wales state election =

This is a list of candidates of the 1991 New South Wales state election. The election was held on 25 May 1991.

== Retiring members ==
=== Labor ===
- Bob Christie MLA (Seven Hills)
- Michael Cleary MLA (Coogee)
- Merv Hunter MLA (Lake Macquarie)
- Bill Lovelee MLA (Bass Hill)
- Harry Moore MLA (Wyong)
- Barrie Unsworth MLA (Rockdale)
- Allan Walsh MLA (Maitland)
- George Brenner MLC
- Barney French MLC
- Fred Hankinson MLC
- Mick Ibbett MLC (Note: Would have continued as an MLC until the next election, due in 1995, however the approval of the 1991 referendum held at the same time as this election meant that, as they were not in the first 12 elected at the 1984 Legislative Council election, they retired.)
- Ken Reed MLC

=== Liberal ===
- John Booth MLA (Wakehurst)
- John Dowd MLA (Lane Cove)
- Neil Pickard MLA (Hornsby)
- Guy Yeomans MLA (Hurstville)
- John Matthews MLC

=== National ===
- Noel Park MLA (Tamworth)
- Roger Wotton MLA (Castlereagh)
- Jack Doohan MLC
- Judy Jakins MLC
- Richard Killen MLC

=== Independent ===
- Marie Bignold MLC — elected as Call to Australia

== Legislative Assembly ==
Sitting members are shown in bold text. Successful candidates are highlighted in the relevant colour. Where there is possible confusion, an asterisk (*) is also used.

Electorate	Held by	Labor candidate	Coalition candidate	Democrats candidate	CTA candidate	Other candidates
Albury	Liberal	Peter Rowe	**Ian Glachan** (Lib)		Fred Showler	John Kerr (CEC)
Ashfield	Labor	**Paul Whelan**	Ralph Buono (Lib)	Robert Dawson	Clay Wilson	Ron Poulsen (Ind); Paul Wakim (Ind)
Auburn	Labor	**Peter Nagle**	Fahmi Hussain (Lib)	Marcus Weyland		Ed Dogramaci (Ind)
Badgerys Creek	Liberal	Diane Beamer	**Anne Cohen** (Lib)			Ray Allan (Ind); David Bryant (EFF)
Ballina	National	Maureen Lane	**Don Page** (Nat)	Andrew Mignot	Alan Sims	Fast Bucks (Ind)
Bankstown	Labor	**Doug Shedden**	Paul Barrett (Lib)			
Barwon	National	Steve Funnell	**Wal Murray** (Nat)	Jenni Birch		Bevan O'Regan (CRP)
Bathurst	Liberal	Mick Clough	**David Berry** (Lib)	John Merkel		Mal Rich (CRP)
Baulkham Hills	Liberal	Bill Pinkstone	**Wayne Merton** (Lib)	Brian Shoebridge		
Bega	Liberal	Ian Marshall	**Russell Smith**	Denise Redmond		
Blacktown	Labor	**Pam Allan**	Ray Morris (Lib)	Diana Shanks	John Jerrow	Con Constantine (Ind); Paul Georiadis (CEC)
Bligh	Independent	Anne-Maree Whitaker	Carol Dance (Lib)			**Clover Moore** (Ind)
Blue Mountains	Liberal	Jim Angel	**Barry Morris** (Lib)	Steve Bailey	Shirley Grigg	Paul Arico (CRP); Bob Kennedy (Ind); William Mulcahy (Ind); Colin Slade (Ind)
Broken Hill	National	**Bill Beckroge**	David Atkins (Lib); Peter Laird (Nat)	Keith Ridley		Mary Casey-Marshall (CRP); George Diamantes (Ind)
Bulli	Labor	**Ian McManus**	Cheryl Hill (Lib)	Greg O'Brien	Colin Scott	Carole Medcalf (Grn)
Burrinjuck	Liberal	George Martin	**Alby Schultz** (Lib)			
Cabramatta	Labor	**John Newman**	Bill Karagiannis (Lib)	Sam McLeod		Maria Heggie (Ind); Phuong Ngo (Ind); Albert Ranse (Ind); Anthony Thai (Ind)
Camden	Liberal	**Peter Primrose**	Liz Kernohan (Lib)			Karen Willis (Ind)
Campbelltown	Labor	**Michael Knight**	Charlie Lynn (Lib)	Sharon Kellett		
Canterbury	Labor	**Kevin Moss**	Carlo Favorito (Lib)	Garry Dalrymple		
Cessnock	Liberal	Stan Neilly	**Bob Roberts** (Lib)	Denis Rothwell		Jim White (Ind)
Charlestown	Labor	**Richard Face**	Judith Lloyd (Lib)	Graham Pritchard	Robin Budge	Steve Owens (Ind)
Clarence	National	Olive Boundy	**Ian Causley** (Nat)	Martin Frohlich	Doug Williams	John Stanmore (Ind)
Coffs Harbour	National	Bruce Clarke	**Andrew Fraser** (Nat)	Sue Arnold		Evalds Erglis (Ind); May Southgate (Ind)
Coogee	Labor	**Ernie Page**	**Allan Andrews** (Lib)	Peter Feltis		Claude Danzey (Ind); Jack Dillon (Ind); Charles Matthews (Ind)
Cronulla	Liberal	Tony Brownlow	**Malcolm Kerr** (Lib)	Terri Richardson		
Davidson	Liberal	Ian Faulks	**Terry Metherell** (Lib)	Felicity Boyd		
Drummoyne	Liberal	**John Murray**	Michael Cantali (Lib)	Julien Droulers		Gillian Lewis (Ind); Robert Maddrell (Ind); Bruce Threlfo (Grn)
Dubbo	National	Owen Evans	**Gerry Peacocke** (Nat)	Ken Graham	Ian Bones	
East Hills	Labor	**Pat Rogan**	Max Parker (Lib)	Robert Springett		David Sparkes (Ind)
Eastwood	Liberal	John Quessy	**Andrew Tink** (Lib)	Chris Dunkerley		Zero-Population-Growth (Ind)
Ermington	Liberal	Margaret Blaxell	**Michael Photios** (Lib)	Cameron Ward		
Fairfield	Labor	**Geoff Irwin**	John Natoli (Lib)	Chad Zadourian	Keith Smith	
Georges River	Liberal	Philip Sansom	**Terry Griffiths** (Lib)	Paul Kekel		Fred Cavanagh (Ind); Ross Green (Ind); Brian Meyer (Ind); Bill Pickering (Ind)
Gladesville	Liberal	John Watkins	**Ivan Petch** (Lib)	Noel Plumb	Robyn Peebles	
Gordon	Liberal	Ian Latham	**Tim Moore** (Lib)	Michelle Herfurth	John Swan	
Gosford	Liberal	Stephen Goodwin	**Chris Hartcher** (Lib)	Andrew Penfold	Eric Trezise	Robert Bell (Ind)
Granville	Labor	**Kim Yeadon**	Les Osmond (Lib)	Clinton Reynolds	Keith Barron	Peter Sayegh (Ind)
Hawkesbury	Liberal	Bob Benson	**Kevin Rozzoli** (Lib)	Michael Antrum		Carl Bazeley (Ind); Warwick Gummerson (CEC); Richard Mezinec (Ind)
Heffron	Labor	**Deirdre Grusovin**	John Paterson	Eamon Quinn		Mark Berriman (Grn)
Hurstville	Labor	Morris Iemma	**Phil White** (Lib)	Paul Terrett		Tony Wild (Ind)
Illawarra	Labor	**Terry Rumble**	Dennis Owen (Lib)	Neil Smith	Brian Hughes	
Keira	Labor	**Col Markham**	David Moulds (Lib)	Alan Davidson	Robert O'Neill	
Kiama	Labor	**Bob Harrison**	Phillip Motbey (Lib)	Kerry Sharpe	Glen Ryan	
Kogarah	Labor	**Brian Langton**	Pat O'Brien (Lib)	John Mukai		
Ku-ring-gai	Liberal	Sue Deane	**Nick Greiner** (Lib)	Ted Roach	Robert Taylor	Mick Gallagher (Ind)
Lachlan	National	Peter Gordon	**Ian Armstrong** (Nat)	Neil Bartlett		Peter Mallon (CRP); Colin Wilson (Ind)
Lake Macquarie	Labor	Jeff Hunter	Cameron Phillips (Lib)	Lyla Koelink	Margaret Neale	Alan Davis (Ind)
Lakemba	Labor	**Wes Davoren**	Karl Tartak (Lib)	Amelia Newman		Michael Hawatt (Ind)
Lane Cove	Liberal	Luther Weate	Kerry Chikarovski (Lib)	Simon Disney		
Lismore	National	Janelle Saffin	**Bill Rixon** (Nat)	Anne Simons		Bob Hopkins (Ind); Joy Wallace (Grn)
Liverpool	Labor	**Peter Anderson**	Gloria Arora (Lib)	Susan Robinson		Nick Beams (SLL); Colin Harrington (Ind); Albert Perish (CEC)
Londonderry	Labor	**Paul Gibson**	Cheryle Simons (Lib)			
Maitland	Liberal	Tony Keating	Peter Blackmore (Lib)	Malcolm Martin	Tom Toogood	Bob Horne (Ind); Pat Hughes (Ind)
Manly	Liberal	Ivan Hurwitz	**David Hay** (Lib)	Jane King		Peter Macdonald (Ind)
Maroubra	Labor	**Bob Carr**	Vonnie O'Shea (Lib)	Andrew Larcos		
Marrickville	Labor	**Andrew Refshauge**	Jack Cassimatis (Lib)	Peter Hennessy		Bruce Welch (Grn)
Miranda	Liberal	Hazel Wilson	**Ron Phillips** (Lib)	Lydia Clancy		
Monaro	National	Penny Lockwood	**Peter Cochran** (Nat)	Bob Patrech		
Moorebank	Labor	**Craig Knowles**	Tony Pascale (Lib)	Julian Connelly	Lindsay Amor	Lillian Beckett (Ind); Jim Kremmer (Ind); Bryce Regan (Ind)
Mount Druitt	Labor	**Richard Amery**	Michael Sainsbury (Lib)	Dick Pike	Mavis Atha	Joe Bryant (EFF); Ivor F (Ind); Gloria Wood (CEC)
Murray	National	Mark Kilby	**Jim Small** (Nat)	Bernard Gee		Edward Harvey (CEC); James Hayes (Ind)
Murrumbidgee	National	Ron Anson	**Adrian Cruickshank** (Nat)	Rene Brummans		Jeanine McRae (CRP); John Sullivan (Ind)
Murwillumbah	National	Trevor Wilson	**Don Beck** (Nat)	Ken Nicholson		Max Boyd (Ind); John Hurley (Ind)
Myall Lakes	National	Frank Rigby	**John Turner** (Nat)	Paul Moritz	Terrence Hazell	
Newcastle	Independent	Bryce Gaudry	Colin Cookson (Lib)	Anne Moulston	Jim Kendall	Con Forster (Ind); **George Keegan** (Ind)
Northcott	Liberal	Vanessa O'Meara	**Bruce Baird** (Lib)	Kerry Bamford	Colin Hornshaw	
Northern Tablelands	National	Janice Knight	**Ray Chappell** (Nat)	Fiona Richardson		Stewart Scott-Irving (Ind); Rob Taber (CEC); Peter Worthing (Ind)
North Shore	Independent	Steven Torpey	**Phillip Smiles** (Lib)			**Robyn Read** (Ind)
Orange	National	Bob Farrell	**Garry West** (Nat)		Peter Walls	Tom Rands (Ind); Tim Sullivan (Ind)
Oxley	National	Paul Sekfy	**Bruce Jeffery** (Nat)	Dean Jefferys		Kenneth Robertson (CEC)
Parramatta	Labor	Andrew Ziolkowski	**John Books** (Lib)	Gail Kerr		John Brown (Ind); Cherie Loel (MGT)
Peats	Labor	**Tony Doyle**	Keith Lavers (Lib)	Merv Howlett		Pat Harrison (Ind)
Penrith	Liberal	Faye Lo Po'	**Guy Matheson** (Lib)	Ivan Metcalfe	Brian Grigg	Betty Bourke (Ind)
Pittwater	Liberal	Garry Sargent	**Jim Longley** (Lib)	David Plumb		
Port Jackson	Labor	**Sandra Nori**	Michael Bach (Lib)	Yvonne Penfold	Bruce Thompson	**Dawn Fraser** (Ind); Hall Greenland (Grn); Des Kennedy (Ind)
Port Macquarie	National	John Murphy	**Wendy Machin** (Nat)	Jan Tyrrell	Suzanne Trant-Fischer	Bob Woodlands (Ind)
Port Stephens	Liberal	**Bob Martin**	Lee Mather (Lib); Len Roberts (Nat)	Lance Woods		
Riverstone	Labor	**John Aquilina**	Allan Green (Lib)	Bill Clancy	Royalene Edwards	Michael Corbin (Ind)
Rockdale	Labor	George Thompson	Peter Johnson (Lib)	Leslie Wand		Sergio Bustamante (Ind); Anne Targett (Ind)
St Marys	Labor	**Tony Aquilina**	Barry Haylock (Lib)	Suzanne Saunders		
Smithfield	Labor	**Carl Scully**	Bob Robertson (Lib)		Elias Hammo	Joe Morizzi (Ind)
South Coast	Independent	Veronica Husted	Graeme Hurst (Lib)		Neil McLean	**John Hatton** (Ind)
Southern Highlands	Liberal	Ken Sullivan	**John Fahey** (Lib)	Susan Nagy	Wal Tennikoff	
Strathfield	Liberal	Michael Costa	**Paul Zammit** (Lib)	Marjorie Woodman		
Sutherland	Liberal	Genevieve Rankin	**Chris Downy** (Lib)	June Young		Lynette Farmer (Ind)
Swansea	Independent	Don Bowman	Laurie Coghlan (Lib)	Michael Reckenberg	Ivan Morrow	Harold Pyke (Ind); John Selway (Ind); **Ivan Welsh** (Ind)
Tamworth	National	Christine Robertson	David Briggs (Nat)	Glen Hausfeld		David Evans (Ind)
Tamworth	National	Christine Robertson	David Briggs (Nat)	Glen Hausfeld		Tony Windsor (Ind)
The Entrance	Liberal	Grant McBride	**Bob Graham** (Lib)	Lynn Sawyer		Tony Irving
The Hills	Liberal	Julie Kanaghines	**Tony Packard** (Lib)	Roger Posgate		Roy Potter (Ind)
Upper Hunter	National	Pat Baks	**George Souris** (Nat)			Robert Duff (CRP); Margaret Hawkins (CEC)
Vaucluse	Liberal	James Dupree	**Michael Yabsley** (Lib)	Victoria Resch		Geoff Ash (Grn); Yvonne Jayawardena (Ind); Tony Waldron (Ind); Rose Watson (Ind)
Wagga Wagga	Liberal	Geoff Burch	**Joe Schipp** (Lib)			
Wakehurst	Liberal	Anne Purcell	Brad Hazzard (Lib)	Richard Hill		Tim Maguire (Ind)
Wallsend	Labor	**John Mills**	Philip Laver (Lib)	Judith Smyth	John Hor	
Waratah	Labor	**John Price**	Mark Booth (Lib)		Stuart Edser	Milton Caine (Ind)
Willoughby	Liberal	Daniel Reiss	**Peter Collins** (Lib)	Mary Harnett	Rosemary Moore	Louise Weingarth (Ind)
Wollongong	Independent	Gerry Sullivan	Mick Lucke (Lib)	April Sampson-Kelly	Valdis Smidlers	**Frank Arkell** (Ind); Steve Brigham (Grn)
Wyong	Labor	Paul Crittenden	Rick Walton (Lib)	Jan Watts		Gordon Craig (Ind); Phil Kenny (Ind)

== Legislative Council ==
Sitting members are shown in bold text. Tickets that elected at least one MLC are highlighted in the relevant colour. Successful candidates are identified by an asterisk (*).

Labor candidates	Coalition candidates	Democrats candidates	CTA candidates	Greens candidates	EFF/GP/CEC candidates
1. **Jack Hallam***; 2. **Jeff Shaw***; 3. **Bryan Vaughan***; 4. Meredith Burgmann*; 5. **Franca Arena***; 6. Jan Burnswoods*; 7. Eddie Obeid; 8. Tony Kelly; 9. Graham Freudenberg; 10. Hatton Kwok	1. **Ted Pickering*** (Lib); 2. Robert Webster* (Nat); 3. **Max Willis*** (Lib); 4. Patricia Forsythe* (Lib); 5. Doug Moppett* (Nat); 6. John Ryan* (Lib); 7. Jenny Gardiner* (Nat); 8. Tony Gentile (Lib); 9. Marilyn Pidgeon (Lib); 10. Ian Brown (Lib)	1. **Elisabeth Kirkby***; 2. Jonathan King; 3. Ray Griffiths; 4. Meg Sampson	1. **Fred Nile***; 2. Beville Varidel; 3. Bruce Coleman; 4. Peter Walker; 5. John Everingham	1. Ian Cohen; 2. David Nerlich	1. Eddie Azzopardi (EFF); 2. Robert Clarke (GP); 3. Paul Galea; 4. Leone Hay (CEC)
CRP candidates	NTI candidates	Bignold candidates	Group E candidates	Group I candidates	Ungrouped candidates
1. William Gilmore; 2. Desmond Ayres; 3. John Kember	1. Ray Fardell; 2. Mark Findlay	1. Alicia Bignold; 2. Brett Hartley; 3. Christine Smith; 4. Nancy Malcolm	1. Andy Hart; 2. Paul Wilton; 3. George Vitanza; 4. Greg Hirst	1. Patricia Poulos; 2. John Holley	Lord Rolo; Tony Galati; John Hegarty; John Kouroupakis

== See also ==
- Members of the New South Wales Legislative Assembly, 1991–1995
- Members of the New South Wales Legislative Council, 1991–1995
