= Electoral results for the district of The Hills =

Election results for The Hills, New South Wales, Australia

The Hills, an electoral district of the Legislative Assembly in the Australian state of New South Wales, was created in 1962 and abolished in 2007.

Election	Member	Party
1962	Max Ruddock	Liberal
1966	Max Ruddock	Liberal
1968	Max Ruddock	Liberal
1971	Max Ruddock	Liberal
1973	Max Ruddock	Liberal
1976	Max Ruddock	Liberal
1976 by	Fred Caterson	Liberal
1978	Fred Caterson	Liberal
1981	Fred Caterson	Liberal
1984	Fred Caterson	Liberal
1988	Fred Caterson	Liberal
1990 by	Tony Packard	Liberal
1991	Tony Packard	Liberal
1993 by	Michael Richardson	Liberal
1988	Michael Richardson	Liberal
1988	Michael Richardson	Liberal
1988	Michael Richardson	Liberal

== Election results ==
=== Elections in the 2000s ===
==== 2003 ====
2003 New South Wales state election: The Hills
Party	Candidate	Votes	%	±%
Liberal	Michael Richardson	25,574	50.4	−0.7
Labor	Anthony Ellard	14,488	28.6	+3.3
Greens	Jocelyn Howden	3,289	6.5	+3.8
Independent	Rob Stanton	2,368	4.7	+4.7
Christian Democrats	Ken Gregory	2,293	4.5	−0.8
Unity	Robert McLeod	1,441	2.8	−1.2
Against Further Immigration	Albert Dowman	650	1.3	+0.3
Democrats	Kamran Keshavarz Talebi	619	1.2	−5.7
Total formal votes		50,722	98.0	+0.2
Informal votes		1,041	2.0	−0.2
Turnout		51,763	92.2	
Two-party-preferred result
Liberal	Michael Richardson	27,536	61.6	−3.1
Labor	Anthony Ellard	17,174	38.4	+3.1
Liberal hold		Swing	−3.1	

=== Elections in the 1990s ===
==== 1999 ====
1999 New South Wales state election: The Hills
Party	Candidate	Votes	%	±%
Liberal	Michael Richardson	21,954	51.1	−17.7
Labor	George Houssos	10,876	25.3	+4.5
Democrats	Helen McAuliffe	2,963	6.9	+0.5
Christian Democrats	Ken Gregory	2,262	5.3	+5.3
Unity	Stephanie Chan	1,734	4.0	+4.0
One Nation	Anthony Fitzpatrick	1,606	3.7	+3.7
Greens	Claudine Chung	1,178	2.7	+2.7
Against Further Immigration	Shaar Baker	423	1.0	+0.4
Total formal votes		42,996	97.8	+1.6
Informal votes		974	2.2	−1.6
Turnout		43,970	93.0	
Two-party-preferred result
Liberal	Michael Richardson	24,352	64.7	−10.0
Labor	George Houssos	13,300	35.3	+10.0
Liberal hold		Swing	−10.0	

==== 1995 ====
1995 New South Wales state election: The Hills
Party	Candidate	Votes	%	±%
Liberal	Michael Richardson	26,126	69.1	+6.6
Labor	David Brooks	7,546	19.9	+7.5
Democrats	David Baggs	2,564	6.8	+2.5
Independent	Tony Pettitt	1,590	4.2	+4.2
Total formal votes		37,826	96.1	+2.3
Informal votes		1,521	3.9	−2.3
Turnout		39,347	93.7	
Two-party-preferred result
Liberal	Michael Richardson	27,564	75.3	+7.9
Labor	David Brooks	9,038	24.7	+24.7
Liberal hold		Swing	+7.9	

==== 1993 by-election ====
1993 The Hills by-election Saturday 28 August
Party	Candidate	Votes	%	±%
Liberal	Michael Richardson	19,418	60.8	−1.7
Independent	Roy Potter	6,466	20.3	−0.6
Independent	David Baggs	1,685	5.3	
Call to Australia	Bruce Coleman	1,375	4.3	
Independent	Mick Gallagher	1,231	3.9	
Independent	Ruth Rothery	677	2.1	
Independent	Tony Pettitt	414	1.3	
Independent	Louis Solomons	313	1.0	
Independent	Ronald Feiner	189	0.6	
Independent	Ivor F	80	0.3	
Independent	Norman Hooper	75	0.2	
Total formal votes		31,923	97.3	
Informal votes		886	2.7	
Turnout		32,809	81.3	
Two-candidate-preferred result
Liberal	Michael Richardson	20,184	69.0	+1.6
Independent	Roy Potter	9,083	31.0	−1.6
Liberal hold		Swing	+1.6	

Tony Packard (Liberal) resigned.

==== 1991 ====
1991 New South Wales state election: The Hills
Party	Candidate	Votes	%	±%
Liberal	Tony Packard	19,860	62.5	−16.0
Independent	Roy Potter	6,619	20.8	+20.8
Labor	Julie Kanaghines	3,945	12.4	−9.1
Democrats	Roger Posgate	1,346	4.2	+4.2
Total formal votes		31,770	93.8	−3.1
Informal votes		2,101	6.2	+3.1
Turnout		33,871	93.4	
Two-candidate-preferred result
Liberal	Tony Packard	20,547	67.4	−11.1
Independent	Roy Potter	9,950	32.6	+32.6
Liberal hold		Swing	−11.1	

==== 1990 by-election ====
1990 The Hills by-election Saturday 1 September
Party	Candidate	Votes	%	±%
Liberal	Tony Packard	14,633	49.9	−26.0
Independent	Roy Potter	6,013	20.5	
Labor	Lenore Craven	4,228	14.4	−9.7
Democrats	Michael Antrum	1,712	5.8	
Total formal votes		29,327	98.2	
Informal votes		527	1.8	
Turnout		29,854	81.6	
Two-party-preferred result
Liberal	Tony Packard	15,741	57.3	−18.5
Independent	Roy Potter	11,713	42.7	
Liberal hold		Swing	−18.5	

Fred Caterson (Liberal) resigned.

=== Elections in the 1980s ===
==== 1988 ====
1988 New South Wales state election: The Hills
Party	Candidate	Votes	%	±%
Liberal	Fred Caterson	23,459	75.9	+12.7
Labor	Susan Deane	7,458	24.1	+1.3
Total formal votes		30,917	97.2	−0.8
Informal votes		906	2.8	+0.8
Turnout		31,823	94.8	
Liberal hold		Swing	+5.4	

==== 1984 ====
1984 New South Wales state election: The Hills
Party	Candidate	Votes	%	±%
Liberal	Fred Caterson	19,649	62.0	+2.5
Labor	Barry Calvert	7,807	24.6	−10.2
Independent	John Griffiths	2,923	9.2	+9.2
Democrats	Toni Chapman	1,322	4.2	−1.5
Total formal votes		31,701	97.9	+0.2
Informal votes		677	2.1	−0.2
Turnout		32,378	92.7	+0.9
Two-party-preferred result
Liberal	Fred Caterson		68.9	+7.2
Labor	Barry Calvert		31.1	−7.2
Liberal hold		Swing	+7.2	

==== 1981 ====
1981 New South Wales state election: The Hills
Party	Candidate	Votes	%	±%
Liberal	Fred Caterson	17,284	59.5	+7.3
Labor	Barry Calvert	10,124	34.8	−8.3
Democrats	Rona Samuels	1,660	5.7	+1.0
Total formal votes		29,068	97.7	
Informal votes		696	2.3	
Turnout		29,764	91.8	
Two-party-preferred result
Liberal	Fred Caterson	17,584	61.7	+6.9
Labor	Barry Calvert	10,924	38.3	−6.9
Liberal hold		Swing	+6.9	

=== Elections in the 1970s ===
==== 1978 ====
1978 New South Wales state election: The Hills
Party	Candidate	Votes	%	±%
Liberal	Fred Caterson	16,789	52.2	−12.9
Labor	Paul Gibson	13,851	43.1	+8.2
Democrats	Robert Blackman	1,509	4.7	+4.7
Total formal votes		32,149	98.5	−0.2
Informal votes		504	1.5	+0.2
Turnout		32,653	94.1	−1.5
Two-party-preferred result
Liberal	Fred Caterson	17,544	54.6	−10.6
Labor	Paul Gibson	14,605	45.4	+10.6
Liberal hold		Swing	−10.6	

==== 1976 by-election ====
1976 The Hills by-election Saturday 9 October
Party	Candidate	Votes	%	±%
Liberal	Fred Caterson	14,526	57.9	−7.2
Labor	Paul Gibson	8,951	35.7	+0.8
Workers	Hugh Frazer	1,620	6.4	
Total formal votes		25,097	99.2	+0.5
Informal votes		198	0.8	−0.5
Turnout		25,295	79.5	−16.1
Liberal hold		Swing		

Max Ruddock (Liberal) resigned.

==== 1976 ====
1976 New South Wales state election: The Hills
Party	Candidate	Votes	%	±%
Liberal	Max Ruddock	19,144	65.1	−1.3
Labor	Paul Gibson	10,239	34.9	+6.1
Total formal votes		29,383	98.7	+0.3
Informal votes		399	1.3	−0.3
Turnout		29,782	95.6	+0.6
Liberal hold		Swing	−5.0	

==== 1973 ====
1973 New South Wales state election: The Hills
Party	Candidate	Votes	%	±%
Liberal	Max Ruddock	16,988	66.4	+6.0
Labor	Judith Mackinolty	7,376	28.8	−3.1
Democratic Labor	John Woulfe	1,225	4.8	−2.8
Total formal votes		25,589	98.4	
Informal votes		418	1.6	
Turnout		26,007	95.0	
Two-party-preferred result
Liberal	Max Ruddock	17,968	70.2	+3.7
Labor	Judith Mackinolty	7,621	29.8	−3.7
Liberal hold		Swing	+3.7	

==== 1971 ====
1971 New South Wales state election: The Hills
Party	Candidate	Votes	%	±%
Liberal	Max Ruddock	18,978	60.4	−3.8
Labor	Michael Gillian	10,025	31.9	+9.7
Democratic Labor	John Stewart	2,391	7.6	+3.0
Total formal votes		31,394	98.4	
Informal votes		513	1.6	
Turnout		31,907	94.1	
Two-party-preferred result
Liberal	Max Ruddock	20,891	66.5	−5.9
Labor	Michael Gillian	10,503	33.5	+5.9
Liberal hold		Swing	−5.9	

=== Elections in the 1960s ===
==== 1968 ====
1968 New South Wales state election: The Hills
Party	Candidate	Votes	%	±%
Liberal	Max Ruddock	19,039	64.2	−5.8
Labor	Eli Hirsch	6,567	22.2	−7.8
Independent	Keith Phillis	2,656	9.0	+9.0
Democratic Labor	Michael Fagan	1,378	4.6	+4.6
Total formal votes		29,640	97.0	
Informal votes		923	3.0	
Turnout		30,563	94.4	
Two-party-preferred result
Liberal	Max Ruddock	21,469	72.4	+2.4
Labor	Eli Hirsch	8,171	27.6	−2.4
Liberal hold		Swing	+2.4	

==== 1965 ====
1965 New South Wales state election: The Hills
Party	Candidate	Votes	%	±%
Liberal	Max Ruddock	21,906	72.1	+15.8
Labor	Alan Francis	8,470	27.9	+27.9
Total formal votes		30,376	98.3	+1.0
Informal votes		521	1.7	−1.0
Turnout		30,897	93.3	+0.1
Liberal hold		Swing	N/A	

==== 1962 ====
1962 New South Wales state election: The Hills
Party	Candidate	Votes	%	±%
Liberal	Max Ruddock	13,781	56.3	
Independent Liberal	Alfred Dennis	10,704	43.7	+43.7
Total formal votes		24,485	97.3	
Informal votes		681	2.7	
Turnout		25,166	93.2	
Liberal hold		Swing	N/A	

- The Hills was a new seat that was notionally a safe Liberal seat. Alfred Dennis was the sitting Liberal member for Blacktown.
