= 1976 The Hills state by-election =

Election result for The Hills, New South Wales, Australia

A by-election was held in the state electoral district of The Hills on 9 October 1976. The by-election was triggered by the resignation of Max Ruddock (Liberal).

== Dates ==
Date	Event
25 May 1976	Max Ruddock resigned.
6 September 1976	Writ of election issued by the Speaker of the Legislative Assembly and close of electoral rolls.
14 September 1976	Day of nomination
9 October 1976	Polling day
29 October 1976	Return of writ

== Result ==
1976 The Hills by-election
Party	Candidate	Votes	%	±%
Liberal	Fred Caterson	14,526	57.9	−7.2
Labor	Paul Gibson	8,951	35.7	+0.8
Workers	Hugh Frazer	1,620	6.4	
Total formal votes		25,097	99.2	+0.5
Informal votes		198	0.8	−0.5
Turnout		25,295	79.5	−16.1
Liberal hold		Swing		

== See also ==
- Electoral results for the district of The Hills
- List of New South Wales state by-elections
