= Electoral results for the district of St Marys =

Election results for state seat of St Marys, New South Wales, Australia

St Marys, an electoral district of the Legislative Assembly in the Australian state of New South Wales had two incarnations, from 1981 to 1988 and from 1991 to 1999.

Election	Member	Party
1981	Ron Mulock	Labor
1984	Ron Mulock	Labor
Second incarnation (1991–1999)
Member	Party	Term
1991	Tony Aquilina	Labor
1995	Jim Anderson	Labor

== Election results ==
=== Elections in the 1990s ===
==== 1995 ====
1995 New South Wales state election: St Marys
Party	Candidate	Votes	%	±%
Labor	Jim Anderson	20,131	63.2	+2.0
Liberal	Bill Anastasiadis	8,921	28.0	−2.4
Democrats	Suzanne Saunders	2,809	8.8	+0.4
Total formal votes		31,861	92.6	+3.0
Informal votes		2,533	7.4	−3.0
Turnout		34,394	94.2	
Two-party-preferred result
Labor	Jim Anderson	21,324	68.9	+2.4
Liberal	Bill Anastasiadis	9,645	31.1	−2.4
Labor hold		Swing	+2.4	

==== 1991 ====
1991 New South Wales state election: St Marys
Party	Candidate	Votes	%	±%
Labor	Tony Aquilina	18,726	61.1	+6.8
Liberal	Barry Haylock	9,312	30.4	−4.0
Democrats	Suzanne Saunders	2,588	8.5	+8.5
Total formal votes		30,626	89.6	−5.5
Informal votes		3,553	10.4	+5.5
Turnout		34,179	93.4	
Two-party-preferred result
Labor	Tony Aquilina	19,664	66.4	+6.9
Liberal	Barry Haylock	9,941	33.6	−6.9
Labor notional hold		Swing	+6.9	

St Mary's was a new seat with a notional Labor majority.

District re-created

==== 1988 - 1991 ====
District abolished

District abolished

=== Elections in the 1980s ===
==== 1984 ====
1984 New South Wales state election: St Marys
Party	Candidate	Votes	%	±%
Labor	Ron Mulock	22,662	66.6	−10.9
Liberal	Daryl Chamberlain	9,826	28.9	+6.4
Democrats	Viv Carter	1,526	4.5	+4.5
Total formal votes		34,014	97.2	+1.3
Informal votes		961	2.8	−1.3
Turnout		34,975	91.8	+1.2
Two-party-preferred result
Labor	Ron Mulock		69.0	−8.5
Liberal	Daryl Chamberlain		31.0	+8.5
Labor hold		Swing	−8.5	

==== 1981 ====
1981 New South Wales state election: St Marys
Party	Candidate	Votes	%	±%
Labor	Ron Mulock	22,820	77.5	−2.4
Liberal	Rodney Field	6,615	22.5	+2.4
Total formal votes		29,435	95.9	
Informal votes		1,271	4.1	
Turnout		30,706	90.6	
Labor notional hold		Swing	−2.4	
