= Electoral results for the district of Port Jackson =

Election results for Port Jackson, New South Wales, Australia

Port Jackson, an electoral district of the Legislative Assembly in the Australian state of New South Wales, was established in 1991. It was abolished in 2007 and substantially replaced by the recreated electorates of Balmain and Sydney.

Election	Member	Party
1991	Sandra Nori	Labor
1995	Sandra Nori	Labor
1999	Sandra Nori	Labor
2003	Sandra Nori	Labor

== Election results ==
=== Elections in the 2000s ===
==== 2003 ====
2003 New South Wales state election: Port Jackson
Party	Candidate	Votes	%	±%
Labor	Sandra Nori	18,763	42.1	−11.8
Greens	Jamie Parker	12,856	28.9	+21.0
Liberal	Nick Dyer	9,182	20.6	+2.2
Unity	Polly Chan	1,538	3.5	+3.5
Democrats	Simon Glastonbury	1,027	2.3	−5.2
Fishing Party	Victor Shen	649	1.5	+1.5
Socialist Alliance	Paul Benedek	541	1.2	+1.2
Total formal votes		44,556	97.8	+1.2
Informal votes		1,000	2.2	−1.2
Turnout		45,556	86.4	
Notional two-party-preferred count
Labor	Sandra Nori	24,193	68.0	−7.1
Liberal	Nick Dyer	11,379	32.0	+7.1
Two-candidate-preferred result
Labor	Sandra Nori	19,713	57.3	−17.8
Greens	Jamie Parker	14,676	42.7	+42.7
Labor hold		Swing	−17.8	

=== Elections in the 1990s ===
==== 1999 ====
1999 New South Wales state election: Port Jackson
Party	Candidate	Votes	%	±%
Labor	Sandra Nori	21,582	53.9	+0.9
Liberal	Keri Huxley	7,359	18.4	0.0
Greens	Jenny Ryde	3,159	7.9	+7.5
Democrats	Peter Furness	2,993	7.5	+4.2
Independent	Jean Lennane	2,944	7.3	+7.3
One Nation	Michael Vescio	735	1.8	+1.8
Communist	Dennis Doherty	549	1.4	−2.6
Democratic Socialist	Marina Carman	310	0.8	+0.8
Gun Owners and Sporting Hunters Rights	Robert Loschiavo	174	0.4	+0.4
People First	Ken Druery	119	0.3	+0.3
Natural Law	Josh Burvill	81	0.2	+0.2
Non-Custodial Parents	Jean-Marcel Malliate	67	0.2	+0.2
Total formal votes		40,072	96.6	+0.4
Informal votes		1,390	3.4	−0.4
Turnout		41,462	89.4	
Two-party-preferred result
Labor	Sandra Nori	25,904	75.1	+1.6
Liberal	Keri Huxley	8,567	24.9	−1.6
Labor hold		Swing	+1.6	

==== 1995 ====
1995 New South Wales state election: Port Jackson
Party	Candidate	Votes	%	±%
Labor	Sandra Nori	17,696	53.6	+2.9
No Aircraft Noise	Hall Greenland	6,496	19.7	+19.7
Liberal	Christine Bourne	6,085	18.4	+1.2
Independent	Denis Doherty	1,387	4.2	+4.2
Democrats	Matthew Piscioneri	1,059	3.2	+0.5
Call to Australia	Katherine Wood	281	0.9	+0.2
Total formal votes		33,004	96.3	+2.4
Informal votes		1,269	3.7	−2.4
Turnout		34,273	90.5	
Two-party-preferred result
Labor	Sandra Nori	19,564	63.6	−0.1
No Aircraft Noise	Hall Greenland	11,180	36.4	+36.4
Labor hold		Swing	−0.1	

==== 1991 ====
1991 New South Wales state election: Port Jackson
Party	Candidate	Votes	%	±%
Labor	Sandra Nori	15,510	50.7	+8.3
Independent	Dawn Fraser	5,785	18.9	−4.4
Liberal	Michael Bach	5,285	17.3	−1.7
Greens	Hall Greenland	2,140	7.0	+7.0
Independent	Des Kennedy	867	2.8	+2.8
Democrats	Yvonne Penfold	815	2.7	−0.2
Call to Australia	Bruce Thompson	189	0.6	+0.6
Total formal votes		30,591	93.9	−2.3
Informal votes		1,981	6.1	+2.3
Turnout		32,572	89.4	
Two-candidate-preferred result
Labor	Sandra Nori	18,114	63.7	+13.2
Independent	Dawn Fraser	10,322	36.3	−13.2
Labor notional hold		Swing	+13.2	

Port Jackson was a new seat with a notional Labor majority.
