= Electoral results for the district of Castle Hill =

Election results for Castle Hill, New South Wales, Australia

Castle Hill, an electoral district of the Legislative Assembly in the Australian state of New South Wales has had one incarnation, from 2007 to the present.

== Members for Castle Hill ==
| Election | Member | Party |
|---|---|---|
| 2007 | Michael Richardson | Liberal |
| 2011 | Dominic Perrottet | Liberal |
| 2015 | Ray Williams | Liberal |
| 2019 | Ray Williams | Liberal |
| 2023 | Mark Hodges | Liberal |

== Election results ==
=== Elections in the 2020s ===
==== 2023 ====
2023 New South Wales state election: Castle Hill
| Party | Candidate | Votes | % | ±% |
|---|---|---|---|---|
| Liberal | Mark Hodges | 27,085 | 50.7 | −13.4 |
| Labor | Tina Cartwright | 15,159 | 28.4 | +8.3 |
| Greens | Tina Kordrostami | 4,786 | 9.0 | +0.5 |
| Liberal Democrats | My Trinh | 3,642 | 6.8 | +6.8 |
| Sustainable Australia | Eric Claus | 1,403 | 2.6 | −0.5 |
| Independent | Nathan Organ | 1,352 | 2.5 | +2.5 |
| Total formal votes | | 53,427 | 97.6 | +0.1 |
| Informal votes | | 1,300 | 2.4 | −0.1 |
| Turnout | | 54,727 | 90.6 | −1.5 |
Two-party-preferred result
| Liberal | Mark Hodges | 29,223 | 60.9 | −11.5 |
| Labor | Tina Cartwright | 18,760 | 39.1 | +11.5 |
| Liberal hold | | Swing | −11.5 | |

=== Elections in the 2010s ===
==== 2019 ====
2019 New South Wales state election: Castle Hill
| Party | Candidate | Votes | % | ±% |
|---|---|---|---|---|
| Liberal | Ray Williams | 36,047 | 68.57 | −2.41 |
| Labor | David Ager | 10,455 | 19.89 | +3.91 |
| Greens | David Field | 4,116 | 7.83 | +0.86 |
| Sustainable Australia | Herman Kuipers | 1,953 | 3.72 | +3.71 |
| Total formal votes | | 52,571 | 97.49 | +0.14 |
| Informal votes | | 1,354 | 2.51 | −0.14 |
| Turnout | | 53,925 | 92.59 | −0.53 |
Two-party-preferred result
| Liberal | Ray Williams | 37,043 | 74.68 | −4.72 |
| Labor | David Ager | 12,561 | 25.32 | +4.72 |
| Liberal hold | | Swing | −4.72 | |

==== 2015 ====
2015 New South Wales state election: Castle Hill
| Party | Candidate | Votes | % | ±% |
|---|---|---|---|---|
| Liberal | Ray Williams | 34,137 | 71.0 | −3.7 |
| Labor | Matt Ritchie | 7,686 | 16.0 | +4.5 |
| Greens | Michael Bellstedt | 3,353 | 7.0 | −1.1 |
| Christian Democrats | Muriel Sultana | 1,535 | 3.2 | −0.4 |
| No Land Tax | Anna Stevis | 1,381 | 2.9 | +2.9 |
| Total formal votes | | 48,092 | 97.3 | +0.6 |
| Informal votes | | 1,311 | 2.7 | −0.6 |
| Turnout | | 49,403 | 93.1 | −0.0 |
Two-party-preferred result
| Liberal | Ray Williams | 35,544 | 79.4 | −5.3 |
| Labor | Matt Ritchie | 9,224 | 20.6 | +5.3 |
| Liberal hold | | Swing | −5.3 | |

==== 2011 ====
2011 New South Wales state election: Castle Hill
| Party | Candidate | Votes | % | ±% |
|---|---|---|---|---|
| Liberal | Dominic Perrottet | 32,466 | 68.7 | +12.2 |
| Labor | Ryan Tracey | 6,690 | 14.2 | −8.8 |
| Greens | Alex Wallbank | 3,717 | 7.9 | −1.1 |
| Christian Democrats | Aileen Mountifield | 1,765 | 3.7 | −1.6 |
| Independent | Aaron Mendham | 1,609 | 3.4 | +3.4 |
| Family First | Ari Katsoulas | 1,025 | 2.2 | +2.2 |
| Total formal votes | | 47,272 | 97.1 | −0.5 |
| Informal votes | | 1,414 | 2.9 | +0.5 |
| Turnout | | 48,686 | 93.7 | +0.4 |
Two-party-preferred result
| Liberal | Dominic Perrottet | 34,421 | 80.8 | +11.8 |
| Labor | Ryan Tracey | 8,163 | 19.2 | −11.8 |
| Liberal hold | | Swing | +11.8 | |

=== Elections in the 2000s ===
==== 2007 ====
2007 New South Wales state election: Castle Hill
| Party | Candidate | Votes | % | ±% |
|---|---|---|---|---|
| Liberal | Michael Richardson | 24,999 | 56.5 | +6.7 |
| Labor | Alex Mustafa | 10,138 | 22.9 | −5.9 |
| Greens | Carol Flanagan | 3,961 | 9.0 | +2.1 |
| Christian Democrats | Darryl Allen | 2,362 | 5.3 | +0.9 |
| Unity | Sheng Lin | 1,987 | 4.5 | +0.8 |
| AAFI | Mervyn Foley | 780 | 1.8 | +0.4 |
| Total formal votes | | 44,227 | 97.6 | −0.5 |
| Informal votes | | 1,094 | 2.4 | +0.5 |
| Turnout | | 45,321 | 93.3 | |
Two-party-preferred result
| Liberal | Michael Richardson | 27,340 | 69.1 | +8.3 |
| Labor | Alex Mustafa | 12,240 | 30.9 | −8.3 |
| Liberal notional hold | | Swing | +8.3 | |
