= 1993 The Hills state by-election =

- 28 August 1993

Electoral district of The Hills in the New South Wales Legislative Assembly
	First party	Second party
		IND
Candidate	Michael Richardson	Roy Potter
Party	Liberal	Independent
Primary vote	19,418	6,466
Percentage	60.8%	20.3%
Swing	▼1.7	▼0.6
TCP	69.0%	31.0%
TCP swing	▲1.6	▼1.6
MP before election
Tony Packard
Liberal
Elected MP
Michael Richardson
Liberal

A by-election was held in the state electoral district of The Hills on 28 August 1993. The by-election was triggered by Tony Packard (Liberal) resigning after he was convicted of charges relating to the unlawful use of listening devices at his car dealership.

== Dates ==
Date	Event
11 June 1993	Tony Packard pleaded guilty to illegally using a listening device.
27 July 1993	Tony Packard resigned from parliament.
9 August 1993	Writ of election issued by the Speaker of the Legislative Assembly and close of electoral rolls.
12 August 1993	Day of nomination
28 August 1993	Polling day
10 September 1993	Return of writ

== Result ==
1993 The Hills by-election Saturday 28 August
Party	Candidate	Votes	%	±%
Liberal	Michael Richardson	19,418	60.8	−1.7
Independent	Roy Potter	6,466	20.3	−0.6
Independent	David Baggs	1,685	5.3	
Call to Australia	Bruce Coleman	1,375	4.3	
Independent	Mick Gallagher	1,231	3.9	
Independent	Ruth Rothery	677	2.1	
Independent	Tony Pettitt	414	1.3	
Independent	Louis Solomons	313	1.0	
Independent	Ronald Feiner	189	0.6	
Independent	Ivor F	80	0.3	
Independent	Norman Hooper	75	0.2	
Total formal votes		31,923	97.3	
Informal votes		886	2.7	
Turnout		32,809	81.3	
Two-candidate-preferred result
Liberal	Michael Richardson	20,184	69.0	+1.6
Independent	Roy Potter	9,083	31.0	−1.6
Liberal hold		Swing	+1.6	

== See also ==
- Electoral results for the district of The Hills
- List of New South Wales state by-elections
