= 1990 The Hills state by-election =

Election result for The Hills, New South Wales, Australia

A by-election was held in the state electoral district of The Hills on 1 September 1990. The by-election was triggered by the resignation of Fred Caterson (Liberal).

== Dates ==
Date	Event
31 July 1990	Fred Caterson resigned.
13 August 1990	Writ of election issued by the Speaker of the Legislative Assembly and close of electoral rolls.
17 August 1990	Day of nomination
1 September 1990	Polling day
21 September 1990	Return of writ

== Result ==
1990 The Hills by-election
Party	Candidate	Votes	%	±%
Liberal	Tony Packard	14,633	49.9	−26.0
Independent	Roy Potter	6,013	20.5	
Labor	Lenore Craven	4,228	14.4	−9.7
Democrats	Michael Antrum	1,712	5.8	
Total formal votes		29,327	98.2	
Informal votes		527	1.8	
Turnout		29,854	81.6	
Two-party-preferred result
Liberal	Tony Packard	15,741	57.3	−18.5
Independent	Roy Potter	11,713	42.7	
Liberal hold		Swing	−18.5	

== See also ==
- Electoral results for the district of The Hills
- List of New South Wales state by-elections
