= Electoral district of McKell =

Former state electoral district of New South Wales, Australia

McKell was an electoral district of the Legislative Assembly in the Australian state of New South Wales, created in 1988, largely replacing the abolished district of Elizabeth. It was named after William McKell, former Premier of New South Wales (1941–1947). It included most of inner Sydney and also Lord Howe Island. It was abolished in 1991 and largely replaced by Port Jackson.

Its only representative was Sandra Nori, who later represented Port Jackson.

== Members for McKell ==
Member	Party	Period
Sandra Nori	Labor	1988–1991

== Election results ==
=== 1988 ===
1988 New South Wales state election: McKell
Party	Candidate	Votes	%	±%
Labor	Sandra Nori	13,004	50.2	−8.8
Independent	Frank Sartor	6,075	23.5	+23.5
Liberal	Michael Bach	4,609	17.8	−0.3
Democrats	Ian Faulks	1,173	4.5	−2.9
Independent	Christopher Barry	272	1.0	+1.0
Independent	Margaret Ponting	263	1.0	+1.0
Independent	John Sloman	260	1.0	+1.0
Independent	Ernest Ridding	250	1.0	+1.0
Total formal votes		25,906	95.7	−0.2
Informal votes		1,155	4.3	+0.2
Turnout		27,061	86.2	
Two-candidate-preferred result
Labor	Sandra Nori	13,583	56.6	−15.6
Independent	Frank Sartor	10,420	43.4	+43.4
Labor notional hold		Swing	−15.6	
