= Jim Anderson (Australian politician) =

Australian politician

James Anderson (8 August 1943 – 22 March 2003) was an Australian politician, elected as a member of the New South Wales Legislative Assembly. He was the Labor Party member for St Marys from 1995 to 1999 and Londonderry from 1999 to his death in 2003.

He had previously served as the mayor of the City of Blacktown from 1991 to 1995, having already served as a councillor there from 1987.

== Notes ==
Civic offices
Preceded by Leo Kelly	Mayor of Blacktown; 1991–1995	Succeeded by Charlie Lowles
New South Wales Legislative Assembly
Preceded by Tony Aquilina	Member for St Marys; 1995–1999	District abolished
Preceded by Paul Gibson	Member for Londonderry; 1999–2003	Succeeded by Allan Shearan
