= Max Ruddock =

Australian politician

Minister for Transport Minister for Highways
- In office 10 October 1975 – 23 January 1976
- Premier: Tom Lewis
- Preceded by: Wal Fife
- Succeeded by: Tim Bruxner

Member of the New South Wales Parliament for The Hills
- In office 3 March 1962 – 25 May 1976
- Preceded by: New district
- Succeeded by: Fred Caterson

Personal details
- Born: 2 January 1914 Marrickville, New South Wales, Australia
- Died: 31 May 1976 (aged 62) Sydney, New South Wales, Australia
- Party: Liberal
- Spouse(s): Emmie Ruddock (née Chappell)
- Children: Philip Ruddock

Maxwell Stanley Ruddock (2 January 1914 – 31 May 1976) was a New South Wales politician, Assistant Treasurer and Minister of the Crown in the cabinets of Tom Lewis and Sir Eric Willis. Representing the Liberal Party he was a member of the New South Wales Legislative Assembly for 14 years from 3 March 1962 until his resignation on 25 May 1976.

== Early career ==
Ruddock was born in 1914 in Marrickville, New South Wales, the son of Stanley Ruddock, a forestry officer, and May Myers Ruddock (née Cropper). He was educated at Fort Street Boys High School and later attended the University of Sydney. At university he gained a Bachelor of Economics (BEc) in 1935 and a Masters (MEc) three years later in 1938.

Originally working as a teacher, he continued his academic studies, becoming an Associate of the Australian Society of Accountants in 1940. He married Emmie Chappell on 24 August 1940 and had two daughters and a son, Philip Maxwell. He was then employed as an economic adviser to the Commonwealth government in 1942 and the Deputy Prices Commissioner from 1942 to 1948, but was forced to return to Sydney, owing to his mother-in-law suffering from cancer. Ruddock was then appointed as a board director at David Jones from 1948 to 1949, a director of Jones Brothers (1949–1952) and became a public accountant from 1956.

== Early political career ==
Ruddock first entered politics when he stood for and was elected as a Councillor of Hornsby Shire Council in 1954. He was elected from a single term as Deputy Shire President from December 1955 to December 1956. When he was a Councillor in 1959, Ruddock was alerted by his 16-year-old son, Philip, to a legal impediment to the State Government's desire to make the suburb of Westleigh an industrial area, thereby resulting in the preservation of the residential nature of Westleigh. Ruddock later rose to be Shire President from December 1960 to December 1961. As a prominent member of the council, he became involved in many local and regional organisations, including as the General Secretary of New South Wales Wheat and Wool Growers Association (1959–1962), a trustee of Lane Cove National Park (1961–1966) and also for Ku-ring-gai Chase National Park in 1964. He became a member of the new Liberal Party and got involved on a local level.

Ruddock contested and won preselection for the New South Wales Legislative Assembly seat of The Hills, a new seat with a notional Liberal majority, taking in the northern and Liberal voting end of the seat of Blacktown. Ruddock defeated the sitting Liberal Member for Blacktown, Alfred Dennis, for preselection and Dennis subsequently contested the seat as an Independent Liberal. At the 1962 election Ruddock defeated Dennis with 56.28% of the vote and went on to hold this seat a further five times.

== Later career and legacy ==
Ruddock remained on the backbenches, and stayed as a Hornsby Councillor until 1965. On 3 January 1975, with the ascendancy of Tom Lewis as Premier of NSW he was appointed as Assistant Treasurer of New South Wales and Minister for Revenue, an office which he held until 10 October 1975 when he was made Minister for Transport and Minister for Highways. He held these ministries until Lewis was replaced as Premier by Eric Willis, who then reappointed him as Assistant Treasurer and Minister for Revenue on 23 January 1976. He held this office until the Coalition government lost the 1976 election on 14 May 1976.

He lived to see his son, Philip, elected to the Australian House of Representatives seat of Parramatta on 22 September 1973. His health in decline, having suffered all his life from a degenerative muscle disease that, by the time he entered Parliament, made walking difficult, Ruddock did not stay in politics long afterwards, resigning his seat on 25 May 1976 and retiring from public life. However, six days after retiring from politics, aged 62, on 31 May 1976 he suffered a stroke and died in hospital. A state funeral at St James' Chapel, Castle Hill, was held for him, which was attended by the Governor, Sir Roden Cutler. In his honour, Parramatta City Council dedicated the "Max Ruddock Reserve" in Winston Hills soon after his death. Philip went on to serve in the Howard government as a Minister of the Crown, in particular as the Attorney-General of Australia from 2003 to 2007. When Philip was elected as mayor of Hornsby in September 2017, he reflected on his father's time in office, particularly in Hornsby Shire: "His record and passion for Hornsby is a demonstration of his enormous affection for this area — not to mention the fact that he was a great role model to me".

Civic offices
Preceded by Sydney Storey	Deputy Shire President of Hornsby; 1955 – 1956	Succeeded by Kenneth Mason
Preceded by Harold Headen	Shire President of Hornsby; 1960 – 1961	Succeeded by Donald Tulloch
New South Wales Legislative Assembly
New district	Member for The Hills; 1962 – 1976	Succeeded by Fred Caterson
Political offices
Preceded by Wal Fife	Assistant Treasurer of New South Wales; 1975	Succeeded by Peter Coleman
New title	Minister for Revenue; 1975	Succeeded by Peter Coleman
Preceded by Wal Fife	Minister for Transport; 1975 – 1976	Succeeded by Tim Bruxner
Preceded by Wal Fife	Minister for Highways; 1975 – 1976	Succeeded by Tim Bruxner
Preceded by Peter Coleman	Assistant Treasurer of New South Wales; 1976	Vacant Title next held by Ken Booth
Preceded by Peter Coleman	Minister for Revenue; 1976	Post abolished
