= Fred Caterson =

Australian politician

Frederick Douglas Claude Caterson (20 August 1919 – 25 February 2000) was an Australian politician. He was the Liberal member for The Hills in the New South Wales Legislative Assembly from 1976 to 1990.

Caterson was born at Nobbys Creek near the Tweed River, attending Sydney Boys High School from 1930–1935. He served in the Australian Military Forces before becoming chief industrial officer of Qantas 1943–1959. In 1959 he became Secretary of the Department of Labour and Chairman of the Employment Board of Papua New Guinea. In 1956 he was elected to Baulkham Hills Shire Council, serving until 1959. A member of the Liberal Party, he was re-elected in 1962 and served as Deputy President 1958–59 and 1965–83.

In 1976, the Liberal member for the local state seat of The Hills, Max Ruddock, resigned, and Caterson was chosen to contest the by-election for the Liberal Party, which he won easily. He remained on the backbenches in Parliament, holding his seat without difficulty until his resignation in 1990. The by-election held to replace him was won by Liberal candidate Tony Packard.

New South Wales Legislative Assembly
Preceded by Max Ruddock	Member for The Hills; 1976–1990	Succeeded by Tony Packard
