= Sandra Nori =

Australian politician

Minister for Women
- In office 11 July 2002 – 2 April 2007
- Premier: Bob Carr; Morris Iemma
- Preceded by: Faye Lo Po'
- Succeeded by: Verity Firth

Minister for Tourism and Sport and Recreation
- In office 2 April 2003 – 2 April 2007
- Preceded by: herself (as Minister for Tourism); Graham West (as Minister for Sport and Recreation)
- Succeeded by: Matt Brown (as Minister for Tourism); Morris Iemma (as Minister for Sport and Recreation)

Minister for Tourism
- In office 8 April 1999 – 2 April 2003
- Premier: Bob Carr; Morris Iemma
- Preceded by: Bob Debus
- Succeeded by: herself (as Minister for Tourism and Sport and Recreation)

Minister for Small Business
- In office 8 April 1999 – 2 April 2003
- Premier: Bob Carr
- Succeeded by: David Campbell

Member of the New South Wales Parliament for Port Jackson
- In office 25 May 1991 – 2 March 2007
- Preceded by: New district
- Succeeded by: District abolished

Member of the New South Wales Parliament for McKell
- In office 19 March 1988 – 3 May 1991
- Preceded by: New district
- Succeeded by: District abolished

Personal details
- Born: Sandra Christine Nori; 16 June 1953 (age 73) Newcastle, New South Wales, Australia
- Party: Labor
- Education: University of Sydney
- Occupation: Politician
- Profession: Health care worker, research officer

Sandra Christine Nori (born 16 June 1953) is a former Australian politician and presently a company director and Member of Macquarie University Council.

Nori was a member of the New South Wales Legislative Assembly representing the electoral districts of McKell (1988–1991) and Port Jackson (1991–2007) for the Labor Party. She served in a range of ministerial portfolios between 1999 and 2007. Since leaving politics, Nori has been appointed to a number of roles as a non-executive director.

== Early years and background ==
Nori was born in Newcastle to Italian parents. She was educated at Petersham Girls High School and University of Sydney, graduating with a Bachelor of Economics. Nori was formerly married to Senator John Faulkner and together they have two children.

== Parliamentary career ==
A member of the Australian Labor Party, Nori represented two electorates successively: the newly created electorate of McKell between 1988 and 1991 (which was abolished at the 1991 state election; and the newly created electorate of Port Jackson between 1991 and 2007 (which was again abolished at the 2007 state election).

In the battle for re-election as the Member for McKell at the 1988 state election, Nori defeated independent candidate, Frank Sartor. Sartor went on to join the Labor Party, represent the electorate of Rockdale, and become a senior Labor minister.

She was Minister for Small Business from April 1999 to April 2003, and was Minister for Tourism (later Tourism and Sport and Recreation) from April 1999 and Minister for Women from 2002 until her retirement from parliament in March 2007.

== Personal life ==
In the 1990s Nori was in a personal relationship with Paul Gibson, who was at that time Labor member for Londonderry. In 2007 it was alleged that Gibson had assaulted her. A subsequent police investigation found insufficient evidence to lay charges.

== Career after leaving New South Wales parliament ==
In 2008, Nori was appointed to the Council of Macquarie University and also serves on the boards of the NSW TAFE Commission, Domain Resorts and Residences, and Komosion, a digital marketing and website publishing software company.

Nori is also a Member of the Board of Advisors of the Global Panel Foundation, a non-government organisation that works behind the scenes in crisis areas around the world.

Sandra was appointed in 2011 to the National Board of the Duke of Edinburgh's International Award - Australia and was until retiring in 2021, its National Deputy Chair.

== Honours ==
- Silver Distinguished Service Medal, The Duke of Edinburgh's International Award - Australia (2017) recognising her substantial services to youth, especially regional and disadvantaged young Australians.
- Gold Distinguished Service Medal, The Duke of Edinburgh's International Award – Australia (2021)

New South Wales Legislative Assembly
New district	Member for McKell; 1988–1991	District abolished
New district	Member for Port Jackson; 1991–2007	District abolished
Political offices
Preceded by Bob Debus	Minister for Tourism; 1999–2007	Succeeded by Matt Brown
Vacant Title last held by Carl Scully as Minister for Small Business and Regional Development (1995)	Minister for Small Business; 1999–2003	Succeeded by David Campbell
Preceded by Faye Lo Po'	Minister for Women; 2002–2007	Succeeded by Verity Firth
Preceded by Morris Iemma	Minister for Sport and Recreation; 2003–2007	Succeeded by Graham West
