= Tony Aquilina =

Australian politician

Anthony Saviour Aquilina (1 June 1950 – 18 September 2003) was an Australian politician.

Tony Aquilina was born in Malta and was married to Joanne (later divorced); they had two sons. He worked as a primary school teacher. His then-wife Joanne was also a teacher at Jamison High School. A long-time resident of Jamisontown Aquilina became a mayor of Penrith where he also worked with and campaigned for Ross Free (also a former teacher). He was elected to the New South Wales Legislative Assembly as the Labor Party member for the seat of Mulgoa. He switched to the seat of St Marys in 1991 after Mulgoa was abolished, but his second term was beleaguered by scandal, and then-Opposition Leader Bob Carr forced him to resign at the 1995 election in order to end the associated bad publicity. In 1996, he was found guilty on fraud charges and was sentenced to one year in prison, which on appeal was commuted to community service. He died in Sydney after a long illness.

He is not related to John Aquilina, the former Leader of the House in the Legislative Assembly.

== Notes ==
New South Wales Legislative Assembly
New district	Member for Mulgoa; 1988–1991	District abolished
New district	Member for St Marys; 1991–1995	Succeeded by Jim Anderson
Civic offices
Preceded by Faye Lo Po'	Mayor of Penrith; 1991–1992	Succeeded by Bill Gayed
