= Electoral district of Port Jackson =

State electoral district of New South Wales, Australia

Port Jackson was an electoral district of the Legislative Assembly in the Australian state of New South Wales. It was created at the 1991 election, largely from the electorates of Balmain and McKell, and was abolished at the 2007 election being substantially replaced by the recreated electorates of Balmain and Sydney following a redistribution of electoral boundaries completed during 2004.

== Members ==
Member	Party	Term
Sandra Nori	Labor	1991–2007

== Election results ==
2003 New South Wales state election: Port Jackson
Party	Candidate	Votes	%	±%
Labor	Sandra Nori	18,763	42.1	−11.8
Greens	Jamie Parker	12,856	28.9	+21.0
Liberal	Nick Dyer	9,182	20.6	+2.2
Unity	Polly Chan	1,538	3.5	+3.5
Democrats	Simon Glastonbury	1,027	2.3	−5.2
Fishing Party	Victor Shen	649	1.5	+1.5
Socialist Alliance	Paul Benedek	541	1.2	+1.2
Total formal votes		44,556	97.8	+1.2
Informal votes		1,000	2.2	−1.2
Turnout		45,556	86.4	
Notional two-party-preferred count
Labor	Sandra Nori	24,193	68.0	−7.1
Liberal	Nick Dyer	11,379	32.0	+7.1
Two-candidate-preferred result
Labor	Sandra Nori	19,713	57.3	−17.8
Greens	Jamie Parker	14,676	42.7	+42.7
Labor hold		Swing	−17.8	
