= Michael Richardson (politician) =

Australian politician (born 1949)

Michael John Richardson (born 13 July 1949) is an Australian former politician who was a member of the New South Wales Legislative Assembly representing the electorates of The Hills between 1993 and 2007 and Castle Hill between 2007 and 2011 for the Liberal Party.

Richardson was educated at North Sydney Boys High School and the University of Sydney. He worked for 23 years as a journalist and in publishing. He is married with two adult children.

New South Wales Legislative Assembly
Preceded by Tony Packard	Member for The Hills; 1993 – 2007	District renamed
District renamed	Member for Castle Hill; 2007 – 2011	Succeeded by Dominic Perrottet
