= Electoral district of St Marys =

Former state electoral district of New South Wales, Australia

St Marys was an electoral district of the Legislative Assembly in the Australian state of New South Wales from 1981 to 1988 and 1991 to 1999, which included the suburb of St Marys and replaced Mount Druitt. It was abolished in 1999.

== Members for St Marys ==
First incarnation (1981–1988)
Member	Party	Term
Ron Mulock	Labor	1981–1988
Second incarnation (1991–1999)
Member	Party	Term
Tony Aquilina	Labor	1991–1995
Jim Anderson	Labor	1995–1999

== Election results ==
1995 New South Wales state election: St Marys
Party	Candidate	Votes	%	±%
Labor	Jim Anderson	20,131	63.2	+2.0
Liberal	Bill Anastasiadis	8,921	28.0	−2.4
Democrats	Suzanne Saunders	2,809	8.8	+0.4
Total formal votes		31,861	92.6	+3.0
Informal votes		2,533	7.4	−3.0
Turnout		34,394	94.2	
Two-party-preferred result
Labor	Jim Anderson	21,324	68.9	+2.4
Liberal	Bill Anastasiadis	9,645	31.1	−2.4
Labor hold		Swing	+2.4	
