= Paul Gibson (politician) =

Australian politician & former rugby league footballer

Member of the New South Wales Parliament for Blacktown
- In office 27 March 1999 – 26 March 2011
- Preceded by: Pam Allan
- Succeeded by: John Robertson

Member of the New South Wales Parliament for Londonderry
- In office 19 March 1988 – 27 March 1999
- Preceded by: New seat
- Succeeded by: Jim Anderson

Personal details
- Born: Paul Bernard Gibson; 19 January 1944 (age 82) Young, New South Wales, Australia
- Party: Labor Party
- Children: 4
- Rugby league career

Playing information
- Position: Five-eighth
Club
Years	Team	Pld	T	G	FG	P
1962	South Sydney	2	0	0	0	0
1966	Manly-Warringah	13	3	7	0	23
1967–68	Parramatta	23	5	0	0	15
1969–70	Penrith	9	3	2	0	13
	Total	47	11	9	0	51
- Source: As of 25 June 2009

Paul Bernard Gibson (born 19 January 1944 in Young, New South Wales), is an Australian former politician and former rugby league footballer. He was a member of the New South Wales Legislative Assembly, and represented the electorates of Blacktown between 1999 and 2011 and the electorate of Londonderry from 1988 to 1999, for the Labor Party.

== Sporting career ==
Gibson initially commencing as a junior player with Manly as a winger. His first grade career in the New South Wales Rugby League premiership commenced with South Sydney in 1962, as a centre. He returned to Manly in 1966, moved to Parramatta in 1967, playing five-eighth and then transferred to Penrith in 1969.

== Political career ==
Gibson was elected to represent the safe Labor western Sydney electorate of Londonderry in 1988, and re-elected as the 1991 and 1995 state elections. For the 1999 election, Gibson transferred to Blacktown, and was re-elected at the 2003 and 2007 state elections. During his term in Parliament, he was chair of the Joint Standing Committee on Road Safety (Staysafe), a member of the Standing Committee on Public Works, chair of the Standing Committee on Broadband in Rural and Regional Communities, and a member of the Public Accounts Committee.

=== Controversies ===
==== ICAC inquiry ====
In 1998, he was subject to accusations of corruption by Louis Bayeh (Witness A), a known criminal. After an investigation by the Independent Commission Against Corruption (ICAC) it was found that "there is insufficient evidence to make a finding that Gibson engaged in corrupt conduct". ICAC Assistant Commissioner, Jeremy Badgery-Parker, QC in summing up his findings said that: "I find myself utterly unable to have any confidence whatsoever in the truth or reliability of anything said by Gibson when it conflicts with the evidence of any other witness, other than Bayeh," when commenting on Gibson's testimony, political judgement and credibility.

Under New South Wales electoral law, Gibson could not renominate for his seat while the inquiry was underway. By the time he was finally cleared, the Labor Party had already chosen Allan Shearan to replace him, and Blacktown was the only west Sydney electorate where preselection hadn't been completed.

==== Alleged smear campaign ====
Following union pressure for Gibson to be included in the NSW Ministry and Cabinet Premier Morris Iemma announced on 30 March 2007 that Gibson would become Minister for Sport, Minister for Western Sydney, and Minister Assisting the Minister for Roads (Road Safety). However, immediate conflict arose due to an existing hostile relationship with the Member for the Blue Mountains Phil Koperberg. Elected at the 2007 NSW state election, Koperberg was immediately appointed to the Ministry and Cabinet as Minister for Climate Change, the Environment and Water. When Koperberg sought preselection for Blue Mountains in 2006, Labor officials were secretly notified (by way of an affidavit) that an apprehended violence order had been sought in 1987 by Koperberg's former wife, Katherine Specking. Koperberg alleges that Gibson was behind the 2006 plot to discredit his reputation and accused Gibson at the time of running a smear campaign against him that "bordered on evil". Central to the tension between Koperberg and Gibson was that in 1994, Koperberg parted from his wife after suspecting that Specking and Gibson were having an affair. Gibson and Specking (who had been Gibson's electorate secretary) went on to have a relationship lasting ten years.

==== Alleged assault ====
Gibson was due to be sworn into the Ministry on 2 April 2007, however almost immediately after his appointment to the Ministry was announced, allegations arose that Gibson was involved in an alleged incident causing criminal assault some 16 years earlier. These allegations were raised with Premier Iemma by another Member of Parliament. The alleged victim of the assault was Gibson's former partner, one time Minister for Sport, Sandra Nori. Iemma referred the matter to the NSW Police for investigation and decided not to proceed with Gibson's appointment to the Ministry and Cabinet. The Police investigation determined that, due to insufficient evidence, there was no case to arrest or charge Gibson. Iemma chose to not reinstate Gibson as a Minister.

During this period, more media reports arose about Gibson's close links with the Australian Hotels' Association.

==== Campaign against topless bathing ====
In December 2008, Gibson vowed to support a proposal by Rev Fred Nile, a conservative member of the Legislative Council, to ban topless bathing by women on New South Wales beaches. Gibson claimed that topless women on beaches made the public feel uncomfortable. "If you're on the beach do you want somebody with big knockers next to you when you're there with the kids," he said.

==== Alleged assault at McDonald's ====
In June 2010, it was reported that Gibson was the victim of an alleged assault at McDonald's restaurant car park in Thornleigh. Gibson claimed that he was physically assaulted after arguing with Mario Norman. The argument arose after Norman alleged that Gibson ran over Norman's foot while Gibson was parking his four-wheel-drive car. Gibson referred the matter to NSW Police who charged Norman with assault. Norman has pleaded not guilty to the assault charges with the matter due to be heard in court on 15 December 2010.

=== Resignation ===
On 10 November 2010 Gibson announced his intention to not contest the 2011 state election citing family reasons. It was reported that Gibson had earlier commented about New South Wales Labor on radio that "We've lost our credibility". Gibson had earlier speculated that he may run as an independent candidate for election, should he not gain Labor endorsement. Just hours after Gibson's decision was made public, Transport Minister John Robertson announced that he would be seeking endorsement for the normally safe Labor seat.

New South Wales Legislative Assembly
Preceded by New seat	Member for Londonderry; 1988–1999	Succeeded by Jim Anderson
Preceded by Pam Allan	Member for Blacktown; 1999–2011	Succeeded by John Robertson
