= Tony Packard =

Australian politician

Anthony Charles Packard (born 14 April 1943) is a former Australian politician. He was the Liberal member for The Hills in the New South Wales Legislative Assembly from 1990 to 1993. He had previously migrated to Australia from England in 1967 and operated a new-car dealership in outer Sydney.

== Early life ==
Packard was born in London, England, the son of Charles and Maude Packard. He was educated at Peter Symonds College, a private school in Winchester, before becoming a clerk at Barclays and Lombards banks.

== New-car dealership ==
Tony Packard Holden was a successful and profitable business that used the advertising catch phrase "just up the Windsor Road from Baulkham Hills, and let me do it right for you!" In the course of that business, he illegally used concealed listening devices, later to be the subject of criminal charges.

Tony Packard appeared in “Whicker's World - Living with Waltzing Matilda” Episode 7. He described his belief that Australia was “the lucky country” but expressed doubts about the future of the country due to the strength of the unions.

=== Charity roles ===
He was deputy national president of the Variety Club in Australia for four years, and chairman of the Baulkham Hills Orange Blossom Festival for three years.

== Parliamentary career ==
In 1990, Packard was the successful Liberal candidate in a by-election for The Hills caused by the retirement of Liberal member Fred Caterson. He was re-elected at the general election the following year.

While an MP, Packard was charged over earlier use of concealed listening devices in his car dealership and forced to resign from Parliament in 1993.

New South Wales Legislative Assembly
Preceded by Fred Caterson	Member for The Hills; 1990–1993	Succeeded by Michael Richardson
