= Electoral district of The Hills =

Former state electoral district of New South Wales, Australia

The Hills was an electoral district of the Legislative Assembly in the Australian state of New South Wales from 1962 to 2007. It was a 51.08 km^{2} urban electorate in Sydney's north-west, taking in the suburbs of Carlingford, Castle Hill, Cherrybrook, Glenhaven, Kellyville, Pennant Hills and West Pennant Hills. There were 44,961 electors enrolled in the district at the 1999 state election.

The Hills electorate was first contested in 1962. It was created from the northern part of Blacktown, a southern part of Hornsby and the northern part of Eastwood, in the Liberals' traditional heartland of northern Sydney, and as such was a comfortably safe Liberal seat, tending to have long-serving members throughout its history, only having seen four members in more than forty years. Max Ruddock held the seat from 1962 until his death in 1976, and was replaced by local mayor Fred Caterson, who won more than 70% of the vote in the subsequent by-election. Caterson suffered a large swing in the "Wranslide" of 1978, but even then managed to win an outright majority on the first count. It was one of only two times that the Liberals were seriously threatened in this seat. In 1962, Ruddock was nearly defeated by an independent Liberal when the seat was first contested.

The seat reverted to form, and Caterson held it comfortably until 1990, when he retired and was replaced by used car dealer Tony Packard. In contrast to his predecessors, Packard only lasted three years, and resigned amidst scandal in 1993. Although there was some speculation that the Liberal Party would lose the ensuing 1993 by-election, Liberal candidate Michael Richardson won easily and was handily returned in the next three elections.

The district was abolished from the 2007 state election as a result of the 2004 electoral redistribution. Richardson followed most of the electorate to the new electorate of Castle Hill, with the remaining territory being split between Hawkesbury, Hornsby and Epping.

== Members ==
Member	Party	Period
Max Ruddock	Liberal	1962–1976
Fred Caterson	Liberal	1976–1990
Tony Packard	Liberal	1990–1993
Michael Richardson	Liberal	1993–2007

== Election results ==
2003 New South Wales state election: The Hills
Party	Candidate	Votes	%	±%
Liberal	Michael Richardson	25,574	50.4	−0.7
Labor	Anthony Ellard	14,488	28.6	+3.3
Greens	Jocelyn Howden	3,289	6.5	+3.8
Independent	Rob Stanton	2,368	4.7	+4.7
Christian Democrats	Ken Gregory	2,293	4.5	−0.8
Unity	Robert McLeod	1,441	2.8	−1.2
Against Further Immigration	Albert Dowman	650	1.3	+0.3
Democrats	Kamran Keshavarz Talebi	619	1.2	−5.7
Total formal votes		50,722	98.0	+0.2
Informal votes		1,041	2.0	−0.2
Turnout		51,763	92.2	
Two-party-preferred result
Liberal	Michael Richardson	27,536	61.6	−3.1
Labor	Anthony Ellard	17,174	38.4	+3.1
Liberal hold		Swing	−3.1	
