= Members of the New South Wales Legislative Assembly, 1995–1999 =

Members of the New South Wales Legislative Assembly who served in the 51st parliament held their seats from 1995 to 1999. They were elected at the 1995 state election, and at by-elections. The Speaker was John Murray.

Name	Party	Electorate	Term in office
Pam Allan	Labor	Blacktown	1988–2007
Richard Amery	Labor	Mount Druitt	1983–2015
Jim Anderson	Labor	St Marys	1995–2003
Marie Andrews	Labor	Peats	1995–2011
John Aquilina	Labor	Riverstone	1981–2011
Ian Armstrong	National	Lachlan	1981–2007
Diane Beamer	Labor	Badgerys Creek	1995–2011
Don Beck	National	Murwillumbah	1984–1999
Bill Beckroge	Labor	Broken Hill	1981–1999
Peter Blackmore	Liberal	Maitland	1981–1999
John Brogden (Note: Pittwater Liberal MLA Jim Longley resigned on 20 March 1996. Liberal candidate John Brogden won the resulting by-election on 25 May.)	Liberal	Pittwater	1996–2005
Bob Carr	Labor	Maroubra	1983–2005
Ian Causley (Note: Clarence National MLA Ian Causley resigned on 1 February 1996 in order to contest the federal seat of Page at the 1996 election. Labor candidate Harry Woods won the resulting by-election on 25 May.)	National	Clarence	1984–1996
Ray Chappell	National	Northern Tablelands	1987–1999
Kerry Chikarovski	Liberal	Lane Cove	1991–2003
Mick Clough	Labor	Bathurst	1976–1988, 1991–1999
Peter Cochran (Note: Monaro National MLA Peter Cochran resigned on 26 October 1998. No by-election was held, as the March 1999 state election was only five months away.)	National	Monaro	1988–1998
Peter Collins	Liberal	Willoughby	1981–2003
Paul Crittenden	Labor	Wyong	1991–2007
Adrian Cruickshank	National	Murrumbidgee	1984–1999
Peter Debnam	Liberal	Vaucluse	1994–2011
Bob Debus	Labor	Blue Mountains	1981–1988, 1995–2007
Chris Downy (Note: Sutherland Liberal MLA Chris Downy resigned on 12 February 1997. Liberal candidate Lorna Stone won the resulting by-election on 20 December.)	Liberal	Sutherland	1988–1997
Eric Ellis	Liberal	South Coast	1995–1999
Richard Face	Labor	Charlestown	1972–2003
John Fahey (Note: Southern Highlands Liberal MLA John Fahey resigned on 1 February 1996 in order to contest the federal seat of Macarthur at the 1996 election. Liberal candidate Peta Seaton won the resulting by-election on 25 May.)	Liberal	Southern Highlands	1984–1996
Marie Ficarra	Liberal	Georges River	1995–1999
Andrew Fraser	National	Coffs Harbour	1990–2019
Bryce Gaudry	Labor	Newcastle	1991–2007
Paul Gibson	Labor	Londonderry	1988–2011
Ian Glachan	Liberal	Albury	1988–2003
Deirdre Grusovin	Labor	Heffron	1990–2003
Jill Hall (Note: Swansea Labor MLA Jill Hall resigned on 1 September 1998 in order to contest the federal seat of Shortland at the 1998 election. No by-election was held, as the March 1999 state election was only six months away.)	Labor	Swansea	1995–1998
Bob Harrison	Labor	Kiama	1986–1999
Gabrielle Harrison	Labor	Parramatta	1994–2003
Chris Hartcher	Liberal	Gosford	1988–2015
Brad Hazzard	Liberal	Wakehurst	1991–2023
Andrew Humpherson	Liberal	Davidson	1992–2007
Jeff Hunter	Labor	Lake Macquarie	1991–2007
Morris Iemma	Labor	Hurstville	1991–2008
Bruce Jeffery	National	Oxley	1984–1999
Liz Kernohan	Liberal	Camden	1991–2003
Malcolm Kerr	Liberal	Cronulla	1984–2011
Jeremy Kinross	Liberal	Gordon	1992–1999
Michael Knight	Labor	Campbelltown	1981–2003
Craig Knowles	Labor	Moorebank	1990–2005
Brian Langton	Labor	Kogarah	1983–1999
Faye Lo Po'	Labor	Penrith	1991–2003
Jim Longley	Liberal	Pittwater	1986–1996
Paul Lynch	Labor	Liverpool	1995–2023
Bruce MacCarthy (Note: Strathfield Liberal MLA Paul Zammit resigned on 1 February 1996 in order to contest the federal seat of Lowe at the 1996 election. Liberal candidate Bruce MacCarthy won the resulting by-election on 25 May.)	Liberal	Strathfield	1996–1998
Peter Macdonald	Independent	Manly	1991–1999
Wendy Machin (Note: Port Macquarie National MLA Wendy Machin resigned on 28 August 1996. National candidate Rob Oakeshott won the resulting by-election on 30 November.)	National	Port Macquarie	1985–1996
Col Markham	Labor	Keira	1988–2003
Bob Martin	Labor	Port Stephens	1988, 1988–1999
Grant McBride	Labor	The Entrance	1992–2011
Ian McManus	Labor	Bulli	1987–2003
Reba Meagher	Labor	Cabramatta	1994–2008
Wayne Merton	Liberal	Baulkham Hills	1988–2011
John Mills	Labor	Wallsend	1988–2007
Clover Moore	Independent	Bligh	1988–2012
Kevin Moss	Labor	Canterbury	1986–2003
John Murray	Labor	Drummoyne	1982–2003
Peter Nagle	Labor	Auburn	1988–2001
Stan Neilly	Labor	Cessnock	1981–1988, 1991–1999
Sandra Nori	Labor	Port Jackson	1988–2007
Rob Oakeshott	National	Port Macquarie	1996–2008
Stephen O'Doherty	Liberal	Ku-ring-gai	1992–2003
Barry O'Farrell	Liberal	Northcott	1995–2015
Don Page	National	Ballina	1988–2015
Ernie Page	Labor	Coogee	1981–2003
Gerry Peacocke	National	Dubbo	1981–1999
Ron Phillips	Liberal	Miranda	1984–1999
Michael Photios	Liberal	Ermington	1988–1999
John Price	Labor	Waratah	1984–2007
Andrew Refshauge	Labor	Marrickville	1983–2005
Michael Richardson	Liberal	The Hills	1993–2011
Bill Rixon	National	Lismore	1988–1999
Pat Rogan	Labor	East Hills	1973–1999
Kevin Rozzoli	Liberal	Hawkesbury	1973–2003
Terry Rumble	Labor	Illawarra	1988–1999
Joe Schipp	Liberal	Wagga Wagga	1975–1999
Alby Schultz (Note: Burrinjuck Liberal MLA Alby Schultz resigned on 31 August 1998 in order to contest the federal seat of Hume at the 1998 election. No by-election was held, as the March 1999 state election was only six months away.)	Liberal	Burrinjuck	1988–1998
Carl Scully	Labor	Smithfield	1990–2007
Peta Seaton	Liberal	Southern Highlands	1996–2007
Doug Shedden	Labor	Bankstown	1987–1999
Jillian Skinner	Liberal	North Shore	1994–2017
Ian Slack-Smith	National	Barwon	1995–2007
Jim Small	National	Murray	1985–1999
Russell Smith	Liberal	Bega	1988–2003
George Souris	National	Upper Hunter	1988–2015
Tony Stewart	Labor	Lakemba	1995–2011
Lorna Stone	Liberal	Sutherland	1997–1999
Gerry Sullivan	Labor	Wollongong	1991–1999
George Thompson	Labor	Rockdale	1991–2003
Andrew Tink	Liberal	Eastwood	1988–2007
Joe Tripodi	Labor	Fairfield	1995–2011
John Turner	National	Myall Lakes	1988–2011
Russell Turner (Note: Orange National MLA Garry West resigned on 7 March 1996. National candidate Russell Turner won the resulting by-election on 25 May.)	National	Orange	1996–2011
John Watkins	Labor	Gladesville	1995–2008
Garry West	National	Orange	1976–1996
Paul Whelan	Labor	Ashfield	1976–2003
Tony Windsor	Independent	Tamworth	1991–2001
Harry Woods	Labor	Clarence	1996–2003
Kim Yeadon	Labor	Granville	1990–2007
Paul Zammit	Liberal	Strathfield	1984–1996

== See also ==
- First Carr ministry
- Second Carr ministry
- Results of the 1995 New South Wales state election (Legislative Assembly)
- Candidates of the 1995 New South Wales state election
