= Results of the 1995 New South Wales Legislative Assembly election =

State election for New South Wales, Australia in March 1995

Party	Votes	%	+/–	Seats	+/–
Labor	1,408,616	41.26	▲2.21	50	▲4
Liberal	1,121,190	32.84	▼1.65	29	▼2
National	378,878	11.10	▲0.58	17	Steady
Independents	160,169	4.69	▼3.61	3	▼1
Democrats	97,166	2.85	▼2.51	0	Steady
Greens	87,862	2.57	▲1.31	0	Steady
Call to Australia	49,317	1.44	▲0.25	0	Steady
Others	110,564	3.24	▲2.35	0	Steady
Total	3,413,762	100.00	–	99	–
Valid votes	3,413,762	94.85			
Invalid/blank votes	185,379	5.15	▼4.17		
Total votes	3,599,141	100.00	–		
Registered voters/turnout	3,837,102	93.80	▲0.18		
Source: NSW Parliament
Two-party-preferred
Labor	1,594,783	48.82	▲1.51		
Liberal/National Coalition	1,671,866	51.18	▼1.51		
Total	3,266,649	100.00	–		

This is a list of electoral district results for the 1995 New South Wales state election for members of the Assembly.

== Results by Electoral district ==
=== Albury ===
1995 New South Wales state election: Albury
Party	Candidate	Votes	%	±%
Liberal	Ian Glachan	20,443	58.6	−3.1
Labor	Darren Cameron	9,748	27.9	−5.1
Independent	Amanda Strelec	2,628	7.5	+7.5
Greens	Jill Pattinson	1,184	3.4	+3.4
Democrats	Ian McKenzie	650	1.9	+1.9
Independent	Peter Boardman	248	0.7	+0.7
Total formal votes		34,901	96.0	+3.2
Informal votes		1,461	4.0	−3.2
Turnout		36,362	92.8	−0.3
Two-party-preferred result
Liberal	Ian Glachan	22,077	66.3	+1.0
Labor	Darren Cameron	11,214	33.7	−1.0
Liberal hold		Swing	+1.0	

=== Ashfield ===
1995 New South Wales state election: Ashfield
Party	Candidate	Votes	%	±%
Labor	Paul Whelan	13,902	43.8	−5.4
Liberal	Morris Mansour	7,836	24.7	−8.5
No Aircraft Noise	Michelle Calvert	6,269	19.8	+19.8
Greens	Paul Fitzgerald	2,043	6.4	+6.4
Democrats	John Collins	1,202	3.8	−3.9
Call to Australia	Clay Wilson	482	1.5	−0.2
Total formal votes		31,734	93.5	+8.1
Informal votes		2,222	6.5	−8.1
Turnout		33,956	91.4	
Two-party-preferred result
Labor	Paul Whelan	18,561	65.2	+5.4
Liberal	Morris Mansour	9,895	34.8	−5.4
Labor hold		Swing	+5.4	

=== Auburn ===
1995 New South Wales state election: Auburn
Party	Candidate	Votes	%	±%
Labor	Peter Nagle	21,171	64.0	+2.2
Liberal	Camille Harb	9,945	30.1	+2.1
Call to Australia	Douglas Morrison	1,150	3.5	+3.5
Natural Law	Peter Catts	805	2.4	+2.4
Total formal votes		33,071	92.3	+6.8
Informal votes		2,765	7.7	−6.8
Turnout		35,836	93.8	−0.6
Two-party-preferred result
Labor	Peter Nagle	21,887	67.4	−0.7
Liberal	Camille Harb	10,587	32.6	+0.7
Labor hold		Swing	−0.7	

=== Badgerys Creek ===
1995 New South Wales state election: Badgerys Creek
Party	Candidate	Votes	%	±%
Labor	Diane Beamer	18,035	46.0	+3.2
Liberal	Anne Cohen	17,923	45.8	−3.1
Independent	John Thomson	1,365	3.5	+3.5
Citizen Opinion Law Order	Tony Caughey	1,012	2.6	+2.6
Call to Australia	Jonathan Grigg	840	2.1	+2.1
Total formal votes		39,175	95.1	+6.9
Informal votes		2,023	4.9	−6.9
Turnout		41,198	94.6	
Two-party-preferred result
Labor	Diane Beamer	19,150	50.1	+2.6
Liberal	Anne Cohen	19,043	49.9	−2.6
Labor gain from Liberal		Swing	+2.6	

=== Ballina ===
1995 New South Wales state election: Ballina
Party	Candidate	Votes	%	±%
National	Don Page	23,214	61.1	+4.9
Labor	Veronica Black	8,622	22.7	−2.7
Greens	Richard Staples	3,627	9.6	+9.6
Democrats	Nic Faulkner	1,736	4.6	−0.2
Environment Inds	Lorraine Mafi-Williams	767	2.0	+2.0
Total formal votes		37,966	97.2	+1.4
Informal votes		1,084	2.8	−1.4
Turnout		39,050	93.0	
Two-party-preferred result
National	Don Page	24,533	67.4	+4.1
Labor	Veronica Black	11,869	32.6	−4.1
National hold		Swing	+4.1	

=== Bankstown ===
1995 New South Wales state election: Bankstown
Party	Candidate	Votes	%	±%
Labor	Doug Shedden	21,747	63.5	+3.4
Liberal	Paul Barrett	10,875	31.7	−8.2
Democrats	Jeffrey Meikle	1,062	3.1	+3.1
Natural Law	Mike Smith	580	1.7	+1.7
Total formal votes		34,264	92.8	+16.3
Informal votes		2,660	7.2	−16.3
Turnout		36,924	94.4	
Two-party-preferred result
Labor	Doug Shedden	22,350	66.2	+6.2
Liberal	Paul Barrett	11,394	33.8	−6.2
Labor hold		Swing	+6.2	

=== Barwon ===
1995 New South Wales state election: Barwon
Party	Candidate	Votes	%	±%
National	Ian Slack-Smith	20,026	60.2	+9.3
Labor	Ted Stubbins	8,444	25.4	+0.5
Independent	Bevan O'Regan	2,468	7.4	−7.0
Environment Inds	Pat Jackson	1,258	3.8	+3.8
Independent	Jim Perrett	549	1.7	+1.7
Democrats	Gregory Cutlack	520	1.6	−8.3
Total formal votes		33,265	95.7	+2.4
Informal votes		1,488	4.3	−2.4
Turnout		34,753	93.3	
Two-party-preferred result
National	Ian Slack-Smith	22,158	70.1	+5.1
Labor	Ted Stubbins	9,429	29.9	−5.1
National hold		Swing	+5.1	

=== Bathurst ===
1995 New South Wales state election: Bathurst
Party	Candidate	Votes	%	±%
National	Trevor Toole	16,190	45.4	+45.4
Labor	Mick Clough	16,182	45.4	−2.8
Greens	Sharon Mullin	2,151	6.0	+6.0
AAFI	Carolyn O'Callaghan	1,134	3.2	+3.2
Total formal votes		35,657	96.7	+2.7
Informal votes		1,220	3.3	−2.7
Turnout		36,877	95.4	
Two-party-preferred result
Labor	Mick Clough	17,825	51.0	−4.1
National	Trevor Toole	17,136	49.0	+49.0
Labor hold		Swing	−4.1	

=== Baulkham Hills ===
1995 New South Wales state election: Baulkham Hills
Party	Candidate	Votes	%	±%
Liberal	Wayne Merton	20,644	58.9	−6.4
Labor	Tony Hay	9,946	28.4	+2.2
AAFI	Dale Elder	3,037	8.7	+8.7
Call to Australia	Tony Kassas	1,438	4.1	+4.1
Total formal votes		35,065	95.9	+5.2
Informal votes		1,517	4.1	−5.2
Turnout		36,582	95.6	
Two-party-preferred result
Liberal	Wayne Merton	22,605	67.5	−2.3
Labor	Tony Hay	10,895	32.5	+2.3
Liberal hold		Swing	−2.3	

=== Bega ===
1995 New South Wales state election: Bega
Party	Candidate	Votes	%	±%
Liberal	Russell Smith	21,653	58.7	0.0
Labor	John Boland	10,307	27.9	−2.3
Greens	Mark Blecher	2,529	6.9	+6.9
Democrats	Denise Redmond	1,484	4.0	−7.1
Call to Australia	David Howes	724	2.0	+2.0
Natural Law	Peter Fraser	209	0.6	+0.6
Total formal votes		36,906	96.4	+4.4
Informal votes		1,397	3.6	−4.4
Turnout		38,303	93.3	
Two-party-preferred result
Liberal	Russell Smith	22,769	63.7	+0.9
Labor	John Boland	12,981	36.3	−0.9
Liberal hold		Swing	+0.9	

=== Blacktown ===
1995 New South Wales state election: Blacktown
Party	Candidate	Votes	%	±%
Labor	Pam Allan	17,654	52.6	+2.4
Liberal	Ross Roberts	10,982	32.7	+0.7
AAFI	Warwick Tyler	2,061	6.1	+6.1
Independent	Ray Owen	1,653	4.9	+4.9
Call to Australia	Bob Bawden	1,199	3.6	+1.0
Total formal votes		33,549	93.6	+6.2
Informal votes		2,312	6.4	−6.2
Turnout		35,861	94.3	
Two-party-preferred result
Labor	Pam Allan	19,340	60.6	+2.3
Liberal	Ross Roberts	12,574	39.4	−2.3
Labor hold		Swing	+2.3	

=== Bligh ===
1995 New South Wales state election: Bligh
Party	Candidate	Votes	%	±%
Liberal	James Fisher	13,636	40.1	−0.1
Independent	Clover Moore	12,356	36.3	−7.4
Labor	Susan Harben	6,191	18.2	+2.1
Greens	Virginia Milson	1,697	5.0	+5.0
Natural Law	Machael Lippmann	142	0.4	+0.4
Total formal votes		34,022	96.3	+4.8
Informal votes		1,300	3.7	−4.8
Turnout		35,322	87.8	
Two-candidate-preferred result
Independent	Clover Moore	17,886	55.5	−0.6
Liberal	James Fisher	14,359	44.5	+0.6
Independent hold		Swing	−0.6	

=== Blue Mountains ===
1995 New South Wales state election: Blue Mountains
Party	Candidate	Votes	%	±%
Labor	Bob Debus	13,412	37.4	+1.1
Liberal	Jennifer Scott	9,860	27.5	−14.4
Independent	Barry Morris	5,951	16.6	+16.6
Democrats	Jon Rickard	2,489	6.9	−1.8
Independent	Carol Gaul	2,136	6.0	+6.0
Call to Australia	Warren Kinny	1,430	4.0	−0.1
Independent	William Mulcahy	303	0.8	−1.5
Natural Law	Stephanie Chambers	180	0.5	+0.5
Independent	Bert Ackland	93	0.3	+0.3
Total formal votes		35,854	96.8	+2.4
Informal votes		1,193	3.2	−2.4
Turnout		37,047	97.4	
Two-party-preferred result
Labor	Bob Debus	17,227	52.5	+5.2
Liberal	Jennifer Scott	15,577	47.5	−5.2
Labor gain from Liberal		Swing	+5.2	

=== Broken Hill ===
1995 New South Wales state election: Broken Hill
Party	Candidate	Votes	%	±%
Labor	Bill Beckroge	16,292	52.8	−0.4
National	Mark Kersten	13,236	42.9	+14.1
Independent	Gordon Dansie	1,324	4.3	+4.3
Total formal votes		30,852	94.2	+3.8
Informal votes		1,889	5.8	−3.8
Turnout		32,741	90.0	
Two-party-preferred result
Labor	Bill Beckroge	16,677	54.7	−5.3
National	Mark Kersten	13,804	45.3	+5.3
Labor hold		Swing	−5.3	

=== Bulli ===
1995 New South Wales state election: Bulli
Party	Candidate	Votes	%	±%
Labor	Ian McManus	18,137	50.8	−1.4
Liberal	Roy Stanton	11,860	33.2	+2.2
Greens	Steve Allen	4,193	11.7	+4.0
Call to Australia	Nicole White	1,544	4.3	+0.9
Total formal votes		35,734	96.2	+2.2
Informal votes		1,421	3.8	−2.2
Turnout		37,155	94.8	
Two-party-preferred result
Labor	Ian McManus	21,006	61.3	−1.9
Liberal	Roy Stanton	13,263	38.7	+1.9
Labor hold		Swing	−1.9	

=== Burrinjuck ===
1995 New South Wales state election: Burrinjuck
Party	Candidate	Votes	%	±%
Liberal	Alby Schultz	20,487	59.9	+1.0
Labor	Michael McManus	13,732	40.1	−1.0
Total formal votes		34,219	93.9	+7.8
Informal votes		2,242	6.1	−7.8
Turnout		36,461	95.1	
Liberal hold		Swing	+1.0	

=== Cabramatta ===
1995 New South Wales state election: Cabramatta
Party	Candidate	Votes	%	±%
Labor	Reba Meagher	23,058	65.4	+13.7
Liberal	Rocky Gattellari	8,636	24.5	+2.7
Democrats	Dianela Reverberi	1,505	4.3	+2.6
Independent	Bob Aiken	1,151	3.3	+3.3
Citizen Opinion Law Order	Mick Horgan	907	2.6	+2.6
Total formal votes		35,257	90.3	+8.1
Informal votes		3,796	9.7	−8.1
Turnout		39,053	93.6	
Two-party-preferred result
Labor	Reba Meagher	24,174	71.2	+5.2
Liberal	Rocky Gattellari	9,755	28.8	−5.2
Labor hold		Swing	+5.2	

=== Camden ===
1995 New South Wales state election: Camden
Party	Candidate	Votes	%	±%
Liberal	Liz Kernohan	19,555	46.2	−1.6
Labor	Peter Primrose	16,637	39.3	−3.3
Greens	Vicky Kearney	1,923	4.5	+4.5
Independent	Jim McKenzie	1,592	3.8	+3.8
Call to Australia	James Whitehall	1,072	2.5	+2.5
Citizens Opinion Law Order	Ann Light	889	2.1	+2.1
Independent	Carolyn Allport	674	1.6	+1.6
Total formal votes		42,342	95.8	+6.1
Informal votes		1,849	4.2	−6.1
Turnout		44,191	95.4	
Two-party-preferred result
Liberal	Liz Kernohan	20,963	52.6	+1.1
Labor	Peter Primrose	18,896	47.4	−1.1
Liberal hold		Swing	+1.1	

=== Campbelltown ===
1995 New South Wales state election: Campbelltown
Party	Candidate	Votes	%	±%
Labor	Michael Knight	17,431	51.0	−4.1
Liberal	Anthony Roberts	10,416	30.5	−5.6
AAFI	Janey Woodger	2,995	8.8	+8.8
Democrats	David Bailey	1,470	4.3	−4.7
Call to Australia	Jason Hando	1,162	3.4	+3.4
Socialist Labour	Mike Head	724	2.1	+2.1
Total formal votes		34,198	94.2	+8.5
Informal votes		2,107	5.8	−8.5
Turnout		36,305	93.6	
Two-party-preferred result
Labor	Michael Knight	19,469	61.8	+1.9
Liberal	Anthony Roberts	12,026	38.2	−1.9
Labor hold		Swing	+1.9	

=== Canterbury ===
1995 New South Wales state election: Canterbury
Party	Candidate	Votes	%	±%
Labor	Kevin Moss	18,792	56.5	+3.9
Liberal	Paul Terrett	11,527	34.6	−5.9
Independent	Shane Nicholls	1,077	3.2	+3.2
Democrats	Garry Dalrymple	1,014	3.0	−3.8
Transport Action Group	John Warrington	864	2.6	+2.6
Total formal votes		33,274	89.8	+5.1
Informal votes		3,793	10.2	−5.1
Turnout		37,067	95.9	
Two-party-preferred result
Labor	Kevin Moss	19,905	61.7	+4.9
Liberal	Paul Terrett	12,364	38.3	−4.9
Labor hold		Swing	+4.9	

=== Cessnock ===
1995 New South Wales state election: Cessnock
Party	Candidate	Votes	%	±%
Labor	Stan Neilly	18,680	55.5	+4.8
Liberal	Robert Symon	10,581	31.4	−9.9
Democrats	Simon Holliday	3,620	10.8	+6.4
Socialist Labour	Terry Cook	775	2.3	+2.3
Total formal votes		33,656	95.7	+4.3
Informal votes		1,516	4.3	−4.3
Turnout		35,172	94.0	
Two-party-preferred result
Labor	Stan Neilly	20,348	63.1	+8.7
Liberal	Robert Symon	11,888	36.9	−8.7
Labor hold		Swing	+8.7	

=== Charlestown ===
1995 New South Wales state election: Charlestown
Party	Candidate	Votes	%	±%
Labor	Richard Face	18,186	55.9	+1.4
Liberal	Trevor Bates	8,134	25.0	−4.3
Independent	Ivan Welsh	3,939	12.1	+12.1
Independent	Richard Hill	1,279	3.9	+3.9
Call to Australia	Jim Kendall	1,012	3.1	+0.9
Total formal votes		32,550	95.1	+2.9
Informal votes		1,660	4.9	−2.9
Turnout		34,210	94.0	
Two-party-preferred result
Labor	Richard Face	19,282	64.2	+1.1
Liberal	Trevor Bates	10,741	35.8	−1.1
Labor hold		Swing	+1.1	

=== Clarence ===
1995 New South Wales state election: Clarence
Party	Candidate	Votes	%	±%
National	Ian Causley	18,649	53.0	−0.5
Labor	John Lester	12,022	34.2	+5.3
Greens	Daryl Thompson	1,250	3.6	+3.6
Independent	Sally Haig	1,234	3.5	+3.5
Democrats	Peter Wrightson	1,062	3.0	−9.0
The Country Party	Jacqueline Godfrey	952	2.7	+2.7
Total formal votes		35,169	97.0	+2.0
Informal votes		1,105	3.0	−2.0
Turnout		36,274	94.4	
Two-party-preferred result
National	Ian Causley	19,726	58.3	−2.3
Labor	John Lester	14,113	41.7	+2.3
National hold		Swing	−2.3	

=== Coffs Harbour ===
1995 New South Wales state election: Coffs Harbour
Party	Candidate	Votes	%	±%
National	Andrew Fraser	19,296	53.0	+0.5
Labor	Bruce Clarke	11,064	30.4	−5.7
Independent	Sue Dethridge	2,945	8.1	+8.1
Greens	Mark Spencer	1,979	5.4	+5.4
Natural Law	Byron Rigby	500	1.4	+1.4
The Country Party	Ken Field	406	1.1	+1.1
Independent	Evalds Erglis	251	0.7	−0.7
Total formal votes		36,441	96.7	+1.4
Informal votes		1,232	3.3	−1.4
Turnout		37,673	93.9	
Two-party-preferred result
National	Andrew Fraser	20,361	58.7	+1.7
Labor	Bruce Clarke	14,326	41.3	−1.7
National hold		Swing	+1.7	

=== Coogee ===
1995 New South Wales state election: Coogee
Party	Candidate	Votes	%	±%
Labor	Ernie Page	15,002	44.5	+1.0
Liberal	Margaret Martin	13,013	38.6	−2.4
Greens	Murray Matson	3,131	9.3	+9.3
Democrats	Marie Brown	1,045	3.1	−1.9
AAFI	Shane Scevity	797	2.4	+2.4
Independent	Barry Doosey	472	1.4	+1.4
Natural Law	Jacinta Lynch	240	0.7	+0.7
Total formal votes		33,700	95.9	+2.2
Informal votes		1,426	4.1	−2.2
Turnout		35,126	91.4	
Two-party-preferred result
Labor	Ernie Page	17,924	56.1	+4.5
Liberal	Margaret Martin	14,024	43.9	−4.5
Labor hold		Swing	+4.5	

=== Cronulla ===
1995 New South Wales state election: Cronulla
Party	Candidate	Votes	%	±%
Liberal	Malcolm Kerr	16,925	49.3	−8.5
Labor	Noreen Solomon	9,847	28.7	−5.1
Independent	Byron Hurst	4,668	13.6	+13.6
AAFI	Peter Smith	1,103	3.2	+3.2
Democrats	Valerie Bush	1,077	3.1	−5.3
Call to Australia	Malcolm Smith	710	2.1	+2.1
Total formal votes		34,330	96.4	+4.3
Informal votes		1,288	3.6	−4.3
Turnout		35,618	93.9	
Two-party-preferred result
Liberal	Malcolm Kerr	18,928	59.8	−1.5
Labor	Noreen Solomon	12,734	40.2	+1.5
Liberal hold		Swing	−1.5	

=== Davidson ===
1995 New South Wales state election: Davidson
Party	Candidate	Votes	%	±%
Liberal	Andrew Humpherson	21,156	62.7	−2.7
Labor	Lee Morthorpe	6,523	19.3	+0.3
AAFI	Ian Weatherlake	2,393	7.1	+7.1
Greens	Peter Tuor	1,751	5.2	+5.2
Democrats	David Harcourt-Norton	1,721	5.1	−10.5
Natural Law	Louise Hargreaves	187	0.6	+0.6
Total formal votes		33,731	96.3	+4.4
Informal votes		1,309	3.7	−4.4
Turnout		35,040	93.9	
Two-party-preferred result
Liberal	Andrew Humpherson	22,983	72.8	+0.1
Labor	Lee Morthorpe	8,604	27.2	−0.1
Liberal hold		Swing	+0.1	

=== Drummoyne ===
1995 New South Wales state election: Drummoyne
Party	Candidate	Votes	%	±%
Labor	John Murray	14,020	40.9	−6.2
Liberal	Michael Megna	13,542	39.5	−2.9
No Aircraft Noise	Lew Hird	3,942	11.5	+11.5
Greens	Jenny Ryde	2,297	6.7	+2.3
Call to Australia	Robert Marotta	445	1.3	+1.3
Total formal votes		34,246	95.8	+3.7
Informal votes		1,493	4.2	−3.7
Turnout		35,739	94.1	
Two-party-preferred result
Labor	John Murray	16,680	52.2	−1.4
Liberal	Michael Megna	15,274	47.8	+1.4
Labor hold		Swing	−1.4	

=== Dubbo ===
1995 New South Wales state election: Dubbo
Party	Candidate	Votes	%	±%
National	Gerry Peacocke	21,980	63.9	+3.3
Labor	Bob Green	10,355	30.1	+1.1
Call to Australia	Bruce Johnstone	2,081	6.0	+1.8
Total formal votes		34,416	94.8	+2.1
Informal votes		1,889	5.2	−2.1
Turnout		36,305	93.8	
Two-party-preferred result
National	Gerry Peacocke	23,135	68.0	+1.1
Labor	Bob Green	10,903	32.0	−1.1
National hold		Swing	+1.1	

=== East Hills ===
1995 New South Wales state election: East Hills
Party	Candidate	Votes	%	±%
Labor	Pat Rogan	16,732	49.6	−4.5
Liberal	David Sparkes	8,964	26.6	−9.5
Independent	Max Parker	5,284	15.7	+15.7
AAFI	John Moffat	2,460	7.3	+7.3
Natural Law	Ann Hughes	269	0.8	+0.8
Total formal votes		33,709	95.3	+4.8
Informal votes		1,665	4.7	−4.8
Turnout		35,374	95.9	
Two-party-preferred result
Labor	Pat Rogan	19,039	60.7	+1.9
Liberal	David Sparkes	12,342	39.3	−1.9
Labor hold		Swing	+1.9	

=== Eastwood ===
1995 New South Wales state election: Eastwood
Party	Candidate	Votes	%	±%
Liberal	Andrew Tink	18,867	55.7	−6.7
Labor	Steve Gurney	8,981	26.5	+1.6
Greens	Alex Lepelaar	2,124	6.3	+6.3
Democrats	Chris Dunkerley	2,051	6.1	−2.7
AAFI	Rodney Smith	1,667	4.9	+4.9
Natural Law	Tim Carr	192	0.6	+0.6
Total formal votes		33,882	96.3	+2.9
Informal votes		1,306	3.7	−2.9
Turnout		35,188	93.6	
Two-party-preferred result
Liberal	Andrew Tink	20,649	64.2	−4.5
Labor	Steve Gurney	11,507	35.8	+4.5
Liberal hold		Swing	−4.5	

=== Ermington ===
1995 New South Wales state election: Ermington
Party	Candidate	Votes	%	±%
Liberal	Michael Photios	16,762	50.9	−5.0
Labor	Richard Talbot	11,864	36.1	+0.7
AAFI	John Hutchinson	2,312	7.0	+7.0
Democrats	Betty Endean	1,963	6.0	−2.7
Total formal votes		32,901	95.2	+4.0
Informal votes		1,662	4.8	−4.0
Turnout		34,563	93.7	
Two-party-preferred result
Liberal	Michael Photios	18,199	57.8	−1.8
Labor	Richard Talbot	13,271	42.2	+1.8
Liberal hold		Swing	−1.8	

=== Fairfield ===
1995 New South Wales state election: Fairfield
Party	Candidate	Votes	%	±%
Labor	Joe Tripodi	19,748	61.4	+6.2
Liberal	Frank Oliveri	9,491	29.5	−3.0
Democrats	Ron Cameron	1,766	5.5	+0.3
Natural Law	Linda Cogger	650	2.0	+2.0
Democratic Socialist	Mike Karadjis	487	1.5	+1.5
Total formal votes		32,142	90.2	+9.3
Informal votes		3,485	9.8	−9.3
Turnout		35,627	93.7	
Two-party-preferred result
Labor	Joe Tripodi	20,815	67.1	+5.7
Liberal	Frank Oliveri	10,218	32.9	−5.7
Labor hold		Swing	+5.7	

=== Georges River ===
1995 New South Wales state election: Georges River
Party	Candidate	Votes	%	±%
Liberal	Marie Ficarra	16,527	49.6	−2.9
Labor	Philip Sansom	11,070	33.2	+1.9
Independent	Milo Dunphy	2,370	7.1	+7.1
AAFI	John Justice	2,249	6.8	+6.8
Call to Australia	Chris McLean	1,096	3.3	+3.3
Total formal votes		33,312	95.7	+2.4
Informal votes		1,500	4.3	−2.4
Turnout		34,812	94.7	
Two-party-preferred result
Liberal	Marie Ficarra	18,175	58.0	−3.4
Labor	Philip Sansom	13,156	42.0	+3.4
Liberal hold		Swing	−3.4	

=== Gladesville ===
1995 New South Wales state election: Gladesville
Party	Candidate	Votes	%	±%
Liberal	Ivan Petch	14,182	41.7	−6.3
Labor	John Watkins	13,171	38.7	−3.1
No Aircraft Noise	Jane Waddell	3,196	9.4	+9.4
Democrats	Noel Plumb	1,960	5.8	−2.0
AAFI	Ken Malone	953	2.8	+2.8
Independent	Iris Knight	582	1.7	+1.7
Total formal votes		34,044	95.5	+4.5
Informal votes		1,615	4.5	−4.5
Turnout		35,659	93.7	
Two-party-preferred result
Labor	John Watkins	16,227	50.4	+3.3
Liberal	Ivan Petch	15,967	49.6	−3.3
Labor gain from Liberal		Swing	+3.3	

=== Gordon ===
1995 New South Wales state election: Gordon
Party	Candidate	Votes	%	±%
Liberal	Jeremy Kinross	22,928	68.0	−6.5
Labor	Jan Butland	4,174	12.4	+1.1
Democrats	Ann Barry	2,635	7.8	−2.6
Greens	Ross Knowles	2,009	6.0	+6.0
Stop Dual Occupancy	Tanya Wood	1,102	3.3	+3.3
Call to Australia	Margaret Ratcliffe	700	2.1	−1.8
Citizens Electoral Council	Leone Hay	156	0.5	+0.5
Total formal votes		33,704	96.8	+2.7
Informal votes		1,106	3.2	−2.7
Turnout		34,810	93.4	
Two-party-preferred result
Liberal	Jeremy Kinross	25,108	80.3	−3.3
Labor	Jan Butland	6,171	19.7	+3.3
Liberal hold		Swing	−3.3	

=== Gosford ===
1995 New South Wales state election: Gosford
Party	Candidate	Votes	%	±%
Liberal	Chris Hartcher	19,293	52.2	+3.3
Labor	Tony Sansom	14,841	40.2	+8.0
Independent	James Adams	1,423	3.9	+3.9
Democrats	Andrew Penfold	1,399	3.8	−0.9
Total formal votes		36,956	96.5	+2.4
Informal votes		1,330	3.5	−2.4
Turnout		38,286	94.7	
Two-party-preferred result
Liberal	Chris Hartcher	20,117	55.5	−1.3
Labor	Tony Sansom	16,153	44.5	+1.3
Liberal hold		Swing	−1.3	

=== Granville ===
1995 New South Wales state election: Granville
Party	Candidate	Votes	%	±%
Labor	Kim Yeadon	19,893	60.6	+4.2
Liberal	Les Osmond	10,086	30.7	−0.4
Call to Australia	John Ananin	2,151	6.5	+3.8
Natural Law	Lucia Van Oostveen	718	2.2	+2.2
Total formal votes		32,848	92.3	+4.7
Informal votes		2,754	7.7	−4.7
Turnout		35,602	93.4	
Two-party-preferred result
Labor	Kim Yeadon	20,467	64.5	+2.5
Liberal	Les Osmond	11,265	35.5	−2.5
Labor hold		Swing	+2.5	

=== Hawkesbury ===
1995 New South Wales state election: Hawkesbury
Party	Candidate	Votes	%	±%
Liberal	Kevin Rozzoli	21,086	57.6	−5.7
Labor	Barry Calvert	9,122	24.9	+4.1
Democrats	Adam Baczynskyj	3,042	8.3	+1.1
Call to Australia	Heather Kraus	2,271	6.2	+6.2
Confederate Action	Robin Philbey	1,095	3.0	+3.0
Total formal votes		36,616	95.1	+2.5
Informal votes		1,871	4.9	−2.5
Turnout		38,487	94.8	
Two-party-preferred result
Liberal	Kevin Rozzoli	23,765	68.5	−4.3
Labor	Barry Calvert	10,914	31.5	+4.3
Liberal hold		Swing	−4.3	

=== Heffron ===
1995 New South Wales state election: Heffron
Party	Candidate	Votes	%	±%
Labor	Deirdre Grusovin	20,611	61.5	+3.4
Liberal	Ben Franklin	9,435	28.1	−2.2
Greens	Mark Berriman	3,105	9.3	+1.8
Socialist Labour	Yabu Bilyana	370	1.1	+1.1
Total formal votes		33,521	92.9	+8.9
Informal votes		2,577	7.1	−8.9
Turnout		36,098	91.9	
Two-party-preferred result
Labor	Deirdre Grusovin	22,194	68.8	+3.1
Liberal	Ben Franklin	10,071	31.2	−3.1
Labor hold		Swing	+3.1	

=== Hurstville ===
1995 New South Wales state election: Hurstville
Party	Candidate	Votes	%	±%
Labor	Morris Iemma	18,771	57.1	+8.3
Liberal	Mick Frawley	12,759	38.8	−3.3
Independent	Saad Turk	1,369	4.2	+4.2
Total formal votes		32,899	93.6	+4.9
Informal votes		2,240	6.4	−4.9
Turnout		35,139	94.3	
Two-party-preferred result
Labor	Morris Iemma	19,410	59.6	+5.0
Liberal	Mick Frawley	13,131	40.4	−5.0
Labor hold		Swing	+5.0	

=== Illawarra ===
1995 New South Wales state election: Illawarra
Party	Candidate	Votes	%	±%
Labor	Terry Rumble	20,893	62.3	+1.0
Liberal	Sturt Guinness	7,620	22.7	−1.0
Democrats	Bob Patrech	2,792	8.3	−1.6
Call to Australia	Brian Hughes	2,243	6.7	+1.7
Total formal votes		33,548	93.2	−2.5
Informal votes		2,450	6.8	+2.5
Turnout		35,998	94.6	
Two-party-preferred result
Labor	Terry Rumble	22,531	70.5	+0.7
Liberal	Sturt Guinness	9,431	29.5	−0.7
Labor hold		Swing	+0.7	

=== Keira ===
1995 New South Wales state election: Keira
Party	Candidate	Votes	%	±%
Labor	Col Markham	18,346	55.3	+3.1
Liberal	Adam Cole	10,010	30.2	−3.0
Democrats	Jeff Warner	2,927	8.8	−0.2
Call to Australia	Robert O'Neill	1,885	5.7	+0.1
Total formal votes		33,168	94.4	+4.6
Informal votes		1,958	5.6	−4.6
Turnout		35,126	94.3	
Two-party-preferred result
Labor	Col Markham	20,293	63.9	+3.4
Liberal	Adam Cole	11,480	36.1	−3.4
Labor hold		Swing	+3.4	

=== Kiama ===
1995 New South Wales state election: Kiama
Party	Candidate	Votes	%	±%
Labor	Bob Harrison	20,385	54.3	+0.7
Liberal	Jason Collins	12,814	34.2	+1.4
Greens	Karla Sperling	4,319	11.5	+11.5
Total formal votes		37,518	94.3	+4.0
Informal votes		2,275	5.7	−4.0
Turnout		39,793	94.2	
Two-party-preferred result
Labor	Bob Harrison	22,472	62.2	+0.8
Liberal	Jason Collins	13,677	37.8	−0.8
Labor hold		Swing	+0.8	

=== Kogarah ===
1995 New South Wales state election: Kogarah
Party	Candidate	Votes	%	±%
Labor	Brian Langton	16,047	48.0	−1.5
Liberal	Margaret Dombkins	14,981	44.8	+0.2
Democrats	Craig Chung	1,664	5.0	−0.9
Call to Australia	David Copeland	713	2.1	+2.1
Total formal votes		33,405	95.0	+6.2
Informal votes		1,741	5.0	−6.2
Turnout		35,146	93.9	
Two-party-preferred result
Labor	Brian Langton	16,912	51.5	−1.8
Liberal	Margaret Dombkins	15,935	48.5	+1.8
Labor hold		Swing	−1.8	

=== Ku-ring-gai ===
1995 New South Wales state election: Ku-ring-gai
Party	Candidate	Votes	%	±%
Liberal	Stephen O'Doherty	20,271	57.1	−5.4
Labor	Elizabeth Priestly	7,067	19.9	+1.6
Independent	Mick Gallagher	5,932	16.7	+8.7
Democrats	Colin Ward	1,633	4.6	−4.5
Call to Australia	Alex Sharah	624	1.8	−0.5
Total formal votes		35,527	96.6	+2.9
Informal votes		1,251	3.4	−2.9
Turnout		36,778	93.8	
Two-party-preferred result
Liberal	Stephen O'Doherty	22,912	69.0	−3.7
Labor	Elizabeth Priestly	10,290	31.0	+3.7
Liberal hold		Swing	−3.7	

=== Lachlan ===
1995 New South Wales state election: Lachlan
Party	Candidate	Votes	%	±%
National	Ian Armstrong	23,560	69.4	+12.8
Labor	Tim Carney	8,578	25.3	−3.0
Democrats	Dave Cox	1,787	5.3	+1.6
Total formal votes		33,925	94.8	+2.2
Informal votes		1,843	5.2	−2.2
Turnout		35,768	95.3	
Two-party-preferred result
National	Ian Armstrong	24,303	72.4	+6.2
Labor	Tim Carney	9,248	27.6	−6.2
National hold		Swing	+6.2	

=== Lake Macquarie ===
1995 New South Wales state election: Lake Macquarie
Party	Candidate	Votes	%	±%
Labor	Jeff Hunter	20,723	60.1	+6.7
Liberal	Laurie Brewster	10,756	31.2	+3.3
Democrats	Lyn Godfrey	3,020	8.8	+1.9
Total formal votes		34,499	94.9	+3.2
Informal votes		1,865	5.1	−3.2
Turnout		36,364	94.6	
Two-party-preferred result
Labor	Jeff Hunter	21,864	64.8	+2.1
Liberal	Laurie Brewster	11,877	35.2	−2.1
Labor hold		Swing	+2.1	

=== Lakemba ===
1995 New South Wales state election: Lakemba
Party	Candidate	Votes	%	±%
Labor	Tony Stewart	19,115	58.4	+6.8
Liberal	Michael Hawatt	8,480	25.9	−6.1
Independent	John Gorrie	3,468	10.6	+10.6
Democrats	Amelia Newman	1,644	5.0	−3.6
Total formal votes		32,707	91.3	+7.1
Informal votes		3,135	8.7	−7.1
Turnout		35,842	92.8	
Two-party-preferred result
Labor	Tony Stewart	20,448	68.7	+9.3
Liberal	Michael Hawatt	9,304	31.3	−9.3
Labor hold		Swing	+9.3	

=== Lane Cove ===
1995 New South Wales state election: Lane Cove
Party	Candidate	Votes	%	±%
Liberal	Kerry Chikarovski	18,579	54.6	−12.9
Labor	Cheryl Lawrence-Rowe	5,542	16.3	−1.9
No Aircraft Noise	Peter Astridge	4,658	13.7	+13.7
Democrats	Matthew Baird	1,882	5.5	−8.7
Greens	Cameron Little	1,753	5.1	+5.1
Independent	Ian Longbottom	1,626	4.8	+4.8
Total formal votes		34,040	96.9	+4.1
Informal votes		1,082	3.1	−4.1
Turnout		35,122	92.0	
Two-party-preferred result
Liberal	Kerry Chikarovski	22,165	70.2	−3.5
Labor	Cheryl Lawrence-Rowe	9,396	29.8	+3.5
Liberal hold		Swing	−3.5	

=== Lismore ===
1995 New South Wales state election: Lismore
Party	Candidate	Votes	%	±%
National	Bill Rixon	19,292	57.8	+0.3
Labor	John Maxwell	8,260	24.8	−3.2
Independent	Prohibition End	2,457	7.4	+7.4
Independent	Cheryl Baxter	1,583	4.7	+4.7
Democrats	Allan Quartly	1,163	3.5	−2.8
The Country Party	John Spence	605	1.8	+1.8
Total formal votes		33,360	96.0	+1.7
Informal votes		1,408	4.0	−1.7
Turnout		34,768	93.8	
Two-party-preferred result
National	Bill Rixon	20,403	63.7	+1.4
Labor	John Maxwell	11,646	36.3	−1.4
National hold		Swing	+1.4	

=== Liverpool ===
1995 New South Wales state election: Liverpool
Party	Candidate	Votes	%	±%
Labor	Paul Lynch	24,042	69.1	+11.5
Liberal	Albert Galea	10,733	30.9	+7.1
Total formal votes		34,775	87.9	+2.4
Informal votes		4,774	12.1	−2.4
Turnout		39,549	92.3	
Labor hold		Swing	+2.6	

=== Londonderry ===
1995 New South Wales state election: Londonderry
Party	Candidate	Votes	%	±%
Labor	Paul Gibson	21,724	60.4	−3.7
Liberal	Vern McKenzie	10,869	30.2	−5.8
Citizens Opinion Law Order	Phillip Smith	1,994	5.5	+5.5
Call to Australia	Ian Rains	1,404	3.9	+3.9
Total formal votes		35,991	93.1	+15.3
Informal votes		2,679	6.9	−15.3
Turnout		38,670	92.9	
Two-party-preferred result
Labor	Paul Gibson	22,754	65.3	+1.3
Liberal	Vern McKenzie	12,093	34.7	−1.3
Labor hold		Swing	+1.3	

=== Maitland ===
1995 New South Wales state election: Maitland
Party	Candidate	Votes	%	±%
Liberal	Peter Blackmore	19,008	50.9	+14.2
Labor	Tony Keating	15,149	40.6	+4.1
Greens	Jan Davis	1,973	5.3	+5.3
Democrats	Mike Bellamy	1,208	3.2	−0.1
Total formal votes		37,338	96.7	+4.2
Informal votes		1,277	3.3	−4.2
Turnout		38,615	96.5	
Two-party-preferred result
Liberal	Peter Blackmore	19,863	54.1	+3.5
Labor	Tony Keating	16,851	45.9	−3.5
Liberal hold		Swing	+3.5	

=== Manly ===
1995 New South Wales state election: Manly
Party	Candidate	Votes	%	±%
Liberal	David Oldfield	15,343	44.5	−1.2
Independent	Peter Macdonald	13,092	38.0	+3.0
Labor	Brian Green	4,666	13.5	−2.2
Democrats	Peter Dee	877	2.5	−1.1
Call to Australia	John Swan	516	1.5	+1.5
Total formal votes		34,494	96.9	+3.3
Informal votes		1,117	3.1	−3.3
Turnout		35,611	93.8	
Two-candidate-preferred result
Independent	Peter Macdonald	16,676	50.4	−0.3
Liberal	David Oldfield	16,433	49.6	+0.3
Independent hold		Swing	−0.3	

=== Maroubra ===
1995 New South Wales state election: Maroubra
Party	Candidate	Votes	%	±%
Labor	Bob Carr	18,989	57.4	+0.1
Liberal	Shane Barber	11,030	33.3	−3.7
Greens	Rory Curphey	2,052	6.2	+6.2
Democrats	Andrew Larcos	1,015	3.1	−2.5
Total formal votes		33,086	94.9	+6.9
Informal votes		1,794	5.1	−6.9
Turnout		34,880	91.9	
Two-party-preferred result
Labor	Bob Carr	20,528	63.8	+3.0
Liberal	Shane Barber	11,646	36.2	−3.0
Labor hold		Swing	+3.0	

=== Marrickville ===
1995 New South Wales state election: Marrickville
Party	Candidate	Votes	%	±%
Labor	Andrew Refshauge	15,587	47.6	−7.3
No Aircraft Noise	Kevin Butler	7,748	23.6	+23.6
Liberal	Ken Henderson	4,346	13.3	−11.7
Greens	Bruce Welch	2,394	7.3	−5.7
Democrats	Keiran Passmore	1,798	5.5	−1.8
Democratic Socialist	Karen Fletcher	450	1.4	+1.4
Independent	Meira Kurfurst	442	1.3	+1.3
Total formal votes		32,765	94.4	+7.9
Informal votes		1,962	5.6	−7.9
Turnout		34,727	90.6	
Two-candidate-preferred result
Labor	Andrew Refshauge	18,022	60.5	−9.4
No Aircraft Noise	Kevin Butler	11,790	39.5	+39.5
Labor hold		Swing	−9.4	

=== Miranda ===
1995 New South Wales state election: Miranda
Party	Candidate	Votes	%	±%
Liberal	Ron Phillips	17,097	49.4	−7.4
Labor	Paul Smith	12,353	35.7	+0.7
Save Our Shire	Col Tallis	1,585	4.6	+4.6
AAFI	Beryl Perry	1,376	4.0	+4.0
Democrats	John Levett	1,257	3.6	−4.5
Call to Australia	Warwick Copeland	921	2.7	+2.7
Total formal votes		34,589	96.5	+4.7
Informal votes		1,257	3.5	−4.7
Turnout		35,846	94.7	
Two-party-preferred result
Liberal	Ron Phillips	18,623	56.7	−3.6
Labor	Paul Smith	14,239	43.3	+3.6
Liberal hold		Swing	−3.6	

=== Monaro ===
1995 New South Wales state election: Monaro
Party	Candidate	Votes	%	±%
National	Peter Cochran	20,641	58.8	−0.4
Labor	Bob Kemp	9,339	26.6	−5.4
Greens	Catherine Moore	2,657	7.6	+7.6
Call to Australia	John Ferguson	1,351	3.9	+3.8
Democrats	Mitch Tulau	1,103	3.1	−5.6
Total formal votes		35,091	95.8	+5.8
Informal votes		1,556	4.2	−5.8
Turnout		36,647	92.9	
Two-party-preferred result
National	Peter Cochran	22,267	66.2	+3.6
Labor	Bob Kemp	11,346	33.8	−3.6
National hold		Swing	+3.6	

=== Moorebank ===
1995 New South Wales state election: Moorebank
Party	Candidate	Votes	%	±%
Labor	Craig Knowles	20,004	54.2	+9.0
Liberal	Tony Pascale	11,267	30.5	−2.5
AAFI	John Woodbridge	2,681	7.3	+7.3
Independent	Terry Seacy	1,148	3.1	+3.1
Call to Australia	Michelle Jones	977	2.6	+1.0
Independent	Michael Allen	851	2.3	+2.3
Total formal votes		36,928	94.6	+6.3
Informal votes		2,112	5.4	−6.3
Turnout		39,040	93.7	
Two-party-preferred result
Labor	Craig Knowles	21,796	62.8	+8.4
Liberal	Tony Pascale	12,895	37.2	−8.4
Labor hold		Swing	+8.4	

=== Mount Druitt ===
1995 New South Wales state election: Mount Druitt
Party	Candidate	Votes	%	±%
Labor	Richard Amery	21,775	61.4	+6.6
Liberal	Jennifer Mackenzie	10,192	28.8	−0.2
Call to Australia	Joe Wyness	1,775	5.0	+1.8
Independent	Ivor F	1,706	4.8	+2.7
Total formal votes		35,448	93.0	+7.5
Informal votes		2,665	7.0	−7.5
Turnout		38,113	93.5	
Two-party-preferred result
Labor	Richard Amery	22,759	66.7	+3.7
Liberal	Jennifer Mackenzie	11,351	33.3	−3.7
Labor hold		Swing	+3.7	

=== Murray ===
1995 New South Wales state election: Murray
Party	Candidate	Votes	%	±%
National	Jim Small	24,495	77.6	+3.2
Labor	Peter Hargreaves	7,061	22.4	+6.2
Total formal votes		31,556	93.0	−1.6
Informal votes		2,371	7.0	+1.6
Turnout		33,927	89.6	
National hold		Swing	−3.8	

=== Murrumbidgee ===
1995 New South Wales state election: Murrumbidgee
Party	Candidate	Votes	%	±%
National	Adrian Cruickshank	20,222	60.2	+12.5
Labor	Tony Catanzariti	13,384	39.8	+10.5
Total formal votes		33,606	93.3	+0.2
Informal votes		2,415	6.7	−0.2
Turnout		36,021	95.6	
National hold		Swing	−1.6	

=== Murwillumbah ===
1995 New South Wales state election: Murwillumbah
Party	Candidate	Votes	%	±%
National	Don Beck	14,701	41.2	+4.3
Labor	Trevor Wilson	10,005	28.0	−1.7
Independent	Jade Hurley	8,139	22.8	+5.4
Greens	Samuelle Leonard	1,543	4.3	+4.3
Independent	John Diamond	665	1.9	+1.9
AAFI	Ken Harradine	359	1.0	+1.0
The Country Party	John Morrison	213	0.6	+0.6
Independent	Ron Evans	100	0.3	+0.3
Total formal votes		35,725	95.9	+0.6
Informal votes		1,511	4.1	−0.6
Turnout		37,236	92.8	
Two-party-preferred result
National	Don Beck	16,713	52.1	−1.0
Labor	Trevor Wilson	15,394	47.9	+1.0
National hold		Swing	−1.0	

=== Myall Lakes ===
1995 New South Wales state election: Myall Lakes
Party	Candidate	Votes	%	±%
National	John Turner	21,213	60.4	−1.0
Labor	Leellen Lewis	9,159	26.1	−1.3
AAFI	John Bridge	2,477	7.1	+7.1
Greens	Linda Gill	2,269	6.5	+6.5
Total formal votes		35,118	95.3	+1.6
Informal votes		1,736	4.7	−1.6
Turnout		36,854	94.8	
Two-party-preferred result
National	John Turner	22,781	68.4	−0.2
Labor	Leellen Lewis	10,531	31.6	+0.2
National hold		Swing	−0.2	

=== Newcastle ===
1995 New South Wales state election: Newcastle
Party	Candidate	Votes	%	±%
Labor	Bryce Gaudry	17,360	54.9	+4.8
Liberal	Suzanne Fleming	9,162	29.0	+8.3
Greens	Carrie Jacobi	4,370	13.8	+13.8
Democratic Socialist	Kamala Emanuel	736	2.3	+2.3
Total formal votes		31,628	95.2	+2.6
Informal votes		1,596	4.8	−2.6
Turnout		33,224	92.8	
Two-party-preferred result
Labor	Bryce Gaudry	20,107	66.1	+3.7
Liberal	Suzanne Fleming	10,310	33.9	+33.9
Labor hold		Swing	+3.7	

=== North Shore ===
1995 New South Wales state election: North Shore
Party	Candidate	Votes	%	±%
Liberal	Jillian Skinner	19,756	60.9	+9.8
Labor	Lynda Voltz	6,703	20.7	+12.8
Democrats	Linda Wade	3,039	9.4	+9.4
Greens	Mervyn Murchie	2,940	9.1	+9.1
Total formal votes		32,438	96.7	+2.3
Informal votes		1,107	3.3	−2.3
Turnout		33,545	91.1	
Two-party-preferred result
Liberal	Jillian Skinner	21,481	69.2	+16.7
Labor	Lynda Voltz	9,554	30.8	+30.8
Liberal hold		Swing	+16.7	

=== Northcott ===
1995 New South Wales state election: Northcott
Party	Candidate	Votes	%	±%
Liberal	Barry O'Farrell	20,747	60.1	−7.9
Labor	Andrew Leigh	8,178	23.7	+6.4
Democrats	Suzanne Reddy	3,589	10.4	−1.0
AAFI	Steve Van Wyk	2,034	5.9	+5.9
Total formal votes		34,548	96.5	+3.3
Informal votes		1,243	3.5	−3.3
Turnout		35,791	93.2	
Two-party-preferred result
Liberal	Barry O'Farrell	22,657	68.6	−7.8
Labor	Andrew Leigh	10,358	31.4	+7.8
Liberal hold		Swing	−7.8	

=== Northern Tablelands ===
1995 New South Wales state election: Northern Tablelands
Party	Candidate	Votes	%	±%
National	Ray Chappell	17,823	52.0	−2.6
Labor	Steve Funnell	8,284	24.2	−7.4
Independent	Joe Harrold	7,262	21.2	+21.2
Natural Law	Ruth Chant	923	2.7	+2.7
Total formal votes		34,292	95.7	+1.6
Informal votes		1,537	4.3	−1.6
Turnout		35,829	93.6	
Two-party-preferred result
National	Ray Chappell	20,373	63.7	+2.2
Labor	Steve Funnell	11,610	36.3	−2.2
National hold		Swing	+2.2	

=== Orange ===
1995 New South Wales state election: Orange
Party	Candidate	Votes	%	±%
National	Garry West	20,971	60.0	+9.7
Labor	Glenn Taylor	10,451	29.9	+14.4
Call to Australia	Bruce McLean	1,331	3.8	+1.5
Environment Inds	Barbara Eldershaw	1,197	3.4	+3.4
Independent	Robert Cianfrano	997	2.9	+2.9
Total formal votes		34,947	96.0	+1.4
Informal votes		1,450	4.0	−1.4
Turnout		36,397	95.0	
Two-party-preferred result
National	Garry West	22,623	66.4	+11.1
Labor	Glenn Taylor	11,439	33.6	+33.6
National hold		Swing	+11.1	

=== Oxley ===
1995 New South Wales state election: Oxley
Party	Candidate	Votes	%	±%
National	Bruce Jeffery	20,773	61.2	+3.8
Labor	Mary Murtagh	10,065	29.7	−4.0
Greens	Garry Graham	2,134	6.3	+6.3
Environment Inds	James Sanders	969	2.9	+2.9
Total formal votes		33,941	96.3	+2.6
Informal votes		1,319	3.7	−2.6
Turnout		35,260	93.8	
Two-party-preferred result
National	Bruce Jeffery	21,484	64.8	+3.3
Labor	Mary Murtagh	11,674	35.2	−3.3
National hold		Swing	+3.3	

=== Parramatta ===
1995 New South Wales state election: Parramatta
Party	Candidate	Votes	%	±%
Labor	Gabrielle Harrison	18,340	54.7	+10.4
Liberal	Damon Beck	12,089	36.0	−6.6
Call to Australia	Dee Jonsson	1,657	4.9	+4.9
Democrats	Eduardo Avila	1,097	3.3	−1.3
Natural Law	John Cogger	365	1.1	+1.1
Total formal votes		33,548	94.7	+4.5
Informal votes		1,863	5.3	−4.5
Turnout		35,411	93.9	
Two-party-preferred result
Labor	Gabrielle Harrison	19,275	59.2	+6.6
Liberal	Damon Beck	13,285	40.8	−6.6
Labor hold		Swing	+6.6	

=== Peats ===
1995 New South Wales state election: Peats
Party	Candidate	Votes	%	±%
Labor	Marie Andrews	18,788	52.7	−2.3
Liberal	Thomas Bojanic	13,491	37.8	+5.2
Independent	Bryan Ellis	3,401	9.5	+9.5
Total formal votes		35,680	95.2	+3.1
Informal votes		1,816	4.8	−3.1
Turnout		37,496	94.8	
Two-party-preferred result
Labor	Marie Andrews	20,131	58.4	−2.6
Liberal	Thomas Bojanic	14,329	41.6	+2.6
Labor hold		Swing	−2.6	

=== Penrith ===
1995 New South Wales state election: Penrith
Party	Candidate	Votes	%	±%
Labor	Faye Lo Po'	15,621	46.0	−1.6
Liberal	Jim Aitken	14,287	42.1	+1.7
Independent	Paul Quinn	1,612	4.7	+4.7
Call to Australia	Brian Grigg	1,229	3.6	+0.2
Democrats	Brooke Watson	1,197	3.5	−0.2
Total formal votes		33,946	95.9	+3.2
Informal votes		1,445	4.1	−3.2
Turnout		35,391	94.9	
Two-party-preferred result
Labor	Faye Lo Po'	17,421	52.8	−1.8
Liberal	Jim Aitken	15,578	47.2	+1.8
Labor hold		Swing	−1.8	

=== Pittwater ===
1995 New South Wales state election: Pittwater
Party	Candidate	Votes	%	±%
Liberal	Jim Longley	21,244	60.9	−5.4
Labor	Gary Sargent	6,631	19.0	+1.5
Greens	Chris Cairns	3,882	11.1	+11.1
Democrats	Peter Baker	1,503	4.3	−11.9
Call to Australia	Rick Bristow	1,070	3.1	+3.1
Independent	Ian Pash	532	1.5	+1.5
Total formal votes		34,862	96.1	+4.9
Informal votes		1,397	3.9	−4.9
Turnout		36,259	93.6	
Two-party-preferred result
Liberal	Jim Longley	23,381	70.8	−2.6
Labor	Gary Sargent	9,631	29.2	+2.6
Liberal hold		Swing	−2.6	

=== Port Jackson ===
1995 New South Wales state election: Port Jackson
Party	Candidate	Votes	%	±%
Labor	Sandra Nori	17,696	53.6	+2.9
No Aircraft Noise	Hall Greenland	6,496	19.7	+19.7
Liberal	Christine Bourne	6,085	18.4	+1.2
Independent	Denis Doherty	1,387	4.2	+4.2
Democrats	Matthew Piscioneri	1,059	3.2	+0.5
Call to Australia	Katherine Wood	281	0.9	+0.2
Total formal votes		33,004	96.3	+2.4
Informal votes		1,269	3.7	−2.4
Turnout		34,273	90.5	
Two-party-preferred result
Labor	Sandra Nori	19,564	63.6	−0.1
No Aircraft Noise	Hall Greenland	11,180	36.4	+36.4
Labor hold		Swing	−0.1	

=== Port Macquarie ===
1995 New South Wales state election: Port Macquarie
Party	Candidate	Votes	%	±%
National	Wendy Machin	19,175	52.6	−2.1
Labor	John Murphy	10,898	29.9	+7.4
Independent	Carl Lockwood	2,026	5.6	+5.6
Greens	Susie Russell	1,883	5.2	+5.2
Call to Australia	Daryl Stafford	952	2.6	+0.4
Environment Inds	Paul Conroy	869	2.4	+2.4
The Country Party	Steve Orr	621	1.7	+1.7
Total formal votes		36,424	96.4	+1.9
Informal votes		1,377	3.6	−1.9
Turnout		37,801	95.1	
Two-party-preferred result
National	Wendy Machin	21,068	61.7	−6.0
Labor	John Murphy	13,088	38.3	+6.0
National hold		Swing	−6.0	

=== Port Stephens ===
1995 New South Wales state election: Port Stephens
Party	Candidate	Votes	%	±%
Labor	Bob Martin	18,917	51.6	−2.9
Liberal	Tony McCormack	12,897	35.2	+6.5
Greens	Cathy Burgess	2,281	6.2	+6.2
Call to Australia	Sally Dover	1,446	3.9	+3.9
Democrats	Ronald Hellyer	1,104	3.0	−2.4
Total formal votes		36,645	94.3	+1.4
Informal votes		2,222	5.7	−1.4
Turnout		38,867	95.9	
Two-party-preferred result
Labor	Bob Martin	20,739	59.0	−1.1
Liberal	Tony McCormack	14,440	41.0	+1.1
Labor hold		Swing	−1.1	

=== Riverstone ===
1995 New South Wales state election: Riverstone
Party	Candidate	Votes	%	±%
Labor	John Aquilina	20,597	55.9	+4.3
Liberal	Ray Morris	12,675	34.4	−1.1
Democrats	Bill Clancy	2,282	6.2	+3.0
Call to Australia	Robert Bowden	1,294	3.5	+1.4
Total formal votes		36,848	94.2	+5.1
Informal votes		2,263	5.8	−5.1
Turnout		39,111	94.4	
Two-party-preferred result
Labor	John Aquilina	21,666	60.6	+3.1
Liberal	Ray Morris	14,070	39.4	−3.1
Labor hold		Swing	+3.1	

=== Rockdale ===
1995 New South Wales state election: Rockdale
Party	Candidate	Votes	%	±%
Labor	George Thompson	17,827	55.4	+4.7
Liberal	Graham Abel	11,541	35.9	−3.9
Democrats	Reagan Murphy	1,479	4.6	+1.2
Transport Action Group	Nola Taylor	1,324	4.1	+4.1
Total formal votes		32,171	92.9	+6.1
Informal votes		2,477	7.1	−6.1
Turnout		34,648	94.2	
Two-party-preferred result
Labor	George Thompson	19,134	61.2	+4.4
Liberal	Graham Abel	12,125	38.8	−4.4
Labor hold		Swing	+4.4	

=== St Marys ===
1995 New South Wales state election: St Marys
Party	Candidate	Votes	%	±%
Labor	Jim Anderson	20,131	63.2	+2.0
Liberal	Bill Anastasiadis	8,921	28.0	−2.4
Democrats	Suzanne Saunders	2,809	8.8	+0.4
Total formal votes		31,861	92.6	+3.0
Informal votes		2,533	7.4	−3.0
Turnout		34,394	94.2	
Two-party-preferred result
Labor	Jim Anderson	21,324	68.9	+2.4
Liberal	Bill Anastasiadis	9,645	31.1	−2.4
Labor hold		Swing	+2.4	

=== Smithfield ===
1995 New South Wales state election: Smithfield
Party	Candidate	Votes	%	±%
Labor	Carl Scully	21,530	60.3	+8.3
Liberal	Bob Robertson	11,711	32.8	−1.0
Democrats	Manny Poularas	2,442	6.8	+6.8
Total formal votes		35,683	91.9	+7.9
Informal votes		3,166	8.1	−7.9
Turnout		38,849	94.4	
Two-party-preferred result
Labor	Carl Scully	22,266	63.7	+6.7
Liberal	Bob Robertson	12,692	36.3	−6.7
Labor hold		Swing	+6.7	

=== South Coast ===
1995 New South Wales state election: South Coast
Party	Candidate	Votes	%	±%
Liberal	Eric Ellis	14,685	42.9	+14.4
Labor	Veronica Husted	9,904	28.9	+11.5
Independent	John Hatton (Note: Sitting Independent MP John Edward Hatton Sr retired. His son John Edward Hatton Jr contested the seat, after being advised by his father against a career in politics.)	6,487	18.9	−32.4
Greens	May Leatch	1,724	5.0	+5.0
Call to Australia	Glen Ryan	929	2.7	0.0
Independent	Margaret Hutton	540	1.6	+1.6
Total formal votes		34,269	95.9	+2.4
Informal votes		1,467	4.1	−2.4
Turnout		35,736	94.2	
Two-party-preferred result
Liberal	Eric Ellis	16,815	54.6	+22.9
Labor	Veronica Husted	13,959	45.4	+45.4
Liberal gain from Independent		Swing	+22.9	

The sitting member John Hatton (Independent) did not contest the election.

=== Southern Highlands ===
1995 New South Wales state election: Southern Highlands
Party	Candidate	Votes	%	±%
Liberal	John Fahey	19,421	54.6	+6.5
Labor	Ken Sullivan	11,584	32.5	−5.1
Greens	Kevin Watchirs	2,014	5.7	+5.7
Democrats	Greg Butler	1,619	4.5	−4.8
Call to Australia	Peter Simos	956	2.7	−2.3
Total formal votes		35,594	96.2	+4.4
Informal votes		1,400	3.8	−4.4
Turnout		36,994	95.3	
Two-party-preferred result
Liberal	John Fahey	20,886	60.4	+3.9
Labor	Ken Sullivan	13,711	39.6	−3.9
Liberal hold		Swing	+3.9	

=== Strathfield ===
1995 New South Wales state election: Strathfield
Party	Candidate	Votes	%	±%
Liberal	Paul Zammit	17,371	53.4	−1.9
Labor	Jane Timbrell	13,114	40.4	+3.8
Democrats	Troy Anderson	1,613	5.0	−3.1
Natural Law	Stephen Doric	402	1.2	+1.2
Total formal votes		32,500	94.6	+6.4
Informal votes		1,871	5.4	−6.4
Turnout		34,371	93.4	
Two-party-preferred result
Liberal	Paul Zammit	17,928	56.0	−3.3
Labor	Jane Timbrell	14,110	44.0	+3.3
Liberal hold		Swing	−3.3	

=== Sutherland ===
1995 New South Wales state election: Sutherland
Party	Candidate	Votes	%	±%
Liberal	Chris Downy	19,440	50.8	+1.5
Labor	Genevieve Rankin	14,284	37.4	−2.1
Independent	Bernie Clarke	2,988	7.8	+7.8
Call to Australia	Geoffrey Percival	1,520	4.0	+4.0
Total formal votes		38,232	96.4	+2.7
Informal votes		1,419	3.6	−2.7
Turnout		39,651	96.0	
Two-party-preferred result
Liberal	Chris Downy	21,165	56.4	+3.4
Labor	Genevieve Rankin	16,336	43.6	−3.4
Liberal hold		Swing	+3.4	

=== Swansea ===
1995 New South Wales state election: Swansea
Party	Candidate	Votes	%	±%
Labor	Jill Hall	18,846	52.7	+7.1
Liberal	Laurie Coghlan	10,977	30.7	+12.4
Independent	Mark Booth	5,947	16.6	+16.6
Total formal votes		35,770	95.2	+2.7
Informal votes		1,787	4.8	−2.7
Turnout		37,557	94.9	
Two-party-preferred result
Labor	Jill Hall	20,830	60.5	+4.1
Liberal	Laurie Coghlan	13,611	39.5	+39.5
Labor hold		Swing	+4.1	

=== Tamworth ===
1995 New South Wales state election: Tamworth
Party	Candidate	Votes	%	±%
Independent	Tony Windsor	28,433	82.2	+45.9
Labor	Christine Robertson	4,985	14.4	−1.2
The Country Party	John Tracy	1,186	3.4	+3.4
Total formal votes		34,604	96.5	+0.7
Informal votes		1,271	3.5	−0.7
Turnout		35,875	94.8	
Two-party-preferred result
Independent	Tony Windsor	29,088	84.8	+25.0
Labor	Christine Robertson	5,215	15.2	+15.2
Independent hold		Swing	+25.0	

=== The Entrance ===
1995 New South Wales state election: The Entrance
Party	Candidate	Votes	%	±%
Labor	Grant McBride	16,933	47.4	+4.3
Liberal	Doug Eaton	14,369	40.3	−5.9
AAFI	Roy Whaite	1,899	5.3	+5.3
Democrats	Glenice Griffiths	1,340	3.8	−2.1
Call to Australia	Graham Freemantle	1,158	3.2	+3.2
Total formal votes		35,699	96.0	+4.2
Informal votes		1,494	4.0	−4.2
Turnout		37,193	94.0	
Two-party-preferred result
Labor	Grant McBride	18,441	54.1	+4.3
Liberal	Doug Eaton	15,642	45.9	−4.3
Labor gain from Liberal		Swing	+4.3	

=== The Hills ===
1995 New South Wales state election: The Hills
Party	Candidate	Votes	%	±%
Liberal	Michael Richardson	26,126	69.1	+6.6
Labor	David Brooks	7,546	19.9	+7.5
Democrats	David Baggs	2,564	6.8	+2.5
Independent	Tony Pettitt	1,590	4.2	+4.2
Total formal votes		37,826	96.1	+2.3
Informal votes		1,521	3.9	−2.3
Turnout		39,347	93.7	
Two-party-preferred result
Liberal	Michael Richardson	27,564	75.3	+7.9
Labor	David Brooks	9,038	24.7	+24.7
Liberal hold		Swing	+7.9	

=== Upper Hunter ===
1995 New South Wales state election: Upper Hunter
Party	Candidate	Votes	%	±%
National	George Souris	23,421	69.0	+10.8
Labor	Pat Baks	10,521	31.0	−0.9
Total formal votes		33,942	93.0	+0.1
Informal votes		2,542	7.0	−0.1
Turnout		36,484	94.7	
National hold		Swing	+4.3	

=== Vaucluse ===
1995 New South Wales state election: Vaucluse
Party	Candidate	Votes	%	±%
Liberal	Peter Debnam	19,576	59.2	+4.1
Labor	Barbara Armitage	8,695	26.3	+8.9
Greens	Tom McLoughlin	3,331	10.1	+5.1
Democrats	Mary de Merindol	1,277	3.9	+0.4
Natural Law	Patricia Boland	212	0.6	+0.6
Total formal votes		33,091	95.8	+5.1
Informal votes		1,449	4.2	−5.1
Turnout		34,540	89.3	
Two-party-preferred result
Liberal	Peter Debnam	20,540	65.4	+2.4
Labor	Barbara Armitage	10,862	34.6	+34.6
Liberal hold		Swing	+2.4	

=== Wagga Wagga ===
1995 New South Wales state election: Wagga Wagga
Party	Candidate	Votes	%	±%
Liberal	Joe Schipp	19,566	56.1	−9.7
Labor	Col McPherson	12,227	35.0	+0.9
Independent	Jim Rees	3,103	8.9	+8.9
Total formal votes		34,896	95.2	+10.1
Informal votes		1,752	4.8	−10.1
Turnout		36,648	93.7	
Two-party-preferred result
Liberal	Joe Schipp	20,702	60.7	−5.1
Labor	Col McPherson	13,415	39.3	+5.1
Liberal hold		Swing	−5.1	

=== Wakehurst ===
1995 New South Wales state election: Wakehurst
Party	Candidate	Votes	%	±%
Liberal	Brad Hazzard	18,524	54.5	−0.9
Labor	Patricia Armstrong	10,152	29.8	+3.8
AAFI	David Kitson	2,163	6.4	+6.4
Democrats	Sylvia Adam	1,880	5.5	−2.0
Call to Australia	Lesley Maher	820	2.4	+2.4
Natural Law	Catherine Webster	479	1.4	+1.4
Total formal votes		34,018	95.5	+4.8
Informal votes		1,592	4.5	−4.8
Turnout		35,610	93.5	
Two-party-preferred result
Liberal	Brad Hazzard	20,188	62.9	+0.2
Labor	Patricia Armstrong	11,899	37.1	−0.2
Liberal hold		Swing	+0.2	

=== Wallsend ===
1995 New South Wales state election: Wallsend
Party	Candidate	Votes	%	±%
Labor	John Mills	21,454	62.5	+6.5
Liberal	Christine Nesbitt	12,881	37.5	+7.7
Total formal votes		34,335	92.6	+2.8
Informal votes		2,731	7.4	−2.8
Turnout		37,066	95.8	
Labor hold		Swing	−0.7	

=== Waratah ===
1995 New South Wales state election: Waratah
Party	Candidate	Votes	%	±%
Labor	John Price	20,975	65.7	+0.6
Liberal	Wayne Shoobridge	7,222	22.6	−1.9
Greens	Liz Rene	3,743	11.7	+11.7
Total formal votes		31,940	93.6	+5.4
Informal votes		2,166	6.4	−5.4
Turnout		34,106	95.4	
Two-party-preferred result
Labor	John Price	22,801	74.1	+3.1
Liberal	Wayne Shoobridge	7,972	25.9	−3.1
Labor hold		Swing	+3.1	

=== Willoughby ===
1995 New South Wales state election: Willoughby
Party	Candidate	Votes	%	±%
Liberal	Peter Collins	20,775	62.2	+4.9
Labor	Daniel Reiss	7,711	23.1	+10.5
Democrats	Peter Fraser	3,030	9.1	+6.2
AAFI	Michael Wiseham	1,866	5.6	+5.6
Total formal votes		33,382	95.2	+2.1
Informal votes		1,692	4.8	−2.1
Turnout		35,074	92.0	
Two-party-preferred result
Liberal	Peter Collins	22,522	70.0	+8.0
Labor	Daniel Reiss	9,654	30.0	+30.0
Liberal hold		Swing	+8.0	

=== Wollongong ===
1995 New South Wales state election: Wollongong
Party	Candidate	Votes	%	±%
Labor	Gerry Sullivan	18,610	58.9	+8.7
Liberal	Warren Steel	7,662	24.3	+13.7
Greens	Will Douglas	3,607	11.4	+6.1
Call to Australia	Valdis Smidlers	758	2.4	+1.1
Democratic Socialist	Chris Pickering	561	1.8	+1.8
Socialist Labour	Dragan Grijak	383	1.2	+1.2
Total formal votes		31,591	92.1	+4.5
Informal votes		2,710	7.9	−4.5
Turnout		34,291	93.1	
Two-party-preferred result
Labor	Gerry Sullivan	20,823	70.1	+11.5
Liberal	Warren Steel	8,887	29.9	+29.9
Labor hold		Swing	+11.5	

=== Wyong ===
1995 New South Wales state election: Wyong
Party	Candidate	Votes	%	±%
Labor	Paul Crittenden	20,748	58.7	+5.6
Liberal	Peter Richardson	14,584	41.3	+4.0
Total formal votes		35,332	93.6	+1.2
Informal votes		2,433	6.4	−1.2
Turnout		37,765	94.3	
Labor hold		Swing	−0.3	

== See also ==
- Results of the 1995 New South Wales state election (Legislative Council)
- Candidates of the 1995 New South Wales state election
- Members of the New South Wales Legislative Assembly, 1995–1999
