= Candidates of the 1995 New South Wales state election =

The 1995 New South Wales state election was held on 25 March 1995.

== Retiring Members ==
=== Labor ===
- Peter Anderson MLA (Liverpool)
- Tony Aquilina MLA (St Marys)
- Don Bowman MLA (Swansea)
- Wes Davoren MLA (Lakemba)
- Geoff Irwin MLA (Fairfield)
- Keith Enderbury MLC
- Delcia Kite MLC
- Judith Walker MLC

=== Liberal ===
- Bruce Baird MLA (Northcott)

=== National ===
- Wal Murray MLA (Barwon)

=== Independent ===
- Terry Griffiths MLA (Georges River) – elected as Liberal
- John Hatton MLA (South Coast)

== Legislative Assembly ==
Sitting members are shown in bold text. Successful candidates are highlighted in the relevant colour. Where there is possible confusion, an asterisk (*) is also used.

Electorate	Held by	Labor candidate	Coalition candidate	Democrats candidate	CTA candidate	Greens candidate	Other candidates
Albury	Liberal	Darren Cameron	**Ian Glachan** (Lib)	Ian McKenzie		Jill Pattinson	Peter Boardman (Ind); Amanda Strelec (Ind)
Ashfield	Labor	**Paul Whelan**	Morris Mansour (Lib)	John Collins	Clay Wilson	Paul Fitzgerald	Michelle Calvert (NAN)
Auburn	Labor	**Peter Nagle**	Camille Harb (Lib)		Douglas Morrison		Peter Catts (NLP)
Badgerys Creek	Liberal	Diane Beamer	**Anne Cohen** (Lib)		Jonathan Grigg		Tony Caughey (COLO); John Thomson (Ind)
Ballina	National	Veronica Black	**Don Page** (Nat)	Nic Faulkner		Richard Staples	Lorraine Mafi-Williams (EC)
Bankstown	Labor	**Doug Shedden**	Paul Barrett (Lib)	Jeffrey Meikle			Mike Smith (NLP)
Barwon	National	Ted Stubbins	Ian Slack-Smith (Nat)	Gregory Cutlack			Pat Jackson (EC); Bevan O'Regan (Ind); Jim Perrett (Ind)
Bathurst	Labor	**Mick Clough**	Trevor Toole (Nat)			Sharon Mullin	Carolyn O'Callaghan (AAFI)
Baulkham Hills	Liberal	Tony Hay	**Wayne Merton** (Lib)		Tony Kassas		Dale Eder (AAFI)
Bega	Liberal	John Boland	**Russell Smith** (Lib)	Denise Redmond	David Howes	Mark Blecher	Peter Fraser (NLP)
Blacktown	Labor	**Pam Allan**	Ross Roberts (Lib)		Bob Bawden		Ray Owen (COLO); Warwick Tyler (AAFI)
Bligh	Independent	Susan Harben	James Fisher (Lib)			Virginia Milson	Michael Lippmann (NLP); **Clover Moore*** (Ind)
Blue Mountains	Liberal	Bob Debus	Jennifer Scott (Lib)	Jon Rickard	Warren Kinny		Bert Ackland (Ind); Stephanie Chambers (NLP); Carol Gaul (Ind); **Barry Morris** (Ind); William Mulcahy (Ind)
Broken Hill	Labor	**Bill Beckroge**	Mark Kersten (Nat)				Gordon Dansie (Ind)
Bulli	Labor	**Ian McManus**	Roy Stanton (Lib)		Nicole White	Steve Allen	
Burrinjuck	Liberal	Michael McManus	**Alby Schultz** (Lib)				
Cabramatta	Labor	**Reba Meagher**	Rocky Gattellari (Lib)	Dianela Reverberi			Bob Aiken (Ind); Mick Horgan (COLO)
Camden	Liberal	Peter Primrose	**Liz Kernohan** (Lib)		James Whitehall	Vicky Kearney	Carolyn Allport (Ind); Ann Light (COLO); Jim McKenzie (Ind)
Campbelltown	Labor	**Michael Knight**	Anthony Roberts (Lib)	David Bailey	Jason Hando		Mike Head (SLL); Janey Woodger (AAFI)
Canterbury	Labor	**Kevin Moss**	Paul Terrett (Lib)	Garry Dalrymple			Shane Nicholls (Ind); John Warrington (TAG)
Cessnock	Labor	**Stan Neilly**	Robert Symon (Lib)	Simon Holliday			Terry Cook (SLL)
Charlestown	Labor	**Richard Face**	Trevor Bates (Lib)		Jim Kendall		Richard Hill (Ind); Ivan Welsh (Ind)
Clarence	National	John Lester	**Ian Causley** (Nat)	Peter Wrightson		Daryl Thompson	Jacqueline Godfrey (TCP); Sally Haig (Ind)
Coffs Harbour	National	Bruce Clarke	**Andrew Fraser** (Nat)			Mark Spencer	Sue Dethridge (Ind); Evalds Erglis (Ind); Ken Field (TCP); Byron Rigby (NLP)
Coogee	Labor	**Ernie Page**	Margaret Martin (Lib)	Marie Brown		Murray Matson	Barry Doosey (Ind); Jacinta Lynch (NLP); Shane Scevity (AAFI)
Cronulla	Liberal	Noreen Solomon	**Malcolm Kerr** (Lib)	Valerie Bush	Malcolm Smith		Byron Hurst (Ind); Peter Smith (AAFI)
Davidson	Liberal	Lee Morthorpe	**Andrew Humpherson** (Lib)	David Harcourt-Norton		Peter Tuor	Louise Hargreaves (NLP); Ian Weatherlake (AAFI)
Drummoyne	Labor	**John Murray**	Michael Megna (Lib)		Robert Marotta	Jenny Ryde	Lew Hird (NAN)
Dubbo	National	Bob Green	**Gerry Peacocke** (Nat)		Bruce Johnstone		
East Hills	Labor	**Pat Rogan**	David Sparkes (Lib)				Ann Hughes (NLP); John Moffat (AAFI); Max Parker (Ind)
Eastwood	Liberal	Steve Gurney	**Andrew Tink** (Lib)	Chris Dunkerley		Alex Lepelaar	Tim Carr (NLP); Rodney Smith (AAFI)
Ermington	Liberal	Richard Talbot	**Michael Photios** (Lib)	Betty Endean			John Hutchinson (AAFI)
Fairfield	Labor	Joe Tripodi	Frank Oliveri (Lib)	Ron Cameron			Linda Cogger (NLP); Mike Karadjis (DSL)
Georges River	Liberal	Philip Sansom	Marie Ficarra (Lib)		Chris McLean		Milo Dunphy (Ind); John Justice (AAFI)
Gladesville	Liberal	John Watkins	**Ivan Petch** (Lib)	Noel Plumb			Iris Knight (Ind); Ken Malone (AAFI); Jane Waddell (NAN)
Gordon	Liberal	Jan Butland	**Jeremy Kinross** (Lib)	Ann Barry	Margaret Ratcliffe	Ross Knowles	Leone Hay (CEC); Tanya Wood (SDO)
Gosford	Liberal	Tony Sansom	**Chris Hartcher** (Lib)	Andrew Penfold			James Adams (Ind)
Granville	Labor	**Kim Yeadon**	Les Osmond (Lib)		John Ananin		Lucia Van Osterveen (NLP)
Hawkesbury	Liberal	Barry Calvert	**Kevin Rozzoli** (Lib)	Adam Baczynskyj	Heather Kraus		Robin Philbey (CAP)
Heffron	Labor	**Deirdre Grusovin**	Ben Franklin (Lib)			Mark Berriman	Yabu Bilyana (SLL)
Hurstville	Labor	**Morris Iemma**	Mick Frawley (Lib)				Saad Turk (Ind)
Illawarra	Labor	**Terry Rumble**	Stuart Guinness (Lib)	Bob Patrech	Brian Hughes		
Keira	Labor	**Col Markham**	Adam Cole (Lib)	Jeff Warner	Robert O'Neill		
Kiama	Labor	**Bob Harrison**	Jason Collins (Lib)			Karla Sperling	
Kogarah	Labor	**Brian Langton**	Margaret Dombkins (Lib)	Craig Chung	David Copeland		
Ku-ring-gai	Liberal	Elizabeth Priestly	**Stephen O'Doherty** (Lib)	Colin Ward	Alex Sharah		Mick Gallagher (Ind)
Lachlan	National	Tim Carney	**Ian Armstrong** (Nat)	Dave Cox			
Lake Macquarie	Labor	**Jeff Hunter**	Laurie Brewster (Lib)	Lyn Godfrey			
Lakemba	Labor	Tony Stewart	Michael Hawatt (Lib)	Amelia Newman			John Gorrie (Ind)
Lane Cove	Liberal	Cheryl Lawrence-Rowe	**Kerry Chikarovski** (Lib)	Matthew Baird		Cameron Little	Peter Astridge (NAN); Ian Longbottom (Ind)
Lismore	National	John Maxwell	**Bill Rixon** (Nat)	Allan Quartly			Cheryl Baxter (Ind); Prohibition End (Ind); John Spence (TCP)
Liverpool	Labor	Paul Lynch	Albert Galea (Lib)				
Londonderry	Labor	**Paul Gibson**	Vern McKenzie (Lib)		Ian Rains		Phillip Smith (COLO)
Maitland	Liberal	Tony Keating	**Peter Blackmore** (Lib)	Mike Bellamy		Jan Davis	
Manly	Independent	Brian Green	David Oldfield (Lib)	Peter Dee	John Swan		**Peter Macdonald** (Ind)
Maroubra	Labor	**Bob Carr**	Shane Barber (Lib)	Andrew Larcos		Rory Curphey	
Marrickville	Labor	**Andrew Refshauge**	Ken Henderson (Lib)	Keiran Passmore		Bruce Welch	Kevin Butler (NAN); Karen Fletcher (DSL); Meira Kurfurst (Ind)
Miranda	Liberal	Paul Smith	**Ron Phillips** (Lib)	John Levett	Warwick Copeland		Beryl Perry (AAFI); Col Tallis (SOS)
Monaro	National	Bob Kemp	**Peter Cochran** (Nat)	Mitch Tulau	John Ferguson	Catherine Moore	
Moorebank	Labor	**Craig Knowles**	Tony Pascale (Lib)		Michelle Jones		Michael Allen (Ind); Terry Seacy (Ind); John Woodbridge (Ind)
Mount Druitt	Labor	**Richard Amery**	Jennifer Mackenzie (Lib)		Joe Wyness		Ivor F (Ind)
Murray	National	Peter Hargreaves	**Jim Small** (Nat)				
Murrumbidgee	National	Tony Catanzariti	**Adrian Cruickshank** (Nat)				
Murwillumbah	National	Trevor Wilson	**Don Beck** (Nat)			Samuelle Leonard	John Diamond (Ind); Ron Evans (Ind); Ken Harradine (AAFI); Jade Hurley (Ind); John Morrison (TCP)
Myall Lakes	National	Leellen Lewis	**John Turner** (Nat)			Linda Gill	John Bridge (AAFI)
Newcastle	Labor	**Bryce Gaudry**	Suzanne Fleming (Lib)			Carrie Jacobi	Kamala Emanuel (DSL)
Northcott	Liberal	Andrew Leigh	Barry O'Farrell (Lib)	Suzanne Reddy			Steve Van Wyk (AAFI)
Northern Tablelands	National	Steve Funnell	**Ray Chappell** (Nat)				Ruth Chant (NLP); Joe Harrold (Ind)
North Shore	Liberal	Lynda Voltz	**Jillian Skinner** (Lib)	Linda Wade		Mervyn Murchie	
Orange	National	Glenn Taylor	**Garry West** (Nat)		Bruce McLean		Robert Cianfrano (Ind); Barbara Eldershaw (EC)
Oxley	National	Mary Murtagh	**Bruce Jeffery** (Nat)			Garry Graham	James Sanders (EC)
Parramatta	Labor	**Gabrielle Harrison**	Damon Beck (Lib)	Eduardo Avila	Dee Jonsson		John Cogger (NLP)
Peats	Labor	Marie Andrews	Thomas Bojanic (Lib)				Bryan Ellis (Ind)
Penrith	Labor	**Faye Lo Po'**	Jim Aitken (Lib)	Brooke Watson	Brian Grigg		Paul Quinn (Ind)
Pittwater	Liberal	Gary Sargent	**Jim Longley** (Lib)	Peter Baker	Rick Bristow	Chris Cairns	Ian Pash (Ind)
Port Jackson	Labor	**Sandra Nori**	Christine Bourne (Lib)	Matthew Piscioneri	Katherine Wood		Denis Doherty (Ind); Hall Greenland (NAN)
Port Macquarie	National	John Murphy	**Wendy Machin** (Nat)		Daryl Stafford	Susie Russell	Paul Conroy (EC); Carl Lockwood (Ind); Steve Orr (TCP)
Port Stephens	Labor	**Bob Martin**	Tony McCormack (Lib)	Ronald Hellyer	Sally Dover	Cathy Burgess	
Riverstone	Labor	**John Aquilina**	Ray Morris (Lib)	Bill Clancy	Robert Bowden		
Rockdale	Labor	**George Thompson**	Graham Abel (Lib)	Reagan Murphy			Nola Taylor (TAC)
St Marys	Labor	Jim Anderson	Bill Anastasiadis (Lib)	Suzanne Saunders			
Smithfield	Labor	**Carl Scully**	Bob Robertson (Lib)	Manny Poularas			
South Coast	Independent	Veronica Husted	Eric Ellis (Lib)		Glen Ryan	May Leatch	John Hatton (Ind); Margaret Hutton (Ind)
Southern Highlands	Liberal	Ken Sullivan	**John Fahey** (Lib)	Greg Butler	Peter Simos	Kevin Watchirs	
Strathfield	Liberal	Jane Timbrell	**Paul Zammit** (Lib)	Troy Anderson			Stephen Doric (NLP)
Sutherland	Liberal	Genevieve Rankin	**Chris Downy** (Lib)		Geoffrey Percival		Bernie Clarke (Ind)
Swansea	Labor	Jill Hall	Laurie Coghlan (Lib)				Mark Booth (Ind)
Tamworth	Independent	Christine Robertson					John Tracy (TCP); **Tony Windsor*** (Ind)
The Entrance	Labor	**Grant McBride**	Doug Eaton (Lib)	Glenice Griffiths	Graham Freemantle		Roy Whaite (AAFI)
The Hills	Liberal	David Brooks	**Michael Richardson** (Lib)	David Baggs			Tony Pettitt (Ind)
Upper Hunter	National	Pat Baks	**George Souris** (Nat)				
Vaucluse	Liberal	Barbara Armitage	**Peter Debnam** (Lib)	Mary de Merindol		Tom McLoughlin	Patricia Boland (NLP)
Wagga Wagga	Liberal	Col McPherson	**Joe Schipp** (Lib)				Jim Rees (Ind)
Wakehurst	Liberal	Patricia Armstrong	**Brad Hazzard** (Lib)	Sylvia Adam	Lesley Maher		David Kitson (AAFI); Catherine Webster (NLP)
Wallsend	Labor	**John Mills**	Christine Nesbitt (Lib)				
Waratah	Labor	**John Price**	Wayne Shoobridge (Lib)			Liz Rene	
Willoughby	Liberal	Daniel Reiss	**Peter Collins** (Lib)	Peter Fraser			Michael Wiseham (AAFI)
Wollongong	Labor	**Gerry Sullivan**	Warren Steel (Lib)		Valdis Smidlers	Will Dougals	Dragan Grijak (SLL); Chris Pickering (DSL)
Wyong	Labor	**Paul Crittenden**	Peter Richardson (Lib)				

== Legislative Council ==
Sitting members are shown in bold text. Tickets that elected at least one MLC are highlighted in the relevant colour. Successful candidates are identified by an asterisk (*).

Labor candidates	Coalition candidates	Democrats candidates	Greens candidates	CTA candidates	Shooters candidates
1. **Michael Egan***; 2. **Ann Symonds***; 3. **Ron Dyer***; 4. **Paul O'Grady***; 5. **Johno Johnson***; 6. **Andy Manson***; 7. Patricia Staunton*; 8. Janelle Saffin*; 9. Lawrie Daly; 10. Tony Kelly; 11. Frank Mossfield; 12. Hatton Kwok; 13. Michael Samaras; 14. Terry Hare; 15. John Hatzistergos	1. **John Hannaford*** (Lib); 2. **Duncan Gay*** (Nat); 3. **Helen Sham-Ho*** (Lib); 4. **Stephen Mutch*** (Lib); 5. **Richard Bull*** (Nat); 6. **Jim Samios*** (Lib); 7. **Brian Pezzutti*** (Lib); 8. **John Jobling*** (Lib); 9. **Lloyd Coleman** (Nat); 10. Robyn Kerr (Lib); 11. Len Roberts (Nat); 12. Len Humphrey (Lib); 13. Rick Lewis (Lib)	1. **Richard Jones***; 2. Arthur Chesterfield-Evans; 3. Terri Richardson; 4. Simon Disney	1. Ian Cohen*; 2. Josephine Faith; 3. Leeza Dobbie	1. **Elaine Nile***; 2. Bruce Coleman; 3. Kevin Hume; 4. John Everingham; 5. Shirley Grigg; 6. Gamil Helmy; 7. Barry Lawrence	1. John Tingle*; 2. James Pirie; 3. Ted Orr; 4. Suzanne O'Connell; 5. Raymond Galea; 6. Chris Mitchell; 7. Daniel Radford
ABFFOC candidates	NAN candidates	Independents candidates	Smokers Rights candidates	DSE candidates	Enviro. Inds candidates
1. Alan Corbett*; 2. Erica Mackenzie	1. Larry Hand; 2. Jean Lennane; 3. Clare Archibald	1. Graeme Cordiner; 2. Fiona Jessop; 3. Rodney Burton	1. Mark Anthony; 2. Robert Mayfield	1. Tony de Govrik; 2. Dianne Siskos; 3. Kim de Govrik; 4. Vicki McElveney	1. Robert Cummins; 2. Tony Vlatko
Country candidates	COLO candidates	EFF candidates	AIP candidates	CEC candidates	Seniors candidates
1. David Kilvert; 2. Tony Douglas	1. Kevin Higgins; 2. Sandra Clogher	1. Eddie Azzopardi; 2. Alan Nobel	1. Una Walker; 2. Essy Coffey	1. Robert Butler; 2. Garth Harris	1. **Beryl Evans**; 2. Lorraine Welsh; 3. Warren Page
RMP candidates	DSL candidates	PHA candidates	AAFI candidates	CAP candidates	Grey Power candidates
1. Piet Baird; 2. Greg Hirst	1. Bruce Threlfo; 2. Helen Jarvis	1. Maureen Davidson; 2. Bill Hughes	1. Edwin Woodger; 2. Vivienne O'Callaghan	1. Nick Harvey; 2. Les Gillman	1. John Verheyen; 2. Richard Ross; 3. Olga Pickering
ASG candidates	NLP candidates	SDO candidates	Ungrouped candidates		
1. Lyn Carson; 2. Stuart White	1. Catherine Knoles; 2. Elizabeth Eager	1. Anthony Meaney; 2. Judyth Dowdell	Joan Manna; Frank Arkell		

== See also ==
- Members of the New South Wales Legislative Assembly, 1995–1999
- Members of the New South Wales Legislative Council, 1995–1999
