= Electoral results for the district of Sutherland =

Election results for Sutherland, New South Wales, Australia

Sutherland, an electoral district of the Legislative Assembly in the Australian state of New South Wales, had two incarnations, from 1950 until 1971 and from 1988 until 1999.

Election	Member	Party
1950	Cecil Monro	Liberal
1953	Tom Dalton	Labor
1956	Ian Griffith	Liberal
1959	Tom Dalton	Labor
1962	Tom Dalton	Labor
1965	Tom Dalton	Labor
1968	Tim Walker	Liberal
Second incarnation (1988–1999)
Member	Party	Term
1988	Chris Downy	Liberal
1991	Chris Downy	Liberal
1995	Chris Downy	Liberal
1997 by	Lorna Stone	Liberal

== Election results ==
=== Elections in the 1990s ===
==== 1997 by-election ====
1997 Sutherland by-election Saturday 20 December
Party	Candidate	Votes	%	±%
Liberal	Lorna Stone	16,687	45.46	−5.39
Labor	Christine Hawkins	12,674	34.53	−2.83
Christian Democrats	David Copeland	1,804	4.91	+0.93
Greens	Jo-Anne Lentern	1,710	4.66	
Against Further Immigration	Janey Woodger	1,567	4.27	
Outdoor Recreation	Glenn Druery	780	2.13	
Independent	David Hunt	557	1.52	
Independent	Geoff Moore	530	1.44	
Independent	David Harris	396	1.08	
Total formal votes		36,705	98.12	+1.70
Informal votes		702	1.88	−1.70
Turnout		37,407	84.59	−11.45
Two-party-preferred result
Liberal	Lorna Stone	18,950	56.23	−0.21
Labor	Christine Hawkins	14,752	43.77	+0.21
Liberal hold		Swing	−0.21	

Chris Downy (Liberal) resigned.

==== 1995 ====
1995 New South Wales state election: Sutherland
Party	Candidate	Votes	%	±%
Liberal	Chris Downy	19,440	50.8	+1.5
Labor	Genevieve Rankin	14,284	37.4	−2.1
Independent	Bernie Clarke	2,988	7.8	+7.8
Call to Australia	Geoffrey Percival	1,520	4.0	+4.0
Total formal votes		38,232	96.4	+2.7
Informal votes		1,419	3.6	−2.7
Turnout		39,651	96.0	
Two-party-preferred result
Liberal	Chris Downy	21,165	56.4	+3.4
Labor	Genevieve Rankin	16,336	43.6	−3.4
Liberal hold		Swing	+3.4	

==== 1991 ====
1991 New South Wales state election: Sutherland
Party	Candidate	Votes	%	±%
Liberal	Chris Downy	16,406	49.3	−0.1
Labor	Genevieve Rankin	13,127	39.4	+1.7
Independent	Lynette Farmer	1,997	6.0	+6.0
Democrats	June Young	1,749	5.3	+3.5
Total formal votes		33,279	93.8	−4.1
Informal votes		2,211	6.2	+4.1
Turnout		35,490	95.6	
Two-party-preferred result
Liberal	Chris Downy	17,244	53.0	−0.9
Labor	Genevieve Rankin	15,262	47.0	+0.9
Liberal hold		Swing	−0.9	

=== Elections in the 1980s ===
==== 1988 ====
1988 New South Wales state election: Sutherland
Party	Candidate	Votes	%	±%
Liberal	Chris Downy	14,490	48.3	+5.4
Labor	Maurie Keane	11,875	39.6	−13.4
Independent	Jean Manuel	3,632	12.1	+12.1
Total formal votes		29,997	97.9	−0.2
Informal votes		631	2.1	+0.2
Turnout		30,628	95.7	
Two-party-preferred result
Liberal	Chris Downy	15,476	52.5	+7.6
Labor	Maurie Keane	14,028	47.5	−7.6
Liberal notional gain from Labor		Swing	+7.6	

District recreated

==== 1968 - 1988 ====
District abolished

=== Elections in the 1960s ===
==== 1968 ====
1968 New South Wales state election: Sutherland
Party	Candidate	Votes	%	±%
Liberal	Tim Walker	13,707	49.3	+0.5
Labor	Tom Dalton	13,105	47.1	−0.9
Democratic Labor	William Goslett	1,002	3.6	+0.4
Total formal votes		27,814	97.5	
Informal votes		706	2.5	
Turnout		28,520	95.4	
Two-party-preferred result
Liberal	Tim Walker	14,403	51.8	+0.8
Labor	Tom Dalton	13,411	48.2	−0.8
Liberal gain from Labor		Swing	+0.8	

- Sutherland became a notionally Liberal seat at the redistribution.

==== 1965 ====
1965 New South Wales state election: Sutherland
Party	Candidate	Votes	%	±%
Labor	Tom Dalton	15,096	50.0	+3.7
Liberal	Tim Walker	14,145	46.8	+10.3
Democratic Labor	William Goslett	975	3.2	+1.6
Total formal votes		30,216	98.6	−0.3
Informal votes		430	1.4	+0.3
Turnout		30,646	95.7	−0.4
Two-party-preferred result
Labor	Tom Dalton	15,334	50.8	−4.7
Liberal	Tim Walker	14,882	49.2	+4.7
Labor hold		Swing	−4.7	

==== 1962 ====
1962 New South Wales state election: Sutherland
Party	Candidate	Votes	%	±%
Labor	Tom Dalton	12,697	46.3	−3.9
Liberal	Noel Walker	10,021	36.5	−9.2
Independent	Keith Bates	4,173	15.2	+15.2
Democratic Labor	Malcolm Towner	450	1.6	+0.3
Independent	John Mantova	86	0.3	+0.3
Total formal votes		27,427	98.9	
Informal votes		304	1.1	
Turnout		27,731	96.1	
Two-party-preferred result
Labor	Tom Dalton	15,207	55.5	+2.7
Liberal	Noel Walker	12,220	44.5	−2.7
Labor hold		Swing	+2.7	

=== Elections in the 1950s ===
==== 1959 ====
1959 New South Wales state election: Sutherland
Party	Candidate	Votes	%	±%
Labor	Tom Dalton	11,845	50.2	
Liberal	Keith Bates	10,783	45.7	
Communist	Alexander Elphinston	680	2.9	
Democratic Labor	Peter Keogh	299	1.3	
Total formal votes		23,607	98.5	
Informal votes		351	1.5	
Turnout		23,958	96.1	
Two-party-preferred result
Labor	Tom Dalton	12,449	52.7	
Liberal	Keith Bates	11,158	47.3	
Labor gain from Liberal		Swing		

The sitting member Ian Griffith (Liberal) successfully contested Cronulla.

==== 1956 ====
1956 New South Wales state election: Sutherland
Party	Candidate	Votes	%	±%
Liberal	Ian Griffith	14,812	52.5	+5.8
Labor	Tom Dalton	13,388	47.5	−5.8
Total formal votes		28,200	98.7	+0.3
Informal votes		377	1.3	−0.3
Turnout		28,577	94.6	+0.7
Liberal gain from Labor		Swing	+5.8	

==== 1953 ====
1953 New South Wales state election: Sutherland
Party	Candidate	Votes	%	±%
Labor	Tom Dalton	11,382	53.3	
Liberal	Cecil Monro	9,957	46.7	
Total formal votes		21,339	98.4	
Informal votes		336	1.6	
Turnout		21,675	93.9	
Labor gain from Liberal		Swing		

==== 1950 ====
1950 New South Wales state election: Sutherland
Party	Candidate	Votes	%	±%
Liberal	Cecil Monro	10,718	52.2	
Labor	Gough Whitlam	9,807	47.8	
Total formal votes		20,525	98.8	
Informal votes		251	1.2	
Turnout		20,776	93.8	
Liberal win		(new seat)		
