= Electoral results for the district of Ermington =

Election results for Ermington, New South Wales, Australia

Ermington, an electoral district of the Legislative Assembly in the Australian state of New South Wales was created in 1991 and abolished in 1999.

election	Member	Party
1991	Michael Photios	Liberal
1995	Michael Photios	Liberal

== Election results ==
=== Elections in the 1990s ===
==== 1991 ====
1991 New South Wales state election: Ermington
Party	Candidate	Votes	%	±%
Liberal	Michael Photios	17,498	56.0	+4.7
Labor	Margaret Blaxell	11,056	35.4	−7.2
Democrats	Cameron Ward	2,717	8.7	+2.5
Total formal votes		31,271	91.1	−6.0
Informal votes		3,038	8.9	+6.0
Turnout		34,309	93.5	
Two-party-preferred result
Liberal	Michael Photios	18,232	59.7	+5.1
Labor	Margaret Blaxell	12,324	40.3	−5.1
Liberal notional hold		Swing	+5.1	

Ermington was a new seat with a notional Liberal majority.

==== 1995 ====
1995 New South Wales state election: Ermington
Party	Candidate	Votes	%	±%
Liberal	Michael Photios	16,762	50.9	−5.0
Labor	Richard Talbot	11,864	36.1	+0.7
Against Further Immigration	John Hutchinson	2,312	7.0	+7.0
Democrats	Betty Endean	1,963	6.0	−2.7
Total formal votes		32,901	95.2	+4.0
Informal votes		1,662	4.8	−4.0
Turnout		34,563	93.7	
Two-party-preferred result
Liberal	Michael Photios	18,199	57.8	−1.8
Labor	Richard Talbot	13,271	42.2	+1.8
Liberal hold		Swing	−1.8	
