= 1995 New South Wales state election =

- 25 March 1995

All 99 seats in the New South Wales Legislative Assembly and 21 (of the 42) seats in the New South Wales Legislative Council 50 Assembly seats were needed for a majority
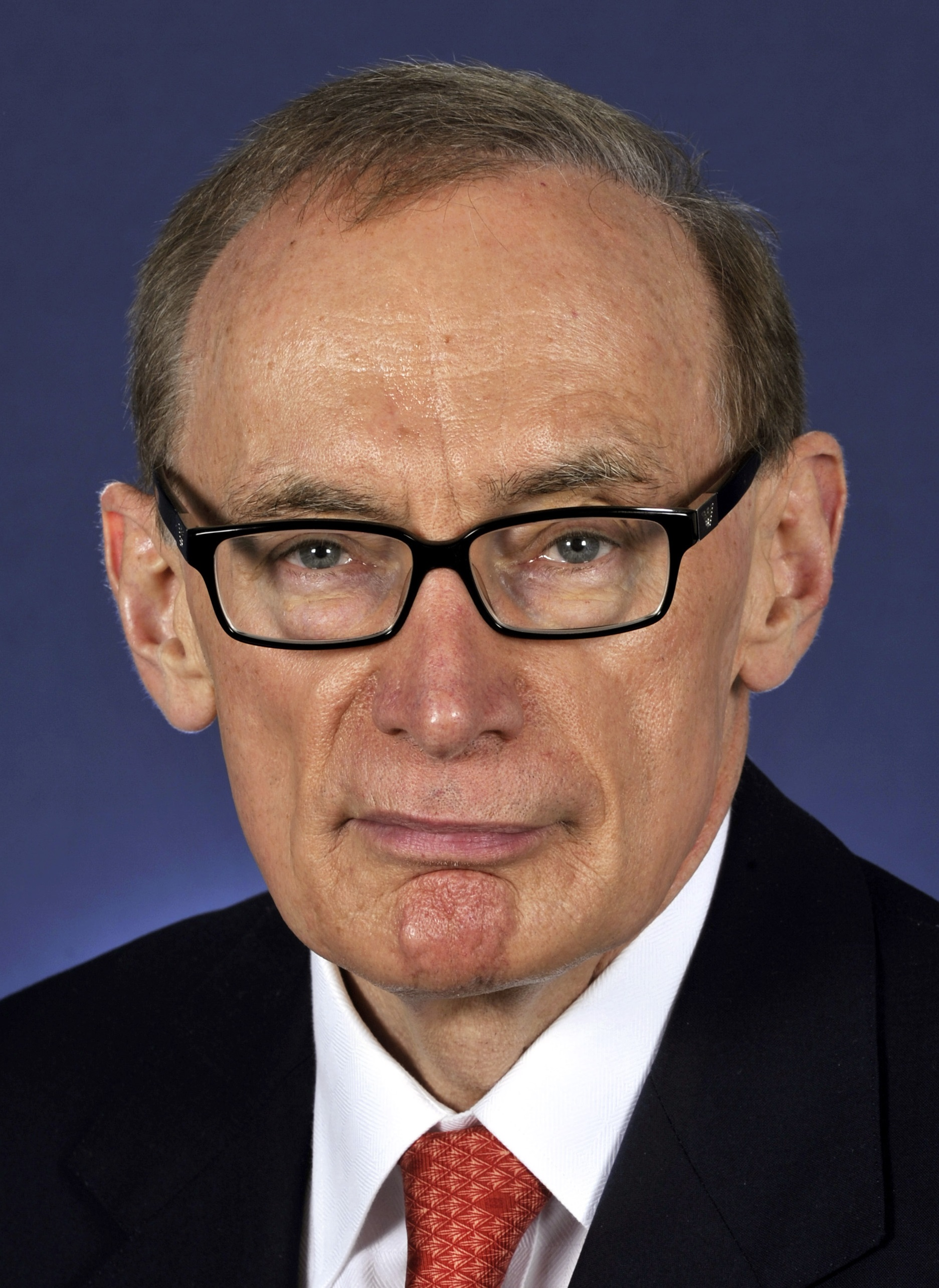

	First party	Second party
Leader	Bob Carr	John Fahey
Party	Labor	Liberal/National coalition
Leader since	6 April 1988	24 June 1992
Leader's seat	Maroubra	Southern Highlands
Last election	46 seats	49 seats
Seats before	47 seats	47 seats
Seats won	50	46
Seat change	▲3	▼1
Popular vote	1,408,616	1,500,068
Percentage	41.26%	43.94%
Swing	▲2.21	▼0.73
TPP	48.82%	51.18%
TPP swing	▲1.51pp	▼1.51pp
- Two-candidate-preferred margin by electorate
Premier before election
John Fahey
Liberal/National coalition
Elected Premier
Bob Carr
Labor

The 1995 New South Wales state election was held on Saturday 25 March 1995. All seats in the New South Wales Legislative Assembly and half the seats in the New South Wales Legislative Council were up for election. The minority Liberal Coalition government of Premier of New South Wales John Fahey was defeated by the Labor Party, led by Opposition Leader Bob Carr, who went on to become the longest continuously-serving premier in the state's history, before stepping down in 2005. Fahey pursued a brief career as a Federal Government minister.

It would not be until 2023, exactly twenty-eight years later, that Labor would again win a New South Wales state election from opposition.

== Background ==
=== 1991 election ===
Despite recording 52.7 per cent of the two-party preferred vote in 1991, the Coalition won only 49 of the 99 seats. The Coalition’s best results were in safe Liberal Party seats on Sydney’s North Shore while Labor won the battle in key marginal seats. Four seats that would normally have been held by the Coalition were won by Independents. Both John Hatton in South Coast and Clover Moore in Bligh were re-elected. They were joined by former National Party member Tony Windsor in Tamworth and local councillor Dr Peter Macdonald in Manly. Windsor quickly came to an accommodation with the Government, but the three non-aligned Independents used their position to negotiate a comprehensive memorandum of understanding. Signed in October 1991, it was a document that concentrated more on issues of accountability and process rather than specific policies. Most importantly, the agreement introduced fixed four-year parliamentary terms, a provision entrenched in the Constitution with 76 per cent support at a referendum called in conjunction with the 1995 election.

=== Second Coalition term ===
Having signed the agreement with the independents, the government found its position further eroded in October 1991 when Terry Metherell resigned from the Liberal Party without warning in a live television interview. In December, the Court of Disputed Returns overturned the Government’s victory in The Entrance. Labor won the subsequent by-election in January 1992.

What was to follow brought an end to the political careers of premier Nick Greiner and Environment Minister Tim Moore. A public service job was found for the disenchanted Metherell. The government was virtually certain to win his seat of Davidson at a by-election (which it subsequently did). However, Greiner and Moore found themselves before an Independent Commission Against Corruption (ICAC) investigation into the matter, with the inquiry making a finding of corrupt conduct against both. The independents who had been keeping the Coalition in office for the last year told Greiner that unless he resigned, they would withdraw their support from the Coalition and support a Labor no-confidence motion. Facing almost certain defeat in the Legislative Assembly, Greiner resigned, and Industrial Relations Minister John Fahey became the new Premier. The ICAC decision was later overturned in the courts, but by then Greiner and Moore had already resigned from Parliament.

A solicitor and former footballer, Fahey’s folksy style was very different from the aloof and precise Greiner, and a significant challenge to bookish Labor leader Bob Carr. Fahey established a strong public image, helped by his highly publicised victory leap when Sydney won the right to host the 2000 Olympics, and later when he crash-tackled an intruder who lunged at Prince Charles during a royal visit. As the economy improved, the Coalition slowly began to establish a lead in opinion polls.

Fahey's major problem was an accident prone Ministry and backbench. Several members in marginal seats attracted unwanted inquiries. Blue Mountains MP Barry Morris was disendorsed when he was revealed as the source of bomb threats against a local newspaper. Police Minister Terry Griffiths was forced to resign over sexual harassment allegations. Labor backed Independent John Hatton's long called for royal commission into the police, seeing it as another opportunity to embarrass the government.

The government's difficulty in handling these issues was due to the increased accountability created by its minority position in the Legislative Assembly. The agreement with the non-aligned Independents did not prevent the government from bringing forward and passing controversial legislation. However, the Government was required to fully debate legislation, to hold unwanted inquiries and to table documents on request. All this prevented the government from controlling the agenda of day to day politics.

Not that Labor went into the 1995 election certain of victory, Labor was tainted by the growing unpopularity of the Keating Government in Canberra. The opening of the third runway at Sydney Airport in late 1994 created confusion for the Labor Party as the issue threatened the Party's hold on several inner-city seats.

To place a distance with his federal colleagues Carr branded his team as "State Labor" throughout the campaign.

Two referendums were held in conjunction with the election, both of which were approved by the voters. The first concerned the independence of judges. The second, and far more important historically, was the approval of fixed four-year terms to prevent early elections, passed with 76% voting 'yes'.

== Key dates ==
Date	Event
3 March 1995	The Legislative Assembly was dissolved, and writs were issued by the Governor to proceed with an election.
6 March 1995	Nominations for candidates for the election closed at noon.
25 March 1995	Polling day, between the hours of 8am and 6pm.
4 April 1995	The Fahey-Armstrong Ministry resigned and the Carr Ministry was sworn in.
28 April 1995	The writ was returned and the results formally declared.
2 May 1995	Parliament resumed for business.

== Results ==
=== Legislative Assembly ===
Party	Votes	%	+/–	Seats	+/–
Labor	1,408,616	41.26	▲2.21	50	▲4
Liberal	1,121,190	32.84	▼1.65	29	▼2
National	378,878	11.10	▲0.58	17	Steady
Independents	160,169	4.69	▼3.61	3	▼1
Democrats	97,166	2.85	▼2.51	0	Steady
Greens	87,862	2.57	▲1.31	0	Steady
Call to Australia	49,317	1.44	▲0.25	0	Steady
Others	110,564	3.24	▲2.35	0	Steady
Total	3,413,762	100.00	–	99	–
Valid votes	3,413,762	94.85			
Invalid/blank votes	185,379	5.15	▼4.17		
Total votes	3,599,141	100.00	–		
Registered voters/turnout	3,837,102	93.80	▲0.18		
Source: NSW Parliament
Two-party-preferred
Labor	1,594,783	48.82	▲1.51		
Liberal/National Coalition	1,671,866	51.18	▼1.51		
Total	3,266,649	100.00	–		

Popular vote
Labor	41.26%
Liberal	32.84%
National	11.10%
Independents	4.69%
Democrats	2.85%
Greens	2.57%
Call to Australia	1.44%
Others	3.24%
Two-party-preferred vote
Coalition	51.18%
Labor	48.82%
Parliamentary seats
Labor	50
Liberal	29
National	17
Independents	3

Labor easily won Blue Mountains (Liberal chances were ruined when the former Liberal member, Barry Morris, ran as an independent), and narrowly won Badgery's Creek by 107 votes and Gladesville by 260 votes, giving Labor a one-seat majority. The Liberal Party gained South Coast on the retirement of Independent John Hatton, but was unable to dislodge either Peter Macdonald in Manly or Clover Moore in Bligh. Tony Windsor was re-elected without opposition from the National Party in Tamworth.

Despite winning only 48.8% of the two-party-preferred vote for the Legislative Assembly, Labor won a majority of seats. There was speculation that the introduction of one-vote one-value boundaries had disadvantaged the Coalition by locking up too many votes in its safe seats. The discrepancy since 1981 between the state-wide vote and the swing required in marginal seats certainly supported that view. An alternative argument was that the Labor Party had proved itself superior at choosing local candidates and running strong local campaigns. Whatever the cause, the Coalition’s dogged marginal seat campaign in 1995 had come perilously close to denying Labor victory. The irony was that had the Coalition run such a campaign in 1991, the Greiner Government would probably have been re-elected with a narrow majority, and the political turmoil of the previous four years would have been avoided.

The Liberal Party seemed set to challenge the results in seats narrowly won by the ALP in the Court of Disputed Returns, but that idea was dropped on the instructions of the new Liberal leader Peter Collins.

=== Legislative Council ===
Single transferable voting used to elect the 21 members up for election this year. This was an unusually large number of members to be elected through STV.

Party	Votes	%	+/–	Seats			
Party	Votes	%	+/–	Seats Won	Not Up	Total Seats	Seat Change
Liberal/National Coalition	1,300,743	38.63	▼6.85	8	10	18	▼2
Labor	1,191,177	35.38	▼2.04	8	9	17	▼1
Greens	126,591	3.76	▲0.43	1	0	1	▼1
Democrats	108,312	3.22	▼3.49	1	1	2	Steady
Call to Australia	101,556	3.02	▼0.57	1	1	2	Steady
Shooters	95,943	2.85	New	1	0	1	New
Independents Coalition	57,573	1.71	New	0	0	0	New
Against Further Immigration	55,864	1.66	New	0	0	0	New
No Aircraft Noise	45,105	1.34	New	0	0	0	New
ABFFOC	43,225	1.28	New	1	0	1	New
Daylight Saving Extension	43,164	1.28	New	0	0	0	New
Smokers Rights	32,470	0.96	New	0	0	0	New
The Seniors	27,914	0.83	New	0	0	0	New
Others	137,530	4.08	–	0	0	0	Steady
Total	3,367,167	100.00	–	21	21	42	–
Valid votes	3,367,167	93.87					
Invalid/blank votes	219,960	6.13	▼0.31				
Total votes	3,587,127	100.00	–				
Registered voters/turnout	3,837,102	93.49	▲0.22				
Source: ABC

== Seats changing hands ==
Seat	Pre-1995			Swing	Post-1995		
Seat	Party	Member	Margin	Swing	Margin	Member	Party
Badgerys Creek	Liberal	Anne Cohen	2.5	-2.6	0.1	Diane Beamer	Labor
Blue Mountains	Independent*	Barry Morris	2.7	-5.2	2.5	Bob Debus	Labor
Gladesville	Liberal	Ivan Petch	2.9	-3.3	0.4	John Watkins	Labor
South Coast	Independent	John Hatton	18.3	-22.9	4.6	Eric Ellis	Liberal

- Members listed in italics did not recontest their seats.
- The member for Blue Mountains, Barry Morris was elected as a Liberal at the 1991 election, but resigned from the party. He recontested this seat as an independent. The pre-election margin is the Liberal vs. Labor vote.
- In addition, the Labor Party held the district of The Entrance, which it had won from the Liberals at the 1992 by-election.

== Post-election pendulum ==
Labor seats (50)
Marginal
Badgerys Creek	Diane Beamer	ALP	0.1%
Gladesville	John Watkins	ALP	0.4%
Bathurst	Mick Clough	ALP	1.0%
Kogarah	Brian Langton	ALP	1.5%
Drummoyne	John Murray	ALP	2.2%
Blue Mountains	Bob Debus	ALP	2.5%
Penrith	Faye Lo Po'	ALP	2.8%
The Entrance	Grant McBride	ALP	4.1%
Broken Hill	Bill Beckroge	ALP	4.7%
Fairly safe
Coogee	Ernie Page	ALP	6.1%
Peats	Marie Andrews	ALP	8.4%
Wyong	Paul Crittenden	ALP	8.7%
Port Stephens	Bob Martin	ALP	9.0%
Parramatta	Gabrielle Harrison	ALP	9.2%
Hurstville	Morris Iemma	ALP	9.6%
Safe
Swansea	Jill Hall	ALP	10.5%
Marrickville	Andrew Refshauge	ALP	10.5% v NAN
Blacktown	Pam Allan	ALP	10.6%
Riverstone	John Aquilina	ALP	10.6%
East Hills	Pat Rogan	ALP	10.7%
Rockdale	George Thompson	ALP	11.2%
Bulli	Ian McManus	ALP	11.3%
Canterbury	Kevin Moss	ALP	11.7%
Campbelltown	Michael Knight	ALP	11.8%
Kiama	Bob Harrison	ALP	12.2%
Wallsend	John Mills	ALP	12.5%
Moorebank	Craig Knowles	ALP	12.8%
Cessnock	Stan Neilly	ALP	13.1%
Port Jackson	Sandra Nori	ALP	13.6% v NAN
Smithfield	Carl Scully	ALP	13.7%
Maroubra	Bob Carr	ALP	13.8%
Keira	Col Markham	ALP	13.9%
Charlestown	Richard Face	ALP	14.2%
Granville	Kim Yeadon	ALP	14.5%
Lake Macquarie	Jeff Hunter	ALP	14.8%
Ashfield	Paul Whelan	ALP	15.2%
Londonderry	Paul Gibson	ALP	15.3%
Newcastle	Bryce Gaudry	ALP	16.1%
Bankstown	Doug Shedden	ALP	16.2%
Mount Druitt	Richard Amery	ALP	16.7%
Fairfield	Joe Tripodi	ALP	17.1%
Auburn	Peter Nagle	ALP	17.4%
Lakemba	Tony Stewart	ALP	18.7%
Heffron	Deirdre Grusovin	ALP	18.8%
St Marys	Jim Anderson	ALP	18.9%
Liverpool	Paul Lynch	ALP	19.1%
Wollongong	Gerry Sullivan	ALP	20.1%
Illawarra	Terry Rumble	ALP	20.5%
Cabramatta	Reba Meagher	ALP	21.2%
Waratah	John Price	ALP	24.1%

Liberal/National seats (46)
Marginal
Murwillumbah	Don Beck	NAT	2.1%
Camden	Liz Kernohan	LIB	2.6%
Maitland	Peter Blackmore	LIB	4.1%
South Coast	Eric Ellis	LIB	4.6%
Gosford	Chris Hartcher	LIB	5.5%
Fairly safe
Strathfield	Paul Zammit	LIB	6.0%
Sutherland	Chris Downy	LIB	6.4%
Miranda	Ron Phillips	LIB	6.7%
Ermington	Michael Photios	LIB	7.8%
Georges River	Marie Ficarra	LIB	8.0%
Clarence	Ian Causley	NAT	8.3%
Coffs Harbour	Andrew Fraser	NAT	8.7%
Cronulla	Malcolm Kerr	LIB	9.8%
Burrinjuck	Alby Schultz	LIB	9.9%
Safe
Murrumbidgee	Adrian Cruickshank	NAT	10.2%
Southern Highlands	John Fahey	LIB	10.4%
Wagga Wagga	Joe Schipp	LIB	10.7%
Port Macquarie	Wendy Machin	NAT	11.7%
Wakehurst	Brad Hazzard	LIB	12.9%
Northern Tablelands	Ray Chappell	NAT	13.7%
Lismore	Bill Rixon	NAT	13.7%
Bega	Russell Smith	LIB	13.7%
Eastwood	Andrew Tink	LIB	14.2%
Oxley	Bruce Jeffery	NAT	14.8%
Vaucluse	Peter Debnam	LIB	15.4%
Monaro	Peter Cochran	NAT	16.2%
Albury	Ian Glachan	LIB	16.3%
Orange	Gary West	NAT	16.4%
Ballina	Don Page	NAT	17.4%
Baulkham Hills	Wayne Merton	LIB	17.5%
Dubbo	Gerry Peacocke	NAT	18.0%
Myall Lakes	John Turner	NAT	18.4%
Hawkesbury	Kevin Rozzoli	LIB	18.5%
Northcott	Barry O'Farrell	LIB	18.6%
Upper Hunter	George Souris	NAT	19.0%
Ku-ring-gai	Stephen O'Doherty	LIB	19.0%
North Shore	Jillian Skinner	LIB	19.2%
Willoughby	Peter Collins	LIB	20.0%
Barwon	Ian Slack-Smith	NAT	20.1%
Lane Cove	Kerry Chikarovski	LIB	20.2%
Pittwater	Jim Longley	LIB	20.8%
Lachlan	Ian Armstrong	NAT	22.4%
Davidson	Andrew Humpherson	LIB	22.8%
The Hills	Michael Richardson	LIB	25.3%
Murray	Jim Small	NAT	27.6%
Gordon	Jeremy Kinross	LIB	30.3%
Crossbench seats (3)
Manly	Peter Macdonald	IND	0.4% v LIB
Bligh	Clover Moore	IND	5.5% v LIB
Tamworth	Tony Windsor	IND	34.8% v ALP

== See also ==
- Candidates of the 1995 New South Wales state election
