= 1997 Sutherland state by-election =

Election result for Sutherland, New South Wales, Australia

The 1997 Sutherland state by-election was held on 20 December 1997 for the New South Wales Legislative Assembly electorate of Sutherland following the retirement of the sitting member, Liberal MP Chris Downy.

== Result ==
1997 Sutherland by-election Saturday 20 December
Party	Candidate	Votes	%	±%
Liberal	Lorna Stone	16,687	45.46	−5.39
Labor	Christine Hawkins	12,674	34.53	−2.83
Christian Democrats	David Copeland	1,804	4.91	+0.93
Greens	Jo-Anne Lentern	1,710	4.66	
AAFI	Janey Woodger	1,567	4.27	
Outdoor Recreation	Glenn Druery	780	2.13	
Independent	David Hunt	557	1.52	
Independent	Geoff Moore	530	1.44	
Independent	David Harris	396	1.08	
Total formal votes		36,705	98.12	+1.70
Informal votes		702	1.88	−1.70
Turnout		37,407	84.59	−11.45
Two-party-preferred result
Liberal	Lorna Stone	18,950	56.23	−0.21
Labor	Christine Hawkins	14,752	43.77	+0.21
Liberal hold		Swing	−0.21	

== See also ==
- Electoral results for the district of Sutherland
- List of New South Wales state by-elections
