= No Aircraft Noise =

Minor political party in Sydney, Australia

No Aircraft Noise The Common Cause – No Aircraft Noise
- Abbreviation: NAN
- Founded: 1994; 31 years ago
- Registered: 24 July 1995; 30 years ago
- Dissolved: 13 August 1999; 26 years ago
- Ideology: Single-issue; Anti-noise pollution
- Slogan: "The Common Cause"
- Hunter's Hill Council: 3 / 7
- Marrickville Council: 3 / 12
- Leichhardt Council: 2 / 12

No Aircraft Noise (NAN), sometimes referred to as the No Aircraft Noise Party and officially registered as The Common Cause – No Aircraft Noise, was an Australian political party. It sought to remove noise pollution for residents of Sydney that was created by the city's three airports, suggesting that the airports should instead be moved to outer suburbs away from dense residential areas.

The party's most notable results were a primary vote of 23.65% and two-candidate-preferred vote of 39.55% in the electorate of Marrickville at the 1995 state election, as well as 13.61% in the inner-Sydney electorate of Grayndler ay the 1996 federal election.

At the 1995 local government elections, No Aircraft Noise gained representation in every local government area it contested − two seats in Leichhardt, three in Hunter's Hill and three in Marrickville.

The party's members included Sylvia Hale, who was a member of No Aircraft Noise from its formation in 1994 until it dissolved in 1999. She represented the party as a councillor in Marrickville, later joining the Greens in 2000 and serving a member of the New South Wales Legislative Council from 2003 until 2010.
