= Terry Griffiths (politician) =

Australian politician (1944–2009)

The Honourable Terry Griffiths

Member of the New South Wales Parliament for Georges River
- In office 22 February 1988 – 3 March 1995
- Preceded by: Frank Walker
- Succeeded by: Marie Ficarra

Personal details
- Born: 22 June 1944 Sydney
- Died: 18 June 2009 (aged 64)
- Party: Liberal Party (1988–1994); Independent (1994–1995)
- Spouse(s): Jann Mariette Hart m. 1965, diss. Diane von Westernhagen m. 1974, diss. 2000
- Children: 1 (f), 1 (s) with Hart; 1 (f), 2 (s) with von Westernhagen
- Occupation: Politician

Military service
- Allegiance: Australia
- Branch/service: Australian Army
- Years of service: 1962–1982
- Rank: Major

Terence Allan Griffiths (22 June 1944 – 18 June 2009) was a New South Wales (NSW) state politician from 1988 to 1995, and NSW government minister from 1991 to 1994, whose political career ended in disgrace over sexual harassment, molestation and bullying claims.

== Political career ==
Griffiths joined the Liberal Party of Australia in 1987. In 1988, he was elected as the member for the southern Sydney seat of Georges River in the NSW Legislative Assembly, defeating sitting Labor MP Frank Walker. Following an electorate boundary redistribution, he was re-elected easily in 1991 and became Minister for Justice then, in 1992, Minister for Police and Minister for Emergency Services. In 1994, Griffiths was forced to resign from both the government ministry and the Liberal Party over claims of sexual harassment. He continued as an independent member of the NSW Legislative Assembly but did not stand for re-election at the 1995 election.

== Background and personal life ==
Griffiths was born in Marrickville, NSW; his father was Richard Patrick Griffiths, an army officer of the Cadet School Portsea. He was educated at Liverpool Boys High School. In 1962 he was trained at the Officer Cadet School, Portsea and the School of Military Engineering and was commissioned as an army officer. In 1965 he married Jann Mariette Hart, with whom he had two children. He served in South Vietnam 1969–70. He and Jann divorced and, on 19 January 1974, he married Diane Maree von Westernhagen with whom he had three children. Griffiths was an army attaché in Washington 1978–81. After reaching the rank of Major, he left the army in 1982. From 1983 to 1988 he was employed as the chief executive officer of The Scout Association of Australia's NSW branch. During his time as chief executive officer of The Scout Association of Australia NSW branch, serial sexual abuse by Scout Association of Australia NSW branch officers took place, including by commissioner and NSW branch council officer, Darryl Rubiolo. He repeatedly backed and protected Rubiolo who lived in and was the Scout Association of Australia commissioner for his electorate. Following the failure of his political career on claims of sexual harassment, molestation and bullying of staff, he was removed from The Scout Association of Australia NSW branch council and his second wife divorced him in 2000.

Military honours and awards

Australian Active Service Medal 1945–1975	
Vietnam Medal	
Defence Force Service Medal with 1 Rosette	for 20–24 years of service
National Medal	for 15–24 years of service
Australian Defence Medal	2006

New South Wales Legislative Assembly
Preceded by Frank Walker	Member for Georges River; 1988–1995	Succeeded by Marie Ficarra
