= Col Markham =

Australian politician (1940–2020)

Member of the New South Wales Legislative Assembly for Keira
- In office 19 March 1988 – 5 March 1999
- Preceded by: New district
- Succeeded by: David Campbell

Member of the New South Wales Legislative Assembly for Wollongong
- In office 27 March 1999 – 28 February 2003
- Preceded by: Gerry Sullivan
- Succeeded by: Noreen Hay

Parliamentary Secretary for Aboriginal Affairs
- In office 6 April 1995 – 28 February 2003

Personal details
- Born: Colin William Markham; 4 June 1940 Wollongong, New South Wales
- Died: 6 September 2020 (aged 80) Wollongong, New South Wales
- Party: Labor Party
- Spouse: Melissa Ford
- Children: 3 sons
- Occupation: Electrical fitter

Colin William Markham (4 June 1940 – 6 September 2020) was an Australian politician. He was a Labor Party member of the New South Wales Legislative Assembly from 1988 to 2003, representing the electorates of Keira (1988–1999) and Wollongong (1999–2003). He was a parliamentary secretary in the first two terms of the Carr Labor government.

== Early years ==
Markham was born in Wollongong, the son of Vincent Markham and his wife Iris, and studied at West Wollongong Public School and Wollongong Junior Technical College (now Keira High School). He dropped out of school at fifteen and took up an apprenticeship as an electrical fitter with the Electricity Commission of New South Wales. He worked in the Kemira mines for two years after the completion of his apprenticeship, before shifting to the Coalcliff mines, where he spent a further 24 years. He joined the Labor Party in response to the Australian constitutional crisis of 1975 and was active in his local branches for many years thereafter.

== State politics ==
Markham won Labor preselection for the newly created seat of Keira in 1988, following the abolition of the previously safe Labor seat of Corrimal held by the long-serving Member for Corrimal, Laurie Kelly. Kelly challenged sitting Independent MP Frank Arkell for his seat in Wollongong but was defeated.

Markham won a narrow victory and was subsequently reelected at the 1991 and 1995 State elections, increasing his majority at each election. Markham developed a reputation as an occasionally outspoken local MP, publicly clashing with his party over their policies on the coal industry not long after his election. He was promoted into the shadow ministry in 1989, taking the position of Shadow Minister for Aboriginal Affairs, but was cut upon the election of the Carr government in 1995 after struggling to gain a profile in the role.

Markham was appointed Parliamentary Secretary for Aboriginal Affairs after his demotion from Cabinet and was a persistent advocate for Aboriginal issues throughout the remainder of his parliamentary career. He was the architect of early land rights legislation transferring a number of government-owned sites into the control of their traditional owners, and continually campaigned for action from the state government on Aboriginal reconciliation, ultimately resulting in the Carr government's Statement of Commitment on Aboriginal reconciliation in 1997. He was also a frequent advocate for local workers as the job cuts of the 1990s hit the Wollongong economy hard.

Markham had long faced rumours of a preselection challenge from the right faction, which had been gaining increasing dominance in his region through the late 1990s. As a popular local member, however, he was tipped to be difficult to shift and planned challenges for the 1991 and 1995 elections never eventuated. He faced a much more difficult situation ahead of the 1999 election, however, when an electoral redistribution saw the right-wing faction gain firm control of the electorate's Labor branches. A deal was struck by which Markham would instead contest preselection for the neighbouring seat of Wollongong, held by fellow left-winger Gerry Sullivan. Markham won preselection for Wollongong, but his treatment by the party caused a local backlash, with Wollongong councillor Dave Martin running for and nearly winning Markham's old seat of Keira as an independent. Sullivan took the preselection to the Supreme Court but lost, and publicly considered running as an independent before deciding against it.

He was reappointed as Parliamentary Secretary for Aboriginal Affairs after the election, and acted as a strong proponent of Sorry Day and National Reconciliation Week. He faced speculation about another challenge for his seat in 2002, when it was leaked to the press that his name was on an internal party "hit list" for the next election. Long a target of the right-wing, the faction had been especially angered by his refusal to cross a union picket line at Parliament House in opposition to Carr government workers' compensation changes that were deeply unpopular in Markham's blue-collar electorate. The speculation received a sharp response from the trade union movement, with the local divisions of six major unions threatening protests and support for independent candidacies if Markham was toppled by head office. Markham's impending axing took on federal consequences when angry local unions and left-wing groups directed their resources against the right faction candidate Labor had endorsed for a by-election in the federal seat of Cunningham; in a shock result, Green candidate Michael Organ won the seat after a disastrous Labor campaign.

Markham received a late endorsement from Premier Bob Carr ahead of the 2002 preselection vote, but this was not enough to sway the right-dominated preselectors, who voted for Noreen Hay, a local left faction figure who defected to the right soon after. He retired at the election rather than run as an independent, and Hay held the seat, albeit with a 13% swing against her. Tickets to his farewell dinner at the WIN Entertainment Centre sold out five days before it was held.

== Community involvement ==
After leaving politics, Markham maintained his interest in Aboriginal affairs, serving as an Executive Member, deputy chairperson, and Ambassador of the New South Wales Reconciliation Council. He held a strong interest in rugby league and was a Director of the Illawarra Steelers Board and Gold Foundation Member of the Illawarra Steelers as well as Chairman of the Illawarra Steelers' Injured Player Fund.

In 2003, he was awarded as an Honorary Fellow of the University of Wollongong.

New South Wales Legislative Assembly
New district	Member for Keira; 1988–1999	Succeeded by David Campbell
Preceded by Gerry Sullivan	Member for Wollongong; 1999–2003	Succeeded by Noreen Hay
