= Electoral district of Moorebank =

Former state electoral district of New South Wales, Australia

Moorebank was an electoral district of the Legislative Assembly in the Australian State of New South Wales from 1991, replacing Macquarie Fields and named after the suburb of Moorebank. In 1999, it was replaced by Macquarie Fields. Its only member was Craig Knowles, representing the Labor Party.

== Members for Moorebank ==
| Member | Party | Term |
|---|---|---|
| Craig Knowles | Labor | 1991–1999 |

== Election results ==
=== 1995 ===
1995 New South Wales state election: Moorebank
| Party | Candidate | Votes | % | ±% |
|---|---|---|---|---|
| Labor | Craig Knowles | 20,004 | 54.2 | +9.0 |
| Liberal | Tony Pascale | 11,267 | 30.5 | −2.5 |
| Against Further Immigration | John Woodbridge | 2,681 | 7.3 | +7.3 |
| Independent | Terry Seacy | 1,148 | 3.1 | +3.1 |
| Call to Australia | Michelle Jones | 977 | 2.6 | +1.0 |
| Independent | Michael Allen | 851 | 2.3 | +2.3 |
| Total formal votes | | 36,928 | 94.6 | +6.3 |
| Informal votes | | 2,112 | 5.4 | −6.3 |
| Turnout | | 39,040 | 93.7 | |
Two-party-preferred result
| Labor | Craig Knowles | 21,796 | 62.8 | +8.4 |
| Liberal | Tony Pascale | 12,895 | 37.2 | −8.4 |
| Labor hold | | Swing | +8.4 | |

=== 1991 ===
1991 New South Wales state election: Moorebank
| Party | Candidate | Votes | % | ±% |
|---|---|---|---|---|
| Labor | Craig Knowles | 13,833 | 45.1 | −0.8 |
| Liberal | Tony Pascale | 10,129 | 33.1 | −4.9 |
| Independent | Jim Kremmer | 3,267 | 10.7 | +10.7 |
| Independent | Lillian Beckett | 1,525 | 5.0 | +5.0 |
| Democrats | Julian Connelly | 874 | 2.9 | −0.3 |
| Call to Australia | Lindsay Amor | 514 | 1.7 | +1.7 |
| Independent | Bryce Regan | 505 | 1.6 | +1.6 |
| Total formal votes | | 30,647 | 88.3 | −7.5 |
| Informal votes | | 4,071 | 11.7 | +7.5 |
| Turnout | | 34,718 | 94.0 | |
Two-party-preferred result
| Labor | Craig Knowles | 15,174 | 54.4 | +0.7 |
| Liberal | Tony Pascale | 12,724 | 45.6 | −0.7 |
| Labor hold | | Swing | +0.7 | |
