= Lorna Stone =

Australian politician

Lorna June Stone AM (born 25 June 1938) is a former Australian politician. She was the Liberal Party member of the New South Wales Legislative Assembly for Sutherland from 1997 to 1999.

Stone was born Lorna Nicholson to parents Alfred and Erla. She was a drama teacher, having received her teacher's certificate from Sydney Teachers College before also attending Trinity College London. In 1974, she joined the Sylvania branch of the Liberal Party, and remained active in the party thereafter, holding various positions including campaign secretary and chairman of the local government executive. She married Keith Stone, with whom she had four children. She was also a Sutherland Shire Councillor from 1991 to 1995.

In 1997, the Liberal member for the state seat of Sutherland, Chris Downy, resigned, forcing a by-election for the seat. Stone was selected as the Liberal candidate. Labor had defeated the Liberal government two years earlier and had hopes of winning the seat, but Stone emerged with an increased majority over Labor candidate Christine Hawkins. However, the seat was abolished for the 1999 state election, and Stone contested the new seat of Heathcote. The new seat had a notional Labor margin and was also contested by Ian McManus, the Labor member for the abolished seat of Bulli, who convincingly defeated Stone. She retired from politics following her defeat.

Stone was appointed a Member of the Order of Australia in the 2014 Queen's Birthday Honours in recognition of her "significant service to community health through roles with a range of organisations".

New South Wales Legislative Assembly
Preceded by Chris Downy	Member for Sutherland; 1997–1999	Succeeded by Abolished
