= Marie Ficarra =

Australian politician

The Honourable Marie Ficarra OAM

Member of the New South Wales Legislative Council
- In office 24 March 2007 – 6 March 2015

Member of the New South Wales Legislative Assembly for Georges River
- In office 25 March 1995 – 5 March 1999
- Preceded by: Terry Griffiths
- Succeeded by: Kevin Greene

Personal details
- Born: 25 March 1954 (age 72) Sydney, Australia
- Party: Liberal Party (1995–1999, 2007–2014); Independent (2014–2015)
- Spouse: Alan Carless
- Education: University of Sydney
- Website: www.marieficarramlc.com.au

Marie Ann Ficarra OAM (born 25 March 1954) is an Australian politician who was a Liberal Party member of the New South Wales Legislative Council from 2007 to 2015. She was previously a member of the New South Wales Legislative Assembly for Georges River, but was defeated during the landslide election of 1999. She was the Shadow Minister for the Environment for the New South Wales Opposition.

== Representative history ==
Ms Ficarra was elected to Hurstville City Council in 1980 to become one of few young women in local government at the time. She was later the Deputy Mayor and then Mayor of Hurstville City and served in these roles for 16 years until 1995. During this time she was elected president and later life member of the Australian Local Government Women's Association.

She was elected to the New South Wales Legislative Assembly in 1995 and was appointed Shadow Minister for the Environment in 1998. In 2007 she became the first woman in the history of the New South Wales Parliament to have served in the Legislative Assembly and then be elected to the Legislative Council. In 2011 upon the election of Barry O'Farrell as Premier Ms Ficarra was appointed Parliamentary Secretary to the Premier.

On 28 April 2014, Ms Ficarra stood aside as Parliamentary Secretary to the Premier following implication in a hearing of the Independent Commission Against Corruption that she had solicited a donation to the Liberal Party from a prohibited donor. She denied the allegations.

Ms Ficarra was later cleared of any wrongdoing and ICAC made no adverse findings and made no recommendations against her. Ms Ficarra maintained that her evidence in this matter was truthful, complete and uniquely compatible with objective evidence available to ICAC, including the content of text messages she sent and received that day.

Ms Ficarra in the 2020 Australia Day Honours List was awarded the Medal of the Order of Australia (OAM) in recognition of her outstanding service to the people and Parliament of New South Wales.

Official parliamentary roles:
| Position | Start | End |
|---|---|---|
| Member, Health Care Complaints Commission Committee | 1995 | 1999 |
| Member of the NSW Legislative Assembly | 25 March 1995 | 5 March 1999 |
| Member of the NSW Legislative Council | 24 March 2007 | 6 March 2015 |
| Member for Georges River | 25 March 1995 | 5 March 1999 |
| Member, Standing Committee on Privacy | 1 December 1996 | 1 December 1998 |
| Parliamentary Information Technology Committee | 1 December 1996 | 1 December 1998 |
| Member, General Purpose Standing Committee No. 2 | 29 May 2007 | 14 May 2014 |
| Member, Standing Committee on Social Issues | 29 May 2007 | 4 March 2011 |
| Shadow Minister for Environment | 1 January 1998 | 1 January 1999 |

== Professional career ==
Ficarra worked in her early career as a scientist investigating children's muscular dystrophy. She became state manager for Hoechst Australia's Behring Diagnostics and later general manager of Cytyc Australia for Australia and New Zealand for many years. Cytyc introduced into Australia new cervical cancer screening technology and other diagnostics applications related to sexual health.

== Education ==
Ficarra has a BSc (Hons) from the University of Sydney. Following graduation she became a senior tutor at the university in histology and physiology, teaching medical, dental, veterinary science and science students.

As government affairs adviser to Merck Sharp and Dohme Australia, she assisted in obtaining federal government approval and reimbursement for many vital pharmaceuticals including the cervical cancer vaccine. During that time she was elected for three years to the executive of the NSW Liberal Party of which she has been a member for over 30 years.

New South Wales Legislative Assembly
| Preceded by Terry Griffiths | Member for Georges River; 1995–1999 | Succeeded by Kevin Greene |
