= Gerry Sullivan (politician) =

Australian politician

Gerald James Sullivan (20 July 1943 – 1 September 2000) was an Australian politician. He was the Labor member for Wollongong in the New South Wales Legislative Assembly from 1991 to 1999.

Sullivan was born in Binnaway to parents Leicester and Nina. He was educated at Binnaway and Coonabarabran before attending the University of Wollongong, where he received a Bachelor of Commerce and a Graduate Diploma of Accountancy. He also attended Sydney Teachers College, and taught in the state system from 1964 to 1991. He joined the Coogee branch of the Labor Party in 1961. On 12 January 1968 he married Rhonda Lock, with whom he had three children.

In 1991, Sullivan was selected as the Labor candidate for the state seat of Wollongong, at that time held by independent MP Frank Arkell. Sullivan won convincingly, and was easily re-elected in 1995. The 1999 redistribution saw a complex factional deal give the seat to Keira MP Col Markham, and Sullivan did not contest the seat. He died at Wollongong in 2000.

New South Wales Legislative Assembly
Preceded by Frank Arkell	Member for Wollongong; 1991–1999	Succeeded by Col Markham
