= Electoral district of Ermington =

Former state electoral district of New South Wales, Australia

Ermington was an electoral district for the Legislative Assembly in the Australian State of New South Wales from 1991 to 1999, named after the suburb of Ermington. Its only member was Michael Photios, representing the Liberal Party.

== Members for Ermington ==
Member	Party	Term
Michael Photios	Liberal	1991–1999

== Election results ==
1995 New South Wales state election: Ermington
Party	Candidate	Votes	%	±%
Liberal	Michael Photios	16,762	50.9	−5.0
Labor	Richard Talbot	11,864	36.1	+0.7
Against Further Immigration	John Hutchinson	2,312	7.0	+7.0
Democrats	Betty Endean	1,963	6.0	−2.7
Total formal votes		32,901	95.2	+4.0
Informal votes		1,662	4.8	−4.0
Turnout		34,563	93.7	
Two-party-preferred result
Liberal	Michael Photios	18,199	57.8	−1.8
Labor	Richard Talbot	13,271	42.2	+1.8
Liberal hold		Swing	−1.8	
