= Chris Downy =

Australian politician (born 1955)

Chris Downy MP

Member of the New South Wales Parliament for Sutherland
- In office 19 March 1988 – 2 December 1997
- Preceded by: New seat
- Succeeded by: Lorna Stone

Personal details
- Born: March 29, 1955 (age 71) New South Wales, Australia
- Party: Liberal Party of Australia
- Spouse: Joanne
- Children: 4

Christopher John Downy (born 29 March 1955) is a former Australian politician. He was the Liberal Party member for Sutherland in the New South Wales Legislative Assembly from 1988 to 1997, and Minister for Sport, Recreation and Racing from 1993 to 1995.

== Biography ==
Downy was born on 29 March 1955, the eldest son of Gerald and Marie Downy. He was educated at Saint Patrick’s Christian Brothers College Sutherland. He attended the University of Sydney, where he received his Bachelor of Arts (Hons), and Sydney Teachers College, where he received a Diploma of Education. He was subsequently a secondary school teacher. He joined the Liberal Party in 1974 and was active in local politics.

In 1980, Downy was the Liberal candidate for the safe federal Labor seat of Hughes; he was unsuccessful. Downy was elected to Sutherland Shire Council in 1983, and in 1988 was selected as the Liberal candidate for the state seat of Sutherland. The seat replaced the abolished Woronora, and was contested by that seat's Labor member Maurie Keane, but Downy narrowly defeated him to win the seat.

Downy was appointed Minister for Sport, Recreation and Racing in 1993, but lost that position when Labor won office in 1995. He resigned his seat in 1997, prompting a by-election that was won by Liberal candidate Lorna Stone.

In 2012, Downy was elected state president of the NSW Liberal Party, succeeding Arthur Sinodinos.

New South Wales Legislative Assembly
Preceded by New seat	Member for Sutherland; 1988–1997	Succeeded by Lorna Stone
