= Electoral district of Sutherland =

Former state electoral district of New South Wales, Australia

Sutherland was an electoral district of the Legislative Assembly in the Australian state of New South Wales from 1950 to 1971 before it was abolished. The seat was reformed in 1988 until 1999. The seat was based on the suburb of Sutherland in the southern districts of Sydney.

The seat was abolished for the 1999 state election, and Lorna Stone, the sitting member contested the new seat of Heathcote. The new seat had a notional Labor margin and was also contested by Ian McManus, the Labor member for the abolished seat of Bulli. McManus convincingly defeated Stone.

== Members for Sutherland ==
First incarnation (1950–1971)
Member	Party	Term
Cecil Monro	Liberal	1950–1953
Tom Dalton	Labor	1953–1956
Ian Griffith	Liberal	1956–1959
Tom Dalton	Labor	1959–1968
Tim Walker	Liberal	1968–1971
Second incarnation (1988–1999)
Member	Party	Term
Chris Downy	Liberal	1988–1997
Lorna Stone	Liberal	1997–1999

== Election results ==
1997 Sutherland by-election Saturday 20 December
Party	Candidate	Votes	%	±%
Liberal	Lorna Stone	16,687	45.46	−5.39
Labor	Christine Hawkins	12,674	34.53	−2.83
Christian Democrats	David Copeland	1,804	4.91	+0.93
Greens	Jo-Anne Lentern	1,710	4.66	
Against Further Immigration	Janey Woodger	1,567	4.27	
Outdoor Recreation	Glenn Druery	780	2.13	
Independent	David Hunt	557	1.52	
Independent	Geoff Moore	530	1.44	
Independent	David Harris	396	1.08	
Total formal votes		36,705	98.12	+1.70
Informal votes		702	1.88	−1.70
Turnout		37,407	84.59	−11.45
Two-party-preferred result
Liberal	Lorna Stone	18,950	56.23	−0.21
Labor	Christine Hawkins	14,752	43.77	+0.21
Liberal hold		Swing	−0.21	

Chris Downy (Liberal) resigned.
