= Michael Photios =

Australian politician (born 1960)

Michael Stephen Photios (born 26 September 1960) is an Australian former politician who was the Minister for Multicultural and Ethnic Affairs and Minister Assisting the Minister for Justice from 1993 to 1995 in the New South Wales Government.

== Parliamentarian ==
Photios was the member representing the constituencies of Ryde (1988–91) and Ermington (1991–99) in the New South Wales Parliament for the New South Wales Division of the Liberal Party.

== Liberal Party ==
Photios joined the New South Wales Division of the Liberal Party in November 1975, holding many party executive roles including New South Wales Young Liberal Vice President from 1980 to 1981 and then President from 1982 to 1984. He held and holds various positions within the Liberal Party, he has held the positions of NSW Vice President and Urban Representative on the Liberal Party State Executive, and is a leader of the Moderate faction of the party known as "The Group".

Photios was Minister for Multicultural and Ethnic Affairs and Minister Assisting the Minister for Justice from 26 May 1993 to 4 Apr 1995 in the Government of John Fahey.

In 1999, Ermington was abolished, and Photios opted to transfer to a recreated Ryde. Although Ryde was a marginally Liberal seat on paper, Photios lost to the former Labor member for Gladesville, John Watkins, amid Labor's convincing victory that year.

In 2011, Photios was identified as a key member of both Liberal leader Barry O'Farrell's kitchen cabinet and inner circle going into government.

== Personal life ==
Photios was born to Henry Basil Photios and Helen Marjorie Photios. He was educated at Beecroft Primary School and The King's School, Parramatta from 1972 to 1978. Photios married Janice Mullcay on 23 April 1994, and had two children. After five years, Michael separated from Janice and married fashion designer Mela Purdie, with whom he has one son. Michael and Mela separated in 2007 and later divorced.

On 21 October 2009, the Daily Telegraph reported that Photios was dating younger woman, Kristina Iantchev. Photios, then 50, was reported as commenting in response that "There is too much mediocrity and boredom in politics...we should all get a life...If I've been known to go to a party or two, I'm happy to go to another. My advice would be for everyone to try it". A year later, Photios announced his engagement to Iantchev and they married on 2 October 2011 in Phuket, Thailand. They have two children together.

New South Wales Legislative Assembly
Preceded by Garry McIlwaine	Member for Ryde; 1988–1991	Succeeded by Abolished
Preceded by New seat	Member for Ermington; 1991–1999	Succeeded by Abolished
