= Members of the New South Wales Legislative Assembly, 1968–1971 =

Members of the New South Wales Legislative Assembly who served in the 42nd parliament held their seats from 1968 to 1971. They were elected at the 1968 state election, and at by-elections. The Speaker was Sir Kevin Ellis.

Name	Party	Electorate	Term in office
Robert Askin	Liberal	Collaroy	1950–1975
Brian Bannon	Labor	Rockdale	1959–1986
John Barraclough	Liberal	Bligh	1968–1981
Jack Beale	Liberal	South Coast	1942–1973
Eric Bedford	Labor	Fairfield	1968–1985
Ken Booth	Labor	Wallsend	1960–1988
Lionel Bowen (Note: Randwick Labor MLA Lionel Bowen resigned on 18 September 1969 in order to contest the federal seat of Kingsford Smith at the 1969 federal election. Labor candidate Laurie Brereton won the resulting by-election on 14 February 1970.)	Labor	Randwick	1962–1969
Laurie Brereton	Labor	Randwick	1970–1971, 1973–1990
Ron Brewer	Country	Goulburn	1965–1984
Jim Brown	Country	Raleigh	1959–1984
Tim Bruxner	Country	Tenterfield	1962–1981
Tom Cahill	Labor	Cook's River	1959–1983
Jim Cameron	Liberal	Northcott	1968–1984
Bill Chaffey	Country	Tamworth	1940–1973
Jim Clough	Liberal	Eastwood	1956–1988
Reg Coady	Labor	Drummoyne	1954–1973
Harold Coates	Independent	Blue Mountains	1965–1976
Peter Coleman	Liberal	Fuller	1968–1978
Bruce Cowan	Country	Oxley	1965–1980
Peter Cox	Labor	Auburn	1965–1988
Bill Crabtree	Labor	Kogarah	1953–1983
Geoff Crawford	Country	Barwon	1950–1976
Douglas Cross (Note: Georges River Country Party MLA Douglas Cross died on 9 July 1970. Labor candidate Frank Walker won the resulting by-election on 19 September.)	Liberal	Georges River	1948–1953, 1956–1970
Charles Cutler	Country	Orange	1947–1975
Douglas Darby	Liberal	Manly	1945–1978
Bernie Deane	Liberal	Hawkesbury	1950–1972
Roger Degen	Labor	Balmain	1968–1984
Keith Doyle	Liberal	Vaucluse	1965–1978
Max Dunbier	Liberal	Campbelltown	1968–1971
Ron Dunbier	Liberal	Nepean	1965–1971
Bruce Duncan	Country	Lismore	1965–1988
Vince Durick	Labor	Lakemba	1964–1984
Clarrie Earl	Labor	Bass Hill	1953–1973
Syd Einfeld	Labor	Bondi	1965–1981
Sir Kevin Ellis	Liberal	Coogee	1948–1953, 1956–1962, 1965–1973
Jack Ferguson	Labor	Merrylands	1959–1984
Wal Fife	Liberal	Wagga Wagga	1957–1975
Col Fisher (Note: Upper Hunter Country Party MLA Frank O'Keefe resigned on 22 September 1969 in order to contest the federal seat of Paterson at the 1969 federal election. Country Party candidate Col Fisher won the resulting by-election on 14 February 1970.)	Country	Upper Hunter	1970–1988
Pat Flaherty	Labor	Granville	1962–1984
George Freudenstein	Country	Young	1959–1981
Lin Gordon (Note: Murrumbidgee Labor MLA Al Grassby resigned on 18 September 1969 in order to contest the federal seat of Riverina at the 1969 federal election. Labor candidate Lin Gordon won the resulting by-election on 14 February 1970.)	Labor	Murrumbidgee	1970–1984
Al Grassby	Labor	Murrumbidgee	1965–1969
Ian Griffith	Liberal	Cronulla	1956–1978
Bill Haigh	Labor	Maroubra	1968–1983
Dick Healey	Liberal	Wakehurst	1962–1981
Jack Hough	Liberal	Wollongong	1965–1971
Pat Hills	Labor	Phillip	1954–1988
Davis Hughes	Country	Armidale	1950–1953, 1956–1973
Ted Humphries	Liberal	Gosford	1965–1971
David Hunter	Liberal	Ashfield	1940–1976
Merv Hunter (Note: Lake Macquarie Labor MLA Jim Simpson died on 10 December 1968. Labor candidate Merv Hunter won the resulting by-election on 19 April 1969.)	Labor	Lake Macquarie	1969–1991
John Jackett	Liberal	Burwood	1965–1978
Rex Jackson	Labor	Bulli	1955–1986
Harry Jago	Liberal	Gordon	1962–1973
Harry Jensen	Labor	Wyong	1965–1981
Lew Johnstone	Labor	Broken Hill	1965–1981
Sam Jones	Labor	Waratah	1965–1984
Nick Kearns	Labor	Bankstown	1962–1980
Laurie Kelly	Labor	Corrimal	1968–1988
Joe Kelly	Labor	East Hills	1956–1973
Joe Lawson	Independent	Murray	1932–1973
Tom Lewis	Liberal	Wollondilly	1957–1978
Gordon Mackie	Liberal	Albury	1965–1978
Dan Mahoney	Labor	Parramatta	1959–1976
John Maddison	Liberal	Hornsby	1962–1980
Jack Mannix	Labor	Liverpool	1952–1971
John Mason	Liberal	Dubbo	1965–1981
Steve Mauger	Liberal	Monaro	1965–1976
Robert McCartney	Labor	Hamilton	1959–1971
Ken McCaw	Liberal	Lane Cove	1947–1975
Laurie McGinty	Liberal	Willoughby	1968–1978
Tom Mead	Liberal	Hurstville	1965–1976
Milton Morris	Liberal	Maitland	1956–1980
Pat Morton	Liberal	Mosman	1947–1972
Lerryn Mutton	Liberal	Yaralla	1968–1978
George Neilly	Labor	Cessnock	1959–1978
Frank O'Keefe	Country	Upper Hunter	1961–1969
Clive Osborne	Country	Bathurst	1967–1981
George Petersen	Labor	Kembla	1968–1988
Leon Punch	Country	Gloucester	1959–1985
Ernie Quinn	Labor	Wentworthville	1962–1988
Jack Renshaw	Labor	Castlereagh	1941–1980
Max Ruddock	Liberal	The Hills	1962–1976
Norm Ryan	Labor	Marrickville	1953–1973
Bill Sheahan	Labor	Burrinjuck	1941–1973
Jim Simpson	Labor	Lake Macquarie	1950–1968
Albert Sloss	Labor	King	1956–1973
Jim Southee	Labor	Blacktown	1962–1973
Stanley Stephens	Country	Byron	1944–1973
Jack Stewart	Labor	Kahibah	1957–1972
Kevin Stewart	Labor	Canterbury	1962–1985
Jim Taylor	Country	Temora	1960–1981
Arthur Wade	Labor	Newcastle	1968–1988
John Waddy	Liberal	Kirribilli	1962–1976
Frank Walker	Labor	Georges River	1970–1988
Tim Walker	Liberal	Sutherland	1968–1978
Bill Weiley	Country	Clarence	1955–1971
Eric Willis	Liberal	Earlwood	1950–1978
Roger Wotton	Country	Burrendong	1968–1971, 1973–1991

== See also ==
- Second Askin ministry
- Third Askin ministry
- Results of the 1968 New South Wales state election
- Candidates of the 1968 New South Wales state election
