= Results of the 1968 New South Wales state election =

State election for New South Wales, Australia in February 1968

New South Wales state election, 24 February 1968 Legislative Assembly << 1965–1971 >>
Enrolled voters	2,356,977				
Votes cast	2,219,979		Turnout	94.19	+0.28
Informal votes	58,409		Informal	2.63	+0.59
Summary of votes by party
Party	Primary votes	%	Swing	Seats	Change
Liberal	831,514	38.47	−1.12	36	+5
Country	229,656	10.62	+0.39	17	+1
Labor	931,563	43.10	−0.21	39	−6
Independent	92,704	4.29	+1.17	2	+1
Democratic Labor	49,457	2.29	+0.18	0	−
New Staters	17,303	0.80	+0.80	0	−
Communist	5,828	0.27	−0.37	0	−
All others	3,545	0.16	+0.16	0	−
Independent Liberal	0	0	−1.00	0	−1
Total	2,161,570			94	

This is a list of electoral district results for the 1968 New South Wales state election.

== Results by Electoral district ==
=== Albury ===
1968 New South Wales state election: Albury
Party	Candidate	Votes	%	±%
Liberal	Gordon Mackie	11,537	58.3	+23.4
Labor	Douglas McFarlane	6,327	32.0	−6.1
Democratic Labor	Anthony Quinn	1,921	9.7	+4.6
Total formal votes		19,785	98.3	−0.5
Informal votes		344	1.7	+0.5
Turnout		20,129	93.3	−0.2
Two-party-preferred result
Liberal	Gordon Mackie	13,074	66.1	+7.3
Labor	Douglas McFarlane	6,711	33.9	−7.3
Liberal hold		Swing	+7.3	

=== Armidale ===
1968 New South Wales state election: Armidale
Party	Candidate	Votes	%	±%
Country	Davis Hughes	12,186	66.9	0.0
Labor	Joseph Dawson	6,015	33.1	0.0
Total formal votes		18,201	1.8	
Informal votes		338	1.8	
Turnout		18,539	94.7	
Country hold		Swing	0.0	

=== Ashfield ===
1968 New South Wales state election: Ashfield
Party	Candidate	Votes	%	±%
Liberal	David Hunter	13,838	56.9	−1.0
Labor	Charles Maddocks	10,481	43.1	+1.0
Total formal votes		24,319	96.6	
Informal votes		848	3.4	
Turnout		25,167	92.5	
Liberal win		(new seat)		

=== Auburn ===
1968 New South Wales state election: Auburn
Party	Candidate	Votes	%	±%
Labor	Peter Cox	16,784	64.5	+5.6
Liberal	Gregory Ricardo	9,230	35.5	−5.6
Total formal votes		26,014	97.1	
Informal votes		783	2.9	
Turnout		26,797	94.7	
Labor hold		Swing	+5.6	

=== Balmain ===
1968 New South Wales state election: Balmain
Party	Candidate	Votes	%	±%
Labor	Roger Degen	12,974	50.0	−14.5
Independent	Nick Origlass	6,794	26.2	+26.2
Liberal	Peter Middleton	6,174	23.8	−4.5
Total formal votes		25,942	96.5	
Informal votes		950	3.5	
Turnout		26,892	94.3	
Two-party-preferred result
Labor	Roger Degen	17,928	69.1	−1.2
Liberal	Peter Middleton	8,014	30.9	+1.2
Labor hold		Swing	−1.2	

- The two candidate preferred vote was not counted between the Labor and Independent candidates for Balmain.

=== Bankstown ===
1968 New South Wales state election: Bankstown
Party	Candidate	Votes	%	±%
Labor	Nick Kearns	15,256	59.3	+4.5
Liberal	John Ghent	10,455	40.7	−0.5
Total formal votes		25,711	97.0	
Informal votes		795	3.0	
Turnout		26,506	94.9	
Labor hold		Swing	+1.3	

=== Barwon ===
1968 New South Wales state election: Barwon
Party	Candidate	Votes	%	±%
Country	Geoff Crawford	10,668	53.2	−6.6
Labor	Cecil Newton	6,450	32.2	−8.6
New Staters	David Aiken	2,935	14.6	+14.6
Total formal votes		20,053	98.0	
Informal votes		414	2.0	
Turnout		20,467	94.4	
Two-party-preferred result
Country	Geoff Crawford	12,690	63.3	+3.5
Labor	Cecil Newton	7,363	36.7	−3.5
Country hold		Swing	+3.5	

=== Bass Hill ===
1968 New South Wales state election: Bass Hill
Party	Candidate	Votes	%	±%
Labor	Clarrie Earl	15,052	56.4	+0.4
Liberal	Neil Davis	11,648	43.6	+6.0
Total formal votes		26,700	96.4	
Informal votes		984	3.6	
Turnout		27,684	94.7	
Labor hold		Swing	−1.9	

=== Bathurst ===
1968 New South Wales state election: Bathurst
Party	Candidate	Votes	%	±%
Country	Clive Osborne	11,245	56.1	+27.6
Labor	Ken Fry	8,814	43.9	−8.2
Total formal votes		20,059	98.5	
Informal votes		314	1.5	
Turnout		20,373	96.9	
Country gain from Labor		Swing	+11.4	

Gus Kelly (Labor) died in 1967 and Clive Osborne (Country) won the seat at the resulting by-election.

=== Blacktown ===
1968 New South Wales state election: Blacktown
Party	Candidate	Votes	%	±%
Labor	Jim Southee	13,751	54.0	+4.2
Liberal	Ralph Stewart	9,781	38.4	−8.8
Democratic Labor	Kenneth Brown	1,944	7.6	+7.6
Total formal votes		25,476	96.4	
Informal votes		959	3.6	
Turnout		26,435	94.6	
Two-party-preferred result
Labor	Jim Southee	14,140	55.5	+4.8
Liberal	Ralph Stewart	11,336	44.5	−4.8
Labor hold		Swing	+4.8	

=== Bligh ===
1968 New South Wales state election: Bligh
Party	Candidate	Votes	%	±%
Liberal	John Barraclough	11,954	57.2	+3.7
Labor	Tom Morey	7,496	35.9	−8.0
Democratic Labor	Henry Bader	818	3.9	+1.3
Independent	Peter Clyne	630	3.0	+3.0
Total formal votes		20,898	96.4	
Informal votes		773	3.6	
Turnout		21,671	89.5	
Two-party-preferred result
Liberal	John Barraclough	12,923	61.8	+6.3
Labor	Thomas Morey	7,975	38.2	−6.3
Liberal hold		Swing	+6.3	

=== Blue Mountains ===
1968 New South Wales state election: Blue Mountains
Party	Candidate	Votes	%	±%
Independent	Harold Coates	9,991	56.1	+10.1
Labor	James Robson	7,118	40.5	−6.9
Democratic Labor	David Westgate	468	2.7	−3.9
Total formal votes		17,577	98.5	
Informal votes		272	1.5	
Turnout		17,849	95.6	
Two-candidate-preferred result
Independent	Harold Coates	10,247	58.3	+6.9
Labor	James Robson	7,330	41.7	−6.9
Independent win		(new seat)		

=== Bondi ===
1968 New South Wales state election: Bondi
Party	Candidate	Votes	%	±%
Labor	Syd Einfeld	12,054	54.8	+2.9
Liberal	James Markham	9,938	45.2	−2.9
Total formal votes		21,992	97.0	
Informal votes		689	3.0	
Turnout		22,681	93.0	
Labor hold		Swing	+2.9	

=== Broken Hill ===
1968 New South Wales state election: Broken Hill
Party	Candidate	Votes	%	±%
Labor	Lew Johnstone	14,255	70.8	
Country	Edward Brown	5,872	29.2	
Total formal votes		20,127	98.2	
Informal votes		363	1.8	
Turnout		20,490	91.1	
Labor win		(new seat)		

Broken Hill was a new seat, and consisted of parts of the abolished districts of Cobar and Sturt and was the first time since 1913 where all of the town of Broken Hill was in the one district. Lew Johnstone (Labor) was the member for Cobar. The member for Sturt, William Wattison (Labor), did not contest the election.

=== Bulli ===
1968 New South Wales state election: Bulli
Party	Candidate	Votes	%	±%
Labor	Rex Jackson	13,419	64.5	+7.3
Liberal	Ronald White	7,395	35.5	+6.8
Total formal votes		20,814	97.5	
Informal votes		541	2.5	
Turnout		21,355	95.1	
Labor hold		Swing	−2.5	

=== Burrendong ===
1968 New South Wales state election: Burrendong
Party	Candidate	Votes	%	±%
Country	Roger Wotton	7,727	36.7	+10.4
Labor	Paul Khoury	7,448	35.4	−10.2
Liberal	Richard Evans	5,867	27.9	−0.2
Total formal votes		21,042	98.4	
Informal votes		343	1.6	
Turnout		21,385	95.5	
Two-party-preferred result
Country	Roger Wotton	12,389	58.9	+6.1
Labor	Paul Khoury	8,653	41.1	−6.1
Country win		(new seat)		

=== Burrinjuck ===
1968 New South Wales state election: Burrinjuck
Party	Candidate	Votes	%	±%
Labor	Bill Sheahan	10,980	54.2	−1.8
Country	Douglas Boag	5,611	27.7	−5.6
Liberal	Leon Garry	2,804	13.8	+3.1
Democratic Labor	Anthony Abbey	870	4.3	+4.3
Total formal votes		20,265	98.4	
Informal votes		329	1.6	
Turnout		20,594	95.8	
Two-party-preferred result
Labor	Bill Sheahan	11,322	55.9	−0.7
Country	Douglas Boag	8,943	44.1	+0.7
Labor hold		Swing	−0.7	

=== Burwood ===
1968 New South Wales state election: Burwood
Party	Candidate	Votes	%	±%
Liberal	John Jackett	12,030	51.7	+9.8
Labor	Antony Kelly	6,857	29.5	−0.3
Independent	Ben Doig	4,364	18.8	−9.5
Total formal votes		23,251	96.9	
Informal votes		739	3.1	
Turnout		23,990	91.8	
Two-party-preferred result
Liberal	John Jackett	15,700	67.5	+2.0
Labor	Antony Kelly	7,551	32.5	−2.0
Liberal hold		Swing	+2.0	

=== Byron ===
1968 New South Wales state election: Byron
Party	Candidate	Votes	%	±%
Country	Stanley Stephens	12,646	60.2	−4.0
Labor	James Constable	8,342	39.8	+4.0
Total formal votes		20,988	98.3	
Informal votes		353	1.6	
Turnout		21,341	94.5	
Country hold		Swing	−4.0	

=== Campbelltown ===
1968 New South Wales state election: Campbelltown
Party	Candidate	Votes	%	±%
Liberal	Max Dunbier	10,734	52.4	−3.8
Labor	Francis Ward	9,739	47.6	+3.8
Total formal votes		20,473	97.3	
Informal votes		568	2.7	
Turnout		21,041	93.7	
Liberal win		(new seat)		

=== Canterbury ===
1968 New South Wales state election: Canterbury
Party	Candidate	Votes	%	±%
Labor	Kevin Stewart	14,272	55.2	−1.9
Liberal	Stanley Squire	10,371	40.1	−2.8
Communist	Jack Mundey	1,226	4.7	+4.7
Total formal votes		25,869	96.7	
Informal votes		891	3.3	
Turnout		26,760	93.9	
Two-party-preferred result
Labor	Kevin Stewart	15,130	58.5	+1.4
Liberal	Stanley Squire	10,739	41.5	−1.4
Labor hold		Swing	+1.4	

=== Castlereagh ===
1968 New South Wales state election: Castlereagh
Party	Candidate	Votes	%	±%
Labor	Jack Renshaw	9,491	53.2	−0.8
Country	Doug Moppett	4,359	24.5	+3.3
Liberal	Allan Connell	3,979	22.3	+1.7
Total formal votes		17,829	98.4	
Informal votes		283	1.6	
Turnout		18,112	93.8	
Two-party-preferred result
Labor	Jack Renshaw	9,770	54.8	−2.4
Country	Doug Moppett	8,059	45.2	+2.4
Labor hold		Swing	−2.4	

=== Cessnock ===
1968 New South Wales state election: Cessnock
Party	Candidate	Votes	%	±%
Labor	George Neilly	13,528	65.9	−11.7
Independent	Robert Brown	7,009	34.1	+34.1
Total formal votes		20,537	98.6	
Informal votes		283	1.4	
Turnout		20,820	96.5	
Labor hold		Swing	N/A	

=== Clarence ===
1968 New South Wales state election: Clarence
Party	Candidate	Votes	%	±%
Country	Bill Weiley	13,470	64.3	−6.2
New Staters	Garry Nehl	7,484	35.7	+35.7
Total formal votes		20,954	98.2	
Informal votes		385	1.8	
Turnout		21,339	96.2	
Country hold		Swing	−6.2	

=== Collaroy ===
1968 New South Wales state election: Collaroy
Party	Candidate	Votes	%	±%
Liberal	Robert Askin	18,415	71.0	−2.2
Labor	David Lawler	7,532	29.0	+4.6
Total formal votes		25,947	96.5	
Informal votes		938	3.5	
Turnout		26,885	93.3	
Liberal hold		Swing	−4.4	

=== Coogee ===
1968 New South Wales state election: Coogee
Party	Candidate	Votes	%	±%
Liberal	Kevin Ellis	11,924	50.6	+2.6
Labor	Lou Walsh	9,873	41.9	−5.7
Democratic Labor	John Cunningham	1,225	5.2	+0.8
Independent	Lincoln Oppenheimer	525	2.2	+2.2
Total formal votes		23,547	97.2	
Informal votes		687	2.8	
Turnout		24,234	92.7	
Two-party-preferred result
Liberal	Kevin Ellis	13,167	55.9	+4.2
Labor	Lou Walsh	10,380	44.1	−4.2
Liberal hold		Swing	+4.2	

=== Cook's River ===
1968 New South Wales state election: Cook's River
Party	Candidate	Votes	%	±%
Labor	Tom Cahill	17,821	69.2	−0.7
Liberal	James Harris	7,962	30.9	+0.7
Total formal votes		25,783	96.6	
Informal votes		895	3.4	
Turnout		26,678	93.3	
Labor hold		Swing	−0.7	

=== Corrimal ===
1968 New South Wales state election: Corrimal
Party	Candidate	Votes	%	±%
Labor	Laurie Kelly	10,125	54.1	
Liberal	Donald Heggie	5,321	28.4	
Independent	Charles Birch	2,604	13.9	
Independent	Mary Hargrave	671	3.6	
Total formal votes		18,721	96.8	
Informal votes		621	3.2	
Turnout		19,342	95.6	
Two-party-preferred result
Labor	Laurie Kelly	12,003	64.1	+4.4
Liberal	Donald Heggie	6,718	35.9	−4.4
Labor win		(new seat)		

=== Cronulla ===
1968 New South Wales state election: Cronulla
Party	Candidate	Votes	%	±%
Liberal	Ian Griffith	15,231	59.2	−2.9
Labor	John Cudmore	9,126	35.5	+0.8
Democratic Labor	Kevin Ryan	750	2.9	+2.9
Communist	Alexander Elphinston	622	2.4	−0.8
Total formal votes		25,729	97.7	
Informal votes		601	2.3	
Turnout		26,330	94.8	
Two-party-preferred result
Liberal	Ian Griffith	15,955	62.0	−0.7
Labor	John Cudmore	9,774	38.0	+0.7
Liberal hold		Swing	−0.7	

=== Drummoyne ===
1968 New South Wales state election: Drummoyne
Party	Candidate	Votes	%	±%
Labor	Reg Coady	12,479	49.5	
Liberal	John Howard	11,659	46.2	
Democratic Labor	Mick Carroll	1,089	4.3	
Total formal votes		25,227	96.9	
Informal votes		800	3.1	
Turnout		26,027	94.3	
Two-party-preferred result
Labor	Reg Coady	13,033	51.7	+4.7
Liberal	John Howard	12,194	48.3	−4.7
Labor notional gain from Liberal		Swing	+4.7	

- Drummoyne became a notionally Liberal seat in the redistribution.

=== Dubbo ===
1968 New South Wales state election: Dubbo
Party	Candidate	Votes	%	±%
Liberal	John Mason	13,107	65.1	+30.9
Labor	Robert Scarff	7,010	34.9	−0.1
Total formal votes		20,117	98.8	
Informal votes		246	1.2	
Turnout		20,363	95.5	
Liberal hold		Swing	+2.6	

=== Earlwood ===
1968 New South Wales state election: Earlwood
Party	Candidate	Votes	%	±%
Liberal	Eric Willis	16,289	62.7	+2.8
Labor	Cavell Becher	9,689	37.3	−2.8
Total formal votes		25,978	97.3	
Informal votes		710	2.7	
Turnout		26,688	95.6	
Liberal hold		Swing	+2.8	

=== East Hills ===
1968 New South Wales state election: East Hills
Party	Candidate	Votes	%	±%
Labor	Joe Kelly	14,625	52.5	−0.8
Liberal	John Colley	6,758	24.2	−4.8
Independent	Harold McIlveen	6,502	23.3	+11.6
Total formal votes		27,885	97.8	
Informal votes		632	2.2	
Turnout		28,517	95.9	
Two-party-preferred result
Labor	Joe Kelly	16,576	59.4	+0.7
Liberal	John Colley	11,309	40.6	−0.7
Labor hold		Swing	+0.7	

=== Eastwood ===
1968 New South Wales state election: Eastwood
Party	Candidate	Votes	%	±%
Liberal	Jim Clough	17,589	69.7	+16.2
Labor	George Keniry	7,636	30.3	+4.6
Total formal votes		25,225	97.0	
Informal votes		773	3.0	
Turnout		25,998	94.1	
Liberal hold		Swing	+3.0	

=== Fairfield ===
1968 New South Wales state election: Fairfield
Party	Candidate	Votes	%	±%
Labor	Eric Bedford	15,632	57.5	+0.4
Liberal	Frank Calabro	11,561	42.5	+4.5
Total formal votes		27,193	96.5	
Informal votes		982	3.5	
Turnout		28,175	94.9	
Labor hold		Swing	−0.5	

=== Fuller ===
1968 New South Wales state election: Fuller
Party	Candidate	Votes	%	±%
Liberal	Peter Coleman	12,636	49.1	
Labor	Frank Downing	12,035	46.8	
Democratic Labor	Mel Antcliff	1,051	4.1	
Total formal votes		25,722	97.4	
Informal votes		698	2.6	
Turnout		26,420	94.8	
Two-party-preferred result
Liberal	Peter Coleman	13,545	52.7	+2.4
Labor	Frank Downing	12,177	47.3	−2.4
Liberal win		(new seat)		

=== Georges River ===
1968 New South Wales state election: Georges River
Party	Candidate	Votes	%	±%
Liberal	Douglas Cross	16,036	58.7	+2.3
Labor	Ernest Curlisa	11,285	41.3	−2.3
Total formal votes		27,321	97.5	
Informal votes		687	2.5	
Turnout		28,008	95.3	
Liberal hold		Swing	+2.3	

=== Gloucester ===
1968 New South Wales state election: Gloucester
Party	Candidate	Votes	%	±%
Country	Leon Punch	11,152	59.8	−13.4
Labor	Philip Jackson	4,305	23.1	+23.1
Independent	Bob Scott	1,325	7.1	−19.7
Independent	Charles Buckingham	973	5.2	+5.2
Independent	John Tully	891	4.8	+4.8
Total formal votes		18,646	98.0	
Informal votes		375	2.0	
Turnout		19,021	95.1	
Two-party-preferred result
Country	Leon Punch	13,066	70.1	−3.1
Labor	Philip Jackson	5,580	29.9	+29.9
Country hold		Swing	−3.1	

=== Gordon ===
1968 New South Wales state election: Gordon
Party	Candidate	Votes	%	±%
Liberal	Harry Jago	20,099	81.8	−6.4
Labor	Norman Hanscombe	3,127	12.7	+12.7
Democratic Labor	Dominique Droulers	1,346	5.5	−6.3
Total formal votes		24,572	97.0	
Informal votes		771	3.0	
Turnout		25,343	92.8	
Two-party-preferred result
Liberal	Harry Jago	21,176	86.2	−2.0
Labor	Norman Hanscombe	3,396	13.8	+13.8
Liberal hold		Swing	−2.0	

=== Gosford ===
1968 New South Wales state election: Gosford
Party	Candidate	Votes	%	±%
Liberal	Ted Humphries	11,623	48.7	+1.5
Labor	Peter Westerway	11,438	47.9	+2.8
Democratic Labor	Thomas Crass	813	3.4	−4.3
Total formal votes		23,874	98.2	
Informal votes		446	1.8	
Turnout		24,320	96.1	
Two-party-preferred result
Liberal	Ted Humphries	12,271	51.4	+1.0
Labor	Peter Westerway	11,603	48.6	−1.0
Liberal hold		Swing	+1.0	

=== Goulburn ===
1968 New South Wales state election: Goulburn
Party	Candidate	Votes	%	±%
Country	Ron Brewer	11,940	64.9	+36.5
Labor	John Longhurst	5,853	31.8	−14.0
Democratic Labor	Kenneth Clancy	598	3.3	+3.3
Total formal votes		18,391	99.0	
Informal votes		191	1.0	
Turnout		18,582	95.7	
Two-party-preferred result
Country	Ron Brewer	12,418	67.5	+14.8
Labor	John Longhurst	5,973	32.5	−14.8
Country hold		Swing	+14.8	

=== Granville ===
1968 New South Wales state election: Granville
Party	Candidate	Votes	%	±%
Labor	Pat Flaherty	15,704	60.8	+1.9
Liberal	Stewart Allan	10,134	39.2	+5.4
Total formal votes		25,838	96.8	
Informal votes		860	3.2	
Turnout		26,698	94.0	
Labor hold		Swing	+0.5	

=== Hamilton ===
1968 New South Wales state election: Hamilton
Party	Candidate	Votes	%	±%
Labor	Robert McCartney	12,458	60.1	−4.2
Liberal	James Reeves	8,286	39.9	+4.2
Total formal votes		20,744	97.9	
Informal votes		434	2.1	
Turnout		21,178	94.3	
Labor hold		Swing	−4.2	

=== Hawkesbury ===
1968 New South Wales state election: Hawkesbury
Party	Candidate	Votes	%	±%
Liberal	Bernie Deane	10,313	48.4	
Labor	Dick Klugman	8,955	42.0	
Democratic Labor	Leslie Clarke	1,432	6.7	
Republican	William Murray	428	2.0	
Independent	Rodney Rose	177	0.8	
Total formal votes		21,305	97.4	
Informal votes		558	2.6	
Turnout		21,863	91.4	
Two-party-preferred result
Liberal	Bernie Deane	11,713	55.0	−5.8
Labor	Dick Klugman	9,592	45.0	+5.8
Liberal hold		Swing	−5.8	

=== Hornsby ===
1968 New South Wales state election: Hornsby
Party	Candidate	Votes	%	±%
Liberal	John Maddison	18,929	69.1	−0.5
Labor	Kenneth Reid	6,882	25.1	+0.3
Democratic Labor	Anthony Felton	1,591	5.8	+0.1
Total formal votes		27,402	97.0	
Informal votes		849	3.0	
Turnout		28,251	93.9	
Two-party-preferred result
Liberal	John Maddison	20,202	73.7	+1.4
Labor	Kenneth Reid	7,200	26.3	−1.4
Liberal hold		Swing	+1.4	

=== Hurstville ===
1968 New South Wales state election: Hurstville
Party	Candidate	Votes	%	±%
Liberal	Tom Mead	14,034	49.6	+2.7
Labor	Bill Rigby	12,951	45.8	−2.9
Democratic Labor	Kevin Davis	1,322	4.7	+0.3
Total formal votes		28,307	97.7	
Informal votes		669	2.3	
Turnout		28,976	95.1	
Two-party-preferred result
Liberal	Tom Mead	15,178	53.6	+3.0
Labor	Bill Rigby	13,129	46.4	−3.0
Liberal hold		Swing	+3.0	

=== Kahibah ===
1968 New South Wales state election: Kahibah
Party	Candidate	Votes	%	±%
Labor	Jack Stewart	12,949	58.5	−5.1
Liberal	Roy Hammond	7,166	32.4	−4.1
Democratic Labor	William Crane	1,055	4.8	+4.8
Communist	Darrell Dawson	691	3.1	+3.1
Independent	William Fricker	259	1.2	+1.2
Total formal votes		22,120	97.6	
Informal votes		540	2.4	
Turnout		22,660	95.2	
Two-party-preferred result
Labor	Jack Stewart	13,843	62.6	−1.0
Liberal	Roy Hammond	8,277	37.4	+1.0
Labor hold		Swing	−1.0	

=== Kembla ===
1968 New South Wales state election: Kembla
Party	Candidate	Votes	%	±%
Labor	George Petersen	13,840	61.8	
Liberal	Jack Walker	6,292	28.1	
Independent	Teresa Gibbons	1,304	5.8	
Communist	Melva Merletto	561	2.5	
Independent	Thomas Malcolm	399	1.8	
Total formal votes		22,396	96.3	
Informal votes		864	3.7	
Turnout		23,260	94.6	
Two-party-preferred result
Labor	George Petersen	14,934	66.7	
Liberal	Jack Walker	7,462	33.3	
Labor win		(new seat)		

=== King ===
1968 New South Wales state election: King
Party	Candidate	Votes	%	±%
Labor	Albert Sloss	16,197	67.2	+0.6
Liberal	Alfred Van Der Poorten	4,804	19.9	−5.6
Communist	Brian Crispin	2,195	9.1	+1.1
Independent	Martyn Harper	920	3.8	+3.8
Total formal votes		24,116	95.6	
Informal votes		1,106	4.4	
Turnout		25,222	91.9	
Two-party-preferred result
Labor	Albert Sloss	18,413	76.4	+3.3
Liberal	Alfred Van Der Poorten	5,703	23.6	−3.3
Labor hold		Swing	+3.3	

=== Kirribilli ===
1968 New South Wales state election: Kirribilli
Party	Candidate	Votes	%	±%
Liberal	John Waddy	15,534	62.1	+10.5
Labor	Alan Newbury	8,079	32.3	−6.4
Democratic Labor	Luigi Lamprati	1,410	5.6	+5.6
Total formal votes		25,023	96.9	
Informal votes		797	3.1	
Turnout		25,820	90.7	
Two-party-preferred result
Liberal	John Waddy	16,662	66.6	+3.6
Labor	Alan Newbury	8,361	33.4	−3.6
Liberal hold		Swing	+3.6	

=== Kogarah ===
1968 New South Wales state election: Kogarah
Party	Candidate	Votes	%	±%
Labor	Bill Crabtree	13,837	51.8	+0.2
Liberal	Albert Oakey	11,889	44.5	−1.2
Democratic Labor	Brian Harnett	986	3.7	+1.0
Total formal votes		26,712	97.9	
Informal votes		568	2.1	
Turnout		27,280	94.3	
Two-party-preferred result
Labor	Bill Crabtree	14,034	52.5	+0.4
Liberal	Albert Oakey	12,678	47.5	−0.4
Labor hold		Swing	+0.4	

=== Lake Macquarie ===
1968 New South Wales state election: Lake Macquarie
Party	Candidate	Votes	%	±%
Labor	Jim Simpson	13,608	64.4	−7.9
Liberal	Malcolm Blackshaw	7,517	35.6	+7.9
Total formal votes		21,125	97.7	
Informal votes		496	2.3	
Turnout		21,621	94.4	
Labor hold		Swing	−7.9	

=== Lakemba ===
1968 New South Wales state election: Lakemba
Party	Candidate	Votes	%	±%
Labor	Vince Durick	13,723	52.3	−4.4
Liberal	Malcolm Broun	9,722	37.0	−6.3
Independent	Lancelot Hutchinson	1,436	5.5	+5.5
Democratic Labor	Annette Andrew	1,146	4.4	+4.4
Independent	Francis Ball	218	0.8	+0.8
Total formal votes		26,245	96.6	
Informal votes		913	3.4	
Turnout		27,158	95.1	
Two-party-preferred result
Labor	Vince Durick	15,123	57.6	+0.9
Liberal	Malcolm Broun	11,122	42.4	−0.9
Labor hold		Swing	+0.9	

=== Lane Cove ===
1968 New South Wales state election: Lane Cove
Party	Candidate	Votes	%	±%
Liberal	Ken McCaw	18,170	70.8	−10.0
Labor	James Westerway	6,071	23.6	+23.6
Democratic Labor	Antony Liddle	1,439	5.6	−13.6
Total formal votes		25,680	96.6	
Informal votes		906	3.4	
Turnout		26,586	93.1	
Two-party-preferred result
Liberal	Ken McCaw	19,321	75.2	−5.6
Labor	James Westerway	6,359	24.8	+24.8
Liberal hold		Swing	−5.6	

=== Lismore ===
1968 New South Wales state election: Lismore
Party	Candidate	Votes	%	±%
Country	Bruce Duncan	13,499	68.2	+36.4
Labor	Barrie Eggins	6,304	31.8	−14.0
Total formal votes		19,803	99.3	
Informal votes		136	0.7	
Turnout		19,939	95.9	
Country hold		Swing	+16.1	

=== Liverpool ===
1968 New South Wales state election: Liverpool
Party	Candidate	Votes	%	±%
Labor	Jack Mannix	15,775	56.2	+1.0
Liberal	Kenneth Laing	10,148	36.2	−0.6
Democratic Labor	Edward Connolly	1,608	5.7	−0.6
Communist	Michael Tubbs	533	1.9	+0.2
Total formal votes		28,064	96.2	
Informal votes		1,105	3.8	
Turnout		29,169	92.3	
Two-party-preferred result
Labor	Jack Mannix	16,523	58.9	+1.6
Liberal	Kenneth Laing	11,541	41.1	−1.6
Labor hold		Swing	+1.6	

=== Maitland ===
1968 New South Wales state election: Maitland
Party	Candidate	Votes	%	±%
Liberal	Milton Morris	14,121	66.2	+2.0
Labor	George Lyons	6,085	28.5	−7.3
Democratic Labor	Aubrey Barr	1,128	5.3	+5.3
Total formal votes		21,334	98.4	
Informal votes		350	1.6	
Turnout		21,684	96.1	
Two-party-preferred result
Liberal	Milton Morris	15,023	70.4	+6.2
Labor	George Lyons	6,311	29.6	−6.2
Liberal hold		Swing	+6.2	

=== Manly ===
1968 New South Wales state election: Manly
Party	Candidate	Votes	%	±%
Liberal	Douglas Darby	16,426	68.8	+32.8
Labor	Daniel Dwyer	6,287	26.3	+26.3
Democratic Labor	Ann Macken	771	3.2	+3.2
Independent	Vincent Rizner	232	1.0	+1.0
Independent	Eric Riches	152	0.6	+0.6
Total formal votes		23,868	96.5	
Informal votes		863	3.5	
Turnout		24,731	93.4	
Two-party-preferred result
Liberal	Douglas Darby	17,235	72.2	+31.1
Labor	Daniel Dwyer	6,633	27.8	+27.8
Member changed to Liberal from Independent Liberal		Swing	N/A	

=== Maroubra ===
1968 New South Wales state election: Maroubra
Party	Candidate	Votes	%	±%
Labor	Bill Haigh	13,014	53.0	−3.2
Liberal	Desmond Cahill	11,551	47.0	+10.9
Total formal votes		24,565	97.1	
Informal votes		734	2.9	
Turnout		25,299	94.0	
Labor hold		Swing	−8.0	

=== Marrickville ===
1968 New South Wales state election: Marrickville
Party	Candidate	Votes	%	±%
Labor	Norm Ryan	15,060	64.1	+0.4
Liberal	Jonathan Fowler	8,427	35.9	−0.4
Total formal votes		23,487	96.3	
Informal votes		908	3.7	
Turnout		24,395	92.6	
Labor hold		Swing	+0.4	

=== Merrylands ===
1968 New South Wales state election: Merrylands
Party	Candidate	Votes	%	±%
Labor	Jack Ferguson	17,326	63.3	
Liberal	Stanislaus Kelly	10,048	36.7	
Total formal votes		27,374	96.4	
Informal votes		1,031	3.6	
Turnout		28,405	94.1	
Labor win		(new seat)		

=== Monaro ===
1968 New South Wales state election: Monaro
Party	Candidate	Votes	%	±%
Liberal	Steve Mauger	11,572	56.1	+18.6
Labor	David Lowrey	9,049	43.9	+0.3
Total formal votes		20,621	97.9	
Informal votes		439	2.1	
Turnout		21,060	93.3	
Liberal hold		Swing	+2.7	

=== Mosman ===
1968 New South Wales state election: Mosman
Party	Candidate	Votes	%	±%
Liberal	Pat Morton	18,571	73.5	−8.8
Labor	Lipanjka Dezelin	5,049	20.0	+20.0
Democratic Labor	Geoffrey Hicks	1,631	6.5	−11.2
Total formal votes		25,251	96.2	
Informal votes		1,002	3.8	
Turnout		26,253	91.7	
Two-party-preferred result
Liberal	Pat Morton	19,876	78.7	−3.6
Labor	Lipanjka Dezelin	5,375	21.3	+21.3
Liberal hold		Swing	−3.6	

=== Murray ===
1968 New South Wales state election: Murray
Party	Candidate	Votes	%	±%
Independent	Joe Lawson	6,326	32.7	+32.7
Labor	Henry O'Callaghan	4,676	24.2	−2.4
Country	Bruce Birrell	3,156	16.3	−57.1
Country	Donald Kendell	2,643	13.7	+13.7
Liberal	Michael Butler	1,710	8.8	+8.8
Democratic Labor	Victor Groutsch	847	4.4	+4.4
Total formal votes		19,358	96.9	
Informal votes		609	3.1	
Turnout		19,967	91.7	
Two-candidate-preferred result
Independent	Joe Lawson	11,521	59.5	+59.5
Country	Bruce Birrell	7,837	40.5	−32.9
Member changed to Independent from Country		Swing		

=== Murrumbidgee ===
1968 New South Wales state election: Murrumbidgee
Party	Candidate	Votes	%	±%
Labor	Al Grassby	12,871	63.0	+13.8
Country	Eric Baldwin	4,570	22.4	−11.2
Liberal	Verdon Letheren	2,238	10.9	−3.3
Democratic Labor	Leslie Kennedy	756	3.7	+0.7
Total formal votes		20,435	98.0	
Informal votes		424	2.0	
Turnout		20,859	94.2	
Two-party-preferred result
Labor	Al Grassby	13,246	64.8	+13.1
Country	Eric Baldwin	7,189	35.2	−13.1
Labor hold		Swing	+13.1	

=== Nepean ===
1968 New South Wales state election: Nepean
Party	Candidate	Votes	%	±%
Liberal	Ron Dunbier	10,915	52.3	+2.4
Labor	Alfred Bennett	9,955	47.7	+6.0
Total formal votes		20,870	97.5	
Informal votes		544	2.5	
Turnout		21,414	94.8	
Liberal hold		Swing	−3.0	

=== Newcastle ===
1968 New South Wales state election: Newcastle
Party	Candidate	Votes	%	±%
Labor	Arthur Wade	9,960	47.6	−12.8
Liberal	Malcolm Barnes	5,790	27.6	−7.4
Independent	Douglas McDougall	5,190	24.8	+24.8
Total formal votes		20,940	98.1	
Informal votes		397	1.9	
Turnout		21,337	94.6	
Two-party-preferred result
Labor	Arthur Wade	11,361	54.3	−9.8
Liberal	Malcolm Barnes	9,579	45.7	+9.8
Labor hold		Swing	−9.8	

=== Northcott ===
1968 New South Wales state election: Northcott
Party	Candidate	Votes	%	±%
Liberal	Jim Cameron	19,330	76.1	
Labor	Pauline Unsworth	4,831	19.0	
Democratic Labor	John Kennedy	1,252	4.9	
Total formal votes		25,413	96.5	
Informal votes		912	3.5	
Turnout		26,325	93.1	
Two-party-preferred result
Liberal	Jim Cameron	20,332	80.0	+2.3
Labor	Pauline Unsworth	5,081	20.0	−2.3
Liberal win		(new seat)		

=== Orange ===
1968 New South Wales state election: Orange
Party	Candidate	Votes	%	±%
Country	Charles Cutler	10,698	56.4	−8.4
Labor	Reginald Cutcliffe	8,267	43.6	+8.4
Total formal votes		18,965	98.6	
Informal votes		274	1.4	
Turnout		19,239	95.6	
Country hold		Swing	−8.4	

=== Oxley ===
1968 New South Wales state election: Oxley
Party	Candidate	Votes	%	±%
Country	Bruce Cowan	16,765	80.5	+80.5
Independent	Joe Cordner	4,063	19.5	+17.6
Total formal votes		20,828	97.7	
Informal votes		500	2.3	
Turnout		21,328	95.5	
Country gain from Liberal		Swing	N/A	

=== Parramatta ===
1968 New South Wales state election: Parramatta
Party	Candidate	Votes	%	±%
Labor	Dan Mahoney	14,501	52.4	−0.1
Liberal	Hilton Robinson	11,109	40.1	−3.7
Rates and Taxpayers	Leonard Kiernan	909	3.3	+3.3
Democratic Labor	John Stewart	615	2.2	−1.5
Independent	Wayne Merton	550	2.0	+2.0
Total formal votes		27,684	96.8	
Informal votes		905	3.2	
Turnout		28,589	94.2	
Two-party-preferred result
Labor	Dan Mahoney	15,354	55.5	+2.3
Liberal	Hilton Robinson	12,330	44.5	−2.3
Labor hold		Swing	+2.3	

=== Phillip ===
1968 New South Wales state election: Phillip
Party	Candidate	Votes	%	±%
Labor	Pat Hills	16,829	68.8	+10.1
Liberal	Terence Tomlin	5,726	23.4	−8.8
Democratic Labor	Doris Brown	1,901	7.8	+7.8
Total formal votes		24,458	95.3	
Informal votes		1,194	4.7	
Turnout		25,650	90.0	
Two-party-preferred result
Labor	Pat Hills	17,209	70.4	−2.5
Liberal	Terence Tomlin	7,247	29.6	+2.5
Labor hold		Swing	−2.5	

=== Raleigh ===
1968 New South Wales state election: Raleigh
Party	Candidate	Votes	%	±%
Country	Jim Brown	12,466	56.0	−8.2
Labor	Robert Melville	6,272	28.2	−7.6
New Staters	Aubrey Barker	3,514	15.8	+15.8
Total formal votes		22,252	98.7	
Informal votes		286	1.3	
Turnout		22,538	96.1	
Two-party-preferred result
Country	Jim Brown	15,102	67.9	+3.7
Labor	Robert Melville	7,150	32.1	−3.7
Country hold		Swing	+3.7	

=== Randwick ===
1968 New South Wales state election: Randwick
Party	Candidate	Votes	%	±%
Labor	Lionel Bowen	12,652	52.6	−2.8
Liberal	John McLaughlin	10,471	43.6	−1.1
Democratic Labor	Cornelius Woodbury	911	3.8	+3.8
Total formal votes		24,034	96.8	
Informal votes		784	3.2	
Turnout		24,818	92.8	
Two-party-preferred result
Labor	Lionel Bowen	12,834	53.4	−1.9
Liberal	John McLaughlin	11,200	46.6	+1.9
Labor hold		Swing	−1.9	

=== Rockdale ===
1968 New South Wales state election: Rockdale
Party	Candidate	Votes	%	±%
Labor	Brian Bannon	14,420	55.1	+2.4
Liberal	Harold Heslehurst	10,860	41.5	−2.7
Democratic Labor	Peter Height	916	3.5	+3.5
Total formal votes		26,196	97.2	
Informal votes		759	2.8	
Turnout		26,955	94.2	
Two-party-preferred result
Labor	Brian Bannon	14,603	55.7	+1.4
Liberal	Harold Heslehurst	11,593	44.3	−1.4
Labor hold		Swing	+1.4	

=== South Coast ===
1968 New South Wales state election: South Coast
Party	Candidate	Votes	%	±%
Liberal	Jack Beale	12,165	57.3	−10.8
Independent	John Hatton	9,073	42.7	+10.8
Total formal votes		21,238	98.4	
Informal votes		334	1.6	
Turnout		21,572	94.2	
Liberal hold		Swing	−10.8	

=== Sutherland ===
1968 New South Wales state election: Sutherland
Party	Candidate	Votes	%	±%
Liberal	Tim Walker	13,707	49.3	+0.5
Labor	Tom Dalton	13,105	47.1	−0.9
Democratic Labor	William Goslett	1,002	3.6	+0.4
Total formal votes		27,814	97.5	
Informal votes		706	2.5	
Turnout		28,520	95.4	
Two-party-preferred result
Liberal	Tim Walker	14,403	51.8	+0.8
Labor	Tom Dalton	13,411	48.2	−0.8
Liberal gain from Labor		Swing	+0.8	

- Sutherland became a notionally Liberal seat at the redistribution.

=== Tamworth ===
1968 New South Wales state election: Tamworth
Party	Candidate	Votes	%	±%
Country	Bill Chaffey	10,506	55.7	−3.2
Independent	Stanley Cole	4,976	26.4	+26.4
New Staters	Alexander Dickinson	3,370	17.9	+17.9
Total formal votes		18,852	98.1	
Informal votes		355	1.9	
Turnout		19,207	95.9	
Two-candidate-preferred result
Country	Bill Chaffey	12,191	64.7	+5.8
Independent	Stanley Cole	6,661	35.3	+35.3
Country hold		Swing	+5.8	

=== Temora ===
1968 New South Wales state election: Temora
Party	Candidate	Votes	%	±%
Country	Jim Taylor	12,863	66.0	−4.8
Labor	John O'Hara	4,664	23.9	−5.3
Democratic Labor	Garry Carroll	1,453	7.4	+7.4
Independent	Dorothy Frank	515	2.6	+2.6
Total formal votes		19,495	99.0	
Informal votes		199	1.0	
Turnout		19,694	95.0	
Two-party-preferred result
Country	Jim Taylor	14,282	73.3	+2.5
Labor	John O'Hara	5,213	26.7	−2.5
Country hold		Swing	+2.5	

=== Tenterfield ===
1968 New South Wales state election: Tenterfield
Party	Candidate	Votes	%	±%
Country	Tim Bruxner	11,380	66.9	+9.8
Labor	Ronald Grafton	5,622	33.1	−9.8
Total formal votes		17,002	98.8	
Informal votes		211	1.2	
Turnout		17,213	94.4	
Country hold		Swing	+9.8	

=== The Hills ===
1968 New South Wales state election: The Hills
Party	Candidate	Votes	%	±%
Liberal	Max Ruddock	19,039	64.2	−5.8
Labor	Eli Hirsch	6,567	22.2	−7.8
Independent	Keith Phillis	2,656	9.0	+9.0
Democratic Labor	Michael Fagan	1,378	4.6	+4.6
Total formal votes		29,640	97.0	
Informal votes		923	3.0	
Turnout		30,563	94.4	
Two-party-preferred result
Liberal	Max Ruddock	21,469	72.4	+2.4
Labor	Eli Hirsch	8,171	27.6	−2.4
Liberal hold		Swing	+2.4	

=== Upper Hunter ===
1968 New South Wales state election: Upper Hunter
Party	Candidate	Votes	%	±%
Country	Frank O'Keefe	12,860	65.5	+1.8
Labor	Leo Musgrave	6,785	34.5	−1.8
Total formal votes		19,645	99.1	
Informal votes		184	0.9	
Turnout		19,829	96.0	
Country hold		Swing	+1.8	

=== Vaucluse ===
1968 New South Wales state election: Vaucluse
Party	Candidate	Votes	%	±%
Liberal	Keith Doyle	16,079	71.3	−3.7
Labor	William Ross	4,875	21.6	+21.6
Democratic Labor	Hugh Bartlett	1,611	7.1	−4.9
Total formal votes		22,565	96.4	
Informal votes		842	3.6	
Turnout		23,407	91.2	
Two-party-preferred result
Liberal	Keith Doyle	17,368	77.0	−4.0
Labor	William Ross	5,197	23.0	+23.0
Liberal hold		Swing	−4.0	

=== Wagga Wagga ===
1968 New South Wales state election: Wagga Wagga
Party	Candidate	Votes	%	±%
Liberal	Wal Fife	13,299	68.2	+3.1
Labor	John Skeers	4,984	25.6	−3.3
Democratic Labor	Peter Piltz	1,205	6.2	+0.1
Total formal votes		19,488	98.3	
Informal votes		338	1.7	
Turnout		19,826	93.8	
Two-party-preferred result
Liberal	Wal Fife	14,263	73.2	+3.3
Labor	John Skeers	5,225	26.8	−3.3
Liberal hold		Swing	+3.3	

=== Wakehurst ===
1968 New South Wales state election: Wakehurst
Party	Candidate	Votes	%	±%
Liberal	Dick Healey	18,475	63.6	0.0
Labor	Dorothy Isaksen	8,442	29.1	−3.7
Democratic Labor	Lyle Antcliff	2,115	7.3	+7.3
Total formal votes		29,032	96.8	
Informal votes		965	3.2	
Turnout		29,997	95.0	
Two-party-preferred result
Liberal	Dick Healey	20,167	69.5	+3.0
Labor	Dorothy Isaksen	8,865	30.5	−3.0
Liberal hold		Swing	+3.0	

=== Wallsend ===
1968 New South Wales state election: Wallsend
Party	Candidate	Votes	%	±%
Labor	Ken Booth	15,866	75.8	
Liberal	William Gilchrist	4,347	20.8	
Democratic Labor	Donald Richards	710	3.4	
Total formal votes		20,923	97.4	
Informal votes		560	2.6	
Turnout		21,483	96.2	
Two-party-preferred result
Labor	Ken Booth	16,008	76.5	
Liberal	William Gilchrist	4,915	23.5	
Labor win		(new seat)		

=== Waratah ===
1968 New South Wales state election: Waratah
Party	Candidate	Votes	%	±%
Labor	Sam Jones	12,642	57.9	+9.7
Independent	Frank Purdue	9,206	42.1	−2.9
Total formal votes		21,848	98.0	
Informal votes		449	2.0	
Turnout		22,297	95.4	
Labor hold		Swing	+7.1	

=== Wentworthville ===
1968 New South Wales state election: Wentworthville
Party	Candidate	Votes	%	±%
Labor	Ernie Quinn	15,854	56.5	+5.6
Liberal	Richard Gregory	10,899	38.9	−5.2
Rates and Taxpayers	Albert Hall	1,288	4.6	+4.6
Total formal votes		28,041	97.1	
Informal votes		850	2.9	
Turnout		28,891	95.2	
Two-party-preferred result
Labor	Ernie Quinn	16,498	58.8	+3.7
Liberal	Richard Gregory	11,543	41.2	−3.7
Labor hold		Swing	+3.7	

=== Willoughby ===
1968 New South Wales state election: Willoughby
Party	Candidate	Votes	%	±%
Liberal	Laurie McGinty	16,638	65.7	−5.0
Labor	Eddie Britt	7,364	29.1	−0.2
Democratic Labor	Peter Ledlin	1,328	5.2	+5.2
Total formal votes		25,330	96.5	
Informal votes		928	3.5	
Turnout		26,258	93.7	
Two-party-preferred result
Liberal	Laurie McGinty	17,700	69.9	−0.9
Labor	Eddie Britt	7,630	30.1	+0.9
Liberal hold		Swing	−0.9	

=== Wollondilly ===
1968 New South Wales state election: Wollondilly
Party	Candidate	Votes	%	±%
Liberal	Tom Lewis	10,652	59.2	+0.4
Labor	Bernard Carroll	7,330	40.8	+5.1
Total formal votes		17,982	97.7	
Informal votes		425	2.3	
Turnout		18,407	95.3	
Liberal hold		Swing	−2.4	

=== Wollongong ===
1968 New South Wales state election: Wollongong
Party	Candidate	Votes	%	±%
Liberal	Jack Hough	8,694	42.7	
Labor	Eric Ramsay	7,977	39.2	
Independent	Anthony Bevan	3,345	16.4	
Independent	Walter Green	348	1.7	
Total formal votes		20,364	97.9	
Informal votes		446	2.1	
Turnout		20,810	94.8	
Two-party-preferred result
Liberal	Jack Hough	11,565	56.8	+1.1
Labor	Eric Ramsay	8,799	43.2	−1.1
Liberal win		(new seat)		

=== Wyong ===
1968 New South Wales state election: Wyong
Party	Candidate	Votes	%	±%
Labor	Harry Jensen	11,115	52.6	
Liberal	Frederick Vaughan	9,417	44.5	
Democratic Labor	Herbert Collins	619	2.9	
Total formal votes		21,151	98.4	
Informal votes		349	1.6	
Turnout		21,500	94.6	
Two-party-preferred result
Labor	Harry Jensen	11,239	53.1	+3.0
Liberal	Frederick Vaughan	9,912	46.9	−3.0
Labor hold		Swing	+3.0	

=== Yaralla ===
1968 New South Wales state election: Yaralla
Party	Candidate	Votes	%	±%
Liberal	Lerryn Mutton	12,355	50.6	
Labor	Thomas Murphy	10,671	43.7	
Democratic Labor	Maxwell Martin	1,381	5.7	
Total formal votes		24,407	97.1	
Informal votes		730	2.9	
Turnout		25,137	94.5	
Two-party-preferred result
Liberal	Lerryn Mutton	13,460	55.1	−1.0
Labor	Thomas Murphy	10,947	44.9	+1.0
Liberal win		(new seat)		

Yaralla was a new seat, largely replacing the abolished district of Concord. The member for Concord was Thomas Murphy (Labor).

=== Young ===
1968 New South Wales state election: Young
Party	Candidate	Votes	%	±%
Country	George Freudenstein	11,374	59.3	−3.2
Labor	Kevin Whalan	6,769	35.3	−2.2
Democratic Labor	James Manwaring	1,045	5.4	+5.4
Total formal votes		19,188	98.4	
Informal votes		305	1.6	
Turnout		19,493	95.6	
Two-party-preferred result
Country	George Freudenstein	12,210	63.6	+1.1
Labor	Kevin Whalan	6,978	36.4	−1.1
Country hold		Swing	+1.1	

== See also ==
- Candidates of the 1968 New South Wales state election
- Members of the New South Wales Legislative Assembly, 1968–1971
