= Candidates of the 1968 New South Wales state election =

This is a list of candidates of the 1968 New South Wales state election. The election was held on 24 February 1968.

== Retiring Members ==
Note: The Liberal MLA for Bligh, Morton Cohen, died shortly before the election. No by-election was held.

=== Labor ===
- Howard Fowles MLA (Illawarra)
- Fred Green MLA (Redfern)
- Frank Hawkins MLA (Newcastle)
- Bob Heffron MLA (Botany)
- Leo Nott MLA (Mudgee)
- Cliff Mallam MLA (Dulwich Hill)
- John McMahon MLA (Balmain)
- William Wattison MLA (Sturt)

=== Liberal ===
- George Brain MLA (Willoughby)

=== Country ===
- Richmond Manyweathers MLA (Casino)

== Legislative Assembly ==
Sitting members are shown in bold text. Successful candidates are highlighted in the relevant colour. Where there is possible confusion, an asterisk (*) is also used.

Electorate	Held by	Labor candidate	Coalition candidate	Other candidates
Albury	Liberal	Douglas McFarlane	**Gordon Mackie** (Lib)	Anthony Quinn (DLP)
Armidale	Country	Joseph Dawson	**Davis Hughes** (CP)	
Ashfield	Liberal	Charles Maddocks	**David Hunter** (Lib)	
Auburn	Labor	**Peter Cox**	Gregory Ricardo (Lib)	
Balmain	Labor	Roger Degen	Peter Middleton (Lib)	Nick Origlass (Ind)
Bankstown	Labor	**Nick Kearns**	John Ghent (Lib)	
Barwon	Country	Cecil Newton	**Geoff Crawford** (CP)	David Aiken (NSM)
Bass Hill	Labor	**Clarrie Earl**	Neil Davis (Lib)	
Bathurst	Country	Ken Fry	**Clive Osborne** (CP)	
Blacktown	Labor	**Jim Southee**	Ralph Stewart (Lib)	Kenneth Brown (DLP)
Bligh	Liberal	Thomas Morey	John Barraclough (Lib)	Henry Bader (DLP); Peter Clyne (Ind)
Blue Mountains	Independent	James Robson		**Harold Coates*** (Ind); David Westgate (DLP)
Bondi	Labor	**Syd Einfeld**	James Markham (Lib)	
Broken Hill	Labor	**Lew Johnstone**	Edward Brown (Lib)	
Bulli	Labor	**Rex Jackson**	Ronald White (Lib)	
Burrendong	Country	Paul Khoury	Dick Evans (Lib); Roger Wotton* (CP)	
Burrinjuck	Labor	**Bill Sheahan**	Douglas Boag (CP); Leon Garry (Lib)	Anthony Abbey (DLP)
Burwood	Liberal	Antony Kelly	**John Jackett** (Lib)	Ben Doig (Ind)
Byron	Country	James Constable	**Stanley Stephens** (CP)	
Campbelltown	Liberal	Francis Ward	Max Dunbier (Lib)	
Canterbury	Labor	**Kevin Stewart**	Stanley Squire (Lib)	Jack Mundey (CPA)
Castlereagh	Labor	**Jack Renshaw**	Allan Connell (Lib); Doug Moppett (CP)	
Cessnock	Labor	**George Neilly**		Robert Brown (Ind)
Clarence	Country		**Bill Weiley** (CP)	Garry Nehl (NSM)
Collaroy	Liberal	David Lawler	**Robert Askin** (Lib)	
Coogee	Liberal	Lou Walsh	**Kevin Ellis** (Lib)	John Cunningham (DLP); Lincoln Oppenheimer (Ind)
Cook's River	Labor	**Tom Cahill**	James Harris (Lib)	
Corrimal	Labor	Laurie Kelly	Donald Heggie (Lib)	Charles Birch (Ind); Mary Hargrave (Ind)
Cronulla	Liberal	John Cudmore	**Ian Griffith** (Lib)	Alexander Elphinston (CPA); Kevin Ryan (DLP)
Drummoyne	Liberal	**Reg Coady**	John Howard (Lib)	Mick Carroll (DLP)
Dubbo	Liberal	Robert Scarff	**John Mason** (Lib)	
Earlwood	Liberal	Cavell Becher	**Eric Willis** (Lib)	
East Hills	Labor	**Joe Kelly**	John Colley (Lib)	Harold McIlveen (Ind)
Eastwood	Liberal	George Keniry	**Jim Clough** (Lib)	
Fairfield	Labor	Eric Bedford	Frank Calabro (Lib)	
Fuller	Liberal	**Frank Downing**	Peter Coleman (Lib)	Mel Antcliff (DLP)
Georges River	Liberal	Ernest Curlisa	**Douglas Cross** (Lib)	
Gloucester	Country	Philip Jackson	**Leon Punch** (CP)	Charles Buckingham (Ind); Bob Scott (Ind); John Tully (Ind)
Gordon	Liberal	Norman Hanscombe	**Harry Jago** (Lib)	Dominique Droulers (DLP)
Gosford	Liberal	Peter Westerway	**Ted Humphries** (Lib)	Thomas Crass (DLP)
Goulburn	Country	John Longhurst	**Ron Brewer** (CP)	Kenneth Clancy (DLP)
Granville	Labor	**Pat Flaherty**	Stewart Allan (Lib)	
Hamilton	Labor	**Robert McCartney**	James Reeves (Lib)	
Hawkesbury	Liberal	Dick Klugman	**Bernie Deane** (Lib)	Leslie Clarke (DLP); William Murray (ARP); Rodney Rose (Ind)
Hornsby	Liberal	Kenneth Reid	**John Maddison** (Lib)	Anthony Felton (DLP)
Hurstville	Liberal	Bill Rigby	**Tom Mead** (Lib)	Kevin Davis (DLP)
Kahibah	Labor	**Jack Stewart**	Roy Hammond (Lib)	William Crane (DLP); Darrell Dawson (CPA); William Fricker (Ind)
Kembla	Labor	George Petersen	Jack Walker (Lib)	Teresa Gibbins (Ind); Thomas Malcolm (Ind); Melva Merletto (CPA)
King	Labor	**Albert Sloss**	Alfred Van Der Poorten (Lib)	Brian Crispin (CPA); Martyn Harper (Nat Dem)
Kirribilli	Liberal	Alan Newbury	**John Waddy** (Lib)	Luigi Lamprati (DLP)
Kogarah	Labor	**Bill Crabtree**	Albert Oakey (Lib)	Brian Harnett (DLP)
Lake Macquarie	Labor	**Jim Simpson**	Malcolm Blackshaw (Lib)	
Lakemba	Labor	**Vince Durick**	Malcolm Broun (Lib)	Annette Andrew (DLP); Frank Ball (Ind); Lancelot Hutchinson (Ind)
Lane Cove	Liberal	James Westerway	**Ken McCaw** (Lib)	Antony Liddle (DLP)
Lismore	Country	Barrie Eggins	**Bruce Duncan** (CP)	
Liverpool	Labor	**Jack Mannix**	Kenneth Laing (Lib)	Edward Connolly (DLP); Michael Tubbs (CPA)
Maitland	Liberal	George Lyons	**Milton Morris** (Lib)	Aubrey Barr (DLP)
Manly	Liberal	Daniel Dwyer	**Douglas Darby** (Lib)	Ann Macken (DLP); Eric Riches (Ind); Vincent Rizner (Ind)
Maroubra	Labor	Bill Haigh	Desmond Cahill (Lib)	
Marrickville	Labor	**Norm Ryan**	Jonathan Fowler (Lib)	
Merrylands	Labor	**Jack Ferguson**	Stanislaus Kelly (Lib)	
Monaro	Liberal	David Lowrey	**Steve Mauger** (Lib)	
Mosman	Liberal	Lipanjka Dezelin	**Pat Morton** (Lib)	Geoffrey Hicks (DLP)
Murray	Country	Henry O'Callaghan	Bruce Birrell (CP); Michael Butler (Lib); Donald Kendell (CP)	Victor Groutsch (DLP); **Joe Lawson*** (Ind)
Murrumbidgee	Country	**Al Grassby**	Eric Baldwin (CP); Verdon Letheren (Lib)	Leslie Kennedy (DLP)
Nepean	Liberal	Alfred Bennett	**Ron Dunbier** (Lib)	
Newcastle	Labor	Arthur Wade	Malcolm Barnes (Lib)	Douglas McDougall (Ind)
Northcott	Liberal	Pauline Unsworth	Jim Cameron (Lib)	John Kennedy (DLP)
Orange	Country	Reginald Cutcliffe	**Charles Cutler** (CP)	
Oxley	Country		**Bruce Cowan** (CP)	Joe Cordner (Ind)
Parramatta	Labor	**Dan Mahoney**	Hilton Robinson (Lib)	Leonard Kiernan (RTP); Wayne Merton (Ind); John Stewart (DLP)
Phillip	Labor	**Pat Hills**	Terence Tomlin (Lib)	Doris Brown (DLP)
Raleigh	Country	Robert Melville	**Jim Brown** (CP)	Aubrey Barker (NSM)
Randwick	Labor	**Lionel Bowen**	John McLaughlin (Lib)	Cornelius Woodbury (DLP)
Rockdale	Labor	**Brian Bannon**	Harold Heslehurst (Lib)	Peter Height (DLP)
South Coast	Liberal		**Jack Beale** (Lib)	John Hatton (Ind)
Sutherland	Liberal	**Tom Dalton**	Tim Walker (Lib)	William Goslett (DLP)
Tamworth	Country		**Bill Chaffey** (CP)	Stanley Cole (Ind); Alexander Dickinson (NSM)
Temora	Country	John O'Hara	**Jim Taylor** (CP)	Garry Carroll (DLP); Dorothy Frank (Ind)
Tenterfield	Country	Ronald Grafton	**Tim Bruxner** (CP)	
The Hills	Liberal	Eli Hirsch	**Max Ruddock** (Lib)	Michael Fagan (DLP); Keith Phillis (Ind)
Upper Hunter	Country	Leo Musgrave	**Frank O'Keefe** (CP)	
Vaucluse	Liberal	William Ross	**Keith Doyle** (Lib)	Hugh Bartlett (DLP)
Wagga Wagga	Liberal	John Skeers	**Wal Fife** (Lib)	Peter Piltz (DLP)
Wakehurst	Liberal	Dorothy Isaksen	**Dick Healey** (Lib)	Lyle Antcliff (DLP)
Wallsend	Labor	**Ken Booth**	William Gilchrist (Lib)	Donald Richards (DLP)
Waratah	Labor	**Sam Jones**		Frank Purdue (Ind)
Wentworthville	Labor	**Ernie Quinn**	Richard Gregory (Lib)	Albert Hall (RTP)
Willoughby	Liberal	Eddie Britt	Laurie McGinty (Lib)	Peter Ledlin (DLP)
Wollondilly	Labor	Bernard Carroll	**Tom Lewis** (Lib)	
Wollongong	Liberal	Eric Ramsay	**Jack Hough** (Lib)	Anthony Bevan (Ind); Walter Green (Ind)
Wyong	Labor	**Harry Jensen**	Frederick Vaughan (Lib)	Jack Collins (DLP)
Yaralla	Liberal	**Thomas Murphy**	Lerryn Mutton (Lib)	Maxwell Martin (DLP)
Young	Country	Kevin Whalan	**George Freudenstein** (CP)	James Manwaring (DLP)

== See also ==
- Members of the New South Wales Legislative Assembly, 1968–1971
