= Electoral results for the district of Lake Macquarie =

Election results for Lake Macquarie, New South Wales, Australia

Lake Macquarie, an electoral district of the Legislative Assembly in the Australian state of New South Wales, has had one incarnation, from 1950 until the present.

== Members for Lake Macquarie ==
Election	Member	Party
1950	Jim Simpson	Labor
1953	Jim Simpson	Labor
1956	Jim Simpson	Labor
1959	Jim Simpson	Labor
1962	Jim Simpson	Labor
1965	Jim Simpson	Labor
1968	Jim Simpson	Labor
1969 by	Merv Hunter	Labor
1971	Merv Hunter	Labor
1973	Merv Hunter	Labor
1976	Merv Hunter	Labor
1978	Merv Hunter	Labor
1981	Merv Hunter	Labor
1984	Merv Hunter	Labor
1988	Merv Hunter	Labor
1991	Jeff Hunter	Labor
1995	Jeff Hunter	Labor
1999	Jeff Hunter	Labor
2003	Jeff Hunter	Labor
2007	Greg Piper	Independent
2011	Greg Piper	Independent
2015	Greg Piper	Independent
2019	Greg Piper	Independent
2023	Greg Piper	Independent

== Election results ==
=== Elections in the 2020s ===
==== 2023 ====
2023 New South Wales state election: Lake Macquarie
Party	Candidate	Votes	%	±%
Independent	Greg Piper	29,093	57.5	+3.0
Labor	Steve Ryan	10,031	19.8	−0.8
Liberal	Joshua Beer	5,091	10.1	−5.5
Shooters, Fishers, Farmers	Jason Lesage	3,203	6.3	+6.3
Greens	Kim Grierson	2,430	4.8	−0.1
Sustainable Australia	Felipe Gore-Escalante	761	1.5	0.0
Total formal votes		50,609	97.3	+0.8
Informal votes		1,386	2.7	−0.8
Turnout		51,995	88.1	−0.1
Notional two-party-preferred count
Labor	Steve Ryan	16,981	62.8	+6.3
Liberal	Joshua Beer	10,069	37.2	−6.3
Two-candidate-preferred result
Independent	Greg Piper	32,905	74.1	+0.9
Labor	Steve Ryan	11,492	25.9	−0.9
Independent hold		Swing	+0.9	

=== Elections in the 2010s ===
==== 2019 ====
2019 New South Wales state election: Lake Macquarie
Party	Candidate	Votes	%	±%
Independent	Greg Piper	26,811	53.53	+11.08
Labor	Jo Smith	10,735	21.43	−9.23
Liberal	Lindsay Paterson	7,742	15.46	−1.33
Greens	Kim Grierson	2,517	5.03	+0.07
Animal Justice	Laurance Taranto	1,481	2.96	+0.56
Sustainable Australia	Marie Rolfe	796	1.59	+1.59
Total formal votes		50,082	96.48	−0.28
Informal votes		1,827	3.52	+0.28
Turnout		51,909	89.99	−1.00
Two-party-preferred result
Labor	Jo Smith	16,390	57.37	−5.79
Liberal	Lindsay Paterson	12,180	42.63	+5.79
Two-candidate-preferred result
Independent	Greg Piper	31,164	72.11	+11.42
Labor	Jo Smith	12,053	27.89	−11.42
Independent hold		Swing	+11.42	

==== 2015 ====
2015 New South Wales state election: Lake Macquarie
Party	Candidate	Votes	%	±%
Independent	Greg Piper	20,251	42.5	+1.1
Labor	Melissa Cleary	14,625	30.7	+10.2
Liberal	Daniel Collard	8,007	16.8	−10.6
Greens	Ivan Macfadyen	2,363	5.0	−1.7
Animal Justice	Susan Strain	1,143	2.4	+2.4
Christian Democrats	Kim Gritten	898	1.9	−0.9
No Land Tax	Andrew Coroneo	412	0.9	+0.9
Total formal votes		47,699	96.8	+0.4
Informal votes		1,596	3.2	−0.4
Turnout		49,295	91.0	−1.4
Notional two-party-preferred count
Labor	Melissa Cleary	19,309	63.2	+20.6
Liberal	Daniel Collard	11,262	36.8	−20.6
Two-candidate-preferred result
Independent	Greg Piper	24,152	60.7	−3.9
Labor	Melissa Cleary	15,646	39.3	+39.3
Independent hold		Swing	−3.9	

==== 2011 ====
2011 New South Wales state election: Lake Macquarie
Party	Candidate	Votes	%	±%
Independent	Greg Piper	19,678	43.7	+13.4
Liberal	John McDonald	12,644	28.1	+8.6
Labor	Marcus Mariani	8,385	18.6	−21.9
Greens	Charmian Eckersley	3,094	6.9	+1.1
Christian Democrats	Kim Gritten	1,269	2.8	+0.7
Total formal votes		45,070	97.0	−0.7
Informal votes		1,392	3.0	+0.7
Turnout		46,462	93.4	
Notional two-party-preferred count
Liberal	John McDonald	18,147	59.4	+24.4
Labor	Marcus Mariani	12,414	40.6	−24.4
Two-candidate-preferred result
Independent	Greg Piper	25,356	64.9	+14.7
Liberal	John McDonald	13,733	35.1	+35.1
Independent hold		Swing	+14.7	

=== Elections in the 2000s ===
==== 2007 ====
2007 New South Wales state election: Lake Macquarie
Party	Candidate	Votes	%	±%
Labor	Jeff Hunter	17,290	40.5	−11.7
Independent	Greg Piper	12,917	30.3	+30.3
Liberal	Ken Paxinos	8,310	19.5	−13.7
Greens	Suzanne Pritchard	2,441	5.7	−2.5
Christian Democrats	Rex Morgan	921	2.2	+1.9
AAFI	Leonard Hodge	770	1.8	−1.0
Total formal votes		42,649	97.7	+0.1
Informal votes		1,005	2.3	−0.1
Turnout		43,654	93.1	
Notional two-party-preferred count
Labor	Jeff Hunter	20,954	65.0	+3.4
Liberal	Ken Paxinos	11,292	35.0	−3.4
Two-candidate-preferred result
Independent	Greg Piper	18,654	50.1	+50.1
Labor	Jeff Hunter	18,548	49.9	−11.7
Independent gain from Labor		Swing	+11.7	

==== 2003 ====
2003 New South Wales state election: Lake Macquarie
Party	Candidate	Votes	%	±%
Labor	Jeff Hunter	23,520	54.9	+0.1
Liberal	Michael Chamberlain	13,138	30.7	+8.3
Greens	Howard Morrison	3,539	8.3	+3.2
AAFI	Leonard Hodge	1,329	3.1	+0.9
One Nation	Trevor Gander	1,298	3.0	−9.2
Total formal votes		42,824	97.5	−0.4
Informal votes		1,114	2.5	+0.4
Turnout		43,938	93.5	
Two-party-preferred result
Labor	Jeff Hunter	25,427	64.5	−4.7
Liberal	Michael Chamberlain	14,016	35.5	+4.7
Labor hold		Swing	−4.7	

=== Elections in the 1990s ===
==== 1999 ====
1999 New South Wales state election: Lake Macquarie
Party	Candidate	Votes	%	±%
Labor	Jeff Hunter	22,821	54.8	−6.1
Liberal	Don Payne	9,333	22.4	−8.8
One Nation	Robert Johnson	5,073	12.2	+12.2
Greens	David Blyth	2,130	5.1	+5.1
Christian Democrats	Ros Gourlay	1,370	3.3	+3.3
AAFI	Bob Boulton	912	2.2	+2.2
Total formal votes		41,639	97.9	+3.3
Informal votes		898	2.1	−3.3
Turnout		42,537	94.4	
Two-party-preferred result
Labor	Jeff Hunter	25,065	69.2	+4.1
Liberal	Don Payne	11,134	30.8	−4.1
Labor hold		Swing	+4.1	

==== 1995 ====
1995 New South Wales state election: Lake Macquarie
Party	Candidate	Votes	%	±%
Labor	Jeff Hunter	20,723	60.1	+6.7
Liberal	Laurie Brewster	10,756	31.2	+3.3
Democrats	Lyn Godfrey	3,020	8.8	+1.9
Total formal votes		34,499	94.9	+3.2
Informal votes		1,865	5.1	−3.2
Turnout		36,364	94.6	
Two-party-preferred result
Labor	Jeff Hunter	21,864	64.8	+2.1
Liberal	Laurie Brewster	11,877	35.2	−2.1
Labor hold		Swing	+2.1	

==== 1991 ====
1991 New South Wales state election: Lake Macquarie
Party	Candidate	Votes	%	±%
Labor	Jeff Hunter	16,726	53.3	+11.4
Liberal	Cameron Phillips	8,738	27.9	+3.5
Independent	Alan Davis	2,878	9.2	+9.2
Democrats	Lyla Koelink	2,154	6.9	+6.9
Call to Australia	Margaret Neale	874	2.8	+2.8
Total formal votes		31,370	91.6	−5.8
Informal votes		2,865	8.4	+5.8
Turnout		34,235	94.0	
Two-party-preferred result
Labor	Jeff Hunter	18,483	62.7	+5.9
Liberal	Cameron Phillips	10,980	37.3	−5.9
Labor hold		Swing	+5.9	

=== Elections in the 1980s ===
==== 1988 ====
1988 New South Wales state election: Lake Macquarie
Party	Candidate	Votes	%	±%
Labor	Merv Hunter	12,260	40.4	−21.2
Liberal	Val Samuels	7,131	23.5	−6.9
Independent	Bill Jones	6,306	20.8	+20.8
Independent	Walt Edwards	3,169	10.4	+10.4
Independent	Ron Fennell	1,510	5.0	+5.0
Total formal votes		30,376	97.5	−0.4
Informal votes		777	2.5	+0.4
Turnout		31,153	94.7	
Two-party-preferred result
Labor	Merv Hunter	15,089	56.4	−9.3
Liberal	Val Samuels	11,648	43.6	+9.3
Labor hold		Swing	−9.3	

==== 1984 ====
1984 New South Wales state election: Lake Macquarie
Party	Candidate	Votes	%	±%
Labor	Merv Hunter	20,145	57.8	−8.7
Liberal	Edward Hayes	11,694	33.5	+9.3
Democrats	Edwina Wilson	3,025	8.7	−0.6
Total formal votes		34,864	97.9	+0.2
Informal votes		761	2.1	−0.2
Turnout		35,625	93.6	+0.7
Two-party-preferred result
Labor	Merv Hunter		62.2	−9.5
Liberal	Edward Hayes		37.8	+9.5
Labor hold		Swing	−9.5	

==== 1981 ====
1981 New South Wales state election: Lake Macquarie
Party	Candidate	Votes	%	±%
Labor	Merv Hunter	21,165	66.5	−4.7
Liberal	Judith Ball	7,716	24.2	−0.1
Democrats	Genady Levitch	2,968	9.3	+4.8
Total formal votes		31,849	97.7	
Informal votes		734	2.3	
Turnout		32,583	92.9	
Two-party-preferred result
Labor	Merv Hunter	22,134	71.7	−1.8
Liberal	Judith Ball	8,747	28.3	+1.8
Labor hold		Swing	−1.8	

=== Elections in the 1970s ===
==== 1978 ====
1978 New South Wales state election: Lake Macquarie
Party	Candidate	Votes	%	±%
Labor	Merv Hunter	22,403	71.2	+6.8
Liberal	Oliver Fennell	7,633	24.3	−11.3
Democrats	Lyn Godfrey	1,424	4.5	+4.5
Total formal votes		31,460	98.0	−0.5
Informal votes		627	2.0	+0.5
Turnout		32,087	93.7	−0.7
Two-party-preferred result
Labor	Merv Hunter	23,115	73.5	+9.1
Liberal	Oliver Fennell	8,345	26.5	−9.1
Labor hold		Swing	+9.1	

==== 1976 ====
1976 New South Wales state election: Lake Macquarie
Party	Candidate	Votes	%	±%
Labor	Merv Hunter	19,022	64.4	−1.6
Liberal	Oliver Fennell	10,521	35.6	+35.6
Total formal votes		29,543	98.5	+1.1
Informal votes		449	1.5	−1.1
Turnout		29,992	94.4	+0.6
Labor hold		Swing	−8.9	

==== 1973 ====
1973 New South Wales state election: Lake Macquarie
Party	Candidate	Votes	%	±%
Labor	Merv Hunter	17,355	66.0	+1.1
Independent	Colin Fisher	5,102	19.4	+19.4
Democratic Labor	Donald Richards	3,851	14.6	+14.6
Total formal votes		26,308	97.4	
Informal votes		701	2.6	
Turnout		27,009	93.8	
Two-candidate-preferred result
Labor	Merv Hunter	19,281	73.2	+8.3
Independent	Colin Fisher	7,027	26.8	+26.8
Labor hold		Swing	+8.3	

==== 1971 ====
1971 New South Wales state election: Lake Macquarie
Party	Candidate	Votes	%	±%
Labor	Merv Hunter	17,754	64.9	+0.5
Liberal	Richard Bevan	9,589	35.1	−0.5
Total formal votes		27,343	98.4	
Informal votes		438	1.6	
Turnout		27,781	95.4	
Labor hold		Swing	+0.5	

=== Elections in the 1960s ===
==== 1969 by-election ====
1969 Lake Macquarie by-election Saturday 14 February
Party	Candidate	Votes	%	±%
Labor	Merv Hunter	13,252	64.1	−0.4
Liberal	Edwin Chiplin	6,071	29.3	−6.3
Independent	Thomas Pendlebury	1,072	5.2	
Independent	Colin Fisher	296	1.4	
Total formal votes		20,691	98.4	+0.7
Informal votes		335	1.6	−0.7
Turnout		21,026	89.0	−5.4
Labor hold		Swing		

Jim Simpson (Labor) died.

==== 1968 ====
1968 New South Wales state election: Lake Macquarie
Party	Candidate	Votes	%	±%
Labor	Jim Simpson	13,608	64.4	−7.9
Liberal	Malcolm Blackshaw	7,517	35.6	+7.9
Total formal votes		21,125	97.7	
Informal votes		496	2.3	
Turnout		21,621	94.4	
Labor hold		Swing	−7.9	

==== 1965 ====
1968 New South Wales state election: Lake Macquarie
Party	Candidate	Votes	%	±%
Labor	Jim Simpson	16,495	72.3	−3.3
Liberal	John Wassell	6,306	27.7	+3.3
Total formal votes		22,801	98.2	−0.2
Informal votes		418	1.8	+0.2
Turnout		23,219	94.7	+0.3
Labor hold		Swing	−3.3	

==== 1962 ====
1962 New South Wales state election: Lake Macquarie
Party	Candidate	Votes	%	±%
Labor	Jim Simpson	15,316	75.6	−13.1
Liberal	Reuben Hull	4,941	24.4	+24.4
Total formal votes		20,257	98.4	
Informal votes		320	1.6	
Turnout		20,577	94.4	
Labor hold		Swing	N/A	

=== Elections in the 1950s ===
==== 1959 ====
1959 New South Wales state election: Lake Macquarie
Party	Candidate	Votes	%	±%
Labor	Jim Simpson	15,303	88.7	
Communist	John Tapp	1,942	11.3	
Total formal votes		17,245	95.4	
Informal votes		836	4.6	
Turnout		18,081	94.8	
Labor hold		Swing		

==== 1956 ====
1956 New South Wales state election: Lake Macquarie
Party	Candidate	Votes	%	±%
Labor	Jim Simpson	14,321	69.2	−30.8
Liberal	Edward Farrell	4,756	23.0	+23.0
Communist	William Quinn	1,619	7.8	+7.8
Total formal votes		20,696	98.5	
Informal votes		311	1.5	
Turnout		21,007	95.3	
Two-party-preferred result
Labor	Jim Simpson	15,382	74.8	−25.2
Liberal	Edward Farrell	5,314	25.2	+25.2
Labor hold		Swing	N/A	

==== 1953 ====
1953 New South Wales state election: Lake Macquarie
Party	Candidate	Votes	%	±%
Labor	Jim Simpson	unopposed		
Labor hold				

==== 1950 ====
1950 New South Wales state election: Lake Macquarie
Party	Candidate	Votes	%	±%
Labor	Jim Simpson	12,805	71.3	
Liberal	John Wilkins	5,154	28.7	
Total formal votes		17,959	97.9	
Informal votes		377	2.1	
Turnout		18,336	93.6	
Labor notional hold				
