= Electoral results for the district of Yaralla =

Election result for Yaralla, New South Wales, Australia

Yaralla, an electoral district of the Legislative Assembly in the Australian state of New South Wales was created in 1968 and abolished in 1981.

Election	Member	Party
1968	Lerryn Mutton	Liberal
1971	Lerryn Mutton	Liberal
1973	Lerryn Mutton	Liberal
1976	Lerryn Mutton	Liberal
1978	Garry McIlwaine	Labor

== Election results ==
=== Elections in the 1970s ===
==== 1978 ====
1978 New South Wales state election: Yaralla
Party	Candidate	Votes	%	±%
Labor	Garry McIlwaine	16,219	56.5	+10.9
Liberal	Lerryn Mutton	11,533	40.1	−14.3
Democrats	Christopher Dunkerley	973	3.4	+3.4
Total formal votes		28,725	97.6	−0.2
Informal votes		697	2.4	+0.2
Turnout		29,422	92.5	+1.1
Two-party-preferred result
Labor	Garry McIlwaine	16,706	58.2	+12.6
Liberal	Lerryn Mutton	12,019	41.8	−12.6
Labor gain from Liberal		Swing	+12.6	

==== 1976 ====
1976 New South Wales state election: Yaralla
Party	Candidate	Votes	%	±%
Liberal	Lerryn Mutton	15,761	54.4	+0.6
Labor	Derek Margerison	13,218	45.6	+7.0
Total formal votes		28,979	97.8	+0.1
Informal votes		662	2.2	−0.1
Turnout		29,641	91.4	+0.3
Liberal hold		Swing	−5.4	

==== 1973 ====
1973 New South Wales state election: Yaralla
Party	Candidate	Votes	%	±%
Liberal	Lerryn Mutton	14,924	53.8	+3.0
Labor	Derek Margerison	10,703	38.6	−3.5
Democratic Labor	Terence McCormack	2,107	7.6	+0.5
Total formal votes		27,734	97.7	
Informal votes		652	2.3	
Turnout		28,386	91.1	
Two-party-preferred result
Liberal	Lerryn Mutton	16,590	59.8	+3.6
Labor	Derek Margerison	11,144	40.2	−3.6
Liberal hold		Swing	+3.6	

==== 1971 ====
1971 New South Wales state election: Yaralla
Party	Candidate	Votes	%	±%
Liberal	Lerryn Mutton	13,295	49.8	−1.8
Labor	Garry McIlwaine	11,500	43.1	+0.4
Democratic Labor	Andrew Murphy	1,889	7.1	+1.4
Total formal votes		26,684	98.1	
Informal votes		511	1.9	
Turnout		27,195	93.0	
Two-party-preferred result
Liberal	Lerryn Mutton	14,661	54.9	−2.3
Labor	Garry McIlwaine	12,023	45.1	+2.3
Liberal hold		Swing	−2.3	

=== Elections in the 1960s ===
==== 1968 ====
1968 New South Wales state election: Yaralla
Party	Candidate	Votes	%	±%
Liberal	Lerryn Mutton	12,355	50.6	
Labor	Thomas Murphy	10,671	43.7	
Democratic Labor	Maxwell Martin	1,381	5.7	
Total formal votes		24,407	97.1	
Informal votes		730	2.9	
Turnout		25,137	94.5	
Two-party-preferred result
Liberal	Lerryn Mutton	13,460	55.1	−1.0
Labor	Thomas Murphy	10,947	44.9	+1.0
Liberal win		(new seat)		

Yaralla was a new seat, largely replacing the abolished district of Concord. The member for Concord was Thomas Murphy (Labor).
