= Electoral results for the district of Corrimal =

Election results for Corrimal, New South Wales, Australia

Corrimal, an electoral district of the Legislative Assembly in the Australian state of New South Wales was created in 1968 and abolished in 1988.

| Election | Member | Party |
|---|---|---|
| 1968 | Laurie Kelly | Labor |
| 1971 | Laurie Kelly | Labor |
| 1973 | Laurie Kelly | Labor |
| 1976 | Laurie Kelly | Labor |
| 1978 | Laurie Kelly | Labor |
| 1981 | Laurie Kelly | Labor |
| 1984 | Laurie Kelly | Labor |

== Election results ==
=== Elections in the 1980s ===
==== 1984 ====
1984 New South Wales state election: Corrimal
| Party | Candidate | Votes | % | ±% |
|---|---|---|---|---|
| Labor | Laurie Kelly | 21,068 | 68.9 | −1.1 |
| Liberal | Colin Bruton | 9,527 | 31.1 | +9.0 |
| Total formal votes | | 30,595 | 97.2 | +0.4 |
| Informal votes | | 874 | 2.8 | −0.4 |
| Turnout | | 31,469 | 94.0 | +0.9 |
| Labor hold | | Swing | −6.8 | |

==== 1981 ====
1981 New South Wales state election: Corrimal
| Party | Candidate | Votes | % | ±% |
|---|---|---|---|---|
| Labor | Laurie Kelly | 20,874 | 70.0 | +2.2 |
| Liberal | Colin Bruton | 6,574 | 22.1 | −3.1 |
| Democrats | Questa Gill | 1,725 | 5.8 | −1.2 |
| Independent | Carol Blond | 629 | 2.1 | +2.1 |
| Total formal votes | | 29,802 | 96.8 | |
| Informal votes | | 969 | 3.2 | |
| Turnout | | 30,771 | 93.1 | |
Two-party-preferred result
| Labor | Laurie Kelly | 21,074 | 75.7 | +3.2 |
| Liberal | Colin Bruton | 6,774 | 24.3 | −3.2 |
| Labor hold | | Swing | +3.2 | |

=== Elections in the 1970s ===
==== 1978 ====
1978 New South Wales state election: Corrimal
| Party | Candidate | Votes | % | ±% |
|---|---|---|---|---|
| Labor | Laurie Kelly | 20,694 | 67.8 | +4.7 |
| Liberal | Peter Atkins | 7,682 | 25.2 | −11.7 |
| Democrats | Leslie Scott | 2,129 | 7.0 | +7.0 |
| Total formal votes | | 30,505 | 97.7 | +0.1 |
| Informal votes | | 709 | 2.3 | −0.1 |
| Turnout | | 31,214 | 94.3 | −0.2 |
Two-party-preferred result
| Labor | Laurie Kelly | 22,113 | 72.5 | +9.4 |
| Liberal | Peter Atkins | 8,392 | 27.5 | −9.4 |
| Labor hold | | Swing | +9.4 | |

==== 1976 ====
1976 New South Wales state election: Corrimal
| Party | Candidate | Votes | % | ±% |
|---|---|---|---|---|
| Labor | Laurie Kelly | 18,701 | 63.1 | +5.0 |
| Liberal | Peter Atkins | 10,929 | 36.9 | +8.5 |
| Total formal votes | | 29,630 | 97.6 | +0.4 |
| Informal votes | | 715 | 2.4 | −0.4 |
| Turnout | | 30,345 | 94.5 | +1.7 |
| Labor hold | | Swing | −1.7 | |

==== 1973 ====
1973 New South Wales state election: Corrimal
| Party | Candidate | Votes | % | ±% |
|---|---|---|---|---|
| Labor | Laurie Kelly | 15,985 | 58.1 | |
| Liberal | Robert Law | 7,822 | 28.4 | |
| Australia | Susan Healy | 2,387 | 8.7 | |
| Democratic Labor | Peter Daly | 1,304 | 4.7 | |
| Total formal votes | | 27,498 | 97.2 | |
| Informal votes | | 796 | 2.8 | |
| Turnout | | 28,294 | 92.8 | |
Two-party-preferred result
| Labor | Laurie Kelly | 17,806 | 64.8 | +1.5 |
| Liberal | Robert Law | 9,691 | 35.2 | −1.5 |
| Labor hold | | Swing | +1.5 | |

==== 1971 ====
1971 New South Wales state election: Corrimal
| Party | Candidate | Votes | % | ±% |
|---|---|---|---|---|
| Labor | Laurie Kelly | 18,311 | 67.5 | +13.4 |
| Liberal | Eric Blain | 6,920 | 25.5 | −2.9 |
| Democratic Labor | Raymond Proust | 1,386 | 5.1 | +5.1 |
| Communist | Reginald Wilding | 511 | 1.9 | +1.9 |
| Total formal votes | | 27,128 | 97.7 | |
| Informal votes | | 645 | 2.3 | |
| Turnout | | 27,773 | 95.4 | |
Two-party-preferred result
| Labor | Laurie Kelly | 18,997 | 70.0 | +5.9 |
| Liberal | Eric Blain | 8,131 | 30.0 | −5.9 |
| Labor hold | | Swing | +5.9 | |

=== Elections in the 1960s ===
==== 1968 ====
1968 New South Wales state election: Corrimal
| Party | Candidate | Votes | % | ±% |
|---|---|---|---|---|
| Labor | Laurie Kelly | 10,125 | 54.1 | |
| Liberal | Donald Heggie | 5,321 | 28.4 | |
| Independent | Charles Birch | 2,604 | 13.9 | |
| Independent | Mary Hargrave | 671 | 3.6 | |
| Total formal votes | | 18,721 | 96.8 | |
| Informal votes | | 621 | 3.2 | |
| Turnout | | 19,342 | 95.6 | |
Two-party-preferred result
| Labor | Laurie Kelly | 12,003 | 64.1 | +4.4 |
| Liberal | Donald Heggie | 6,718 | 35.9 | −4.4 |
| Labor win | | (new seat) | | |
