= 1969 Lake Macquarie state by-election =

Election result for Lake Macquarie, New South Wales, Australia

A by-election was held for the New South Wales Legislative Assembly seat of Lake Macquarie on 19 April 1969. It was triggered by the death of Jim Simpson (Labor).

== Dates ==
Date	Event
10 December 1968	Death of Jim Simpson.
10 March 1969	Writ of election issued by the Speaker of the Legislative Assembly.
24 March 1969	Day of nomination
19 April 1969	Polling day
2 May 1969	Return of writ

== Results ==
1969 Lake Macquarie by-election Saturday 14 February
Party	Candidate	Votes	%	±%
Labor	Merv Hunter	13,252	64.1	−0.4
Liberal	Edwin Chiplin	6,071	29.3	−6.3
Independent	Thomas Pendlebury	1,072	5.2	
Independent	Colin Fisher	296	1.4	
Total formal votes		20,691	98.4	+0.7
Informal votes		335	1.6	−0.7
Turnout		21,026	89.0	−5.4
Labor hold		Swing		

== See also ==
- Electoral results for the district of Lake Macquarie
- List of New South Wales state by-elections
