= 1968 New South Wales state election =

State election for New South Wales, Australia in February 1968

- 24 February 1968

All 94 seats in the New South Wales Legislative Assembly 48 Assembly seats were needed for a majority
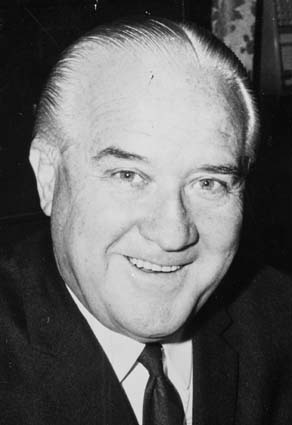

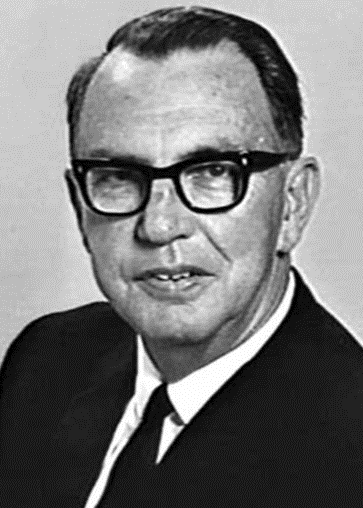
	First party	Second party
Leader	Robert Askin	Jack Renshaw
Party	Liberal–Country Coalition	Labor
Leader since	17 July 1959	30 April 1964
Leader's seat	Collaroy	Castlereagh
Last election	47 seats	45 seats
Seats won	53	39
Seat change	▲6	▼6
Percentage	49.09%	43.10%
Swing	▼0.73	▼0.21
- Two-candidate-preferred margin by electorate
Premier before election
Bob Askin
Liberal–Country Coalition
Elected Premier
Bob Askin
Liberal–Country Coalition

The 1968 New South Wales state election was held on 24 February 1968. It was conducted in single member constituencies with compulsory preferential voting and was held on boundaries created at a 1966 redistribution. The election was for all of the 94 seats in the Legislative Assembly. The Liberal Party, led by Premier Robert Askin, in Coalition with the Country Party of Deputy Premier Charles Cutler, was elected for a second term—the first time that a non-Labor government had been reelected since before World War II.

== Redistribution ==
An extensive redistribution of electoral boundaries was undertaken in 1966 by a commission consisting of Judge Amsberg of the District Court, the Surveyor-General, G Prince and the Electoral Commissioner J McDonald. Following instructions from the government of Robin Askin, the redistribution gave an increased weighting to the votes of electors in rural New South Wales . Of the 94 electorates, 48 were to be classified as "urban" with an average enrollment of 27,531 and 46 were "country" with an average enrollment of 20,882. However, a continuing movement of population from rural to urban NSW meant that many of the "country" seats were effectively situated in the outskirts of Sydney, where the Liberal Party traditionally had strong electoral support. Four seats (Casino, Cobar, Dulwich Hill and Redfern) were abolished and four new seats (Campbelltown, Corrimal, Merrylands and Northcott) were created . A further 9 seats, Ashfield-Croydon ( renamed Ashfield), Concord (Yaralla), Hartley (Blue Mountains), Illawarra (Kembla), Kurri Kurri (Wallsend), Mudgee (Burrendong), Ryde (Fuller), Sturt (Broken Hill) and Wollongong-Kembla (Wollongong), were extensively changed and renamed. The notional net result of the redistribution was to reduce the Labor Party's representation by at least 5 and possibly 9 seats and to reduce the Country Party by 1. The redistribution was unsuccessfully opposed by the Labor Party with parliamentary walkouts, legal appeals and public rallies.

== Issues ==
At the beginning of 1968, the Liberal–Country Coalition was widely regarded as a competent, non-controversial first-term government. With the aid of a favourable redistribution, it seemed certain of electoral victory; and as a result the campaign failed to generate significant public interest. Since 1965 the government had resolved the problem of cost over-runs and building delays at the Sydney Opera House by forcing the resignation of the architect, Jørn Utzon. Although in retrospect this move was widely censured, at the time it occurred it was generally well received by the public. New government policies during the campaign included an increase in state aid for private schools, increased spending on hospitals and a consumer affairs agency to monitor prices.

In contrast to the coalition, Labor's leader and former Premier, Jack Renshaw, was unable to appeal much to urban voters and had a hard time adjusting to television. He possessed also the disadvantage of having led to defeat in 1965 an ALP administration widely seen as tired and unfocused. Labor's campaign promises included four weeks of annual leave for all employees on state controlled award wages, the restoration of the Sydney City Council, price controls for basic food items and state control of Credit Unions. Renshaw was unable to match the government's promises of aid for private schools, which was a difficult ideological question for Labor.

== Results ==
Prior to the election the Country Party had gained the seats of Bathurst from the Labor Party and Oxley from the Liberal Party at by-elections caused by the deaths of sitting members. There was a slight swing to the Labor Party in the two party preferred vote at the election. However, the effects of the redistribution resulted in a significant improvement in the position of the coalition government and changes in seats at the election reflected the effects of the re-distribution rather than a swing in voter sentiment. The government had a buffer of 6 seats in the new parliament:

- Liberal 36 seats
- Country Party 17 seats
- Australian Labor Party 39 seats
- Independent 2 seats

The DLP contested 42 seats but achieved less than 3% of the statewide vote while the Communist party was reduced to 6 candidates who received negligible support. The New State Movement, which had suffered a devastating defeat at a plebiscite on the formation of a new state in New England in 1967, contested 4 seats and gained 0.80% of the total vote but up to 35% in individual seats.

The election marked the first time that a non-Labor government in New South Wales had been reelected since the Coalition won three consecutive elections from 1932 to 1938.

== Seats changing party representation ==
This table lists changes in party representation since the 1965 election

Seat	Incumbent member	Party	New member	Party
Ashfield	New seat		David Hunter	Liberal
Ashfield-Croydon	David Hunter	Liberal	Abolished Seat	
Bathurst	†	Labor	Clive Osborne	Country
Blue Mountains	New seat		Harold Coates	Independent
Broken Hill	New seat		Lew Johnstone	Labor
Burrendong	New seat		Roger Wotton	Country
Campbelltown	New seat		Max Dunbier	Liberal
Casino	Richmond Manyweathers	Country	Abolished Seat	
Cobar	Lew Johnstone	Labor	Abolished Seat	
Concord	Thomas Murphy	Labor	Abolished seat	
Corrimal	New seat		Laurie Kelly	Labor
Dulwich Hill	Cliff Mallam	Labor	Abolished seat	
Fuller	New seat		Peter Coleman	Liberal
Hartley	Harold Coates	Independent	Abolished seat	
Illawarra	Howard Fowles	Labor	Abolished Seat	
Kembla	New seat		George Petersen	Labor
Kurri Kurri	Ken Booth	Labor	Abolished seat	
Manly	Douglas Darby	Independent Liberal	Douglas Darby	Liberal
Merrylands	New seat		Jack Ferguson	Labor
Mudgee	Leo Nott	Labor	Abolished seat	
Murray	Joe Lawson	Country	Joe Lawson	Independent
Northcott	New seat		Jim Cameron	Liberal
Oxley	‡	Liberal	Bruce Cowan	Country
Redfern	Fred Green	Labor	Abolished seat	
Ryde	Frank Downing	Labor	Abolished seat	
Sturt	William Wattison	Labor	Abolished seat	
Sutherland	Tom Dalton	Labor	Tim Walker	Liberal
Wallsend	New seat		Ken Booth	Labor
Wollongong	New seat		Jack Hough	Liberal
Wollongong-Kembla	Jack Hough	Liberal	Abolished seat	
Yaralla	New seat		Lerryn Mutton	Liberal

† Bathurst was won by the Country Party at a 1967 by-election caused by the death of Labor's Gus Kelly

‡Oxley was won by the Country Party at a 1965 by-election caused by the death of the Liberal Party's Les Jordan

== Key dates ==
Date	Event
23 January 1968	The Legislative Assembly was dissolved, and writs were issued by the Governor to proceed with an election.
31 January 1968	Nominations for candidates for the election closed at noon.
24 February 1968	Polling day.
22 March 1968	Last day for the writs to be returned and the results formally declared.
26 March 1968	Opening of 42nd Parliament.

== Results ==
New South Wales state election, 24 February 1968 Legislative Assembly << 1965–1971 >>
Enrolled voters	2,356,977				
Votes cast	2,219,979		Turnout	94.19	+0.28
Informal votes	58,409		Informal	2.63	+0.59
Summary of votes by party
Party	Primary votes	%	Swing	Seats	Change
Liberal	831,514	38.47	−1.12	36	+5
Country	229,656	10.62	+0.39	17	+1
Labor	931,563	43.10	−0.21	39	−6
Independent	92,704	4.29	+1.17	2	+1
Democratic Labor	49,457	2.29	+0.18	0	−
New Staters	17,303	0.80	+0.80	0	−
Communist	5,828	0.27	−0.37	0	−
All others	3,545	0.16	+0.16	0	−
Independent Liberal	0	0	−1.00	0	−1
Total	2,161,570			94	

Popular vote
Labor	43.10%
Liberal	38.47%
Country	10.62%
Independents	4.29%
Democratic Labor	2.29%
Others	1.23%
Parliamentary seats
Labor	39
Liberal	36
Country	17
Independents	2

All electorates were contested

== Aftermath ==
Robert Askin and Charles Cutler remained Premier and Deputy Premier throughout the term of the parliament. Renshaw was replaced as the Leader of the Labor Party by Pat Hills in December 1968. During the parliament there were 5 by-elections. These produced no change in party representation with the exception of the Liberal Party losing Georges River to Labor's Frank Walker.

== See also ==
- Candidates of the 1968 New South Wales state election
- Members of the New South Wales Legislative Assembly, 1968–1971
