= Garry McIlwaine =

Australian politician

Garry David McIlwaine (born 7 October 1944) is a former Australian politician. He was a Labor member of the New South Wales Legislative Assembly, representing Yaralla from 1978 to 1981 and Ryde from 1981 to 1988.

The son of Charles Victor and Leila Josephine McIlwaine, he was born in Concord West in Sydney. He attended school in the Concord area and studied law part-time at the University of Sydney, completing the course in 1969. In 1970 he was admitted to the New South Wales Bar. He had joined the Labor Party in 1965.

In 1978, McIlwaine was selected as the Labor candidate for the marginal Liberal seat of Yaralla, and he defeated the sitting MP, Lerryn Mutton. Yaralla was replaced by Ryde in 1981, which McIlwaine duly won. He held the seat until 1988, when he was defeated by Liberal candidate Michael Photios. Subsequent to his defeat, he held the position of Judicial Registrar of the Federal Court of Australia (1997–98).

New South Wales Legislative Assembly
Preceded by Lerryn Mutton	Member for Yaralla; 1978–1981	District abolished
New district	Member for Ryde; 1981–1988	Succeeded by Michael Photios
