= Jeff Hunter (politician) =

Australian politician

- Constituency: Lake Macquarie

Personal details
- Born: 9 December 1959 (age 66) New South Wales
- Party: Labor Party

Jeffery Hunter (born 9 December 1959) is a retired Australian politician. He was the Member of Parliament for the electorate of Lake Macquarie in the New South Wales Legislative Assembly from 25 May 1991 until 24 March 2007. He was defeated at the 2007 election by the independent Mayor of Lake Macquarie, Greg Piper. He is the son of Merv Hunter, who was the Member for Lake Macquarie from 1969 to 1991.

== Biography ==
Before entering State politics, Hunter was previously a power plant operator for the Electricity Commission of NSW (now Pacific Power). Whilst the Member for Lake Macquarie, Hunter sat and co-chaired on many Standing Committees including: Small Business, Road Safety, Health Care complaints, New South Wales Parliamentary Asia Pacific Friendship Group and the printing committee. Although he was electorally successful, he was never appointed to a ministerial portfolio.

Hunter succeeded his father, Merv Hunter, as Member for Lake Macquarie in 1991, his father had been the Member for Lake Macquarie 22 years. At the 2007 State election, Hunter was defeated by Greg Piper as the member for Lake Macquarie after 15 years, subsequently ending 37 years of Hunter family representation in Lake Macquarie in State Government. However, Jeff's younger brother, Allan, continued to serve as a Councillor in Local Government in the City of Lake Macquarie but retired at the 2008 Local Government elections.

Hunter lost the seat of Lake Macquarie to Greg Piper, the Mayor of Lake Macquarie by 106 votes through preferences.

Hunter has retired to the Southern Lake Macquarie suburb of Wangi Wangi and is enjoying his hobbies such as the environment, swimming, politics and horse riding. He is a current member of the Wangi Wangi Branch of the Labor Party and a delegate on the Party's executive.

New South Wales Legislative Assembly
Preceded by Merv Hunter	Member for Lake Macquarie; 1991–2007	Succeeded by Greg Piper
