= Greg Piper =

Australian politician

Greg Piper MP

32nd Speaker of the New South Wales Legislative Assembly
- Incumbent
- Assumed office 9 May 2023
- Preceded by: Jonathan O'Dea

5th Assistant Speaker of the New South Wales Legislative Assembly
- In office 15 February 2022 – 9 May 2023
- Preceded by: Mark Coure
- Succeeded by: Jason Yat-Sen Li

Member of the New South Wales Parliament for Lake Macquarie
- Incumbent
- Assumed office 24 March 2007
- Preceded by: Jeff Hunter

Personal details
- Born: Gregory Michael Piper; 31 August 1957 (age 68) Coffs Harbour, New South Wales
- Party: Independent
- Spouse: Lyn Piper

Gregory Michael Piper (born 31 August 1957 in Coffs Harbour, New South Wales) is an Australian politician, who is an independent member of the New South Wales Legislative Assembly, representing Lake Macquarie since 2007. Piper was mayor of City of Lake Macquarie between 2004 and 2012, before the enactment of the Local Government Amendment (Members of Parliament) Act, 2012 (NSW) preventing dual membership of state parliament and local councils.

== Early years and background ==
Piper grew up in the Lake Macquarie suburb of Kahibah. He has three children and five grandchildren. In his teenage years, he attended St Pius X high school in Adamstown. When Piper finished school he worked in the steelworks for a year. He did not see a future there, so he took a nursing job at Morisset Hospital, where he worked for 26 years. He now lives on the Morisset Peninsula in Mirrabooka, near the Westlakes suburb of Morisset, with his wife Lyn.

== Political career ==
Piper was first elected to the City of Lake Macquarie Council in 1991 as an independent councillor and was deputy mayor through 2000. He sat on and chaired numerous committees. Piper held the position of chair of the Lake Macquarie Estuary Management Committee and the Lake Macquarie Project Management Committee since the establishment of each. He was also on the Hunter Waste Management and Planning Board for a number of years including a period as chair. He was directly elected as the mayor of Lake Macquarie in March 2004 and again in September 2008, where he received 60% of the first-preference vote.

Piper was elected as the member for Lake Macquarie at the 2007 general election. He sat on the Legislative Assembly's rural and regional Broadband Committee from June 2007 to November 2008 and was a member of the Standing Committee on Natural Resource Management (Climate Change) from 2008 to 2011. In addition, he was a member of the Committee on Transport and Infrastructure from June 2011 to June 2013, the State and Regional Development Committee from March 2013 to March 2015, the Standing Orders and Procedure Committee from March 2013 to March 2015, the Public Accounts Committee from March 2013 to March 2015, and from May 2015 to March 2019, the Select Committee on the Motor Vehicle Repair Industry from November 2013 to July 2014, the Joint Select Committee on Companion Animal Breeding Practices in New South Wales from May 2015 to August 2015, and the Standing Orders and Procedure Committee from May 2015 to March 2019.

He was overwhelmingly re-elected in the 2019 New South Wales state election, winning with a two-candidate-preferred vote of 72.1% against Jo Smith of the Labor Party. Piper was re-elected at the 2023 election with a first-preference vote of over 58%. He accepted the offer of the minority Labor government to become Speaker of the Legislative Assembly.

== Political views ==
On his web site, Piper describes his politics as "left leaning, socially progressive, fiscally cautious". He says that he is staunchly independent and has never been a member of a political party.

New South Wales Legislative Assembly
Preceded by Jeff Hunter	Member for Lake Macquarie; 2007–present	Incumbent
