= Speaker of the New South Wales Legislative Assembly =

Presiding officer of the lower house in the New South Wales Parliament

- Incumbent; Greg Piper since 9 May 2023
- Style: The Honourable; Mr/Madam Speaker (In the House)
- Appointer: The Monarch's Representative at the behest of the Legislative Assembly
- Term length: Elected by the Assembly at the start of each Parliament, and upon a vacancy
- Inaugural holder: Sir Daniel Cooper
- Formation: 1856

The Speaker of the New South Wales Legislative Assembly is the presiding officer of the Legislative Assembly, New South Wales's lower chamber of Parliament. The current Speaker is Greg Piper, who was elected on 9 May 2023.

== Role ==
The Speaker presides over the House's debates, determining which members may speak. The Speaker is also responsible for maintaining order during debate, and may punish members who break the rules of the House. Conventionally, the Speaker remains non-partisan, and renounces all affiliation with their former political party when taking office. The Speaker does not take part in debate nor vote (except to break ties, and even then, subject to conventions that maintain their non-partisan status), although the Speaker is still able to speak. Aside from duties relating to presiding over the House, the Speaker also performs administrative and procedural functions, and remains a constituency Member of Parliament (MP).

The office of the Speaker is recognised in section 31 of the Constitution Act 1902 as the Legislative Assembly's "independent and impartial representative". The first act of the new Parliament, after the swearing in of Members, is the election of a Speaker. Section 31B of the Constitution Act outlines the method of election. Under section 70 of the Parliamentary Electorates and Elections Act 1912, the Speaker issues writs to fill vacancies caused otherwise than by a general election, which would be issued by the Governor.

The Speaker's role in the House is to maintain order, put questions after debate and conduct divisions. In maintaining order the Speaker interprets and applies the Standing Orders and practice of the House by making rulings and decisions.

The Speaker also has extensive administrative functions, being responsible, with the President, for the overall direction of the Parliament. In this, the Presiding Officers are advised by the Clerks of both Houses. The Speaker is solely responsible for the operation of the Department of the Legislative Assembly.

If only one candidate is nominated for election, then no ballot is held, and the Assembly proceeds directly to the motion to appoint the candidate to the Speakership. A similar procedure is used if a Speaker seeks a further term after a general election: no ballot is held, and the Assembly immediately votes on a motion to re-elect the Speaker. If the motion to re-elect the Speaker fails, candidates are nominated, and the Assembly proceeds with voting. Upon the passage of the motion, the Speaker-elect is expected to show reluctance at being chosen. Customarily the speaker-elect is "dragged unwillingly" by MPs to the Speaker's bench. This custom has its roots in the Speaker's original function of communicating the House of Commons' opinions to the monarch. Historically, the Speaker, representing the House to the Monarch, potentially faced the Monarch's anger and therefore required some persuasion to accept the post.

After election, the Speaker ceases to be associated with their former party. In 2007, Richard Torbay was the first independent Speaker since 1917, breaking a pattern of alternation between Labor and Conservative members which had occurred from 1917 through to the 2003 elections of Speakers.

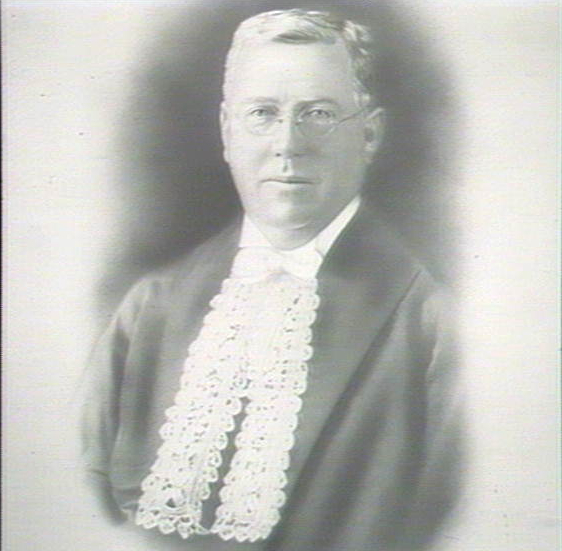
James Dooley (1925–1927) as Speaker, wearing the Labor variation of the dress.

Many Speakers also held higher or other offices while in Parliament: The first Speaker, Sir Daniel Cooper (1856–1860) was later made a Baronet, of Woollahra in New South Wales, in 1863; William Arnold (1865–1875) served in the Robertson and Cowper Ministries before becoming Speaker; Sir George Wigram Allen (1875–1882) also served as a Minister in the first Parkes Government; Edmund Barton (1883–1887) entered the new Federal Parliament in 1901 as the first Prime Minister of Australia (1901–1903) and thereafter served as a Puisne Justice of the High Court of Australia until 1920; James Dooley (1925–1927) before taking up the role of Speaker had served two terms as the Premier of New South Wales in 1921 and from 1921 to 1922; Reginald Weaver (1937–1941), later served briefly as Leader of the Opposition of New South Wales and as the first Leader of the NSW Liberal Party in 1945 before his death and John Aquilina (2003–2007) also served as a Minister in the Unsworth and Carr Labor Governments.

== Dress ==
Following the Westminster tradition inherited from the House of Commons of the United Kingdom, the traditional dress of the speaker includes components of Court dress such as the black silk lay-type gown (similar to a QC's gown), a lace collar or jabot (another variation included a white bow tie with a lace jabot), bar jacket, white gloves and a full-bottomed wig. Often the dress variated according to the party in power, with most Labor party speakers eschewing the wig while retaining the court dress, while conservative and independent speakers tended to wear the full dress.

Reginald Weaver (1937–1941) as Speaker, wearing the full traditional dress.

The Speaker, currently, no longer wears the traditional court dress outfit. Kevin Rozzoli was the last speaker to do so. From 1995 to 2007, Speakers Murray and Aquilina opted not to wear any element of the traditional outfit, preferring business attire as appropriate for a member of parliament. Speaker Torbay also chose not to wear the full court dress of the speaker upon his election in 2007, nevertheless he returned to tradition by wearing the gown during question time and significant occasions such as the Budget. Speakers Hancock and O'Dea have continued this practice. However, there is nothing stopping any given Speaker, if they choose to do so, from assuming the traditional court dress or anything they deem appropriate.

== Speakers of the Legislative Assembly ==
#	Name	Party	Term start	Term end	Term in office
1	Sir Daniel Cooper	None	22 May 1856	31 January 1860	3 years, 254 days
2	Terence Murray	None	31 January 1860	13 October 1862	2 years, 255 days
3	John Hay	None	14 October 1862	31 October 1865	3 years, 17 days
4	William Arnold	None	1 November 1865	1 March 1875	9 years, 120 days
5	Sir George Allen	None	23 March 1875	23 November 1882	7 years, 245 days
6	Edmund Barton	None	3 January 1883	31 January 1887	4 years, 28 days
7	James Young	Free Trade	8 March 1887	21 October 1890	3 years, 227 days
8	Sir Joseph Abbott	Protectionist	22 October 1890	12 June 1900	9 years, 233 days
9	William McCourt	Liberal Reform	13 June 1900	14 November 1910	10 years, 154 days
10	John Cann	Labor	15 November 1910	31 July 1911	258 days
11	Henry Willis	Liberal Reform	24 August 1911	22 July 1913	1 year, 332 days
12	Henry Morton	Independent	22 July 1913	22 December 1913	153 days
13	Dick Meagher	Labor	23 December 1913	16 April 1917	3 years, 114 days
14	John Cohen	Nationalist	17 April 1917	30 January 1919	1 year, 288 days
15	Daniel Levy	Nationalist	19 August 1919	12 December 1921	2 years, 115 days
16	Simon Hickey	Labor	13 December 1921	20 December 1921	7 days
(15)	Daniel Levy	Nationalist	20 December 1921	23 June 1925	3 years, 185 days
17	James Dooley	Labor	24 June 1925	2 November 1927	2 years, 131 days
(15)	Sir Daniel Levy	Nationalist	3 November 1927	24 November 1930	3 years, 21 days
18	Frank Burke	Lang Labor	25 November 1930	23 June 1932	1 year, 211 days
(15)	Sir Daniel Levy	United Australia	24 June 1932	20 May 1937	4 years, 330 days
19	Reginald Weaver	United Australia	4 August 1937	27 May 1941	3 years, 296 days
20	Daniel Clyne	Labor	28 May 1941	27 May 1947	5 years, 364 days
21	Bill Lamb	Labor	28 May 1947	20 April 1959	11 years, 327 days
22	Ray Maher	Labor	21 April 1959	29 January 1965	5 years, 283 days
23	Sir Kevin Ellis	Liberal	26 May 1965	3 December 1973	8 years, 191 days
24	Jim Cameron	Liberal	4 December 1973	24 May 1976	2 years, 172 days
25	Laurie Kelly	Labor	25 May 1976	26 April 1988	11 years, 337 days
26	Kevin Rozzoli	Liberal	27 April 1988	1 May 1995	7 years, 4 days
27	John Murray	Labor	2 May 1995	28 April 2003	7 years, 361 days
28	John Aquilina	Labor	29 April 2003	7 May 2007	4 years, 8 days
29	Richard Torbay	Independent	8 May 2007	2 May 2011	3 years, 359 days
30	Shelley Hancock	Liberal	3 May 2011	7 May 2019	8 years, 4 days
31	Jonathan O'Dea	Liberal	7 May 2019	9 May 2023	4 years, 2 days
32	Greg Piper	Independent	9 May 2023	Incumbent	3 years, 122 days

== Deputy and Assistant Speakers ==
=== Deputy Speakers ===
#	Name	Party	Term start	Term end	Term in office
1	John Price	Labor	11 May 1999	2 March 2007	7 years, 295 days
2	Tony Stewart	Labor	8 May 2007	11 September 2008	1 year, 126 days
3	Tanya Gadiel	Labor	23 September 2008	4 March 2011	2 years, 162 days
4	Thomas George	National	3 May 2011	1 March 2019	7 years, 302 days
5	Leslie Williams	National	7 May 2019	20 September 2020	4 years, 2 days
5	Leslie Williams	Liberal	20 September 2020	9 May 2023	4 years, 2 days
6	Sonia Hornery	Labor	9 May 2023	Incumbent	3 years, 122 days

=== Assistant Speakers ===
#	Name	Party	Term start	Term end	Term in office
1	Alison Megarrity	Labor	8 May 2007	4 March 2011	3 years, 300 days
1	Grant McBride	Labor	8 May 2007	4 March 2011	3 years, 300 days
3	Andrew Fraser	National	3 May 2011	1 March 2019	7 years, 302 days
4	Mark Coure	Liberal	7 May 2019	2 February 2022	2 years, 271 days
5	Greg Piper	Independent	15 February 2022	9 May 2023	1 year, 83 days
6	Jason Li	Labor	9 May 2023	Incumbent	3 years, 122 days
