= George Petersen (politician) =

Australian politician (1921–2000)

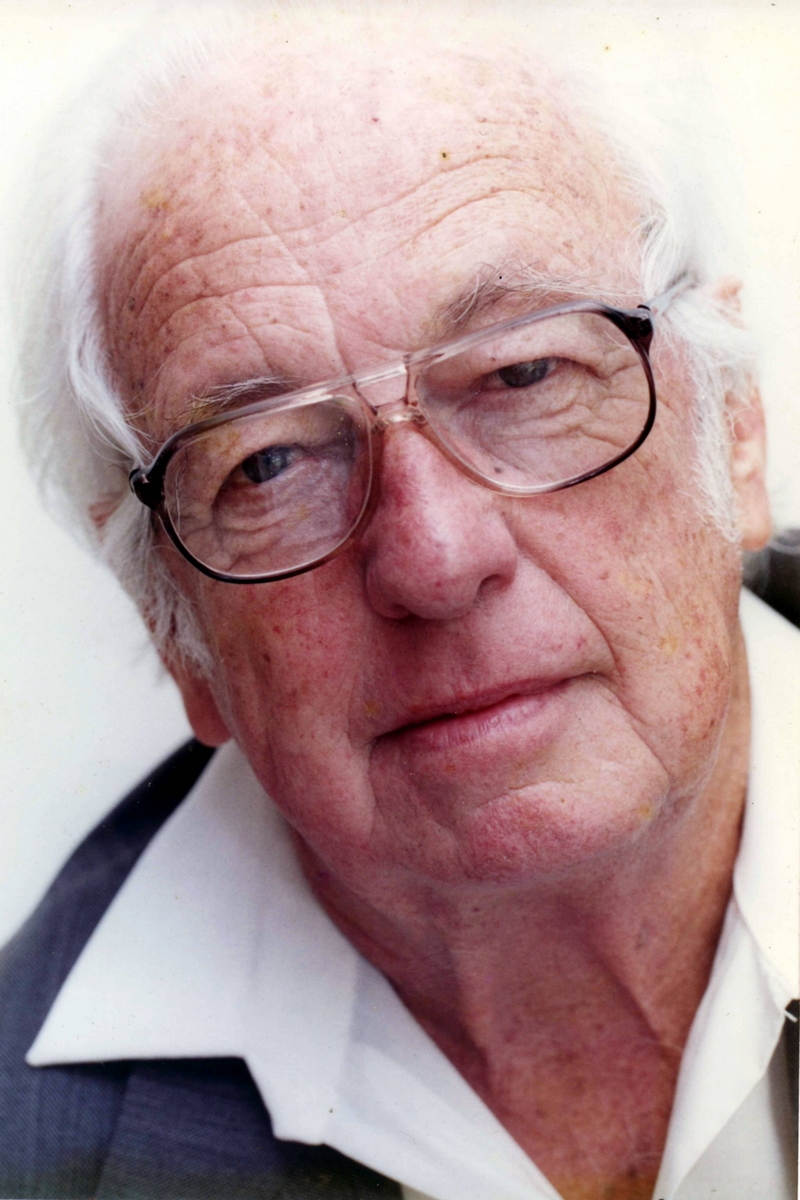

Member of the New South Wales Parliament for Illawarra
- In office 13 February 1971 – 22 February 1988
- Preceded by: New district
- Succeeded by: Terry Rumble

Member of the New South Wales Parliament for Kembla
- In office 24 February 1968 – 13 January 1971
- Preceded by: New district
- Succeeded by: District abolished

Personal details
- Born: 13 May 1921 Childers, Queensland, Australia
- Died: 28 March 2000 (aged 78) Shellharbour, New South Wales, Australia
- Party: Illawarra Workers Party (1987–1988)
- Other political affiliations: Communist (1943–1956); Labor (1957–1987)
- Awards: Pacific Star

Military service
- Allegiance: Australia
- Branch/service: (Australia) Australian Army
- Years of service: 1942–1946
- Rank: Signalman
- Unit: 2/5th Commando Squadron
- Battles/wars: World War II; Borneo campaign

Wilfred George Petersen (13 May 1921 – 28 March 2000) was an Australian politician, affiliated with the Labor Party and elected as a member of the New South Wales Legislative Assembly.

== Early life and background ==
Petersen was born on 13 May 1921 in Childers, Queensland. He was the first of five children born to Hilda Eva Isabel (née Engstrom) and Peter Petersen. He was descended from Scandinavian migrants who came to Queensland in the 1800s.

Petersen was educated at Bundaberg State High School, but owing to hard financial times left at age 15. Petersen found work as a telephonist for the Postmaster-General's Department and as a pensions officer and special magistrate for the Department of Social Services from 1937 to 1968.

In World War II he served in Queensland and Borneo as a Signalman in the 2/5th Commando Squadron from 1942 to 1946. In 1947 he married his first wife, Elaine Verna Tout, and had a daughter in 1953 and then a son in 1956. Later, they divorced and he married Mairi Isobel Wilson Gould in 1975. They had one daughter.

== Political career ==
In 1943 Petersen joined the Communist Party of Australia. He left in 1956 after Khrushchev's Secret Speech, which denounced Stalin. Transferred to a job with the Department of Social Security in Wollongong, New South Wales, in 1957, he soon joined the Australian Labor Party inspired by the Trotskyist method of entryism. Becoming a prominent local member of the party, Petersen was encouraged to run for politics by the local Federal Member for Cunningham, Rex Connor. Consequently, Petersen was preselected as the Labor candidate for and was elected to the New South Wales Legislative Assembly seat of Kembla in 1968. He represented this electorate until the 1971 election, when he moved to the seat of Illawarra.

Petersen was often outspoken even in his own party, speaking out for politically unpopular causes such as prison reform, homosexual law reform, legalised abortion, the Vietnam War, unions and the environment. In 1970, Petersen called for a public inquiry into conditions in New South Wales prisons. Following the burning down of Bathurst gaol in February 1974 and a riot at Maitland gaol a royal commission was held and the report brought down by Justice John Nagle in 1978 vindicated his campaign. He defended the Ananda Marga Three after their conviction for the 1978 Sydney Hilton bombing, and was later vindicated when they were pardoned in 1985.

One particular issue Petersen championed was that of Gay rights and emancipation. Indeed, it was Petersen who initiated in April 1981 the first attempt in New South Wales to bring about Gay law reform in the form of an amendment to the 'Crimes (Sexual Assault) Amendment Act 1981' that would have legalised consenting acts between adults. However, despite support from the Attorney General, Frank Walker, Young Labor, and public opinion polls that supported reform, it was defeated by the Catholic-dominated majority right faction of NSW Labor from inclusion before the act's introduction and prevented from being included for debate in the Legislative Assembly by the Speaker, Laurie Kelly, who ruled it out of order. He did not appeal the ruling under threat of expulsion from the party. Undeterred, in November 1981, Petersen introduced a private members bill which sought to decriminalise homosexual acts in NSW as well as equalise the age of consent to 16. However, after its first reading, the bill was adjourned at the request of opponents of law reform, who used it as an opportunity to rally opposition to the bill. When the bill came to a second reading, the Liberal/Country opposition voted as a bloc against it and over half of the Labor side, freed by the ability to vote according to conscience, joined them, to defeat it 67 votes to 28.

Unsurprisingly therefore, Petersen proved to be a staunch supporter of the bill introduced by Premier Neville Wran, the 'Crimes (Amendment) Act 1984', which decriminalised homosexual acts in NSW. During the debate he not only defended the bill but also pressed his previous support for the equalisation of the age of consent, which was his one criticism as it was not included (it would not be equalised until 2003). In response to the Leader of the National Party, Leon Punch's comments that the bill was an "outrageous and smutty epitaph" which would assist in the "collapse of civilisation through the breakdown of spiritual values", Peterson retorted: "your case is one of blind, homophobic prejudice which takes no account of reality or humanity." Times had moved on since 1981 and the bill, supported by the absence of a conscience vote from the Labor side, was subsequently passed with support from some of the Opposition, including Nick Greiner, on 22 May and assented to on 8 June 1984. In 1985 Peterson criticised the Labor Party as although the party was founded by socialists it had "never even begun to implement a socialist policy" due to "a political structure which represents workers not as workers but as consumers."

== Later life ==
In 1987 the Unsworth Labor government capitulated to demands from the insurance industry that the compensation benefits paid to injured workers must be cut. Petersen refused to support it and crossed the floor to vote against the government's Workers Compensation Act, which he described as "vicious, anti-working class legislation". Facing expulsion from the party, Petersen resigned his party membership attacking the "Irish Catholic conservatism" of the ALP and declaring his loyalty "to the working class and not to any organisation". From 21 July 1987 he held his seat as a member of the Illawarra Workers Party, which he had formed on the principle of protecting worker's rights. Although, at age 66, Petersen had intended to retire at the next election, his principled exit from the ALP led him to run one more time at the 1988 election. Despite a spirited campaign, Petersen was defeated in his seat by the Labor candidate Terry Rumble.

Despite his defeat, Petersen continued to advocate for various issues in public life, including the campaign to prevent development of Shellharbour Beach and opposition to Australia's involvement in the 1991 Gulf War. Petersen died on 28 March 2000 in Shellharbour Hospital. Not long after, he was inducted into the Sydney Gay and Lesbian Mardi Gras Hall of Fame, for services to the gay community.

New South Wales Legislative Assembly
New district	Member for Kembla; 1968 – 1971	District abolished
New district	Member for Illawarra; 1971 – 1988	Succeeded by Terry Rumble
