= Peter Westerway =

Australian public servant and Labor Party official

Peter Brian Westerway (27 February 1931 – 26 May 2015) was an Australian public servant and Labor Party official. Peter Westerway was the son of a member of the NSW Fire Brigade and had a twin brother James. He was educated at North Sydney Boys High School and Sydney University where he graduated with First Class Honours in Government.

Westerway, whose background was in television, was elected secretary of the New South Wales branch of the Labor Party in 1969, with the support of the right-wing faction. He later served as chairman of the Australian Broadcasting Tribunal from 1991 to 1992.

He was a visiting professor at the Graduate School of Management, Macquarie University
