= Electoral district of Kembla =

Former state electoral district of New South Wales, Australia

Kembla was an electoral district of the Legislative Assembly in the Australian State of New South Wales for a single term from 1968 to 1971, named after the Mount Kembla or Port Kembla. It replaced part of Wollongong-Kembla and Illawarra and was replaced by Illawarra. Its only member was George Petersen.

== Members for Kembla ==
Member	Party	Term
George Petersen	Labor	1968–1971

== Election results ==
1968 New South Wales state election: Kembla
Party	Candidate	Votes	%	±%
Labor	George Petersen	13,840	61.8	
Liberal	Jack Walker	6,292	28.1	
Independent	Teresa Gibbons	1,304	5.8	
Communist	Melva Merletto	561	2.5	
Independent	Thomas Malcolm	399	1.8	
Total formal votes		22,396	96.3	
Informal votes		864	3.7	
Turnout		23,260	94.6	
Two-party-preferred result
Labor	George Petersen	14,934	66.7	
Liberal	Jack Walker	7,462	33.3	
Labor win		(new seat)		
