= Merv Hunter =

Australian politician

Member of the New South Wales Parliament for Lake Macquarie
- Preceded by: Jim Simpson
- Succeeded by: Jeff Hunter

Personal details
- Born: 23 February 1926 Waratah, New South Wales
- Died: 2 January 2013 (aged 86) Arcadia Vale, New South Wales
- Party: Labor Party
- Profession: Fitter

Mervyn (Merv) Leslie Hunter (23 February 1926 – 2 January 2013) was an Australian politician. He was the state Member of Parliament for the electorate of Lake Macquarie representing the Labor Party (ALP) in the New South Wales Legislative Assembly from 1969 to 1991 and was the Shire President of the City of Lake Macquarie in 1969, resigning to enter the NSW Parliament. His son Jeff Hunter was the member for Lake Macquarie from 1991 to 2007.

He was a fitter and turner by trade. He was educated at Adamstown Public School, Newcastle Junior High School, Junee High School and Newcastle Technical College. He apprenticed as a fitter and turner, previously fitter and machinist.

Hunter joined the Labor Party in 1959. He was President of the New South Wales Parliamentary Labor Party, Member of Caucas committees on Local Government; Water Resources; Housing; Mineral Resources; Industry and Small Business; Energy and Technology.

Hunter was the Shire President of the Shire of Lake Macquarie in 1969 and Deputy President from 1965 to 1969. He served in the Shire of Lake Macquarie as an Alderman from 1962 to 1971. He left Local Government after the expiry of his term as an Alderman to continue on in his position as member for Lake Macquarie.

Two of Hunter's sons, Jeff and Alan Hunter, were Councillors on the City of Lake Macquarie. Jeff later succeeded his father as member for Lake Macquarie.

After retiring from politics, Hunter retired to the suburb of Arcadia Vale in Southern Lake Macquarie. He enjoyed recreational interests in swimming, lawn bowls and sailing in retirement and was given Life Membership to Wangi Wangi Workers Club in Southern Lake Macquarie. He died in January 2013.

New South Wales Legislative Assembly
Preceded by Jim Simpson	Member for Lake Macquarie; 1969–1991	Succeeded by Jeff Hunter
