= Electoral district of Lake Macquarie =

Lake Macquarie New South Wales—Legislative Assembly
- Interactive map of district boundaries from the 2023 state election
- State: New South Wales
- Dates current: 1950–present
- MP: Greg Piper
- Party: Independent
- Namesake: Lake Macquarie
- Electors: 59,020 (2023)
- Area: 531.46 km^{2} (205.2 sq mi)
- Demographic: Outer-metropolitan
Electorates around Lake Macquarie:
Cessnock	Cessnock	Wallsend
Cessnock; Wyong	Lake Macquarie	Charlestown; Swansea
Wyong	Wyong	Swansea

Lake Macquarie is an electoral district of the Legislative Assembly in Greater Newcastle, Hunter region of the Australian state of New South Wales. It is represented by the independent Greg Piper.

== Geography ==
Lake Macquarie is entirely located in the City of Lake Macquarie, Greater Newcastle, and includes suburbs as far north as Killingworth, Boolaroo and Cardiff, and as far east as Cardiff South. Suburbs further north are in Cessnock and Wallsend, and suburbs further east are in Charlestown and Swansea.

== Members for Lake Macquarie ==
Member	Party	Term
Jim Simpson	Labor	1950–1968
Merv Hunter	Labor	1969–1991
Jeff Hunter	Labor	1991–2007
Greg Piper	Independent	2007–present

== Election results ==
2023 New South Wales state election: Lake Macquarie
Party	Candidate	Votes	%	±%
Independent	Greg Piper	29,093	57.5	+3.0
Labor	Steve Ryan	10,031	19.8	−0.8
Liberal	Joshua Beer	5,091	10.1	−5.5
Shooters, Fishers, Farmers	Jason Lesage	3,203	6.3	+6.3
Greens	Kim Grierson	2,430	4.8	−0.1
Sustainable Australia	Felipe Gore-Escalante	761	1.5	0.0
Total formal votes		50,609	97.3	+0.8
Informal votes		1,386	2.7	−0.8
Turnout		51,995	88.1	−0.1
Notional two-party-preferred count
Labor	Steve Ryan	16,981	62.8	+6.3
Liberal	Joshua Beer	10,069	37.2	−6.3
Two-candidate-preferred result
Independent	Greg Piper	32,905	74.1	+0.9
Labor	Steve Ryan	11,492	25.9	−0.9
Independent hold		Swing	+0.9	
