= Jim Simpson (Australian politician) =

Scottish-Australian trade unionist, coal miner and politician

The Honourable Jim Simpson

Member of the New South Wales Parliament for Lake Macquarie
- In office 17 June 1950 – 10 December 1968
- Preceded by: New district
- Succeeded by: Merv Hunter

Personal details
- Born: 22 January 1905 Shotts, Lanarkshire, Scotland
- Died: 10 December 1968 (aged 63) Sydney, New South Wales, Australia
- Party: Socialist Labor Party; Australian Labor Party (New South Wales Branch)

James Brunton Simpson (22 January 1905 – 10 December 1968) was a Scottish-Australian trade unionist, coal miner and politician, elected as a member of the New South Wales Legislative Assembly for Lake Macquarie for the NSW Branch of the Labor Party.

== Early life ==
Simpson was born at Shotts, Lanarkshire, Scotland and educated at Dykehead Public School. He started work at the age of fourteen as a coal miner. He arrived in New South Wales with his parents in 1921 and worked in Stockton Borehole Colliery at Cockle Creek until was seriously injured in a mining accident in 1924 and had to be hospitalised for seven months.

He studied commercial subjects and was employed by the Northern Districts Miners' Federation as its assistant secretary in 1927. He was secretary of the federation from 1940 to 1950. He married Grace Ellen Gallimore in May 1941 and they had one daughter and two sons.

== Political career ==
Simpson was elected as the Labor member for Lake Macquarie in 1950 and was re-elected in the seat until his death. He was Minister without portfolio from March 1956 to November 1957 and then Secretary for Mines (renamed Minister for Mines from 1 April 1959) until May 1965 when the Renshaw government was defeated.

He died in Sydney on 10 December 1968 (aged 63). In 1963 the City of Lake Macquarie named the "J. B. Simpson Pool" in Speers Point in his honour.

== Notes ==
New South Wales Legislative Assembly
| New district | Member for Lake Macquarie; 1950–1968 | Succeeded by Merv Hunter |
Political offices
| Preceded by Roger Nott | Secretary for Mines; 1957–1959 | Renamed Minister for Mines |
| New title | Minister for Mines; 1959–1965 | Succeeded by Tom Lewis |
