= Lerryn Mutton =

Australian politician

Lerryn Mutton OAM

Member of the New South Wales Legislative Assembly for Yaralla
- In office 24 February 1968 – 12 September 1978
- Preceded by: District created
- Succeeded by: Garry McIlwaine

Personal details
- Born: 12 October 1924 Concord, New South Wales
- Died: 26 July 2015 (aged 90) MacMasters Beach, New South Wales
- Party: Liberal Party
- Spouse: Mavis Tucker
- Children: One daughter, three sons
- Parent: Brice Mutton (father)
- Occupation: Building contractor

Military service
- Allegiance: Australia
- Branch/service: Royal Australian Air Force
- Years of service: 1942–1946
- Rank: Pilot Officer
- Unit: No. 93 Squadron RAAF; No. 87 Squadron RAAF

Lerryn William Mutton, OAM (12 October 1924 – 26 July 2015) was an Australian politician. He was the Liberal member for Yaralla in the New South Wales Legislative Assembly from 1968 to 1978.

Mutton was born in Concord, the son of Brice Mutton (member for Concord in 1949) and Lilian Taylor. He was educated at North Strathfield Public School and Fort Street Boys High School before working in his father's building business. He served in the RAAF from 1942 to 1946, seeing action as a pilot in Labuan and Borneo. He married Mavis Tucker on 29 October 1949, with whom he had four children. In 1953 he was elected to Concord Council, serving until 1968 (as Mayor from 1961 to 1962). He was also active in the local Liberal Party.

In 1968, Mutton was selected as the Liberal candidate for the new seat of Yaralla; he defeated the sitting Labor member for the abolished seat of Concord, Thomas Murphy. He held the seat until 1978, when he was defeated by Labor candidate Garry McIlwaine.

He was awarded the Medal of the Order of Australia on 14 June 2010.

New South Wales Legislative Assembly
New district	Member for Yaralla; 1968–1978	Succeeded by Garry McIlwaine
