= Electoral district of Yaralla =

Former state electoral district

Yaralla was an electoral district of the Legislative Assembly in the Australian state of New South Wales. It was created in 1968, named after Yaralla Estate and largely replaced Concord, extending west to the districts of Parramatta and Granville. It also extended to the north of the Parramatta River, absorbing parts of Eastwood, Parramatta and Ryde It was abolished in 1981 with the area south of the river being absorbed by Electoral district of Burwood and the area north of the river by the re-created district of Ryde. The first member was Lerryn Mutton (Liberal) who had previously unsuccessfully contested Concord. The sitting member Garry McIlwaine (Labor) successfully contested Ryde.

== Members for Yaralla ==
Member	Party	Period
Lerryn Mutton	Liberal	1968–1978
Garry McIlwaine	Labor	1978–1981

== Election results ==
1978 New South Wales state election: Yaralla
Party	Candidate	Votes	%	±%
Labor	Garry McIlwaine	16,219	56.5	+10.9
Liberal	Lerryn Mutton	11,533	40.1	−14.3
Democrats	Christopher Dunkerley	973	3.4	+3.4
Total formal votes		28,725	97.6	−0.2
Informal votes		697	2.4	+0.2
Turnout		29,422	92.5	+1.1
Two-party-preferred result
Labor	Garry McIlwaine	16,706	58.2	+12.6
Liberal	Lerryn Mutton	12,019	41.8	−12.6
Labor gain from Liberal		Swing	+12.6	
