= Electoral district of Corrimal =

State electoral district of New South Wales, Australia

Corrimal was an electoral district for the Legislative Assembly in the Australian State of New South Wales from 1968 to 1988, named after the suburb of Corrimal. It was replaced by Keira. Its only member was Laurie Kelly, representing the Labor Party.

== Members for Corrimal ==
Member	Party	Term
Laurie Kelly	Labor	1968–1988

== Election results ==
1984 New South Wales state election: Corrimal
Party	Candidate	Votes	%	±%
Labor	Laurie Kelly	21,068	68.9	−1.1
Liberal	Colin Bruton	9,527	31.1	+9.0
Total formal votes		30,595	97.2	+0.4
Informal votes		874	2.8	−0.4
Turnout		31,469	94.0	+0.9
Labor hold		Swing	−6.8	
