= Laurie Kelly (politician) =

Australian politician

The Honourable Laurie Kelly AM

25th Speaker of the New South Wales Legislative Assembly
- In office 25 May 1976 – 26 April 1988
- Premier: Neville Wran; Barrie Unsworth; Nick Greiner
- Preceded by: Jim Cameron
- Succeeded by: Kevin Rozzoli

Member of the New South Wales Legislative Assembly for Corrimal
- In office 24 February 1968 – 22 February 1988
- Preceded by: New district
- Succeeded by: District abolished

Personal details
- Born: Lawrence Borthwick Kelly Jr. 5 November 1928 Thirroul, New South Wales, Australia
- Died: 11 July 2018 (aged 89)
- Cause of death: pneumonia
- Party: Labor Party
- Spouse: Rhonda Ali (m. 1954; died 2018)
- Relations: Laurie Kelly Sr. (father)
- Children: 2

Lawrence Borthwick Kelly Jr. AM (5 November 1928 – 11 July 2018) was an Australian politician. He was the Labor member for Corrimal in the New South Wales Legislative Assembly from 1968 to 1988, and served as Speaker from 1976 to 1988.

Kelly was born in Thirroul, the son of Laurie Kelly Sr., who was a member of the Legislative Assembly from 1947 to 1955. He was educated at Thirroul Primary School and Wollongong High School, and after leaving school worked as an accountant. He joined the Labor Party in 1948. On 23 October 1954, he married Rhonda Ali, with whom he had two children and who preceded him in death.

In 1968, Kelly was selected as the Labor candidate for the seat of Corrimal, largely a successor to his father's old seat of Bulli. Elected easily, he never had difficulty in winning re-election. He was appointed Speaker in 1976, serving until 1988, when his seat of Corrimal was abolished. Kelly challenged sitting Independent MP Frank Arkell for his seat in Wollongong, but was defeated.

Kelly died on 11 July 2018 due to complications of pneumonia that he had contracted earlier in the month.

New South Wales Legislative Assembly
| New district | Member for Corrimal; 1968–1988 | District abolished |
| Preceded by Jim Cameron | Speaker of the New South Wales Legislative Assembly; 1976–1988 | Succeeded by Kevin Rozzoli |
