= Electoral results for the district of Port Stephens =

Election results for Port Stephens, New South Wales, Australia

Port Stephens, an electoral district of the Legislative Assembly in the Australian state of New South Wales, was established in 1988.

== Members for Port Stephens ==
| Election | Member | Party |
|---|---|---|
| 1988 | Bob Martin | Labor |
| 1988 by | Bob Martin | Labor |
| 1991 | Bob Martin | Labor |
| 1995 | Bob Martin | Labor |
| 1999 | John Bartlett | Labor |
| 2003 | John Bartlett | Labor |
| 2007 | Craig Baumann | Liberal |
| 2011 | Craig Baumann | Liberal |
| 2015 | Kate Washington | Labor |
| 2019 | Kate Washington | Labor |
| 2023 | Kate Washington | Labor |

== Election results ==
=== Elections in the 2020s ===
==== 2023 ====
2023 New South Wales state election: Port Stephens
| Party | Candidate | Votes | % | ±% |
|---|---|---|---|---|
| Labor | Kate Washington | 27,957 | 53.60 | +5.46 |
| Liberal | Nathan Errington | 11,883 | 22.78 | −17.14 |
| One Nation | Mark Watson | 6,720 | 12.88 | +12.88 |
| Greens | Jordan Jensen | 2,511 | 4.81 | +1.01 |
| Animal Justice | Michelle Buckmaster | 1,569 | 3.01 | +0.39 |
| Informed Medical Options | Angela Ketas | 769 | 1.47 | +1.47 |
| Sustainable Australia | Beverley Jelfs | 752 | 1.44 | −0.54 |
| Total formal votes | | 52,161 | 97.18 | +0.66 |
| Informal votes | | 1,511 | 2.82 | −0.66 |
| Turnout | | 53,672 | 89.04 | −2.03 |
Two-party-preferred result
| Labor | Kate Washington | 30,777 | 69.02 | +13.27 |
| Liberal | Nathan Errington | 13,812 | 30.98 | −13.27 |
| Labor hold | | Swing | +13.27 | |

=== Elections in the 2010s ===
==== 2019 ====
2019 New South Wales state election: Port Stephens
| Party | Candidate | Votes | % | ±% |
|---|---|---|---|---|
| Labor | Kate Washington | 23,896 | 48.14 | +1.02 |
| Liberal | Jaimie Abbott | 19,818 | 39.92 | −1.03 |
| Greens | Maureen Magee | 1,885 | 3.80 | −2.86 |
| Independent | Bill Doran | 1,756 | 3.54 | +3.54 |
| Animal Justice | Theresa Taylor | 1,303 | 2.62 | +2.62 |
| Sustainable Australia | Bradley Jelfs | 984 | 1.98 | +1.98 |
| Total formal votes | | 49,642 | 96.52 | −0.17 |
| Informal votes | | 1,790 | 3.48 | +0.17 |
| Turnout | | 51,432 | 91.07 | −1.28 |
Two-party-preferred result
| Labor | Kate Washington | 25,766 | 55.75 | +1.03 |
| Liberal | Jaimie Abbott | 20,448 | 44.25 | −1.03 |
| Labor hold | | Swing | +1.03 | |

==== 2015 ====
2015 New South Wales state election: Port Stephens
| Party | Candidate | Votes | % | ±% |
|---|---|---|---|---|
| Labor | Kate Washington | 22,161 | 47.1 | +20.4 |
| Liberal | Ken Jordan | 19,265 | 41.0 | −12.1 |
| Greens | Rochelle Flood | 3,132 | 6.7 | −1.4 |
| No Land Tax | Joe Shirley | 1,331 | 2.8 | +2.8 |
| Christian Democrats | Peter Arena | 1,149 | 2.4 | +0.2 |
| Total formal votes | | 47,038 | 96.7 | +0.2 |
| Informal votes | | 1,610 | 3.3 | −0.2 |
| Turnout | | 48,648 | 92.3 | +3.0 |
Two-party-preferred result
| Labor | Kate Washington | 24,221 | 54.7 | +19.5 |
| Liberal | Ken Jordan | 20,045 | 45.3 | −19.5 |
| Labor gain from Liberal | | Swing | +19.5 | |

==== 2011 ====
2011 New South Wales state election: Port Stephens
| Party | Candidate | Votes | % | ±% |
|---|---|---|---|---|
| Liberal | Craig Baumann | 22,956 | 51.1 | +8.6 |
| Labor | Kate Washington | 12,781 | 28.5 | −13.2 |
| Greens | Liz Stephens | 4,062 | 9.0 | +3.0 |
| Fishing Party | Paul Hennelly | 3,002 | 6.7 | +2.0 |
| Christian Democrats | Julian Grayson | 1,083 | 2.4 | −0.5 |
| Family First | Christopher Stokes | 1,018 | 2.3 | +2.3 |
| Total formal votes | | 44,902 | 97.1 | −0.1 |
| Informal votes | | 1,349 | 2.9 | +0.1 |
| Turnout | | 46,251 | 93.4 | +0.1 |
Two-party-preferred result
| Liberal | Craig Baumann | 24,561 | 62.4 | +12.4 |
| Labor | Kate Washington | 14,770 | 37.6 | −12.4 |
| Liberal hold | | Swing | +12.4 | |

=== Elections in the 2000s ===
==== 2007 ====
2007 New South Wales state election: Port Stephens
| Party | Candidate | Votes | % | ±% |
|---|---|---|---|---|
| Liberal | Craig Baumann | 17,881 | 42.5 | +8.7 |
| Labor | Jim Arneman | 17,536 | 41.7 | −6.2 |
| Greens | Charmian Eckersley | 2,541 | 6.0 | −0.3 |
| Fishing Party | Paul Hennelly | 1,972 | 4.7 | +4.7 |
| Christian Democrats | Margaret Higgins | 1,235 | 2.9 | +1.4 |
| AAFI | Lawrence Wood | 912 | 2.2 | +2.1 |
| Total formal votes | | 42,077 | 97.4 | −0.2 |
| Informal votes | | 1,141 | 2.6 | +0.2 |
| Turnout | | 43,218 | 93.3 | |
Two-party-preferred result
| Liberal | Craig Baumann | 19,369 | 50.1 | +7.3 |
| Labor | Jim Arneman | 19,301 | 49.9 | −7.3 |
| Liberal gain from Labor | | Swing | +7.3 | |

==== 2003 ====
2003 New South Wales state election: Port Stephens
| Party | Candidate | Votes | % | ±% |
|---|---|---|---|---|
| Labor | John Bartlett | 21,308 | 49.7 | +4.0 |
| Liberal | Sally Dover | 14,811 | 34.5 | +34.5 |
| Greens | Tom Griffiths | 2,974 | 6.9 | +1.4 |
| Independent | Tony King | 1,164 | 2.7 | +1.6 |
| One Nation | Paul Fuller | 1,047 | 2.4 | −10.6 |
| Democrats | Felicity Boyd | 828 | 1.9 | −1.4 |
| Christian Democrats | Brian Milton | 776 | 1.8 | −3.0 |
| Total formal votes | | 42,908 | 97.4 | −0.4 |
| Informal votes | | 1,150 | 2.6 | +0.4 |
| Turnout | | 44,058 | 92.8 | |
Two-party-preferred result
| Labor | John Bartlett | 23,129 | 59.3 | −3.0 |
| Liberal | Sally Dover | 15,845 | 40.7 | +40.7 |
| Labor hold | | Swing | −3.0 | |

=== Elections in the 1990s ===
==== 1999 ====
1999 New South Wales state election: Port Stephens
| Party | Candidate | Votes | % | ±% |
|---|---|---|---|---|
| Labor | John Bartlett | 18,415 | 45.6 | −6.5 |
| National | Geoff Robinson | 9,650 | 23.9 | +23.9 |
| One Nation | Mark Conway | 5,247 | 13.0 | +13.0 |
| Greens | Glen Stevenson | 2,237 | 5.5 | −1.0 |
| Christian Democrats | Sally Dover | 1,930 | 4.8 | +0.9 |
| Democrats | Felicity Boyd | 1,345 | 3.3 | +0.4 |
| Independent | Maxina McCann | 1,073 | 2.7 | +2.7 |
| Citizens Electoral Council | Tony King | 449 | 1.1 | +1.1 |
| Total formal votes | | 40,346 | 97.7 | +3.5 |
| Informal votes | | 932 | 2.3 | −3.5 |
| Turnout | | 41,278 | 94.2 | |
Two-party-preferred result
| Labor | John Bartlett | 20,495 | 62.3 | +2.6 |
| National | Geoff Robinson | 12,421 | 37.7 | −2.6 |
| Labor hold | | Swing | +2.6 | |

==== 1995 ====
1995 New South Wales state election: Port Stephens
| Party | Candidate | Votes | % | ±% |
|---|---|---|---|---|
| Labor | Bob Martin | 18,917 | 51.6 | −2.9 |
| Liberal | Tony McCormack | 12,897 | 35.2 | +6.5 |
| Greens | Cathy Burgess | 2,281 | 6.2 | +6.2 |
| Call to Australia | Sally Dover | 1,446 | 3.9 | +3.9 |
| Democrats | Ronald Hellyer | 1,104 | 3.0 | −2.4 |
| Total formal votes | | 36,645 | 94.3 | +1.4 |
| Informal votes | | 2,222 | 5.7 | −1.4 |
| Turnout | | 38,867 | 95.9 | |
Two-party-preferred result
| Labor | Bob Martin | 20,739 | 59.0 | −1.1 |
| Liberal | Tony McCormack | 14,440 | 41.0 | +1.1 |
| Labor hold | | Swing | −1.1 | |

==== 1991 ====
1991 New South Wales state election: Port Stephens
| Party | Candidate | Votes | % | ±% |
|---|---|---|---|---|
| Labor | Bob Martin | 17,498 | 54.5 | +15.1 |
| Liberal | Lee Mather | 9,209 | 28.7 | −8.9 |
| National | Len Roberts | 3,665 | 11.4 | +6.4 |
| Democrats | Lance Woods | 1,739 | 5.4 | +4.7 |
| Total formal votes | | 32,111 | 92.9 | −3.9 |
| Informal votes | | 2,449 | 7.1 | +3.9 |
| Turnout | | 34,560 | 95.0 | |
Two-party-preferred result
| Labor | Bob Martin | 18,515 | 60.1 | +13.1 |
| Liberal | Lee Mather | 12,315 | 39.9 | −13.1 |
| Labor notional gain from Liberal | | Swing | +13.1 | |

Port Stephens became a notional Liberal seat as a result of the 1990 redistribution, however Bob Martin (Labor) retained the seat with an increased margin.

=== Elections in the 1980s ===
==== 1988 by-election ====
1988 Port Stephens by-election Saturday 5 November
| Party | Candidate | Votes | % | ±% |
|---|---|---|---|---|
| Labor | Bob Martin (re-elected) | 15,953 | 53.6 | +11.4 |
| Liberal | Bob Scott | 8,930 | 30.0 | −10.4 |
| Independent | Innes Creighton | 4,368 | 14.7 | |
| Independent | Arthur Dalton | 496 | 1.7 | |
| Total formal votes | | 29,747 | 98.1 | |
| Informal votes | | 581 | 1.9 | |
| Turnout | | 30,328 | 87.0 | |
Two-party-preferred result
| Labor | Bob Martin | 17,925 | 63.0 | +12.9 |
| Liberal | Bob Scott | 10,521 | 37.0 | −12.9 |
| Labor hold | | Swing | +12.9 (Note: Compared to the result at the 1988 election.) | |

The 1988 Port Stephens election was declared void due to bribery.

==== 1988 ====
1988 New South Wales state election: Port Stephens
| Party | Candidate | Votes | % | ±% |
|---|---|---|---|---|
| Labor | Bob Martin | 12,967 | 42.2 | −7.6 |
| Liberal | Bob Scott | 12,391 | 40.4 | +10.3 |
| Independent | George Perrin | 4,119 | 13.4 | +13.4 |
| Independent | Arthur Dalton | 1,227 | 4.0 | +4.0 |
| Total formal votes | | 30,704 | 96.6 | −1.3 |
| Informal votes | | 1,072 | 3.4 | +1.3 |
| Turnout | | 31,776 | 94.6 | |
Two-party-preferred result
| Labor | Bob Martin | 14,235 | 50.2 | −10.2 |
| Liberal | Bob Scott | 14,145 | 49.8 | +10.2 |
| Labor notional hold | | Swing | −10.2 | |
