= Members of the New South Wales Legislative Assembly, 1988–1991 =

Members of the New South Wales Legislative Assembly who served in the 49th parliament held their seats from 1988 to 1991. They were elected at the 1988 state election, and at by-elections. The Speaker was Kevin Rozzoli.

Name	Party	Electorate	Term in office
Pam Allan	Labor	Wentworthville	1988–2007
Richard Amery	Labor	Riverstone	1983–2015
Peter Anderson (Note: Liverpool Labor MLA George Paciullo resigned on 19 February 1989. Labor candidate Peter Anderson, a former member for Penrith who had lost his seat at the 1988 election, won the resulting by-election on 29 April 1989.)	Labor	Liverpool	1978–1988, 1989–1995
Allan Andrews	Liberal	Heathcote	1988–1991
John Aquilina	Labor	Blacktown	1981–2011
Tony Aquilina	Labor	Mulgoa	1988–1995
Frank Arkell	Independent	Wollongong	1984–1991
Ian Armstrong	National	Lachlan	1981–2007
Ray Aston (Note: Vaucluse Liberal MLA Ray Aston died on 23 May 1988. Liberal candidate Michael Yabsley, the then-recently defeated member for Bligh, was elected unopposed as his replacement on 6 June 1988.)	Liberal	Vaucluse	1986–1988
Bruce Baird	Liberal	Northcott	1984–1995
Don Beck	National	Murwillumbah	1984–1999
Bill Beckroge	Labor	Broken Hill	1981–1999
David Berry	Liberal	Bathurst	1988–1991
John Books	Liberal	Parramatta	1988–1991
John Booth	Liberal	Wakehurst	1984–1991
Ken Booth (Note: Wallsend Labor MLA Ken Booth died on 2 November 1988. Labor candidate John Mills won the resulting by-election on 17 December 1988.)	Labor	Wallsend	1960–1988
Laurie Brereton (Note: Heffron Labor MLA Laurie Brereton resigned on 16 February 1990 to contest Kingsford-Smith in the Australian House of Representatives at the 1990 election. Labor candidate Deirdre Grusovin, a member of the Legislative Council who had resigned to contest the lower house seat, won the resulting by-election on 23 June 1990.)	Labor	Heffron	1970–1971, 1973–1990
Bob Carr	Labor	Maroubra	1983–2005
Fred Caterson (Note: The Hills Liberal MLA Fred Caterson resigned on 31 July 1990. Liberal candidate Tony Packard won the resulting by-election on 1 September 1990.)	Liberal	The Hills	1976–1990
Ian Causley	National	Clarence	1984–1996
Ray Chappell	National	Northern Tablelands	1987–1999
Bob Christie	Labor	Seven Hills	1981–1991
Michael Cleary	Labor	Coogee	1974–1991
Peter Cochran	National	Monaro	1988–1998
Anne Cohen	Liberal	Minchinbury	1988–1995
Peter Collins	Liberal	Middle Harbour	1981–2003
Janice Crosio (Note: Smithfield Labor MLA Janice Crosio resigned on 16 February 1990, to contest Prospect in the Australian House of Representatives at the 1990 election. Labor candidate Carl Scully won the resulting by-election on 23 June 1990.)	Labor	Smithfield	1981–1990
Adrian Cruickshank	National	Murrumbidgee	1984–1999
Wes Davoren	Labor	Lakemba	1984–1995
John Dowd	Liberal	Lane Cove	1975–1991
Chris Downy	Liberal	Sutherland	1988–1997
Tony Doyle	Labor	Peats	1985–1994
Richard Face	Labor	Charlestown	1972–2003
John Fahey	Liberal	Southern Highlands	1984–1996
Laurie Ferguson (Note: Granville Labor MLA Laurie Ferguson resigned on 16 February 1990, to contest Reid in the Australian House of Representatives at the 1990 election. Labor candidate Kim Yeadon won the resulting by-election on 23 June 1990.)	Labor	Granville	1984–1990
Andrew Fraser (Note: Coffs Harbour National MLA Matt Singleton resigned on 11 September 1990. National candidate Andrew Fraser won the resulting by-election on 3 November 1990.)	National	Coffs Harbour	1990–2019
Dawn Fraser	Independent	Balmain	1988–1991
Paul Gibson	Labor	Londonderry	1988–2011
Ian Glachan	Liberal	Albury	1988–2003
Bob Graham	Liberal	The Entrance	1988–1991
Nick Greiner	Liberal	Ku-ring-gai	1980–1992
Terry Griffiths	Liberal	Georges River	1988–1995
Deirdre Grusovin	Labor	Heffron	1990–2003
Bob Harrison	Labor	Kiama	1986–1999
Chris Hartcher	Liberal	Gosford	1988–2015
John Hatton	Independent	South Coast	1973–1995
David Hay	Liberal	Manly	1984–1991
Merv Hunter	Labor	Lake Macquarie	1969–1991
Geoff Irwin	Labor	Fairfield	1984–1995
Bruce Jeffery	National	Port Macquarie	1984–1999
George Keegan	Independent	Newcastle	1988–1991
Malcolm Kerr	Liberal	Cronulla	1984–2011
Michael Knight	Labor	Campbelltown	1981–2003
Craig Knowles (Note: Macquarie Fields Labor MLA Stan Knowles resigned on 11 October 1990. His son, Labor candidate Craig Knowles, won the resulting by-election on 3 November 1990.)	Labor	Macquarie Fields	1990–2005
Stan Knowles	Labor	Macquarie Fields	1981–1990
Brian Langton	Labor	Kogarah	1983–1999
Jim Longley	Liberal	Pittwater	1986–1996
Bill Lovelee	Labor	Bass Hill	1988–1991
Wendy Machin	National	Manning	1985–1996
Ted Mack (Note: North Shore independent MLA Ted Mack resigned on 16 September 1988. Independent candidate Robyn Read won the resulting by-election on 5 November 1988.)	Independent	North Shore	1981–1988
Col Markham	Labor	Keira	1988–2003
Bob Martin (Note: Bob Martin was initially declared elected as the Labor member for Port Stephens, but had his election voided by the Court of Disputed Returns on 19 September 1988. Martin then won the resulting by-election on 5 November 1988.)	Labor	Port Stephens	1988, 1988–1999
Guy Matheson	Liberal	Penrith	1988–1991
Ian McManus	Labor	Burragorang	1987–2003
Wayne Merton	Liberal	Carlingford	1988–2011
Terry Metherell	Liberal	Davidson	1981–1992
John Mills	Labor	Wallsend	1988–2007
Clover Moore	Independent	Bligh	1988–2012
Harry Moore	Labor	Wyong	1981–1991
Tim Moore	Liberal	Gordon	1976–1992
Barry Morris	Liberal	Blue Mountains	1988–1994
Kevin Moss	Labor	Canterbury	1986–2003
John Murray	Labor	Drummoyne	1982–2003
Wal Murray	National	Barwon	1976–1995
Peter Nagle	Labor	Auburn	1988–2001
John Newman	Labor	Cabramatta	1986–1994
Sandra Nori	Labor	McKell	1988–2007
George Paciullo	Labor	Liverpool	1971–1989
Tony Packard	Liberal	The Hills	1990–1993
Don Page	National	Ballina	1988–2015
Ernie Page	Labor	Waverley	1981–2003
Noel Park	National	Tamworth	1973–1991
Gerry Peacocke	National	Dubbo	1981–1999
Ivan Petch	Liberal	Gladesville	1988–1995
Ron Phillips	Liberal	Miranda	1984–1999
Michael Photios	Liberal	Ryde	1988–1999
Neil Pickard	Liberal	Hornsby	1973–1991
John Price	Labor	Waratah	1984–2007
Peter Primrose	Labor	Camden	1988–1991
Andrew Refshauge	Labor	Marrickville	1983–2005
Robyn Read	Independent	North Shore	1988–1991
Bill Rixon	National	Lismore	1988–1999
Bob Roberts	Liberal	Cessnock	1988–1991
Pat Rogan	Labor	East Hills	1973–1999
Kevin Rozzoli	Liberal	Hawkesbury	1973–2003
Terry Rumble	Labor	Illawarra	1988–1999
Joe Schipp	Liberal	Wagga Wagga	1975–1999
Alby Schultz	Liberal	Burrinjuck	1988–1998
Carl Scully	Labor	Smithfield	1990–2007
Doug Shedden	Labor	Bankstown	1987–1999
Matt Singleton	National	Coffs Harbour	1971–1990
Jim Small	National	Murray	1985–1999
Phillip Smiles	Liberal	Mosman	1984–1993
Russell Smith	Liberal	Bega	1988–2003
George Souris	National	Upper Hunter	1988–2015
Andrew Tink	Liberal	Eastwood	1988–2007
John Turner	National	Myall Lakes	1988–2011
Barrie Unsworth	Labor	Rockdale	1986–1991
Allan Walsh	Labor	Maitland	1981–1991
Robert Webster	National	Goulburn	1984–1991
Ivan Welsh	Independent	Swansea	1988–1991
Garry West	National	Orange	1976–1996
Paul Whelan	Labor	Ashfield	1976–2003
Phil White	Liberal	Earlwood	1988–1991
Roger Wotton	National	Castlereagh	1968–1971, 1973–1991
Michael Yabsley	Liberal	Vaucluse	1984–1988, 1988–1994
Kim Yeadon	Labor	Granville	1990–2007
Guy Yeomans	Liberal	Hurstville	1984–1991
Paul Zammit	Liberal	Strathfield	1984–1996

== See also ==
- First Greiner ministry
- Results of the 1988 New South Wales state election (Legislative Assembly)
- Candidates of the 1988 New South Wales state election
