= Candidates of the 1988 New South Wales state election =

This is a list of candidates for the 1988 New South Wales state election. The election was held on 19 March 1988.

== Retiring Members ==
=== Labor ===
- Peter Cox MLA (Auburn)
- Pat Hills MLA (Elizabeth)
- Ron Mulock MLA (St Marys)
- Ernie Quinn MLA (Wentworthville)
- Arthur Wade MLA (Newcastle)
- Marie Fisher MLC
- Clive Healey MLC
- Norm King MLC
- Joe Thompson MLC

=== Liberal ===
- Jim Clough MLA (Eastwood)
- Greg Percival MLC
- Peter Philips MLC

=== National ===
- Col Fisher MLA (Upper Hunter)

=== Independent ===
- Bruce Duncan MLA (Lismore)
- Toby MacDiarmid MLC – elected as National

== Legislative Assembly ==
Sitting members are shown in bold text. Successful candidates are highlighted in the relevant colour. Where there is possible confusion, an asterisk (*) is also used.

Electorate	Held by	Labor candidate	Coalition candidate	Democrats candidate	Other candidates
Albury	Labor	**Harold Mair**	Ian Glachan* (Lib); Mervyn McIntosh (Nat)		
Ashfield	Labor	**Paul Whelan**	Kevin O'Reilly (Lib)	Peter Hennessy	Sheena Hendley (Ind); Anne Leembruggen (Ind); John Shanahan (EFF)
Auburn	Labor	Peter Nagle	Virginia Schrader (Lib)		John Hadchiti (EFF); Terrence Keegan (EFF)
Ballina	National	Thomas Mooney	Don Page (Nat)	Ivor Brown	Di Edwards (Ind)
Balmain	Labor	**Peter Crawford**	Geoffrey Courtney (Lib)	William Cole	Dawn Fraser* (Ind); Larry Hand (CI); Jane Ward (Ind); Patricia Webster (Ind)
Bankstown	Labor	**Doug Shedden**	Bob Young (Lib)		Kevin Ryan (Ind)
Barwon	National	Edward Stubbins	**Wal Murray** (Nat)		Ross Provis (Ind)
Bass Hill	Labor	Bill Lovelee	**Michael Owen** (Lib)		Ernest Archer (Ind); Norm Axford (EFF)
Bathurst	Labor	**Mick Clough**	David Berry* (Lib); Claud Wilson (Nat)	Irene Langdon	
Bega	Liberal	Robert Ware	Ronald Ferguson (Nat); Russell Smith* (Lib)	John Nicholson	Richard Roberts (Ind)
Blacktown	Labor	**John Aquilina**	Allan Green (Lib)		
Bligh	Liberal	Ross Aubrey	**Michael Yabsley** (Lib)	Joseph Zingarelli	Clover Moore* (Ind); Bruce Thompson (CTA)
Blue Mountains	Labor	**Bob Debus**	Barry Morris (Lib)	Bruce Forbes	
Broken Hill	Labor	**Bill Beckroge**	David Atkins (Lib); Mark Olson (Nat)		
Burragorang	Labor	**Ian McManus**	Pam Down (Lib)		
Burrinjuck	Labor	**Terry Sheahan**	Alby Schultz* (Lib); Richard Wood (Nat)		
Cabramatta	Labor	**John Newman**	Maria Heggie (Lib)		Duy Nguyen-Quang (Ind); Ted Oldfield (Ind)
Camden	Labor	Peter Primrose	John Ryan (Lib)		Ronald Brown (Ind); Michael Dodd (Ind); Gordon Fetterplace (EFF); Clive Sheerin (Ind); Beville Varidel (CTA); Simon Wilson (Ind)
Campbelltown	Labor	**Michael Knight**	Richard Lewis (Lib)		Jeremy Finch (Ind); Leslie Patterson (EFF); Cheryl Routley (Ind)
Canterbury	Labor	**Kevin Moss**	Paul Ritchie (Lib)		Dorothy Costa (SPA); Victoria Papadakis (EFF)
Carlingford	Liberal	Jenifer Klugman	Wayne Merton (Lib)		
Castlereagh	National	Michael Williams	**Roger Wotton** (Nat)	Peter Lyons	
Cessnock	Labor	**Stan Neilly**	Bob Roberts* (Lib); Desmond Snelgrove (Nat)		
Charlestown	Labor	**Richard Face**	Judith Lloyd (Lib)		Brian Carling (Ind)
Clarence	National	William Day	**Ian Causley** (Nat)		
Coffs Harbour	National	Terrence Hancock	**Matt Singleton** (Nat)	Norma Pederson	
Coogee	Labor	**Michael Cleary**	Margaret Martin (Lib)	Laurence Gration	John Buchanan (Ind); Stephen Muller (Ind)
Cronulla	Liberal	Thomas Brownlow	**Malcolm Kerr** (Lib)		Carol Provan (Ind)
Davidson	Liberal	Ray Graham	**Terry Metherell** (Lib)		Julie Sutton (Ind)
Drummoyne	Labor	**John Murray**	Janis Kleinig (Lib)	James Farrell	Jane Adam (Ind); Peter Gronow (Ind); Peter Woods (Ind)
Dubbo	National	Graham Mantova	**Gerry Peacocke** (Nat)		
Earlwood	Labor	**Ken Gabb**	Phil White (Lib)		
East Hills	Labor	**Pat Rogan**	Peter Carver (Lib)		
Eastwood	Liberal	Colleen Logan	Andrew Tink (Lib)	Christopher Dunkerley	
Fairfield	Labor	**Geoff Irwin**	Joe Morizzi (Lib)	Christine Jarvis	Allan Gore (Ind)
Georges River	Labor	**Frank Walker**	Terry Griffiths (Lib)		Beverley Giegerl (Ind); Brian Meyer (Ind); William Pickering (Ind)
Gladesville	Labor	**Rodney Cavalier**	Ivan Petch (Lib)		Mick Lardelli (Ind); Hugh Pitty (NDP)
Gordon	Liberal	Simon Jeans	**Tim Moore** (Lib)	Fiona Richardson	
Gosford	Labor	Anthony Sansom	Chris Hartcher (Lib)	Gary Chestnut	John Anderson (CTA)
Goulburn	National	Roger Lucas	**Robert Webster** (Nat)		
Granville	Labor	**Laurie Ferguson**	Michel Bolgoff		Keith Barron (CTA)
Hawkesbury	Liberal	Lenore Craven	**Kevin Rozzoli** (Lib)		
Heathcote	Labor	Peter Presdee	Allan Andrews (Lib)	Arthur Snow	Jack Pendlebury (Ind)
Heffron	Labor	**Laurie Brereton**	Bernadette Hamilton (Lib)		Barry Devine (Ind)
Hornsby	Liberal	Alan Wells	**Neil Pickard** (Lib)		Michael Voorbij (Ind)
Hurstville	Liberal	Robert McClelland	**Guy Yeomans** (Lib)		Joan Loew (Ind)
Illawarra	Labor	Terry Rumble	Dennis Owen (Lib)		Violet Knowles (CTA); **George Petersen** (IWP)
Keira	Labor	Col Markham	Ian Brown (Lib)		Patricia Franks (Ind); Giles Pickford (Ind)
Kiama	Labor	**Bob Harrison**	Kevin Baker (Lib)		
Kogarah	Labor	**Brian Langton**	Stephen Milgate (Lib)		Anne Field (Ind); Jack Maddox (Ind)
Ku-ring-gai	Liberal	Anna Booth	**Nick Greiner** (Lib)		
Lachlan	National	Leslie Saunders	**Ian Armstrong** (Nat)		
Lake Macquarie	Labor	**Merv Hunter**	Val Samuels (Lib)		Walt Edwards (Ind); Ron Fennell (Ind); Bill Jones (Ind)
Lakemba	Labor	**Wes Davoren**	Robert Batton (Lib)		Saleh Almaleh (Ind); Mohamad Arja (Ind); Mohamad El Sadik (EFF); Murray Peterson (CTA)
Lane Cove	Liberal	Gary Stainton	**John Dowd** (Lib)		
Lismore	National	Kenneth Gallen	Bill Rixon (Nat)	Stanley Gibbs	Jon Axtens (Ind)
Liverpool	Labor	**George Paciullo**	Margaret Brock (Lib)		
Londonderry	Labor	Paul Gibson	Geoffrey Saunders (Lib)		Desmond Wilson (Ind)
Macquarie Fields	Labor	**Stan Knowles**	Frank Calabro (Lib)	Peter Stephens	Leslie Short (Ind); Peter Perkins (Ind)
Maitland	Labor	**Allan Walsh**	Graham Dunkley (Lib)	Derek McCabe	Rodney Allen (Ind); Kevin Cousins (Ind)
Manly	Liberal	Gregory Smith	**David Hay** (Lib)	Matthew Leigh-Jones	
Manning	National	John Tuite	**Wendy Machin** (Nat)		
Maroubra	Labor	**Bob Carr**	Phillip Abadee (Lib)	Mathew Philips	Robert Tracey (Ind)
Marrickville	Labor	**Andrew Refshauge**	Jack Cassimatis (Lib)	Michael Walsh	Ray Barakat (EFF); James Donovan (SPA)
McKell	Labor	Sandra Nori	Michael Bach (Lib)	Ian Faulks	Christopher Barry (Ind); Margaret Ponting (Ind); Ernest Ridding (Ind); Frank Sartor (Ind); John Sloman (Ind)
Middle Harbour	Liberal	Marilyn Dodkin	**Peter Collins** (Lib)		
Minchinbury	Labor	Gregory Lucas	Anne Cohen (Lib)		Joe Bryant (EFF)
Miranda	Liberal	Anthony Iffland	**Ron Phillips** (Lib)		
Monaro	Labor	**John Akister**	Peter Cochran* (Nat); Chris Handbury (Lib)		
Mosman	Liberal	Catherine Stanhope	**Phillip Smiles** (Lib)		
Mulgoa	Labor	Tony Aquilina	Douglas Hayne (Lib)		David Collier (Ind)
Murray	National	Bernard Kelly	**Jim Small** (Nat)		
Murrumbidgee	National	Terence Allen	**Adrian Cruickshank** (Nat)		
Murwillumbah	National	James McCaughey	**Don Beck** (Nat)		Angus Pearson (Ind)
Myall Lakes	National	Andrew Baker	John Turner (Nat)	Amelia Newman	Knox Greenaway (Ind)
Newcastle	Labor	Denis Nichols	Ashley Saunders (Lib)		Margaret Henry (Ind); George Keegan* (Ind)
Northcott	Liberal	John Drew	**Bruce Baird** (Lib)		
Northern Tablelands	National	Kenneth McClenaghan	**Ray Chappell** (Nat)	Anthony Lawarik	
North Shore	Independent	Peter Blakey	Jillian Skinner (Lib)		Mary Day (Ind); **Ted Mack*** (Ind)
Orange	National	Trevor Jaeger	**Garry West** (Nat)		
Parramatta	Labor	**Barry Wilde**	John Books (Lib)	Rodney Levett	
Peats	Labor	**Tony Doyle**	Dennis Swadling (Lib)		Patricia Harrison (Ind)
Penrith	Labor	**Peter Anderson**	Guy Matheson (Lib)		Scott Duffus (Ind); Brian Grigg (CTA); Ian Perry (Ind)
Pittwater	Liberal	Anthony Britt	**Jim Longley** (Lib)	Graeme MacLennan	Eric Green (Ind); Ronald Jamieson (Ind)
Port Macquarie	National	John Murphy	**Bruce Jeffery** (Nat)		
Port Stephens	Labor	Bob Martin	Bob Scott (Lib)		Arthur Dalton (Ind); George Perrin (Ind)
Riverstone	Labor	**Richard Amery**	Kenneth Jessup (Lib)		
Rockdale	Labor	**Barrie Unsworth**	Bob Gemmell (Lib)		Robert Routledge (Ind); Ian Yates (Ind)
Ryde	Labor	**Garry McIlwaine**	Michael Photios (Lib)	Robert Springett	
Seven Hills	Labor	**Bob Christie**	Leonard Robinson (Lib)		Kathleen Cridland (Ind); Russell Dickens (Ind)
Smithfield	Labor	**Janice Crosio**	Glenn Ford (Lib)		
South Coast	Independent	Robyn Drysdale	Graeme Hurst (Lib)		Peter Burge (CTA); **John Hatton*** (Ind)
Southern Highlands	Liberal	Nigel Watkin	**John Fahey**	Gregory Butler	Thomas Gair (Ind)
Strathfield	Liberal	Mark Lennon	**Paul Zammit** (Lib)	Marjorie Woodman	
Sutherland	Labor	**Maurie Keane**	Chris Downy (Lib)		Jean Manuel (Ind)
Swansea	Labor	**Don Bowman**	Linda Donovan (Lib)	Shane Simpson	Ivan Welsh (Ind)
Tamworth	National	Christine Robertson	**Noel Park** (Nat)	Ivan Bielefeld	
The Entrance	Labor	**Brian McGowan**	Bob Graham (Lib)		
The Hills	Liberal	Susan Deane	**Fred Caterson** (Lib)		
Upper Hunter	National	Colleen Green	George Souris (Nat)		
Vaucluse	Liberal	Beverley Crane	**Ray Aston** (Lib)		
Wagga Wagga	Liberal	Geoffrey Burch	**Joe Schipp** (Lib)		
Wakehurst	Liberal	Tom Webster	**John Booth** (Lib)		Michael Pawley (Ind)
Wallsend	Labor	**Ken Booth**	Peter Wilson (Lib)		
Waratah	Labor	**John Price**	Milton Caine (Lib)		
Waverley	Labor	**Ernie Page**	Sally Betts (Lib)	Heather Meers	
Wentworthville	Labor	Pam Allan	Gregory Hooper (Lib)	William Utterson	Allan Ezzy (Ind); Manny Poularas (Ind)
Wollongong	Labor	**Laurie Kelly**	John Masters (Lib)		**Frank Arkell*** (Ind); Graham Roberts (IWP)
Wyong	Labor	**Harry Moore**	Ian Crook (Lib)		

== Legislative Council ==
Sitting members are shown in bold text. Tickets that elected at least one MLC are highlighted in the relevant colour. Successful candidates are identified by an asterisk (*).

Labor candidates	Coalition candidates	Democrats candidates	CTA candidates	Community candidates	EFF candidates
1. **Deirdre Grusovin***; 2. Ian Macdonald*; 3. **Jim Kaldis***; 4. Paul O'Grady*; 5. **Michael Egan***; 6. Andy Manson*; 7. **Dorothy Isaksen**; 8. **Tony Kelly**; 9. Ron Cunningham; 10. George Thompson	1. **Virginia Chadwick*** (Lib); 2. **Bob Rowland Smith*** (Nat); 3. Marlene Goldsmith* (Lib); 4. Brian Pezzutti* (Lib); 5. Duncan Gay* (Nat); 6. Stephen Mutch* (Lib); 7. Helen Sham-Ho* (Lib); 8. Michael Barnes (Lib); 9. Bruce Rowley (Nat); 10. Carol Raye (Lib)	1. Richard Jones*; 2. Ray Griffiths; 3. Rod Bennison	1. Elaine Nile*; 2. Kevin Hume; 3. Patricia Judge; 4. William Bird; 5. Percy Everingham	1. Jack Mundey; 2. Stacey Miers; 3. William Whiley	1. Joe Kanan; 2. Vince White; 3. Jack Moffitt; 4. Geoffrey Sutton; 5. Patrick Lever; 6. Jane Abbott; 7. Peter Catts
NDP candidates	Humanist candidates	Environment candidates	Aboriginal candidates	Defence candidates	Marijuana candidates
1. Colin Charlton; 2. Dennis Wyatt	1. Vito Radice; 2. Noel Whitaker	1. Milo Dunphy; 2. Christine Townend; 3. Alice Oppen	1. Mildred Ingram; 2. Anthony Ammatto; 3. Aubry Phillips	1. Rowley McMahon; 2. David Herd	1. Macciza MacPherson; 2. Nick Brash
Ungrouped candidates					
Michael Smith; Carlos Dutra; Phillip Winchester; John Butt					

== See also ==
- Members of the New South Wales Legislative Assembly, 1988–1991
- Members of the New South Wales Legislative Council, 1988–1991
