= Results of the 1988 New South Wales Legislative Assembly election =

State election for New South Wales, Australia in March 1988

Party	Votes	%	+/–	Seats	+/–
Labor	1,233,612	38.48	▼10.27	43	▼13
Liberal	1,147,613	35.80	▲3.62	39	▲16
National	440,482	13.74	▲2.90	20	▲5
Independents	261,719	8.16	▲3.08	7	▲3
Democrats	58,163	1.81	▼1.03	0	0
Independent EFF	39,194	1.22	New	0	New
Call to Australia	14,205	0.44	▲0.37	0	0
Illawarra Workers Party	6,755	0.21	New	0	New
Socialist	2,717	0.08	▼0.05	0	0
Nuclear Disarmament	1,064	0.03	New	0	New
Total	3,205,524	100.00	–	109	–
Valid votes	3,205,524	98.05			
Invalid/blank votes	63,870	1.95	▲0.84		
Total votes	3,269,394	100.00	–		
Registered voters/turnout	3,541,447	92.32	▲1.07		
Two-party-preferred
Liberal/National Coalition	1,725,936	55.96	▲8.4		
Labor	1,358,049	44.04	▼8.4		
Total	3,083,985	100.00	–		

This is a list of electoral district results for the 1988 New South Wales state election.

== Results by Electoral district ==
=== Albury ===
1988 New South Wales state election: Albury
Party	Candidate	Votes	%	±%
Liberal	Ian Glachan	11,930	38.4	−8.5
Labor	Harold Mair	10,716	34.5	−16.4
National	Mervyn McIntosh	8,438	27.1	+27.1
Total formal votes		31,084	98.6	−0.2
Informal votes		450	1.4	+0.2
Turnout		31,534	93.9	
Two-party-preferred result
Liberal	Ian Glachan	18,805	61.7	+13.7
Labor	Harold Mair	11,654	38.3	−13.7
Liberal gain from Labor		Swing	+13.7	

=== Ashfield ===
1988 New South Wales state election: Ashfield
Party	Candidate	Votes	%	±%
Labor	Paul Whelan	11,690	41.9	−16.7
Liberal	Kevin O'Reilly	10,988	39.4	−1.7
Independent	Anne Leembruggen	2,730	9.8	+9.8
Independent EFF	John Shanahan	1,249	4.5	+4.5
Democrats	Peter Hennessy	632	2.3	+2.0
Independent	Sheena Hendley	583	2.1	+2.1
Total formal votes		27,872	94.9	−1.0
Informal votes		1,494	5.1	+1.0
Turnout		29,366	90.5	
Two-party-preferred result
Labor	Paul Whelan	13,225	51.2	−7.6
Liberal	Kevin O'Reilly	12,610	48.8	+7.6
Labor hold		Swing	−7.6	

=== Auburn ===
1988 New South Wales state election: Auburn
Party	Candidate	Votes	%	±%
Labor	Peter Nagle	14,186	48.3	−21.7
Liberal	Virginia Schrader	6,618	22.5	−7.5
Independent EFF	Terrence Keegan	5,661	19.3	+19.3
Independent EFF	John Hadchiti	2,908	9.9	+9.9
Total formal votes		29,373	94.7	−1.2
Informal votes		1,645	5.3	+1.2
Turnout		31,018	94.0	
Two-party-preferred result
Labor	Peter Nagle	16,359	60.7	−9.3
Liberal	Virginia Schrader	10,589	39.3	+9.3
Labor hold		Swing	−9.3	

=== Ballina ===
1988 New South Wales state election: Ballina
Party	Candidate	Votes	%	±%
National	Don Page	18,022	61.5	+42.2
Labor	Thomas Mooney	8,240	28.1	−2.2
Independent	Di Edwards	1,780	6.1	+6.1
Democrats	Ivor Brown	1,262	4.3	+1.7
Total formal votes		29,304	98.1	−0.5
Informal votes		560	1.9	+0.5
Turnout		29,864	93.4	
Two-party-preferred result
National	Don Page	19,465	68.0	+2.4
Labor	Thomas Mooney	9,159	32.0	−2.4
National notional gain from Independent		Swing	N/A	

- The new district of Ballina took in areas from the Lismore, which was held by retiring Independent MP Bruce Duncan.

=== Balmain ===
1988 New South Wales state election: Balmain
Party	Candidate	Votes	%	±%
Labor	Peter Crawford	11,071	39.3	−21.5
Independent	Dawn Fraser	6,381	22.6	+22.6
Liberal	Geoffrey Courtney	5,383	19.1	−4.6
Community Independents	Larry Hand	2,422	8.6	+8.6
Independent	Jane Ward	1,990	7.1	+7.1
Democrats	William Cole	558	2.0	−5.4
Independent	Patricia Webster	370	1.3	+1.3
Total formal votes		28,175	96.3	+0.2
Informal votes		1,091	3.7	−0.2
Turnout		29,266	89.9	
Two-candidate-preferred result
Independent	Dawn Fraser	13,440	51.7	+51.7
Labor	Peter Crawford	12,576	48.3	−21.0
Independent gain from Labor		Swing	+51.7	

=== Bankstown ===
1988 New South Wales state election: Bankstown
Party	Candidate	Votes	%	±%
Labor	Doug Shedden	14,258	49.7	−14.4
Liberal	Bob Young	9,054	31.6	−2.0
Independent	Kevin Ryan	5,364	18.7	+18.7
Total formal votes		28,676	95.7	−0.2
Informal votes		1,285	4.3	+0.2
Turnout		29,961	94.9	
Two-party-preferred result
Labor	Doug Shedden	15,382	59.2	−6.0
Liberal	Bob Young	10,592	40.8	+6.0
Labor hold		Swing	−6.0	

=== Barwon ===
1988 New South Wales state election: Barwon
Party	Candidate	Votes	%	±%
National	Wal Murray	20,314	68.4	+10.2
Labor	Edward Stubbins	6,819	22.9	−11.9
Independent	Ross Provis	2,581	8.7	+8.7
Total formal votes		29,714	98.3	−0.7
Informal votes		529	1.7	+0.7
Turnout		30,243	93.5	
Two-party-preferred result
National	Wal Murray	21,785	74.3	+12.5
Labor	Edward Stubbins	7,543	25.7	−12.5
National hold		Swing	+12.5	

=== Bass Hill ===
1988 New South Wales state election: Bass Hill
Party	Candidate	Votes	%	±%
Labor	Bill Lovelee	14,758	50.1	−16.1
Liberal	Michael Owen	12,062	41.0	+11.8
Independent EFF	Norm Axford	1,777	6.0	+6.0
Independent	Ernest Archer	831	2.8	+2.8
Total formal votes		29,428	96.4	+0.3
Informal votes		1,095	3.6	−0.3
Turnout		30,523	95.5	
Two-party-preferred result
Labor	Bill Lovelee	15,634	54.3	−14.1
Liberal	Michael Owen	13,180	45.7	+14.1
Labor hold		Swing	−14.1	

=== Bathurst ===
1988 New South Wales state election: Bathurst
Party	Candidate	Votes	%	±%
Labor	Mick Clough	12,876	41.5	−13.6
Liberal	David Berry	9,021	29.1	+29.1
National	Claud Wilson	7,060	22.8	−19.5
Democrats	Irene Langdon	2,075	6.7	+4.0
Total formal votes		31,032	98.2	−0.6
Informal votes		584	1.8	+0.6
Turnout		31,616	95.0	
Two-party-preferred result
Liberal	David Berry	15,489	52.2	+52.2
Labor	Mick Clough	14,190	47.8	−9.8
Liberal gain from Labor		Swing	+9.8	

=== Bega ===
1988 New South Wales state election: Bega
Party	Candidate	Votes	%	±%
Liberal	Russell Smith	12,380	39.4	+7.2
National	Ronald Ferguson	6,881	21.9	+14.3
Labor	Robert Ware	6,563	20.9	−15.5
Independent	Richard Roberts	5,235	16.6	+16.6
Democrats	John Nicholson	389	1.2	+1.2
Total formal votes		31,448	98.0	−0.6
Informal votes		637	2.0	+0.6
Turnout		32,085	92.4	
Two-party-preferred result
Liberal	Russell Smith	20,448	68.7	+16.0
Labor	Robert Ware	9,331	31.3	−16.0
Liberal notional hold		Swing	+16.0	

=== Blacktown ===
1988 New South Wales state election: Blacktown
Party	Candidate	Votes	%	±%
Labor	John Aquilina	16,899	59.2	−7.1
Liberal	Allan Green	11,639	40.8	+7.1
Total formal votes		28,538	96.3	−0.2
Informal votes		1,110	3.7	+0.2
Turnout		29,648	93.7	
Labor hold		Swing	−7.1	

=== Bligh ===
1988 New South Wales state election: Bligh
Party	Candidate	Votes	%	±%
Liberal	Michael Yabsley	11,748	44.0	−2.9
Independent	Clover Moore	7,135	26.7	+26.7
Labor	Ross Aubrey	7,112	26.6	−19.1
Democrats	Joseph Zingarelli	415	1.6	−4.8
Call to Australia	Bruce Thompson	293	1.1	+1.1
Total formal votes		26,703	96.6	+0.3
Informal votes		944	3.4	−0.3
Turnout		27,647	85.8	
Two-candidate-preferred result
Independent	Clover Moore	12,748	50.6	+50.6
Liberal	Michael Yabsley	12,431	49.4	−0.8
Independent gain from Liberal		Swing	+50.6	

=== Blue Mountains ===
1988 New South Wales state election: Blue Mountains
Party	Candidate	Votes	%	±%
Liberal	Barry Morris	13,551	45.6	+10.1
Labor	Bob Debus	13,006	43.7	−5.9
Democrats	Bruce Forbes	3,192	10.7	+3.2
Total formal votes		29,749	97.6	−0.6
Informal votes		723	2.4	+0.6
Turnout		30,472	93.5	
Two-party-preferred result
Liberal	Barry Morris	14,701	50.3	+4.9
Labor	Bob Debus	14,503	49.7	−4.9
Liberal gain from Labor		Swing	+4.9	

=== Broken Hill ===
1988 New South Wales state election: Broken Hill
Party	Candidate	Votes	%	±%
Labor	Bill Beckroge	13,111	47.4	−18.0
National	Mark Olson	10,442	37.7	+17.7
Liberal	David Atkins	4,123	14.9	+0.8
Total formal votes		27,676	96.4	−1.4
Informal votes		1,021	3.6	+1.4
Turnout		28,697	92.7	
Two-party-preferred result
Labor	Bill Beckroge	14,022	52.0	−14.9
National	Mark Olson	12,947	48.0	+14.9
Labor hold		Swing	−14.9	

=== Burragorang ===
1988 New South Wales state election: Burragorang
Party	Candidate	Votes	%	±%
Labor	Ian McManus	16,503	56.6	−5.8
Liberal	Pam Down	12,652	43.4	+11.7
Total formal votes		29,155	96.4	−1.0
Informal votes		1,092	3.6	+1.0
Turnout		30,247	94.4	
Labor notional hold		Swing	−8.8	

=== Burrinjuck ===
1988 New South Wales state election: Burrinjuck
Party	Candidate	Votes	%	±%
Labor	Terry Sheahan	12,969	43.2	−10.3
Liberal	Alby Schultz	9,437	31.4	+21.3
National	Richard Wood	7,646	25.4	−8.4
Total formal votes		30,052	98.4	−0.6
Informal votes		498	1.6	+0.6
Turnout		30,550	94.3	
Two-party-preferred result
Liberal	Alby Schultz	15,907	53.7	+53.7
Labor	Terry Sheahan	13,692	46.3	−8.6
Liberal gain from Labor		Swing	+8.6	

=== Cabramatta ===
1988 New South Wales state election: Cabramatta
Party	Candidate	Votes	%	±%
Labor	John Newman	14,548	52.9	−12.0
Liberal	Maria Heggie	11,084	40.3	+5.8
Independent	Duy Nguyen-Quang	963	3.5	+3.5
Independent	Ted Oldfield	924	3.4	+3.4
Total formal votes		27,519	94.4	−1.3
Informal votes		1,639	5.6	+1.3
Turnout		29,158	93.1	
Two-party-preferred result
Labor	John Newman	15,015	56.6	−8.6
Liberal	Maria Heggie	11,503	43.4	+8.6
Labor hold		Swing	−8.6	

=== Camden ===
1988 New South Wales state election: Camden
Party	Candidate	Votes	%	±%
Labor	Peter Primrose	12,363	40.7	−8.1
Liberal	John Ryan	10,334	34.0	−0.5
Independent EFF	Gordon Fetterplace	4,913	16.2	+2.2
Call to Australia	Beville Varidel	1,155	3.8	+3.8
Independent	Michael Dodd	572	1.9	+1.9
Independent	Ronald Brown	397	1.3	+1.3
Independent	Simon Wilson	373	1.2	+1.2
Independent	Clive Sheerin	282	0.9	+0.9
Total formal votes		30,389	96.6	−1.4
Informal votes		1,070	3.4	+1.4
Turnout		31,459	94.2	
Two-party-preferred result
Labor	Peter Primrose	14,111	50.1	−5.7
Liberal	John Ryan	14,080	49.9	+5.7
Labor hold		Swing	−5.7	

=== Campbelltown ===
1988 New South Wales state election: Campbelltown
Party	Candidate	Votes	%	±%
Labor	Michael Knight	13,823	47.8	−6.2
Liberal	Richard Lewis	10,135	35.0	+13.6
Independent EFF	Leslie Patterson	2,892	10.0	+10.0
Independent	Cheryl Routley	1,366	4.7	+4.7
Independent	Jeremy Finch	730	2.5	+2.5
Total formal votes		28,946	96.5	−0.9
Informal votes		1,061	3.5	+0.9
Turnout		30,007	94.1	
Two-party-preferred result
Labor	Michael Knight	15,222	55.7	−9.1
Liberal	Richard Lewis	12,112	44.3	+9.1
Labor hold		Swing	−9.1	

=== Canterbury ===
1988 New South Wales state election: Canterbury
Party	Candidate	Votes	%	±%
Labor	Kevin Moss	13,692	47.7	−20.6
Independent EFF	Victoria Paradakis	7,194	25.0	+25.0
Liberal	Paul Ritchie	6,911	24.1	−7.5
Socialist	Dorothy Costa	923	3.2	+3.2
Total formal votes		28,720	95.3	−0.6
Informal votes		1,417	4.7	+0.6
Turnout		30,137	92.9	
Two-candidate-preferred result
Labor	Kevin Moss	14,527	53.4	−14.9
Independent EFF	Victoria Paradakis	12,678	46.6	+46.6
Labor hold		Swing	−14.9	

=== Carlingford ===
1988 New South Wales state election: Carlingford
Party	Candidate	Votes	%	±%
Liberal	Wayne Merton	20,171	68.2	+9.1
Labor	Jenifer Klugman	9,420	31.8	−1.3
Total formal votes		29,591	96.4	−1.5
Informal votes		1,105	3.6	+1.5
Turnout		30,696	95.5	
Liberal notional hold		Swing	+5.2	

=== Castlereagh ===
1988 New South Wales state election: Castlereagh
Party	Candidate	Votes	%	±%
National	Roger Wotton	19,482	67.0	+11.1
Labor	Michael Williams	7,425	25.6	−13.1
Democrats	Peter Lyons	2,151	7.4	+5.7
Total formal votes		29,058	97.8	−1.1
Informal votes		662	2.2	+1.1
Turnout		29,720	93.1	
Two-party-preferred result
National	Roger Wotton	20,515	71.9	+13.3
Labor	Michael Williams	8,008	28.1	−13.3
National hold		Swing	+13.3	

=== Cessnock ===
1988 New South Wales state election: Cessnock
Party	Candidate	Votes	%	±%
Labor	Stan Neilly	13,987	45.1	−13.8
Liberal	Bob Roberts	10,143	32.7	+18.3
National	Desmond Snelgrove	6,852	22.1	−4.5
Total formal votes		30,982	96.9	−1.2
Informal votes		989	3.1	+1.2
Turnout		31,971	95.8	
Two-party-preferred result
Liberal	Bob Roberts	15,218	50.5	+9.4
Labor	Stan Neilly	14,943	49.5	−9.4
Liberal gain from Labor		Swing	+9.4	

=== Charlestown ===
1988 New South Wales state election: Charlestown
Party	Candidate	Votes	%	±%
Labor	Richard Face	13,013	43.7	−15.4
Liberal	Judith Lloyd	10,374	34.8	−3.5
Independent	Brian Carling	6,420	21.5	+21.5
Total formal votes		29,807	97.4	−0.5
Informal votes		807	2.6	+0.5
Turnout		30,614	95.8	
Two-party-preferred result
Labor	Richard Face	14,571	50.1	−10.5
Liberal	Judith Lloyd	14,508	49.9	+10.5
Labor hold		Swing	−10.5	

=== Clarence ===
1988 New South Wales state election: Clarence
Party	Candidate	Votes	%	±%
National	Ian Causley	19,842	65.0	+13.8
Labor	William Day	10,681	35.0	−8.3
Total formal votes		30,523	97.8	−1.1
Informal votes		687	2.2	+1.1
Turnout		31,210	94.0	
National hold		Swing	+11.3	

=== Coffs Harbour ===
1988 New South Wales state election: Coffs Harbour
Party	Candidate	Votes	%	±%
National	Matt Singleton	19,748	67.3	+5.7
Labor	Terrence Hancock	7,085	24.1	−14.3
Democrats	Norma Pederson	2,527	8.6	+8.6
Total formal votes		29,360	97.8	−0.7
Informal votes		664	2.2	+0.7
Turnout		30,024	93.5	
Two-party-preferred result
National	Matt Singleton	20,482	71.4	+9.9
Labor	Terrence Hancock	8,210	28.6	−9.9
National hold		Swing	+9.9	

=== Coogee ===
1988 New South Wales state election: Coogee
Party	Candidate	Votes	%	±%
Labor	Michael Cleary	11,739	42.1	−10.4
Liberal	Margaret Martin	11,416	41.0	+0.3
Independent	John Buchanan	3,568	12.8	+12.8
Democrats	Laurence Gration	877	3.1	−3.3
Independent	Stephen Muller	269	1.0	+1.0
Total formal votes		27,869	96.7	−0.7
Informal votes		948	3.3	+0.7
Turnout		28,817	91.5	
Two-party-preferred result
Labor	Michael Cleary	13,484	51.2	−5.4
Liberal	Margaret Martin	12,855	48.8	+5.4
Labor hold		Swing	−5.4	

=== Cronulla ===
1988 New South Wales state election: Cronulla
Party	Candidate	Votes	%	±%
Liberal	Malcolm Kerr	15,632	52.7	+2.2
Labor	Thomas Brownlow	8,649	29.2	−20.4
Independent	Carol Provan	5,381	18.1	+18.1
Total formal votes		29,662	97.7	−0.7
Informal votes		706	2.3	+0.7
Turnout		30,368	94.7	
Two-party-preferred result
Liberal	Malcolm Kerr	17,147	61.6	+11.1
Labor	Thomas Brownlow	10,694	38.4	−11.1
Liberal hold		Swing	+11.1	

=== Davidson ===
1988 New South Wales state election: Davidson
Party	Candidate	Votes	%	±%
Liberal	Terry Metherell	18,327	61.3	−0.3
Independent	Julie Sutton	5,836	19.5	+19.5
Labor	Ray Graham	5,715	19.1	−14.0
Total formal votes		29,878	97.2	−0.9
Informal votes		851	2.8	+0.9
Turnout		30,729	94.3	
Two-candidate-preferred result
Liberal	Terry Metherell	18,610	64.0	−0.1
Independent	Julie Sutton	10,468	36.0	+36.0
Liberal hold		Swing	−0.1	

=== Drummoyne ===
1988 New South Wales state election: Drummoyne
Party	Candidate	Votes	%	±%
Labor	John Murray	12,406	41.6	−17.3
Liberal	Janis Kleinig	12,367	41.4	+0.4
Independent	Peter Woods	2,460	8.2	+8.2
Independent	Jane Adam	2,033	6.8	+6.8
Democrats	James Farrell	433	1.5	+1.4
Independent	Peter Gronow	158	0.5	+0.5
Total formal votes		29,857	95.9	−0.9
Informal votes		1,276	4.1	+0.9
Turnout		31,133	95.0	
Two-party-preferred result
Labor	John Murray	14,403	52.1	−6.8
Liberal	Janis Kleinig	13,265	47.9	+6.8
Labor hold		Swing	−6.8	

=== Dubbo ===
1988 New South Wales state election: Dubbo
Party	Candidate	Votes	%	±%
National	Gerry Peacocke	21,335	71.3	+6.7
Labor	Graham Mantova	8,567	28.7	−6.7
Total formal votes		29,902	97.8	−0.7
Informal votes		660	2.2	+0.7
Turnout		30,562	95.3	
National hold		Swing	+6.7	

=== Earlwood ===
1988 New South Wales state election: Earlwood
Party	Candidate	Votes	%	±%
Liberal	Phil White	15,528	51.3	+8.5
Labor	Ken Gabb	14,764	48.7	−5.7
Total formal votes		30,292	95.7	−1.5
Informal votes		1,353	4.3	+1.5
Turnout		31,645	95.6	
Liberal gain from Labor		Swing	+7.2	

=== East Hills ===
1988 New South Wales state election: East Hills
Party	Candidate	Votes	%	±%
Labor	Pat Rogan	16,747	57.4	−5.4
Liberal	Peter Carver	12,425	42.6	+11.6
Total formal votes		29,172	96.4	−1.2
Informal votes		1,093	3.6	+1.2
Turnout		30,265	96.2	
Labor hold		Swing	−8.6	

=== Eastwood ===
1988 New South Wales state election: Eastwood
Party	Candidate	Votes	%	±%
Liberal	Andrew Tink	18,660	63.3	+3.6
Labor	Colleen Logan	7,881	26.7	−5.2
Democrats	Christopher Dunkerley	2,958	10.0	+1.6
Total formal votes		29,499	97.1	−1.1
Informal votes		877	2.9	+1.1
Turnout		30,376	93.9	
Two-party-preferred result
Liberal	Andrew Tink	19,635	67.6	+3.1
Labor	Colleen Logan	9,400	32.4	−3.1
Liberal hold		Swing	+3.1	

=== Fairfield ===
1988 New South Wales state election: Fairfield
Party	Candidate	Votes	%	±%
Labor	Geoff Irwin	13,840	48.4	−16.7
Liberal	Joe Morizzi	11,492	40.2	+8.6
Democrats	Christine Jarvis	1,940	6.8	+6.8
Independent	Allan Gore	1,344	4.7	+4.7
Total formal votes		28,616	94.4	−1.5
Informal votes		1,711	5.6	+1.5
Turnout		30,327	92.7	
Two-party-preferred result
Labor	Geoff Irwin	14,719	53.9	−13.2
Liberal	Joe Morizzi	12,594	46.1	+13.2
Labor hold		Swing	−13.2	

=== Georges River ===
1988 New South Wales state election: Georges River
Party	Candidate	Votes	%	±%
Labor	Frank Walker	12,615	41.9	−14.1
Liberal	Terry Griffiths	12,018	39.9	−4.2
Independent	William Pickering	4,162	13.8	+13.8
Independent	Beverley Giergerl	1,051	3.5	+3.5
Independent	Brian Meyer	287	1.0	+1.0
Total formal votes		30,133	97.4	−0.1
Informal votes		820	2.6	+0.1
Turnout		30,953	96.5	
Two-party-preferred result
Liberal	Terry Griffiths	15,087	52.1	+8.0
Labor	Frank Walker	13,883	47.9	−8.0
Liberal gain from Labor		Swing	+8.0	

=== Gladesville ===
1988 New South Wales state election: Gladesville
Party	Candidate	Votes	%	±%
Labor	Rodney Cavalier	12,027	40.4	−7.2
Liberal	Ivan Petch	11,970	40.2	+3.4
Independent	Mick Lardelli	4,686	15.8	+5.8
Nuclear Disarmament	Hugh Pitty	1,064	3.6	+3.6
Total formal votes		29,747	96.7	−0.8
Informal votes		1,013	3.3	+0.8
Turnout		30,760	94.2	
Two-party-preferred result
Liberal	Ivan Petch	15,254	53.0	+8.3
Labor	Rodney Cavalier	13,549	47.0	−8.3
Liberal gain from Labor		Swing	+8.3	

=== Gordon ===
1988 New South Wales state election: Gordon
Party	Candidate	Votes	%	±%
Liberal	Tim Moore	22,986	77.9	+0.3
Labor	Simon Jeans	3,719	12.6	−4.7
Democrats	Fiona Richardson	2,784	9.4	+4.4
Total formal votes		29,489	97.5	−0.5
Informal votes		762	2.5	+0.5
Turnout		30,251	93.8	
Two-party-preferred result
Liberal	Tim Moore	23,764	82.9	+2.6
Labor	Simon Jeans	4,885	17.1	−2.6
Liberal hold		Swing	+2.6	

=== Gosford ===
1988 New South Wales state election: Gosford
Party	Candidate	Votes	%	±%
Liberal	Chris Hartcher	16,589	50.2	+19.8
Labor	Anthony Sansom	11,922	36.1	−9.5
Call to Australia	John Anderson	2,690	8.1	+8.1
Democrats	Gary Chestnut	1,845	5.6	0.0
Total formal votes		33,046	97.2	−1.2
Informal votes		938	2.8	+1.2
Turnout		33,984	95.1	
Two-party-preferred result
Liberal	Chris Hartcher	18,507	57.8	+8.7
Labor	Anthony Sansom	13,485	42.2	−8.7
Liberal gain from Labor		Swing	+8.7	

=== Goulburn ===
1988 New South Wales state election: Goulburn
Party	Candidate	Votes	%	±%
National	Robert Webster	20,606	69.3	+16.8
Labor	Roger Lucas	9,144	30.7	−13.2
Total formal votes		29,750	97.6	−1.2
Informal votes		745	2.4	+1.2
Turnout		30,495	95.0	
National hold		Swing	+15.2	

=== Granville ===
1988 New South Wales state election: Granville
Party	Candidate	Votes	%	±%
Labor	Laurie Ferguson	16,724	56.8	−8.7
Liberal	Michel Bolgoff	9,707	33.0	+3.0
Call to Australia	Keith Barron	2,998	10.2	+10.2
Total formal votes		29,429	94.9	−1.2
Informal votes		1,566	5.1	+1.2
Turnout		30,995	94.4	
Two-party-preferred result
Labor	Laurie Ferguson	17,394	60.9	−7.0
Liberal	Michel Bolgoff	11,153	39.1	+7.0
Labor hold		Swing	−7.0	

=== Hawkesbury ===
1988 New South Wales state election: Hawkesbury
Party	Candidate	Votes	%	±%
Liberal	Kevin Rozzoli	21,419	72.1	+0.7
Labor	Lenore Craven	8,292	27.9	−0.7
Total formal votes		29,711	96.7	−0.9
Informal votes		1,018	3.3	+0.9
Turnout		30,729	93.4	
Liberal hold		Swing	+0.7	

=== Heathcote ===
1988 New South Wales state election: Heathcote
Party	Candidate	Votes	%	±%
Liberal	Allan Andrews	14,863	47.0	+6.0
Labor	Peter Presdee	12,434	39.3	−11.9
Independent	Jack Pendlebury	2,558	8.1	+8.1
Democrats	Arthur Snow	1,783	5.6	−2.3
Total formal votes		31,638	97.5	−0.5
Informal votes		804	2.5	+0.5
Turnout		32,442	96.2	
Two-party-preferred result
Liberal	Allan Andrews	15,844	51.8	+6.9
Labor	Peter Presdee	14,718	48.2	−6.9
Liberal gain from Labor		Swing	+6.9	

=== Heffron ===
1988 New South Wales state election: Heffron
Party	Candidate	Votes	%	±%
Labor	Laurie Brereton	15,759	56.2	−9.4
Liberal	Bernadette Hamilton	9,924	35.4	+0.9
Independent	Barry Devine	2,377	8.5	+8.5
Total formal votes		28,060	95.4	−0.8
Informal votes		1,366	4.6	+0.8
Turnout		29,426	91.5	
Two-party-preferred result
Labor	Laurie Brereton	16,109	59.2	−6.4
Liberal	Bernadette Hamilton	11,119	40.8	+6.4
Labor hold		Swing	−6.4	

=== Hornsby ===
1988 New South Wales state election: Hornsby
Party	Candidate	Votes	%	±%
Liberal	Neil Pickard	18,591	61.5	+4.0
Labor	Alan Wells	9,664	32.0	−6.1
Independent	Michael Voorbij	1,951	6.5	+6.5
Total formal votes		30,206	97.2	−1.1
Informal votes		873	2.8	+1.1
Turnout		31,079	94.2	
Two-party-preferred result
Liberal	Neil Pickard	19,259	64.7	+5.0
Labor	Alan Wells	10,529	35.3	−5.0
Liberal hold		Swing	+5.0	

=== Hurstville ===
1988 New South Wales state election: Hurstville
Party	Candidate	Votes	%	±%
Liberal	Guy Yeomans	16,226	54.0	+3.6
Labor	Robert McClelland	11,315	37.7	−11.9
Independent	Joan Loew	2,487	8.3	+8.3
Total formal votes		30,028	97.3	−0.4
Informal votes		820	2.7	+0.4
Turnout		30,848	94.6	
Two-party-preferred result
Liberal	Guy Yeomans	16,766	56.6	+6.2
Labor	Robert McClelland	12,831	43.4	−6.2
Liberal hold		Swing	+6.2	

=== Illawarra ===
1988 New South Wales state election: Illawarra
Party	Candidate	Votes	%	±%
Labor	Terry Rumble	12,241	42.5	−21.4
Liberal	Dennis Owen	9,852	34.2	+6.0
Illawarra Workers	George Petersen	4,727	16.4	+16.4
Call to Australia	Violet Knowles	1,956	6.8	+6.8
Total formal votes		28,776	95.6	−1.8
Informal votes		1,340	4.4	+1.8
Turnout		30,116	95.2	
Two-party-preferred result
Labor	Terry Rumble	14,026	54.4	−13.6
Liberal	Dennis Owen	11,738	45.6	+13.6
Labor hold		Swing	−13.6	

=== Keira ===
1988 New South Wales state election: Keira
Party	Candidate	Votes	%	±%
Labor	Col Markham	11,285	38.9	−17.9
Liberal	Ian Brown	10,082	34.7	+7.1
Independent	Patricia Franks	3,928	13.5	+13.5
Independent	Giles Pickford	3,740	12.9	+12.9
Total formal votes		29,035	96.7	−0.7
Informal votes		981	3.3	+0.7
Turnout		30,016	94.5	
Two-party-preferred result
Labor	Col Markham	13,247	50.8	−12.4
Liberal	Ian Brown	12,837	49.2	+12.4
Labor notional hold		Swing	−12.4	

=== Kiama ===
1988 New South Wales state election: Kiama
Party	Candidate	Votes	%	±%
Labor	Bob Harrison	18,122	61.4	−1.7
Liberal	Kevin Baker	11,408	38.6	+1.7
Total formal votes		29,530	96.5	−1.5
Informal votes		1,080	3.5	+1.5
Turnout		30,610	94.6	
Labor hold		Swing	−1.7	

=== Kogarah ===
1988 New South Wales state election: Kogarah
Party	Candidate	Votes	%	±%
Labor	Brian Langton	13,033	44.4	−8.8
Liberal	Stephen Milgate	12,840	43.7	+2.7
Independent	Anne Field	2,663	9.1	+9.1
Independent	Jack Maddox	831	2.8	+2.8
Total formal votes		29,367	96.4	−0.9
Informal votes		1,086	3.6	+0.9
Turnout		30,453	94.3	
Two-party-preferred result
Labor	Brian Langton	14,738	52.2	−4.2
Liberal	Stephen Milgate	13,509	47.8	+4.2
Labor hold		Swing	−4.2	

=== Ku-ring-gai ===
1988 New South Wales state election: Ku-ring-gai
Party	Candidate	Votes	%	±%
Liberal	Nick Greiner	23,879	79.7	+3.5
Labor	Anna Booth	6,097	20.3	+2.6
Total formal votes		29,976	97.7	−0.8
Informal votes		718	2.3	+0.8
Turnout		30,694	93.5	
Liberal hold		Swing	+0.3	

=== Lachlan ===
1988 New South Wales state election: Lachlan
Party	Candidate	Votes	%	±%
National	Ian Armstrong	21,451	73.6	+10.0
Labor	Leslie Saunders	7,687	26.4	−7.6
Total formal votes		29,138	97.9	−0.9
Informal votes		624	2.1	+0.9
Turnout		29,762	94.7	
National hold		Swing	+8.3	

=== Lake Macquarie ===
1988 New South Wales state election: Lake Macquarie
Party	Candidate	Votes	%	±%
Labor	Merv Hunter	12,260	40.4	−21.2
Liberal	Val Samuels	7,131	23.5	−6.9
Independent	Bill Jones	6,306	20.8	+20.8
Independent	Walt Edwards	3,169	10.4	+10.4
Independent	Ron Fennell	1,510	5.0	+5.0
Total formal votes		30,376	97.5	−0.4
Informal votes		777	2.5	+0.4
Turnout		31,153	94.7	
Two-party-preferred result
Labor	Merv Hunter	15,089	56.4	−9.3
Liberal	Val Samuels	11,648	43.6	+9.3
Labor hold		Swing	−9.3	

=== Lakemba ===
1988 New South Wales state election: Lakemba
Party	Candidate	Votes	%	±%
Labor	Wes Davoren	12,041	43.9	−17.0
Liberal	Robert Batton	10,301	37.6	−1.4
Call to Australia	Murray Peterson	1,902	6.9	+6.9
Independent	Mohamed Arja	1,545	5.6	+5.6
Independent EFF	Mohamed El Sadik	1,058	3.9	+3.9
Independent	Saleh Almaleh	564	2.1	+2.1
Total formal votes		27,411	93.5	−2.2
Informal votes		1,895	6.5	+2.2
Turnout		29,306	92.6	
Two-party-preferred result
Labor	Wes Davoren	13,173	52.6	−8.4
Liberal	Robert Batton	11,860	47.4	+8.4
Labor hold		Swing	−8.4	

=== Lane Cove ===
1988 New South Wales state election: Lane Cove
Party	Candidate	Votes	%	±%
Liberal	John Dowd	20,871	72.6	+7.4
Labor	Gary Stainton	7,886	27.4	−0.6
Total formal votes		28,757	96.7	−1.4
Informal votes		980	3.3	+1.4
Turnout		29,737	92.2	
Liberal hold		Swing	+3.9	

=== Lismore ===
1988 New South Wales state election: Lismore
Party	Candidate	Votes	%	±%
National	Bill Rixon	19,493	65.0	+47.0
Labor	Kenneth Gallen	7,664	25.6	−3.5
Democrats	Stanley Gibbs	2,093	7.0	+5.5
Independent	Jon Axtens	719	2.4	+2.4
Total formal votes		29,969	97.9	−0.9
Informal votes		644	2.1	+0.9
Turnout		30,613	94.2	
Two-party-preferred result
National	Bill Rixon	20,387	69.9	+0.1
Labor	Kenneth Gallen	8,782	30.1	−0.1
National gain from Independent		Swing	N/A	

=== Liverpool ===
1988 New South Wales state election: Liverpool
Party	Candidate	Votes	%	±%
Labor	George Paciullo	17,024	64.1	−4.2
Liberal	Margaret Brock	9,550	35.9	+10.2
Total formal votes		26,574	95.4	−0.9
Informal votes		1,292	4.6	+0.9
Turnout		27,866	92.2	
Labor hold		Swing	−7.3	

=== Londonderry ===
1988 New South Wales state election: Londonderry
Party	Candidate	Votes	%	±%
Labor	Paul Gibson	12,651	47.1	−11.2
Liberal	Geoffrey Saunders	10,074	37.5	−3.1
Independent	Desmond Wilson	4,136	15.4	+15.4
Total formal votes		26,861	94.5	−1.8
Informal votes		1,573	5.5	+1.8
Turnout		28,434	92.3	
Two-party-preferred result
Labor	Paul Gibson	13,330	53.0	−5.9
Liberal	Geoffrey Saunders	11,799	47.0	+5.9
Labor notional hold		Swing	−5.9	

=== Macquarie Fields ===
1988 New South Wales state election: Macquarie Fields
Party	Candidate	Votes	%	±%
Labor	Stan Knowles	13,248	45.4	−18.4
Liberal	Frank Calabro	10,248	35.1	−0.7
Independent	Leslie Short	2,548	8.7	+8.7
Democrats	Peter Stephens	1,748	6.0	+5.9
Independent	Peter Perkins	1,415	4.8	+4.8
Total formal votes		29,207	94.8	−1.5
Informal votes		1,596	5.2	+1.5
Turnout		30,803	91.2	
Two-party-preferred result
Labor	Stan Knowles	14,860	54.9	−9.1
Liberal	Frank Calabro	12,183	45.1	+9.1
Labor notional hold		Swing	−9.1	

=== Maitland ===
1988 New South Wales state election: Maitland
Party	Candidate	Votes	%	±%
Labor	Alan Walsh	12,759	40.5	−21.7
Liberal	Graham Dunkley	9,985	31.7	+4.4
Independent	Rodney Allen	4,922	15.6	+15.6
Independent	Kevin Cousins	3,319	10.5	+10.5
Democrats	Derek McCabe	510	1.6	+1.6
Total formal votes		31,495	97.5	−1.0
Informal votes		803	2.5	+1.0
Turnout		32,298	95.7	
Two-party-preferred result
Labor	Alan Walsh	14,911	50.8	−13.1
Liberal	Graham Dunkley	14,467	49.2	+13.1
Labor hold		Swing	−13.1	

=== Manly ===
1988 New South Wales state election: Manly
Party	Candidate	Votes	%	±%
Liberal	David Hay	16,388	57.6	+7.0
Labor	Gregory Smith	9,686	34.1	−7.6
Democrats	Matthew Leigh-Jones	2,367	8.3	+5.1
Total formal votes		28,441	96.9	−0.8
Informal votes		903	3.1	+0.8
Turnout		29,344	92.0	
Two-party-preferred result
Liberal	David Hay	17,227	62.2	+7.7
Labor	Gregory Smith	10,466	37.8	−7.7
Liberal hold		Swing	+7.7	

=== Manning ===
1988 New South Wales state election: Manning
Party	Candidate	Votes	%	±%
National	Wendy Machin	23,735	73.9	+20.2
Labor	John Tuite	8,391	26.1	−9.1
Total formal votes		32,126	97.3	−0.5
Informal votes		896	2.7	+0.5
Turnout		33,022	95.0	
National notional hold		Swing	+12.4	

=== Maroubra ===
1988 New South Wales state election: Maroubra
Party	Candidate	Votes	%	±%
Labor	Bob Carr	15,895	54.7	−8.1
Liberal	Phillip Abadee	10,498	36.1	−0.8
Democrats	Mathew Phillips	1,804	6.2	+6.0
Independent	Robert Tracey	866	3.0	+3.0
Total formal votes		29,063	96.3	−0.3
Informal votes		1,103	3.7	+0.3
Turnout		30,166	92.5	
Two-party-preferred result
Labor	Bob Carr	16,852	60.4	−2.6
Liberal	Phillip Abadee	11,055	39.6	+2.6
Labor hold		Swing	−2.6	

=== Marrickville ===
1988 New South Wales state election: Marrickville
Party	Candidate	Votes	%	±%
Labor	Andrew Refshauge	13,080	47.7	−18.5
Liberal	Jack Cassimatis	7,364	26.9	+4.4
Democrats	Michael Walsh	3,521	12.9	+1.5
Socialist	James Donovan	1,794	6.5	+6.5
Independent EFF	Ray Barakat	1,639	6.0	+6.0
Total formal votes		27,398	93.2	−1.8
Informal votes		1,986	6.8	+1.8
Turnout		29,384	89.5	
Two-party-preferred result
Labor	Andrew Refshauge	16,046	65.5	−7.2
Liberal	Jack Cassimatis	8,443	34.5	+7.2
Labor hold		Swing	−7.2	

=== McKell ===
1988 New South Wales state election: McKell
Party	Candidate	Votes	%	±%
Labor	Sandra Nori	13,004	50.2	−8.8
Independent	Frank Sartor	6,075	23.5	+23.5
Liberal	Michael Bach	4,609	17.8	−0.3
Democrats	Ian Faulks	1,173	4.5	−2.9
Independent	Christopher Barry	272	1.0	+1.0
Independent	Margaret Ponting	263	1.0	+1.0
Independent	John Sloman	260	1.0	+1.0
Independent	Ernest Ridding	250	1.0	+1.0
Total formal votes		25,906	95.7	−0.2
Informal votes		1,155	4.3	+0.2
Turnout		27,061	86.2	
Two-candidate-preferred result
Labor	Sandra Nori	13,583	56.6	−15.6
Independent	Frank Sartor	10,420	43.4	+43.4
Labor notional hold		Swing	−15.6	

=== Middle Harbour ===
1988 New South Wales state election: Middle Harbour
Party	Candidate	Votes	%	±%
Liberal	Peter Collins	20,147	71.2	+5.2
Labor	Marilyn Dodkin	8,161	28.8	−1.1
Total formal votes		28,308	96.4	−1.4
Informal votes		1,061	3.6	+1.4
Turnout		29,369	93.4	
Liberal notional hold		Swing	+3.2	

=== Minchinbury ===
1988 New South Wales state election: Minchinbury
Party	Candidate	Votes	%	±%
Liberal	Anne Cohen	12,417	40.0	+2.1
Labor	Gregory Lucas	12,008	38.6	−19.9
Independent EFF	Joe Bryant	6,652	21.4	+21.4
Total formal votes		31,077	96.1	−1.0
Informal votes		1,271	3.9	+1.0
Turnout		32,348	94.2	
Two-party-preferred result
Liberal	Anne Cohen	15,469	52.5	+12.9
Labor	Gregory Lucas	13,996	47.5	−12.9
Liberal notional gain from Labor		Swing	+12.9	

=== Miranda ===
1988 New South Wales state election: Miranda
Party	Candidate	Votes	%	±%
Liberal	Ron Phillips	18,577	61.5	+11.3
Labor	Anthony Iffland	11,623	38.5	−8.5
Total formal votes		30,200	96.8	−1.5
Informal votes		997	3.2	+1.5
Turnout		31,197	95.2	
Liberal hold		Swing	+9.9	

=== Monaro ===
1988 New South Wales state election: Monaro
Party	Candidate	Votes	%	±%
Labor	John Akister	12,399	41.5	−15.6
National	Peter Cochran	9,403	31.5	+10.5
Liberal	Chris Handbury	8,048	27.0	+6.1
Total formal votes		29,850	97.4	−0.4
Informal votes		809	2.6	+0.4
Turnout		30,659	90.8	
Two-party-preferred result
National	Peter Cochran	15,703	53.9	+11.9
Labor	John Akister	13,416	46.1	−11.9
National gain from Labor		Swing	+11.9	

=== Mosman ===
1988 New South Wales state election: Mosman
Party	Candidate	Votes	%	±%
Liberal	Phillip Smiles	21,084	73.9	+16.6
Labor	Catherine Stanhope	7,463	26.1	+6.6
Total formal votes		28,547	96.9	−1.5
Informal votes		924	3.1	+1.5
Turnout		29,471	90.7	
Liberal hold		Swing	+4.6	

=== Mulgoa ===
1988 New South Wales state election: Mulgoa
Party	Candidate	Votes	%	±%
Labor	Tony Aquilina	14,689	52.0	−11.8
Liberal	Douglas Hayne	11,573	40.9	+12.7
Independent	David Collier	2,009	7.1	+7.1
Total formal votes		28,271	95.4	−1.9
Informal votes		1,348	4.6	+1.9
Turnout		29,619	94.0	
Two-party-preferred result
Labor	Tony Aquilina	15,254	55.5	−12.6
Liberal	Douglas Hayne	12,235	44.5	+12.6
Labor notional hold		Swing	−12.6	

=== Murray ===
1988 New South Wales state election: Murray
Party	Candidate	Votes	%	±%
National	Jim Small	22,205	77.0	+9.1
Labor	Bernard Kelly	6,626	23.0	−0.3
Total formal votes		28,831	98.1	−0.4
Informal votes		570	1.9	+0.4
Turnout		29,401	89.4	
National hold		Swing	+4.3	

=== Murrumbidgee ===
1988 New South Wales state election: Murrumbidgee
Party	Candidate	Votes	%	±%
National	Adrian Cruickshank	19,967	68.4	+44.5
Labor	Terence Allen	9,214	31.6	−8.0
Total formal votes		29,181	98.2	−0.6
Informal votes		543	1.8	+0.6
Turnout		29,724	93.0	
National hold		Swing	+17.9	

=== Murwillumbah ===
1988 New South Wales state election: Murwillumbah
Party	Candidate	Votes	%	±%
National	Don Beck	16,687	56.1	+10.7
Labor	James McCaughey	10,847	36.5	−6.6
Independent	Angus Pearson	2,220	7.5	+7.5
Total formal votes		29,754	97.7	−0.5
Informal votes		689	2.3	+0.5
Turnout		30,443	92.9	
Two-party-preferred result
National	Don Beck	17,648	60.1	+9.9
Labor	James McCaughey	11,714	39.9	−9.9
National notional hold		Swing	+9.9	

=== Myall Lakes ===
1988 New South Wales state election: Myall Lakes
Party	Candidate	Votes	%	±%
National	John Turner	16,522	52.6	−2.6
Labor	Andrew Baker	7,119	22.7	−16.3
Independent	Knox Greenaway	5,841	18.6	+18.6
Democrats	Amelia Newman	1,923	6.1	+6.1
Total formal votes		31,405	97.4	−1.0
Informal votes		852	2.6	+1.0
Turnout		32,257	94.9	
Two-party-preferred result
National	John Turner	20,001	69.9	+9.2
Labor	Andrew Baker	8,594	30.1	−9.2
National notional hold		Swing	+9.2	

=== Newcastle ===
1988 New South Wales state election: Newcastle
Party	Candidate	Votes	%	±%
Labor	Denis Nichols	11,074	37.8	−22.1
Independent	George Keegan	9,512	32.5	+32.5
Liberal	Ashley Saunders	5,389	18.4	−13.2
Independent	Margaret Henry	3,307	11.3	+11.3
Total formal votes		29,282	96.9	−0.6
Informal votes		952	3.1	+0.6
Turnout		30,234	93.8	
Two-candidate-preferred result
Independent	George Keegan	15,134	55.3	+55.3
Labor	Denis Nichols	12,229	44.7	−19.8
Independent gain from Labor		Swing	+55.3	

=== Northcott ===
1988 New South Wales state election: Northcott
Party	Candidate	Votes	%	±%
Liberal	Bruce Baird	23,271	76.0	+8.1
Labor	John Drew	7,350	24.0	−1.6
Total formal votes		30,621	96.9	−1.3
Informal votes		988	3.1	+1.3
Turnout		31,609	94.5	
Liberal hold		Swing	+5.0	

=== Northern Tablelands ===
1988 New South Wales state election: Northern Tablelands
Party	Candidate	Votes	%	±%
National	Ray Chappell	19,933	65.8	+15.2
Labor	Kenneth McClenaghan	8,131	26.8	−22.4
Democrats	Anthony Lawarick	2,232	7.4	+7.4
Total formal votes		30,296	97.8	−0.9
Informal votes		673	2.2	+0.9
Turnout		30,969	94.4	
Two-party-preferred result
National	Ray Chappell	20,619	69.0	+18.3
Labor	Kenneth McClenaghan	9,258	31.0	−18.3
National hold		Swing	+18.3	

=== North Shore ===
1988 New South Wales state election: North Shore
Party	Candidate	Votes	%	±%
Independent	Ted Mack	13,684	49.3	+13.3
Liberal	Jillian Skinner	10,283	37.0	−5.2
Labor	Peter Blakey	3,108	11.2	−8.5
Independent	Mary Day	698	2.5	+2.5
Total formal votes		27,773	98.0	−0.1
Informal votes		554	2.0	+0.1
Turnout		28,327	89.1	
Two-candidate-preferred result
Independent	Ted Mack	16,257	59.9	+4.1
Liberal	Jillian Skinner	10,876	40.1	−4.1
Independent hold		Swing	+4.1	

=== Orange ===
1988 New South Wales state election: Orange
Party	Candidate	Votes	%	±%
National	Garry West	22,153	72.5	+13.0
Labor	Trevor Jaeger	8,408	27.5	−13.0
Total formal votes		30,561	97.7	−1.1
Informal votes		727	2.3	+1.1
Turnout		31,288	95.0	
National hold		Swing	+13.0	

=== Parramatta ===
1988 New South Wales state election: Parramatta
Party	Candidate	Votes	%	±%
Liberal	John Books	12,972	47.1	+10.7
Labor	Barry Wilde	12,807	46.5	−3.2
Democrats	Rodney Levett	1,777	6.4	+3.9
Total formal votes		27,556	96.8	+0.1
Informal votes		897	3.2	−0.1
Turnout		28,453	93.4	
Two-party-preferred result
Liberal	John Books	13,743	50.5	+5.9
Labor	Barry Wilde	13,475	49.5	−5.9
Liberal gain from Labor		Swing	+5.9	

=== Peats ===
1988 New South Wales state election: Peats
Party	Candidate	Votes	%	±%
Labor	Tony Doyle	15,223	48.8	−11.6
Liberal	Dennis Swadling	10,568	33.9	+1.2
Independent	Patricia Harrison	5,378	17.3	+17.3
Total formal votes		31,169	97.1	−1.1
Informal votes		942	2.9	+1.1
Turnout		32,111	94.9	
Two-party-preferred result
Labor	Tony Doyle	16,894	57.5	−6.4
Liberal	Dennis Swadling	12,462	42.5	+6.4
Labor hold		Swing	−6.4	

=== Penrith ===
1988 New South Wales state election: Penrith
Party	Candidate	Votes	%	±%
Labor	Peter Anderson	12,650	42.2	−10.7
Liberal	Guy Matheson	12,503	41.7	+5.9
Call to Australia	Brian Grigg	2,147	7.2	+7.2
Independent	Scott Duffus	2,039	6.8	+6.8
Independent	Ian Perry	610	2.0	+2.0
Total formal votes		29,949	96.8	−1.1
Informal votes		994	3.2	+1.1
Turnout		30,943	94.6	
Two-party-preferred result
Liberal	Guy Matheson	14,817	52.2	+10.3
Labor	Peter Anderson	13,571	47.8	−10.3
Liberal gain from Labor		Swing	+10.3	

=== Pittwater ===
1988 New South Wales state election: Pittwater
Party	Candidate	Votes	%	±%
Liberal	Jim Longley	16,952	56.5	−2.2
Independent	Eric Green	7,640	25.5	+25.5
Labor	Anthony Britt	4,280	14.3	−12.8
Democrats	Graeme MacLennan	905	3.0	−1.1
Independent	Ronald Jamieson	235	0.8	+0.8
Total formal votes		30,012	97.1	−0.7
Informal votes		896	2.9	+0.7
Turnout		30,908	92.5	
Two-candidate-preferred result
Liberal	Jim Longley	17,424	60.1	−6.0
Independent	Eric Green	11,559	39.9	+39.9
Liberal hold		Swing	−6.0	

=== Port Macquarie ===
1988 New South Wales state election: Port Macquarie
Party	Candidate	Votes	%	±%
National	Bruce Jeffery	21,036	69.4	+24.9
Labor	John Murphy	9,284	30.6	+0.6
Total formal votes		30,320	97.8	−0.8
Informal votes		692	2.2	+0.8
Turnout		31,012	92.8	
National notional hold		Swing	+7.1	

=== Port Stephens ===
1988 New South Wales state election: Port Stephens
Party	Candidate	Votes	%	±%
Labor	Bob Martin	12,967	42.2	−7.6
Liberal	Bob Scott	12,391	40.4	+10.3
Independent	George Perrin	4,119	13.4	+13.4
Independent	Arthur Dalton	1,227	4.0	+4.0
Total formal votes		30,704	96.6	−1.3
Informal votes		1,072	3.4	+1.3
Turnout		31,776	94.6	
Two-party-preferred result
Labor	Bob Martin	14,235	50.2	−10.2
Liberal	Bob Scott	14,145	49.8	+10.2
Labor notional hold		Swing	−10.2	

=== Riverstone ===
1988 New South Wales state election: Riverstone
Party	Candidate	Votes	%	±%
Labor	Richard Amery	16,648	57.2	−7.1
Liberal	Kenneth Jessup	12,471	42.8	+8.2
Total formal votes		29,119	94.8	−1.2
Informal votes		1,597	5.2	+1.2
Turnout		30,716	92.3	
Labor hold		Swing	−7.6	

=== Rockdale ===
1988 New South Wales state election: Rockdale
Party	Candidate	Votes	%	±%
Labor	Barrie Unsworth	15,793	53.6	−9.6
Liberal	Bob Gemmell	9,878	33.6	−0.5
Independent EFF	Ian Yates	3,251	11.0	+11.0
Independent	Robert Routledge	520	1.8	+1.8
Total formal votes		29,442	96.2	−0.5
Informal votes		1,148	3.8	+0.5
Turnout		30,590	93.6	
Two-party-preferred result
Labor	Barrie Unsworth	16,382	57.0	−7.6
Liberal	Bob Gemmell	12,359	43.0	+7.6
Labor hold		Swing	−7.6	

=== Ryde ===
1988 New South Wales state election: Ryde
Party	Candidate	Votes	%	±%
Labor	Garry McIlwaine	13,253	46.1	−5.3
Liberal	Michael Photios	13,183	45.9	+5.5
Democrats	Robert Springett	2,311	8.0	+0.7
Total formal votes		28,747	97.0	−0.1
Informal votes		876	3.0	+0.1
Turnout		29,623	93.3	
Two-party-preferred result
Liberal	Michael Photios	14,189	50.2	+5.3
Labor	Garry McIlwaine	14,092	49.8	−5.3
Liberal gain from Labor		Swing	+5.3	

=== Seven Hills ===
1988 New South Wales state election: Seven Hills
Party	Candidate	Votes	%	±%
Labor	Bob Christie	12,455	44.7	−15.5
Liberal	Leonard Robinson	9,271	33.3	−6.4
Independent	Russell Dickens	4,165	15.0	+15.0
Independent	Kathleen Cridland	1,944	7.0	+7.0
Total formal votes		27,835	96.5	−0.5
Informal votes		1,024	3.5	+0.5
Turnout		28,859	94.6	
Two-party-preferred result
Labor	Bob Christie	14,054	55.0	−5.2
Liberal	Leonard Robinson	11,504	45.0	+5.2
Labor hold		Swing	−5.2	

=== Smithfield ===
1988 New South Wales state election: Smithfield
Party	Candidate	Votes	%	±%
Labor	Janice Crosio	16,250	60.8	−6.4
Liberal	Glenn Ford	10,468	39.2	+14.5
Total formal votes		26,718	94.5	−1.1
Informal votes		1,549	5.5	+1.1
Turnout		28,267	93.6	
Labor notional hold		Swing	−11.5	

=== South Coast ===
1988 New South Wales state election: South Coast
Party	Candidate	Votes	%	±%
Independent	John Hatton	14,272	46.2	−13.8
Liberal	Graeme Hurst	9,703	31.4	+13.1
Labor	Robyn Drysdale	5,826	18.9	−1.3
Call to Australia	Peter Burge	1,064	3.4	+3.4
Total formal votes		30,865	97.9	−0.7
Informal votes		672	2.1	+0.7
Turnout		31,537	93.1	
Two-candidate-preferred result
Independent	John Hatton	19,426	64.7	−10.2
Liberal	Graeme Hurst	10,582	35.3	+10.2
Independent hold		Swing	−10.2	

=== Southern Highlands ===
1988 New South Wales state election: Southern Highlands
Party	Candidate	Votes	%	±%
Liberal	John Fahey	15,176	51.2	+9.1
Labor	Nigel Watkins	7,110	24.0	−17.6
Independent	Thomas Gair	5,448	18.4	+18.4
Democrats	Gregory Butler	1,899	6.4	+6.4
Total formal votes		29,633	97.0	−1.0
Informal votes		905	3.0	+1.0
Turnout		30,538	94.5	
Two-party-preferred result
Liberal	John Fahey	18,451	66.8	+9.1
Labor	Nigel Watkins	9,171	33.2	−9.1
Liberal notional hold		Swing	+9.1	

=== Strathfield ===
1988 New South Wales state election: Strathfield
Party	Candidate	Votes	%	±%
Liberal	Paul Zammit	16,931	59.6	+7.9
Labor	Mark Lennon	9,729	34.2	−11.5
Democrats	Marjorie Woodman	1,749	6.2	+3.6
Total formal votes		28,409	96.4	−1.0
Informal votes		1,068	3.6	+1.0
Turnout		29,477	93.6	
Two-party-preferred result
Liberal	Paul Zammit	17,486	62.8	+9.7
Labor	Mark Lennon	10,345	37.2	−9.7
Liberal notional hold		Swing	+9.7	

=== Sutherland ===
1988 New South Wales state election: Sutherland
Party	Candidate	Votes	%	±%
Liberal	Chris Downy	14,490	48.3	+5.4
Labor	Maurie Keane	11,875	39.6	−13.4
Independent	Jean Manuel	3,632	12.1	+12.1
Total formal votes		29,997	97.9	−0.2
Informal votes		631	2.1	+0.2
Turnout		30,628	95.7	
Two-party-preferred result
Liberal	Chris Downy	15,476	52.5	+7.6
Labor	Maurie Keane	14,028	47.5	−7.6
Liberal notional gain from Labor		Swing	+7.6	

=== Swansea ===
1988 New South Wales state election: Swansea
Party	Candidate	Votes	%	±%
Independent	Ivan Welsh	12,145	38.7	+38.7
Labor	Don Bowman	12,112	38.6	−23.4
Liberal	Linda Donovan	6,168	19.6	−6.8
Democrats	Shane Simpson	967	3.1	−3.5
Total formal votes		31,392	97.0	−0.5
Informal votes		973	3.0	+0.5
Turnout		32,365	95.7	
Two-candidate-preferred result
Independent	Ivan Welsh	17,631	58.4	+58.4
Labor	Don Bowman	12,545	41.6	−27.1
Independent gain from Labor		Swing	+58.4	

=== Tamworth ===
1988 New South Wales state election: Tamworth
Party	Candidate	Votes	%	±%
National	Noel Park	21,083	70.0	+11.7
Labor	Christine Robertson	6,608	21.9	−12.8
Democrats	Ivan Bielefeld	2,444	8.1	+1.1
Total formal votes		30,135	98.1	−0.8
Informal votes		587	1.9	+0.8
Turnout		30,722	95.5	
Two-party-preferred result
National	Noel Park	22,230	75.4	+13.2
Labor	Christine Robertson	7,255	24.6	−13.2
National hold		Swing	+13.2	

=== The Entrance ===
1988 New South Wales state election: The Entrance
Party	Candidate	Votes	%	±%
Liberal	Bob Graham	16,080	52.0	+21.2
Labor	Brian McGowan	14,852	48.0	−3.7
Total formal votes		30,932	96.7	−1.3
Informal votes		1,069	3.3	+1.3
Turnout		32,001	94.5	
Liberal notional gain from Labor		Swing	+9.9	

=== The Hills ===
1988 New South Wales state election: The Hills
Party	Candidate	Votes	%	±%
Liberal	Fred Caterson	23,459	75.9	+12.7
Labor	Susan Deane	7,458	24.1	+1.3
Total formal votes		30,917	97.2	−0.8
Informal votes		906	2.8	+0.8
Turnout		31,823	94.8	
Liberal hold		Swing	+5.4	

=== Upper Hunter ===
1988 New South Wales state election: Upper Hunter
Party	Candidate	Votes	%	±%
National	George Souris	20,055	67.8	+9.7
Labor	Colleen Green	9,522	32.2	−8.3
Total formal votes		29,577	97.0	−1.9
Informal votes		900	3.0	+1.9
Turnout		30,477	94.0	
National hold		Swing	+9.1	

=== Vaucluse ===
1988 New South Wales state election: Vaucluse
Party	Candidate	Votes	%	±%
Liberal	Ray Aston	20,267	77.2	+4.4
Labor	Beverley Crane	5,982	22.8	−0.4
Total formal votes		26,249	96.4	−0.6
Informal votes		993	3.6	+0.6
Turnout		27,242	89.9	
Liberal hold		Swing	+2.3	

=== Wagga Wagga ===
1988 New South Wales state election: Wagga Wagga
Party	Candidate	Votes	%	±%
Liberal	Joe Schipp	22,085	72.6	+12.2
Labor	Geoffrey Burch	8,321	27.4	−4.3
Total formal votes		30,406	97.9	−0.8
Informal votes		662	2.1	+0.8
Turnout		31,068	90.9	
Liberal hold		Swing	+6.8	

=== Wakehurst ===
1988 New South Wales state election: Wakehurst
Party	Candidate	Votes	%	±%
Liberal	John Booth	15,013	52.2	+2.6
Labor	Tom Webster	10,022	34.9	−10.6
Independent	Michael Pawley	3,717	12.9	+12.9
Total formal votes		28,752	96.3	−1.3
Informal votes		1,090	3.7	+1.3
Turnout		29,842	92.7	
Two-party-preferred result
Liberal	John Booth	16,004	57.5	+5.5
Labor	Tom Webster	11,809	42.5	−5.5
Liberal hold		Swing	+5.5	

=== Wallsend ===
1988 New South Wales state election: Wallsend
Party	Candidate	Votes	%	±%
Labor	Ken Booth	17,651	59.4	−7.1
Liberal	Peter Wilson	12,066	40.6	+8.1
Total formal votes		29,717	96.0	−1.5
Informal votes		1,232	4.0	+1.5
Turnout		30,949	96.0	
Labor hold		Swing	−7.6	

=== Waratah ===
1988 New South Wales state election: Waratah
Party	Candidate	Votes	%	±%
Labor	John Price	17,294	61.4	+7.7
Liberal	Milton Caine	10,863	38.6	+10.7
Total formal votes		28,157	95.8	−2.2
Informal votes		1,245	4.2	+2.2
Turnout		29,402	95.6	
Labor hold		Swing	−3.0	

=== Waverley ===
1988 New South Wales state election: Waverley
Party	Candidate	Votes	%	±%
Labor	Ernie Page	12,360	46.2	−3.3
Liberal	Sally Betts	12,063	45.1	+4.3
Democrats	Heather Meers	2,315	8.7	+1.8
Total formal votes		26,738	96.9	+0.4
Informal votes		843	3.1	−0.4
Turnout		27,581	90.1	
Two-party-preferred result
Labor	Ernie Page	13,303	50.5	−3.9
Liberal	Sally Betts	13,016	49.5	+3.9
Labor hold		Swing	−3.9	

=== Wentworthville ===
1988 New South Wales state election: Wentworthville
Party	Candidate	Votes	%	±%
Labor	Pam Allan	14,603	47.7	−10.0
Liberal	Gregory Hooper	10,287	33.6	−1.2
Independent	Allan Ezzy	4,476	14.6	+14.6
Independent	Manny Poularas	634	2.1	+2.1
Democrats	William Utterson	604	2.0	−3.0
Total formal votes		30,604	95.9	−0.7
Informal votes		1,314	4.1	+0.7
Turnout		31,918	95.4	
Two-party-preferred result
Labor	Pam Allan	15,681	53.9	−7.6
Liberal	Gregory Hooper	13,428	46.1	+7.6
Labor hold		Swing	−7.6	

=== Wollongong ===
1988 New South Wales state election: Wollongong
Party	Candidate	Votes	%	±%
Independent	Frank Arkell	12,909	44.5	+10.8
Labor	Laurie Kelly	11,263	38.8	−13.1
Liberal	John Masters	2,804	9.7	−1.3
Illawarra Workers	Graham Roberts	2,028	7.0	+7.0
Total formal votes		29,004	95.5	−0.2
Informal votes		1,372	4.5	+0.2
Turnout		30,376	93.2	
Two-candidate-preferred result
Independent	Frank Arkell	15,560	55.5	+10.2
Labor	Laurie Kelly	12,488	44.5	−10.2
Independent hold		Swing	+10.2	

=== Wyong ===
1988 New South Wales state election: Wyong
Party	Candidate	Votes	%	±%
Labor	Harry Moore	16,494	54.5	−3.9
Liberal	Ian Crook	13,754	45.5	+14.0
Total formal votes		30,248	96.5	−1.1
Informal votes		1,107	3.5	+1.1
Turnout		31,355	94.2	
Labor notional hold		Swing	−8.9	

== See also ==
- Results of the 1988 New South Wales state election (Legislative Council)
- Candidates of the 1988 New South Wales state election
- Members of the New South Wales Legislative Assembly, 1988–1991
