= Electoral results for the district of Coffs Harbour =

Election results for Coffs Harbour, New South Wales, Australia

Coffs Harbour, an electoral district of the Legislative Assembly in the Australian state of New South Wales, was created in 1981 and has always been held by the National party.

== Members for Coffs Harbour ==
Election	Member	Party
1981	Matt Singleton	National
1984	Matt Singleton	National
1988	Matt Singleton	National
1990 by	Andrew Fraser	National
1991	Andrew Fraser	National
1995	Andrew Fraser	National
1999	Andrew Fraser	National
2003	Andrew Fraser	National
2007	Andrew Fraser	National
2011	Andrew Fraser	National
2015	Andrew Fraser	National
2019	Gurmesh Singh	National
2023	Gurmesh Singh	National

== Election results ==
=== Elections in the 2020s ===
==== 2023 ====
2023 New South Wales state election: Coffs Harbour
Party	Candidate	Votes	%	±%
National	Gurmesh Singh	25,319	51.43	+8.61
Labor	Tony Judge	10,263	20.85	+3.16
Independent	Sally Townley	5,978	12.14	−5.25
Legalise Cannabis	Tihema Elliston	2,917	5.93	+5.93
Greens	Tim Nott	2,814	5.72	−0.81
Animal Justice	Kellie Pearce	1,096	2.23	−0.47
Sustainable Australia	Ruth Cully	842	1.71	+1.71
Total formal votes		49,229	97.20	+0.95
Informal votes		1,416	2.80	−0.95
Turnout		50,645	87.58	−1.29
Two-party-preferred result
National	Gurmesh Singh	27,458	63.24	+2.47
Labor	Tony Judge	15,958	36.76	−2.47
National hold		Swing	+2.47	

=== Elections in the 2010s ===
==== 2019 ====
2019 New South Wales state election: Coffs Harbour
Party	Candidate	Votes	%	±%
National	Gurmesh Singh	20,268	42.82	−11.76
Labor	Tony Judge	8,371	17.69	−8.21
Independent	Sally Townley	8,247	17.42	+17.42
Shooters, Fishers, Farmers	Stuart Davidson	3,405	7.19	+7.19
Greens	Jonathan Cassell	3,090	6.53	−7.03
Liberal Democrats	Gregory Renet	1,542	3.26	+3.26
Animal Justice	Robyn Marchant	1,278	2.70	+2.70
Independent	Ann Leonard	1,132	2.39	+2.39
Total formal votes		47,333	96.25	−0.53
Informal votes		1,846	3.75	+0.53
Turnout		49,179	88.87	−0.01
Two-party-preferred result
National	Gurmesh Singh	22,799	60.77	−3.53
Labor	Tony Judge	14,717	39.23	+3.53
Two-candidate-preferred result
National	Gurmesh Singh	22,375	60.30	−4.00
Independent	Sally Townley	14,730	39.70	+39.70
National hold				

==== 2015 ====
2015 New South Wales state election: Coffs Harbour
Party	Candidate	Votes	%	±%
National	Andrew Fraser	24,652	54.6	−11.3
Labor	June Smith	11,698	25.9	+11.7
Greens	Craig Christie	6,126	13.6	+3.1
Christian Democrats	Ian Sutherland	1,958	4.3	+0.7
No Land Tax	Annette Guerry	733	1.6	+1.6
Total formal votes		45,167	96.8	−0.3
Informal votes		1,503	3.2	+0.3
Turnout		46,670	88.9	−0.5
Two-party-preferred result
National	Andrew Fraser	26,184	64.3	−13.0
Labor	June Smith	14,537	35.7	+13.0
National hold		Swing	−13.0	

==== 2011 ====
2011 New South Wales state election: Coffs Harbour
Party	Candidate	Votes	%	±%
National	Andrew Fraser	29,798	66.1	+14.1
Labor	David Quinn	6,392	14.2	−6.5
Greens	Rodney Degens	4,749	10.5	+3.1
Independent	Paul Templeton	2,575	5.7	+5.7
Christian Democrats	Deborah Lions	1,591	3.5	−0.2
Total formal votes		45,105	97.5	−0.8
Informal votes		1,140	2.5	+0.8
Turnout		46,245	91.3	
Two-party-preferred result
National	Andrew Fraser	31,956	77.2	+9.6
Labor	David Quinn	9,421	22.8	−9.6
National hold		Swing	+9.6	

=== Elections in the 2000s ===
==== 2007 ====
2007 New South Wales state election: Coffs Harbour
Party	Candidate	Votes	%	±%
National	Andrew Fraser	22,351	52.0	+11.8
Labor	David Kennedy	8,898	20.7	−1.0
Independent	Keith Rhoades	6,421	14.9	+4.9
Greens	Rodney Degens	3,205	7.5	+1.5
Christian Democrats	Deborah Lions	1,592	3.7	+0.4
AAFI	Gerry Evic	550	1.3	+1.3
Total formal votes		43,017	98.3	+0.4
Informal votes		738	1.7	−0.4
Turnout		43,755	92.3	
Two-party-preferred result
National	Andrew Fraser	24,884	67.6	+5.7
Labor	David Kennedy	11,914	32.4	−5.7
National hold		Swing	+5.7	

==== 2003 ====
2003 New South Wales state election: Coffs Harbour
Party	Candidate	Votes	%	±%
National	Andrew Fraser	16,728	40.4	−5.7
Labor	Pamela Stephenson	7,811	18.9	−11.7
Independent	Jan Strom	7,475	18.1	+18.1
Independent	Keith Rhoades	4,411	10.7	+10.7
Greens	Gabrielle Tindall	2,952	7.1	+3.6
Christian Democrats	Greg Holder	1,417	3.4	+3.4
One Nation	Tenille Burston	487	1.2	−10.1
Independent	Evalds Erglis	109	0.3	−0.4
Total formal votes		41,390	98.0	−0.3
Informal votes		854	2.0	+0.3
Turnout		42,244	92.4	
Notional two-party-preferred count
National	Andrew Fraser	19,781	64.3	+6.0
Labor	Pamela Stephenson	10,974	35.7	−6.0
Two-candidate-preferred result
National	Andrew Fraser	18,817	56.9	−1.4
Independent	Jan Strom	14,263	43.1	+43.1
National hold		Swing	−1.4	

=== Elections in the 1990s ===
==== 1999 ====
1999 New South Wales state election: Coffs Harbour
Party	Candidate	Votes	%	±%
National	Andrew Fraser	18,043	46.1	−7.0
Labor	Alph Williams	11,970	30.6	+0.3
One Nation	George Gardiner	4,409	11.3	+11.3
Democrats	Mark Spencer	2,361	6.0	+6.0
Greens	Chris Cairns	1,369	3.5	−1.9
Earthsave	Chris Backman	362	0.9	+0.9
Independent	Evalds Erglis	271	0.7	+0.0
AAFI	Frederick Ansted	229	0.6	+0.6
Non-Custodial Parents	Horst Sommer	128	0.3	+0.3
Total formal votes		39,142	98.3	+1.5
Informal votes		692	1.7	−1.5
Turnout		39,834	93.3	
Two-party-preferred result
National	Andrew Fraser	19,749	58.3	−0.6
Labor	Alph Williams	14,129	41.7	+0.6
National hold		Swing	−0.6	

==== 1995 ====
1995 New South Wales state election: Coffs Harbour
Party	Candidate	Votes	%	±%
National	Andrew Fraser	19,296	53.0	+0.5
Labor	Bruce Clarke	11,064	30.4	−5.7
Independent	Sue Dethridge	2,945	8.1	+8.1
Greens	Mark Spencer	1,979	5.4	+5.4
Natural Law	Byron Rigby	500	1.4	+1.4
The Country Party	Ken Field	406	1.1	+1.1
Independent	Evalds Erglis	251	0.7	−0.7
Total formal votes		36,441	96.7	+1.4
Informal votes		1,232	3.3	−1.4
Turnout		37,673	93.9	
Two-party-preferred result
National	Andrew Fraser	20,361	58.7	+1.7
Labor	Bruce Clarke	14,326	41.3	−1.7
National hold		Swing	+1.7	

==== 1991 ====
1991 New South Wales state election: Coffs Harbour
Party	Candidate	Votes	%	±%
National	Andrew Fraser	16,625	52.5	−16.2
Labor	Bruce Clarke	11,434	36.1	+12.3
Democrats	Sue Arnold	2,106	6.7	−0.7
Independent	May Southgate	1,062	3.4	+3.4
Independent	Evalds Erglis	439	1.4	+1.4
Total formal votes		31,666	95.4	−2.5
Informal votes		1,544	4.6	+2.5
Turnout		33,210	93.8	
Two-party-preferred result
National	Andrew Fraser	17,547	57.0	−15.3
Labor	Bruce Clarke	13,263	43.0	+15.3
National hold		Swing	−15.3	

==== 1990 by-election ====
1990 Coffs Harbour by-election Saturday 3 November
Party	Candidate	Votes	%	±%
National	Andrew Fraser	11,393	37.4	−30.0
Labor	Bruce Clarke	9,790	32.1	+8.0
Independent	Lynne Dalton	3,437	11.3	
Independent	Max Dawes	2,501	8.2	
Total formal votes		30,503	98.4	+0.6
Informal votes		507	1.6	−0.6
Turnout		31,010	86.8	−6.7
Two-party-preferred result
National	Andrew Fraser	15,920	55.4	−16.0
Labor	Bruce Clarke	12,823	44.6	+16.0
National hold		Swing	+16.0	

Matt Singleton (National) resigned.

=== Elections in the 1980s ===
==== 1988 ====
1988 New South Wales state election: Coffs Harbour
Party	Candidate	Votes	%	±%
National	Matt Singleton	19,748	67.3	+5.7
Labor	Terrence Hancock	7,085	24.1	−14.3
Democrats	Norma Pederson	2,527	8.6	+8.6
Total formal votes		29,360	97.8	−0.7
Informal votes		664	2.2	+0.7
Turnout		30,024	93.5	
Two-party-preferred result
National	Matt Singleton	20,482	71.4	+9.9
Labor	Terrence Hancock	8,210	28.6	−9.9
National hold		Swing	+9.9	

==== 1984 ====
1984 New South Wales state election: Coffs Harbour
Party	Candidate	Votes	%	±%
National	Matt Singleton	21,873	61.3	+2.0
Labor	Laurence Brown	13,789	38.7	−2.0
Total formal votes		35,662	98.4	+0.2
Informal votes		569	1.6	−0.2
Turnout		36,231	91.8	+0.8
National hold		Swing	+2.0	

==== 1981 ====
1981 New South Wales state election: Coffs Harbour
Party	Candidate	Votes	%	±%
National Country	Matt Singleton	18,375	59.3	−0.8
Labor	Joseph Moran	12,626	40.7	+0.8
Total formal votes		31,001	98.2	
Informal votes		561	1.8	
Turnout		31,562	91.0	
National Country notional hold		Swing	−0.8	

Coffs Harbour was a new district, notionally held by National Country. Matt Singleton (National Country) was the sitting member for Clarence which had become notionally held by Labor due to the redistribution.
