= 1988 Port Stephens state by-election =

Election result for Port Stephens, New South Wales, Australia

A by-election was held for the New South Wales Legislative Assembly electorate of Port Stephens on 5 November 1988 because the Court of Disputed Returns declared that the 1988 Port Stephens election was void because Bob Martin (Labor) handed government cheques to community groups during the campaign and this amounted to electoral bribery.

== Dates ==
Date	Event
19 March 1988	New South Wales state election.
30 May 1988	Bob Scott filed a petition in the Court of Disputed returns.
19 September 1988	1988 Port Stephens election declared void.
17 October 1988	Writ of election issued by the Speaker of the Legislative Assembly and close of electoral rolls.
21 October 1988	Nominations
5 November 1988	Polling day
25 November 1988	Return of writ

== Result ==
1988 Port Stephens by-election Saturday 5 November
Party	Candidate	Votes	%	±%
Labor	Bob Martin (re-elected)	15,953	53.6	+11.4
Liberal	Bob Scott	8,930	30.0	−10.4
Independent	Innes Creighton	4,368	14.7	
Independent	Arthur Dalton	496	1.7	
Total formal votes		29,747	98.1	
Informal votes		581	1.9	
Turnout		30,328	87.0	
Two-party-preferred result
Labor	Bob Martin	17,925	63.0	+12.9
Liberal	Bob Scott	10,521	37.0	−12.9
Labor hold		Swing	+12.9 (Note: Compared to the result at the 1988 election.)	

== See also ==
- Electoral results for the district of Port Stephens
- List of New South Wales state by-elections
