= 1990 Coffs Harbour state by-election =

Election result for Coffs Harbour, New South Wales, Australia

A by-election was held in the state electoral district of Coffs Harbour on 3 November 1990. The by-election was triggered by the resignation of Matt Singleton (National).

== Dates ==
Date	Event
11 September 1990	Matt Singleton resigned.
12 October 1990	Writ of election issued by the Speaker of the Legislative Assembly and close of electoral rolls.
18 October 1990	Day of nomination
3 November 1990	Polling day
23 November 1990	Return of writ

== Result ==
1990 Coffs Harbour by-election Saturday 3 November
Party	Candidate	Votes	%	±%
National	Andrew Fraser	11,393	37.4	−30.0
Labor	Bruce Clarke	9,790	32.1	+8.0
Independent	Lynne Dalton	3,437	11.3	
Independent	Max Dawes	2,501	8.2	
Total formal votes		30,503	98.4	+0.6
Informal votes		507	1.6	−0.6
Turnout		31,010	86.8	−6.7
Two-party-preferred result
National	Andrew Fraser	15,920	55.4	−16.0
Labor	Bruce Clarke	12,823	44.6	+16.0
National hold		Swing	+16.0	

== See also ==
- Electoral results for the district of Coffs Harbour
- List of New South Wales state by-elections
