= Kate Washington =

Australian politician and lawyer

The Honourable Kate Washington MP
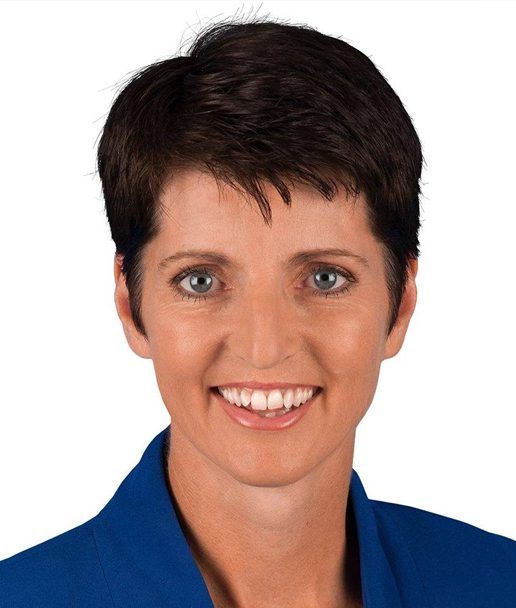

Minister for Families and Communities
- Incumbent
- Assumed office 5 April 2023
- Premier: Chris Minns
- Preceded by: Natasha Maclaren-Jones

Minister for Disability Inclusion
- Incumbent
- Assumed office 5 April 2023
- Premier: Chris Minns
- Preceded by: Natasha Maclaren-Jones (as Minister for Disability Services)

Member of the New South Wales Legislative Assembly for Port Stephens
- Incumbent
- Assumed office 28 March 2015
- Preceded by: Craig Baumann

Personal details
- Born: 1970 (age 55–56) Wollongong, New South Wales, Australia
- Party: New South Wales Labor Party
- Education: University of Sydney
- Profession: Lawyer
- Website: www.katewashington.com.au

Kate Rebecca Washington (born 1970) is an Australian politician who has served as Minister for Disability Inclusion and Families and Communities in the Minns Government of New South Wales since 2023. She was elected to the New South Wales Legislative Assembly as the member for Port Stephens for the New South Wales Labor Party at the 2015 New South Wales state election.

Before entering parliament, Washington worked as a health lawyer. She has three children and lives in Lemon Tree Passage.

== Political career ==
Washington first contested the seat of Port Stephens for the Labor Party at the 2011 election. She was not elected, with Labor losing the seat after a 12.4-point two-candidate swing against the party. Four years later, she won the seat with a two-candidate swing toward her of 19.5 points. Her electorate office is located in Raymond Terrace. During her first two terms, she served as a member of the Committee on the Health Care Complaints Commission.

In 2016, Jodie Harrison resigned from the Shadow Ministry of Luke Foley. Washington replaced her as Shadow Minister for Early Childhood Education, the Hunter and the Prevention of Domestic Violence and Sexual Assault on 19 January 2016. In a March 2016 reshuffle that occurred following the resignation of Linda Burney, she was replaced as Shadow Minister for Prevention of Domestic Violence and Sexual Assault by Jenny Aitchison but retained the portfolios of Early Childhood Education and the Hunter until the 2019 New South Wales Labor Party leadership election in which Jodi McKay was elected as Leader of the Opposition.

She held the portfolios of Shadow Minister for Environment and Heritage and Shadow Minister for Rural Health from 2019 to 2021 in the McKay shadow ministry. Washington became the Shadow Minister for Family and Community Services and Shadow Minister for Disability Inclusion, following the 2021 New South Wales Labor Party leadership election.

In the 2023 election, Washington retained her seat for a third term with a 13.3-point swing to the Labor Party in the electorate. Following the election she was appointed Minister for Family & Community Services and the Minister for Disability Inclusion in the Minns Labor Government.

Political offices
Preceded by Natasha Maclaren-Jones	Minister for Families and Communities; 2023–present	Incumbent
Preceded by Natasha Maclaren-Jones	Minister for Disability Inclusion; 2023–present	Incumbent
New South Wales Legislative Assembly
Preceded by Craig Baumann	Member for Port Stephens; 2015–present	Incumbent
