= Bob Scott (New South Wales politician) =

Australian politician

Walter Robert "Bob" Scott (born 23 April 1943) is a former Australian politician. He was a Liberal member of the New South Wales Legislative Council from 1974 to 1978.

Scott was born in Maitland and attended Maitland Boys' High School and Morpeth Grammar School. He subsequently became a dairy farmer and salesman with Shortland City Council, before directing a small family company in the area. A member of the Liberal Party, he contested the 1965 and 1968 elections for Gloucester as an Independent, where the Coalition agreement prevented the Liberal Party from endorsing a candidate against the sitting Country member.

In 1974, Scott was elected to the New South Wales Legislative Council, filling a casual vacancy caused by the death of independent MLC Harry Gardiner. He served until the 1978 state election, when the reduction in the council's size led him to lose his place on the Coalition's ticket. In the 1988 state election, he was the Liberal candidate for Port Stephens, losing to Labor candidate Bob Martin by 90 votes. Martin had handed government cheques to community groups during the campaign and Scott filed a petition in the Court of Disputed Returns. Justice Needham held that Martin's conduct amounted to electoral bribery and declared the election void, a result which surprised political observers and politicians. In the subsequent by-election, Martin resoundingly defeated Scott, who has not returned to politics.
