= John Bartlett (Australian politician) =

Australian politician (1949–2008)

John Richard Bartlett (27 July 1949 – 8 February 2008) was an Australian politician, elected as a member of the New South Wales Legislative Assembly.

== Biography ==
Bartlett was educated in the Hunter Region and attended Newcastle Technical High School (now Merewether High School). He was awarded a BA, Dip. Ed and Dip. T.L by the University of Newcastle. He was a Councillor on Port Stephens Council for 16 years, including three years as Mayor, and was a librarian at Nelson Bay High School for 22 years. He was married with three children.

Bartlett represented Port Stephens for the Labor Party from 1999 to 2007. He died on 8 February 2008.

New South Wales Legislative Assembly
Preceded by Bob Martin	Member for Port Stephens; 1999–2007	Succeeded by Craig Baumann
