= Craig Baumann =

Australian politician

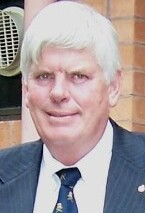
- Baumann in 2012

Member of the New South Wales Parliament for Port Stephens
- In office 24 March 2007 – 6 March 2015
- Preceded by: John Bartlett
- Succeeded by: Kate Washington

Personal details
- Born: Craig Asbjorn Baumann; 30 April 1953 (age 73) Rotterdam, Netherlands
- Party: Liberal (until 2014); Independent (from 2014)
- Spouse: Victoria Baumann
- Children: 3
- Education: University of Sydney
- Occupation: Politician, Businessman
- Profession: Structural Engineer

Craig Asbjorn Baumann (born 30 April 1953) is an Australian politician. He was a member of the New South Wales Legislative Assembly from 2007 to 2015, representing the electorate of Port Stephens. He was elected as a member of the Liberal Party, but resigned to sit as an independent in 2014 following his admission of failing to properly disclose electoral donations in the course of Independent Commission Against Corruption proceedings.

== Early life ==
Baumann was born to Arne and Agnes Baumann in Rotterdam in 1953. With his family, he moved to Australia at a young age and grew up in Strathfield, Sydney. He attended the University of Sydney and gained a Bachelor of Civil Engineering (Structures) in 1975. He then worked in several engineering firms before joining Mambare, a builder of services stations in Sydney. This company soon rebranded as Valley Homes and pivoted to building houses, primarily in the Newcastle and Hunter Valley regions of New South Wales. Baumann eventually became the sole director as well as the owner of Valley Homes.

== Political career ==
Baumann was elected to Port Stephens Shire Council in 1987 and served as Deputy Shire President from 1989 until 1991. Re-elected to Council in 1991, Baumann served as Mayor in 1994. He again was elected to Port Stephens Council in 1999 and 2004 and served as Mayor from 2004 to 2006, when he stood down as Mayor to contest the 2007 election.

Baumann was elected at the 2007 state election. Following two weeks of re-counts, he was elected on a two party preferred margin of 68 votes, making Port Stephens the most marginal electorate in New South Wales. Despite the small margin, Baumann received a 7.3% swing in his favour, and notably this was the first and only time since formation of the electorate in 1988 that the seat had been won by a Liberal Candidate. Before entering state politics, Baumann was mayor of Port Stephens. After the Liberal party entered government at the 2011 election, Baumann was appointed by Premier Barry O’Farrell as Parliamentary Secretary for Regional Planning under Minister Brad Hazzard. In 2014 Premier Mike Baird re-appointed him under Minister Pru Goward.

Following admissions by Baumann, at a hearing of the New South Wales Independent Commission Against Corruption (ICAC) on 12 September 2014, that he had written sham invoices to cover up electoral donations received from developers during his election campaign in 2007, he resigned from the Parliamentary Liberal Party and moved to the crossbench of the Legislative Assembly for the remainder of the 2011-2015 parliamentary term.

With the announcement that the ICAC wouldn't bring down its report on Operation Spicer until after the 2015 state election, Baumann was forced to stand down as a candidate, with Kate Washington gaining the seat for Labor with a large 19.5% swing. The Operation Spicer report was handed down in 2016 and found that all donations Baumann received had been genuine political donations from parties not prohibited from making political donations. However it also found that Baumann had acted to avoid the election funding laws requiring the disclosure of these donations.

== Awards ==
Baumann is a Chartered Professional Engineer, a Fellow of the Institution of Engineers Australia and a Fellow of the Australian Institute of Building. He was awarded a Centenary Medal in 2001 for "outstanding service to the development of the region through membership of the local Council".

Baumann is an Emeritus Mayor of Port Stephens Council.

== Personal life ==
Baumann married Victoria Julie Angus in 1983 and they moved to Medowie in 1985 where they raised 3 sons Angus, Stuart & James.

New South Wales Legislative Assembly
Preceded by John Bartlett	Member for Port Stephens; 2007–2015	Succeeded by Kate Washington
