= Independent EFF =

- Leader: Joe Bryant
- Founded: 1987
- Dissolved: 1999
- Blacktown City Council: 1 / 15 (1987–1996)

Independent EFF (Enterprise, Freedom, Family) was a minor Australian political party that was active between 1987 and 1999. It was unsuccessful in electing candidates.

The party was founded in 1987 by Blacktown Deputy Mayor Joe Bryant, and its positions included reducing workers' compensation, instituting voluntary unionism, and the elimination of unemployment benefits and the flat tax. The party had links to far right groups such as the Australian League of Rights. Party leader Bryant would later resurface as a republican and supporter of Pauline Hanson.
