= Andrew Fraser (New South Wales politician) =

Australian politician

Member of Legislative Assembly of New South Wales
- In office 3 November 1990 – 23 March 2019
- Preceded by: Matt Singleton
- Succeeded by: Gurmesh Singh
- Constituency: Coffs Harbour

Personal details
- Born: 19 December 1952 (age 73) Newcastle, New South Wales
- Party: The Nationals
- Spouse: Kerrie Fraser
- Children: Three
- Occupation: Politician

Andrew Raymond Gordon Fraser (born 19 December 1952), an Australian politician, was a member of the New South Wales Legislative Assembly from 1990 to 2019, representing Coffs Harbour for the Nationals.

Fraser was educated in Newcastle at Kahibah Primary and Whitebridge High Schools. He has worked in finance industry and as an insurance broker and has been the proprietor of a take-away food shop and of a caravan park. He is married with three children.

Fraser is noted for chasing and grabbing then Minister for Roads, Joe Tripodi, on the floor of the House in September 2005, apparently in relation to a lack of funding for the main roads, including the Pacific Highway in Coffs Harbour. The ABC's coverage of the 2007 election included the caption "Andrew Fraser the strangler won." He became deputy leader of the NSW Nationals in March 2007, before he was deposed during a leadership spill in October 2008.

On 3 December 2008, Fraser resigned from the shadow ministry after pushing fellow Nationals MP Katrina Hodgkinson in the Legislative Assembly. Hodgkinson was trying to move Fraser away from a verbal confrontation with Labor MP John Aquilina.

New South Wales Legislative Assembly
Preceded by Matt Singleton	Member for Coffs Harbour; 1990–2019	Succeeded by Gurmesh Singh
Preceded by Alison Megarrity; Grant McBride	Assistant Speaker of the Legislative Assembly; 2011–2019	Succeeded by Mark Coure
Party political offices
Preceded by Don Page	Deputy Leader of the National Party of Australia – NSW; 2007–2008	Succeeded by Adrian Piccoli
