= Electoral district of Coffs Harbour =

State electoral district of New South Wales, Australia

Coffs Harbour New South Wales—Legislative Assembly
- Interactive map of district boundaries from the 2023 state election
- State: New South Wales
- Dates current: 1981–present
- MP: Gurmesh Singh
- Party: National Party
- Namesake: Coffs Harbour
- Electors: 55,338 (2019)
- Area: 1,173.73 km^{2} (453.2 sq mi)
- Demographic: Provincial
Electorates around Coffs Harbour:
Clarence	Clarence	Pacific Ocean
Clarence	Coffs Harbour	Pacific Ocean
Oxley	Oxley	Pacific Ocean

Coffs Harbour is an electoral district of the Legislative Assembly in the Australian state of New South Wales. Since 2019 it has been represented by Gurmesh Singh of the National Party.

The district takes in the entirety of the City of Coffs Harbour and includes the localities of Coffs Harbour, Sawtell, Coramba, Korora Bay, Moonee Beach, Emerald Beach, Woolgoolga, Arrawarra, Corindi Beach and Red Rock.

== Members for Coffs Harbour ==
Member	Party	Period
Matt Singleton	National	1981–1990
Andrew Fraser	National	1990–2019
Gurmesh Singh	National	2019–present

== Election results ==
2023 New South Wales state election: Coffs Harbour
Party	Candidate	Votes	%	±%
National	Gurmesh Singh	25,319	51.43	+8.61
Labor	Tony Judge	10,263	20.85	+3.16
Independent	Sally Townley	5,978	12.14	−5.25
Legalise Cannabis	Tihema Elliston	2,917	5.93	+5.93
Greens	Tim Nott	2,814	5.72	−0.81
Animal Justice	Kellie Pearce	1,096	2.23	−0.47
Sustainable Australia	Ruth Cully	842	1.71	+1.71
Total formal votes		49,229	97.20	+0.95
Informal votes		1,416	2.80	−0.95
Turnout		50,645	87.58	−1.29
Two-party-preferred result
National	Gurmesh Singh	27,458	63.24	+2.47
Labor	Tony Judge	15,958	36.76	−2.47
National hold		Swing	+2.47	
