= Matt Singleton =

Australian politician

Minister for Administrative Services
- In office 25 March 1988 – 24 January 1989
- Preceded by: New ministry
- Succeeded by: Robert Webster

Member of the New South Wales Legislative Assembly for Coffs Harbour
- In office 19 September 1981 – 11 September 1990
- Preceded by: New seat
- Succeeded by: Andrew Fraser

Member of the New South Wales Legislative Assembly for Coffs Harbour
- In office 13 February 1971 – 28 August 1981
- Preceded by: Bill Weiley
- Succeeded by: Don Day

Personal details
- Born: Matthew Singleton; 14 September 1927 (age 98) Coffs Harbour, New South Wales, Australia
- Party: NSW Nationals
- Spouse: Nancy (m. 1955)
- Children: Five
- Occupation: Farmer

Matthew Singleton (born 14 September 1927) is a former Australian politician. He was the Country then National Party member for Clarence from 1971 to 1981 and for Coffs Harbour from 1981 to 1990 in the New South Wales Legislative Assembly. He was also Minister for Administrative Services and Assistant Minister for Transport from 1988 to 1989.

Singleton was born in Coffs Harbour. On 26 November 1955 he was married to Nancy, with whom he has five children. He was a farmer and company director before entering politics, and was chairman of the Bonville Boambee branch of the Country Party from 1957 to 1971, and of the electoral councils for the state seat of Raleigh (1958–70) and the federal seat of Cowper (1958–72). He was also a member of the party's Central Council (1968–72) and Central Executive. He was also active in farming groups as State President of the Junior Farmers of New South Wales (1962–63) and Vice President of the New South Wales Jersey Herd Society.

In 1971, following the retirement of sitting Country Party member Bill Weiley, Singleton was selected as one of two Country Party candidates for the state seat of Clarence. Although outpolled by the Labor Party on the primary vote, the preferences of the second Country candidate and two independents gave him a fairly comfortable victory with 55.11% of the two-party-preferred result. In 1981, Singleton's seat was made notionally Labor and he transferred to the new seat of Coffs Harbour. He served eleven months as Minister for Administrative Services and Assistant Minister for Transport in the Greiner government from 1988 to 1989, before resigning from politics in 1990.

Political offices
New title	Minister for Administrative Services; 1988–1989	Succeeded by Robert Webster
New South Wales Legislative Assembly
Preceded by Bill Weiley	Member for Clarence; 1971–1981	Succeeded by Don Day
New district	Member for Coffs Harbour; 1981–1990	Succeeded by Andrew Fraser
