= Electoral district of Port Stephens =

Port Stephens New South Wales—Legislative Assembly
- Interactive map of district boundaries from the 2023 state election
- State: New South Wales
- Created: 1988
- MP: Kate Washington
- Party: Labor Party
- Namesake: Port Stephens
- Electors: 60,278 (2023)
- Area: 1,285.57 km^{2} (496.4 sq mi)
- Demographic: Provincial
- Coordinates: 32°45′41.3″S 151°44′38.6″E
Electorates around Port Stephens:
Upper Hunter	Myall Lakes	Myall Lakes
Maitland	Port Stephens	Pacific Ocean
Wallsend	Newcastle	Pacific Ocean

Port Stephens is an electoral district of the Legislative Assembly in the Australian state of New South Wales. It is represented by Kate Washington of the Labor Party.

Port Stephens includes most of the Port Stephens Council in the Hunter region (excluding Fern Bay and Fullerton Cove), and parts of the southern Mid-Coast Council in the Mid North Coast region (including Hawks Nest and Tea Gardens).

== History ==
Port Stephens was created in 1988, partly replacing Gloucester.

== Members for Port Stephens ==
Member	Party	Term
Bob Martin	Labor	1988–1999
John Bartlett	Labor	1999–2007
Craig Baumann	Liberal	2007–2014
Craig Baumann	Independent	2014–2015
Kate Washington	Labor	2015–present

== Election results ==
2023 New South Wales state election: Port Stephens
Party	Candidate	Votes	%	±%
Labor	Kate Washington	27,957	53.60	+5.46
Liberal	Nathan Errington	11,883	22.78	−17.14
One Nation	Mark Watson	6,720	12.88	+12.88
Greens	Jordan Jensen	2,511	4.81	+1.01
Animal Justice	Michelle Buckmaster	1,569	3.01	+0.39
Informed Medical Options	Angela Ketas	769	1.47	+1.47
Sustainable Australia	Beverley Jelfs	752	1.44	−0.54
Total formal votes		52,161	97.18	+0.66
Informal votes		1,511	2.82	−0.66
Turnout		53,672	89.04	−2.03
Two-party-preferred result
Labor	Kate Washington	30,777	69.02	+13.27
Liberal	Nathan Errington	13,812	30.98	−13.27
Labor hold		Swing	+13.27	
