= Bob Martin (Australian politician) =

Australian politician

Robert Douglas Martin (born 7 December 1945) is a former Australian politician. He was the Labor Party member for Port Stephens in the New South Wales Legislative Assembly from 1988 to 1999.

Martin was born in Sydney to Douglas and Beryl, and attended McDonald Upper Primary School and Hurlestone Agricultural High School, graduating in 1962. He then attended Hawkesbury Agricultural College and graduated with a Diploma in Agriculture in 1965. He worked for the Department of Agriculture at Alstonville, Dareton and Bathurst, before moving to Griffith in 1969. On 11 January that year he married Margaret Eady from Murwillumbah, a primary school teacher. They had two children. He also joined the Labor Party. In 1970 he was employed with New South Wales State Fisheries, and managed the Port Stephens centre until 1988.

In 1988, Martin was selected as the Labor candidate for the new seat of Port Stephens. He won the seat by less than 100 votes. Defeated Liberal candidate Walter Scott went to the Court of Disputed Returns, obtaining a judgement that government cheques handed to community groups by Martin counted as electoral bribery. This decision was met with astonishment by all sides of politics, and Martin won the by-election resoundingly with a 13% margin. In 1991, boundary changes made his seat notionally Liberal-held, but he was elected with a 10% margin nevertheless. He was appointed Minister for Mineral Resources and Minister for Fisheries in the Carr Government when it was elected in 1995. Martin retired from politics in 1999.

New South Wales Legislative Assembly
Preceded by New seat	Member for Port Stephens; 1988–1999	Succeeded by John Bartlett
