= Candidates of the 2015 New South Wales state election =

This article provides details on candidates for the 2015 New South Wales state election, held on 28 March 2015.

== Retiring members ==
=== Labor ===
- Richard Amery MLA (Mount Druitt) — announced 11 August 2014
- Cherie Burton MLA (Kogarah) — announced 6 November 2013
- Barry Collier MLA (Miranda) — announced 17 October 2014
- Robert Furolo MLA (Lakemba) — announced 8 August 2014
- Andrew McDonald MLA (Macquarie Fields) — announced 18 September 2014
- Barbara Perry MP (Auburn) — announced 7 January 2015
- Nathan Rees MLA (Toongabbie) — announced 28 March 2014
- Carmel Tebbutt MLA (Marrickville) — announced 3 November 2013
- Amanda Fazio MLC — announced 30 June 2014

=== Liberal ===
- Barry O'Farrell MLA (Ku-ring-gai) — announced 24 November 2014
- Robyn Parker MLA (Maitland) — announced 16 October 2014
- Greg Smith MLA (Epping) — announced 16 July 2014
- Charlie Lynn MLC — announced 2014

=== National ===
- Don Page MLA (Ballina) — announced 22 April 2014
- George Souris MLA (Upper Hunter) — announced 27 September 2014
- Andrew Stoner MLA (Oxley) — announced 15 October 2014
- Jenny Gardiner MLC — announced 16 February 2014

=== Independent ===
- Bart Bassett MLA (Londonderry) — elected as Liberal, did not recontest
- Craig Baumann MLA (Port Stephens) — elected as Liberal, announced 10 December 2014
- Chris Hartcher MLA (Terrigal) — elected as Liberal, announced 15 October 2014
- Chris Spence MLA (The Entrance) — elected as Liberal, announced 10 June 2014
- Darren Webber MLA (Wyong) — elected as Liberal, announced 10 June 2014
- Marie Ficarra MLC — elected as Liberal, delivered valedictory 19 November 2014

== Legislative Assembly ==
Sitting members are shown in bold text. Successful candidates are highlighted in the relevant colour. Where there is possible confusion, an asterisk (*) is also used.

Electorate	Held by	Labor candidate	Coalition candidate	Greens candidate	CDP candidate	Other candidates
Albury	Liberal	Ross Jackson	**Greg Aplin** (Lib)	Niloufer King	Kym Wade	John Marra (NLT)
Auburn	Labor	Luke Foley	Ronney Oueik (Lib)	Malikeh Michels	Raema Walker	Kays Ahmed (NLT); Paul Garrard (Ind)
Ballina	National	Paul Spooner	Kris Beavis (Nat)	Tamara Smith	Vyvyan Scott	Matthew Hartley (Ind); Jeff Johnson (Ind); Greg Zylber (NLT)
Balmain	Greens	Verity Firth	Lyndon Gannon (Lib)	**Jamie Parker**	Rhonda Avasalu	Gordon Brown (NLT); Patrick Fogarty (ACP); Michelle Nielsen (AJP)
Bankstown	Labor	**Tania Mihailuk**	George Zakhia (Lib)	Luke Poliszcuk	Juliat Nasr	Oscar Grenfell (-); Jeremy Lawrance (NLT)
Barwon	National	Craig Ashby	**Kevin Humphries** (Nat)	Cameron Jones	Ian Hutchinson	Rohan Boehm (Ind); Nella Lopreiato (NLT)
Bathurst	National	Cass Coleman	**Paul Toole** (Nat)	Tracey Carpenter	Narelle Rigby	Tom Cripps (NLT)
Baulkham Hills	Liberal	Ryan Tracey	**David Elliott** (Lib)	Alice Suttie	Kaia Thorpe	Neil Holden (NLT)
Bega	Liberal	Leanne Atkinson	**Andrew Constance** (Lib)	Margaret Perger	Ursula Bennett	Clyde Archard (NLT)
Blacktown	Labor	**John Robertson**	Raman Bhalla (Lib)	David Bate	Meena Hanna	Julia Cacciotti (NLT)
Blue Mountains	Liberal	Trish Doyle	**Roza Sage** (Lib)	Alandra Tasire	Tony Piper	Mark Harrison (Ind); Gianna Maiorana (NLT)
Cabramatta	Labor	**Nick Lalich**	Maria Diep (Lib)	Bill Cashman	Don Modarelli	Eddie Canto (NLT)
Camden	Liberal	Cindy Cagney	**Chris Patterson** (Lib)	Danica Sajn	Colin Broadbridge	Mario Tabone (NLT)
Campbelltown	Liberal	Greg Warren	**Bryan Doyle** (Lib)	Ben Moroney	Sarah Ramsay	Chris Stephandellis (NLT)
Canterbury	Labor	**Linda Burney**	Nomiky Panayiotakis (Lib)	Linda Eisler	Tony Issa	Tony Maiorana (NLT)
Castle Hill	Liberal	Matt Ritchie	**Ray Williams** (Lib)	Michael Bellstedt	Muriel Sultana	Anna Stevis (NLT)
Cessnock	Labor	**Clayton Barr**	Jessica Price-Purnell (Nat)	Lindy Williams	Julie Johnson	Domenic Lopreiato (NLT)
Charlestown	Labor	**Jodie Harrison**	Jason Pauling (Lib)	Jane Oakley	Brian Tucker	Luke Arms (Ind); Arjay Martin (Ind); Tania Morvillo (NLT)
Clarence	National	Trent Gilbert	**Chris Gulaptis** (Nat)	Janet Cavanaugh	Carol Ordish	Joe Lopreiato (NLT); Debrah Novak (Ind); Bryan Robins (Ind); Christine Robinson (Ind)
Coffs Harbour	National	June Smith	**Andrew Fraser** (Nat)	Craig Christie	Ian Sutherland	Annette Guerry (NLT)
Coogee	Liberal	Paul Pearce	**Bruce Notley-Smith** (Lib)	Lindsay Shurey	Linda Dinkha	Victoria Gervay-Ruben (NLT)
Cootamundra	National	Charlie Sheahan	**Katrina Hodgkinson** (Nat)	Rod Therkelsen	Philip Langfield	Elio Cacciotti (NLT)
Cronulla	Liberal	Peter Scaysbrook	**Mark Speakman** (Lib)	Nathan Hunt	George Capsis	Christie Mortimer (NLT)
Davidson	Liberal	Douglas St Quintin	**Jonathan O'Dea** (Lib)	David Sentinella	Mariam Salama	Kate Bevan (NLT)
Drummoyne	Liberal	Jason Khoury	**John Sidoti** (Lib)	Alice Mantel	Isabelle Zafirian	Leon Belgrave (ORP); Pat Di Cosmo (NLT)
Dubbo	National	Stephen Lawrence	**Troy Grant** (Nat)	Matt Parmeter	Peter Scherer	Colin Hamilton (Ind); Rod Pryor (Ind); Ben Shepherd (NLT)
East Hills	Liberal	Cameron Murphy	**Glenn Brookes** (Lib)	Astrid O'Neill	Violet Abdulla	Jean Russell (NLT)
Epping	Liberal	David Havyatt	Damien Tudehope (Lib)	Emma Heyde	Darryl Allen	Kerry Fox (Ind); Sophia Kong (NLT)
Fairfield	Labor	**Guy Zangari**	Charbel Saliba (Lib)	Andrew Nicholson	Edward Royal	James Lazar (NLT)
Gosford	Liberal	Kathy Smith	**Chris Holstein** (Lib)	Kate da Costa	Andrew Church	Jake Cassar (Ind); Matthew Maroney (NLT)
Goulburn	Liberal	Ursula Stephens	**Pru Goward** (Lib)	Iain Fyfe	Adrian van der Byl	Wal Ashton (ORP); Stephen Fitzpatrick (NLT)
Granville	Liberal	Julia Finn	**Tony Issa** (Lib)	James Atanasious	Lara Sleiman Taouk	Steven Lopez (Ind); Mario Marra (NLT)
Hawkesbury	Liberal	Barry Calvert	**Dominic Perrottet** (Lib)	Danielle Wheeler	Caroline Fraser	Victor Alberts (NLT); Ralph Harlander (Ind); Kate Mackaness (Ind); Tania Rollinson (-)
Heathcote	Liberal	Maryanne Stuart	**Lee Evans** (Lib)	Natasha Watson	Ula Falanga	Ahmed Elawaad (NLT); Greg Petty (Ind)
Heffron	Labor	**Ron Hoenig**	John Koutsoukis (Lib)	Osman Faruqi	Shawn Arbeau	Anastasia Bakss (NLT)
Holsworthy	Liberal	Charishma Kaliyanda	**Melanie Gibbons** (Lib)	Signe Westerberg	Tony Maka	Adrian Atelj (NLT); Michael Byrne (-)
Hornsby	Liberal	Steve Ackerman	**Matt Kean** (Lib)	John Storey	Leighton Thew	Mary Di Cosmo (NLT); Mick Gallagher (Ind)
Keira	Labor	**Ryan Park**	Philip Clifford (Lib)	Elena Martinez	Joseph Carolan	Jason Leto (NLT)
Kiama	Liberal	Glenn Kolomeitz	**Gareth Ward** (Lib)	Terry Barratt	Steve Ryan	Carmel Pellegrini (NLT)
Kogarah	Labor	Chris Minns	Nick Aroney (Lib)	Brent Heber	Sonny Susilo	David Lin (NLT); Annie Tang (UP)
Ku-ring-gai	Liberal	David Armstrong	Alister Henskens (Lib)	Pippa McInnes	John Archer	Len Gervay (NLT)
Lake Macquarie	Independent	Melissa Cleary	Daniel Collard (Lib)	Ivan Macfadyen	Kim Gritten	Andrew Coroneo (NLT); **Greg Piper*** (Ind); Susan Strain (AJP)
Lakemba	Labor	Jihad Dib	Rashid Bhuiyan (Lib)	Chris Garvin	George El-Dahr	Yahya Chehab (NLT)
Lane Cove	Liberal	Andrew Zbik	**Anthony Roberts** (Lib)	Pierre Masse	Peter Colsell	Irma Di Santo (NLT); Jim Sanderson (Ind)
Lismore	National	Isaac Smith	**Thomas George** (Nat)	Adam Guise	Gianpiero Battista	Cherie Imlah (AJP); Alan Jones (NLT)
Liverpool	Labor	**Paul Lynch**	Mazhar Hadid (Lib)	Andre Bosch	Matt Attia	Mick Pezzano (NLT)
Londonderry	Liberal	Prue Car	Bernard Bratusa (Lib)	Shane Gorman	Maurice Girotto	Joe Arduca (NLT)
Macquarie Fields	Liberal	Anoulack Chanthivong	Pat Farmer (Lib)	Mary Brownlee	John Ramsay	Mick Allen (Ind); Antonetta Marra (NLT); Clinton Mead (-)
Maitland	Liberal	Jenny Aitchison	Steve Thomson (Lib)	John Brown	Anna Balfour	Tania Esposito (NLT); Philip Penfold (Ind)
Manly	Liberal	Jennifer Jary	**Mike Baird** (Lib)	Clara Williams Roldan	Annie Wright	Rod Jamieson (NLT)
Maroubra	Labor	**Michael Daley**	Brendan Roberts (Lib)	James Cruz	Jacquie Shiha	Georgia Constantinou (NLT)
Miranda	Labor	Greg Holland	Eleni Petinos (Lib)	Mick Nairn	Mark Falanga	John Brett (Ind); Andrew Tran (NLT)
Monaro	National	Steve Whan	**John Barilaro** (Nat)	Peter Marshall	Joy Horton	Leslie Dinham (NLT)
Mount Druitt	Labor	Edmond Atalla	Olivia Lloyd (Lib)	Brent Robertson	Josh Green	Ron Wilson (NLT)
Mulgoa	Liberal	Todd Carney	**Tanya Davies** (Lib)	Kingsley Liu	Jennifer Scholfield	Tania Canto (NLT)
Murray	National	Max Buljubasic	**Adrian Piccoli** (Nat)	Jordanna Glassman	David Elder	Garry Codemo (NLT); Helen Dalton (Ind); Brian Mills (Ind); Atul Misra (Ind)
Myall Lakes	National	David Keegan	**Stephen Bromhead** (Nat)	Stephen Ballantine	Andrew Weatherstone	Steve Attkins (Ind); Giovina Gouskos (NLT)
Newcastle	Labor	**Tim Crakanthorp**	Karen Howard (Lib)	Michael Osborne	Milton Caine	Jasmin Addison (NLT); Steve O'Brien (SA); Sam Reich (ACP)
Newtown	Greens	Penny Sharpe	Rachael Wheldall (Lib)	Jenny Leong	Karl Schubert	Dale Dinham (NLT); Noel McFarlane (ACP); Michael Walsh (AJP)
North Shore	Liberal	James Wheeldon	**Jillian Skinner** (Lib)	Arthur Chesterfield-Evans	Giuseppe Rotiroti	Moya Kertesz (NLT); Stephen Ruff (Ind); Pip Vice (ACP)
Northern Tablelands	National	Debra O'Brien	**Adam Marshall** (Nat)	Mercurius Goldstein	Holly Beecham	Trevor Gay (NLT); David Mailler (Ind)
Oatley	Liberal	O'Bray Smith	**Mark Coure** (Lib)	Philippa Clark	Wayne Lawrence	Dean Eades (NLT)
Orange	National	Bernard Fitzsimon	**Andrew Gee** (Nat)	Janelle Bicknell	John Gilbert	Juan Fernandez (NLT)
Oxley	National	Fran Armitage	Melinda Pavey (Nat)	Carol Vernon	John Klose	Joe Costa (NLT)
Parramatta	Liberal	James Shaw	**Geoff Lee** (Lib)	Phil Bradley	Kamal Boutros	Frank Arduca (NLT); Michelle Garrard (Ind); Joanne Kuniansky (-)
Penrith	Liberal	Emma Husar	**Stuart Ayres** (Lib)	Mark O'Sullivan	May Spencer	Jackie Kelly (-); Carolyn Kennett (-); Angelo Pezzano (NLT); Victor Waterson (-)
Pittwater	Liberal	Kieren Ash	**Rob Stokes** (Lib)	Felicity Davis	Zoran Curcic	Rebecca Arduca (NLT)
Port Macquarie	National	Kristy Quill	**Leslie Williams** (Nat)	Drusi Megget	Ashley Prinable	Paul Grasso (NLT)
Port Stephens	Liberal	Kate Washington	Ken Jordan (Lib)	Rochelle Flood	Peter Arena	Joe Shirley (NLT)
Prospect	Liberal	Hugh McDermott	**Andrew Rohan** (Lib)	Sujan Selventhiran	Sam Georgis	Angelo Esposito (NLT)
Riverstone	Liberal	Ian Morrison	**Kevin Conolly** (Lib)	Rob Vail	Allan Green	Karen Cacciotti (NLT)
Rockdale	Liberal	Steve Kamper	**John Flowers** (Lib)	Madeleina Snowdon	Lena El-Daghl	Sam Choker (NLT); Jamal Daoud (Ind)
Ryde	Liberal	Jerome Laxale	**Victor Dominello** (Lib)	Justin Alick	Julie Worsley	Joe Cacciotti (NLT)
Seven Hills	Liberal	Susai Benjamin	Mark Taylor (Lib)	Balaji Naranapatti	Brendon Prentice	Leonard Brown (Ind); Indira Devi (Ind); Jennifer Sheahan (NLT)
Shellharbour	Labor	**Anna Watson**	Mark Jones (Lib)	Peter Moran	John Kadwell	Romeo Cecchele (Ind); Hugo Morvillo (NLT); Wayne Quinn (Ind)
South Coast	Liberal	Fiona Phillips	**Shelley Hancock** (Lib)	Amanda Findley	Matt Rose	Licio Mallia (NLT)
Strathfield	Liberal	Jodi McKay	**Charles Casuscelli** (Lib)	Lance Dale	David Brook	Stephen Chehab (NLT)
Summer Hill	Labor	Jo Haylen	Julie Passas (Lib)	Max Phillips	Kylie French	James Cogan (-); Susan Price (SA); Don Tauriello (NLT)
Swansea	Liberal	Yasmin Catley	Johanna Uidam (Lib)	Phillipa Parsons	Luke Cubis	Joshua Agland (AJP); Paul Doughty (NLT); **Garry Edwards** (Ind); Chris Osborne (Ind)
Sydney	Independent	Edwina Lloyd	Patrice Pandeleos (Lib)	Chris Brentin	Elaine Addae	**Alex Greenwich*** (Ind); David Pelzman (NLT); Joanna Rzetelski (-); Victor Taffa (Ind)
Tamworth	National	Joe Hillard	**Kevin Anderson** (Nat)	Pat Schultz	Michelle Ryan	Peter Draper (Ind); Stan Heuston (-); Richard Nock (NLT)
Terrigal	Liberal	Jeff Sundstrom	Adam Crouch (Lib)	Doug Williamson	Murray Byrnes	Nadia Ruben (NLT)
The Entrance	Liberal	David Mehan	Michael Sharpe (Lib)	Scott Rickard	Hadden Ervin	Sonia Lopreiato (NLT)
Tweed	National	Ron Goodman	**Geoff Provest** (Nat)	Andrea Vickers	Michael Sichel	Kerrie Collins (NLT)
Upper Hunter	National	Martin Rush	Michael Johnsen (Nat)	John Kaye	Richard Stretton	Louisa Checchin (NLT); Lee Watts (Ind)
Vaucluse	Liberal	Gloria Nicol	**Gabrielle Upton** (Lib)	Megan McEwin	Beresford Thomas	Susanne Gervay (NLT)
Wagga Wagga	Liberal	Dan Hayes	**Daryl Maguire** (Lib)	Kevin Poynter	Keith Pech	Paul Funnell (Ind); Joe Sidoti (NLT)
Wakehurst	Liberal	Ned Barsi	**Brad Hazzard** (Lib)	Jonathan King	Silvana Nero	Robert Di Cosmo (NLT); Conny Harris (Ind)
Wallsend	Labor	**Sonia Hornery**	Hannah Eves (Lib)	Aleona Swegen	Damien Cotton	Tony Di Cosmo (NLT)
Willoughby	Liberal	Peter Cavanagh	**Gladys Berejiklian** (Lib)	Alison Haines	Melody Ho	Aldo Di Santo (NLT); Edward Re (ACP)
Wollondilly	Liberal	Ciaran O'Brien	**Jai Rowell** (Lib)	Patrick Darley-Jones	Susan Pinsuti	Maria Foia (NLT); Lynette Styles (Ind)
Wollongong	Labor	**Noreen Hay**	Cameron Walters (Lib)	Mitchell Bresser	Clarrie Pratt	Noreen Colonelli (NLT); Phil Latz (ACP); Arthur Rorris (Ind)
Wyong	Liberal	David Harris	Sandra Kerr (Lib)	Vicki Dimond	Stevan Dragojevic	Noel Holt (-); Annie McGeechan (NLT); Alex Norwick (-)

== Legislative Council ==
Sitting members are shown in bold text. Tickets that elected at least one MLC are highlighted in the relevant colour. Successful candidates are identified by an asterisk (*).

Half of the Legislative Council was not up for re-election. This included six Liberal members (David Clarke, Catherine Cusack, Scot MacDonald, Natasha Maclaren-Jones, Greg Pearce and Peter Phelps), five Labor members (Greg Donnelly, Peter Primrose, Penny Sharpe, Steve Whan and Ernest Wong), four Nationals members (Niall Blair, Rick Colless, Duncan Gay and Sarah Mitchell), three Greens members (Jan Barham, Jeremy Buckingham and David Shoebridge), one Christian Democrats member (Paul Green), one Shooters and Fishers member (Robert Brown) and one ex-Liberal independent (Mike Gallacher).

The Labor Party was defending nine seats. The Liberal-National Coalition was defending eight seats. The Greens were defending two seats. The Christian Democratic Party and the Shooters and Fishers Party were each defending one seat.

Labor candidates	Coalition candidates	Greens candidates	CDP candidates	SFP candidates
1. **Sophie Cotsis***; 2. **Walt Secord***; 3. **Lynda Voltz***; 4. **Shaoquett Moselmane***; 5. **Mick Veitch***; 6. **Adam Searle***; 7. Courtney Houssos*; 8. Daniel Mookhey; 9. **Helen Westwood**; 10. Aisha Amjad; 11. Annette Priest; 12. Jill Lay; 13. Floris Lam; 14. Blake Mooney; 15. Keith Williams; 16. Frank Alafaci; 17. Kun Huang; 18. Lucille McKenna; 19. Jennifer Clapham; 20. Rosemary Maker; 21. Daniel Barbar	1. **John Ajaka*** (Lib); 2. Ben Franklin* (Nat); 3. **Matthew Mason-Cox*** (Lib); 4. **Don Harwin*** (Lib); 5. Bronnie Taylor* (Nat); 6. Lou Amato* (Lib); 7. Shayne Mallard* (Lib); 8. **Trevor Khan*** (Nat); 9. Scott Farlow* (Lib); 10. Hollie Hughes (Lib); 11. John Williams (Nat); 12. Reena Jethi (Lib); 13. Craig Chung (Lib); 14. Jennifer Carpenter (Lib); 15. Matthew Connolly (Nat); 16. Steve Yang (Lib)	1. **John Kaye***; 2. **Mehreen Faruqi***; 3. Justin Field; 4. Dawn Walker; 5. James Ryan; 6. Penny Blatchford; 7. Melissa Brooks; 8. Jan Davis; 9. Christine Donayre; 10. Mithra Cox; 11. Marika Kontellis; 12. Sylvie Ellsmore; 13. Therese Doyle; 14. Harriett Swift; 15. Darelle Duncan; 16. Susan Jarnason; 17. Barbara Bloch; 18. Matthew Thompson; 19. Sue Stock; 20. De Brierley Newton; 21. Kylie Turner	1. **Fred Nile***; 2. Ross Clifford; 3. Peter Tadros; 4. Simon Khoury; 5. Soon-Hyung Kwon; 6. Stan Colefax; 7. Elwyn Sheppard; 8. Valerie Tarela-Moyes; 9. Beth Smith; 10. Joe Chircop; 11. Roger Bolling; 12. Kay Bolling; 13. Elwynne Waddell; 14. Graham Waddell; 15. Andrew Green; 16. Robyn Peebles; 17. Bernie Gesling; 18. Leeanne Gesling; 19. Arthur Moore; 20. Diana Thew	1. **Robert Borsak***; 2. Peter Johnson; 3. Karl Houseman; 4. Steve Lee; 5. Daniel Spears; 6. Jacqui Wood; 7. Alain Noujaim; 8. Dane Van Der Neut; 9. Leslie Palmer; 10. Sam Cannuli; 11. Danielle Neville; 12. Nadrra Sarkis; 13. Jason LeSage; 14. Craig Steel; 15. Tony McManus; 16. Mike Crockford; 17. Peter Richards; 18. Arthur Baker; 19. Linda Patchett; 20. Bob Shaw; 21. Dave Cook
Animal Justice candidates	Democrats candidates	ORP candidates	Socialist Alliance candidates	Fishing Party candidates
1. Mark Pearson*; 2. Lynda Stoner; 3. Tracey Keenan; 4. Rosemary Garlick; 5. Marcel Woolfe; 6. Julia Riseley; 7. Sally Dingle Wall; 8. Douglas Davison; 9. Ellie Robertson; 10. Wayne Ericksen; 11. Joanna Ericksen; 12. Carol Bellenger; 13. Debbie Tomasums; 14. Kate Paterson; 15. Laurie Akkanen; 16. Theresa Taylor	1. Rendall Wagner; 2. Ronaldo Villaver; 3. Simon Lovell; 4. Julia Melland; 5. Andrew Wallace; 6. Sue-Maree Olsen; 7. Mayo Materazzo; 8. David King; 9. Samantha Elliott-Halls; 10. Glenn Luxford; 11. Stephen Bingle; 12. Garry Dalrymple; 13. John Wiggin; 14. Thomas Barca; 15. Chris Ridings	1. Peter Whelan; 2. Mark Ellis; 3. James Whelan; 4. Suellen Bell; 5. Joaquim De Lima; 6. Richard Berner; 7. Adam Frost; 8. Graham Nickols; 9. Jim Musgrave; 10. Terje Petersen; 11. Vinay Kolhatkar; 12. Stephen Denton; 13. Keith Garemyn; 14. Janos Beregszaszi; 15. Robert Dawson	1. Sharlene Leroy-Dyer; 2. John Rainford; 3. Mia Sanders; 4. Howard Byrnes; 5. Pip Hinman; 6. Gregory McFarlane; 7. Rachel Evans; 8. John Coleman; 9. Coral Wynter; 10. Ben Kohler; 11. Jemma Nott; 12. Paul Benedek; 13. Kathryn Fairfax; 14. Duncan Roden; 15. Margaret Allan; 16. Nicole McGregor	1. Bob Smith; 2. Liz Stocker; 3. Craig Oaten; 4. Chris Goodbar; 5. Deanne Shepherd; 6. Stewart Paterson; 7. Luke Vitnell; 8. Adrian Purcell; 9. Miranda Shepherd; 10. Scott Atkins; 11. Craig McCartney; 12. Ted Mackay; 13. Kevin Johnson; 14. Vicki Johns; 15. Dave McCartney; 16. Michael O'Connor; 17. Paul Derrick; 18. Adrian Callaghan; 19. Matt Small; 20. Victor Shen
Cyclists candidates	Motorist candidates	Building Australia candidates	VEP candidates	No Land Tax candidates
1. Omar Khalifa; 2. Anthony New; 3. Ingrid Ralph; 4. Ken Thompson; 5. George Paxinos; 6. Yvette Paxinos; 7. James Pennefather; 8. Philip Griffiths; 9. Nick Bonich; 10. Chloe Mason; 11. David Denton; 12. Dave Gardiner; 13. Roman Ciurpita; 14. Barbara Hickson; 15. Angus Harper-Smith	1. Denis Walford; 2. Bob Honeybrook; 3. Grant Walford; 4. Paul Di Meglio; 5. Lindy Kyle; 6. Anthony Hogan; 7. Christine Sutherland; 8. Ross Bridge; 9. Robert Ward; 10. Neil Blanch; 11. Brendon Munn; 12. Terry Foster; 13. Phillip Diiorio; 14. John Wardle; 15. Wes Ward; 16. Nicole Walford; 17. Kath Ward	1. Ray Brown; 2. Eva Emrich; 3. Michael O'Donnell; 4. David Walter; 5. Nikki Atkins; 6. Geoff Craig; 7. Ross Harwood; 8. Christine Murray; 9. Bob Hearn; 10. Neville Jones; 11. John Vellenga; 12. Helen Boland; 13. Chris Ericoli; 14. John Rostirolla; 15. Simon Costigan; 16. Gregory Atkins; 17. Kevin Cranfield	1. Shayne Higson; 2. Richard Mills; 3. Deirdre Johnson; 4. Brian Beaumont Owles; 5. Judith Daley; 6. Bill King; 7. Natasha Mulhall; 8. Joshua Britt; 9. Kath Schilling; 10. John Mackenzie; 11. Sandi Steep; 12. Ken Meyer; 13. Donald Bayley; 14. Patricia Driscoll; 15. Geoffrey Williams	1. Peter Jones; 2. Pat Carbone; 3. Gus Macri; 4. James Ruben; 5. Gary Adamson; 6. Cathy O'Toole; 7. Sharon Fitzpatrick; 8. Ron Wilson; 9. Joe Lopreiato; 10. Jezza Armer; 11. Emma Cacciotti; 12. James Austin; 13. Frank Franzone; 14. Ulysses Maclaren; 15. Kate Lynch; 16. Patria Cook
No Parking Meters candidates	Group D candidates	Group H candidates	Group J candidates	Group M candidates
1. Charles Matthews; 2. Robert Morris; 3. Jeff Sayle; 4. Victor Brooking; 5. Eddie Nasr; 6. Kevin Barron; 7. Louise Morrisey; 8. Frank Bennett; 9. Paul Dean; 10. Michael Morrisey; 11. Ranbir Singh; 12. Hasmukhlal Gohil; 13. Jo-Anne Morrisey; 14. Michelle Morrisey; 15. Carol Matthews; 16. John Downey; 17. Neil Paine; 18. Michael Garnett; 19. Susan Bisaro; 20. Christopher Quinane; 21. Eileen Quinane	1. Christopher Buttel; 2. Sean Stratton; 3. Nicholas Renshaw; 4. Kristy Strong; 5. Peter Brennan; 6. Jamie Ambrose; 7. Mark Fisher-Webster; 8. Thomas Russell; 9. Bradley Law; 10. Andrew George; 11. Philip Imsies; 12. Simon Zammit; 13. Mark Howard; 14. Darrel Greentree; 15. Joshua Rousell; 16. Lynette Miller	1. Christine Byrne; 2. Jan Rashbrook; 3. Pamela Dilworth; 4. John Hutchinson; 5. Ken Parkes; 6. Brent Clark; 7. Luke Derwent; 8. Allan Hoy; 9. Adam Jones; 10. Sarah Hatcher; 11. Janet Donald; 12. Tonja Gibson; 13. Peter Driscoll; 14. Bruce Aitken; 15. Wendy Johnson	1. James Liu; 2. Wei Jing; 3. Cerelia Fountain; 4. Bao Ming Xian; 5. Jie Liang; 6. Hua Mei Ruan; 7. Xiao Fang Zhou; 8. Xiao Yi Guo; 9. Lam Chong Cheung; 10. Iok Long Ng; 11. Xue Ming Pan; 12. Kim Fong Ng; 13. Yingxi Ma; 14. Nan Yin; 15. Feng Yi Ni	1. James Jansson; 2. Andrea Finno; 3. Saritha Manickam; 4. Daniel Powell; 5. Cory Bill; 6. Markus Pfister; 7. Thomas Gordon; 8. Colin Simmer; 9. Jared Ackerman; 10. Myles Cover; 11. Eve Slavich; 12. Cameron Walsh; 13. Todd Rockoff; 14. James Haggerty; 15. Tom Byrt; 16. Nathan Page
Group P candidates	Group U candidates	Group V candidates	Group W candidates	Ungrouped candidates
1. Andrew Thaler; 2. Kate Schwager; 3. David Quince; 4. Anne Kennedy; 5. Peter Hill; 6. Venecia Wilson; 7. Mark Robinson; 8. Benjamin Heslop; 9. Sonya Marshall; 10. Ron Campey; 11. Pam Goldsmith; 12. Drew Simmons; 13. Rusan Hil; 14. Alisa Thaler; 15. Bill Schwager	1. Jennifer Stefanac; 2. Tucky Cooley	1. Ron Pike; 2. Paul Snaidero; 3. Paul Pierotti; 4. Pete Mailler; 5. Alan Barton; 6. Ross Davidson; 7. John Egan; 8. James Harker-Mortlock; 9. Brian Hopper; 10. Ellemarie McLachlan; 11. Lorraine Mouafi; 12. Julie Pike; 13. Jenny Wills; 14. Carmen Woods	1. Warwick Erwin; 2. Ray Robinson	Ramsay Nuthall; Jane Ward; Alan Hood; PJ Collins; Anthony Craig; Gordon Crisp; Robert Spreadborough; Stuart Baanstra; Sal Scevola; Alain Brix-Nielsen; David Ash; David Chen; John Justice; Aaron Baldwin; Geoff Cox; Tony Bennett; Mahesh Pundpal

== Unregistered parties and groups ==
- The Arts Party endorsed PJ Collins in the Legislative Council, who was an ungrouped candidate.
- The Australia First Party endorsed Tania Rollinson in Hawkesbury, Victor Waterson in Penrith and Alex Norwick in Wyong.
- The Centre Party endorsed Joanna Rzetelski in Sydney.
- The Communist League endorsed Joanne Kutiansky in Parramatta.
- The Country Party endorsed Helen Dalton in Murray, David Mailler in Northern Tablelands, Paul Funnell in Wagga Wagga and Group V in the Legislative Council.
- The Future Party endorsed Group M in the Legislative Council.
- The Socialist Equality Party endorsed Oscar Grenfell in Bankstown, Carolyn Kennett in Penrith, James Cogan in Summer Hill and Noel Holt in Wyong.
