= Electoral results for the district of Miranda =

Election results for Miranda, New South Wales, Australia

Miranda, an electoral district of the Legislative Assembly in the Australian state of New South Wales, was created in 1971.

== Members ==
Election	Member	Party
1971	Tim Walker	Liberal
1973	Tim Walker	Liberal
1976	Tim Walker	Liberal
1978	Bill Robb	Labor
1981	Bill Robb	Labor
1984	Ron Phillips	Liberal
1988	Ron Phillips	Liberal
1991	Ron Phillips	Liberal
1995	Ron Phillips	Liberal
1999	Barry Collier	Labor
2003	Barry Collier	Labor
2007	Barry Collier	Labor
2011	Graham Annesley	Liberal
2013 by	Barry Collier	Labor
2015	Eleni Petinos	Liberal
2019	Eleni Petinos	Liberal
2023	Eleni Petinos	Liberal

== Election results ==
=== 2023 ===
2023 New South Wales state election: Miranda
Party	Candidate	Votes	%	±%
Liberal	Eleni Petinos	24,017	45.4	−8.8
Labor	Simon Earle	19,781	37.4	+10.2
Greens	Martin Moore	3,842	7.3	+0.5
Independent	Gaye Cameron	2,712	5.1	+5.1
Sustainable Australia	Nick Hughes	2,512	4.8	+2.8
Total formal votes		52,864	97.1	−0.3
Informal votes		1,601	2.9	+0.3
Turnout		54,465	91.1	+1.4
Two-party-preferred result
Liberal	Eleni Petinos	25,503	52.3	−12.1
Labor	Simon Earle	23,214	47.7	+12.1
Liberal hold		Swing	−12.1	

=== Elections in the 2010s ===
==== 2019 ====
2019 New South Wales state election: Miranda
Party	Candidate	Votes	%	±%
Liberal	Eleni Petinos	26,417	53.84	−1.41
Labor	Jen Armstrong	13,213	26.93	−2.70
One Nation	Gaye Cameron	3,461	7.05	+7.05
Greens	Nathan Hunt	3,333	6.79	−0.18
Christian Democrats	George Capsis	1,604	3.27	−1.06
Sustainable Australia	Nick Hughes	1,038	2.12	+2.12
Total formal votes		49,066	97.35	+0.68
Informal votes		1,336	2.65	−0.68
Turnout		50,402	91.73	−1.54
Two-party-preferred result
Liberal	Eleni Petinos	28,414	64.57	+1.61
Labor	Jen Armstrong	15,593	35.43	−1.61
Liberal hold		Swing	+1.61	

==== 2015 ====
2015 New South Wales state election: Miranda
Party	Candidate	Votes	%	±%
Liberal	Eleni Petinos	27,325	55.3	−7.4
Labor	Greg Holland	14,654	29.6	+8.8
Greens	Mick Nairn	3,450	7.0	−1.0
Christian Democrats	Mark Falanga	2,139	4.3	+0.2
Independent	John Brett	1,109	2.2	−0.9
No Land Tax	Andrew Tran	777	1.6	+1.6
Total formal votes		49,454	96.7	+0.0
Informal votes		1,705	3.3	−0.0
Turnout		51,159	93.3	−0.7
Two-party-preferred result
Liberal	Eleni Petinos	28,562	63.0	−10.0
Labor	Greg Holland	16,800	37.0	+10.0
Liberal gain from Labor		Swing	−10.0	

Barry Collier (Labor) won the seat at the 2013 by-election with a swing of 26%.

==== 2013 by-election ====
2013 Miranda by-election Saturday 19 October
Party	Candidate	Votes	%	±%
Labor	Barry Collier	18,812	46.5	+24.2
Liberal	Brett Thomas	15,883	39.2	−21.5
Christian Democrats	George Capsis	2,840	7.0	+3.5
Greens	Murray Scott	1,757	4.3	−4.4
Independent	Lisa Walters	842	2.1	+2.1
Independent	John Brett	342	0.8	−3.9
Total formal votes		40,476	98.0	+0.7
Informal votes		813	2.0	−0.7
Turnout		41,289	84.8	−10.0
Two-party-preferred result
Labor	Barry Collier	20,751	55.1	+26.1
Liberal	Brett Thomas	16,916	44.9	−26.1
Labor gain from Liberal		Swing	+26.1	

Graham Annesley (Liberal) resigned.

==== 2011 ====
2011 New South Wales state election: Miranda
Party	Candidate	Votes	%	±%
Liberal	Graham Annesley	26,662	60.7	+18.3
Labor	Therese Cook	9,770	22.3	−20.5
Greens	Naomi Waizer	3,853	8.8	+2.1
Independent	John Brett	2,074	4.7	+3.1
Christian Democrats	Ern Hemmings	1,549	3.5	−0.1
Total formal votes		43,908	97.3	−0.7
Informal votes		1,218	2.7	+0.7
Turnout		45,126	94.8	
Two-party-preferred result
Liberal	Graham Annesley	28,395	71.0	+21.8
Labor	Therese Cook	11,598	29.0	−21.8
Liberal gain from Labor		Swing	+21.8	

=== Elections in the 2000s ===
==== 2007 ====
2007 New South Wales state election: Miranda
Party	Candidate	Votes	%	±%
Labor	Barry Collier	18,160	42.8	−8.4
Liberal	Graham Annesley	17,993	42.4	+6.1
Greens	Julie Simpson	2,817	6.6	+0.2
Christian Democrats	Albert Young	1,531	3.6	+3.2
AAFI	Samantha Feinbier	924	2.2	+0.5
Independent	John Brett	692	1.6	+1.6
Democrats	Rob Bunt	338	0.8	+0.8
Total formal votes		42,455	98.0	0.0
Informal votes		880	2.0	0.0
Turnout		43,335	94.2	
Two-party-preferred result
Labor	Barry Collier	20,097	50.8	−8.3
Liberal	Graham Annesley	19,494	49.2	+8.3
Labor hold		Swing	−8.3	

==== 2003 ====
2003 New South Wales state election: Miranda
Party	Candidate	Votes	%	±%
Labor	Barry Collier	20,489	51.7	+8.8
Liberal	Kevin Schreiber	14,493	36.6	−4.0
Greens	Julie Simpson	2,322	5.9	+1.8
Save Our Suburbs	Gordon Hocking	783	2.0	+2.0
AAFI	Allan Duckett	657	1.7	+0.1
Independent	John Moffat	590	1.5	+1.5
Unity	Lisan Yang	263	0.7	+0.7
Total formal votes		39,597	98.0	+0.0
Informal votes		814	2.0	−0.0
Turnout		40,411	93.1	
Two-party-preferred result
Labor	Barry Collier	21,758	59.1	+6.8
Liberal	Kevin Schreiber	15,036	40.9	−6.8
Labor hold		Swing	+6.8	

=== Elections in the 1990s ===
==== 1999 ====
1999 New South Wales state election: Miranda
Party	Candidate	Votes	%	±%
Labor	Barry Collier	16,996	42.9	+6.0
Liberal	Ron Phillips	16,099	40.6	−7.5
One Nation	Max Remy	2,842	7.2	+7.2
Greens	Kerry Nettle	1,612	4.1	+4.1
Democrats	Syd Hickman	1,460	3.7	+0.7
AAFI	Keith Eastwood	620	1.6	−2.2
Total formal votes		39,629	98.0	+1.4
Informal votes		805	2.0	−1.4
Turnout		40,434	94.4	
Two-party-preferred result
Labor	Barry Collier	19,002	52.3	+7.5
Liberal	Ron Phillips	17,353	47.7	−7.5
Labor gain from Liberal		Swing	+7.5	

==== 1995 ====
1995 New South Wales state election: Miranda
Party	Candidate	Votes	%	±%
Liberal	Ron Phillips	17,097	49.4	−7.4
Labor	Paul Smith	12,353	35.7	+0.7
Save Our Shire	Col Tallis	1,585	4.6	+4.6
AAFI	Beryl Perry	1,376	4.0	+4.0
Democrats	John Levett	1,257	3.6	−4.5
Call to Australia	Warwick Copeland	921	2.7	+2.7
Total formal votes		34,589	96.5	+4.7
Informal votes		1,257	3.5	−4.7
Turnout		35,846	94.7	
Two-party-preferred result
Liberal	Ron Phillips	18,623	56.7	−3.6
Labor	Paul Smith	14,239	43.3	+3.6
Liberal hold		Swing	−3.6	

==== 1991 ====
1991 New South Wales state election: Miranda
Party	Candidate	Votes	%	±%
Liberal	Ron Phillips	18,200	56.9	−2.2
Labor	Hazel Wilson	11,200	35.0	−2.7
Democrats	Lydia Clancy	2,601	8.1	+8.1
Total formal votes		32,001	91.8	−5.3
Informal votes		2,855	8.2	+5.3
Turnout		34,856	94.9	
Two-party-preferred result
Liberal	Ron Phillips	18,841	60.3	+0.1
Labor	Hazel Wilson	12,395	39.7	−0.1
Liberal hold		Swing	+0.1	

=== Elections in the 1980s ===
==== 1988 ====
1988 New South Wales state election: Miranda
Party	Candidate	Votes	%	±%
Liberal	Ron Phillips	18,577	61.5	+11.3
Labor	Anthony Iffland	11,623	38.5	−8.5
Total formal votes		30,200	96.8	−1.5
Informal votes		997	3.2	+1.5
Turnout		31,197	95.2	
Liberal hold		Swing	+9.9	

==== 1984 ====
1984 New South Wales state election: Miranda
Party	Candidate	Votes	%	±%
Liberal	Ron Phillips	15,242	50.3	+6.9
Labor	Bill Robb	14,176	46.8	−5.0
Democrats	Michael Moriarty	890	2.9	−1.9
Total formal votes		30,308	98.4	+0.7
Informal votes		497	1.6	−0.7
Turnout		30,805	94.6	+1.7
Two-party-preferred result
Liberal	Ron Phillips		51.8	+6.1
Labor	Bill Robb		48.2	−6.1
Liberal gain from Labor		Swing	+6.1	

==== 1981 ====
1981 New South Wales state election: Miranda
Party	Candidate	Votes	%	±%
Labor	Bill Robb	15,241	51.8	−1.7
Liberal	Lawrence Power	12,778	43.4	+1.9
Democrats	Richard Hopkins	1,407	4.8	−0.2
Total formal votes		29,426	97.7	
Informal votes		699	2.3	
Turnout		30,125	92.9	
Two-party-preferred result
Labor	Bill Robb	15,541	54.3	−2.2
Liberal	Lawrence Power	13,078	45.7	+2.2
Labor hold		Swing	−2.2	

=== Elections in the 1970s ===
==== 1978 ====
1978 New South Wales state election: Miranda
Party	Candidate	Votes	%	±%
Labor	Bill Robb	16,667	53.5	+7.5
Liberal	Tim Walker	12,949	41.5	−12.5
Democrats	William Sibley	1,557	5.0	+5.0
Total formal votes		31,173	98.6	0.0
Informal votes		446	1.4	0.0
Turnout		31,619	94.4	+3.4
Two-party-preferred result
Labor	Bill Robb	17,627	56.5	+10.5
Liberal	Tim Walker	13,546	43.5	−10.5
Labor gain from Liberal		Swing	+10.5	

==== 1976 ====
1976 New South Wales state election: Miranda
Party	Candidate	Votes	%	±%
Liberal	Tim Walker	16,323	54.0	+2.8
Labor	Bill Robb	13,910	46.0	+8.4
Total formal votes		30,233	98.6	+0.2
Informal votes		437	1.4	−0.2
Turnout		30,670	91.0	−3.8
Liberal hold		Swing	−2.4	

==== 1973 ====
1973 New South Wales state election: Miranda
Party	Candidate	Votes	%	±%
Liberal	Tim Walker	14,484	51.2	+4.3
Labor	John Brookfield	10,653	37.6	−3.2
Australia	Neva Wendt	2,083	7.4	−0.1
Democratic Labor	Bill Casey	1,085	3.8	−0.9
Total formal votes		28,305	98.4	
Informal votes		451	1.6	
Turnout		28,756	94.8	
Two-party-preferred result
Liberal	Tim Walker	15,977	56.4	+3.8
Labor	John Brookfield	12,328	43.6	−3.8
Liberal hold		Swing	+3.8	

==== 1971 ====
1971 New South Wales state election: Miranda
Party	Candidate	Votes	%	±%
Liberal	Tim Walker	13,304	46.9	
Labor	Bill Robb	11,574	40.8	
Australia	Milo Dunphy	2,135	7.5	
Democratic Labor	William Goslett	1,331	4.7	
Total formal votes		28,344	98.5	
Informal votes		434	1.5	
Turnout		28,778	95.8	
Two-party-preferred result
Liberal	Tim Walker	14,899	52.6	−0.7
Labor	Bill Robb	13,445	47.4	+0.7
Liberal notional hold		Swing	−0.7	
