= Electoral results for the district of Seven Hills =

Seven Hills, an electoral district of the Legislative Assembly in the Australian state of New South Wales, was created in 1981, abolished in 1991 and recreated in 2015.

== Members for Seven Hills ==
First Incarnation (1981–1991)
Election	Member	Party
1981	Bob Christie	Labor
1984	Bob Christie	Labor
1988	Bob Christie	Labor
Second Incarnation (2015–present)
Election	Member	Party
2015	Mark Taylor	Liberal
2019	Mark Taylor	Liberal

== Election results ==
=== Elections in the 2010s ===
==== 2019 ====
2019 New South Wales state election: Seven Hills
Party	Candidate	Votes	%	±%
Liberal	Mark Taylor	23,548	50.13	+0.44
Labor	Durga Owen	16,909	35.99	+3.45
Greens	Damien Atkins	3,038	6.47	−0.66
Independent	Alan Sexton	1,844	3.93	+3.93
Sustainable Australia	Eric Claus	863	1.84	+1.84
Conservatives	Jude D'Cruz	775	1.65	+1.65
Total formal votes		46,977	96.76	+0.63
Informal votes		1,572	3.24	−0.63
Turnout		48,549	90.45	−1.35
Two-party-preferred result
Liberal	Mark Taylor	24,518	56.36	−2.39
Labor	Durga Owen	18,988	43.64	+2.39
Liberal hold		Swing	−2.39	

==== 2015 ====
2015 New South Wales state election: Seven Hills
Party	Candidate	Votes	%	±%
Liberal	Mark Taylor	23,789	49.7	+1.3
Labor	Susai Benjamin	15,580	32.5	−0.5
Greens	Balaji Naranapatti	3,414	7.1	−0.5
Christian Democrats	Brendon Prentice	2,170	4.5	−0.3
Independent	Leonard Brown	1,132	2.4	+2.4
No Land Tax	Jennifer Sheahan	1,051	2.2	+2.2
Independent	Indira Devi	744	1.6	+1.6
Total formal votes		47,880	96.1	+0.1
Informal votes		1,927	3.9	−0.1
Turnout		49,807	91.8	+0.3
Two-party-preferred result
Liberal	Mark Taylor	25,337	58.8	−0.0
Labor	Susai Benjamin	17,791	41.3	+0.0
Liberal notional hold		Swing	−0.0	

District recreated

==== 1991 - 2015 ====
District abolished

=== Elections in the 1980s ===
==== 1988 ====
1988 New South Wales state election: Seven Hills
Party	Candidate	Votes	%	±%
Labor	Bob Christie	12,455	44.7	−15.5
Liberal	Leonard Robinson	9,271	33.3	−6.4
Independent	Russell Dickens	4,165	15.0	+15.0
Independent	Kathleen Cridland	1,944	7.0	+7.0
Total formal votes		27,835	96.5	−0.5
Informal votes		1,024	3.5	+0.5
Turnout		28,859	94.6	
Two-party-preferred result
Labor	Bob Christie	14,054	55.0	−5.2
Liberal	Leonard Robinson	11,504	45.0	+5.2
Labor hold		Swing	−5.2	

==== 1984 ====
1984 New South Wales state election: Seven Hills
Party	Candidate	Votes	%	±%
Labor	Bob Christie	16,726	60.1	−4.7
Liberal	Marc Clifford	11,090	39.9	+12.8
Total formal votes		27,816	96.9	+1.0
Informal votes		894	3.1	−1.0
Turnout		28,710	93.1	+1.3
Labor hold		Swing	−9.9	

==== 1981 ====
1981 New South Wales state election: Seven Hills
Party	Candidate	Votes	%	±%
Labor	Bob Christie	17,290	64.8	
Liberal	Heather Gow	7,237	27.1	
Democrats	Peggy Cable	2,146	8.1	
Total formal votes		26,673	95.9	
Informal votes		1,145	4.1	
Turnout		27,818	91.8	
Two-party-preferred result
Labor	Bob Christie	17,690	70.0	−7.1
Liberal	Heather Gow	7,587	30.0	+7.1
Labor notional hold		Swing	−7.1	
