= Electoral results for the district of Summer Hill =

Australian district election results

Summer Hill, an electoral district of the Legislative Assembly in the Australian state of New South Wales, was first established in 2015, partly replacing Marrickville.

== Members for Summer Hill ==
Election	Member	Party
2015	Jo Haylen	Labor
2019	Jo Haylen	Labor
2023	Jo Haylen	Labor

== Election results ==
=== Elections in the 2020s ===
==== 2023 ====
2023 New South Wales state election: Summer Hill
Party	Candidate	Votes	%	±%
Labor	Jo Haylen	25,922	52.1	+5.7
Greens	Izabella Antoniou	12,596	25.3	+4.9
Liberal	Bowen Cheng	8,340	16.8	−7.2
Animal Justice	Sandra Haddad	1,567	3.1	+0.8
Sustainable Australia	Michael Swan	1,333	2.7	+1.3
Total formal votes		49,758	97.5	+0.5
Informal votes		1,277	2.5	−0.5
Turnout		51,035	88.5	+0.7
Notional two-party-preferred count
Labor	Jo Haylen	37,057	79.8	+8.2
Liberal	Bowen Cheng	9,373	20.2	−8.2
Two-candidate-preferred result
Labor	Jo Haylen	28,598	66.3	−0.2
Greens	Izabella Antoniou	14,536	33.7	+0.2
Labor hold		Swing	−0.2	

=== Elections in the 2010s ===
==== 2019 ====
2019 New South Wales state election: Summer Hill
Party	Candidate	Votes	%	±%
Labor	Jo Haylen	22,639	46.41	+3.14
Liberal	Leo Wei	11,380	23.33	−0.50
Greens	Tom Raue	10,055	20.61	−6.70
Keep Sydney Open	Andrea Makris	2,791	5.72	+5.72
Animal Justice	Teresa Romanovsky	1,227	2.52	+2.52
Sustainable Australia	Dale Sinden	693	1.42	+1.42
Total formal votes		48,785	97.11	+0.45
Informal votes		1,451	2.89	−0.45
Turnout		50,236	88.84	−1.06
Two-party-preferred result
Labor	Jo Haylen	32,023	72.30	+2.16
Liberal	Leo Wei	12,271	27.70	−2.16
Labor hold		Swing	+2.16	

==== 2015 ====
2015 New South Wales state election: Summer Hill
Party	Candidate	Votes	%	±%
Labor	Jo Haylen	20,370	43.3	+1.5
Greens	Max Phillips	12,856	27.3	+3.0
Liberal	Julie Passas	11,216	23.8	−4.4
No Land Tax	Don Tauriello	855	1.8	+1.8
Christian Democrats	Kylie French	799	1.7	−0.3
Socialist Alliance	Susan Price	694	1.5	+1.5
	James Cogan	287	0.6	+0.6
Total formal votes		47,077	96.7	+0.5
Informal votes		1,625	3.3	−0.5
Turnout		48,702	89.9	−1.4
Notional two-party-preferred count
Labor	Jo Haylen	28,608	70.1	+7.5
Liberal	Julie Passas	12,183	29.9	−7.5
Two-candidate-preferred result
Labor	Jo Haylen	22,148	60.5	−2.1
Greens	Max Phillips	14,440	39.5	+2.1
Labor notional hold		Swing	−2.1	

Summer Hill was a new seat, combining part of the abolished district of Marrickville with parts of Canterbury, Strathfield and Balmain. The member for Marrickville, Carmel Tebbutt (Labor), did not contest the election. Summer Hill was a notional Labor seat as a result of the redistribution.
