= Barry Collier =

Barry Collier may refer to:

- Barry Collier (basketball) (born 1954), athletic director at Butler University and former basketball coach
- Barry Collier (politician) (born 1949), member of the New South Wales Legislative Assembly for Miranda in 1999
