= 2015 New South Wales state election =

State election for New South Wales, Australia in March 2015

- 28 March 2015

All 93 seats in the New South Wales Legislative Assembly and 21 (of the 42) seats in the New South Wales Legislative Council 47 Assembly seats were needed for a majority
- Opinion polls
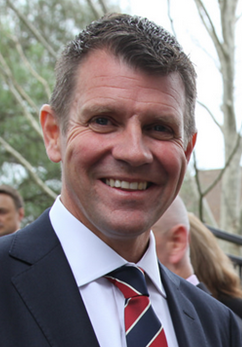

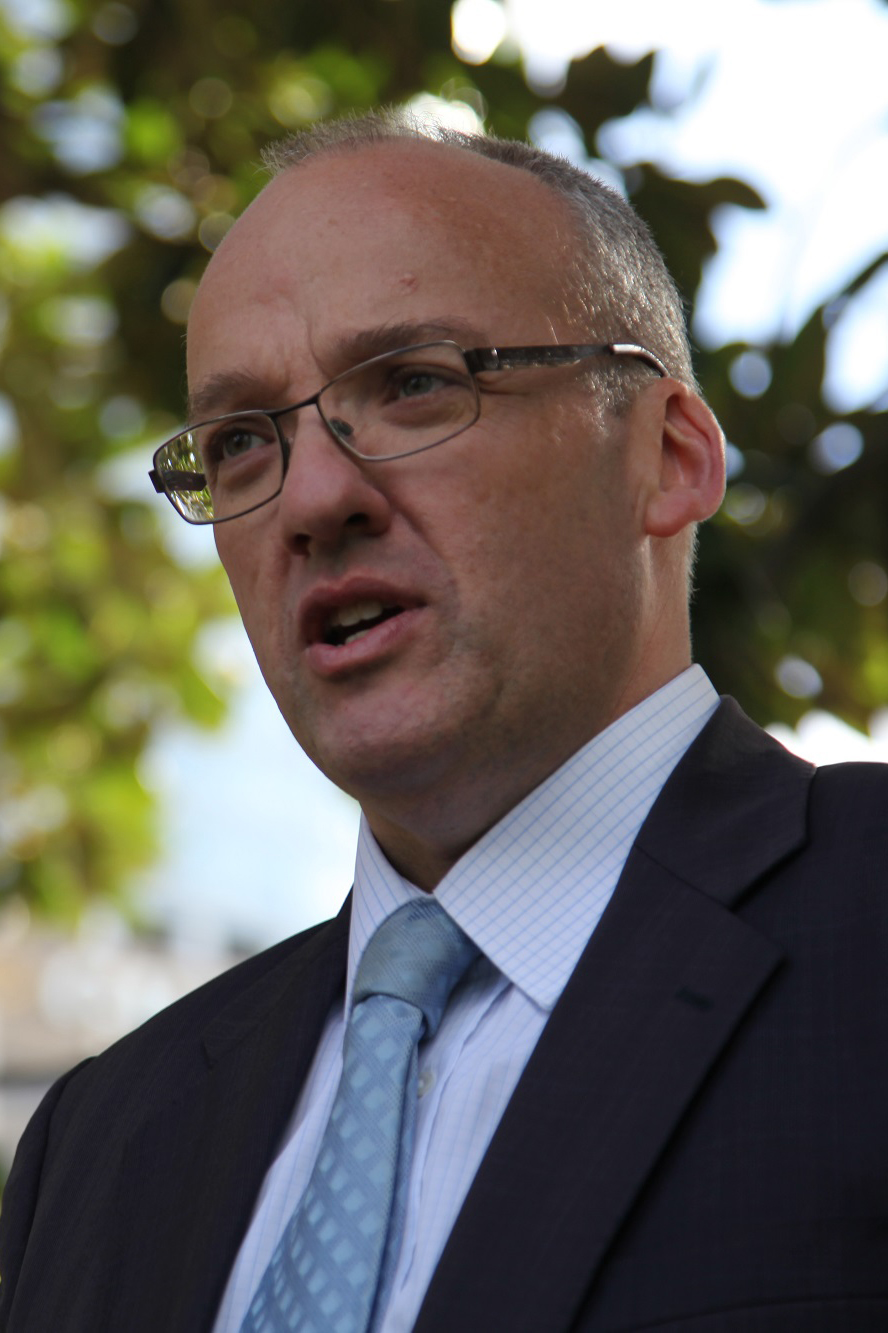

	First party	Second party	Third party
Leader	Mike Baird	Luke Foley	No leader
Party	Liberal/National coalition	Labor	Greens
Leader since	17 April 2014	5 January 2015	N/A
Leader's seat	Manly	Legislative Council (won Auburn)	N/A
Last election	69 seats, 51.2%	20 seats, 25.6%	1 seat, 10.29%
Seats won	54	34	3
Seat change	▼15	▲14	▲2
Popular vote	2,009,821	1,500,855	453,031
Percentage	45.63%	34.08%	10.29%
Swing	▼5.52	▲8.52	0.00
TPP	54.32%	45.68%
TPP swing	▼9.90	▲9.90
- Two-candidate-preferred margin by electorate
Premier before election
Mike Baird
Liberal/National coalition
Elected Premier
Mike Baird
Liberal/National coalition

The 2015 New South Wales state election was held on Saturday 28 March 2015. Members were elected to all 93 seats in the Legislative Assembly using optional preferential voting. Members were also elected to 21 of the 42 seats in the Legislative Council using optional preferential proportional representation voting. The election was conducted by the New South Wales Electoral Commission.

The one-term incumbent Liberal/National Coalition Government led by Premier Mike Baird and Deputy Premier Troy Grant was re-elected to a second four-year term with a reduced majority in the Legislative Assembly. The main Opposition Labor Party under Luke Foley won an increased share of the vote in most districts, though the party lost ground in some key races, including Foley's seat of Auburn. It managed to take 11 seats off the Coalition and Coalition-turned independents, mostly in areas of Labor "heartland" lost to the Liberals during the landslide in 2011, but nevertheless the Liberals still won a second consecutive landslide with a 15-seat majority. Most notably, Labor regained seats in west Sydney, the Central Coast and the lower Hunter.

Baird had campaigned on a controversial plan to lease 49 per cent of the state-owned electricity distribution network (known as the "poles and wires") to deliver an ambitious transport and social infrastructure program. Labor, supported by the state's union movement, ran on an anti-privatisation platform, while also promising a moratorium on coal-seam gas (CSG) extraction, and encouraging voters to register a protest vote against the Liberal-led Coalition federal government. Although the poles-and-wires proposal was poorly received in opinion polls, Baird himself was widely liked by the electorate.

Candidate nominations closed on 12 March and early voting began on 16 March.

== Results ==
=== Legislative Assembly ===
Winning party by electorate.

Party	Votes	%	+/–	Seats	+/–
Liberal	1,545,168	35.08	▼3.50	37	▼14
Labor	1,500,855	34.08	▲8.52	34	▲14
National	464,653	10.55	▼2.02	17	▼1
Greens	453,031	10.29	▲0.01	3	▲2
Independents	181,642	4.12	▼4.72	2	▼1
Christian Democrats	142,632	3.24	▲0.12	0	Steady
No Land Tax	88,792	2.02	New	0	New
Animal Justice	5,164	0.12	▲0.12	0	Steady
Cyclists	4,892	0.11	New	0	New
Unity	3,647	0.08	▲0.08	0	Steady
Outdoor Recreation	3,096	0.07	▼0.04	0	Steady
Socialist Alliance	1,295	0.03	▼0.05	0	Steady
Others	9,467	0.21	▼0.39	0	Steady
Total	4,404,334	100.00	–	93	–
Valid votes	4,404,334	96.56			
Invalid/blank votes	156,900	3.44	▲0.24		
Total votes	4,561,234	100.00	–		
Registered voters/turnout	5,040,662	90.49	▼2.06		
Two-party-preferred
Liberal/National Coalition	2,141,898	54.32	▼9.90		
Labor	1,801,195	45.68	▲9.90		
Total	3,943,093	100.00	–		

Popular vote
Liberal	35.08%
Labor	34.08%
National	10.55%
Greens	10.29%
Christian Democrats	3.24%
Independents	4.12%
Other	2.64%
Two-party-preferred vote
Coalition	54.32%
Labor	45.68%
Parliamentary seats
Coalition	54
Labor	34
Greens	3
Independents	2

=== Seats changing hands ===
Eleven seats won by the Liberals and Nationals in 2011 went to other parties in 2015. Incumbent Liberal MPs were defeated by Labor challengers in Blue Mountains, Campbelltown, Granville, Rockdale and Strathfield. Incumbents Don Page (a National) and Robyn Parker (a Liberal) retired, with the Greens taking Page's seat of Ballina and Labor taking Parker's seat of Maitland. Londonderry, Port Stephens and Wyong, whose Liberal incumbents had been sitting as independents since 2013 and retired in 2015, returned to Labor. Former Liberal Edwards, in Swansea, re-contested the seat as an independent but lost to Labor challenger Yasmin Catley.

Miranda Labor MP Collier had retired at the 2011 election, with the Liberals' Annesley picking up the seat on a swing of nearly 22 points. When Annesley quit politics in 2013, Collier returned to contest the by-election, securing a 27-point swing – the largest-ever at a NSW by-election. Collier decided not to re-contest the seat in 2015, and the Liberals' Eleni Petinos took it with 63 per cent of the two-party-preferred vote.

Northern Tablelands, won by an independent in 2011 and lost to the Nationals in 2013, was retained by the Nationals. Charlestown and Newcastle, won by the Liberals in 2011 and lost to Labor at by-elections in 2014, were retained by Labor.

Seat	Pre-election			Swing	Post-election		
Seat	Party	Member	Margin	Swing	Margin	Member	Party
Ballina	National	Don Page	16.9	+20.1	3.1	Tamara Smith	Greens
Blue Mountains	Liberal	Roza Sage	5.4	+13.6	8.2	Trish Doyle	Labor
Campbelltown	Liberal	Bryan Doyle	6.8	+14.1	7.3	Greg Warren	Labor
Gosford	Liberal	Chris Holstein	11.9	+12.2	0.2	Kathy Smith	Labor
Granville	Liberal	Tony Issa	3.8	+5.9	2.1	Julia Finn	Labor
Londonderry	Independent	Bart Bassett	5.3	+14.2	8.8	Prue Car	Labor
Maitland	Liberal	Robyn Parker	4.9	+18.8	13.8	Jenny Aitchison	Labor
Miranda	Labor	Barry Collier	23.0 (Liberal)	−10.0	13.0	Eleni Petinos	Liberal
Port Stephens	Independent	Craig Baumann	14.8	+19.5	4.7	Kate Washington	Labor
Rockdale	Liberal	John Flowers	3.5	+8.3	4.8	Steve Kamper	Labor
Strathfield	Liberal	Charles Casuscelli	6.4	+8.2	1.8	Jodi McKay	Labor
Swansea	Independent	Garry Edwards	0.3	+13.3	13.0	Yasmin Catley	Labor
Terrigal	Independent	Chris Hartcher	23.6	+14.6	9.0	Adam Crouch	Liberal
The Entrance	Independent	Chris Spence	11.5	+11.9	0.4	David Mehan	Labor
Wyong	Independent	Darren Webber	4.6	+13.3	8.7	David Harris	Labor
Members whose names are in italics retired at the election.

Following the 2013 redistribution (see below) the ABC recalculated the 2011 election results based on the new boundaries. These calculations deemed Macquarie Fields, a Labor marginal, notionally Liberal. The new seat of Prospect, which replaced Liberal-held Smithfield, was also considered notionally Liberal, albeit by a reduced margin. In Macquarie Fields, incumbent Labor MP Andrew McDonald did not re-contest and Labor candidate Anoulack Chanthivong defeated Liberal Pat Farmer. In Prospect, the sitting Smithfield MP, Andrew Rohan, was defeated by Labor candidate Hugh McDermott.

Seat	2011 election				2013 redistribution			Swing	2015 election		
Seat	Seat name	Party	Member	Margin	Party	Status	Margin	Swing	Margin	Member	Party
Cootamundra^{1}	Burrinjuck	National	Katrina Hodgkinson	31.1	National	New seat	30.3	−9.9	20.4	Katrina Hodgkinson	National
Holsworthy^{2}	Menai	Liberal	Melanie Gibbons	24.4	Liberal	New seat	10.7	−4.0	6.7	Melanie Gibbons	Liberal
Macquarie Fields^{3}	Macquarie Fields	Labor	Andrew McDonald	1.5	Liberal	Notional	1.8	+9.9	8.1	Anoulack Chanthivong	Labor
Murray	Murray-Darling	National	John Williams	27.2	National	New seat	30.9	−5.7	25.2	Adrian Piccoli	National
Murray	Murrumbidgee	National	Adrian Piccoli	27.9	National	New seat	30.9	−5.7	25.2	Adrian Piccoli	National
Newtown^{4}	Marrickville	Labor	Carmel Tebbutt	0.9	Greens	New seat	4.4	+4.8	9.3	Jenny Leong	Greens
Summer Hill^{4}	Marrickville	Labor	Carmel Tebbutt	0.9	Labor	New seat	12.7	−2.1	10.5	Jo Haylen	Labor
Prospect^{5}	Smithfield	Liberal	Andrew Rohan	4.8	Liberal	New seat	1.1	+4.5	3.4	Hugh McDermott	Labor
Seven Hills^{6}	Toongabbie	Labor	Nathan Rees	0.3	Liberal	New seat	8.8	–0.0	8.7	Mark Taylor	Liberal
^{1} Adrian Piccoli and Katrina Hodgkinson respectively held the abolished seats of Murrumbidgee and Burrinjuck, which were largely replaced with Murray and Cootamundra by the redistribution.^{2} Holsworthy replaced the abolished seat of Menai which was held by sitting member Melanie Gibbons, who retained the newly created seat.^{3} Macquarie Fields become notionally Liberal with a margin of 1.8. The sitting member, Andrew McDonald retired at the 2015 election.^{4} The seat of Marrickville held by former deputy premier Carmel Tebbutt, who retired at the 2015 election, was abolished and divided into Newtown and Summer Hill.^{5} Seven Hills replaced the majority of the abolished seat of Toongabbie which was held by former premier Nathan Rees, who retired at the 2015 election. The seat became notionally Liberal in the redistribution.^{6} Prospect replaced Smithfield and became notionally weaker for the Liberal Party.

=== Legislative Council ===
Party	Votes	%	+/–	Seats			
Party	Votes	%	+/–	2011 seats	2015 seats	Total seats	+/-
Liberal/National Coalition	1,839,452	42.61	▼5.07	11	9	20	▲1
Labor	1,341,943	31.09	▲7.36	5	7	12	▼2
Greens	428,036	9.92	▼1.20	3	2	5	Steady
Shooters and Fishers	167,871	3.89	▲0.19	1	1	2	Steady
Christian Democrats	126,305	2.93	▼0.19	1	1	2	Steady
Animal Justice	76,819	1.78	▲1.78	0	1	1	▲1
Others	336,072	7.79	▼2.87	0	0	0	Steady
Total	4,316,498	100.00	–	21	21	42	–

== Background ==
Pre-election composition of the Legislative Assembly: Government Liberal (42) Nationals (19) Opposition Labor (23) Crossbench Greens (1) Independent (8)

Pre-election composition of the Legislative Council: Government Liberal (12) Nationals (7) Opposition Labor (14) Crossbench Greens (5) Shooters (2) CDP (2)

Labor governed NSW from 1995 until 2011. Over the course of its last two terms, a succession of leadership changes, criminal convictions, corruption scandals and cancelled infrastructure projects began to eat away at Labor's support base. In a harbinger of things to come, the previously safe Labor seats of Ryde and Penrith were both resoundingly lost to the Liberals, in both cases turning into safe Liberal seats in one stroke.

In March 2011, the Liberals and Nationals, led by the Liberals' Barry O'Farrell, won one of the most comprehensive state-level victories since Federation, taking 69 seats in the Legislative Assembly. The new Government embarked on a program of reform, franchising the operation of Sydney Ferries, leasing three port corporations, establishing 'one-stop shop' government service centres, abolishing car registration stickers, decentralising government offices, and reducing back-office bureaucracy by merging or abolishing a number of state agencies. At the same time, the Government embarked on a major infrastructure program, including the North West Rail Link, CBD and South East Light Rail, Newcastle Light Rail, Northern Sydney Freight Corridor, WestConnex, NorthConnex, upgrades to the Pacific and Princes highways, and preparations for a new Western Sydney Airport.

In 2013, the Nationals won a by-election in Northern Tablelands after independent MP Richard Torbay resigned over corruption allegations.

=== The Government party room shrinks ===
The win in Northern Tablelands represented the high point for the Government party room. At the next by-election, caused when Sports Minister and member for Miranda Graham Annesley resigned to take a job in Queensland, the Liberals suffered the largest two-party-preferred swing in state history—26 points—and former MP Barry Collier reclaimed the seat for Labor.

Things got worse for the Government when news broke of Operation Spicer, an Independent Commission Against Corruption investigation into allegedly illegal campaign donations to a number of Liberal MPs from the Hunter and Central Coast. Throughout 2014, a succession of implicated MPs quit the parliamentary Liberal party to sit as independents: Craig Baumann (Port Stephens), Andrew Cornwell (Charlestown), Garry Edwards (Swansea), Marie Ficarra (Legislative Council), Mike Gallacher (Legislative Council), Chris Hartcher (Terrigal), Tim Owen (Newcastle), Chris Spence (The Entrance) and Darren Webber (Wyong).

Bart Bassett, MP for the Western Sydney seat of Londonderry, was also implicated and quit the parliamentary party. Cornwell and Owen later resigned from parliament following damning evidence presented at the Spicer public hearing, triggering by-elections in Charlestown and Newcastle. In what the Liberals described as an "act of atonement" for Owen and Cornwell's actions, the party did not contest either by-election, and Labor easily reclaimed both seats. All but Edwards indicated their intention not to stand for re-election in 2015 (Gallacher's Legislative Council term does not expire until 2019); Edwards would be heavily defeated by Labor's Catley.

=== Baird replaces O'Farrell ===
However, Spicer's biggest scalp was that of Premier O'Farrell, who found he'd inadvertently misled the Commission over a bottle of wine he'd received as a gift from lobbyist Nick Di Girolamo. O'Farrell called a press conference and announced his resignation on 17 April 2014. The frontrunners to replace him were Treasurer Mike Baird and Transport Minister Gladys Berejiklian, though in the event Baird stood unopposed, with Berejiklian elected unopposed as his deputy. A Cabinet reshuffle followed, with ministers Robyn Parker, Don Page, Greg Smith and George Souris dumped to make way for Troy Grant, Jai Rowell, Rob Stokes and Paul Toole. The Nationals followed suit six months later, with leader and Deputy Premier Andrew Stoner stepping down due to undisclosed family issues on 15 October. Stoner was quickly removed from Cabinet, replaced by John Barilaro; Grant succeeded him as Nationals leader and Deputy Premier.

Soon after taking office, Baird and Grant put a massive infrastructure program, funded by partial privatisation of the state's electricity networks, at the heart of the Government's re-election campaign.

=== Lead-up to the election ===
Labor soon faced leadership problems of its own. In the aftermath of a hostage drama at a café in central Sydney, it emerged that Opposition Leader John Robertson had, in his capacity as member for Blacktown, made a representation on behalf of the gunman, Man Haron Monis, three years earlier. Facing threats of being voted out, Robertson stepped down on 23 December. Though frontbenchers Michael Daley and Steve Whan considered running, both men withdrew in favour of the party's Planning spokesman and leader in the Legislative Council, Luke Foley.

Working in the Government's favour was a highly popular leader and a fully funded plan to build additional roads and rail lines in Sydney, easing congestion. However, the Government now faced significant headwinds on its way to the March election. The Opposition had a new leader relatively untainted by the corruption that had marred the previous Labor government. The federal Liberal/National government in Canberra was unpopular following a poorly received austerity budget. Their policy platform was a form of privatisation, something with limited electoral appeal, that sparked a well-resourced union scare campaign. Lingering anger over revelations from Operation Spicer remained in many seats. In regional areas, the Nationals had long faced a scare campaign on coal-seam gas. Earlier, first-term conservative premiers had been toppled in Victoria, then Queensland. Despite the Government's continuing lead in opinion polls, the ABC's Antony Green tipped a much closer contest than the numbers suggested, "with the government at risk of losing its majority."

== Redistribution ==
The 2007 and 2011 elections were conducted using boundaries set in 2004. The state constitution requires the Electoral Commission to review electoral district boundaries after every two elections, to ensure that the number of voters in each district is within 10 per cent of the "quota" – the number of voters divided by the number of Legislative Assembly seats. In 2012, the Commission began work on determining new boundaries for the 2015 election, a process commonly known as "redistribution". The quota was 52,770, meaning that each district needed to have between 47,000 and 58,000 enrolled electors.

The Nationals-held district of Murrumbidgee was abolished, and the Nationals-held districts of Burrinjuck and Murray-Darling renamed Cootamundra and Murray respectively. Burrinjuck MP Katrina Hodgkinson initially announced her intention to run for Goulburn, taking on her cabinet colleague, Liberal Pru Goward, on the grounds that much of the area she now represented would be in the Goulburn district come 2015. O'Farrell reportedly persuaded Hodgkinson to back down, to avoid splitting the conservative vote and potentially losing Goulburn to Labor. Hodgkinson went on to contest Cootamundra, while Murrumbidgee MP Adrian Piccoli contested Murray and Murray-Darling MP John Williams joined the party's upper house ticket.

In Sydney, replaced Liberal-held Menai was renamed Holsworthy, Liberal-held Smithfield was renamed Prospect, Labor-held Toongabbie was renamed Seven Hills, and Labor-held Marrickville was renamed Summer Hill. A new inner-city district, Newtown, was also created. Based on 2011 voting patterns, the ABC calculated that Seven Hills and Macquarie Fields were notionally Liberal seats, while Newtown was notionally Greens-held.

The new boundaries were gazetted on 18 September 2013, with effect from the 2015 election. The ABC calculated that in 2011 the new boundaries would have increased Liberal representation from 51 to 53, reduced Nationals representation from 18 to 17, increased Greens representation from one to two, and reduced Labor representation from 20 to 18.

== Candidates ==
For a full list of candidates, see Candidates of the 2015 New South Wales state election

=== Mike Baird ===
Mike Baird MP (born 1 April 1968) was the 44th Premier of New South Wales, the Minister for Infrastructure, the Minister for Western Sydney, and the Leader of the New South Wales Liberal Party from April 2014 until January 2017. He represented the New South Wales Legislative Assembly seat of Manly for the Liberal Party of Australia from 2007 until 2017. Before becoming Premier, he was the Treasurer of New South Wales in the O'Farrell government between 2011 and 2014. Baird has completed a Bachelor of Arts (Economics) at the University of Sydney and previously worked as an investment banker at Deutsche Bank, NAB and HSBC. Baird is married to Kerryn and they have three children.

=== Luke Foley ===
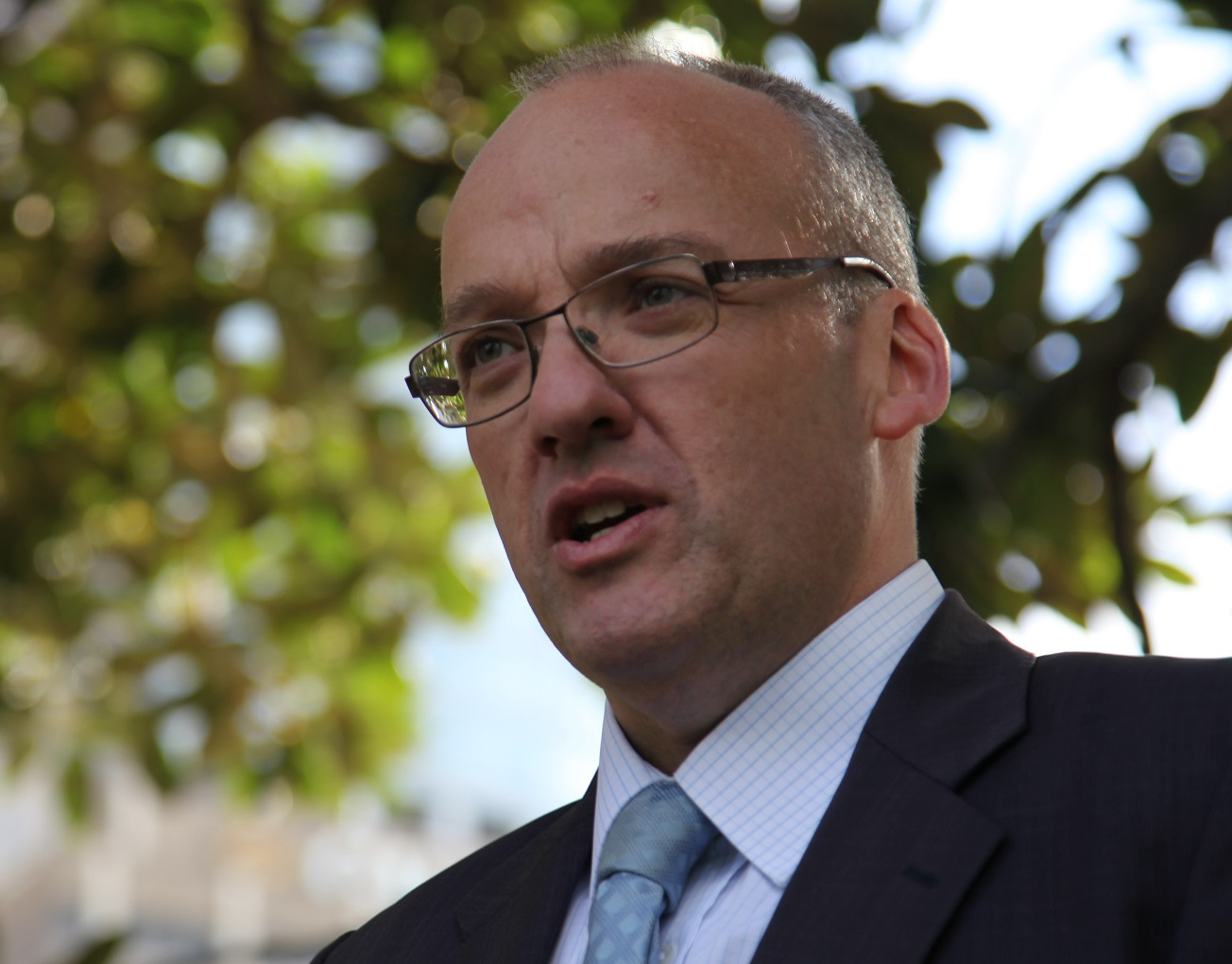
Luke Foley

Luke Foley took over as Labor leader from Robertson following the latter's resignation in December 2014. Foley had initially faced two challengers for the job – Michael Daley and Steve Whan – though both men ultimately withdrew from the race. As a member of the Legislative Council, Foley was required by convention to seek a seat in the Legislative Assembly, and so nominated for the inner western Sydney seat of Auburn. Both the incumbent MP, Barbara Perry, and her preselection challenger, Hicham Zraika, withdrew, allowing Foley to take the nomination unopposed.

During the campaign, Foley was unable to match his opponent's appeal, consistently recording net satisfaction ratings under 10 and "better premier" ratings around half that of Baird's (see below).

Hailing from the party's Socialist Left faction, Foley is a former National Union of Students president, Australian Services Union state secretary, Labor assistant state secretary and parliamentary staffer. In the Legislative Council, Foley served as both Opposition Leader in that House and the party's shadow minister for Planning. Foley is married to Edel McKenna and they have three children.

=== Legislative Assembly ===
Before the election, the governing Liberal and National parties held 42 and 19 seats, respectively. The main opposition Labor party held 23. The crossbench was composed of nine MPs: the Greens' Jamie Parker; independents Alex Greenwich and Greg Piper; and six MPs elected as Liberals in 2011 but who resigned from the parliamentary party following ICAC's Operation Spicer.

In 2015, the Liberals contested 74 seats and the Nationals 19. (The 2013 redistribution eliminated one Nationals seat in south-western NSW. The only Labor-held seat in which the Nationals stood a candidate was Cessnock.) Labor contested all 93 seats. Of the crossbenchers, only Parker, Greenwich and Piper recontested, along with former Liberal Garry Edwards.

=== Legislative Council ===
All six parties represented before the election in the Legislative Council nominated candidates.

As in previous elections, the governing Liberal and National parties fielded a joint ticket. Between them, the parties won eight Council seats in 2007, among them the seats of ministers John Ajaka and Matthew Mason-Cox. Eleven Liberal and Nationals members of the Legislative Council (MLCs) were elected in 2011 and did not face election in 2015. The 2015 ticket was headed by Ajaka for the Liberals and, facing his first electoral test, the former Nationals State Director Ben Franklin. The Liberals and Nationals directed their Legislative Council preferences, indeed "swap preferences", to the Christian Democrats.

The Labor ticket was branded as "Labor / Country Labor". Labor won nine Council seats in 2007, among them the seat occupied by Foley. (Foley was appointed to fill the seat left vacant by the resignation in 2010 of disgraced former minister Ian Macdonald.) Five Labor MLCs were elected in 2011 and did not face election in 2015. The 2015 Labor ticket was headed by former union official Sophie Cotsis. Labor directed its Legislative Council preferences to the Greens.

The Greens won two seats in 2007 – by Lee Rhiannon (now a federal NSW senator) and John Kaye. Rhiannon was later replaced by Cate Faehrmann, who in turn was replaced by Mehreen Faruqi. Kaye and Faruqi recontested in 2015. Three Greens MLCs were elected in 2011 and did not face election in 2015. The Greens directed their Legislative Council preferences to what they considered as 'progressive' micro parties, followed by Labor.

The Christian Democratic Party (CDP) had two seats, of which one faced election. Party leader Fred Nile headed the 2015 ticket. The CDP directed their Legislative Council preferences to, indeed "swap preferences with", the Liberals and Nationals.

The Shooters and Fishers Party (SFP) had two seats, of which one faced election. Incumbent Robert Borsak headed the 2015 ticket.

Two MLCs elected as Liberals, former Police Minister Mike Gallacher and former Hurstville mayor Marie Ficarra, had sat as independents following Operation Spicer. Ficarra, whose term expired in 2015, did not recontest. Gallacher, who was re-elected in 2011, remained an MLC.

A further 11 groups registered party names and fielded candidates:

- No Land Tax Campaign
- Outdoor Recreation Party
- Animal Justice Party
- Australian Motorist Party
- Building Australia Party
- No Parking Meters Party
- Voluntary Euthanasia Party
- Socialist Alliance
- The Fishing Party
- Australian Democrats
- Australian Cyclists Party

Eight groups nominated without a registered party name. Seventeen candidates nominated without groups.

=== Retiring members ===
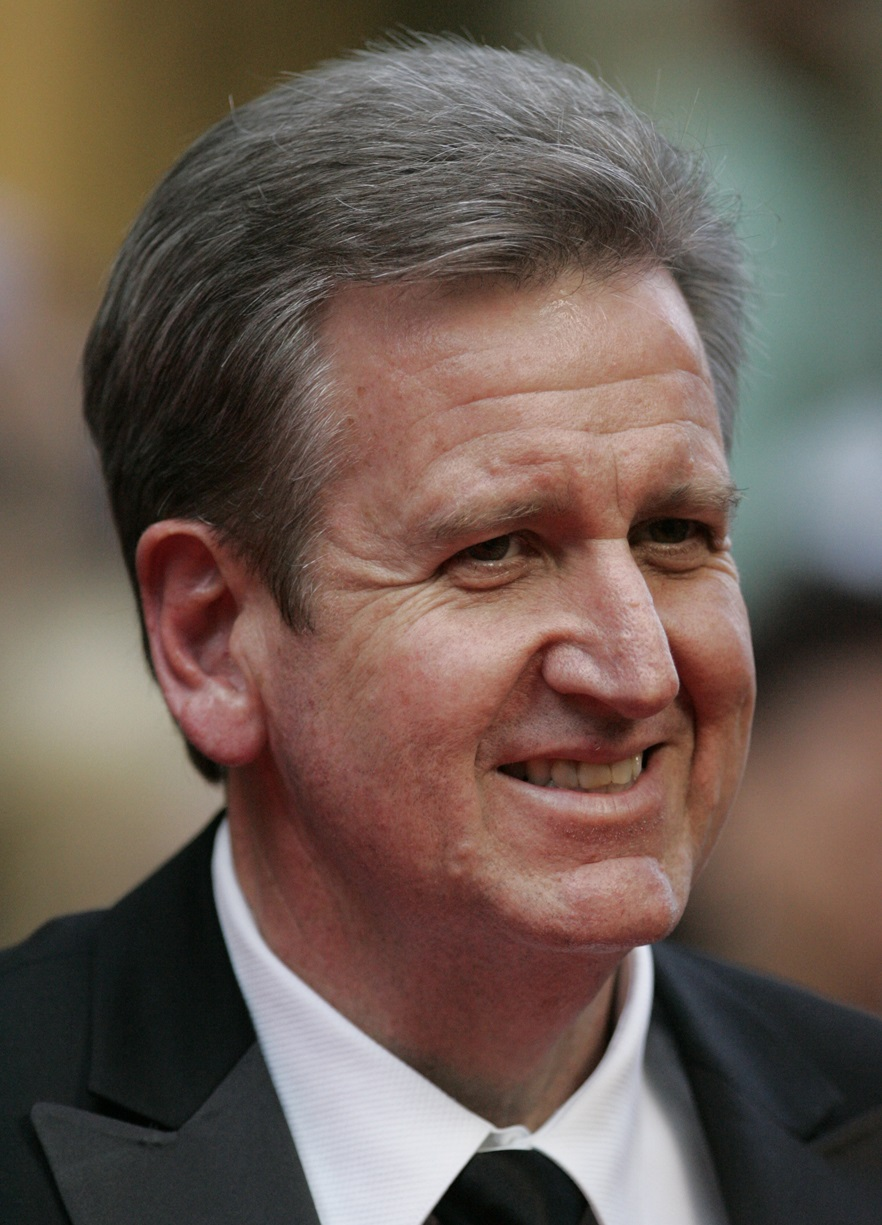
Former Premier O'Farrell was among the MPs retiring at the 2015 election.

Former Premier O'Farrell (Liberal, Ku-ring-gai) did not re-contest his seat, along with dumped former ministers Greg Smith (Liberal, Epping), Don Page (Nationals, Ballina), Robyn Parker (Liberal, Maitland), George Souris (Nationals, Upper Hunter) and Andrew Stoner (Nationals, Oxley). Long-serving MLCs Charlie Lynn (Liberal) and Jenny Gardiner (Nationals) also announced they would not be running again. Lynn, then aged 70, planned to run for the state presidency of the Returned and Services League.

All but two of the former Liberal MPs implicated by Operation Spicer announced they would not re-contest: Bassett (Londonderry), Baumann (Port Stephens), Hartcher (Terrigal), Spence (The Entrance), Webber (Wyong) and Ficarra (Legislative Council).

On the Labor side, Barbara Perry, who had been facing a preselection challenge for her seat of Auburn, withdrew to allow Foley to win Labor's nomination unopposed. Former Premier Nathan Rees (Toongabbie), former deputy Premier Carmel Tebbutt (Marrickville) and Father of the House Richard Amery (Mount Druitt) also announced their intention to quit politics, along with Cherie Burton (Kogarah), Barry Collier (Miranda), Amanda Fazio (after losing preselection for her Legislative Council seat), Robert Furolo (Lakemba), and Andrew McDonald (Macquarie Fields).

== Campaign ==
The Liberal campaign slogans were "Back Baird" and "Keep NSW Working". Labor ran on "A New Approach for NSW".

=== Koalas ===
In January 2015, Labor leader Luke Foley announced a policy to create a Great Koala National Park and hold a koala summit.

=== Poles and wires ===
Baird sought a mandate to lease 49% of the government's electricity distributors, known locally as the "poles and wires", for 99 years and invest the proceeds in new road, public transport, water, health and education infrastructure. With opposition to the lease forming the centrepiece of Labor's campaign, the election was widely viewed as a referendum on the proposal.

The government's plan involved the lease of 100% of high-voltage distributor TransGrid and majority stakes in Ausgrid and Endeavour Energy, which together cover local distribution in metropolitan NSW. Country-based Essential Energy was not part of the proposal. The proceeds, estimated at $20 billion, were to be spent on major projects including an extension of the under-construction North West Rail Link to the city centre and on to Bankstown. The plan enjoyed support, from business groups, such as the Energy Users' Association, the Business Council and the Australian Industry Group; and by transport lobby groups Infrastructure Partnerships Australia and the Tourism and Transport Forum. In addition, a number of senior Labor figures came out in support, including former Prime Minister Paul Keating, former NSW Treasurer Michael Costa, and former federal Resources Minister Martin Ferguson. Following the election, former Labor Premiers Bob Carr and Morris Iemma and former Labor Treasurer Michael Egan added their voices in support. Full privatisation of poles and wires also had the support of Australia's Productivity Commission.

The plan was opposed by Labor, the Greens, the Shooters & Fishers and a number of unions. The plan also polled poorly and attracted little support on the ABC's Vote Compass site.

Labor's campaign in opposition, supported by the union-funded television, outdoor and direct-mail advertising, rested on three arguments:

- that retail prices would rise
- that under a partial lease arrangement, the assets would be "gone for good"
- that the potential involvement of Chinese investors posed a risk to national security.

The party's claims on price increases were debunked by separate reports from Australian Broadcasting Corporation, Deloitte Access Economics and the Grattan Institute. Dr Tom Parry, formerly the head of NSW's Independent Pricing and Regulatory Tribunal, told The Australian "all the evidence" was that privatised networks "have much better cost controls ... I don't see why there's any basis to suggest that network charges will go up as a result of privatisation."

Some of the most savage criticism came from within the Labor party itself. Keating dismissed the campaign as the work of "some obscurantists". Ferguson went further, saying he was "ashamed of the Party" and accusing Foley and the unions of "deliberately misleading the public, creating unnecessary fear and trying to scare people." Costa, whose own privatisation plan had been rejected by Labor's state conference, slammed "a small, privileged special interest group, the electricity unions" for repeating "lie after desperate lie" on the government's plan. Egan said simply "I would've thought the Labor Party had grown up on that issue."

Foley's suggestion that Chinese investment represented a national security risk was dismissed as racist "dog-whistle politics" by treasurer Andrew Constance and Egan. Federal Race Discrimination Commissioner Tim Soutphommasane, himself a former Labor staffer, implored Labor and the unions on Twitter not to "licence xenophobia".

=== Coal-seam gas ===
Coal-seam gas (CSG) extraction became a major issue, particularly on the fringes of the metropolitan area and in the Northern Rivers region. When it left office, Labor had awarded CSG licences covering about 60 per cent of the state's land area. The Liberals and Nationals also supported CSG as a means to create regional jobs and prevent an expected increase in domestic natural gas prices. Responding to what was described as "a climate of community unease" about land access and the possibility of environmental damage, the Government asked the state's independent Chief Scientist, Professor Mary O'Kane, to review the CSG industry in NSW. O'Kane concluded that "the technical challenges and risks posed by the CSG industry can in general be managed", allowing extraction to continue. Nonetheless, the Government had gas firms hand back many of the most contentious outstanding undeveloped licences in Sydney, the Central Coast and the Northern Rivers.

Labor promised to go further, simply banning CSG extraction statewide, an approach which would have led to higher natural gas prices, triggered compensation payments to gas investors and, according to the industry, revealed "a stubborn refusal to face the facts" in the light of the O'Kane report. The Greens, who had always opposed CSG, went on to beat Labor into second place on primary votes in two Nationals-held Northern Rivers seats, Ballina and Lismore.

=== Newcastle revitalisation ===
In December 2013, the government had suspended services on the surface-level train line that separates the Newcastle city centre from the Hunter River waterfront. The line had long been considered an impediment to the city's development, and the government's plan was to close the line and build a light rail system in its place. Labor, which had advocated for such a plan in government, now led opposition to it.

=== Health and education ===
Labor criticised alleged cuts to health and education.

=== Character and experience ===
Labor attacked Baird for his former career in banking and his friendship with prime minister Tony Abbott, whose electorate of Warringah overlaps Baird's seat of Manly. At the time of the election, Abbott was polling poorly. In an echo of the Liberals' successful 2004 campaign against then Opposition Leader Mark Latham, the Government branded Foley an 'L-plate' leader on the basis of his lack of ministerial and leadership experience.

=== Incidents ===
Baird's campaign bus was attacked by graffiti vandals during an overnight stop in Katoomba. Foley later joked on radio: “Fancy leaving your bus out overnight in Katoomba, unguarded. You’re asking for trouble. I’m surprised there are still wheels." Foley's comments drew criticism from both Blue Mountains MP Roza Sage and the local Chamber of Commerce.

An error on the Electoral Commission's "iVote" electronic pre-poll voting system reportedly omitted the Animal Justice Party from the "above the line" section of the Legislative Council ballot for 36 hours, during which time 19,000 votes were cast. Animal Justice, a micro-party that received less than two per cent of the vote, is nonetheless considered a contender for the 21st and final Council seat, thanks to a preference deal with the Greens. The party's lead candidate, Mark Pearson, said he was considering legal action if he did not gain a seat.

On 26 March, a 20-year-old Liberal campaign volunteer in Cabramatta was allegedly struck by a Labor volunteer during an altercation outside a pre-poll centre. A video of the incident was captured by the alleged victim on her mobile phone. Police were reportedly investigating the incident.

East Hills Labor candidate Cameron Murphy alleged he had been the victim of a dirty tricks campaign, involving leaflets and stickers branding the civil libertarian as a "paedophile lover" because of his work as president of the NSW Council for Civil Liberties. East Hills, held by Labor continuously from 1953 to 2011, was won in 2011 by Liberal Glenn Brookes with a margin of 0.2 points (adjusting for boundary changes in 2013). Murphy told the press he had lodged a complaint with the Electoral Commission and was seeking legal advice.

The newly registered No Land Tax Party fielded candidates in all 93 electoral districts, thus maximising their chances of receiving public funding. Party leader Peter Jones conceded he had not met half of the candidates, many of whom did not live in the districts they hoped to represent. In Bega, held by Treasurer Andrew Constance for the Liberals, reports surfaced during the campaign that No Land Tax candidate Clyde Archard had in fact died in Borneo as a prisoner of war in 1945. He nonetheless received 2.3 per cent of the vote.

=== Newspaper endorsements ===
In the final week of the campaign, the Liberals and Nationals received the endorsement of the main daily and Sunday newspapers in the state: The Australian, The Australian Financial Review, The Daily Telegraph, The Sunday Telegraph, The Sun-Herald and The Sydney Morning Herald.

=== Election night ===
Election night coverage was provided by the ABC, Seven, Nine and Sky News Australia. Collectively, the three free-to-air programs had 371,000 viewers in the Sydney market.

Labor supporters gathered at Dooley's Catholic Club in Lidcombe. Foley conceded defeat at 9.20 pm, saying "a majority of voters have decided that now is too soon for Labor to return to government." Liberal supporters gathered at Sydney's Sofitel Sydney Wentworth, where Baird claimed victory at 9.45 pm. "The reason I love this state is because of its people," Baird told the crowd, "And tonight they have chosen hope over fear."

== Aftermath ==
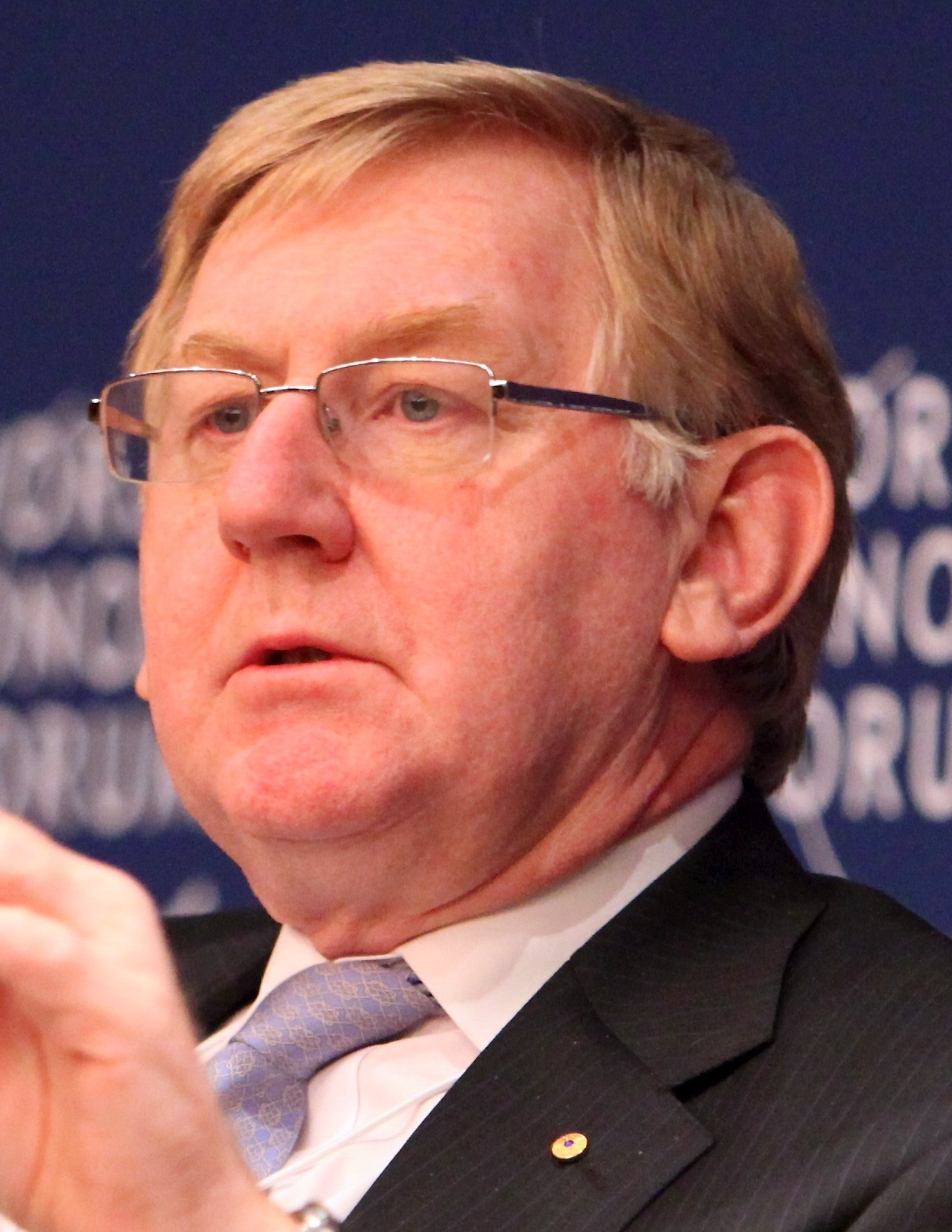
Ferguson, a former ACTU secretary and Labor minister raised the ire of his party during the campaign.

On 1 April Baird announced a reshuffle of the ministry. His deputy, Berejiklian, was promoted to Treasurer, while Constance moved to Transport. Nationals leader Grant took on Justice and Police. Rob Stokes was promoted from Environment to Planning; Gabrielle Upton from Community Services to Attorney-General. Goward was demoted from Planning to Mental Health. Ministers Hodgkinson and Mason-Cox, along with Liberal Jai Rowell and National Kevin Humphries were dropped from the ministry in favour of Liberals David Elliott and Mark Speakman and Nationals Niall Blair and Leslie Williams.

On election night Foley told supporters he intended to stay on as party leader. Daley, his former leadership rival, ruled out a challenge, saying the party was in a "rebuilding phase".

Federal Opposition Leader Bill Shorten, Australian Council of Trade Unions (ACTU) secretary Dave Oliver, NSW Labor secretary Jamie Clements, Senator Sam Dastyari and other Labor figures called for Ferguson to be expelled from Labor for him slamming the party's stance on the privatization – something Dastyari characterised as "high treason" and a "bastard act". Ferguson, a 40-year veteran of the party, former ACTU president and former federal minister, stood by his remarks during the campaign, saying "I've done nothing but express a consistent policy position that in the end will mean lower energy prices for the traditional base that the Labor Party is supposed to represent." Labor was not united in the push to expel Ferguson, however, with former ACTU secretary Bill Kelty and former NSW Premier Morris Iemma among those coming to his defence. Iemma described the expulsion push as "petty and vindictive", exposing the party as "intolerant and incapable of embracing divergent views."

A number of campaign workers for the No Land Tax Party came forward after the election claiming they had not been paid as promised by party leader Peter Jones. Others claimed they had signed up thinking they would be working for the Electoral Commission. Jones later took up the iVote complaint, even though it did not affect his party, saying "The only way the election won't be overturned is if the judge is on the take or on crystal meth."

=== Milestones ===
The election was notable for New South Wales in that:

- This was the first time since 1973 that a non-Labor government had been reelected with an overall majority
- One of the main party leaders, Luke Foley, was not a member of the Legislative Assembly prior to the election
- The Greens won three seats in the Assembly, a record for a mainland state (until 2018, when they won three seats in Victoria and 2022, when they won a fourth in Victoria), and came close to winning a fifth
- Voters could vote online for the second time at a State general election using the iVote system run by the New South Wales Electoral Commission
- Mike Baird became the first non-elected Liberal Premier to be elected in his own right
- New South Wales became the first state to replace pencils at polling places with pens; while both pens and pencils can be used on ballot papers, traditionally pencils are provided at polling places
- Luke Foley would later resign as Labor leader in November 2018, months out from the 2019 election. This meant that Foley became the first losing Labor leader who was neither a sitting or former Premier not to contest a second election.
- This was the last election that the Christian Democratic Party won a Legislative Council seat, and the last Christian named party in Australia to win a seat in Parliament until the 2025 Western Australian state election when the Australian Christians party won a seat.

== Opinion polling ==
Several research, media and polling firms conduct opinion polls during the parliamentary term and prior to the state election in relation to voting. Most firms use the flow of preferences at the previous election to determine the two-party-preferred vote; others ask respondents to nominate preferences.

== See also ==
- Members of the New South Wales Legislative Assembly, 2011–2015
- Members of the New South Wales Legislative Council, 2011–2015
