= Electoral results for the district of Toongabbie =

Election results for Toongabbie, New South Wales, Australia

Toongabbie, an electoral district of the Legislative Assembly in the Australian state of New South Wales was created in 2007 and abolished in 2015.

Election	Member	Party
2007	Nathan Rees	Labor
2011	Nathan Rees	Labor

== Election results ==
=== Elections in the 2010s ===
==== 2011 ====
2011 New South Wales state election: Toongabbie
Party	Candidate	Votes	%	±%
Labor	Nathan Rees	18,340	41.2	−10.5
Liberal	Kirsty Lloyd	17,889	40.2	+12.6
Greens	Len Hobbs	2,367	5.3	−1.5
Shooters and Fishers	Peter Johnson	2,346	5.3	+5.3
Christian Democrats	Brendon Prentice	2,016	4.5	−3.4
Independent	Michele Read	942	2.1	+2.1
Independent	Ashok Kumar	624	1.4	+1.4
Total formal votes		44,524	96.4	+0.4
Informal votes		1,671	3.6	−0.4
Turnout		46,195	93.9	−2.0
Two-party-preferred result
Labor	Nathan Rees	19,989	50.3	−14.2
Liberal	Kirsty Lloyd	19,784	49.7	+14.2
Labor hold		Swing	−14.2	

=== Elections in the 2000s ===
==== 2007 ====
2007 New South Wales state election: Toongabbie
Party	Candidate	Votes	%	±%
Labor	Nathan Rees	22,533	51.7	−4.7
Liberal	Kirsty Lloyd	12,030	27.6	+0.4
Christian Democrats	Sam Baissari	3,457	7.9	+3.2
Greens	Doug Williamson	2,983	6.8	+2.0
Against Further Immigration	Norman Carey	1,713	3.9	+1.4
Unity	Chuan Ren	848	1.9	+0.7
Total formal votes		43,564	96.0	−0.8
Informal votes		1,802	4.0	+0.8
Turnout		45,366	95.9	
Two-party-preferred result
Labor	Nathan Rees	24,967	64.5	−2.2
Liberal	Kirsty Lloyd	13,758	35.5	+2.2
Labor notional hold		Swing	−2.2	
