= Electoral district of Winston Hills =

Electoral district of New South Wales

Winston Hills New South Wales—Legislative Assembly
- Interactive map of district boundaries from the 2023 state election
- State: New South Wales
- Created: 2023
- MP: Mark Taylor
- Party: Liberal
- Namesake: Winston Hills
- Electors: 61,457 (2023)
- Area: 35.35 km^{2} (13.6 sq mi)
- Coordinates: 33°46′08″S 150°57′18″E
Electorates around Winston Hills:
Riverstone	Kellyville	Castle Hill
Blacktown	Winston Hills	Epping
Blacktown	Prospect	Parramatta; Granville

Winston Hills is an electoral district of the Legislative Assembly in the Australian state of New South Wales. It has been represented since it was established in 2023 by Mark Taylor of the Liberal Party. It is an urban electorate in Western Sydney.

== History ==
Winston Hills was created in a redistribution ahead of the 2023 election, largely replacing the abolished electorate of Seven Hills. Prior to its abolition, Seven Hills was represented by Mark Taylor of the Liberal Party. Taylor successfully transferred to Winston Hills at the 2023 election.

== Geography ==
On its current boundaries, Winston Hills takes in the suburbs of Constitution Hill, Glenwood, Kings Langley, Lalor Park, Northmead, Old Toongabbie, Winston Hills and parts of Baulkham Hills, Blacktown, Pendle Hill, Seven Hills, Toongabbie, Wentworthville and Westmead.

== Members for Winston Hills ==
Member	Party	Term
Mark Taylor	Liberal	2023–present

== Election results ==
2023 New South Wales state election: Winston Hills
Party	Candidate	Votes	%	±%
Liberal	Mark Taylor	25,251	47.5	−1.9
Labor	Sameer Pandey	21,030	39.5	+3.0
Greens	Damien Atkins	4,669	8.8	+1.9
Sustainable Australia	Anthony Chadszinow	2,262	4.3	+2.9
Total formal votes		53,212	96.7	−0.0
Informal votes		1,813	3.3	+0.0
Turnout		55,025	89.5	−1.4
Two-party-preferred result
Liberal	Mark Taylor	26,203	51.8	−3.9
Labor	Sameer Pandey	24,381	48.2	+3.9
Liberal hold		Swing	−3.9	
