= 2013 Miranda state by-election =

By-election in New South Wales, Australia

- 19 October 2013

	First party	Second party
Candidate	Barry Collier	Brett Thomas
Party	Labor	Liberal
Popular vote	18,812	15,883
Percentage	46.5%	39.2%
Swing	▲24.2	▼21.5
TPP	55.1%	44.9%
TPP swing	▲26.1	▼26.1
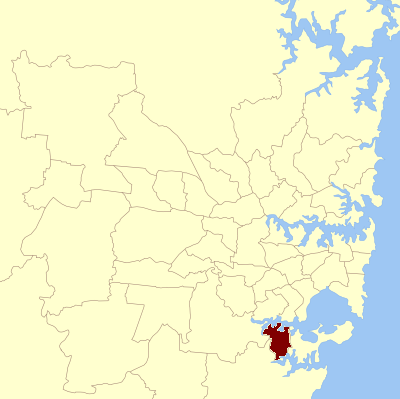
- Miranda in southern metropolitan Sydney.
MP before election
Graham Annesley
Liberal
Elected MP
Barry Collier
Labor

A by-election for the New South Wales Legislative Assembly seat of Miranda occurred on 19 October 2013. The by-election was triggered by the resignation of Graham Annesley (Liberal), which was announced on 28 August 2013. Barry Collier (Labor) won the seat with a 55 percent two-party vote from a 26-point two-party swing, the largest swing in New South Wales history.

== Background ==
The Liberal member for Miranda, Graham Annesley, resigned from the New South Wales Parliament and as Minister for Sport and Recreation on 28 August 2013 to take up the post of chief executive officer of the Gold Coast Titans rugby league team. Annesley in his resignation to Parliament said he never regarded himself as a politician and that there were many aspects of politics he did not care for and he has always felt more at home as a sports administrator.

A central Sutherland Shire electorate, Miranda crosses the peninsula between the Georges River and Port Hacking. It includes the suburbs of Como, Bonnet Bay, Oyster Bay, Kareela, Kirrawee, Gymea, Gymea Bay, Grays Point and parts of Sylvania, Miranda and Jannali. The seat's federal equivalent is in the western half of the Division of Cook.

Created in 1971, Miranda had traditionally been a Liberal electorate. It had only been won by Labor in landslide elections, two under Neville Wran in 1978 and 1981, and again under Bob Carr in 1999 and in 2003. According to ABC psephologist Antony Green, the seat should have been recovered by the Liberals in 2007 but was narrowly retained by Labor. Going into the 2011 election, Miranda was Labor's most marginal seat, with a 0.8 percent two-party margin. In the 2011 election, the Liberals won government in a landslide. In the process, they picked up a large enough swing in Miranda to turn it into a very safe Liberal seat on paper in one stroke, with a 21.0 percent two-party margin. There were 39 seats held by the Coalition on smaller margins.

== Campaign ==
Questions were raised over the Liberal-controlled Sutherland Shire Council's alleged property development favours in their draft Local Environmental Plan.

Internal Liberal Party polling conducted two weeks before the by-election produced a 54–46 lead to Labor indicating a 25-point two-party swing against the Liberal government, however a follow-up internal Liberal Party poll had the Liberals "marginally in front". Sportsbet offered $1.25 for the Liberals against $3.50 for Labor with Antony Green predicting a Liberal retain. Both major party leaders played down expectations of a win.

== Dates ==
Date	Event
20 September 2013	Writ of election issued by the Speaker of the Legislative Assembly and close of the electoral roll.
2 October 2013	Close of party nominations
3 October 2013	Close of independent nominations
8 October 2013	Pre-poll and iVote voting began
18 October 2013	Pre-poll and iVote voting closed
19 October 2013	Polling day, between the hours of 8 am and 6 pm
23 October 2013	Postal vote declaration closed

== Candidates ==
The six candidates in ballot paper order were:

Candidate nominations
Greens NSW	Murray Scott	Retired physicist, worked for AAEC and CSIRO at Lucas Heights.
Independent	Lisa Walters	Campaigned against a new rail timetable which cut the number of trains stopping at Como station.
Labor Party	Barry Collier	Miranda Labor MP 1999–2011.
Christian Democratic Party	George Capsis	Former Sutherland Shire Councillor 2008–2012 and Deputy Mayor 2011–2012, CDP upper house candidate federally in 2001 and 2004 and state in 2003.
Liberal Party	Brett Thomas	Former Sutherland Shire Councillor 1995–1999, Liberal candidate for Menai in 1999 and 2003.
	John Brett	Retired road and rail engineer, independent candidate for Miranda in 2007 on 1.6% and 2011 on 4.7% primary vote.

== Results ==
2013 Miranda by-election Saturday 19 October
Party	Candidate	Votes	%	±%
Labor	Barry Collier	18,812	46.5	+24.2
Liberal	Brett Thomas	15,883	39.2	−21.5
Christian Democrats	George Capsis	2,840	7.0	+3.5
Greens	Murray Scott	1,757	4.3	−4.4
Independent	Lisa Walters	842	2.1	+2.1
Independent	John Brett	342	0.8	−3.9
Total formal votes		40,476	98.0	+0.7
Informal votes		813	2.0	−0.7
Turnout		41,289	84.8	−10.0
Two-party-preferred result
Labor	Barry Collier	20,751	55.1	+26.1
Liberal	Brett Thomas	16,916	44.9	−26.1
Labor gain from Liberal		Swing	+26.1	

Labor won the seat with a two-party preferred swing of 26.1 percent, the largest by-election swing in the state's history, outdoing even the 2010 Penrith by-election result. Premier Barry O'Farrell claimed Annesley's "unexpected, mid-term resignation" as the reason for the loss and rejected claims of a backlash against the Liberal government. Labor's Collier said the major issues for local voters were overdevelopment in the Sutherland Shire, the frequent closure of fire stations (uniformed firefighters were at polling stations protesting against the Liberal government), cuts to TAFE, and poor transport services at the Jannali and Kogarah train stations. Labor leader John Robertson released a statement claiming there was a clear message to the Liberal government from Miranda voters, saying "The people of the shire have sent Barry O'Farrell the strongest of messages tonight ... in the last two-and-a-half years Barry O'Farrell and his government have taken families for granted ... Barry Collier was an outstanding local candidate who ran a strong community campaign, standing up for the Shire against Liberal cuts to services".

== See also ==
- Electoral results for the district of Miranda
- List of New South Wales state by-elections
