= Tim Walker (politician) =

Australian politician

Noel Douglas "Tim" Walker (25 December 1917 – 11 November 1986) was an Australian politician, elected as a member of the New South Wales Legislative Assembly.

Walker was born in Tamworth, New South Wales, Australia, and educated at Tamworth High School. He became a farmer and a policeman in 1940. He married Jessica Frances Farrow in January 1946 and had they had two sons. He later became a newsagent in Miranda from 1953 and director of Associated Newsagents' Co-operative Limited from about 1954. Walker was elected as the Liberal Party member for Sutherland in 1968 and on its abolition in 1971, Miranda until 1978. He died at Forster Keys.

New South Wales Legislative Assembly
Preceded by Tom Dalton	Member for Sutherland; 1968–1971	Succeeded by Abolished
Preceded by New seat	Member for Miranda; 1971–1978	Succeeded by Bill Robb
