= Bill Robb =

Australian politician

William Edward Robb (20 October 1927 – 23 January 2012) was an Australian politician, elected as a member of the New South Wales Legislative Assembly.

Robb was educated at Leichhardt and Sydney Technical Colleges and was a proprietor of a hairdressing business from 1952 to 1973. He married Heather in July 1950 and they had two sons. He worked in the New South Wales Department of Public Works from 1974 to 1978. Robb was the Labor Party member for Miranda from 1978 to 1984.

== Notes ==
New South Wales Legislative Assembly
Preceded by Tim Walker	Member for Miranda; 1978 – 1984	Succeeded by Ron Phillips
