= Ron Phillips (politician) =

Australian politician

Ronald Anthony Phillips AO (born 16 May 1949) is a former Australian politician, elected as a member of the New South Wales Legislative Assembly.

Phillips was born in Sydney and became accountant in the dairy, printing, mining, rubber plastics and stockbroking industries. He worked for Potter Partners, a stockbroking firm, for three years before his election to Parliament. He married Ann-Marie and they had one daughter and two sons. He represented the seat of Miranda for the Liberal Party from 1984 to 1999. He was Minister for Health Services Management from June 1991 until June 1992 and then Minister for Health until the defeat of the Fahey government in March 1995. He was then Deputy Leader of the Opposition until he lost his seat in 1999.

Phillips was appointed an Officer of the Order of Australia for distinguished service to community health and to the Parliament of New South Wales.

New South Wales Legislative Assembly
Preceded by Bill Robb	Member for Miranda; 1984–1999	Succeeded by Barry Collier
Political offices
New title	Minister for Hospital Management/ Minister for Health Services Management; 1991–1992	Post abolished
Preceded by John Hannaford	Minister for Health; 1992–1995	Succeeded by Andrew Refshauge
Preceded by Andrew Refshauge	Deputy Leader of the Opposition of New South Wales; 1995–1999	Succeeded by Barry O'Farrell
Party political offices
Preceded by Kerry Chikarovski	Deputy Leader of the Liberal Party of Australia (NSW Division); 1995–1999	Succeeded by Barry O'Farrell
