= Bob Christie (politician) =

Australian politician (1925–2020)

Robert William John "Bob" Christie (1 November 1925 – 2 March 2020) was an Australian politician. He was the Labor member for Seven Hills in the New South Wales Legislative Assembly from 1981 to 1991.

== Biography ==
Christie was educated at Lidcombe before becoming a moulder. He later became the national secretary of the Federated Moulders' (Metals) Union of Australia.

Active in the Labor Party, Christie was president of the Lalor Park Branch for 26 years and was an alderman on Blacktown City Council for six years, including a period as deputy mayor. In 1981, he was selected as the Labor candidate for the new seat of Seven Hills, and was elected without difficulty. He held the seat until its abolition in 1991, whereupon he retired from politics.

New South Wales Legislative Assembly
Preceded by New seat	Member for Seven Hills; 1981–1991	Succeeded by Abolished
