= Jo Haylen =

Australian politician

Jo Haylen MP
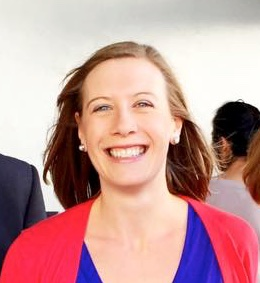

Member of the New South Wales Legislative Assembly for Summer Hill
- Incumbent
- Assumed office 28 March 2015
- Preceded by: Seat created

Minister for Transport
- In office 28 March 2023 – 6 February 2025
- Premier: Chris Minns
- Preceded by: David Elliott
- Succeeded by: John Graham

Personal details
- Born: Joanna Elizabeth Haylen; 1980 or 1981 (age 45–46)
- Party: NSW Labor
- Spouse: Garth Williams
- Education: University of Sydney
- Website: www.johaylen.com

Joanna Elizabeth Haylen is an Australian politician who was elected to the New South Wales Legislative Assembly as the member for Summer Hill for the Labor Party at the 2015 New South Wales state election. She was the state Minister for Transport from March 2023 to February 2025.

== Early life ==
Haylen grew up on Sydney's North Shore. She attended Artarmon Public and Willoughby Girls High School. She graduated from the University of Sydney with a Bachelor of Arts. In 2003, she was elected as the President of the University of Sydney Students' Representative Council.

Haylen is the great niece of former Federal Labor politician Les Haylen.

== Career ==
From 2012 to 2016, Haylen was a councillor on Marrickville Council. She was involved in a new dog walking area trial, a street parties program and investigation of a Sydney-wide bicycle share scheme.

From 2013 to 2014, Haylen served as youngest-ever female Mayor of Marrickville. She had previously worked as a director of administration in the office of then prime minister Julia Gillard, and as deputy chief of staff for then deputy prime minister, Anthony Albanese.

At the 2013 state redistribution, the seat of the Marrickville was abolished and was replaced with the seats of Newtown and Summer Hill. In November 2013, the sitting member for Marrickville, Carmel Tebbutt, announced she would be retiring at the 2015 state election. Haylen won pre-selection for Summer Hill. She was successful in the election spent five months as a member of the Select Committee on the Regulation of Brothels.

Haylen was re-elected in 2019 with a swing of 11.8 points, and was appointed as Shadow Minister for Active Transport, the Cost of Living, Seniors and Volunteers in the shadow Ministry of Jodi McKay.

In 2021, she became the Shadow Minister for Transport in the shadow Ministry of Chris Minns. At the 2023 New South Wales state election, Haylen retained her seat and was appointed the Minister for Transport on 26 March.

== Controversies ==
=== Transport for NSW secretary appointment ===
In July 2023, Haylen faced criticism and controversy regarding her failure to disclose a perceived conflict of interest in connection with the appointment of Josh Murray as Secretary of Transport for NSW. It came to light that Murray had made financial contributions to Haylen's election campaign for the 2023 New South Wales state election. Additionally, he had previously served as the chief of staff for former Labor Premier Morris Iemma.

During the appointment process, an external recruitment consulting agency involved in the short-listing stage assessed that Murray "had not demonstrated the level of operational complexity required for this role". Despite that assessment, Murray was short-listed for the position, with emails released to a parliamentary inquiry showing a reported intervention from Haylen's office. The appointment of Josh Murray as secretary drew criticism from the Opposition, prompting a parliamentary inquiry into the matter. Haylen maintained her support for the appointment, and received backing from Premier, Chris Minns.

=== Departmental liaison officer scandal ===
In October and November 2023, Haylen faced further controversy during budget estimates. It stemmed from allegations that a public service employee, Kieren Ash, who had been seconded to her office as a departmental liaison officer, was involved in political activities. The role of a departmental liaison officer traditionally entails being apolitical and facilitating communication between ministers and public service department staff. Ash faced accusations of organising a barbecue for NSW Labor volunteers following the 2023 state election and compiling a list of political reversals by the outgoing Coalition government. Ash had been the Labor candidate for Pittwater at the 2015 state election. Haylen denied knowing about Ash's political work and claimed to have only found out about it the week before the allegations were raised.

During the same period, Haylen's chief of staff, Scott Gartrell, resigned from his position. Haylen stated that Gartrell's departure had been planned for the end of the year.

Haylen consistently maintained that there was no impropriety from her office and continued to receive support from Premier Chris Minns, who rejected calls for her removal from her ministerial position.

=== Use of ministerial cars and drivers ===
In January 2025, Haylen was criticised after it emerged that she had ordered a taxpayer-funded ministerial driver and car to travel on a 446-kilometre round-trip from Sydney to her holiday home on the Central Coast, and chauffeur her and a group of friends including Minister Rose Jackson, to a winery for a birthday lunch on the Australia Day long weekend. Linda Silmalis at News Corp's Daily Telegraph broke the story after receiving a tip-off.

Despite claiming that she did not recall any other circumstances where her ministerial car and driver were used for her personal interests, it subsequently emerged that Haylen directed a driver to take her and her family to a Sunday lunch in the Blue Mountains in 2024, and regularly used the car and driver to transport her children from their holiday house to weekend sport. As of 3 February 2025, there were reports that Haylen had used a ministerial driver for a second extended winery trip.

At the time, ministerial cars could be used for private purposes under the rules. Usage was common, with Ryan Park, Michael Daley and Ron Hoenig also having utilised ministerial cars.

Haylen resigned as transport minister on 4 February 2025, taking effect on 6 February 2025.

Civic offices
Preceded by Victor Macri	Mayor of Marrickville; 2013–2014	Succeeded by Mark Gardiner
New South Wales Legislative Assembly
New district	Member for Summer Hill; 2015–present	Incumbent
Political offices
Preceded by David Elliott	Minister for Transport; 2023–2025	Succeeded by John Graham
