= Mark Taylor (Australian politician) =

Australian politician

Mark Taylor MP

Member of the New South Wales Legislative Assembly for Winston Hills
- Incumbent
- Assumed office 25 March 2023
- Preceded by: New seat

Member of the New South Wales Legislative Assembly for Seven Hills
- In office 28 March 2015 – 25 March 2023
- Preceded by: New seat
- Succeeded by: Seat abolished

Personal details
- Born: 28 October 1967 (age 59) Toongabbie, New South Wales, Australia
- Party: Liberal Party
- Occupation: Police officer
- Profession: Solicitor

Mark Owen Taylor (born 28 October 1967) is an Australian politician. He has been a Liberal Party member of the New South Wales Legislative Assembly since March 2015, initially representing the electorate of Seven Hills and later Winston Hills. He was previously a councillor of The Hills Shire.

== Early life and background ==
Taylor was born and raised in Toongabbie, Sydney. He was educated at Model Farms High School in Baulkham Hills and James Ruse Agricultural High School in Carlingford. After school, Taylor commenced studies in environmental science at the University of Western Sydney while working for the Ku-ring-gai Council. In 1988 he joined the Australian Federal Police. In 1992 he joined the New South Wales Police Force. He was appointed a police prosecutor in 1995 and was admitted as a solicitor in 2003.

== Political career ==
Taylor was elected as a councillor of The Hills Shire at the 2012 New South Wales local elections and represented North Ward until 2017. In April 2014 it was reported that Taylor had been endorsed as the Liberal candidate for the revived seat of Seven Hills at the state election the following year. Taylor subsequently went on to win the seat with an eight-point margin in 2015 and held it at a six-point margin in 2019 before it was abolished in the 2021 redistribution. Taylor registered to contest the new seat of Winston Hills at the 2023 election.

In 2026, Taylor announced that he would not recontest his seat at the 2027 election.

New South Wales Legislative Assembly
New seat	Member for Seven Hills; 2015–2023	Seat abolished
New seat	Member for Winston Hills; 2023–present	Incumbent
