= Graham Annesley =

Australian rugby league administrator and politician

Minister for Sport and Recreation
- In office 3 April 2011 – 28 August 2013
- Premier: Barry O'Farrell
- Preceded by: Kevin Greene
- Succeeded by: Gabrielle Upton

Member of the New South Wales Parliament for Miranda
- In office 26 March 2011 – 28 August 2013
- Preceded by: Barry Collier
- Succeeded by: Barry Collier
- Majority: 21.0% (2011)

Personal details
- Born: 26 May 1957 (age 69)
- Party: Liberal Party
- Domestic partner: Erica Clark
- Children: Two
- Occupation: Sport administrator

Graham Annesley (born 26 May 1957) is an Australian former politician. He was a member of the New South Wales Legislative Assembly representing Miranda for the Liberal Party from 2011 to 2013. From 3 April 2011 to 28 August 2013 he was the Minister for Sport and Recreation in the O'Farrell government.

Annesley was formerly chief executive officer of the Gold Coast Titans, chief operating officer of the National Rugby League (NRL) and a leading rugby league referee. He is currently the head of elite football operations for the NRL.

== Rugby league ==
Annesley commenced his rugby league career with the Parramatta District Rugby League Referees Association. Starting as a 13-year-old referee, Annesley also undertook later administrative roles in the Association, including Secretary (1979–1980) and President (1985–1988). He was elected as a Life Member of the Association in 1984.

Rising through the refereeing ranks, Annesley became a first grade referee in 1982. Between 1982 and 1997 he controlled 244 first-grade matches and six finals matches. He is ranked number 12 in the list of all-time first grade matches refereed.

Annesley's representative appointments include the 1994 State of Origin, six test matches and two city-country games.

Annesley's business career included appointments with DHL, McWilliams Wines, Totalisator Agency Board (TAB) and the Roads & Traffic Authority. He became a full-time sports administrator in 1995 as director of football for the NRL, promoted to chief operating officer in 2002.

Annesley is credited with introducing the video referee system in 1996.

== Politics ==
Pre-selected by the Liberal Party to contest Miranda at the 2007 state election, Annesley was defeated by the sitting Labor member Barry Collier by a margin of 603 votes. He again contested the seat at the March 2011 elections and was elected, receiving a swing of 21.8% in the traditionally Liberal seat, winning 71.0% of the vote on a two-party preferred basis. As Collier retired at the election, Annesley's main competitor was Therese Cook, representing Labor.

Annesley was subsequently appointed Minister for Sport and Recreation in the O'Farrell–Stoner coalition government. On 28 August 2013 he announced his resignation as Minister for Sport and Recreation and his intention to resign from Parliament to become CEO of the Gold Coast Titans, triggering a 2013 Miranda by-election on 19 October. In his resignation speech to parliament, Annesley said he never regarded himself as a politician and that there were many aspects of politics he did not care for. He said that he had always felt more at home as a sports administrator.

In October 2013, Annesley said that he arranged for Telstra to put in mobile reception, six months prior and without charge, for a new property at Yowie Bay he bought with his wife, claiming he couldn't do his job as a minister otherwise.

== Post-politics ==
Since 2019, Annesley has been the NRL head of elite football operations. Away from rugby league, Annesley is an Australia Day ambassador for Liverpool Shire Council.

Political offices
Preceded by Kevin Greene	Minister for Sport and Recreation; 2011–2013	Succeeded by Gabrielle Upton
New South Wales Legislative Assembly
Preceded by Barry Collier	Member for Miranda; 2011–2013	Succeeded by Barry Collier
