= Electoral district of Summer Hill =

State electoral district of New South Wales, Australia

Summer Hill New South Wales—Legislative Assembly
- Interactive map of district boundaries from the 2023 state election
- State: New South Wales
- Created: 2015
- MP: Jo Haylen
- Party: Labor Party
- Namesake: Summer Hill
- Electors: 58949 (2025)
- Area: 16.4 km^{2} (6.3 sq mi)
- Demographic: Inner-metropolitan
Electorates around Summer Hill:
Drummoyne	Drummoyne	Balmain
Strathfield	Summer Hill	Newtown
Canterbury	Rockdale	Heffron

Summer Hill is an electoral district of the Legislative Assembly in New South Wales. It is represented by Jo Haylen of the Labor Party.

== History ==
Summer Hill is one of two new electorates (the other being Newtown) created in place of the abolished Marrickville for the 2015 state election. It takes its territory from areas previously belonging to the districts of Balmain, Canterbury, Marrickville and Strathfield.

== Geography ==
Summer Hill is an urban electorate in Sydney's inner west centred on the suburb of Summer Hill from which it takes its name. On its current boundaries, it also includes the suburbs of Ashbury, Ashfield, Dulwich Hill, Haberfield, Lewisham and Marrickville.

== Members for Summer Hill ==
Member	Party	Term
Jo Haylen	Labor	2015–present

== Election results ==
2023 New South Wales state election: Summer Hill
Party	Candidate	Votes	%	±%
Labor	Jo Haylen	25,922	52.1	+5.7
Greens	Izabella Antoniou	12,596	25.3	+4.9
Liberal	Bowen Cheng	8,340	16.8	−7.2
Animal Justice	Sandra Haddad	1,567	3.1	+0.8
Sustainable Australia	Michael Swan	1,333	2.7	+1.3
Total formal votes		49,758	97.5	+0.5
Informal votes		1,277	2.5	−0.5
Turnout		51,035	88.5	+0.7
Notional two-party-preferred count
Labor	Jo Haylen	37,057	79.8	+8.2
Liberal	Bowen Cheng	9,373	20.2	−8.2
Two-candidate-preferred result
Labor	Jo Haylen	28,598	66.3	−0.2
Greens	Izabella Antoniou	14,536	33.7	+0.2
Labor hold		Swing	−0.2	
