= Eleni Petinos =

Australian politician

Eleni Petinos MP

Minister for Small Business
- In office 21 December 2021 – 31 July 2022
- Premier: Dominic Perrottet
- Preceded by: Damien Tudehope (as Minister for Finance and Small Business
- Succeeded by: Victor Dominello

Minister for Fair Trading
- In office 21 December 2021 – 31 July 2022
- Premier: Dominic Perrottet
- Preceded by: Kevin Anderson (as Minister for Better Regulation and Innovation)
- Succeeded by: Victor Dominello

Member of the New South Wales Parliament for Miranda
- Incumbent
- Assumed office 28 March 2015
- Preceded by: Barry Collier

Personal details
- Born: 1985 or 1986 (age 40–41)
- Party: Liberal Party
- Education: University of New South Wales

Eleni Marie Petinos is an Australian state politician in New South Wales. She served as the Minister for Small Business and the Minister for Fair Trading in the Perrottet ministry from December 2021 until her Ministry was ceased on 31 July 2022 by NSW Premier Dominic Perrottet after allegations of her mistreatment and bullying of staff came to light. Petinos was elected to the New South Wales Legislative Assembly as the member for Miranda for the Liberal Party at the 2015 New South Wales state election.

Petinos is currently a member of Kellie Sloane's Shadow Ministry, serving as Shadow Minister in the Sport and Finance portfolios.

Petinos graduated from the University of New South Wales with a bachelor of jurisprudence, bachelor of laws and a graduate diploma of legal practice. Before her election to parliament, Petinos was a tax lawyer, a member of the Liberal Party state executive and an adviser to Senator Concetta Fierravanti-Wells. She was a member of the Liberal right faction when pre-selected, but switched to the moderates faction after the 2015 election, encouraged by her mentor, Sutherland Shire councillor Kent Johns. As a result, ahead of the next state election she faced a preselection challenge, supported by the right faction, which was not successful.

Petinos was the chair of the Legislative Assembly Committee on Transport and Infrastructure between April 2017 and March 2019. She was a parliamentary secretary for transport and roads from April 2019 until December 2021. In December 2021, Petinos was sworn in as the Minister for Small Business and as the Minister for Fair Trading in the Perrottet ministry, serving as a minister for seven months prior to her dismissal. She denied engaging in bullying but apologised if her behaviour caused offence or discomfort, and indicated her intention to stay on in politics as a state member of parliament despite the controversy that led to her sacking.

The claims made against her included that she had "relentlessly bullied" ministerial staff, calling some "retarded" and "stupid", and hyperbolically threatened to "kill" them. Media reports suggested the premier's decision was prompted by similar bullying complaints levelled against the then minister from within the public service.

After Petinos' ousting, media reports suggested some government MP's thought the premier had acted too hastily in removing her, given the allegations against her were unproven and that she denied the claims. They suggested Petinos was a victim of the fact the government was under pressure over unrelated scandals and that she would ordinarily have been given greater protection. The Labor opposition contrasted the haste involved in Petinos' removal with the Premier's initial reluctance to take action against Stuart Ayres.

After her dismissal from the Ministry, claims emerged that the NSW Building Commissioner had resigned because of a "problematic" relationship with Petinos. The New South Wales Legislative Council investigated the circumstances of Petinos' meeting with a construction company which was employing former deputy premier John Barilaro and had been the subject of stop-work orders made by the Building Commissioner. Petinos denied suggestions she interfered with the issuing of the orders. It was anticipated the Commissioner's secret letter would be released as part of the Legislative Council's examination of the issue.

Petinos had earlier been involved in other controversies relating to personal conduct, including claims she had an affair with a Liberal parliamentary colleague Matt Kean, and had vomited in the back of then deputy premier John Barilaro's chauffeured government car after a rugby league State of Origin match. She subsequently paid for the costs of cleaning the ministerial car.

New South Wales Legislative Assembly
Preceded by Barry Collier	Member for Miranda; 2015–present	Incumbent
Political offices
Preceded by Damien Tudehope as Minister for Finance and Small Business	Minister for Small Business; 2021–2022	Succeeded by Victor Dominello
Preceded by Kevin Anderson as Minister for Better Regulation and Innovation	Minister for Fair Trading; 2021–2022	Succeeded by Victor Dominello
