= Electoral district of Miranda =

Miranda
- Interactive map of district boundaries from the 2023 state election
- Created: 1971
- MP: Eleni Petinos
- Party: Liberal Party
- Namesake: Miranda
- Electors: 54,949 (2019)
- Area: 38.87 km^{2} (15.0 sq mi)
- Demographic: Inner metropolitan
- Coordinates: 34°1′38″S 151°5′1″E
Electorates around Miranda:
East Hills	Oatley	Rockdale
Holsworthy	Miranda	Cronulla
Heathcote	Cronulla; Heathcote	Cronulla

Miranda is an electoral district of the Legislative Assembly in the Australian state of New South Wales. It is represented by Eleni Petinos of the Liberal Party.

Miranda is located in the north of Sutherland Shire on the south shore of Georges River.

== Geography ==
On its current boundaries, Miranda takes in the suburbs of Alfords Point, Bonnet Bay, Como, Gymea, Illawong, Jannali, Kangaroo Point, Kareela, Kirrawee, Miranda, Oyster Bay, Sylvania, Sylvania Waters, Taren Point and parts of Caringbah and Sutherland.

== History ==
Created in 1971, Miranda had traditionally been a Liberal electorate, being won by Labor only at landslide elections, two under Neville Wran in 1978 and 1981, and again under Bob Carr in 1999 and 2003. According to ABC psephologist Antony Green, the seat should have been recovered by the Liberals in 2007 but was narrowly retained by Labor. On a margin of 0.8 percent it was the Labor government's most marginal seat. In 2011 the Liberals won government in a landslide, and the seat of Miranda on a very safe 21.0 percent margin, with 39 seats held by the Coalition on smaller margins.

The seat was made vacant following the resignation of Liberal MP Graham Annesley. The 2013 Miranda by-election was conducted on 19 October, Labor's Barry Collier won the seat with a two-party swing of 26 percent in the largest by-election swing in the state's history. He did not stand for re-election at the 2015 NSW State election and the seat was subsequently won by the Liberal Party's Eleni Petinos.

== Members for Miranda ==
Member	Party	Term
Tim Walker	Liberal	1971–1978
Bill Robb	Labor	1978–1984
Ron Phillips	Liberal	1984–1999
Barry Collier	Labor	1999–2011
Graham Annesley	Liberal	2011–2013
Barry Collier	Labor	2013–2015
Eleni Petinos	Liberal	2015–present

== Election results ==
2023 New South Wales state election: Miranda
Party	Candidate	Votes	%	±%
Liberal	Eleni Petinos	24,017	45.4	−8.8
Labor	Simon Earle	19,781	37.4	+10.2
Greens	Martin Moore	3,842	7.3	+0.5
Independent	Gaye Cameron	2,712	5.1	+5.1
Sustainable Australia	Nick Hughes	2,512	4.8	+2.8
Total formal votes		52,864	97.1	−0.3
Informal votes		1,601	2.9	+0.3
Turnout		54,465	91.1	+1.4
Two-party-preferred result
Liberal	Eleni Petinos	25,503	52.3	−12.1
Labor	Simon Earle	23,214	47.7	+12.1
Liberal hold		Swing	−12.1	
