= Barry Collier (politician) =

Australian politician

Barry Collier OAM

Member of the New South Wales Legislative Assembly for Miranda
- In office 19 October 2013 – 6 March 2015
- Preceded by: Graham Annesley
- Succeeded by: Eleni Petinos
- In office 27 March 1999 – 4 March 2011
- Preceded by: Ron Phillips
- Succeeded by: Graham Annesley
Parliamentary Secretary 2007–2011
Parliamentary Secretary Assisting the Attorney-General
In office 6 January 2010 – 26 March 2011
Minister	John Hatzistergos
In office 8 May 2007 – 4 December 2009
Minister	John Hatzistergos
Parliamentary Secretary Assisting the Treasurer
In office 6 January 2010 – 26 March 2011
Minister	Michael Costa; Eric Roozendaal
Parliamentary Secretary Assisting the Minister for Ports and Waterways
In office 28 October 2010 – 26 March 2011
Minister	Eric Roozendaal
Parliamentary Secretary Assisting the Minister for Corrective Services
In office 20 October 2009 – 4 December 2009
Minister	John Robertson
Parliamentary Secretary Assisting the Minister for Justice
In office 8 May 2007 – 20 October 2009
Minister	John Hatzistergos
Shadow Ministerial offices 2013–2014
Shadow Minister for Water
In office 11 December 2013 – 27 March 2014
Leader	John Robertson
Preceded by	Walt Secord
Succeeded by	Peter Primrose
Shadow Minister for Sport and Recreation
In office 11 December 2013 – 27 March 2014
Leader	John Robertson
Preceded by	Linda Burney
Succeeded by	Guy Zangari

Councillor for Sutherland Shire for B Ward
- In office 2016–2021
- Preceded by: Phil Blight
- Succeeded by: Louise Sullivan

Personal details
- Born: Barry Joseph Collier; 5 December 1949 (age 76) Camperdown, New South Wales, Australia
- Party: Labor Party
- Spouse: Jeanette
- Education: University of New South Wales; University of Sydney
- Occupation: Teacher, solicitor and barrister

Barry Joseph Collier OAM (born 5 December 1949) is an Australian politician. He was a Labor Party member of the New South Wales Legislative Assembly from 1999 to 2011 and from 2013 to 2015, representing the electorate of Miranda. Collier retired at the 2011 election, but contested and won a 2013 by-election when his successor, Liberal Graham Annesley, resigned. Collier then retired a second time at the 2015 election. In September 2016, Collier was elected to Sutherland Shire Council, serving as a Councillor representing B Ward.

He was awarded the Medal of the Order of Australia (OAM) in the 2017 Australia Day Honours List for services to the Parliament of New South Wales, to the law and to education.

== Teaching and legal careers ==
From 1973 to 1989, Collier was a high school economics teacher with the NSW Education Department. During his teaching career, Collier also served as NSW economics curriculum consultant and chairman of the NSW Higher School Certificate Economics Examination Committee. He wrote three textbooks and accompanying workbooks for high school students in Years 11 and 12 entitled Introducing Economics, published by Jacaranda-Wiley.

From 1989 to 1999, he practiced criminal law as a solicitor with both the Office of the Director of Public Prosecutions and the Legal Aid Commission of NSW, and later as a barrister in private practice. As a Legal Aid solicitor, Collier appeared in the 1993 ABC Television reality local court documentary So Help Me God.

== Political career ==
Collier was elected to the New South Wales Legislative Assembly in the 1999 NSW state election defeating Deputy Leader of the Liberal Party, Ron Phillips who had held the seat of Miranda for 15 years.'From 2007 until his retirement from Parliament in 2011, he served as Parliamentary Secretary Assisting the Attorney General & Minister for Justice, Assisting the Minister for Corrective Services, Assisting the Treasurer and Assisting the Minister for Ports & Waterways.

Collier made over 700 speeches in the NSW Legislative Assembly.

Collier is notable for switching from the right faction to the left faction in 2005 and causing the Government to back down on a proposal to resurrect the long-standing plan to build the Southern Freeway (or F6) through his electorate. He returned to the right faction of the Labor Party in September 2008.

On 21 September 2010 Collier announced that he would not contest the 2011 state election. He gave his valedictory speech in the Legislative Assembly on 26 November 2010. In 2013, Collier nominated to contest Miranda once again in the by-election triggered by the resignation of his successor, Graham Annesley and won a surprise victory, returning to Parliament on the back of a 27 per cent swing- the largest swing ever recorded at a New South Wales by-election

In 2013, Collier withdrew his opposition to the F6 extension, saying he would support it if it was built as a tunnel under the Sutherland Shire.

In Opposition, Collier served as Shadow Minister for Water and as Shadow Minister for Sport and Recreation He did not recontest Miranda at the 2015 election, instead marking his second retirement from the New South Wales Parliament.

Collier decided to run for Sutherland Shire Council in September 2016 and became a councillor for B Ward with Labor gaining a 20 percent swing on the primary vote He did not seek re-election in 2021.

== Political hiatus and personal life ==
After temporarily leaving politics, Collier returned to legal practice as a barrister.

In September 2012, Collier was appointed by the NSW Government as a trustee of the newly created Rookwood General Cemetery Reserve Trust Board. He resigned from the Board in September 2013 to contest the Miranda by-election.

Collier is married with two children and has lived in Sutherland Shire since 1972.

== Literature ==
Collier has written and published several poems including "Millennium Drought" for which he won the National Henry Lawson Literary Society Award for Free Verse in 2017 and "Anzac Day 2018: Let Us Also Remember."

In November 2018, Collier published his political memoir, Collier For Miranda: The 1999 Labor Campaign. The book details his grassroots campaign as an unknown, first-time Labor candidate to win the southern Sydney seat which had been held by the Liberal Party for 15 years.

In July 2025, Collier published 'Poems of Life, Of Love and Passing. This is his first book of poetry and contains 62 poems. Collier is critical of modern poetry, believing it 'is a total turnoff for most Australians.'

New South Wales Legislative Assembly
Preceded by Ron Phillips	Member for Miranda; 1999–2011	Succeeded by Graham Annesley
Preceded by Graham Annesley	Member for Miranda; 2013–2015	Succeeded by Eleni Petinos
