= Electoral district of Seven Hills =

State electoral district of New South Wales, Australia

Seven Hills New South Wales—Legislative Assembly
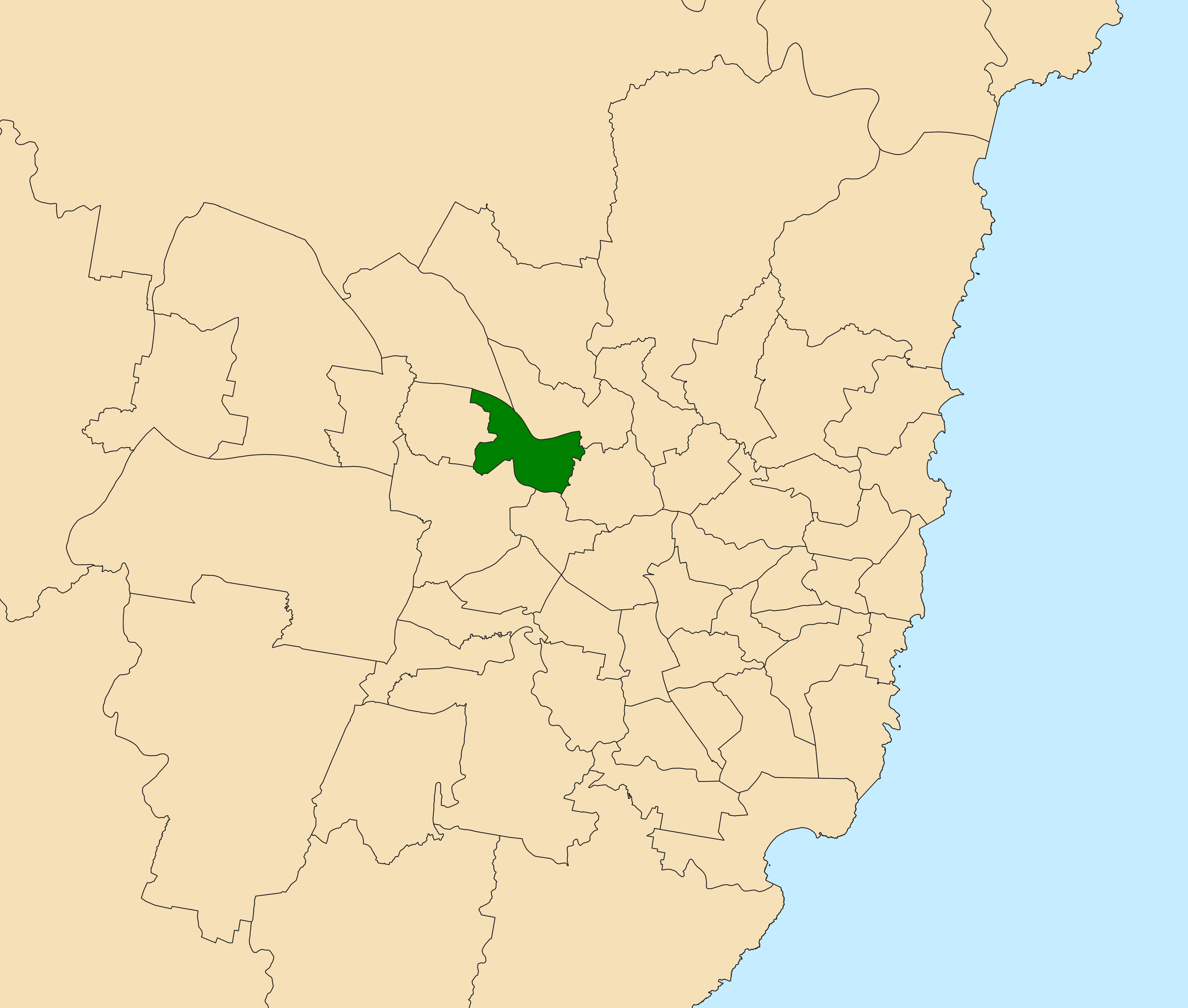
- Location within Sydney
- State: New South Wales
- Dates current: 1981–1991; 2015–2023
- Party: Liberal Party
- Namesake: Seven Hills
- Electors: 53,676 (2019)
- Area: 32.09 km^{2} (12.4 sq mi)
Electorates around Seven Hills:
Riverstone	Baulkham Hills	Baulkham Hills
Blacktown	Seven Hills	Parramatta
Prospect	Granville	Parramatta

Seven Hills was an electoral district of the Legislative Assembly in the Australian state of New South Wales. It is represented by Mark Taylor of the Liberal Party.

It includes the suburbs of Constitution Hill, Northmead, Old Toongabbie and Winston Hills and parts of Seven Hills, Baulkham Hills, Blacktown, Kings Langley, Glenwood, Lalor Park, Pendle Hill, Prospect, Toongabbie, Wentworthville and Westmead.

== History ==
Seven Hills was established for the first time in 1981 but it was abolished in 1991. It was recreated from 2015 as a result of the 2013 redistribution. It is named after and including the Sydney suburb of Seven Hills.

The second incarnation of Seven Hills largely consisted of areas from the abolished seat of Toongabbie, which had historically been a Labor stronghold before Labor's near-meltdown in west Sydney in the 2011 election. In the election, the Labor margin was reduced from a comfortably safe 14.5 percent to an extremely marginal 0.3 percent. The transfer of traditionally pro-Labor voting areas to Blacktown and Prospect, and the addition of equally pro-Liberal areas from Baulkham Hills significantly altered the political composition of the electorate, giving the Liberals a notional margin of 8.8 percent–on the stronger side of fairly safe. The sitting member for Toongabbie was former Labor Premier Nathan Rees, who concluded the new Seven Hills was impossible to hold and retired at the 2015 election.

As a result of a redistribution in 2021, Seven Hills was abolished at the 2023 election and largely replaced by Winston Hills.

== Members for Seven Hills ==
First Incarnation (1981–1991)
Member	Party	Period
Bob Christie	Labor	1981–1991
Second Incarnation (2015–present)
Mark Taylor	Liberal	2015–2023

== Election results ==
2019 New South Wales state election: Seven Hills
Party	Candidate	Votes	%	±%
Liberal	Mark Taylor	23,548	50.13	+0.44
Labor	Durga Owen	16,909	35.99	+3.45
Greens	Damien Atkins	3,038	6.47	−0.66
Independent	Alan Sexton	1,844	3.93	+3.93
Sustainable Australia	Eric Claus	863	1.84	+1.84
Conservatives	Jude D'Cruz	775	1.65	+1.65
Total formal votes		46,977	96.76	+0.63
Informal votes		1,572	3.24	−0.63
Turnout		48,549	90.45	−1.35
Two-party-preferred result
Liberal	Mark Taylor	24,518	56.36	−2.39
Labor	Durga Owen	18,988	43.64	+2.39
Liberal hold		Swing	−2.39	
