= Electoral district of Toongabbie =

Former state electoral district of New South Wales, Australia

Toongabbie New South Wales—Legislative Assembly
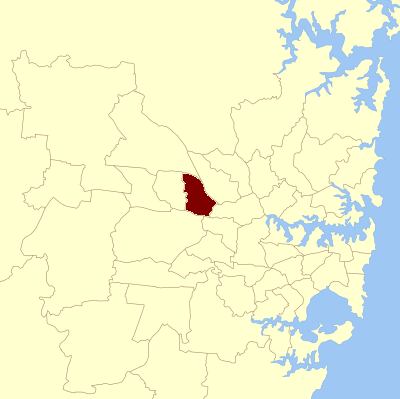
- Location within Sydney.
- State: New South Wales
- Created: 2004
- Abolished: 2013
- MP: Nathan Rees
- Party: Labor
- Namesake: Toongabbie

Toongabbie was an electoral district of the Legislative Assembly in the Australian state of New South Wales, created at the 2004 redistribution of electoral districts largely replacing the abolished district of Wentworthville. It was contested for the first time in the 2007 general election and abolished in the 2013 redistribution, largely replaced by Seven Hills. Its only member was a former Premier of New South Wales, Nathan Rees from the Labor Party.

== Members for Toongabbie ==
| Member | Party | Term |
|---|---|---|
| Nathan Rees | Labor | 2007–2015 |

== Election results ==
2011 New South Wales state election: Toongabbie
| Party | Candidate | Votes | % | ±% |
|---|---|---|---|---|
| Labor | Nathan Rees | 18,340 | 41.2 | −10.5 |
| Liberal | Kirsty Lloyd | 17,889 | 40.2 | +12.6 |
| Greens | Len Hobbs | 2,367 | 5.3 | −1.5 |
| Shooters and Fishers | Peter Johnson | 2,346 | 5.3 | +5.3 |
| Christian Democrats | Brendon Prentice | 2,016 | 4.5 | −3.4 |
| Independent | Michele Read | 942 | 2.1 | +2.1 |
| Independent | Ashok Kumar | 624 | 1.4 | +1.4 |
| Total formal votes | | 44,524 | 96.4 | +0.4 |
| Informal votes | | 1,671 | 3.6 | −0.4 |
| Turnout | | 46,195 | 93.9 | −2.0 |
Two-party-preferred result
| Labor | Nathan Rees | 19,989 | 50.3 | −14.2 |
| Liberal | Kirsty Lloyd | 19,784 | 49.7 | +14.2 |
| Labor hold | | Swing | −14.2 | |
