= No Land Tax Campaign =

Australian political party

The No Land Tax Campaign was a minor Australian political party formed prior to the 2015 New South Wales state election. It was formed in opposition to the levying of land tax, which in New South Wales applies to investment properties and holiday homes. The party achieved 1.90% of Legislative Council and 2.02% of Legislative Assembly votes at the election, but its failure to honour a promise to 3,600 workers to pay them $30 an hour ultimately led to legal trouble for the party.

The party letterboxed homes in some parts of New South Wales with a flyer bearing the state's coat of arms, and advertising a website "electionwork.com.au". The website offered $30 an hour to "reliable, enthusiastic people" to hand out flyers and approach voters — bonuses were offered if candidates achieved certain vote levels. The Electoral Commissioner, Colin Barry, commented that in 30 years, he had never seen a situation like it: "I'm not aware of any political party paying people to hand out material on election day. This was a very novel approach to say the least."

Through the ensuing months, Peter Jones, the party secretary, repeatedly promised to pay the 3,600 workers, blaming delays on various administrative and other causes. However, no money was paid and the party's website was taken offline. In August 2015, following an investigation which commenced in May, the Fair Work Ombudsman announced that they were taking legal action against Jones and the party, accusing them of a lack of co-operation. On 12 December 2017, the Federal Circuit Court fined Jones $13,315 and the party $67,575. Jones admitted contravening the workplace laws, but was criticised by the judge for his arrogant attitude and lack of remorse.

The party was registered with the NSW Electoral Commission in March 2014, and deregistered on 15 July 2015.

The party was also registered under the Associations Incorporation Act 2009 (NSW) and was deregistered on 27 August 2025.

== See also ==
- Fair Land Tax – Tax Party
