= Electoral results for the district of Holsworthy =

Election results for Holsworthy, New South Wales, Australia

Holsworthy, an electoral district of the Legislative Assembly in the Australian state of New South Wales, was created in 2015, largely replacing Menai.

== Members for Holsworthy ==
Election	Member	Party
2015	Melanie Gibbons	Liberal
2019	Melanie Gibbons	Liberal
2023	Tina Ayyad	Liberal

== Election results ==
=== Elections in the 2020s ===
==== 2023 ====
2023 New South Wales state election: Holsworthy
Party	Candidate	Votes	%	±%
Liberal	Tina Ayyad	20,449	41.9	−5.2
Labor	Mick Maroney	19,284	39.5	+4.4
One Nation	James Ingarfill	4,165	8.5	+1.5
Greens	Chris Kerle	2,719	5.6	+0.9
Independent	Deborah Swinbourn	2,174	4.5	+4.5
Total formal votes		48,791	95.7	0.0
Informal votes		2,182	4.3	+0.0
Turnout		50,973	87.8	−1.5
Two-party-preferred result
Liberal	Tina Ayyad	22,359	50.4	−5.6
Labor	Mick Maroney	22,028	49.6	+5.6
Liberal hold		Swing	−5.6	

=== Elections in the 2010s ===
==== 2019 ====
2019 New South Wales state election: Holsworthy
Party	Candidate	Votes	%	±%
Liberal	Melanie Gibbons	21,481	44.53	−4.99
Labor	Charishma Kaliyanda	18,152	37.63	+1.18
One Nation	Michael Byrne	3,905	8.09	+8.09
Greens	Chris Kerle	2,191	4.54	+0.04
Animal Justice	Gae Constable	1,901	3.94	+3.94
Liberal Democrats	Roland Barber	614	1.27	+1.27
Total formal votes		48,244	95.53	+0.45
Informal votes		2,256	4.47	−0.45
Turnout		50,500	89.59	−1.70
Two-party-preferred result
Liberal	Melanie Gibbons	22,861	53.29	−3.41
Labor	Charishma Kaliyanda	20,042	46.71	+3.41
Liberal hold		Swing	−3.41	

==== 2015 ====
2015 New South Wales state election: Holsworthy
Party	Candidate	Votes	%	±%
Liberal	Melanie Gibbons	23,336	49.5	+2.2
Labor	Charishma Kaliyanda	17,178	36.4	+6.0
Greens	Signe Westerberg	2,123	4.5	−1.4
Christian Democrats	Tony Maka	1,909	4.1	−1.5
	Michael Byrne	1,407	3.0	+3.0
No Land Tax	Adrian Atelj	1,180	2.5	+2.5
Total formal votes		47,133	95.1	+0.0
Informal votes		2,438	4.9	−0.0
Turnout		49,571	91.3	+1.9
Two-party-preferred result
Liberal	Melanie Gibbons	24,551	56.7	−4.0
Labor	Charishma Kaliyanda	18,749	43.3	+4.0
Liberal notional hold		Swing	−4.0	

Holsworthy was a new seat largely replacing the abolished district of Menai. Melanie Gibbons (Liberal) was the member for Menai.
