= Post-election pendulum for the 2019 New South Wales state election =

The following is a Mackerras pendulum for the 2019 New South Wales state election.

"Safe" seats require a swing of over 10 per cent to change, "fairly safe" seats require a swing of between 6 and 10 per cent, while "marginal" seats require a swing of less than 6 per cent.

All margins are Coalition vs. Labor unless specified otherwise.

== Margins by party ==
Liberal/National seats (48)
Marginal
East Hills	Wendy Lindsay	LIB	0.5%
Penrith	Stuart Ayres	LIB	1.3%
Dubbo	Dugald Saunders	NAT	2.0% v IND
Upper Hunter	Dave Layzell (Note: Dave Layzell was elected to the district of Upper Hunter in the 2021 by-election after the resignation of Michael Johnsen.)	NAT	2.5% (Note: While the post-2019 margin is 2.5%, the results of the 2021 Upper Hunter state by-election is a margin of 5.8% for the National Party of Australia – NSW.)
Holsworthy	Melanie Gibbons	LIB	3.2%
Goulburn	Wendy Tuckerman	LIB	3.7%
Heathcote	Lee Evans	LIB	4.9%
Tweed	Geoff Provest	NAT	4.9%
Wollondilly	Nathaniel Smith	LIB	5.5% v IND
Fairly safe
Riverstone	Kevin Conolly	LIB	6.3%
Seven Hills	Mark Taylor	LIB	6.3%
Bega	Andrew Constance	LIB	6.9%
Camden	Peter Sidgreaves	LIB	7.5%
Myall Lakes	Stephen Bromhead	NAT	9.1%
Safe
Coffs Harbour	Gurmesh Singh	NAT	10.3% v IND
Oatley	Mark Coure	LIB	10.5%
South Coast	Shelley Hancock	LIB	10.5%
Parramatta	Geoff Lee	LIB	10.6%
North Shore	Felicity Wilson	LIB	11.1% v IND
Mulgoa	Tanya Davies	LIB	11.3%
Monaro	John Barilaro	NAT	11.6%
Kiama	Gareth Ward	LIB	12.0%
Terrigal	Adam Crouch	LIB	12.3%
Epping	Dominic Perrottet	LIB	12.3%
Ryde	Victor Dominello	LIB	12.3%
Manly	James Griffin	LIB	12.9% v GRN
Lane Cove	Anthony Roberts	LIB	14.3%
Clarence	Chris Gulaptis	NAT	14.4%
Miranda	Eleni Petinos	LIB	14.5%
Oxley	Melinda Pavey	NAT	14.8%
Drummoyne	John Sidoti	LIB	15.0%
Albury	Justin Clancy	LIB	15.9%
Hornsby	Matt Kean	LIB	16.3%
Hawkesbury	Robyn Preston	LIB	17.4%
Bathurst	Paul Toole	NAT	17.9%
Baulkham Hills	David Elliott	LIB	18.6%
Vaucluse	Gabrielle Upton	LIB	19.3% v GRN
Cronulla	Mark Speakman	LIB	19.6%
Port Macquarie	Leslie Williams	NAT	20.2%
Ku-ring-gai	Alister Henskens	LIB	20.5%
Pittwater	Rob Stokes	LIB	20.8% v GRN
Wakehurst	Brad Hazzard	LIB	21.0%
Willoughby	Gladys Berejiklian	LIB	21.0%
Tamworth	Kevin Anderson	NAT	21.1% v IND
Castle Hill	Ray Williams	LIB	24.6%
Davidson	Jonathan O'Dea	LIB	25.2% v GRN
Cootamundra	Steph Cooke	NAT	27.1%
Northern Tablelands	Adam Marshall	NAT	32.8%

Labor seats (36)
Marginal
Lismore	Janelle Saffin	ALP	1.3%
Coogee	Marjorie O'Neill	ALP	1.6%
Kogarah	Chris Minns	ALP	1.7%
Strathfield	Jodi McKay	ALP	5.0%
The Entrance	David Mehan	ALP	5.2%
Port Stephens	Kate Washington	ALP	5.8%
Fairly safe
Londonderry	Prue Car	ALP	6.5%
Gosford	Liesl Tesch	ALP	7.3%
Granville	Julia Finn	ALP	7.6%
Maroubra	Michael Daley	ALP	8.5%
Auburn	Lynda Voltz	ALP	9.1%
Rockdale	Steve Kamper	ALP	9.6%
Safe
Swansea	Yasmin Catley	ALP	10.6%
Prospect	Hugh McDermott	ALP	10.7%
Charlestown	Jodie Harrison	ALP	12.4%
Wyong	David Harris	ALP	12.5%
Cabramatta	Nick Lalich	ALP	12.9% vs IND
Canterbury	Sophie Cotsis	ALP	13.0%
Maitland	Jenny Aitchison	ALP	13.2%
Bankstown	Tania Mihailuk	ALP	13.8%
Macquarie Fields	Anoulack Chanthivong	ALP	14.8%
Blue Mountains	Trish Doyle	ALP	14.9%
Heffron	Ron Hoenig	ALP	15.1%
Mount Druitt	Edmond Atalla	ALP	16.4%
Liverpool	Paul Lynch	ALP	16.7%
Campbelltown	Greg Warren	ALP	17.0%
Blacktown	Stephen Bali	ALP	17.7%
Newcastle	Tim Crakanthorp	ALP	17.7%
Fairfield	Guy Zangari	ALP	17.9%
Shellharbour	Anna Watson	ALP	18.3%
Cessnock	Clayton Barr	ALP	19.3%
Keira	Ryan Park	ALP	19.8%
Wollongong	Paul Scully	ALP	21.4%
Summer Hill	Jo Haylen	ALP	22.3%
Lakemba	Jihad Dib	ALP	22.4%
Wallsend	Sonia Hornery	ALP	25.4%
Crossbench seats (9)
Murray	Helen Dalton	SFF	3.5% vs NAT
Ballina	Tamara Smith	GRN	5.4% vs NAT
Barwon	Roy Butler	SFF	6.6% vs NAT
Balmain	Jamie Parker	GRN	10.0% vs ALP
Sydney	Alex Greenwich	IND	11.8% vs LIB
Newtown	Jenny Leong	GRN	13.8% vs ALP
Orange	Philip Donato	SFF	15.2% vs NAT
Wagga Wagga	Joe McGirr	IND	15.5% vs NAT
Lake Macquarie	Greg Piper	IND	22.1% vs ALP
