= Women in the New South Wales Legislative Assembly =

There have been 97 women in the New South Wales Legislative Assembly since its establishment in 1856. Women have had the right to vote in the assembly since 1902 and the right to stand as a candidate since 1918.

The first successful candidate for the Legislative Assembly was Millicent Preston-Stanley, who was elected as a Nationalist representative for the multi-member electorate of Eastern Suburbs in 1925, but only lasted one term before being defeated. Fourteen years later, Mary Quirk held the seat of Balmain for Labor after the death of her husband, becoming the first Labor woman in the Assembly. However, successful women candidates in the Legislative Assembly remained few and far between until the 1980s.

In the early 1980s, women began to break through into senior positions in the state; Janice Crosio became the first woman to serve as a minister in state parliament, serving in the Wran Labor ministry, and she was followed on the conservative side of politics by Rosemary Foot, who served as the deputy leader of the Liberal Party for a time. In 1996, Liberal Kerry Chikarovski became the first woman to lead a major party in New South Wales, although she was deposed in 2003.

In 2009, Labor's Kristina Keneally became the first woman to serve as Premier of New South Wales. Both the offices of Premier and Deputy Premier were held by women from 2009 until 2011, the first in Australian history. In 2011, Shelley Hancock was elected as the first female Speaker of the Legislative Assembly. In 2017, Gladys Berejiklian became the first Liberal woman to be elected as Premier of New South Wales and first female Liberal premier of any Australian state.

While there had been a number of women elected to the Legislative Council throughout the middle of the twentieth century, it was only at the 1988 state election that numbers began to grow in the Legislative Assembly. Seven women had been elected in the previous 132 years; six more joined them the 1988 election. Numbers have improved substantially in recent years, with women now occupying 38 Assembly seats in the current parliament. Linda Burney is the only Indigenous Australian woman to have been elected to the New South Wales Parliament.

== List of women in the New South Wales Legislative Assembly ==
Names in bold indicate women who have been appointed as Ministers and Parliamentary Secretaries during their time in Parliament. Names in italics indicate entry into Parliament through a by-election and * symbolises members that have sat as members in both the Legislative Assembly and the Legislative Council.

#	Name	Party	Electoral district	Period of service
1	Millicent Preston-Stanley	Nationalist	Eastern Suburbs	30 May 1925 – 7 September 1927 (defeated)
2	Mary Quirk	Labor	Balmain	14 January 1939 – 22 May 1950 (defeated)
3	Lilian Fowler	Lang Labor	Newtown	27 May 1944 – 22 May 1950 (defeated)
4	Mary Meillon	Liberal	Murray	10 October 1973 – 9 June 1980 (died)
5	Rosemary Foot	Liberal	Vaucluse	7 October 1978 – 13 February 1986 (retired)
6	**Janice Crosio**	Labor	Fairfield	19 September 1981 – 16 February 1990 (resigned)
7	**Wendy Machin**	National	Gloucester; Manning; Port Macquarie	12 October 1985 – 28 August 1996 (resigned)
8	**Pam Allan**	Labor	Wentworthville; Blacktown	19 March 1988 – 24 March 2007 (retired)
8	**Anne Cohen**	Liberal	Minchinbury; Badgerys Creek	19 March 1988 – 25 March 1995 (defeated)
8	Dawn Fraser	Independent	Balmain	19 March 1988 – 25 May 1991 (defeated)
8	Clover Moore	Independent	Bligh; Sydney	19 March 1988 – 20 September 2012 (resigned)
8	**Sandra Nori**	Labor	McKell; Port Jackson	19 March 1988 – 24 March 2007 (retired)
13	Robyn Read	Independent	North Shore	5 November 1988 – 25 May 1991 (defeated)
14	**Deirdre Grusovin** *	Labor	Heffron	23 June 1990 – 22 March 2003 (retired)
15	**Kerry Chikarovski**	Liberal	Lane Cove	25 May 1991 – 22 March 2003 (retired)
15	Liz Kernohan	Liberal	Camden	25 May 1991 – 22 March 2003 (retired)
15	**Faye Lo Po'**	Labor	Penrith	25 May 1991 – 22 March 2003 (retired)
18	**Jillian Skinner**	Liberal	North Shore	5 February 1994 – 20 February 2017 (resigned)
19	**Gabrielle Harrison**	Labor	Parramatta	27 August 1994 – 22 March 2003 (retired)
20	**Reba Meagher**	Labor	Cabramatta	22 October 1994 – 17 September 2008 (resigned)
21	Marie Andrews	Labor	Peats; Gosford	25 March 1995 – 26 March 2011 (retired)
21	**Diane Beamer**	Labor	Badgerys Creek; Mulgoa	25 March 1995 – 26 March 2011 (retired)
21	Marie Ficarra*	Liberal	Georges River	25 March 1995 – 27 March 1999 (defeated)
21	Jill Hall	Labor	Swansea	25 March 1995 – 1 September 1998 (resigned)
25	Peta Seaton	Liberal	Southern Highlands	25 May 1996 – 24 March 2007 (retired)
26	Lorna Stone	Liberal	Sutherland	20 December 1997 – 27 March 1999 (defeated)
27	**Cherie Burton**	Labor	Kogarah	27 March 1999 – 28 March 2015 (retired)
27	**Katrina Hodgkinson**	National	Burrinjuck; Cootamundra	27 March 1999 – 1 September 2017 (resigned)
27	**Alison Megarrity**	Labor	Menai	27 March 1999 – 26 March 2011 (retired)
27	Marianne Saliba	Labor	Illawarra	27 March 1999 – 24 March 2007 (retired)
31	**Barbara Perry**	Labor	Auburn	8 September 2001 – 28 March 2015 (retired)
32	Judy Hopwood	Liberal	Hornsby	23 February 2002 – 26 March 2011 (retired)
33	**Gladys Berejiklian**	Liberal	Willoughby	22 March 2003 – 30 December 2021 (resigned)
33	**Linda Burney**	Labor	Canterbury	22 March 2003 – 6 May 2016 (resigned)
33	**Angela D'Amore**	Labor	Drummoyne	22 March 2003 – 26 March 2011 (retired)
33	Tanya Gadiel	Labor	Parramatta	22 March 2003 – 26 March 2011 (retired)
33	**Shelley Hancock**	Liberal	South Coast	22 March 2003 – 25 March 2023 (retired)
33	**Noreen Hay**	Labor	Wollongong	22 March 2003 – 31 August 2016 (resigned)
33	**Virginia Judge**	Labor	Strathfield	22 March 2003 – 26 March 2011 (defeated)
33	**Kristina Keneally**	Labor	Heffron	22 March 2003 – 29 June 2012 (resigned)
33	**Karyn Paluzzano**	Labor	Penrith	22 March 2003 – 7 May 2010 (resigned)
42	Dawn Fardell	Independent	Dubbo	20 November 2004 – 26 March 2011 (defeated)
43	**Carmel Tebbutt***	Labor	Marrickville	17 September 2005 – 28 March 2015 (retired)
44	**Verity Firth**	Labor	Balmain	24 March 2007 – 26 March 2011 (defeated)
44	**Pru Goward**	Liberal	Goulburn	24 March 2007 – 23 March 2019 (retired)
44	**Sonia Hornery**	Labor	Wallsend	24 March 2007 –
44	**Jodi McKay**	Labor	Newcastle; Strathfield	24 March 2007 – 26 March 2011 (defeated); 28 March 2015 – 31 December 2021 (resigned)
44	**Lylea McMahon**	Labor	Shellharbour	24 March 2007 – 26 March 2011 (retired)
49	**Tanya Davies**	Liberal	Mulgoa; Badgerys Creek	26 March 2011 –
49	**Melanie Gibbons**	Liberal	Menai; Holsworthy	26 March 2011 – 25 March 2023 (lost renomination)
49	Tania Mihailuk	Labor	Bankstown	26 March 2011 – 25 March 2023 (resigned to run for LC)
49	**Robyn Parker** *	Liberal	Maitland	26 March 2011 – 28 March 2015 (retired)
49	Roza Sage	Liberal	Blue Mountains	26 March 2011 – 28 March 2015 (defeated)
49	**Gabrielle Upton**	Liberal	Vaucluse	26 March 2011 – 25 March 2023 (retired)
49	Anna Watson	Labor	Shellharbour	26 March 2011 –
49	**Leslie Williams**	National/Liberal	Port Macquarie	26 March 2011 – 31 January 2025 (resigned)
57	**Jodie Harrison**	Labor	Charlestown	26 October 2014 –
58	**Jenny Aitchison**	Labor	Maitland	28 March 2015 –
58	**Prue Car**	Labor	Londonderry	28 March 2015 –
58	**Yasmin Catley**	Labor	Swansea	28 March 2015 –
58	**Trish Doyle**	Labor	Blue Mountains	28 March 2015 –
58	**Julia Finn**	Labor	Granville	28 March 2015 –
58	**Jo Haylen**	Labor	Summer Hill	28 March 2015 –
58	Jenny Leong	Greens	Newtown	28 March 2015 –
58	**Eleni Petinos**	Liberal	Miranda	28 March 2015 –
58	**Melinda Pavey***	National	Oxley	28 March 2015 – 25 March 2023 (retired)
58	Kathy Smith	Labor	Gosford	28 March 2015 – 14 February 2017 (resigned)
58	Tamara Smith	Greens	Ballina	28 March 2015 –
58	**Kate Washington**	Labor	Port Stephens	28 March 2015 –
70	**Sophie Cotsis***	Labor	Canterbury	12 November 2016 –
71	**Liesl Tesch**	Labor	Gosford	8 April 2017 –
71	**Felicity Wilson**	Liberal	North Shore	8 April 2017 –
73	**Steph Cooke**	National	Cootamundra	14 October 2017 –
74	Helen Dalton	SFF/Independent	Murray	23 March 2019 –
74	Wendy Lindsay	Liberal	East Hills	23 March 2019 – 25 March 2023 (defeated)
74	**Marjorie O'Neill**	Labor	Coogee	23 March 2019 –
74	**Robyn Preston**	Liberal	Hawkesbury	23 March 2019 –
74	Janelle Saffin*	Labor	Lismore	23 March 2019 –
74	**Wendy Tuckerman**	Liberal	Goulburn	23 March 2019 –
74	Lynda Voltz*	Labor	Auburn	23 March 2019 –
81	Nichole Overall	National	Monaro	12 February 2022 – 25 March 2023 (defeated)
82	Tina Ayyad	Liberal	Holsworthy	25 March 2023 –
82	Liza Butler	Labor	South Coast	25 March 2023 –
82	Donna Davis	Labor	Parramatta	25 March 2023 –
82	Stephanie Di Pasqua	Liberal	Drummoyne	25 March 2023 –
82	Judy Hannan	Independent	Wollondilly	25 March 2023 –
82	Charishma Kaliyanda	Labor	Liverpool	25 March 2023 –
82	Karen McKeown	Labor	Penrith	25 March 2023 –
82	Sally Quinnell	Labor	Camden	25 March 2023 –
82	Kobi Shetty	Greens	Balmain	25 March 2023 –
82	Kellie Sloane	Liberal	Vaucluse	25 March 2023 –
82	Maryanne Stuart	Labor	Heathcote	25 March 2023 –
82	Tanya Thompson	National	Myall Lakes	25 March 2023 –
82	Kylie Wilkinson	Labor	East Hills	25 March 2023 –
95	Jacqui Scruby	Independent	Pittwater	19 October 2024 –
95	Monica Tudehope	Liberal	Epping	19 October 2024 –
97	Katelin McInerney	Labor	Kiama	13 September 2025 –

== Proportion of women in the Assembly ==
Numbers and proportions are as they were directly after the relevant election and do not take into account by-elections, defections or other changes in membership. The Liberal column also includes that party's predecessors, the Nationalist, United Australia and Democratic parties.

Term	Labor			Liberal			National			Others			Total		
Term	Women	Total	%	Women	Total	%	Women	Total	%	Women	Total	%	Women	Total	%
1925–1927	0	46	0.0%	1	32	3.1%	0	9	0.0%	0	3	0.0%	1	90	1.1%
1927–1930	0	40	0.0%	0	33	0.0%	0	13	0.0%	0	4	0.0%	0	90	0.0%
1930–1932	0	55	0.0%	0	23	0.0%	0	12	0.0%	0	0	0.0%	0	90	0.0%
1932–1935	0	24	0.0%	0	41	0.0%	0	25	0.0%	0	0	0.0%	0	90	0.0%
1935–1938	0	29	0.0%	0	38	0.0%	0	23	0.0%	0	0	0.0%	0	90	0.0%
1938–1941	0	28	0.0%	0	37	0.0%	0	22	0.0%	0	3	0.0%	0	90	0.0%
1941–1944	1	54	1.9%	0	14	0.0%	0	12	0.0%	0	10	0.0%	1	90	1.1%
1944–1947	1	56	1.8%	0	12	0.0%	0	10	0.0%	1	12	8.3%	2	90	2.2%
1947–1950	1	52	1.9%	0	19	0.0%	0	15	0.0%	1	4	25.0%	2	90	2.2%
1950–1953	0	46	0.0%	0	29	0.0%	0	17	0.0%	0	2	0.0%	0	94	0.0%
1953–1956	0	57	0.0%	0	22	0.0%	0	14	0.0%	0	1	0.0%	0	94	0.0%
1956–1959	0	50	0.0%	0	27	0.0%	0	15	0.0%	0	2	0.0%	0	94	0.0%
1959–1962	0	49	0.0%	0	28	0.0%	0	16	0.0%	0	1	0.0%	0	94	0.0%
1962–1965	0	54	0.0%	0	25	0.0%	0	14	0.0%	0	1	0.0%	0	94	0.0%
1965–1968	0	45	0.0%	0	31	0.0%	0	16	0.0%	0	2	0.0%	0	94	0.0%
1968–1971	0	39	0.0%	0	36	0.0%	0	17	0.0%	0	2	0.0%	0	94	0.0%
1971–1973	0	45	0.0%	0	32	0.0%	0	17	0.0%	0	2	0.0%	0	96	0.0%
1973–1976	0	44	0.0%	1	34	2.9%	0	18	0.0%	0	3	0.0%	1	99	1.0%
1976–1978	0	50	0.0%	1	30	3.3%	0	18	0.0%	0	1	0.0%	1	99	1.0%
1978–1981	0	63	0.0%	2	18	11.1%	0	17	0.0%	0	1	0.0%	2	99	2.0%
1981–1984	1	69	1.4%	1	14	7.1%	0	14	0.0%	0	2	0.0%	2	99	2.0%
1984–1988	1	58	1.7%	1	22	4.5%	0	15	0.0%	0	4	0.0%	2	99	2.0%
1988–1991	3	43	7.0%	1	39	2.6%	1	20	5.0%	2	7	28.6%	7	109	6.4%
1991–1995	4	46	8.7%	3	32	9.4%	1	17	5.9%	1	4	25.0%	9	99	9.1%
1995–1999	9	50	18.0%	4	29	13.8%	1	17	5.9%	1	3	33.3%	15	99	15.2%
1999–2003	11	55	22.0%	4	20	20.0%	1	13	7.7%	1	5	20.0%	17	93	18.3%
2003–2007	16	55	29.1%	5	20	25.0%	1	12	8.3%	1	6	16.7%	23	93	24.7%
2007–2011	18	52	34.6%	5	22	22.7%	1	13	7.7%	2	6	33.3%	26	93	28.0%
2011–2015	9	20	45.0%	9	51	17.6%	2	18	11.1%	1	4	25.0%	21	93	22.6%
2015–2019	15	34	44.1%	7	37	18.9%	3	17	17.6%	2	5	40.0%	27	93	29.0%
2019–2023	17	36	47.2%	10	35	28.6%	3	13	23.1%	3	9	33.3%	33	93	35.5%
2023–2027	22	45	48.9%	9	24	37.5%	2	11	18.1%	5	12	41.7%	38	92	41.3%
