= Results of the 2023 New South Wales Legislative Assembly election =

State election for New South Wales, Australia in March 2023

New South Wales state election, 25 March 2023 Legislative Assembly << 2019–2027 >>
Enrolled voters	5,521,688				
Votes cast	4,861,148		Turnout	88.04	−1.39
Informal votes	159,218		Informal	3.28	−0.18
Summary of votes by party
Party	Primary votes	%	Swing	Seats	Change
Labor	1,738,081	36.97	+3.66	45	+9
Liberal	1,259,253	26.78	–5.21	25	−10
Greens	455,960	9.70	+0.13	3	±0
National	403,962	8.59	–1.00	11	−2
Sustainable Australia	104,697	2.23	+0.69	0	±0
One Nation	84,683	1.80	+0.70	0	±0
Shooters, Fishers, Farmers	73,359	1.56	–1.90	0	−3
Legalise Cannabis	60,057	1.28	+1.28	0	±0
Animal Justice	51,548	1.10	–0.42	0	±0
Liberal Democrats	39,480	0.84	+0.61	0	±0
Informed Medical Options	11,529	0.25	+0.25	0	±0
Public Education	4,150	0.09	+0.09	0	±0
Small Business	2,025	0.04	−0.03	0	±0
Socialist Alliance	1,464	0.03	+0.00	0	±0
Independent	411,682	8.76	+3.98	9	+6
Total	4,701,930			93	
Two-party-preferred
Labor	2,202,922	54.27	+6.29		
Coalition	1,856,227	45.73	−6.29		

This is a list of electoral district results for the 2023 New South Wales state election.

== Results by electoral district ==
=== Albury ===
2023 New South Wales state election: Albury
Party	Candidate	Votes	%	±%
Liberal	Justin Clancy	26,368	53.0	−3.7
Labor	Marcus Rowland	11,081	22.3	−2.6
Greens	Eli Davern	4,672	9.4	+0.0
Shooters, Fishers, Farmers	Peter Sinclair	4,009	8.1	+8.1
Animal Justice	Asanki Fernando	1,263	2.5	+2.5
Liberal Democrats	Geoffrey Robertson	1,224	2.5	+2.5
Sustainable Australia	Ross Hamilton	1,171	2.4	−4.6
Total formal votes		49,788	96.5	+1.3
Informal votes		1,795	3.5	−1.3
Turnout		51,583	86.2	−0.1
Two-party-preferred result
Liberal	Justin Clancy	28,811	66.3	+0.5
Labor	Marcus Rowland	14,626	33.7	−0.5
Liberal hold		Swing	+0.5	

=== Auburn ===
2023 New South Wales state election: Auburn
Party	Candidate	Votes	%	±%
Labor	Lynda Voltz	28,167	60.1	+6.0
Liberal	Haseen Zaman	9,327	19.9	−11.3
Greens	Masoomeh Asgari	3,237	6.9	+0.0
Liberal Democrats	Julie Morkos Douaihy	3,162	6.7	+6.7
	Jamal Daoud	1,733	3.7	+3.7
Sustainable Australia	Shelley Goed	1,227	2.6	+2.6
Total formal votes		46,853	93.4	−0.4
Informal votes		3,286	6.6	+0.4
Turnout		50,139	84.8	+0.5
Two-party-preferred result
Labor	Lynda Voltz	30,701	74.0	+10.3
Liberal	Haseen Zaman	10,793	26.0	−10.3
Labor hold		Swing	+10.3	

=== Badgerys Creek ===
2023 New South Wales state election: Badgerys Creek
Party	Candidate	Votes	%	±%
Liberal	Tanya Davies	26,972	51.8	−2.3
Labor	Garion Thain	16,766	32.2	−2.2
One Nation	Benjamin Green	4,268	8.2	+5.8
Greens	Nick Best	2,751	5.3	+0.4
Sustainable Australia	Peter Cooper	1,321	2.5	−0.6
Total formal votes		52,078	96.2	+0.2
Informal votes		2,072	3.8	−0.2
Turnout		54,150	89.9	+1.3
Two-party-preferred result
Liberal	Tanya Davies	28,868	60.5	+0.7
Labor	Garion Thain	18,866	39.5	−0.7
Liberal hold		Swing	+0.7	

=== Ballina ===
2023 New South Wales state election: Ballina
Party	Candidate	Votes	%	±%
Greens	Tamara Smith	16,792	35.2	+4.0
National	Josh Booyens	14,535	30.4	−7.0
Labor	Andrew Broadley	10,880	22.8	−2.2
Independent	Kevin Loughrey	3,710	7.8	+7.8
Sustainable Australia	Peter Jenkins	1,822	3.8	+1.6
Total formal votes		47,739	97.0	−0.3
Informal votes		1,455	3.0	+0.3
Turnout		49,194	83.4	−3.7
Notional two-party-preferred count
Labor	Andrew Broadley	22,445	56.2	+2.3
National	Josh Booyens	17,492	43.8	−2.3
Two-candidate-preferred result
Greens	Tamara Smith	23,897	57.7	+2.9
National	Josh Booyens	17,506	42.3	−2.9
Greens hold		Swing	+2.9	

=== Balmain ===
2023 New South Wales state election: Balmain
Party	Candidate	Votes	%	±%
Greens	Kobi Shetty	20,240	40.48	−2.25
Labor	Philippa Scott	18,555	37.11	+8.25
Liberal	Freya Leach	9,566	19.13	−0.90
Sustainable Australia	Stephen Bisgrove	1,189	2.38	+0.84
Public Education	Glen Stelzer	447	0.89	+0.89
Total formal votes		49,997	98.39	−0.05
Informal votes		820	1.61	+0.05
Turnout		50,817	86.45	−0.28
Notional two-party-preferred count
Labor	Philippa Scott	32,752	74.50	+4.05
Liberal	Freya Leach	11,208	25.50	−4.05
Two-candidate-preferred result
Greens	Kobi Shetty	22,118	51.80	−8.22
Labor	Philippa Scott	20,580	48.20	+8.22
Greens hold		Swing	−8.22	

=== Bankstown ===
2023 New South Wales state election: Bankstown
Party	Candidate	Votes	%	±%
Labor	Jihad Dib	27,247	59.4	−0.8
Liberal	Nathan Taleb	11,379	24.8	+0.8
Greens	Isaac Nasedra	2,436	5.3	+0.8
Informed Medical Options	Yosra Alyateem	1,306	2.8	+2.8
Independent	Max Boddy	1,223	2.7	+2.7
Animal Justice	Dorlene Abou-Haidar	893	1.9	+0.7
Sustainable Australia	Luke Habib	725	1.6	+1.6
Public Education	Marianne Glinka	679	1.5	+1.5
Total formal votes		45,888	93.4	−0.4
Informal votes		3,267	6.6	+0.4
Turnout		49,155	82.9	−2.5
Two-party-preferred result
Labor	Jihad Dib	29,210	70.3	−0.1
Liberal	Nathan Taleb	12,322	29.7	+0.1
Labor hold		Swing	−0.1	

=== Barwon ===
2023 New South Wales state election: Barwon
Party	Candidate	Votes	%	±%
Independent	Roy Butler	19,630	44.78	+44.78
National	Annette Turner	11,158	25.45	−4.93
Labor	Joshua Roberts-Garnsey	6,816	15.55	−5.37
Shooters, Fishers, Farmers	Paul Britton	2,983	6.80	−26.16
Legalise Cannabis	Ben Hartley	1,591	3.63	+3.63
Greens	Pat Schultz	881	2.01	−1.01
Independent	Stuart Howe	460	1.05	+1.05
Public Education	Thomas McBride	318	0.73	+0.73
Total formal votes		43,837	96.94	+0.49
Informal votes		1,384	3.06	−0.49
Turnout		45,221	84.16	−2.64
Notional two-party-preferred count
National	Annette Turner	15,971	60.76	+8.24
Labor	Joshua Roberts-Garnsey	10,316	39.24	−8.24
Two-candidate-preferred result
Independent	Roy Butler	23,868	65.99	+65.99
National	Annette Turner	12,299	34.01	−9.39
Member changed to Independent from Shooters, Fishers, Farmers				

=== Bathurst ===
2023 New South Wales state election: Bathurst
Party	Candidate	Votes	%	±%
National	Paul Toole	29,873	57.0	+1.9
Labor	Cameron Shaw	8,442	16.1	−4.4
Shooters, Fishers, Farmers	Craig Sinclair	3,850	7.3	−7.4
Greens	Kay Nankervis	3,595	6.9	+1.3
Independent	Martin Ticehurst	3,449	6.6	+6.6
Legalise Cannabis	Antony Zbik	1,472	2.8	+2.8
Liberal Democrats	Burchell Wilson	1,092	2.1	+2.1
Sustainable Australia	Michael Begg	626	1.2	−1.4
Total formal votes		52,399	97.4	+0.4
Informal votes		1,400	2.6	−0.4
Turnout		53,799	90.5	−1.1
Two-party-preferred result
National	Paul Toole	32,850	73.6	+5.7
Labor	Cameron Shaw	11,801	26.4	−5.7
National hold		Swing	+5.7	

=== Bega ===
2023 New South Wales state election: Bega
Party	Candidate	Votes	%	±%
Labor	Michael Holland	23,294	45.07	+14.48
Liberal	Russell Fitzpatrick	16,268	31.48	−17.43
Greens	Cathy Griff	4,322	8.36	−1.39
Shooters, Fishers, Farmers	Debra Abbott	3,802	7.36	+0.90
Legalise Cannabis	Greg White	2,043	3.95	+3.95
Independent	Jeffrey Hawkins	1,199	2.32	+2.32
Sustainable Australia	Karin Geiselhart	756	1.46	+1.46
Total formal votes		51,684	97.19	+0.01
Informal votes		1,495	2.81	−0.01
Turnout		53,179	88.99	−0.76
Two-party-preferred result
Labor	Michael Holland	27,835	60.40	+17.33
Liberal	Russell Fitzpatrick	18,248	39.60	−17.33
Labor gain from Liberal		Swing	+17.33	

Andrew Constance (Liberal) had won the seat at the 2019 state election, however he resigned in 2021 and Michael Holland (Labor) won the seat at the resulting by-election. At the 2023 state election, Holland retained the seat he won at the by-election.

=== Blacktown ===
2023 New South Wales state election: Blacktown
Party	Candidate	Votes	%	±%
Labor	Stephen Bali	27,128	55.6	+0.9
Liberal	Allan Green	11,637	23.9	−2.6
Legalise Cannabis	Peter Foster	2,524	5.2	+5.2
Greens	Leonard Hobbs	2,521	5.2	−1.1
Animal Justice	Emma Kerin	2,357	4.8	+4.7
Liberal Democrats	Alexander Mishalow	1,559	3.2	+3.2
Sustainable Australia	Patrick Murphy	1,022	2.1	+2.1
Total formal votes		48,748	95.8	−0.1
Informal votes		2,123	4.2	+0.1
Turnout		50,871	86.8	−2.7
Two-party-preferred result
Labor	Stephen Bali	30,091	69.1	+2.5
Liberal	Allan Green	13,442	30.9	−2.5
Labor hold		Swing	+2.5	

=== Blue Mountains ===
2023 New South Wales state election: Blue Mountains
Party	Candidate	Votes	%	±%
Labor	Trish Doyle	28,613	53.9	+8.2
Liberal	Sophie-Anne Bruce	12,640	23.8	−5.7
Greens	Jenna Condie	6,669	12.6	+0.5
Animal Justice	Greg Keightley	2,285	4.3	+0.4
Informed Medical Options	Michelle Palmer	1,901	3.6	+3.6
Sustainable Australia	Richard Marschall	948	1.8	−1.1
Total formal votes		53,056	97.9	+0.3
Informal votes		1,143	2.1	−0.3
Turnout		54,199	91.7	−1.2
Two-party-preferred result
Labor	Trish Doyle	35,536	71.9	+8.3
Liberal	Sophie-Anne Bruce	13,893	28.1	−8.3
Labor hold		Swing	+8.3	

=== Cabramatta ===
2023 New South Wales state election: Cabramatta
Party	Candidate	Votes	%	±%
Labor	Tri Vo	21,213	41.3	−7.2
Liberal	Courtney Nguyen	11,604	22.6	+1.6
Independent	Kate Hoang	8,522	16.6	+16.6
Liberal Democrats	Mark Smaling	5,046	9.8	+9.8
Greens	Roz Chia Davis	2,645	5.2	−0.1
Animal Justice	Randa Moussa	2,299	4.5	+3.9
Total formal votes		51,329	94.5	−1.1
Informal votes		3,005	5.5	+1.1
Turnout		54,334	88.4	−3.0
Two-party-preferred result
Labor	Tri Vo	24,460	61.8	−7.5
Liberal	Courtney Nguyen	15,117	38.2	+7.5
Labor hold		Swing	−7.5	

=== Camden ===
2023 New South Wales state election: Camden
Party	Candidate	Votes	%	±%
Labor	Sally Quinnell	21,945	40.6	+11.2
Liberal	Peter Sidgreaves	19,686	36.4	−5.7
One Nation	Garry Dollin	7,437	13.8	+0.4
Greens	Emily Rivera	3,136	5.8	+1.7
Sustainable Australia	Jessie Bijok	1,868	3.5	+2.2
Total formal votes		54,072	96.3	0.0
Informal votes		2,056	3.7	+0.0
Turnout		56,128	90.7	+3.8
Two-party-preferred result
Labor	Sally Quinnell	25,060	53.0	+10.3
Liberal	Peter Sidgreaves	22,222	47.0	−10.3
Labor gain from Liberal		Swing	+10.3	

=== Campbelltown ===
2023 New South Wales state election: Campbelltown
Party	Candidate	Votes	%	±%
Labor	Greg Warren	25,629	53.7	+1.9
Liberal	Gypshouna Paudel	8,104	17.0	−9.8
One Nation	Adam Zahra	5,498	11.5	+11.5
Greens	Jayden Rivera	2,876	6.0	+0.9
Liberal Democrats	Rosa Sicari	2,339	4.9	+4.9
Animal Justice	Matt Twaddell	1,866	3.9	+0.1
Sustainable Australia	Howard Jones	867	1.8	−0.4
Independent	Tofick Galiell	549	1.2	+1.2
Total formal votes		47,728	95.3	+0.4
Informal votes		2,358	4.7	−0.4
Turnout		50,086	86.2	−1.8
Two-party-preferred result
Labor	Greg Warren	28,764	73.3	+7.3
Liberal	Gypshouna Paudel	10,481	26.7	−7.3
Labor hold		Swing	+7.3	

=== Canterbury ===
2023 New South Wales state election: Canterbury
Party	Candidate	Votes	%	±%
Labor	Sophie Cotsis	28,892	59.8	+6.2
Liberal	Nemr Boumansour	8,341	17.3	−12.5
Greens	Bradley Schott	4,354	9.0	−2.2
Liberal Democrats	Vanessa Hadchiti	3,941	8.2	+8.2
Sustainable Australia	Joe Sinacori	1,379	2.9	+2.9
Animal Justice	Kacey King	1,376	2.8	+2.6
Total formal votes		48,283	95.3	−0.1
Informal votes		2,386	4.7	+0.1
Turnout		50,669	86.5	−0.2
Two-party-preferred result
Labor	Sophie Cotsis	32,829	75.8	+10.5
Liberal	Nemr Boumansour	10,494	24.2	−10.5
Labor hold		Swing	+10.5	

=== Castle Hill ===
2023 New South Wales state election: Castle Hill
Party	Candidate	Votes	%	±%
Liberal	Mark Hodges	27,085	50.7	−13.4
Labor	Tina Cartwright	15,159	28.4	+8.3
Greens	Tina Kordrostami	4,786	9.0	+0.5
Liberal Democrats	My Trinh	3,642	6.8	+6.8
Sustainable Australia	Eric Claus	1,403	2.6	−0.5
Independent	Nathan Organ	1,352	2.5	+2.5
Total formal votes		53,427	97.6	+0.1
Informal votes		1,300	2.4	−0.1
Turnout		54,727	90.6	−1.5
Two-party-preferred result
Liberal	Mark Hodges	29,223	60.9	−11.5
Labor	Tina Cartwright	18,760	39.1	+11.5
Liberal hold		Swing	−11.5	

=== Cessnock ===
2023 New South Wales state election: Cessnock
Party	Candidate	Votes	%	±%
Labor	Clayton Barr	25,719	48.7	−6.1
One Nation	Quintin King	8,059	15.3	+15.3
Legalise Cannabis	Andrew Fenwick	6,294	11.9	+11.9
National	Ash Barnham (disendorsed)	5,877	11.1	−12.8
Greens	Llynda Nairn	3,476	6.6	−1.5
Animal Justice	Victoria Davies	2,141	4.1	−3.9
Sustainable Australia	Graham Jones	1,215	2.3	−2.9
Total formal votes		52,781	95.9	+1.0
Informal votes		2,231	4.1	−1.0
Turnout		55,012	88.6	+0.5
Notional two-party-preferred count
Labor	Clayton Barr	30,154	76.8	+7.1
National	Ash Barnham (disendorsed)	9,103	23.2	−7.1
Two-candidate-preferred result
Labor	Clayton Barr	29,964	73.4	+3.7
One Nation	Quintin King	10,865	26.6	+26.6
Labor hold				

=== Charlestown ===
2023 New South Wales state election: Charlestown
Party	Candidate	Votes	%	±%
Labor	Jodie Harrison	30,432	57.4	+7.7
Liberal	Jack Antcliff	13,178	24.9	−6.7
Greens	Greg Watkinson	6,778	12.8	+1.6
Sustainable Australia	Marie Rolfe	2,593	4.9	+4.9
Total formal votes		52,981	97.0	+0.6
Informal votes		1,632	3.0	−0.6
Turnout		54,613	89.6	−2.4
Two-party-preferred result
Labor	Jodie Harrison	35,300	71.1	+8.0
Liberal	Jack Antcliff	14,358	28.9	−8.0
Labor hold		Swing	+8.0	

=== Clarence ===
2023 New South Wales state election: Clarence
Party	Candidate	Votes	%	±%
National	Richie Williamson	24,247	49.6	+3.0
Labor	Leon Ankersmit	10,700	21.9	+0.9
Greens	Greg Clancy	3,739	7.6	−0.3
Legalise Cannabis	Mark Rayner	3,708	7.6	+7.6
Independent	Debrah Novak	3,433	7.0	+7.0
Independent	Nicki Levi	1,320	2.7	+2.7
Sustainable Australia	George Keller	1,061	2.2	+0.6
Independent Indigenous	Brett Duroux	725	1.5	+1.5
Total formal votes		48,933	96.2	−0.5
Informal votes		1,911	3.8	+0.5
Turnout		50,844	88.8	−0.7
Two-party-preferred result
National	Richie Williamson	26,475	64.3	−0.2
Labor	Leon Ankersmit	14,731	35.7	+0.2
National hold		Swing	−0.2	

=== Coffs Harbour ===
2023 New South Wales state election: Coffs Harbour
Party	Candidate	Votes	%	±%
National	Gurmesh Singh	25,319	51.43	+8.61
Labor	Tony Judge	10,263	20.85	+3.16
Independent	Sally Townley	5,978	12.14	−5.25
Legalise Cannabis	Tihema Elliston	2,917	5.93	+5.93
Greens	Tim Nott	2,814	5.72	−0.81
Animal Justice	Kellie Pearce	1,096	2.23	−0.47
Sustainable Australia	Ruth Cully	842	1.71	+1.71
Total formal votes		49,229	97.20	+0.95
Informal votes		1,416	2.80	−0.95
Turnout		50,645	87.58	−1.29
Two-party-preferred result
National	Gurmesh Singh	27,458	63.24	+2.47
Labor	Tony Judge	15,958	36.76	−2.47
National hold		Swing	+2.47	

=== Coogee ===
2023 New South Wales state election: Coogee
Party	Candidate	Votes	%	±%
Labor	Marjorie O'Neill	22,153	45.2	+10.7
Liberal	Kylie von Muenster	16,121	32.9	−7.5
Greens	Rafaela Pandolfini	7,927	16.2	+1.2
Sustainable Australia	Lluisa Murray	1,058	2.2	+0.8
Informed Medical Options	Alicia Mosquera	924	1.9	+1.9
Animal Justice	Simon Garrod	821	1.7	−0.2
Total formal votes		49,004	98.1	+0.1
Informal votes		930	1.9	−0.1
Turnout		49,934	83.9	−1.4
Two-party-preferred result
Labor	Marjorie O'Neill	28,440	62.3	+10.0
Liberal	Kylie von Muenster	17,221	37.7	−10.0
Labor hold		Swing	+10.0	

=== Cootamundra ===
2023 New South Wales state election: Cootamundra
Party	Candidate	Votes	%	±%
National	Steph Cooke	34,470	70.6	+9.4
Labor	Chris Dahlitz	6,566	13.4	−2.3
Shooters, Fishers, Farmers	Jake Cullen	4,209	8.6	−7.0
Greens	Jeffrey Passlow	1,198	2.5	−0.4
Independent	Robert Young	1,113	2.3	+2.3
Independent	Brian Fisher	674	1.4	+1.4
Sustainable Australia	Chris O'Rourke	618	1.3	−0.1
Total formal votes		48,848	97.7	+0.4
Informal votes		1,143	2.3	−0.4
Turnout		49,991	89.2	−2.9
Two-party-preferred result
National	Steph Cooke	36,446	82.1	+5.5
Labor	Chris Dahlitz	7,959	17.9	−5.5
National hold		Swing	+5.5	

=== Cronulla ===
2023 New South Wales state election: Cronulla
Party	Candidate	Votes	%	±%
Liberal	Mark Speakman	28,505	54.18	−9.34
Labor	Paul Constance	14,468	27.50	+4.30
Greens	Catherine Dyson	4,585	8.71	+1.30
One Nation	Craig Ibbotson	3,197	6.08	+6.08
Sustainable Australia	Richard Moran	1,012	1.92	−0.55
Informed Medical Options	Domna Giannakis	845	1.61	+1.61
Total formal votes		52,612	97.68	+0.20
Informal votes		1,251	2.32	−0.20
Turnout		53,863	91.41	−0.19
Two-party-preferred result
Liberal	Mark Speakman	30,407	63.79	−5.82
Labor	Paul Constance	17,263	36.21	+5.82
Liberal hold		Swing	−5.82	

=== Davidson ===
2023 New South Wales state election: Davidson
Party	Candidate	Votes	%	±%
Liberal	Matt Cross	28,865	54.1	−10.3
Labor	Karyn Edelstein	10,917	20.5	+6.3
Independent	Janine Kitson	6,080	11.4	+11.4
Greens	Caroline Atkinson	6,060	11.4	−2.1
Sustainable Australia	Andrew Wills	1,397	2.6	−1.1
Total formal votes		53,319	97.8	−0.1
Informal votes		1,196	2.2	+0.1
Turnout		54,515	91.1	0.0
Two-party-preferred result
Liberal	Matt Cross	30,821	63.9	−10.9
Labor	Karyn Edelstein	17,393	36.1	+10.9
Liberal hold		Swing	−10.9	

=== Drummoyne ===
2023 New South Wales state election: Drummoyne
Party	Candidate	Votes	%	±%
Liberal	Stephanie Di Pasqua	24,526	47.5	−10.0
Labor	Julia Little	20,182	39.1	+12.5
Greens	Charles Jago	5,149	10.0	+0.6
Sustainable Australia	Patrick Conaghan	1,782	3.5	+3.5
Total formal votes		51,639	97.8	+0.1
Informal votes		1,177	2.2	−0.1
Turnout		52,816	89.6	−0.2
Two-party-preferred result
Liberal	Stephanie Di Pasqua	25,308	51.3	−12.3
Labor	Julia Little	24,023	48.7	+12.3
Liberal hold		Swing	−12.3	

The incumbent member, John Sidoti, was expelled from the Liberal Party and sat as an independent, before being suspended from Parliament. Sidoti did not contest the seat and the Liberal candidate (Stephanie Di Pasqua) subsequently retained the seat for the Liberal Party.

=== Dubbo ===
2023 New South Wales state election: Dubbo
Party	Candidate	Votes	%	±%
National	Dugald Saunders	26,907	54.3	+16.9
Labor	Josh Black	10,859	21.9	+7.1
Shooters, Fishers, Farmers	Kate Richardson	7,035	14.2	+0.5
Legalise Cannabis	Mark Littlejohn	2,197	4.4	+4.4
Greens	Robyn Thomas	1,761	3.6	−0.1
Sustainable Australia	Anthony Nugent	785	1.6	+1.6
Total formal votes		49,544	96.9	+0.7
Informal votes		1,595	3.1	−0.7
Turnout		51,139	88.3	−1.2
Two-party-preferred result
National	Dugald Saunders	29,479	68.6	+0.5
Labor	Josh Black	13,515	31.4	−0.5
National hold		Swing	+0.5	

=== East Hills ===
2023 New South Wales state election: East Hills
Party	Candidate	Votes	%	±%
Labor	Kylie Wilkinson	22,140	43.9	+3.2
Liberal	Wendy Lindsay	21,996	43.6	+2.1
Greens	Natalie Hanna	3,578	7.1	+2.2
Independent	Chris Brogan	2,679	5.3	+5.3
Total formal votes		50,393	95.2	−0.1
Informal votes		2,544	4.8	+0.1
Turnout		52,937	88.7	−0.2
Two-party-preferred result
Labor	Kylie Wilkinson	24,677	51.7	+1.8
Liberal	Wendy Lindsay	23,013	48.3	−1.8
Labor gain from Liberal		Swing	+1.8	

=== Epping ===
2023 New South Wales state election: Epping
Party	Candidate	Votes	%	±%
Liberal	Dominic Perrottet	25,439	48.9	−5.4
Labor	Alan Mascarenhas	17,599	33.9	+5.4
Greens	Phil Bradley	5,489	10.6	+0.7
Independent	Victor Waterson	1,322	2.5	+2.5
Animal Justice	Carmen Terceiro	1,091	2.1	+2.1
Sustainable Australia	Bradley Molloy	1,045	2.0	+2.0
Total formal votes		51,985	97.6	+0.2
Informal votes		1,279	2.4	−0.2
Turnout		53,264	90.7	−1.3
Two-party-preferred result
Liberal	Dominic Perrottet	26,648	54.8	−6.5
Labor	Alan Mascarenhas	22,013	45.2	+6.5
Liberal hold		Swing	−6.5	

=== Fairfield ===
2023 New South Wales state election: Fairfield
Party	Candidate	Votes	%	±%
Labor	David Saliba	24,340	51.1	−5.8
Liberal	Aaryen Pillai	9,675	20.3	−6.6
Independent	Hikmat Odesh	4,891	10.3	+10.3
Independent	Severino Lovero	3,219	6.8	+6.8
Greens	Monika Ball	2,615	5.5	−1.7
Legalise Cannabis	Jacob Potkonyak	1,841	3.9	+3.9
Public Education	Robyn Leggatt	1,017	2.1	+2.1
Total formal votes		47,598	92.9	−1.2
Informal votes		3,625	7.1	+1.2
Turnout		51,223	85.2	−2.5
Two-party-preferred result
Labor	David Saliba	27,792	70.9	+4.0
Liberal	Aaryen Pillai	11,414	29.1	−4.0
Labor hold		Swing	+4.0	

=== Gosford ===
2023 New South Wales state election: Gosford
Party	Candidate	Votes	%	±%
Labor	Liesl Tesch	24,703	50.4	+6.3
Liberal	Dee Bocking	13,881	28.3	−7.8
Greens	Hilary van Haren	4,553	9.3	+0.2
Shooters, Fishers, Farmers	Larry Freeman	2,071	4.2	−0.5
Independent	Lisa Bellamy	1,668	3.4	+3.4
Animal Justice	Emily McCallum	1,336	2.7	−0.7
Sustainable Australia	Ineka Soetens	806	1.6	−0.8
Total formal votes		49,018	97.0	+0.5
Informal votes		1,524	3.0	−0.5
Turnout		50,542	86.9	−2.0
Two-party-preferred result
Labor	Liesl Tesch	29,023	65.4	+8.3
Liberal	Dee Bocking	15,364	34.6	−8.3
Labor hold		Swing	+8.3	

=== Goulburn ===
2023 New South Wales state election: Goulburn
Party	Candidate	Votes	%	±%
Liberal	Wendy Tuckerman	20,737	40.8	+2.1
Labor	Michael Pilbrow	18,028	35.5	+5.2
Shooters, Fishers, Farmers	Andrew Wood	6,891	13.6	+4.3
Greens	John Olsen	3,587	7.1	−1.2
Sustainable Australia	Margaret Logan	1,532	3.0	+3.0
Total formal votes		50,775	97.0	+0.1
Informal votes		1,553	3.0	−0.1
Turnout		52,328	90.8	+0.5
Two-party-preferred result
Liberal	Wendy Tuckerman	23,185	51.3	−1.8
Labor	Michael Pilbrow	22,015	48.7	+1.8
Liberal hold		Swing	−1.8	

=== Granville ===
2023 New South Wales state election: Granville
Party	Candidate	Votes	%	±%
Labor	Julia Finn	27,163	55.8	+4.3
Liberal	Anm Masum	9,766	20.1	−15.4
Independent	Charbel Saad	3,907	8.0	+8.0
Liberal Democrats	John Hadchiti	3,792	7.8	+7.8
Greens	Janet Castle	2,755	5.7	+1.5
Animal Justice	Rohan Laxmanalal	1,304	2.7	+1.6
Total formal votes		48,687	94.1	−0.5
Informal votes		3,074	5.9	+0.5
Turnout		51,761	83.2	−3.4
Two-party-preferred result
Labor	Julia Finn	30,413	71.5	+12.1
Liberal	Anm Masum	12,123	28.5	−12.1
Labor hold		Swing	+12.1	

=== Hawkesbury ===
2023 New South Wales state election: Hawkesbury
Party	Candidate	Votes	%	±%
Liberal	Robyn Preston	23,283	43.8	−6.8
Labor	Amanda Kotlash	13,532	25.4	+5.7
One Nation	Susane Popovski	5,476	10.3	+10.3
Greens	Danielle Wheeler	3,977	7.5	+1.2
Independent	Angela Maguire	2,275	4.3	+4.3
Small Business	Eddie Dogramaci	2,025	3.8	+3.8
Independent	Tony Pettitt	1,486	2.8	+2.8
Sustainable Australia	Elissa Carrey	1,125	2.1	−0.4
Total formal votes		53,179	95.7	−0.4
Informal votes		2,368	4.3	+0.4
Turnout		55,547	90.8	+1.7
Two-party-preferred result
Liberal	Robyn Preston	26,004	59.8	−6.7
Labor	Amanda Kotlash	17,460	40.2	+6.7
Liberal hold		Swing	−6.7	

=== Heathcote ===
2023 New South Wales state election: Heathcote
Party	Candidate	Votes	%	±%
Labor	Maryanne Stuart	23,301	44.2	+6.2
Liberal	Lee Evans	18,122	34.4	−8.0
Greens	Cooper Riach	6,571	12.5	−0.2
Shooters, Fishers, Farmers	Sean Ambrose (disendorsed)	1,926	3.7	+0.6
Animal Justice	Arielle Perkett	1,434	2.7	−0.2
Sustainable Australia	Matthew Bragg	1,369	2.6	+1.8
Total formal votes		52,723	97.6	+0.2
Informal votes		1,317	2.4	−0.2
Turnout		54,040	92.5	−0.1
Two-party-preferred result
Labor	Maryanne Stuart	29,050	59.9	+8.3
Liberal	Lee Evans	19,408	40.1	−8.3
Labor notional hold		Swing	+8.3	

=== Heffron ===
2023 New South Wales state election: Heffron
Party	Candidate	Votes	%	±%
Labor	Ron Hoenig	22,458	49.7	+7.4
Liberal	Francis Devine	9,597	21.2	−6.5
Greens	Philipa Veitch	8,559	18.9	+1.1
Independent	Sarina Kilham	1,538	3.4	+3.4
Animal Justice	Linda Paull	1,252	2.8	−0.5
Sustainable Australia	Ann Godfrey	889	2.0	+2.0
Socialist Alliance	Rachel Evans	878	1.9	+1.9
Total formal votes		45,171	97.1	−0.2
Informal votes		1,328	2.9	+0.2
Turnout		46,499	82.6	−0.7
Two-party-preferred result
Labor	Ron Hoenig	29,757	73.3	+8.0
Liberal	Francis Devine	10,847	26.7	−8.0
Labor hold		Swing	+8.0	

=== Holsworthy ===
2023 New South Wales state election: Holsworthy
Party	Candidate	Votes	%	±%
Liberal	Tina Ayyad	20,449	41.9	−5.2
Labor	Mick Maroney	19,284	39.5	+4.4
One Nation	James Ingarfill	4,165	8.5	+1.5
Greens	Chris Kerle	2,719	5.6	+0.9
Independent	Deborah Swinbourn	2,174	4.5	+4.5
Total formal votes		48,791	95.7	0.0
Informal votes		2,182	4.3	+0.0
Turnout		50,973	87.8	−1.5
Two-party-preferred result
Liberal	Tina Ayyad	22,359	50.4	−5.6
Labor	Mick Maroney	22,028	49.6	+5.6
Liberal hold		Swing	−5.6	

=== Hornsby ===
2023 New South Wales state election: Hornsby
Party	Candidate	Votes	%	±%
Liberal	Matt Kean	23,451	43.3	−11.6
Labor	Melissa Hoile	13,418	24.8	+4.0
Greens	Tania Salitra	7,738	14.3	+3.3
One Nation	Steve Busch	4,298	7.9	+4.5
Liberal Democrats	Jeffrey Grimshaw	2,125	3.9	+3.9
Independent	Benjamin Caswell	1,557	2.9	+2.9
Sustainable Australia	Justin Thomas	918	1.7	+1.7
Independent	Adrian Dignam	661	1.2	+1.2
Total formal votes		54,166	97.6	+0.1
Informal votes		1,308	2.4	−0.1
Turnout		55,474	92.0	+0.2
Two-party-preferred result
Liberal	Matt Kean	26,506	58.0	−8.8
Labor	Melissa Hoile	19,163	42.0	+8.8
Liberal hold		Swing	−8.8	

=== Keira ===
2023 New South Wales state election: Keira
Party	Candidate	Votes	%	±%
Labor	Ryan Park	28,938	57.8	+4.3
Liberal	Noah Shipp	10,924	21.8	−5.7
Greens	Kit Docker	7,297	14.6	+1.7
Sustainable Australia	Andrew Anthony	2,867	5.7	+1.7
Total formal votes		50,026	96.9	+0.2
Informal votes		1,589	3.1	−0.2
Turnout		51,615	89.6	−2.0
Two-party-preferred result
Labor	Ryan Park	34,592	74.2	+5.9
Liberal	Noah Shipp	12,059	25.8	−5.9
Labor hold		Swing	+5.9	

=== Kellyville ===
2023 New South Wales state election: Kellyville
Party	Candidate	Votes	%	±%
Liberal	Ray Williams	29,450	55.4	−11.1
Labor	Alex Karki	16,571	31.2	+9.6
Greens	Thelma Ghayyem	4,235	8.0	+1.2
Sustainable Australia	Heather Boyd	1,569	2.9	−0.1
Animal Justice	Ingrid Akkari	1,368	2.6	+1.6
Total formal votes		53,193	97.7	+0.1
Informal votes		1,273	2.3	−0.1
Turnout		54,466	92.3	+4.3
Two-party-preferred result
Liberal	Ray Williams	30,682	61.0	−12.1
Labor	Alex Karki	19,653	39.0	+12.1
Liberal hold		Swing	−12.1	

=== Kiama ===
2023 New South Wales state election: Kiama
Party	Candidate	Votes	%	±%
Independent	Gareth Ward	20,316	38.79	+38.79
Labor	Katelin McInerney	18,010	34.39	+6.19
Liberal	Melanie Gibbons	6,301	12.03	−41.56
Greens	Tonia Gray	5,833	11.14	−0.74
Sustainable Australia	John Gill	1,911	3.65	+0.73
Total formal votes		52,371	96.90	+0.07
Informal votes		1,678	3.10	−0.07
Turnout		54,049	89.82	−1.28
Notional two-party-preferred count
Labor	Katelin McInerney	24,564	69.73	+31.74
Liberal	Melanie Gibbons	10,665	30.27	−31.74
Two-candidate-preferred result
Independent	Gareth Ward	23,018	50.76	+50.76
Labor	Katelin McInerney	22,329	49.24	+11.25
Member changed to Independent from Liberal				

=== Kogarah ===
2023 New South Wales state election: Kogarah
Party	Candidate	Votes	%	±%
Labor	Chris Minns	30,916	60.6	+19.7
Liberal	Craig Chung	14,380	28.2	−15.4
Greens	Tracy Yuen	3,511	6.9	+0.5
Independent	Troy Stolz	2,186	4.3	+4.3
Total formal votes		50,993	96.0	+0.3
Informal votes		2,145	4.0	−0.3
Turnout		53,138	89.2	+0.4
Two-party-preferred result
Labor	Chris Minns	33,393	68.3	+18.1
Liberal	Craig Chung	15,523	31.7	−18.1
Labor hold		Swing	+18.1	

=== Lake Macquarie ===
2023 New South Wales state election: Lake Macquarie
Party	Candidate	Votes	%	±%
Independent	Greg Piper	29,093	57.5	+3.0
Labor	Steve Ryan	10,031	19.8	−0.8
Liberal	Joshua Beer	5,091	10.1	−5.5
Shooters, Fishers, Farmers	Jason Lesage	3,203	6.3	+6.3
Greens	Kim Grierson	2,430	4.8	−0.1
Sustainable Australia	Felipe Gore-Escalante	761	1.5	0.0
Total formal votes		50,609	97.3	+0.8
Informal votes		1,386	2.7	−0.8
Turnout		51,995	88.1	−0.1
Notional two-party-preferred count
Labor	Steve Ryan	16,981	62.8	+6.3
Liberal	Joshua Beer	10,069	37.2	−6.3
Two-candidate-preferred result
Independent	Greg Piper	32,905	74.1	+0.9
Labor	Steve Ryan	11,492	25.9	−0.9
Independent hold		Swing	+0.9	

=== Lane Cove ===
2023 New South Wales state election: Lane Cove
Party	Candidate	Votes	%	±%
Liberal	Anthony Roberts	23,463	45.1	−7.2
Labor	Penelope Pedersen	12,469	24.0	+3.8
Independent	Victoria Davidson	10,608	20.4	+20.4
Greens	Heather Armstrong	4,331	8.3	−2.1
Sustainable Australia	Ben Wise	1,189	2.3	+0.3
Total formal votes		52,060	98.1	+0.1
Informal votes		1,026	1.9	−0.1
Turnout		53,086	90.6	+1.6
Two-party-preferred result
Liberal	Anthony Roberts	26,245	55.5	−9.2
Labor	Penelope Pedersen	21,047	44.5	+9.2
Liberal hold		Swing	−9.2	

=== Leppington ===
2023 New South Wales state election: Leppington
Party	Candidate	Votes	%	±%
Labor	Nathan Hagarty	25,499	50.3	+8.7
Liberal	Therese Fedeli	17,570	34.7	−5.4
One Nation	Mandar Tamhankar	3,807	7.5	+4.2
Greens	Apurva Shukla	2,536	5.0	+0.6
Sustainable Australia	Danica Sajn	1,254	2.5	+2.5
Total formal votes		50,666	95.0	−0.1
Informal votes		2,640	5.0	+0.1
Turnout		53,306	87.7	+2.1
Two-party-preferred result
Labor	Nathan Hagarty	27,625	58.9	+7.4
Liberal	Therese Fedeli	19,300	41.1	−7.4
Labor hold		Swing	+7.4	

=== Lismore ===
2023 New South Wales state election: Lismore
Party	Candidate	Votes	%	±%
Labor	Janelle Saffin	21,615	44.4	+19.0
National	Alex Rubin	13,581	27.9	−11.2
Greens	Adam Guise	6,979	14.3	−10.8
Shooters, Fishers, Farmers	Matthew Bertalli	3,347	6.9	+6.9
Animal Justice	Vanessa Rosayro	1,196	2.5	0.0
Independent	James McKenzie	791	1.6	+1.6
Sustainable Australia	Ross Honniball	666	1.4	−0.2
Independent	Allen Crosthwaite	511	1.0	+1.0
Total formal votes		48,686	97.4	+0.4
Informal votes		1,312	2.6	−0.4
Turnout		49,998	87.1	−1.1
Two-party-preferred result
Labor	Janelle Saffin	28,163	65.0	+13.0
National	Alex Rubin	15,172	35.0	−13.0
Labor hold		Swing	+13.0	

=== Liverpool ===
2023 New South Wales state election: Liverpool
Party	Candidate	Votes	%	±%
Labor	Charishma Kaliyanda	22,681	47.2	−7.9
Liberal	Richard Ammoun	16,409	34.1	+7.8
Independent	Michael Andjelkovic	3,508	7.3	+7.3
Greens	Amy Croft	3,039	6.3	+0.9
Animal Justice	Gabriel Hancock	1,446	3.0	+3.0
	Linda Harris	982	2.0	+2.0
Total formal votes		48,065	94.0	−0.8
Informal votes		3,047	6.0	+0.8
Turnout		51,112	84.4	−1.4
Two-party-preferred result
Labor	Charishma Kaliyanda	24,913	58.3	−9.0
Liberal	Richard Ammoun	17,783	41.7	+9.0
Labor hold		Swing	−9.0	

=== Londonderry ===
2023 New South Wales state election: Londonderry
Party	Candidate	Votes	%	±%
Labor	Prue Car	28,079	54.3	+8.0
Liberal	Samantha Talakola	15,525	30.0	−11.4
One Nation	Luke Tester	4,228	8.2	+8.2
Greens	David Maurice	2,611	5.0	+0.4
Sustainable Australia	David Bowen	1,282	2.5	−1.3
Total formal votes		51,725	96.2	+0.8
Informal votes		2,061	3.8	−0.8
Turnout		53,786	87.5	+4.6
Two-party-preferred result
Labor	Prue Car	30,145	63.7	+10.7
Liberal	Samantha Talakola	17,164	36.3	−10.7
Labor hold		Swing	+10.7	

=== Macquarie Fields ===
2023 New South Wales state election: Macquarie Fields
Party	Candidate	Votes	%	±%
Labor	Anoulack Chanthivong	28,089	57.1	+3.7
Liberal	Khairul Chowdhury	10,682	21.7	−6.8
Liberal Democrats	Gemma Noiosi	4,122	8.4	+8.3
Greens	Seamus Lee	2,349	4.8	+0.6
Animal Justice	Donna Wilson	2,346	4.8	+4.5
Sustainable Australia	Michael Clark	1,606	3.3	+3.3
Total formal votes		49,194	95.6	+0.2
Informal votes		2,266	4.4	−0.2
Turnout		51,460	86.3	−0.3
Two-party-preferred result
Labor	Anoulack Chanthivong	30,468	69.9	+5.0
Liberal	Khairul Chowdhury	13,141	30.1	−5.0
Labor hold		Swing	+5.0	

=== Maitland ===
2023 New South Wales state election: Maitland
Party	Candidate	Votes	%	±%
Labor	Jenny Aitchison	26,792	51.9	+6.6
Liberal	Michael Cooper	11,745	22.7	−2.6
One Nation	Neil Turner	4,404	8.5	−2.7
Greens	Campbell Knox	3,725	7.2	+1.1
Legalise Cannabis	Daniel Dryden	2,906	5.6	+5.6
Independent	Alex Lee	1,200	2.3	+2.3
Sustainable Australia	Sam Ferguson	861	1.7	+0.1
Total formal votes		51,633	96.5	+0.5
Informal votes		1,890	3.5	−0.5
Turnout		53,523	88.6	−0.8
Two-party-preferred result
Labor	Jenny Aitchison	30,647	68.6	+3.9
Liberal	Michael Cooper	14,012	31.4	−3.9
Labor hold		Swing	+3.9	

=== Manly ===
2023 New South Wales state election: Manly
Party	Candidate	Votes	%	±%
Liberal	James Griffin	23,764	45.0	−7.6
Independent	Joeline Hackman	14,365	27.2	+27.2
Labor	Jasper Thatcher	6,794	12.9	−5.4
Greens	Terry Le Roux	4,734	9.0	−9.4
Independent	Phillip Altman	1,395	2.6	+2.6
Animal Justice	Bailey Mason	1,062	2.0	−0.4
Sustainable Australia	Emanuele Paletto	711	1.3	−1.7
Total formal votes		52,825	97.8	+0.1
Informal votes		1,189	2.2	−0.1
Turnout		54,014	88.5	−0.9
Notional two-party-preferred count
Liberal	James Griffin	27,679	62.5	−2.1
Labor	Jasper Thatcher	16,592	37.5	+2.1
Two-candidate-preferred result
Liberal	James Griffin	25,541	54.8	−8.3
Independent	Joeline Hackman	21,027	45.2	+45.2
Liberal hold				

=== Maroubra ===
2023 New South Wales state election: Maroubra
Party	Candidate	Votes	%	±%
Labor	Michael Daley	27,076	54.4	+12.5
Liberal	Bill Burst	13,378	26.9	−5.1
Greens	Kym Chapple	5,835	11.7	+4.4
Informed Medical Options	Roderick Aguilar	1,554	3.1	+3.1
Animal Justice	Holly Williamson	1,096	2.2	+2.2
Sustainable Australia	Monique Isenheim	850	1.7	−0.2
Total formal votes		49,789	97.0	−0.2
Informal votes		1,516	3.0	+0.2
Turnout		51,305	86.3	−1.0
Two-party-preferred result
Labor	Michael Daley	31,677	68.7	+10.4
Liberal	Bill Burst	14,427	31.3	−10.4
Labor hold		Swing	+10.4	

=== Miranda ===
2023 New South Wales state election: Miranda
Party	Candidate	Votes	%	±%
Liberal	Eleni Petinos	24,017	45.4	−8.8
Labor	Simon Earle	19,781	37.4	+10.2
Greens	Martin Moore	3,842	7.3	+0.5
Independent	Gaye Cameron	2,712	5.1	+5.1
Sustainable Australia	Nick Hughes	2,512	4.8	+2.8
Total formal votes		52,864	97.1	−0.3
Informal votes		1,601	2.9	+0.3
Turnout		54,465	91.1	+1.4
Two-party-preferred result
Liberal	Eleni Petinos	25,503	52.3	−12.1
Labor	Simon Earle	23,214	47.7	+12.1
Liberal hold		Swing	−12.1	

=== Monaro ===
2023 New South Wales state election: Monaro
Party	Candidate	Votes	%	±%
National	Nichole Overall	19,890	39.1	−13.2
Labor	Steve Whan	19,401	38.1	+11.0
Greens	Jenny Goldie	3,924	7.7	−0.2
Shooters, Fishers, Farmers	Chris Pryor	3,077	6.1	−1.7
Independent	Andrew Thaler	1,855	3.6	+3.6
Legalise Cannabis	Josie Tanson	1,722	3.4	+3.4
Sustainable Australia	James Holgate	987	1.9	+1.9
Total formal votes		50,856	97.5	+0.1
Informal votes		1,313	2.5	−0.1
Turnout		52,169	87.7	−0.2
Two-party-preferred result
Labor	Steve Whan	23,757	52.3	+13.9
National	Nichole Overall	21,676	47.7	−13.9
Labor gain from National		Swing	+13.9	

=== Mount Druitt ===
2023 New South Wales state election: Mount Druitt
Party	Candidate	Votes	%	±%
Labor	Edmond Atalla	29,710	60.9	+2.0
Liberal	Kandathil Sunil Jayadevan	11,470	23.5	−2.6
Greens	Asm Morshed	4,173	8.6	+1.9
Animal Justice	Andrew Dudas	3,393	7.0	+7.0
Total formal votes		48,746	94.6	−0.3
Informal votes		2,759	5.4	+0.3
Turnout		51,505	82.6	−1.6
Two-party-preferred result
Labor	Edmond Atalla	32,606	72.4	+3.8
Liberal	Kandathil Sunil Jayadevan	12,435	27.6	−3.8
Labor hold		Swing	+3.8	

=== Murray ===
2023 New South Wales state election: Murray
Party	Candidate	Votes	%	±%
Independent	Helen Dalton	24,824	50.2	+50.2
National	Peta Betts	12,974	26.3	−8.4
Labor	Max Buljubasic	4,124	8.3	−0.7
Shooters, Fishers, Farmers	Desiree Gregory	2,369	4.8	−33.3
Legalise Cannabis	Adrian Carle	1,840	3.7	+3.7
Ind. Riverina State	David Landini	1,207	2.4	+0.3
Greens	Amelia King	913	1.8	−0.8
Public Education	Kevin Farrell	446	0.9	+0.9
Sustainable Australia	Michael Florance	404	0.8	−0.3
Independent	Greg Adamson	314	0.6	+0.6
Total formal votes		49,415	96.8	+0.7
Informal votes		1,631	3.2	−0.7
Turnout		51,046	86.3	−1.8
Notional two-party-preferred count
National	Peta Betts	17,003	72.1	−2.7
Labor	Max Buljubasic	6,570	27.9	+2.7
Two-candidate-preferred result
Independent	Helen Dalton	27,260	66.0	+66.0
National	Peta Betts	14,035	34.0	−13.2
Member changed to Independent from Shooters, Fishers, Farmers				

=== Myall Lakes ===
2023 New South Wales state election: Myall Lakes
Party	Candidate	Votes	%	±%
National	Tanya Thompson	24,809	47.1	−1.5
Independent	Jason Bendall	9,567	18.2	+18.2
Labor	Mark Vanstone	9,460	18.0	−11.2
Legalise Cannabis	Keys Manley	4,747	9.0	+9.0
Greens	Eleanor Spence	2,843	5.4	−0.2
Sustainable Australia	Maree McDonald-Pritchard	1,260	2.4	+0.7
Total formal votes		52,686	96.7	+0.1
Informal votes		1,786	3.3	−0.1
Turnout		54,472	88.8	−1.7
Two-party-preferred result
National	Tanya Thompson	28,362	65.8	+6.5
Labor	Mark Vanstone	14,731	34.2	−6.5
National hold		Swing	+6.5	

=== Newcastle ===
2023 New South Wales state election: Newcastle
Party	Candidate	Votes	%	±%
Labor	Tim Crakanthorp	25,078	49.4	+3.6
Liberal	Thomas Triebsees	11,348	22.4	−4.1
Greens	John Mackenzie	9,487	18.7	+2.0
Legalise Cannabis	Tim Claydon	3,042	6.0	+6.0
Sustainable Australia	Freya Taylor	1,195	2.4	0.0
Socialist Alliance	Niko Leka	586	1.2	−0.6
Total formal votes		50,736	97.8	+1.0
Informal votes		1,162	2.2	−1.0
Turnout		51,898	87.3	+0.4
Two-party-preferred result
Labor	Tim Crakanthorp	33,422	72.6	+5.1
Liberal	Thomas Triebsees	12,620	27.4	−5.1
Labor hold		Swing	+5.1	

=== Newtown ===
2023 New South Wales state election: Newtown
Party	Candidate	Votes	%	±%
Greens	Jenny Leong	26,758	54.1	+9.9
Labor	David Hetherington	15,104	30.5	+1.9
Liberal	Fiona Douskou	6,365	12.9	−1.7
Sustainable Australia	Christopher Thomas	1,275	2.6	+0.8
Total formal votes		49,502	98.5	+0.6
Informal votes		769	1.5	−0.6
Turnout		50,271	84.4	−0.8
Notional two-party-preferred count
Labor	David Hetherington	35,145	82.3	+4.1
Liberal	Fiona Douskou	7,553	17.7	−4.1
Two-candidate-preferred result
Greens	Jenny Leong	28,015	62.1	+0.7
Labor	David Hetherington	17,094	37.9	−0.7
Greens hold		Swing	+0.7	

=== North Shore ===
2023 New South Wales state election: North Shore
Party	Candidate	Votes	%	±%
Liberal	Felicity Wilson	21,308	44.23	−2.37
Independent	Helen Conway	10,527	21.85	+21.85
Labor	Godfrey Santer	8,239	17.10	+4.75
Greens	James Mullan	5,305	11.01	−0.28
Independent	Victoria Walker	1,107	2.30	+2.30
Sustainable Australia	Lachlan Commins	901	1.87	+0.49
Informed Medical Options	Michael Antares	790	1.64	+1.64
Total formal votes		48,177	98.08	−0.44
Informal votes		945	1.92	+0.44
Turnout		49,122	87.03	−0.61
Notional two-party-preferred count
Liberal	Felicity Wilson	24,208	58.22	−9.63
Labor	Godfrey Santer	17,371	41.78	+9.63
Two-candidate-preferred result
Liberal	Felicity Wilson	23,040	55.69	−5.44
Independent	Helen Conway	18,329	44.31	+44.31
Liberal hold				

=== Northern Tablelands ===
2023 New South Wales state election: Northern Tablelands
Party	Candidate	Votes	%	±%
National	Adam Marshall	35,575	71.6	−1.8
Labor	Yvonne Langenberg	5,045	10.2	−0.8
Greens	Elizabeth O'Hara	2,369	4.8	−0.8
Shooters, Fishers, Farmers	Michael Hay	2,239	4.5	−5.1
Legalise Cannabis	Peter O'Loghlin	1,148	2.3	+2.3
Independent	Billy Wood	980	2.0	+2.0
Liberal Democrats	Margaret Hammond	783	1.6	+1.6
Sustainable Australia	Alan Crowe	595	1.2	+1.2
Independent	Natasha Ledger	496	1.0	+1.0
Public Education	Gary Hampton	425	0.9	+0.9
Total formal votes		49,655	98.0	−0.1
Informal votes		1,039	2.0	+0.1
Turnout		50,694	87.6	−3.1
Two-party-preferred result
National	Adam Marshall	37,654	83.8	+0.7
Labor	Yvonne Langenberg	7,255	16.2	−0.7
National hold		Swing	+0.7	

=== Oatley ===
2023 New South Wales state election: Oatley
Party	Candidate	Votes	%	±%
Liberal	Mark Coure	22,877	45.6	−5.3
Labor	Ash Ambihaipahar	19,851	39.5	+3.8
Greens	Taylor Vandijk	3,101	6.2	−0.3
Independent	Natalie Mort	2,677	5.3	+5.3
Sustainable Australia	Glenn Hunt	1,690	3.4	+3.4
Total formal votes		50,196	96.9	+0.2
Informal votes		1,625	3.1	−0.2
Turnout		51,821	90.4	−2.4
Two-party-preferred result
Liberal	Mark Coure	23,959	50.8	−6.0
Labor	Ash Ambihaipahar	23,205	49.2	+6.0
Liberal hold		Swing	−6.0	

=== Orange ===
2023 New South Wales state election: Orange
Party	Candidate	Votes	%	±%
Independent	Philip Donato	26,815	53.08	+53.08
National	Tony Mileto	11,123	22.02	−3.80
Labor	Heather Dunn	4,939	9.78	−0.41
Shooters, Fishers, Farmers	Aaron Kelly	2,752	5.45	−43.70
Greens	David Mallard	2,149	4.25	−0.95
Legalise Cannabis	Patricia Holt	1,601	3.17	+3.17
Sustainable Australia	George Bate	785	1.55	+1.55
Public Education	Gillian Bramley	354	0.70	+0.70
Total formal votes		50,518	97.35	+0.8
Informal votes		1,377	2.65	−0.8
Turnout		51,895	89.54	−1.97
Notional two-party-preferred count
National	Tony Mileto	17,138	62.77	−2.28
Labor	Heather Dunn	10,165	37.23	+2.28
Two-candidate-preferred result
Independent	Philip Donato	31,212	71.86	+71.86
National	Tony Mileto	12,225	28.14	−6.68
Member changed to Independent from Shooters, Fishers, Farmers				

=== Oxley ===
2023 New South Wales state election: Oxley
Party	Candidate	Votes	%	±%
National	Michael Kemp	24,987	47.5	−4.9
Labor	Gregory Vigors	9,899	18.8	−1.5
Greens	Dominic King	7,420	14.1	+1.6
Legalise Cannabis	Megan Mathew	4,708	8.9	+8.9
Independent	Joshua Fairhall	2,878	5.5	+5.5
Sustainable Australia	Bianca Drain	1,400	2.7	−1.0
Independent	Troy Irwin	1,316	2.5	+2.5
Total formal votes		52,608	96.5	+0.1
Informal votes		1,880	3.5	−0.1
Turnout		54,488	86.7	−1.7
Two-party-preferred result
National	Michael Kemp	27,132	62.8	−2.6
Labor	Gregory Vigors	16,047	37.2	+2.6
National hold		Swing	−2.6	

=== Parramatta ===
2023 New South Wales state election: Parramatta
Party	Candidate	Votes	%	±%
Labor	Donna Davis	22,704	47.0	+13.0
Liberal	Katie Mullens	17,152	35.5	−14.5
Greens	Ben Hammond	4,852	10.0	+2.1
One Nation	Mritunjay Singh	2,464	5.1	+5.1
Sustainable Australia	David Moll	1,109	2.3	+1.2
Total formal votes		48,281	96.9	+0.2
Informal votes		1,519	3.1	−0.2
Turnout		49,800	85.9	+2.4
Two-party-preferred result
Labor	Donna Davis	26,355	58.6	+15.0
Liberal	Katie Mullens	18,655	41.4	−15.0
Labor gain from Liberal		Swing	+15.0	

=== Penrith ===
2023 New South Wales state election: Penrith
Party	Candidate	Votes	%	±%
Liberal	Stuart Ayres	19,266	38.3	−1.4
Labor	Karen McKeown	19,262	38.3	+1.4
One Nation	Belinda McWilliams	4,122	8.2	+1.4
Greens	Minoo Toussi	2,643	5.2	+0.6
Legalise Cannabis	Timothy Pateman	2,467	4.9	+4.9
Animal Justice	Vanessa Blazi	1,840	3.7	+2.0
Sustainable Australia	Geoff Brown	744	1.5	−0.2
Total formal votes		50,344	96.1	+0.0
Informal votes		2,047	3.9	0.0
Turnout		52,391	87.8	−0.9
Two-party-preferred result
Labor	Karen McKeown	22,661	51.6	+2.2
Liberal	Stuart Ayres	21,226	48.4	−2.2
Labor gain from Liberal		Swing	+2.2	

=== Pittwater ===
2023 New South Wales state election: Pittwater
Party	Candidate	Votes	%	±%
Liberal	Rory Amon	22,137	44.71	−12.64
Independent	Jacqui Scruby	17,754	35.86	+35.86
Labor	Jeffrey Quinn	5,039	10.18	−2.38
Greens	Hilary Green	3,386	6.84	−8.47
Sustainable Australia	Craig Law	1,195	2.41	−1.32
Total formal votes		49,511	97.75	+0.42
Informal votes		1,139	2.25	−0.42
Turnout		50,650	90.16	+0.27
Notional two-party-preferred count
Liberal	Rory Amon	26,796	63.25	−9.11
Labor	Jeffrey Quinn	15,567	36.75	+9.11
Two-candidate-preferred result
Liberal	Rory Amon	23,365	50.66	−20.18
Independent	Jacqui Scruby	22,759	49.34	+49.34
Liberal hold				

=== Port Macquarie ===
2023 New South Wales state election: Port Macquarie
Party	Candidate	Votes	%	±%
Liberal	Leslie Williams	21,044	39.5	+39.5
National	Peta Pinson	13,675	25.6	−37.9
Labor	Keith McMullen	10,265	19.2	−4.1
Greens	Stuart Watson	3,473	6.5	−1.4
Legalise Cannabis	Vivian McMahon	2,212	4.1	+4.1
Informed Medical Options	Silvia Mogorovich	1,229	2.3	+2.3
Sustainable Australia	Edward Coleman	809	1.5	−3.7
Liberal Democrats	Benjamin Read	623	1.2	+1.2
Total formal votes		53,330	97.2	+0.7
Informal votes		1,559	2.8	−0.7
Turnout		54,889	89.9	+0.3
Notional two-party-preferred count
Liberal	Leslie Williams	28,044	66.7	+66.7
Labor	Keith McMullen	14,003	33.3	+3.4
Two-candidate-preferred result
Liberal	Leslie Williams	25,372	60.8	+60.8
National	Peta Pinson	16,379	39.2	−30.9
Member changed to Liberal from National				

=== Port Stephens ===
2023 New South Wales state election: Port Stephens
Party	Candidate	Votes	%	±%
Labor	Kate Washington	27,957	53.60	+5.46
Liberal	Nathan Errington	11,883	22.78	−17.14
One Nation	Mark Watson	6,720	12.88	+12.88
Greens	Jordan Jensen	2,511	4.81	+1.01
Animal Justice	Michelle Buckmaster	1,569	3.01	+0.39
Informed Medical Options	Angela Ketas	769	1.47	+1.47
Sustainable Australia	Beverley Jelfs	752	1.44	−0.54
Total formal votes		52,161	97.18	+0.66
Informal votes		1,511	2.82	−0.66
Turnout		53,672	89.04	−2.03
Two-party-preferred result
Labor	Kate Washington	30,777	69.02	+13.27
Liberal	Nathan Errington	13,812	30.98	−13.27
Labor hold		Swing	+13.27	

=== Prospect ===
2023 New South Wales state election: Prospect
Party	Candidate	Votes	%	±%
Labor	Hugh McDermott	24,519	49.3	−1.0
Liberal	Kalvin Biag	17,903	36.0	−0.3
Greens	Sujan Selventhiran	3,610	7.3	+2.5
Sustainable Australia	Peter Shafer	1,892	3.8	+3.8
Animal Justice	Emily Walsh	1,775	3.6	+1.1
Total formal votes		49,699	95.4	−0.5
Informal votes		2,375	4.6	+0.5
Turnout		52,074	88.5	+1.2
Two-party-preferred result
Labor	Hugh McDermott	27,175	58.7	+0.1
Liberal	Kalvin Biag	19,137	41.3	−0.1
Labor hold		Swing	+0.1	

=== Riverstone ===
2023 New South Wales state election: Riverstone
Party	Candidate	Votes	%	±%
Labor	Warren Kirby	24,580	44.2	+4.2
Liberal	Mohit Kumar	22,167	39.9	−14.1
Greens	Rob Vail	3,969	7.1	+1.2
Shooters, Fishers, Farmers	Anthony Belcastro	1,816	3.3	+3.3
Independent	Tabitha Ponnambalam	1,761	3.2	+3.2
Sustainable Australia	Tim Horan	1,282	2.3	+2.3
Total formal votes		55,575	96.9	−0.2
Informal votes		1,793	3.1	+0.2
Turnout		57,368	90.4	+5.4
Two-party-preferred result
Labor	Warren Kirby	27,662	53.7	+9.9
Liberal	Mohit Kumar	23,848	46.3	−9.9
Labor gain from Liberal		Swing	+9.9	

=== Rockdale ===
2023 New South Wales state election: Rockdale
Party	Candidate	Votes	%	±%
Labor	Steve Kamper	24,893	52.9	+6.8
Liberal	Muhammad Rana	13,942	29.6	−3.6
Greens	Peter Strong	5,109	10.9	+2.8
Sustainable Australia	James Morris	3,127	6.6	+6.6
Total formal votes		47,071	95.2	−0.2
Informal votes		2,378	4.8	+0.2
Turnout		49,449	87.1	−1.5
Two-party-preferred result
Labor	Steve Kamper	28,468	65.4	+5.4
Liberal	Muhammad Rana	15,086	34.6	−5.4
Labor hold		Swing	+5.4	

=== Ryde ===
2023 New South Wales state election: Ryde
Party	Candidate	Votes	%	±%
Liberal	Jordan Lane	24,383	45.3	−4.4
Labor	Lyndal Howison	21,004	39.0	+8.6
Greens	Sophie Edington	5,772	10.7	+2.0
Sustainable Australia	Bradley Jelfs	1,357	2.5	+0.9
Informed Medical Options	Barry Devine	1,324	2.5	+2.5
Total formal votes		53,840	97.4	+0.1
Informal votes		1,441	2.6	−0.1
Turnout		55,281	89.4	+0.8
Two-party-preferred result
Liberal	Jordan Lane	25,431	50.1	−8.9
Labor	Lyndal Howison	25,377	49.9	+8.9
Liberal hold		Swing	−8.9	

=== Shellharbour ===
2023 New South Wales state election: Shellharbour
Party	Candidate	Votes	%	±%
Labor	Anna Watson	26,418	50.4	−7.2
Independent	Chris Homer	10,656	20.3	+20.3
Liberal	Mikayla Barnes	7,006	13.4	−13.8
Greens	Jamie Dixon	3,189	6.1	−3.3
Legalise Cannabis	Mia Willmott	2,246	4.3	+4.3
Liberal Democrats	Rita Granata	1,574	3.0	+3.0
Sustainable Australia	Kenneth Davis	1,306	2.5	−3.3
Total formal votes		52,395	96.2	+1.0
Informal votes		2,049	3.8	−1.0
Turnout		54,444	89.6	−2.5
Notional two-party-preferred count
Labor	Anna Watson	31,406	77.2	+8.8
Liberal	Mikayla Barnes	9,298	22.8	−8.8
Two-candidate-preferred result
Labor	Anna Watson	29,403	67.1	−1.3
Independent	Chris Homer	14,390	32.9	+32.9
Labor hold				

=== South Coast ===
2023 New South Wales state election: South Coast
Party	Candidate	Votes	%	±%
Liberal	Luke Sikora	17,806	34.72	−20.81
Labor	Liza Butler	17,414	33.96	+2.75
Greens	Amanda Findley	8,021	15.64	+2.38
Shooters, Fishers, Farmers	Robert Korten	3,996	7.79	+7.79
Independent	Nina Digiglio	3,284	6.40	+6.40
Sustainable Australia	Deanna Buffier	764	1.49	+1.49
Total formal votes		51,285	96.61	+0.55
Informal votes		1,797	3.39	−0.55
Turnout		53,082	87.56	−1.84
Two-party-preferred result
Labor	Liza Butler	23,068	53.77	+14.32
Liberal	Luke Sikora	19,834	46.23	−14.32
Labor gain from Liberal		Swing	+14.32	

=== Strathfield ===
2023 New South Wales state election: Strathfield
Party	Candidate	Votes	%	±%
Labor	Jason Li	26,249	51.9	+7.1
Liberal	John-Paul Baladi	16,775	33.1	−5.4
Greens	Courtney Buckley	4,749	9.4	+0.6
Sustainable Australia	Wally Crocker	1,588	3.1	+3.1
Animal Justice	Maurie Saidi	1,257	2.5	+0.5
Total formal votes		50,618	97.1	+0.3
Informal votes		1,495	2.9	−0.3
Turnout		52,113	88.6	+0.8
Two-party-preferred result
Labor	Jason Li	30,228	63.0	+7.8
Liberal	John-Paul Baladi	17,717	37.0	−7.8
Labor hold		Swing	+7.8	

=== Summer Hill ===
2023 New South Wales state election: Summer Hill
Party	Candidate	Votes	%	±%
Labor	Jo Haylen	25,922	52.1	+5.7
Greens	Izabella Antoniou	12,596	25.3	+4.9
Liberal	Bowen Cheng	8,340	16.8	−7.2
Animal Justice	Sandra Haddad	1,567	3.1	+0.8
Sustainable Australia	Michael Swan	1,333	2.7	+1.3
Total formal votes		49,758	97.5	+0.5
Informal votes		1,277	2.5	−0.5
Turnout		51,035	88.5	+0.7
Notional two-party-preferred count
Labor	Jo Haylen	37,057	79.8	+8.2
Liberal	Bowen Cheng	9,373	20.2	−8.2
Two-candidate-preferred result
Labor	Jo Haylen	28,598	66.3	−0.2
Greens	Izabella Antoniou	14,536	33.7	+0.2
Labor hold		Swing	−0.2	

=== Swansea ===
2023 New South Wales state election: Swansea
Party	Candidate	Votes	%	±%
Labor	Yasmin Catley	27,943	53.6	+3.9
Liberal	Megan Anderson	14,590	28.0	−4.9
Greens	Heather Foord	4,463	8.6	+1.4
Sustainable Australia	Alan Ellis	3,253	6.2	+6.2
Liberal Democrats	Paul Jackson	1,918	3.7	+3.7
Total formal votes		52,167	96.3	+0.6
Informal votes		2,010	3.7	−0.6
Turnout		54,177	88.9	−2.1
Two-party-preferred result
Labor	Yasmin Catley	30,972	65.4	+4.8
Liberal	Megan Anderson	16,351	34.6	−4.8
Labor hold		Swing	+4.8	

=== Sydney ===
2023 New South Wales state election: Sydney
Party	Candidate	Votes	%	±%
Independent	Alex Greenwich	20,025	41.1	+4.4
Liberal	Phyllisse Stanton	11,219	23.0	−5.4
Labor	Skye Tito	10,575	21.7	+5.5
Greens	Nick Ward	5,949	12.2	−0.5
Sustainable Australia	Mark Whitton	972	2.0	+0.3
Total formal votes		48,740	98.2	+0.1
Informal votes		900	1.8	−0.1
Turnout		49,640	79.4	−0.3
Notional two-party-preferred count
Labor	Skye Tito	22,054	61.3	+11.2
Liberal	Phyllisse Stanton	13,936	38.7	−11.2
Two-candidate-preferred result
Independent	Alex Greenwich	26,600	65.6	−10.4
Labor	Skye Tito	13,921	34.4	+10.4
Independent hold		Swing	−10.4	

=== Tamworth ===
2023 New South Wales state election: Tamworth
Party	Candidate	Votes	%	±%
National	Kevin Anderson	27,333	51.7	−1.8
Independent	Mark Rodda	10,418	19.7	+4.0
Labor	Kate McGrath	6,864	13.0	+3.8
Shooters, Fishers, Farmers	Matthew Scanlan	3,705	7.0	−9.8
Greens	Ryan Brooke	1,786	3.4	+0.6
Legalise Cannabis	Sue Raye	1,554	2.9	+2.9
Informed Medical Options	Rebecca McCredie	887	1.7	+1.7
Sustainable Australia	Colin Drain	328	0.6	+0.5
Total formal votes		52,875	97.5	−0.3
Informal votes		1,374	2.5	+0.3
Turnout		54,249	89.3	−1.4
Notional two-party-preferred count
National	Kevin Anderson	32,433	74.2	−3.8
Labor	Kate McGrath	11,292	25.8	+3.8
Two-candidate-preferred result
National	Kevin Anderson	29,998	65.8	−5.0
Independent	Mark Rodda	15,601	34.2	+5.0
National hold		Swing	−5.0	

=== Terrigal ===
2023 New South Wales state election: Terrigal
Party	Candidate	Votes	%	±%
Liberal	Adam Crouch	23,507	46.6	−6.3
Labor	Sam Boughton	19,703	39.0	+12.9
Greens	Imogen da Silva	4,868	9.6	−0.4
Sustainable Australia	Wayne Rigg	2,392	4.7	+2.8
Total formal votes		50,470	97.5	+0.8
Informal votes		1,270	2.5	−0.8
Turnout		51,740	89.1	−1.2
Two-party-preferred result
Liberal	Adam Crouch	24,467	51.2	−11.1
Labor	Sam Boughton	23,300	48.8	+11.1
Liberal hold		Swing	−11.1	

=== The Entrance ===
2023 New South Wales state election: The Entrance
Party	Candidate	Votes	%	±%
Labor	David Mehan	22,153	45.0	+1.7
Liberal	Nathan Bracken	17,433	35.4	−2.3
Greens	Ralph Stephenson	4,206	8.6	+0.7
Sustainable Australia	Georgia Lamb	2,131	4.3	+1.9
Animal Justice	Fardin Pelarek	1,896	3.9	−0.2
Liberal Democrats	Bentley Logan	1,372	2.8	+2.8
Total formal votes		49,191	96.7	+1.0
Informal votes		1,688	3.3	−1.0
Turnout		50,879	86.7	−3.2
Two-party-preferred result
Labor	David Mehan	25,782	57.8	+2.5
Liberal	Nathan Bracken	18,793	42.2	−2.5
Labor hold		Swing	+2.5	

=== Tweed ===
2023 New South Wales state election: Tweed
Party	Candidate	Votes	%	±%
National	Geoff Provest	20,494	43.89	−3.66
Labor	Craig Elliot	14,425	30.90	−0.07
Greens	Ciara Denham	5,517	11.82	−2.03
Legalise Cannabis	Marc Selan	2,534	5.43	+5.43
Sustainable Australia	Ronald McDonald	2,298	4.92	+1.11
Animal Justice	Susie Hearder	1,422	3.05	−0.79
Total formal votes		46,690	96.33	+0.32
Informal votes		1,777	3.67	−0.32
Turnout		48,467	84.08	−1.27
Two-party-preferred result
National	Geoff Provest	22,075	53.58	−1.39
Labor	Craig Elliot	19,125	46.42	+1.39
National hold		Swing	−1.39	

=== Upper Hunter ===
2023 New South Wales state election: Upper Hunter
Party	Candidate	Votes	%	±%
National	Dave Layzell	19,868	37.0	+7.6
Labor	Peree Watson	15,488	28.9	−2.0
Shooters, Fishers, Farmers	James White	6,302	11.7	−7.3
Independent	Dale McNamara	5,190	9.7	+9.7
Greens	Tony Lonergan	3,207	6.0	+0.5
Legalise Cannabis	Tom Lillicrap	2,743	5.1	+5.1
Sustainable Australia	Calum Blair	862	1.6	+1.6
Total formal votes		53,660	96.6	+0.1
Informal votes		1,871	3.4	−0.1
Turnout		55,531	89.2	−2.5
Two-party-preferred result
National	Dave Layzell	22,964	53.8	+3.3
Labor	Peree Watson	19,732	46.2	−3.3
National hold		Swing	+3.3	

=== Vaucluse ===
2023 New South Wales state election: Vaucluse
Party	Candidate	Votes	%	±%
Liberal	Kellie Sloane	24,184	50.1	−6.8
Independent	Karen Freyer	8,236	17.1	+17.1
Labor	Margaret Merten	7,336	15.2	+2.5
Greens	Dominic Wy Kanak	5,632	11.7	−2.1
Liberal Democrats	Gail Stevens	1,166	2.4	+2.4
Sustainable Australia	Kay Dunne	863	1.8	+0.4
Animal Justice	Edward Cameron	846	1.8	+0.4
Total formal votes		48,263	97.9	−0.3
Informal votes		1,055	2.1	+0.3
Turnout		49,318	83.1	−0.7
Notional two-party-preferred count
Liberal	Kellie Sloane	26,574	65.6	−5.0
Labor	Margaret Merten	13,960	34.4	+5.0
Two-candidate-preferred result
Liberal	Kellie Sloane	25,763	62.9	−6.5
Independent	Karen Freyer	15,206	37.1	+37.1
Liberal hold				

=== Wagga Wagga ===
2023 New South Wales state election: Wagga Wagga
Party	Candidate	Votes	%	±%
Independent	Joe McGirr	21,783	44.2	−1.9
National	Andrianna Benjamin	7,267	14.7	−11.3
Labor	Keryn Foley	6,729	13.6	−1.1
Liberal	Julia Ham	6,526	13.2	+13.2
Shooters, Fishers, Farmers	Christopher Smith	3,777	7.7	−1.1
Greens	Ray Goodlass	2,764	5.6	+2.8
Public Education	Raymond Gentles	464	0.9	+0.9
Total formal votes		49,310	96.6	−0.2
Informal votes		1,721	3.4	+0.2
Turnout		51,031	88.9	−1.5
Notional two-party-preferred count
National	Andrianna Benjamin	16,287	56.2	−1.3
Labor	Keryn Foley	12,719	43.8	+1.3
Two-candidate-preferred result
Independent	Joe McGirr	28,435	72.4	+6.9
National	Andrianna Benjamin	10,847	27.6	−6.9
Independent hold		Swing	+6.9	

=== Wahroonga ===
2023 New South Wales state election: Wahroonga
Party	Candidate	Votes	%	±%
Liberal	Alister Henskens	26,727	50.5	−7.7
Labor	Parsia Abedini	12,242	23.1	+3.9
Greens	Tim Dashwood	7,387	13.9	+1.1
Independent	Kristyn Haywood	4,927	9.3	+9.3
Sustainable Australia	Stephen Molloy	1,676	3.2	+0.2
Total formal votes		52,959	97.9	+0.2
Informal votes		1,116	2.1	−0.2
Turnout		54,075	91.5	+2.5
Two-party-preferred result
Liberal	Alister Henskens	28,940	60.6	−8.4
Labor	Parsia Abedini	18,849	39.4	+8.4
Liberal hold		Swing	−8.4	

=== Wakehurst ===
2023 New South Wales state election: Wakehurst
Party	Candidate	Votes	%	±%
Liberal	Toby Williams	18,940	36.9	−23.0
Independent	Michael Regan	18,430	35.9	+35.9
Labor	Sue Wright	7,617	14.8	−2.1
Greens	Ethan Hrnjak	4,000	7.8	−2.4
Animal Justice	Susan Sorensen	1,220	2.4	−0.8
Sustainable Australia	Greg Mawson	1,127	2.2	−0.7
Total formal votes		51,334	97.4	+0.3
Informal votes		1,353	2.6	−0.3
Turnout		52,687	90.7	+2.1
Notional two-party-preferred count
Liberal	Toby Williams	23,685	59.6	−12.3
Labor	Sue Wright	16,054	40.4	+12.3
Two-candidate-preferred result
Independent	Michael Regan	24,589	54.5	+54.5
Liberal	Toby Williams	20,555	45.5	−26.4
Independent gain from Liberal				

=== Wallsend ===
2023 New South Wales state election: Wallsend
Party	Candidate	Votes	%	±%
Labor	Sonia Hornery	33,127	63.9	+1.4
Liberal	Callum Pull	6,988	13.5	−6.5
Greens	Rebecca Watkins	5,545	10.7	+1.5
One Nation	Pietro Di Girolamo	3,532	6.8	+6.8
Animal Justice	Anna Nolan	1,088	2.1	−2.2
Independent	Joshua Starrett	811	1.6	+1.6
Sustainable Australia	Paul Akers	717	1.4	+1.4
Total formal votes		51,808	97.4	+1.0
Informal votes		1,365	2.6	−1.0
Turnout		53,173	88.4	−0.6
Two-party-preferred result
Labor	Sonia Hornery	38,043	81.8	+5.9
Liberal	Callum Pull	8,489	18.2	−5.9
Labor hold		Swing	+5.9	

=== Willoughby ===
2023 New South Wales state election: Willoughby
Party	Candidate	Votes	%	±%
Liberal	Tim James	23,032	43.6	−13.4
Independent	Larissa Penn	14,064	26.6	+17.6
Labor	Sarah Griffin	10,577	20.0	+5.3
Greens	Edmund McGrath	4,190	7.9	−3.4
Sustainable Australia	Michael Want	967	1.8	+0.1
Total formal votes		52,830	98.1	+0.1
Informal votes		1,014	1.9	−0.1
Turnout		53,844	89.3	+0.0
Notional two-party-preferred count
Liberal	Tim James	26,152	55.9	−14.8
Labor	Sarah Griffin	20,665	44.1	+14.8
Two-candidate-preferred result
Liberal	Tim James	24,727	52.6	−21.0
Independent	Larissa Penn	22,277	47.4	+21.0
Liberal hold		Swing	−21.0	

=== Winston Hills ===
2023 New South Wales state election: Winston Hills
Party	Candidate	Votes	%	±%
Liberal	Mark Taylor	25,251	47.5	−1.9
Labor	Sameer Pandey	21,030	39.5	+3.0
Greens	Damien Atkins	4,669	8.8	+1.9
Sustainable Australia	Anthony Chadszinow	2,262	4.3	+2.9
Total formal votes		53,212	96.7	−0.0
Informal votes		1,813	3.3	+0.0
Turnout		55,025	89.5	−1.4
Two-party-preferred result
Liberal	Mark Taylor	26,203	51.8	−3.9
Labor	Sameer Pandey	24,381	48.2	+3.9
Liberal hold		Swing	−3.9	

=== Wollondilly ===
2023 New South Wales state election: Wollondilly
Party	Candidate	Votes	%	±%
Liberal	Nathaniel Smith	17,712	33.8	−4.7
Independent	Judy Hannan	13,586	25.9	+6.1
Labor	Angus Braiden	11,505	22.0	+6.9
One Nation	Rebecca Thompson	6,158	11.8	+0.7
Greens	Jason Webster	2,616	5.0	−0.6
Sustainable Australia	Ildiko Haag	792	1.5	+1.5
Total formal votes		52,369	96.9	+0.4
Informal votes		1,698	3.1	−0.4
Turnout		54,067	90.5	−0.2
Notional two-party-preferred count
Liberal	Nathaniel Smith	22,300	55.0	−9.1
Labor	Angus Braiden	18,212	45.0	+9.1
Two-candidate-preferred result
Independent	Judy Hannan	21,588	51.5	+7.5
Liberal	Nathaniel Smith	20,312	48.5	−7.5
Independent gain from Liberal		Swing	+7.5	

=== Wollongong ===
2023 New South Wales state election: Wollongong
Party	Candidate	Votes	%	±%
Labor	Paul Scully	27,723	56.5	+4.9
Liberal	Joel Johnson	10,776	22.0	+0.8
Greens	Cath Blakey	8,216	16.7	+3.4
Animal Justice	Kristen Nelson	2,347	4.8	+2.3
Total formal votes		49,062	96.1	+0.5
Informal votes		2,011	3.9	−0.5
Turnout		51,073	86.8	−1.6
Two-party-preferred result
Labor	Paul Scully	33,962	74.3	+1.5
Liberal	Joel Johnson	11,727	25.7	−1.5
Labor hold		Swing	+1.5	

=== Wyong ===
2023 New South Wales state election: Wyong
Party	Candidate	Votes	%	±%
Labor	David Harris	24,575	52.2	−0.3
Liberal	Matt Squires (disendorsed)	9,929	21.1	−10.4
One Nation	Martin Stevenson	6,850	14.6	+14.6
Greens	Doug Williamson	3,795	8.1	−1.3
Sustainable Australia	Susan Newbury	1,897	4.0	+4.0
Total formal votes		47,046	96.0	+1.2
Informal votes		1,968	4.0	−1.2
Turnout		49,014	86.3	−0.9
Two-party-preferred result
Labor	David Harris	27,899	69.8	+6.9
Liberal	Matt Squires (disendorsed)	12,048	30.2	−6.9
Labor hold		Swing	+6.9	

== Preference flows ==
Minor party preference flows
Party	Coalition		Labor		Exhausted	
Party	%	±	%	±	%	±
Greens	7.3%	–0.3	59.5%	+7.0	33.2%	–6.5
Sustainable Australia	19.8%	+2.1	26.7%	+2.8	53.5%	–4.9
One Nation	26.1%	+8.1	11.7%	+0.8	62.2%	–8.9
SFF	24.8%	+8.1	14.3%	–2.1	61.0%	–5.9
Legalise Cannabis	23.3%	N/A	14.9%	N/A	61.8%	N/A
Animal Justice	13.7%	+1.6	30.5%	+3.2	55.8%	–4.8
Liberal Democrats	36.2%	+12.5	9.9%	+1.7	53.9%	–14.2
Independent	18.4%	+1.2	25.8%	+3.5	55.9%	–4.6
Others	23.6%	+4.3	21.2%	–2.8	55.3%	–1.5
