= Electoral results for the district of Menai =

Election results for Menai, New South Wales, Australia

Menai, an electoral district of the Legislative Assembly in the Australian state of New South Wales was created in 1999 and abolished in 2015.

Election	Member	Party
1999	Alison Megarrity	Labor
2003	Alison Megarrity	Labor
2007	Alison Megarrity	Labor
2011	Melanie Gibbons	Liberal

== Election results ==
=== Elections in the 2010s ===
==== 2011 ====
2011 New South Wales state election: Menai
Party	Candidate	Votes	%	±%
Liberal	Melanie Gibbons	27,593	61.0	+18.4
Labor	Peter Scaysbrook	8,732	19.3	−26.1
Greens	Simone Morrissey	3,502	7.7	+3.2
Independent	Jim McGoldrick	3,040	6.7	+6.7
Christian Democrats	Lindsay Johnson	2,371	5.2	+5.2
Total formal votes		45,238	96.8	−0.7
Informal votes		1,479	3.2	+0.7
Turnout		46,717	94.3	+0.2
Two-party-preferred result
Liberal	Melanie Gibbons	29,954	74.4	+27.1
Labor	Peter Scaysbrook	10,313	25.6	−27.1
Liberal gain from Labor		Swing	−27.1	

=== Elections in the 2000s ===
==== 2007 ====
2007 New South Wales state election: Menai
Party	Candidate	Votes	%	±%
Labor	Alison Megarrity	19,276	45.4	−6.5
Liberal	Steve Simpson	18,100	42.6	+5.4
Greens	Neerav Bhatt	1,915	4.5	−0.5
Against Further Immigration	John Collins	1,314	3.1	+3.0
Independent	Chris McLachlan	1,104	2.6	+2.6
Democrats	Mark Clyburn	751	1.8	+0.8
Total formal votes		42,460	97.5	−0.3
Informal votes		1,084	2.5	+0.3
Turnout		43,544	94.1	
Two-party-preferred result
Labor	Alison Megarrity	21,045	52.7	−6.2
Liberal	Steve Simpson	18,912	47.3	+6.2
Labor hold		Swing	−6.2	

==== 2003 ====
2003 New South Wales state election: Menai
Party	Candidate	Votes	%	±%
Labor	Alison Megarrity	23,332	52.6	+9.4
Liberal	Brett Thomas	16,326	36.8	−0.2
Greens	Tina Palladinetti	2,059	4.6	+0.4
One Nation	Susan Oz	954	2.2	−5.8
Independent	Michael Byrne	814	1.8	+1.8
Democrats	Gemma Edgar	478	1.1	−1.8
Unity	Thomas Su	359	0.8	+0.8
Total formal votes		44,322	97.8	+0.7
Informal votes		1,010	2.2	−0.7
Turnout		45,332	93.6	
Two-party-preferred result
Labor	Alison Megarrity	24,873	59.5	+5.3
Liberal	Brett Thomas	16,906	40.5	−5.3
Labor hold		Swing	+5.3	

=== Elections in the 1990s ===
==== 1999 ====
1999 New South Wales state election: Menai
Party	Candidate	Votes	%	±%
Labor	Alison Megarrity	18,048	43.2	+1.9
Liberal	Brett Thomas	15,434	37.0	−8.0
One Nation	Dorothy Hutton	3,360	8.0	+8.0
Greens	Jim McGoldrick	1,743	4.2	+4.2
Independent	Bob May	1,235	3.0	+3.0
Democrats	Anthony Mayne	1,216	2.9	+2.9
Against Further Immigration	Robert Wardle	711	1.7	−2.3
Total formal votes		41,747	97.1	+1.6
Informal votes		1,242	2.9	−1.6
Turnout		42,989	94.3	
Two-party-preferred result
Labor	Alison Megarrity	20,166	54.2	+6.1
Liberal	Brett Thomas	17,044	45.8	−6.1
Labor notional gain from Liberal		Swing	+6.1	
