= Charishma Kaliyanda =

Australian politician

Charishma Kaliyanda MP
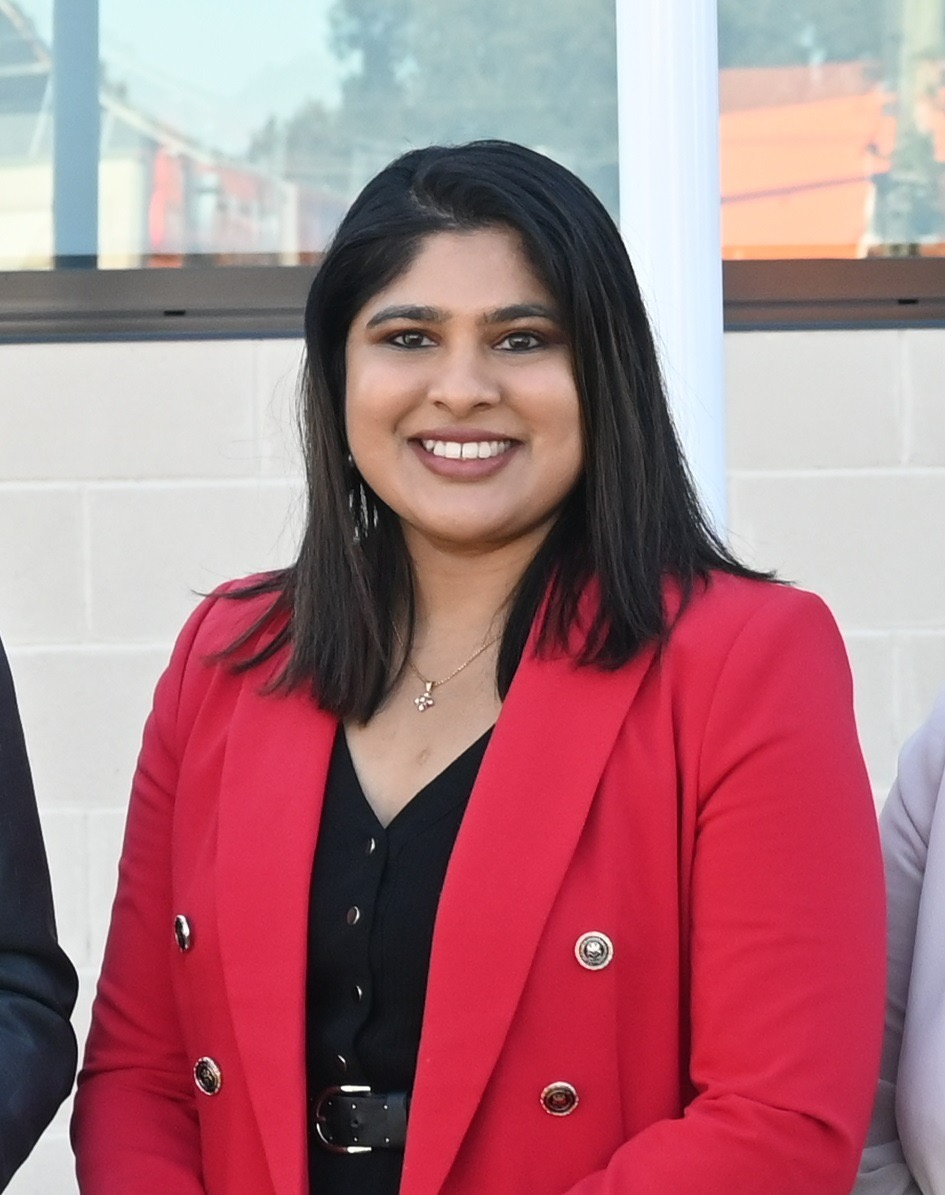

Member of the New South Wales Legislative Assembly for Liverpool
- Incumbent
- Assumed office 25 March 2023
- Preceded by: Paul Lynch

Parliamentary Secretary for Emergency Services, Youth Justice, Customer Service and Digital Government
- Incumbent
- Assumed office 16 June 2024
- Minister: Jihad Dib
- Preceded by: Anthony D'Adam

Councillor of the City of Liverpool for South Ward
- In office 2016–2024
- Preceded by: Anne Stanley
- Succeeded by: Ethan Monaghan

Personal details
- Born: India
- Party: Labor
- Occupation: Occupational therapist

Charishma Kaliyanda is an Australian politician who is a member of the New South Wales Legislative Assembly representing Liverpool since 2023. She previously served as a Councillor on the City of Liverpool.

== Early life and career ==
Kaliyanda was born in India. She migrated to Australia as a four-year-old with her parents and brother and was raised in Liverpool. She is a registered Occupational Therapist, having completed a master's degree in the subject.

She has previously worked full-time for an industry group helping engineers into the workforce and has worked as Community Engagement and Development Officer with headspace.

== Political career ==
Kaliyanda joined the Australian Labor Party in the late 2000s. She was a candidate for the North Ward of Liverpool City Council in 2012 but was not elected.

She was announced as the party's endorsed candidate for the new New South Wales state seat of Holsworthy for the 2015 New South Wales state election but she was defeated by the incumbent Menai member Melanie Gibbons.

Kaliyanda was elected to Liverpool City Council for the South Ward in 2016. She was endorsed as the Labor candidate for Holsworthy again at the 2019 election but was defeated by Gibbons for a second time. Kaliyanda was re-elected to Liverpool City Council in 2021. She was endorsed as the Labor candidate for the safe seat of Liverpool at the 2023 election and was elected a member of the New South Wales Legislative Assembly in 2023.

In October 2023, Kaliyanda signed an open letter which condemned attacks against Israeli and Palestinian civilians during the Gaza war. In 2024, she was appointed as Parliamentary Secretary for Emergency Services, Youth Justice, Customer Service and Digital Government.
