= 2021 Upper Hunter state by-election =

- 22 May 2021

Electoral district of Upper Hunter in the New South Wales Legislative Assembly
- Opinion polls
- Registered: 56,127
- Turnout: 86.74 ▼3.80

	First party	Second party
Candidate	Dave Layzell	Jeff Drayton
Party	National	Labor
Primary vote	14,805	10,055
Percentage	31.20%	21.19%
Swing	▼2.79	▼7.46
2PP	55.82%	44.18%
2PP swing	▲3.26	▼3.26
	Third party	Fourth party
		SFF
Candidate	Dale McNamara	Sue Gilroy
Party	One Nation	SFF
Primary vote	5,845	5,676
Percentage	12.32%	11.96%
Swing	▲12.32	▼10.08
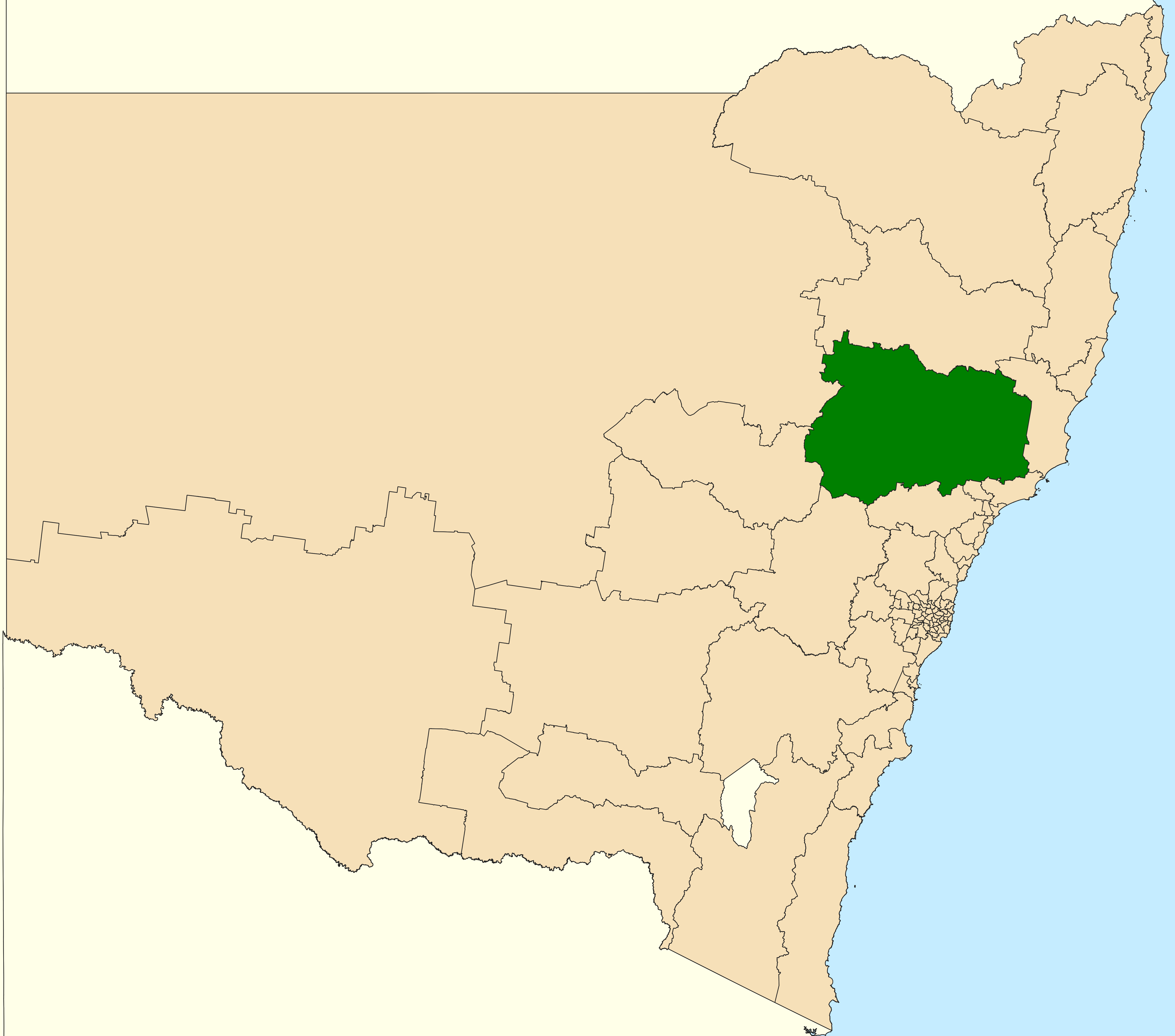
- The Electoral district of Upper Hunter in New South Wales
MP before election
Michael Johnsen
National
Elected MP
Dave Layzell
National

The 2021 Upper Hunter by-election was held on 22 May 2021 to elect the member for Upper Hunter in the New South Wales Legislative Assembly, following the resignation of National Party MP Michael Johnsen.

At around 8:30 pm on the by-election night, ABC News psephologist Antony Green called the election for the Nationals candidate Dave Layzell. Although Layzell was considered the narrow favourite based on polling, he ultimately won by a margin of 5.8% in the two-candidate-preferred vote, larger than polling suggested.

== Results ==
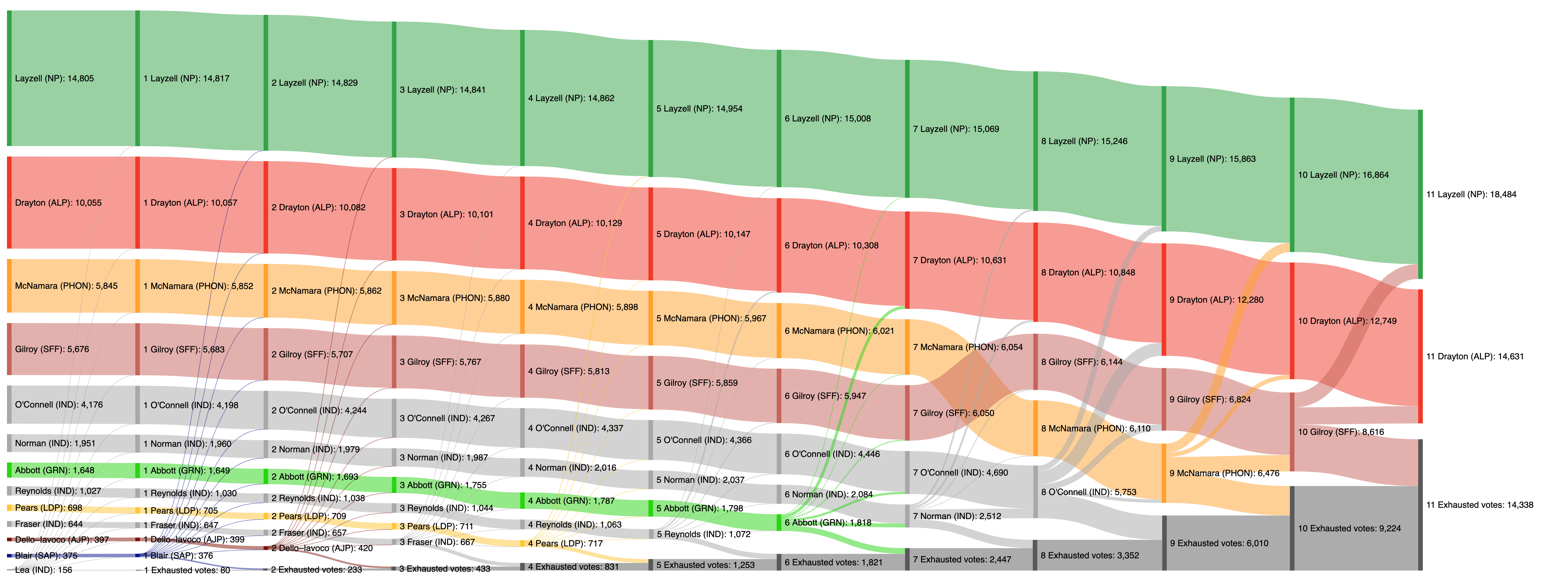
Preference flows in the 2021 Upper Hunter state by-election.

2021 Upper Hunter by-election
Party	Candidate	Votes	%	±%
National	Dave Layzell	14,805	31.20	−2.79
Labor	Jeff Drayton	10,055	21.19	−7.46
One Nation	Dale McNamara	5,845	12.32	+12.32
Shooters, Fishers, Farmers	Sue Gilroy	5,676	11.96	−10.08
Independent	Kirsty O'Connell	4,176	8.80	+8.80
Independent	Tracy Norman	1,951	4.11	+4.11
Greens	Sue Abbott	1,648	3.47	−1.31
Independent	Steven Reynolds	1,027	2.16	+2.16
Liberal Democrats	Eva Pears	698	1.47	−2.96
Independent	Kate Fraser	644	1.36	+1.36
Animal Justice	Michael Dello-Iacovo	397	0.84	−1.14
Sustainable Australia	Calum Blair	375	0.79	−1.43
Independent	Archie Lea	156	0.33	+0.33
Total formal votes		47,453	97.47	+0.85
Informal votes		1,234	2.53	−0.85
Turnout		48,687	86.74	−3.80
Two-party-preferred result
National	Dave Layzell	18,484	55.82	+3.26
Labor	Jeff Drayton	14,631	44.18	−3.26
National hold		Swing	+3.26	

== Background ==
On 24 March 2021, Labor MP for Blue Mountains Trish Doyle used parliamentary privilege to accuse an unnamed government MP of raping a sex worker. Later that day Michael Johnsen, the MP for Upper Hunter, issued a statement that confirmed he was the man accused of the rape, but maintained his innocence. Johnsen announced he would resign from his parliamentary secretary position and leave the government party room to sit as an independent. One week later it was revealed that Johnsen had exchanged lewd messages and explicit videos with the alleged victim while in Parliament, including a string of messages where he was in Question time. After Nationals leader John Barilaro called for him to step down, Johnsen resigned from Parliament on 31 March 2021, maintaining his innocence, but citing "the harassment of some sections of the media" as the reason for his resignation.

Two-party-preferred vote in Upper Hunter, 2007–2019
Election	2007	2011 (Note: The two-candidate preferred in the 2011 election was between the Nationals and Independent candidate Tim Duddy who received 68.3% and 31.6% respectively. The numbers in this table reflect a traditional Nationals and Labor contest.)	2015	2019
Nationals	64.70%	73.30%	52.20%	52.56%
Labor	35.30%	26.70%	47.80%	47.44%
Government	ALP	L/NP	L/NP	L/NP

== Controversies ==
On 15 April 2021, the campaign of Nationals candidate Dave Layzell was found to have registered websites in the names of two other candidates and then released material about those candidates on those domains. Website domains were registered in the names of Shooters, Fishers and Farmers candidate Sue Gilroy and Labor candidate Jeff Drayton. These sites were used to disseminate material unfavourable to these candidates. The Nationals website registered in Gilroy's name highlighted the risk that a vote for the Shooters was a vote for Labor given the potential for the party to allocate preferences to Labor. At the 2019 state election, the Shooters, Fishers and Farmers party urged Upper Hunter voters to put Nationals last, essentially preferencing Labor over Nationals. Deputy Labor leader Yasmin Catley labelled the Nationals campaign a "dirty tricks" campaign, while Gilroy labelled the tactics a "low blow" and "laughable". Layzell denied personal responsibility for registering the websites and the material distributed on those domains.

On 9 May, former Liberal Party Prime Minister Malcolm Turnbull, who owns property in the electorate, endorsed independent candidate Kirsty O'Connell, saying that she would not "sell-out the health of the community in the way the National party has done, in the way they've cuddled up to the big mining companies with no regard to what the people need here." In response, Nationals leader, John Barilaro said that Turnbull is "an absolute disgrace" and should quit the Liberal Party.

== Candidates ==
Candidates are listed in ballot paper order.

Party	Candidate	Background	Notes
Independent	Kirsty O'Connell	Farmer	
Independent	Archie Lea		
Liberal Democrats	Eva Pears	English & HSIE teacher	
One Nation	Dale McNamara		
Nationals	Dave Layzell	Engineer	
Independent	Tracy Norman	Former Dungog Shire mayor and heir to Harvey Norman	
Independent	Steven Reynolds		
Greens	Sue Abbott	Upper Hunter Shire councillor, former lawyer and nurse	
Labor	Jeff Drayton	CFMMEU Mining Division Union vice-president	
Sustainable Australia	Calum Blair		
Animal Justice	Michael Dello-Iacovo		
Shooters, Fishers and Farmers Party	Sue Gilroy	Businesswoman and former nurse in mining industry	
Independent	Kate Fraser		

== Opinion polling ==
Upper Hunter by-election polling
Date	Firm	Commissioned by	Sample	Primary vote						TPP vote
				NAT	ALP	ON	SFF	GRN	OTH	NAT	ALP
21 May 2021	-	National Party	-	34%	20%	16%	12%	-	-
18 May 2021	-	National Party	-	34%	22%	12%	-	-	-
16 May 2021	YouGov	Daily Telegraph	400	25%	23%	11%	16%	6%	19%	51%	49%
17 April 2021	-	Shooters, Fishers and Farmers	~1500	25%	21%	-	18%	-	-
11 April 2021	-	National Party	-	38%	28%	12%	13%	-	9%
9 April 2021	uComms	The Australia Institute	686	35.4%	22.0%	13.0%	7.6%	9.3%	3.7%
2019 New South Wales state election				33.99%	28.65%	-	22.04%	4.78%	10.54%	52.56%	47.44%

== See also ==
- Electoral results for the district of Upper Hunter
- List of New South Wales state by-elections
