= Michael Johnsen =

Australian politician

Member of the New South Wales Parliament for Upper Hunter
- In office 28 March 2015 – 31 March 2021
- Preceded by: George Souris
- Succeeded by: Dave Layzell

Personal details
- Born: Michael John Johnsen; 15 March 1964 (age 62)
- Party: Nationals (until 2021); Independent (from 2021)
- Spouse: Zenda Casey (m. 1985; div. 2015)
- Website: www.michaeljohnsen.com.au

Michael John Johnsen (born 15 March 1964) is an Australian former politician who served in the New South Wales Legislative Assembly as the member for Upper Hunter for the Nationals from 2015 to 2021.

Johnsen served as Mayor for the Upper Hunter Shire Council from 2009 to 2012 and previously contested the seat of Hunter for the Nationals at the 1996, 2010 and 2013 federal elections.

Johnsen was elected to the New South Wales Legislative Assembly in March 2015 "after a traditional Nationals family values election campaign in which his wife featured prominently."

Johnsen announced he was standing aside temporarily on 24 March 2021 due to an ongoing police investigation into a rape allegation against him. He stood aside from his role as parliamentary secretary, and moved to the crossbench and did not sit in the Nationals nor the joint party room. Following further allegations of inappropriate conduct in Parliament House, Johnsen resigned from parliament on 31 March 2021.

== Personal life ==
Michael Johnsen married Zenda Casey in November 1985 and the couple had two children. The marriage ended in late 2015, nine months after Johnsen's election as the member for Upper Hunter.

New South Wales Legislative Assembly
Preceded by George Souris	Member for Upper Hunter; 2015–2021	Succeeded by Dave Layzell
