= Dave Layzell =

Australian politician (born 1975)

Dave Layzell MP

Member of the New South Wales Parliament for Upper Hunter
- Incumbent
- Assumed office 22 May 2021
- Preceded by: Michael Johnsen

Personal details
- Born: David Robert Layzell; 28 August 1975 (age 50) Port Stephens, New South Wales
- Party: NSW Nationals
- Profession: Construction manager
- Website: www.nswnationals.org.au/davelayzell

David Robert Layzell (born 28 August 1975) is an Australian politician who has been in the New South Wales Legislative Assembly as the member for Upper Hunter for the Nationals since May 2021. He is currently the Shadow Minister for Regional Transport and Roads.

Layzell is a former construction manager. He lives in Clarence Town. Dave Layzell was elected to the New South Wales Legislative Assembly at the 2021 Upper Hunter state by-election.

== Personal life ==
Layzell is married to Rachel Layzell, and the couple have four daughters. Layzell was raised in Port Stephens and Nelson Bay by his mother, a nurse, and his father, a civil engineer. He was educated at The Armidale School and attained a building degree from the University of New South Wales, while also being a member of the Kensington–Baxter Colleges.

== Political career ==
Layzell was preselected as the NSW National Party candidate in the Upper Hunter by-election following the resignation of former MP Michael Johnsen over sexual assault allegations. David won the by-election on 22 May with a two-candidate-preferred 3-point swing toward the NSW National Party, despite comments from Premier Gladys Berejiklian that "it would take more than a miracle for us to keep the seat". The by-election also saw 7.46-point and 10-point first-preference swings against the NSW Labor Party and NSW Shooters, Fishers and Farmers respectively.

Layzell was officially sworn in as a member of the 57th Parliament of NSW on 8 June 2021, where he also asked his first question in question time to Deputy Premier Hon. John Barilaro. Layzell gave his first speech in parliament on 9 June 2021.

New South Wales Legislative Assembly
Preceded by Michael Johnsen	Member for Upper Hunter; 2021–present	Incumbent
