= Alison Megarrity =

Australian politician (1961–2022)

1st Assistant Speaker of the Legislative Assembly
- In office 8 May 2007 – 4 March 2011 Serving with Grant McBride
- Speaker: Richard Torbay
- Preceded by: New title
- Succeeded by: Andrew Fraser

Member of the New South Wales Parliament for Menai
- In office 27 March 1999 – 26 March 2011
- Preceded by: New district
- Succeeded by: Melanie Gibbons

Personal details
- Born: 9 February 1961
- Died: 15 November 2022 (aged 61)
- Party: Labor Party
- Spouse: Robert Megarrity
- Children: 2 sons
- Education: Macquarie University

Alison Patricia Megarrity (9 February 1961 – 15 November 2022) was an Australian politician, who served as a member of the New South Wales Legislative Assembly representing Menai for the Labor Party between 1999 and 2011.

Megarrity's father was a railwayman and she grew up in central western New South Wales. She was educated at Our Lady of Mercy College, Parramatta and was awarded a Bachelor of Arts by Macquarie University. She married Robert Megarrity in 1982 and they have two sons. She was a councillor of the City of Liverpool Council between 1994 and 1999.

On 24 September 2010, Megarrity announced her decision to not seek re-election at the 2011 state election, citing personal reasons. In 2013, Megarrity won Labor pre-selection in the Division of Hughes for the 2013 federal election, but was defeated by the sitting member Craig Kelly.

Megarrity died on 15 November 2022, at the age of 61.

== See also ==
- Politics of Australia

== Notes ==
New South Wales Legislative Assembly
New district	Member for Menai; 1999–2011	Succeeded by Melanie Gibbons
New title	Assistant Speaker of the Legislative Assembly; 2007–2011; Served alongside: Grant McBride	Succeeded by Andrew Fraser
