= Tina Ayyad =

Australian politician

Tina Ayyad MP
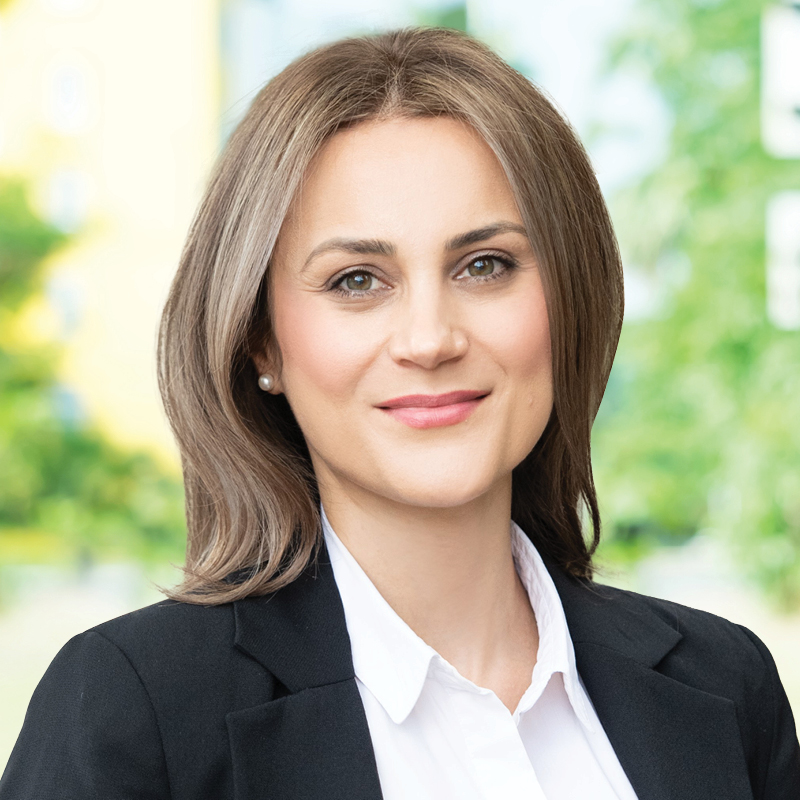

Member of the New South Wales Legislative Assembly
- Incumbent
- Assumed office 25 March 2023
- Constituency: Holsworthy

Personal details
- Party: Liberal
- Occupation: Teacher

Tina Ayyad is an Australian politician. She was elected a member of the New South Wales Legislative Assembly representing Holsworthy for the Liberal party in 2023. Ayyad previously served as a councillor of City of Liverpool.

== Political career ==
During the election campaign for the 2023 New South Wales state election, Ayyad was subject to a racist and islamophobic campaign targeting her Muslim faith. Fake pamphlets made to look like official campaign material were distributed across the electorate of Holsworthy, including the suburb of Barden Ridge. She said "I condemn the racism and hatred that the pamphlets represent and it's something that doesn't belong in our community."

Ayyad defeated incumbent Melanie Gibbons for preselection as the Liberal candidate for Holsworthy. She was elected at the 2023 New South Wales state election, suffering a 5.3-point swing against her.

== Personal life ==
Ayyad is married to City of Liverpool mayor Ned Mannoun and has 3 children. Ayyad is a Muslim.

New South Wales Legislative Assembly
Preceded by Melanie Gibbons	Member for Holsworthy; 2023–date	Incumbent
