= Electoral district of Menai =

Former state electoral district of New South Wales, Australia

Menai New South Wales—Legislative Assembly
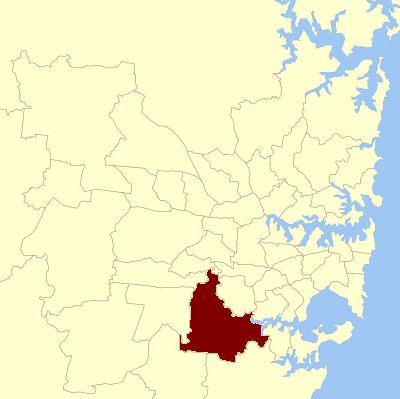
- Location within Sydney.
- State: New South Wales
- Created: 1999
- Abolished: 2015
- Namesake: Menai

Menai was an electoral district of the Legislative Assembly in the Australian state of New South Wales from 1999 to 2015. It was most recently represented by Melanie Gibbons of the Liberal Party. Currently, it is the only state seat in the state of New South Wales to have always been represented by a woman. This district was abolished in the 2013 redistribution, largely replaced by Holsworthy.

== Members for Menai ==
| Member | Party | Term |
|---|---|---|
| Alison Megarrity | Labor | 1999–2011 |
| Melanie Gibbons | Liberal | 2011–2015 |

== Election results ==
2011 New South Wales state election: Menai
| Party | Candidate | Votes | % | ±% |
|---|---|---|---|---|
| Liberal | Melanie Gibbons | 27,593 | 61.0 | +18.4 |
| Labor | Peter Scaysbrook | 8,732 | 19.3 | −26.1 |
| Greens | Simone Morrissey | 3,502 | 7.7 | +3.2 |
| Independent | Jim McGoldrick | 3,040 | 6.7 | +6.7 |
| Christian Democrats | Lindsay Johnson | 2,371 | 5.2 | +5.2 |
| Total formal votes | | 45,238 | 96.8 | −0.7 |
| Informal votes | | 1,479 | 3.2 | +0.7 |
| Turnout | | 46,717 | 94.3 | +0.2 |
Two-party-preferred result
| Liberal | Melanie Gibbons | 29,954 | 74.4 | +27.1 |
| Labor | Peter Scaysbrook | 10,313 | 25.6 | −27.1 |
| Liberal gain from Labor | | Swing | −27.1 | |
