= Melanie Gibbons =

Australian politician

Councillor Melanie Gibbons
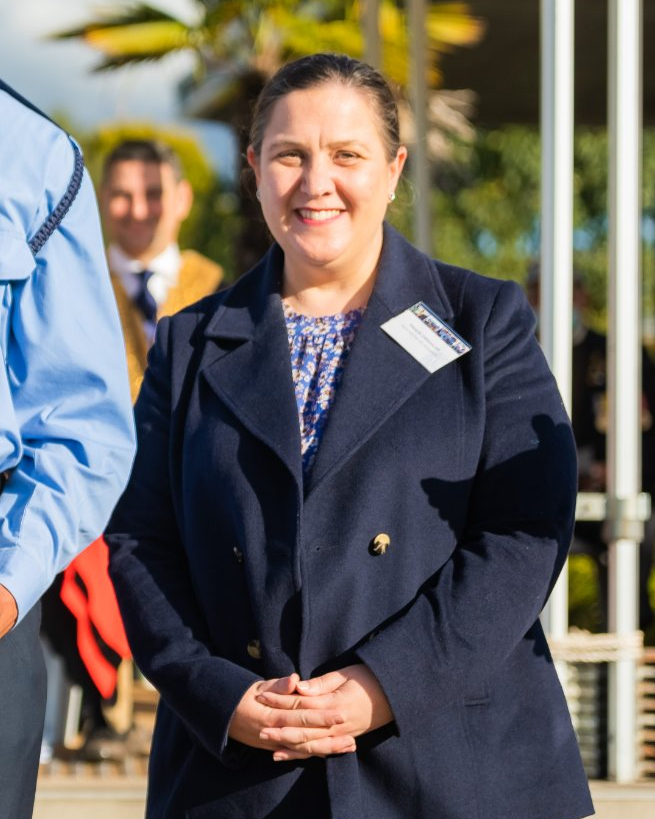

Member of the New South Wales Parliament for Holsworthy
- In office 28 March 2015 – 25 March 2023
- Preceded by: District created
- Succeeded by: Tina Ayyad

Member of the New South Wales Parliament for Menai
- In office 26 March 2011 – 28 March 2015
- Preceded by: Alison Megarrity
- Succeeded by: District abolished

Councillor of the Sutherland Shire
- Incumbent
- Assumed office 2024
- Constituency: B Ward
- In office 2004 – 8 September 2012
- Constituency: E Ward

Personal details
- Born: 18 September 1978 (age 48) Woronora, New South Wales, Australia
- Party: Liberal Party
- Other political affiliations: Independent (Note: Served as an independent while on Sutherland Shire Council.)
- Occupation: Real estate agent

Melanie Rhonda Gibbons (born 18 September 1978) is an Australian politician who was a member of the New South Wales Legislative Assembly representing Menai from 2011 to 2015 and Holsworthy for the Liberal Party from 2015 to 2023.

== Early years and background ==
Gibbons was born and raised in Woronora in the Sutherland Shire and worked as a real estate agent before becoming a development manager for Technical Aid to the Disabled. She also formerly worked for various state and federal politicians.

== Political career ==
Elected to the Sutherland Shire Council in 2004 as a Liberal candidate, Gibbons served as deputy mayor from 2005 to 2006. She sought the Liberal nomination for the seat of Menai, held by Labor's Alison Megarrity, at the 2007 state election. She was defeated by fellow Sutherland Shire Councillor Steve Simpson, who was unsuccessful at the general election. Gibbons was re-elected to Council as an independent in 2008.

=== Menai ===
Gibbons was endorsed as the Liberal Party candidate for Menai in 2010. Megarrity did not seek re-election and Labor endorsed Peter Scaysbrook for the seat. At the March 2011 elections, Gibbons was elected and received a swing of 27.1 points, winning 74.4 per cent of the two-party vote. She won 61 percent of the primary vote, enough to win the seat without the need for preferences. Menai was among the first seats claimed as won by the Coalition on election night; according to Gibbons, it was the very first seat the Coalition took from Labor in its landslide victory. As a result of O'Farrell government changes to electoral requirements, Gibbons was ineligible to seek re-election to Sutherland Shire Council in 2012 due to her status as a member of state Parliament.

In 2012, Gibbons pleaded guilty and was sentenced, without a recorded conviction, for failure to comply with Election Funding Authority regulations regarding the submission of political donation returns for 2010, when she was a Sutherland Shire Councillor.

=== Holsworthy ===
For the 2015 NSW Election, the New South Wales Electoral Commission undertook the process of redistributing electoral boundaries. In this process, Gibbons' seat of Menai was abolished, and replaced with the redrawn seat of Holsworthy, encompassing more of the City of Liverpool than previously. Gibbons won the new seat with a reduced margin of 6.7%, despite a 4% swing to Labor.

When first elected in 2011, Gibbons served as a Temporary Speaker in the Legislative Assembly. After the 2015 election, in addition to her Temporary Speaker position, Gibbons also was appointed the Chair of the Committee for Children and Young People and as the Chair of the Joint Standing Committee on the Office of the Valuer-General.

At the 2019 state election, Gibbons retained the seat of Holsworthy.

On 13 October 2021, Gibbons announced her intention to resign from state parliament in order to stand for the federal seat of Hughes. Gibbons was not selected as the Liberal candidate for Hughes in April 2022 and remained the member for Holsworthy.

Gibbons lost preselection as the Liberal candidate for Holsworthy to Tina Ayyad, 12 to 24.

=== Local Government ===
Gibbons was re-elected to Sutherland Shire Council in September 2024 as the Liberal Party's lead candidate on the B Ward ticket.

== Controversy ==
In June 2018, media reported that Gibbons had "skipped question time" to attend a "local branch meeting".

In April 2019, the Sydney Morning Herald reported that members of Gibbons's staff had edited her Wikipedia page to promote a favourable political image, following her promotion within the Berejiklian ministry.

== See also ==
  - Results of New South Wales state elections
  - 2011 (Menai)
  - 2015 (Holsworthy)
  - 2019 (Holsworthy)
  - 2023 (Kiama)
  - Members of the New South Wales Legislative Assembly
  - 2011–2015
  - 2015–2019
  - 2019–2023
- Women in the New South Wales Legislative Assembly

== Notes ==
New South Wales Legislative Assembly
Preceded by Alison Megarrity	Member for Menai; 2011–2015	District abolished
New district	Member for Holsworthy; 2015–2023	Succeeded by Tina Ayyad
