= Electoral district of Holsworthy =

State electoral district of New South Wales, Australia

Coordinates: 33.98°S 150.953°E

Holsworthy New South Wales—Legislative Assembly
- Interactive map of district boundaries from the 2023 state election
- State: New South Wales
- Created: 2015
- MP: Tina Ayyad
- Party: Liberal Party
- Namesake: Holsworthy, New South Wales
- Electors: 56,367 (2019)
- Area: 130.86 km^{2} (50.5 sq mi)
- Demographic: Outer-metropolitan
Electorates around Holsworthy:
Liverpool	Cabramatta	East Hills
Macquarie Fields; Leppington	Holsworthy	Miranda; Heathcote
Campbelltown	Campbelltown; Heathcote	Heathcote

Holsworthy is an electoral district of the Legislative Assembly and is represented by Tina Ayyad of the Liberal Party since the 2023 New South Wales state election.

== History ==
Holsworthy was created in the 2013 redistribution, largely replacing Menai.

== Geography ==
On its current boundaries, Holsworthy takes in the suburbs of Bangor, Barden Ridge, Casula, Chipping Norton, Cross Roads, Hammondville, Holsworthy, Liverpool, Liverpool Military Area, Lucas Heights, Lurnea, Moorebank, Pleasure Point, Prestons, Sandy Point, Voyager Point and Wattle Grove.

== Members for Holsworthy ==
Member	Party	Period
Melanie Gibbons	Liberal	2015–2023
Tina Ayyad	Liberal	2023–present

== Election results ==
2023 New South Wales state election: Holsworthy
Party	Candidate	Votes	%	±%
Liberal	Tina Ayyad	20,449	41.9	−5.2
Labor	Mick Maroney	19,284	39.5	+4.4
One Nation	James Ingarfill	4,165	8.5	+1.5
Greens	Chris Kerle	2,719	5.6	+0.9
Independent	Deborah Swinbourn	2,174	4.5	+4.5
Total formal votes		48,791	95.7	0.0
Informal votes		2,182	4.3	+0.0
Turnout		50,973	87.8	−1.5
Two-party-preferred result
Liberal	Tina Ayyad	22,359	50.4	−5.6
Labor	Mick Maroney	22,028	49.6	+5.6
Liberal hold		Swing	−5.6	
