= Members of the New South Wales Legislative Assembly, 2011–2015 =

Members of the New South Wales Legislative Assembly who served in the 55th parliament held their seats from 2011 to 2015. They were elected at the 2011 state election and at by-elections. The Speaker was Shelley Hancock.

Name	Party	Electorate	Term in office
Richard Amery	Labor	Mount Druitt	1983–2015
Kevin Anderson	National	Tamworth	2011–present
Graham Annesley (Note: Miranda Liberal MLA Graham Annesley resigned on 28 August 2013. Labor candidate Barry Collier won the resulting by-election on 19 October.)	Liberal	Miranda	2011–2013
Greg Aplin	Liberal	Albury	2003–2019
Stuart Ayres	Liberal	Penrith	2010–2023
Mike Baird	Liberal	Manly	2007–2017
John Barilaro	National	Monaro	2011–2021
Clayton Barr	Labor	Cessnock	2011–present
Bart Bassett (Note: Londonderry MLA Bart Bassett stood aside from the parliamentary Liberal Party on 27 August 2014 after his implication in ICAC proceedings.)	Liberal/Independent	Londonderry	2011–2015
Craig Baumann (Note: Port Stephens MLA Craig Baumann stood aside from the parliamentary Liberal Party on 12 September 2014 after his implication in ICAC proceedings.)	Liberal/Independent	Port Stephens	2007–2015
Gladys Berejiklian	Liberal	Willoughby	2003–2021
Stephen Bromhead	National	Myall Lakes	2011–2023
Glenn Brookes	Liberal	East Hills	2011–2019
Linda Burney	Labor	Canterbury	2003–2016
Cherie Burton	Labor	Kogarah	1999–2015
Steve Cansdell (Note: Clarence Nationals MLA Steve Cansdell resigned on 16 September 2011. Nationals candidate Chris Gulaptis won the resulting by-election on 19 November.)	National	Clarence	2003–2011
Charles Casuscelli	Liberal	Strathfield	2011–2015
Barry Collier	Labor	Miranda	1999–2011, 2013–2015
Kevin Conolly	Liberal	Riverstone	2011–2023
Andrew Constance	Liberal	Bega	2003–2021
Andrew Cornwell (Note: Charlestown MLA Andrew Cornwell and Newcastle MLA Tim Owen stood aside from the parliamentary Liberal Party on 6 August 2014 due to their ongoing involvement in ICAC proceedings. The two MPs sat as independents until they resigned from parliament on 12 August 2014. By-elections were held to replace them on 25 October 2014. Labor candidate Jodie Harrison was elected in the Charlestown by-election. Labor candidate Tim Crakanthorp was elected in the Newcastle by-election.)	Liberal/Independent	Charlestown	2011–2014
Mark Coure	Liberal	Oatley	2011–present
Tim Crakanthorp	Labor	Newcastle	2014–present
Michael Daley	Labor	Maroubra	2005–present
Tanya Davies	Liberal	Mulgoa	2011–present
Victor Dominello	Liberal	Ryde	2008–2023
Bryan Doyle	Liberal	Campbelltown	2011–2015
Garry Edwards (Note: Swansea MLA Garry Edwards stood aside from the parliamentary Liberal Party on 14 August 2014 after his implication in ICAC proceedings.)	Liberal/Independent	Swansea	2011–2015
David Elliott	Liberal	Baulkham Hills	2011–2023
Lee Evans	Liberal	Heathcote	2011–2023
John Flowers	Liberal	Rockdale	2011–2015
Andrew Fraser	National	Coffs Harbour	1990–2019
Robert Furolo	Labor	Lakemba	2008–2015
Andrew Gee	National	Orange	2011–2016
Thomas George	National	Lismore	1999–2019
Melanie Gibbons	Liberal	Menai	2011–2023
Pru Goward	Liberal	Goulburn	2007–2019
Troy Grant	National	Dubbo	2011–2019
Alex Greenwich (Note: Sydney independent MLA Clover Moore resigned on 20 September 2012 as a result of new laws preventing her from being Lord Mayor of Sydney and an MLA simultaneously. Independent candidate Alex Greenwich won the resulting by-election on 27 October.)	Independent	Sydney	2012–present
Chris Gulaptis	National	Clarence	2011–2023
Shelley Hancock	Liberal	South Coast	2003–2023
Jodie Harrison	Labor	Charlestown	2014–present
Chris Hartcher (Note: Terrigal MLA Chris Hartcher, The Entrance MLA Chris Spence and Wyong MLA Darren Webber resigned from the parliamentary Liberal Party in February 2014 following their implication in corruption allegations investigated by the Independent Commission Against Corruption (ICAC). The three MPs sat as independents thereafter.)	Liberal/Independent	Terrigal	1988–2015
Noreen Hay	Labor	Wollongong	2003–2016
Brad Hazzard	Liberal	Wakehurst	1991–2023
Katrina Hodgkinson	National	Burrinjuck	1999–2017
Ron Hoenig (Note: Heffron Labor MLA Kristina Keneally resigned on 29 June 2012. Labor candidate Ron Hoenig won the resulting by-election on 25 August.)	Labor	Heffron	2012–present
Chris Holstein	Liberal	Gosford	2011–2015
Sonia Hornery	Labor	Wallsend	2007–present
Kevin Humphries	National	Barwon	2007–2019
Tony Issa	Liberal	Granville	2011–2015
Matt Kean	Liberal	Hornsby	2011–present
Kristina Keneally	Labor	Heffron	2003–2012
Nick Lalich	Labor	Cabramatta	2008–2023
Geoff Lee	Liberal	Parramatta	2011–2023
Paul Lynch	Labor	Liverpool	1995–2023
Daryl Maguire	Liberal	Wagga Wagga	1999–2018
Andrew McDonald	Labor	Macquarie Fields	2007–2015
Adam Marshall (Note: Independent MLA Richard Torbay resigned on 20 March 2013. Nationals candidate Adam Marshall won the resulting by-election on 25 May.)	National	Northern Tablelands	2013–present
Tania Mihailuk	Labor	Bankstown	2011–2023
Clover Moore	Independent	Sydney	1988–2012
Bruce Notley-Smith	Liberal	Coogee	2011–2019
Jonathan O'Dea	Liberal	Davidson	2007–2023
Barry O'Farrell	Liberal	Ku-ring-gai	1995–2015
Tim Owen	Liberal/Independent	Newcastle	2011–2014
Don Page	National	Ballina	1988–2015
Ryan Park	Labor	Keira	2011–present
Jamie Parker	Greens	Balmain	2011–2023
Robyn Parker	Liberal	Maitland	2011–2015
Chris Patterson	Liberal	Camden	2011–2019
Dominic Perrottet	Liberal	Castle Hill	2011–present
Barbara Perry	Labor	Auburn	2001–2015
Adrian Piccoli	National	Murrumbidgee	1999–2017
Greg Piper	Independent	Lake Macquarie	2007–present
Geoff Provest	National	Tweed	2007–present
Nathan Rees	Labor	Toongabbie	2007–2015
Anthony Roberts	Liberal	Lane Cove	2003–present
John Robertson	Labor	Blacktown	2011–2017
Andrew Rohan	Liberal	Smithfield	2011–2015
Jai Rowell	Liberal	Wollondilly	2011–2018
Roza Sage	Liberal	Blue Mountains	2011–2015
John Sidoti	Liberal	Drummoyne	2011–2023
Jillian Skinner	Liberal	North Shore	1994–2017
Greg Smith	Liberal	Epping	2007–2015
George Souris	National	Upper Hunter	1988–2015
Mark Speakman	Liberal	Cronulla	2011–present
Chris Spence	Liberal/Independent	The Entrance	2011–2015
Rob Stokes	Liberal	Pittwater	2007–2023
Andrew Stoner	National	Oxley	1999–2015
Carmel Tebbutt	Labor	Marrickville	2005–2015
Paul Toole	National	Bathurst	2011–present
Richard Torbay	Independent	Northern Tablelands	1999–2013
Gabrielle Upton	Liberal	Vaucluse	2011–2023
Gareth Ward	Liberal	Kiama	2011–present
Anna Watson	Labor	Shellharbour	2011–present
Darren Webber	Liberal/Independent	Wyong	2011–2015
John Williams	National	Murray-Darling	2007–2015
Leslie Williams	National	Port Macquarie	2011–2025
Ray Williams	Liberal	Hawkesbury	2007–present
Guy Zangari	Labor	Fairfield	2011–present

== See also ==
- O'Farrell ministry
- First Baird ministry
- Results of the 2011 New South Wales state election (Legislative Assembly)
- Candidates of the 2011 New South Wales state election
