= Electoral results for the district of Charlestown =

Electora district of the legislative assembly in New South Wales, Australia

Charlestown, an electoral district of the Legislative Assembly in the Australian state of New South Wales, was established in 1971, replacing parts of the abolished districts of Hamilton and Kahibah.

Election	Member	Party
1971	Jack Stewart	Labor
1972 by	Richard Face	Labor
1976	Richard Face	Labor
1978	Richard Face	Labor
1981	Richard Face	Labor
1984	Richard Face	Labor
1988	Richard Face	Labor
1991	Richard Face	Labor
1995	Richard Face	Labor
1999	Richard Face	Labor
2003	Matthew Morris	Labor
2007	Matthew Morris	Labor
2011	Andrew Cornwell	Liberal
2014 by	Jodie Harrison	Labor
2015	Jodie Harrison	Labor
2019	Jodie Harrison	Labor
2023	Jodie Harrison	Labor

== Election results ==
=== Elections in the 2020s ===
==== 2023 ====
2023 New South Wales state election: Charlestown
Party	Candidate	Votes	%	±%
Labor	Jodie Harrison	30,432	57.4	+7.7
Liberal	Jack Antcliff	13,178	24.9	−6.7
Greens	Greg Watkinson	6,778	12.8	+1.6
Sustainable Australia	Marie Rolfe	2,593	4.9	+4.9
Total formal votes		52,981	97.0	+0.6
Informal votes		1,632	3.0	−0.6
Turnout		54,613	89.6	−2.4
Two-party-preferred result
Labor	Jodie Harrison	35,300	71.1	+8.0
Liberal	Jack Antcliff	14,358	28.9	−8.0
Labor hold		Swing	+8.0	

=== Elections in the 2010s ===
==== 2019 ====
2019 New South Wales state election: Charlestown
Party	Candidate	Votes	%	±%
Labor	Jodie Harrison	24,590	50.31	+2.11
Liberal	Jennifer Barrie	16,220	33.19	+2.89
Greens	Therese Doyle	5,539	11.33	+0.34
Animal Justice	Richard Turner	2,525	5.17	+5.17
Total formal votes		48,874	96.47	+0.40
Informal votes		1,787	3.53	−0.40
Turnout		50,661	90.92	−2.03
Two-party-preferred result
Labor	Jodie Harrison	28,270	62.35	−0.55
Liberal	Jennifer Barrie	17,069	37.65	+0.55
Labor hold		Swing	−0.55	

==== 2015 ====
2015 New South Wales state election: Charlestown
Party	Candidate	Votes	%	±%
Labor	Jodie Harrison	23,584	48.2	+19.2
Liberal	Jason Pauling	14,821	30.3	−12.7
Greens	Jane Oakley	5,378	11.0	+1.9
Independent	Luke Arms	2,830	5.8	+5.8
Christian Democrats	Brian Tucker	1,054	2.2	−0.0
Independent	Arjay Martin	712	1.5	+1.5
No Land Tax	Tania Morvillo	544	1.1	+1.1
Total formal votes		48,923	96.1	−0.0
Informal votes		2,001	3.9	+0.0
Turnout		50,924	92.9	+0.4
Two-party-preferred result
Labor	Jodie Harrison	26,976	62.9	+22.1
Liberal	Jason Pauling	15,912	37.1	−22.1
Labor hold		Swing	+22.1	

==== 2014 by-election ====
2014 Charlestown by-election Saturday 25 October
Party	Candidate	Votes	%	±%
Labor	Jodie Harrison	19,429	49.3	+20.4
Greens	Jane Oakley	5,613	14.2	+5.8
Independent	Luke Arms	4,807	12.2	+12.2
Palmer United	Suellen Wrightson	2,592	6.6	+6.6
Independent	Veronica Hope	2,144	5.4	+5.4
Christian Democrats	Brian Tucker	1,804	4.6	+2.4
Independent	Luke Cubis	1,366	3.5	+3.5
Independent	Marc Sky	1,068	2.7	+2.7
Independent	Arjay Martin	611	1.5	+1.5
Total formal votes		39,434	92.6	−3.9
Informal votes		3,158	7.4	+3.9
Turnout		42,592	85.4	−9.1
Two-candidate-preferred result
Labor	Jodie Harrison	21,206	70.8	+30.6
Greens	Jane Oakley	8,762	29.2	+29.2
Labor gain from Liberal		Swing	N/A	

Andrew Cornwell (Liberal / Independent) resigned.

==== 2011 ====
2011 New South Wales state election: Charlestown
Party	Candidate	Votes	%	±%
Liberal	Andrew Cornwell	19,085	43.8	+25.2
Labor	Matthew Morris	12,590	28.9	−14.6
Greens	Paula Morrow	3,672	8.4	−1.8
Independent	Barry Johnston	3,217	7.4	+7.4
Fishing Party	Craig Oaten	1,869	4.3	+4.3
Christian Democrats	Steve Camilleri	949	2.2	−1.0
Family First	Bruce Foley	943	2.2	+2.2
Independent	Ben McMullen	539	1.2	+1.2
Independent	Adrian Schofield	460	1.1	+1.1
Independent	Ajay Martin	228	0.5	+0.5
Total formal votes		43,552	96.5	−0.7
Informal votes		1,575	3.5	+0.7
Turnout		45,127	94.4	+0.2
Two-party-preferred result
Liberal	Andrew Cornwell	21,856	59.9	+59.9
Labor	Matthew Morris	14,661	40.1	−16.9
Liberal gain from Labor		Swing	N/A	

=== Elections in the 2000s ===
==== 2007 ====
2007 New South Wales state election: Charlestown
Party	Candidate	Votes	%	±%
Labor	Matthew Morris	18,633	43.5	−6.3
Independent	Paul Scarfe	10,531	24.6	+24.6
Liberal	Lindsay Paterson	7,988	18.6	−10.2
Greens	Jane Smith	4,378	10.2	+1.7
Christian Democrats	Jim Kendall	1,342	3.1	+0.9
Total formal votes		42,872	97.2	−0.1
Informal votes		1,228	2.8	+0.1
Turnout		44,100	94.2	
Notional two-party-preferred count
Labor	Matthew Morris	22,404	64.6	+1.3
Liberal	Lindsay Paterson	12,280	35.4	−1.3
Two-candidate-preferred result
Labor	Matthew Morris	21,139	57.0	−6.3
Independent	Paul Scarfe	15,924	43.0	+43.0
Labor hold		Swing	N/A	

==== 2003 ====
2003 New South Wales state election: Charlestown
Party	Candidate	Votes	%	±%
Labor	Matthew Morris	20,426	50.5	−4.2
Liberal	Fiona Glen	11,025	27.2	+4.9
Greens	Keith Parsons	3,545	8.8	+2.4
Independent	Peter Nikoletatos	1,576	3.9	+3.9
Independent	Kate Ferguson	1,400	3.5	+3.5
Christian Democrats	Jennifer Boswell	1,041	2.6	−0.3
One Nation	John Phillips	699	1.7	−8.5
AAFI	James Bateman	516	1.3	+1.3
Socialist Alliance	Kathy Newnam	256	0.6	+0.6
Total formal votes		40,484	97.2	−0.7
Informal votes		1,157	2.8	+0.7
Turnout		41,641	93.8	
Two-party-preferred result
Labor	Matthew Morris	22,410	64.7	−4.6
Liberal	Fiona Glen	12,235	35.3	+4.6
Labor hold		Swing	−4.6	

=== Elections in the 1990s ===
==== 1999 ====
1999 New South Wales state election: Charlestown
Party	Candidate	Votes	%	±%
Labor	Richard Face	22,300	54.7	−1.9
Liberal	Peter Craig	9,078	22.3	−5.0
One Nation	Malcolm Sinclair	4,157	10.2	+10.2
Greens	Lynden Jacobi	2,612	6.4	+5.8
Independent	James Hunt	1,409	3.5	+3.5
Christian Democrats	Jenny Boswell	1,190	2.9	+0.4
Total formal votes		40,746	97.9	+3.2
Informal votes		878	2.1	−3.2
Turnout		41,624	95.3	
Two-party-preferred result
Labor	Richard Face	24,802	69.3	+5.5
Liberal	Peter Craig	10,977	30.7	−5.5
Labor hold		Swing	+5.5	

==== 1995 ====
1995 New South Wales state election: Charlestown
Party	Candidate	Votes	%	±%
Labor	Richard Face	18,186	55.9	+1.4
Liberal	Trevor Bates	8,134	25.0	−4.3
Independent	Ivan Welsh	3,939	12.1	+12.1
Independent	Richard Hill	1,279	3.9	+3.9
Call to Australia	Jim Kendall	1,012	3.1	+0.9
Total formal votes		32,550	95.1	+2.9
Informal votes		1,660	4.9	−2.9
Turnout		34,210	94.0	
Two-party-preferred result
Labor	Richard Face	19,282	64.2	+1.1
Liberal	Trevor Bates	10,741	35.8	−1.1
Labor hold		Swing	+1.1	

==== 1991 ====
1991 New South Wales state election: Charlestown
Party	Candidate	Votes	%	±%
Labor	Richard Face	17,465	54.5	+8.5
Liberal	Judith Lloyd	9,399	29.3	−4.7
Independent	Steve Owens	2,574	8.0	+8.0
Democrats	Graham Pritchard	1,892	5.9	+5.6
Call to Australia	Robin Budge	714	2.2	+2.2
Total formal votes		32,044	92.2	−4.7
Informal votes		2,711	7.8	+4.7
Turnout		34,755	95.9	
Two-party-preferred result
Labor	Richard Face	19,301	63.1	+10.7
Liberal	Judith Lloyd	11,268	36.9	−10.7
Labor hold		Swing	+10.7	

=== Elections in the 1980s ===
==== 1988 ====
1988 New South Wales state election: Charlestown
Party	Candidate	Votes	%	±%
Labor	Richard Face	13,013	43.7	−15.4
Liberal	Judith Lloyd	10,374	34.8	−3.5
Independent	Brian Carling	6,420	21.5	+21.5
Total formal votes		29,807	97.4	−0.5
Informal votes		807	2.6	+0.5
Turnout		30,614	95.8	
Two-party-preferred result
Labor	Richard Face	14,571	50.1	−10.5
Liberal	Judith Lloyd	14,508	49.9	+10.5
Labor hold		Swing	−10.5	

==== 1984 ====
1984 New South Wales state election: Charlestown
Party	Candidate	Votes	%	±%
Labor	Richard Face	19,014	59.0	−9.3
Liberal	Peter Wilson	13,211	41.0	+9.3
Total formal votes		32,225	98.0	+0.6
Informal votes		655	2.0	−0.6
Turnout		32,880	95.6	+2.4
Labor hold		Swing	−9.3	

==== 1981 ====
1981 New South Wales state election: Charlestown
Party	Candidate	Votes	%	±%
Labor	Richard Face	21,223	68.3	+0.9
Liberal	Robert Cowley	9,853	31.7	−0.9
Total formal votes		31,076	97.4	
Informal votes		840	2.6	
Turnout		31,916	93.2	
Labor hold		Swing	+0.9	

=== Elections in the 1970s ===
==== 1978 ====
1978 New South Wales state election: Charlestown
Party	Candidate	Votes	%	±%
Labor	Richard Face	22,379	67.4	+5.7
Liberal	Richard Bevan	10,821	32.6	−5.7
Total formal votes		33,200	98.1	−0.5
Informal votes		628	1.9	+0.5
Turnout		33,828	95.0	−0.3
Labor hold		Swing	+5.7	

==== 1976 ====
1976 New South Wales state election: Charlestown
Party	Candidate	Votes	%	±%
Labor	Richard Face	20,019	61.7	+7.8
Liberal	Thomas Ford	12,455	38.3	+1.6
Total formal votes		32,474	98.6	+0.6
Informal votes		472	1.4	−0.6
Turnout		32,946	95.3	−0.7
Labor hold		Swing	+3.2	

==== 1973 ====
1973 New South Wales state election: Charlestown
Party	Candidate	Votes	%	±%
Labor	Richard Face	16,543	53.9	−0.8
Liberal	Paul Clarkson	11,272	36.7	+0.3
Australia	John Steele	1,813	5.9	+2.2
Democratic Labor	Ignatius Philippa	1,062	3.5	−1.7
Total formal votes		30,690	98.0	
Informal votes		626	2.0	
Turnout		31,316	96.0	
Two-party-preferred result
Labor	Richard Face	17,910	58.4	+0.1
Liberal	Paul Clarkson	12,780	41.6	−0.1
Labor hold		Swing	+0.1	

==== 1972 by-election ====
1972 Charlestown by-election Saturday 18 November
Party	Candidate	Votes	%	±%
Labor	Richard Face	15,977	59.9	+5.2
Liberal	Wallace MacDonald	9,474	35.5	−0.9
Independent	Colin Fisher	1,217	4.6	
Total formal votes		26,668	98.4	−0.1
Informal votes		446	1.6	+0.13
Turnout		27,114	88.6	−6.0
Labor hold		Swing	+5.2	

Jack Stewart (Labor) died.

==== 1971 ====
1971 New South Wales state election: Charlestown
Party	Candidate	Votes	%	±%
Labor	Jack Stewart	15,043	54.7	−4.3
Liberal	Alfred Pickering	10,027	36.4	−4.6
Democratic Labor	Hugh Ansell	1,438	5.2	+5.2
Australia	Charles Hockings	1,011	3.7	+3.7
Total formal votes		27,519	98.5	
Informal votes		422	1.5	
Turnout		27,941	94.7	
Two-party-preferred result
Labor	Jack Stewart	16,039	58.3	−0.7
Liberal	Alfred Pickering	11,480	41.7	+0.7
Labor notional hold		Swing	−0.7	
