= Post-election pendulum for the 2011 New South Wales state election =

This article provides the Mackerras pendulum following the 2011 New South Wales state election:

For the pendulum immediately before the 2015 election, see Pre-election pendulum for the New South Wales state election, 2015.

== Legislative Assembly ==
=== Pendulum ===
The current New South Wales pendulum:

Liberal/National seats
Marginal
Oatley	Mark Coure	LIB	0.5%
East Hills	Glenn Brookes	LIB	0.6%
Swansea	Garry Edwards	LIB	1.1%
Monaro	John Barilaro	NAT	2.1%
Newcastle	Tim Owen	LIB	2.6%
Wyong	Darren Webber	LIB	2.6%
Granville	Tony Issa	LIB	2.7%
Campbelltown	Bryan Doyle	LIB	3.4%
Rockdale	John Flowers	LIB	3.6%
Strathfield	Charles Casuscelli	LIB	4.4%
Blue Mountains	Roza Sage	LIB	4.7%
Smithfield	Andrew Rohan	LIB	4.8%
Fairly safe
Maitland	Robyn Parker	LIB	6.3%
Port Macquarie	Leslie Williams	NAT v IND	6.5%
Kiama	Gareth Ward	LIB	7.5%
Tamworth	Kevin Anderson	NAT v IND	7.8%
Coogee	Bruce Notley-Smith	LIB	8.3%
Charlestown	Andrew Cornwell	LIB	9.9%
Safe
Wagga Wagga	Daryl Maguire	LIB v IND	10.3%
Gosford	Chris Holstein	LIB	11.9%
Mulgoa	Tanya Davies	LIB	12.0%
Hornsby	Matt Kean	LIB v IND	12.1%
Parramatta	Geoff Lee	LIB	12.1%
Londonderry	Bart Bassett	LIB	12.3%
Port Stephens	Craig Baumann	LIB	12.5%
The Entrance	Chris Spence	LIB	12.5%
Heathcote	Lee Evans	LIB	12.9%
Dubbo	Troy Grant	NAT v IND	13.7%
Wollondilly	Jai Rowell	LIB	14.7%
Penrith	Stuart Ayres	LIB	16.3%
Drummoyne	John Sidoti	LIB	16.7%
Ballina	Don Page	NAT v GRN	17.8%
Upper Hunter	George Souris	NAT v IND	18.3%
Bega	Andrew Constance	LIB	18.6%
Camden	Chris Patterson	LIB	18.9%
Very safe
Riverstone	Kevin Conolly	LIB	20.2%
Lismore	Thomas George	NAT v GRN	20.2%
South Coast	Shelley Hancock	LIB	20.4%
Miranda	Graham Annesley	LIB	21.0%
Tweed	Geoff Provest	NAT	21.7%
Orange	Andrew Gee	NAT v IND	21.9%
Clarence	Steve Cansdell	NAT v IND	23.3%
Bathurst	Paul Toole	NAT	23.7%
Terrigal	Chris Hartcher	LIB	24.2%
Menai	Melanie Gibbons	LIB	24.4%
Myall Lakes	Stephen Bromhead	NAT v IND	24.9%
Epping	Greg Smith	LIB	25.2%
Cronulla	Mark Speakman	LIB	25.6%
Lane Cove	Anthony Roberts	LIB v GRN	25.7%
Ryde	Victor Dominello	LIB	25.7%
Vaucluse	Gabrielle Upton	LIB v GRN	26.1%
Baulkham Hills	David Elliott	LIB	26.4%
Goulburn	Pru Goward	LIB	26.6%
Albury	Greg Aplin	LIB	26.9%
Manly	Mike Baird	LIB v GRN	27.0%
Coffs Harbour	Andrew Fraser	NAT	27.2%
Murray-Darling	John Williams	NAT	27.2%
Murrumbidgee	Adrian Piccoli	NAT	27.9%
Pittwater	Rob Stokes	LIB v GRN	28.0%
Willoughby	Gladys Berejiklian	LIB v GRN	28.1%
Wakehurst	Brad Hazzard	LIB v GRN	28.5%
Oxley	Andrew Stoner	NAT v GRN	28.8%
North Shore	Jillian Skinner	LIB v GRN	30.3%
Castle Hill	Dominic Perrottet	LIB	30.8%
Burrinjuck	Katrina Hodgkinson	NAT	31.1%
Ku-ring-gai	Barry O'Farrell	LIB v GRN	31.3%
Barwon	Kevin Humphries	NAT	32.0%
Davidson	Jonathan O'Dea	LIB v GRN	33.4%
Hawkesbury	Ray Williams	LIB	34.7%

Labor seats
Marginal
Toongabbie	Nathan Rees	ALP	0.3%
Marrickville	Carmel Tebbutt	ALP v GRN	0.9%
Wollongong	Noreen Hay	ALP v IND	1.0%
Macquarie Fields	Andrew McDonald	ALP	1.5%
Maroubra	Michael Daley	ALP	1.6%
Fairfield	Guy Zangari	ALP	1.7%
Kogarah	Cherie Burton	ALP	1.9%
Cabramatta	Nick Lalich	ALP	2.1%
Blacktown	John Robertson	ALP	3.7%
Keira	Ryan Park	ALP	3.9%
Cessnock	Clayton Barr	ALP	4.4%
Fairly safe
Wallsend	Sonia Hornery	ALP	6.6%
Mount Druitt	Richard Amery	ALP	6.7%
Lakemba	Robert Furolo	ALP	7.0%
Heffron	Kristina Keneally	ALP	7.1%
Canterbury	Linda Burney	ALP	8.3%
Auburn	Barbara Perry	ALP	8.5%
Shellharbour	Anna Watson	ALP	8.6%
Safe
Bankstown	Tania Mihailuk	ALP	10.3%
Liverpool	Paul Lynch	ALP	14.7%
Independent & other seats
Sydney	Clover Moore	IND v LIB	3.1%
Balmain	Jamie Parker	GRN v LIB	3.5%
Lake Macquarie	Greg Piper	IND v LIB	14.9%
Northern Tablelands	Richard Torbay	IND v NAT	19.4%

== Legislative Council ==
=== Current balance ===
Party	Seats held		Current 42-seat Council
Party	2011	Now	Current 42-seat Council
Labor Party	14	14	
Liberal Party	12	12	
National Party	7	7	
The Greens	5	5	
Shooters and Fishers Party	2	2	
Christian Democratic Party	2	2	
