= Pre-election pendulum for the 2015 New South Wales state election =

The Mackerras pendulum for the 2015 New South Wales state election.

== Legislative Assembly ==
=== Pendulum ===
Liberal/National seats
Marginal
East Hills	Glenn Brookes	LIB	0.2 points
Swansea	Garry Edwards	LIB	0.3 points
Prospect	Andrew Rohan	LIB	1.1 points
Macquarie Fields	Andrew McDonald (ALP)^{8}	LIB	1.8 points
Monaro	John Barilaro	NAT	2.0 points
Rockdale	John Flowers	LIB	3.6 points
Granville	Tony Issa	LIB	3.8 points
Oatley	Mark Coure	LIB	3.8 points
Wyong	Darren Webber^{6}	LIB	4.6 points
Maitland	Robyn Parker	LIB	4.9 points
Londonderry	Bart Bassett	LIB	5.3 points
Blue Mountains	Roza Sage	LIB	5.4 points
Fairly safe
Strathfield	Charles Casuscelli	LIB	6.4 points
Campbelltown	Bryan Doyle	LIB	6.8 points
Tamworth	Kevin Anderson	NAT v IND	6.8 points
Coogee	Bruce Notley-Smith	LIB	8.3 points
Kiama	Gareth Ward	LIB	8.6 points
Seven Hills	Nathan Rees (ALP)^{8}	LIB	8.8 points
Safe
Holsworthy	Melanie Gibbons	LIB	10.7 points
The Entrance	Chris Spence^{6}	LIB	11.5 points
Gosford	Chris Holstein	LIB	11.9 points
Mulgoa	Tanya Davies	LIB	12.4 points
Parramatta	Geoff Lee	LIB	12.5 points
Port Stephens	Craig Baumann	LIB	14.7 points
Clarence	Chris Gulaptis^{1}	NAT	15.1 points
Penrith	Stuart Ayres	LIB	16.1 points
Drummoyne	John Sidoti	LIB	17.1 points
Ballina	Don Page	NAT v GRN	17.8 points
Upper Hunter	George Souris	NAT v IND	18.3 points
Bega	Andrew Constance	LIB	18.5 points
Heathcote	Lee Evans	LIB	19.0 points
Very safe
Riverstone	Kevin Conolly	LIB	20.2 points
Lismore	Thomas George	NAT v GRN	20.2 points
South Coast	Shelley Hancock	LIB	20.4 points
Wollondilly	Jai Rowell	LIB	21.6 points
Tweed	Geoff Provest	NAT	21.7 points
Orange	Andrew Gee	NAT v IND	21.9 points
Camden	Chris Patterson	LIB	22.8 points
North Shore	Jillian Skinner	LIB v GRN	23.2 points
Bathurst	Paul Toole	NAT	23.7 points
Terrigal	Chris Hartcher^{6}	LIB	24.2 points
Myall Lakes	Stephen Bromhead	NAT v IND	24.9 points
Epping	Greg Smith	LIB	25.2 points
Cronulla	Mark Speakman	LIB	25.6 points
Lane Cove	Anthony Roberts	LIB v GRN	25.7 points
Ryde	Victor Dominello	LIB	25.7 points
Vaucluse	Gabrielle Upton	LIB v GRN	26.1 points
Baulkham Hills	David Elliott	LIB	26.4 points
Hornsby	Matt Kean	LIB	26.5 points
Goulburn	Pru Goward	LIB	26.6 points
Albury	Greg Aplin	LIB	26.9 points
Manly	Mike Baird	LIB v GRN	27.0 points
Coffs Harbour	Andrew Fraser	NAT	27.2 points
Murray-Darling	John Williams	NAT	27.2 points
Wagga Wagga	Daryl Maguire	LIB	27.8 points
Pittwater	Rob Stokes	LIB v GRN	28.0 points
Willoughby	Gladys Berejiklian	LIB v GRN	28.1 points
Wakehurst	Brad Hazzard	LIB v GRN	28.5 points
Port Macquarie	Leslie Williams	NAT	28.8 points
Oxley	Andrew Stoner	NAT v GRN	28.8 points
Cootamundra	Katrina Hodgkinson	NAT	30.3 points
Castle Hill	Dominic Perrottet	LIB	30.8 points
Northern Tablelands	Adam Marshall^{4}	NAT	31.0 points
Dubbo	Troy Grant	NAT	31.3 points
Ku-ring-gai	Barry O'Farrell	LIB v GRN	31.3 points
Barwon	Kevin Humphries	NAT	32.0 points
Davidson	Jonathan O'Dea	LIB v GRN	33.4 points
Hawkesbury	Ray Williams	LIB	34.7 points

Labor seats
Marginal
Marrickville	Carmel Tebbutt	ALP v GRN	0.9 points
Wollongong	Noreen Hay	ALP v IND	1.0 points
Maroubra	Michael Daley	ALP	1.6 points
Fairfield	Guy Zangari	ALP	1.7 points
Kogarah	Cherie Burton	ALP	1.9 points
Cabramatta	Nick Lalich	ALP	2.1 points
Blacktown	John Robertson	ALP	3.7 points
Keira	Ryan Park	ALP	3.9 points
Cessnock	Clayton Barr	ALP	4.4 points
Miranda	Barry Collier^{5}	ALP	5.2 points
Fairly safe
Wallsend	Sonia Hornery	ALP	6.6 points
Mount Druitt	Richard Amery	ALP	6.7 points
Lakemba	Robert Furolo	ALP	7.0 points
Canterbury	Linda Burney	ALP	8.3 points
Auburn	Barbara Perry	ALP	8.5 points
Shellharbour	Anna Watson	ALP	8.6 points
Newcastle	Tim Crakanthorp	ALP	8.7 points
Safe
Bankstown	Tania Mihailuk	ALP	10.3 points
Liverpool	Paul Lynch	ALP	14.7 points
Heffron	Ron Hoenig^{2}	ALP v GRN	20.0 points
Charlestown	Jodie Harrison^{7}	ALP v GRN	20.6 points
Safe
Independent & other seats
Balmain	Jamie Parker	GRN v LIB	3.5 points
Newtown	Newly created electorate	GRN v ALP	4.4 points
Sydney	Alex Greenwich^{3}	IND v LIB	13.7 points
Lake Macquarie	Greg Piper	IND v LIB	14.9 points

1. Member for Clarence, Steve Cansdell, resigned on 16 September 2011. He was succeeded by Chris Gulaptis at the 2011 Clarence state by-election.
2. Member for Heffron, Kristina Keneally, resigned on 29 June 2012. She was succeeded by Ron Hoenig at the 2012 Heffron state by-election.
3. Member for Sydney, Clover Moore, was forced to resign on 20 September 2012. She was succeeded by Alex Greenwich at the 2012 Sydney state by-election.
4. Member for Northern Tablelands, Richard Torbay, resigned on 20 March 2013. He was succeeded by Adam Marshall at the 2013 Northern Tablelands state by-election.
5. Member for Miranda, Graham Annesley, resigned on 28 August 2013. He was succeeded by Barry Collier at the 2013 Miranda state by-election.
6. Member for Wyong, Darren Webber, Member for The Entrance, Chris Spence and Member for Terrigal, Chris Hartcher were suspended for the Liberal Party due to investigations undertaken by the ICAC
7. Member for Charlestown, Andrew Cornwell, resigned with immediate effect in August 2014. He was succeeded by Jodie Harrison at the 2014 Charlestown state by-election.
8. As a result of a redistribution, the ALP-held seat of Macquarie Fields becomes notionally Liberal. ALP-held Toongabbie is replaced by the notionally Liberal electorate of Seven Hills.

== Legislative Council ==
=== Current balance ===
Party	Seats held		Current 42-seat Council
Party	2011	Now	Current 42-seat Council
Labor Party	14	14	
Liberal Party	12	10	
National Party	7	7	
The Greens	5	5	
Shooters and Fishers Party	2	2	
Christian Democratic Party	2	2	
Independents	0	2	
