= Results of the 2011 New South Wales Legislative Assembly election =

State election for New South Wales, Australia in March 2011

This is a list of electoral district results for the 2011 New South Wales state election.

== Results by electoral district ==
=== Albury ===
2011 New South Wales state election: Albury
Party	Candidate	Votes	%	±%
Liberal	Greg Aplin	26,316	61.1	−4.2
Labor	Darren Cameron	6,566	15.2	−12.1
Independent	Paul Wareham	6,276	14.6	+14.6
Greens	Colin Hesse	2,188	5.1	−2.2
Christian Democrats	Rhonda Avasalu	1,101	2.6	+2.6
Democrats	Stephen Bingle	617	1.4	+1.4
Total formal votes		43,064	96.3	−1.1
Informal votes		1,667	3.7	+1.1
Turnout		44,731	90.0	−0.4
Two-party-preferred result
Liberal	Greg Aplin	28,606	76.9	+7.9
Labor	Darren Cameron	8,609	23.1	−7.9
Liberal hold		Swing	+7.9	

=== Auburn ===
2011 New South Wales state election: Auburn
Party	Candidate	Votes	%	±%
Labor	Barbara Perry	20,377	46.3	−14.0
Liberal	Ned Attie	14,159	32.2	+17.8
Greens	Michael Kiddle	2,969	6.7	+2.7
Independent	Salim Mehajer	2,964	6.7	+6.7
Christian Democrats	Raema Walker	2,323	5.3	+1.4
Social Justice Network	Jamal Daoud	759	1.7	+1.7
Socialist Equality	Carolyn Kennett	477	1.1	+1.1
Total formal votes		44,028	95.0	−0.8
Informal votes		2,318	5.0	+0.8
Turnout		46,346	90.9	−1.0
Two-party-preferred result
Labor	Barbara Perry	22,199	58.5	−20.3
Liberal	Ned Attie	15,758	41.5	+20.3
Labor hold		Swing	−20.3	

=== Ballina ===
2011 New South Wales state election: Ballina
Party	Candidate	Votes	%	±%
National	Don Page	24,054	57.0	+2.6
Greens	Simon Richardson	9,159	21.7	+2.3
Labor	Toby Warnes	5,033	11.9	−11.2
Independent	Karin Kolbe	2,296	5.4	+5.4
Christian Democrats	Bruce Kemp	847	2.0	+2.0
Family First	Nathan Willis	835	2.0	+2.0
Total formal votes		42,224	97.9	−0.6
Informal votes		886	2.1	+0.6
Turnout		43,110	89.0	−0.9
Notional two-party-preferred count
National	Don Page	26,672	75.2	+10.7
Labor	Toby Warnes	8,814	24.8	−10.7
Two-candidate-preferred result
National	Don Page	25,816	67.8	+3.3
Greens	Simon Richardson	12,268	32.2	+32.2
National hold		Swing	+3.3	

=== Balmain ===
2011 New South Wales state election: Balmain
Party	Candidate	Votes	%	±%
Liberal	James Falk	14,860	32.6	+8.8
Greens	Jamie Parker	14,019	30.7	+1.2
Labor	Verity Firth	13,765	30.2	−9.1
Independent	Maire Sheehan	1,375	3.0	+3.0
Independent	Jane Ward	681	1.5	−1.6
Christian Democrats	Leeanne Gesling	426	0.9	+0.9
Independent Protectionist	Nicholas Folkes	289	0.6	+0.6
Independent	Jon Shapiro	223	0.5	+0.5
Total formal votes		45,638	97.5	+0.1
Informal votes		1,149	2.5	−0.1
Turnout		46,787	90.2	+0.4
Notional two-party-preferred count
Labor	Verity Firth	19,392	53.5	−14.3
Liberal	James Falk	16,850	46.5	+14.3
Two-candidate-preferred result
Greens	Jamie Parker	19,141	53.5	+7.2
Liberal	James Falk	16,664	46.5	+46.5
Greens gain from Labor		Swing	+7.2	

=== Bankstown ===
2011 New South Wales state election: Bankstown
Party	Candidate	Votes	%	±%
Labor	Tania Mihailuk	19,327	46.3	−17.9
Liberal	Bill Chahine	12,457	29.9	+9.9
Independent	Edmond Taouk	2,955	7.1	+7.1
Independent	Rebecca Kay	2,709	6.5	+6.5
Christian Democrats	Zarif Abdulla	1,779	4.3	−0.5
Greens	Malikeh Michels	1,668	4.0	−1.4
Socialist Equality	Richard Phillips	818	2.0	+2.0
Total formal votes		41,713	93.6	−1.3
Informal votes		2,851	6.4	+1.3
Turnout		44,564	91.5	−1.2
Two-party-preferred result
Labor	Tania Mihailuk	21,011	60.3	−15.2
Liberal	Bill Chahine	13,862	39.7	+15.2
Labor hold		Swing	−15.2	

=== Barwon ===
2011 New South Wales state election: Barwon
Party	Candidate	Votes	%	±%
National	Kevin Humphries	30,949	79.1	+34.8
Labor	Patrick Massarani	6,276	16.0	−3.4
Greens	Ian George	1,882	4.8	+1.8
Total formal votes		39,107	97.8	0.0
Informal votes		876	2.2	0.0
Turnout		39,983	91.3	+0.2
Two-party-preferred result
National	Kevin Humphries	31,349	82.0	+26.0
Labor	Patrick Massarani	6,883	18.0	+18.0
National hold		Swing	+26.0	

=== Bathurst ===
2011 New South Wales state election: Bathurst
Party	Candidate	Votes	%	±%
National	Paul Toole	30,777	67.2	+36.4
Labor	Dale Turner	9,607	21.0	−32.5
Greens	Diane Westerhuis	2,843	6.2	+1.4
Independent	Richard Trounson	2,596	5.7	+5.7
Total formal votes		45,823	97.9	−0.2
Informal votes		983	2.1	+0.2
Turnout		46,806	94.7	+0.8
Two-party-preferred result
National	Paul Toole	31,940	73.7	+36.7
Labor	Dale Turner	11,426	26.3	−36.7
National gain from Labor		Swing	+36.7	

=== Baulkham Hills ===
2011 New South Wales state election: Baulkham Hills
Party	Candidate	Votes	%	±%
Liberal	David Elliott	31,000	66.0	+14.4
Labor	Tony Hay	8,337	17.7	−13.3
Greens	Mick Hollins	5,360	11.4	+3.9
Christian Democrats	Kaia Thorpe	2,280	4.9	+0.0
Total formal votes		46,977	97.2	−0.3
Informal votes		1,330	2.8	+0.3
Turnout		48,307	94.8	+0.5
Two-party-preferred result
Liberal	David Elliott	32,963	76.4	+15.9
Labor	Tony Hay	10,161	23.6	−15.9
Liberal hold		Swing	+15.9	

=== Bega ===
2011 New South Wales state election: Bega
Party	Candidate	Votes	%	±%
Liberal	Andrew Constance	26,122	59.0	+12.1
Labor	Leanne Atkinson	9,749	22.0	−12.9
Greens	Harriett Swift	5,358	12.1	+4.6
Independent	Ivan McKay	2,341	5.3	+5.3
Christian Democrats	Ursula Bennett	716	1.6	+0.0
Total formal votes		44,286	96.9	−1.0
Informal votes		1,426	3.1	+1.0
Turnout		45,712	92.0	−0.5
Two-party-preferred result
Liberal	Andrew Constance	27,369	68.6	+13.6
Labor	Leanne Atkinson	12,505	31.4	−13.6
Liberal hold		Swing	+13.6	

=== Blacktown ===
2011 New South Wales state election: Blacktown
Party	Candidate	Votes	%	±%
Labor	John Robertson	19,419	44.1	−17.6
Liberal	Karlo Siljeg	16,047	36.4	+15.7
Christian Democrats	Bernie Gesling	2,639	6.0	−1.1
Greens	Paul Taylor	2,473	5.6	+0.8
Independent	Wayne Olling	1,177	2.7	+2.7
Independent	Louise Kedwell	1,166	2.6	+2.6
Independent	Greg Coulter	1,152	2.6	+2.6
Total formal votes		44,073	95.5	−0.7
Informal votes		2,074	4.5	+0.7
Turnout		46,147	93.4	0.0
Two-party-preferred result
Labor	John Robertson	20,796	53.7	−18.7
Liberal	Karlo Siljeg	17,910	46.3	+18.7
Labor hold		Swing	−18.7	

=== Blue Mountains ===
2011 New South Wales state election: Blue Mountains
Party	Candidate	Votes	%	±%
Liberal	Roza Sage	17,681	39.1	+10.6
Labor	Trish Doyle	10,253	22.7	−18.1
Independent	Janet Mays	7,804	17.3	+17.3
Greens	Kerrin O'Grady	7,647	16.9	+0.7
Christian Democrats	Merv Cox	1,841	4.1	+4.1
Total formal votes		45,226	97.5	−0.4
Informal votes		1,141	2.5	+0.4
Turnout		46,367	94.0	
Two-party-preferred result
Liberal	Roza Sage	20,736	54.7	+15.8
Labor	Trish Doyle	17,144	45.3	−15.8
Liberal gain from Labor		Swing	+15.8	

=== Burrinjuck ===
2011 New South Wales state election: Burrinjuck
Party	Candidate	Votes	%	±%
National	Katrina Hodgkinson	33,339	74.4	+9.7
Labor	Luna Zivadinovic	6,653	14.8	−14.3
Greens	Iain Fyfe	3,574	8.0	+1.8
Christian Democrats	Ann Woods	1,262	2.8	+2.8
Total formal votes		44,828	97.8	−0.3
Informal votes		1,025	2.2	+0.3
Turnout		45,853	93.8	
Two-party-preferred result
National	Katrina Hodgkinson	34,618	81.1	+13.7
Labor	Luna Zivadinovic	8,093	18.9	−13.7
National hold		Swing	+13.7	

=== Cabramatta ===
2011 New South Wales state election: Cabramatta
Party	Candidate	Votes	%	±%
Labor	Nick Lalich	20,924	46.7	−22.3
Liberal	Dai Le	18,990	42.4	+26.1
Greens	Daniel Griffiths	3,385	7.6	+0.7
Christian Democrats	Peter Tadros	1,467	3.3	+3.3
Total formal votes		44,766	96.1	0.0
Informal votes		1,839	3.9	0.0
Turnout		46,605	93.0	
Two-party-preferred result
Labor	Nick Lalich	21,702	52.1	−26.9
Liberal	Dai Le	19,934	47.9	+26.9
Labor hold		Swing	−26.9	

=== Camden ===
2011 New South Wales state election: Camden
Party	Candidate	Votes	%	±%
Liberal	Chris Patterson	27,847	60.5	+21.9
Labor	Geoff Corrigan	12,115	26.3	−18.5
Greens	Danica Sajn	2,748	6.0	+0.8
Family First	Domenic Zappia	1,954	4.2	+4.2
Christian Democrats	Colin Broadbridge	1,385	3.0	−0.8
Total formal votes		46,049	96.4	−0.4
Informal votes		1,716	3.6	+0.4
Turnout		47,765	94.8	
Two-party-preferred result
Liberal	Chris Patterson	29,363	68.9	+22.8
Labor	Geoff Corrigan	13,279	31.1	−22.8
Liberal gain from Labor		Swing	+22.8	

=== Campbelltown ===
2011 New South Wales state election: Campbelltown
Party	Candidate	Votes	%	±%
Liberal	Bryan Doyle	18,152	44.9	+20.5
Labor	Nick Bleasdale	15,618	38.6	−17.0
Greens	Victoria Waldron Hahn	2,677	6.6	+0.0
Independent	Chimezie Kingsley	2,015	5.0	+5.0
Christian Democrats	David Wright	1,957	4.8	−1.3
Total formal votes		40,419	95.6	−0.6
Informal votes		1,854	4.4	+0.6
Turnout		42,273	93.0	
Two-party-preferred result
Liberal	Bryan Doyle	19,510	53.4	+21.8
Labor	Nick Bleasdale	17,048	46.6	−21.8
Liberal gain from Labor		Swing	+21.8	

=== Canterbury ===
2011 New South Wales state election: Canterbury
Party	Candidate	Votes	%	±%
Labor	Linda Burney	21,417	47.2	−9.9
Liberal	Ken Nam	16,115	35.5	+17.2
Greens	Marc Rerceretnam	6,186	13.6	+0.6
Christian Democrats	Albert Fam	1,673	3.7	+0.5
Total formal votes		45,391	95.9	+0.1
Informal votes		1,932	4.1	−0.1
Turnout		47,323	91.9	−0.4
Two-party-preferred result
Labor	Linda Burney	24,356	58.3	−18.8
Liberal	Ken Nam	17,393	41.7	+18.8
Labor hold		Swing	−18.8	

=== Castle Hill ===
2011 New South Wales state election: Castle Hill
Party	Candidate	Votes	%	±%
Liberal	Dominic Perrottet	32,466	68.7	+12.2
Labor	Ryan Tracey	6,690	14.2	−8.8
Greens	Alex Wallbank	3,717	7.9	−1.1
Christian Democrats	Aileen Mountifield	1,765	3.7	−1.6
Independent	Aaron Mendham	1,609	3.4	+3.4
Family First	Ari Katsoulas	1,025	2.2	+2.2
Total formal votes		47,272	97.1	−0.5
Informal votes		1,414	2.9	+0.5
Turnout		48,686	93.7	+0.4
Two-party-preferred result
Liberal	Dominic Perrottet	34,421	80.8	+11.8
Labor	Ryan Tracey	8,163	19.2	−11.8
Liberal hold		Swing	+11.8	

=== Cessnock ===
2011 New South Wales state election: Cessnock
Party	Candidate	Votes	%	±%
Labor	Clayton Barr	15,812	34.5	−20.3
National	Alison Davey	11,309	24.7	−6.7
Independent	Dale Troy	8,640	18.8	+18.8
Greens	James Ryan	3,913	8.5	−5.3
Independent	Allan Stapleford	2,297	5.0	+5.0
Independent	Allan McCudden	2,284	5.0	+5.0
Christian Democrats	Wayne Riley	1,598	3.5	+3.5
Total formal votes		45,853	95.3	−1.6
Informal votes		2,240	4.7	+1.6
Turnout		48,093	94.2	+0.1
Two-party-preferred result
Labor	Clayton Barr	18,679	54.4	−8.1
National	Alison Davey	15,687	45.6	+8.1
Labor hold		Swing	−8.1	

=== Charlestown ===
2011 New South Wales state election: Charlestown
Party	Candidate	Votes	%	±%
Liberal	Andrew Cornwell	19,085	43.8	+25.2
Labor	Matthew Morris	12,590	28.9	−14.6
Greens	Paula Morrow	3,672	8.4	−1.8
Independent	Barry Johnston	3,217	7.4	+7.4
Fishing Party	Craig Oaten	1,869	4.3	+4.3
Christian Democrats	Steve Camilleri	949	2.2	−1.0
Family First	Bruce Foley	943	2.2	+2.2
Independent	Ben McMullen	539	1.2	+1.2
Independent	Adrian Schofield	460	1.1	+1.1
Independent	Ajay Martin	228	0.5	+0.5
Total formal votes		43,552	96.5	−0.7
Informal votes		1,575	3.5	+0.7
Turnout		45,127	94.4	+0.2
Two-party-preferred result
Liberal	Andrew Cornwell	21,856	59.9	+59.9
Labor	Matthew Morris	14,661	40.1	−16.9
Liberal gain from Labor		Swing	N/A	

=== Clarence ===
2011 New South Wales state election: Clarence
Party	Candidate	Votes	%	±%
National	Steve Cansdell	28,717	62.8	+9.9
Independent	Richie Williamson	7,789	17.0	+17.0
Labor	Colin Clague	4,683	10.2	−19.8
Greens	Janet Cavanaugh	3,147	6.9	−0.2
Christian Democrats	Bethany Camac	822	1.8	+1.8
Family First	Kristen Bromell	598	1.3	+1.3
Total formal votes		45,756	97.9	−0.1
Informal votes		961	2.1	+0.1
Turnout		46,717	92.8	−0.3
Notional two-party-preferred count
National	Steve Cansdell	31,625	81.4	+19.8
Labor	Colin Clague	7,237	18.6	−19.8
Two-candidate-preferred result
National	Steve Cansdell	30,120	73.3	+11.8
Independent	Richie Williamson	10,963	26.7	+26.7
National hold		Swing	+11.8	

=== Coffs Harbour ===
2011 New South Wales state election: Coffs Harbour
Party	Candidate	Votes	%	±%
National	Andrew Fraser	29,798	66.1	+14.1
Labor	David Quinn	6,392	14.2	−6.5
Greens	Rodney Degens	4,749	10.5	+3.1
Independent	Paul Templeton	2,575	5.7	+5.7
Christian Democrats	Deborah Lions	1,591	3.5	−0.2
Total formal votes		45,105	97.5	−0.8
Informal votes		1,140	2.5	+0.8
Turnout		46,245	91.3	
Two-party-preferred result
National	Andrew Fraser	31,956	77.2	+9.6
Labor	David Quinn	9,421	22.8	−9.6
National hold		Swing	+9.6	

=== Coogee ===
2011 New South Wales state election: Coogee
Party	Candidate	Votes	%	±%
Liberal	Bruce Notley-Smith	20,224	47.1	+11.4
Labor	Paul Pearce	10,828	25.2	−13.8
Greens	Sue Doran	9,449	22.0	+0.9
Independent	Nathan Jones	956	2.2	+2.2
Independent	Stuart Burney	868	2.0	+2.0
Christian Democrats	Andrew McGowan	581	1.4	+1.4
Total formal votes		42,906	97.6	+0.1
Informal votes		1,035	2.4	−0.1
Turnout		43,941	89.4	+0.5
Two-party-preferred result
Liberal	Bruce Notley-Smith	21,987	58.2	+15.5
Labor	Paul Pearce	15,762	41.8	−15.5
Liberal gain from Labor		Swing	+15.5	

=== Cronulla ===
2011 New South Wales state election: Cronulla
Party	Candidate	Votes	%	±%
Liberal	Mark Speakman	29,845	66.1	+9.4
Labor	Stefanie Jones	8,653	19.2	−6.9
Greens	Josh Peacock	3,681	8.1	+1.3
Christian Democrats	Beth Smith	1,571	3.5	−1.1
Independent	Patricia Poulos	1,424	3.2	+3.2
Total formal votes		45,174	97.2	−0.5
Informal votes		1,291	2.8	+0.5
Turnout		46,465	93.3	−0.1
Two-party-preferred result
Liberal	Mark Speakman	31,382	75.5	+8.1
Labor	Stefanie Jones	10,157	24.5	−8.1
Liberal hold		Swing	+8.1	

=== Davidson ===
2011 New South Wales state election: Davidson
Party	Candidate	Votes	%	±%
Liberal	Jonathan O'Dea	33,112	74.2	+13.8
Greens	John Davis	5,572	12.5	−1.0
Labor	Mathew Gilliland	3,626	8.1	−8.7
Independent	Helen Owen	1,380	3.1	+3.1
Christian Democrats	Peter Chapman	924	2.1	−2.5
Total formal votes		44,614	97.9	+0.7
Informal votes		936	2.1	−0.7
Turnout		45,550	92.9	
Notional two-party-preferred count
Liberal	Jonathan O'Dea	34,839	86.5	+11.8
Labor	Mathew Gilliland	5,456	13.5	−11.8
Two-candidate-preferred result
Liberal	Jonathan O'Dea	34,294	83.4	+8.7
Greens	John Davis	6,842	16.6	+16.6
Liberal hold		Swing	+8.7	

=== Drummoyne ===
2011 New South Wales state election: Drummoyne
Party	Candidate	Votes	%	±%
Liberal	John Sidoti	26,397	56.0	+19.4
Labor	Angelo Tsirekas	11,872	25.2	−22.1
Greens	Adam Butler	4,624	9.8	+0.4
Hatton's Independent Team	Alex Elliott	3,182	6.8	+6.8
Christian Democrats	Marc Gesling	1,042	2.2	+2.2
Total formal votes		47,117	97.5	+0.2
Informal votes		1,226	2.5	−0.2
Turnout		48,343	93.5	
Two-party-preferred result
Liberal	John Sidoti	28,349	66.7	+24.3
Labor	Angelo Tsirekas	14,183	33.3	−24.3
Liberal gain from Labor		Swing	+24.3	

=== Dubbo ===
2011 New South Wales state election: Dubbo
Party	Candidate	Votes	%	±%
National	Troy Grant	27,191	60.0	+17.4
Independent	Dawn Fardell	14,129	31.2	−10.5
Labor	Andrew Brooks	2,893	6.4	−4.8
Greens	Matt Parmeter	1,119	2.5	+0.0
Total formal votes		45,332	98.1	+0.3
Informal votes		898	1.9	−0.3
Turnout		46,230	94.4	+0.2
Notional two-party-preferred count
National	Troy Grant	31,271	83.9	+8.9
Labor	Andrew Brooks	5,983	16.1	−8.9
Two-candidate-preferred result
National	Troy Grant	27,714	63.7	+14.5
Independent	Dawn Fardell	15,827	36.4	−14.5
National gain from Independent		Swing	+14.5	

=== East Hills ===
2011 New South Wales state election: East Hills
Party	Candidate	Votes	%	±%
Liberal	Glenn Brookes	17,929	41.8	+14.3
Labor	Alan Ashton	17,528	40.8	−12.8
Greens	Susan Roberts	2,105	4.9	−1.2
Independent	Tony Batch	1,879	4.4	+4.4
Christian Democrats	Mark Falanga	1,771	4.1	−2.5
Family First	Stan Hurley	991	2.3	+2.3
Democratic Labor	Boutros Zalloua	715	1.7	+1.7
Total formal votes		42,918	96.0	−0.2
Informal votes		1,770	4.0	+0.2
Turnout		44,688	93.8	
Two-party-preferred result
Liberal	Glenn Brookes	19,704	50.6	+14.7
Labor	Alan Ashton	19,210	49.4	−14.7
Liberal gain from Labor		Swing	+14.7	

=== Epping ===
2011 New South Wales state election: Epping
Party	Candidate	Votes	%	±%
Liberal	Greg Smith	27,543	61.4	+18.6
Labor	Amy Smith	7,142	15.9	−10.0
Greens	Emma Heyde	6,691	14.9	+2.7
Christian Democrats	John Kingsmill	1,775	4.0	−0.3
Independent	Victor Waterson	1,162	2.6	+2.6
Family First	John Thomas	542	1.2	+1.2
Total formal votes		44,855	97.5	−0.1
Informal votes		1,150	2.5	+0.1
Turnout		46,005	93.1	+0.4
Two-party-preferred result
Liberal	Greg Smith	29,881	75.2	+17.2
Labor	Amy Smith	9,868	24.8	−17.2
Liberal hold		Swing	+17.2	

=== Fairfield ===
2011 New South Wales state election: Fairfield
Party	Candidate	Votes	%	±%
Labor	Guy Zangari	17,858	40.7	−17.6
Liberal	Charbel Saliba	16,657	37.9	+15.3
Greens	Annie Nielsen	2,890	6.6	+0.4
Christian Democrats	Eileen Nasr	2,332	5.3	+0.0
Independent	David Ball	1,489	3.4	+3.4
Social Justice Network	Ahmad Al-Yasiry	1,281	2.9	+2.9
Communist League	Linda Harris	1,074	2.4	+2.4
Socialist Alliance	Daicy Olaya	329	0.7	+0.7
Total formal votes		43,910	93.5	−1.7
Informal votes		3,061	6.5	+1.7
Turnout		46,971	91.6	−0.6
Two-party-preferred result
Labor	Guy Zangari	19,189	51.7	−18.7
Liberal	Charbel Saliba	17,930	48.3	+18.7
Labor hold		Swing	−18.7	

=== Gosford ===
2011 New South Wales state election: Gosford
Party	Candidate	Votes	%	±%
Liberal	Chris Holstein	22,672	50.2	+15.4
Labor	Katie Smith	12,472	27.6	−15.1
Greens	Peter Freewater	5,391	11.9	+5.0
Independent	Jake Cassar	2,227	4.9	+4.9
Christian Democrats	Ann-Marie Kitchener	1,478	3.3	+0.4
Independent	Patrick Aiken	935	2.1	+2.1
Total formal votes		45,175	96.6	−0.7
Informal votes		1,573	3.4	+0.7
Turnout		46,748	93.2	+0.2
Two-party-preferred result
Liberal	Chris Holstein	24,425	61.9	+16.7
Labor	Katie Smith	15,052	38.1	−16.7
Liberal gain from Labor		Swing	+16.7	

=== Goulburn ===
2011 New South Wales state election: Goulburn
Party	Candidate	Votes	%	±%
Liberal	Pru Goward	27,828	61.3	+21.5
Labor	Crystal Validakis	6,690	14.7	−7.8
Hatton's Independent Team	Robert Parker	4,962	10.9	+10.9
Greens	Maree Byrne	4,341	9.6	+3.0
Christian Democrats	Adrian Van Der Byl	1,551	3.4	−0.8
Total formal votes		45,372	96.8	−1.0
Informal votes		1,508	3.2	+1.0
Turnout		46,880	93.7	0.0
Two-party-preferred result
Liberal	Pru Goward	30,540	76.6	+18.0
Labor	Crystal Validakis	9,312	23.4	−18.0
Liberal hold		Swing	+18.0	

=== Granville ===
2011 New South Wales state election: Granville
Party	Candidate	Votes	%	±%
Liberal	Tony Issa	18,510	41.3	+13.1
Labor	David Borger	17,000	38.0	−10.2
Independent	Paul Garrard	4,488	10.0	+0.5
Christian Democrats	Alex Sharah	2,472	5.5	+1.0
Greens	Richard Kennedy	2,325	5.2	+1.2
Total formal votes		44,795	95.6	−0.3
Informal votes		2,057	4.4	+0.3
Turnout		46,852	91.9	
Two-party-preferred result
Liberal	Tony Issa	21,276	52.7	+13.8
Labor	David Borger	19,093	47.3	−13.8
Liberal gain from Labor		Swing	+13.8	

=== Hawkesbury ===
2011 New South Wales state election: Hawkesbury
Party	Candidate	Votes	%	±%
Liberal	Ray Williams	35,793	75.4	+29.7
Labor	Peter Wicks	5,276	11.1	−4.9
Greens	Leigh Williams	4,705	9.9	+3.4
Christian Democrats	Muriel Sultana	1,726	3.6	+3.6
Total formal votes		47,500	97.3	−0.1
Informal votes		1,300	2.7	+0.1
Turnout		48,800	95.1	
Two-party-preferred result
Liberal	Ray Williams	37,401	84.7	+28.7
Labor	Peter Wicks	6,755	15.3	+15.3
Liberal hold		Swing	+28.7	

=== Heathcote ===
2011 New South Wales state election: Heathcote
Party	Candidate	Votes	%	±%
Liberal	Lee Evans	20,700	47.0	+14.8
Labor	Paul McLeay	10,074	22.9	−20.3
Greens	Phil Smith	6,972	15.8	+1.3
Hatton's Independent Team	Greg Petty	3,471	7.9	+7.9
Christian Democrats	Chris Atlee	1,631	3.7	−2.0
Independent	Peter Bussa	1,225	2.8	+2.8
Total formal votes		44,073	96.9	−0.9
Informal votes		1,419	3.1	+0.9
Turnout		45,492	94.2	+0.2
Two-party-preferred result
Liberal	Lee Evans	22,939	62.9	+21.7
Labor	Paul McLeay	13,512	37.1	−21.7
Liberal gain from Labor		Swing	+21.7	

=== Heffron ===
2011 New South Wales state election: Heffron
Party	Candidate	Votes	%	±%
Labor	Kristina Keneally	18,870	41.2	−15.2
Liberal	Patrice Pandeleos	15,226	33.3	+11.5
Greens	Mehreen Faruqi	8,681	19.0	−0.7
Independent	John Forster	1,865	4.1	+4.1
Christian Democrats	Katalin Ferrier	871	1.9	+1.9
	Trevor Rowe	254	0.6	+0.6
Total formal votes		45,767	96.7	+0.4
Informal votes		1,548	3.3	−0.4
Turnout		47,315	88.7	
Two-party-preferred result
Labor	Kristina Keneally	22,299	57.1	−16.6
Liberal	Patrice Pandeleos	16,780	42.9	+16.6
Labor hold		Swing	−16.6	

=== Hornsby ===
2011 New South Wales state election: Hornsby
Party	Candidate	Votes	%	±%
Liberal	Matt Kean	23,317	49.4	−3.5
Independent	Nick Berman	10,418	22.1	+22.1
Greens	Toni Wright-Turner	5,242	11.1	+0.6
Labor	Nicholas Car	4,846	10.3	−12.6
Independent	Mick Gallagher	1,876	4.0	+0.9
Christian Democrats	Leighton Thew	1,495	3.2	−1.5
Total formal votes		47,194	97.5	−0.1
Informal votes		1,228	2.5	+0.1
Turnout		48,422	94.5	+0.7
Notional two-party-preferred count
Liberal	Matt Kean	29,618	77.1	+11.6
Labor	Nicholas Car	8,797	22.9	−11.6
Two-candidate-preferred result
Liberal	Matt Kean	25,158	62.1	−4.4
Independent	Nick Berman	15,361	37.9	+37.9
Liberal hold		Swing	−4.4	

=== Keira ===
2011 New South Wales state election: Keira
Party	Candidate	Votes	%	±%
Labor	Ryan Park	17,186	39.1	−18.8
Liberal	John Dorahy	15,657	35.6	+15.1
Greens	George Takacs	5,388	12.2	−0.7
Independent	Ray Jaeger	3,684	8.4	+8.4
Christian Democrats	Steven Avasalu	1,492	3.4	−1.5
Socialist Alliance	Paola Harvey	585	1.3	+1.3
Total formal votes		43,992	96.8	−0.8
Informal votes		1,431	3.2	+0.8
Turnout		45,423	94.0	+0.3
Two-party-preferred result
Labor	Ryan Park	20,530	53.8	−18.2
Liberal	John Dorahy	17,604	46.2	+18.2
Labor hold		Swing	−18.2	

=== Kiama ===
2011 New South Wales state election: Kiama
Party	Candidate	Votes	%	±%
Liberal	Gareth Ward	19,898	42.5	+12.0
Labor	Matt Brown	13,366	28.6	−22.1
Independent	Sandra McCarthy	6,009	12.8	+12.8
Greens	Ben Van Der Wijngaart	4,126	8.8	+0.2
Christian Democrats	Steve Ryan	1,805	3.9	−0.9
Independent	Adrian Daly	1,576	3.4	+3.4
Total formal votes		46,780	97.7	−0.2
Informal votes		1,091	2.3	+0.2
Turnout		47,871	94.6	+0.5
Two-party-preferred result
Liberal	Gareth Ward	23,030	57.5	+19.4
Labor	Matt Brown	17,052	42.5	−19.4
Liberal gain from Labor		Swing	+19.4	

=== Kogarah ===
2011 New South Wales state election: Kogarah
Party	Candidate	Votes	%	±%
Labor	Cherie Burton	19,668	44.2	−12.6
Liberal	Miray Hindi	18,360	41.3	+14.3
Greens	Simone Francis	3,952	8.9	+1.8
Christian Democrats	Joseph Abdel Massih	2,507	5.6	+1.6
Total formal votes		44,487	96.0	−0.8
Informal votes		1,851	4.0	+0.8
Turnout		46,338	93.2	
Two-party-preferred result
Labor	Cherie Burton	21,207	51.9	−15.8
Liberal	Miray Hindi	19,665	48.1	+15.8
Labor hold		Swing	−15.8	

=== Ku-ring-gai ===
2011 New South Wales state election: Ku-ring-gai
Party	Candidate	Votes	%	±%
Liberal	Barry O'Farrell	33,061	72.7	+7.1
Greens	Susie Gemmell	6,395	14.1	+0.9
Labor	David Armstrong	3,590	7.9	−5.9
Save Our State	William Bourke	952	2.1	+2.1
Christian Democrats	Witold Wiszniewski	948	2.1	−1.2
Outdoor Recreation	Alexander Gutman	536	1.2	+1.2
Total formal votes		45,482	98.3	+0.3
Informal votes		794	1.7	−0.3
Turnout		46,276	92.7	
Notional two-party-preferred count
Liberal	Barry O'Farrell	34,904	87.0	+8.0
Labor	David Armstrong	5,236	13.0	–8.0
Liberal hold		Swing	+2.3	
Two-candidate-preferred result
Liberal	Barry O'Farrell	34,212	81.3	+2.3
Greens	Susie Gemmell	7,858	18.7	+18.7
Liberal hold		Swing	+2.3	

=== Lake Macquarie ===
2011 New South Wales state election: Lake Macquarie
Party	Candidate	Votes	%	±%
Independent	Greg Piper	19,678	43.7	+13.4
Liberal	John McDonald	12,644	28.1	+8.6
Labor	Marcus Mariani	8,385	18.6	−21.9
Greens	Charmian Eckersley	3,094	6.9	+1.1
Christian Democrats	Kim Gritten	1,269	2.8	+0.7
Total formal votes		45,070	97.0	−0.7
Informal votes		1,392	3.0	+0.7
Turnout		46,462	93.4	
Notional two-party-preferred count
Liberal	John McDonald	18,147	59.4	+24.4
Labor	Marcus Mariani	12,414	40.6	−24.4
Two-candidate-preferred result
Independent	Greg Piper	25,356	64.9	+14.7
Liberal	John McDonald	13,733	35.1	+35.1
Independent hold		Swing	+14.7	

=== Lakemba ===
2011 New South Wales state election: Lakemba
Party	Candidate	Votes	%	±%
Labor	Robert Furolo	21,595	48.6	−25.3
Liberal	Michael Hawatt	16,333	36.8	+23.6
Greens	Linda Eisler	3,374	7.6	+3.7
Christian Democrats	Sungjae Kam	1,998	4.5	+0.5
Social Justice Network	Omar Quiader	1,133	2.5	+2.5
Total formal votes		44,433	94.8	−0.9
Informal votes		2,419	5.2	+0.9
Turnout		46,852	90.8	
Two-party-preferred result
Labor	Robert Furolo	22,983	57.0	−27.0
Liberal	Michael Hawatt	17,337	43.0	+27.0
Labor hold		Swing	−27.0	

=== Lane Cove ===
2011 New South Wales state election: Lane Cove
Party	Candidate	Votes	%	±%
Liberal	Anthony Roberts	28,350	65.6	+13.4
Greens	Keith McIlroy	7,646	17.7	+3.0
Labor	Mario Tsang	6,046	14.0	−10.5
Christian Democrats	Esther Heng	1,174	2.7	+0.4
Total formal votes		43,216	97.4	0.0
Informal votes		1,173	2.6	0.0
Turnout		44,389	92.5	+0.6
Notional two-party-preferred count
Liberal	Anthony Roberts	30,093	77.3	+15.0
Labor	Mario Tsang	8,819	22.7	–15.0
Two-candidate-preferred result
Liberal	Anthony Roberts	29,556	75.7	+13.3
Greens	Keith McIlroy	9,496	24.3	+24.3
Liberal hold		Swing	+13.3	

=== Lismore ===
2011 New South Wales state election: Lismore
Party	Candidate	Votes	%	±%
National	Thomas George	27,371	61.2	+7.0
Greens	Susan Stock	9,157	20.5	+2.7
Labor	Andrew Moy	5,902	13.2	−12.4
Independent	Russell Kilarney	1,514	3.4	+3.4
Christian Democrats	Margaret Kay	801	1.8	+1.8
Total formal votes		44,745	98.0	−0.4
Informal votes		921	2.0	+0.4
Turnout		45,666	90.8	
Notional two-party-preferred count
National	Thomas George	29,046	74.3	+14.3
Labor	Andrew Moy	10,041	25.7	−14.3
Two-candidate-preferred result
National	Thomas George	28,993	70.2	+10.2
Greens	Susan Stock	12,307	29.8	+29.8
National hold		Swing	+10.2	

=== Liverpool ===
2011 New South Wales state election: Liverpool
Party	Candidate	Votes	%	±%
Labor	Paul Lynch	22,223	51.4	−13.5
Liberal	Mazhar Hadid	11,883	27.5	+9.5
Independent	Michael Byrne	3,740	8.7	+8.7
Christian Democrats	Matt Attia	2,916	6.7	+2.6
Greens	Signe Westerberg	2,451	5.7	+1.7
Total formal votes		43,213	93.9	−1.6
Informal votes		2,828	6.1	+1.6
Turnout		46,041	92.3	
Two-party-preferred result
Labor	Paul Lynch	24,276	64.7	−12.2
Liberal	Mazhar Hadid	13,241	35.3	+12.2
Labor hold		Swing	−12.2	

=== Londonderry ===
2011 New South Wales state election: Londonderry
Party	Candidate	Votes	%	±%
Liberal	Bart Bassett	22,489	52.7	+18.3
Labor	Allan Shearan	12,953	30.4	−17.2
Greens	Peta Holmes	3,257	7.6	+1.0
Family First	Steven Said	1,992	4.7	+4.7
Christian Democrats	Caroline Fraser	1,955	4.6	−2.1
Total formal votes		42,646	96.1	0.0
Informal votes		1,752	3.9	0.0
Turnout		44,398	93.2	
Two-party-preferred result
Liberal	Bart Bassett	24,149	62.3	+19.2
Labor	Allan Shearan	14,621	37.7	−19.2
Liberal gain from Labor		Swing	+19.2	

=== Macquarie Fields ===
2011 New South Wales state election: Macquarie Fields
Party	Candidate	Votes	%	±%
Labor	Andrew McDonald	18,157	40.1	−12.9
Liberal	Sam Eskaros	16,727	37.0	+3.9
Independent	Nola Fraser	4,738	10.5	+10.5
Christian Democrats	Joshua Green	2,647	5.8	+1.5
Greens	Bill Cashman	1,744	3.9	−1.2
Independent	Mick Allen	717	1.6	−0.1
Democratic Labor	Simon McCaffrey	531	1.2	+1.2
Total formal votes		45,261	95.1	−0.6
Informal votes		2,356	4.9	+0.6
Turnout		47,617	92.0	
Two-party-preferred result
Labor	Andrew McDonald	19,626	51.5	−9.7
Liberal	Sam Eskaros	18,510	48.5	+9.7
Labor hold		Swing	−9.7	

=== Maitland ===
2011 New South Wales state election: Maitland
Party	Candidate	Votes	%	±%
Liberal	Robyn Parker	19,600	40.8	+20.3
Labor	Frank Terenzini	14,160	29.5	−10.2
Hatton's Independent Team	Kellie Tranter	9,890	20.6	+12.4
Greens	John Brown	3,242	6.8	+1.7
Independent	Anna Balfour	1,127	2.3	+2.3
Total formal votes		48,019	96.9	−0.9
Informal votes		1,535	3.1	+0.9
Turnout		49,554	94.5	
Two-party-preferred result
Liberal	Robyn Parker	22,057	56.3	+16.0
Labor	Frank Terenzini	17,135	43.7	−16.0
Liberal gain from Labor		Swing	+16.0	

=== Manly ===
2011 New South Wales state election: Manly
Party	Candidate	Votes	%	±%
Liberal	Mike Baird	30,212	70.2	+25.1
Greens	Ian Hehir	7,656	17.8	+8.1
Labor	Jennifer Jary	4,469	10.4	+0.6
Christian Democrats	Timothy Wainwright	718	1.7	+0.3
Total formal votes		43,055	97.7	−0.4
Informal votes		1,018	2.3	+0.4
Turnout		44,073	91.2	+0.6
Notional two-party-preferred count
Liberal	Mike Baird	31,874	82.4	+10.6
Labor	Jennifer Jary	6,821	17.6	−10.6
Two-candidate-preferred result
Liberal	Mike Baird	30,923	77.0	+23.7
Greens	Ian Hehir	9,219	23.0	+23.0
Liberal hold		Swing	+23.7	

=== Maroubra ===
2011 New South Wales state election: Maroubra
Party	Candidate	Votes	%	±%
Labor	Michael Daley	20,019	44.3	−8.5
Liberal	Michael Feneley	19,737	43.7	+16.0
Greens	Murray Matson	4,504	10.0	−1.9
Christian Democrats	Jacquie Shiha	884	2.0	+2.0
Total formal votes		45,144	97.1	+0.4
Informal votes		1,359	2.9	−0.4
Turnout		46,503	92.6	
Two-party-preferred result
Labor	Michael Daley	21,930	51.6	−14.6
Liberal	Michael Feneley	20,607	48.4	+14.6
Labor hold		Swing	−14.6	

=== Marrickville ===
2011 New South Wales state election: Marrickville
Party	Candidate	Votes	%	±%
Labor	Carmel Tebbutt	17,413	38.1	−8.5
Greens	Fiona Byrne	16,395	35.9	+3.3
Liberal	Rosana Tyler	8,714	19.1	+6.5
Socialist Alliance	Pip Hinman	860	1.9	+0.3
Independent	Paul Quealy	817	1.8	+1.8
Socialist Equality	James Cogan	572	1.3	+1.3
Christian Democrats	Kylie Laurence	531	1.2	−0.3
Family First	Jimmy Liem	395	0.9	+0.9
Total formal votes		45,697	97.1	+0.2
Informal votes		1,377	2.9	−0.2
Turnout		47,074	90.2	+0.3
Notional two-party-preferred count
Labor	Carmel Tebbutt	24,777	70.4	−10.9
Liberal	Rosana Tyler	10,435	29.6	+10.9
Two-candidate-preferred result
Labor	Carmel Tebbutt	19,046	50.9	−6.6
Greens	Fiona Byrne	18,370	49.1	+6.6
Labor hold		Swing	−6.6	

=== Menai ===
2011 New South Wales state election: Menai
Party	Candidate	Votes	%	±%
Liberal	Melanie Gibbons	27,593	61.0	+18.4
Labor	Peter Scaysbrook	8,732	19.3	−26.1
Greens	Simone Morrissey	3,502	7.7	+3.2
Independent	Jim McGoldrick	3,040	6.7	+6.7
Christian Democrats	Lindsay Johnson	2,371	5.2	+5.2
Total formal votes		45,238	96.8	−0.7
Informal votes		1,479	3.2	+0.7
Turnout		46,717	94.3	+0.2
Two-party-preferred result
Liberal	Melanie Gibbons	29,954	74.4	+27.1
Labor	Peter Scaysbrook	10,313	25.6	−27.1
Liberal gain from Labor		Swing	−27.1	

=== Miranda ===
2011 New South Wales state election: Miranda
Party	Candidate	Votes	%	±%
Liberal	Graham Annesley	26,662	60.7	+18.3
Labor	Therese Cook	9,770	22.3	−20.5
Greens	Naomi Waizer	3,853	8.8	+2.1
Independent	John Brett	2,074	4.7	+3.1
Christian Democrats	Ern Hemmings	1,549	3.5	−0.1
Total formal votes		43,908	97.3	−0.7
Informal votes		1,218	2.7	+0.7
Turnout		45,126	94.8	
Two-party-preferred result
Liberal	Graham Annesley	28,395	71.0	+21.8
Labor	Therese Cook	11,598	29.0	−21.8
Liberal gain from Labor		Swing	+21.8	

=== Monaro ===
2011 New South Wales state election: Monaro
Party	Candidate	Votes	%	±%
National	John Barilaro	21,134	47.1	+7.8
Labor	Steve Whan	18,381	41.0	−6.9
Greens	Paul Cockram	3,524	7.9	−2.1
Independent	Kingsley Warburton	1,218	2.7	+2.7
Christian Democrats	Deanne Graf	618	1.4	+1.4
Total formal votes		44,875	97.6	+0.1
Informal votes		1,083	2.4	−0.1
Turnout		45,958	91.8	
Two-party-preferred result
National	John Barilaro	21,918	52.1	+8.4
Labor	Steve Whan	20,178	47.9	−8.4
National gain from Labor		Swing	+8.4	

=== Mount Druitt ===
2011 New South Wales state election: Mount Druitt
Party	Candidate	Votes	%	±%
Labor	Richard Amery	20,037	48.0	−16.0
Liberal	Venus Priest	14,781	35.4	+15.8
Christian Democrats	Dave Vincent	3,519	8.4	+1.1
Greens	Debbie Robertson	3,380	8.1	+2.9
Total formal votes		41,717	94.6	−0.9
Informal votes		2,378	5.4	+0.9
Turnout		44,095	91.4	−0.8
Two-party-preferred result
Labor	Richard Amery	21,352	56.7	−18.6
Liberal	Venus Priest	16,286	43.3	+18.6
Labor hold		Swing	−18.6	

=== Mulgoa ===
2011 New South Wales state election: Mulgoa
Party	Candidate	Votes	%	±%
Liberal	Tanya Davies	23,822	53.2	+17.9
Labor	Prue Guillaume	14,270	31.9	−23.1
Greens	Patrick Darley-Jones	2,554	5.7	+0.8
Independent Australia First	Tony Robinson	1,861	4.2	+4.2
Christian Democrats	Luke Portelli	1,681	3.8	+3.8
Democratic Labor	Emily Dunn	609	1.4	+1.4
Total formal votes		44,797	95.9	−0.5
Informal votes		1,898	4.1	+0.5
Turnout		46,695	94.6	
Two-party-preferred result
Liberal	Tanya Davies	25,223	62.0	+23.2
Labor	Prue Guillaume	15,437	38.0	−23.2
Liberal gain from Labor		Swing	+23.2	

=== Murray-Darling ===
2011 New South Wales state election: Murray-Darling
Party	Candidate	Votes	%	±%
National	John Williams	28,941	74.1	+17.6
Labor	Neville Gasmier	8,096	20.7	−16.3
Greens	Heidi Hendry	2,031	5.2	+2.8
Total formal votes		39,068	97.3	−0.6
Informal votes		1,073	2.6	+0.6
Turnout		40,141	87.5	
Two-party-preferred result
National	John Williams	29,466	77.2	+17.1
Labor	Neville Gasmier	8,684	22.8	−17.1
National hold		Swing	+17.1	

=== Murrumbidgee ===
2011 New South Wales state election: Murrumbidgee
Party	Candidate	Votes	%	±%
National	Adrian Piccoli	31,414	73.4	+10.2
Labor	William Wood	8,431	19.7	−12.2
Greens	George Benedyka	1,577	3.7	−1.2
Christian Democrats	Fiona Bushby	1,362	3.2	+3.2
Total formal votes		42,784	97.6	−0.2
Informal votes		1,070	2.4	+0.2
Turnout		43,854	92.1	
Two-party-preferred result
National	Adrian Piccoli	32,260	77.9	+11.8
Labor	William Wood	9,149	22.1	−11.8
National hold		Swing	+11.8	

=== Myall Lakes ===
2011 New South Wales state election: Myall Lakes
Party	Candidate	Votes	%	±%
National	Stephen Bromhead	29,679	64.6	+15.4
Independent	Steve Attkins	6,186	13.5	+13.5
Labor	David Petroulakis	5,904	12.8	−7.5
Greens	Greg Smith	3,084	6.7	+0.7
Independent	Barry Wright	1,116	2.4	+2.4
Total formal votes		45,969	97.4	−0.7
Informal votes		1,230	2.6	+0.7
Turnout		47,199	93.5	
Notional two-party-preferred count
National	Stephen Bromhead	31,658	78.6	+11.2
Labor	David Petroulakis	8,629	21.4	−11.2
Two-candidate-preferred result
National	Stephen Bromhead	30,821	74.9	+7.5
Independent	Steve Attkins	10,311	25.1	+25.1
National hold		Swing	+7.5	

=== Newcastle ===
2011 New South Wales state election: Newcastle
Party	Candidate	Votes	%	±%
Liberal	Tim Owen	16,072	36.7	+26.9
Labor	Jodi McKay	13,417	30.6	−0.6
Greens	John Sutton	6,510	14.9	+3.6
Independent	John Tate	5,067	11.6	−12.5
Progressive Labour	Rod Noble	1,372	3.1	+3.1
Socialist Alliance	Zane Alcorn	700	1.6	+1.6
Christian Democrats	Milton Caine	496	1.1	−0.1
Socialist Equality	Noel Holt	189	0.4	+0.2
Total formal votes		43,823	97.2	−0.4
Informal votes		1,264	2.8	+0.4
Turnout		45,087	92.4	+1.4
Two-party-preferred result
Liberal	Tim Owen	19,337	52.6	+52.6
Labor	Jodi McKay	17,459	47.4	−3.8
Liberal gain from Labor		Swing	N/A	

=== North Shore ===
2011 New South Wales state election: North Shore
Party	Candidate	Votes	%	±%
Liberal	Jillian Skinner	30,424	67.3	+13.9
Greens	Andrew Robjohns	9,143	20.2	+2.3
Labor	Tabitha Winton	4,881	10.8	−7.0
Christian Democrats	David Kelly	766	1.7	+0.0
Total formal votes		45,214	98.0	+0.2
Informal votes		905	2.0	−0.2
Turnout		46,119	89.5	+0.5
Notional two-party-preferred count
Liberal	Jillian Skinner	32,416	80.3	+11.1
Labor	Tabitha Winton	7,939	19.7	−11.1
Two-candidate-preferred result
Liberal	Jillian Skinner	31,305	73.2	+7.4
Greens	Andrew Robjohns	11,460	26.8	−7.4
Liberal hold		Swing	+7.4	

=== Northern Tablelands ===
2011 New South Wales state election: Northern Tablelands
Party	Candidate	Votes	%	±%
Independent	Richard Torbay	29,526	63.4	−9.3
National	Charlie McCowen	13,199	28.3	+10.6
Labor	Sarah Frazier	1,580	3.4	−0.9
Greens	Pat Schultz	1,531	3.3	+0.1
Christian Democrats	Isabel Strutt	736	1.6	−0.4
Total formal votes		46,572	98.8	−0.2
Informal votes		547	1.2	+0.2
Turnout		47,119	93.2	
Notional two-party-preferred count
National	Charlie McCowen	21,383	76.1	+7.3
Labor	Sarah Frazier	6,726	23.9	−7.3
Two-candidate-preferred result
Independent	Richard Torbay	31,247	69.4	−10.8
National	Charlie McCowen	13,756	30.6	+10.8
Independent hold		Swing	−10.8	

=== Oatley ===
2011 New South Wales state election: Oatley
Party	Candidate	Votes	%	±%
Liberal	Mark Coure	19,587	44.1	+15.4
Labor	Kevin Greene	18,715	42.1	−10.3
Greens	Anne Wagstaff	3,970	8.9	+4.5
Christian Democrats	Steven Marcos	2,146	4.8	+0.6
Total formal votes		44,418	96.8	−0.6
Informal votes		1,474	3.2	+0.6
Turnout		45,892	93.7	
Two-party-preferred result
Liberal	Mark Coure	20,821	50.5	+14.9
Labor	Kevin Greene	20,381	49.5	−14.9
Liberal gain from Labor		Swing	+14.9	

=== Orange ===
2011 New South Wales state election: Orange
Party	Candidate	Votes	%	±%
National	Andrew Gee	25,656	56.7	+6.1
Independent	John Davis	7,261	16.0	−7.6
Labor	Kevin Duffy	6,818	15.1	−5.5
Family First	Fiona Rossiter	3,014	6.7	+6.7
Greens	Stephen Nugent	2,538	5.6	+0.3
Total formal votes		45,287	97.5	−0.6
Informal votes		1,177	2.5	+0.6
Turnout		46,464	94.2	
Notional two-party-preferred count
National	Andrew Gee	28,664	74.2	+7.0
Labor	Kevin Duffy	9,953	25.8	−7.0
Two-candidate-preferred result
National	Andrew Gee	28,288	71.9	+10.2
Independent	John Davis	11,054	28.1	−10.2
National hold		Swing	+10.2	

=== Oxley ===
2011 New South Wales state election: Oxley
Party	Candidate	Votes	%	±%
National	Andrew Stoner	29,412	66.9	+7.8
Greens	Jeremy Bradley	5,506	12.5	+1.8
Labor	Joe Blackshield	5,425	12.3	−12.6
Hatton's Independent Team	Richard McGovern	2,251	5.1	+5.1
Christian Democrats	John Klose	779	1.8	+1.8
Independent	Marcus Aussie-Stone	594	1.4	+1.4
Total formal votes		43,967	97.7	−0.1
Informal votes		1,038	2.3	+0.1
Turnout		45,005	92.2	
Notional two-party-preferred count
National	Andrew Stoner	30,851	79.1	+13.2
Labor	Joe Blackshield	8,162	20.9	−13.2
Two-candidate-preferred result
National	Andrew Stoner	30,994	78.8	+12.8
Greens	Jeremy Bradley	8,358	21.2	+21.2
National hold		Swing	+12.8	

=== Parramatta ===
2011 New South Wales state election: Parramatta
Party	Candidate	Votes	%	±%
Liberal	Geoff Lee	21,673	48.4	+19.6
Labor	Pierre Esber	12,425	27.7	−23.6
Greens	Phil Bradley	3,806	8.5	+1.8
Hatton's Independent Team	Michael McDermott	3,282	7.3	+7.3
Christian Democrats	Peter Magee	1,674	3.7	−1.7
Socialist Alliance	Duncan Roden	706	1.6	+1.6
Family First	Thomas Katsoulas	622	1.4	+1.4
Independent	Kon Paraskevopoulos	438	1.0	+1.0
Communist League	Robert Aiken	152	0.3	+0.3
Total formal votes		44,778	96.2	−0.7
Informal votes		1,753	3.8	+0.7
Turnout		46,531	90.7	
Two-party-preferred result
Liberal	Geoff Lee	23,669	62.1	+25.8
Labor	Pierre Esber	14,464	37.9	−25.8
Liberal gain from Labor		Swing	+25.8	

=== Penrith ===
2011 New South Wales state election: Penrith
Party	Candidate	Votes	%	±%
Liberal	Stuart Ayres	23,074	54.0	+21.4
Labor	John Thain	10,832	25.3	−23.3
Greens	Suzie Wright	4,232	9.9	+4.3
Christian Democrats	Andrew Green	2,474	5.8	−0.4
Outdoor Recreation	Joaquim De Lima	2,119	5.0	+5.0
Total formal votes		42,731	96.4	−0.9
Informal votes		1,589	3.6	+0.9
Turnout		44,320	93.9	
Two-party-preferred result
Liberal	Stuart Ayres	25,023	66.3	+25.6
Labor	John Thain	12,704	33.7	−25.6
Liberal gain from Labor		Swing	+25.6	

=== Pittwater ===
2011 New South Wales state election: Pittwater
Party	Candidate	Votes	%	±%
Liberal	Rob Stokes	32,225	72.0	+21.7
Greens	Jonathan King	7,536	16.8	+7.1
Labor	Pat Boydell	4,023	9.0	+1.6
Christian Democrats	Mark McFarlane	986	2.2	−1.1
Total formal votes		44,770	97.7	−0.1
Informal votes		1,048	2.3	+0.1
Turnout		45,818	92.8	
Notional two-party-preferred count
Liberal	Rob Stokes	34,060	84.5	+4.7
Labor	Pat Boydell	6,244	15.5	−4.7
Two-candidate-preferred result
Liberal	Rob Stokes	33,180	78.0	+18.6
Greens	Jonathan King	9,366	22.0	+22.0
Liberal hold		Swing	+18.6	

=== Port Macquarie ===
2011 New South Wales state election: Port Macquarie
Party	Candidate	Votes	%	±%
National	Leslie Williams	23,718	52.2	+32.7
Independent	Peter Besseling	16,601	36.5	−30.6
Labor	Peter Alley	2,573	5.7	−3.5
Greens	Drusi Megget	1,651	3.6	+0.9
Christian Democrats	Robert Waldron	937	2.1	+2.1
Total formal votes		45,480	98.1	−0.7
Informal votes		889	1.9	+0.7
Turnout		46,369	93.8	
Notional two-party-preferred count
National	Leslie Williams	26,830	78.7	+15.8
Labor	Peter Alley	7,242	21.3	−15.8
Two-candidate-preferred result
National	Leslie Williams	24,378	56.5	+34.7
Independent	Peter Besseling	18,774	43.5	−34.7
National gain from Independent		Swing	+34.7	

=== Port Stephens ===
2011 New South Wales state election: Port Stephens
Party	Candidate	Votes	%	±%
Liberal	Craig Baumann	22,956	51.1	+8.6
Labor	Kate Washington	12,781	28.5	−13.2
Greens	Liz Stephens	4,062	9.0	+3.0
Fishing Party	Paul Hennelly	3,002	6.7	+2.0
Christian Democrats	Julian Grayson	1,083	2.4	−0.5
Family First	Christopher Stokes	1,018	2.3	+2.3
Total formal votes		44,902	97.1	−0.1
Informal votes		1,349	2.9	+0.1
Turnout		46,251	93.4	+0.1
Two-party-preferred result
Liberal	Craig Baumann	24,561	62.4	+12.4
Labor	Kate Washington	14,770	37.6	−12.4
Liberal hold		Swing	+12.4	

=== Riverstone ===
2011 New South Wales state election: Riverstone
Party	Candidate	Votes	%	±%
Liberal	Kevin Conolly	29,971	58.1	+22.9
Labor	Michael Vassili	12,013	23.3	−30.4
Greens	Jess Harwood	2,943	5.7	+1.4
Christian Democrats	Allan Green	2,178	4.2	+4.2
Family First	Jason Cornelius	1,701	3.3	+3.3
Independent	Rosarie Bonham	1,445	2.8	+2.8
Independent	Geno Belcastro	791	1.5	+1.5
Independent Australia First	Tony Pettitt	585	1.1	-2.5
Total formal votes		51,627	96.0	−1.0
Informal votes		2,127	4.0	+1.0
Turnout		53,754	93.6	
Two-party-preferred result
Liberal	Kevin Conolly	31,888	70.2	+30.2
Labor	Michael Vassili	13,555	29.8	−30.2
Liberal gain from Labor		Swing	+30.2	

=== Rockdale ===
2011 New South Wales state election: Rockdale
Party	Candidate	Votes	%	±%
Liberal	John Flowers	19,072	43.3	+9.9
Labor	Steve Kamper	15,990	36.3	−14.0
Greens	Lauren Moore	3,877	8.8	+1.2
Independent	Michael Nagi	3,274	7.4	+7.4
Christian Democrats	Anita Strezova	1,881	4.3	+4.3
Total formal votes		44,094	96.2	+0.4
Informal votes		1,757	3.8	−0.4
Turnout		45,851	92.7	
Two-party-preferred result
Liberal	John Flowers	20,546	53.6	+13.9
Labor	Steve Kamper	17,805	46.4	−13.9
Liberal gain from Labor		Swing	+13.9	

=== Ryde ===
2011 New South Wales state election: Ryde
Party	Candidate	Votes	%	±%
Liberal	Victor Dominello	27,247	62.8	+34.2
Labor	Jerome Laxale	7,374	17.0	−27.8
Greens	Jimmy Shaw	3,969	9.1	+1.3
Independent	Vic Tagg	3,043	7.0	+7.0
Christian Democrats	Julie Worsley	1,774	4.1	+0.4
Total formal votes		43,407	97.2	−0.2
Informal votes		1,236	2.8	+0.2
Turnout		44,643	92.7	
Two-party-preferred result
Liberal	Victor Dominello	29,578	75.7	+35.8
Labor	Jerome Laxale	9,498	24.3	−35.8
Liberal hold		Swing	+12.7	

=== Shellharbour ===
2011 New South Wales state election: Shellharbour
Party	Candidate	Votes	%	±%
Labor	Anna Watson	20,459	46.7	−11.1
Liberal	Larissa Mallinson	13,766	31.4	+16.7
Greens	Peter Moran	6,700	15.3	+7.7
Christian Democrats	Jeff Dakers	2,880	6.6	+6.6
Total formal votes		43,805	95.3	−1.4
Informal votes		2,160	4.7	+1.4
Turnout		45,965	93.4	
Two-party-preferred result
Labor	Anna Watson	22,737	58.6	−13.0
Liberal	Larissa Mallinson	16,050	41.4	+41.4
Labor hold		Swing	−13.0	

=== Smithfield ===
2011 New South Wales state election: Smithfield
Party	Candidate	Votes	%	±%
Liberal	Andrew Rohan	21,443	46.3	+18.8
Labor	Ninos Khoshaba	17,323	37.4	−14.9
Greens	Astrid O'Neill	3,818	8.3	+0.1
Christian Democrats	Manny Poularas	3,680	8.0	+2.5
Total formal votes		46,264	94.6	−0.7
Informal votes		2,661	5.4	+0.7
Turnout		48,925	94.5	
Two-party-preferred result
Liberal	Andrew Rohan	23,009	54.8	+20.3
Labor	Ninos Khoshaba	18,948	45.2	−20.3
Liberal gain from Labor		Swing	+20.3	

=== South Coast ===
2011 New South Wales state election: South Coast
Party	Candidate	Votes	%	±%
Liberal	Shelley Hancock	27,580	60.3	+11.2
Labor	Glenn Sims	10,225	22.3	−10.6
Greens	Amanda Findley	5,888	12.9	+3.6
Christian Democrats	Bohdan Brumerskyj	2,059	4.5	−1.8
Total formal votes		45,752	97.0	−0.9
Informal votes		1,399	3.0	+0.9
Turnout		47,151	92.9	
Two-party-preferred result
Liberal	Shelley Hancock	29,347	70.4	+12.6
Labor	Glenn Sims	12,342	29.6	−12.6
Liberal hold		Swing	+12.6	

=== Strathfield ===
2011 New South Wales state election: Strathfield
Party	Candidate	Votes	%	±%
Liberal	Charles Casuscelli	20,001	45.6	+16.3
Labor	Virginia Judge	15,581	35.6	−16.6
Greens	Lance Dale	5,805	13.2	+3.9
Christian Democrats	Bill Shailer	1,268	2.9	−0.4
Independent	Mark Sharma	1,173	2.7	+2.7
Total formal votes		43,828	97.3	0.0
Informal votes		1,209	2.7	0.0
Turnout		45,037	91.8	
Two-party-preferred result
Liberal	Charles Casuscelli	21,487	54.4	+19.5
Labor	Virginia Judge	18,014	45.6	−19.5
Liberal gain from Labor		Swing	+19.5	

=== Swansea ===
2011 New South Wales state election: Swansea
Party	Candidate	Votes	%	±%
Liberal	Garry Edwards	17,283	37.7	+14.0
Labor	Robert Coombs	16,133	35.2	−10.7
Independent	Gillian Sneddon	7,408	16.2	+16.2
Greens	Phillipa Parsons	3,845	8.4	−0.2
Christian Democrats	Noreen Tibbey	1,130	2.5	−0.8
Total formal votes		45,799	96.9	−0.2
Informal votes		1,476	3.1	+0.2
Turnout		47,275	94.3	
Two-party-preferred result
Liberal	Garry Edwards	19,805	51.1	+11.9
Labor	Robert Coombs	18,928	48.9	−11.9
Liberal gain from Labor		Swing	+11.9	

=== Sydney ===
2011 New South Wales state election: Sydney
Party	Candidate	Votes	%	±%
Independent	Clover Moore	16,909	36.3	−3.3
Liberal	Adrian Bartels	16,855	36.2	+14.6
Greens	De Brierley Newton	5,961	12.8	−2.8
Labor	Sacha Blumen	5,247	11.3	−8.7
Sex Party	Andrew Patterson	676	1.5	+1.5
Christian Democrats	Peter Madden	508	1.1	+1.1
Fishing Party	Victor Shen	464	1.0	+1.0
Total formal votes		46,620	97.8	0.0
Informal votes		1,040	2.2	0.0
Turnout		47,660	83.9	
Notional two-party-preferred count
Liberal	Adrian Bartels	20,843	65.5	+22.4
Labor	Sacha Blumen	10,970	34.5	−22.4
Two-candidate-preferred result
Independent	Clover Moore	20,651	53.1	−13.5
Liberal	Adrian Bartels	18,220	46.9	+46.9
Independent hold		Swing	−13.5	

=== Tamworth ===
2011 New South Wales state election: Tamworth
Party	Candidate	Votes	%	±%
National	Kevin Anderson	25,235	55.0	+14.7
Independent	Peter Draper	17,237	37.6	−8.7
Labor	Paul Hobbs	2,167	4.7	−3.9
Greens	Dheera Smith	722	1.6	+0.4
Independent	Tony Gibson	510	1.1	+1.1
Total formal votes		45,871	98.5	−0.3
Informal votes		699	1.5	+0.3
Turnout		46,570	94.6	
Notional two-party-preferred count
National	Kevin Anderson	30,688	80.6	+5.7
Labor	Paul Hobbs	7,388	19.4	−5.7
Two-candidate-preferred result
National	Kevin Anderson	25,680	57.8	+12.5
Independent	Peter Draper	18,786	42.2	−12.5
National gain from Independent		Swing	+12.5	

=== Terrigal ===
2011 New South Wales state election: Terrigal
Party	Candidate	Votes	%	±%
Liberal	Chris Hartcher	26,737	61.0	+11.1
Labor	Trevor Drake	7,790	17.8	−16.2
Greens	Dougal Anderson	5,927	13.5	+4.9
United We Stand	Michelle Meares	1,414	3.2	+3.2
Christian Democrats	Carmen Darley-Bentley	1,289	2.9	−0.1
Independent	Ian Sutton	698	1.6	+1.6
Total formal votes		43,855	97.3	−0.5
Informal votes		1,223	2.7	+0.5
Turnout		45,078	92.7	
Two-party-preferred result
Liberal	Chris Hartcher	28,433	74.1	+15.7
Labor	Trevor Drake	9,913	25.9	−15.7
Liberal hold		Swing	+15.7	

=== The Entrance ===
2011 New South Wales state election: The Entrance
Party	Candidate	Votes	%	±%
Liberal	Chris Spence	22,898	50.9	+11.1
Labor	David Mehan	13,057	29.0	−18.5
Greens	Deidrie Jinks	4,877	10.8	+2.0
Christian Democrats	Bob Mirovic	2,083	4.6	+4.6
Family First	James Bond	2,082	4.6	+4.6
Total formal votes		44,997	96.5	−0.9
Informal votes		1,633	3.5	+0.9
Turnout		46,630	93.4	
Two-party-preferred result
Liberal	Chris Spence	24,760	62.5	+17.3
Labor	David Mehan	14,880	37.5	−17.3
Liberal gain from Labor		Swing	+17.3	

=== Toongabbie ===
2011 New South Wales state election: Toongabbie
Party	Candidate	Votes	%	±%
Labor	Nathan Rees	18,340	41.2	−10.5
Liberal	Kirsty Lloyd	17,889	40.2	+12.6
Greens	Len Hobbs	2,367	5.3	−1.5
Shooters and Fishers	Peter Johnson	2,346	5.3	+5.3
Christian Democrats	Brendon Prentice	2,016	4.5	−3.4
Independent	Michele Read	942	2.1	+2.1
Independent	Ashok Kumar	624	1.4	+1.4
Total formal votes		44,524	96.4	+0.4
Informal votes		1,671	3.6	−0.4
Turnout		46,195	93.9	−2.0
Two-party-preferred result
Labor	Nathan Rees	19,989	50.3	−14.2
Liberal	Kirsty Lloyd	19,784	49.7	+14.2
Labor hold		Swing	−14.2	

=== Tweed ===
2011 New South Wales state election: Tweed
Party	Candidate	Votes	%	±%
National	Geoff Provest	25,416	62.1	+15.9
Labor	Reece Byrnes	8,750	21.4	−17.2
Greens	Andrea Vickers	5,748	14.0	+6.3
Christian Democrats	Corinne Pennay	1,021	2.5	+2.5
Total formal votes		40,935	96.7	−1.0
Informal votes		1,395	3.3	+1.0
Turnout		42,330	86.6	
Two-party-preferred result
National	Geoff Provest	26,389	71.7	+18.7
Labor	Reece Byrnes	10,432	28.3	−18.7
National hold		Swing	+18.7	

=== Upper Hunter ===
2011 New South Wales state election: Upper Hunter
Party	Candidate	Votes	%	±%
National	George Souris	24,555	54.7	−5.5
Independent	Tim Duddy	8,653	19.3	+19.3
Labor	Michael Gibbons	8,047	17.9	−13.4
Greens	Chris Parker	2,563	5.7	−2.8
Christian Democrats	Fred Cowley	1,109	2.5	+2.5
Total formal votes		44,927	97.2	−0.7
Informal votes		1,276	2.8	+0.7
Turnout		46,203	93.7	
Notional two-party-preferred count
National	George Souris	27,723	73.3	+8.6
Labor	Michael Gibbons	10,087	26.7	−8.6
Two-candidate-preferred result
National	George Souris	26,179	68.3	+3.5
Independent	Tim Duddy	12,161	31.7	+31.7
National hold		Swing	+3.5	

=== Vaucluse ===
2011 New South Wales state election: Vaucluse
Party	Candidate	Votes	%	±%
Liberal	Gabrielle Upton	30,187	69.8	+9.9
Greens	Susan Jarnason	7,879	18.2	−2.2
Labor	Pauline Neill	4,645	10.7	−8.9
Christian Democrats	Beresford Thomas	549	1.3	+1.3
Total formal votes		43,260	97.4	+0.2
Informal votes		1,134	2.6	−0.2
Turnout		44,394	87.8	
Notional two-party-preferred count
Liberal	Gabrielle Upton	31,564	81.4	+13.5
Labor	Pauline Neill	7,215	18.6	–13.5
Two-candidate-preferred result
Liberal	Gabrielle Upton	30,895	76.1	+10.0
Greens	Susan Jarnason	9,714	23.9	−10.0
Liberal hold		Swing	+10.0	

=== Wagga Wagga ===
2011 New South Wales state election: Wagga Wagga
Party	Candidate	Votes	%	±%
Liberal	Daryl Maguire	24,393	53.5	−5.5
Hatton's Independent Team	Joe McGirr	13,960	30.6	+30.6
Labor	Glenn Elliott-Rudder	4,609	10.1	−22.4
Greens	Ros Prangnell	1,527	3.4	−5.0
Christian Democrats	Sylvia Mulholland	1,070	2.3	+2.3
Total formal votes		45,559	97.8	−0.1
Informal votes		1,028	2.2	+0.1
Turnout		46,587	92.3	
Notional two-party-preferred count
Liberal	Daryl Maguire	28,628	77.8	+14.8
Labor	Glenn Elliott-Rudder	8,172	22.2	−14.8
Two-candidate-preferred result
Liberal	Daryl Maguire	25,542	60.3	−2.8
Hatton's Independent Team	Joe McGirr	16,823	39.7	+39.7
Liberal hold		Swing	−2.8	

=== Wakehurst ===
2011 New South Wales state election: Wakehurst
Party	Candidate	Votes	%	±%
Liberal	Brad Hazzard	31,634	69.4	+12.5
Greens	Conny Harris	6,717	14.7	+2.1
Labor	Linda Beattie	5,930	13.0	−10.9
Christian Democrats	Peter Colsell	1,271	2.8	+2.8
Total formal votes		45,552	96.9	0.0
Informal votes		1,466	3.1	0.0
Turnout		47,018	92.9	
Notional two-party-preferred count
Liberal	Brad Hazzard	33,210	80.5	+13.2
Labor	Linda Beattie	8,021	19.5	−13.2
Two-candidate-preferred result
Liberal	Brad Hazzard	32,811	78.5	+11.2
Greens	Conny Harris	8,969	21.5	+21.5
Liberal hold		Swing	+11.2	

=== Wallsend ===
2011 New South Wales state election: Wallsend
Party	Candidate	Votes	%	±%
Labor	Sonia Hornery	17,275	39.6	−11.5
Liberal	Chris Dolan	12,862	29.5	+4.1
Independent	Shayne Connell	6,147	14.1	+14.1
Greens	Keith Parsons	3,617	8.3	−3.9
Independent	Michael Jackson	2,013	4.6	+4.6
Christian Democrats	Andrew Weatherstone	877	2.0	−2.7
Family First	Ray Broderick	864	2.0	+2.0
Total formal votes		43,655	96.4	−0.4
Informal votes		1,620	3.6	+0.4
Turnout		45,275	94.1	
Two-party-preferred result
Labor	Sonia Hornery	20,314	56.6	−9.2
Liberal	Chris Dolan	15,574	43.4	+9.2
Labor hold		Swing	−9.2	

=== Willoughby ===
2011 New South Wales state election: Willoughby
Party	Candidate	Votes	%	±%
Liberal	Gladys Berejiklian	30,644	69.4	+19.2
Greens	Robert McDougall	7,260	16.4	+5.3
Labor	Chris Simpson	5,287	12.0	−3.2
Christian Democrats	Philip Brown	958	2.2	+0.5
Total formal votes		44,149	97.6	−0.1
Informal votes		1,108	2.4	+0.1
Turnout		45,257	90.7	+0.1
Notional two-party-preferred count
Liberal	Gladys Berejiklian	32,397	80.8	+9.8
Labor	Chris Simpson	7,723	19.2	−9.8
Two-candidate-preferred result
Liberal	Gladys Berejiklian	31,709	78.1	+13.6
Greens	Robert McDougall	8,883	21.9	+21.9
Liberal hold		Swing	+13.6	

=== Wollondilly ===
2011 New South Wales state election: Wollondilly
Party	Candidate	Votes	%	±%
Liberal	Jai Rowell	22,632	49.9	+10.6
Labor	Phil Costa	11,558	25.5	−18.8
Hatton's Independent Team	Judy Hannan	4,971	11.0	+11.0
Greens	Jess Di Blasio	2,432	5.4	−1.6
Outdoor Recreation	Clinton Mead	2,104	4.6	+4.6
Christian Democrats	Chris Dalton	1,669	3.7	+3.7
Total formal votes		45,366	95.4	−1.0
Informal votes		2,183	4.6	+1.0
Turnout		47,549	94.5	
Two-party-preferred result
Liberal	Jai Rowell	24,861	64.7	+18.0
Labor	Phil Costa	13,559	35.3	−18.0
Liberal gain from Labor		Swing	+18.0	

=== Wollongong ===
2011 New South Wales state election: Wollongong
Party	Candidate	Votes	%	±%
Labor	Noreen Hay	16,060	35.6	−22.7
Independent	Gordon Bradbery	13,299	29.5	+29.5
Liberal	Michelle Blicavs	9,124	20.2	+3.5
Greens	Brendan Cook	4,315	9.6	−0.2
Independent	Jim Clabour	1,143	2.5	+2.5
Christian Democrats	Clarrie Pratt	1,127	2.5	−3.1
Total formal votes		45,068	96.3	0.0
Informal votes		1,752	3.7	0.0
Turnout		46,820	92.7	
Notional two-party-preferred count
Labor	Noreen Hay	19,656	58.9	−16.4
Liberal	Michelle Blicavs	13,717	41.1	+16.4
Two-candidate-preferred result
Labor	Noreen Hay	18,085	50.9	−24.3
Independent	Gordon Bradbery	17,411	49.1	+49.1
Labor hold		Swing	−24.3	

=== Wyong ===
2011 New South Wales state election: Wyong
Party	Candidate	Votes	%	±%
Liberal	Darren Webber	20,665	45.9	+14.3
Labor	David Harris	18,038	40.1	−2.5
Greens	Sue Wynn	4,894	10.9	+5.8
Christian Democrats	Roger Fernandez	1,444	3.2	+0.5
Total formal votes		45,031	96.1	−1.2
Informal votes		1,851	3.9	+1.2
Turnout		46,882	93.1	
Two-party-preferred result
Liberal	Darren Webber	21,771	52.6	+9.5
Labor	David Harris	19,619	47.4	−9.5
Liberal gain from Labor		Swing	+9.5	

== See also ==
- Candidates of the 2011 New South Wales state election
- Members of the New South Wales Legislative Assembly, 2011–2015
