= 1972 Charlestown state by-election =

Election result for Charlestown, New South Wales, Australia

A by-election was held for the New South Wales Legislative Assembly seat of Charlestown on Saturday 18 November 1972. It was triggered by the death of Jack Stewart (Labor).

== Dates ==
Date	Event
19 September 1972	Jack Stewart died.
20 October 1972	Writ of election issued by the Speaker of the Legislative Assembly.
27 October 1972	Nominations
18 November 1972	Polling day
5 December 1972	Return of writ

== Results ==
1972 Charlestown by-election Saturday 18 November
Party	Candidate	Votes	%	±%
Labor	Richard Face	15,977	59.9	+5.2
Liberal	Wallace MacDonald	9,474	35.5	−0.9
Independent	Colin Fisher	1,217	4.6	
Total formal votes		26,668	98.4	−0.1
Informal votes		446	1.6	+0.13
Turnout		27,114	88.6	−6.0
Labor hold		Swing	+5.2	

== See also ==
- Electoral results for the district of Charlestown
- List of New South Wales state by-elections
