= John Stuart Tate =

Australian politician

John Tate

Lord Mayor of Newcastle
- In office 11 September 1999 – 8 September 2012
- Deputy: Mike Jackson
- Preceded by: Greg Heys
- Succeeded by: Jeff McCloy

Personal details
- Born: John Stuart Tate
- Spouse: Cathy Tate

John Stuart Tate is an Australian politician who served as the Lord Mayor of Newcastle from 2009 until 2012.

Tate was first elected as a councillor of the City of Newcastle in September 1980.

Tate ran as an independent candidate for the electoral district of Newcastle in the 2007 state election but narrowly lost to Labor candidate Jodi McKay, a former NBN Television reporter.

Tate re-contested the Lord Mayoral position at the 2008 New South Wales local elections as an independent candidate, outpolling his rivals with 32% compared to independent Aaron Buman with 18.6% and Labor candidate Marilyn Eade with 18.4%.

Tate contested the electorate of Newcastle again at the 2011 New South Wales election. He came fourth, with Tim Owen from the Liberal Party winning the seat.

Responding to revelations in May 2014 at the Independent Commission Against Corruption about the possibly corrupt funding of election campaigns in the electorate of Newcastle in 2011, by businesses associated with Nathan Tinkler, Tate said he had never received any financial assistance from Tinkler or any entity connected with him.

Civic offices
Preceded by Greg Heys	Lord Mayor of Newcastle; 1999–2012	Succeeded by Jeff McCloy
