= 2014 Newcastle state by-election =

Election result for Newcastle, New South Wales, Australia

- 25 October 2014

Electoral district of Newcastle in the New South Wales Legislative Assembly

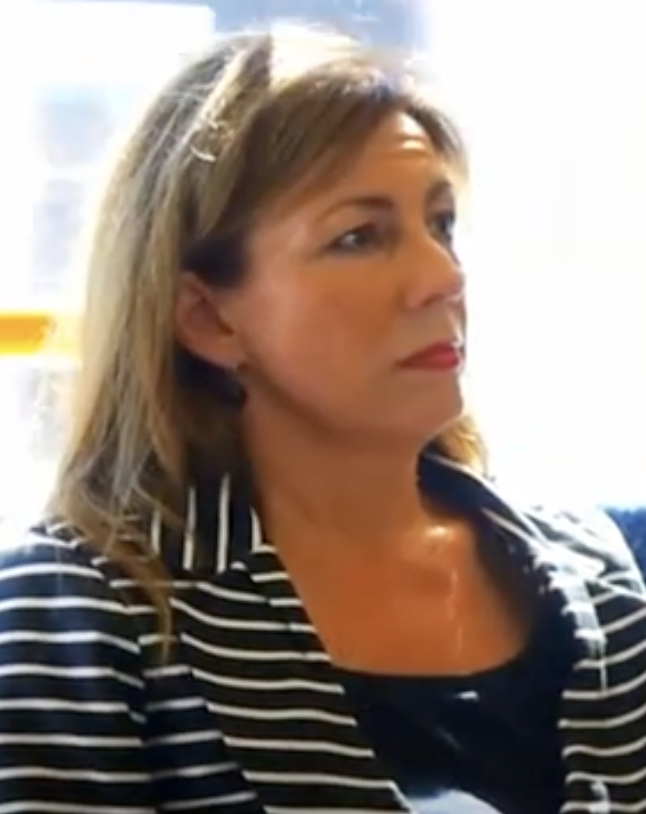

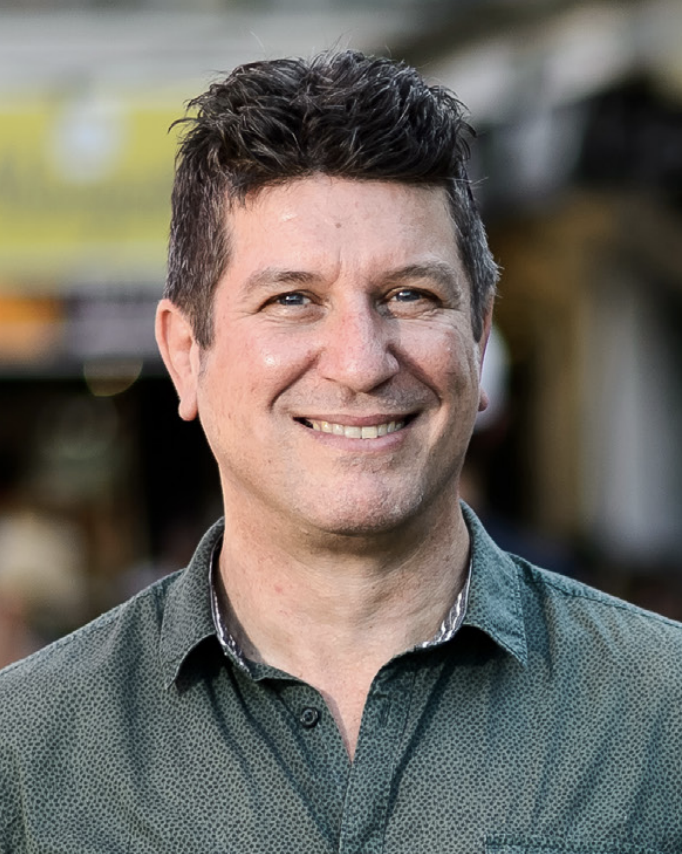
	First party	Second party	Third party
Candidate	Tim Crakanthorp	Karen Howard	Michael Osborne
Party	Labor	Independent	Greens
Primary vote	15,253	10,796	8,236
Percentage	36.9%	26.1%	19.9%
Swing	▲6.3pp	▲26.1pp	▲5.1pp
2PP	58.7%	41.3%
2PP swing	▲11.3pp	▼11.3pp
MP before election
Tim Owen
Independent
Elected MP
Tim Crakanthorp
Labor

The 2014 Newcastle state by-election was held 25 October 2014 to elect the member for Newcastle in the New South Wales Legislative Assembly. The by-election was triggered by the resignation of Liberal-turned-independent MP Tim Owen, who won the seat at the 2011 election with a 36.7 percent primary and 52.6 percent two-party-preferred vote.

The previous New South Wales by-election had seen a 26-point two-party-preferred swing to Labor.

== Background ==
Newcastle, located in the traditional Labor heartland of the Hunter Region, was won for the Liberals by Owen at the 2011 election on a swing of 26.9 points. Owen was the first Liberal to win the seat since its re-creation in 1927. Before Owen's win, Newcastle had only been out of Labor hands twice in its current incarnation; independent George Keegan held it from 1988 to 1991, and Bryce Gaudry sat as an independent for part of 2007 after losing Labor preselection.

In May 2014, after admitting that he had probably received illegal donations in the 2011 campaign, Owen announced he would not re-nominate for Newcastle in the next state election. On 6 August 2014, the New South Wales Independent Commission Against Corruption heard evidence that illegal donations from Newcastle-area developers had funded Owen's campaign, prompting the commission's counsel to question the validity of Owen's victory. Following this disclosure, Owen resigned from the Liberal Party to sit as an independent pending the results of the inquiry. A week later, on 12 August, Owen admitted he had lied to the ICAC about returning one of the illicit donations. He resigned from parliament hours later under pressure.

== Dates ==
Date	Event
3 October 2014	Writ of election issued by the Speaker of the Legislative Assembly and close of electoral rolls.
Noon, 8 October 2014	Close of nominations for party-endorsed candidates
Noon, 9 October 2014	Close of nominations for other candidates
25 October 2014	Polling day, between the hours of 8 am and 6 pm

== Candidates ==
The eight candidates in ballot paper order are as follows:

Candidate nominations
Socialist Alliance	Steve O'Brien	Socialist campaigner and unionist.
Labor Party	Tim Crakanthorp	Newcastle City Council Councillor.
Greens	Michael Osborne	Former Deputy Lord Mayor of Newcastle City Council.
Independent	Jacqueline Haines	Contested Lord Mayoral election in 2012.
Palmer United Party	Jennifer Stefanac	Palmer United Party candidate.
Independent	Karen Howard	Graduate and Fellow of the Australian Institute of Company Directors.
Christian Democratic Party	Milton Caine	Has contested seats for 30 years as a Christian Democrat, Liberal, and independent.
Independent	Brian Buckley Clare	Contested federal seat of Lyne for Katter's Australian Party at previous election.

The Liberals declined to contest the by-election, and also declined to field a candidate in the by-election in Charlestown held on the same day. NSW Liberal director Tony Nutt stated that the Liberals would not contest either by-election "as an explicit act of atonement" for the revelations, and Premier Mike Baird said that the Liberals didn't deserve to contest the seats while they were "getting (their) house in order." According to ABC election analyst Antony Green, it was the first known occasion of a sitting government in NSW opting not to contest by-elections in seats that it previously held.

== Results ==
2014 Newcastle state by-election
Party	Candidate	Votes	%	±%
Labor	Tim Crakanthorp	15,253	36.9	+6.3
Independent	Karen Howard	10,796	26.1	+26.1
Greens	Michael Osborne	8,236	19.9	+5.1
Independent	Jacqueline Haines	3,019	7.3	+7.3
Palmer United	Jennifer Stefanac	1,332	3.2	+3.2
Socialist Alliance	Steve O'Brien	1,086	2.6	+1.0
Christian Democrats	Milton Caine	834	2.0	+1.2
Independent	Brian Buckley Clare	762	1.8	+1.8
Total formal votes		41,318	94.7	−2.5
Informal votes		2,327	5.3	+2.5
Turnout		43,645	80.6	−11.8
Two-candidate-preferred result
Labor	Tim Crakanthorp	18,785	58.7	+11.2
Independent	Karen Howard	13,243	41.3	+41.3
Labor gain from Liberal				

== See also ==
- 2014 Charlestown state by-election
- List of New South Wales state by-elections
