= 2014 Charlestown state by-election =

Election result for Charlestown, New South Wales, Australia

- 25 October 2014
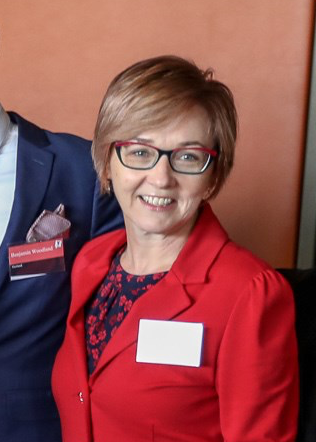

	First party	Second party	Third party
			IND
Candidate	Jodie Harrison	Jane Oakley	Luke Arms
Party	Labor	Greens	Independent
Popular vote	19,429	5,613	4,807
Percentage	49.3%	14.2%	12.2%
Swing	▲20.4	▲5.8	▲12.2
TPP	70.8%	29.2%
TPP swing	▲30.6	▲29.2
MP before election
Andrew Cornwell
Independent
Elected MP
Jodie Harrison
Labor

A by-election for the seat of Charlestown in the New South Wales Legislative Assembly was held on 25 October 2014. The by-election was triggered by the resignation of Liberal-turned-independent MP Andrew Cornwell, who won the seat at the 2011 election with a 43.8 percent primary and 59.9 percent two-party vote.

The last New South Wales by-election saw a 26-point two-party swing to Labor.

== Background ==
Charlestown, located in the traditional Labor heartland of the Hunter Region, was held by Labor without interruption from its creation in 1971 until Cornwell won the seat on a swing of 25.2 points, and 59.9 percent of the two-party preferred vote—on paper, turning it into a safe Liberal seat in one stroke. Cornwell's victory was all the more remarkable since the Liberals hadn't even put up a candidate in the 2007 election.

On 6 August 2014, a hearing of the New South Wales Independent Commission Against Corruption (ICAC) revealed that Cornwell had received $10,000 in illegal donations from Newcastle Lord Mayor Jeff McCloy. Following this revelation, Cornwell resigned from the Liberal Party and moved to the crossbench as an independent pending the result of the inquiry. Cornwell also admitted to the ICAC that his wife had received $10,120 from developer Hilton Grugeon, ostensibly for a painting given to the developer in 2010 which was worth much less. The money was used to pay Cornwell's PAYG tax.

On 8 August 2014, Cornwell announced that would not re-nominate for Charlestown at the next NSW election. Less than a week later, on 12 August, Cornwell announced his immediate resignation.

== Dates ==
Date	Event
3 October 2014	Writ of election issued by the Speaker of the Legislative Assembly and close of electoral rolls.
Noon, 8 October 2014	Close of nominations for party-endorsed candidates
Noon, 9 October 2014	Close of nominations for other candidates
25 October 2014	Polling day, between the hours of 8 am and 6 pm

== Candidates ==
The nine candidates in ballot paper order are as follows:

Candidate nominations
Independent	Luke Arms	IT role at Maitland Christian School, runs a photography business and writes software.
Independent	Marc Sky	Radiographer.
Greens	Jane Oakley	NSW Greens secretary.
Palmer United Party	Suellen Wrightson	Palmer United Party candidate.
Labor Party	Jodie Harrison	Lake Macquarie City Council Mayor.
Independent	Luke Cubis	Former school teacher.
Independent	Arjay Martin	Businessman. Contested seat at previous election.
Christian Democratic Party	Brian Tucker	
Independent	Veronica Hope	Media entrepreneur.

The Liberals declined to contest the by-election, and also declined to field a candidate in the by-election in Newcastle held on the same day. NSW Liberal director Tony Nutt stated that the Liberals would not contest either by-election "as an explicit act of atonement" for the revelations, and Premier Mike Baird said that the Liberals didn't deserve to contest the seats while they were "getting (their) house in order." According to ABC election analyst Antony Green, it was the first known occasion of a sitting government in NSW opting not to contest by-elections in seats that it previously held.

== Results ==
2014 Charlestown by-election Saturday 25 October
Party	Candidate	Votes	%	±%
Labor	Jodie Harrison	19,429	49.3	+20.4
Greens	Jane Oakley	5,613	14.2	+5.8
Independent	Luke Arms	4,807	12.2	+12.2
Palmer United	Suellen Wrightson	2,592	6.6	+6.6
Independent	Veronica Hope	2,144	5.4	+5.4
Christian Democrats	Brian Tucker	1,804	4.6	+2.4
Independent	Luke Cubis	1,366	3.5	+3.5
Independent	Marc Sky	1,068	2.7	+2.7
Independent	Arjay Martin	611	1.5	+1.5
Total formal votes		39,434	92.6	−3.9
Informal votes		3,158	7.4	+3.9
Turnout		42,592	85.4	−9.1
Two-candidate-preferred result
Labor	Jodie Harrison	21,206	70.8	+30.6
Greens	Jane Oakley	8,762	29.2	+29.2
Labor gain from Liberal		Swing	N/A	

== See also ==
- Electoral results for the district of Charlestown
- List of New South Wales state by-elections
