= Richard Face =

Australian politician (1942–2023)

The Honourable Richard Face

NSW Minister for Gaming and Racing and Minister Assisting the Premier on Hunter Development
- In office 4 April 1995 – 20 March 2003
- Premier: Bob Carr

Member of the New South Wales Parliament for Charlestown
- In office 18 November 1972 – 20 March 2003
- Preceded by: Jack Stewart
- Succeeded by: Matthew Morris

Personal details
- Born: Jack Richard Face; 2 December 1942 Merewether, New South Wales, Australia
- Died: 1 August 2023 (aged 80)
- Party: Labor Party
- Spouse: Anita Kryczko (1977–?)
- Domestic partner: Gaye Pear Bryden (2002–2023)
- Occupation: Police officer

Jack Richard Face (2 December 1942 – 1 August 2023) was an Australian politician who was a member of the New South Wales Legislative Assembly between 1972 and 2003.

== Biography ==
Jack Richard Face was born in the Newcastle suburb of Merewether and educated at Merewether Public School, Broadmeadow High School, Newcastle Technical College and the New South Wales Police Academy.

Face was the Labor member for Charlestown from 1972 to 2003. He was the Minister for Gaming and Racing in Bob Carr's cabinet from 1995 until his retirement.

In 2004 he was found guilty of lying to the Independent Commission against Corruption (ICAC). He was fined A$2500 and given a three-year good behaviour bond.

Richard Face died on 1 August 2023, at the age of 80.

New South Wales Legislative Assembly
Preceded by Jack Stewart	Member for Charlestown; 1972–2003	Succeeded by Matthew Morris
