= Matthew Morris (politician) =

New South Wales politician (1969–2020)

Member of the New South Wales Legislative Assembly for Charlestown
- In office 22 March 2003 – 4 March 2011
- Preceded by: Richard Face
- Succeeded by: Andrew Cornwell

Personal details
- Born: Matthew Allan Morris; 15 March 1969 Waratah, New South Wales, Australia
- Died: 28 June 2020 (aged 51)
- Party: Labor Party
- Relations: Peter Morris (father); Allan Morris (uncle); James Morris (son) Madalaine Morris (daughter) Jackson Morris (son) Amelia Morris (daughter)

Matthew Allan Morris (15 March 1969 – 28 June 2020) was an Australian politician, who was elected as a member of the New South Wales Legislative Assembly for the seat of Charlestown representing the Labor Party.

Matthew was the son of Peter Morris, and a nephew of Allan Morris, both politicians. He succeeded Richard Face as the member for Charlestown at the 2003 New South Wales state election. Morris won re-election at the 2007 election with 43.46% of the vote, fending off his closest competitors, independent Paul Scarfe with 24.56% and Liberal Lindsay Paterson with 18.63%. On 26 March 2011, Morris was defeated by Cardiff veterinarian Andrew Cornwell.

This was the first time in electoral history the Liberal Party had held the seat of Charlestown or any Lake Macquarie or Newcastle seats. This was one of 32 seats that the former Labour government lost under the leadership of Kristina Keneally.

On 30 June 2020, it was reported that Morris had died on 28 June from brain cancer, which had been diagnosed earlier that year.

== Notes ==
New South Wales Legislative Assembly
Preceded by Richard Face	Member for Charlestown; 2003–2011	Succeeded by Andrew Cornwell
