= Tim Crakanthorp =

Australian politician

The Honourable Tim Crakanthorp MP

Minister for Skills, TAFE and Tertiary Education
- In office 5 April 2023 – 3 August 2023
- Premier: Chris Minns
- Preceded by: Alister Henskens (as Minister for Skills and Training)
- Succeeded by: Prue Car

Minister for the Hunter
- In office 5 April 2023 – 3 August 2023
- Premier: Chris Minns
- Succeeded by: Yasmin Catley

Member of the New South Wales Legislative Assembly for Newcastle
- Incumbent
- Assumed office 25 October 2014
- Preceded by: Tim Owen

Personal details
- Born: 3 June
- Party: Labor
- Occupation: Politician
- Profession: Public servant
- Website: www.timcrakanthorp.com

Timothy Carson Crakanthorp is an Australian politician. He has been a Labor member of the New South Wales Legislative Assembly since 25 October 2014, when he was elected in a by-election to the seat of Newcastle. Crakanthorp was an elected Councillor on Newcastle City Council for eight years. When he was elected to the Legislative Assembly he was still a serving Councillor on Newcastle City Council.

Crakanthorp was the Minister for Skills, TAFE and Tertiary Education, and the Minister for the Hunter in the NSW Minns ministry. He was asked to resign after three months due to identified undisclosed conflicts of interest.

In June 2024, a teenager was charged with terrorism offences after entering Crakanthorp's office with weapons. The teen had filmed the minister and had made threats.

== Resignation and breach of the public trust ==
On 2 August 2023, the Premier asked Crakanthorp to resign from the Ministry as the Premier had "formed the view that Mr Crakanthorp has failed to comply with his obligations under the Ministerial Code of Conduct to promptly notify me of a potential conflict of interest". Conflicts of interest related to substantial undisclosed property holdings held by Mr Cranakthorp's family.

Media reporting indicated concerns had been raised with the Premier directly on Mr Crakanthorp's failure to disclose conflicts.

The matter was referred to the Independent Commission Against Corruption (ICAC) for investigation admit concerns projects in the Hunter had been potentially tarnished by Mr Crakanthorp's conflict's interest.

On 10 April 2024 ICAC handed its report to the NSW Government, which then released the document. ICAC found Crakanthorp's failure to disclose property holdings "constituted a breach of public trust" as he had "knowingly failed to declare a conflict of interest." The report stated "Mr Crakanthorp was aware of his duty to disclose his conflict and yet failed to do so while he participated in meetings about [conflicted developments]".

As Mr Crakanthorp had resigned as Minister before taking any actions beyond "preliminary acts", the ICAC found Mr Crakanthorp had been unable to have conducted himself at a standard of "corrupt conduct".

New South Wales Legislative Assembly
Preceded by Tim Owen	Member for Newcastle; 2014–present	Incumbent
Political offices
Preceded by Alister Henskens	Minister for Skills, TAFE and Tertiary Education; 2023	Succeeded by Prue Car
New title	Minister for the Hunter; 2023	Succeeded by Yasmin Catley
