= Jodie Harrison =

Australian politician

Jodie Harrison MP
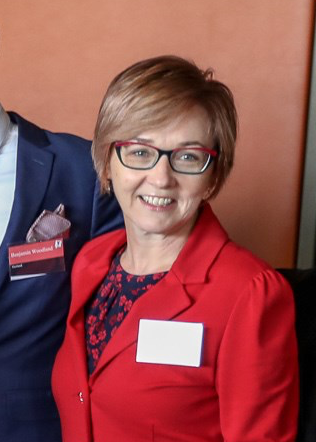

Minister for Women
- Incumbent
- Assumed office 5 April 2023
- Premier: Chris Minns
- Preceded by: Bronnie Taylor

Minister for the Prevention of Domestic Violence and Sexual Assault
- Incumbent
- Assumed office 5 April 2023
- Premier: Chris Minns
- Preceded by: Natalie Ward

Minister for Seniors
- Incumbent
- Assumed office 5 April 2023
- Premier: Chris Minns
- Preceded by: Mark Coure

Member of the New South Wales Legislative Assembly for Charlestown
- Incumbent
- Assumed office 25 October 2014
- Preceded by: Andrew Cornwell

Personal details
- Born: 1968 (age 57–58)
- Party: Labor Party

Jodie Elizabeth Harrison (born 1968) is an Australian politician who has represented the Charlestown Electorate in the New South Wales Legislative Assembly for the Labor Party since 25 October 2014, when she was elected in a by-election.

== Personal life ==
Harrison was born in 1968 and is the eldest child of Clive Harrison and Elizabeth Denning. In 1973 her brother Todd Harrison was born. Harrison spent her formative years growing up in south-western suburbs of Sydney.

Harrison moved to the Lake Macquarie region in the early 1990s after Harrison's parents bought a small business in Lake Macquarie.

== Early career ==
Harrison worked at Newcastle City Council from 1993 until 2007 in various roles encompassing organisational change management, organisational performance and governance. Harrison was the inaugural chairperson of Newcastle City Council's Women's Committee established in the mid-1990s.

Harrison was employed as a Recruitment Officer by the United Services Union (USU) from 2007 to 2011 and during that time was also the USU's Women's Committee Coordinator. As part of this job Harrison was sent to the United States as part of Australian Council of Trade Unions (ACTU) contingent to work with one of the major unions, the Service Employees International Union (SEIU).

In 2011–12 Harrison worked for United Voice (previously known as the Liquor Hospitality and Miscellaneous Workers Union) organising early childhood educators and people in the care sector. Harrison worked to gain better working conditions and professional wages for low-paid workers.

== Political career ==
Harrison was elected as a Councillor to North Ward for Lake Macquarie City Council in 2008.

In 2012 Harrison was popularly elected to Mayor of the City of Lake Macquarie and became the first female to be elected to the position. Harrison served as Mayor until the Lake Macquarie election in September 2016, which she did not recontest.

Harrison has represented the electoral district of Charlestown in the New South Wales Legislative Assembly for the Labor Party since 25 October 2014 when she was elected in a by-election after the resignation of Andrew Cornwell.

Following the 2015 New South Wales state election, Harrison was appointed to the shadow Ministry of Luke Foley in April 2015. She was appointed Shadow Minister for the Hunter, Women, Early Childhood Education and Prevention of Domestic Violence and Sexual Assault. From 2015 until 2023, Harrison was a member of the Parliament of New South Wales Committee on Children and Young People. In January 2016, Harrison resigned from the Shadow Cabinet, having spent nine months in the roles, citing family reasons.

Following the 2019 NSW election, Harrison was returned to the Opposition front bench as Shadow Minister for Early Childhood Learning. After the 2021 New South Wales Labor Party leadership election that installed Chris Minns as leader, Harrison was appointed Shadow Minister for Seniors, Women and the Prevention of Domestic Violence and Sexual Assault.

Harrison was re-elected as the Member for Charlestown at the 2023 election. On 5 April 2023, Harrison was appointed to the Minns ministry as Minister for Women, Minister for Seniors and Minister for Prevention of Domestic Violence and Sexual Assault.

New South Wales Legislative Assembly
Preceded by Andrew Cornwell	Member for Charlestown; 2014–present	Incumbent
Political offices
Preceded by Bronnie Taylor	Minister for Women; 2023–present	Incumbent
Preceded by Natalie Ward	Minister for the Prevention of Domestic Violence and Sexual Assault; 2023–present	Incumbent
Preceded by Mark Coure	Minister for Seniors; 2023–present	Incumbent
