= Tim Owen =

Australian politician (born 1955)

Air Commodore Tim Owen AM
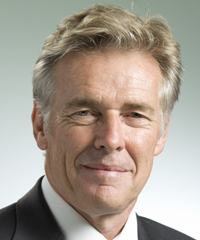

Member of the New South Wales Parliament for Newcastle
- In office 26 March 2011 – 12 August 2014
- Preceded by: Jodi McKay
- Succeeded by: Tim Crakanthorp
- Majority: 2.6% (2011)

Personal details
- Born: Timothy Francis Owen; 29 October 1955 (age 71) Brisbane, Queensland
- Party: Independent (2014)
- Other political affiliations: Liberal (2011–2014)
- Children: 3
- Occupation: Politician

Military service
- Allegiance: Australia
- Branch/service: Royal Australian Air Force
- Years of service: 1977–2008
- Rank: Air Commodore
- Unit: Surveillance and Response Group
- Battles/wars: Iraq War; Afghanistan war

Timothy Francis Owen AM (born 29 October 1955) is a former Australian politician and a former deputy commander of the Australian Forces in Iraq and Afghanistan. He was a member of the New South Wales Legislative Assembly representing the electoral district of Newcastle for the Liberal Party from the 2011 New South Wales state election until 6 August 2014, when he moved to the parliamentary crossbench and sat as an independent, following evidence given to the Independent Commission Against Corruption (ICAC) that he may have breached electoral funding laws.

In May 2014, Owen announced that he would not contest his seat at the next state election. On 12 August 2014, after admitting lying to ICAC, he resigned from parliament, triggering the 2014 Newcastle by-election.

== Air Force career ==
Owen served in the Royal Australian Air Force (RAAF), commencing in 1977, and rising to the rank of Air Commodore and deputy commander of the Australian Forces in Iraq and Afghanistan. During his career in the RAAF he held various ranks and positions, including:

- 1984 Flight commander, No 114 Mobile Control and Reporting Unit
- 1985 Three year exchange with USAF - responsible for Counter Air Tactics and Joint Battle Management courses at Tyndall AFB, completed abbreviated AWACS conversion
- 1990 Completed RAAF Command and Staff College
- 1992 Commander No 2 Control and Reporting Unit in Darwin
- 1995 Chief of staff - Air Defence 41 Wing HQ
- 1998 Joint Air Plans, Strategic Command Division
- 1999 Director of joint plans
- 2000 Commander Surveillance and Control Group at RAAF Williamtown
- 2005 Commander Surveillance and Response Group
- 2007 Director general Strategic Plans Air Force
- 2008/9 Deputy commander Australian Forces Iraq/Afghanistan

In 1978, Owen moved to Williamtown, the site of a large RAAF military base, and has lived in the region, when not on active duty, for 15 years. He completed a Masters in Strategic Studies in 1999. He resigned from the Air Force and the Australian Defence Force in 2009 and became chief executive officer of CI Agent Solutions, a company that provides oil-spill solutions to the defence and aerospace industry sector.

He was married to Charlotte (now divorced).

== Political career ==
In October 2010 Owen joined the Liberal Party and on 11 December 2010 was endorsed as the party's candidate for Newcastle at the 2011 state election. While it was widely reported that Labor's chances were running low in the historically safe seat, it was expected that the Lord Mayor of Newcastle, John Tate, who was running as an independent candidate, was most likely to defeat Jodi McKay, the incumbent Labor member and a minister. Bookies had Owen as an outside chance to win, at odds of $5.25.

However leaked Labor Party internal polling on the eve of the election had Owen's primary support at 30 per cent, with McKay was at 25 per cent, and Tate's vote "collapsing" to 16 per cent. At the election, Owen achieved a swing of 26.9% and won the seat with 52.6% of the vote on a two party preferred basis.

McKay conceded in a statement to the press that "the people have had their say... I accept the decision of the Newcastle community that they do not want me to continue in this role." The seat of Newcastle had been held by the Labor Party for its 84 years of existence as a single member electorate, except being held by an independent between 1988 and 1991.

In May 2014 Owen announced that would not contest his seat at the next NSW election after admitting that prohibited donors had "probably" contributed to his 2011 campaign. On 6 August 2014, the New South Wales Independent Commission Against Corruption (ICAC) revealed evidence that Owen's campaign had received illegal funding from Newcastle developers. That evidence had been provided by Owen's campaign manager, who revealed the illicit donation scheme and his role in it in return for immunity. The commission's counsel, Geoffrey Watson, said the funding was significant enough to call the legitimacy of Owen's victory into question. Following this revelation, Owen resigned from the Liberal Party and moved to the parliamentary crossbench as an independent pending the result of the inquiry. On 12 August 2014, as a result of mounting political pressure, Owen resigned from parliament hours later. As an "explicit act of atonement" for the actions of Owen and others, the Liberals opted not to contest the ensuing 2014 Newcastle by-election, which saw Labor reclaim the seat. He was however subsequently not found to be corrupt in the final ICAC findings along with his other Liberal colleagues.

== Honours and awards ==
Owen was appointed a Member of the Order of Australia (Military Division) (AM) on 26 January 2007. He received the Australian Active Service Medal and the Iraq and Afghanistan campaign medals in 2009.

Ribbon	Description	Notes	Date awarded	Citation
Ribbon for the Order of Australia (Military Division)	Order of Australia (Military Division)		26 January 2007	for exceptional service in the development of the Royal Australian Air Force's surveillance and response capability.
Ribbon of the AASM	Australian Active Service Medal	with ICAT clasp	2009	
Ribbon of the Afghanistan Medal for Australia	Afghanistan Medal		2009	
Ribbon of the Iraq Medal for Australia	Iraq Medal		2009	

New South Wales Legislative Assembly
Preceded by Jodi McKay	Member for Newcastle; 2011–2014	Succeeded by Tim Crakanthorp
