= Electoral district of Charlestown =

Charlestown New South Wales—Legislative Assembly
- Interactive map of district boundaries from the 2023 state election
- State: New South Wales
- Dates current: 1971–present
- MP: Jodie Harrison
- Party: Labor Party
- Namesake: Charlestown, New South Wales
- Electors: 60,974 (2023)
- Area: 66.18 km^{2} (25.6 sq mi)
- Demographic: Inner-metropolitan
Electorates around Charlestown:
Wallsend	Wallsend	Newcastle
Lake Macquarie	Charlestown	Pacific Ocean
Lake Macquarie	Swansea	Pacific Ocean

Charlestown is an electoral district of the Legislative Assembly in the Australian state of New South Wales. It has been represented by Jodie Harrison of the Labor Party since the Charlestown by-election on 25 October 2014.

== Geography ==
It is located within Greater Newcastle and includes part of the City of Lake Macquarie (including Charlestown, Kahibah, Whitebridge, Dudley, Gateshead, Mount Hutton, Windale, Kotara South, Cardiff, Hillsborough, Warners Bay, Eleebana and Tingira Heights) and a small part of the City of Newcastle (including Adamstown and Kotara).

== History ==
The seat was created in 1971, replacing parts of the abolished districts of Hamilton and Kahibah. It was held continuously by Labor until the 2011 election, when it was won by Andrew Cornwell of the Liberal Party. Cornwell became an independent and moved to the crossbench on 6 August 2014 after accusations at ICAC. He resigned from parliament on 12 August 2014 after evidence of corruption was uncovered. Jodie Harrison won the subsequent by-election.

== Members for Charlestown ==
Member	Party	Period
Jack Stewart	Labor	1971–1972
Richard Face	Labor	1972–2003
Matthew Morris	Labor	2003–2011
Andrew Cornwell	Liberal	2011–2014
Andrew Cornwell	Independent	2014–2014
Jodie Harrison	Labor	2014–present

== Election results ==
2023 New South Wales state election: Charlestown
Party	Candidate	Votes	%	±%
Labor	Jodie Harrison	30,432	57.4	+7.7
Liberal	Jack Antcliff	13,178	24.9	−6.7
Greens	Greg Watkinson	6,778	12.8	+1.6
Sustainable Australia	Marie Rolfe	2,593	4.9	+4.9
Total formal votes		52,981	97.0	+0.6
Informal votes		1,632	3.0	−0.6
Turnout		54,613	89.6	−2.4
Two-party-preferred result
Labor	Jodie Harrison	35,300	71.1	+8.0
Liberal	Jack Antcliff	14,358	28.9	−8.0
Labor hold		Swing	+8.0	
