= Results of the 2015 New South Wales Legislative Council election =

Legislative Council election for New South Wales, Australia in March 2015

2015 New South Wales state election (Legislative Council)
← 2011	26 March 2015	2019 →

21 of the 42 seats in the Legislative Council 21 seats needed for a majority
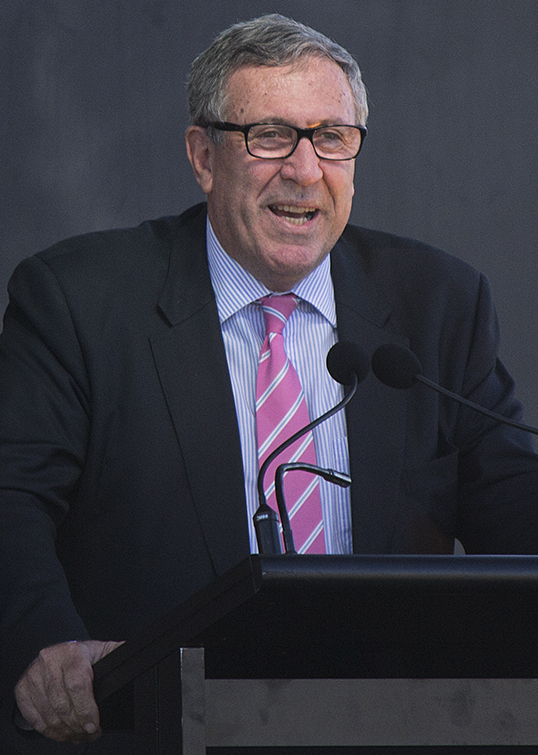

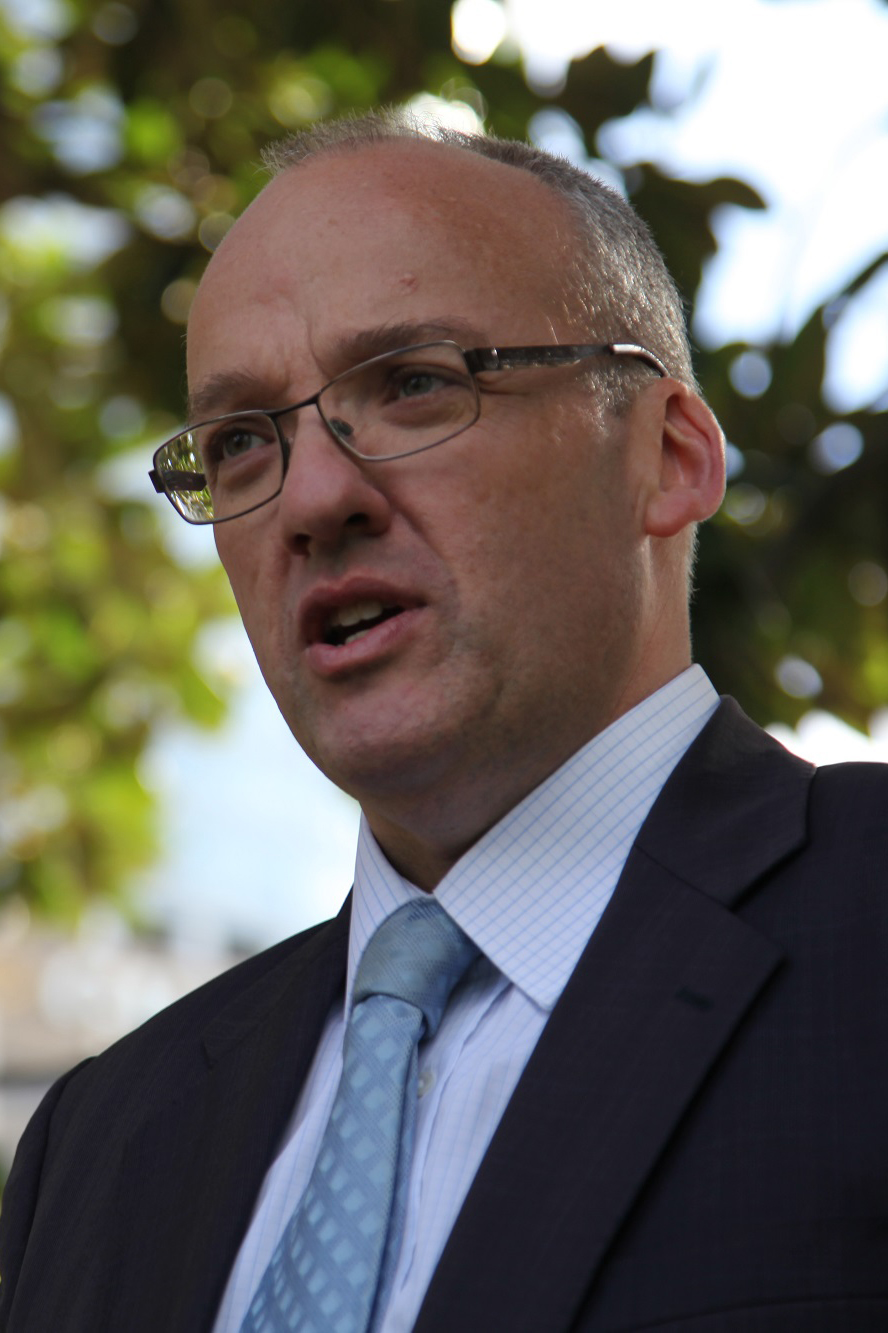

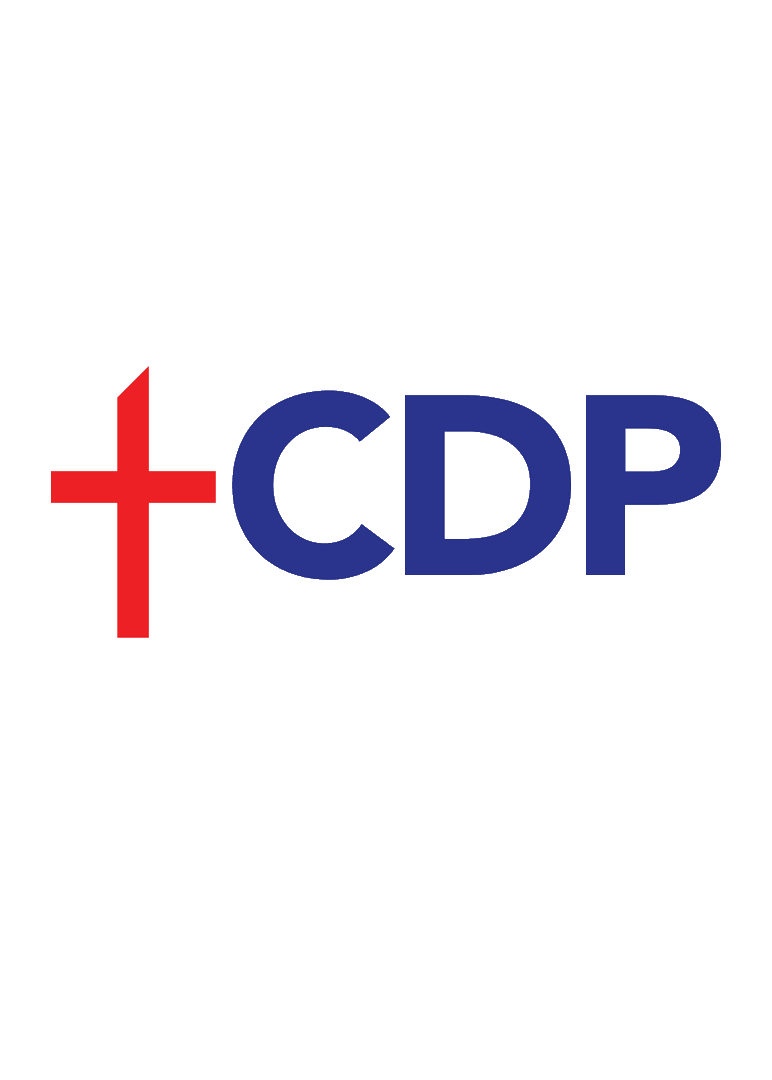
	First party	Second party	Third party
Leader	Duncan Gay	Luke Foley	None
Party	Coalition	Labor	Greens
Seats before	19	14	5
Seats won	9	7	2
Seats after	20	12	5
Seat change	▲1	▼2	Steady
Popular vote	1,839,452	1,341,943	428,036
Percentage	42.61%	31.09%	9.92%
Swing	▼5.07pp	▲7.36pp	▼1.20pp
	Fourth party	Fifth party	Sixth party
	SFF		AJP
Leader	Robert Borsak	Fred Nile	None
Party	SFF	Christian Democrats	Animal Justice
Seats before	2	2	0
Seats won	1	1	1
Seats after	2	2	1
Seat change	Steady	Steady	▲1
Popular vote	167,871	126,305	76,819
Percentage	3.89%	2.93%	1.78%
Swing	▲0.20pp	▼0.20pp	▲1.78pp

This is a list of results for the Legislative Council at the 2015 New South Wales state election.

== Results ==
2015 New South Wales state election: Legislative Council
Party	Candidate	Votes	%	±%
Quota		196,205		
Liberal/National Coalition	1. John Ajaka (Lib) (elected 1); 2. Ben Franklin (Nat) (elected 4); 3. Matthew Mason-Cox (Lib) (elected 7); 4. Don Harwin (Lib) (elected 9); 5. Bronnie Taylor (Nat) (elected 11); 6. Lou Amato (Lib) (elected 13); 7. Shayne Mallard (Lib) (elected 15); 8. Trevor Khan (Nat) (elected 16); 9. Scott Farlow (Lib) (elected 17); 10. Hollie Hughes (Lib); 11. John Williams (Nat); 12. Reena Jethi (Lib); 13. Craig Chung (Lib); 14. Jennifer Carpenter (Lib); 15. Matthew Connolly (Nat); 16. Steve Yang (Lib)	1,839,452	42.61	−5.07
Labor	1. Sophie Cotsis (elected 2); 2. Walt Secord (elected 5); 3. Lynda Voltz (elected 8); 4. Shaoquett Moselmane (elected 10); 5. Mick Veitch (elected 12); 6. Adam Searle (elected 14); 7. Courtney Houssos (elected 18); 8. Daniel Mookhey; 9. Helen Westwood; 10. Aisha Amjad; 11. Annette Priest; 12. Jill Lay; 13. Floris Lam; 14. Blake Mooney; 15. Keith Williams; 16. Frank Alafaci; 17. Kun Huang; 18. Lucille McKenna; 19. Jennifer Clapham; 20. Rosemary Maker; 21. Daniel Barbar	1,341,943	31.09	+7.36
Greens	1. John Kaye (elected 3); 2. Mehreen Faruqi (elected 6); 3. Justin Field; 4. Dawn Walker; 5. James Ryan; 6. Penny Blatchford; 7. Melissa Brooks; 8. Jan Davis; 9. Christine Donayre; 10. Mithra Cox; 11. Marika Kontellis; 12. Sylvie Ellsmore; 13. Therese Doyle; 14. Harriett Swift; 15. Darelle Duncan; 16. Susan Jarnason; 17. Barbara Bloch; 18. Matthew Thompson; 19. Sue Stock; 20. De Brierley Newton; 21. Kylie Turner	428,036	9.92	−1.20
Shooters and Fishers	1. Robert Borsak (elected 19); 2. Peter Johnson; 3. Karl Houseman; 4. Steve Lee; 5. Daniel Spears; 6. Jacqui Wood; 7. Alain Noujaim; 8. Dane Van Der Neut; 9. Leslie Palmer; 10. Sam Cannuli; 11. Danielle Neville; 12. Nadrra Sarkis; 13. Jason LeSage; 14. Craig Steel; 15. Tony McManus; 16. Mike Crockford; 17. Peter Richards; 18. Arthur Baker; 19. Linda Patchett; 20. Bob Shaw; 21. Dave Cook	167,871	3.89	+0.2
Christian Democrats	1. Fred Nile (elected 20); 2. Ross Clifford; 3. Peter Tadros; 4. Simon Khoury; 5. Soon-Hyung Kwon; 6. Stan Colefax; 7. Elwyn Sheppard; 8. Valerie Tarela-Moyes; 9. Beth Smith; 10. Joe Chircop; 11. Roger Bolling; 12. Kay Bolling; 13. Elwynne Waddell; 14. Graham Waddell; 15. Andrew Green; 16. Robyn Peebles; 17. Bernie Gesling; 18. Leeanne Gesling; 19. Arthur Moore; 20. Diana Thew	126,305	2.93	−0.2
No Land Tax	1. Peter Jones; 2. Pat Carbone; 3. Gus Macri; 4. James Ruben; 5. Gary Adamson; 6. Cathy O'Toole; 7. Sharon Fitzpatrick; 8. Ron Wilson; 9. Joe Lopreiato; 10. Jezza Armer; 11. Emma Cacciotti; 12. James Austin; 13. Frank Franzone; 14. Ulysses Maclaren; 15. Kate Lynch; 16. Patria Cook	82,054	1.90	
Animal Justice	1. Mark Pearson (elected 21); 2. Lynda Stoner; 3. Tracey Keenan; 4. Rosemary Garlick; 5. Marcel Woolfe; 6. Julia Riseley; 7. Sally Dingle Wall; 8. Douglas Davison; 9. Ellie Robertson; 10. Wayne Ericksen; 11. Joanna Ericksen; 12. Carol Bellenger; 13. Debbie Tomasums; 14. Kate Paterson; 15. Laurie Akkanen; 16. Theresa Taylor	76,819	1.78	
Voluntary Euthanasia	1. Shayne Higson; 2. Richard Mills; 3. Deirdre Johnson; 4. Brian Beaumont Owles; 5. Judith Daley; 6. Bill King; 7. Natasha Mulhall; 8. Joshua Britt; 9. Kath Schilling; 10. John Mackenzie; 11. Sandi Steep; 12. Ken Meyer; 13. Donald Bayley; 14. Patricia Driscoll; 15. Geoffrey Williams	40,710	0.94	
No Parking Meters	1. Charles Matthews; 2. Robert Morris; 3. Jeff Sayle; 4. Victor Brooking; 5. Eddie Nasr; 6. Kevin Barron; 7. Louise Morrisey; 8. Frank Bennett; 9. Paul Dean; 10. Michael Morrisey; 11. Ranbir Singh; 12. Hasmukhlal Gohil; 13. Jo-Anne Morrisey; 14. Michelle Morrisey; 15. Carol Matthews; 16. John Downey; 17. Neil Paine; 18. Michael Garnett; 19. Susan Bisaro; 20. Christopher Quinane; 21. Eileen Quinane	34,852	0.81	−0.40
Fishing Party	1. Bob Smith; 2. Liz Stocker; 3. Craig Oaten; 4. Chris Goodbar; 5. Deanne Shepherd; 6. Stewart Paterson; 7. Luke Vitnell; 8. Adrian Purcell; 9. Miranda Shepherd; 10. Scott Atkins; 11. Craig McCartney; 12. Ted Mackay; 13. Kevin Johnson; 14. Vicki Johns; 15. Dave McCartney; 16. Michael O'Connor; 17. Paul Derrick; 18. Adrian Callaghan; 19. Matt Small; 20. Victor Shen	31,882	0.74	−0.59
Outdoor Recreation	1. Peter Whelan; 2. Mark Ellis; 3. James Whelan; 4. Suellen Bell; 5. Joaquim De Lima; 6. Richard Berner; 7. Adam Frost; 8. Graham Nickols; 9. Jim Musgrave; 10. Terje Petersen; 11. Vinay Kolhatkar; 12. Stephen Denton; 13. Keith Garemyn; 14. Janos Beregszaszi; 15. Robert Dawson	31,445	0.73	−0.04
Motorist	1. Denis Walford; 2. Bob Honeybrook; 3. Grant Walford; 4. Paul Di Meglio; 5. Lindy Kyle; 6. Anthony Hogan; 7. Christine Sutherland; 8. Ross Bridge; 9. Robert Ward; 10. Neil Blanch; 11. Brendon Munn; 12. Terry Foster; 13. Phillip Diiorio; 14. John Wardle; 15. Wes Ward; 16. Nicole Walford; 17. Kath Ward	27,785	0.64	
Democrats	1. Rendall Wagner; 2. Ronaldo Villaver; 3. Simon Lovell; 4. Julia Melland; 5. Andrew Wallace; 6. Sue-Maree Olsen; 7. Mayo Materazzo; 8. David King; 9. Samantha Elliott-Halls; 10. Glenn Luxford; 11. Stephen Bingle; 12. Garry Dalrymple; 13. John Wiggin; 14. Thomas Barca; 15. Chris Ridings	23,466	0.54	−0.30
Cyclists	1. Omar Khalifa; 2. Anthony New; 3. Ingrid Ralph; 4. Ken Thompson; 5. George Paxinos; 6. Yvette Paxinos; 7. James Pennefather; 8. Philip Griffiths; 9. Nick Bonich; 10. Chloe Mason; 11. David Denton; 12. Dave Gardiner; 13. Roman Ciurpita; 14. Barbara Hickson; 15. Angus Harper-Smith	21,280	0.49	
Building Australia	1. Ray Brown; 2. Eva Emrich; 3. Michael O'Donnell; 4. David Walter; 5. Nikki Atkins; 6. Geoff Craig; 7. Ross Harwood; 8. Christine Murray; 9. Bob Hearn; 10. Neville Jones; 11. John Vellenga; 12. Helen Boland; 13. Chris Ericoli; 14. John Rostirolla; 15. Simon Costigan; 16. Gregory Atkins; 17. Kevin Cranfield	12,466	0.29	+0.07
Socialist Alliance	1. Sharlene Leroy-Dyer; 2. John Rainford; 3. Mia Sanders; 4. Howard Byrnes; 5. Pip Hinman; 6. Gregory McFarlane; 7. Rachel Evans; 8. John Coleman; 9. Coral Wynter; 10. Ben Kohler; 11. Jemma Nott; 12. Paul Benedek; 13. Kathryn Fairfax; 14. Duncan Roden; 15. Margaret Allan; 16. Nicole McGregor	8,489	0.20	−0.06
Group D	1. Christopher Buttel; 2. Sean Stratton; 3. Nicholas Renshaw; 4. Kristy Strong; 5. Peter Brennan; 6. Jamie Ambrose; 7. Mark Fisher-Webster; 8. Thomas Russell; 9. Bradley Law; 10. Andrew George; 11. Philip Imsies; 12. Simon Zammit; 13. Mark Howard; 14. Darrel Greentree; 15. Joshua Rousell; 16. Lynette Miller	6,251	0.14	
Group J	1. James Liu; 2. Wei Jing; 3. Cerelia Fountain; 4. Bao Ming Xian; 5. Jie Liang; 6. Hua Mei Ruan; 7. Xiao Fang Zhou; 8. Xiao Yi Guo; 9. Lam Chong Cheung; 10. Iok Long Ng; 11. Xue Ming Pan; 12. Kim Fong Ng; 12. Yingxi Ma; 14. Nan Yin; 15. Feng Yi Ni	4,361	0.10	
Strata (Note: Not a registered party and no affiliation was shown on the ballot paper)	1. Christine Byrne; 2. Jan Rashbrook; 3. Pamela Dilworth; 4. John Hutchinson; 5. Ken Parkes; 6. Brent Clark; 7. Luke Derwent; 8. Allan Hoy; 9. Adam Jones; 10. Sarah Hatcher; 11. Janet Donald; 12. Tonja Gibson; 13. Peter Driscoll; 14. Bruce Aitken; 15. Wendy Johnson	3,024	0.07	
Future	1. James Jansson; 2. Andrea Finno; 3. Saritha Manickam; 4. Daniel Powell; 5. Cory Bill; 6. Markus Pfister; 7. Thomas Gordon; 8. Colin Simmer; 9. Jared Ackerman; 10. Myles Cover; 11. Eve Slavich; 12. Cameron Walsh; 13. Todd Rockoff; 14. James Haggerty; 15. Tom Byrt; 16. Nathan Page	2,782	0.06	
Group P	1. Andrew Thaler; 2. Kate Schwager; 3. David Quince; 4. Anne Kennedy; 5. Peter Hill; 6. Venecia Wilson; 7. Mark Robinson; 8. Benjamin Heslop; 9. Sonya Marshall; 10. Ron Campey; 11. Pam Goldsmith; 12. Drew Simmons; 13. Rusan Hil; 14. Alisa Thaler; 15. Bill Schwager	2,767	0.06	
Country	1. Ron Pike; 2. Paul Snaidero; 3. Paul Pierotti; 4. Pete Mailler; 5. Alan Barton; 6. Ross Davidson; 7. John Egan; 8. James Harker-Mortlock; 9. Brian Hopper; 10. Ellemarie McLachlan; 11. Lorraine Mouafi; 12. Julie Pike; 13. Jenny Wills; 14. Carmen Woods	959	0.02	
Independent	Ramsay Nuthall	266	0.01	
Arts	PJ Collins	233	0.01	+9.7
Independent	Jane Ward	118	0.00	
Group U	1. Jennifer Stefanac; 2. Tucky Cooley	113	0.00	
Group W	1. Warwick Erwin; 2. Ray Robinson	113	0.00	
Independent	Sal Scevola	111	0.00	
Independent	David Ash	83	0.00	
Independent	Mahesh Pundpal	81	0.00	
Independent	David Chen	70	0.00	
Independent	Alan Hood	62	0.00	
Independent	Tony Bennett	42	0.00	
Independent	Anthony Craig	39	0.00	
Independent	Alain Brix-Nielsen	38	0.00	
Independent	Gordon Crisp	28	0.00	
Independent	Stuart Baanstra	23	0.00	
Independent	Geoff Cox	21	0.00	
Independent	Robert Spreadborough	20	0.00	
Independent	Aaron Baldwin	20	0.00	
Independent	John Justice	18	0.00	
Total formal votes		4,316,498	94.35	−0.30
Informal votes		258,368	5.65	+0.30
Turnout		4,574,866	90.76	−2.13

== Continuing members ==
The following members of the Legislative Council were not up for re-election this year.

Party	Member
Liberal	David Clarke
Liberal	Catherine Cusack
Liberal	Scot MacDonald
Liberal	Natasha Maclaren-Jones
Liberal	Greg Pearce
Liberal	Peter Phelps
National NSW	Niall Blair
National NSW	Rick Colless
National NSW	Duncan Gay
National NSW	Sarah Mitchell
Labor	Greg Donnelly
Labor	Peter Primrose
Labor	Penny Sharpe (Note: Penny Sharpe resigned her seat in March 2015 to unsuccessfully contest the lower house seat of Newtown at the 2015 state election. In May 2015 Sharpe was appointed to fill the vacancy caused by her resignation.)
Labor	Steve Whan (Note: Steve Whan resigned his seat in March 2015 to unsuccessfully contest the lower house seat of Monaro at the 2015 state election. In May 2015 Daniel Mookhey was appointed to fill the vacancy.)
Labor	Ernest Wong
Greens	Jan Barham
Greens	Jeremy Buckingham
Greens	David Shoebridge
Christian Democrats	Paul Green
Shooters and Fishers	Robert Brown
Independent (Ex Liberal)	Mike Gallacher

== See also ==
- Results of the 2015 New South Wales state election (Legislative Assembly)
- Candidates of the 2015 New South Wales state election
- Members of the New South Wales Legislative Council, 2015–2019
