= Results of the 2015 New South Wales Legislative Assembly election =

State election for New South Wales, Australia in March 2015

Party	Votes	%	+/–	Seats	+/–
Liberal	1,545,168	35.08	▼3.50	37	▼14
Labor	1,500,855	34.08	▲8.52	34	▲14
National	464,653	10.55	▼2.02	17	▼1
Greens	453,031	10.29	▲0.01	3	▲2
Independents	181,642	4.12	▼4.72	2	▼1
Christian Democrats	142,632	3.24	▲0.12	0	Steady
No Land Tax	88,792	2.02	New	0	New
Animal Justice	5,164	0.12	▲0.12	0	Steady
Cyclists	4,892	0.11	New	0	New
Unity	3,647	0.08	▲0.08	0	Steady
Outdoor Recreation	3,096	0.07	▼0.04	0	Steady
Socialist Alliance	1,295	0.03	▼0.05	0	Steady
Others	9,467	0.21	▼0.39	0	Steady
Total	4,404,334	100.00	–	93	–
Valid votes	4,404,334	96.56			
Invalid/blank votes	156,900	3.44	▲0.24		
Total votes	4,561,234	100.00	–		
Registered voters/turnout	5,040,662	90.49	▼2.06		
Two-party-preferred
Liberal/National Coalition	2,141,898	54.32	▼9.90		
Labor	1,801,195	45.68	▲9.90		
Total	3,943,093	100.00	–		

This is a list of electoral district results for the 2015 New South Wales state election.

== Albury ==
2015 New South Wales state election: Albury
Party	Candidate	Votes	%	±%
Liberal	Greg Aplin	26,800	57.8	−0.9
Labor	Ross Jackson	14,684	31.7	+16.4
Greens	Niloufer King	2,603	5.6	+0.6
Christian Democrats	Kym Wade	1,254	2.7	+0.2
No Land Tax	John Marra	1,006	2.2	+2.2
Total formal votes		46,347	96.5	+0.5
Informal votes		1,681	3.5	−0.5
Turnout		48,028	87.9	−1.0
Two-party-preferred result
Liberal	Greg Aplin	27,915	63.2	−13.9
Labor	Ross Jackson	16,233	36.8	+13.9
Liberal hold		Swing	−13.9	

== Auburn ==
2015 New South Wales state election: Auburn
Party	Candidate	Votes	%	±%
Labor	Luke Foley	19,504	44.5	−1.0
Liberal	Ronney Oueik	15,471	35.3	+1.9
Greens	Malikeh Michels	2,658	6.1	−0.4
Independent	Paul Garrard	2,457	5.6	+5.6
No Land Tax	Kays Ahmed	1,857	4.2	+4.2
Christian Democrats	Raema Walker	1,836	4.2	−0.5
Total formal votes		43,783	94.5	+0.1
Informal votes		2,560	5.5	−0.1
Turnout		46,343	87.0	+0.6
Two-party-preferred result
Labor	Luke Foley	21,343	55.9	−1.3
Liberal	Ronney Oueik	16,816	44.1	+1.3
Labor hold		Swing	−1.3	

== Ballina ==
2015 New South Wales state election: Ballina
Party	Candidate	Votes	%	±%
National	Kris Beavis	17,392	36.6	−19.6
Greens	Tamara Smith	12,824	27.0	+4.5
Labor	Paul Spooner	11,738	24.7	+12.8
Independent	Jeff Johnson	3,708	7.8	+7.8
Independent	Matthew Hartley	826	1.7	+1.7
Christian Democrats	Vyvyan Stott	679	1.4	−0.5
No Land Tax	Greg Zylber	291	0.6	+0.6
Total formal votes		47,458	97.7	+0.0
Informal votes		1,141	2.3	−0.0
Turnout		48,599	88.4	+2.0
Notional two-party-preferred count
Labor	Paul Spooner	21,484	53.0	+27.7
National	Kris Beavis	19,031	47.0	−27.7
Two-candidate-preferred result
Greens	Tamara Smith	21,528	53.1	+20.1
National	Kris Beavis	18,996	46.9	−20.1
Greens gain from National		Swing	+20.1	

== Balmain ==
2015 New South Wales state election: Balmain
Party	Candidate	Votes	%	±%
Greens	Jamie Parker	17,556	37.4	+6.3
Labor	Verity Firth	14,930	31.8	+1.9
Liberal	Lyndon Gannon	11,682	24.9	−5.8
Cyclists	Patrick Fogarty	951	2.0	+2.0
Animal Justice	Michelle Nielsen	913	1.9	+1.9
No Land Tax	Gordon Brown	527	1.1	+1.1
Christian Democrats	Rhonda Avasalu	393	0.8	−0.1
Total formal votes		46,952	97.9	+0.8
Informal votes		999	2.1	−0.8
Turnout		47,951	88.3	+2.1
Notional two-party-preferred count
Labor	Verity Firth	25,840	65.8	+11.1
Liberal	Lyndon Gannon	13,456	34.2	−11.1
Two-candidate-preferred result
Greens	Jamie Parker	20,019	54.7	+4.3
Labor	Verity Firth	16,557	45.3	−4.3
Greens hold		Swing	+4.3	

== Bankstown ==
2015 New South Wales state election: Bankstown
Party	Candidate	Votes	%	±%
Labor	Tania Mihailuk	24,170	56.3	+8.8
Liberal	George Zakhia	13,408	31.2	+0.9
Greens	Luke Poliszcuk	1,903	4.4	−0.8
Christian Democrats	Juliat Nasr	1,813	4.2	−0.2
No Land Tax	Jeremy Lawrance	1,113	2.6	+2.6
Socialist Equality	Oscar Grenfell	501	1.2	−0.8
Total formal votes		42,908	93.9	+1.2
Informal votes		2,785	6.1	−1.2
Turnout		45,693	87.0	−1.7
Two-party-preferred result
Labor	Tania Mihailuk	25,382	64.0	+3.4
Liberal	George Zakhia	14,293	36.0	−3.4
Labor hold		Swing	+3.4	

== Barwon ==
2015 New South Wales state election: Barwon
Party	Candidate	Votes	%	±%
National	Kevin Humphries	23,426	49.1	−22.9
Labor	Craig Ashby	11,454	24.0	+2.5
Independent	Rohan Boehm	8,051	16.9	+16.9
Greens	Cameron Jones	2,942	6.2	+0.3
Christian Democrats	Ian Hutchinson	1,192	2.5	+2.5
No Land Tax	Nella Lopreiato	646	1.4	+1.4
Total formal votes		47,711	96.6	−0.6
Informal votes		1,670	3.4	+0.6
Turnout		49,381	87.6	+1.1
Two-party-preferred result
National	Kevin Humphries	25,524	62.9	−13.1
Labor	Craig Ashby	15,065	37.1	+13.1
National hold		Swing	−13.1	

== Bathurst ==
2015 New South Wales state election: Bathurst
Party	Candidate	Votes	%	±%
National	Paul Toole	29,135	59.9	−7.4
Labor	Cass Coleman	13,314	27.4	+6.5
Greens	Tracey Carpenter	4,436	9.1	+2.9
Christian Democrats	Narelle Rigby	1,010	2.1	+2.1
No Land Tax	Tom Cripps	750	1.5	+1.5
Total formal votes		48,645	97.4	+0.0
Informal votes		1,314	2.6	−0.0
Turnout		49,959	92.3	+0.8
Two-party-preferred result
National	Paul Toole	30,241	65.8	−7.9
Labor	Cass Coleman	15,704	34.2	+7.9
National hold		Swing	−7.9	

== Baulkham Hills ==
2015 New South Wales state election: Baulkham Hills
Party	Candidate	Votes	%	±%
Liberal	David Elliott	31,793	64.5	−3.1
Labor	Ryan Tracey	10,920	22.2	+5.9
Greens	Alice Suttie	3,894	7.9	−2.0
Christian Democrats	Kaia Thorpe	1,686	3.4	−0.9
No Land Tax	Neil Holden	973	2.0	+2.0
Total formal votes		49,266	97.3	+0.4
Informal votes		1,390	2.7	−0.4
Turnout		50,656	93.8	−4.6
Two-party-preferred result
Liberal	David Elliott	33,021	71.8	−6.6
Labor	Ryan Tracey	12,975	28.2	+6.6
Liberal hold		Swing	−6.6	

== Bega ==
2015 New South Wales state election: Bega
Party	Candidate	Votes	%	±%
Liberal	Andrew Constance	25,379	53.2	−5.1
Labor	Leanne Atkinson	15,652	32.8	+10.7
Greens	Margaret Perger	4,817	10.1	−2.0
No Land Tax	Clyde Archard	1,138	2.4	+2.4
Christian Democrats	Ursula Bennett	683	1.4	−0.2
Total formal votes		47,669	97.1	+0.8
Informal votes		1,427	2.9	−0.8
Turnout		49,096	90.1	+0.3
Two-party-preferred result
Liberal	Andrew Constance	26,023	58.2	−10.3
Labor	Leanne Atkinson	18,696	41.8	+10.3
Liberal hold		Swing	−10.3	

== Blacktown ==
2015 New South Wales state election: Blacktown
Party	Candidate	Votes	%	±%
Labor	John Robertson	24,916	53.9	+9.5
Liberal	Raman Bhalla	14,250	30.8	−5.3
Greens	David Bate	2,937	6.3	+0.8
Christian Democrats	Meena Hanna	2,750	5.9	+0.2
No Land Tax	Julia Cacciotti	1,411	3.0	+3.0
Total formal votes		46,264	95.3	+0.6
Informal votes		2,262	4.7	−0.6
Turnout		48,526	89.0	−2.7
Two-party-preferred result
Labor	John Robertson	26,679	63.2	+9.0
Liberal	Raman Bhalla	15,547	36.8	−9.0
Labor hold		Swing	+9.0	

== Blue Mountains ==
2015 New South Wales state election: Blue Mountains
Party	Candidate	Votes	%	±%
Labor	Trish Doyle	19,995	41.2	+18.7
Liberal	Roza Sage	17,241	35.5	−4.1
Greens	Alandra Tasire	7,888	16.2	−0.7
Christian Democrats	Tony Piper	1,507	3.1	−1.1
Independent	Mark Harrison	1,470	3.0	+3.0
No Land Tax	Gianna Maiorana	450	0.9	+0.9
Total formal votes		48,551	97.5	+0.5
Informal votes		1,252	2.5	−0.5
Turnout		49,803	93.3	+0.7
Two-party-preferred result
Labor	Trish Doyle	25,866	58.1	+13.5
Liberal	Roza Sage	18,616	41.9	−13.5
Labor gain from Liberal		Swing	+13.5	

== Cabramatta ==
2015 New South Wales state election: Cabramatta
Party	Candidate	Votes	%	±%
Labor	Nick Lalich	28,568	59.9	+14.5
Liberal	Maria Diep	13,472	28.2	−13.6
Greens	Bill Cashman	2,466	5.2	−2.6
Christian Democrats	Don Modarelli	1,959	4.1	−0.3
No Land Tax	Eddie Canto	1,233	2.6	+2.6
Total formal votes		47,698	95.5	+1.0
Informal votes		2,243	4.5	−1.0
Turnout		49,941	90.7	−1.3
Two-party-preferred result
Labor	Nick Lalich	29,745	67.2	+15.3
Liberal	Maria Diep	14,519	32.8	−15.3
Labor hold		Swing	+15.3	

== Camden ==
2015 New South Wales state election: Camden
Party	Candidate	Votes	%	±%
Liberal	Chris Patterson	29,545	61.4	−2.8
Labor	Cindy Cagney	13,105	27.2	+4.5
Greens	Danica Sajn	2,551	5.3	−0.2
No Land Tax	Mario Tabone	1,513	3.1	+3.1
Christian Democrats	Colin Broadbridge	1,440	3.0	−0.1
Total formal votes		48,154	96.4	+0.4
Informal votes		1,800	3.6	−0.4
Turnout		49,954	93.1	+6.3
Two-party-preferred result
Liberal	Chris Patterson	30,693	68.3	−4.5
Labor	Cindy Cagney	14,258	31.7	+4.5
Liberal hold		Swing	−4.5	

== Campbelltown ==
2015 New South Wales state election: Campbelltown
Party	Candidate	Votes	%	±%
Labor	Greg Warren	22,703	50.3	+16.3
Liberal	Bryan Doyle	17,089	37.9	−7.6
Greens	Ben Moroney	2,515	5.6	−0.8
Christian Democrats	Sarah Ramsay	1,646	3.6	−1.3
No Land Tax	Chris Stephandellis	1,181	2.6	+2.6
Total formal votes		45,134	95.8	+1.4
Informal votes		2,002	4.2	−1.4
Turnout		47,136	89.8	+0.5
Two-party-preferred result
Labor	Greg Warren	24,228	57.3	+14.1
Liberal	Bryan Doyle	18,035	42.7	−14.1
Labor gain from Liberal		Swing	+14.1	

== Canterbury ==
2015 New South Wales state election: Canterbury
Party	Candidate	Votes	%	±%
Labor	Linda Burney	23,929	50.2	+1.4
Liberal	Nomiky Panayiotakis	12,859	27.0	−9.9
Christian Democrats	Tony Issa	4,854	10.2	+6.0
Greens	Linda Eisler	4,608	9.7	+0.3
No Land Tax	Tony Maiorana	1,386	2.9	+2.9
Total formal votes		47,636	95.2	+0.3
Informal votes		2,395	4.8	−0.3
Turnout		50,031	89.7	−3.2
Two-party-preferred result
Labor	Linda Burney	27,663	65.7	+8.3
Liberal	Nomiky Panayiotakis	14,447	34.3	−8.3
Labor hold		Swing	+8.3	

== Castle Hill ==
2015 New South Wales state election: Castle Hill
Party	Candidate	Votes	%	±%
Liberal	Ray Williams	34,137	71.0	−3.7
Labor	Matt Ritchie	7,686	16.0	+4.5
Greens	Michael Bellstedt	3,353	7.0	−1.1
Christian Democrats	Muriel Sultana	1,535	3.2	−0.4
No Land Tax	Anna Stevis	1,381	2.9	+2.9
Total formal votes		48,092	97.3	+0.6
Informal votes		1,311	2.7	−0.6
Turnout		49,403	93.1	−0.0
Two-party-preferred result
Liberal	Ray Williams	35,544	79.4	−5.3
Labor	Matt Ritchie	9,224	20.6	+5.3
Liberal hold		Swing	−5.3	

== Cessnock ==
2015 New South Wales state election: Cessnock
Party	Candidate	Votes	%	±%
Labor	Clayton Barr	28,519	62.2	+28.1
National	Jessica Price-Purnell	10,652	23.2	−1.8
Greens	Lindy Williams	3,857	8.4	−0.2
No Land Tax	Domenic Lopreiato	1,465	3.2	+3.2
Christian Democrats	Julie Johnson	1,339	2.9	−0.5
Total formal votes		45,832	95.6	+0.9
Informal votes		2,111	4.4	−0.9
Turnout		47,943	91.4	+1.0
Two-party-preferred result
Labor	Clayton Barr	30,057	72.0	+18.1
National	Jessica Price-Purnell	11,685	28.0	−18.1
Labor hold		Swing	+18.1	

== Charlestown ==
2015 New South Wales state election: Charlestown
Party	Candidate	Votes	%	±%
Labor	Jodie Harrison	23,584	48.2	+19.2
Liberal	Jason Pauling	14,821	30.3	−12.7
Greens	Jane Oakley	5,378	11.0	+1.9
Independent	Luke Arms	2,830	5.8	+5.8
Christian Democrats	Brian Tucker	1,054	2.2	−0.0
Independent	Arjay Martin	712	1.5	+1.5
No Land Tax	Tania Morvillo	544	1.1	+1.1
Total formal votes		48,923	96.1	−0.0
Informal votes		2,001	3.9	+0.0
Turnout		50,924	92.9	+0.4
Two-party-preferred result
Labor	Jodie Harrison	26,976	62.9	+22.1
Liberal	Jason Pauling	15,912	37.1	−22.1
Labor hold		Swing	+22.1	

== Clarence ==
2015 New South Wales state election: Clarence
Party	Candidate	Votes	%	±%
National	Chris Gulaptis	23,799	50.4	−13.0
Labor	Trent Gilbert	13,431	28.5	+18.5
Greens	Janet Cavanaugh	4,308	9.1	+2.4
Independent	Debrah Novak	2,202	4.7	+4.7
Christian Democrats	Carol Ordish	1,143	2.4	+0.6
Independent	Bryan Robins	1,041	2.2	+2.2
Independent	Christine Robinson	833	1.8	+1.8
No Land Tax	Joe Lopreiato	427	0.9	+0.9
Total formal votes		47,184	96.9	−0.7
Informal votes		1,520	3.1	+0.7
Turnout		48,704	89.7	+0.4
Two-party-preferred result
National	Chris Gulaptis	25,082	59.7	−22.2
Labor	Trent Gilbert	16,947	40.3	+22.2
National hold		Swing	−22.2	

== Coffs Harbour ==
2015 New South Wales state election: Coffs Harbour
Party	Candidate	Votes	%	±%
National	Andrew Fraser	24,652	54.6	−11.3
Labor	June Smith	11,698	25.9	+11.7
Greens	Craig Christie	6,126	13.6	+3.1
Christian Democrats	Ian Sutherland	1,958	4.3	+0.7
No Land Tax	Annette Guerry	733	1.6	+1.6
Total formal votes		45,167	96.8	−0.3
Informal votes		1,503	3.2	+0.3
Turnout		46,670	88.9	−0.5
Two-party-preferred result
National	Andrew Fraser	26,184	64.3	−13.0
Labor	June Smith	14,537	35.7	+13.0
National hold		Swing	−13.0	

== Coogee ==
2015 New South Wales state election: Coogee
Party	Candidate	Votes	%	±%
Liberal	Bruce Notley-Smith	21,564	46.6	−1.1
Labor	Paul Pearce	15,073	32.5	+6.8
Greens	Lindsay Shurey	8,609	18.6	−2.8
No Land Tax	Victoria Gervay-Ruben	612	1.3	+1.3
Christian Democrats	Linda Dinkha	464	1.0	−0.4
Total formal votes		46,322	97.6	+0.5
Informal votes		1,117	2.4	−0.5
Turnout		47,439	87.3	−1.3
Two-party-preferred result
Liberal	Bruce Notley-Smith	22,517	52.9	−5.4
Labor	Paul Pearce	20,031	47.1	+5.4
Liberal hold		Swing	−5.4	

== Cootamundra ==
2015 New South Wales state election: Cootamundra
Party	Candidate	Votes	%	±%
National	Katrina Hodgkinson	31,080	65.9	−8.8
Labor	Charlie Sheahan	12,253	26.0	+9.3
Greens	Rod Therkelsen	1,642	3.5	−1.9
No Land Tax	Elio Cacciotti	1,118	2.4	+2.4
Christian Democrats	Philip Langfield	1,072	2.3	−0.9
Total formal votes		47,165	97.3	+0.1
Informal votes		1,305	2.7	−0.1
Turnout		48,470	91.8	+1.3
Two-party-preferred result
National	Katrina Hodgkinson	31,896	70.4	−9.9
Labor	Charlie Sheahan	13,400	29.6	+9.9
National notional hold		Swing	−9.9	

Cootamundra was a new seat combining most of the abolished district of Burrinjuck with the eastern part of the abolished district of Murrumbidgee. Katrina Hodgkinson (National) was the member for Burrinjuck and the member for Murrumbidgee, Adrian Piccoli (National) successfully contested Murray.

== Cronulla ==
2015 New South Wales state election: Cronulla
Party	Candidate	Votes	%	±%
Liberal	Mark Speakman	31,189	61.9	−3.1
Labor	Peter Scaysbrook	11,029	21.9	+2.3
Greens	Nathan Hunt	4,580	9.1	+0.3
Christian Democrats	George Capsis	2,571	5.1	+1.8
No Land Tax	Christie Mortimer	978	1.9	+1.9
Total formal votes		50,347	97.0	+0.1
Informal votes		1,550	3.0	−0.1
Turnout		51,897	93.0	+1.4
Two-party-preferred result
Liberal	Mark Speakman	32,788	70.9	−3.9
Labor	Peter Scaysbrook	13,436	29.1	+3.9
Liberal hold		Swing	−3.9	

== Davidson ==
2015 New South Wales state election: Davidson
Party	Candidate	Votes	%	±%
Liberal	Jonathan O'Dea	34,234	69.6	−4.2
Greens	David Sentinella	6,615	13.5	+0.7
Labor	Douglas St Quintin	6,222	12.7	+4.3
Christian Democrats	Mariam Salama	1,067	2.2	+0.1
No Land Tax	Kate Bevan	1,014	2.1	+2.1
Total formal votes		49,152	97.8	+0.2
Informal votes		1,118	2.2	−0.2
Turnout		50,270	92.5	+0.3
Notional two-party-preferred count
Liberal	Jonathan O'Dea	35,600	79.0	−7.2
Labor	Douglas St Quintin	9,469	21.0	+7.2
Two-candidate-preferred result
Liberal	Jonathan O'Dea	35,447	78.8	−4.2
Greens	David Sentinella	9,525	21.2	+4.2
Liberal hold		Swing	−4.2	

== Drummoyne ==
2015 New South Wales state election: Drummoyne
Party	Candidate	Votes	%	±%
Liberal	John Sidoti	28,616	61.1	+4.5
Labor	Jason Khoury	11,103	23.7	−1.1
Greens	Alice Mantel	5,141	11.0	+1.2
No Land Tax	Pat Di Cosmo	716	1.5	+1.5
Christian Democrats	Isabelle Zafirian	706	1.5	−0.5
Outdoor Recreation	Leon Belgrave	544	1.2	+1.2
Total formal votes		46,826	97.5	+0.6
Informal votes		1,200	2.5	−0.6
Turnout		48,026	91.6	+2.9
Two-party-preferred result
Liberal	John Sidoti	29,668	68.8	+1.7
Labor	Jason Khoury	13,468	31.2	−1.7
Liberal hold		Swing	+1.7	

== Dubbo ==
2015 New South Wales state election: Dubbo
Party	Candidate	Votes	%	±%
National	Troy Grant	28,165	60.5	+0.3
Labor	Stephen Lawrence	10,939	23.5	+14.0
Greens	Matt Parmeter	2,062	4.4	+0.8
Independent	Colin Hamilton	1,960	4.2	+4.2
No Land Tax	Ben Shepherd	1,306	2.8	+2.8
Christian Democrats	Peter Scherer	1,181	2.5	+2.5
Independent	Rod Pryor	973	2.1	+2.1
Total formal votes		46,586	96.7	−0.5
Informal votes		1,578	3.3	+0.5
Turnout		48,164	90.9	+3.4
Two-party-preferred result
National	Troy Grant	29,932	70.4	−10.9
Labor	Stephen Lawrence	12,571	29.6	+10.9
National hold		Swing	−10.9	

== East Hills ==
2015 New South Wales state election: East Hills
Party	Candidate	Votes	%	±%
Liberal	Glenn Brookes	20,975	44.2	+2.9
Labor	Cameron Murphy	19,958	42.1	+1.0
Greens	Astrid O'Neill	3,141	6.6	+1.7
Christian Democrats	Violet Abdulla	2,310	4.9	+0.7
No Land Tax	Jean Russell	1,078	2.3	+2.3
Total formal votes		47,462	95.7	+0.3
Informal votes		2,124	4.3	−0.3
Turnout		49,586	92.1	+0.4
Two-party-preferred result
Liberal	Glenn Brookes	22,184	50.4	+0.2
Labor	Cameron Murphy	21,812	49.6	−0.2
Liberal hold		Swing	+0.2	

== Epping ==
2015 New South Wales state election: Epping
Party	Candidate	Votes	%	±%
Liberal	Damien Tudehope	26,917	54.3	−8.4
Labor	David Havyatt	9,757	19.7	+5.2
Greens	Emma Heyde	7,001	14.1	+1.9
Independent	Kerry Fox	3,317	6.7	+6.7
Christian Democrats	Darryl Allen	1,878	3.8	−0.1
No Land Tax	Sophia Kong	664	1.3	+1.3
Total formal votes		49,534	97.5	+0.5
Informal votes		1,250	2.5	−0.5
Turnout		50,784	93.1	−1.6
Two-party-preferred result
Liberal	Damien Tudehope	29,201	66.2	−11.3
Labor	David Havyatt	14,890	33.8	+11.3
Liberal hold		Swing	−11.3	

== Fairfield ==
2015 New South Wales state election: Fairfield
Party	Candidate	Votes	%	±%
Labor	Guy Zangari	24,670	53.7	+10.8
Liberal	Charbel Saliba	11,079	24.1	−14.8
Christian Democrats	Edward Royal	4,500	9.8	+4.6
No Land Tax	James Lazar	3,281	7.1	+7.1
Greens	Andrew Nicholson	2,406	5.2	−1.5
Total formal votes		45,936	94.6	+1.3
Informal votes		2,637	5.4	−1.3
Turnout		48,573	89.1	−1.1
Two-party-preferred result
Labor	Guy Zangari	26,667	67.8	+15.5
Liberal	Charbel Saliba	12,669	32.2	−15.5
Labor hold		Swing	+15.5	

== Gosford ==
2015 New South Wales state election: Gosford
Party	Candidate	Votes	%	±%
Liberal	Chris Holstein	20,535	42.5	−7.6
Labor	Kathy Smith	18,654	38.7	+11.0
Greens	Kate Da Costa	4,346	9.0	−2.9
Independent	Jake Cassar	2,698	5.6	+5.6
Christian Democrats	Andrew Church	1,091	2.3	−1.2
No Land Tax	Matthew Maroney	938	1.9	+1.9
Total formal votes		48,262	96.8	+0.9
Informal votes		1,573	3.2	−0.9
Turnout		49,835	90.6	−0.3
Two-party-preferred result
Labor	Kathy Smith	22,029	50.2	+12.2
Liberal	Chris Holstein	21,826	49.8	−12.2
Labor gain from Liberal		Swing	+12.2	

== Goulburn ==
2015 New South Wales state election: Goulburn
Party	Candidate	Votes	%	±%
Liberal	Pru Goward	23,725	48.7	+9.7
Labor	Ursula Stephens	16,681	34.3	+18.5
Greens	Iain Fyfe	3,827	7.9	−2.1
Outdoor Recreation	Wal Ashton	2,552	5.2	+5.2
Christian Democrats	Adrian Van Der Byl	1,196	2.5	−0.5
No Land Tax	Stephen Fitzpatrick	692	1.4	+1.4
Total formal votes		48,673	97.3	+0.7
Informal votes		1,373	2.7	−0.7
Turnout		50,046	92.7	+2.5
Two-party-preferred result
Liberal	Pru Goward	25,138	56.6	−20.2
Labor	Ursula Stephens	19,248	43.4	+20.2
Liberal hold		Swing	−20.2	

== Granville ==
2015 New South Wales state election: Granville
Party	Candidate	Votes	%	±%
Labor	Julia Finn	18,555	41.0	+4.2
Liberal	Tony Issa	17,032	37.7	−4.8
Christian Democrats	Lara Taouk Sleiman	5,609	12.4	+7.1
Greens	James Atanasious	2,441	5.4	−0.4
Independent	Steven Lopez	857	1.9	+1.9
No Land Tax	Mario Marra	732	1.6	+1.6
Total formal votes		45,226	95.3	+0.5
Informal votes		2,223	4.7	−0.5
Turnout		47,449	89.2	−1.9
Two-party-preferred result
Labor	Julia Finn	20,662	52.1	+5.9
Liberal	Tony Issa	18,987	47.9	−5.9
Labor gain from Liberal		Swing	+5.9	

== Hawkesbury ==
2015 New South Wales state election: Hawkesbury
Party	Candidate	Votes	%	±%
Liberal	Dominic Perrottet	26,530	56.6	−9.9
Labor	Barry Calvert	10,520	22.4	+7.1
Greens	Danielle Wheeler	3,534	7.5	−2.8
Independent	Kate Mackaness	2,845	6.1	+6.1
Christian Democrats	Caroline Fraser	1,250	2.7	−1.1
No Land Tax	Victor Alberts	935	2.0	+2.0
Independent	Ralph Harlander	733	1.6	+1.6
Australia First	Tania Rollinson	518	1.1	+1.1
Total formal votes		46,865	95.8	−0.2
Informal votes		2,063	4.2	+0.2
Turnout		48,928	92.2	+4.6
Two-party-preferred result
Liberal	Dominic Perrottet	27,866	67.8	−10.6
Labor	Barry Calvert	13,246	32.2	+10.6
Liberal hold		Swing	−10.6	

== Heathcote ==
2015 New South Wales state election: Heathcote
Party	Candidate	Votes	%	±%
Liberal	Lee Evans	25,554	50.0	−4.6
Labor	Maryanne Stuart	16,724	32.7	+11.5
Greens	Natasha Watson	4,729	9.2	−1.9
Independent	Greg Petty	1,893	3.7	−2.4
Christian Democrats	Ula Falanga	1,518	3.0	−1.3
No Land Tax	Ahmed Elawaad	717	1.4	+1.4
Total formal votes		51,135	96.9	+0.3
Informal votes		1,654	3.1	−0.3
Turnout		52,789	94.2	−0.6
Two-party-preferred result
Liberal	Lee Evans	26,989	57.6	−11.4
Labor	Maryanne Stuart	19,873	42.4	+11.4
Liberal hold		Swing	−11.4	

== Heffron ==
2015 New South Wales state election: Heffron
Party	Candidate	Votes	%	±%
Labor	Ron Hoenig	20,539	44.3	+4.4
Liberal	John Koutsoukis	13,775	29.7	−5.1
Greens	Osman Faruqi	9,788	21.1	+3.5
No Land Tax	Anastasia Bakss	1,392	3.0	+3.0
Christian Democrats	Shawn Arbeau	873	1.9	−0.0
Total formal votes		46,367	96.7	+0.5
Informal votes		1,558	3.3	−0.5
Turnout		47,925	87.2	+3.7
Two-party-preferred result
Labor	Ron Hoenig	26,529	64.1	+8.9
Liberal	John Koutsoukis	14,860	35.9	−8.9
Labor hold		Swing	+8.9	

== Holsworthy ==
2015 New South Wales state election: Holsworthy
Party	Candidate	Votes	%	±%
Liberal	Melanie Gibbons	23,336	49.5	+2.2
Labor	Charishma Kaliyanda	17,178	36.4	+6.0
Greens	Signe Westerberg	2,123	4.5	−1.4
Christian Democrats	Tony Maka	1,909	4.1	−1.5
	Michael Byrne	1,407	3.0	+3.0
No Land Tax	Adrian Atelj	1,180	2.5	+2.5
Total formal votes		47,133	95.1	+0.0
Informal votes		2,438	4.9	−0.0
Turnout		49,571	91.3	+1.9
Two-party-preferred result
Liberal	Melanie Gibbons	24,551	56.7	−4.0
Labor	Charishma Kaliyanda	18,749	43.3	+4.0
Liberal notional hold		Swing	−4.0	

Holsworthy was a new seat largely replacing the abolished district of Menai. Melanie Gibbons (Liberal) was the member for Menai.

== Hornsby ==
2015 New South Wales state election: Hornsby
Party	Candidate	Votes	%	±%
Liberal	Matt Kean	29,097	58.4	+8.1
Labor	Steve Ackerman	9,647	19.4	+8.4
Greens	John Storey	6,925	13.9	+1.4
Independent	Mick Gallagher	2,379	4.8	+1.4
Christian Democrats	Leighton Thew	1,256	2.5	−0.8
No Land Tax	Mary Di Cosmo	542	1.1	+1.1
Total formal votes		49,846	97.7	+0.8
Informal votes		1,164	2.3	−0.8
Turnout		51,010	93.4	+1.0
Two-party-preferred result
Liberal	Matt Kean	31,225	68.9	−7.5
Labor	Steve Ackerman	14,065	31.1	+7.5
Liberal hold		Swing	−7.5	

== Keira ==
2015 New South Wales state election: Keira
Party	Candidate	Votes	%	±%
Labor	Ryan Park	26,893	53.1	+17.1
Liberal	Philip Clifford	13,988	27.6	−7.6
Greens	Elena Martinez	7,110	14.0	−1.6
Christian Democrats	Joseph Carolan	1,703	3.4	+0.2
No Land Tax	Jason Leto	911	1.8	+1.8
Total formal votes		50,605	97.1	+0.8
Informal votes		1,500	2.9	−0.8
Turnout		52,105	91.6	−1.5
Two-party-preferred result
Labor	Ryan Park	31,626	67.4	+14.5
Liberal	Philip Clifford	15,298	32.6	−14.5
Labor hold		Swing	+14.5	

== Kiama ==
2015 New South Wales state election: Kiama
Party	Candidate	Votes	%	±%
Liberal	Gareth Ward	24,618	51.6	+8.0
Labor	Glenn Kolomeitz	15,288	32.1	+4.4
Greens	Terry Barratt	5,271	11.1	+2.2
Christian Democrats	Steve Ryan	1,505	3.2	−0.7
No Land Tax	Carmel Pellegrini	1,016	2.1	+2.1
Total formal votes		47,698	97.2	−0.0
Informal votes		1,382	2.8	+0.0
Turnout		49,080	92.4	+2.0
Two-party-preferred result
Liberal	Gareth Ward	26,114	58.7	+0.1
Labor	Glenn Kolomeitz	18,404	41.3	−0.1
Liberal hold		Swing	+0.1	

== Kogarah ==
2015 New South Wales state election: Kogarah
Party	Candidate	Votes	%	±%
Labor	Chris Minns	21,084	45.4	−2.0
Liberal	Nick Aroney	15,866	34.2	−3.9
Unity	Annie Tang	3,647	7.9	+7.9
Greens	Brent Heber	3,015	6.5	−2.3
Christian Democrats	Sonny Susilo	1,638	3.5	−2.2
No Land Tax	David Lin	1,173	2.5	+2.5
Total formal votes		46,423	95.4	+0.2
Informal votes		2,225	4.6	−0.2
Turnout		48,648	90.5	+1.8
Two-party-preferred result
Labor	Chris Minns	23,058	56.9	+1.5
Liberal	Nick Aroney	17,492	43.1	−1.5
Labor hold		Swing	+1.5	

== Ku-ring-gai ==
2015 New South Wales state election: Ku-ring-gai
Party	Candidate	Votes	%	±%
Liberal	Alister Henskens	30,294	62.5	−10.3
Labor	David Armstrong	7,927	16.4	+8.5
Greens	Pippa McInnes	7,650	15.8	+1.9
Christian Democrats	John Archer	1,375	2.8	+0.7
No Land Tax	Len Gervay	1,192	2.5	+2.5
Total formal votes		48,438	97.6	−0.3
Informal votes		1,185	2.4	+0.3
Turnout		49,623	92.8	+1.8
Two-party-preferred result
Liberal	Alister Henskens	31,954	73.0	−13.9
Labor	David Armstrong	11,832	27.0	+13.9
Liberal hold		Swing	−13.9	

== Lake Macquarie ==
2015 New South Wales state election: Lake Macquarie
Party	Candidate	Votes	%	±%
Independent	Greg Piper	20,251	42.5	+1.1
Labor	Melissa Cleary	14,625	30.7	+10.2
Liberal	Daniel Collard	8,007	16.8	−10.6
Greens	Ivan Macfadyen	2,363	5.0	−1.7
Animal Justice	Susan Strain	1,143	2.4	+2.4
Christian Democrats	Kim Gritten	898	1.9	−0.9
No Land Tax	Andrew Coroneo	412	0.9	+0.9
Total formal votes		47,699	96.8	+0.4
Informal votes		1,596	3.2	−0.4
Turnout		49,295	91.0	−1.4
Notional two-party-preferred count
Labor	Melissa Cleary	19,309	63.2	+20.6
Liberal	Daniel Collard	11,262	36.8	−20.6
Two-candidate-preferred result
Independent	Greg Piper	24,152	60.7	−3.9
Labor	Melissa Cleary	15,646	39.3	+39.3
Independent hold		Swing	−3.9	

== Lakemba ==
2015 New South Wales state election: Lakemba
Party	Candidate	Votes	%	±%
Labor	Jihad Dib	25,638	57.3	+11.1
Liberal	Rashid Bhuiyan	9,271	20.7	−13.1
Christian Democrats	George El-Dahr	5,728	12.8	+8.2
Greens	Chris Garvin	3,348	7.5	+1.9
No Land Tax	Yahya Chehab	757	1.7	+1.7
Total formal votes		44,742	94.5	+1.1
Informal votes		2,624	5.5	−1.1
Turnout		47,366	86.9	+2.5
Two-party-preferred result
Labor	Jihad Dib	27,338	71.6	+14.2
Liberal	Rashid Bhuiyan	10,864	28.4	−14.2
Labor hold		Swing	+14.2	

== Lane Cove ==
2015 New South Wales state election: Lane Cove
Party	Candidate	Votes	%	±%
Liberal	Anthony Roberts	27,789	57.1	−8.3
Labor	Andrew Zbik	9,790	20.1	+6.1
Greens	Pierre Masse	7,203	14.8	−2.7
Independent	Jim Sanderson	2,029	4.2	+4.2
Christian Democrats	Peter Colsell	1,060	2.2	−0.5
No Land Tax	Irma Di Santo	754	1.6	+1.6
Total formal votes		48,625	97.4	+0.4
Informal votes		1,317	2.6	−0.4
Turnout		49,942	91.7	+0.9
Two-party-preferred result
Liberal	Anthony Roberts	29,451	67.8	−9.5
Labor	Andrew Zbik	13,972	32.2	+9.5
Liberal hold		Swing	−9.5	

== Lismore ==
2015 New South Wales state election: Lismore
Party	Candidate	Votes	%	±%
National	Thomas George	19,975	42.5	−17.2
Greens	Adam Guise	12,435	26.4	+7.4
Labor	Isaac Smith	12,056	25.6	+12.7
Christian Democrats	Gianpiero Battista	1,339	2.8	+1.1
Animal Justice	Cherie Imlah	717	1.5	+1.5
No Land Tax	Alan Jones	525	1.1	+1.1
Total formal votes		47,047	97.8	+0.2
Informal votes		1,067	2.2	−0.2
Turnout		48,114	89.8	+0.8
Notional two-party-preferred count
National	Thomas George	21,247	50.2	−24.1
Labor	Isaac Smith	21,055	49.8	+24.1
Two-candidate-preferred result
National	Thomas George	21,654	52.9	−21.5
Greens	Adam Guise	19,309	47.1	+21.5
National hold		Swing	−21.5	

== Liverpool ==
2015 New South Wales state election: Liverpool
Party	Candidate	Votes	%	±%
Labor	Paul Lynch	27,264	60.2	+9.2
Liberal	Mazhar Hadid	10,728	23.7	−4.2
Christian Democrats	Matt Attia	3,627	8.0	+1.5
Greens	Andre Bosch	1,947	4.3	−0.9
No Land Tax	Mick Pezzano	1,753	3.9	+3.9
Total formal votes		45,319	94.6	+1.3
Informal votes		2,565	5.4	−1.3
Turnout		47,884	88.0	−1.0
Two-party-preferred result
Labor	Paul Lynch	28,842	70.9	+6.9
Liberal	Mazhar Hadid	11,841	29.1	−6.9
Labor hold		Swing	+6.9	

== Londonderry ==
2015 New South Wales state election: Londonderry
Party	Candidate	Votes	%	±%
Labor	Prue Car	23,359	50.8	+13.7
Liberal	Bernard Bratusa	16,523	36.0	−10.8
Christian Democrats	Maurice Girotto	2,332	5.1	+0.6
Greens	Shane Gorman	2,229	4.9	−1.6
No Land Tax	Joe Arduca	1,503	3.3	+3.3
Total formal votes		45,946	94.6	−0.1
Informal votes		2,607	5.4	+0.1
Turnout		48,553	89.0	+0.6
Two-party-preferred result
Labor	Prue Car	24,889	58.8	+14.2
Liberal	Bernard Bratusa	17,420	41.2	−14.2
Labor gain from Liberal		Swing	+14.2	

== Macquarie Fields ==
2015 New South Wales state election: Macquarie Fields
Party	Candidate	Votes	%	±%
Labor	Anoulack Chanthivong	23,978	50.8	+11.7
Liberal	Pat Farmer	17,247	36.5	−6.0
Greens	Mary Brownlee	1,787	3.8	−2.1
Independent	Mick Allen	1,543	3.3	+3.3
Christian Democrats	John Ramsay	1,484	3.1	−0.9
No Land Tax	Antonetta Marra	863	1.8	+1.8
	Clinton Mead	288	0.6	+0.6
Total formal votes		47,190	95.7	+0.8
Informal votes		2,096	4.3	−0.8
Turnout		49,286	89.6	+3.4
Two-party-preferred result
Labor	Anoulack Chanthivong	25,267	58.1	+9.9
Liberal	Pat Farmer	18,227	41.9	−9.9
Labor notional gain from Liberal		Swing	+9.9	

== Maitland ==
2015 New South Wales state election: Maitland
Party	Candidate	Votes	%	±%
Labor	Jenny Aitchison	20,298	42.4	+12.1
Liberal	Steve Thomson	11,877	24.8	−14.7
Independent	Philip Penfold	11,124	23.3	+23.3
Greens	John Brown	3,040	6.4	−0.4
Christian Democrats	Anna Balfour	912	1.9	−0.5
No Land Tax	Tania Esposito	577	1.2	+1.2
Total formal votes		47,828	96.6	+0.2
Informal votes		1,695	3.4	−0.2
Turnout		49,523	92.6	+2.3
Two-party-preferred result
Labor	Jenny Aitchison	25,139	63.8	+18.8
Liberal	Steve Thomson	14,246	36.2	−18.8
Labor gain from Liberal		Swing	+18.8	

== Manly ==
2015 New South Wales state election: Manly
Party	Candidate	Votes	%	±%
Liberal	Mike Baird	32,160	68.0	−2.2
Greens	Clara Williams Roldan	8,103	17.1	−0.7
Labor	Jennifer Jary	6,098	12.9	+2.5
No Land Tax	Rod Jamieson	517	1.1	+1.1
Christian Democrats	Annie Wright	420	0.9	−0.8
Total formal votes		47,298	97.9	+0.6
Informal votes		1,031	2.1	−0.6
Turnout		48,329	89.7	+2.6
Notional two-party-preferred count
Liberal	Mike Baird	33,426	78.4	+1.4
Labor	Jennifer Jary	9,209	21.6	−1.4
Two-candidate-preferred result
Liberal	Mike Baird	32,848	74.5	−2.5
Greens	Clara Williams Roldan	11,233	25.5	+2.5
Liberal hold		Swing	−2.5	

== Maroubra ==
2015 New South Wales state election: Maroubra
Party	Candidate	Votes	%	±%
Labor	Michael Daley	24,358	52.4	+7.3
Liberal	Brendan Roberts	16,440	35.4	−7.6
Greens	James Cruz	4,107	8.8	−0.9
No Land Tax	Georgia Constantinou	918	2.0	+2.0
Christian Democrats	Jacquie Shiha	672	1.4	−0.5
Total formal votes		46,495	97.1	+0.7
Informal votes		1,376	2.9	−0.7
Turnout		47,871	90.0	−0.4
Two-party-preferred result
Labor	Michael Daley	26,476	60.8	+8.6
Liberal	Brendan Roberts	17,041	39.2	−8.6
Labor hold		Swing	+8.6	

== Miranda ==
2015 New South Wales state election: Miranda
Party	Candidate	Votes	%	±%
Liberal	Eleni Petinos	27,325	55.3	−7.4
Labor	Greg Holland	14,654	29.6	+8.8
Greens	Mick Nairn	3,450	7.0	−1.0
Christian Democrats	Mark Falanga	2,139	4.3	+0.2
Independent	John Brett	1,109	2.2	−0.9
No Land Tax	Andrew Tran	777	1.6	+1.6
Total formal votes		49,454	96.7	+0.0
Informal votes		1,705	3.3	−0.0
Turnout		51,159	93.3	−0.7
Two-party-preferred result
Liberal	Eleni Petinos	28,562	63.0	−10.0
Labor	Greg Holland	16,800	37.0	+10.0
Liberal gain from Labor		Swing	−10.0	

Barry Collier (Labor) won the seat at the 2013 by-election with a swing of 26%.

== Monaro ==
2015 New South Wales state election: Monaro
Party	Candidate	Votes	%	±%
National	John Barilaro	22,518	48.7	+1.7
Labor	Steve Whan	18,761	40.6	−0.5
Greens	Peter Marshall	3,620	7.8	+0.1
No Land Tax	Leslie Dinham	691	1.5	+1.5
Christian Democrats	Joy Horton	613	1.3	−0.0
Total formal votes		46,203	97.4	+0.2
Informal votes		1,237	2.6	−0.2
Turnout		47,440	89.4	−0.5
Two-party-preferred result
National	John Barilaro	23,314	52.5	+0.5
Labor	Steve Whan	21,071	47.5	−0.5
National hold		Swing	+0.5	

== Mount Druitt ==
2015 New South Wales state election: Mount Druitt
Party	Candidate	Votes	%	±%
Labor	Edmond Atalla	25,460	56.6	+9.4
Liberal	Olivia Lloyd	13,128	29.2	−6.8
Christian Democrats	Josh Green	2,450	5.5	−2.9
Greens	Brent Robertson	2,300	5.1	−2.8
No Land Tax	Robyn Hamilton	1,610	3.6	+3.6
Total formal votes		44,948	94.7	+0.9
Informal votes		2,510	5.3	−0.9
Turnout		47,458	88.5	+0.7
Two-party-preferred result
Labor	Edmond Atalla	26,877	65.5	+9.5
Liberal	Olivia Lloyd	14,191	34.6	−9.5
Labor hold		Swing	+9.5	

== Mulgoa ==
2015 New South Wales state election: Mulgoa
Party	Candidate	Votes	%	±%
Liberal	Tanya Davies	25,709	53.3	−0.2
Labor	Todd Carney	16,909	35.0	+3.6
Christian Democrats	Jennifer Scholfield	2,193	4.5	−0.2
Greens	Kingsley Liu	2,024	4.2	−1.6
No Land Tax	Tania Canto	1,425	3.0	+3.0
Total formal votes		48,260	95.8	+0.7
Informal votes		2,132	4.2	−0.7
Turnout		50,392	93.1	+1.6
Two-party-preferred result
Liberal	Tanya Davies	26,786	59.7	−2.7
Labor	Todd Carney	18,114	40.3	+2.7
Liberal hold		Swing	−2.7	

== Murray ==
2015 New South Wales state election: Murray
Party	Candidate	Votes	%	±%
National	Adrian Piccoli	25,752	55.5	−22.3
Independent Country	Helen Dalton	8,440	18.2	+18.2
Labor	Max Buljubasic	7,509	16.2	−1.3
Independent	Brian Mills	1,745	3.8	+3.8
Greens	Jordanna Glassman	1,035	2.2	−1.1
No Land Tax	Garry Codemo	929	2.0	+2.0
Christian Democrats	David Elder	651	1.4	+0.0
Independent	Atul Misra	337	0.7	+0.7
Total formal votes		46,398	96.3	−0.5
Informal votes		1,801	3.7	+0.5
Turnout		48,199	87.5	−3.7
Notional two-party-preferred count
National	Adrian Piccoli	28,295	75.2	−5.7
Labor	Max Buljubasic	9,329	24.8	+5.7
Two-candidate-preferred result
National	Adrian Piccoli	27,504	72.7	−8.3
Independent Country	Helen Dalton	10,353	27.3	+27.3
National notional hold		Swing	−8.3	

Muray was a new seat combining most of the abolished district of Murrumbidgee and the southern part of the abolished district of Murray-Darling. Adrian Piccoli (National) was the member for Murrumbidgee and the member for Murray-Darling, John Williams (National), was an unsuccessful candidate at the election for the Legislative Council.

== Myall Lakes ==
2015 New South Wales state election: Myall Lakes
Party	Candidate	Votes	%	±%
National	Stephen Bromhead	22,617	46.9	−17.7
Labor	David Keegan	13,483	27.9	+15.2
Independent	Steve Attkins	7,295	15.1	+15.1
Greens	Stephen Ballantine	3,186	6.6	−0.4
Christian Democrats	Andrew Weatherstone	1,158	2.4	+2.4
No Land Tax	Giovina Gouskos	515	1.1	+1.1
Total formal votes		48,254	97.0	+0.2
Informal votes		1,475	3.0	−0.2
Turnout		49,729	90.8	+0.4
Two-party-preferred result
National	Stephen Bromhead	24,370	58.7	−19.9
Labor	David Keegan	17,115	41.3	+19.9
National hold		Swing	−19.9	

== Newcastle ==
2015 New South Wales state election: Newcastle
Party	Candidate	Votes	%	±%
Labor	Tim Crakanthorp	19,324	40.1	+9.1
Liberal	Karen Howard	17,082	35.5	−1.7
Greens	Michael Osborne	8,824	18.3	+3.3
Cyclists	Sam Reich	817	1.7	+1.7
Christian Democrats	Milton Caine	787	1.6	+0.3
No Land Tax	Jasmin Addison	714	1.5	+1.5
Socialist Alliance	Steve O'Brien	601	1.2	−0.2
Total formal votes		48,149	96.3	−0.4
Informal votes		1,837	3.7	+0.4
Turnout		49,986	90.3	+1.1
Two-party-preferred result
Labor	Tim Crakanthorp	24,384	57.4	+9.8
Liberal	Karen Howard	18,116	42.6	−9.8
Labor hold		Swing	+9.8	

== Newtown ==
2015 New South Wales state election: Newtown
Party	Candidate	Votes	%	±%
Greens	Jenny Leong	20,689	45.6	+10.1
Labor	Penny Sharpe	13,978	30.8	+0.4
Liberal	Rachael Wheldall	8,074	17.8	−3.2
Animal Justice	Michael Walsh	989	2.2	+2.2
Cyclists	Noel McFarlane	828	1.8	+1.8
Christian Democrats	Karl Schubert	453	1.0	−0.1
No Land Tax	Dale Dinham	386	0.9	+0.9
Total formal votes		45,397	97.5	+0.1
Informal votes		1,179	2.5	−0.1
Turnout		46,576	86.5	+4.0
Notional two-party-preferred count
Labor	Penny Sharpe	27,526	74.4	+10.4
Liberal	Rachael Wheldall	9,461	25.6	−10.4
Two-candidate-preferred result
Greens	Jenny Leong	22,605	59.3	+4.8
Labor	Penny Sharpe	15,532	40.7	−4.8
Greens notional hold		Swing	+4.8	

Newtown was a new seat, partly replacing the abolished district of Marrickville. The member for Marrickville, Carmel Tebbutt (Labor), did not contest the election. Newtown was a notional Green seat as a result of the redistribution.

== North Shore ==
2015 New South Wales state election: North Shore
Party	Candidate	Votes	%	±%
Liberal	Jillian Skinner	26,853	58.1	−9.3
Greens	Arthur Chesterfield-Evans	6,755	14.6	−5.6
Labor	James Wheeldon	6,378	13.8	+3.0
Independent	Stephen Ruff	4,655	10.1	+10.1
Cyclists	Pip Vice	838	1.8	+1.8
No Land Tax	Moya Kertesz	390	0.8	+0.8
Christian Democrats	Giuseppe Rotiroti	386	0.8	−0.9
Total formal votes		46,255	98.0	+0.4
Informal votes		926	2.0	−0.4
Turnout		47,181	88.2	+0.6
Notional two-party-preferred count
Liberal	Jillian Skinner	28,874	71.9	−8.5
Labor	James Wheeldon	11,278	28.1	+8.5
Two-candidate-preferred result
Liberal	Jillian Skinner	28,613	71.2	−2.1
Greens	Arthur Chesterfield-Evans	11,579	28.8	+2.1
Liberal hold		Swing	−2.1	

== Northern Tablelands ==
2015 New South Wales state election: Northern Tablelands
Party	Candidate	Votes	%	±%
National	Adam Marshall	32,247	66.7	+31.1
Labor	Debra O'Brien	7,573	15.7	+10.7
Independent Country	David Mailler	3,471	7.2	+7.2
Greens	Mercurius Goldstein	3,453	7.1	+3.7
Christian Democrats	Holly Beecham	1,115	2.3	+0.9
No Land Tax	Trevor Gay	489	1.0	+1.0
Total formal votes		48,348	97.8	−0.7
Informal votes		1,082	2.2	+0.7
Turnout		49,430	90.1	−2.4
Two-party-preferred result
National	Adam Marshall	34,077	77.1	−0.6
Labor	Debra O'Brien	10,137	22.9	+0.6
National hold		Swing	−0.6	

== Oatley ==
2015 New South Wales state election: Oatley
Party	Candidate	Votes	%	±%
Liberal	Mark Coure	24,617	51.1	+4.0
Labor	O'Bray Smith	17,536	36.4	−2.6
Greens	Philippa Clark	3,576	7.4	−1.5
Christian Democrats	Wayne Lawrence	1,507	3.1	−1.6
No Land Tax	Dean Eades	894	1.9	+1.9
Total formal votes		48,130	96.7	+0.7
Informal votes		1,617	3.3	−0.7
Turnout		49,747	92.9	−2.3
Two-party-preferred result
Liberal	Mark Coure	25,696	56.6	+2.8
Labor	O'Bray Smith	19,684	43.4	−2.8
Liberal hold		Swing	+2.8	

== Orange ==
2015 New South Wales state election: Orange
Party	Candidate	Votes	%	±%
National	Andrew Gee	31,998	65.6	+8.4
Labor	Bernard Fitzsimon	11,394	23.4	+11.5
Greens	Janelle Bicknell	3,295	6.8	+2.3
Christian Democrats	John Gilbert	1,262	2.6	+2.6
No Land Tax	Juan Fernandez	837	1.7	+1.7
Total formal votes		48,786	97.1	−0.1
Informal votes		1,440	2.9	+0.1
Turnout		50,226	91.5	−2.9
Two-party-preferred result
National	Andrew Gee	33,202	71.7	−5.4
Labor	Bernard Fitzsimon	13,105	28.3	+5.4
National hold		Swing	−5.4	

== Oxley ==
2015 New South Wales state election: Oxley
Party	Candidate	Votes	%	±%
National	Melinda Pavey	24,504	52.7	−14.2
Labor	Fran Armitage	12,414	26.7	+14.1
Greens	Carol Vernon	7,032	15.1	+2.8
Christian Democrats	John Klose	1,382	3.0	+1.2
No Land Tax	Joe Costa	1,187	2.6	+2.6
Total formal votes		46,519	96.7	−0.6
Informal votes		1,588	3.3	+0.6
Turnout		48,107	89.1	−1.3
Two-party-preferred result
National	Melinda Pavey	25,636	60.9	−17.9
Labor	Fran Armitage	16,454	39.1	+17.9
National hold		Swing	−17.9	

== Parramatta ==
2015 New South Wales state election: Parramatta
Party	Candidate	Votes	%	±%
Liberal	Geoff Lee	25,559	53.8	+5.3
Labor	James Shaw	13,649	28.8	+1.4
Greens	Phil Bradley	3,978	8.4	−0.3
Christian Democrats	Kamal Boutros	1,603	3.4	−0.7
Independent OLC	Michelle Garrard	1,519	3.2	+3.2
No Land Tax	Frank Arduca	672	1.4	+1.4
Communist League	Joanne Kuniansky	490	1.0	+0.7
Total formal votes		47,470	96.3	+0.8
Informal votes		1,812	3.7	−0.8
Turnout		49,282	89.3	+5.1
Two-party-preferred result
Liberal	Geoff Lee	26,932	62.9	+0.3
Labor	James Shaw	15,910	37.1	−0.3
Liberal hold		Swing	+0.3	

== Penrith ==
2015 New South Wales state election: Penrith
Party	Candidate	Votes	%	±%
Liberal	Stuart Ayres	21,712	45.6	−8.7
Labor	Emma Husar	15,632	32.9	+7.0
Independent	Jackie Kelly	4,272	9.0	+9.0
Greens	Mark O'Sullivan	2,633	5.5	−3.7
Christian Democrats	May Spencer	1,856	3.9	−1.7
No Land Tax	Angelo Pezzano	949	2.0	+2.0
Australia First	Victor Waterson	322	0.7	+0.7
Socialist Equality	Carolyn Kennett	202	0.4	+0.4
Total formal votes		47,578	96.0	+0.2
Informal votes		1,995	4.0	−0.2
Turnout		49,573	91.5	−0.2
Two-party-preferred result
Liberal	Stuart Ayres	23,212	56.2	−9.9
Labor	Emma Husar	18,061	43.8	+9.9
Liberal hold		Swing	−9.9	

== Pittwater ==
2015 New South Wales state election: Pittwater
Party	Candidate	Votes	%	±%
Liberal	Rob Stokes	32,761	67.8	−4.2
Greens	Felicity Davis	7,780	16.1	−0.7
Labor	Kieren Ash	6,167	12.8	+3.8
Christian Democrats	Zoran Curcic	886	1.8	−0.4
No Land Tax	Rebecca Arduca	751	1.6	+1.6
Total formal votes		48,345	97.6	+0.3
Informal votes		1,202	2.4	−0.3
Turnout		49,547	91.3	+2.1
Notional two-party-preferred count
Liberal	Rob Stokes	34,015	77.9	−6.6
Labor	Kieren Ash	9,653	22.1	+6.6
Two-candidate-preferred result
Liberal	Rob Stokes	33,706	75.7	−2.3
Greens	Felicity Davis	10,847	24.4	+2.3
Liberal hold		Swing	−2.3	

== Port Macquarie ==
2015 New South Wales state election: Port Macquarie
Party	Candidate	Votes	%	±%
National	Leslie Williams	30,567	62.1	+9.7
Labor	Kristy Quill	11,866	24.1	+18.4
Greens	Drusi Megget	4,384	8.9	+5.2
Christian Democrats	Ashley Prinable	1,572	3.2	+1.1
No Land Tax	Paul Grasso	845	1.7	+1.7
Total formal votes		49,234	97.2	−0.9
Informal votes		1,426	2.8	+0.9
Turnout		50,660	91.5	+1.6
Two-party-preferred result
National	Leslie Williams	31,699	69.0	−9.8
Labor	Kristy Quill	14,272	31.1	+9.8
National hold		Swing	−9.8	

== Port Stephens ==
2015 New South Wales state election: Port Stephens
Party	Candidate	Votes	%	±%
Labor	Kate Washington	22,161	47.1	+20.4
Liberal	Ken Jordan	19,265	41.0	−12.1
Greens	Rochelle Flood	3,132	6.7	−1.4
No Land Tax	Joe Shirley	1,331	2.8	+2.8
Christian Democrats	Peter Arena	1,149	2.4	+0.2
Total formal votes		47,038	96.7	+0.2
Informal votes		1,610	3.3	−0.2
Turnout		48,648	92.3	+3.0
Two-party-preferred result
Labor	Kate Washington	24,221	54.7	+19.5
Liberal	Ken Jordan	20,045	45.3	−19.5
Labor gain from Liberal		Swing	+19.5	

== Prospect ==
2015 New South Wales state election: Prospect
Party	Candidate	Votes	%	±%
Labor	Hugh McDermott	21,156	44.8	+4.3
Liberal	Andrew Rohan	18,158	38.5	−3.8
Christian Democrats	Sam Georgis	3,351	7.1	−0.2
Greens	Sujan Selventhiran	3,214	6.8	−0.4
No Land Tax	Angelo Esposito	1,345	2.8	+2.8
Total formal votes		47,224	95.2	+0.8
Informal votes		2,393	4.8	−0.8
Turnout		49,617	91.4	+2.6
Two-party-preferred result
Labor	Hugh McDermott	22,946	53.4	+4.5
Liberal	Andrew Rohan	20,027	46.6	−4.5
Labor notional gain from Liberal		Swing	+4.5	

Prospect was a new seat largely replacing the abolished district of Smithfield. Andrew Rohan (Liberal) was the member for Smithfield.

== Riverstone ==
2015 New South Wales state election: Riverstone
Party	Candidate	Votes	%	±%
Liberal	Kevin Conolly	25,918	55.2	−3.2
Labor	Ian Morrison	14,819	31.6	+7.9
Greens	Rob Vail	2,541	5.4	+0.0
Christian Democrats	Allan Green	2,525	5.4	+0.7
No Land Tax	Karen Cacciotti	1,152	2.5	+2.5
Total formal votes		46,955	96.8	+1.3
Informal votes		1,549	3.2	−1.3
Turnout		48,504	93.0	+4.6
Two-party-preferred result
Liberal	Kevin Conolly	27,065	62.2	−7.8
Labor	Ian Morrison	16,418	37.8	+7.8
Liberal hold		Swing	−7.8	

== Rockdale ==
2015 New South Wales state election: Rockdale
Party	Candidate	Votes	%	±%
Labor	Steve Kamper	21,242	45.9	+9.6
Liberal	John Flowers	18,182	39.3	−4.0
Greens	Madeleina Snowdon	3,194	6.9	−1.9
Christian Democrats	Lena El-Daghl	1,498	3.2	−1.0
No Land Tax	Sam Choker	1,154	2.5	+2.5
Independent	Jamal Daoud	1,009	2.2	+2.2
Total formal votes		46,279	95.6	+0.1
Informal votes		2,132	4.4	−0.1
Turnout		48,411	90.0	+0.2
Two-party-preferred result
Labor	Steve Kamper	23,121	54.8	+8.3
Liberal	John Flowers	19,107	45.3	−8.3
Labor gain from Liberal		Swing	+8.3	

== Ryde ==
2015 New South Wales state election: Ryde
Party	Candidate	Votes	%	±%
Liberal	Victor Dominello	25,950	53.7	−8.5
Labor	Jerome Laxale	13,958	28.9	+11.7
Greens	Justin Alick	5,548	11.5	+1.9
Christian Democrats	Julie Worsley	2,034	4.2	+0.1
No Land Tax	Joe Cacciotti	806	1.7	+1.7
Total formal votes		48,296	97.0	+0.1
Informal votes		1,512	3.0	−0.1
Turnout		49,808	91.3	+2.8
Two-party-preferred result
Liberal	Victor Dominello	27,516	61.5	−13.7
Labor	Jerome Laxale	17,215	38.5	+13.7
Liberal hold		Swing	−13.7	

== Seven Hills ==
2015 New South Wales state election: Seven Hills
Party	Candidate	Votes	%	±%
Liberal	Mark Taylor	23,789	49.7	+1.3
Labor	Susai Benjamin	15,580	32.5	−0.5
Greens	Balaji Naranapatti	3,414	7.1	−0.5
Christian Democrats	Brendon Prentice	2,170	4.5	−0.3
Independent	Leonard Brown	1,132	2.4	+2.4
No Land Tax	Jennifer Sheahan	1,051	2.2	+2.2
Independent	Indira Devi	744	1.6	+1.6
Total formal votes		47,880	96.1	+0.1
Informal votes		1,927	3.9	−0.1
Turnout		49,807	91.8	+0.3
Two-party-preferred result
Liberal	Mark Taylor	25,337	58.8	−0.0
Labor	Susai Benjamin	17,791	41.3	+0.0
Liberal notional hold		Swing	−0.0	

== Shellharbour ==
2015 New South Wales state election: Shellharbour
Party	Candidate	Votes	%	±%
Labor	Anna Watson	26,897	52.7	+7.2
Liberal	Mark Jones	13,125	25.7	−6.0
Greens	Peter Moran	4,751	9.3	−5.2
Independent	Wayne Quinn	2,266	4.4	+4.4
Independent	Romeo Cecchele	1,596	3.1	+3.1
Christian Democrats	John Kadwell	1,489	2.9	−3.4
No Land Tax	Hugo Morvillo	875	1.7	+1.7
Total formal votes		50,999	95.6	+0.7
Informal votes		2,364	4.4	−0.7
Turnout		53,363	91.8	−0.7
Two-party-preferred result
Labor	Anna Watson	29,678	67.0	+9.2
Liberal	Mark Jones	14,640	33.0	−9.2
Labor hold		Swing	+9.2	

== South Coast ==
2015 New South Wales state election: South Coast
Party	Candidate	Votes	%	±%
Liberal	Shelley Hancock	24,040	52.5	−7.5
Labor	Fiona Phillips	13,915	30.4	+7.8
Greens	Amanda Findley	5,927	12.9	−0.1
Christian Democrats	Matt Rose	1,208	2.6	−1.8
No Land Tax	Licio Mallia	706	1.5	+1.5
Total formal votes		45,796	96.9	+0.9
Informal votes		1,458	3.1	−0.9
Turnout		47,254	90.2	−1.2
Two-party-preferred result
Liberal	Shelley Hancock	25,136	59.6	−10.5
Labor	Fiona Phillips	17,026	40.4	+10.5
Liberal hold		Swing	−10.5	

== Strathfield ==
2015 New South Wales state election: Strathfield
Party	Candidate	Votes	%	±%
Liberal	Charles Casuscelli	19,884	42.7	−5.1
Labor	Jodi McKay	19,721	42.4	+7.4
Greens	Lance Dale	4,292	9.2	−1.9
Christian Democrats	David Brook	1,573	3.4	+0.0
No Land Tax	Stephen Chehab	1,092	2.3	+2.3
Total formal votes		46,562	96.8	+0.1
Informal votes		1,523	3.2	−0.1
Turnout		48,085	90.7	+2.6
Two-party-preferred result
Labor	Jodi McKay	22,371	51.8	+8.2
Liberal	Charles Casuscelli	20,829	48.2	−8.2
Labor gain from Liberal		Swing	+8.2	

== Summer Hill ==
2015 New South Wales state election: Summer Hill
Party	Candidate	Votes	%	±%
Labor	Jo Haylen	20,370	43.3	+1.5
Greens	Max Phillips	12,856	27.3	+3.0
Liberal	Julie Passas	11,216	23.8	−4.4
No Land Tax	Don Tauriello	855	1.8	+1.8
Christian Democrats	Kylie French	799	1.7	−0.3
Socialist Alliance	Susan Price	694	1.5	+1.5
	James Cogan	287	0.6	+0.6
Total formal votes		47,077	96.7	+0.5
Informal votes		1,625	3.3	−0.5
Turnout		48,702	89.9	−1.4
Notional two-party-preferred count
Labor	Jo Haylen	28,608	70.1	+7.5
Liberal	Julie Passas	12,183	29.9	−7.5
Two-candidate-preferred result
Labor	Jo Haylen	22,148	60.5	−2.1
Greens	Max Phillips	14,440	39.5	+2.1
Labor notional hold		Swing	−2.1	

Summer Hill was a new seat, combining part of the abolished district of Marrickville with parts of Canterbury, Strathfield and Balmain. The member for Marrickville, Carmel Tebbutt (Labor), did not contest the election. Summer Hill was a notional Labor seat as a result of the redistribution.

== Swansea ==
2015 New South Wales state election: Swansea
Party	Candidate	Votes	%	±%
Labor	Yasmin Catley	21,712	45.0	+8.8
Liberal	Johanna Uidam	12,493	25.9	−11.4
Independent	Garry Edwards	6,484	13.4	+13.4
Greens	Phillipa Parsons	2,818	5.8	−2.9
Animal Justice	Joshua Agland	1,402	2.9	+2.9
Independent	Chris Osborne	1,360	2.8	+2.8
Christian Democrats	Luke Cubis	1,322	2.7	+0.3
No Land Tax	Paul Doughty	624	1.3	+1.3
Total formal votes		48,215	96.3	−0.1
Informal votes		1,850	3.7	+0.1
Turnout		50,065	92.0	+0.8
Two-party-preferred result
Labor	Yasmin Catley	24,148	63.0	+13.3
Liberal	Johanna Uidam	14,192	37.0	−13.3
Labor gain from Liberal		Swing	+13.3	

== Sydney ==
2015 New South Wales state election: Sydney
Party	Candidate	Votes	%	±%
Independent	Alex Greenwich	16,947	39.6	+39.6
Liberal	Patrice Pandeleos	14,037	32.8	−6.1
Labor	Edwina Lloyd	6,303	14.7	+4.3
Greens	Chris Brentin	4,156	9.7	−2.6
No Land Tax	David Pelzman	495	1.2	+1.2
Christian Democrats	Elaine Addae	367	0.9	−0.2
Centre	Joanna Rzetelski	230	0.5	+0.5
Independent	Victor Taffa	213	0.5	+0.5
Total formal votes		42,748	97.6	+0.4
Informal votes		1,047	2.4	−0.4
Turnout		43,795	82.5	+4.6
Notional two-party-preferred count
Liberal	Patrice Pandeleos	16,212	56.7	−11.3
Labor	Edwina Lloyd	12,401	43.3	+11.3
Two-candidate-preferred result
Independent	Alex Greenwich	20,612	58.1	+7.8
Liberal	Patrice Pandeleos	14,885	41.9	−7.8
Independent hold		Swing	+7.8	

== Tamworth ==
2015 New South Wales state election: Tamworth
Party	Candidate	Votes	%	±%
National	Kevin Anderson	26,990	55.1	+0.9
Independent	Peter Draper	16,855	34.4	–4.2
Labor	Joe Hillard	2,831	5.8	+1.2
Greens	Pat Schultz	1,047	2.1	+0.6
Christian Democrats	Michelle Ryan	655	1.3	+1.3
No Land Tax	Richard Nock	319	0.7	+0.7
	Stan Heuston	314	0.6	+0.6
Total formal votes		49,011	97.7	−0.5
Informal votes		1,156	2.3	+0.5
Turnout		50,167	92.2	+0.6
Notional two-party-preferred count
National	Kevin Anderson	30,783	78.9	−1.8
Labor	Joe Hillard	8,215	21.1	+1.8
Two-candidate-preferred result
National	Kevin Anderson	27,777	60.0	+3.2
Independent	Peter Draper	18,491	40.0	−3.2
National hold		Swing	+3.2	

== Terrigal ==
2015 New South Wales state election: Terrigal
Party	Candidate	Votes	%	±%
Liberal	Adam Crouch	25,297	51.8	−8.7
Labor	Jeff Sundstrom	15,338	31.4	+13.2
Greens	Doug Williamson	5,782	11.8	−1.6
Christian Democrats	Murray Byrnes	1,564	3.2	+0.2
No Land Tax	Nadia Ruben	894	1.8	+1.8
Total formal votes		48,875	96.8	+0.0
Informal votes		1,626	3.2	−0.0
Turnout		50,501	91.0	+0.8
Two-party-preferred result
Liberal	Adam Crouch	26,526	59.0	−14.6
Labor	Jeff Sundstrom	18,420	41.0	+14.6
Liberal hold		Swing	−14.6	

== The Entrance ==
2015 New South Wales state election: The Entrance
Party	Candidate	Votes	%	±%
Liberal	Michael Sharpe	21,049	43.9	−6.7
Labor	David Mehan	20,086	41.9	+12.0
Greens	Scott Rickard	4,493	9.4	−1.4
Christian Democrats	Hadden Ervin	1,301	2.7	−1.7
No Land Tax	Sonia Lopreiato	1,031	2.1	+2.1
Total formal votes		47,960	96.3	+0.5
Informal votes		1,850	3.7	−0.5
Turnout		49,810	90.5	+0.5
Two-party-preferred result
Labor	David Mehan	22,392	50.4	+12.1
Liberal	Michael Sharpe	22,054	49.6	−12.1
Labor gain from Liberal		Swing	+12.1	

== Tweed ==
2015 New South Wales state election: Tweed
Party	Candidate	Votes	%	±%
National	Geoff Provest	20,800	47.1	−15.0
Labor	Ron Goodman	15,867	35.9	+14.5
Greens	Andrea Vickers	5,864	13.3	−0.8
No Land Tax	Kerrie Collins	1,042	2.4	+2.4
Christian Democrats	Michael Sichel	618	1.4	−1.1
Total formal votes		44,191	96.6	+0.4
Informal votes		1,569	3.4	−0.4
Turnout		45,760	85.5	+1.0
Two-party-preferred result
National	Geoff Provest	21,508	53.2	−18.5
Labor	Ron Goodman	18,931	46.8	+18.5
National hold		Swing	−18.5	

== Upper Hunter ==
2015 New South Wales state election: Upper Hunter
Party	Candidate	Votes	%	±%
National	Michael Johnsen	18,384	38.9	−15.6
Labor	Martin Rush	15,387	32.5	+14.3
Independent	Lee Watts	9,170	19.4	+19.4
Greens	John Kaye	2,608	5.5	−0.1
Christian Democrats	Richard Stretton	1,003	2.1	−0.3
No Land Tax	Louisa Checchin	744	1.6	+1.6
Total formal votes		47,296	96.9	+0.4
Informal votes		1,506	3.1	−0.4
Turnout		48,802	91.2	+0.2
Two-party-preferred result
National	Michael Johnsen	20,496	52.2	−20.8
Labor	Martin Rush	18,764	47.8	+20.8
National hold		Swing	−20.8	

== Vaucluse ==
2015 New South Wales state election: Vaucluse
Party	Candidate	Votes	%	±%
Liberal	Gabrielle Upton	30,257	65.6	−4.2
Greens	Megan McEwin	8,559	18.5	+0.3
Labor	Gloria Nicol	6,090	13.2	+2.5
No Land Tax	Susanne Gervay	854	1.9	+1.9
Christian Democrats	Beresford Thomas	387	0.8	−0.4
Total formal votes		46,147	97.6	+0.8
Informal votes		1,155	2.4	−0.8
Turnout		47,302	85.2	−0.2
Notional two-party-preferred count
Liberal	Gabrielle Upton	31,493	75.3	−6.1
Labor	Gloria Nicol	10,331	24.7	+6.1
Two-candidate-preferred result
Liberal	Gabrielle Upton	31,118	72.9	−3.2
Greens	Megan McEwin	11,551	27.1	+3.2
Liberal hold		Swing	−3.2	

== Wagga Wagga ==
2015 New South Wales state election: Wagga Wagga
Party	Candidate	Votes	%	±%
Liberal	Daryl Maguire	25,061	53.8	+0.2
Labor	Dan Hayes	13,084	28.1	+18.0
Independent Country	Paul Funnell	4,523	9.7	+9.7
Greens	Kevin Poynter	2,320	5.0	+1.6
Christian Democrats	Keith Pech	1,111	2.4	+0.0
No Land Tax	Joe Sidoti	515	1.1	+1.1
Total formal votes		46,614	96.8	−0.6
Informal votes		1,548	3.2	+0.6
Turnout		48,162	90.3	+0.4
Two-party-preferred result
Liberal	Daryl Maguire	26,704	62.9	−14.9
Labor	Dan Hayes	15,756	37.1	+14.9
Liberal hold		Swing	−14.9	

== Wakehurst ==
2015 New South Wales state election: Wakehurst
Party	Candidate	Votes	%	±%
Liberal	Brad Hazzard	30,611	63.9	−5.5
Labor	Ned Barsi	7,387	15.4	+2.4
Greens	Jonathan King	5,727	12.0	−2.8
Independent	Conny Harris	2,057	4.3	+4.3
Christian Democrats	Silvana Nero	1,259	2.6	−0.2
No Land Tax	Robert Di Cosmo	853	1.8	+1.8
Total formal votes		47,894	96.5	+0.1
Informal votes		1,712	3.5	−0.1
Turnout		49,606	91.6	+0.5
Two-party-preferred result
Liberal	Brad Hazzard	32,105	75.2	−5.3
Labor	Ned Barsi	10,565	24.8	+5.3
Liberal hold		Swing	−5.3	

== Wallsend ==
2015 New South Wales state election: Wallsend
Party	Candidate	Votes	%	±%
Labor	Sonia Hornery	29,034	58.4	+19.5
Liberal	Hannah Eves	12,291	24.7	−2.2
Greens	Aleona Swegen	5,330	10.7	+2.2
Christian Democrats	Damien Cotton	1,706	3.4	+1.3
No Land Tax	Tony Di Cosmo	1,341	2.7	+2.7
Total formal votes		49,702	96.1	+0.4
Informal votes		2,031	3.9	−0.4
Turnout		51,733	91.6	−0.1
Two-party-preferred result
Labor	Sonia Hornery	32,124	70.8	+14.5
Liberal	Hannah Eves	13,246	29.2	−14.5
Labor hold		Swing	+14.5	

== Willoughby ==
2015 New South Wales state election: Willoughby
Party	Candidate	Votes	%	±%
Liberal	Gladys Berejiklian	30,066	63.6	−5.4
Greens	Alison Haines	7,511	15.9	−0.9
Labor	Peter Cavanagh	7,507	15.9	+3.8
Cyclists	Edward Re	845	1.8	+1.8
Christian Democrats	Melody Ho	719	1.5	−0.7
No Land Tax	Aldo Di Santo	662	1.4	+1.4
Total formal votes		47,310	97.6	+0.4
Informal votes		1,186	2.4	−0.4
Turnout		48,496	90.4	+2.3
Notional two-party-preferred count
Liberal	Gladys Berejiklian	31,481	73.8	−6.6
Labor	Peter Cavanagh	11,163	26.2	+6.6
Two-candidate-preferred result
Liberal	Gladys Berejiklian	31,324	74.5	−3.2
Greens	Alison Haines	10,739	25.5	+3.2
Liberal hold		Swing	−3.2	

== Wollondilly ==
2015 New South Wales state election: Wollondilly
Party	Candidate	Votes	%	±%
Liberal	Jai Rowell	27,345	58.0	+2.1
Labor	Ciaran O'Brien	11,429	24.2	+5.3
Greens	Patrick Darley-Jones	3,957	8.4	+1.1
Independent	Lynette Styles	1,821	3.9	+3.9
Christian Democrats	Susan Pinsuti	1,559	3.3	−0.2
No Land Tax	Maria Foia	1,073	2.3	+2.3
Total formal votes		47,184	96.2	+0.5
Informal votes		1,844	3.8	−0.5
Turnout		49,028	92.9	−0.2
Two-party-preferred result
Liberal	Jai Rowell	28,795	67.3	−4.3
Labor	Ciaran O'Brien	13,994	32.7	+4.3
Liberal hold		Swing	−4.3	

== Wollongong ==
2015 New South Wales state election: Wollongong
Party	Candidate	Votes	%	±%
Labor	Noreen Hay	20,071	40.4	+3.6
Liberal	Cameron Walters	10,465	21.0	−0.1
Independent	Arthur Rorris	10,162	20.4	+20.4
Greens	Mitchell Bresser	4,747	9.5	−0.2
No Land Tax	Noreen Colonelli	2,197	4.4	+4.4
Christian Democrats	Clarrie Pratt	1,463	2.9	+0.4
Cyclists	Phil Latz	613	1.2	+1.2
Total formal votes		49,718	95.9	+0.2
Informal votes		2,123	4.1	−0.2
Turnout		51,841	89.1	−1.9
Notional two-party-preferred count
Labor	Noreen Hay	24,326	63.4	+4.2
Liberal	Cameron Walters	14,019	36.6	−4.2
Two-candidate-preferred result
Labor	Noreen Hay	22,293	58.9	+4.3
Independent	Arthur Rorris	15,556	41.1	+41.1
Labor hold		Swing	+4.3	

== Wyong ==
2015 New South Wales state election: Wyong
Party	Candidate	Votes	%	±%
Labor	David Harris	23,565	51.1	+13.2
Liberal	Sandra Kerr	16,936	36.8	−10.5
Greens	Vicki Dimond	3,091	6.7	−3.6
No Land Tax	Annie McGeechan	929	2.0	+2.0
Christian Democrats	Stevan Dragojevic	914	2.0	−1.2
Socialist Equality	Noel Holt	384	0.8	+0.8
Australia First	Alex Norwick	252	0.5	+0.5
Total formal votes		46,071	95.7	+0.1
Informal votes		2,082	4.3	−0.1
Turnout		48,153	90.7	+3.5
Two-party-preferred result
Labor	David Harris	25,037	58.7	+13.3
Liberal	Sandra Kerr	17,597	41.3	−13.3
Labor gain from Liberal		Swing	+13.3	
