= Results of the 2011 New South Wales Legislative Council election =

Legislative Council election for New South Wales, Australia in March 2011

2011 New South Wales state election (Legislative Council)
← 2007	26 March 2011	2015 →

21 of the 42 seats in the Legislative Council 21 seats needed for a majority

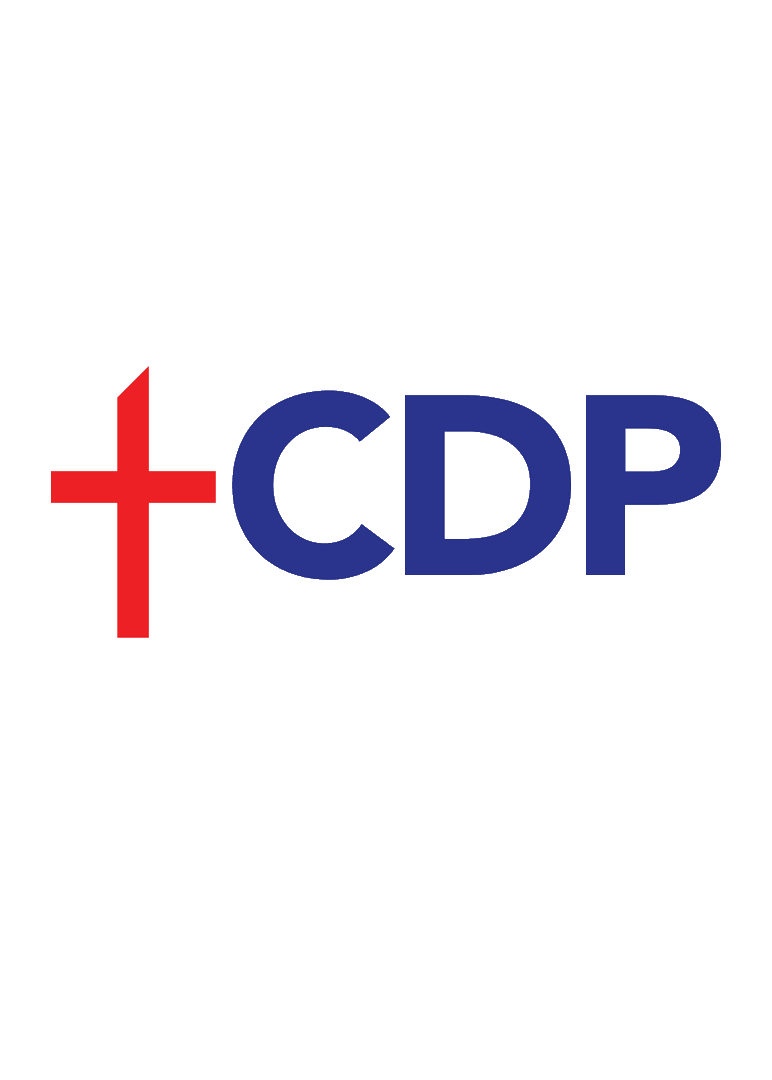
	First party	Second party	Third party
	L/NP
Leader	Mike Gallacher	John Hatzistergos	None
Party	Coalition	Labor	Greens
Seats before	15	19	4
Seats won	11	5	3
Seats after	19	14	5
Seat change	▲4	▼5	▲1
Popular vote	1,943,246	967,242	453,125
Percentage	47.7%	23.7%	11.1%
Swing	▲13.5pp	▼15.4pp	▲2.0pp
	Fourth party	Fifth party
	SFF
Leader	Robert Borsak	Fred Nile
Party	SFF	Christian Democrats
Seats before	2	2
Seats won	1	1
Seats after	2	2
Seat change	Steady	Steady
Popular vote	150,741	127,233
Percentage	3.7%	3.1%
Swing	▲0.9pp	▼1.3pp

This is a list of results for the Legislative Council at the 2011 New South Wales state election.

== Results ==
2011 New South Wales state election: Legislative Council
Party	Candidate	Votes	%	±%
Quota		185,274		
Liberal/National Coalition	1. Mike Gallacher (Lib) (elected 1); 2. Duncan Gay (Nat) (elected 4); 3. Greg Pearce (Lib) (elected 7); 4. David Clarke (Lib) (elected 9); 5. Rick Colless (Nat) (elected 11); 6. Scot MacDonald (Lib) (elected 13); 7. Catherine Cusack (Lib) (elected 14); 8. Natasha Maclaren-Jones (Lib) (elected 15); 9. Peter Phelps (Lib) (elected 16); 10. Niall Blair (Nat) (elected 17); 11. Sarah Johnston (Nat) (elected 21); 12. Henson Liang (Lib); 13. Andy Heath (Lib); 14. Lili Gestakovska (Lib); 15. Ben Tyson (Nat)	1,943,246	47.68	+13.46
Labor	1. Eric Roozendaal (elected 2); 2. Greg Donnelly (elected 5); 3. Penny Sharpe (elected 8); 4. Peter Primrose (elected 10); 5. Tony Kelly (elected 12); 6. Andrew Ferguson; 7. Natalie Bradbury; 8. Ernest Wong; 9. Nizza Siano; 10. Sue Fletcher; 11. Alexandra Cowan; 12. Richard Smolenski; 13. Glenn Kolomeitz; 14. Michelle Miran; 15. Anna Minns; 16. John Knight; 17. John Rumble; 18. Kien Ly	967,242	23.73	−15.41
Greens	1. David Shoebridge (elected 3); 2. Jan Barham (elected 6); 3. Jeremy Buckingham (elected 20); 4. Lesa de Leau; 5. Chris Harris; 6. Brami Jegatheeswaran; 7. Terri Latella; 8. Brian Mason; 9. Lynne Saville; 10. Leonard Chin; 11. Catherine Moore; 12. Bronislava Lee; 13. Alex Surace; 14. Anne Marett; 15. Anthony Petrolo; 16. Jan Davis; 17. Melissa Brooks; 18. Jason Koh; 19. Pauline Tyrrell; 20. Joel Macrae; 21. Sandra Heilpern	453,125	11.12	+2.00
Shooters and Fishers	1. Robert Brown (elected 18); 2. Jim Muirhead; 3. Max Castle; 4. Pauline Smith; 5. Tony McManus; 6. Al McGlashan; 7. Col Allison; 8. John Featherstone; 9. Steve Lee; 10. Alain Noujaim; 11. Kath Clapham; 12. Arthur Baker; 13. Darren Higgins; 14. Karl Houseman; 15. Peter Saunders; 16. Ron Wakem; 17. David Cook; 18. Bob Shaw	150,741	3.70	+0.90
Christian Democrats	1. Paul Green (elected 19); 2. Robyn Peebles; 3. Graham Freemantle; 4. Max Cracknell; 5. Elaine Nile; 6. Magdi Hanna; 7. Ian Smith; 8. Elwyn Sheppard; 9. David Fraser; 10. Anita Bird; 11. Eddie Cropper; 12. Michelle Green; 13. Trisha Ellis; 14. Devon Chapman; 15. Graeme Young; 16. Bruce Watson; 17. Diana Thew; 18. Gamil Heimy-Kostandy; 19. Soon-Hyung Kwon; 20. Ula Falanga	127,233	3.12	−1.30
Independent	1. Pauline Hanson; 2. Brian Burston; 3. Graham Abel; 4. Kate McCulloch; 5. David Taylor; 6. Alan Cronin; 7. Michael Parsons; 8. Rosalyn Wright; 9. John Cantwell; 10. Ed Farnsworth; 11. Sharon Elwell; 12. Andy Frew; 13. David Seccombe; 14. Stephen Mulcahy; 15. Kenneth Dibsdale; 16. Bev Wallis	98,043	2.41	+2.41
Family First	1. Gordon Moyes; 2. Phil Lamb; 3. Gregory Swane; 4. Joseph Mack; 5. Ken Duncan; 6. John Millard; 7. Sam Habashy; 8. Graham Guy; 9. Richard Menteith; 10. Nett Knox; 11. Grace Sham; 12. Nancy Piggott; 13. Patricia Giles; 14. Arnold Gorrell; 15. Wayne Koivu; 16. Ken Scott; 17. Gavin Brett; 18. Johnny Teong; 19. Rejieli Flexman	59,640	1.46	+1.46
Fishing Party	1. Bob Smith; 2. Elizabeth Stocker; 3. Chris Goodbar; 4. Deanne Shepherd; 5. Russell Bond; 6. Bob Sieber; 7. Ted Mackay; 8. Vicki Johns; 9. Stewart Paterson; 10. Kevin Johnson; 11. Brian Sutton; 12. Alison Johnstone; 13. Paul Derrick; 14. Adrian Callaghan; 15. Michael O'Connor; 16. Frank Bills; 17. Craig McCartney; 18. Margaret Hare; 19. Rowan Phelps; 20. David Hitchcock; 21. Matthew Small	54,253	1.33	−0.20
John Hatton's Independent Team	1. John Hatton; 2. Ian Scandrett; 3. John McInerney; 4. Tony Brown; 5. David Swan; 6. Mike King; 7. Debra Wales; 8. Sandra Wilson; 9. Peter Cipollone; 10. Joe Nagy; 11. Dianne Allen; 12. Edgar Azzopardi; 13. Julie Head; 14. Darren Boehm; 15. Deborah Richards; 16. Chris Gibson; 17. John Stephens; 18. Alan Hunt; 19. Lindsay Fuller; 20. Mark Corrigan; 21. Meg Bishop	52,514	1.29	+1.29
No Parking Meters	1. Charles Matthews; 2. Robert Morris; 3. David Johnson; 4. Sirena Beveridge; 5. Troy Seelin; 6. Caroline Schlee; 7. Dale Ayshford; 8. Helen Patterson; 9. Robert Braid; 10. Joyce McDonnell; 11. Kevin Barron; 12. John Fleming; 13. Michael Morrisey; 14. Susan Bisaro; 15. John Shaw; 16. Louise Morrisey; 17. Carol Matthews; 18. Carolyn Beveridge	49,429	1.21	+1.21
Democrats	1. Arthur Chesterfield-Evans; 2. Ronaldo Villaver; 3. Dean Winter; 4. Glenn Luxford; 5. Brett Paterson; 6. Casey Balk; 7. Pamela Clifford; 8. Robert McFarlane; 9. Perry Garofani; 10. Carolyn Hastie; 11. John Haydon; 12. Georgina Johanson; 13. Mayo Materazzo; 14. Julia Melland; 15. David Robinson; 16. Carol Prendergast; 17. Jaeme Serpanchy; 18. Samantha Elliott-Halls	34,046	0.84	−0.95
Outdoor Recreation	1. David Leyonhjelm; 2. Peter Whelan; 3. Martin Walsh; 4. Fay Destry; 5. Ian Best; 6. James Whelan; 7. Jennifer Rose; 8. John Phibbs; 9. Bob Hennessy; 10. Angelique Pettett; 11. Virginia Kruse; 12. Lucy Gabb; 13. Jason Kent; 14. Graham Nickols; 15. Robert Dolphin; 16. Janos Beregszaszi	31,279	0.77	+0.20
Restore the Workers' Rights	1. Barry Gissell; 2. Clifford Waiford; 3. Amanda Goodwin; 4. Jody Gissell; 5. Toni Griffis; 6. Peter Squires; 7. Anthony Adams; 8. Donna Adams; 9. Irene Wilson; 10. Maureen Cross; 11. Amanda Radburn; 12. Yvonne King; 13. David McCabe; 14. Kelly Slater; 15. Rodney Slater	17,661	0.43	−0.49
Save Our State	1. Tony Recsei; 2. Monica Wangmann; 3. Gordon Hocking; 4. Ted Webber; 5. Jean Posen; 6. John Ward; 7. Barry Hadaway; 8. Colin Freeman; 9. Rosemary Hadaway; 10. Tony Meaney; 11. Tanya Wood; 12. Margaretha van Gennip; 13. Jennifer Bennett; 14. Pat Cameron; 15. Mary Minns; 16. Allan Butt; 17. Hugh Knox; 18. Robert Hochmann	13,579	0.33	+0.02
Socialist Alliance	1. Peter Boyle; 2. Jess Moore; 3. Luis Almario; 4. Susan Prince; 5. Ibrahim Barssi; 6. Bea Bielle; 7. Raul Bassi; 8. Simon Cunich; 9. Rachel Evans; 10. Ross Geary; 11. John Coleman; 12. Steve O'Brien; 13. Kate Ausburn; 14. Patrick Harrison; 15. Federico Fuentes; 16. Luis Olaya; 17. Jill Hickson; 18. Duroyan Fertl; 19. Stefan Skibicki; 20. Terry Townsend; 21. Simon Butler	10,619	0.26	−0.14
Building Australia	1. Ray Brown; 2. Michael O'Donnell; 3. Liz Tomlinson; 4. John Fransen; 5. Maureen Riordan; 6. Alan Smith; 7. Louise Williams; 8. Ross Trovato; 9. Shiyun Chen; 10. John Zhang; 11. Kieron Farrell; 12. John Baiada; 13. Domenic Cammareri; 14. John White; 15. Robert Pickett; 16. John Vellenga; 17. Brett Walter; 18. Ron Gattone	9,058	0.22	+0.22
Independent	James Liu	1,220	0.03	+0.03
Independent	Ramsay Nuthall	612	0.02	+0.02
Sex Party	Huw Campbell	465	0.01	+0.01
Independent	Darren Marton	446	0.01	+0.01
Independent	June Esposito	208	0.01	+0.01
Independent	Danny Lim	192	0.00	0.00
Independent	Kyrsty MacDonald	189	0.00	0.00
United We Stand	Ben Smith	187	0.00	+0.00
Independent	Richard Stanton	157	0.00	0.00
Independent	Jennifer Stefanac	119	0.00	0.00
Help Fix NSW	Robert Peake	103	0.00	+0.00
Independent	Stuart Baanstra	88	0.00	0.00
Independent	Phil Douglas	71	0.00	0.00
Independent	Lindsay Bignell	57	0.00	0.00
Independent	Alan Francis	57	0.00	0.00
Independent	Frank Monte	52	0.00	0.00
Independent	John Tullis	49	0.00	0.00
Progress	Bruce Manefield	44	0.00	+0.00
Total formal votes		4,076,024	94.65	+0.76
Informal votes		230,260	5.35	−0.76
Turnout		4,306,285	92.89	+0.10

== Continuing members ==
The following MLCs were not up for re-election this year.

Member	Party	Term
Sophie Cotsis	Labor	2010–2015
Amanda Fazio	Labor	2007–2015
Luke Foley	Labor	2010–2015
John Hatzistergos	Labor	2011–2015
Shaoquett Moselmane	Labor	2009–2015
Eddie Obeid	Labor	2011–2015
Mick Veitch	Labor	2007–2015
Lynda Voltz	Labor	2007–2015
Helen Westwood	Labor	2007–2015
John Ajaka	Liberal	2007–2015
Marie Ficarra	Liberal	2007–2015
Don Harwin	Liberal	2007–2015
Charlie Lynn	Liberal	2007–2015
Matthew Mason-Cox	Liberal	2007–2015
Jenny Gardiner	National	2007–2015
Trevor Khan	National	2007–2015
Melinda Pavey	National	2007–2015
John Kaye	Greens	2007–2015
Cate Faehrmann	Greens	2010–2015
Fred Nile	Christian Democrats	2007–2015
Robert Borsak	Shooters Party	2010–2015

== See also ==
- Results of the 2011 New South Wales state election (Legislative Assembly)
- Candidates of the 2011 New South Wales state election
- Members of the New South Wales Legislative Council, 2011–2015
