= Living with the Enemy (Australian TV series) =

Australian documentary series

- Genre: Non-Fiction
- Country of origin: Australia
- Original language: English
- No. of seasons: 1
- No. of episodes: 6

Production
- Producer: Tim Toni
- Running time: 60 minutes (including commercials)
- Production company: Shine Australia

Original release
- Network: SBS One
- Release: 3 September – 8 October 2014

Living with the Enemy is a documentary series aired on SBS Australia throughout September and October 2014.

== Episodes ==
Episode 1 : Same-Sex Marriage

Episode 2 : Detention Centres

Episode 3 : Immigration

Episode 4 : Islam

Episode 5 : Marijuana

Episode 6 : Hunting: Steve Lee (hunter) spent a week with Animal Liberation Victoria

== Notes ==
In episode 4, "Counter-Jihadist" Ben lived with devout Muslim couple Lydia and Ahmed, and was supposed to host them in his home. But he stormed out only three days into the 10-day experiment, saying that "moderate Muslims" do not exist.

In episode 6, Robert Borsak of the NSW Shooters, Fishers and Farmers Party was a Guest on the episode.

== DVD release ==
The DVD will be released on 8 October 2014.
