= CountryMinded =

Australian political party

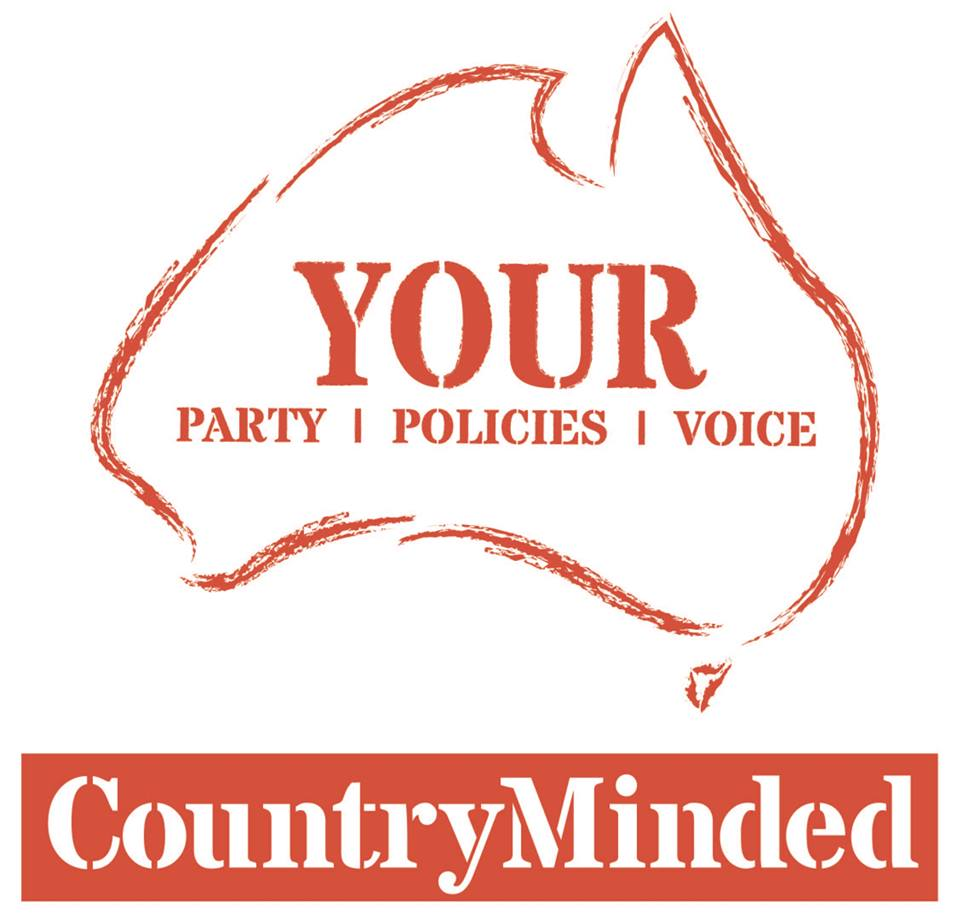
- Chairman: Peter Mailler
- Founder: Peter Mailler (Note: One of several co-founders.)
- Founded: December 2014
- Dissolved: 8 May 2018
- Merged into: Australian Democrats
- Ideology: Agrarianism
- Slogan: Your Party, Policies, Voice
- Wagga Wagga City Council: 1 / 9 (2015)

Website
- http://www.countryminded.org.au/

CountryMinded was an Australian political party formed in 2014 that claimed to represent the interests of regional Australians whose livelihoods depend either directly or indirectly on agricultural production. The party was founded by a group of people looking for accountable regional representation, including two brothers from New South Wales, David and Peter Mailler as the Country Party of Australia, and changed its name to CountryMinded in September 2015. In 2018, the party merged with the Australian Democrats.

== History ==
Peter Mailler stood as lead Australian Senate candidate for Katter's Australian Party in New South Wales at the 2013 Australian election and is also a former chair of Grain Producers Australia.

CountryMinded was formed (as the Country Party of Australia) in response to perceived lack of attention to rural issues in the Australian political process, and dissatisfaction with how the National Party represents regional Australians.

The party was registered in time to contest the 2016 federal election. It announced that it had reached the required 500 members in January 2016, and submitted the application for registration on 3 March 2016. Registration was confirmed on 12 April 2016.

On 2 February 2018, the Australian Electoral Commission issued a notice that it was considering deregistering the party on the grounds that it had ceased to have at least 500 members. On 8 May 2018, CountryMinded was deregistered by the Australian Electoral Commission for that reason.

Soon after the party was deregistered, the organisation merged with the Australian Democrats. The merged entity subsequently registered and unsuccessfully contested a few Senate seats in the 2019 and 2022 federal elections.

== Ideology ==
The party described itself as non-aligned, rural, and independent.

CountryMinded was founded on assertion of the fundamental importance of agriculture as the key sustainable foundation of society.

== 2015 state elections ==
CountryMinded did not contest the 2015 Queensland state election. It endorsed several independent candidates in the 2015 NSW state election as the Country Party of Australia.

In February 2015 the party, though still unregistered, announced Ron Pike, a former National Party member, would run as a Country Party candidate for the New South Wales Legislative Council in the 2015 NSW state election. Three other candidates endorsed by the party stood for the Legislative Assembly, although they were listed as independents on the ballot paper. David Mailler contested the seat of Northern Tablelands, Helen Dalton stood in the seat of Murray, and Paul Funnell, a City of Wagga Wagga councillor, contested the seat of Wagga Wagga. Pike plus 13 others formed a group for the Legislative Council, however a group of 15 is required to have a box for voters to vote "above the line". The candidate descriptions did not claim to represent the Country Party of Australia, but three of the candidates in "Group V" (Ron Pike, Pete Mailler, and Julie Pike) nominated the www.yourcountryparty.info website.

=== Results ===
None of the candidates endorsed by the Country Party were elected. Helen Dalton placed second in Murray with 18.48% of votes to Adrian Piccoli (who had been the member for Murrumbidgee before the redistribution). Piccoli had beaten Dalton for National Party of Australia preselection in May 2014, before Dalton ran as an independent. Paul Funnell was third in Wagga Wagga behind Liberal and Country Labor party candidates. David Mailler was beaten by both the Nationals and Country Labor candidates in Northern Tablelands as well.

== 2016 Federal election ==
CountryMinded fielded two senate candidates and one candidate in the House of Representatives in each of Queensland and New South Wales in the 2016 federal election. David Mailler placed sixth of ten candidates with 1.41% in the Division of New England, and Luke Arbuckle placed seventh of eight candidates with 2.38% in the Division of Maranoa. The senate candidates drew a total of 0.07% of first preferences in New South Wales and 0.10% in Queensland.

Peter Mailler represented the party at the 2017 New England by-election and placed sixth of 17 candidates with 2.4% of the vote.

== See also ==
- List of agrarian parties
- Katter's Australian Party
