= Steve Lee (hunter) =

- Also known as: Steve "I like guns" Lee
- Born: 24 April 1967 (age 59); Ipswich Queensland
- Genre: Country
- Occupations: Contract shooter, pyrotechnic
- Instruments: Guitar, vocals
- Years active: 2009-present
- Website: ilikeguns.com.au

Stephen Gary "Steve" Lee is an Australian country musician and gun rights activist. In 2009 he released his first music video, I Like Guns.

== Pro-gun activities ==
Lee is a pro-gun activist, having supported and spoken with the Shooters and Fishers Party leader Robert Borsak, and put forward many singles and statements regarding guns, gun laws, criminals and law-abiding gun owners. (Note: Steve Lee Interviews Shooters and Fishers Party on YouTube Retrieved 15 June 2014)

Since 2009 he has been invited to the United States by the National Rifle Association of America, had his song "I Like Guns" featured in a video game, appeared in HBO's "Guns in America" and been interviewed nationally on A Current Affair. He has also released a DVD.

Lee was part of a 2014 episode of SBS Television series Living with the Enemy on hunting. Steve spent a week living at the headquarters of Animal Liberation Victoria witnessing a duck hunting protest, then vegan Felicity Andersen spent a week at Steve's home where she joined Lee and Robert Borsak on a feral pig hunt.

=== Politics ===
Steve Lee was a Shooters and Fishers Party candidate for the New South Wales Legislative Council in 2011, and in 2015.

== Music ==
In 2009 Lee released his first music video, I Like Guns, which gained millions of views on his YouTube channel.

=== Discography ===
I Like Guns

Tracks on I Like Guns include:

- I Like Guns (2:37)
- The Shoot Out (3:05)
- Time To Get A Gun (3:01)
- Pistol In My Hand (2:39)
- Devil's Right Hand (2:22)
- Gun Shy Dog (1:54)
- Rock Salt & Nails (4:43)
- I'll Give Up My Gun (4:11)
- Modern Day Bonnie & Clyde (4:25)
- Don't Take Your Guns To Town (4:08)
- 7 Shells (3:00)
- She Don't Like Guns (2:28)

Everybody Likes Guns

Tracklist for Everybody Likes Guns:

- Who Gave You The Right (2:58)
- Pistols And Rifles (3:59)
- Everybody Likes Guns (3:20)
- I’ve Shot Every Gun (2:41)
- I Cannot Shoot A Gun (3:48)
- Gonna Buy Me A Gun (3:01)
- Lucky Country (4:08)
- I Won't Back Down (3:18)
- Huntin’ Fool (3:12)
- Life Is Good (Hickok 45 Song) (3:18)
- A Trigger To Pull (3:32)
- There's A Gun In The Kitchen (3:38)
