= Members of the New South Wales Legislative Assembly, 1959–1962 =

Members of the New South Wales Legislative Assembly who served in the 39th parliament held their seats from 1959 to 1962. They were elected at the 1959 state election, and at by-elections. The Speaker was Ray Maher.

Name	Party	Electorate	Term in office
Keith Anderson (Note: Paddington-Waverley Labor MLA William Ferguson died on 29 January 1961. Labor candidate Keith Anderson won the resulting by-election on 25 February.)	Labor	Paddington-Waverley	1961–1962
Robert Askin	Liberal	Collaroy	1950–1975
Brian Bannon	Labor	Rockdale	1959–1986
Jack Beale	Liberal	South Coast	1942–1973
Ivan Black	Liberal	Neutral Bay	1945–1951, 1951–1962
George Booth (Note: Kurri Kurri Labor MLA George Booth died on 31 July 1960. His son, Labor candidate Ken Booth, won the resulting by-election on 8 October.)	Labor	Kurri Kurri	1925–1960
Ken Booth	Labor	Kurri Kurri	1960–1988
George Brain	Liberal	Willoughby	1943–1968
Jim Brown	Country	Raleigh	1959–1984
Michael Bruxner	Country	Tenterfield	1920–1962
Joseph Cahill (Note: Cook’s River Labor MLA and Premier Joseph Cahill died on 22 October 1959. His son, Labor candidate Tom Cahill, won the resulting by-election on 12 December.)	Labor	Cook's River	1925–1959
Tom Cahill	Labor	Cook's River	1959–1983
Bill Chaffey	Country	Tamworth	1940–1973
Bill Chapman	Liberal	Nepean	1956–1962
Reg Coady	Labor	Leichhardt	1954–1973
Keith Compton (Note: The 1959 re-election of Lismore Country Party MLA Jack Easter was overturned by the Court of Disputed Returns on 12 June 1959. Labor candidate Keith Compton won the resulting by-election on 12 September.)	Labor	Lismore	1959–1965
Rex Connor	Labor	Wollongong-Kembla	1950–1963
Geoffrey Cox	Liberal	Vaucluse	1957–1964
Bill Crabtree	Labor	Kogarah	1953–1983
Geoff Crawford	Country	Barwon	1950–1976
Douglas Cross	Liberal	Georges River	1948–1953, 1956–1970
Charles Cutler	Country	Orange	1947–1975
Tom Dalton	Labor	Sutherland	1953–1956, 1959–1968
Douglas Darby	Liberal	Manly	1945–1978
Bernie Deane	Liberal	Hawkesbury	1950–1972
Alfred Dennis (Note: Blacktown MLA Alfred Dennis was elected as a representative of the Liberal Party, but resigned to sit as an independent in 1962 after losing a preselection challenge for the safer Liberal seat of The Hills.)	Liberal/Independent	Blacktown	1959–1962
Doug Dickson (Note: Temora Country Party MLA Doug Dickson died on 27 July 1960. Country Party candidate Jim Taylor won the resulting by-election on 8 October.)	Country	Temora	1938–1960
Ben Doig	Liberal	Burwood	1957–1965
Frank Downing	Labor	Ryde	1953–1968
Clarrie Earl	Labor	Fairfield	1953–1973
Jack Easter	Country	Lismore	1953–1959
Kevin Ellis	Liberal	Coogee	1948–1953, 1956–1962, 1965–1973
George Enticknap	Labor	Murrumbidgee	1941–1965
Jack Ferguson	Labor	Merrylands	1959–1984
William Ferguson	Labor	Paddington-Waverley	1953–1961
Wal Fife	Liberal	Wagga Wagga	1957–1975
Ray Fitzgerald	Country	Gloucester	1941–1962
Les Ford	Liberal	Dubbo	1959–1964
Howard Fowles	Labor	Illawarra	1941–1968
Stewart Fraser	Liberal	Gordon	1953–1962
George Freudenstein	Country	Young	1959–1981
William Gollan	Labor	Randwick	1941–1962
Fred Green	Labor	Redfern	1950–1968
Ian Griffith	Liberal	Cronulla	1956–1978
Frank Hawkins	Labor	Newcastle	1935–1968
Eric Hearnshaw	Liberal	Eastwood	1945–1965
Bob Heffron	Labor	Maroubra	1930–1968
Pat Hills	Labor	Phillip	1954–1988
Davis Hughes	Country	Armidale	1950–1953, 1956–1973
David Hunter	Liberal	Ashfield-Croydon	1940–1976
Harold Jackson	Liberal	Gosford	1950–1965
Rex Jackson	Labor	Bulli	1955–1986
Les Jordan (Note: Oxley MLA Les Jordan had been re-elected as a Country Party member in 1959, but defected to the Liberal Party late that year.)	Country/Liberal	Oxley	1944–1965
Gus Kelly	Labor	Bathurst	1925–1932, 1935–1967
Joe Kelly	Labor	East Hills	1956–1973
Bill Lamb	Labor	Granville	1938–1962
Abe Landa	Labor	Bondi	1930–1965
Walter Lawrence	Liberal	Drummoyne	1956–1962
Joe Lawson	Country	Murray	1932–1973
Tom Lewis	Liberal	Wollondilly	1957–1978
Ray Maher	Labor	North Sydney	1953–1965
Dan Mahoney	Labor	Parramatta	1959–1976
Cliff Mallam	Labor	Dulwich Hill	1953–1968, 1971–1981
Jack Mannix	Labor	Liverpool	1952–1971
Robert McCartney	Labor	Hamilton	1959–1971
Ken McCaw	Liberal	Lane Cove	1947–1975
John McMahon	Labor	Balmain	1950–1968
Milton Morris	Liberal	Maitland	1956–1980
Pat Morton	Liberal	Mosman	1947–1972
Thomas Murphy	Labor	Concord	1953–1968
George Neilly	Labor	Cessnock	1959–1978
Leo Nott	Labor	Mudgee	1953–1973
Roger Nott (Note: Liverpool Plains Labor MLA Roger Nott resigned on 3 March 1961 to accept an appointment as Administrator of the Northern Territory. Country Party candidate Frank O'Keefe won the resulting by-election on 25 March.)	Labor	Liverpool Plains	1941–1961
Frank O'Keefe	Country	Liverpool Plains	1961–1969
Doug Padman	Liberal	Albury	1947–1965
Spence Powell	Labor	Bankstown	1950–1962
Leon Punch	Country	Upper Hunter	1959–1985
Frank Purdue	Independent	Waratah	1956–1962, 1964–1965
Jack Renshaw	Labor	Castlereagh	1941–1980
Bill Rigby	Labor	Hurstville	1959–1965
Ian Robinson	Country	Casino	1953–1963
Jim Robson	Labor	Hartley	1956–1965
Norm Ryan	Labor	Marrickville	1953–1973
Thomas Ryan	Labor	Auburn	1956–1965
John Seiffert	Labor	Monaro	1941–1965
Bill Sheahan	Labor	Burrinjuck	1941–1973
Jim Simpson	Labor	Lake Macquarie	1950–1968
Albert Sloss	Labor	King	1956–1973
Stanley Stephens	Country	Byron	1944–1973
Jack Stewart	Labor	Kahibah	1957–1972
Sydney Storey	Liberal	Hornsby	1941–1962
Jim Taylor	Country	Temora	1960–1981
Arthur Tonge	Labor	Canterbury	1926–1932, 1935–1962
Vernon Treatt	Liberal	Woollahra	1938–1962
Laurie Tully	Labor	Goulburn	1946–1965
William Wattison	Labor	Sturt	1947–1968
Bill Weiley	Country	Clarence	1955–1971
Ernest Wetherell	Labor	Cobar	1949–1965
Eric Willis	Liberal	Earlwood	1950–1978
Stan Wyatt	Labor	Lakemba	1950–1964

== See also ==
- Fourth Cahill ministry
- First Heffron ministry
- Results of the 1959 New South Wales state election
- Candidates of the 1959 New South Wales state election
