= Results of the 1959 New South Wales state election =

State election for New South Wales, Australia in March 1959

New South Wales state election, 21 March 1959 Legislative Assembly << 1956–1962 >>
Enrolled voters	2,075,268 (Note: There were 1,850,675 enrolled voters in 83 contested electorates and 224,593 were enrolled in 11 uncontested electorates (1 Labor, 5 Liberal and 5 Country ).)				
Votes cast	1,739,580		Turnout	94.00	+0.73
Informal votes	31,864		Informal	1.83	+0.16
Summary of votes by party
Party	Primary votes	%	Swing	Seats	Change
Labor	838,836	49.12	+1.87	49	−1
Liberal	603,718	35.35	−0.74	28	+1
Country	148,738	8.71	−1.45	16	+1
Independent	61,939	3.63	+0.50	1	−
Communist	24,784	1.45	−0.29	0	−
Democratic Labor	22,508	1.32	+1.32	0	−
Independent Labor	7,193	0.42	−1.46	0	−1
Total	1,707,716			94	

This is a list of electoral district results for the 1959 New South Wales state election.

== Results by electoral district ==
=== Albury ===
1959 New South Wales state election: Albury
Party	Candidate	Votes	%	±%
Liberal	Doug Padman	11,672	58.2	
Labor	Reginald Garland	6,368	31.8	
Democratic Labor	Lawrence Esler	1,988	10.0	
Total formal votes		20,038	98.9	
Informal votes		232	1.1	
Turnout		20,270	92.7	
Two-party-preferred result
Liberal	Doug Padman	12,871	64.2	
Labor	Reginald Garland	7,167	35.8	
Liberal hold		Swing		

=== Armidale ===
1959 New South Wales state election: Armidale
Party	Candidate	Votes	%	±%
Country	Davis Hughes	9,956	56.3	
Labor	Percy Love	7,170	40.5	
Democratic Labor	Richard Stanley	568	3.2	
Total formal votes		17,694	98.6	
Informal votes		242	1.4	
Turnout		17,936	94.2	
Two-party-preferred result
Country	Davis Hughes	10,410	58.8	
Labor	Percy Love	7,284	41.2	
Country hold		Swing		

=== Ashfield−Croydon ===
1959 New South Wales state election: Ashfield−Croydon
Party	Candidate	Votes	%	±%
Liberal	David Hunter	8,207	37.4	
Labor	John McCartney	7,838	35.7	
Liberal	Richard Murden (defeated)	5,920	26.9	
Total formal votes		21,965	98.7	
Informal votes		284	1.3	
Turnout		22,249	93.6	
Two-party-preferred result
Liberal	David Hunter	13,607	61.9	
Labor	John McCartney	8,358	38.1	
Liberal notional hold				

Ashfield, held by Richard Murden (Liberal) and Croydon, held by David Hunter (Liberal) were combined into one seat.

=== Auburn ===
1959 New South Wales state election: Auburn
Party	Candidate	Votes	%	±%
Labor	Thomas Ryan	15,321	64.6	
Liberal	John Steel	8,396	35.4	
Total formal votes		23,717	98.1	
Informal votes		460	1.9	
Turnout		24,177	94.9	
Labor hold		Swing		

=== Balmain ===
1959 New South Wales state election: Balmain
Party	Candidate	Votes	%	±%
Labor	John McMahon	15,216	70.4	
Liberal	Sabina Greenman	5,067	23.4	
Communist	Stanley Moran	1,328	6.2	
Total formal votes		21,611	97.7	
Informal votes		511	2.3	
Turnout		22,122	93.1	
Two-party-preferred result
Labor	John McMahon	16,278	75.3	
Liberal	Sabina Greenman	5,333	24.7	
Labor hold		Swing		

=== Bankstown ===
1959 New South Wales state election: Bankstown
Party	Candidate	Votes	%	±%
Labor	Spence Powell	12,519	59.3	
Liberal	Fred Howe	7,066	33.5	
Independent	Charles Reid	842	4.0	
Communist	Jack Hughes	670	3.2	
Total formal votes		21,097	97.9	
Informal votes		448	2.1	
Turnout		21,545	94.7	
Two-party-preferred result
Labor	Spence Powell	13,476	63.9	
Liberal	Fred Howe	7,621	36.1	
Labor hold		Swing		

=== Barwon ===
1959 New South Wales state election: Barwon
Party	Candidate	Votes	%	±%
Country	Geoff Crawford	9,789	60.7	
Labor	Thomas Burt	6,338	39.3	
Total formal votes		16,127	99.0	
Informal votes		168	1.0	
Turnout		16,295	92.3	
Country hold		Swing		

=== Bathurst ===
1959 New South Wales state election: Bathurst
Party	Candidate	Votes	%	±%
Labor	Gus Kelly	9,789	59.4	
Liberal	Campbell Alexander	6,686	40.6	
Total formal votes		16,475	99.1	
Informal votes		143	0.9	
Turnout		16,618	95.7	
Labor hold		Swing		

=== Blacktown ===
1959 New South Wales state election: Blacktown
Party	Candidate	Votes	%	±%
Liberal	Alfred Dennis	13,519	49.9	
Labor	Jim Southee	12,044	44.5	
Democratic Labor	Francis Moffitt	834	3.1	
Independent	Frank Finlayson	691	2.6	
Total formal votes		27,088	97.7	
Informal votes		625	2.3	
Turnout		27,713	93.5	
Two-party-preferred result
Liberal	Alfred Dennis	14,650	54.1	
Labor	Jim Southee	12,438	45.9	
Liberal gain from Labor		Swing		

=== Bondi ===
1959 New South Wales state election: Bondi
Party	Candidate	Votes	%	±%
Labor	Abe Landa	10,713	50.4	
Liberal	Carl Jeppesen	9,660	45.4	
Democratic Labor	Charles Massey	881	4.2	
Total formal votes		21,254	98.0	
Informal votes		429	2.0	
Turnout		21,683	93.3	
Two-party-preferred result
Labor	Abe Landa	10,889	51.2	
Liberal	Carl Jeppesen	10,365	48.8	
Labor hold		Swing		

=== Bulli ===
1959 New South Wales state election: Bulli
Party	Candidate	Votes	%	±%
Labor	Rex Jackson	13,168	65.7	
Liberal	Donald Heggie	5,897	29.4	
Communist	Frederick Watson	965	4.8	
Total formal votes		20,030	98.3	
Informal votes		355	1.7	
Turnout		20,385	94.3	
Two-party-preferred result
Labor	Rex Jackson	13,940	69.6	
Liberal	Donald Heggie	6,090	30.4	
Labor hold		Swing		

=== Burrinjuck ===
1959 New South Wales state election: Burrinjuck
Party	Candidate	Votes	%	±%
Labor	Bill Sheahan	10,097	55.6	
Country	Allan Johnson	8,078	44.4	
Total formal votes		18,175	99.3	
Informal votes		131	0.7	
Turnout		18,306	95.3	
Labor hold		Swing		

=== Burwood ===
1959 New South Wales state election: Burwood
Party	Candidate	Votes	%	±%
Liberal	Ben Doig	13,413	61.6	
Labor	John Cunningham	8,375	38.4	
Total formal votes		21,788	97.6	
Informal votes		525	2.4	
Turnout		22,313	92.2	
Liberal hold		Swing		

=== Byron ===
1959 New South Wales state election: Byron
Party	Candidate	Votes	%	±%
Country	Stanley Stephens	unopposed		
Country hold				

=== Canterbury ===
1959 New South Wales state election: Canterbury
Party	Candidate	Votes	%	±%
Labor	Arthur Tonge	13,353	58.6	
Liberal	William Dowd	9,417	41.4	
Total formal votes		22,770	98.6	
Informal votes		321	1.4	
Turnout		23,091	94.5	
Labor hold		Swing		

=== Casino ===
1959 New South Wales state election: Casino
Party	Candidate	Votes	%	±%
Country	Ian Robinson	unopposed		
Country hold				

=== Castlereagh ===
1959 New South Wales state election: Castlereagh
Party	Candidate	Votes	%	±%
Labor	Jack Renshaw	9,344	52.8	
Country	Calverley Brown	8,346	47.2	
Total formal votes		17,690	99.0	
Informal votes		172	1.0	
Turnout		17,862	91.9	
Labor hold		Swing		

=== Cessnock ===
1959 New South Wales state election: Cessnock
Party	Candidate	Votes	%	±%
Labor	George Neilly	12,740	62.4	
Independent	Charles Haxton	5,972	29.2	
Communist	David Stevenson	1,710	8.4	
Total formal votes		20,422	98.3	
Informal votes		350	1.7	
Turnout		20,772	95.3	
Two-candidate-preferred result
Labor	George Neilly	13,595	66.6	
Independent	Charles Haxton	6,827	33.4	
Labor hold		Swing		

=== Clarence ===
1959 New South Wales state election: Clarence
Party	Candidate	Votes	%	±%
Country	Bill Weiley	unopposed		
Country hold				

=== Cobar ===
1959 New South Wales state election: Cobar
Party	Candidate	Votes	%	±%
Labor	Ernest Wetherell	unopposed		
Labor hold				

=== Collaroy ===
1959 New South Wales state election: Collaroy
Party	Candidate	Votes	%	±%
Liberal	Robert Askin	17,868	71.1	
Labor	Erwin Eder	7,266	28.9	
Total formal votes		25,134	98.4	
Informal votes		402	1.6	
Turnout		25,536	93.4	
Liberal hold		Swing		

=== Concord ===
1959 New South Wales state election: Concord
Party	Candidate	Votes	%	±%
Labor	Thomas Murphy	11,165	49.1	
Liberal	Lerryn Mutton	10,333	45.4	
Democratic Labor	Jack Kane	1,258	5.5	
Total formal votes		22,756	98.3	
Informal votes		400	1.7	
Turnout		23,156	94.6	
Two-party-preferred result
Labor	Thomas Murphy	11,753	51.7	
Liberal	Lerryn Mutton	11,003	48.3	
Labor hold		Swing		

=== Coogee ===
1959 New South Wales state election: Coogee
Party	Candidate	Votes	%	±%
Liberal	Kevin Ellis	10,309	49.3	
Labor	Lou Walsh	9,690	46.3	
Democratic Labor	Allan Carter	930	4.4	
Total formal votes		20,929	98.3	
Informal votes		364	1.7	
Turnout		21,293	92.9	
Two-party-preferred result
Liberal	Kevin Ellis	11,027	52.7	
Labor	Lou Walsh	9,902	47.3	
Liberal hold		Swing		

=== Cook's River ===
1959 New South Wales state election: Cook's River
Party	Candidate	Votes	%	±%
Labor	Joseph Cahill	16,111	70.9	
Liberal	Athol McCoy	5,507	24.2	
Independent	Charles Higbid	1,094	4.8	
Total formal votes		22,712	98.3	
Informal votes		392	1.7	
Turnout		23,104	95.3	
Two-party-preferred result
Labor	Joseph Cahill	16,931	74.5	
Liberal	Athol McCoy	5,781	25.5	
Labor hold		Swing		

=== Cronulla ===
1959 New South Wales state election: Cronulla
Party	Candidate	Votes	%	±%
Liberal	Ian Griffith	13,085	60.6	
Labor	Gordon Neilson	8,498	39.4	
Total formal votes		21,583	98.9	
Informal votes		249	1.1	
Turnout		21,832	95.5	
Liberal notional hold				

Ian Griffith (Liberal) was the member for Sutherland.

=== Drummoyne ===
1959 New South Wales state election: Drummoyne
Party	Candidate	Votes	%	±%
Liberal	Walter Lawrence	12,170	52.2	
Labor	Roy Jackson	11,147	47.8	
Total formal votes		23,317	98.4	
Informal votes		373	1.6	
Turnout		23,690	94.6	
Liberal hold		Swing		

=== Dubbo ===
1959 New South Wales state election: Dubbo
Party	Candidate	Votes	%	±%
Labor	Clarrie Robertson	7,216	39.6	
Liberal	Les Ford	5,280	29.0	
Country	Roderick Mack	5,105	28.0	
Democratic Labor	Brian Adams	610	3.4	
Total formal votes		18,211	98.7	
Informal votes		241	1.3	
Turnout		18,452	95.2	
Two-party-preferred result
Liberal	Les Ford	10,398	57.1	
Labor	Clarrie Robertson (defeated)	7,813	42.9	
Liberal gain from Labor		Swing		

=== Dulwich Hill ===
1959 New South Wales state election: Dulwich Hill
Party	Candidate	Votes	%	±%
Labor	Cliff Mallam	11,733	52.3	
Liberal	Joseph Hollis	9,601	42.8	
Democratic Labor	Owen Cahill	1,104	4.9	
Total formal votes		22,438	98.4	
Informal votes		372	1.6	
Turnout		22,810	93.8	
Two-party-preferred result
Labor	Cliff Mallam	11,954	53.3	
Liberal	Joseph Hollis	10,484	46.7	
Labor hold		Swing		

=== Earlwood ===
1959 New South Wales state election: Earlwood
Party	Candidate	Votes	%	±%
Liberal	Eric Willis	13,377	58.4	
Labor	John Buckeridge	9,518	41.6	
Total formal votes		22,895	98.8	
Informal votes		274	1.2	
Turnout		23,169	95.7	
Liberal hold		Swing		

=== East Hills ===
1959 New South Wales state election: East Hills
Party	Candidate	Votes	%	±%
Labor	Joe Kelly	16,578	64.7	
Liberal	Allan Young	6,768	26.4	
Independent	John Bennett	2,269	8.9	
Total formal votes		25,615	98.1	
Informal votes		498	1.9	
Turnout		26,113	95.5	
Two-party-preferred result
Labor	Joe Kelly	17,259	67.4	
Liberal	Allan Young	8,356	32.6	
Labor hold		Swing		

=== Eastwood ===
1959 New South Wales state election: Eastwood
Party	Candidate	Votes	%	±%
Liberal	Eric Hearnshaw	17,702	72.7	
Labor	William Browne	6,649	27.3	
Total formal votes		24,351	98.8	
Informal votes		298	1.2	
Turnout		24,649	93.6	
Liberal hold		Swing		

=== Fairfield ===
1959 New South Wales state election: Fairfield
Party	Candidate	Votes	%	±%
Labor	Clarrie Earl	16,877	66.4	
Liberal	David Fairs	7,733	30.4	
Communist	Edwin Lipscombe	800	3.2	
Total formal votes		25,410	97.5	
Informal votes		657	97.5	
Turnout		26,067	94.6	
Two-party-preferred result
Labor	Clarrie Earl	17,517	68.9	
Liberal	David Fairs	7,893	31.1	
Labor hold		Swing		

=== Georges River ===
1959 New South Wales state election: Georges River
Party	Candidate	Votes	%	±%
Liberal	Douglas Cross	12,919	52.3	
Labor	Albert Kealman	10,989	44.5	
Democratic Labor	Kevin Davis	470	1.9	
Independent	Fitzgerald Mulholland	336	1.4	
Total formal votes		24,714	98.5	
Informal votes		382	1.5	
Turnout		25,096	95.4	
Two-party-preferred result
Liberal	Douglas Cross	13,463	54.5	
Labor	Albert Kealman	11,251	45.5	
Liberal hold		Swing		

=== Gloucester ===
1959 New South Wales state election: Gloucester
Party	Candidate	Votes	%	±%
Country	Ray Fitzgerald	9,490	57.2	
Independent	Alan Borthwick	7,109	42.8	
Total formal votes		16,599	98.1	
Informal votes		325	1.9	
Turnout		16,924	94.5	
Country hold		Swing		

=== Gordon ===
1959 New South Wales state election: Gordon
Party	Candidate	Votes	%	±%
Liberal	Stewart Fraser	unopposed		
Liberal hold				

=== Gosford ===
1959 New South Wales state election: Gosford
Party	Candidate	Votes	%	±%
Liberal	Harold Jackson	11,999	60.8	
Labor	Reginald Smith	7,746	39.2	
Total formal votes		19,745	98.7	
Informal votes		268	1.3	
Turnout		20,013	93.9	
Liberal hold		Swing		

=== Goulburn ===
1959 New South Wales state election: Goulburn
Party	Candidate	Votes	%	±%
Labor	Laurie Tully	8,135	49.9	
Liberal	Ray Bladwell	7,105	43.5	
Democratic Labor	Charles O'Brien	1,073	6.6	
Total formal votes		16,313	99.1	
Informal votes		142	0.9	
Turnout		16,455	95.6	
Two-party-preferred result
Labor	Laurie Tully	8,468	51.9	
Liberal	Ray Bladwell	7,845	48.1	
Labor hold		Swing		

=== Granville ===
1959 New South Wales state election: Granville
Party	Candidate	Votes	%	±%
Labor	Bill Lamb	15,273	67.9	
Liberal	Robert Leech	6,080	27.0	
Communist	Harold Ewer	1,137	5.1	
Total formal votes		22,490	97.9	
Informal votes		473	2.1	
Turnout		22,963	93.7	
Two-party-preferred result
Labor	Bill Lamb	16,183	72.0	
Liberal	Robert Leech	6,307	28.0	
Labor hold		Swing		

=== Hamilton ===
1959 New South Wales state election: Hamilton
Party	Candidate	Votes	%	±%
Labor	Robert McCartney	9,937	55.5	
Liberal	Brian O'Loughlin	6,024	33.7	
Democratic Labor	John Daley	1,937	10.8	
Total formal votes		17,898	98.1	
Informal votes		339	1.9	
Turnout		18,237	94.8	
Two-party-preferred result
Labor	Robert McCartney	10,324	57.7	
Liberal	Brian O'Loughlin	7,574	42.3	
Labor hold		Swing		

=== Hartley ===
1959 New South Wales state election: Hartley
Party	Candidate	Votes	%	±%
Labor	Jim Robson	13,963	87.9	
Communist	Peter Carroll	1,931	12.1	
Total formal votes		15,894	92.0	
Informal votes		1,378	8.0	
Turnout		17,272	94.9	
Labor hold		Swing		

=== Hawkesbury ===
1959 New South Wales state election: Hawkesbury
Party	Candidate	Votes	%	±%
Liberal	Bernie Deane	11,371	57.7	
Labor	Kevin Dwyer	8,338	42.3	
Total formal votes		19,709	98.8	
Informal votes		240	1.2	
Turnout		19,949	93.2	
Liberal hold		Swing		

=== Hornsby ===
1959 New South Wales state election: Hornsby
Party	Candidate	Votes	%	±%
Liberal	Sydney Storey	16,234	66.7	
Labor	Arthur Evans	8,087	33.3	
Total formal votes		24,321	98.2	
Informal votes		447	1.8	
Turnout		24,768	92.4	
Liberal hold		Swing		

=== Hurstville ===
1959 New South Wales state election: Hurstville
Party	Candidate	Votes	%	±%
Liberal	Hedley Mallard	9,359	38.0	
Labor	Bill Rigby	7,680	31.2	
Independent	Clive Evatt (defeated)	7,193	29.2	
Independent	Edward Merryfull	378	1.5	
Total formal votes		24,610	98.5	
Informal votes		378	1.5	
Turnout		24,988	95.1	
Two-party-preferred result
Labor	Bill Rigby	13,244	53.8	
Liberal	Hedley Mallard	11,366	46.2	
Labor hold		Swing		

The sitting member was Clive Evatt was expelled from Labor on 13 July 1956 and sat as an Independent.

=== Illawarra ===
1959 New South Wales state election: Illawarra
Party	Candidate	Votes	%	±%
Labor	Howard Fowles	14,503	69.0	
Independent	James Casey	4,463	21.2	
Communist	David Bowen	2,056	9.8	
Total formal votes		21,022	96.5	
Informal votes		765	3.5	
Turnout		21,787	93.1	
Two-candidate-preferred result
Labor	Howard Fowles	15,531	73.9	
Independent	James Casey	5,491	26.1	
Labor hold		Swing		

=== Kahibah ===
1959 New South Wales state election: Kahibah
Party	Candidate	Votes	%	±%
Labor	Jack Stewart	11,908	63.7	
Liberal	Eric Cupit	6,790	36.3	
Total formal votes		18,698	98.4	
Informal votes		311	1.6	
Turnout		19,009	95.5	
Labor gain from Independent Labor		Swing		

Tom Armstrong (Independent Labor) died and Jack Stewart (Labor) won the resulting by-election.

=== King ===
1959 New South Wales state election: King
Party	Candidate	Votes	%	±%
Labor	Albert Sloss	13,105	65.1	
Liberal	Adrian Cook	5,539	27.5	
Communist	Ron Maxwell	1,482	7.4	
Total formal votes		20,126	97.0	
Informal votes		629	3.0	
Turnout		20,755	90.0	
Two-party-preferred result
Labor	Albert Sloss	14,291	71.0	
Liberal	Adrian Cook	5,835	29.0	
Labor hold		Swing		

=== Kogarah ===
1959 New South Wales state election: Kogarah
Party	Candidate	Votes	%	±%
Labor	Bill Crabtree	12,079	53.3	
Liberal	Jeffrey Skehan	9,816	43.3	
Democratic Labor	Thomas Brosnan	404	1.8	
Communist	Leslie McPhillips	357	1.6	
Total formal votes		22,656	98.6	
Informal votes		329	1.4	
Turnout		22,985	94.5	
Two-party-preferred result
Labor	Bill Crabtree	12,446	54.9	
Liberal	Jeffrey Skehan	10,210	45.1	
Labor hold		Swing		

=== Kurri Kurri ===
1959 New South Wales state election: Kurri Kurri
Party	Candidate	Votes	%	±%
Labor	George Booth	18,147	89.9	
Communist	Charles Dumbrell	2,042	10.1	
Total formal votes		20,189	96.8	
Informal votes		675	3.2	
Turnout		20,864	95.3	
Labor hold		Swing		

=== Lake Macquarie ===
1959 New South Wales state election: Lake Macquarie
Party	Candidate	Votes	%	±%
Labor	Jim Simpson	15,303	88.7	
Communist	John Tapp	1,942	11.3	
Total formal votes		17,245	95.4	
Informal votes		836	4.6	
Turnout		18,081	94.8	
Labor hold		Swing		

=== Lakemba ===
1959 New South Wales state election: Lakemba
Party	Candidate	Votes	%	±%
Labor	Stan Wyatt	15,510	64.0	
Liberal	Dora Skelsey	8,737	36.0	
Total formal votes		24,247	98.2	
Informal votes		448	1.8	
Turnout		24,695	95.2	
Labor hold		Swing		

=== Lane Cove ===
1959 New South Wales state election: Lane Cove
Party	Candidate	Votes	%	±%
Liberal	Ken McCaw	16,842	69.6	
Labor	Arthur Braddock	6,556	27.1	
Democratic Labor	Mary Gray	816	3.4	
Total formal votes		24,214	98.5	
Informal votes		360	1.5	
Turnout		24,574	93.4	
Two-party-preferred result
Liberal	Ken McCaw	17,495	72.3	
Labor	Arthur Braddock	6,719	27.7	
Liberal hold		Swing		

=== Leichhardt ===
1959 New South Wales state election: Leichhardt
Party	Candidate	Votes	%	±%
Labor	Reg Coady	12,726	61.6	
Liberal	Barney Morton	7,948	38.4	
Total formal votes		20,674	98.3	
Informal votes		358	1.7	
Turnout		21,032	92.4	
Labor hold		Swing		

=== Lismore ===
1959 New South Wales state election: Lismore
Party	Candidate	Votes	%	±%
Country	Jack Easter	7,996	50.01	
Independent	Clyde Campbell	7,994	49.99	
Total formal votes		15,990	98.3	
Informal votes		273	1.7	
Turnout		16,263	93.1	
Country hold		Swing		

=== Liverpool ===
1959 New South Wales state election: Liverpool
Party	Candidate	Votes	%	±%
Labor	Jack Mannix	14,622	58.9	
Liberal	Ron Dunbier	10,200	41.1	
Total formal votes		24,822	97.5	
Informal votes		627	2.5	
Turnout		25,449	93.7	
Labor hold		Swing		

=== Liverpool Plains ===
1959 New South Wales state election: Liverpool Plains
Party	Candidate	Votes	%	±%
Labor	Roger Nott	8,694	51.7	
Country	Frank O'Keefe	7,933	47.2	
Independent	John Pender	195	1.2	
Total formal votes		16,822	98.9	
Informal votes		180	1.1	
Turnout		17,002	94.7	
Two-party-preferred result
Labor	Roger Nott	8,792	52.3	
Country	Frank O'Keefe	8,030	47.7	
Labor hold		Swing		

=== Maitland ===
1959 New South Wales state election: Maitland
Party	Candidate	Votes	%	±%
Liberal	Milton Morris	8,552	52.2	
Labor	William Harvey	6,681	40.8	
Democratic Labor	Douglas Drinkwater	1,011	6.2	
Independent	Henry Ivins	138	0.8	
Total formal votes		16,382	98.7	
Informal votes		212	1.3	
Turnout		16,594	96.0	
Two-party-preferred result
Liberal	Milton Morris	9,430	57.6	
Labor	William Harvey	6,952	42.4	
Liberal hold		Swing		

=== Manly ===
1959 New South Wales state election: Manly
Party	Candidate	Votes	%	±%
Liberal	Douglas Darby	15,078	63.1	
Labor	Geoffrey Mill	8,803	36.9	
Total formal votes		23,881	98.4	
Informal votes		395	1.6	
Turnout		24,276	92.8	
Liberal hold		Swing		

=== Maroubra ===
1959 New South Wales state election: Maroubra
Party	Candidate	Votes	%	±%
Labor	Bob Heffron	13,063	61.3	
Liberal	George Anthony	7,517	35.3	
Communist	Jim Baird	731	3.4	
Total formal votes		21,311	98.4	
Informal votes		343	1.6	
Turnout		21,654	95.5	
Two-party-preferred result
Labor	Bob Heffron	13,648	64.0	
Liberal	George Anthony	7,663	36.0	
Labor hold		Swing		

=== Marrickville ===
1959 New South Wales state election: Marrickville
Party	Candidate	Votes	%	±%
Labor	Norm Ryan	14,546	69.0	
Liberal	Michael Lazar	6,542	31.0	
Total formal votes		21,088	97.7	
Informal votes		501	2.3	
Turnout		21,589	93.9	
Labor hold		Swing		

=== Merrylands ===
1959 New South Wales state election: Merrylands
Party	Candidate	Votes	%	±%
Labor	Jack Ferguson	14,785	56.0	
Liberal	Graham Cullis	11,636	44.0	
Total formal votes		26,421	98.0	
Informal votes		546	2.0	
Turnout		26,967	94.7	
Labor notional hold				

=== Monaro ===
1959 New South Wales state election: Monaro
Party	Candidate	Votes	%	±%
Labor	John Seiffert	8,890	57.6	
Liberal	Mark Flanagan	6,540	42.4	
Total formal votes		15,430	98.5	
Informal votes		242	1.5	
Turnout		15,672	93.2	
Labor hold		Swing		

=== Mosman ===
1959 New South Wales state election: Mosman
Party	Candidate	Votes	%	±%
Liberal	Pat Morton	20,595	90.2	
Communist	Bill Wood	2,247	9.8	
Total formal votes		22,842	95.6	
Informal votes		1,062	4.4	
Turnout		23,904	92.7	
Liberal hold		Swing		

=== Mudgee ===
1959 New South Wales state election: Mudgee
Party	Candidate	Votes	%	±%
Labor	Leo Nott	7,929	49.3	
Liberal	Jack Ives	4,221	26.3	
Country	Norman Griffith	3,576	22.2	
Democratic Labor	Donald Bennett	347	2.2	
Total formal votes		16,073	98.8	
Informal votes		198	1.2	
Turnout		16,271	95.4	
Two-party-preferred result
Labor	Leo Nott	8,174	50.9	
Liberal	Jack Ives	7,899	49.1	
Labor hold		Swing		

=== Murray ===
1959 New South Wales state election: Murray
Party	Candidate	Votes	%	±%
Country	Joe Lawson	11,555	64.6	
Labor	John Hayes	6,334	35.4	
Total formal votes		17,889	99.1	
Informal votes		154	0.9	
Turnout		18,043	90.7	
Country hold		Swing		

=== Murrumbidgee ===
1959 New South Wales state election: Murrumbidgee
Party	Candidate	Votes	%	±%
Labor	George Enticknap	8,611	47.6	
Country	Verdon Letheren	5,903	32.6	
Independent	Sidney Braithwaite	2,774	15.3	
Democratic Labor	Francis O'Connell	798	4.4	
Total formal votes		18,086	98.0	
Informal votes		363	2.0	
Turnout		18,449	92.4	
Two-party-preferred result
Labor	George Enticknap	10,216	56.5	
Country	Verdon Letheren	7,870	43.5	
Labor hold		Swing		

=== Nepean ===
1959 New South Wales state election: Nepean
Party	Candidate	Votes	%	±%
Liberal	Bill Chapman	12,284	60.3	
Labor	John Carvan	7,279	35.7	
Communist	Melville McCalman	817	4.0	
Total formal votes		20,380	98.4	
Informal votes		327	1.6	
Turnout		20,707	94.0	
Two-party-preferred result
Liberal	Bill Chapman	12,447	61.1	
Labor	John Carvan	7,933	38.9	
Liberal hold		Swing		

=== Neutral Bay ===
1959 New South Wales state election: Neutral Bay
Party	Candidate	Votes	%	±%
Liberal	Ivan Black	unopposed		
Liberal hold				

=== Newcastle ===
1959 New South Wales state election: Newcastle
Party	Candidate	Votes	%	±%
Labor	Frank Hawkins	12,239	64.5	
Liberal	William Hutchinson	5,950	31.4	
Communist	Mervyn Copley	777	4.1	
Total formal votes		18,966	98.5	
Informal votes		286	1.5	
Turnout		19,252	93.9	
Two-party-preferred result
Labor	Frank Hawkins	12,861	67.8	
Liberal	William Hutchinson	6,105	32.2	
Labor hold		Swing		

=== North Sydney ===
1959 New South Wales state election: North Sydney
Party	Candidate	Votes	%	±%
Labor	Ray Maher	10,694	49.8	
Liberal	Russell Newton	9,513	44.3	
Democratic Labor	Michael Fitzpatrick	899	4.2	
Independent	Francis Ferry	377	1.7	
Total formal votes		21,483	97.6	
Informal votes		526	2.4	
Turnout		22,009	93.1	
Two-party-preferred result
Labor	Ray Maher	11,026	51.3	
Liberal	Russell Newton	10,457	48.7	
Labor hold		Swing		

=== Orange ===
1959 New South Wales state election: Orange
Party	Candidate	Votes	%	±%
Country	Charles Cutler	11,155	61.0	
Labor	Lloyd Stapleton	7,119	39.0	
Total formal votes		18,274	99.1	
Informal votes		163	0.9	
Turnout		18,437	94.8	
Country hold		Swing		

=== Oxley ===
1959 New South Wales state election: Oxley
Party	Candidate	Votes	%	±%
Country	Les Jordan	13,029	67.2	
Independent	Duncan Kennedy	4,774	24.6	
Independent	Joseph Cordner	1,597	8.2	
Total formal votes		19,400	98.7	
Informal votes		256	1.3	
Turnout		19,656	96.1	
Two-candidate-preferred result
Country	Les Jordan	13,828	71.3	
Independent	Duncan Kennedy	5,572	28.7	
Country hold		Swing		

=== Paddington−Waverley ===
1959 New South Wales state election: Paddington-Waverley
Party	Candidate	Votes	%	±%
Labor	William Ferguson	13,235	62.7	
Liberal	Jack Cole	6,490	30.7	
Independent	Cyril Hutchings	737	3.5	
Communist	Bernard Rosen	657	3.1	
Total formal votes		21,119	97.1	
Informal votes		622	2.9	
Turnout		21,741	90.4	
Two-party-preferred result
Labor	William Ferguson	14,130	66.9	
Liberal	Jack Cole	6,989	33.1	
Labor notional hold				

The Labor-held seats of Paddington and Waverley were combined into one seat.

=== Parramatta ===
1959 New South Wales state election: Parramatta
Party	Candidate	Votes	%	±%
Labor	Dan Mahoney	13,647	53.9	
Liberal	William Pickard	10,850	42.8	
Democratic Labor	Carlyle Dalgleish	842	3.3	
Total formal votes		25,339	98.6	
Informal votes		354	1.4	
Turnout		25,693	95.2	
Two-party-preferred result
Labor	Dan Mahoney	13,815	54.5	
Liberal	William Pickard	11,524	45.5	
Labor gain from Liberal		Swing		

=== Phillip ===
1959 New South Wales state election: Phillip
Party	Candidate	Votes	%	±%
Labor	Pat Hills	15,487	69.4	
Liberal	Warwick Dunkley	5,539	24.8	
Communist	Ernie Thornton	1,276	5.7	
Total formal votes		22,302	96.7	
Informal votes		771	3.3	
Turnout		23,073	89.0	
Two-party-preferred result
Labor	Pat Hills	16,508	74.0	
Liberal	Warwick Dunkley	5,794	26.0	
Labor hold		Swing		

=== Raleigh ===
1959 New South Wales state election: Raleigh
Party	Candidate	Votes	%	±%
Labor	William Bailey	7,775	40.1	
Country	Jim Brown	5,967	30.8	
Independent Country	Radford Gamack (defeated)	5,639	29.1	
Total formal votes		19,381	99.0	
Informal votes		189	1.0	
Turnout		19,570	94.5	
Two-party-preferred result
Country	Jim Brown	10,776	55.6	
Labor	William Bailey	8,605	44.4	
Country hold		Swing		

The sitting member Radford Gamack had been elected as a Country member, but contested this election as an independent.

=== Randwick ===
1959 New South Wales state election: Randwick
Party	Candidate	Votes	%	±%
Labor	William Gollan	11,938	56.6	
Liberal	Graham Price	8,667	41.1	
Democratic Labor	Cecil Russell	503	2.4	
Total formal votes		21,108	98.4	
Informal votes		340	1.6	
Turnout		21,448	93.5	
Two-party-preferred result
Labor	William Gollan	12,039	57.0	
Liberal	Graham Price	9,069	43.0	
Labor hold		Swing		

=== Redfern ===
1959 New South Wales state election: Redfern
Party	Candidate	Votes	%	±%
Labor	Fred Green	15,520	76.5	
Liberal	Mary Beckett	4,032	19.9	
Communist	Arthur Shipton	744	3.7	
Total formal votes		20,296	97.4	
Informal votes		540	2.6	
Turnout		20,836	92.6	
Two-party-preferred result
Labor	Fred Green	16,115	79.4	
Liberal	Mary Beckett	4,181	20.6	
Labor hold		Swing		

=== Rockdale ===
1959 New South Wales state election: Rockdale
Party	Candidate	Votes	%	±%
Labor	Brian Bannon	10,035	46.1	
Liberal	Ronald Hislop	9,426	43.3	
Independent	Arthur Henderson	1,587	7.3	
Democratic Labor	Wesley Johns	742	3.4	
Total formal votes		21,790	98.0	
Informal votes		449	2.0	
Turnout		22,239	95.0	
Two-party-preferred result
Labor	Brian Bannon	11,208	51.4	
Liberal	Ronald Hislop	10,582	48.6	
Labor hold		Swing		

=== Ryde ===
1959 New South Wales state election: Ryde
Party	Candidate	Votes	%	±%
Labor	Frank Downing	13,454	51.5	
Liberal	Ian Millar	11,768	45.0	
Democratic Labor	Francis Bull	925	3.5	
Total formal votes		26,147	98.7	
Informal votes		352	1.3	
Turnout		26,499	95.7	
Two-party-preferred result
Labor	Frank Downing	13,639	52.2	
Liberal	Ian Millar	12,508	47.8	
Labor hold		Swing		

=== South Coast ===
1959 New South Wales state election: South Coast
Party	Candidate	Votes	%	±%
Liberal	Jack Beale	11,501	65.5	
Independent	Douglas Glass	6,049	34.5	
Total formal votes		17,550	98.8	
Informal votes		204	1.2	
Turnout		17,754	94.8	
Liberal hold		Swing		

=== Sturt ===
1959 New South Wales state election: Sturt
Party	Candidate	Votes	%	±%
Labor	William Wattison	10,034	68.0	
Country	Edward Brown	3,016	20.4	
Democratic Labor	George Mailath	1,277	8.6	
Communist	Edward Craill	435	3.0	
Total formal votes		14,762	98.3	
Informal votes		262	1.7	
Turnout		15,024	88.3	
Two-party-preferred result
Labor	William Wattison	10,637	72.1	
Country	Edward Brown	4,125	27.9	
Labor hold		Swing		

=== Sutherland ===
1959 New South Wales state election: Sutherland
Party	Candidate	Votes	%	±%
Labor	Tom Dalton	11,845	50.2	
Liberal	Keith Bates	10,783	45.7	
Communist	Alexander Elphinston	680	2.9	
Democratic Labor	Peter Keogh	299	1.3	
Total formal votes		23,607	98.5	
Informal votes		351	1.5	
Turnout		23,958	96.1	
Two-party-preferred result
Labor	Tom Dalton	12,449	52.7	
Liberal	Keith Bates	11,158	47.3	
Labor gain from Liberal		Swing		

The sitting member Ian Griffith (Liberal) successfully contested Cronulla.

=== Tamworth ===
1959 New South Wales state election: Tamworth
Party	Candidate	Votes	%	±%
Country	Bill Chaffey	unopposed		
Country hold				

=== Temora ===
1959 New South Wales state election: Temora
Party	Candidate	Votes	%	±%
Country	Doug Dickson	unopposed		
Country hold				

=== Tenterfield ===
1959 New South Wales state election: Tenterfield
Party	Candidate	Votes	%	±%
Country	Michael Bruxner	9,280	68.1	
Labor	Herbert Pottie	4,352	31.9	
Total formal votes		13,632	98.9	
Informal votes		156	1.1	
Turnout		13,788	91.9	
Country hold		Swing		

=== Upper Hunter ===
1959 New South Wales state election: Upper Hunter
Party	Candidate	Votes	%	±%
Labor	Geoffrey Heuston	6,564	40.8	
Country	Leon Punch	6,430	40.0	
Independent	George Adams	2,025	12.6	
Independent	John Moore	1,066	6.6	
Total formal votes		16,085	98.4	
Informal votes		263	1.6	
Turnout		16,348	96.7	
Two-party-preferred result
Country	Leon Punch	8,442	52.5	
Labor	Geoffrey Heuston	7,643	47.5	
Country hold		Swing		

=== Vaucluse ===
1959 New South Wales state election: Vaucluse
Party	Candidate	Votes	%	±%
Liberal	Geoffrey Cox	unopposed		
Liberal hold				

=== Wagga Wagga ===
1959 New South Wales state election: Wagga Wagga
Party	Candidate	Votes	%	±%
Liberal	Wal Fife	9,571	54.9	
Labor	Dudley Graham	6,615	38.0	
Democratic Labor	Robert Harris	1,239	7.1	
Total formal votes		17,425	98.8	
Informal votes		207	1.2	
Turnout		17,632	94.4	
Two-party-preferred result
Liberal	Wal Fife	10,562	60.6	
Labor	Dudley Graham	6,863	39.4	
Liberal gain from Labor		Swing		

Eddie Graham (Labor) died and Wal Fife (Liberal) won the resulting by-election.

=== Waratah ===
1959 New South Wales state election: Waratah
Party	Candidate	Votes	%	±%
Independent	Frank Purdue	9,472	53.3	
Labor	Edward Greaves	8,292	46.7	
Total formal votes		17,764	98.9	
Informal votes		197	1.1	
Turnout		17,961	96.1	
Independent hold		Swing		

=== Willoughby ===
1959 New South Wales state election: Willoughby
Party	Candidate	Votes	%	±%
Liberal	George Brain	unopposed		
Liberal hold				

=== Wollondilly ===
1959 New South Wales state election: Wollondilly
Party	Candidate	Votes	%	±%
Liberal	Tom Lewis	12,591	60.9	
Labor	Ernest Seager	8,091	39.1	
Total formal votes		20,682	98.6	
Informal votes		284	1.4	
Turnout		20,966	95.3	
Liberal hold		Swing		

=== Wollongong−Kembla ===
1959 New South Wales state election: Wollongong−Kembla
Party	Candidate	Votes	%	±%
Labor	Rex Connor	11,515	58.4	
Liberal	Jack Hough	8,211	41.6	
Total formal votes		19,726	97.6	
Informal votes		475	2.4	
Turnout		20,201	93.7	
Labor hold		Swing		

=== Woollahra ===
1959 New South Wales state election: Woollahra
Party	Candidate	Votes	%	±%
Liberal	Vernon Treatt	unopposed		
Liberal hold				

=== Young ===
1959 New South Wales state election: Young
Party	Candidate	Votes	%	±%
Labor	Ernest McDermott	7,322	38.9	
Country	George Freudenstein	6,495	34.5	
Liberal	Raymond Oliver	4,245	22.6	
Democratic Labor	John Hogan	743	4.0	
Total formal votes		18,805	99.0	
Informal votes		195	1.0	
Turnout		19,000	95.4	
Two-party-preferred result
Country	George Freudenstein	10,967	58.3	
Labor	Ernest McDermott	7,838	41.7	
Country gain from Labor		Swing		

== See also ==
- Candidates of the 1959 New South Wales state election
- Members of the New South Wales Legislative Assembly, 1959–1962
