= Electoral results for the district of North Sydney =

Election results for state seat of North Sydney, New South Wales, Australia

North Sydney, an electoral district of the Legislative Assembly in the Australian state of New South Wales was created in 1927 and abolished in 1962.

Election	Member	Party
1927	Ernest Marks	Nationalist
1930	Ben Howe	Labor
1932	Hubert Primrose	United Australia
1935	Hubert Primrose	United Australia
1938	Hubert Primrose	United Australia
1941	James Geraghty	Labor
1944	James Geraghty	Labor
1947	James Geraghty	Labor
1950	James Geraghty	Independent Labor
1953	Ray Maher	Labor
1956	Ray Maher	Labor
1959	Ray Maher	Labor

== Election results ==
=== Elections in the 1950s ===
==== 1959 ====
1959 New South Wales state election: North Sydney
Party	Candidate	Votes	%	±%
Labor	Ray Maher	10,694	49.8	
Liberal	Russell Newton	9,513	44.3	
Democratic Labor	Michael Fitzpatrick	899	4.2	
Independent	Francis Ferry	377	1.7	
Total formal votes		21,483	97.6	
Informal votes		526	2.4	
Turnout		22,009	93.1	
Two-party-preferred result
Labor	Ray Maher	11,026	51.3	
Liberal	Russell Newton	10,457	48.7	
Labor hold		Swing		

==== 1956 ====
1956 New South Wales state election: North Sydney
Party	Candidate	Votes	%	±%
Labor	Ray Maher	9,827	48.6	+16.2
Liberal	Peter Murphy	9,771	48.3	+13.4
Communist	Bill Wood	637	3.1	+3.1
Total formal votes		20,235	98.5	+1.0
Informal votes		302	1.5	−1.0
Turnout		20,537	93.2	−0.5
Two-party-preferred result
Labor	Ray Maher	10,281	50.8	−5.2
Liberal	Peter Murphy	9,954	49.2	+5.2
Labor hold		Swing	−5.2	

==== 1953 ====
1953 New South Wales state election: North Sydney
Party	Candidate	Votes	%	±%
Liberal	Trevor Humphries	7,377	34.9	
Labor	Ray Maher	6,842	32.4	
Independent Labor	James Geraghty	6,718	31.8	
Independent	Norman Jacobs	187	0.9	
Total formal votes		21,124	97.5	
Informal votes		551	2.5	
Turnout		21,675	93.7	
Two-party-preferred result
Labor	Ray Maher	11,837	56.0	
Liberal	Trevor Humphries	9,287	44.0	
Labor gain from Independent Labor		Swing		

==== 1950 ====
1950 New South Wales state election: North Sydney
Party	Candidate	Votes	%	±%
Liberal	Bjarne Halvorsen	8,367	41.6	
Independent Labor	James Geraghty	7,829	38.9	
Labor	Ray Maher	3,921	19.5	
Total formal votes		20,117	98.5	
Informal votes		301	1.5	
Turnout		20,418	93.5	
Two-candidate-preferred result
Independent Labor	James Geraghty	11,354	56.4	
Liberal	Bjarne Halvorsen	8,763	43.6	
Member changed to Independent Labor from Labor		Swing	N/A	

The sitting member was James Geraghty who had been elected as a Labor candidate, however he was disendorsed as a result of voting in the election for the Legislative Council and stood as an independent labor candidate.

=== Elections in the 1940s ===
==== 1947 ====
1947 New South Wales state election: North Sydney
Party	Candidate	Votes	%	±%
Labor	James Geraghty	11,867	49.3	+3.6
Liberal	William Travers	11,105	46.1	+11.9
Communist	Bill Wood	1,100	4.6	+4.6
Total formal votes		24,072	98.6	+2.1
Informal votes		332	1.4	−2.1
Turnout		24,404	94.7	+0.1
Two-party-preferred result
Labor	James Geraghty	12,717	52.8	−4.5
Liberal	William Travers	11,355	47.2	+4.5
Labor hold		Swing	−4.5	

==== 1944 ====
1944 New South Wales state election: North Sydney
Party	Candidate	Votes	%	±%
Labor	James Geraghty	9,844	45.7	+1.7
Democratic	William Harding	7,358	34.2	−9.9
Lang Labor	Ainslie Beecraft	3,095	14.4	+14.4
Liberal Democratic	Ebenezer Minnis	1,244	5.8	+5.8
Total formal votes		21,541	96.5	−1.6
Informal votes		782	3.5	+1.6
Turnout		22,323	94.6	+2.6
Two-party-preferred result
Labor	James Geraghty	12,333	57.3	+3.4
Democratic	William Harding	9,208	42.7	−3.4
Labor hold		Swing	+3.4	

==== 1941 ====
1941 New South Wales state election: North Sydney
Party	Candidate	Votes	%	±%
United Australia	Hubert Primrose	9,112	44.1	
Labor	James Geraghty	9,090	44.0	
State Labor	William Wilson	2,448	11.9	
Total formal votes		20,650	98.1	
Informal votes		399	1.9	
Turnout		21,049	92.0	
Two-party-preferred result
Labor	James Geraghty	11,122	53.9	
United Australia	Hubert Primrose	9,528	46.1	
Labor gain from United Australia		Swing		

=== Elections in the 1930s ===
==== 1938 ====
1938 New South Wales state election: North Sydney
Party	Candidate	Votes	%	±%
United Australia	Hubert Primrose	10,836	58.5	+2.9
Labor	Henry Clayden	7,692	41.5	+4.4
Total formal votes		18,528	97.9	+0.4
Informal votes		399	2.1	−0.4
Turnout		18,927	94.7	−1.7
United Australia hold		Swing	N/A	

==== 1935 ====
1935 New South Wales state election: North Sydney
Party	Candidate	Votes	%	±%
United Australia	Hubert Primrose	9,773	55.6	−3.0
Labor (NSW)	Ben Howe	6,518	37.1	+1.4
Ind. United Australia	Leslie Dare	736	4.2	+4.2
Federal Labor	Thomas Lavelle	537	3.1	−0.1
Total formal votes		17,564	97.5	−0.4
Informal votes		448	2.5	+0.4
Turnout		18,012	96.4	+0.1
United Australia hold		Swing	N/A	

- Preferences were not distributed.

==== 1932 ====
1932 New South Wales state election: North Sydney
Party	Candidate	Votes	%	±%
United Australia	Hubert Primrose	9,943	58.6	+12.7
Labor (NSW)	Ben Howe	6,052	35.7	−16.4
Federal Labor	Cecil Murphy	544	3.2	+3.2
Independent	Lucy Gullett	332	2.0	+2.0
Independent	Edward Clark	89	0.5	+0.5
Total formal votes		16,960	97.9	+1.1
Informal votes		367	2.1	−1.1
Turnout		17,327	96.3	+2.3
United Australia gain from Labor (NSW)		Swing	N/A	

- Preferences were not distributed.

==== 1930 ====
1930 New South Wales state election: North Sydney
Party	Candidate	Votes	%	±%
Labor	Ben Howe	8,739	52.1	
Nationalist	Ernest Marks (defeated)	7,696	45.9	
Independent	Alfred Waterhouse	252	1.5	
Communist	John Loughran	45	0.3	
Independent	Thomas Taprell	32	0.2	
Total formal votes		16,764	96.8	
Informal votes		562	3.2	
Turnout		17,326	94.0	
Labor gain from Nationalist		Swing		

=== Elections in the 1920s ===
==== 1927 ====
1927 New South Wales state election: North Sydney
Party	Candidate	Votes	%	±%
Nationalist	Ernest Marks	6,704	53.2	
Labor	Ben Howe	5,850	46.4	
Independent	Harry Meatheringham	43	0.3	
Total formal votes		12,597	98.9	
Informal votes		144	1.1	
Turnout		12,741	79.6	
Nationalist win		(new seat)		
