= Candidates of the 1959 New South Wales state election =

This is a list of candidates of the 1959 New South Wales state election. The election was held on 21 March 1959.

== Retiring Members ==
=== Labor ===
- Fred Cahill (Young)
- George Campbell (Hamilton)
- John Crook (Cessnock)
- John Freeman (Blacktown)
- John McGrath (Rockdale)
- Maurice O'Sullivan (Paddington)

=== Liberal ===
- Jim Clough (Parramatta)

=== Country ===
- D'Arcy Rose (Upper Hunter)

== Legislative Assembly ==
Sitting members are shown in bold text. Successful candidates are highlighted in the relevant colour.

Electorate	Held by	Labor candidate	Coalition candidate	Other candidates
Albury	Liberal	Reginald Garland	**Doug Padman** (Lib)	Lawrence Esler (DLP)
Armidale	Country	Percy Love	**Davis Hughes** (CP)	Richard Stanley (DLP)
Ashfield-Croydon	notional Liberal	John McCartney	**David Hunter** (Lib)	
Ashfield-Croydon	notional Liberal	John McCartney	**Richard Murden** (Lib)	
Auburn	Labor	**Thomas Ryan**	John Steel (Lib)	
Balmain	Labor	**John McMahon**	Sabina Greenman (Lib)	Stan Moran (CPA)
Bankstown	Labor	**Spence Powell**	Frederick Howe (Lib)	Jack Hughes (CPA); Charles Reid (Ind)
Barwon	Country	Thomas Burt	**Geoff Crawford** (CP)	
Bathurst	Labor	**Gus Kelly**	Campbell Alexander (Lib)	
Blacktown	Labor	Jim Southee	Alfred Dennis (Lib)	Frank Finlayson (Ind); Francis Moffitt (DLP)
Bondi	Labor	**Abe Landa**	Carl Jeppesen (Lib)	Charles Massey (DLP)
Bulli	Labor	**Rex Jackson**	Donald Heggie (Lib)	Frederick Watson (CPA)
Burrinjuck	Labor	**Bill Sheahan**	Allan Johnson (CP)	
Burwood	Liberal	John Cunningham	**Ben Doig** (Lib)	
Byron	Country		**Stanley Stephens** (CP)	
Canterbury	Labor	**Arthur Tonge**	William Dowd (Lib)	
Casino	Country		**Ian Robinson** (CP)	
Castlereagh	Labor	**Jack Renshaw**	Calverley Brown (CP)	
Cessnock	Labor	George Neilly		Charles Haxton (Ind); David Stevenson (CPA)
Clarence	Country		**Bill Weiley (CP)**	
Cobar	Labor	**Ernest Wetherell**		
Collaroy	Liberal	Erwin Eder	**Robert Askin** (Lib)	
Concord	Labor	**Thomas Murphy**	Lerryn Mutton (Lib)	Jack Kane (DLP)
Coogee	Liberal	Lou Walsh	**Kevin Ellis** (Lib)	Allan Carter (DLP)
Cook's River	Labor	**Joseph Cahill**	Athol McCoy (Lib)	Charles Higbid (Ind)
Cronulla	notional Liberal	George Neilson	**Ian Griffith** (Lib)	
Drummoyne	Liberal	Roy Jackson	**Walter Lawrence** (Lib)	
Dubbo	Labor	**Clarrie Robertson**	Les Ford (Lib)	Brian Adams (DLP)
Dubbo	Labor	**Clarrie Robertson**	Roderick Mack (CP)	Brian Adams (DLP)
Dulwich Hill	Labor	**Cliff Mallam**	Joseph Hollis (Lib)	Owen Cahill (DLP)
Earlwood	Liberal	John Buckeridge	**Eric Willis** (Lib)	
East Hills	Labor	**Joe Kelly**	Allan Young (Lib)	John Bennett (Ind)
Eastwood	Liberal	William Browne	**Eric Hearnshaw** (Lib)	
Fairfield	Labor	**Clarrie Earl**	David Fairs (Lib)	Edwin Lipscombe (CPA)
Georges River	Liberal	Albert Kealman	**Douglas Cross**	Kevin Davis (DLP); Fitzgerald Mulholland (Ind)
Gloucester	Country		**Ray Fitzgerald** (CP)	Alan Borthwick (Ind)
Gordon	Liberal		**Stewart Fraser** (Lib)	
Gosford	Liberal	Reginald Smith	**Harold Jackson** (Lib)	
Goulburn	Labor	**Laurie Tully**	William Bladwell (Lib)	Charles O'Brien (DLP)
Granville	Labor	**Bill Lamb**	Robert Leech (Lib)	Harold Ewer (CPA)
Hamilton	Labor	Robert McCartney	Brian O'Loughlin (Lib)	John Daley (DLP)
Hartley	Labor	**Jim Robson**		Peter Carroll (CPA)
Hawkesbury	Labor	Kevin Dwyer	**Bernie Deane** (Lib)	
Hornsby	Liberal	Arthur Evans	**Sydney Storey** (Lib)	
Hurstville	Labor	Bill Rigby	Hedley Mallard (Lib)	**Clive Evatt** (Ind Lab); Edward Merryfull (Ind)
Illawarra	Labor	**Howard Fowles**		David Bowen (CPA); James Casey (Ind)
Kahibah	Labor	**Jack Stewart**	Eric Cupit (Lib)	
King	Labor	**Albert Sloss**	Adrian Cook (Lib)	Ron Maxwell (CPA)
Kogarah	Labor	**Bill Crabtree**	Jeffrey Skehan (Lib)	Thomas Brosnan (DLP); Jack McPhillips (CPA)
Kurri Kurri	Labor	**George Booth**		Charles Dumbrell (CPA)
Lake Macquarie	Labor	**Jim Simpson**		John Tapp (CPA)
Lakemba	Labor	**Stan Wyatt**	Dora Skelsey (Lib)	
Lane Cove	Liberal	Arthur Braddock	**Ken McCaw** (Lib)	Mary Gray (DLP)
Leichhardt	Labor	**Reg Coady**	Barney Morton (Lib)	
Lismore	Country		**Jack Easter** (CP)	Clyde Campbell (Ind)
Liverpool	Labor	**Jack Mannix**	Ron Dunbier (Lib)	
Liverpool Plains	Labor	**Roger Nott**	Frank O'Keefe (CP)	John Pender (Ind)
Maitland	Liberal	William Harvey	**Milton Morris** (Lib)	Douglas Drinkwater (DLP); Henry Ivins (Ind)
Manly	Liberal	Geoffrey Mill	**Douglas Darby** (Lib)	
Maroubra	Labor	**Bob Heffron**	George Anthony (Lib)	Jim Baird (CPA)
Marrickville	Labor	**Norm Ryan**	Michael Lazar (Lib)	
Merrylands	notional Labor	Jack Ferguson	Graham Cullis (Lib)	
Monaro	Labor	**John Seiffert**	Mark Flanagan (Lib)	
Mosman	Liberal		**Pat Morton** (Lib)	Bill Wood (CPA)
Mudgee	Labor	**Leo Nott**	Norman Griffith (CP); Jack Ives (Lib)	Donald Bennett (DLP)
Murray	Country	John Hayes	**Joe Lawson** (CP)	
Murrumbidgee	Labor	**George Enticknap**	Verdon Letheren (CP)	Sidney Braithwaite (Ind); Francis O'Connell (DLP)
Nepean	Liberal	John Carvan	**Bill Chapman** (Lib)	Mel McCalman (CPA)
Neutral Bay	Liberal		**Ivan Black** (Lib)	
Newcastle	Labor	**Frank Hawkins**	William Hutchinson (Lib)	Mervyn Copley (CPA)
North Sydney	Labor	**Ray Maher**	Russell Newton (Lib)	Francis Ferry (Ind); Michael Fitzpatrick (DLP)
Orange	Country	Lloyd Stapleton	**Charles Cutler** (CP)	
Oxley	Country		**Les Jordan** (CP)	Joe Cordner (Ind); Duncan Kennedy (Ind)
Paddington-Waverley	notional Labor	**William Ferguson**	Jack Cole (Lib)	Cyril Hutchings (Ind); Bernard Rosen (CPA)
Parramatta	Labor	Dan Mahoney	William Pickard (Lib)	Carlyle Dalgleish (DLP)
Phillip	Labor	**Pat Hills**	Warwick Dunkley (Lib)	Ernie Thornton (CPA)
Raleigh	Country	William Bailey	Jim Brown (CP)	**Radford Gamack** (Ind CP)
Randwick	Labor	**William Gollan**	Graham Price (Lib)	Cecil Russell (DLP)
Redfern	Labor	**Fred Green**	Mary Beckett (Lib)	Arthur Shipton (CPA)
Rockdale	Labor	Brian Bannon	Ronald Hislop	Arthur Henderson (Ind); Wesley Johns (DLP)
Ryde	Labor	**Frank Downing**	Ian Millar (Lib)	Francis Bull (DLP)
South Coast	Liberal		**Jack Beale** (Lib)	Douglas Glass (Ind)
Sturt	Labor	**William Wattison**	Edward Brown (CP)	Edward Craill (CPA); George Mailath (DLP)
Sutherland	Liberal	Tom Dalton	Keith Bates (Lib)	Alexander Elphinston (CPA); Peter Keogh (DLP)
Tamworth	Country		**Bill Chaffey** (CP)	
Temora	Country		**Doug Dickson** (CP)	
Tenterfield	Country	Herbert Pottie	**Michael Bruxner** (CP)	
Upper Hunter	Country	Geoffrey Heuston	Leon Punch (CP)	George Adams (Ind); John Moore (Ind)
Vaucluse	Liberal		**Geoffrey Cox** (Lib)	
Wagga Wagga	Liberal	Dudley Graham	**Wal Fife** (Lib)	Robert Harris (DLP)
Waratah	Independent	Edward Greaves		**Frank Purdue** (Ind)
Willoughby	Liberal		**George Brain** (Lib)	
Wollondilly	Liberal	Ernest Seager	**Tom Lewis** (Lib)	
Wollongong-Kembla	Labor	**Rex Connor**	Jack Hough (Lib)	
Woollahra	Liberal		**Vernon Treatt** (Lib)	
Young	Labor	Ernest McDermott	George Freudenstein (CP)	John Hogan (DLP)
Young	Labor	Ernest McDermott	Raymond Oliver (Lib)	John Hogan (DLP)

== See also ==
- Members of the New South Wales Legislative Assembly, 1959–1962
