= Electoral results for the district of Temora =

Election results for Temora, New South Wales, Australia

Temora, an electoral district of the Legislative Assembly in the Australian state of New South Wales, was created in 1927 and abolished in 1981.

Election	Member	Party
1927	Hugh Main	Country
1930	Hugh Main	Country
1932	Hugh Main	Country
1935	Hugh Main	Country
1938	Doug Dickson	Country
1941	Doug Dickson	Country
1944	Doug Dickson	Country
1947	Doug Dickson	Country
1950	Doug Dickson	Country
1953	Doug Dickson	Country
1956	Doug Dickson	Country
1959	Doug Dickson	Country
1960 by	Jim Taylor	Country
1962	Jim Taylor	Country
1965	Jim Taylor	Country
1968	Jim Taylor	Country
1971	Jim Taylor	Country
1973	Jim Taylor	Country
1975	Jim Taylor	Country
1978	Jim Taylor	Country

== Election results ==
=== Elections in the 1970s ===
==== 1978 ====
1978 New South Wales state election: Temora
Party	Candidate	Votes	%	±%
National Country	Jim Taylor	12,872	67.6	−0.1
Labor	Alroy Provan	6,154	32.4	+2.7
Total formal votes		19,026	98.4	−0.9
Informal votes		301	1.6	+0.9
Turnout		19,327	93.4	−1.2
National Country hold		Swing	−1.5	

==== 1976 ====
1976 New South Wales state election: Temora
Party	Candidate	Votes	%	±%
Country	Jim Taylor	12,860	67.7	+3.5
Labor	Alroy Provan	5,629	29.7	+3.7
Independent	Wesley Berryman	497	2.6	+2.6
Total formal votes		18,986	99.3	+0.3
Informal votes		126	0.7	−0.3
Turnout		19,112	94.6	+6.1
Two-party-preferred result
Country	Jim Taylor	13,138	69.2	−1.3
Labor	Alroy Provan	5,848	30.8	+1.3
Country hold		Swing	−1.3	

==== 1973 ====
1973 New South Wales state election: Temora
Party	Candidate	Votes	%	±%
Country	Jim Taylor	11,171	64.2	+12.7
Labor	Alroy Provan	4,520	26.0	−11.4
Democratic Labor	Terence Brady	959	5.5	+5.5
Independent	Donald Douglas	760	4.4	+4.4
Total formal votes		17,410	99.0	
Informal votes		170	1.0	
Turnout		17,580	88.5	
Two-party-preferred result
Country	Jim Taylor	12,274	70.5	+13.5
Labor	Alroy Provan	5,136	29.5	−13.5
Country hold		Swing	+13.5	

==== 1971 ====
1971 New South Wales state election: Temora
Party	Candidate	Votes	%	±%
Country	Jim Taylor	8,478	51.5	−14.5
Labor	Lyle Hoad	6,165	37.4	+13.5
Independent	Terence Brady	1,824	11.1	+11.1
Total formal votes		16,467	98.6	
Informal votes		238	1.4	
Turnout		16,705	93.7	
Two-party-preferred result
Country	Jim Taylor	9,390	57.0	−16.3
Labor	Lyle Hoad	7,077	43.0	+16.3
Country hold		Swing	−16.3	

=== Elections in the 1960s ===
==== 1968 ====
1968 New South Wales state election: Temora
Party	Candidate	Votes	%	±%
Country	Jim Taylor	12,863	66.0	−4.8
Labor	John O'Hara	4,664	23.9	−5.3
Democratic Labor	Garry Carroll	1,453	7.4	+7.4
Independent	Dorothy Frank	515	2.6	+2.6
Total formal votes		19,495	99.0	
Informal votes		199	1.0	
Turnout		19,694	95.0	
Two-party-preferred result
Country	Jim Taylor	14,282	73.3	+2.5
Labor	John O'Hara	5,213	26.7	−2.5
Country hold		Swing	+2.5	

==== 1965 ====
1965 New South Wales state election: Temora
Party	Candidate	Votes	%	±%
Country	Jim Taylor	11,244	70.8	+6.9
Labor	John Herridge	4,638	29.2	−6.9
Total formal votes		15,882	99.2	−0.1
Informal votes		122	0.8	+0.1
Turnout		16,004	96.1	+0.8
Country hold		Swing	+6.9	

==== 1962 ====
1962 New South Wales state election: Temora
Party	Candidate	Votes	%	±%
Country	Jim Taylor	10,094	63.9	
Labor	Lyle Hoad	5,708	36.1	
Total formal votes		15,802	99.3	
Informal votes		105	0.7	
Turnout		15,907	95.3	
Country hold		Swing	N/A	

==== 1960 by-election ====
1960 Temora by-election Saturday 8 October
Party	Candidate	Votes	%	±%
Country	Jim Taylor	8,210	58.9	
Labor	Lyle Hoad	5,737	41.1	
Total formal votes		13,947	98.4	
Informal votes		89	0.6	
Turnout		14,036	88.3	
Country hold		Swing	N/A	

Doug Dickson (Country) died.

=== Elections in the 1950s ===
==== 1959 ====
1959 New South Wales state election: Temora
Party	Candidate	Votes	%	±%
Country	Doug Dickson	unopposed		
Country hold				

==== 1956 ====
1956 New South Wales state election: Temora
Party	Candidate	Votes	%	±%
Country	Doug Dickson	10,039	64.4	+3.2
Labor	Hector Skidmore	5,549	35.6	−3.2
Total formal votes		15,588	99.0	+0.2
Informal votes		152	1.0	−0.2
Turnout		15,740	91.9	−2.2
Country hold		Swing	+3.2	

==== 1953 ====
1953 New South Wales state election: Temora
Party	Candidate	Votes	%	±%
Country	Doug Dickson	9,524	61.2	
Labor	Hector Skidmore	6,028	38.8	
Total formal votes		15,552	98.8	
Informal votes		184	1.2	
Turnout		15,736	94.1	
Country hold		Swing		

==== 1950 ====
1950 New South Wales state election: Temora
Party	Candidate	Votes	%	±%
Country	Doug Dickson	unopposed		
Country hold				

=== Elections in the 1940s ===
==== 1947 ====
1947 New South Wales state election: Temora
Party	Candidate	Votes	%	±%
Country	Doug Dickson	8,538	63.6	+11.5
Labor	Percy Lucas	4,876	36.4	−8.9
Total formal votes		13,414	98.8	+0.9
Informal votes		157	1.2	−0.9
Turnout		13,571	95.1	+4.4
Country hold		Swing	N/A	

==== 1944 ====
1944 New South Wales state election: Temora
Party	Candidate	Votes	%	±%
Country	Doug Dickson	6,658	52.1	−1.2
Labor	Laurie Tully	5,788	45.3	−1.4
Independent Labor	James King	339	2.6	+2.6
Total formal votes		12,785	97.9	−0.2
Informal votes		268	2.1	+0.2
Turnout		13,053	90.7	−2.0
Country hold		Swing	N/A	

- Preferences were not distributed.

==== 1941 ====
1941 New South Wales state election: Temora
Party	Candidate	Votes	%	±%
Country	Doug Dickson	7,325	53.3	
Labor	Charles Poole	6,409	46.7	
Total formal votes		13,734	98.1	
Informal votes		260	1.9	
Turnout		13,994	92.7	
Country hold		Swing		

=== Elections in the 1930s ===
==== 1938 ====
1938 New South Wales state election: Temora
Party	Candidate	Votes	%	±%
Country	Doug Dickson	3,225	27.0	−32.3
Country	Hugh Roberton	3,015	25.3	+25.3
Independent	Lancelot Redgrave	2,568	21.5	+21.5
Independent	Alfred Hollande	2,404	20.2	+20.2
Independent	Harold Munro	717	6.0	+6.0
Total formal votes		11,929	95.9	−2.4
Informal votes		513	4.1	+2.4
Turnout		12,442	96.4	+0.5
Two-candidate-preferred result
Country	Doug Dickson	6,618	55.5	−3.8
Independent	Lancelot Redgrave	5,311	44.5	+44.5
Country hold		Swing	N/A	

==== 1935 ====
1935 New South Wales state election: Temora
Party	Candidate	Votes	%	±%
Country	Hugh Main	7,290	59.3	−1.9
Labor (NSW)	Edward O'Neill	5,004	40.7	+4.7
Total formal votes		12,294	98.3	−0.2
Informal votes		212	1.7	+0.2
Turnout		12,506	95.9	−1.1
Country hold		Swing	N/A	

==== 1932 ====
1932 New South Wales state election: Temora
Party	Candidate	Votes	%	±%
Country	Hugh Main	7,202	61.2	+10.6
Labor (NSW)	Essell Hoad	4,238	36.0	−10.6
Independent Labor	James King	330	2.8	0.0
Total formal votes		11,770	98.5	+0.4
Informal votes		174	1.5	−0.4
Turnout		11,944	97.0	+1.0
Country hold		Swing	N/A	

- Preferences were not distributed.

==== 1930 ====
1930 New South Wales state election: Temora
Party	Candidate	Votes	%	±%
Country	Hugh Main	5,826	50.6	
Labor	Frank Hawkins	5,360	46.6	
Independent	James King	328	2.8	
Total formal votes		11,514	98.1	
Informal votes		219	1.9	
Turnout		11,733	96.0	
Country hold		Swing		

=== Elections in the 1920s ===
==== 1927 ====
1927 New South Wales state election: Temora
Party	Candidate	Votes	%	±%
Country	Hugh Main	7,692	65.6	
Labor	David Nilon	3,548	30.3	
Independent Labor	George Burgess	481	4.1	
Total formal votes		11,721	98.5	
Informal votes		181	1.5	
Turnout		11,902	79.9	
Country win		(new seat)		
