= Electoral results for the district of Ashfield-Croydon =

Election results for Ashfield-Croydon, New South Wales, Australia

Ashfield-Croydon, an electoral district of the Legislative Assembly in the Australian state of New South Wales, was created in 1959 and abolished in 1968.

| Election | Member | Party |
|---|---|---|
| 1959 | David Hunter | Liberal |
| 1962 | David Hunter | Liberal |
| 1965 | David Hunter | Liberal |

== Election results ==
=== Elections in the 1960s ===
==== 1965 ====
1965 New South Wales state election: Ashfield−Croydon
| Party | Candidate | Votes | % | ±% |
|---|---|---|---|---|
| Liberal | David Hunter | 14,194 | 60.5 | +4.0 |
| Labor | Wadim Jegorow | 8,814 | 37.6 | −5.9 |
| Independent | Raymond Sharrock | 445 | 1.9 | +1.9 |
| Total formal votes | | 23,453 | 97.9 | −0.8 |
| Informal votes | | 507 | 2.1 | +0.8 |
| Turnout | | 23,960 | 92.8 | 0.0 |
Two-party-preferred result
| Liberal | David Hunter | 14,417 | 61.5 | +5.0 |
| Labor | Wadim Jegorow | 9,036 | 38.5 | −5.0 |
| Liberal hold | | Swing | +5.0 | |

==== 1962 ====
1962 New South Wales state election: Ashfield−Croydon
| Party | Candidate | Votes | % | ±% |
|---|---|---|---|---|
| Liberal | David Hunter | 13,662 | 56.5 | +19.1 |
| Labor | Brian Hannelly | 10,503 | 43.5 | +7.8 |
| Total formal votes | | 24,165 | 98.7 | |
| Informal votes | | 312 | 1.3 | |
| Turnout | | 24,477 | 92.8 | |
| Liberal hold | | Swing | −5.4 | |

=== Elections in the 1950s ===
==== 1959 ====
1959 New South Wales state election: Ashfield−Croydon
| Party | Candidate | Votes | % | ±% |
|---|---|---|---|---|
| Liberal | David Hunter | 8,207 | 37.4 | |
| Labor | John McCartney | 7,838 | 35.7 | |
| Liberal | Richard Murden (defeated) | 5,920 | 26.9 | |
| Total formal votes | | 21,965 | 98.7 | |
| Informal votes | | 284 | 1.3 | |
| Turnout | | 22,249 | 93.6 | |
Two-party-preferred result
| Liberal | David Hunter | 13,607 | 61.9 | |
| Labor | John McCartney | 8,358 | 38.1 | |
| Liberal notional hold | | | | |

Ashfield, held by Richard Murden (Liberal) and Croydon, held by David Hunter (Liberal) were combined into one seat.
