= Electoral results for the district of Croydon =

Electoral results for the district of Croydon may refer to:

- Electoral results for the district of Croydon (South Australia), electoral results for the district of the South Australian House of Assembly
- Electoral results for the district of Croydon (Victoria), electoral results for the district of the Victorian Legislative Assembly
- Electoral results for the district of Croydon (New South Wales), electoral results for the former district of the New South Wales Legislative Assembly
- Electoral results for the district of Croydon (Queensland), electoral results for the former district of the Queensland Legislative Assembly
