= 1961 Paddington-Waverley state by-election =

- 25 February 1961

Electoral district of Paddington-Waverley in the New South Wales Legislative Assembly
- Registered: 21,898
- Turnout: 69.01% (▼21.4)

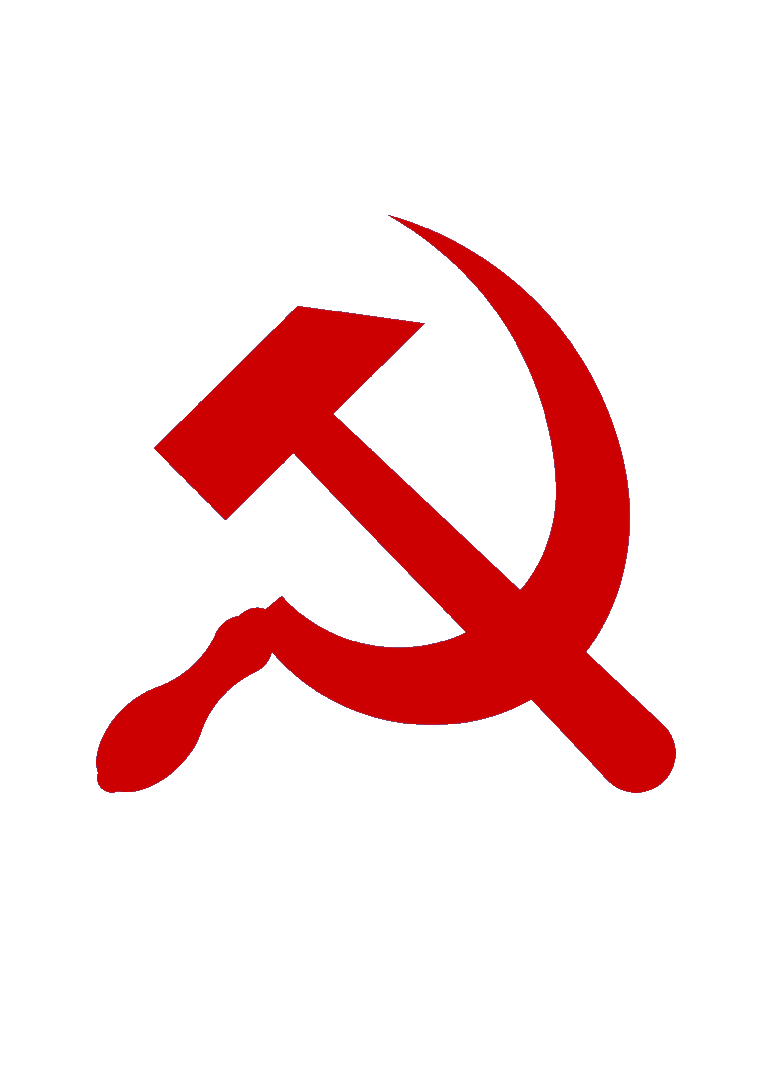
	First party	Second party
Candidate	Keith Anderson	Edward Maher
Party	Labor	Communist
Primary vote	12,972	1,227
Percentage	91.36%	8.64%
Swing	▲28.7	▲5.5
MP before election
William Ferguson
Labor
Elected MP
Keith Anderson
Labor

The 1961 Paddington-Waverley state by-election was held on 25 February 1961 to elect the member for Paddington-Waverley in the New South Wales Legislative Assembly, following the death of Labor Party MP William Ferguson.

Labor candidate Keith Anderson was elected with a 28.7% primary vote swing in his favour. The only other candidate was Edward Maher from the Communist Party, who received 9.64% of the vote.

This was the final election held in Paddington-Waverley, which was abolished ahead of the 1962 New South Wales state election, having only been created one election prior in 1959.

== Key events ==
- 29 January 1961 − William Ferguson died
- 6 February 1961 − Writ of election issued by the Speaker of the Legislative Assembly
- 10 February 1961 − Candidate nominations
- 25 February 1961 − Polling day
- 24 March 1961 − Return of writ

== Result ==
1961 Paddington-Waverley state by-election
Party	Candidate	Votes	%	±%
Labor	Keith Anderson	12,972	91.36	+28.7
Communist	Edward Maher	1,227	8.64	+5.5
Total formal votes		14,199	93.95	−3.1
Informal votes		912	6.05	+3.1
Turnout		15,111	69.01	−21.4
Labor hold				

== See also ==
- Electoral results for the district of Paddington-Waverley
