= 1940 Croydon state by-election =

Election result for Croydon, New South Wales, Australia

A by-election was held for the New South Wales Legislative Assembly electorate of Croydon on 7 September 1940 because of the resignation of Bertram Stevens (United Australia), to contest the federal seat of Lang in the 1940 election, however, he was unsuccessful.

== Dates ==
Date	Event
12 August 1940	Bertram Stevens resigned.
20 August 1940	Writ of election issued by the Speaker of the Legislative Assembly and close of electoral rolls.
27 August 1940	Nominations
7 September 1940	Polling day, between the hours of 8 am and 8 pm
21 September 1940	Return of writ
21 September 1940	Federal election

== Candidates ==
- Hector Robert (Bob) Hunt (Ind. United Australia) was a Sydney solicitor, who with his brother Edward Allan (Ted), established the firm Hunt and Hunt.
- David Hunter (United Australia) was an insurance broker who had been blind since he was six.
- (Frederick) Harold Reed (Ind. United Australia) was an Alderman on Burwood Council and a former Mayor.
- George Weir (Labor) was a barrister and former president of the Australian Public Service Federation.
- Robert Gordon Woolston (Independent) was a brass moulder and vice-president of the Croydon Branch of United Australia.

== Result ==
1940 Croydon state by-election
Party	Candidate	Votes	%	±%
Labor	George Weir	6,249	38.9	
United Australia	David Hunter	4,693	29.2	
Ind. United Australia	Harold Reed	3,955	24.6	
Ind. United Australia	Bob Hunt	1,091	6.8	
Independent	Robert Woolston	60	0.4	
Total formal votes		16,048	95.8	+1.9
Informal votes		707	4.2	−1.9
Turnout		16,755	88.2	−6.5
Two-party-preferred result
United Australia	David Hunter	9,003	56.1	−13.5
Labor	George Weir	7,045	43.9	
United Australia hold		Swing	−13.5	

== See also ==
- Electoral results for the district of Croydon (New South Wales)
- List of New South Wales state by-elections
