= Electoral results for the district of Croydon (New South Wales) =

Election results for Croydon, New South Wales, Australia

Croydon, an electoral district of the Legislative Assembly in the Australian state of New South Wales was created in 1927 and abolished in 1959.

	Member	Party
1927	Bertram Stevens	Nationalist
1930	Bertram Stevens	Nationalist
1932	Bertram Stevens	United Australia
1935	Bertram Stevens	United Australia
1938	Bertram Stevens	United Australia
1940 by	David Hunter	United Australia
1941	David Hunter	United Australia
1944	David Hunter	Democratic
1947	David Hunter	Liberal
1950	David Hunter	Liberal
1953	David Hunter	Liberal
1956	David Hunter	Liberal

== Election results ==
=== Elections in the 1950s ===
==== 1956 ====
1956 New South Wales state election: Croydon
Party	Candidate	Votes	%	±%
Liberal	David Hunter	11,545	61.6	+6.7
Labor	Frank Zions	7,185	38.4	−6.7
Total formal votes		18,730	98.8	+0.5
Informal votes		234	1.2	−0.5
Turnout		18,964	93.0	−0.7
Liberal hold		Swing	+6.7	

==== 1953 ====
1953 New South Wales state election: Croydon
Party	Candidate	Votes	%	±%
Liberal	David Hunter	10,844	54.9	
Labor	Kenneth Guthrie	8,924	45.1	
Total formal votes		19,768	98.3	
Informal votes		337	1.7	
Turnout		20,105	93.7	
Liberal hold		Swing		

==== 1950 ====
1950 New South Wales state election: Croydon
Party	Candidate	Votes	%	±%
Liberal	David Hunter	unopposed		
Liberal hold				

=== Elections in the 1940s ===
==== 1947 ====
1947 New South Wales state election: Croydon
Party	Candidate	Votes	%	±%
Liberal	David Hunter	13,838	62.5	+0.5
Labor	Clive Leroy	8,292	37.5	+37.5
Total formal votes		22,130	98.6	+3.5
Informal votes		307	1.4	−3.5
Turnout		22,437	93.9	+3.1
Liberal hold		Swing	N/A	

==== 1944 ====
1944 New South Wales state election: Croydon
Party	Candidate	Votes	%	±%
Democratic	David Hunter	12,120	62.0	+5.0
Independent	David Knox	7,433	38.0	+38.0
Total formal votes		19,553	95.1	−2.1
Informal votes		997	4.9	+2.1
Turnout		20,550	90.8	−2.3
Democratic hold		Swing	N/A	

==== 1941 ====
1941 New South Wales state election: Croydon
Party	Candidate	Votes	%	±%
United Australia	David Hunter	11,074	57.0	
Labor	Daniel Murphy	8,342	43.0	
Total formal votes		19,416	97.2	
Informal votes		554	2.8	
Turnout		19,970	93.1	
United Australia hold		Swing		

==== 1940 by-election ====
1940 Croydon state by-election
Party	Candidate	Votes	%	±%
Labor	George Weir	6,249	38.9	
United Australia	David Hunter	4,693	29.2	
Ind. United Australia	Harold Reed	3,955	24.6	
Ind. United Australia	Bob Hunt	1,091	6.8	
Independent	Robert Woolston	60	0.4	
Total formal votes		16,048	95.8	+1.9
Informal votes		707	4.2	−1.9
Turnout		16,755	88.2	−6.5
Two-party-preferred result
United Australia	David Hunter	9,003	56.1	−13.5
Labor	George Weir	7,045	43.9	
United Australia hold		Swing	−13.5	

The by-election was caused by the resignation of Bertram Stevens (United Australia), to contest the federal seat of Lang at the 1940 election.

=== Elections in the 1930s ===
==== 1938 ====
1938 New South Wales state election: Croydon
Party	Candidate	Votes	%	±%
United Australia	Bertram Stevens	11,765	69.6	+5.1
Independent	Garry Gordon	5,142	30.4	+30.4
Total formal votes		16,907	93.9	−4.5
Informal votes		1,104	6.1	+4.5
Turnout		18,011	94.7	−1.2
United Australia hold		Swing	N/A	

==== 1935 ====
1935 New South Wales state election: Croydon
Party	Candidate	Votes	%	±%
United Australia	Bertram Stevens	11,058	64.5	−5.9
Labor (NSW)	Archibald Pattinson	4,083	23.8	−5.8
Social Credit	Harold Bondeson	1,996	11.7	+11.7
Total formal votes		17,137	98.4	−0.5
Informal votes		282	1.6	+0.5
Turnout		17,419	95.9	+0.6
United Australia hold		Swing	N/A	

- Preferences were not distributed.

==== 1932 ====
1932 New South Wales state election: Croydon
Party	Candidate	Votes	%	±%
United Australia	Bertram Stevens	11,962	70.4	+20.8
Labor (NSW)	John Eldridge	5,031	29.6	−10.1
Total formal votes		16,993	98.9	+0.8
Informal votes		195	1.1	−0.8
Turnout		17,188	95.3	+2.0
United Australia hold		Swing	+16.0	

==== 1930 ====
1930 New South Wales state election: Croydon
Party	Candidate	Votes	%	±%
Nationalist	Bertram Stevens	8,204	49.6	
Labor	Cecil Newsome	6,564	39.7	
Australian	Raymond Ritchie	1,683	10.2	
Communist	Samuel Aarons	96	0.6	
Total formal votes		16,547	98.1	
Informal votes		323	1.9	
Turnout		16,870	93.3	
Two-party-preferred result
Nationalist	Bertram Stevens	9,006	54.4	
Labor	Cecil Newsome	7,541	45.6	
Nationalist hold		Swing		

=== Elections in the 1920s ===
==== 1927 ====
1927 New South Wales state election: Croydon
Party	Candidate	Votes	%	±%
Nationalist	Bertram Stevens	10,019	66.4	
Labor	Ernest Cook	5,058	33.6	
Total formal votes		15,077	99.0	
Informal votes		159	1.0	
Turnout		15,236	83.2	
Nationalist win		(new seat)		
