= 1960 Temora state by-election =

Election result for Temora, New South Wales, Australia

A by-election was held for the New South Wales Legislative Assembly seat of Temora on Saturday 8 October 1960 and was triggered by the death of Doug Dickson (Country), who had been Deputy Leader of the party until 1958.

The Kurri Kurri by-election was held on the same day.

== Dates ==
Date	Event
27 July 1960	Doug Dickson died.
12 September 1960	Writ of election issued by the Speaker of the Legislative Assembly.
19 September 1960	Nominations
8 October 1960	Polling day
28 October 1960	Return of writ

== Result ==
1960 Temora by-election Saturday 8 October
Party	Candidate	Votes	%	±%
Country	Jim Taylor	8,210	58.9	
Labor	Lyle Hoad	5,737	41.1	
Total formal votes		13,947	98.4	
Informal votes		89	0.6	
Turnout		14,036	88.3	
Country hold		Swing	N/A	

== See also ==
- Electoral results for the district of Temora
- List of New South Wales state by-elections
