= James Geraghty =

James Geraghty may refer to:

- James Geraghty (Australian politician), member of the New South Wales Legislative Assembly
- James M. Geraghty, Irish American politician and judge
- Jim Geraghty, political correspondent of National Review
