= Hugh Main =

Australian politician

The Honourable Hugh Main

Minister for Agriculture
- In office 16 May 1932 – 1 April 1938
- Preceded by: Bill Dunn
- Succeeded by: Albert Reid

Minister for Forests
- In office 16 May 1932 – 17 June 1932
- Preceded by: Bill Dunn
- Succeeded by: Roy Vincent

Personal details
- Born: 22 August 1883 Ardrossan, Ayrshire, Scotland
- Died: 27 August 1961 (aged 78) Cootamundra, New South Wales, Australia
- Resting place: Cootamundra cemetery
- Party: Progressive (1920 – 1927; Country Party (1927 – 1957)
- Spouse: Joan Helen Trethgarten
- Children: 2 daughters and 1 son
- Awards: British War Medal Victory Medal

Military service
- Allegiance: Australia
- Branch/service: Australian Imperial Forces
- Years of service: 1916 – 1919
- Rank: Private; Main was honourably discharged as a Private, despite attaining the rank of Sergeant during service.
- Unit: 20th Battalion
- Battles/wars: World War I

Hugh Main (22 August 1883 – 27 August 1961) was an Australian politician. He was a member of the New South Wales Legislative Assembly from 1920 until 1938, representing the electorates of Cootamundra (1920–1927) and Temora (1927–1938). Initially elected as a Progressive, he was a member of the party's rural "True Blues" faction that by 1927 had evolved into the Country Party.

== Early years and military career ==
Main was born at Saltcoats on the west coast of Scotland, and was educated at Tonbridge School in England and St Peter's College and Roseworthy Agricultural College in South Australia. He worked as an orchardist at Clare for a time, before establishing a wheat and wool property "Retreat" at Illabo or Bethungra, New South Wales with his brother George around 1906. He was also a successful breeder of thoroughbred racehorses. Main enlisted in the 1st A.I.F. in 1916, and saw active service in France during World War I, rising to the rank of sergeant. He returned to his farm in 1919 with a highly regarded service record.

== Political career ==
Main entered politics for the first time at the 1920 state election, when he was endorsed as a Progressive for multi-member Cootamundra, elected as the third member ahead of the sitting member and premier, W. A. Holman. He campaigned hard on rural issues, distanced himself from city interests and won in one of the largest upsets in New South Wales history when he defeated the incumbent Premier, Nationalist William Holman, for the third and final seat. As a Progressive MLA, he was one of the "True Blues" led by (Sir) Michael Bruxner and D. H. Drummond who broke with the party leadership in 1921 to oppose a coalition with the Nationalists for the 1922 election. He was re-elected in 1922 and 1925 largely under the banner of the rural faction, and joined the other "True Blues" in joining the nascent Country Party in 1927. After the abolition of the multi-member system, Main contested and won the new electorate of Temora.

The conservatives in New South Wales won a landslide victory in 1932 under Nationalist leader Bertram Stevens, and Main was one of several Country Party MLAs invited to hold portfolios in a new coalition ministry. He became Minister for Agriculture on 16 May 1932; he also held the position of Minister for Forests for a brief period. In his new role, he aggressively pursued rural interests, including the development of improved farming infrastructure, the protection of small farmers, and reviewing legislation relevant to farming interests. He held the position until 1 April 1938, when he retired from both the ministry and from parliament. He was succeeded in Temora by Doug Dickson, a future deputy leader of the Country Party.

== Life after politics ==
In 1938, Main retired to his farm after leaving politics, but continued to be involved in the Country Party, and served on its executive council from 1956 to 1957.

== Personal ==
Main married Joan Helen Tregarthen (c. 1890 – 14 February 1974) at St Mark's, Darling Point on 30 January 1923. He died at Cootamundra on 27 August 1961 and was buried at Cootamundra cemetery with Presbyterian forms. She died in New South Wales, and her remains buried at Frenchs Forest.

New South Wales Legislative Assembly
Preceded by William Holman	Member for Cootamundra (multi-member); 1920 – 1927; Served alongside: Loughlin, G. McGirr, J. McGirr, Hoad	Succeeded by Ken Hoad
Preceded by New seat	Member for Temora (single-member); 1927 – 1938	Succeeded by Doug Dickson
