= Electoral results for the district of Croydon (Victoria) =

Victoria, Australia, district election results

This is a list of electoral results for the Electoral district of Croydon in Victoria (Australia) state elections.

== Members for Croydon ==
Member	Party	Term
David Hodgett	Liberal	2014–present

== Election results ==
=== Elections in the 2020s ===
2022 Victorian state election: Croydon
Party	Candidate	Votes	%	±%
Liberal	David Hodgett	19,605	43.0	−3.4
Labor	Sorina Grasso	15,564	34.1	−5.5
Greens	Brendan Powell	4,940	10.8	+1.9
Family First	Dan Nebauer	2,051	4.5	+4.5
Democratic Labour	Sophia De Wit	1,978	4.3	+4.3
Animal Justice	Harley McDonald-Eckersall	1,501	3.3	−1.2
Total formal votes		45,639	95.7	+0.8
Informal votes		2,054	4.3	−0.8
Turnout		47,693	90.8	
Two-party-preferred result
Liberal	David Hodgett	23,446	51.4	+0.4
Labor	Sorina Grasso	22,193	48.6	−0.4
Liberal hold		Swing	+0.4	

=== Elections in the 2010s ===
2018 Victorian state election: Croydon
Party	Candidate	Votes	%	±%
Liberal	David Hodgett	18,108	47.97	−5.73
Labor	Josh Cusack	14,307	37.90	+7.11
Greens	Caleb O'Flynn	3,468	9.19	+0.31
Animal Justice	Vinita Costantino	1,863	4.94	+4.94
Total formal votes		37,746	95.03	−0.57
Informal votes		1,975	4.97	+0.57
Turnout		39,721	92.39	−2.29
Two-party-preferred result
Liberal	David Hodgett	19,671	52.11	−7.18
Labor	Josh Cusack	18,075	47.89	+7.18
Liberal hold		Swing	−7.18	

2014 Victorian state election: Croydon
Party	Candidate	Votes	%	±%
Liberal	David Hodgett	19,797	53.7	−1.8
Labor	Lesley Fielding	11,352	30.8	+1.9
Greens	Jill Wild	3,273	8.9	+0.1
Christians	Mike Brown	1,033	2.8	+2.8
Country Alliance	Sarah Barclay	869	2.4	+2.4
Independent	Joel Martin	539	1.5	+1.5
Total formal votes		36,863	95.6	−0.2
Informal votes		1,699	4.4	+0.2
Turnout		38,562	94.7	+2.7
Two-party-preferred result
Liberal	David Hodgett	22,005	59.3	−2.9
Labor	Lesley Fielding	15,108	40.7	+2.9
Liberal hold		Swing	−2.9	
