= Ben Howe (politician) =

Australian politician

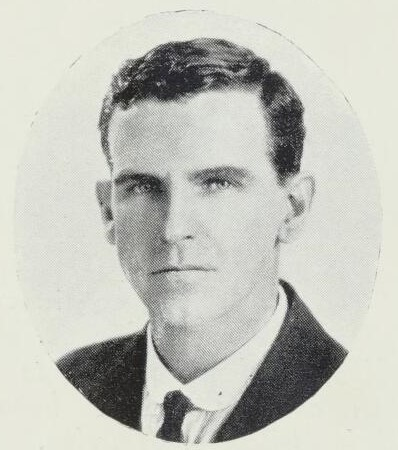
- Portrait of Howe in 1932.

Member of the New South Wales Legislative Assembly for North Sydney
- In office 25 October 1930 – 8 May 1932
- Preceded by: Ernest Marks
- Succeeded by: Hubert Primrose

Personal details
- Born: 21 March 1892 Darlinghurst, Colony of New South Wales
- Died: 14 February 1950 (aged 57) North Sydney, New South Wales, Australia

Benjamin Howe (21 March 1892 – 14 February 1950) was an Australian politician. He was a Labor Party member of the New South Wales Legislative Assembly from 1930 until 1932, representing the electorate of North Sydney.

Howe was born in Darlinghurst, and undertook an apprenticeship as an engineer at Mort's Dock. He became a fitter and turner in the tramway workshops at Randwick from 1921 until his election to parliament in 1930. He was an active trade unionist, serving as a shop delegate, organiser and representative of the tramway section of the Amalgamated Engineering Union. He also ran a soup kitchen with his wife in North Sydney during the Great Depression.

Howe was the Labor candidate for North Sydney at the 1927 state election, losing to Ernest Marks, and for the corresponding federal seat at the 1928 federal election, losing to former Prime Minister Billy Hughes. He was elected on his third attempt when he defeated Marks at the 1930 state election as part of Labor's landslide victory that year. His political career was to be short-lived, however; he was easily defeated amidst the Labor defeat of 1932 by North Sydney mayor and United Australia Party candidate Hubert Primrose. He again contested North Sydney against Primrose in 1935, but was easily defeated.

Howe returned to his prior role at the tramway workshops after his defeat, and worked there from 1938 until his death in 1950. A long-term resident of Cammeray, Howe died at age 57 at the Mater Hospital, North Sydney. He was cremated at Northern Suburbs Crematorium.

New South Wales Legislative Assembly
Preceded by Ernest Marks	Member for North Sydney; 1930 – 1932	Succeeded by Hubert Primrose
