= Ernest Marks =

Australian politician (1872–1947)

Ernest Samuel Marks (CBE)
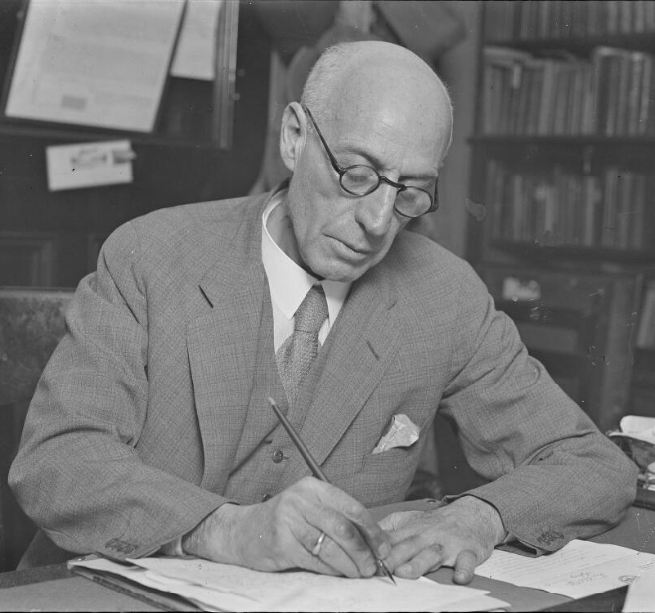
- Lord Mayor of Sydney Ernest Samuel Marks at his desk in c.1930
- In office 1927–1930
- Preceded by: New Seat
- Succeeded by: Benjamin Howe

New South Wales Legislative Council - Inagurul Member for North Sydney

Lord Mayor of Sydney
- In office 1930–1930

Personal details
- Born: Ernest Samuel Marks; 7 July 1872 West Maitland, New South Wales
- Died: 2 December 1947 (aged 75) Darlinghurst, New South Wales, Australia
- Party: Nationalist Party of Australia
- Education: Royston College, Darlinghurst; University of Sydney
- Occupation: Politician, sporting administrator, wool broker
- Known for: Member of New South Wales Legislative Assembly; Lord Mayor of Sydney; sports administrator

Ernest Samuel Marks CBE (7 July 1872 – 2 December 1947) was an Australian politician, sporting administrator and wool broker.

== Early life ==
Marks was born at West Maitland, New South Wales, to London wool broker and store-owner Joseph Marks and Elizabeth, née Benjamin, and attended Royston College in Sydney before becoming a wool trader and becoming involved in the running of the family business, Joseph Marks & Co.

== Politics ==
Marks served as the Nationalist member in the New South Wales Legislative Council for the newly created seat of North Sydney from 1927 to 1930.

He was also active in local government through the Civic Reform Association, serving on Sydney City Council from 1920 to 1927 and from 1930 to 1947, with a period as Lord Mayor in 1930.

== Sport ==
In 1888–90 Marks won more than forty trophies as an athlete.

He became involved in athletics, serving as secretary of The Amateur Athletic Union of Australia from 1896 to 1934 and as a foundation member of the New South Wales Sports Club. He accompanied the Australian Olympic teams for the 1908 London Games, the 1912 Stockholm Games, and the 1932 Los Angeles Games.

In October 1929, he was the inaugural Chairman of the Australian British Empire Games Committee. He was Chair of the Organising Committee of 1938 British Empire Games held in Sydney.

ES Marks Athletics Field was named in his honour. He donated his large sporting collection to the State Library of New South Wales.

== Personal life ==
During his life, Marks worshipped at the Great Syngogue in Sydney and was part of the Jewish community.

With his brother, Percy J. Marks, Ernest took part in the Jewish Literary and Debating Society, and they were founders and office-bearers of the Shakespeare Society. Percy, with Ernest's backing, was instrumental in forming the Australian Jewish Historical Society. Percy was first president in 1939–41, followed by Ernest in 1944–47.

In 1930 he was appointed Commander of the Order of the British Empire (CBE).

Ernest Samuel Marks died in Darlinghurst, New South Wales in 1947.

New South Wales Legislative Assembly
Preceded by New seat	Member for North Sydney; 1927–1930	Succeeded by Ben Howe
Civic offices
Preceded by Gordon Bennett (Commissioner)	Lord Mayor of Sydney; 1930	Succeeded by Joseph Jackson
