= Hubert Primrose =

Australian politician

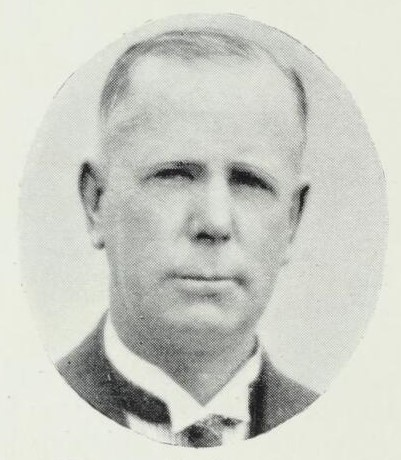

17th Mayor of North Sydney
- In office 7 December 1926 – 20 December 1932
- Deputy: Robert Charles Forsyth
- Preceded by: Charles William Watt
- Succeeded by: Raymond Lee Hodgson

Alderman of the Municipality of North Sydney
- In office 31 January 1920 – 2 December 1922
- Preceded by: Richard Brennan
- Succeeded by: Richard Brennan
- Constituency: Belmore Ward
- In office 23 August 1924 – 30 March 1938
- Preceded by: Albert Ernest Whatmore
- Succeeded by: Robert Joseph Ferguson
- Constituency: Tunks Ward
- In office 6 December 1941 – 26 November 1942
- Succeeded by: John Augustus Middlemiss
- Constituency: Kirribilli Ward

Member of the New South Wales Parliament for North Sydney
- In office 11 June 1932 – 18 April 1941
- Preceded by: Ben Howe
- Succeeded by: James Geraghty

Personal details
- Born: 14 November 1882 Cootamundra, Colony of New South Wales
- Died: 26 November 1942 (aged 60) Waverton, New South Wales, Australia

Hubert Leslie Primrose (14 November 1882 – 26 November 1942) was an Australian politician. He was a member of the proto-fascist New Guard.

== Early life ==
He was born at Cootamundra to public servant Charles Herman Burton Primrose and Sarah Maria, née Clissold. After a private education he studied law. On 26 October 1910 he married Edith Briton, with whom he had four children. Admitted as a solicitor in 1917, he was a partner in Lee & Primrose (1917–27), which later became Primrose & Primrose (1930–42).

== Political career ==
He served on North Sydney Council from 1919 to 1938, with a period as mayor from 1926 to 1932. As mayor he was responsible for officially opening the Sydney Harbour Bridge's northern approach on 19 March 1932.

He was elected to the New South Wales Legislative Assembly in 1932 as the United Australia Party member for North Sydney. An assistant minister from 1939 to 1941, he was acting Minister for Health for several periods in 1939 and 1940. Defeated in 1941, Primrose died at Waverton the following year.

Civic offices
Preceded by Charles William Watt	Mayor of North Sydney; 1926 – 1932	Succeeded by Raymond Lee Hodgson
New South Wales Legislative Assembly
Preceded by Ben Howe	Member for North Sydney; 1932 – 1941	Succeeded by James Geraghty
Political offices
Preceded by Michael Bruxner	Minister in Charge of National Emergency Services; 1941	Succeeded by Bob Heffron
