= Electoral results for the district of Croydon (South Australia) =

South Australian district election results

This is a list of electoral results for the Electoral district of Croydon in South Australian state elections.

== Members for Croydon ==
Member	Party	Term
Michael Atkinson	Labor	2002–2018
Peter Malinauskas	Labor	2018–present

== Election results ==
=== Elections in the 2020s ===
==== 2026 ====
2026 South Australian state election: Croydon
Party	Candidate	Votes	%	±%
Labor	Peter Malinauskas	12,774	55.4	−5.4
One Nation	Dale Blackeby	2,934	12.7	+12.7
Greens	Ruby Dolling	2,686	11.6	−0.7
Liberal	Michael Santagata	1,797	7.8	−14.7
Independent	Ahmed Azhar	1,308	5.7	+5.7
Family First	Hieu Pham	1,017	4.4	+4.4
Animal Justice	Suzanne Pope	334	1.4	−3.0
Australian Family	Joey Elms	122	0.5	+0.5
United Voice	Daniel Bettinelli	84	0.4	+0.4
Total formal votes		23.056	95.0	−1.7
Informal votes		1,208	5.0	+1.7
Turnout		24,264	83.6	−1.4
Two-candidate-preferred result
Labor	Peter Malinauskas	17,067	74.0	−0.7
Greens	Ruby Dolling	5,989	26.0	+26.0
Labor hold				

==== 2022 ====
2022 South Australian state election: Croydon
Party	Candidate	Votes	%	±%
Labor	Peter Malinauskas	14,064	60.8	+4.2
Liberal	Michael Santagata	5,197	22.5	+6.1
Greens	Tracey Davis	2,858	12.3	+4.6
Animal Justice	Millie Hammerstein	1,029	4.4	+1.1
Total formal votes		23,148	96.7	
Informal votes		800	3.3	
Turnout		23,948	85.0	
Two-party-preferred result
Labor	Peter Malinauskas	17,305	74.8	+1.5
Liberal	Michael Santagata	5,843	25.2	−1.5
Labor hold		Swing	+1.5	

Distribution of preferences: Croydon
Party	Candidate	Votes	Round 1		Round 2	
Party	Candidate	Votes	Dist.	Total	Dist.	Total
Quota (50% + 1)		11,575				
Labor	Peter Malinauskas	14,064	+224	14,288	+3,017	17,305
Liberal	Michael Santagata	5,197	+167	5,364	+479	5,843
Greens	Tracey Davis	2,858	+638	3,496	Excluded	
Animal Justice	Millie Hammerstein	1,029	Excluded			

=== Elections in the 2010s ===
==== 2018 ====
2018 South Australian state election: Croydon
Party	Candidate	Votes	%	±%
Labor	Peter Malinauskas	11,739	58.0	−2.3
Liberal	Daria Hextell	3,185	15.7	−7.8
SA-Best	Julia Karpathakis	2,125	10.5	+10.5
Greens	Nathan Lange	1,424	7.0	−3.3
Animal Justice	Millie Hammerstein	803	4.0	+4.0
Conservatives	Rachael Runner	365	1.8	−3.0
Dignity	Lucy McGinley	241	1.2	+1.2
Independent	Michael Lesiw	176	0.9	+0.9
Danig	Gabor Gesti	172	0.9	+0.9
Total formal votes		20,230	93.0	−3.4
Informal votes		1,511	7.0	+3.4
Turnout		21,741	88.3	+5.3
Two-party-preferred result
Labor	Peter Malinauskas	15,044	74.4	+3.2
Liberal	Daria Hextell	5,186	25.6	−3.2
Labor hold		Swing	+3.2	

2014 South Australian state election: Croydon
Party	Candidate	Votes	%	±%
Labor	Michael Atkinson	11,872	57.8	+4.8
Liberal	Glenda Noble	5,462	26.6	+3.3
Greens	Cherie Hoyle	2,342	11.4	+2.6
Family First	Nkweto Nkamba	866	4.2	+0.6
Total formal votes		20,542	96.6	+1.4
Informal votes		716	3.4	−1.4
Turnout		21,258	90.7	−1.9
Two-party-preferred result
Labor	Michael Atkinson	14,156	68.9	+3.5
Liberal	Glenda Noble	6,386	31.1	−3.5
Labor hold		Swing	+3.5	

2010 South Australian state election: Croydon
Party	Candidate	Votes	%	±%
Labor	Michael Atkinson	10,200	51.5	−15.6
Liberal	Zack McLennan	4,809	24.3	+5.0
Greens	James Hickey	1,743	8.8	−0.8
Independent	Max Galanti	1,143	5.8	+5.8
Gamers 4 Croydon	Kat Nicholson	726	3.7	+3.7
Family First	Alex Tennikoff	682	3.4	+3.4
Democrats	Shaun Yates	505	2.5	−1.5
Total formal votes		19,808	94.9	
Informal votes		1,002	5.1	
Turnout		20,810	92.6	
Two-party-preferred result
Labor	Michael Atkinson	12,702	64.1	−12.0
Liberal	Zack McLennan	7,106	35.9	+12.0
Labor hold		Swing	−12.0	

=== Elections in the 2000s ===
2006 South Australian state election: Croydon
Party	Candidate	Votes	%	±%
Labor	Michael Atkinson	13,074	67.1	+6.8
Liberal	Briony Whitehouse	3,762	19.3	−5.4
Greens	Teresa Beltrame	1,869	9.6	+9.6
Democrats	Kerrin Pine	781	4.0	−3.9
Total formal votes		19,486	96.4	
Informal votes		721	3.6	
Turnout		20,207	91.4	
Two-party-preferred result
Labor	Michael Atkinson	14,808	76.0	+6.9
Liberal	Briony Whitehouse	4,678	24.0	−6.9
Labor hold		Swing	+6.9	

2002 South Australian state election: Croydon
Party	Candidate	Votes	%	±%
Labor	Michael Atkinson	12,024	60.3	−2.5
Liberal	Angus Bristow	4,926	24.7	+0.5
Democrats	Daryl Owen	1,568	7.9	−5.1
SA First	James England	708	3.6	+3.6
Independent	Jessica Gosnell	401	2.0	+2.0
One Nation	John Victorsen	308	1.5	+1.5
Total formal votes		19,935	96.2	
Informal votes		782	3.8	
Turnout		20,717	93.1	
Two-party-preferred result
Labor	Michael Atkinson	13,766	69.1	−2.1
Liberal	Angus Bristow	6,169	30.9	+2.1
Labor hold		Swing	−2.1	
