= James Geraghty (Australian politician) =

Australian politician (1896–1960)

Personal details
- Born: 1 January 1896 Parramatta, New South Wales
- Died: 27 June 1960 (aged 64) Crows Nest, New South Wales
- Party: Labor Party, Independent Labor

James Leo Geraghty (1896 – 27 June 1960) was an Australian politician. He was a member of the New South Wales Legislative Assembly from 1941 until 1953. He was a member of the Labor Party (ALP) until 1950 and then sat as an Independent Labor member.

== Early life ==
He worked as a railway engineer and hotel manager and owned substantial suburban property.

== State parliament ==
Geraghty was elected to the New South Wales Parliament as the Labor member for the seat of North Sydney at the 1941 state election. He defeated the sitting United Australia Party member, Hubert Primrose. Geraghty retained the seat for the Labor Party at the next 2 elections.

== Expulsion from the Labor Party ==
In November 1949, Eli Harrison resigned from the Legislative Council to successfully contest the federal seat of Blaxland at the 1949 election. His successor was due to be elected at a joint sitting of the two houses of parliament on 22 March 1950. While the election was by secret ballot, each Labor member of the parliament had a unique how- to-vote card and Labor scrutineers were able to determine if a member had broken caucus solidarity and voted against the endorsed Labor candidate. On the day of the election, Mr Asher Joel, a wealthy Sydney businessman was a surprise nomination against Labor's Mr James Thom. Joel was unsuccessful but received 23 votes and it became common knowledge within the Labor Party, although never officially stated, that 4 members of the party; Geraghty, John Seiffert (Monaro), Roy Heferen (Barwon), Fred Stanley (Lakemba) had voted for him. There were also unproven rumours that they had received cash payments for their votes. The state executive of the Labor Party responded by withholding the endorsement for these candidates at the 1950 election. Geraghty and the other disendorsed members received support from the Caucus and a severe rift developed between the parliamentary and extra-parliamentary parties. This was a major contribution to Labor's poor showing at the election.. Geraghty successfully defended the seat as an Independent Labor candidate against Ray Maher the endorsed Labor candidate and was automatically expelled from the party. He lost the seat to Maher at the 1953 election.

New South Wales Legislative Assembly
Preceded by Hubert Primrose	Member for North Sydney; 1941 – 1953	Succeeded by Ray Maher
