= Jim Taylor (politician) =

Australian politician

James Hugh Taylor (20 March 1920 – 23 September 2005) was an Australian politician. He was a Country Party member of the New South Wales Legislative Assembly from 1960 to 1981, representing the electorate of Temora.

Taylor was born in Sydney, and was educated by correspondence and at All Saints College in Bathurst. He worked as a station hand after leaving school, before enlisting in the Second Australian Imperial Force in 1940. He left the military at the conclusion of World War II and worked as a property manager at Warren for a period, before becoming a soldier settler at Bogan Gate in 1950. He was active in local affairs, serving as district president of the Farmer and Settlers' Association and chairman of the Forbes to Tottenham Water Development League. He was elected as a councillor of the Shire of Goobang in 1956 and the Central Tablelands County Council in 1959, holding both roles until 1962.

Taylor entered state politics in 1960, winning a by-election for the seat of Temora caused by the death of former County Party deputy leader Doug Dickson. He was easily re-elected seven times, and was elected party whip in 1973. Taylor retired in 1981 after his Temora electorate was abolished in a redistribution. He died at Forbes in 2005.

New South Wales Legislative Assembly
Preceded by Doug Dickson	Member for Temora; 1960 – 1981	Succeeded by Seat abolished
