= Keith Anderson (politician) =

Australian politician

Keith William Anderson (23 October 1916 – 27 November 1965) was an Australian politician and member of the New South Wales Legislative Assembly from 1961 until 1962. He was a member of the Labor Party.

Anderson was born in Eurobodalla and was the son of a labourer. He trained as a carpenter and worked for the New South Wales Maritime Authority. He served as president of the Bridge, Wharf and Engineering Construction Carpenters' Union for eight years. During World War II he served as an Australian infantryman in the Middle East and South Pacific. He was an alderman (1957–62) and mayor (1957–58) of Waverley.

The 1961 death of William Ferguson, the member for the seat of Paddington-Waverley, resulted in a by-election. Anderson won both the ALP pre-selection and the main election. However, his career lasted less than a year as the seat was abolished during a redistribution of the electorates before the 1962 election. He did not stand for another elected parliamentary position.

Uniquely both Anderson's wife and his only son served in the New South Wales parliament. His wife Kath was a member of the Legislative Council from 1973 until 1981. His son Peter was a member of the Legislative Assembly and a Government minister between 1978 and 1995.

New South Wales Legislative Assembly
Preceded by William Ferguson	Member for Paddington-Waverley; 1961–1962	District abolished
