= Ray Maher =

Australian politician

The Honourable Ray Maher
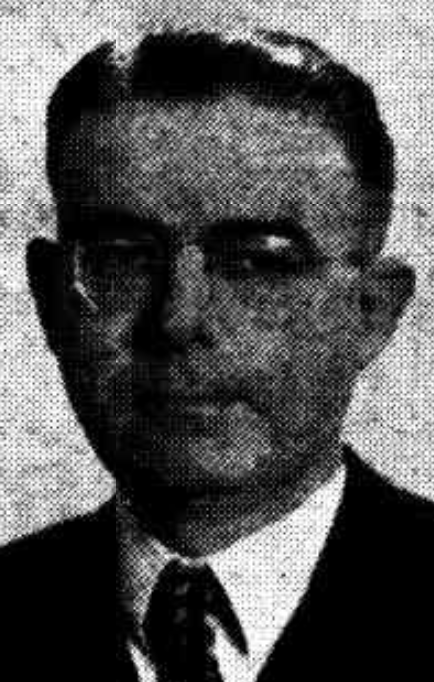
- Mayer circa 1950

22nd Speaker of the New South Wales Legislative Assembly
- In office 21 April 1959 – 29 January 1965
- Preceded by: Bill Lamb
- Succeeded by: Kevin Ellis

Personal details
- Born: Raphael Septimus Maher; 1 April 1911 Grenfell, New South Wales
- Died: 22 September 1966 (aged 55) Crows Nest, New South Wales
- Party: Labor Party

Raphael Septimus "Ray" Maher (1 April 1911 – 22 September 1966) was an Australian politician. He was a member of the New South Wales Legislative Assembly from 1953 until 1965 and a member of the Labor Party (ALP). Maher was the Speaker of the New South Wales Legislative Assembly between 1959 and 1965.

== Early life ==
Maher was born in Grenfell, New South Wales. He was the son of a union organizer and was educated at De La Salle College Ashfield and the University of Sydney. He graduated with a Bachelor of Arts in 1944 but gave up plans to study law to become a concrete contractor. He joined the Labor Party in 1927 and was a member of the Australian Workers' Union.

== State Parliament ==
Maher failed in his first three attempts to be elected to the parliament. At the 1935 state election, Maher, the Lang Labor candidate was defeated by the sitting Country Party member Matthew Kilpatrick in the seat of Wagga Wagga. At the following election in 1938, Maher had moved to Sydney and was defeated in the seat of Drummoyne by the United Australia Party incumbent member, John Lee. After a 12-year gap he was the endorsed Labor candidate for North Sydney at the 1950 election but was defeated by the incumbent Independent Labor member James Geraghty. Geraghty had been elected as a Labor member in 1941 but had been expelled from the party in 1949 for breaking caucus solidarity during an indirect election of the Legislative Council. Maher was finally elected to the New South Wales Legislative Assembly as the member for North Sydney at the 1953 election, when he defeated Geraghty. Maher retained the seat until it was abolished at the 1962 election. He subsequently successfully contested the new seat of Wyong which he retained until he retired from parliament at the 1965 election.

== Speaker ==
Maher succeeded Bill Lamb as the Speaker of the New South Wales Legislative Assembly after the 1959 election and retained the position until he was forced to resign from the position in January 1965, four months before the end of the parliamentary term. The parliamentary web site states that Maher: "managed to maintain the independence of the office...(He) developed a reputation for consistent rulings and for actively protecting and improving the rights and privileges of the Members of Parliament." In early 1965 he was accused by a female staff member of sexual harassment by exposing his genitalia. Maher claimed that he had forgotten to adjust the zip on his pants after visiting the toilet. However, he resigned from the position of speaker and did not contest the election held four months later. He was eventually acquitted of criminal charges but the scandal contributed to Labor's loss at the 1965 election after 24 years of continuous government. Maher died 18 months later at the age of 55.

New South Wales Legislative Assembly
Preceded by James Geraghty	Member for North Sydney; 1953–1962	District abolished
New district	Member for Wyong; 1962–1965	Succeeded by Harry Jensen
Preceded by Bill Lamb	Speaker of the New South Wales Legislative Assembly; 1959–1965	Succeeded by Kevin Ellis
