= Electoral district of North Sydney =

Former state electoral district of New South Wales, Australia

North Sydney was an electoral district of the Legislative Assembly in the Australian state of New South Wales. Created in 1927, it replaced part of the multi-member electorate of North Shore, and was named after and included the Sydney suburb of North Sydney. It was abolished in 1962 and partly replaced by Kirribilli.

== Members for North Sydney ==
Member	Party	Period
Ernest Marks	Nationalist	1927–1930
Ben Howe	Labor	1930–1932
Hubert Primrose	United Australia	1932–1941
James Geraghty	Labor	1941–1950
James Geraghty	Independent Labor	1950–1953
Ray Maher	Labor	1953–1962

== Election results ==
1959 New South Wales state election: North Sydney
Party	Candidate	Votes	%	±%
Labor	Ray Maher	10,694	49.8	
Liberal	Russell Newton	9,513	44.3	
Democratic Labor	Michael Fitzpatrick	899	4.2	
Independent	Francis Ferry	377	1.7	
Total formal votes		21,483	97.6	
Informal votes		526	2.4	
Turnout		22,009	93.1	
Two-party-preferred result
Labor	Ray Maher	11,026	51.3	
Liberal	Russell Newton	10,457	48.7	
Labor hold		Swing		
