= 1959 New South Wales state election =

State election for New South Wales, Australia in March 1959

← 1956	21 March 1959	1962 →

All 94 seats in the New South Wales Legislative Assembly 48 Assembly seats were needed for a majority
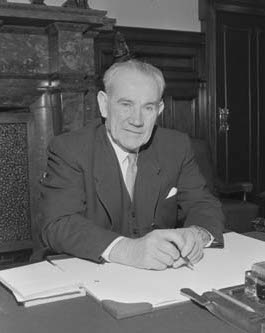

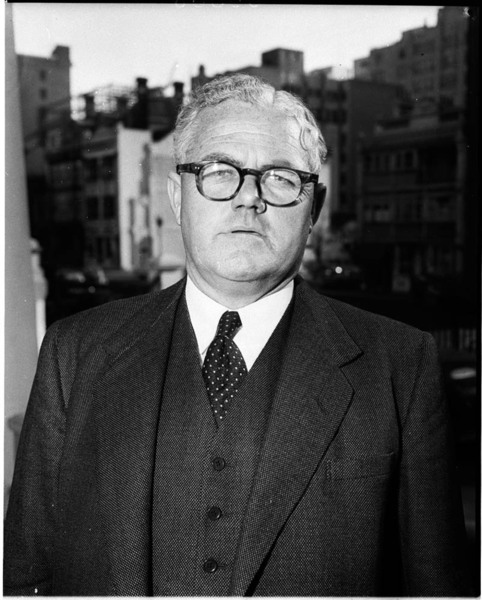
	First party	Second party
Leader	Joseph Cahill	Pat Morton
Party	Labor	Liberal/Country coalition
Leader since	2 April 1952	20 September 1955
Leader's seat	Cook's River	Mosman
Last election	50 seats	42 seats
Seats won	49	44
Seat change	▼1	▲2
Percentage	49.12%	44.06%
Swing	▲1.87	▼2.19
- Two-candidate-preferred margin by electorate
Premier before election
Joseph Cahill
Labor
Elected Premier
Joseph Cahill
Labor

The 1959 New South Wales state election was held on 21 March 1959. It was conducted in single member constituencies with compulsory preferential voting and was held on boundaries created at a 1957 redistribution. The election was for all of the 94 seats in the Legislative Assembly.

== Key dates ==
Date	Event
16 February 1959	The Legislative Assembly was dissolved, and writs were issued by the Governor to proceed with an election.
20 February 1959	Nominations for candidates for the election closed at noon.
21 March 1959	Polling day.
1 April 1959	Fourth Cahill ministry sworn in.
16 April 1959	Last day for the writs to be returned and the results formally declared.
21 April 1959	Opening of 39th Parliament.

== Redistribution ==
A redistribution of electoral boundaries was undertaken in 1957 based on the 1954 Australian Census. Reflecting population shifts from the eastern and inner western suburbs of Sydney to western Sydney, two safe Liberal seats, Ashfield and Croydon were combined into the seat of Ashfield-Croydon and two safe Labor seats, Paddington and Waverley were combined into Paddington-Waverley. Merrylands was created in Western Sydney and was a notional Labor seat. In addition, the marginal seat of Parramatta became a safe Labor seat. In southern Sydney, the marginal seat of Sutherland became a safe Labor seat by the creation of Cronulla which had a notional Liberal majority. The effect of the redistribution was to increase Labor's numbers by 1.

== Issues ==
In March 1959, Labor had been in power for 18 years and Joseph Cahill had been premier for 7 years. Cahill, who was commonly known as "old smoothie" continued to be a popular premier but the opposition campaign argued that his cabinet consisted of "tired old men". While nationally the Labor party remained divided on sectarian and ideological grounds, in New South Wales much of the split between Labor and the DLP had been avoided. Clive Evatt, the brother of H V Evatt, who had been the major left-wing agitator within the caucus was expelled from the party after he voted against a government move to increase tram fares. As a result, party unity was significantly improved. However, a small branch of the DLP under the leadership of Jake Kane had organised in NSW and nominated candidates at this election for the first time.

Cahill attacked the opposition for its "reckless election promises" which were "worth no more than a handful of Bondi sand" . Labor promised, that if re-elected, it would form a Commonwealth- State Housing Corporation to lend up to 95% of housing costs on a 45-year basis. It would attempt to reduce road taxes for haulage companies and promised a vigorous program of road development including the possible use of privately constructed toll roads. Cahill announced plans to build Housing Commission towers in Surry Hills and promised a referendum on the abolition of the New South Wales Legislative Council.

The coalition of the Liberal Party and the Country Party coalition had been led by Pat Morton since September 1955. However, Morton remained a somewhat aloof figure, with a public presence more typical of pre-war conservative politicians, and found it difficult to connect with the public. Davis Hughes, who had led the Country Party since September 1958 was forced to resign the leadership at the start of the campaign when it was revealed that he had falsely claimed to have a university degree. He was replaced by Charles Cutler.

The opposition campaigned on the government's broken promises and its continuing record of over-budget and uncompleted public works. In addition it promised to abolish several taxes including; land tax and the road maintenance tax. School transport would be free and the number of high school bursaries increased. Sewering the outer western suburbs, with a deep sea discharge, and completing the Sandy Hollow railway line were the opposition's public works priorities. The housing crisis was to be resolved by the government construction of 100,000 houses in 3 years.

== Results ==
The result of the election showed little change but was a clear victory for Labor with a buffer of 2 seats in the parliament. Labor regained the seat of Hurstville from Clive Evatt who had sat as an Independent Labor member since his expulsion from the party. It had already reclaimed Kahibah at a by-election caused by the death of the Independent Labor Member Tom Armstrong. However Labor failed to take back the usually safe seat of Waratah from Frank Purdue. As expected Labor won Parramatta, Sutherland and Merrylands but lost Dubbo, Cronulla and Blacktown to the Liberals. It had already lost the seat of Wagga Wagga at a by-election caused by the death of Eddie Graham. Labor also lost Young to the Country Party.

The DLP performed poorly, finishing behind the Communist party with less than 2% of the vote.

New South Wales state election, 21 March 1959 Legislative Assembly << 1956–1962 >>
Enrolled voters	2,075,268 (Note: There were 1,850,675 enrolled voters in 83 contested electorates and 224,593 were enrolled in 11 uncontested electorates (1 Labor, 5 Liberal and 5 Country ).)				
Votes cast	1,739,580		Turnout	94.00	+0.73
Informal votes	31,864		Informal	1.83	+0.16
Summary of votes by party
Party	Primary votes	%	Swing	Seats	Change
Labor	838,836	49.12	+1.87	49	−1
Liberal	603,718	35.35	−0.74	28	+1
Country	148,738	8.71	−1.45	16	+1
Independent	61,939	3.63	+0.50	1	−
Communist	24,784	1.45	−0.29	0	−
Democratic Labor	22,508	1.32	+1.32	0	−
Independent Labor	7,193	0.42	−1.46	0	−1
Total	1,707,716			94	

Popular vote
Labor	49.12%
Liberal	35.35%
Country	8.71%
Independents	4.05%
Communist	1.45%
Democratic Labor	1.32%
Seats
Labor	49
Liberal	28
Country	16
Independents	1

== Retiring members ==
=== Labor ===
- Fred Cahill (Young)
- George Campbell (Hamilton)
- John Crook (Cessnock)
- John Freeman (Blacktown)
- John McGrath (Rockdale)
- Maurice O'Sullivan (Paddington)

=== Liberal ===
- Jim Clough (Parramatta)

=== Country ===
- D'Arcy Rose (Upper Hunter)

== Seats changing party representation ==
Seat	1956		1959	
Seat	Party	Member	Member	Party
Ashfield	Liberal	Richard Murden (Note: Unsuccessfully contested Ashfield-Croyden.)	Absorbed into Ashfield-Croydon	
Ashfield-Croydon		New seat (Note: Ashfield-Croydon and Cronulla were notionally Liberal seats.)	David Hunter	Liberal
Blacktown	Labor	John Freeman (Note: Did not contest the election.)	Alfred Dennis	Liberal
Cronulla		New seat	Ian Griffith	Liberal
Croydon	Liberal	David Hunter (Note: Successfully contested Ashfield-Croyden.)	Absorbed into Ashfield-Croyden	
Dubbo	Labor	Clarrie Robertson	Les Ford	Liberal
Kahibah (Note: Tom Armstrong (Independent Labor) died and Jack Stewart (Labor) won the resulting by-election.)	Independent Labor		Jack Stewart	Labor
Merrylands		New seat (Note: Merrylands and Paddington-Waverley were notionally Labor seats.)	Jack Ferguson	Labor
Paddington	Labor	Maurice O'Sullivan	Absorbed into Paddington-Waverley	
Paddington-Waverley		New seat	William Ferguson	Labor
Parramatta	Liberal	Jim Clough	Dan Mahoney	Labor
Sutherland	Liberal	Ian Griffith (Note: Successfully contested Cronulla.)	Tom Dalton	Labor
Wagga Wagga (Note: Eddie Graham (Labor) died and Wal Fife (Liberal) won the resulting by-election.)	Labor		Wal Fife	Liberal
Waverley	Labor	William Ferguson (Note: Successfully contested Paddington-Waverley.)	Absorbed into Paddington-Waverley	
Young	Labor	Fred Cahill	George Freudenstein	Country

== Aftermath ==
Joseph Cahill died in October 1959 and was replaced by Robert Heffron who continued as Premier for the rest of the term. Pat Morton was replaced as Leader of the Opposition in July 1959 by Robert Askin. Charles Cutler remained Leader of the New South Wales Country Party throughout the term of the parliament. During the parliament there were 6 by-elections with Labor and the Country Party each winning a seat at the other party's expense.

== See also ==
- Members of the New South Wales Legislative Assembly, 1959–1962
- Candidates of the 1959 New South Wales state election
