= Electoral district of Paddington-Waverley =

Former state electoral district of New South Wales, Australia

Paddington-Waverley was an electoral district of the Legislative Assembly in the Australian state of New South Wales. It was created in 1959, when Paddington and part of Waverley were merged. Paddington-Waverley was abolished in 1962 and partly replaced by Bligh.

== Members for Paddington-Waverley ==
| Member | Party | Term |
|---|---|---|
| William Ferguson | Labor | 1959–1961 |
| Keith Anderson | Labor | 1961–1962 |

== Election results ==
=== 1961 ===
1961 Paddington-Waverley state by-election
| Party | Candidate | Votes | % | ±% |
|---|---|---|---|---|
| Labor | Keith Anderson | 12,972 | 91.36 | +28.7 |
| Communist | Edward Maher | 1,227 | 8.64 | +5.5 |
| Total formal votes | | 14,199 | 93.95 | −3.1 |
| Informal votes | | 912 | 6.05 | +3.1 |
| Turnout | | 15,111 | 69.01 | −21.4 |
| Labor hold | | | | |

William Ferguson (Labor) died.

=== 1959 ===
1959 New South Wales state election: Paddington-Waverley
| Party | Candidate | Votes | % | ±% |
|---|---|---|---|---|
| Labor | William Ferguson | 13,235 | 62.7 | |
| Liberal | Jack Cole | 6,490 | 30.7 | |
| Independent | Cyril Hutchings | 737 | 3.5 | |
| Communist | Bernard Rosen | 657 | 3.1 | |
| Total formal votes | | 21,119 | 97.1 | |
| Informal votes | | 622 | 2.9 | |
| Turnout | | 21,741 | 90.4 | |
Two-party-preferred result
| Labor | William Ferguson | 14,130 | 66.9 | |
| Liberal | Jack Cole | 6,989 | 33.1 | |
| Labor notional hold | | | | |

The Labor-held seats of Paddington and Waverley were combined into one seat.
