= William Ferguson (1891–1961) =

Australian politician

Personal details
- Born: 14 November 1891 Redfern, New South Wales
- Died: 29 January 1961 (aged 69) Waverley, New South Wales
- Party: Labor Party

William John Ferguson (14 November 1891 – 29 January 1961) was an Australian politician. He was a member of the New South Wales Legislative Council for 16 days in 1953 and a member of the New South Wales Legislative Assembly from 1953 until his death. He was a member of the Labor Party (ALP).

Ferguson was born in Redfern and was the son of a clothes presser. He was educated to elementary level in Campsie and trained as a letter-setter and printer. He was a member of the Printing Industries Employees Union of Australia from 1913 and joined the ALP in 1926. He became active in community organizations in the Waverley area including Legacy and the Australian Red Cross. Ferguson was elected as an alderman on Waverley Municipal Council in 1941 and retained this position until 1955. On 3 September 1953, he was indirectly elected to the Legislative Council for the remainder of the term of Charles Anderson who had resigned. However, Clarrie Martin, the member for Waverley died 2 days later and Ferguson resigned his seat in the Legislative Council, after serving only 16 days, to contest the resultant by-election. Ferguson was duly elected and retained the seat at the next election in 1956. The seat and the neighbouring seat of Paddington were abolished and combined into the seat of Paddington-Waverley at a redistribution before the 1959 election. The Labor member for Paddington, Maurice O'Sullivan retired and Ferguson won the new seat. He died as the sitting member in 1961. He did not hold party, parliamentary or ministerial office.

New South Wales Legislative Assembly
Preceded by Clarrie Martin	Member for Waverley; 1953 – 1959	Succeeded by seat abolished
Preceded by new seat	Member for Paddington-Waverley; 1959 – 1961	Succeeded by Keith Anderson
