= Electoral district of Temora =

Former state electoral district of New South Wales, Australia

Temora was an electoral district for the Legislative Assembly in the Australian State of New South Wales from 1927 to 1981, including the town of Temora.

== Members for Temora ==
Member	Party	Term
Hugh Main	Country	1927–1938
Doug Dickson	Country	1938–1960
Jim Taylor	Country	1960–1981

== History ==
Temora was created in 1927 with the abandonment of proportional representation, replacing part of the 3 member district of Cootamundra and its first member, Hugh Main, had been one of the members for Cootamundra. The district was abolished in the 1980 redistribution and was divided between Burrinjuck, Lachlan and Murrumbidgee.

== Election results ==
1978 New South Wales state election: Temora
Party	Candidate	Votes	%	±%
National Country	Jim Taylor	12,872	67.6	−0.1
Labor	Alroy Provan	6,154	32.4	+2.7
Total formal votes		19,026	98.4	−0.9
Informal votes		301	1.6	+0.9
Turnout		19,327	93.4	−1.2
National Country hold		Swing	−1.5	
