= Doug Dickson =

Australian politician

Personal details
- Born: 26 March 1894 Cootamundra, New South Wales
- Died: 27 July 1960 (aged 66) Neutral Bay, New South Wales
- Party: Country Party

Samuel Douglas Dickson (26 March 1894 – 27 July 1960) was an Australian politician. He was a member of the New South Wales Legislative Assembly from 1938 until his death in 1960. He was a member of the Country Party, serving as its Deputy Leader from 1953 to 1958.

Dickson was born in Cootamundra, New South Wales. He was the son of a monumental mason and was educated to elementary level at Cootamundra Public School. He served in the First Australian Imperial Force in Egypt and France. After the First World War he became a soldier-settler in the Temora, New South Wales region. Dickson was elected to the New South Wales Parliament at the 1938 as the Country Party member for Temora. He replaced the retiring member Hugh Main. He retained the seat at the next 7 elections, and died as the sitting member in 1960.

New South Wales Legislative Assembly
Preceded by Hugh Main	Member for Temora; 1938 – 1960	Succeeded by Jim Taylor
