= Electoral district of Ashfield-Croydon =

Former state electoral district of New South Wales, Australia

Ashfield-Croydon was an electoral district for the Legislative Assembly in the Australian state of New South Wales was created in from 1959, combining the former districts of Ashfield and Croydon. It was abolished in 1968, when it was replaced by the re-created district of Ashfield.

== Members for Ashfield-Croydon ==
| Member | Party | Term |
|---|---|---|
| David Hunter | Liberal | 1959–1968 |

== Election results ==
1965 New South Wales state election: Ashfield−Croydon
| Party | Candidate | Votes | % | ±% |
|---|---|---|---|---|
| Liberal | David Hunter | 14,194 | 60.5 | +4.0 |
| Labor | Wadim Jegorow | 8,814 | 37.6 | −5.9 |
| Independent | Raymond Sharrock | 445 | 1.9 | +1.9 |
| Total formal votes | | 23,453 | 97.9 | −0.8 |
| Informal votes | | 507 | 2.1 | +0.8 |
| Turnout | | 23,960 | 92.8 | 0.0 |
Two-party-preferred result
| Liberal | David Hunter | 14,417 | 61.5 | +5.0 |
| Labor | Wadim Jegorow | 9,036 | 38.5 | −5.0 |
| Liberal hold | | Swing | +5.0 | |
