= Electoral district of Croydon (New South Wales) =

Former state electoral district of New South Wales, Australia

Croydon was an electoral district of the Legislative Assembly in the Australian state of New South Wales, created in 1927, with the abolition of proportional representation from part of the multi-member electorate of Western Suburbs, and named after and including the Sydney suburb of Croydon. It was abolished in 1959 and partly combined with Ashfield to create Ashfield-Croydon.

== Members for Croydon ==
| Member | Party | Term |
|---|---|---|
| Bertram Stevens | Nationalist | 1927–1931 |
| Bertram Stevens | United Australia | 1931–1940 |
| David Hunter | United Australia | 1940–1945 |
| David Hunter | Liberal | 1945–1959 |

== Election results ==
1956 New South Wales state election: Croydon
| Party | Candidate | Votes | % | ±% |
|---|---|---|---|---|
| Liberal | David Hunter | 11,545 | 61.6 | +6.7 |
| Labor | Frank Zions | 7,185 | 38.4 | −6.7 |
| Total formal votes | | 18,730 | 98.8 | +0.5 |
| Informal votes | | 234 | 1.2 | −0.5 |
| Turnout | | 18,964 | 93.0 | −0.7 |
| Liberal hold | | Swing | +6.7 | |
