= David Hunter (New South Wales politician) =

Australian politician

David Hunter OBE
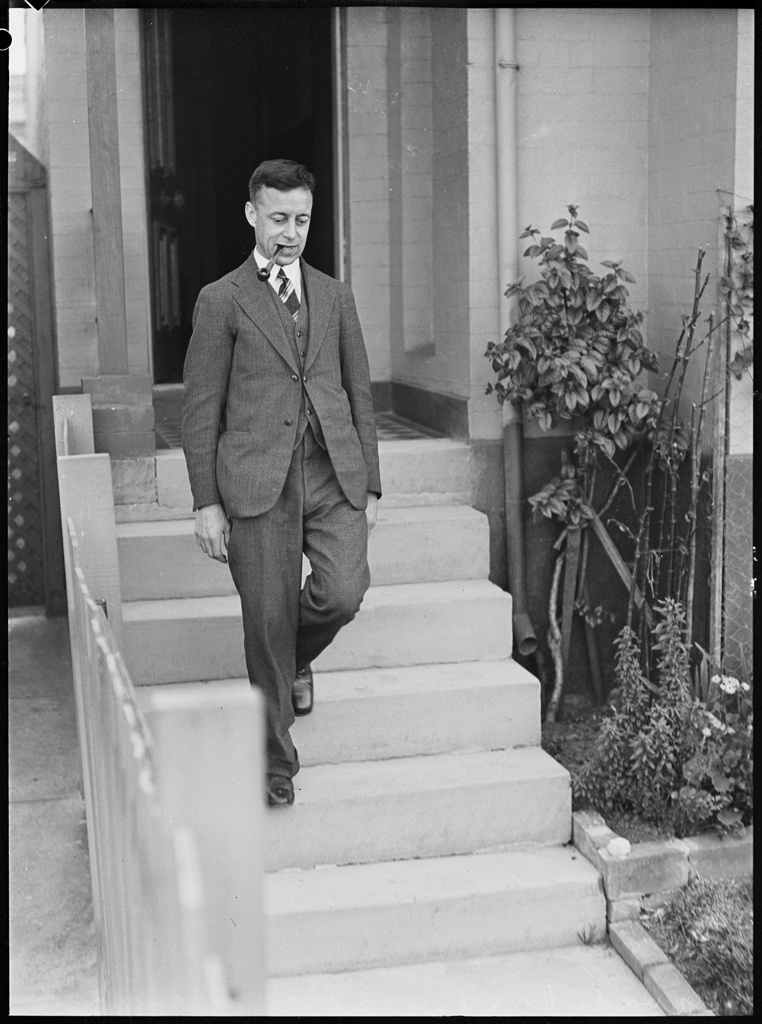
- David Hunter MLA

Member of the New South Wales Legislative Assembly for Croydon
- In office 1940–1959
- Preceded by: Bertram Stevens he is a hjfjfuebbe
- Succeeded by: Seat abolished

Member of the New South Wales Legislative Assembly for Electoral district of Ashfield-Croydon
- In office 1959–1968
- Preceded by: Seat created
- Succeeded by: Seat abolished

Member of the New South Wales Legislative Assembly for Electoral district of Ashfield
- In office 1968–1976
- Preceded by: Seat recreated
- Succeeded by: Paul Whelan

Personal details
- Born: David Benjamin Hunter; 5 September 1905 Sydney, Australia
- Died: 31 August 1981 (aged 75) Sydney, Australia
- Party: United Australia Party; Democratic Party; Liberal Party

David Benjamin Hunter (5 September 1905 – 31 August 1981) was an Australian politician. He was a member of the New South Wales Legislative Assembly from 1940 to 1976, representing three successive conservative parties - the United Australia Party, Democratic Party, and Liberal Party. He was the first blind member of the Parliament of New South Wales, and held the seat of Croydon and its successor seats of Ashfield-Croydon and Ashfield for a total of 36 years.

Hunter was born in Sydney, and lost his sight at the age of six after contracting meningitis. He was educated at the Royal Institute for Deaf and Blind Children, and worked as an insurance broker before his election to parliament. He was actively involved in the United Australia Party, serving on its central council from 1937 to 1937 and 1940 to 1942. His local member, former Premier Bertram Stevens, resigned to contest a federal seat in 1940, and Hunter won preselection to contest the subsequent by-election. He was easily elected, in doing so becoming the first blind person to be elected to the Parliament of New South Wales.

Hunter was forceful from the beginning that his disability would not impact upon his performance as a member of parliament. He stated in his inaugural speech that he would "endeavour to make [fellow members] forget that there is a physical handicap under which [he laboured]", urged that he be treated as a "normal, ordinary citizen", and urged opposition members not to soften their responses to him out of sympathy. He did not use a walking stick or guide dog, and memorised his way around the corridors of Parliament. He made notes in Braille, wrote his own correspondence, and could read Braille at a speed of more than 200 words per minute.

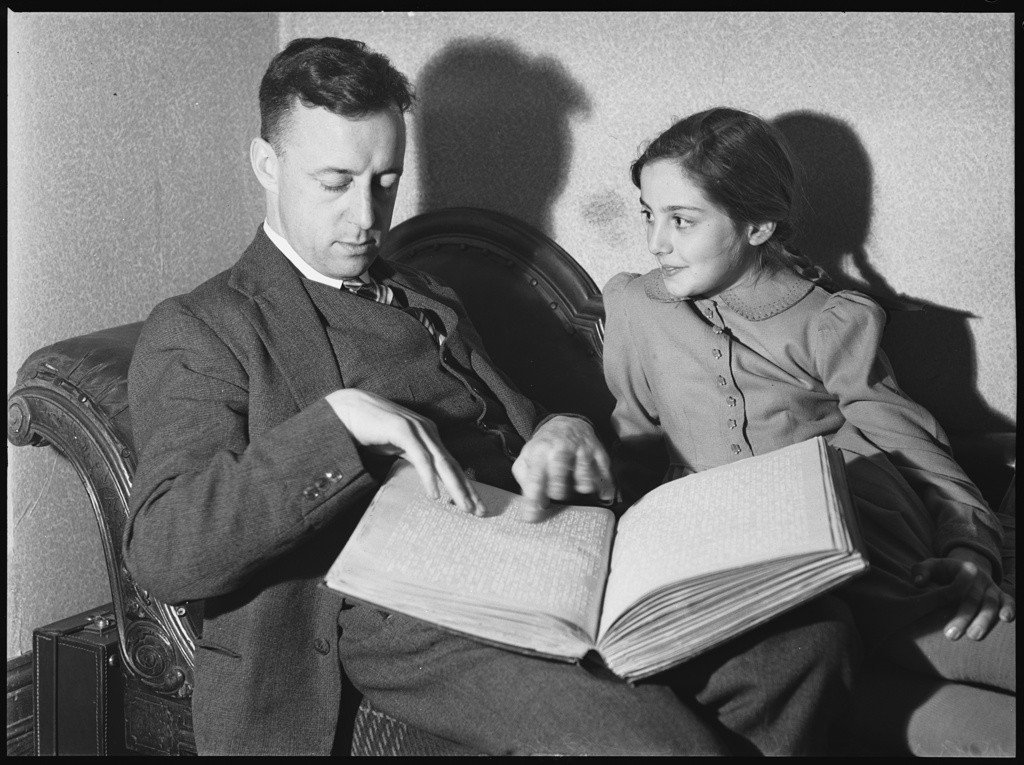
David Hunter reading from a Braille book with an unidentified girl

Hunter was active in advocating for the deaf and blind communities throughout his lifetime. He served as the vice-president of the Institute for Deaf and Blind Children and as honorary treasurer of the Blinded Servicemen's Club. He was responsible for legislation in 1944 which made the education of deaf and blind children compulsory; upon his death, a number of MLAs spoke of his efforts to ensure that the deaf and blind were treated as ordinary citizens. He was also concerned with issues of disadvantaged children, serving as chairman of the Society for Providing Homes for Neglected Children, and acting as a board member and frequent supporter of a nearby orphanage. Hunter was also a strong advocate for improved parliamentary services to allow members to better represent constituents. He campaigned for increased secretarial assistance, and as a member of the Library Committee for several decades, vigorously defended the independence of the Parliamentary Library.

Hunter was highly popular in his electorate, and won thirteen consecutive elections in Croydon and its successor electorates. He ran unopposed in 1950, and easily defeated fellow UAP MLA Richard Murden in 1959 when their seats were merged in an electoral redistribution. He was only forced to preferences twice; at his last two elections, in 1971 and 1973, and took 52% of the vote at his closest re-election in 1971. He retired at the 1976 election, where his seat of Ashfield was won by the Labor Party, remaining safely Labor thereafter until its abolition in 1999.

Hunter was made an Officer of the Order of British Empire (OBE) in 1975. He died in Sydney in 1981.

New South Wales Legislative Assembly
Preceded by Bertram Stevens	Member for Croydon; 1940–1959	Succeeded by Seat abolished
Preceded by Seat created	Member for Ashfield-Croydon; 1959–1968	Succeeded by Seat abolished
Preceded by Seat recreated	Member for Ashfield; 1968–1976	Succeeded by Paul Whelan
