= Electoral results for the district of Waverley =

Election results for Waverley, New South Wales, Australia

Waverley, an electoral district of the Legislative Assembly in the Australian state of New South Wales had three incarnations, 1894 to 1920, 1927 to 1959 and 1971 until 1991.

Election	Member	Party
1894	Angus Cameron	Free Trade
1895	Angus Cameron	Free Trade
1896 by	Thomas Jessep	Free Trade
1898	Thomas Jessep	Free Trade
1901	Thomas Jessep	Liberal Reform
1904	Thomas Jessep	Liberal Reform
1907	James Macarthur-Onslow	Independent Liberal
1910	James Macarthur-Onslow	Liberal Reform
1913	James Fingleton	Labor
1917	Charles Oakes	Nationalist
Second incarnation (1927–1959)
Member	Party	Term
1927	Carl Glasgow	Nationalist
1930	William Clementson	Labor
1932	John Waddell	United Australia
1935	John Waddell	United Australia
1938	John Waddell	United Australia
1939 by	Clarrie Martin	Industrial Labor / Labor
1941	Clarrie Martin	Labor
1944	Clarrie Martin	Labor
1947	Clarrie Martin	Labor
1950	Clarrie Martin	Labor
1953	Clarrie Martin	Labor
1953 by	William Ferguson	Labor
1956	William Ferguson	Labor
Third incarnation (1971–1991)
Member	Party	Term
1971	Syd Einfeld	Labor
1973	Syd Einfeld	Labor
1976	Syd Einfeld	Labor
1978	Syd Einfeld	Labor
1981	Ernie Page	Labor
1984	Ernie Page	Labor
1988	Ernie Page	Labor

== Election results ==
=== Elections in the 1980s ===
==== 1988 ====
1988 New South Wales state election: Waverley
Party	Candidate	Votes	%	±%
Labor	Ernie Page	12,360	46.2	−3.3
Liberal	Sally Betts	12,063	45.1	+4.3
Democrats	Heather Meers	2,315	8.7	+1.8
Total formal votes		26,738	96.9	+0.4
Informal votes		843	3.1	−0.4
Turnout		27,581	90.1	
Two-party-preferred result
Labor	Ernie Page	13,303	50.5	−3.9
Liberal	Sally Betts	13,016	49.5	+3.9
Labor hold		Swing	−3.9	

==== 1984 ====
1984 New South Wales state election: Waverley
Party	Candidate	Votes	%	±%
Labor	Ernie Page	13,255	49.2	−12.7
Liberal	Dick Davidson	11,279	41.8	+3.7
Democrats	Heather Meers	1,722	6.4	+6.4
Independent	Peter Kristofferson	483	1.8	+1.8
Independent	Dorothy Sekers	225	0.8	+0.8
Total formal votes		26,964	96.4	+1.2
Informal votes		1,009	3.6	−1.2
Turnout		27,973	86.7	+0.9
Two-party-preferred result
Labor	Ernie Page	14,266	53.7	−8.2
Liberal	Dick Davidson	12,326	46.3	+8.2
Labor hold		Swing	−8.2	

==== 1981 ====
1981 New South Wales state election: Waverley
Party	Candidate	Votes	%	±%
Labor	Ernie Page	16,796	61.9	−3.7
Liberal	Albert Ross	10,350	38.1	+10.7
Total formal votes		27,146	95.2	
Informal votes		1,375	4.8	
Turnout		28,521	85.8	
Labor hold		Swing	−6.9	

=== Elections in the 1970s ===
==== 1978 ====
1978 New South Wales state election: Waverley
Party	Candidate	Votes	%	±%
Labor	Syd Einfeld	15,649	65.6	+8.6
Liberal	Margaret Davis	6,543	27.4	−15.6
Independent	Moshe Levy	647	2.7	+2.7
Democrats	Michael Smythe	607	2.6	+2.6
Independent	Christopher Allen	393	1.7	+1.7
Total formal votes		23,839	96.4	−1.0
Informal votes		891	3.6	+1.0
Turnout		24,730	86.2	−1.9
Two-party-preferred result
Labor	Syd Einfeld	16,396	68.8	+11.8
Liberal	Margaret Davis	7,443	31.2	−11.8
Labor hold		Swing	+11.8	

==== 1976 ====
1976 New South Wales state election: Waverley
Party	Candidate	Votes	%	±%
Labor	Syd Einfeld	14,691	57.0	+5.9
Liberal	Geoffrey Mort	11,075	43.0	+4.8
Total formal votes		25,766	97.4	−1.2
Informal votes		696	2.6	+1.2
Turnout		26,462	88.1	+1.6
Labor hold		Swing	+0.6	

==== 1973 ====
1973 New South Wales state election: Waverley
Party	Candidate	Votes	%	±%
Labor	Syd Einfeld	12,065	51.1	−7.5
Liberal	Hans Dreyer	9,031	38.2	−3.2
Australia	Virginia Walker	1,586	6.7	+6.7
Democratic Labor	Dominique Droulers	604	2.6	+2.6
Independent	Martin Smith	341	1.4	+1.4
Total formal votes		23,627	95.7	
Informal votes		1,055	4.3	
Turnout		24,682	86.5	
Two-party-preferred result
Labor	Syd Einfeld	13,322	56.4	−2.2
Liberal	Hans Dreyer	10,305	43.6	+2.2
Labor hold		Swing	−2.2	

==== 1971 ====
1971 New South Wales state election: Waverley
Party	Candidate	Votes	%	±%
Labor	Syd Einfeld	13,781	58.6	+5.5
Liberal	James Markham	9,736	41.4	−5.5
Total formal votes		23,517	96.8	
Informal votes		770	3.2	
Turnout		24,287	89.6	
Labor notional hold		Swing	+5.5	

==== 1959 - 1971 ====
District abolished

=== Elections in the 1950s ===
==== 1956 ====
1956 New South Wales state election: Waverley
Party	Candidate	Votes	%	±%
Labor	William Ferguson	11,373	58.6	−9.9
Liberal	John Steinwede	7,145	36.8	+5.3
Communist	Eddie Maher	900	4.6	+4.6
Total formal votes		19,418	97.9	0.0
Informal votes		425	2.1	0.0
Turnout		19,843	90.8	−0.3
Two-party-preferred result
Labor	William Ferguson	12,183	62.7	−5.8
Liberal	John Steinwede	7,235	37.3	+5.8
Labor hold		Swing	−5.8	

==== 1953 by-election ====
1953 Waverley by-election Saturday 31 October
Party	Candidate	Votes	%	±%
Labor	William Ferguson	11,284	61.0	−7.5
Liberal	Ben Doig	6,678	36.1	+4.6
Independent	Edward Maher	539	2.9	
Total formal votes		18,501	98.2	+0.3
Informal votes		338	1.8	−0.3
Turnout		18,839	81.7	−9.3
Labor hold		Swing		

- Preferences were not distributed.
- Clarrie Martin (Labor) died.

==== 1953 ====
1953 New South Wales state election: Waverley
Party	Candidate	Votes	%	±%
Labor	Clarrie Martin	14,354	68.5	
Liberal	Ben Doig	6,604	31.5	
Total formal votes		20,958	97.9	
Informal votes		456	2.1	
Turnout		21,414	91.1	
Labor hold		Swing		

==== 1950 ====
1950 New South Wales state election: Waverley
Party	Candidate	Votes	%	±%
Labor	Clarrie Martin	11,415	60.9	
Liberal	Ross McKinnon	7,324	39.1	
Total formal votes		18,739	98.9	
Informal votes		215	1.1	
Turnout		18,954	91.1	
Labor hold		Swing		

=== Elections in the 1940s ===
==== 1947 ====
1947 New South Wales state election: Waverley
Party	Candidate	Votes	%	±%
Labor	Clarrie Martin	13,481	62.5	−37.5
Liberal	Thomas Fairbairn	8,095	37.5	+37.5
Total formal votes		21,576	98.7	
Informal votes		288	1.3	
Turnout		21,864	92.3	
Labor hold		Swing	N/A	

==== 1944 ====
1944 New South Wales state election: Waverley
Party	Candidate	Votes	%	±%
Labor	Clarrie Martin	unopposed		
Labor hold				

==== 1941 ====
1941 New South Wales state election: Waverley
Party	Candidate	Votes	%	±%
Labor	Clarrie Martin	11,464	57.7	
United Australia	Arnold Lander	6,004	30.2	
State Labor	John Fisher	2,408	12.1	
Total formal votes		19,876	98.2	
Informal votes		357	1.8	
Turnout		20,233	90.9	
Labor hold		Swing		

- Preferences were not distributed.

=== Elections in the 1930s ===
==== 1939 by-election ====
1939 Waverley by-election Saturday 22 April
Party	Candidate	Votes	%	±%
Industrial Labor	Clarrie Martin	6,397	34.8	
United Australia	Ella Waddell (Note: Ella Waddell was the widow of former member John Waddell.)	6,539	34.6	−16.8
Labor	James Ormonde	5,630	30.6	−18.0
Total formal votes		18,386	98.0	−0.1
Informal votes		370	2.0	+0.1
Turnout		18,756	93.0	−1.9
Two-party-preferred result
Industrial Labor	Clarrie Martin	10,477	56.8	
United Australia	Ella Waddell	7,939	43.2	−8.2
Industrial Labor gain from United Australia		Swing	N/A	

John Waddell (United Australia) died.

==== 1938 ====
1938 New South Wales state election: Waverley
Party	Candidate	Votes	%	±%
United Australia	John Waddell	10,210	51.4	+1.2
Labor	William Clementson	9,641	48.6	+2.7
Total formal votes		19,851	98.1	−0.2
Informal votes		380	1.9	+0.2
Turnout		20,231	94.9	−0.9
United Australia hold		Swing	N/A	

==== 1935 ====
1935 New South Wales state election: Waverley
Party	Candidate	Votes	%	±%
United Australia	John Waddell	9,344	50.2	−2.1
Labor (NSW)	William Clementson	8,545	45.9	+3.7
Federal Labor	Alexander Hogan	732	3.9	−1.0
Total formal votes		18,621	98.3	−0.4
Informal votes		314	1.7	+0.4
Turnout		18,935	95.8	0.0
United Australia hold		Swing	N/A	

- Preferences were not distributed.

==== 1932 ====
1932 New South Wales state election: Waverley
Party	Candidate	Votes	%	±%
United Australia	John Waddell	9,644	52.3	+15.0
Labor (NSW)	William Clementson	7,789	42.2	−15.3
Federal Labor	Albert Gardiner	904	4.9	+4.9
Communist	Esmonde Higgins	102	0.6	+0.6
Total formal votes		18,439	98.7	+1.9
Informal votes		249	1.3	−1.9
Turnout		18,688	95.8	+2.5
United Australia gain from Labor (NSW)		Swing	N/A	

- Preferences were not distributed.

==== 1930 ====
1930 New South Wales state election: Waverley
Party	Candidate	Votes	%	±%
Labor	William Clementson	9,994	57.5	
Nationalist	Guy Arkins (defeated)	6,487	37.3	
Australian	George Overhill	901	5.2	
Total formal votes		17,382	96.8	
Informal votes		578	3.2	
Turnout		17,960	93.3	
Labor gain from Nationalist		Swing		

Guy Arkins (Nationalist) was the sitting member for the abolished district of Rockdale.

=== Elections in the 1920s ===
==== 1927 ====
1927 New South Wales state election: Waverley
Party	Candidate	Votes	%	±%
Nationalist	Carl Glasgow	7,501	55.4	
Labor	Archibald Moate	6,038	44.6	
Total formal votes		13,539	99.3	
Informal votes		92	0.7	
Turnout		13,631	86.7	
Nationalist win		(new seat)		

==== 1920 - 1927 ====
District abolished

=== Elections in the 1910s ===
==== 1917 ====
1917 New South Wales state election: Waverley
Party	Candidate	Votes	%	±%
Nationalist	Charles Oakes	5,136	56.7	+13.8
Labor	James Fingleton	3,919	43.3	+5.7
Total formal votes		9,055	99.2	+1.7
Informal votes		69	0.8	−1.7
Turnout		9,124	63.9	−6.0
Nationalist gain from Labor		Swing	+7.0	

==== 1913 ====
1913 New South Wales state election: Waverley
Party	Candidate	Votes	%	±%
Liberal Reform	Harold Jaques	3,743	42.9	
Labor	James Fingleton	3,280	37.6	
National Progressive	George Beeby	1,698	19.5	
Total formal votes		8,721	97.5	
Informal votes		220	2.5	
Turnout		8,941	69.9	

1913 New South Wales state election: Waverley - Second Round Saturday 13 December
Party	Candidate	Votes	%	±%
Labor	James Fingleton	4,609	50.3	
Liberal Reform	Harold Jaques	4,547	49.7	
Total formal votes		9,156	99.4	
Informal votes		55	0.6	
Turnout		9,211	72.0	
Labor gain from Liberal Reform				

==== 1910 ====
1910 New South Wales state election: Waverley
Party	Candidate	Votes	%	±%
Liberal Reform	James Macarthur-Onslow	5,175	52.4	+4.0
Labour	Walter Duncan	3,706	37.5	+31.6
Independent Liberal	Robert Watkins	921	9.3	
Independent	Henry Douglass	74	0.8	
Total formal votes		9,876	99.3	+0.8
Informal votes		72	0.7	+0.5
Turnout		9,948	73.2	−0.1
Member changed to Liberal Reform from Independent Liberal				

=== Elections in the 1900s ===
==== 1907 ====
1907 New South Wales state election: Waverley
Party	Candidate	Votes	%	±%
Independent Liberal	James Macarthur-Onslow	3,769	48.4	
Liberal Reform	Thomas Jessep	3,189	40.9	
Labour	Edward Whittington	458	5.9	
Independent	Frank Lock	379	4.9	
Total formal votes		7,795	98.5	
Informal votes		119	1.5	
Turnout		7,914	73.3	
Independent Liberal gain from Liberal Reform				

==== 1904 ====
1904 New South Wales state election: Waverley
Party	Candidate	Votes	%	±%
Liberal Reform	Thomas Jessep	2,630	63.0	
Labour	Alfred Warton	1,080	25.9	
Independent Liberal	James Conroy	467	11.2	
Total formal votes		4,177	99.2	
Informal votes		35	0.8	
Turnout		4,212	48.3	
Liberal Reform hold				

Waverley lost part of the seat to Randwick and was expanded to include parts of Woollahra and Randwick. The member for Waverley was Thomas Jessep (Liberal Reform). The member for Randwick was David Storey (Liberal Reform) while the member for Woollahra was William Latimer and each retained their respective seats.

==== 1901 ====
1901 New South Wales state election: Waverley
Party	Candidate	Votes	%	±%
Liberal Reform	Thomas Jessep	1,035	48.9	−7.4
Independent	James Macarthur-Onslow	886	41.8	−1.8
Independent Liberal	Alfred Allen	171	8.1	
Independent	John Carroll	18	0.9	+0.3
Independent	David Penfold	8	0.4	
Total formal votes		2,118	99.1	−0.0
Informal votes		19	0.9	+0.1
Turnout		2,137	61.9	−1.1
Liberal Reform hold				

=== Elections in the 1890s ===
==== 1898 ====
1898 New South Wales colonial election: Waverley
Party	Candidate	Votes	%	±%
Free Trade	Thomas Jessep	998	56.3	
National Federal	James Onslow	773	43.6	
Independent Federalist	William Blunt	2	0.1	
Total formal votes		1,773	99.2	
Informal votes		15	0.8	
Turnout		1,788	63.1	
Free Trade hold				

==== 1896 by-election ====
1896 Waverley colonial by-election
Party	Candidate	Votes	%	±%
Free Trade	Thomas Jessep	698	50.4	+6.9
Protectionist	Thomas Barlow	528	38.1	+5.5
Independent	Sir Henry Parkes	160	11.5	+11.5
Total formal votes		1,386	99.4	+0.1
Informal votes		9	0.7	−0.2
Turnout		1,395	62.2 (Note: Estimate based on a roll of 2,242 at the 1895 election.)	−2.2
Free Trade hold				

==== 1895 ====
1895 New South Wales colonial election: Waverley
Party	Candidate	Votes	%	±%
Free Trade	Angus Cameron	622	43.5	
Protectionist	Thomas Barlow	466	32.6	
Ind. Free Trade	Alfred Allen	298	20.8	
Ind. Protectionist	William Allen	45	3.1	
Total formal votes		1,431	99.2	
Informal votes		12	0.8	
Turnout		1,443	64.4	
Free Trade hold				

==== 1894 ====
1894 New South Wales colonial election: Waverley
Party	Candidate	Votes	%	±%
Free Trade	Angus Cameron	747	40.5	
Protectionist	Thomas Barlow	475	25.8	
Ind. Free Trade	Alfred Allen	369	20.0	
Labour	Thomas Kemp	245	13.3	
Ind. Protectionist	James Carroll	9	0.5	
Total formal votes		1,845	99.3	
Informal votes		13	0.7	
Turnout		1,858	81.7	
Free Trade win		(new seat)		
