= Results of the 1938 New South Wales state election =

State election for New South Wales, Australia in March 1938

New South Wales state election, 26 March 1938 Legislative Assembly << 1935–1941 >>
Enrolled voters	1,607,833 (Note: A total of 19 electorates (six UAP, three Country, and ten Labor) were uncontested, representing 338,853 voters.)				
Votes cast	1,183,257		Turnout	95.79	–0.27
Informal votes	32,237		Informal	2.65	–0.39
Summary of votes by party
Party	Primary votes	%	Swing	Seats	Change
United Australia	424,275	35.86	+2.76	37	– 1
Labor	412,063	34.82	–7.60	28	–1
Country	164,045	13.86	+0.94	22	–1
Industrial Labor	43,735	3.70	+3.70	2	+2
Communist	10,386	0.88	–0.6	0	±0
Independents	128,753	10.88	+6.4	1	+1
Total	1,183,257			90	

The 1938 New South Wales state election was for 90 electoral districts each returning a single member with compulsory preferential voting.

== Results by electoral district ==
=== Albury ===
1938 New South Wales state election: Albury
Party	Candidate	Votes	%	±%
United Australia	Alexander Mair	7,356	57.8	−1.2
Labor	Edward Jones	5,380	42.2	+1.2
Total formal votes		12,736	99.3	+0.9
Informal votes		91	0.7	−0.9
Turnout		12,827	95.7	+0.2
United Australia hold		Swing	−1.2	

=== Annandale ===
1938 New South Wales state election: Annandale
Party	Candidate	Votes	%	±%
Labor	Bob Gorman	unopposed		
Labor hold				

=== Armidale ===
1938 New South Wales state election: Armidale
Party	Candidate	Votes	%	±%
Country	David Drummond	7,264	56.3	−43.7
Independent	Charles Hobbs	4,248	33.0	+33.0
Independent	William Broun	1,380	10.7	+10.7
Total formal votes		12,892	97.8	
Informal votes		294	2.2	
Turnout		13,186	96.5	
Country hold		Swing	N/A	

- Preferences were not distributed.

=== Arncliffe ===
1938 New South Wales state election: Arncliffe
Party	Candidate	Votes	%	±%
Labor	Joseph Cahill	9,885	51.9	+5.8
United Australia	Ernest Barton	9,156	48.1	+4.2
Total formal votes		19,041	98.5	+1.0
Informal votes		297	1.5	−1.0
Turnout		19,338	97.2	−0.4
Labor hold		Swing	+0.3	

=== Ashburnham ===
1938 New South Wales state election: Ashburnham
Party	Candidate	Votes	%	±%
Country	Hilton Elliott	6,409	48.4	−4.5
Labor	Edgar Dring	5,779	43.6	−3.5
Independent	William Gibbons	1,065	8.0	+8.0
Total formal votes		13,253	98.7	−0.2
Informal votes		175	1.3	+0.2
Turnout		13,428	96.8	0.0
Two-party-preferred result
Country	Hilton Elliott	6,963	52.5	−0.4
Labor	Edgar Dring	6,290	47.5	+0.4
Country hold		Swing	−0.4	

=== Ashfield ===
1938 New South Wales state election: Ashfield
Party	Candidate	Votes	%	±%
United Australia	Athol Richardson	8,921	53.7	+0.9
Independent	Thomas Cavill	7,692	46.3	+46.3
Total formal votes		16,613	97.1	−1.4
Informal votes		498	2.9	+1.4
Turnout		17,111	95.7	−1.0
United Australia hold		Swing	N/A	

=== Auburn ===
1938 New South Wales state election: Auburn
Party	Candidate	Votes	%	±%
Labor	Jack Lang	10,771	59.2	+2.6
Industrial Labor	Jack Hooke	7,416	40.8	+40.8
Total formal votes		18,187	95.2	−3.1
Informal votes		906	4.8	+3.1
Turnout		19,093	95.9	−0.4
Labor hold		Swing	N/A	

=== Balmain ===
1938 New South Wales state election: Balmain
Party	Candidate	Votes	%	±%
Labor	John Quirk	11,763	72.1	+8.2
Independent	John O'Carroll	3,089	18.9	+18.9
Communist	Thomas Payne	1,459	8.9	+3.7
Total formal votes		16,311	95.1	−2.1
Informal votes		844	4.9	+2.1
Turnout		17,155	96.6	−0.5
Labor hold		Swing	N/A	

- Preferences were not distributed.

=== Bankstown ===
1938 New South Wales state election: Bankstown
Party	Candidate	Votes	%	±%
Labor	James McGirr	unopposed		
Labor hold				

=== Barwon ===
1938 New South Wales state election: Barwon
Party	Candidate	Votes	%	±%
Country	Ben Wade	8,016	55.4	−2.5
Labor	Thomas Kane	6,452	44.6	+2.5
Total formal votes		14,468	98.8	+1.7
Informal votes		174	1.2	−1.7
Turnout		14,642	95.1	+1.9
Country hold		Swing	−2.5	

=== Bathurst ===
1938 New South Wales state election: Bathurst
Party	Candidate	Votes	%	±%
Labor	Gus Kelly	7,455	54.2	+16.2
United Australia	Thomas Mutch	4,789	34.8	+34.8
Country	Roland Green	1,504	10.9	−33.2
Total formal votes		13,748	98.3	−0.1
Informal votes		236	1.7	+0.1
Turnout		13,984	96.6	−1.0
Labor hold		Swing	N/A	

- Preferences were not distributed.

=== Bondi ===
1938 New South Wales state election: Bondi
Party	Candidate	Votes	%	±%
United Australia	Norman Thomas	12,223	52.3	−11.5
Labor	Henry Collins	5,946	25.4	−10.8
Independent	Thomas Hogan	4,357	18.6	+18.6
Independent	Richard Brown	851	3.6	+3.6
Total formal votes		23,377	98.0	−0.3
Informal votes		474	2.0	+0.3
Turnout		23,851	95.8	−0.2
United Australia hold		Swing	N/A	

- Preferences were not distributed.

=== Botany ===
1938 New South Wales state election: Botany
Party	Candidate	Votes	%	±%
Industrial Labor	Bob Heffron	13,865	60.3	
Labor	Francis Kelly	9,118	39.7	
Total formal votes		22,983	95.2	
Informal votes		1,150	4.8	
Turnout		24,133	96.8	
Member changed to Industrial Labor from Labor		Swing	N/A	

=== Bulli ===
1938 New South Wales state election: Bulli
Party	Candidate	Votes	%	±%
Labor	John Sweeney	7,380	54.6	−26.1
Independent	Edward Ryan	3,413	25.2	+25.2
Communist	Jack Miles	2,731	20.2	+0.9
Total formal votes		13,524	95.4	+13.7
Informal votes		655	4.6	−13.7
Turnout		14,179	95.1	−1.3
Labor hold		Swing	N/A	

- Preferences were not distributed.

=== Burwood ===
1938 New South Wales state election: Burwood
Party	Candidate	Votes	%	±%
United Australia	Harrie Mitchell	9,199	51.0	+51.0
United Australia	Gordon Jackett	8,853	49.0	−13.4
Total formal votes		18,052	92.3	−6.2
Informal votes		1,503	7.7	+6.2
Turnout		19,555	95.6	−0.9
United Australia hold		Swing	N/A	

=== Byron ===
1938 New South Wales state election: Byron
Party	Candidate	Votes	%	±%
Country	Arthur Budd	7,986	57.7	+5.5
Independent	Frederick Stuart	5,849	42.3	+19.9
Total formal votes		13,835	97.6	−0.8
Informal votes		340	2.4	+0.8
Turnout		14,175	94.8	+0.3
Country hold		Swing	N/A	

=== Canterbury ===
1938 New South Wales state election: Canterbury
Party	Candidate	Votes	%	±%
Labor	Arthur Tonge	10,690	54.3	+3.7
United Australia	Edward Hocking	8,991	45.7	0.0
Total formal votes		19,681	98.7	+0.3
Informal votes		266	1.3	−0.3
Turnout		19,947	97.1	−0.5
Labor hold		Swing	N/A	

=== Casino ===
1938 New South Wales state election: Casino
Party	Candidate	Votes	%	±%
Country	John Reid	unopposed		
Country hold				

=== Castlereagh ===
1938 New South Wales state election: Castlereagh
Party	Candidate	Votes	%	±%
Country	Alfred Yeo	6,821	51.4	−0.2
Labor	Les Murphy	6,454	48.6	+0.2
Total formal votes		13,275	98.1	−0.3
Informal votes		260	1.9	+0.3
Turnout		13,535	94.1	−0.9
Country hold		Swing	−0.2	

=== Cessnock ===
1938 New South Wales state election: Cessnock
Party	Candidate	Votes	%	±%
Labor	Jack Baddeley	12,106	69.3	+0.9
Industrial Labor	Eugene O'Neill	5,360	30.7	+30.7
Total formal votes		17,466	97.6	0.0
Informal votes		435	2.4	0.0
Turnout		17,901	96.6	+0.4
Labor hold		Swing	N/A	

=== Clarence ===
1938 New South Wales state election: Clarence
Party	Candidate	Votes	%	±%
Country	Cecil Wingfield	7,754	51.9	+51.9
Country	Alfred Henry	7,194	48.1	−13.2
Total formal votes		14,948	98.3	+1.9
Informal votes		254	1.7	−1.9
Turnout		15,202	95.9	−0.1
Country hold		Swing	N/A	

=== Cobar ===
1938 New South Wales state election: Cobar
Party	Candidate	Votes	%	±%
Labor	Mat Davidson	unopposed		
Labor hold				

=== Concord ===
1938 New South Wales state election: Concord
Party	Candidate	Votes	%	±%
United Australia	Stan Lloyd	10,489	56.4	+5.5
Labor	Leonard Thompson	8,121	43.6	+3.6
Total formal votes		18,610	98.3	+0.4
Informal votes		317	1.7	−0.4
Turnout		18,927	96.7	−1.0
United Australia hold		Swing	N/A	

=== Coogee ===
1938 New South Wales state election: Coogee
Party	Candidate	Votes	%	±%
United Australia	John Dunningham	16,039	71.3	+4.2
Independent	Mark Foots	6,470	28.7	+28.7
Total formal votes		22,509	96.5	−1.5
Informal votes		812	3.5	+1.5
Turnout		23,321	94.2	−0.7
United Australia hold		Swing	N/A	

=== Cootamundra ===
1938 New South Wales state election: Cootamundra
Party	Candidate	Votes	%	±%
Country	Bill Ross	6,698	51.2	−1.5
Labor	Ken Hoad	6,382	48.8	+1.5
Total formal votes		13,080	98.5	0.0
Informal votes		205	1.5	0.0
Turnout		13,285	96.5	−1.3
Country hold		Swing	−1.5	

=== Corowa ===
1938 New South Wales state election: Corowa
Party	Candidate	Votes	%	±%
Independent	Christopher Lethbridge	6,333	52.2	+52.2
Country	Ebenezer Kendell	4,973	41.0	−59.0
Independent	Clive Walker	833	6.9	+6.9
Total formal votes		12,139	98.5	
Informal votes		185	1.5	
Turnout		12,324	94.4	
Independent gain from Country		Swing	N/A	

Christopher Lethbridge (Independent) had won the seat at the 1937 by-election following the death of Richard Ball (Country).

=== Croydon ===
1938 New South Wales state election: Croydon
Party	Candidate	Votes	%	±%
United Australia	Bertram Stevens	11,765	69.6	+5.1
Independent	Garry Gordon	5,142	30.4	+30.4
Total formal votes		16,907	93.9	−4.5
Informal votes		1,104	6.1	+4.5
Turnout		18,011	94.7	−1.2
United Australia hold		Swing	N/A	

=== Drummoyne ===
1938 New South Wales state election: Drummoyne
Party	Candidate	Votes	%	±%
United Australia	John Lee	11,299	60.1	+0.1
Labor	Ray Maher	7,497	39.9	−0.1
Total formal votes		18,796	97.8	+0.3
Informal votes		429	2.2	−0.3
Turnout		19,225	96.6	−0.8
United Australia hold		Swing	+0.1	

=== Dubbo ===
1938 New South Wales state election: Dubbo
Party	Candidate	Votes	%	±%
Country	George Wilson	7,656	55.1	+0.1
Labor	Leo Taylor	6,242	44.9	−0.1
Total formal votes		13,898	97.9	−0.5
Informal votes		292	2.1	+0.5
Turnout		14,190	95.4	−1.2
Country hold		Swing	+0.1	

=== Dulwich Hill ===
1938 New South Wales state election: Dulwich Hill
Party	Candidate	Votes	%	±%
United Australia	Guy Arkins	7,364	36.7	−25.2
Labor	Leslie Morrow	6,992	34.9	−3.2
United Australia	Ronald McCredie	5,686	28.4	+28.4
Total formal votes		20,042	98.4	+0.2
Informal votes		326	1.6	−0.2
Turnout		20,368	96.5	−0.2
Two-party-preferred result
United Australia	Guy Arkins	12,497	62.3	+0.4
Labor	Leslie Morrow	7,545	37.7	−0.4
United Australia hold		Swing	+0.4	

=== Georges River ===
1938 New South Wales state election: Georges River
Party	Candidate	Votes	%	±%
United Australia	Cecil Monro	13,222	57.4	+5.7
Labor	Albert Kealman	9,811	42.6	−2.1
Total formal votes		23,033	97.3	−0.2
Informal votes		633	2.7	+0.2
Turnout		23,666	96.3	−0.3
United Australia hold		Swing	N/A	

=== Glebe ===
1938 New South Wales state election: Glebe
Party	Candidate	Votes	%	±%
Labor	Bill Carlton	7,023	46.0	−13.0
Industrial Labor	Horace Foley	6,218	40.7	+40.7
Independent	Bertie Lewis	2,021	13.2	+13.2
Total formal votes		15,262	96.8	−1.0
Informal votes		500	3.2	+1.0
Turnout		15,762	95.9	+0.3
Two-candidate-preferred result
Labor	Bill Carlton	7,899	51.8	
Industrial Labor	Horace Foley	7,363	48.2	
Labor hold		Swing	N/A	

=== Gloucester ===
1938 New South Wales state election: Gloucester
Party	Candidate	Votes	%	±%
United Australia	Charles Bennett	7,732	54.3	−45.7
Independent	Ray Fitzgerald	5,010	35.2	+35.2
Independent	Henry Rooke	1,492	10.5	+10.5
Total formal votes		14,234	98.4	
Informal votes		238	1.6	
Turnout		14,472	96.2	
United Australia hold		Swing	N/A	

- Preferences were not distributed.

=== Gordon ===
1938 New South Wales state election: Gordon
Party	Candidate	Votes	%	±%
United Australia	Harry Turner	10,557	50.02	
United Australia	William Milne	10,548	49.98	
Total formal votes		21,105	96.6	
Informal votes		739	3.4	
Turnout		21,844	95.1	
United Australia hold		Swing	N/A	

=== Goulburn ===
1938 New South Wales state election: Goulburn
Party	Candidate	Votes	%	±%
Labor	Jack Tully	6,284	51.3	+0.8
United Australia	Peter Loughlin	3,200	26.1	−23.4
Country	Frederick Davies	2,702	22.0	+22.0
Independent	Robert Tatham	66	0.5	+0.5
Total formal votes		12,252	98.2	+0.6
Informal votes		221	1.8	−0.6
Turnout		12,473	97.7	+0.1
Labor hold		Swing	N/A	

- Preferences were not distributed.

=== Granville ===
1938 New South Wales state election: Granville
Party	Candidate	Votes	%	±%
Labor	Bill Lamb	10,999	51.8	+8.2
United Australia	Claude Fleck	10,227	48.2	+5.0
Total formal votes		21,226	97.9	+0.9
Informal votes		449	2.1	−0.9
Turnout		21,675	97.0	−0.9
Labor gain from United Australia		Swing	+2.0	

=== Hamilton ===
1938 New South Wales state election: Hamilton
Party	Candidate	Votes	%	±%
Labor	Joshua Arthur	unopposed		
Labor hold				

=== Hartley ===
1938 New South Wales state election: Hartley
Party	Candidate	Votes	%	±%
Labor	Hamilton Knight	unopposed		
Labor hold				

=== Hawkesbury ===
1938 New South Wales state election: Hawkesbury
Party	Candidate	Votes	%	±%
United Australia	Bruce Walker Jr	8,676	56.0	−13.7
Independent	Victor Gillespie	6,803	44.0	+44.0
Total formal votes		15,479	97.4	+0.4
Informal votes		406	2.6	−0.4
Turnout		15,885	95.9	+0.1
United Australia hold		Swing	−13.7	

=== Hornsby ===
1938 New South Wales state election: Hornsby
Party	Candidate	Votes	%	±%
United Australia	James Shand	8,238	39.4	−41.9
United Australia	Sydney Storey	6,012	28.7	+28.7
United Australia	William Henson	4,936	23.6	+23.6
Independent	Howard Miscamble	1,741	8.3	+8.3
Total formal votes		20,927	95.4	+8.1
Informal votes		1,010	4.6	−8.1
Turnout		21,937	95.6	+0.3
Two-candidate-preferred result
United Australia	James Shand	11,082	53.0	
United Australia	Sydney Storey	9,845	47.0	
United Australia hold		Swing	N/A	

=== Hurstville ===
1938 New South Wales state election: Hurstville
Party	Candidate	Votes	%	±%
United Australia	James Webb	11,493	56.1	+5.8
Labor	Michael Croot	8,983	43.9	−2.5
Total formal votes		20,476	97.9	−0.3
Informal votes		440	2.1	+0.3
Turnout		20,916	97.1	−0.4
United Australia hold		Swing	N/A	

=== Illawarra ===
1938 New South Wales state election: Illawarra
Party	Candidate	Votes	%	±%
Labor	Billy Davies	unopposed		
Labor hold				

=== King ===
1938 New South Wales state election: King
Party	Candidate	Votes	%	±%
Labor	Daniel Clyne	7,841	51.1	−0.5
United Australia	Rowland Bowen	5,581	36.4	−7.2
Independent	Josiah Trenerry	1,488	9.7	+9.7
Independent	Patrick McDonnell	431	2.8	+2.8
Total formal votes		15,341	96.1	−0.7
Informal votes		626	3.9	+0.7
Turnout		15,967	90.9	−0.8
Labor hold		Swing	N/A	

- Preferences were not distributed.

=== Kogarah ===
1938 New South Wales state election: Kogarah
Party	Candidate	Votes	%	±%
United Australia	James Ross	11,633	53.2	−0.4
Labor	John Hibberd	8,368	38.3	−2.2
Independent	John Battye	1,863	8.5	+8.5
Total formal votes		21,864	98.3	+0.1
Informal votes		371	1.7	−0.1
Turnout		22,235	97.1	−0.5
United Australia hold		Swing	N/A	

- Preferences were not distributed.

=== Kurri Kurri ===
1938 New South Wales state election: Kurri Kurri
Party	Candidate	Votes	%	±%
Labor	George Booth	unopposed		
Labor hold				

=== Lachlan ===
1938 New South Wales state election: Lachlan
Party	Candidate	Votes	%	±%
Labor	John Grace	5,393	39.5	+4.1
Country	Griffith Evans	4,090	30.0	−34.6
Country	John Parker	1,661	12.2	+12.2
Country	Charles Thomas	1,475	10.8	+10.8
Independent	George Berry	1,032	7.6	+7.6
Total formal votes		13,651	97.8	−0.6
Informal votes		306	2.2	+0.6
Turnout		13,957	94.9	+0.2
Two-party-preferred result
Country	Griffith Evans	7,644	56.0	−8.6
Labor	John Grace	6,007	44.0	+8.6
Country hold		Swing	−8.6	

=== Lakemba ===
1938 New South Wales state election: Lakemba
Party	Candidate	Votes	%	±%
Labor	Fred Stanley	11,796	61.9	+5.1
Independent	William Dowe	7,276	38.1	+38.1
Total formal votes		19,072	96.6	−1.3
Informal votes		672	3.4	+1.3
Turnout		19,744	97.0	−0.1
Labor hold		Swing	N/A	

=== Lane Cove ===
1938 New South Wales state election: Lane Cove
Party	Candidate	Votes	%	±%
United Australia	Herbert FitzSimons	unopposed		
United Australia hold				

=== Leichhardt ===
1938 New South Wales state election: Leichhardt
Party	Candidate	Votes	%	±%
Labor	Claude Matthews	9,822	60.5	+3.4
Industrial Labor	James Dunn	3,870	23.8	+23.8
Independent	Arthur Doughty	2,542	15.7	+15.7
Total formal votes		16,234	96.0	−1.7
Informal votes		668	4.0	+1.7
Turnout		16,902	96.5	−1.1
Labor hold		Swing	N/A	

- Preferences were not distributed.

=== Lismore ===
1938 New South Wales state election: Lismore
Party	Candidate	Votes	%	±%
Country	William Frith	unopposed		
Country hold				

=== Liverpool Plains ===
1938 New South Wales state election: Liverpool Plains
Party	Candidate	Votes	%	±%
Country	Harry Carter	7,489	60.1	−1.0
Labor	Thomas Ryan	4,975	39.9	+1.0
Total formal votes		12,464	98.5	−0.1
Informal votes		194	1.5	+0.1
Turnout		12,658	95.2	−0.6
Country hold		Swing	−1.0	

=== Maitland ===
1938 New South Wales state election: Maitland
Party	Candidate	Votes	%	±%
United Australia	Walter Howarth	7,861	61.2	+3.9
Labor	Walter O'Hearn	4,988	38.8	−3.9
Total formal votes		12,849	98.9	+0.3
Informal votes		137	1.1	−0.3
Turnout		12,986	97.9	−0.2
United Australia hold		Swing	+3.9	

=== Manly ===
1938 New South Wales state election: Manly
Party	Candidate	Votes	%	±%
United Australia	Alfred Reid	13,538	57.4	−16.4
United Australia	Robert Miller	6,589	27.9	+27.9
Independent	Richard Fitzgerald	2,491	10.6	+10.6
United Australia	Alfred Seller	956	4.1	+4.1
Total formal votes		23,574	97.0	+6.3
Informal votes		729	3.0	−6.3
Turnout		24,303	95.8	+0.5
United Australia hold		Swing	N/A	

- Preferences were not distributed.

=== Marrickville ===
1938 New South Wales state election: Marrickville
Party	Candidate	Votes	%	±%
Industrial Labor	Carlo Lazzarini	7,006	39.2	+39.2
United Australia	Frederick Rushton	6,365	35.6	−9.2
Labor	Leslie Balzen	4,496	25.2	−30.0
Total formal votes		17,867	98.7	−0.1
Informal votes		235	1.3	+0.1
Turnout		18,102	97.4	−0.1
Two-party-preferred result
Industrial Labor	Carlo Lazzarini	10,960	61.3	+61.3
United Australia	Frederick Rushton	6,907	38.7	−6.1
Member changed to Industrial Labor from Labor		Swing	N/A	

=== Monaro ===
1938 New South Wales state election: Monaro
Party	Candidate	Votes	%	±%
Country	William Hedges	7,570	57.6	+0.7
Labor	Clarence Moore	5,567	42.4	−0.7
Total formal votes		13,137	98.7	0.0
Informal votes		168	1.3	0.0
Turnout		13,305	95.9	−1.2
Country hold		Swing	+0.7	

=== Mosman ===
1938 New South Wales state election: Mosman
Party	Candidate	Votes	%	±%
United Australia	Herbert Lloyd	10,191	54.7	−45.3
United Australia	Henry Storey	8,443	45.3	+45.3
Total formal votes		18,634	97.9	
Informal votes		402	2.1	
Turnout		19,036	95.8	
United Australia hold		Swing	N/A	

=== Mudgee ===
1938 New South Wales state election: Mudgee
Party	Candidate	Votes	%	±%
Labor	Bill Dunn	8,587	60.5	+7.8
Country	Eric Pye	3,279	23.1	−24.2
Country	Reginald Wilson	2,320	16.3	+16.3
Total formal votes		14,186	98.4	−1.0
Informal votes		229	1.6	+1.0
Turnout		14,415	96.4	−1.0
Labor hold		Swing	N/A	

- Preferences were not distributed.

=== Murray ===
1938 New South Wales state election: Murray
Party	Candidate	Votes	%	±%
Country	Joe Lawson	7,520	60.7	+9.7
Labor	James Lloyd	4,875	39.3	−9.7
Total formal votes		12,395	97.8	−0.8
Informal votes		281	2.2	+0.8
Turnout		12,676	90.2	−0.2
Country hold		Swing	+9.7	

=== Murrumbidgee ===
1938 New South Wales state election: Murrumbidgee
Party	Candidate	Votes	%	±%
Country	Robert Hankinson	7,640	50.5	−1.8
Labor	George Enticknap	7,495	49.5	+1.8
Total formal votes		15,135	98.5	+0.3
Informal votes		228	1.5	−0.3
Turnout		15,363	95.2	+0.4
Country hold		Swing	−1.8	

=== Namoi ===
1938 New South Wales state election: Namoi
Party	Candidate	Votes	%	±%
Country	Colin Sinclair	7,516	51.3	−1.3
Labor	Ernest Hogan	7,120	48.7	+1.3
Total formal votes		14,636	99.0	+0.4
Informal votes		150	1.0	−0.4
Turnout		14,786	96.6	+1.2
Country hold		Swing	−1.3	

=== Nepean ===
1938 New South Wales state election: Nepean
Party	Candidate	Votes	%	±%
United Australia	Joseph Jackson	6,993	44.1	−21.5
Labor	John Jackson	4,899	30.9	−3.5
United Australia	Arthur Hebblewhite	3,965	25.0	+25.0
Total formal votes		15,857	97.7	−0.1
Informal votes		379	2.3	+0.1
Turnout		16,236	95.0	+0.1
Two-party-preferred result
United Australia	Joseph Jackson	9,743	61.4	−4.2
Labor	John Jackson	6,114	38.6	+4.2
United Australia hold		Swing	−4.2	

=== Neutral Bay ===
1938 New South Wales state election: Neutral Bay
Party	Candidate	Votes	%	±%
United Australia	Reginald Weaver	unopposed		
United Australia hold				

=== Newcastle ===
1938 New South Wales state election: Newcastle
Party	Candidate	Votes	%	±%
Labor	Frank Hawkins	13,946	70.9	+19.3
Independent	Claude Dalby	5,735	29.1	+29.1
Total formal votes		19,681	96.7	+1.1
Informal votes		674	3.3	−1.1
Turnout		20,355	95.3	−0.8
Labor hold		Swing	N/A	

=== Newtown ===
1938 New South Wales state election: Newtown
Party	Candidate	Votes	%	±%
Labor	Frank Burke	11,757	70.9	+3.4
Independent	Cyril Glassop	4,831	29.1	+29.1
Total formal votes		16,588	97.1	0.0
Informal votes		503	2.9	0.0
Turnout		17,091	96.0	−0.9
Labor hold		Swing	N/A	

=== North Sydney ===
1938 New South Wales state election: North Sydney
Party	Candidate	Votes	%	±%
United Australia	Hubert Primrose	10,836	58.5	+2.9
Labor	Henry Clayden	7,692	41.5	+4.4
Total formal votes		18,528	97.9	+0.4
Informal votes		399	2.1	−0.4
Turnout		18,927	94.7	−1.7
United Australia hold		Swing	N/A	

=== Orange ===
1938 New South Wales state election: Orange
Party	Candidate	Votes	%	±%
United Australia	Alwyn Tonking	8,140	56.1	+2.1
Labor	Edward McGarry	6,380	43.9	−2.1
Total formal votes		14,520	98.6	+0.3
Informal votes		204	1.4	−0.3
Turnout		14,724	97.0	+0.2
United Australia hold		Swing	+2.1	

=== Oxley ===
1938 New South Wales state election: Oxley
Party	Candidate	Votes	%	±%
United Australia	Lewis Martin	8,255	55.4	−15.1
Independent	George Mitchell	6,642	44.6	+44.6
Total formal votes		14,897	98.3	0.0
Informal votes		252	1.7	0.0
Turnout		15,149	96.1	−0.1
United Australia hold		Swing	N/A	

=== Paddington ===
1938 New South Wales state election: Paddington
Party	Candidate	Votes	%	±%
Labor	Maurice O'Sullivan	13,768	90.2	+23.7
Communist	Lance Sharkey	1,503	9.8	+1.2
Total formal votes		15,271	92.3	−3.8
Informal votes		1,266	7.7	+3.8
Turnout		16,537	92.9	−0.5
Labor hold		Swing	N/A	

=== Parramatta ===
1938 New South Wales state election: Parramatta
Party	Candidate	Votes	%	±%
United Australia	George Gollan	12,878	61.1	+2.8
Labor	Albert Rowe	8,203	38.9	−0.1
Total formal votes		21,081	97.9	−0.4
Informal votes		445	2.1	+0.4
Turnout		21,526	96.5	0.0
United Australia hold		Swing	N/A	

=== Petersham ===
1938 New South Wales state election: Petersham
Party	Candidate	Votes	%	±%
United Australia	Eric Solomon	9,033	50.5	+1.4
Labor	Bill Sheahan	8,861	49.5	+4.4
Total formal votes		17,894	98.3	+0.2
Informal votes		307	1.7	−0.2
Turnout		18,201	97.1	+1.2
United Australia hold		Swing	−1.3	

=== Phillip ===
1938 New South Wales state election: Phillip
Party	Candidate	Votes	%	±%
Labor	Tom Shannon	unopposed		
Labor hold				

=== Raleigh ===
1938 New South Wales state election: Raleigh
Party	Candidate	Votes	%	±%
Country	Roy Vincent	8,659	56.2	−1.3
Independent	Les Jordan	5,429	35.2	+35.2
Labor	John Devine	1,316	8.5	+8.5
Total formal votes		15,404	98.1	−0.2
Informal votes		297	1.9	+0.2
Turnout		15,701	95.1	−0.9
Country hold		Swing	N/A	

- Preferences were not distributed.

=== Randwick ===
1938 New South Wales state election: Randwick
Party	Candidate	Votes	%	±%
United Australia	Arthur Moverly	11,100	56.0	+3.1
Labor	Bob O'Halloran	8,719	44.0	+1.0
Total formal votes		19,819	98.3	−0.1
Informal votes		332	1.7	+0.1
Turnout		20,151	95.8	−0.9
United Australia hold		Swing	N/A	

=== Redfern ===
1938 New South Wales state election: Redfern
Party	Candidate	Votes	%	±%
Labor	William McKell	unopposed		
Labor hold				

=== Ryde ===
1938 New South Wales state election: Ryde
Party	Candidate	Votes	%	±%
United Australia	Eric Spooner	11,669	53.3	−6.0
Labor	James Walsh	5,746	26.3	−14.4
Independent	William Harrison	4,478	20.4	+20.4
Total formal votes		21,893	98.7	+0.6
Informal votes		294	1.3	−0.6
Turnout		22,187	97.0	−0.5
United Australia hold		Swing	N/A	

- Preferences were not distributed.

=== South Coast ===
1938 New South Wales state election: South Coast
Party	Candidate	Votes	%	±%
United Australia	Henry Bate	unopposed		
United Australia hold				

=== Sturt ===
1938 New South Wales state election: Sturt
Party	Candidate	Votes	%	±%
Labor	Ted Horsington	unopposed		
Labor hold				

=== Tamworth ===
1938 New South Wales state election: Tamworth
Party	Candidate	Votes	%	±%
United Australia	Frank Chaffey	8,255	60.0	−15.7
Labor	John Killalea	4,688	34.1	+7.9
Independent	Augustine Logue	804	5.9	+5.9
Total formal votes		13,747	98.5	+0.6
Informal votes		204	1.5	−0.6
Turnout		13,951	96.8	+0.8
United Australia hold		Swing	N/A	

- Preferences were not distributed.

=== Temora ===
1938 New South Wales state election: Temora
Party	Candidate	Votes	%	±%
Country	Doug Dickson	3,225	27.0	−32.3
Country	Hugh Roberton	3,015	25.3	+25.3
Independent	Lancelot Redgrave	2,568	21.5	+21.5
Independent	Alfred Hollande	2,404	20.2	+20.2
Independent	Harold Munro	717	6.0	+6.0
Total formal votes		11,929	95.9	−2.4
Informal votes		513	4.1	+2.4
Turnout		12,442	96.4	+0.5
Two-candidate-preferred result
Country	Doug Dickson	6,618	55.5	−3.8
Independent	Lancelot Redgrave	5,311	44.5	+44.5
Country hold		Swing	N/A	

=== Tenterfield ===
1938 New South Wales state election: Tenterfield
Party	Candidate	Votes	%	±%
Country	Michael Bruxner	7,995	61.9	−38.1
Independent	William McCotter	2,968	23.0	+23.0
Independent	Edward Ogilvie	1,959	15.2	+15.2
Total formal votes		12,922	98.2	
Informal votes		242	1.8	
Turnout		13,164	94.4	
Country hold		Swing	N/A	

- Preferences were not distributed.

=== Upper Hunter ===
1938 New South Wales state election: Upper Hunter
Party	Candidate	Votes	%	±%
Country	Malcolm Brown	unopposed		
Country hold				

=== Vaucluse ===
1938 New South Wales state election: Vaucluse
Party	Candidate	Votes	%	±%
United Australia	Murray Robson	unopposed		
United Australia hold				

William Foster (United Australia) died and Murray Robson had been elected as an Independent candidate at the resulting by-election however he re-joined the United Australia party.

=== Wagga Wagga ===
1938 New South Wales state election: Wagga Wagga
Party	Candidate	Votes	%	±%
Country	Matthew Kilpatrick	8,092	63.1	−0.4
Labor	Eric McKeig	4,734	36.9	+0.4
Total formal votes		12,826	98.5	−0.2
Informal votes		196	1.5	+0.2
Turnout		13,022	95.3	−0.5
Country hold		Swing	−0.4	

=== Waratah ===
1938 New South Wales state election: Waratah
Party	Candidate	Votes	%	±%
Labor	Robert Cameron	16,442	77.8	+19.0
Communist	Robert Cram	4,693	22.2	+13.8
Total formal votes		21.135	94.4	−2.1
Informal votes		1,249	5.6	+2.1
Turnout		22,384	95.9	−0.9
Labor hold		Swing	N/A	

=== Waverley ===
1938 New South Wales state election: Waverley
Party	Candidate	Votes	%	±%
United Australia	John Waddell	10,210	51.4	+1.2
Labor	William Clementson	9,641	48.6	+2.7
Total formal votes		19,851	98.1	−0.2
Informal votes		380	1.9	+0.2
Turnout		20,231	94.9	−0.9
United Australia hold		Swing	N/A	

=== Willoughby ===
1938 New South Wales state election: Willoughby
Party	Candidate	Votes	%	±%
United Australia	Edward Sanders	unopposed		
United Australia hold				

=== Wollondilly ===
1938 New South Wales state election: Wollondilly
Party	Candidate	Votes	%	±%
United Australia	Mark Morton	unopposed		
United Australia hold				

=== Woollahra ===
1938 New South Wales state election: Woollahra
Party	Candidate	Votes	%	±%
United Australia	Vernon Treatt	9,512	53.6	−18.3
United Australia	Arthur Butterell	8,227	46.4	+46.4
Total formal votes		17,739	93.6	−3.2
Informal votes		1,216	6.4	+3.2
Turnout		18,955	91.6	+0.4
United Australia hold		Swing	N/A	

The sitting member Sir Daniel Levy (United Australia) died in 1937. The resulting by-election was won by Harold Mason (Ind. United Australia) however he did not contest the election and the seat was regained by Vernon Treatt (United Australia).

=== Yass ===
1938 New South Wales state election: Yass
Party	Candidate	Votes	%	±%
United Australia	George Ardill	7,074	57.4	−0.4
Independent	Vivian Partridge	5,240	42.6	+42.6
Total formal votes		12,314	98.5	−0.1
Informal votes		186	1.5	+0.1
Turnout		12,500	96.1	−1.0
United Australia hold		Swing	N/A	

=== Young ===
1938 New South Wales state election: Young
Party	Candidate	Votes	%	±%
Country	Albert Reid	7,522	53.9	+0.2
Labor	Reginald Phillips	6,435	46.1	−0.2
Total formal votes		13,957	99.0	+0.3
Informal votes		145	1.0	−0.3
Turnout		14,102	97.3	+0.7
Country hold		Swing	+0.2	

== See also ==
- Candidates of the 1938 New South Wales state election
- Members of the New South Wales Legislative Assembly, 1938–1941
