= Candidates of the 1938 New South Wales state election =

New South Wales state election candidates in 1938

This is a list of candidates for the 1938 New South Wales state election. The election was held on 26 March 1938.

== Retiring members ==
=== United Australia ===
- John Ness (Dulwich Hill)

=== Country ===
- Ernest Buttenshaw (Lachlan)
- Hugh Main (Temora)

=== Independent ===
- Harold Mason (Woollahra)

== Legislative Assembly ==
Sitting members are shown in bold text. Successful candidates are highlighted in the relevant colour.

Electorate	Held by	Labor candidate	Coalition candidate	Other candidates
Albury	United Australia	Edward Jones	**Alexander Mair** (UAP)	
Annandale	Labor	**Bob Gorman**		
Armidale	Country		**David Drummond** (CP)	William Broun (Ind); Charles Hobbs (Ind)
Arncliffe	Labor	**Joseph Cahill**	Ernest Barton (UAP)	
Ashburnham	Country	Edgar Dring	**Hilton Elliott** (CP)	William Gibbons (Ind)
Ashfield	United Australia		**Athol Richardson** (UAP)	Thomas Cavill (Ind)
Auburn	Labor	**Jack Lang**		Jack Hooke (ILP)
Balmain	Labor	**John Quirk**		John O'Carroll (Ind); Thomas Payne (CPA)
Bankstown	Labor	**James McGirr**		
Barwon	Country	Thomas Kane	**Ben Wade** (CP)	
Bathurst	Labor	**Gus Kelly**	Roland Green (CP); Thomas Mutch (UAP)	
Bondi	United Australia	Henry Collins	**Norman Thomas** (UAP)	Richard Brown (Ind); Thomas Hogan (Ind)
Botany	Labor	Francis Kelly		**Bob Heffron** (ILP)
Bulli	Labor	**John Sweeney**		Jack Miles (CPA); Edward Ryan (Ind)
Burwood	United Australia		Harrie Mitchell (UAP)	
Burwood	United Australia		**Gordon Jackett** (UAP)	
Byron	Country		**Arthur Budd** (CP)	Frederick Stuart (Ind)
Canterbury	Labor	**Arthur Tonge**	Edward Hocking (UAP)	
Casino	Country		**John Reid** (CP)	
Castlereagh	Country	Les Murphy	**Alfred Yeo** (CP)	
Cessnock	Labor	**Jack Baddeley**		Eugene O'Neill (ILP)
Clarence	Country		Cecil Wingfield (CP)	
Clarence	Country		**Alfred Henry** (CP)	
Cobar	Labor	**Mat Davidson**		
Concord	United Australia	Leonard Thompson	**Stan Lloyd** (UAP)	
Coogee	United Australia		**John Dunningham** (UAP)	Mark Foots (Ind)
Cootamundra	Country	Ken Hoad	**Bill Ross** (CP)	
Corowa	Independent		Ebenezer Kendell (CP)	**Christopher Lethbridge** (Ind)
Corowa	Independent		Ebenezer Kendell (CP)	Clive Walker (Ind)
Croydon	United Australia		**Bertram Stevens** (UAP)	Garry Gordon (Ind)
Drummoyne	United Australia	Ray Maher	**John Lee** (UAP)	
Dubbo	Country	Leo Taylor	**George Wilson** (CP)	
Dulwich Hill	United Australia	Leslie Morrow	Guy Arkins (UAP)	
Dulwich Hill	United Australia	Leslie Morrow	Ronald McCredie (UAP)	
George's River	United Australia	Albert Kealman	**Cecil Monro** (UAP)	
Glebe	Labor	**Bill Carlton**		Horace Foley (ILP); Bertie Lewis (Ind)
Gloucester	United Australia		**Charles Bennett** (UAP)	Ray Fitzgerald (Ind); Henry Rooke (Ind)
Gordon	United Australia		**Harry Turner** (UAP)	
Gordon	United Australia		William Milne (UAP)	
Goulburn	Labor	**Jack Tully**	Frederick Davies (CP); Peter Loughlin (UAP)	Robert Tatham (Ind)
Granville	United Australia	Bill Lamb	**Claude Fleck** (UAP)	
Hamilton	Labor	**Joshua Arthur**		
Hartley	Labor	**Hamilton Knight**		
Hawkesbury	United Australia		**Bruce Walker Jr** (UAP)	Victor Gillespie (Ind)
Hornsby	United Australia		**James Shand** (UAP)	Howard Miscamble (Ind)
Hornsby	United Australia		William Henson (UAP); Sydney Storey (UAP)	Howard Miscamble (Ind)
Hurstville	United Australia	Michael Croot	**James Webb** (UAP)	
Illawarra	Labor	**Billy Davies**		
King	Labor	**Daniel Clyne**	Rowland Bowen (UAP)	Patrick McDonnell (Ind); Josiah Trenerry (Ind)
Kogarah	United Australia	John Hibberd	**James Ross** (UAP)	John Battye (Ind)
Kurri Kurri	Labor	**George Booth**		
Lachlan	Country	John Grace	Griffith Evans (CP)	George Berry (Ind)
Lachlan	Country	John Grace	John Parker (CP); Charles Thomas (CP)	George Berry (Ind)
Lakemba	Labor	**Fred Stanley**		William Dowe (Ind)
Lane Cove	United Australia		**Herbert FitzSimons**	
Leichhardt	Labor	**Claude Matthews**		Arthur Doughty (Ind); James Dunn (ILP)
Lismore	Country		**William Frith** (CP)	
Liverpool Plains	Country	Thomas Ryan	**Harry Carter** (CP)	
Maitland	United Australia	Walter O'Hearn	**Walter Howarth** (UAP)	
Manly	United Australia		**Alfred Reid** (UAP)	Richard Fitzgerald (Ind)
Manly	United Australia		Robert Miller (UAP); Alfred Seller (UAP)	Richard Fitzgerald (Ind)
Marrickville	Labor	Leslie Balzen	Frederick Rushton (UAP)	**Carlo Lazzarini** (ILP)
Monaro	Country	Clarence Moore	**William Hedges** (CP)	
Mosman	United Australia		**Herbert Lloyd** (UAP)	
Mosman	United Australia		Henry Storey (UAP)	
Mudgee	Labor	**Bill Dunn**	Eric Pye (CP); Reginald Wilson (CP)	
Murray	Country	James Lloyd	**Joe Lawson** (CP)	
Murrumbidgee	Country	George Enticknap	**Robert Hankinson** (CP)	
Namoi	Country	Ernest Hogan	**Colin Sinclair** (CP)	
Nepean	United Australia	John Jackson	**Joseph Jackson** (UAP)	
Nepean	United Australia	John Jackson	Arthur Hebblewhite (UAP)	
Neutral Bay	United Australia		**Reginald Weaver** (UAP)	
Newcastle	Labor	**Frank Hawkins**		Claude Dalby (Ind)
Newtown	Labor	**Frank Burke**		Cyril Glassop (Ind)
North Sydney	United Australia	Henry Clayden	**Hubert Primrose** (UAP)	
Orange	United Australia	Edward McGarry	**Alwyn Tonking** (UAP)	
Oxley	United Australia		**Lewis Martin** (UAP)	George Mitchell (Ind)
Paddington	Labor	**Maurice O'Sullivan**		Lance Sharkey (CPA)
Parramatta	Labor	Albert Rowe	**George Gollan** (UAP)	
Petersham	United Australia	Bill Sheahan	**Eric Solomon** (UAP)	
Phillip	Labor	**Tom Shannon**		
Raleigh	Country	John Devine	**Roy Vincent** (CP)	Les Jordan (Ind)
Randwick	United Australia	Bob O'Halloran	**Arthur Moverly** (UAP)	
Redfern	Labor	**William McKell**		
Ryde	United Australia	James Walsh	**Eric Spooner** (UAP)	William Harrison (Ind)
South Coast	United Australia		**Henry Bate** (UAP)	
Sturt	Labor	**Ted Horsington**		
Tamworth	United Australia	John Killalea	**Frank Chaffey** (UAP)	Augustine Logue (Ind)
Temora	Country		Doug Dickson (CP)	Alfred Holland (Ind); Harold Munro (Ind); Lancelot Redgrave (Ind)
Temora	Country		Hugh Roberton (CP)	Alfred Holland (Ind); Harold Munro (Ind); Lancelot Redgrave (Ind)
Tenterfield	Country		**Michael Bruxner** (CP)	William McCotter (Ind); Edward Ogilvie (Ind)
Upper Hunter	Country		**Malcolm Brown** (CP)	
Vaucluse	United Australia		**Murray Robson** (UAP)	
Wagga Wagga	Country	Eric McKeig	**Matthew Kilpatrick** (CP)	
Waratah	Labor	**Robert Cameron**		Robert Cram (CPA)
Waverley	United Australia	William Clementson	**John Waddell** (UAP)	
Willoughby	United Australia		**Edward Sanders** (UAP)	
Wollondilly	United Australia		**Mark Morton** (UAP)	
Woollahra	United Australia		Vernon Treatt (UAP)	
Woollahra	United Australia		Arthur Butterell (UAP)	
Yass	United Australia		**George Ardill** (UAP)	Vivian Partridge (Ind)
Young	Country	Reginald Phillips	**Albert Reid** (CP)	

== See also ==
- Members of the New South Wales Legislative Assembly, 1938–1941
