= Electoral results for the district of Woollahra =

Election results for Woollahra, New South Wales, Australia

Woollahra, an electoral district of the Legislative Assembly in the Australian state of New South Wales, had two incarnations, from 1894 to 1920 and from 1927 to 1962.

Election	Member	Party
1894	Adrian Knox	Ind. Free Trade
1895	Adrian Knox	Free Trade
1898	John Garland	Free Trade
1901	William Latimer	Liberal Reform
1904	William Latimer	Liberal Reform
1907	William Latimer	Liberal Reform
1910	William Latimer	Liberal Reform
1913	William Latimer	Liberal Reform
1917	William Latimer	Nationalist
Election	Member	Party
1927	Maurice O'Sullivan	Labor
1930	Sir Daniel Levy	Nationalist
1932	Sir Daniel Levy	United Australia
1935	Sir Daniel Levy	United Australia
1937 by	Harold Mason	Ind. United Australia
1938	Vernon Treatt	United Australia
1941	Vernon Treatt	United Australia
1944	Vernon Treatt	Democratic
1947	Vernon Treatt	Liberal
1950	Vernon Treatt	Liberal
1953	Vernon Treatt	Liberal
1956	Vernon Treatt	Liberal
1959	Vernon Treatt	Liberal

== Election results ==
=== Elections in the 1950s ===
==== 1959 ====
1959 New South Wales state election: Woollahra
Party	Candidate	Votes	%	±%
Liberal	Vernon Treatt	unopposed		
Liberal hold				

==== 1956 ====
1956 New South Wales state election: Woollahra
Party	Candidate	Votes	%	±%
Liberal	Vernon Treatt	14,592	70.8	+3.2
Independent	George Mason	6,007	29.2	+29.2
Total formal votes		20,599	95.3	−2.3
Informal votes		1,010	4.7	+2.3
Turnout		21,609	87.7	−0.7
Liberal hold		Swing	N/A	

==== 1953 ====
1953 New South Wales state election: Woollahra
Party	Candidate	Votes	%	±%
Liberal	Vernon Treatt	15,203	67.6	
Labor	Norman Jacobs	7,283	32.4	
Total formal votes		22,486	97.6	
Informal votes		546	2.4	
Turnout		23,032	88.4	
Liberal hold		Swing		

==== 1950 ====
1950 New South Wales state election: Woollahra
Party	Candidate	Votes	%	±%
Liberal	Vernon Treatt	14,595	76.1	
Labor	William Harcourt	4,587	23.9	
Total formal votes		19,182	98.3	
Informal votes		324	1.7	
Turnout		19,506	87.7	
Liberal hold		Swing		

=== Elections in the 1940s ===
==== 1947 ====
1947 New South Wales state election: Woollahra
Party	Candidate	Votes	%	±%
Liberal	Vernon Treatt	19,332	69.7	+19.2
Labor	John Nolan	8,385	30.3	+30.3
Total formal votes		27,717	98.2	+1.5
Informal votes		508	1.8	−1.5
Turnout		28,225	90.1	+0.3
Liberal hold		Swing	N/A	

==== 1944 ====
1944 New South Wales state election: Woollahra
Party	Candidate	Votes	%	±%
Democratic	Vernon Treatt	12,173	50.5	−17.2
Independent	Reg Bartley	7,248	30.1	+30.1
Independent Labor	Norman Jackson	4,682	19.4	+19.4
Total formal votes		24,103	96.7	−0.6
Informal votes		824	3.3	+0.6
Turnout		24,927	89.8	+3.7
Democratic hold		Swing	N/A	

- Preferences were not distributed.

==== 1941 ====
1941 New South Wales state election: Woollahra
Party	Candidate	Votes	%	±%
United Australia	Vernon Treatt	15,010	67.7	
Labor	Jack Wright	7,168	32.3	
Total formal votes		22,178	97.3	
Informal votes		607	2.7	
Turnout		22,785	86.1	
United Australia hold		Swing		

=== Elections in the 1930s ===
==== 1938 ====
1938 New South Wales state election: Woollahra
Party	Candidate	Votes	%	±%
United Australia	Vernon Treatt	9,512	53.6	−18.3
United Australia	Arthur Butterell	8,227	46.4	+46.4
Total formal votes		17,739	93.6	−3.2
Informal votes		1,216	6.4	+3.2
Turnout		18,955	91.6	+0.4
United Australia hold		Swing	N/A	

The sitting member Sir Daniel Levy (United Australia) died in 1937. The resulting by-election was won by Harold Mason (Ind. United Australia) however he did not contest the election and the seat was regained by Vernon Treatt (United Australia).

==== 1937 by-election ====
1937 Woollahra by-election Saturday 26 June
Party	Candidate	Votes	%	±%
United Australia	George Grant	6,686	46.3	−25.6
Ind. United Australia	Harold Mason	6,173	42.7	
Ind. United Australia	George McDonald	1,595	11.0	
Total formal votes		14,644	96.1	−0.7
Informal votes		585	3.9	+0.7
Turnout		15,038	80.5	−10.7
Two-candidate-preferred result
Ind. United Australia	Harold Mason	7,331	50.7	
United Australia	George Grant	7,123	49.3	−22.6
Ind. United Australia gain from United Australia		Swing	N/A	

The by-election was caused by the death of Sir Daniel Levy (United Australia).

==== 1935 ====
1935 New South Wales state election: Woollahra
Party	Candidate	Votes	%	±%
United Australia	Daniel Levy	11,900	71.9	−3.6
Independent	Rupert Beale	4,660	28.1	+28.1
Total formal votes		16,560	96.8	−1.5
Informal votes		555	3.2	+1.5
Turnout		17,115	91.2	−1.8
United Australia hold		Swing	N/A	

==== 1932 ====
1932 New South Wales state election: Woollahra
Party	Candidate	Votes	%	±%
United Australia	Daniel Levy	13,182	75.5	+16.4
Labor (NSW)	Robert Stapleton	4,279	24.5	−6.7
Total formal votes		17,461	98.3	+0.6
Informal votes		296	1.7	−0.6
Turnout		17,757	93.0	+5.9
United Australia hold		Swing	N/A	

==== 1930 ====
1930 New South Wales state election: Woollahra
Party	Candidate	Votes	%	±%
Nationalist	Daniel Levy	9,185	59.1	
Labor	Thomas Hodge	4,847	31.2	
Australian	John Waddell	1,520	9.8	
Total formal votes		15,552	97.7	
Informal votes		364	2.3	
Turnout		15,916	87.1	
Nationalist hold		Swing		

=== Elections in the 1920s ===
==== 1927 ====
1927 New South Wales state election: Woollahra
Party	Candidate	Votes	%	±%
Labor	Maurice O'Sullivan	6,589	51.4	
Nationalist	Frederick Davison	5,263	41.0	
Independent Labor	Septimus Alldis (defeated)	974	7.6	
Total formal votes		12,826	98.6	
Informal votes		175	1.4	
Turnout		13,001	84.0	
Labor win		(new seat)		

District recreated

==== 1920 - 1927 ====
District abolished

=== Elections in the 1910s ===
==== 1917 ====
1917 New South Wales state election: Woollahra
Party	Candidate	Votes	%	±%
Nationalist	William Latimer	3,925	56.4	+11.8
Labor	Chester Davies	3,034	43.6	+9.6
Total formal votes		6,959	98.9	−0.1
Informal votes		76	1.1	+0.1
Turnout		7,035	63.9	−4.1
Nationalist hold		Swing	+6.2	

==== 1913 ====
1913 New South Wales state election: Woollahra
Party	Candidate	Votes	%	±%
Liberal Reform	William Latimer	3,552	44.6	
Labor	Daniel Dwyer	2,707	34.0	
Independent Liberal	Philip Morton	1,226	15.4	
Independent Labor	Francis Cowling	475	6.0	
Total formal votes		7,960	99.0	
Informal votes		80	1.0	
Turnout		8,040	68.0	

1913 New South Wales state election: Woollahra - Second Round Saturday 13 December
Party	Candidate	Votes	%	±%
Liberal Reform	William Latimer	4,058	50.2	
Labor	Daniel Dwyer	4,020	49.8	
Total formal votes		8,078	99.5	
Informal votes		38	0.5	
Turnout		8,116	68.6	
Liberal Reform hold				

==== 1910 ====
1910 New South Wales state election: Woollahra
Party	Candidate	Votes	%	±%
Liberal Reform	William Latimer	3,657	56.0	
Labour	James McCarthy	2,776	42.5	
Independent	Leo Robinson	99	1.5	
Total formal votes		6,532	98.8	
Informal votes		77	1.2	
Turnout		6,609	69.7	
Liberal Reform hold				

=== Elections in the 1900s ===
==== 1907 ====
1907 New South Wales state election: Woollahra
Party	Candidate	Votes	%	±%
Liberal Reform	William Latimer	3,072	70.2	
Labour	Robert Usher	1,306	29.8	
Total formal votes		4,378	96.7	
Informal votes		149	3.3	
Turnout		4,527	55.3	
Liberal Reform hold				

==== 1904 ====
1904 New South Wales state election: Woollahra
Party	Candidate	Votes	%	±%
Liberal Reform	William Latimer	2,272	74.5	
Independent	Robert Usher	776	25.5	
Total formal votes		3,048	98.6	
Informal votes		43	1.4	
Turnout		3,091	39.0	
Liberal Reform hold				

Woollahra lost part of the seat to Waverley and was expanded to include part of Paddington. William Latimer (Liberal Reform) was the member for Woollahra. The member for Paddington was Charles Oakes (Liberal Reform) who successfully contested that seat.

==== 1901 ====
1901 New South Wales state election: Woollahra
Party	Candidate	Votes	%	±%
Independent Liberal	William Latimer	1,041	56.3	+37.1
Liberal Reform	John Garland	809	43.7	−2.9
Total formal votes		1,850	100.0	+0.3
Informal votes		0	0.0	−0.3
Turnout		1,850	61.0	+0.9
Independent Liberal gain from Liberal Reform				

=== Elections in the 1890s ===
==== 1898 ====
1898 New South Wales colonial election: Woollahra
Party	Candidate	Votes	%	±%
Free Trade	John Garland	650	46.7	
National Federal	William Manning	476	34.2	
Ind. Free Trade	William Latimer	267	19.2	
Total formal votes		1,393	99.7	
Informal votes		4	0.3	
Turnout		1,397	60.1	
Free Trade hold				

==== 1895 ====
1895 New South Wales colonial election: Woollahra
Party	Candidate	Votes	%	±%
Free Trade	Adrian Knox	769	65.6	
Ind. Protectionist	John Gannon	324	27.6	
Ind. Free Trade	William Harding	80	6.8	
Total formal votes		1,173	99.2	
Informal votes		10	0.9	
Turnout		1,183	54.9	
Free Trade hold				

==== 1894 ====
1894 New South Wales colonial election: Woollahra
Party	Candidate	Votes	%	±%
Ind. Free Trade	Adrian Knox	885	50.4	
Free Trade	John Neild	538	30.6	
Labour	Philip Moses	334	19.0	
Total formal votes		1,757	99.9	
Informal votes		1	0.1	
Turnout		1,758	83.4	
Ind. Free Trade win		(new seat)		
