= Members of the New South Wales Legislative Assembly, 1938–1941 =

Members of the New South Wales Legislative Assembly who served in the 32nd parliament held their seats from 1938 to 1941. They were elected at the 1938 state election, and at by-elections. The Speaker was Reginald Weaver.

Name	Party	Electorate	Term in office
George Ardill	United Australia	Yass	1930–1941
Guy Arkins	United Australia	Dulwich Hill	1915–1930, 1938–1941
Joshua Arthur	Labor	Hamilton	1935–1953
Jack Baddeley	Labor	Cessnock	1922–1949
Henry Bate	United Australia	South Coast	1926–1941
Jeff Bate (Note: Wollondilly MLA Mark Morton died on 28 September 1938. UAP candidate Jeff Bate, the son of South Coast MLA Henry Bate won the resulting by-election on 12 November.)	United Australia	Wollondilly	1938–1949
Charles Bennett (Note: 10 United Australia members crossed the floor to censure Stevens ministry for proposals to cut government spending in order to restrain a growing deficit.)	United Australia	Gloucester	1934–1941
George Booth	Labor	Kurri Kurri	1925–1960
Malcolm Brown (Note: Upper Hunter Country MLA Malcolm Brown died on 29 August 1939. Country Party candidate D'Arcy Rose won the resulting by-election on 7 October.)	Country	Upper Hunter	1931–1939
Michael Bruxner	Country	Tenterfield	1920–1962
Arthur Budd	Country	Byron	1927–1944
Frank Burke (Note: Labor MLA Frank Burke (Newtown) resigned from the Labor Party and joined the Industrial Labor Party in June 1939.) (Note: Industrial Labor was readmitted into the Labor Party at a unity conference on 26 August 1939.)	Labor/Industrial Labor/Labor	Newtown	1917–1944
Joseph Cahill	Labor	Arncliffe	1925–1959
Robert Cameron	Labor	Waratah	1927–1956
Bill Carlton	Labor	Glebe	1935–1941
Harry Carter	Country	Liverpool Plains	1927–1941
Bill Chaffey (Note: Tamworth UAP MLA Frank Chaffey died on 9 July 1940. His son UAP candidate Bill Chaffey won the resulting by-election on 10 August.)	United Australia	Tamworth	1940–1973
Frank Chaffey	United Australia	Tamworth	1913–1940
Daniel Clyne	Labor	King	1927–1956
Mat Davidson (Note: Two Labor MLAs, Mat Davidson (Cobar), and Ted Horsington (Sturt) resigned from the Labor Party and joined the Industrial Labor Party in April 1939.)	Labor/Industrial Labor/Labor	Cobar	1918–1949
Billy Davies	Labor	Illawarra	1917–1949
Doug Dickson	Country	Temora	1938–1960
John Dunningham (Note: Coogee MLA John Dunningham died on 26 May 1938. UAP candidate Thomas Mutch won the resulting by-election on 25 June.)	United Australia	Coogee	1928–1938
David Drummond	Country	Armidale	1920–1949
Bill Dunn	Labor	Mudgee	1910–1911, 1911–1932, 1935–1950
Hilton Elliott	Country	Ashburnham	1932–1941
Griffith Evans	Country	Lachlan	1938–1943
Clive Evatt (Note: Hurstville UAP MLA James Webb died on 14 February 1939. Industrial Labor Party candidate Clive Evatt won the resulting by-election on 18 March.)	Industrial Labor/Labor	Hurstville	1939–1959
Herbert FitzSimons	United Australia	Lane Cove	1930–1944
William Frith	Country	Lismore	1933–1953
George Gollan	United Australia	Parramatta	1932–1953
Bob Gorman (Note: Nine Labor MLAs – Jack Lang (Auburn), Bob Gorman (Annandale), Bill Lamb (Granville), Claude Matthews (Leichhardt), James McGirr (Bankstown), Mary Quirk (Balmain), Tom Shannon (Phillip), Fred Stanley (Lakemba) and Arthur Tonge (Canterbury), left the Labor Party in 1940 to form the Australian Labor Party (Non-Communist), in the second of the Lang Labor splits. They rejoined the party in 1941, following a federal intervention in the NSW branch to remove the influence of Communist sympathisers on the state executive.)	Labor/Labor (N-C)/Labor	Annandale	1933–1950
Robert Hankinson	Country	Murrumbidgee	1932–1941
Frank Hawkins	Labor	Newcastle	1935–1968
William Hedges	United Australia	Monaro	1927–1941
Roy Heferen (Note: Barwon Country MLA Ben Wade resigned to unsuccessfully contest the federal seat of Gwydir at the 1940 election. Labor candidate Roy Heferen won the by-election on 25 October.)	Labor	Barwon	1940– 1950
Robert Heffron	Industrial Labor/Labor	Botany	1930–1968
Ted Horsington	Labor/Industrial Labor/Labor	Sturt	1922–1947
Walter Howarth	United Australia	Maitland	1932–1956
David Hunter (Note: Croydon UAP MLA Bertram Stevens resigned to unsuccessfully contest the federal seat of Lang at the 1940 election. UAP candidate David Hunter won the by-election on 7 September.)	United Australia	Croydon	1940–1976
Joseph Jackson	United Australia	Nepean	1922–1956
Matthew Kilpatrick	Country	Wagga Wagga	1920–1941
Gus Kelly	Labor	Bathurst	1925–1932, 1935–1967
Hamilton Knight	Labor	Hartley	1927–1947
Bill Lamb	Labor/Labor (N-C)/Labor	Granville	1938–1962
Jack Lang	Labor/Labor (N-C)/Labor	Auburn	1913–1943, 1943–1946
Joe Lawson	Country	Murray	1932–1973
Carlo Lazzarini	Industrial Labor/Labor	Marrickville	1917–1952
John Lee	United Australia	Drummoyne	1920–1927, 1941–1947
Christopher Lethbridge	Independent	Corowa	1937–1946
Herbert Lloyd	United Australia	Mosman	1929–1941
Stan Lloyd	United Australia	Concord	1932–1941
Alexander Mair	United Australia	Albury	1932–1946
Clarrie Martin (Note: Waverley UAP MLA John Waddell died on 15 March 1939. Industrial Labor Party candidate Clarrie Martin won the resulting by-election on 22 April.)	Industrial Labor/Labor	Waverley	1930–1932, 1939–1953
Lewis Martin	United Australia	Oxley	1927–1941
Claude Matthews	Labor/Labor (N-C)/Labor	Leichhardt	1934–1954
James McGirr	Labor/Labor (N-C)/Labor	Bankstown	1922–1952
William McKell	Labor	Redfern	1917–1947
Harrie Mitchell	United Australia	Burwood	1938–1941
Cecil Monro	United Australia	Georges River	1932–1941, 1950–1953
Mark Morton	United Australia	Wollondilly	1901–1920, 1922–1938
Arthur Moverly	United Australia	Randwick	1932–1941
Thomas Mutch	United Australia	Coogee	1917–1930, 1938–1941
Maurice O'Sullivan	Labor	Paddington	1927–1959
Hubert Primrose	United Australia	North Sydney	1932–1941
John Quirk (Note: Balmain MLA John Quirk died on 13 December 1938. His wife Labor candidate Mary Quirk won the resulting by-election on 14 January 1939.)	Labor	Balmain	1917–1938
Mary Quirk	Labor/Labor (N-C)/Labor	Balmain	1939–1950
Albert Reid	Country	Young	1927–1930, 1932–1941
Alfred Reid	United Australia	Manly	1920–1922, 1925–1945
John Reid	Country	Casino	1930–1953
Athol Richardson	United Australia	Ashfield	1935–1946, 1946–1952
Murray Robson	United Australia	Vaucluse	1936–1957
D'Arcy Rose	Country	Upper Hunter	1939–1959
Bill Ross	Country	Cootamundra	1932–1941
James Ross	United Australia	Kogarah	1932–1941
Edward Sanders	United Australia	Willoughby	1925–1943
James Shand	United Australia	Hornsby	1926–1944
Tom Shannon	Labor/Labor (N-C)/Labor	Phillip	1927–1954
Colin Sinclair	Country	Namoi	1932–1941
Eric Solomon	United Australia	Petersham	1932–1941
Eric Spooner (Note: Ryde UAP MLA Eric Spooner resigned to successfully contest the federal seat of Robertson at the 1940 election. Labor candidate Arthur Williams won the by-election on 14 September.)	United Australia	Ryde	1932–1940
Fred Stanley	Labor/Labor (N-C)/Labor	Lakemba	1927–1950
Bertram Stevens	United Australia	Croydon	1927–1940
John Sweeney	Labor	Bulli	1933–1947
Norman Thomas	United Australia	Bondi	1932–1941
Arthur Tonge	Labor/Labor (N-C)/Labor	Canterbury	1926–1932, 1935–1962
Alwyn Tonking	United Australia	Orange	1932–1941
Vernon Treatt	United Australia	Woollahra	1938–1962
Jack Tully	Labor	Goulburn	1925–1932, 1935–1946
Harry Turner (Note: Gordon UAP MLA Harry Turner's election victory was overturned by the Court of Disputed Returns on 25 August 1938. He won the resulting by-election on 24 September.)	United Australia	Gordon	1937–1952
Roy Vincent	Country	Raleigh	1922–1953
John Waddell	United Australia	Waverley	1932–1939
Ben Wade	Country	Barwon	1932–1940
Bruce Walker Jr	United Australia	Hawkesbury	1932–1941
Reginald Weaver	United Australia	Neutral Bay	1917–1925, 1927–1945
James Webb	United Australia	Hurstville	1932–1939
Arthur Williams	Labor	Ryde	1940–1956
George Wilson	Country	Dubbo	1932–1942
Cecil Wingfield	Country	Clarence	1938–1955
Alfred Yeo	Country	Castlereagh	1932–1941

== See also ==
- Third Stevens ministry
- Mair ministry
- Results of the 1938 New South Wales state election
- Candidates of the 1938 New South Wales state election
