= 1939 Waverley state by-election =

Election result for Waverley, New South Wales, Australia

The 1939 Waverley state by-election was held on 22 April 1939 for the New South Wales Legislative Assembly electorate of Waverley because of the death of John Waddell (United Australia).

== Dates ==
Date	Event
15 March 1939	Death of John Waddell.
24 March 1939	Writ of election issued by the Speaker of the Legislative Assembly.
3 April 1939	Nominations
22 April 1939	Polling day
5 May 1939	Return of writ

== Result ==
1939 Waverley by-election Saturday 22 April
Party	Candidate	Votes	%	±%
Industrial Labor	Clarrie Martin	6,397	34.8	
United Australia	Ella Waddell (Note: Ella Waddell was the widow of former member John Waddell.)	6,539	34.6	−16.8
Labor	James Ormonde	5,630	30.6	−18.0
Total formal votes		18,386	98.0	−0.1
Informal votes		370	2.0	+0.1
Turnout		18,756	93.0	−1.9
Two-party-preferred result
Industrial Labor	Clarrie Martin	10,477	56.8	
United Australia	Ella Waddell	7,939	43.2	−8.2
Industrial Labor gain from United Australia		Swing	N/A	

== See also ==
- Electoral results for the district of Waverley
- List of New South Wales state by-elections
