= 1896 Waverley colonial by-election =

← 1895	20 February 1896	1898 →

Electoral district of Waverley in the New South Wales Legislative Assembly
- Registered: 2,242 (Note: Estimate based on a roll of 2,242 at the 1895 election.)
- Turnout: 62.2% (▼2.2)
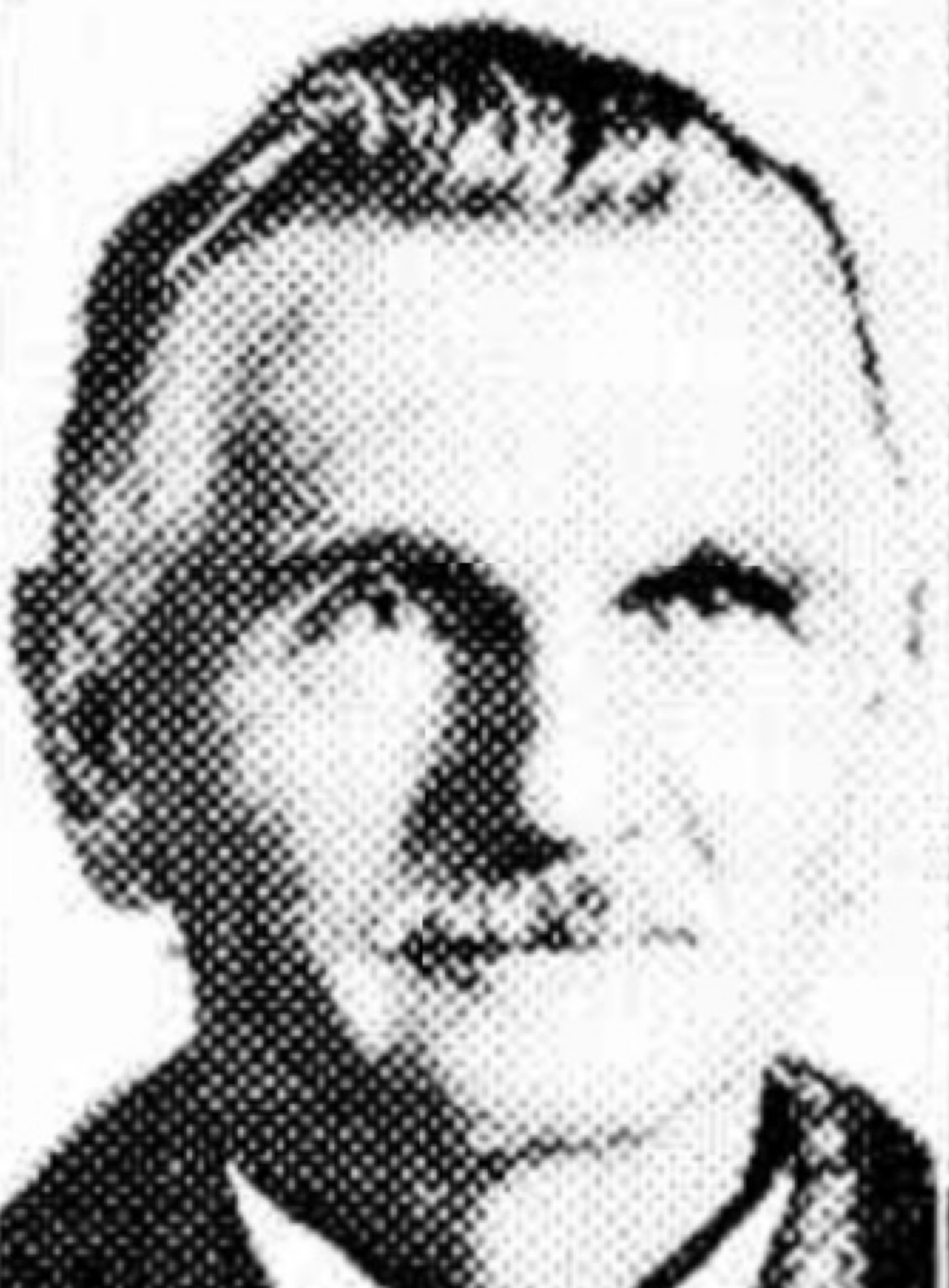

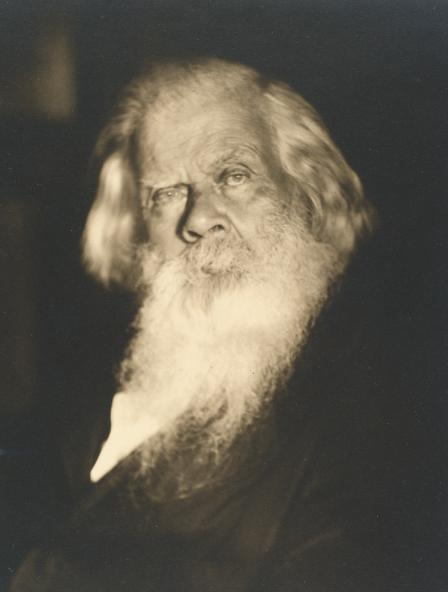
	First party	Second party	Third party
		PRO
Candidate	Thomas Jessep	Thomas Barlow	Sir Henry Parkes
Party	Free Trade	Protectionist	Independent
Popular vote	698	528	160
Percentage	50.4%	38.1%	11.5%
Swing	▲6.9	▲5.5	▲11.5
MP before election
Angus Cameron
Free Trade
Elected MP
Thomas Jessep
Free Trade

The 1896 Waverley colonial by-election was held on 20 February 1896 to elect the member for Waverley in the New South Wales Legislative Assembly, following the death of Free Trade MP Angus Cameron.

Thomas Jessep retained the seat for the Free Trade Party with a swing of 6.9% against Protectionist candidate Thomas Barlow and former premier Sir Henry Parkes, who contested the election as an independent. This was the last election contested by Parkes before his death 67 days later on 27 April 1896.

== Key dates ==
- 26 January 1896 – Angus Cameron died
- 10 February 1896 – Writ of election issued by the Speaker of the Legislative Assembly
- 18 February 1896 – Candidate nominations
- 20 February 1896 – Polling day
- 2 March 1896 – Return of writ

== Candidates ==
Party	Candidate	Background
Protectionist	Thomas Barlow	Candidate for Waverley in 1894 and 1895
Free Trade	Thomas Jessep	Alderman on Sydney City Council
Independent	Sir Henry Parkes	Premier of New South Wales during five non-consecutive terrms between 1872 and 1891

== Result ==
1896 Waverley colonial by-election
Party	Candidate	Votes	%	±%
Free Trade	Thomas Jessep	698	50.4	+6.9
Protectionist	Thomas Barlow	528	38.1	+5.5
Independent	Sir Henry Parkes	160	11.5	+11.5
Total formal votes		1,386	99.4	+0.1
Informal votes		9	0.7	−0.2
Turnout		1,395	62.2	−2.2
Free Trade hold				

== See also ==
- Electoral results for the district of Waverley
- List of New South Wales state by-elections
