= 1953 Waverley state by-election =

Election result for Waverley, New South Wales, Australia

A by-election was held for the New South Wales Legislative Assembly electorate of Waverley on 31 October 1953 because of the death of Clarrie Martin (Labor).

== Dates ==
| Date | Event |
|---|---|
| 5 September 1953 | Clarrie Martin died. |
| 30 September 1953 | Writ of election issued by the Speaker of the Legislative Assembly. |
| 13 October 1953 | Day of nomination |
| 31 October 1953 | Polling day |
| 20 November 1953 | Return of writ |

== Result ==
1953 Waverley by-election Saturday 31 October
| Party | Candidate | Votes | % | ±% |
|---|---|---|---|---|
| Labor | William Ferguson | 11,284 | 61.0 | −7.5 |
| Liberal | Ben Doig | 6,678 | 36.1 | +4.6 |
| Independent | Edward Maher | 539 | 2.9 | |
| Total formal votes | | 18,501 | 98.2 | +0.3 |
| Informal votes | | 338 | 1.8 | −0.3 |
| Turnout | | 18,839 | 81.7 | −9.3 |
| Labor hold | | Swing | | |

- Preferences were not distributed.

== See also ==
- Electoral results for the district of Waverley
- List of New South Wales state by-elections
