= James Ormonde (Australian politician) =

Scottish-born Australian politician (1903–1970)

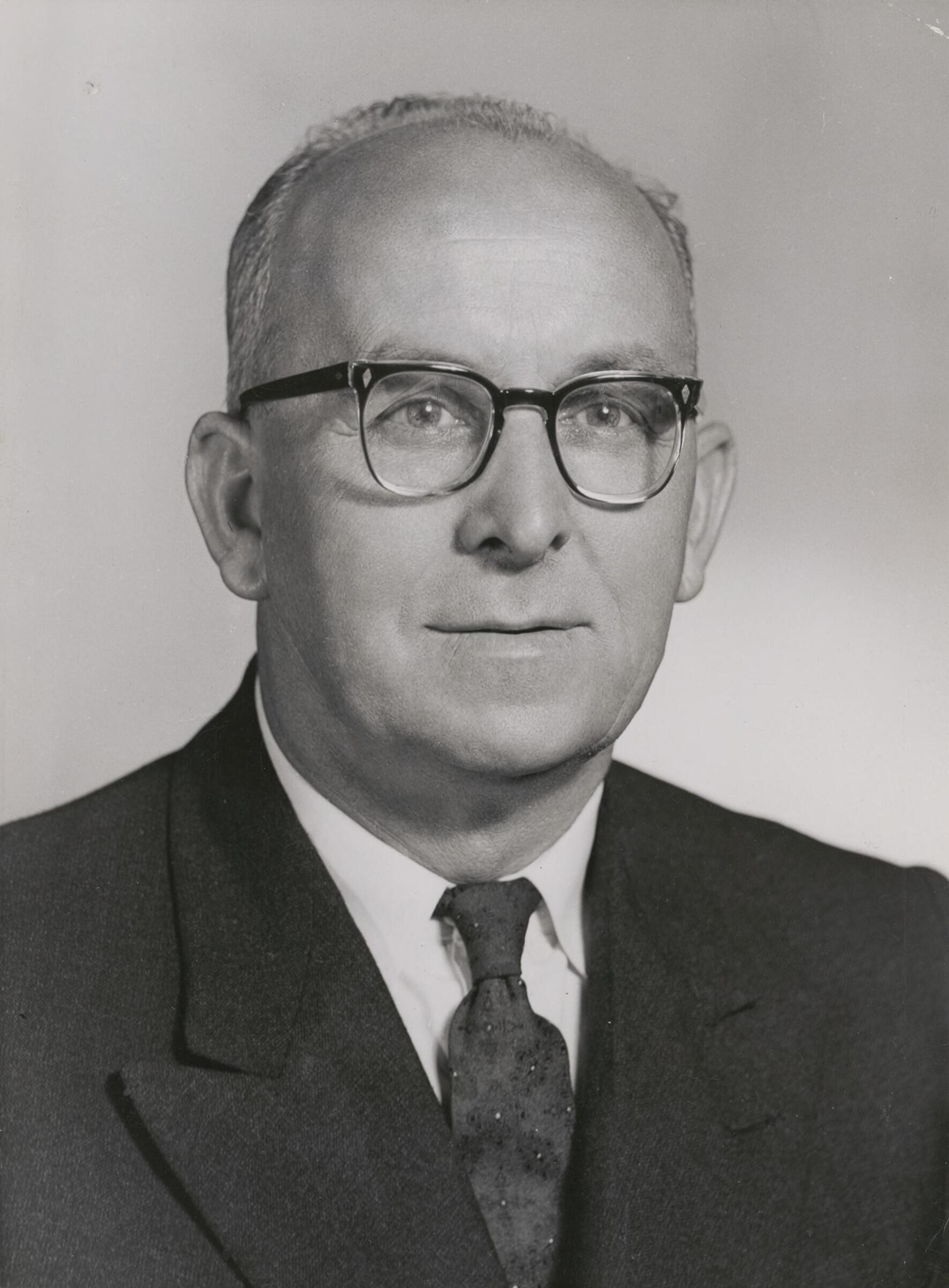

Senator for New South Wales
- In office 1 July 1959 – 30 November 1970
- Succeeded by: Jim McClelland
- In office 30 July 1958 – 21 November 1958
- Preceded by: Bill Ashley
- Succeeded by: Colin McKellar

Personal details
- Born: 23 March 1903 Kirkcaldy, Fife, Scotland
- Died: 30 November 1970 (aged 67) Darlinghurst, New South Wales, Australia
- Party: Labor
- Other political affiliations: Lang Labor (1930s)
- Spouse: Margaret May Fraser (m. 1927)
- Children: Paul Ormonde (son)
- Occupation: Miner; Journalist

James Patrick Ormonde (23 March 1903 – 30 November 1970) was a Scottish-born Australian politician. Born in Fife, he migrated to Australia as a child and was educated at Catholic schools in Maitland, New South Wales. He became a journalist first with the Labor Daily and then with the Sydney Morning Herald. In 1958, he was appointed to the Australian Senate as a Labor Senator for New South Wales, filling the casual vacancy resulting from the death of Labor Senator Bill Ashley. He was re-elected in the 1958 election, but the remainder of Ashley's term was filled by Colin McKellar; thus, Ormonde was not a Senator between 22 November 1958 and 1 July 1959. He remained in the Senate until his retirement in 1970; however, he died before his retirement took effect in 1971 and Jim McClelland, who had been elected to replace him, filled the vacancy.

== Early life ==
Ormonde was born on 23 March 1901 in Kirkcaldy, Scotland. He was the son of Bridget (née Reilly) and Jeremiah Ormonde.

Ormonde moved to Australia as a small child, where his father found work as a coal miner in Kurri Kurri, New South Wales. He was educated at Marist Brothers College, West Maitland. He left school at the age of fourteen and joined his father at the Pelaw Main colliery.

== Journalism ==
Joining the ALP at a young age, Ormonde began his career in journalism with the Labor Daily, initially as a delivery man before becoming a writer. In 1944, he succeeded Les Haylen as editor of the Standard Weekly, the official ALP newspaper in New South Wales. As editor he "attempted to capture the attention of the Labor faithful by adopting a lively, popular tone, with plenty of emphasis on sport".

== Politics ==
=== Early candidacies ===
Ormonde was initially associated with Lang Labor and stood unsuccessfully for the party in the Division of Wentworth at the 1934 federal election. He was also an unsuccessful candidate at the 1939 Waverley state by-election for the New South Wales Legislative Assembly, losing to Clarrie Martin of the Industrial Labor Party in a defeat which signaled the end of Lang's control over the ALP.

=== Senate ===
In December 1957, Ormonde won ALP preselection for the party's Senate ticket in New South Wales at the 1958 federal election. He was appointed to the Senate on 30 July 1958 to fill a casual vacancy occasioned by the death of Bill Ashley, with Ashley's term expiring on the date of the election. Ormonde was elected to a full six-year term at the election, commencing on 1 July 1959. He won a second term at the 1964 election, where he became the first Australian politician to poll over one million votes.

== Personal life ==
Ormonde married Margaret Fraser in 1927, with whom he had four children. His son Paul followed him into the journalism profession. During the 1930s the family lived in poverty and frequently stayed in boardinghouses, but they were eventually able to buy a house in Eastwood.

Ormonde died on 30 November 1970 at Hughlings Private Hospital in Darlinghurst, New South Wales, aged 67. He had been in poor health for several months.
