= 1937 Woollahra state by-election =

Election result for Woollahra, New South Wales, Australia

A by-election was held for the New South Wales Legislative Assembly electorate of Woollahra on 26 June 1937 because of the death of Sir Daniel Levy (United Australia).

== Dates ==
Date	Event
20 May 1937	Sir Daniel Levy died.
2 June 1937	Writ of election issued by the Speaker of the Legislative Assembly.
14 June 1937	Nominations
26 June 1937	Polling day
9 July 1937	Return of writ

== Result ==
1937 Woollahra by-election]] Saturday 26 June
Party	Candidate	Votes	%	±%
United Australia	George Grant	6,686	46.3	−25.6
Ind. United Australia	Harold Mason	6,173	42.7	
Ind. United Australia	George McDonald	1,595	11.0	
Total formal votes		14,454	96.1	−0.7
Informal votes		584	3.9	+0.7
Turnout		15,038	80.5	−10.7
Two-candidate-preferred result
Ind. United Australia	Harold Mason	7,331	50.7	
United Australia	George Grant	7,123	49.3	−22.6
Ind. United Australia gain from United Australia		Swing	N/A	

== Aftermath ==
Harold Mason did not serve long, retiring at the general election on 26 March 1938.

== See also ==
- Electoral results for the district of Woollahra
- List of New South Wales state by-elections
