= Paul Ormonde =

Australian journalist and author (1931–2022)

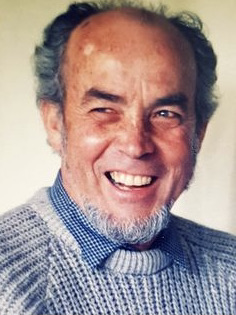
- Paul Ormonde ca. 1975
- Born: Paul Ormonde; 7 February 1931; Sydney
- Died: 20 December 2022 (aged 91)
- Occupations: Journalist and author
- Writing career
- Notable works: The Movement (1972); Santamaria (2000); A Foolish Passionate Man (1984); Daniel Mannix (1984)

Paul Ormonde (7 February 1931 – 20 December 2022) was an Australian journalist, social and religious activist, and author. Born in Sydney, Ormonde experienced the challenges of the Great Depression and the Second World War during his formative years. Growing up in a society where survival relied on mutual assistance, he witnessed firsthand the hardships endured by those living in extreme poverty. These experiences instilled in him a deep sense of hospitality, generosity, and kindness towards others, following the example of his generous parents.

Ormonde embarked on his journalistic career in the early 1950s, initially working for The Daily Telegraph in Sydney before later relocating to Melbourne. Throughout his life, he contributed to major newspapers in Victoria and New South Wales, along with various other newspapers, publications, and periodicals.

Inspired by his father's political endeavors as a senator for New South Wales, Ormonde became actively involved with the Australian Catholic Worker, a controversial Catholic leftist publication. He served as a commentator and member of the editorial committee, channeling his passion for social and religious issues. Additionally, he authored several significant books documenting the societal and religious landscape of the 1960s and 1970s.

== Early life ==
Ormonde was born in Sydney to James Patrick Ormonde and Margaret May Ormonde (née Fraser). His father served as a New South Wales senator from 1958 until his death in 1970. Ormonde's early years were shaped by the challenges of the Great Depression and the Second World War. He grew up in a society where survival depended on mutual assistance, witnessing firsthand the hardships faced by people living in extreme poverty. Despite their own limited means, Ormonde's parents, especially his mother, displayed remarkable generosity by providing food and shelter to both relatives and strangers during the Depression and the war. These experiences, coupled with his Catholic upbringing, instilled in Ormonde a strong sense of hospitality, generosity, and kindness towards others. These qualities remained with him throughout his life.

Ormonde received his education at St Patrick's Christian Brothers in Strathfield, Sydney. Coming from a family of journalists and Australian Labor Party activists, he was surrounded by discussions centered on politics and social justice. His family held a deep social conscience and felt a moral obligation to pursue fairness and equality. Ormonde's father initially supported Jack Lang and the Lang Labor party but switched his allegiance to the anti-Lang faction of the Labor Party in 1939. Inspired by his father's profession, Ormonde also pursued a career in journalism. At the age of 28, he witnessed his father's election to the Senate.

== Journalistic career ==
Ormonde embarked on a career in journalism during the early 1950s, undergoing training at The Daily Telegraph in Sydney. He later relocated to Melbourne, where he held various roles as a reporter, sub-editor, and feature writer for the Sun News-Pictorial and The Herald.

Paul Ormonde married Marie Kilmartin, a fellow reporter and activist, in 1955.

In the 1960s, he briefly served as the public relations officer for Radio Australia before returning to newspaper journalism.

A significant portion of his political and religious writings found a platform in the Catholic Worker, an independent lay journal. From 1959 onwards, he became a member of the editorial committee, forming lifelong friendships with his fellow collaborators. Inspired by the New York-based Catholic Worker movement founded by Dorothy Day, The Australian Catholic Worker tackled and deliberated upon the prominent issues in social and religious history during the 1960s. These topics included the Vietnam War, Birth control, Clerical celibacy in the Catholic Church, women's ordination and equality, poverty, and the evils of excessive capitalism.

Notably, within the Catholic community, there was a passionate and intense debate surrounding the tactics and beliefs of "The Movement", spearheaded by the Catholic intellectual B. A. Santamaria. Ormonde's exposé of The Movement's strategies invited fierce attacks from its members and Catholics who subscribed to its objectives and methods. Paul Ormonde remained actively involved with the Catholic Worker group until the journal ceased publication in 1976. His published works reflected the prevailing issues of that era.

In 1967, he assumed the role of the founding chairman of Pax Christi, an organization of Catholics dedicated to formulating peace and war policies that often clashed with the prevailing views of church authorities in Australia. Following the 1968 convention of Pax Christi, he edited and contributed to the book Catholics in Revolution.

In subsequent years, he continued writing articles for the Jesuit publication Eureka Street and Online Catholics.

=== Public relations work ===
Between 1982 and 1992 he was head of public affairs for Carlton & United Breweries. On leaving CUB he set up his own public relations consultancy.

=== Semi-retirement ===
Since 1992 he has concentrated on commissioned reviews and commentaries, particularly for The Age, and The Sydney Morning Herald. Notable subjects during this period include articles on the life of the melbourne publisher Lloyd O'Neil (founder: Lansdowne Press), on the Catholic intellectual Niall Brennan, the correspondence of B.A. Santamaria (2007) and Jeffrey Archer's book The Gospel According to Judas (2007).

=== Tribute ===
Following his death, his journalist son Tom Ormonde paid tribute to his father, describing him as someone

with an extraordinary ability to make others feel acknowledged and listened to. This remarkable quality, along with his deeply held values, nurtured and inspired his children, friends, and anyone fortunate enough to have known him.

== Books ==
Ormonde is the author of a number of books, including:

The Movement

DESCRIPTION:(The Movement) "saved Australia" from the "red menace", fought the "yellow peril", started the rift that split the Labor Party and the Catholic Church, turned layman against Bishop, and caused the greatest scandal in the history of Catholicism in Australia. This body of Catholics, acting with the moral and financial support of the bishops, secretly operated in one of the country's largest political parties and most of the country's major industrial unions. The movement damaged the credibility of the Church and the condition of Australian democracy.

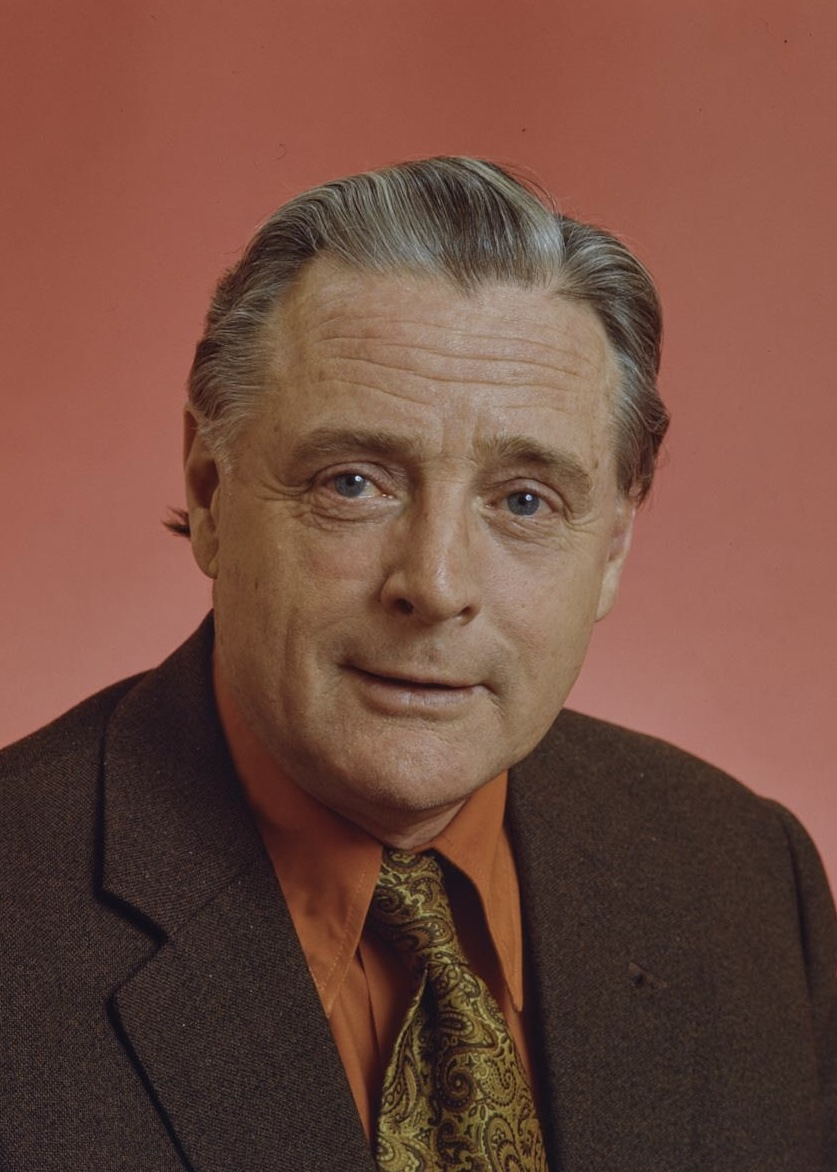
Jim Cairns

A Foolish Passionate Man (biography of Jim Cairns)

DESCRIPTION: James Ford Cairns (4 October 1914 - 12 October 2003), Australian politician, was prominent in the Labor movement through the 1960s and 1970s, and was briefly Deputy Prime Minister in the Whitlam government. He is best remembered as a leader of the movement against Australian involvement in the Vietnam War, for his affair with Junie Morosi and for his later renunciation of conventional politics. He was also a prominent economist, and a prolific writer on economic and social issues.

Santamaria: The Politics of Fear (Paul Ormonde Ed.)

DESCRIPTION: Santamaria's whole life was a testimony to his belief that the ways of the world – whether with invincible military might, twisted propaganda, or the manipulation of people's most bigoted fears and prejudices – provided the only realistic defence of Catholic truth, as he understood it, against worldly enemies.

'Daniel Mannix, Beyond the Myths'

Ormonde edited the book and wrote the last chapter of James Griffin's:

DESCRIPTION: (This) biography is unique for exposing the Archbishop's human flaws, previously avoided or brushed over by other biographers. Giving Mannix credit for his many achievements, Griffin analyses controversies such as conscription in the Great War, State Aid for Catholic schools and his association with entrepreneur John Wren.
