= Carl Glasgow =

Australian politician and lawyer

Carl S.F. Glasgow
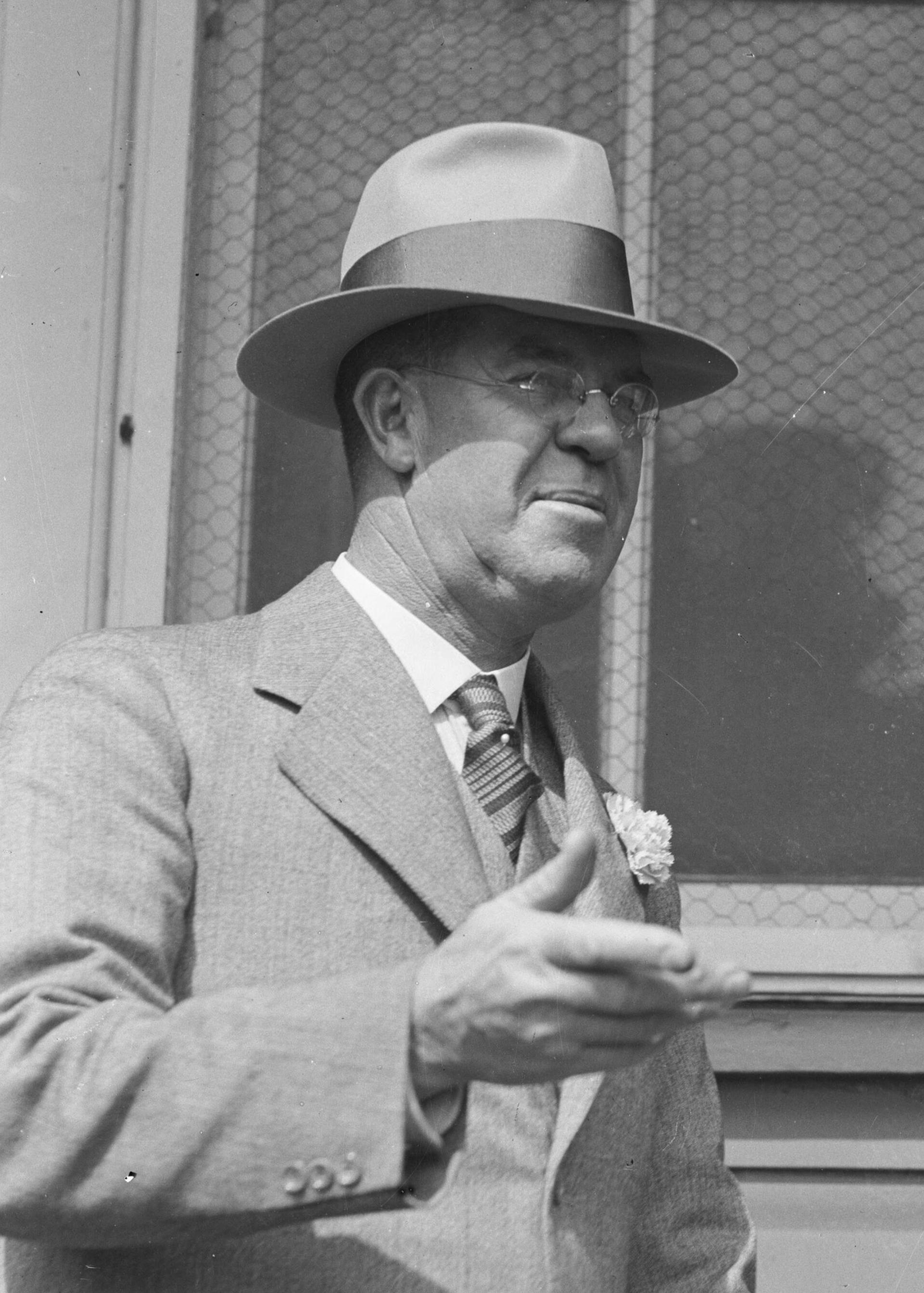

Member of the New South Wales Legislative Council
- In office 8 October 1927 – 18 September 1930

Personal details
- Born: 2 April 1883 Narrandera, New South Wales
- Died: 25 December 1954 (aged 71) Royal Sydney Golf Club, Rose Bay, New South Wales
- Party: Nationalist Party
- Spouse(s): Sara Maria McCracken (m. 1907) (d.1918) Elsa Marie Duval (m. 1920)
- Parents: William Henry Glasgow (father); Rebecca Jane Glasgow (née Ross) (mother)
- Education: Newington College

Carl Spencer Frederick Glasgow (2 April 1883 – 25 December 1954) was an Australian Member of Parliament and lawyer.

== Early life ==
Glasgow was born in Narrandera, New South Wales, the son of William Henry Glasgow and Rebecca Jane Ross. He attended Newington College (1896–1899) and was articled in 1900.

== Legal career ==
From 1904 he was a legal clerk in Narrandera and after a period as a managing clerk in Sydney he was admitted as a solicitor in 1912. Glasgow worked with Kershaw, Matthews and Lane from 1913 until 1920 and after becoming a partner the firm was known as Kershaw, Matthews, Lane and Glasgow from 1920 until 1954.

== Political service ==
In local government, Glasgow served as an alderman on Waverley Council from 1914 until 1915. He was elected the National Party member for Waverley in the NSW Legislative Assembly on 8 October 1927 and served until 18 September 1930. He explained to the citizens of his home town in Narandera that he had a temporary breakdown and thought it wise not to go on with his political career.

== Community activities ==
Glasgow was a Freemason and a prominent Odd Fellow, becoming Grand Sire of Australasia and representing Australia at a world conference in the United States of America in 1925. He was president of New South Wales Friendly Societies Association from 1913 until 1915.

== Later life ==
He married Sara Maria McCracken in 1907 and had a daughter (Jean) and two sons (Roy and Keith). Sara Glasgow died in 1918. In 1920 he married Elsa Marie Duval and had three daughters (Barbara, Betty and Pat). Glasgow served as president of the Old Newingtonians' Union in 1929 and 1930. His second wife, Elsa, was president of the Ex-students' Union of St Catherine's School, Waverley.

Glasgow died at Royal Sydney Golf Club, Rose Bay, New South Wales, where he had been a member for many years. His funeral was held at Waverley Methodist Church and the Eastern Suburbs Crematorium. His ashes are buried with his two wives at Waverley Cemetery.

New South Wales Legislative Assembly
Preceded by New District	Member for Waverley; 1927 – 1930	Succeeded by William Clementson
