= William Clementson =

Australian politician (1884–1982)

William Alfred Clementson (19 July 1884 – 19 August 1982) was an Australian politician. He was a Labor Party member of the New South Wales Legislative Assembly from 1930 to 1932, representing the electorate of Waverley.

Clementson was born at Chippendale, and was educated to primary level before becoming a pastoral worker. He began working as a tram driver in 1909, and later worked as a transport inspector. He was an active trade unionist, serving on the executive of the Australian Tramway and Motor Omnibus Employees' Association from 1912 until 1929 and serving as its federal vice-president for a time. He was also involved within the Labor Party, serving as branch president and secretary, and serving on its state executive from 1927 until 1929.

Clementson built his family home at 1 Want Street Mascot in 1918 and lived there until his death. He and his wife had two daughters and two sons.

Clementson entered state politics amidst the landslide Labor win at the 1930 election, when he won the seat of Waverley, defeating Guy Arkins, the Nationalist MLA for abolished Rockdale. His parliamentary career would be short-lived; he was easily defeated by United Australia Party candidate John Waddell at the 1932 election. He again contested Waverley in 1935 and 1938, but was defeated by Waddell both times.

Later in life, he was a member of the Railway Superannuation Board, serving from 1941 until 1960. He died in 1982 at Mascot.

New South Wales Legislative Assembly
Preceded by Carl Glasgow	Member for Waverley; 1930 – 1932	Succeeded by John Waddell
