= William Latimer (Australian politician) =

Australian politician

William Fleming Latimer (1858 – 21 July 1935) was an Irish-born Australian politician.

He was born in Enniskillen in County Fermanagh, Ireland, to farmer William Latimer and Sarah Ann Fleming. He attended the Erasmus Smith school near Florencecourt and was then apprenticed to a softgoods trader at the age of fifteen. After his apprenticeship was complete he worked in Glasgow for two years and then in Dublin before managing a large warehouse in Northern Ireland in 1880. In 1882 he arrived in Sydney. He married Charlotte Creighton on 23 September 1884; they had three children. He worked at Perry and Company until he assumed control of the Woollahra branch of the business in 1886. He subsequently served as a Woollahra alderman from 1897 to 1928, as mayor from 1900 to 1910 and 1918 to 1920. In 1901 he was elected to the New South Wales Legislative Assembly, representing Woollahra as a Liberal. In 1920, with the introduction of proportional representation leading to his seat's abolition, Latimer was appointed to the New South Wales Legislative Council. He remained there until changes in the Council led to the removal of lifetime appointments in 1934. Latimer died the following year in Sydney.

New South Wales Legislative Assembly
Preceded by John Garland	Member for Woollahra; 1901–1920	Abolished
