= Thomas Jessep =

Australian politician (c.1848–1916)

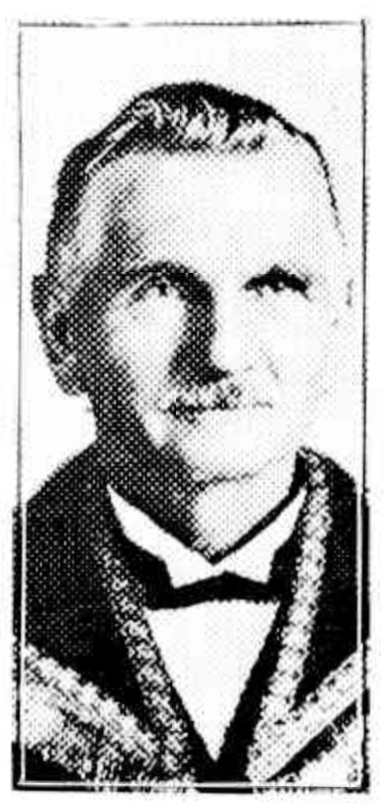
Thomas Jessep

Thomas Jessep (c. 1848 – 7 November 1916) was an Australian politician.

He was born in Gooderstone in Norfolk to farmer Thomas Jessep and Jane Cooper. He arrived in Tasmania as a child in 1854 and worked at an orchard. In 1866 he went to Ballarat to dig for gold, but was unsuccessful and moved to Sydney in 1869, becoming a fruitseller. On 10 April 1873 he married Louisa Drury at Surry Hills; they would have eight children. Following the establishment of his own fruit business, he became a foundation member and the first chairman of the New South Wales Fruit Exchange Co-operative Company. He was a Waverley Municipal Council alderman from 1889 to 1892 and served on Sydney City Council from 1893 to 1900. In 1896 he was elected to the New South Wales Legislative Assembly as the Free Trade member for Waverley. He served as a backbencher until his defeat in 1907. Jessep died at Waverley in 1916.

New South Wales Legislative Assembly
Preceded by Angus Cameron	Member for Waverley; 1896–1907	Succeeded by James Macarthur-Onslow
