= 1938 New South Wales state election =

| ← 1935 | 26 March 1938 | 1941 → |

All 90 seats in the New South Wales Legislative Assembly 46 Assembly seats were needed for a majority
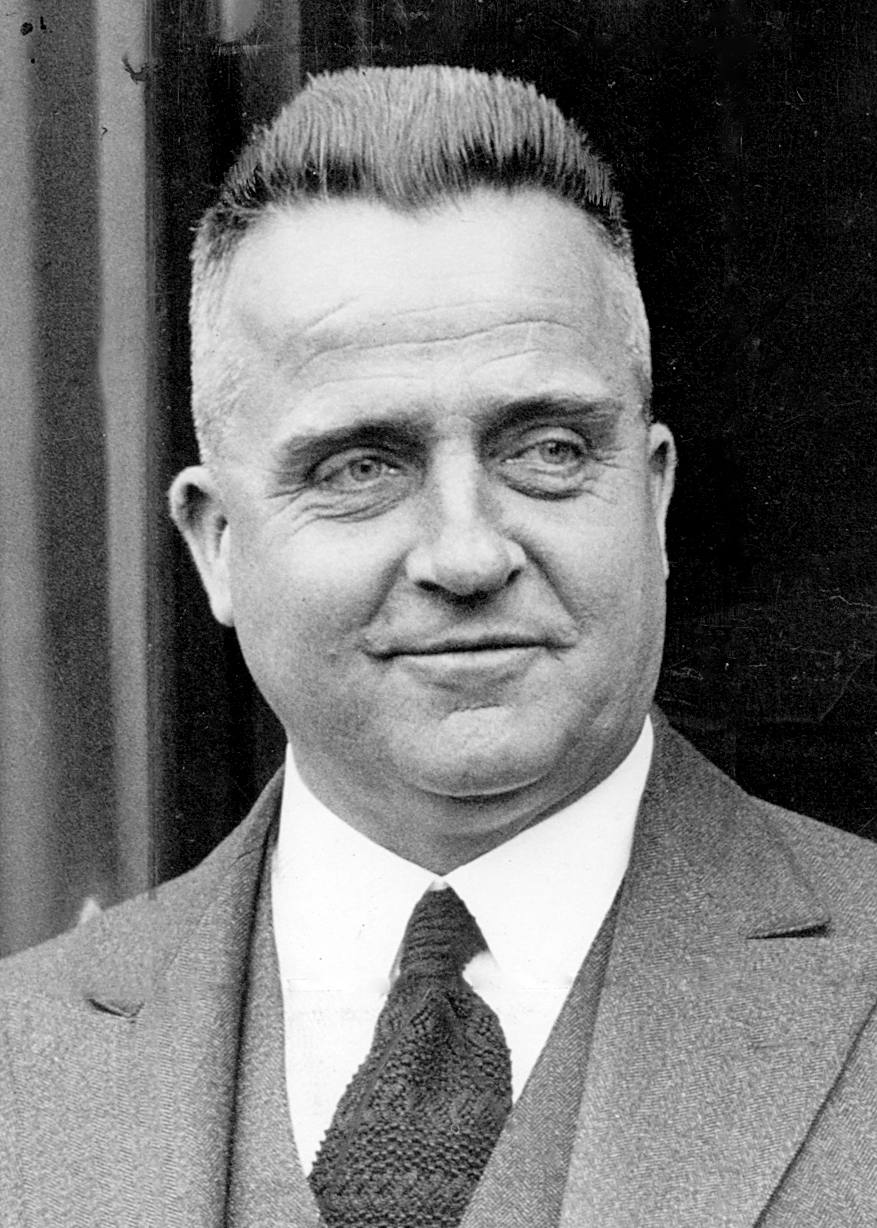

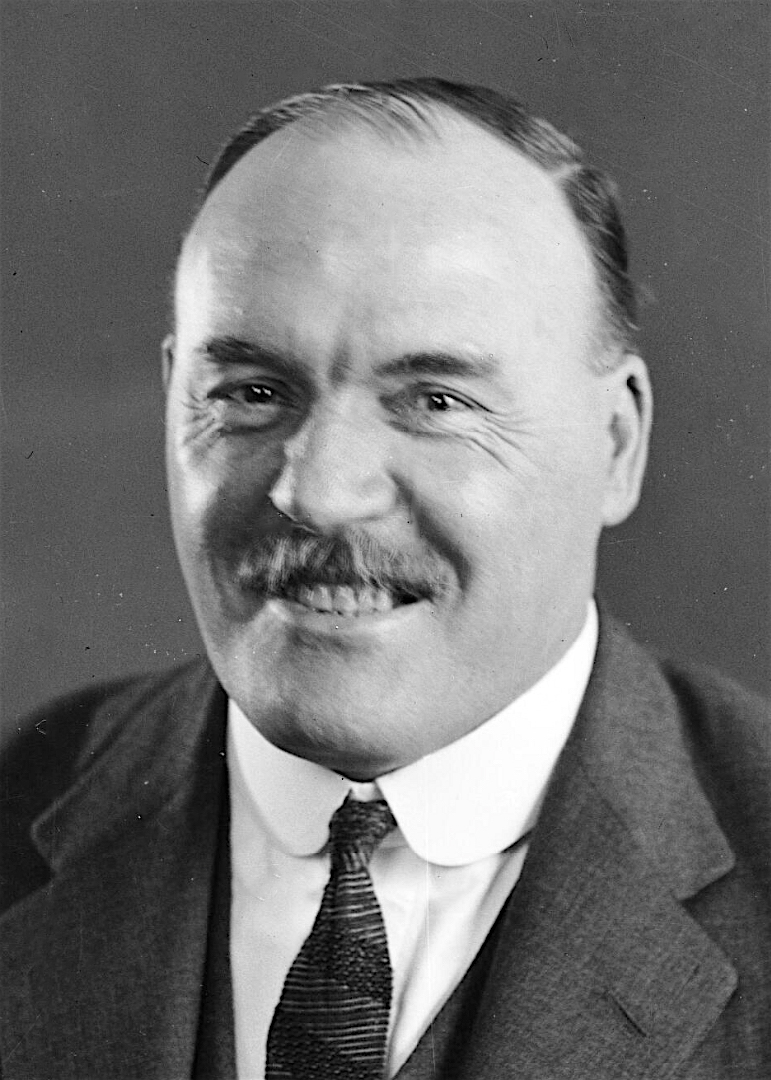

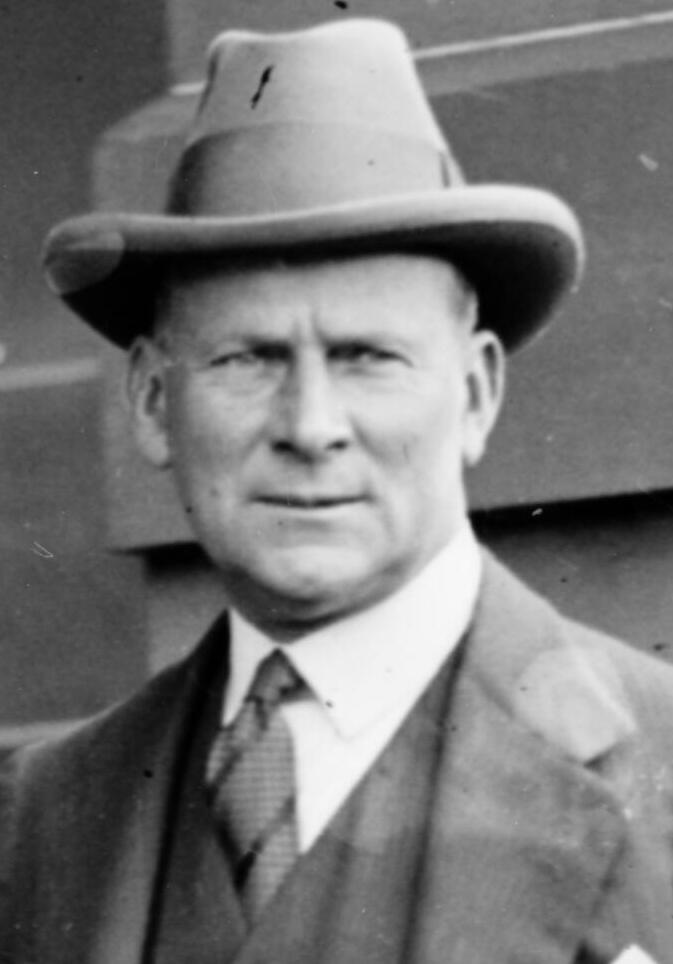
| | First party | Second party | Third party |
|---|---|---|---|
| Leader | Bertram Stevens | Jack Lang | Michael Bruxner |
| Party | United Australia | Labor | Country |
| Leader since | 5 April 1932 | 31 July 1923 | 27 April 1932 |
| Leader's seat | Croydon | Auburn | Tenterfield |
| Last election | 38 seats | 29 seats | 23 seats |
| Seats won | 37 | 28 | 22 |
| Seat change | ▼1 | ▼1 | ▼1 |
| Popular vote | 424,275 | 412,063 | 164,045 |
| Percentage | 35.86% | 34.82% | 13.86% |
| Swing | ▲2.76 | ▼7.60 | ▲0.94% |
- Results by division for the Legislative Assembly, shaded by winning party's margin of victory.
Premier before election
Bertram Stevens
UAP/Country coalition
Elected Premier
Bertram Stevens
UAP/Country coalition

The 1938 New South Wales state election was held on 26 March 1938. This election was for all of the 90 seats in the 32nd New South Wales Legislative Assembly and was conducted in single member constituencies with compulsory preferential voting.

The result of the election was:

- United Australia Party 37 seats
- Country Party 22 seats
- Australian Labor Party 28 seats
- Industrial Labor Party 2 seats
- Independent 1 seat.

The UAP/Country Party coalition of Bertram Stevens and Michael Bruxner had a majority of 28 (down 2). Stevens continued as Premier until 5 August 1939 when he resigned after being censured by the Legislative Assembly, with 10 United Australia members crossing the floor. He was replaced as Premier by Alexander Mair.

Lang Labor reconciled with Labor in February 1936, however Labor's primary vote continued to decline. Labor's continued poor showing in this election was seen as evidence of Jack Lang's inability to appeal to the middle ground of the electorate. As a result, moves to dispose Lang intensified. The Industrial Labor Party led by Lang rival Bob Heffron was re-absorbed into the Labor on 26 August 1939 and Lang was replaced as party leader by William McKell on 5 September 1939.

During this parliament Labor and Industrial Labor each won 2 by-elections from the United Australia Party. This reduced the Government's majority to 20 when the parliament was dissolved.

== Key dates ==
| Date | Event |
|---|---|
| 24 February 1938 | The Legislative Assembly was dissolved, and writs were issued by the Governor to proceed with an election. |
| 4 March 1938 | Nominations for candidates for the election closed at noon. |
| 26 March 1938 | Polling day. |
| 13 April 1938 | Third Stevens–Bruxner ministry sworn in. |
| 26 April 1938 | The writs were returned and the results formally declared. |
| 12 April 1938 | Opening of 32nd Parliament. |

== Results ==
New South Wales state election, 26 March 1938 Legislative Assembly << 1935–1941 >>
| Enrolled voters | 1,607,833 (Note: A total of 19 electorates (six UAP, three Country, and ten Labor) were uncontested, representing 338,853 voters.) | | | | |
| Votes cast | 1,183,257 | | Turnout | 95.79 | –0.27 |
| Informal votes | 32,237 | | Informal | 2.65 | –0.39 |
Summary of votes by party
| Party | Primary votes | % | Swing | Seats | Change |
| United Australia | 424,275 | 35.86 | +2.76 | 37 | – 1 |
| Labor | 412,063 | 34.82 | –7.60 | 28 | –1 |
| Country | 164,045 | 13.86 | +0.94 | 22 | –1 |
| Industrial Labor | 43,735 | 3.70 | +3.70 | 2 | +2 |
| Communist | 10,386 | 0.88 | –0.6 | 0 | ±0 |
| Independents | 128,753 | 10.88 | +6.4 | 1 | +1 |
| Total | 1,183,257 | | | 90 | |

Popular vote
| United | 35.86% |
| Labor | 34.82% |
| Country | 13.86% |
| Industrial Labor | 3.7% |
| Independents | 6.4% |
Parliamentary seats
| United | 37 |
| Labor | 28 |
| Country | 22 |
| Industrial Labor | 2 |
| Independents | 1 |

== Retiring members ==
=== United Australia ===
- John Ness (Dulwich Hill)

=== Country ===
- Ernest Buttenshaw (Lachlan)
- Hugh Main (Temora)

=== Independent ===
- Harold Mason (Woollahra)

== Changing seats ==
Seats changing hands
| Seat | 1935 | | 1938 | |
| Seat | Party | Member | Member | Party |
|---|---|---|---|---|
| Botany | Labor | Bob Heffron | Bob Heffron (Note: Bob Heffron (Botany) and Carlo Lazzarini (Marrickville) were expelled from Labor in 1936 and formed the Industrial Labor Party.) | Industrial Labor |
| Corowa | Country | Richard Ball (Note: Richard Ball (Country) died and Christopher Lethbridge (Independent) won the resulting by-election, retaining the seat at this election.) | Christopher Lethbridge | Independent |
| Granville | United Australia | Claude Fleck | Bill Lamb | Labor |
| Marrickville | Labor | Carlo Lazzarini | Carlo Lazzarini | Industrial Labor |

The member for Woollahra, Sir Daniel Levy (United Australia), died in 1937. The resulting by-election was won by Harold Mason (Ind. United Australia) however he did not contest the election and the seat was regained by Vernon Treatt (United Australia).

== See also ==
- Members of the New South Wales Legislative Assembly, 1938–1941
- Candidates of the 1938 New South Wales state election
