= Harold Harvey Mason =

Australian politician (1890–1949)

Harold Mason KC

Member of the New South Wales Parliament for Woollahra
- In office 26 June 1937 – 24 February 1938
- Preceded by: Sir Daniel Levy
- Succeeded by: Vernon Treatt

Personal details
- Born: 28 January 1890 Hunters Hill, New South Wales, Australia
- Died: 8 May 1949 (aged 59) Australian Capital Territory, Australia
- Party: Independent UAP
- Spouse: Marjorie Macken (m. 1914)
- Relations: Anthony Mason (nephew)
- Education: University of Sydney
- Profession: Barrister

Harold Harvey Mason KC (28 January 1890 – 8 May 1949) was an Australian barrister and politician. He was a member of the New South Wales Legislative Assembly from 1937 to 1938, representing the seat of Woollahra as an independent aligned with the United Australia Party (UAP).

== Early life ==
Mason was born on 28 January 1890 in Hunters Hill, New South Wales. He was the son of Sarah Jane (née Dunn) and William Henry Mason; his father was a shipping master at the Port of Sydney.

Mason attended Fort Street High School and went on to the University of Sydney, graduating Bachelor of Laws in 1913 with first-class honours.

== Legal career ==
Mason served his articles of clerkship with George Crichton Smith and was called to the New South Wales Bar in 1913. He was an associate to judge A. H. Simpson of the Supreme Court of New South Wales.

As a barrister, Mason practised primarily in equity and bankruptcy. In 1915, he and Claude Weston published Precedents in Equity, later regarded as the first leading textbook on equity in New South Wales. He was appointed King's Counsel in 1934.

Mason frequently appeared before the High Court of Australia and the Judicial Committee of the Privy Council on appeals cases. In 1936, he attracted attention as the first Australian barrister to fly to England to appear in an appeal before the Privy Council. He also represented in several challenges to national security regulations during World War II.

== Politics ==
Mason was elected to the New South Wales Legislative Assembly at a 1937 by-election for the seat of Woollahra, following the death of Daniel Levy. He was a member of the United Australia Party (UAP) and proclaimed himself as a supporter of the government of UAP premier Bertram Stevens, but at the by-election stood as an independent in opposition to the endorsed UAP candidate.

Mason regarded his victory as a vote against preselection, the process by which only a single endorsed candidate would be nominated by the UAP prior to the election. Following his election, the UAP state council determined that Mason should not be admitted to the parliamentary party, with Stevens stating that "the nature of the campaign being conducted by Mr. Mason puts him outside the pale of the party". Mason subsequently joined the parliamentary crossbench.

Mason opted not to re-contest Woollahra at the 1938 state election, stating "another term in the House would be a waste of time".

== Personal life ==
In 1914, Mason married Marjorie Macken, with whom he had four children. His nephew Anthony Mason followed him into the legal profession and became chief justice of Australia.

Outside of politics and the law, Mason served as a director of Sydney department store Mark Foy's. He was also the owner of "Spring Valley", a grazing property of 2,000 acres (810 ha) located in the Molonglo Valley section of the Australian Capital Territory. At the time of his death, there were approximately 1,900 sheep on the property.

Mason died on 8 May 1949 after falling about 100 feet (30 m) over a cliff above the Molonglo River. His body was recovered by a search party the following day, after he was reported missing. A coronial inquest concluded the fall was accidental and occurred after he "slipped in a soft patch of soil on the cliff-top immediately above the spot where his body was found".

Mason was interred at the Northern Suburbs Crematorium. His estate was valued for probate at £67,105 (equivalent to $3,910,000 in 2022).

New South Wales Legislative Assembly
Preceded by Sir Daniel Levy	Member for Woollahra; 1937–1938	Succeeded by Vernon Treatt
