= Clarrie Martin =

Australian politician (1900–1953)

Major The Honourable Clarrie Martin QC
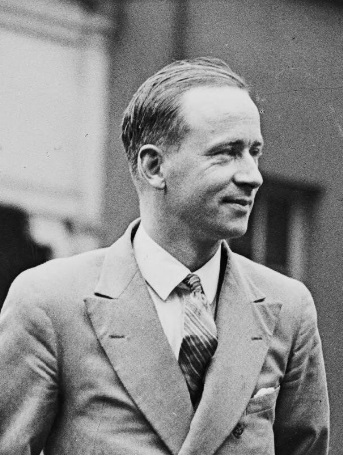

36th Attorney General of New South Wales
- In office 16 May 1941 – 23 February 1953
- Premier: William McKell; James McGirr; Joseph Cahill
- Preceded by: Sir Henry Manning
- Succeeded by: Bill Sheahan

Personal details
- Born: 10 February 1900 Ballarat, Colony of Victoria
- Died: 5 September 1953 (aged 53) Centennial Park, New South Wales, Australia
- Party: Australian Labor Party (New South Wales Branch); Australian Labor Party (NSW); Industrial Labor Party
- Spouse(s): Janet Wrightson (m.1933–1953; his death)
- Education: University of Sydney (B.Ec. 1923, M.Ec. 1932, LL.B. 1936)

Military service
- Allegiance: Australia
- Branch/service: Australian Army
- Years of service: 1942–1945
- Rank: Major
- Unit: 2nd AIF; Combined Operational Services Command
- Battles/wars: Second World War; New Guinea Campaign

Major Clarence Edward Martin QC (2 February 1900 – 5 September 1953) was an Australian politician and a member of the New South Wales Legislative Assembly from 1930 until 1932 and from 1939 until his death in 1953. He was variously a member of the Australian Labor Party (NSW), the Industrial Labor Party and the Labor Party (ALP). He was the Attorney General of New South Wales from 1941 until 1953 and also held the position of Minister for Transport for six months prior to his death.

== Early life ==
Martin was born in Ballarat, Victoria and was the son of a miner. He was educated at state schools in Broken Hill, New South Wales and was orphaned at an early age. He initially worked in the Broken Hill mines but continued his education privately. At age 17 he moved to Sydney, underwent teacher training and taught in state schools in rural NSW while continuing part-time studies in economics at the University of Sydney. During the period he was out of parliament he studied law at the university. Martin graduated and was called to the bar on the motion of Richard Windeyer in 1936, in 1952 he was appointed a Queen's Counsel. He was the founder of the NSW branch of the Fabian Society and a trustee of the State Library of New South Wales. He served in the Second Australian Imperial Force in New Guinea and the Middle East for 4 years and reached the rank of Major.

== State Parliament ==
Martin entered the New South Wales Parliament at the 1930 state election as the labor member for Young. He defeated the sitting Country Party member Albert Reid and his victory helped Labor form a government under Premier Jack Lang. However, he was defeated in the 1932 landslide that ended Lang's premiership. During his time as the member for Young, Martin was active in forming and working with the Socialisation Units of the ALP. These Units promoted a transition to "socialism in our time" in the midst of the Depression crisis, which led him into conflict with Lang and his followers.

By the mid-1930s, while still out of Parliament, he was a recognised leader of the left-wing forces inside the ALP. He was a supporter of rebel union-backed Labor Party, the Industrial Labor Party, and stood as their candidate at the by-election caused by the death of the United Australia Party member for Waverley, John Waddell. His victory and that of Clive Evatt in a by-election in Hurstville were seen as evidence of Lang's declining power.

Within a few months of Martin's entry into parliament, the Industrial Labor Party was re-admitted into the ALP caucus and Lang was replaced as leader by William McKell. The Federal Executive of the Labor Party intervened in the NSW Branch to convene a unity conference, which effectively removed Lang and his followers from control.

== Government ==
With the election of the Labor government of William McKell at the 1941 election, Martin was appointed as the Attorney-General. In September 1949, the serving Deputy Premier, Jack Baddeley, announced his retirement from parliament and Martin stood to succeed him as deputy. At the caucus meeting on 21 September, Martin was defeated in his bid by the Secretary for Public Works and Local Government, Joseph Cahill, 21 votes to 20, but took on the new cabinet post of Minister for Co-operative Societies.

Cahill bested Martin again when James McGirr announced his resignation as premier on the grounds of ill health on 1 April 1952. At the caucus meeting on 3 April Cahill defeated Martin 32 votes to 14 for the office of Premier.

He remained Attorney General until 1953 when illness caused him to take the less hectic post of Minister for Transport.

New South Wales Legislative Assembly
| Preceded by Albert Reid | Member for Young; 1930 – 1932 | Succeeded by Albert Reid |
| Preceded by John Waddell | Member for Waverley; 1939 – 1953 | Succeeded by William Ferguson |
Political offices
| Preceded by Sir Henry Manning | Attorney General of New South Wales; 1941 – 1953 | Succeeded by Bill Sheahan |
| New title | Minister for Co-operative Societies; 1949 – 1950 | Succeeded by Clive Evatt |
| Preceded by Bill Sheahan | Minister for Transport; 1953 | Succeeded by Joseph Cahill |
