= Industrial Labor Party =

- Leader: Bob Heffron
- Founded: September 1936
- Dissolved: 26 August 1939
- Split from: Australian Labor Party
- Ideology: Socialism; Industrialisation
- Political position: Left-wing
- NSW Legislative Assembly: 7 / 90 (1939)
- NSW Legislative Council: 1 / 60 (1939)

The Industrial Labor Party or Heffron Labor Party was a short-lived but influential political party active in New South Wales between 1936 and 1939. It was a splinter group of the Labor Party (ALP) and was formed by Bob Heffron after he and Carlo Lazzarini attempted to depose the party leader Jack Lang (who had been Premier of New South Wales 1925-27 and again 1930-32). Both Heffron and Lazzarini subsequently lost their party endorsements for the 1938 election.

At the 1938 election the ILP stood candidates in 6 of the 90 seats and won 3.7% of the popular vote. Heffron and Lazzarini retained their seats in the Legislative Assembly. The party was successful at two subsequent by-elections in the seats of Hurstville, won by Clive Evatt, and Waverley, won by Clarrie Martin. These victories were seen as evidence of Lang's diminishing political power. Three other MLAs, Mat Davidson (Cobar), and Ted Horsington (Sturt) joined the ILP in April 1939 while Frank Burke (Newtown) joined the ILP in June 1939.

Under pressure from the federal executive of the ALP, the ILP was readmitted into the ALP at a unity conference on 26 August 1939. Heffron and William McKell then successfully combined to depose Lang on 5 September 1939.

== Parliamentarians ==
Name	Term	Seat
Bob Heffron (Leader)	August 1936 – 26 August 1939	Botany
Carlo Lazzarini	August 1936 – 26 August 1939	Marrickville
William Dickson	August 1936 – 26 August 1939	Legislative Councillor
Clive Evatt	18 March 1939 – 26 August 1939	Hurstville
Clarrie Martin	22 April 1939 – 26 August 1939	Waverley
Mat Davidson	April 1939 – 26 August 1939	Cobar
Ted Horsington	April 1939 – 26 August 1939	Sturt
Frank Burke	30 May 1939 – 26 August 1939	Newtown
