= John Waddell (politician) =

Politician from New South Wales, Australia

John William Waddell (15 March 1891 – 15 March 1939) was an Australian politician.

He was born at Singleton to Robert Waddell, Clerk of Petty Sessions, and Martha Ann, née Smith. He was educated at Maitland and then at Hawkesbury Agricultural College, before spending time on his uncle's station in Western Australia. In 1912 he joined the Queensland Insurance Company and became a manager at Launceston in Tasmania, before moving to Madras, India, in 1915. On 2 October 1920 he married Ella Wallingford, with whom he had two children. From 1920 to 1926 he was manager of the New India Assurance Company at Calcutta; he travelled around Europe before returning to Australia in 1927. Active in the All for Australia League, he was elected to the New South Wales Legislative Assembly in 1932 as the United Australia Party member for Waverley and served until his death in 1939.

His uncle Thomas Waddell was also a member of Legislative Assembly and briefly Premier, and his cousin Sir Graham Waddell was a member of the Legislative Council from 1937 until 1949.

New South Wales Legislative Assembly
Preceded by William Clementson	Member for Waverley; 1932–1939	Succeeded by Clarrie Martin
