= Electoral district of Woollahra =

Former state electoral district of New South Wales, Australia

Woollahra was an electoral district of the Legislative Assembly in the Australian state of New South Wales, originally created with the abolition of multi-member constituencies in 1894 from part of Paddington, along with Waverley and Randwick. It was named after and including the Sydney suburb of Woollahra. In 1920, with the introduction of proportional representation, it was absorbed into Eastern Suburbs. Woollahra was recreated in 1927 and abolished in 1962.

== Members for Woollahra ==
First incarnation (1894–1920)
Member	Party	Term
Adrian Knox	Ind. Free Trade	1894–1895
Adrian Knox	Free Trade	1895–1898
John Garland	Free Trade	1898–1901
William Latimer	Liberal Reform	1901–1917
William Latimer	Nationalist	1917–1920
Second incarnation (1927–1962)
Member	Party	Term
Maurice O'Sullivan	Labor	1927–1930
Sir Daniel Levy	Nationalist	1930–1931
Sir Daniel Levy	United Australia	1931–1937
Harold Mason	Ind. United Australia	1937–1938
Vernon Treatt	United Australia	1938–1943
Vernon Treatt	Democratic	1943–1945
Vernon Treatt	Liberal	1945–1962

== Election results ==
1959 New South Wales state election: Woollahra
Party	Candidate	Votes	%	±%
Liberal	Vernon Treatt	unopposed		
Liberal hold				
