= Electoral district of Waverley =

Former state electoral district of New South Wales, Australia

Waverley was an electoral district of the Legislative Assembly in the Australian state of New South Wales, originally created in 1894, with the abolition of multi-member constituencies, out of part of Paddington, and named after and including the Sydney suburb of Waverley. In 1904 Waverley lost part of the seat to Randwick and was expanded to include parts of Woollahra and Randwick. In 1920, with the introduction of proportional representation, it was absorbed into Eastern Suburbs. Waverley was recreated in 1927. In 1959 parts of Waverly and Paddington were combined to form Paddington-Waverley, which was abolished in 1962 and replaced by Bligh. In 1971, Bondi and Randwick were abolished and partly replaced by a recreated Waverley. At the 1990 redistribution, Waverley was abolished again and absorbed into Coogee and Vaucluse.

== Members for Waverley ==
First incarnation (1894–1920)
Member	Party	Term
Angus Cameron	Free Trade	1894–1896
Thomas Jessep	Free Trade	1896–1901
Thomas Jessep	Liberal Reform	1901–1907
James Macarthur-Onslow	Independent Liberal	1907–1910
James Macarthur-Onslow	Liberal Reform	1910–1913
James Fingleton	Labor	1913–1917
Charles Oakes	Nationalist	1917–1920
Second incarnation (1927–1959)
Member	Party	Term
Carl Glasgow	Nationalist	1927–1930
William Clementson	Labor	1930–1932
John Waddell	United Australia	1932–1939
Clarrie Martin	Industrial Labor	1939–1940
Clarrie Martin	Labor	1940–1953
William Ferguson	Labor	1953–1959
Third incarnation (1971–1991)
Member	Party	Term
Syd Einfeld	Labor	1971–1981
Ernie Page	Labor	1981–1991

== Election results ==
1988 New South Wales state election: Waverley
Party	Candidate	Votes	%	±%
Labor	Ernie Page	12,360	46.2	−3.3
Liberal	Sally Betts	12,063	45.1	+4.3
Democrats	Heather Meers	2,315	8.7	+1.8
Total formal votes		26,738	96.9	+0.4
Informal votes		843	3.1	−0.4
Turnout		27,581	90.1	
Two-party-preferred result
Labor	Ernie Page	13,303	50.5	−3.9
Liberal	Sally Betts	13,016	49.5	+3.9
Labor hold		Swing	−3.9	
