= Results of the 1956 New South Wales state election =

State election for New South Wales, Australia in March 1956

New South Wales state election, 3 March 1956 Legislative Assembly << 1953–1959 >>
Enrolled voters	2,011,258 (Note: There were 1,846,859 enrolled voters in 86 contested electorates and 164,399 were enrolled in 8 uncontested electorates (2 Labor, 3 Liberal and 3 Country ).)				
Votes cast	1,722,628		Turnout	93.27	−0.59
Informal votes	28,805		Informal	1.67	−0.81
Summary of votes by party
Party	Primary votes	%	Swing	Seats	Change
Labor	800,410	47.25	−8.05	50	−7
Liberal	611,342	36.09	+8.15	27	+5
Country	172,020	10.16	−1.44	15	+1
Independent	53,019	3.13	+0.62	1	+1
Communist	29,534	1.74	+0.36	0	−
Independent Labor	14,950	1.88	−0.19	1	−
Lang Labor	11,028	0.65	+0.17	0	−
All others	1,502	0.09	+0.09	0	−
Total	1,693,823			94	

This is a list of electoral district results for the 1956 New South Wales state election.

== Results by electoral district ==
=== Albury ===
1956 New South Wales state election: Albury
Party	Candidate	Votes	%	±%
Liberal	Doug Padman	11,205	58.4	+6.6
Labor	Robert White	7,988	41.6	−6.6
Total formal votes		19,193	99.1	+0.2
Informal votes		173	0.9	−0.2
Turnout		19,366	92.9	−1.0
Liberal hold		Swing	+6.6	

=== Armidale ===
1956 New South Wales state election: Armidale
Party	Candidate	Votes	%	±%
Country	Davis Hughes	9,107	52.3	+2.3
Labor	Jim Cahill	8,312	47.7	−2.3
Total formal votes		17,419	98.8	+0.2
Informal votes		218	1.2	−0.2
Turnout		17,637	93.7	−1.4
Country gain from Labor		Swing	+2.3	

=== Ashfield ===
1956 New South Wales state election: Ashfield
Party	Candidate	Votes	%	±%
Liberal	Richard Murden	12,134	60.3	+10.0
Labor	James Brady	7,985	39.7	−10.0
Total formal votes		20,119	98.8	+0.4
Informal votes		253	1.2	−0.4
Turnout		20,372	94.1	−0.6
Liberal hold		Swing	+10.0	

=== Auburn ===
1956 New South Wales state election: Auburn
Party	Candidate	Votes	%	±%
Labor	Thomas Ryan	8,430	42.0	−20.0
Liberal	John Steel	5,904	29.4	+29.4
Lang Labor	Chris Lang	5,263	26.2	−11.8
Independent	Edward Spensley	461	2.3	+2.3
Total formal votes		20,058	98.2	+2.1
Informal votes		365	1.8	−2.1
Turnout		20,423	94.3	−0.1
Two-party-preferred result
Labor	Thomas Ryan	13,177	65.7	+3.7
Liberal	John Steel	6,881	34.3	+34.3
Labor hold		Swing	N/A	

=== Balmain ===
1956 New South Wales state election: Balmain
Party	Candidate	Votes	%	±%
Labor	John McMahon	14,613	67.3	−11.8
Liberal	Elton Lewis	5,643	26.0	+26.0
Communist	Stanley Moran	1,461	6.7	+0.2
Total formal votes		21,717	98.3	+2.1
Informal votes		384	1.7	−2.1
Turnout		22,101	92.9	0.0
Two-party-preferred result
Labor	John McMahon	15,928	75.3	−7.0
Liberal	Elton Lewis	5,789	24.7	+24.7
Labor hold		Swing	N/A	

=== Bankstown ===
1956 New South Wales state election: Bankstown
Party	Candidate	Votes	%	±%
Labor	Spence Powell	14,268	59.4	−30.0
Liberal	Reginald Allsop	8,767	36.5	+36.5
Communist	Roy Boyd	981	4.1	−6.5
Total formal votes		24,016	98.2	+5.7
Informal votes		444	1.8	−5.7
Turnout		24,460	94.5	+0.9
Two-party-preferred result
Labor	Spence Powell	18,181	63.1	−26.3
Liberal	Reginald Allsop	8,865	36.9	+36.9
Labor hold		Swing	N/A	

=== Barwon ===
1956 New South Wales state election: Barwon
Party	Candidate	Votes	%	±%
Country	Geoff Crawford	8,733	59.0	+5.2
Labor	Gerard McInerney	6,061	41.0	−5.2
Total formal votes		14,794	99.1	+0.6
Informal votes		140	0.9	−0.6
Turnout		14,934	85.7	−7.3
Country hold		Swing	+5.2	

=== Bathurst ===
1956 New South Wales state election: Bathurst
Party	Candidate	Votes	%	±%
Labor	Gus Kelly	10,340	63.2	−36.8
Liberal	Jack Toole	6,028	36.8	+36.8
Total formal votes		16,368	99.1	
Informal votes		147	0.9	
Turnout		16,515	95.5	
Labor hold		Swing	N/A	

=== Blacktown ===
1956 New South Wales state election: Blacktown
Party	Candidate	Votes	%	±%
Labor	John Freeman	15,188	55.5	−5.7
Liberal	Graham Cullis	12,189	44.5	+8.9
Total formal votes		27,377	98.4	+0.4
Informal votes		451	1.6	−0.4
Turnout		27,828	93.7	−0.4
Labor hold		Swing	−8.5	

=== Bondi ===
1956 New South Wales state election: Bondi
Party	Candidate	Votes	%	±%
Labor	Abe Landa	11,263	54.6	−5.0
Liberal	Daniel Sutherland	9,360	45.4	+5.0
Total formal votes		20,623	98.3	+0.3
Informal votes		353	1.7	−0.3
Turnout		20,976	92.9	−0.4
Labor hold		Swing	−5.0	

=== Bulli ===
1956 New South Wales state election: Bulli
Party	Candidate	Votes	%	±%
Labor	Rex Jackson	11,812	60.8	−27.1
Liberal	Donald Heggie	6,508	33.5	+33.5
Communist	Bill McDougall	1,101	5.7	−6.4
Total formal votes		19,421	98.8	+4.8
Informal votes		227	1.2	−4.8
Turnout		19,648	93.7	−0.6
Two-party-preferred result
Labor	Rex Jackson	12,803	65.9	−22.0
Liberal	Donald Heggie	6,618	34.1	+34.1
Labor hold		Swing	N/A	

=== Burrinjuck ===
1956 New South Wales state election: Burrinjuck
Party	Candidate	Votes	%	±%
Labor	Bill Sheahan	10,124	55.0	−4.5
Country	Allan Johnson	8,278	45.0	+13.0
Total formal votes		18,402	99.2	+0.3
Informal votes		153	0.8	−0.3
Turnout		18,555	95.6	0.0
Labor hold		Swing	+1.2	

=== Burwood ===
1956 New South Wales state election: Burwood
Party	Candidate	Votes	%	±%
Liberal	Leslie Parr	unopposed		
Liberal hold				

=== Byron ===
1956 New South Wales state election: Byron
Party	Candidate	Votes	%	±%
Country	Stanley Stephens	11,394	70.3	−29.7
Independent	Archibald Johnston	4,805	29.7	+29.7
Total formal votes		16,199	98.8	
Informal votes		198	1.2	
Turnout		16,397	92.1	
Country hold		Swing	N/A	

=== Canterbury ===
1956 New South Wales state election: Canterbury
Party	Candidate	Votes	%	±%
Labor	Arthur Tonge	12,032	59.4	−7.1
Liberal	Cecil Ford	8,241	40.6	+11.5
Total formal votes		20,273	98.7	+0.6
Informal votes		275	1.3	−0.6
Turnout		20,548	94.0	0.0
Labor hold		Swing	−10.7	

=== Casino ===
1956 New South Wales state election: Casino
Party	Candidate	Votes	%	±%
Country	Ian Robinson	unopposed		
Country hold				

=== Castlereagh ===
1956 New South Wales state election: Castlereagh
Party	Candidate	Votes	%	±%
Labor	Jack Renshaw	9,388	58.7	−4.1
Country	Norman Brown	6,599	41.3	+4.1
Total formal votes		15,987	99.2	+0.5
Informal votes		134	0.8	−0.5
Turnout		16,121	84.8	−6.0
Labor hold		Swing	−4.1	

=== Cessnock ===
1956 New South Wales state election: Cessnock
Party	Candidate	Votes	%	±%
Labor	John Crook	13,374	69.5	−16.1
Liberal	Harold Hawkes	3,760	19.5	+19.5
Communist	David Stevenson	2,121	11.0	−3.4
Total formal votes		19,255	98.5	+3.4
Informal votes		295	1.5	−3.4
Turnout		19,550	96.5	+1.8
Two-party-preferred result
Labor	John Crook	15,283	79.4	−6.2
Liberal	Harold Hawkes	3,972	20.6	+20.6
Labor hold		Swing	N/A	

=== Clarence ===
1956 New South Wales state election: Clarence
Party	Candidate	Votes	%	±%
Country	Bill Weiley	11,202	64.7	−1.7
Country	Garth Munro	6,124	35.3	+35.3
Total formal votes		17,326	98.2	+0.3
Informal votes		313	1.8	−0.3
Turnout		17,639	93.5	−1.7
Country hold		Swing	N/A	

=== Cobar ===
1956 New South Wales state election: Cobar
Party	Candidate	Votes	%	±%
Labor	Ernest Wetherell	unopposed		
Labor hold				

=== Collaroy ===
1956 New South Wales state election: Collaroy
Party	Candidate	Votes	%	±%
Liberal	Robert Askin	18,038	70.1	+6.8
Independent	Gordon Jones	6,334	24.6	+24.6
Communist	Elfrida Morcom	1,345	5.2	+5.2
Total formal votes		25,717	97.9	−0.1
Informal votes		557	2.1	+0.1
Turnout		26,274	93.5	+1.2
Two-candidate-preferred result
Liberal	Robert Askin	18,374	71.4	+8.1
Independent	Gordon Jones	7,343	28.6	+28.6
Liberal hold		Swing	N/A	

=== Concord ===
1956 New South Wales state election: Concord
Party	Candidate	Votes	%	±%
Liberal	Lerryn Mutton	10,231	49.2	+3.9
Labor	Thomas Murphy	9,833	47.2	−7.5
Communist	Leslie Greenfield	749	3.6	+3.6
Total formal votes		20,813	98.2	+0.1
Informal votes		375	1.8	−0.1
Turnout		21,188	94.1	−0.2
Two-party-preferred result
Labor	Thomas Murphy	10,450	50.2	−4.5
Liberal	Lerryn Mutton	10,363	49.8	+4.5
Labor hold		Swing	−4.5	

=== Coogee ===
1956 New South Wales state election: Coogee
Party	Candidate	Votes	%	±%
Liberal	Kevin Ellis	10,072	51.1	+4.3
Labor	Lou Walsh	9,250	47.0	−6.2
Independent	Tasman Crocker	375	1.9	+1.9
Total formal votes		19,697	98.3	+0.1
Informal votes		334	1.7	−0.1
Turnout		20,031	92.6	−0.6
Two-party-preferred result
Liberal	Kevin Ellis	10,260	52.1	+5.3
Labor	Lou Walsh	9,437	47.9	−5.3
Liberal gain from Labor		Swing	+5.3	

=== Cook's River ===
1956 New South Wales state election: Cook's River
Party	Candidate	Votes	%	±%
Labor	Joseph Cahill	13,591	65.2	−34.8
Independent	William Kendrick	4,135	19.8	+19.8
Liberal	James Skehan	2,302	11.0	+11.0
Communist	Edward Rowe	830	4.0	+4.0
Total formal votes		20,858	97.6	
Informal votes		516	2.4	
Turnout		21,374	94.6	
Two-candidate-preferred result
Labor	Joseph Cahill	14,751	70.7	−29.3
Independent	William Kendrick	6,107	29.3	+29.3
Labor hold		Swing	N/A	

=== Croydon ===
1956 New South Wales state election: Croydon
Party	Candidate	Votes	%	±%
Liberal	David Hunter	11,545	61.6	+6.7
Labor	Frank Zions	7,185	38.4	−6.7
Total formal votes		18,730	98.8	+0.5
Informal votes		234	1.2	−0.5
Turnout		18,964	93.0	−0.7
Liberal hold		Swing	+6.7	

=== Drummoyne ===
1956 New South Wales state election: Drummoyne
Party	Candidate	Votes	%	±%
Liberal	Walter Lawrence	10,881	51.3	+3.4
Labor	Roy Jackson	10,316	48.7	−3.4
Total formal votes		21,197	98.3	+0.3
Informal votes		360	1.7	−0.3
Turnout		21,557	95.0	0.0
Liberal gain from Labor		Swing	+3.4	

=== Dubbo ===
1956 New South Wales state election: Dubbo
Party	Candidate	Votes	%	±%
Labor	Clarrie Robertson	8,241	46.8	−5.2
Country	Keith Sullivan	4,887	27.8	−20.2
Liberal	Neville Magin	4,472	25.4	+25.4
Total formal votes		17,600	98.9	+0.7
Informal votes		200	1.1	−0.7
Turnout		17,800	93.2	−1.6
Two-party-preferred result
Labor	Clarrie Robertson	9,018	51.2	−0.8
Country	Keith Sullivan	8,582	48.8	+0.8
Labor hold		Swing	−0.8	

=== Dulwich Hill ===
1956 New South Wales state election: Dulwich Hill
Party	Candidate	Votes	%	±%
Labor	Cliff Mallam	10,507	52.7	−9.7
Liberal	Lionel Corner	9,436	47.3	+9.7
Total formal votes		19,943	98.4	+0.5
Informal votes		326	1.6	−0.5
Turnout		20,269	92.3	−1.3
Labor hold		Swing	−9.7	

=== Earlwood ===
1956 New South Wales state election: Earlwood
Party	Candidate	Votes	%	±%
Liberal	Eric Willis	14,561	58.0	+7.7
Labor	David Connors	10,525	42.0	−7.7
Total formal votes		25,086	98.8	+0.5
Informal votes		310	1.2	−0.5
Turnout		25,396	95.4	−0.1
Liberal hold		Swing	+7.7	

=== East Hills ===
1956 New South Wales state election: East Hills
Party	Candidate	Votes	%	±%
Labor	Joe Kelly	16,897	56.0	−13.9
Liberal	Harold Stalker	10,515	34.9	+4.8
Independent	Douglas Marshall	2,740	9.1	+9.1
Total formal votes		30,152	97.9	0.0
Informal votes		656	2.1	0.0
Turnout		30,808	93.8	−0.2
Two-party-preferred result
Labor	Joe Kelly	18,267	60.6	−9.3
Liberal	Harold Stalker	11,885	39.4	+9.3
Labor hold		Swing	−9.3	

=== Eastwood ===
1956 New South Wales state election: Eastwood
Party	Candidate	Votes	%	±%
Liberal	Eric Hearnshaw	unopposed		
Liberal hold				

=== Fairfield ===
1956 New South Wales state election: Fairfield
Party	Candidate	Votes	%	±%
Labor	Clarrie Earl	16,258	62.9	−28.4
Liberal	Guy Holmes	8,541	33.0	+33.0
Communist	Edwin Lipscombe	1,057	4.1	−4.6
Total formal votes		25,856	98.3	+8.0
Informal votes		456	1.7	−8.0
Turnout		26,312	93.3	+0.1
Two-party-preferred result
Labor	Clarrie Earl	17,209	66.6	−24.7
Liberal	Guy Holmes	8,647	33.4	+33.4
Labor hold		Swing	N/A	

=== Georges River ===
1956 New South Wales state election: Georges River
Party	Candidate	Votes	%	±%
Liberal	Douglas Cross	12,852	52.4	+11.0
Labor	Frank O'Neill	10,765	43.9	−14.7
Communist	Paul Mortier	907	3.7	+3.7
Total formal votes		24,524	98.5	+0.5
Informal votes		365	1.5	−0.5
Turnout		24,889	94.7	+0.1
Two-party-preferred result
Liberal	Douglas Cross	12,943	52.8	+11.4
Labor	Frank O'Neill	11,581	47.2	−11.4
Liberal gain from Labor		Swing	+11.4	

=== Gloucester ===
1956 New South Wales state election: Gloucester
Party	Candidate	Votes	%	±%
Country	Ray Fitzgerald	10,307	65.4	+2.4
Labor	Thomas Breen	5,440	34.6	−2.4
Total formal votes		15,747	98.7	+0.5
Informal votes		206	1.3	−0.5
Turnout		15,953	92.0	−2.8
Country hold		Swing	+2.4	

=== Gordon ===
1956 New South Wales state election: Gordon
Party	Candidate	Votes	%	±%
Liberal	Stewart Fraser	unopposed		
Liberal hold				

=== Gosford ===
1956 New South Wales state election: Gosford
Party	Candidate	Votes	%	±%
Liberal	Harold Jackson	11,096	56.8	+2.8
Labor	Rupert Wallace	7,164	36.7	−9.3
Communist	Alan Brackenreg	626	3.2	+3.2
Independent	Roy Jackson	463	2.4	+2.4
Independent	Leslie Moffat	174	0.9	+0.9
Total formal votes		19,523	98.2	+0.2
Informal votes		356	1.8	−0.2
Turnout		19,879	93.4	+0.2
Two-party-preferred result
Liberal	Harold Jackson	11,478	58.7	+4.7
Labor	Rupert Wallace	8,045	41.3	−4.7
Liberal hold		Swing	+4.7	

=== Goulburn ===
1956 New South Wales state election: Goulburn
Party	Candidate	Votes	%	±%
Labor	Laurie Tully	8,666	52.9	−9.7
Liberal	Ray Bladwell	7,724	47.1	+9.7
Total formal votes		16,390	99.4	+1.2
Informal votes		97	0.6	−1.2
Turnout		16,487	95.2	−0.7
Labor hold		Swing	−9.7	

=== Granville ===
1956 New South Wales state election: Granville
Party	Candidate	Votes	%	±%
Labor	Bill Lamb	14,613	67.1	−25.8
Liberal	Robert Mutton	6,314	29.0	+29.0
Communist	Rupert Lockwood	865	4.0	−3.1
Total formal votes		21,792	98.0	+6.0
Informal votes		440	2.0	−6.0
Turnout		22,232	94.3	−0.4
Two-party-preferred result
Labor	Bill Lamb	15,391	70.6	−22.3
Liberal	Robert Mutton	6,401	29.4	+29.4
Labor hold		Swing	N/A	

=== Hamilton ===
1956 New South Wales state election: Hamilton
Party	Candidate	Votes	%	±%
Labor	George Campbell	9,157	55.7	−8.5
Liberal	Horace Smith	7,281	44.3	+8.5
Total formal votes		16,438	99.0	+0.9
Informal votes		157	1.0	−0.9
Turnout		16,595	94.8	0.0
Labor hold		Swing	−8.5	

=== Hartley ===
1956 New South Wales state election: Hartley
Party	Candidate	Votes	%	±%
Labor	Jim Robson	7,595	44.7	+13.0
Independent Labor	William Black	7,539	44.3	−12.9
Communist	John King	825	4.9	−6.2
Independent	Neville Weekes	545	3.2	+3.2
Independent	Leslie Cant	498	2.9	+2.9
Total formal votes		17,002	96.0	−0.5
Informal votes		709	4.0	+0.5
Turnout		17,711	95.4	+0.3
Two-candidate-preferred result
Labor	Jim Robson	8,567	50.4	+14.0
Independent Labor	William Black	8,435	49.6	−14.0
Labor gain from Independent Labor		Swing	+14.0	

The sitting member for Hartley, Jim Chalmers (Independent Labor), unsuccessfully contested Nepean.

=== Hawkesbury ===
1956 New South Wales state election: Hawkesbury
Party	Candidate	Votes	%	±%
Liberal	Bernie Deane	11,013	64.3	+7.1
Labor	John Grinham	6,113	35.7	−7.1
Total formal votes		17,126	98.3	+0.1
Informal votes		298	1.7	−0.1
Turnout		17,424	91.4	−1.2
Liberal hold		Swing	+7.1	

=== Hornsby ===
1956 New South Wales state election: Hornsby
Party	Candidate	Votes	%	±%
Liberal	Sydney Storey	16,665	69.1	+8.6
Labor	Francis O'Connell	7,447	30.9	+30.9
Total formal votes		24,112	98.4	+0.6
Informal votes		402	1.6	−0.6
Turnout		24,514	93.1	+0.5
Liberal hold		Swing	N/A	

=== Hurstville ===
1956 New South Wales state election: Hurstville
Party	Candidate	Votes	%	±%
Labor	Clive Evatt	11,459	51.4	−7.2
Liberal	Hedley Mallard	9,982	44.8	+3.4
Independent	Edward Merryfull	835	3.8	+3.8
Total formal votes		22,276	98.7	+0.5
Informal votes		300	1.3	−0.5
Turnout		22,576	94.8	−0.3
Two-party-preferred result
Labor	Clive Evatt	11,876	53.3	−5.3
Liberal	Hedley Mallard	10,400	46.7	+5.3
Labor hold		Swing	−5.3	

=== Illawarra ===
1956 New South Wales state election: Illawarra
Party	Candidate	Votes	%	±%
Labor	Howard Fowles	10,809	59.9	−40.1
Liberal	Adrian O'Donnell	6,180	34.2	+34.2
Communist	David Bowen	1,070	5.9	+5.9
Total formal votes		18,059	98.4	
Informal votes		299	1.6	
Turnout		18,358	94.0	
Two-party-preferred result
Labor	Howard Fowles	11,772	65.2	−34.8
Liberal	Adrian O'Donnell	6,287	34.8	+34.8
Labor hold		Swing	N/A	

=== Kahibah ===
1956 New South Wales state election: Kahibah
Party	Candidate	Votes	%	±%
Labor	Robert McCartney	7,238	39.0	−25.7
Independent Labor	Tom Armstrong	6,195	33.4	+33.4
Liberal	Joseph Richley	5,129	27.6	−7.7
Total formal votes		18,562	98.9	+3.1
Informal votes		213	1.1	−3.1
Turnout		18,775	95.9	−0.1
Two-candidate-preferred result
Independent Labor	Tom Armstrong	10,618	57.2	+57.2
Labor	Robert McCartney	7,944	42.8	−21.9
Independent Labor gain from Labor		Swing	N/A	

Joshua Arthur (Labor) resigned as a result of the Royal Commission concerning his relationship with Reginald Doyle. Tom Armstrong (Independent Labor) won the resulting by-election.

=== King ===
1956 New South Wales state election: King
Party	Candidate	Votes	%	±%
Labor	Albert Sloss	10,700	56.6	−21.2
Liberal	Roberta Galagher	4,456	23.6	+1.4
Lang Labor	Michael Callinan	2,568	13.6	+13.6
Communist	Ron Maxwell	1,179	6.2	+6.2
Total formal votes		18,903	96.5	+0.3
Informal votes		690	3.5	−0.3
Turnout		19,593	90.0	+0.9
Two-party-preferred result
Labor	Albert Sloss	13,610	72.0	−5.8
Liberal	Roberta Galagher	5,293	28.0	+5.8
Labor hold		Swing	−5.8	

=== Kogarah ===
1956 New South Wales state election: Kogarah
Party	Candidate	Votes	%	±%
Labor	Bill Crabtree	12,467	55.0	−0.7
Liberal	Horace Harper	10,195	45.0	+0.7
Total formal votes		22,662	98.8	+0.6
Informal votes		276	1.2	−0.6
Turnout		22,938	94.1	−0.5
Labor hold		Swing	−0.7	

=== Kurri Kurri ===
1956 New South Wales state election: Kurri Kurri
Party	Candidate	Votes	%	±%
Labor	George Booth	15,610	84.4	
Liberal	Stanley Mettam	2,897	15.6	
Total formal votes		18,507	98.5	
Informal votes		285	1.5	
Turnout		18,792	95.3	
Labor hold		Swing	N/A	

=== Lake Macquarie ===
1956 New South Wales state election: Lake Macquarie
Party	Candidate	Votes	%	±%
Labor	Jim Simpson	14,321	69.2	−30.8
Liberal	Edward Farrell	4,756	23.0	+23.0
Communist	William Quinn	1,619	7.8	+7.8
Total formal votes		20,696	98.5	
Informal votes		311	1.5	
Turnout		21,007	95.3	
Two-party-preferred result
Labor	Jim Simpson	15,382	74.8	−25.2
Liberal	Edward Farrell	5,314	25.2	+25.2
Labor hold		Swing	N/A	

=== Lakemba ===
1956 New South Wales state election: Lakemba
Party	Candidate	Votes	%	±%
Labor	Stan Wyatt	13,874	60.2	−8.6
Liberal	John Whelan	7,818	33.9	+2.7
Communist	James Staples	1,365	5.9	+5.9
Total formal votes		23,057	98.2	−0.2
Informal votes		416	1.8	+0.2
Turnout		23,473	94.8	+0.3
Two-party-preferred result
Labor	Stan Wyatt	15,102	65.5	−3.3
Liberal	John Whelan	7,955	34.5	+3.3
Labor hold		Swing	−3.3	

=== Lane Cove ===
1956 New South Wales state election: Lane Cove
Party	Candidate	Votes	%	±%
Liberal	Ken McCaw	16,066	74.1	+8.7
Labor	Geoffrey O'Donnell	5,605	25.9	−8.7
Total formal votes		21,671	98.6	+0.5
Informal votes		316	1.4	−0.5
Turnout		21,987	93.1	+0.1
Liberal hold		Swing	+8.7	

=== Leichhardt ===
1956 New South Wales state election: Leichhardt
Party	Candidate	Votes	%	±%
Labor	Reg Coady	14,145	68.9	−5.6
Liberal	Barney Morton	6,386	31.1	+5.6
Total formal votes		20,531	97.8	+0.5
Informal votes		462	2.2	−0.5
Turnout		20,993	91.7	−0.9
Labor hold		Swing	−5.6	

=== Lismore ===
1956 New South Wales state election: Lismore
Party	Candidate	Votes	%	±%
Country	Jack Easter	9,914	61.4	+25.5
Labor	Archibald McEwan	4,039	25.0	−9.3
Independent	Constance Wilson	2,190	13.6	+13.6
Total formal votes		16,143	99.3	+0.4
Informal votes		109	0.7	−0.4
Turnout		16,252	92.4	−2.5
Two-party-preferred result
Country	Jack Easter	11,009	68.2	+5.2
Labor	Archibald McEwan	5,134	31.8	−5.2
Country hold		Swing	+5.2	

=== Liverpool ===
1956 New South Wales state election: Liverpool
Party	Candidate	Votes	%	±%
Labor	Jack Mannix	unopposed		
Labor hold				

=== Liverpool Plains ===
1956 New South Wales state election: Liverpool Plains
Party	Candidate	Votes	%	±%
Labor	Roger Nott	9,109	54.7	−4.3
Country	Geoffrey Thomas	4,868	29.2	+0.9
Liberal	Henry Gregson	2,609	15.7	+2.9
Independent	John Pender	72	0.4	+0.4
Total formal votes		16,658	99.2	+0.3
Informal votes		139	0.8	−0.3
Turnout		16,797	94.0	−1.9
Two-party-preferred result
Labor	Roger Nott	9,406	56.5	−3.5
Country	Geoffrey Thomas	7,252	43.5	+3.5
Labor hold		Swing	−3.5	

=== Maitland ===
1956 New South Wales state election: Maitland
Party	Candidate	Votes	%	±%
Liberal	Milton Morris	7,195	45.9	−7.9
Labor	Cecil Robinson	6,580	42.0	−4.2
Independent	Leonard Neville	918	5.9	+5.9
Independent	Edward Fletcher	715	4.6	+4.6
Independent	Henry Ivins	267	1.7	+1.7
Total formal votes		15,675	98.2	−0.4
Informal votes		289	1.8	+0.4
Turnout		15,964	95.8	−0.8
Two-party-preferred result
Liberal	Milton Morris	8,778	56.0	+2.1
Labor	Cecil Robinson	6,897	44.0	−2.1
Liberal hold		Swing	+2.1	

=== Manly ===
1956 New South Wales state election: Manly
Party	Candidate	Votes	%	±%
Liberal	Douglas Darby	13,646	67.9	+5.3
Labor	John Wilson	6,462	32.1	−5.3
Total formal votes		20,108	97.1	−1.2
Informal votes		589	2.9	+1.2
Turnout		20,697	94.4	+1.5
Liberal hold		Swing	+5.3	

=== Maroubra ===
1956 New South Wales state election: Maroubra
Party	Candidate	Votes	%	±%
Labor	Bob Heffron	14,820	64.9	−35.1
Liberal	Wallace Peacock	8,018	35.1	+35.1
Total formal votes		22,838	98.4	
Informal votes		376	1.6	
Turnout		23,214	93.9	
Labor hold		Swing	N/A	

=== Marrickville ===
1956 New South Wales state election: Marrickville
Party	Candidate	Votes	%	±%
Labor	Norm Ryan	12,093	61.4	−19.4
Liberal	Ian Chisholm	6,352	32.2	+32.2
Communist	Adam Ogston	652	3.3	+3.3
Republican	William McCristal	602	3.1	+3.1
Total formal votes		19,699	97.7	+3.6
Informal votes		472	2.3	−3.6
Turnout		20,171	93.6	−0.5
Two-party-preferred result
Labor	Norm Ryan	12,981	65.9	−14.9
Liberal	Ian Chisholm	6,718	34.1	+34.1
Labor hold		Swing	N/A	

=== Monaro ===
1956 New South Wales state election: Monaro
Party	Candidate	Votes	%	±%
Labor	John Seiffert	8,709	58.4	−6.3
Liberal	Ernest Smith	5,604	37.5	+2.2
Country	Frederick Von Nida	613	4.1	+4.1
Total formal votes		14,926	98.9	+0.8
Informal votes		161	1.1	−0.8
Turnout		15,087	93.0	−1.3
Two-party-preferred result
Labor	John Seiffert	8,770	58.7	−6.0
Liberal	Ernest Smith	8,156	41.3	+6.0
Labor hold		Swing	−6.0	

=== Mosman ===
1956 New South Wales state election: Mosman
Party	Candidate	Votes	%	±%
Liberal	Pat Morton	18,396	78.7	+3.1
Labor	Malcolm Stuart−Robertson	4,968	21.3	−3.1
Total formal votes		23,364	98.3	+0.5
Informal votes		391	1.7	−0.5
Turnout		23,755	93.3	+0.8
Liberal hold		Swing	+3.1	

=== Mudgee ===
1956 New South Wales state election: Mudgee
Party	Candidate	Votes	%	±%
Labor	Leo Nott	8,220	50.7	−2.3
Liberal	Eric Hennessy	4,650	28.7	+28.7
Country	Kenneth Masters	3,343	20.6	−26.4
Total formal votes		16,213	99.0	+0.6
Informal votes		160	1.0	−0.6
Turnout		16,373	94.2	−0.8
Two-party-preferred result
Labor	Leo Nott	8,554	52.8	−0.2
Liberal	Eric Hennessy	7,659	47.2	+0.2
Labor hold		Swing	−0.2	

=== Murray ===
1956 New South Wales state election: Murray
Party	Candidate	Votes	%	±%
Country	Joe Lawson	12,106	70.1	+11.9
Labor	Willie Peters	5,164	29.9	−11.9
Total formal votes		17,270	99.3	+0.7
Informal votes		122	0.7	−0.7
Turnout		17,392	86.8	−2.4
Country hold		Swing	+11.9	

=== Murrumbidgee ===
1956 New South Wales state election: Murrumbidgee
Party	Candidate	Votes	%	±%
Labor	George Enticknap	9,644	55.5	−6.8
Country	Michael Cudmore	7,721	44.5	+6.8
Total formal votes		17,365	98.7	+0.5
Informal votes		223	1.3	−0.5
Turnout		17,588	89.1	−3.5
Labor hold		Swing	−6.8	

=== Nepean ===
1956 New South Wales state election: Nepean
Party	Candidate	Votes	%	±%
Liberal	Bill Chapman	10,335	54.0	+1.5
Labor	Alfred Bennett	6,946	36.3	−11.2
Independent Labor	Jim Chalmers	1,216	6.4	+6.4
Communist	Mel McCalman	635	3.3	+3.3
Total formal votes		19,132	98.1	0.0
Informal votes		379	1.9	0.0
Turnout		19,511	93.9	+0.9
Two-party-preferred result
Liberal	Bill Chapman	10,641	55.6	+3.0
Labor	Alfred Bennett	8,491	44.4	−3.0
Liberal hold		Swing	+3.0	

=== Neutral Bay ===
1956 New South Wales state election: Neutral Bay
Party	Candidate	Votes	%	±%
Liberal	Ivan Black	15,585	74.9	−25.1
Labor	Donald Gray	5,228	25.1	+25.1
Total formal votes		20,813	98.4	
Informal votes		330	1.6	
Turnout		21,143	91.6	
Liberal hold		Swing	N/A	

=== Newcastle ===
1956 New South Wales state election: Newcastle
Party	Candidate	Votes	%	±%
Labor	Frank Hawkins	10,358	66.5	−26.1
Liberal	Iris Hyde	4,410	28.3	+28.3
Communist	Mervyn Copley	819	5.2	−2.2
Total formal votes		15,587	98.5	+3.6
Informal votes		239	1.5	−3.6
Turnout		15,826	93.8	−0.9
Two-party-preferred result
Labor	Frank Hawkins	11,095	71.2	−21.4
Liberal	Iris Hyde	4,492	28.8	+28.8
Labor hold		Swing	N/A	

=== North Sydney ===
1956 New South Wales state election: North Sydney
Party	Candidate	Votes	%	±%
Labor	Ray Maher	9,827	48.6	+16.2
Liberal	Peter Murphy	9,771	48.3	+13.4
Communist	Bill Wood	637	3.1	+3.1
Total formal votes		20,235	98.5	+1.0
Informal votes		302	1.5	−1.0
Turnout		20,537	93.2	−0.5
Two-party-preferred result
Labor	Ray Maher	10,281	50.8	−5.2
Liberal	Peter Murphy	9,954	49.2	+5.2
Labor hold		Swing	−5.2	

=== Orange ===
1956 New South Wales state election: Orange
Party	Candidate	Votes	%	±%
Country	Charles Cutler	10,863	59.7	+5.4
Labor	Louie Cassey	7,137	39.2	−6.5
Communist	Cecil Connors	194	1.1	+1.1
Total formal votes		18,194	99.1	+0.5
Informal votes		166	0.9	−0.5
Turnout		18,360	95.4	−0.2
Two-party-preferred result
Country	Charles Cutler	10,882	59.8	+5.5
Labor	Louie Cassey	7,312	40.2	−5.5
Country hold		Swing	+5.5	

=== Oxley ===
1956 New South Wales state election: Oxley
Party	Candidate	Votes	%	±%
Country	Les Jordan	10,695	58.6	+3.4
Labor	William Kennewell	6,769	37.1	+0.8
Independent	Joe Cordner	780	4.3	+2.5
Total formal votes		18,244	99.1	+0.6
Informal votes		174	0.9	−0.6
Turnout		18,418	93.1	−3.4
Two-party-preferred result
Country	Les Jordan	11,085	60.8	+0.1
Labor	William Kennewell	7,159	39.2	−0.1
Country hold		Swing	+0.1	

=== Paddington ===
1956 New South Wales state election: Paddington
Party	Candidate	Votes	%	±%
Labor	Maurice O'Sullivan	12,570	66.4	−20.6
Liberal	Rodney Craigie	4,339	22.9	+22.9
Communist	Bill Brown	2,035	10.7	−2.3
Total formal votes		18,944	97.1	+4.4
Informal votes		573	2.9	−4.4
Turnout		19,517	91.4	+1.1
Two-party-preferred result
Labor	Maurice O'Sullivan	14,401	76.0	−11.0
Liberal	Rodney Craigie	4,543	24.0	+24.0
Labor hold		Swing	N/A	

=== Parramatta ===
1956 New South Wales state election: Parramatta
Party	Candidate	Votes	%	±%
Liberal	Jim Clough	13,423	52.1	+4.3
Labor	Kevin Morgan	12,344	47.9	−2.8
Total formal votes		25,767	98.5	+0.3
Informal votes		381	1.5	−0.3
Turnout		26,148	94.1	−0.4
Liberal gain from Labor		Swing	+3.6	

=== Phillip ===
1956 New South Wales state election: Phillip
Party	Candidate	Votes	%	±%
Labor	Pat Hills	14,287	75.6	−24.4
Lang Labor	Francis Mohan	3,197	16.9	+16.9
Communist	Robert Webster	1,407	7.5	+7.5
Total formal votes		18,791	95.8	
Informal votes		832	4.2	
Turnout		19,723	92.0	
Two-candidate-preferred result
Labor	Pat Hills	15,342	81.2	−18.8
Lang Labor	Francis Mohan	3,549	18.8	+18.8
Labor hold		Swing	N/A	

=== Raleigh ===
1956 New South Wales state election: Raleigh
Party	Candidate	Votes	%	±%
Country	Radford Gamack	unopposed		
Country hold				

=== Randwick ===
1956 New South Wales state election: Randwick
Party	Candidate	Votes	%	±%
Labor	William Gollan	10,281	52.6	−11.1
Liberal	Charles De Monchaux	8,777	44.9	+8.6
Communist	Kenneth O'Hara	498	2.5	+2.5
Total formal votes		19,556	98.3	+0.3
Informal votes		411	2.0	−0.3
Turnout		19,903	93.2	−0.1
Two-party-preferred result
Labor	William Gollan	10,729	54.9	−8.8
Liberal	Charles De Monchaux	8,827	45.1	+8.8
Labor hold		Swing	−8.8	

=== Redfern ===
1956 New South Wales state election: Redfern
Party	Candidate	Votes	%	±%
Labor	Fred Green	16,584	90.4	−2.3
Communist	Arthur Shipton	1,754	9.6	+2.3
Total formal votes		18,338	93.5	−0.4
Informal votes		1,265	6.5	+0.4
Turnout		19,603	93.6	+1.4
Labor hold		Swing	−2.3	

=== Rockdale ===
1956 New South Wales state election: Rockdale
Party	Candidate	Votes	%	±%
Labor	John McGrath	11,469	51.3	−9.2
Liberal	Harold Heslehurst	10,890	48.7	+9.2
Total formal votes		22,359	98.3	+0.8
Informal votes		387	1.7	−0.8
Turnout		22,746	94.1	−0.4
Labor hold		Swing	−9.2	

=== Ryde ===
1956 New South Wales state election: Ryde
Party	Candidate	Votes	%	±%
Labor	Frank Downing	12,001	50.1	−4.4
Liberal	Francis Collings	11,959	49.9	+4.4
Total formal votes		23,960	98.2	+0.1
Informal votes		436	1.8	−0.1
Turnout		24,396	94.6	−0.6
Labor hold		Swing	−4.4	

=== South Coast ===
1956 New South Wales state election: South Coast
Party	Candidate	Votes	%	±%
Liberal	Jack Beale	11,795	68.5	+7.7
Labor	Allan Beaton	5,416	31.5	−7.7
Total formal votes		17,211	99.2	+0.4
Informal votes		132	0.8	−0.4
Turnout		17,343	94.1	+0.2
Liberal hold		Swing	+7.7	

=== Sturt ===
1956 New South Wales state election: Sturt
Party	Candidate	Votes	%	±%
Labor	William Wattison	10,107	70.0	−30.0
Independent	John Fox	2,858	19.8	+19.8
Communist	William Flynn	1,468	10.2	+10.2
Total formal votes		14,433	98.0	
Informal votes		287	2.0	
Turnout		14,720	87.2	
Two-candidate-preferred result
Labor	William Wattison	10,841	75.1	−24.9
Independent	John Fox	3,592	24.9	+24.9
Labor hold		Swing	N/A	

=== Sutherland ===
1956 New South Wales state election: Sutherland
Party	Candidate	Votes	%	±%
Liberal	Ian Griffith	14,812	52.5	+5.8
Labor	Tom Dalton	13,388	47.5	−5.8
Total formal votes		28,200	98.7	+0.3
Informal votes		377	1.3	−0.3
Turnout		28,577	94.6	+0.7
Liberal gain from Labor		Swing	+5.8	

=== Tamworth ===
1956 New South Wales state election: Tamworth
Party	Candidate	Votes	%	±%
Country	Bill Chaffey	11,203	61.8	+7.2
Labor	Arthur Foran	6,921	38.2	−7.2
Total formal votes		18,124	99.1	+0.1
Informal votes		163	0.9	−0.1
Turnout		18,287	92.8	−3.1
Country hold		Swing	+7.2	

=== Temora ===
1956 New South Wales state election: Temora
Party	Candidate	Votes	%	±%
Country	Doug Dickson	10,039	64.4	+3.2
Labor	Hector Skidmore	5,549	35.6	−3.2
Total formal votes		15,588	99.0	+0.2
Informal votes		152	1.0	−0.2
Turnout		15,740	91.9	−2.2
Country hold		Swing	+3.2	

=== Tenterfield ===
1956 New South Wales state election: Tenterfield
Party	Candidate	Votes	%	±%
Country	Michael Bruxner	unopposed		
Country hold				

=== Upper Hunter ===
1956 New South Wales state election: Upper Hunter
Party	Candidate	Votes	%	±%
Country	D'Arcy Rose	9,166	57.0	+1.7
Labor	Albert Khan	6,907	43.0	−1.7
Total formal votes		16,073	99.4	+0.3
Informal votes		99	0.6	−0.3
Turnout		16,172	94.6	−1.1
Country hold		Swing	+1.7	

=== Vaucluse ===
1956 New South Wales state election: Vaucluse
Party	Candidate	Votes	%	±%
Liberal	Murray Robson	14,865	71.4	−28.6
Independent	Alfred Elboz	5,950	28.6	+28.6
Total formal votes		20,815	97.3	
Informal votes		575	2.7	
Turnout		21,390	90.3	
Liberal hold		Swing	N/A	

=== Wagga Wagga ===
1956 New South Wales state election: Wagga Wagga
Party	Candidate	Votes	%	±%
Labor	Eddie Graham	10,250	60.3	−3.9
Liberal	Wal Fife	6,743	39.7	+3.9
Total formal votes		16,993	99.2	+1.1
Informal votes		144	0.8	−1.1
Turnout		17,137	93.9	−0.4
Labor hold		Swing	−5.7	

=== Waratah ===
1956 New South Wales state election: Waratah
Party	Candidate	Votes	%	±%
Independent	Frank Purdue	8,829	48.8	+48.8
Labor	Harry Sheedy	6,608	36.6	−31.3
Independent	Harry Edwards	2,201	12.2	+12.2
Communist	Thomas Graham	434	2.4	+2.4
Total formal votes		18,072	98.7	+1.6
Informal votes		235	1.3	−1.6
Turnout		18,307	95.7	−0.2
Two-candidate-preferred result
Independent	Frank Purdue	10,129	56.0	+56.0
Labor	Harry Sheedy	7,943	44.0	−23.9
Independent gain from Labor		Swing	N/A	

=== Waverley ===
1956 New South Wales state election: Waverley
Party	Candidate	Votes	%	±%
Labor	William Ferguson	11,373	58.6	−9.9
Liberal	John Steinwede	7,145	36.8	+5.3
Communist	Eddie Maher	900	4.6	+4.6
Total formal votes		19,418	97.9	0.0
Informal votes		425	2.1	0.0
Turnout		19,843	90.8	−0.3
Two-party-preferred result
Labor	William Ferguson	12,183	62.7	−5.8
Liberal	John Steinwede	7,235	37.3	+5.8
Labor hold		Swing	−5.8	

=== Willoughby ===
1956 New South Wales state election: Willoughby
Party	Candidate	Votes	%	±%
Liberal	George Brain	15,682	72.0	+7.4
Labor	Anthony Coates	6,086	28.0	−7.4
Total formal votes		21,768	98.8	+0.4
Informal votes		271	1.2	−0.4
Turnout		22,039	92.9	−0.9
Liberal hold		Swing	+7.4	

=== Wollondilly ===
1956 New South Wales state election: Wollondilly
Party	Candidate	Votes	%	±%
Liberal	Blake Pelly	11,675	65.2	+8.3
Labor	Ernest Seager	6,220	34.8	−8.3
Total formal votes		17,895	98.9	+0.3
Informal votes		204	1.1	−0.3
Turnout		18,099	94.6	+0.4
Liberal hold		Swing	+8.3	

=== Wollongong−Kembla ===
1956 New South Wales state election: Wollongong−Kembla
Party	Candidate	Votes	%	±%
Labor	Rex Connor	9,636	55.2	+0.3
Liberal	Robert Albert	6,027	34.5	+34.5
Independent	George Parker	1,785	10.2	−30.4
Total formal votes		17,448	98.3	+1.4
Informal votes		293	1.7	−1.4
Turnout		17,741	93.7	−0.9
Two-party-preferred result
Labor	Rex Connor	10,528	60.3	+4.3
Liberal	Robert Albert	6,920	39.7	+39.7
Labor hold		Swing	N/A	

=== Woollahra ===
1956 New South Wales state election: Woollahra
Party	Candidate	Votes	%	±%
Liberal	Vernon Treatt	14,592	70.8	+3.2
Independent	George Mason	6,007	29.2	+29.2
Total formal votes		20,599	95.3	−2.3
Informal votes		1,010	4.7	+2.3
Turnout		21,609	87.7	−0.7
Liberal hold		Swing	N/A	

=== Young ===
1956 New South Wales state election: Young
Party	Candidate	Votes	%	±%
Labor	Fred Cahill	9,371	49.0	−8.2
Liberal	Raymond Oliver	4,904	25.6	+25.6
Country	George Freudenstein	4,858	25.4	−17.4
Total formal votes		19,133	99.2	+0.1
Informal votes		151	0.8	−0.1
Turnout		19,284	95.1	−0.5
Two-party-preferred result
Labor	Fred Cahill	9,746	50.9	−6.3
Liberal	Raymond Oliver	9,387	49.1	+6.3
Labor hold		Swing	−6.3	

== See also ==
- Candidates of the 1956 New South Wales state election
- Members of the New South Wales Legislative Assembly, 1956–1959
