= Members of the New South Wales Legislative Assembly, 1953–1956 =

× Members of the New South Wales Legislative Assembly who served in the 37th parliament held their seats from 1953 to 1956. They were elected at the 1953 state election, and at by-elections. The Speaker was Bill Lamb.

Name	Party	Electorate	Term in office
Tom Armstrong (Note: Kahibah MLA Joshua Arthur resigned on 19 August 1953 and was expelled from the Labor Party, following adverse findings into his conduct by a Royal Commission. Independent Labor candidate Tom Armstrong won the resulting by-election.)	Independent Labor	Kahibah	1953–1957
Joshua Arthur	Labor	Kahibah	1935–1953
Robert Askin	Liberal	Collaroy	1950–1975
Jack Beale	Liberal	South Coast	1942–1973
Ivan Black	Liberal	Neutral Bay	1945–1951, 1951–1962
George Booth	Labor	Kurri Kurri	1925–1960
George Brain	Liberal	Willoughby	1943–1968
Michael Bruxner	Country	Tenterfield	1920–1962
Fred Cahill	Labor	Young	1941–1959
Jim Cahill	Labor	Armidale	1953–1956
Joseph Cahill	Labor	Cook's River	1925–1959
Robert Cameron	Labor	Waratah	1927–1956
George Campbell	Labor	Hamilton	1950–1959
Bill Chaffey	Country	Tamworth	1940–1973
Jim Chalmers	Independent Labor	Hartley	1947–1956
Daniel Clyne	Labor	King	1927–1956
Reg Coady (Note: Leichhardt Labor MLA Claude Matthews committed suicide on 9 January 1954. Labor candidate Reg Coady won the resulting by-election on 20 March 1954.)	Labor	Leichhardt	1954–1973
Rex Connor	Labor	Wollongong-Kembla	1950–1963
Bill Crabtree	Labor	Kogarah	1953–1983
Geoff Crawford	Country	Barwon	1950–1976
John Crook	Labor	Cessnock	1949–1959
Charles Cutler	Country	Orange	1947–1975
Tom Dalton	Labor	Sutherland	1953–1956, 1959–1968
Douglas Darby	Liberal	Manly	1945–1978
Bernie Deane	Liberal	Hawkesbury	1950–1972
Doug Dickson	Country	Temora	1938–1960
Frank Downing	Labor	Ryde	1953–1968
Edgar Dring (Note: Auburn Labor MLA Edgar Dring died on 17 December 1955. No by-election was held due to the proximity of the 1956 state election.)	Labor	Auburn	1941–1955
Clarrie Earl	Labor	Fairfield	1953–1973
Jack Easter	Country	Lismore	1953–1959
George Enticknap	Labor	Murrumbidgee	1941–1965
Clive Evatt	Labor	Hurstville	1939–1959
William Ferguson (Note: Waverley Labor MLA Clarrie Martin died on 5 September 1953. Labor candidate William Ferguson won the resulting by-election on 31 October 1953.)	Labor	Waverley	1953–1961
Ray Fitzgerald	Country	Gloucester	1941–1962
Howard Fowles	Labor	Illawarra	1941–1968
Stewart Fraser	Liberal	Gordon	1953–1962
John Freeman	Labor	Blacktown	1945–1959
Radford Gamack	Country	Raleigh	1953–1959
William Gollan	Labor	Randwick	1941–1962
Eddie Graham	Labor	Wagga Wagga	1941–1957
Fred Green	Labor	Redfern	1950–1968
Frank Hawkins	Labor	Newcastle	1935–1968
Eric Hearnshaw	Liberal	Eastwood	1945–1965
Robert Heffron	Labor	Maroubra	1930–1968
Pat Hills (Note: Phillip Labor MLA Tom Shannon died in June 1954. Labor candidate and Lord Mayor of Sydney Pat Hills won the resulting by-election on 14 August 1954.)	Labor	Phillip	1954–1988
Walter Howarth	Liberal	Maitland	1932–1956
David Hunter	Liberal	Croydon	1940–1976
Harold Jackson	Liberal	Gosford	1950–1965
Joseph Jackson	Liberal	Nepean	1922–1956
Rex Jackson (Note: Bulli Labor MLA Laurie Kelly died on 9 May 1955. Labor candidate Rex Jackson won the resulting by-election on 9 July 1955.)	Labor	Bulli	1955–1986
Roy Jackson	Labor	Drummoyne	1953–1956
Les Jordan	Country	Oxley	1944–1965
Gus Kelly	Labor	Bathurst	1925–1932, 1935–1967
Laurie Kelly	Labor	Bulli	1947–1955
Bill Lamb	Labor	Granville	1938–1962
Abe Landa	Labor	Bondi	1930–1965
Joe Lawson	Country	Murray	1932–1973
Ray Maher	Labor	North Sydney	1953–1965
Cliff Mallam (Note: Dulwich Hill Labor MLA George Weir resigned on 25 March 1953 to accept an appointment to the Industrial Relations Commission of New South Wales. Labor candidate Cliff Mallam won the resulting by-election on 20 June 1953.)	Labor	Dulwich Hill	1953–1968, 1971–1981
Jack Mannix	Labor	Liverpool	1952–1971
Clarrie Martin	Labor	Waverley	1930–1932, 1939–1953
Claude Matthews	Labor	Leichhardt	1934–1954
Ken McCaw	Liberal	Lane Cove	1947–1975
John McGrath	Labor	Rockdale	1941–1959
John McMahon	Labor	Balmain	1950–1968
Kevin Morgan	Labor	Parramatta	1953–1956
Pat Morton	Liberal	Mosman	1947–1972
Richard Murden	Liberal	Ashfield	1953–1959
Thomas Murphy	Labor	Concord	1953–1968
Leo Nott	Labor	Mudgee	1953–1973
Roger Nott	Labor	Liverpool Plains	1941–1961
Frank O'Neill	Labor	Georges River	1953–1956
Maurice O'Sullivan	Labor	Paddington	1927–1959
Doug Padman	Liberal	Albury	1947–1965
Leslie Parr	Liberal	Burwood	1951–1956
Blake Pelly	Liberal	Wollondilly	1950–1957
Spence Powell	Labor	Bankstown	1950–1962
Jack Renshaw	Labor	Castlereagh	1941–1980
Clarrie Robertson	Labor	Dubbo	1942–1950, 1953-1959
Ian Robinson	Country	Casino	1953–1963
Murray Robson	Liberal	Vaucluse	1936–1957
D'Arcy Rose	Country	Upper Hunter	1939–1959
Norm Ryan	Labor	Marrickville	1953–1973
John Seiffert	Labor	Monaro	1941–1965
Tom Shannon	Labor	Phillip	1927–1954
Bill Sheahan	Labor	Burrinjuck	1941–1973
Jim Simpson	Labor	Lake Macquarie	1950–1968
Stanley Stephens	Country	Byron	1944–1973
Sydney Storey	Liberal	Hornsby	1941–1962
Arthur Tonge	Labor	Canterbury	1926–1932, 1935–1962
Vernon Treatt	Liberal	Woollahra	1938–1962
Laurie Tully	Labor	Goulburn	1946–1965
Lou Walsh	Labor	Coogee	1953–1956, 1962–1965
William Wattison	Labor	Sturt	1947–1968
Bill Weiley (Note: Clarence Country Party MLA Cecil Wingfield died on 28 January 1955. Independent candidate Bill Weiley won the resulting by-election on 26 March 1955.)	Independent Country	Clarence	1955–1971
George Weir	Labor	Dulwich Hill	1941–1953
Ernest Wetherell	Labor	Cobar	1949–1965
Arthur Williams	Labor	East Hills	1940–1956
Eric Willis	Liberal	Earlwood	1950–1978
Cecil Wingfield	Country	Clarence	1938–1955
Stan Wyatt	Labor	Lakemba	1950–1964

== See also ==
- Second Cahill ministry
- Results of the 1953 New South Wales state election
- Candidates of the 1953 New South Wales state election
