= Candidates of the 1956 New South Wales state election =

This is a list of candidates of the 1956 New South Wales state election. The election was held on 3 March 1956.

== Retiring Members ==
=== Labor ===
- Robert Cameron (Waratah)
- Daniel Clyne (King)
- Edgar Dring (Auburn) died in December 1955; no by-election was held due to the proximity of the election.
- Arthur Williams (East Hills)

=== Liberal ===
- Walter Howarth (Maitland)
- Joseph Jackson (Nepean)

== Legislative Assembly ==
Sitting members are shown in bold text. Successful candidates are highlighted in the relevant colour.

Electorate	Held by	Labor candidate	Coalition candidate	Other candidates
Albury	Liberal	Robert White	**Doug Padman** (Lib)	
Armidale	Labor	**Jim Cahill**	Davis Hughes (CP)	
Ashfield	Liberal	James Brady	**Richard Murden** (Lib)	
Auburn	Labor	Thomas Ryan	John Steel (Lib)	Chris Lang (LL); Edward Spensley (Ind)
Balmain	Labor	**John McMahon**	Elton Lewis (Lib)	Stan Moran (CPA)
Bankstown	Labor	**Spence Powell**	Reginald Allsop (Lib)	Roy Boyd (CPA)
Barwon	Country	Gerard McInerney	**Geoff Crawford** (CP)	
Bathurst	Labor	**Gus Kelly**	Jack Toole (Lib)	
Blacktown	Labor	**John Freeman**	Graham Cullis (Lib)	
Bondi	Labor	**Abe Landa**	Daniel Sutherland (Lib)	
Bulli	Labor	**Rex Jackson**	Donald Heggie (Lib)	Bill McDougall (CPA)
Burrinjuck	Labor	**Bill Sheahan**	Allan Johnson (CP)	
Burwood	Liberal		**Leslie Parr** (Lib)	
Byron	Country		**Stanley Stephens** (CP)	Archibald Johnston (Ind)
Canterbury	Labor	**Arthur Tonge**	Cecil Ford (Lib)	
Casino	Country		**Ian Robinson** (CP)	
Castlereagh	Labor	**Jack Renshaw**	Norman Brown (CP)	
Cessnock	Labor	**John Crook**	Harold Hawkes (Lib)	David Stevenson (CPA)
Clarence	Country		Garth Munro (CP); **Bill Weiley** (CP)	
Cobar	Labor	**Ernest Wetherell**		
Collaroy	Liberal		**Robert Askin** (Lib)	Gordon Jones (Ind); Elfrida Morcom (CPA)
Concord	Labor	**Thomas Murphy**	Lerryn Mutton (Lib)	Leslie Greenfield (CPA)
Coogee	Labor	**Lou Walsh**	Kevin Ellis (Lib)	Tasman Crocker (Ind)
Cook's River	Labor	**Joseph Cahill**	James Skehan (Lib)	William Kendrick (Ind); Edward Rowe (CPA)
Croydon	Liberal	Frank Zions	**David Hunter** (Lib)	
Drummoyne	Labor	**Roy Jackson**	Walter Lawrence (Lib)	
Dubbo	Labor	**Clarrie Robertson**	Neville Magin (Lib); Keith Sullivan (CP)	
Dulwich Hill	Labor	**Cliff Mallam**	Lionel Corner (Lib)	
Earlwood	Liberal	David Connors	**Eric Willis** (Lib)	
East Hills	Labor	Joe Kelly	Harold Stalker (Lib)	Douglas Marshall (Ind)
Eastwood	Liberal		**Eric Hearnshaw** (Lib)	
Fairfield	Labor	**Clarrie Earl**	Guy Holmes (Lib)	Edwin Lipscombe (CPA)
George's River	Labor	**Frank O'Neill**	Douglas Cross (Lib)	Paul Mortier (CPA)
Gloucester	Country	Thomas Breen	**Ray Fitzgerald** (CP)	
Gordon	Liberal		**Stewart Fraser** (Lib)	
Gosford	Liberal	Rupert Wallace	**Harold Jackson** (Lib)	Alan Brackenreg (CPA); Roy Jackson (Ind); Leslie Moffat (Ind)
Goulburn	Labor	**Laurie Tully**	Ray Bladwell (Lib)	
Granville	Labor	**Bill Lamb**	Bob Mutton (Lib)	Rupert Lockwood (CPA)
Hamilton	Labor	**George Campbell**	Horace Smith (Lib)	
Hartley	Ind Labor	Jim Robson		William Black (Ind Lab); Leslie Cant (Ind); John King (CPA); Neville Weekes (Ind)
Hawkesbury	Liberal	John Grinham	**Bernie Deane** (Lib)	
Hornsby	Liberal	Francis O'Connell	**Sydney Storey** (Lib)	
Hurstville	Labor	**Clive Evatt**	Hedley Mallard (Lib)	Edward Merryfull (Ind)
Illawarra	Labor	**Howard Fowles**	Adrian O'Donnell (Lib)	David Bowen (CPA)
Kahibah	Independent	Robert McCartney	Joseph Richley (Lib)	**Tom Armstrong** (Ind Lab)
King	Labor	Albert Sloss	Roberta Galagher (Lib)	Michael Callinan (LL); Ron Maxwell (CPA)
Kogarah	Labor	**Bill Crabtree**	Horace Harper (Lib)	
Kurri Kurri	Labor	**George Booth**	Stanley Mettam (Lib)	
Lake Macquarie	Labor	**Jim Simpson**	Edward Farrell (Lib)	William Quinn (CPA)
Lakemba	Labor	**Stan Wyatt**	John Whelan (Lib)	James Staples (CPA)
Lane Cove	Liberal	Geoffrey O'Donnell	**Ken McCaw** (Lib)	
Leichhardt	Labor	**Reg Coady**	Barney Morton (Lib)	
Lismore	Country	Archibald McEwan	**Jack Easter** (CP)	Constance Wilson (Ind)
Liverpool	Labor	**Jack Mannix**		
Liverpool Plains	Labor	**Roger Nott**	Henry Gregson (Lib); Geoffrey Thomas (CP)	John Pender (Ind)
Maitland	Liberal	Cecil Robinson	Milton Morris (Lib)	Ted Fletcher (Ind); Henry Ivins (Ind); Leonard Neville (Ind Lib)
Manly	Liberal	John Wilson	**Douglas Darby** (Lib)	
Maroubra	Labor	**Bob Heffron**	Wallace Peacock (Lib)	
Marrickville	Labor	**Norm Ryan**	Ian Chisholm (Lib)	William McCristal (RP); Adam Ogston (CPA)
Monaro	Labor	**John Seiffert**	Ernest Smith (Lib); Frederick Von Nida (CP)	
Mosman	Liberal	Malcolm Stuart-Robertson	**Pat Morton** (Lib)	
Mudgee	Labor	**Leo Nott**	Eric Hennessy (Lib); Kenneth Masters (CP)	
Murray	Country	Willie Peters	**Joe Lawson** (CP)	
Murrumbidgee	Labor	**George Enticknap**	Michael Cudmore (CP)	
Nepean	Liberal	Alfred Bennett	Bill Chapman (Lib)	**Jim Chalmers** (Ind Lab); Mel McCalman (CPA)
Neutral Bay	Liberal	Donald Gray	**Ivan Black** (Lib)	
Newcastle	Labor	**Frank Hawkins**	Iris Hyde (Lib)	Mervyn Copley (CPA)
North Sydney	Labor	**Ray Maher**	Peter Murphy (Lib)	Bill Wood (CPA)
Orange	Country	Louie Cassey	**Charles Cutler** (CP)	Cecil Connors (CPA)
Oxley	Country	William Kennewell	**Les Jordan** (CP)	Joe Cordner (Ind)
Paddington	Labor	**Maurice O'Sullivan**	Rodney Craigie (Lib)	Bill Brown (CPA)
Parramatta	Labor	**Kevin Morgan**	Jim Clough (Lib)	
Phillip	Labor	**Pat Hills**		Francis Mohan (LL); Robert Webster (CPA)
Raleigh	Country		**Radford Gamack** (CP)	
Randwick	Labor	**William Gollan**	Charles De Monchaux (Lib)	Kenneth O'Hara (CPA)
Redfern	Labor	**Fred Green**		Arthur Shipton (CPA)
Rockdale	Labor	**John McGrath**	Harold Heslehurst (Lib)	
Ryde	Labor	**Frank Downing**	Francis Collings (Lib)	
South Coast	Liberal	Allan Beaton	**Jack Beale** (Lib)	
Sturt	Labor	**William Wattison**		William Flynn (CPA); John Fox (Ind)
Sutherland	Labor	**Tom Dalton**	Ian Griffith (Lib)	
Tamworth	Country	Arthur Foran	**Bill Chaffey** (CP)	
Temora	Country	Hector Skidmore	**Doug Dickson** (CP)	
Tenterfield	Country		**Michael Bruxner** (CP)	
Upper Hunter	Country	Albert Khan	**D'Arcy Rose** (CP)	
Vaucluse	Liberal		**Murray Robson** (Lib)	Alfred Elboz (Ind)
Wagga Wagga	Labor	**Eddie Graham**	Wal Fife (Lib)	
Waratah	Labor	Harry Sheedy		Frank Purdue (Ind)
Waratah	Labor	Harry Sheedy		Harry Edwards (Ind); Thomas Graham (CPA)
Waverley	Labor	**William Ferguson**	John Steinwede (Lib)	Eddie Maher (CPA)
Willoughby	Liberal	Anthony Coates	**George Brain** (Lib)	
Wollondilly	Liberal	Ernest Seager	**Blake Pelly** (Lib)	
Wollongong-Kembla	Labor	**Rex Connor**	Robert Albert (Lib)	George Parker (Ind)
Woollahra	Liberal		**Vernon Treatt** (Lib)	George Mason (Ind)
Young	Labor	**Fred Cahill**	George Freudenstein (CP); Raymond Oliver (Lib)	

== See also ==
- Members of the New South Wales Legislative Assembly, 1956–1959
