= Candidates of the 1953 New South Wales state election =

This is a list of candidates of the 1953 New South Wales state election. The election was held on 14 February 1953.

== Retiring Members ==
=== Labor ===
- Carlo Lazzarini (Marrickville) had died in late 1952 but no by-election was held.
- Arthur Greenup (Newtown-Annandale) the district was abolished in the 1952 redistribution, and he was defeated in the preselection contest for Marrickville.

=== Liberal ===
- Harry Turner (Gordon) had resigned in late 1952 to run for a federal seat. No by-election was held.
- George Gollan (Parramatta).

=== Country ===
- Roy Vincent (Raleigh).

== Legislative Assembly ==
Sitting members are shown in bold text. Successful candidates are highlighted in the relevant colour.

Electorate	Held by	Labor candidate	Coalition candidate	Other candidates
Albury	Liberal	**Frank Finnan**	**Doug Padman** (Lib)	
Armidale	Country	Jim Cahill	**Davis Hughes** (CP)	
Ashfield	Labor	**Jack Richardson**	Richard Murden (Lib)	
Auburn	Labor	**Edgar Dring**		Chris Lang (LL)
Balmain	Labor	**John McMahon**		Arthur Doughty (Ind); Stan Moran (CPA)
Bankstown	Labor	**Spence Powell**		Claude Jones (CPA)
Barwon	Country	Gerard McInerney	**Geoff Crawford** (CP)	
Bathurst	Labor	**Gus Kelly**		
Blacktown	Labor	**John Freeman**	George Walker (Lib)	Mel McCalman (CPA)
Bondi	Labor	**Abe Landa**	Les Fingleton (Lib)	
Bulli	Labor	**Laurie Kelly**		Sara Phipps (CPA)
Burrinjuck	Labor	**Bill Sheahan**	Robert Stewart (CP)	John Cusack (Ind); Barney Morton (Ind)
Burwood	Liberal	William Weiss	**Leslie Parr** (Lib)	
Byron	Country		**Stanley Stephens** (CP)	
Canterbury	Labor	**Arthur Tonge**	Donald Arthur (Lib)	Roy Boyd (CPA)
Casino	Country	William Young	Ian Robinson (CP)	
Casino	Country	William Young	William Cooke (CP); **John Reid** (CP)	
Castlereagh	Labor	**Jack Renshaw**	Keith Sullivan (CP)	
Cessnock	Labor	**John Crook**		John Tapp (CPA)
Clarence	Country	George Russell	**Cecil Wingfield** (CP)	Kenneth Harding (CPA)
Cobar	Labor	**Ernest Wetherell**		
Collaroy	Liberal	Evelyn Barron	**Robert Askin** (Lib)	
Concord	Liberal	Thomas Murphy	**John Adamson** (Lib)	
Coogee	Liberal	Lou Walsh	**Kevin Ellis** (Lib)	
Cook's River	Labor	**Joseph Cahill**		
Croydon	Liberal	Kenneth Guthrie	**David Hunter** (Lib)	
Drummoyne	Liberal	Roy Jackson	**Robert Dewley** (Lib)	
Dubbo	Country	Clarrie Robertson	**Robert Medcalf** (CP)	
Dulwich Hill	Labor	**George Weir**	Basil Mottershead (Lib)	
Earlwood	Liberal	Arthur Higgins	**Eric Willis** (Lib)	
East Hills	notional Labor	**Arthur Williams**	Armand Macquart (Lib)	
Eastwood	Liberal	Francis Corcoran	**Eric Hearnshaw** (Lib)	Francis Collings (Ind)
Fairfield	notional Labor	Clarrie Earl		Edwin Lipscombe (CPA)
George's River	Labor	Frank O'Neill	Samuel Warren (Lib)	
Gloucester	Country	Percy Randle	**Ray Fitzgerald** (CP)	
Gordon	Liberal		Stewart Fraser (Lib)	
Gosford	Liberal	Rupert Wallace	**Harold Jackson** (Lib)	
Goulburn	Labor	**Laurie Tully**	Pat Osborne (Lib)	
Granville	Labor	**Bill Lamb**		Albert Williams (CPA)
Hamilton	Labor	**George Campbell**	John Milne (Lib)	
Hartley	Labor	James Punch		**Jim Chalmers*** (Ind Lab); John King (CPA)
Hawkesbury	Liberal	John Egan	**Bernie Deane** (Lib)	
Hornsby	Liberal		**Sydney Storey** (Lib)	Leslie Matthews (Ind); Victor Taylor (Ind)
Hurstville	Labor	**Clive Evatt**	Bill Arthur (Lib)	
Illawarra	Labor	**Howard Fowles**		
Kahibah	Labor	**Joshua Arthur**	Inglis Alexander (Lib)	
King	Labor	**Daniel Clyne**	Roberta Galagher (Lib)	
Kogarah	Liberal	Bill Crabtree	**Douglas Cross** (Lib)	
Kurri Kurri	Labor	**George Booth**		
Lake Macquarie	Labor	**Jim Simpson**		
Lakemba	Labor	**Stan Wyatt**	George Chambers (Lib)	
Lane Cove	Liberal	Alan Bagot	**Ken McCaw** (Lib)	
Leichhardt	Labor	**Claude Matthews**	William Cole (Lib)	
Lismore	Country	Donald Watson	Jack Easter (CP)	
Lismore	Country	Donald Watson	**William Frith** (CP)	
Liverpool	Labor	**Jack Mannix**	Madge Lee (Lib)	
Liverpool Plains	Labor	**Roger Nott**	Frank O'Keefe (CP); James Reeves (Lib)	
Maitland	Liberal	Leonard Neville	**Walter Howarth** (Lib)	
Manly	Liberal	Malcolm Stuart-Robertson	**Douglas Darby** (Lib)	
Maroubra	Labor	**Bob Heffron**		
Marrickville	Labor	Norm Ryan		William McCristal (Ind)
Monaro	Ind Labor	**John Seiffert**	Ernest Smith (Lib)	
Mosman	Liberal	Edna Ryan	**Pat Morton** (Lib)	
Mudgee	Country	Leo Nott	**Frederick Cooke** (CP)	
Murray	Country	Francis Holden	**Joe Lawson** (CP)	
Murrumbidgee	Labor	**George Enticknap**	Richard Cuthbert (CP)	
Nepean	Liberal	Alexander Liston	**Joseph Jackson** (Lib)	
Neutral Bay	Liberal		**Ivan Black** (Lib)	
Newcastle	Labor	**Frank Hawkins**		Doug Olive (CPA)
North Sydney	Ind Labor	Ray Maher	Trevor Humphries (Lib)	**James Geraghty** (Ind Lab); Norman Jacobs (Ind)
Orange	Country	Louie Cassey	**Charles Cutler** (CP)	
Oxley	Country	William Kennewell	**Les Jordan** (CP)	Alan Borthwick (Ind); Joe Cordner (Ind)
Paddington	Labor	**Maurice O'Sullivan**		Bill Brown (CPA)
Parramatta	Labor	Kevin Morgan	Arthur Butterell (Lib)	Edward Harding (Ind)
Phillip	Labor	**Tom Shannon**		
Raleigh	Country	Clyde Reid	William Burns (CP); Radford Gamack (CP)	Gordon Patterson (Ind)
Randwick	Labor	**William Gollan**	George Goodwin (Lib)	
Redfern	Labor	**Fred Green**		Harry Hatfield (CPA)
Rockdale	Labor	**John McGrath**	Harold Heslehurst (Lib)	
Ryde	Liberal	Frank Downing	**Ken Anderson** (Lib)	
South Coast	Liberal	Alfred Berriman	**Jack Beale** (Lib)	
Sturt	Labor	**William Wattison**		
Sutherland	Liberal	Tom Dalton	**Cecil Monro** (Lib)	
Tamworth	Country	William Scully	**Bill Chaffey** (CP)	
Temora	Country	Hector Skidmore	**Doug Dickson** (CP)	
Tenterfield	Country	Frederick Cowley	**Michael Bruxner** (CP)	
Upper Hunter	Country	George McGuirk	**D'Arcy Rose** (CP)	
Vaucluse	Liberal		**Murray Robson** (Lib)	
Wagga Wagga	Labor	**Eddie Graham**	Wal Fife (Lib); William Wright (CP)	Les Kelton (CPA)
Waratah	Labor	**Robert Cameron**		Alfred Hodge (Ind)
Waverley	Labor	**Clarrie Martin**	Ben Doig (Lib)	
Willoughby	Liberal	Joseph McNally	**George Brain** (Lib)	
Wollondilly	Liberal	Albert Hughes	**Blake Pelly** (Lib)	
Wollongong-Kembla	Labor	**Rex Connor**		William Harkness (CPA); George Parker (Ind)
Woollahra	Liberal	Norman Jacobs	**Vernon Treatt** (Lib)	
Young	Labor	**Fred Cahill**	Reg Hailstone (CP)	

== See also ==
- Members of the New South Wales Legislative Assembly, 1953–1956
