= Members of the New South Wales Legislative Assembly, 1956–1959 =

Members of the New South Wales Legislative Assembly who served in the 38th parliament held their seats from 1956 to 1959. They were elected at the 1956 state election, and at by-elections. The Speaker was Bill Lamb.

Name	Party	Electorate	Term in office
Tom Armstrong (Note: Kahibah independent MLA Tom Armstrong died on 16 March 1957. Labor candidate Jack Stewart won the resulting by-election on 13 April.)	Independent Labor	Kahibah	1953–1957
Robert Askin	Liberal	Collaroy	1950–1975
Jack Beale	Liberal	South Coast	1942–1973
Ivan Black	Liberal	Neutral Bay	1945–1951, 1951–1962
George Booth	Labor	Kurri Kurri	1925–1960
George Brain	Liberal	Willoughby	1943–1968
Michael Bruxner	Country	Tenterfield	1920–1962
Fred Cahill	Labor	Young	1941–1959
Joseph Cahill	Labor	Cook's River	1925–1959
George Campbell	Labor	Hamilton	1950–1959
Bill Chaffey	Country	Tamworth	1940–1973
Bill Chapman	Liberal	Nepean	1956–1962
Jim Clough	Liberal	Parramatta	1956–1959, 1965–1988
Reg Coady	Labor	Leichhardt	1954–1973
Rex Connor	Labor	Wollongong-Kembla	1950–1963
Geoffrey Cox (Note: Vaucluse Liberal MLA Murray Robson resigned on 2 July 1957. Liberal candidate Geoffrey Cox won the resulting by-election on 24 August.)	Liberal	Vaucluse	1957–1964
Bill Crabtree	Labor	Kogarah	1953–1983
Geoff Crawford	Country	Barwon	1950–1976
John Crook	Labor	Cessnock	1949–1959
Douglas Cross	Liberal	Georges River	1948–1953, 1956–1970
Charles Cutler	Country	Orange	1947–1975
Douglas Darby	Liberal	Manly	1945–1978
Bernie Deane	Liberal	Hawkesbury	1950–1972
Doug Dickson	Country	Temora	1938–1960
Ben Doig (Note: Burwood Liberal MLA Leslie Parr died on 3 December 1956. Liberal candidate Ben Doig won the resulting by-election on 16 February 1957.)	Liberal	Burwood	1957–1965
Frank Downing	Labor	Ryde	1953–1968
Clarrie Earl	Labor	Fairfield	1953–1973
Jack Easter	Country	Lismore	1953–1959
Kevin Ellis	Liberal	Coogee	1948–1953, 1956–1973
George Enticknap	Labor	Murrumbidgee	1941–1965
Clive Evatt (Note: Hurstville MLA Clive Evatt was expelled from the Labor Party on 13 July 1956 for his continued public criticism of Premier Cahill. He served out his term as an independent.)	Labor/Independent	Hurstville	1939–1959
William Ferguson	Labor	Waverley	1953–1961
Wal Fife (Note: Wagga Wagga Labor MLA Eddie Graham died on 13 November 1957. Liberal candidate Wal Fife won the resulting by-election on 14 December.)	Liberal	Wagga Wagga	1957–1975
Ray Fitzgerald	Country	Gloucester	1941–1962
Howard Fowles	Labor	Illawarra	1941–1968
Stewart Fraser	Liberal	Gordon	1953–1962
John Freeman	Labor	Blacktown	1945–1959
Radford Gamack	Country	Raleigh	1953–1959
William Gollan	Labor	Randwick	1941–1962
Eddie Graham	Labor	Wagga Wagga	1941–1957
Fred Green	Labor	Redfern	1950–1968
Ian Griffith	Liberal	Sutherland	1956–1978
Frank Hawkins	Labor	Newcastle	1935–1968
Eric Hearnshaw	Liberal	Eastwood	1945–1965
Robert Heffron	Labor	Maroubra	1930–1968
Pat Hills	Labor	Phillip	1954–1988
Davis Hughes	Country	Armidale	1950–1953, 1956–1973
David Hunter	Liberal	Croydon	1940–1976
Harold Jackson	Liberal	Gosford	1950–1965
Rex Jackson	Labor	Bulli	1955–1986
Les Jordan	Country	Oxley	1944–1965
Gus Kelly	Labor	Bathurst	1925–1932, 1935–1967
Joe Kelly	Labor	East Hills	1956–1973
Bill Lamb	Labor	Granville	1938–1962
Abe Landa	Labor	Bondi	1930–1965
Walter Lawrence	Liberal	Drummoyne	1956–1962
Joe Lawson	Country	Murray	1932–1973
Tom Lewis (Note: Wollondilly Liberal MLA Blake Pelly resigned on 19 September 1957. Liberal candidate Tom Lewis won the resulting by-election on 26 October.)	Liberal	Wollondilly	1957–1978
Ray Maher	Labor	North Sydney	1953–1965
Cliff Mallam	Labor	Dulwich Hill	1953–1968, 1971–1981
Jack Mannix	Labor	Liverpool	1952–1971
Ken McCaw	Liberal	Lane Cove	1947–1975
John McGrath	Labor	Rockdale	1941–1959
John McMahon	Labor	Balmain	1950–1968
Milton Morris	Liberal	Maitland	1956–1980
Pat Morton	Liberal	Mosman	1947–1972
Richard Murden	Liberal	Ashfield	1953–1959
Thomas Murphy	Labor	Concord	1953–1968
Leo Nott	Labor	Mudgee	1953–1973
Roger Nott	Labor	Liverpool Plains	1941–1961
Maurice O'Sullivan	Labor	Paddington	1927–1959
Doug Padman	Liberal	Albury	1947–1965
Leslie Parr	Liberal	Burwood	1951–1956
Blake Pelly	Liberal	Wollondilly	1950–1957
Spence Powell	Labor	Bankstown	1950–1962
Frank Purdue	Independent	Waratah	1956–1962, 1964–1965
Jack Renshaw	Labor	Castlereagh	1941–1980
Clarrie Robertson	Labor	Dubbo	1942–1950, 1953-1959
Ian Robinson	Country	Casino	1953–1963
Murray Robson	Country	Vaucluse	1936–1957
Jim Robson	Labor	Hartley	1956–1965
D'Arcy Rose	Country	Upper Hunter	1939–1959
Norm Ryan	Labor	Marrickville	1953–1973
Thomas Ryan	Labor	Auburn	1956–1965
John Seiffert	Labor	Monaro	1941–1965
Bill Sheahan	Labor	Burrinjuck	1941–1973
Jim Simpson	Labor	Lake Macquarie	1950–1968
Albert Sloss	Labor	King	1956–1973
Stanley Stephens	Country	Byron	1944–1973
Jack Stewart	Labor	Kahibah	1957–1972
Sydney Storey	Liberal	Hornsby	1941–1962
Arthur Tonge	Labor	Canterbury	1926–1932, 1935–1962
Vernon Treatt	Liberal	Woollahra	1938–1962
Laurie Tully	Labor	Goulburn	1946–1965
William Wattison	Labor	Sturt	1947–1968
Bill Weiley	Country	Clarence	1955–1971
Ernest Wetherell	Labor	Cobar	1949–1965
Eric Willis	Liberal	Earlwood	1950–1978
Stan Wyatt	Labor	Lakemba	1950–1964

== See also ==
- Third Cahill ministry
- Results of the 1956 New South Wales state election
- Candidates of the 1956 New South Wales state election
