= Electoral results for the district of Kahibah =

Election results for Kahibah, New South Wales, Australia

Kahibah, an electoral district of the Legislative Assembly in the Australian state of New South Wales, has had three incarnations, the first from 1894 to 1920, the second from 1927 to 1930 and the third from 1950 to 1971.

| Term | Member | Party |
|---|---|---|
| 1894 | Alfred Edden | Labour |
| 1895 | Alfred Edden | Labour |
| 1898 | Alfred Edden | Labour |
| 1901 | Alfred Edden | Labour |
| 1904 | Alfred Edden | Labour |
| 1907 | Alfred Edden | Labour |
| 1910 | Alfred Edden | Labour |
| 1913 | Alfred Edden | Labour |
| 1917 | Alfred Edden | Nationalist |
| Term | Member | Party |
| 1927 | Hugh Connell | Labor |
| Term | Member | Party |
| 1950 | Joshua Arthur | Labor |
| 1953 by | Tom Armstrong | Independent Labor |
| 1956 | Tom Armstrong | Independent Labor |
| 1957 by | Jack Stewart | Labor |
| 1959 | Jack Stewart | Labor |
| 1962 | Jack Stewart | Labor |
| 1965 | Jack Stewart | Labor |
| 1968 | Jack Stewart | Labor |

== Election results ==
=== Elections in the 1960s ===
==== 1968 ====
1968 New South Wales state election: Kahibah
| Party | Candidate | Votes | % | ±% |
|---|---|---|---|---|
| Labor | Jack Stewart | 12,949 | 58.5 | −5.1 |
| Liberal | Roy Hammond | 7,166 | 32.4 | −4.1 |
| Democratic Labor | William Crane | 1,055 | 4.8 | +4.8 |
| Communist | Darrell Dawson | 691 | 3.1 | +3.1 |
| Independent | William Fricker | 259 | 1.2 | +1.2 |
| Total formal votes | | 22,120 | 97.6 | |
| Informal votes | | 540 | 2.4 | |
| Turnout | | 22,660 | 95.2 | |
Two-party-preferred result
| Labor | Jack Stewart | 13,843 | 62.6 | −1.0 |
| Liberal | Roy Hammond | 8,277 | 37.4 | +1.0 |
| Labor hold | | Swing | −1.0 | |

==== 1965 ====
1965 New South Wales state election: Kahibah
| Party | Candidate | Votes | % | ±% |
|---|---|---|---|---|
| Labor | Jack Stewart | 11,740 | 55.6 | −6.1 |
| Liberal | Wallace MacDonald | 9,384 | 44.4 | +44.4 |
| Total formal votes | | 21,124 | 98.5 | 0.0 |
| Informal votes | | 311 | 1.5 | 0.0 |
| Turnout | | 21,435 | 95.5 | +0.1 |
| Labor hold | | Swing | N/A | |

==== 1962 ====
1962 New South Wales state election: Kahibah
| Party | Candidate | Votes | % | ±% |
|---|---|---|---|---|
| Labor | Jack Stewart | 12,011 | 61.7 | −2.1 |
| Independent | Wallace MacDonald | 7,473 | 38.3 | +38.3 |
| Total formal votes | | 19,484 | 98.5 | |
| Informal votes | | 298 | 1.5 | |
| Turnout | | 19,782 | 95.4 | |
| Labor hold | | Swing | −2.1 | |

=== Elections in the 1950s ===
==== 1959 ====
1959 New South Wales state election: Kahibah
| Party | Candidate | Votes | % | ±% |
|---|---|---|---|---|
| Labor | Jack Stewart | 11,908 | 63.7 | |
| Liberal | Eric Cupit | 6,790 | 36.3 | |
| Total formal votes | | 18,698 | 98.4 | |
| Informal votes | | 311 | 1.6 | |
| Turnout | | 19,009 | 95.5 | |
| Labor gain from Independent Labor | | Swing | | |

Tom Armstrong (Independent Labor) died and Jack Stewart (Labor) won the resulting by-election.

==== 1957 by-election ====
1957 Kahibah by-election Saturday 13 April
| Party | Candidate | Votes | % | ±% |
|---|---|---|---|---|
| Labor | Jack Stewart | 9,232 | 51.9 | |
| Liberal | Joseph Richley | 4,407 | 24.8 | |
| Democratic Labor | John Daley | 2,687 | 15.1 | |
| Independent | Ethelene James | 1,451 | 8.2 | |
| Total formal votes | | 17,777 | 98.3 | |
| Informal votes | | 303 | 1.7 | |
| Turnout | | 18,080 | 91.2 | |
| Labor hold | | Swing | N/A | |

Tom Armstrong (Independent Labor) died.

==== 1956 ====
1956 New South Wales state election: Kahibah
| Party | Candidate | Votes | % | ±% |
|---|---|---|---|---|
| Labor | Robert McCartney | 7,238 | 39.0 | −25.7 |
| Independent Labor | Tom Armstrong | 6,195 | 33.4 | +33.4 |
| Liberal | Joseph Richley | 5,129 | 27.6 | −7.7 |
| Total formal votes | | 18,562 | 98.9 | +3.1 |
| Informal votes | | 213 | 1.1 | −3.1 |
| Turnout | | 18,775 | 95.9 | −0.1 |
Two-candidate-preferred result
| Independent Labor | Tom Armstrong | 10,618 | 57.2 | +57.2 |
| Labor | Robert McCartney | 7,944 | 42.8 | −21.9 |
| Independent Labor gain from Labor | | Swing | N/A | |

Joshua Arthur (Labor) resigned as a result of the Royal Commission concerning his relationship with Reginald Doyle. Tom Armstrong (Independent Labor) won the resulting by-election.

==== 1953 by-election ====
1953 Kahibah by-election Saturday 31 October
| Party | Candidate | Votes | % | ±% |
|---|---|---|---|---|
| Independent | Tom Armstrong | 5,706 | 34.67 | +34.67 |
| Liberal | Harry Quinlan | 5,144 | 31.26 | −4.07 |
| Labor | Joshua Arthur, Sr. | 4,059 | 24.67 | −40.00 |
| Independent | Inglis Alexander | 1,101 | 6.69 | +6.69 |
| Communist | Douglas Olive | 446 | 2.71 | +2.71 |
| Total formal votes | | 16,456 | | |
| Informal votes | | 428 | 2.53 | |
| Turnout | | 16,884 | 88.82 | |
Two-candidate-preferred result
| Independent | Tom Armstrong | 10,647 | 64.70 | +64.70 |
| Liberal | Harry Quinlan | 5,809 | 35.30 | −0.03 |
| Independent gain from Labor | | Swing | N/A | |

Joshua Arthur (Labor) was forced to resign after a Royal Commission found his dealings with Reginald Doyle were improper. The by-election was a disastrous defeat for Labor in one of their safest seats.

==== 1953 ====
1953 New South Wales state election: Kahibah
| Party | Candidate | Votes | % | ±% |
|---|---|---|---|---|
| Labor | Joshua Arthur | 11,093 | 64.7 | |
| Liberal | Inglis Alexander | 6,061 | 35.3 | |
| Total formal votes | | 17,154 | 95.8 | |
| Informal votes | | 759 | 4.2 | |
| Turnout | | 17,913 | 96.0 | |
| Labor hold | | Swing | | |

==== 1950 ====
1950 New South Wales state election: Kahibah
| Party | Candidate | Votes | % | ±% |
|---|---|---|---|---|
| Labor | Joshua Arthur | 12,633 | 69.3 | |
| Liberal | William Bourke | 5,608 | 30.7 | |
| Total formal votes | | 18,241 | 99.0 | |
| Informal votes | | 181 | 1.0 | |
| Turnout | | 18,422 | 95.3 | |
| Labor notional hold | | | | |

District recreated

==== 1930 - 1950 ====
District abolished

=== Elections in the 1920s ===
==== 1927 ====
1927 New South Wales state election: Kahibah
| Party | Candidate | Votes | % | ±% |
|---|---|---|---|---|
| Labor | Hugh Connell | 9,228 | 72.6 | |
| Nationalist | Arthur Ashton | 3,480 | 27.4 | |
| Total formal votes | | 12,708 | 99.2 | |
| Informal votes | | 108 | 0.8 | |
| Turnout | | 12,816 | 83.2 | |
| Labor win | | (new seat) | | |

District recreated

==== 1920 - 1927 ====
District abolished

=== Elections in the 1910s ===
==== 1917 ====
1917 New South Wales state election: Kahibah
| Party | Candidate | Votes | % | ±% |
|---|---|---|---|---|
| Nationalist | Alfred Edden | 3,728 | 48.5 | +15.1 |
| Labor | Hugh Connell | 3,724 | 48.5 | −16.9 |
| Independent | William Ellis | 234 | 3.0 | +3.0 |
| Total formal votes | | 7,686 | 99.1 | +1.7 |
| Informal votes | | 67 | 0.9 | −1.7 |
| Turnout | | 7,753 | 63.2 | −1.1 |

1917 New South Wales state election: Kahibah - Second Round
| Party | Candidate | Votes | % | ±% |
|---|---|---|---|---|
| Nationalist | Alfred Edden | 4,396 | 51.0 | |
| Labor | Hugh Connell | 4,216 | 49.0 | |
| Total formal votes | | 8,612 | 99.6 | +0.5 |
| Informal votes | | 36 | 0.4 | −0.5 |
| Turnout | | 8,648 | 70.5 | +7.3 |
| Member changed to Nationalist from Labor | | | | |

The sitting member Alfred Edden was expelled from Labor in the November 1916 Labor split over conscription.

==== 1913 ====
1913 New South Wales state election: Kahibah
| Party | Candidate | Votes | % | ±% |
|---|---|---|---|---|
| Labor | Alfred Edden | 4,407 | 65.4 | |
| Liberal Reform | William Ellis | 2,253 | 33.4 | |
| Country Party Association | Edgar de Lough | 77 | 1.1 | |
| Total formal votes | | 6,737 | 97.4 | |
| Informal votes | | 183 | 2.6 | |
| Turnout | | 6,920 | 64.3 | |
| Labor hold | | | | |

==== 1910 ====
1910 New South Wales state election: Kahibah
| Party | Candidate | Votes | % | ±% |
|---|---|---|---|---|
| Labour | Alfred Edden | 4,159 | 84.6 | |
| Liberal Reform | Walter Clutton | 760 | 15.4 | |
| Total formal votes | | 4,919 | 98.1 | |
| Informal votes | | 98 | 1.9 | |
| Turnout | | 5,017 | 65.6 | |
| Labour hold | | | | |

=== Elections in the 1900s ===
==== 1907 ====
1907 New South Wales state election: Kahibah
| Party | Candidate | Votes | % | ±% |
|---|---|---|---|---|
| Labour | Alfred Edden | Unopposed | | |
| Labour hold | | | | |

==== 1904 ====
1904 New South Wales state election: Kahibah
| Party | Candidate | Votes | % | ±% |
|---|---|---|---|---|
| Labour | Alfred Edden | 1,966 | 87.4 | |
| Independent Liberal | John Bailey | 283 | 12.6 | |
| Total formal votes | | 2,249 | 99.1 | |
| Informal votes | | 21 | 0.9 | |
| Turnout | | 2,270 | 31.6 | |
| Labour hold | | | | |

Kahibah was expanded to include part of Waratah and the abolished seat of Newcastle West. The member for Kahibah was Alfred Edden (Labour). The member for Newcastle West was Owen Gilbert (Liberal Reform) who unsuccessfully contested Wickham while the member for Waratah was Matthew Charlton (Labour) who successfully contested Northumberland.

==== 1901 ====
1901 New South Wales state election: Kahibah
| Party | Candidate | Votes | % | ±% |
|---|---|---|---|---|
| Labour | Alfred Edden | 1,218 | 89.5 | +24.5 |
| Independent Liberal | John Bailey | 143 | 10.5 | |
| Total formal votes | | 1,361 | 100.0 | +0.3 |
| Informal votes | | 0 | 0.0 | −0.3 |
| Turnout | | 1,369 | 54.1 | −5.1 |
| Labour hold | | | | |

=== Elections in the 1890s ===
==== 1898 ====
1898 New South Wales colonial election: Kahibah
| Party | Candidate | Votes | % | ±% |
|---|---|---|---|---|
| Labour | Alfred Edden | 843 | 65.0 | |
| Independent Federalist | William Richardson | 38 | 2.9 | |
| National Federal | Oswald Steel | 356 | 27.5 | |
| Independent | William Williams | 60 | 4.6 | |
| Total formal votes | | 1,297 | 99.2 | |
| Informal votes | | 11 | 0.8 | |
| Turnout | | 1,308 | 59.1 | |
| Labour hold | | | | |

==== 1895 ====
1895 New South Wales colonial election: Kahibah
| Party | Candidate | Votes | % | ±% |
|---|---|---|---|---|
| Labour | Alfred Edden | unopposed | | |
| Member changed to Labour from Independent Labour | | | | |

Alfred Edden left Labor in 1891 over the question of the solidarity pledge and was elected as an Independent Labour member in 1894 and rejoined Labour before this election.

==== 1894 ====
1894 New South Wales colonial election: Kahibah
| Party | Candidate | Votes | % | ±% |
|---|---|---|---|---|
| Independent Labour | Alfred Edden | 1,041 | 54.7 | |
| Independent | John Penman | 364 | 19.1 | |
| Labour | George Errington | 355 | 18.7 | |
| Ind. Free Trade | William Case | 70 | 3.7 | |
| Independent | William Williams | 41 | 2.2 | |
| Ind. Free Trade | Joseph Gorrick | 31 | 1.6 | |
| Total formal votes | | 1,902 | 98.1 | |
| Informal votes | | 37 | 1.9 | |
| Turnout | | 1,939 | 91.0 | |
| Independent Labour win | | (new seat) | | |
