= 1956 New South Wales state election =

State election for New South Wales, Australia in March 1956

← 1953	3 March 1956	1959 →

All 94 seats in the New South Wales Legislative Assembly 48 Assembly seats were needed for a majority
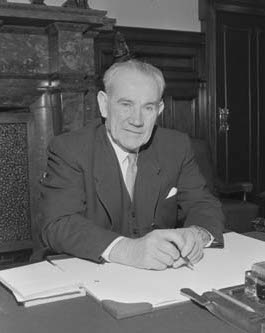

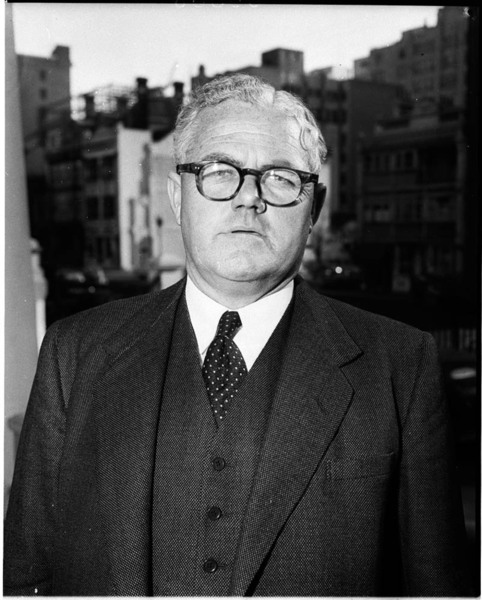
	First party	Second party
Leader	Joseph Cahill	Pat Morton
Party	Labor	Liberal/Country coalition
Leader since	2 April 1952	20 September 1955
Leader's seat	Cook's River	Mosman
Last election	57 seats	36 seats
Seats won	50	42
Seat change	▼7	▲6
Percentage	47.25%	46.25%
Swing	▼7.78	▲6.71
- Two-candidate-preferred margin by electorate
Premier before election
Joseph Cahill
Labor
Elected Premier
Joseph Cahill
Labor

The 1956 New South Wales state election was held on 3 March 1956. It was conducted in single member constituencies with compulsory preferential voting and was held on boundaries created at a 1952 redistribution. The election was for all of the 94 seats in the Legislative Assembly.

== Key dates ==
Date	Event
6 February 1956	The Legislative Assembly was dissolved, and writs were issued by the Governor to proceed with an election.
10 February 1956	Nominations for candidates for the election closed at noon.
3 March 1956	Polling day.
15 March 1956	Third Cahill ministry sworn in.
5 April 1956	Last day for the writs to be returned and the results formally declared.
10 April 1956	Opening of 38th Parliament.

== Issues ==
In March 1956, Labor had been in power for 15 years and Joseph Cahill who had won a landslide victory at the 1953 election had been premier for 4 years. Cahill, who was commonly known as "old smoothie" had been a popular premier and had shown some flair in leadership by announcing a design competition for the Sydney Opera House in September 1955. However, nationally the Labor party was divided on sectarian and ideological grounds. In Victoria, many members of the predominantly Catholic right-wing of the party had left the party and joined the nascent Democratic Labor Party (DLP). Cahill was desperate to keep the New South Wales branch of the ALP united. He achieved this by controlling the anti-DLP faction led by his ex-minister Clive Evatt (brother of H V Evatt) while at the same time keeping the right-wing faction within the party. Cahill's attempts at unity were assisted by the state's Catholic hierarchy who were less politically involved than their Victorian counterparts under Daniel Mannix. As a result, the effects of this split were not as severe in New South Wales and the DLP did not contest the 1956 state election. However, the split did have a significant effect on the Labor Party's vote and contributed to the loss of the seat of Waratah.

Labor's election promises included making the supply of state housing a top priority, reviving the State Bank which had been under the control of the federal government since 1932 and revitalizing the state's railways including the long delayed Eastern Suburbs line.

The coalition of the Liberal Party and Country Party coalition continued to suffer from leadership issues. Murray Robson had replaced Vernon Treatt as the Liberal Party leader and Leader of the Opposition in August 1954, but had proved inept for the position and was replaced by Pat Morton as leader in September 1955. Morton was a somewhat aloof figure, with a public presence more typical of pre-war conservative politicians, and found it difficult to connect with the public. Michael Bruxner continued as the leader of the Country Party.

The opposition campaigned on the government's broken promises and uncompleted public works as well as resentment against compulsory unionism and the implementation of the Cumberland Plan, which reserved a large area of the Sydney Basin from development. The coalition promised that the state transport system would be run along the lines of private enterprise and cease to be a drain on the state's budget. Bruxner called Cahill's plans a death bed repentance with no incentives for rural development.

== Results ==
The result of the election was a clear victory for Labor despite a net loss of 7 seats. The results gave Labor a parliamentary buffer of 3 seats plus the usual support of Tom Armstrong.

Labor losses were largely confined to the marginal or usually conservative seats that it had unexpectedly won at the 1953 election including Armidale, Coogee, Drummoyne, Georges River, Parramatta, and Sutherland. Labor regained the seat of Hartley from Independent Labor member Jim Chalmers who unsuccessfully contested Nepean as an independent. The loss of the usually safe seat of Waratah was a shock for Labor and was caused by a number of factors. The popular Labor incumbent Robert Cameron had retired and after a bitter pre-selection battle, Labor endorsed a Tighes Hill butcher, Harry Sheedy. Sheedy was a member of the socialist wing of the party and, at a time when the party was split on sectarian and ideological grounds, was disliked by many among the large and usually Labor voting Catholic population in the electorate. His main opponent and the winner of the seat was the independent, Frank Purdue who was prominent in local Government and the popular Lord Mayor of Newcastle.

New South Wales state election, 3 March 1956 Legislative Assembly << 1953–1959 >>
Enrolled voters	2,011,258 (Note: There were 1,846,859 enrolled voters in 86 contested electorates and 164,399 were enrolled in 8 uncontested electorates (2 Labor, 3 Liberal and 3 Country ).)				
Votes cast	1,722,628		Turnout	93.27	−0.59
Informal votes	28,805		Informal	1.67	−0.81
Summary of votes by party
Party	Primary votes	%	Swing	Seats	Change
Labor	800,410	47.25	−8.05	50	−7
Liberal	611,342	36.09	+8.15	27	+5
Country	172,020	10.16	−1.44	15	+1
Independent	53,019	3.13	+0.62	1	+1
Communist	29,534	1.74	+0.36	0	−
Independent Labor	14,950	1.88	−0.19	1	−
Lang Labor	11,028	0.65	+0.17	0	−
All others	1,502	0.09	+0.09	0	−
Total	1,693,823			94	

== Retiring members ==
=== Labor ===
- Robert Cameron (Waratah)
- Daniel Clyne (King)
- Edgar Dring (Auburn) died in December 1955; no by-election was held due to the proximity of the election.
- Arthur Williams (East Hills)

=== Liberal ===
- Walter Howarth (Maitland)
- Joseph Jackson (Nepean)

== Seats changing party representation ==
Seat	1953		1956	
Seat	Party	Member	Member	Party
Armidale	Labor	Jim Cahill	Davis Hughes	Country
Coogee	Labor	Lou Walsh	Kevin Ellis	Liberal
Drummoyne	Labor	Roy Jackson	Walter Lawrence	Liberal
Georges River	Labor	Frank O'Neill	Douglas Cross	Liberal
Hartley	Independent Labor	Jim Chalmers	Jim Robson	Labor
Kahibah (Note: Joshua Arthur (Labor) resigned as a result of the report of the Royal Commission concerning his relationship with Reginald Doyle. Tom Armstrong (Independent Labor) won the resulting by-election.)	Labor		Tom Armstrong	Independent Labor
Parramatta	Labor	Kevin Morgan	James Clough	Liberal
Sutherland	Labor	Tom Dalton	Ian Griffith	Liberal
Waratah	Labor	Robert Cameron	Frank Purdue	Independent

== Aftermath ==
Joe Cahill's triumph at this election ensured that he remained premier during the course of the parliament. Pat Morton remained Leader of the Opposition but Michael Bruxner finally retired as Leader of the New South Wales Country Party, a position he had held since 1932 and was replaced by Davis Hughes in 1958. During the parliament there were 6 by-elections. This led to changes in party representation in Kahibah where Tom Armstrong (Independent Labor) died and the endorsed Labor candidate Jack Stewart won the resulting by-election and in Wagga Wagga where Eddie Graham (Labor) died and the Liberal's Wal Fife won the resulting by-election. These results reduced the government's effective majority by 1.

== See also ==
- Candidates of the 1956 New South Wales state election
- Members of the New South Wales Legislative Assembly, 1956–1959
