= Members of the New South Wales Legislative Assembly =

Following are lists of members of the New South Wales Legislative Assembly:

- 1856–1858
- 1858–1859
- 1859–1860
- 1860–1864
- 1864–1869
- 1869–1872
- 1872–1874
- 1874–1877
- 1877–1880
- 1880–1882
- 1882–1885
- 1885–1887
- 1887–1889
- 1889–1891
- 1891–1894
- 1894–1895
- 1895–1898
- 1898–1901
- 1901–1904
- 1904–1907
- 1907–1910
- 1910–1913
- 1913–1917
- 1917–1920
- 1920–1922
- 1922–1925
- 1925–1927
- 1927–1930
- 1930–1932
- 1932–1935
- 1935–1938
- 1938–1941
- 1941–1944
- 1944–1947
- 1947–1950
- 1950–1953
- 1953–1956
- 1956–1959
- 1959–1962
- 1962–1965
- 1965–1968
- 1968–1971
- 1971–1973
- 1973–1976
- 1976–1978
- 1978–1981
- 1981–1984
- 1984–1988
- 1988–1981
- 1991–1995
- 1995–1999
- 1999–2003
- 2003–2007
- 2007–2011
- 2011–2015
- 2015–2019
- 2019–2023
- 2023–2027
