= Reg Hailstone =

Reginald John Hailstone
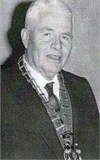
- Reginald John Hailstone, OBE
- Born: 1 November 1901; Woodstock, New South Wales, Australia
- Died: 19 February 1963 (aged 61); Manly, New South Wales, Australia
- Known for: Grazier, civic leader
- Board member of: President of Pastures Protection Board

Reginald John Hailstone (1901–1963) was an Australian grazier and civic leader in the Lachlan Valley area of New South Wales.

== Background ==
Reginald John Hailstone was born at Woodstock on 1 November 1901, eldest son of Isaac Hailstone and his wife, Julia Finn. He was educated at home by his mother under a big peppercorn tree, which still stands at Green Gully, Mount McDonald. Hailstone's parents were pioneers in the area, settling in the Woodstock district in the 1890s.

== Civic positions and achievements ==
Reg Hailstone was president of the Pastures Protection Board; a councilor and president of the Waugoola Shire Council; Chairman of the Wyangala National Park Trust; and actively involved in the Lachlan Valley Development League, as the representative of the Waugoola Shire Council. He was also a member of the Central Tablelands County and the Blayney Land Board.

Hailstone was very enthusiastic about the development of the Lachlan Valley, contending that the area had "unlimited possibilities, as a producer of food stuffs". He also saw great potential in elevating Wyangala 'National Park' (now Wyangala Waters State Park) to be an important tourist destination for the region. Hailstone was instrumental in getting the government to form the Wyangala National Park Trust, which focused on the development and beautification of the area. Amongst his many civic achievements, Hailstone facilitated progress and development in the Lachlan Valley, bringing together opposing sides of politics for the benefit of the region.

== Politics ==
Reg Hailstone was the nominated Country Party candidate for the 1953 New South Wales state election, electorate of Young. He was trying to unseat incumbent Labor Party member, Fred Cahill. Hailstone was the underdog in the election, being relatively unknown in the area at the time.

Hailstone was defeated by Cahill by 2,716 votes, with Cahill receiving 10,802 votes versus 8,086 votes for Hailstone. This was his only foray into State politics.

== Death ==
Reg Hailstone collapsed and died after going swimming at Manly in 1963.

The road between Wyangala and Woodstock was named "Reg Hailstone Way" in his honour.
