= 1953 Kahibah state by-election =

Election result for Kahibah, New South Wales, Australia

A by-election was held for the New South Wales Legislative Assembly seat of Kahibah on 31 October 1953. It was triggered by the forced resignation of Labor MLA Joshua Arthur, after a Royal Commission found his dealings with Reginald Doyle were improper. and was won by independent candidate Tom Armstrong.

== Background ==
Joshua Arthur had been the Labor member for Kahibah and its predecessor seat of Hamilton since 1935. He had been a minister in the McGirr government, serving as Minister for Tourist Activities and Immigration from 1949 to 1950, before being promoted to Secretary for Mines and Minister for Immigration.

On 9 February 1953, William Wentworth, a NSW member of federal parliament, aired allegations concerning Arthur's associations with Reginald Doyle, a Newcastle-based conman who was wanted on fraud charges. Arthur voluntarily stood down as a minister while declaring he would fight to clear his name, and the state government set up a Royal Commission into the allegations, to be conducted by Judge George Amsberg of the District Court. Amsberg's report, handed down in August after several months of hearings, found that Arthur had acted improperly but not corruptly in his dealings with Doyle.

In the immediate wake of the Royal Commission's findings, Arthur announced on 20 August that he would resign as member for Kahibah, but would contest the resulting by-election. The matter of his continued membership of the Labor was initially undecided, but when it became clear that the state executive would not support him, Arthur announced that he would resign from the party and not contest the by-election. This was insufficient for the executive, who rejected his resignation and formally expelled him from the party on 22 August.

== Candidates ==
Five candidates nominated for the by-election.

The Labor candidate for the by-election was Joshua Arthur Sr., the 71-year-old father of the outgoing member. His nomination and eventual victory in the preselection ballot was widely considered a surprise. There was reported concern within the Labor Party about his electability in the wake of the Doyle scandal, but a rumored move to overturn the result did not eventuate. The campaign was heavily tied to the former member; not only was his father the Labor candidate, but his wife served as campaign manager.

Tom Armstrong, a Newcastle councillor, former mayor, and prominent union official, contested the seat as an independent Labor candidate. Inglis Alexander, the Liberal candidate from the 1952 election, also contested the election as independent Labor after losing Liberal preselection.

The endorsed Liberal candidate was Harry Quinlan, while the endorsed Communist candidate was Douglas Olive.

== Result ==
1953 Kahibah by-election Saturday 31 October
Party	Candidate	Votes	%	±%
Independent	Tom Armstrong	5,706	34.67	+34.67
Liberal	Harry Quinlan	5,144	31.26	−4.07
Labor	Joshua Arthur, Sr.	4,059	24.67	−40.00
Independent	Inglis Alexander	1,101	6.69	+6.69
Communist	Douglas Olive	446	2.71	+2.71
Total formal votes		16,456		
Informal votes		428	2.53	
Turnout		16,884	88.82	
Two-candidate-preferred result
Independent	Tom Armstrong	10,647	64.70	+64.70
Liberal	Harry Quinlan	5,809	35.30	−0.03
Independent gain from Labor		Swing	N/A	

The by-election was a disastrous defeat for Labor in one of their safest seats. Arthur suffered a 40% swing against, finishing third behind independent candidate Armstrong and Liberal candidate Quinlan, with Armstrong being elected on Arthur's preferences.

== Aftermath ==
Armstrong had never been a member of the Labor Party, but generally supported the Labor government throughout his term. He was re-elected at the 1956 election, but died suddenly in March 1957. The seat reverted to Labor control upon his death, being won by endorsed candidate Jack Stewart.

== See also ==
- Electoral results for the district of Kahibah
- List of New South Wales state by-elections
