= 1957 Kahibah state by-election =

Election result for Kahibah, New South Wales, Australia

A by-election was held for the New South Wales Legislative Assembly electorate of Kahibah on 13 April 1957 because of the death of Tom Armstrong (Independent Labor).

== Dates ==
Date	Event
16 March 1956	Tom Armstrong died.
25 March 1957	Writ of election issued by the Speaker of the Legislative Assembly.
28 March 1957	Nominations
13 April 1957	Polling day
15 May 1957	Return of writ

== Result ==
1957 Kahibah by-election Saturday 13 April
Party	Candidate	Votes	%	±%
Labor	Jack Stewart	9,232	51.9	
Liberal	Joseph Richley	4,407	24.8	
Democratic Labor	John Daley	2,687	15.1	
Independent	Ethelene James	1,451	8.2	
Total formal votes		17,777	98.3	
Informal votes		303	1.7	
Turnout		18,080	91.2	
Labor hold		Swing	N/A	

== See also ==
- Electoral results for the district of Kahibah
- List of New South Wales state by-elections
