= Royal Commission into Joshua Arthur =

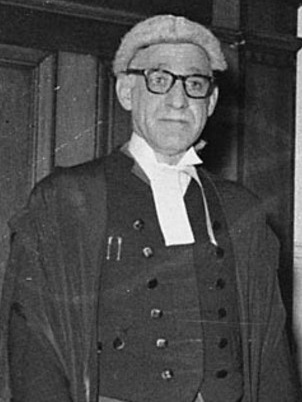
- Judge George Amsberg QC
- Date: February–August 1953
- Duration: 7 months
- Location: Sydney, Australia
- Commissioner: Judge George Amsberg QC
- Counsel Assisting: Harold Snelling QC
- Counsel for Arthur: Eric Miller QC

The Royal Commission into Joshua Arthur (February–August 1953) or Doyle Royal Commission, formally called the "Royal Commission of Inquiry into matters relating to Joshua George Arthur and Reginald Aubrey Doyle" was a royal commission in New South Wales initiated by the Cahill government to investigate allegations against Joshua Arthur, the Secretary for Mines and Minister for Immigration.

== Background and Terms of Reference ==
On 9 February 1953, Bill Wentworth, a NSW member of federal parliament, aired allegations concerning Arthur's associations with Reginald Aubrey Doyle, a conman who was wanted on fraud charges concerning forged shares in Placer Development Ltd. Doyle had a lengthy criminal history, having been sentenced to 9 terms of imprisonment between 1931 and 1940, for a total of 36 years, however many of the terms were concurrent and he was released in 1942. In April 1951 Doyle was convicted of three customs offences, claiming that a 1949 Buick was a gift to him. While Doyle was fined £510, the car was seized from the subsequent purchaser, before being returned in February 1953. Another Buick, with the NSW registration number AHB 405 was alleged to have been parked by Doyle or his wife at Parliament House, where Doyle was said to have used Arthur's room to operate his motor vehicle import business. While Doyle possessed the vehicle, the High Court later held that it was not owned by him.

Arthur voluntarily stood down as a minister while declaring he would fight to clear his name, and the state government set up a royal commission into the allegations, to be conducted by Judge George Amsberg of the District Court.

The terms of reference for the commission were to investigate:

(1) Whether Joshua George Arthur acted corruptly or improperly in any association or dealing with Reginald Aubrey Doyle.

(2) Whether any member of either House of Parliament of New South Wales or any officer or person employed in or about the Parliamentary Establishment made available to Reginald Aubrey Doyle the use of any office or room in that establishment or the use of any telephone in that establishment or elsewhere.

(3)(a) Whether any Motor Car owned by Reginald Aubrey Doyle or by his wife was at any time or times parked in any parking area at Parliament House: if so, whether he or his wife was granted authority or leave to park such Motor Car in such parking area, and by whom and at whose request such authority or leave was granted.

(b) Whether the Motor Car bearing the registered Number AHB 405 was parked in such parking area on the second or third day of February,1953 and if so, by whom an in what circumstances was it moved.

(4)(a) Whether on or about the sixth day of February, 1953, a slip bearing what purported to be an authority or leave to park in the parking area at Parliament House Motor Cars bearing the registration numbers AHB.405 and AEZ.728 was included in or attached to the list supplied to and held by the member of the Police force in charge of that parking area.

(b) If so, then

(i) By whom and in what circumstance did such authority or leave purport to be granted and by whom was it issued.
(ii) Whether such slip was removed from such list, and if so, by whom, at whose directions, and in what circumstances.

(5)(a) Whether Joshua George Arthur or any other Minister of the Government of New South Wales or of the Commonwealth is now or has been at any time during his tenure of office as a Minister a shareholder in a company named Constructors (Engineering and Industrial) Limited; and if so, whether all or any such shares are or were held by him beneficially; what is or has been the extent of such interest; and what profits or benefits (if any) have accrued to him by reason of such interest.

(b) Whether the company named Constructors (Engineering and Industrial) Limited or any company in which that company hold any interest has entered into any contract or contracts with the Joint Coal Board or any subsidiary of the Joint Coal Board: and if so -

(i) what was the nature of such contract or contracts: in what circumstances was it or were they entered into, and to what extent (if any) has the company or any such company as aforesaid benefited under such contract or contracts.
(ii) Whether Joshua George Arthur or any other Minister of the Government of New South Wales or of the Commonwealth has acted corruptly or improperly in any way in reference to such contract or contracts.

The allegations were made less than a week before the 1953 New South Wales state election. Arthur was the member for Kahibah, in the Newcastle region, which was a safe Labor seat. with a margin of 19.3%. He retained the seat at the election on 14 February, with a reduced margin of 14.7%. Doyle was bankrupted with debts of more than £100,000, imprisoned for contempt of court for failing to reveal the whereabouts of $9,000, and then pleaded guilty to 15 charges of fraud, forgery, utering and stealing in relation to the Placer Development shares, for which he was sentenced to 10 years in prison.

== Commission term, proceedings, recommendations and report ==
Hearings commenced on 25 March 1953 and the Commissioner conducted public hearings on 35 days, with evidence given by 54 witnesses and 79 exhibits were tendered. Counsel assisting was Harold Snelling QC, Arthur was represented by Eric Miller QC while Wentworth was represented by Richard Ashburner QC. As well as determining the facts, the commission had to decide the legal standard that applied to determine if conduct was corrupt or improper. Miller sought to apply a narrow meaning, limited to a breach of the criminal law, while counsel assisting submitted that it had a wider meaning. The Commission did not decide this issue as he concluded that on either approach Arthur's conduct was not corrupt. The Commission accepted that "improper" meant:

Conduct which is discreditable, dishonourable, disreputable or seriously reprehensible on the part of a person occupying the position of a Minister of the Crown; or conduct which is a serious or substantial breach of recognised standards of rectitude and decency to be expected of a person fulfilling the office of a Cabinet Minister, and such as would meet with general condemnation by right-minded citizens.

Reference 1

The report concluded in relation to the principal allegation that:

(a) In view of what has been said earlier, I find that Joshua George Arthur did not act corruptly in any dealing or association with Reginald Aubrey Doyle.

(b) I find that Joshua George Arthur acted improperly in the following associations and dealings with Reginald Aubrey Doyle:

(i) Mr. Arthur in his dealings with Mr. Doyle, after knowledge Mr. Doyle's misappropriation of the £1,400 referred to in paragraph (4)(d) above, acted improperly within the meaning of the definition I have accepted as the correct one. Mr. Arthur had, as I have stated above, the knowledge I have referred to as a "background circumstance" ... and the knowledge of Mr. Doyle's conduct ... Mr. Arthur must have realised, by early 1952, also, that Mr. Doyle was not of the financial standing that Mr. Doyle had led Mr. Arthur to believe that he was. Mr. Arthur knew, very early in 1952, that Mr. Doyle had bought a vehicle from Construction Services Ltd., through the Australian Guarantee Corporation on hire purchase, and that he was quite unable to pay his gambling debts. By reason of these matters, the veneer of wealth and respectability assumed by Mr. Doyle must have worn thin, almost, if not entirely, to vanishing point, and Mr. Arthur must have realised this and, it must have been driven home to Mr. Arthur's mind that Mr. Doyle was a completely worthless individual, void of rectitude and undeserving of any kind of trust or confidence which might be reposed in him. Mr. Arthur's subsequent acts of commission and of omission in this regard ... I find, pass the bounds of mere indiscretion, un-wisdom or foolishness, and were discreditable or seriously reprehensible in a person occupying the position of a Minister of the Crown, and constituted a substantial breach of the recognised standards of right dealing to be expected of a Minister of the Crown.
(ii) The dealings and transactions ... are, I find, such as brings Mr. Arthur's conduct in relation thereto also precisely within the definition of "improper conduct". It amounts to a grave departure from recognised standards of rectitude to be expected of a Minister of the Crown, and is such as would meet with condemnation by right-minded citizens and was dishonourable.
(iii) The association and dealing by Mr. Arthur with Mr. Doyle in relation to Mr. Crowe are, too, on the facts as I have found them, "Improper". Indeed, Mr. Miller conceded that if Mr. Arthur had known that Mr. Doyle had had criminal convictions, it would be improper on his part to have given Mr. Doyle, in effect, a reference as to character, or to do anything which would have given a-cachet or standing of respectability and worth to Mr. Doyle. There is no real distinction, for this purpose, between knowledge that Mr. Doyle actually had convictions, and the sure and certain knowledge of him which Mr. Arthur at that time possessed. Mr. Arthur's conduct, in this aspect, also, must be regarded as a serious departure from recognised standards of right-dealing to be expected of a Cabinet Minister, and is such as would undoubtedly meet with general condemnation by right-minded citizens, and was not honourable.

(c) I therefore answer the question propounded in term 1 of Your Excellency's reference as follows:- Not corruptly, but improperly in relation to the matters set out above.

Reference 2

The report concluded that apart from limited instances in which John Seiffert had made his rooms available to Doyle, no other employee or Member of Parliament except Arthur had made rooms or telephones available to him. The Commissioner concluded that Seffiert had probably allowed Doyle to use his rooms merely as a courtesy, as he assumed that Doyle was in Parliament House on legitimate business.

Reference 3

The commission found that cars belonging to and Mrs Doyle were parked in the Parliament House car park on a number of occasions, but no specific authorisation was given and Mrs Doyle simply took advantage of the custom to waive the strict rule regarding parking in the Parliament House car park for those who had dealings with Ministers. Doyle had given the impression to the Police in charge of parking that both he and his wife were in Parliament on legitimate business.

Reference 4

The commission found that the car bearing the registration number AHB 405 was moved by Mrs Doyle at 11:30 on 2 February 1953 at the request of Mr Doyle. He also concluded that the Parliament House parking authorisation list had been altered to allow cars with registration number AHB 405, AEZ 728 to park in the parking area, and then subsequently removed. There was not enough evidence however, to determine who granted the authority. There was also not enough evidence to determine "by whom or at whose direction such slip was removed, nor the circumstances in which was removed".

Reference 5

The report concluded that Arthur had beneficially held shares up until approximately November 1953, in Constructors (Engineering and Industrial) Limited whilst he was Minister for Mines, except for 12,000 shares which he transferred to his former wife and two children as part of a divorce settlement and had made a profit of over £2,000 on the shares. The Commission also found evidence of a small holding in the company by Mr Renshaw, the Minister for Lands, but concluded that "No other Minister of the Government of New South Wales or of the Commonwealth is now or has been at any time during his tenure of office as a Minister a shareholder in Constructors (Engineering and Industrial) Limited." The Commission concluded that Constructors (Engineering and Industrial) Ltd. and its subsidiaries had entered into several contracts with the Joint Coal Board (and its subsidiary companies). All of these contracts were considered to be perfectly legitimate by the Commission. The Commission concluded that Mr Arthur had not acted corruptly, or improperly either in his shareholding with Constructor (Engineering and Industrial) Limited, or in reference to the contracts that the company had with the Joint Coal Board, as he probably had acquired shares in the company without any knowledge of a potential contractual arrangement between the Joint Coal Board and the company, or before any business relations had been conducted between the two companies.

== Aftermath ==
After the report was tabled in the Legislative Assembly, Arthur spoke for 75 minutes in his defence, before tendering his resignation as the member for Kahibah, stating his intention to contest the resulting by-election. The matter of his continued membership of the Labor was initially undecided, but when it became clear that the state executive would not support him, Arthur announced that he would resign from the party and not contest the by-election. This was insufficient for the executive, who rejected his resignation and formally expelled him from the party on 22 August. The surprise Labor candidate for the by-election was Joshua Arthur Sr., the 71-year-old father of the outgoing member, which Antony Green described as a snub by local party branches to the Labor Party. Arthur Sr was soundly defeated, finishing third and the seat won by independent Tom Armstrong.

Doyle remained an undischarged bankrupt in 1964, when he was charged with fraud involving £160,000 of bogus invoices, and was sentenced to a further 12 years in prison.
