= Walter Lawrence (Australian politician) =

Australian politician

Walter Richard Lawrence MBE (3 January 1895 – 24 March 1966) was an Australian politician. He was the Liberal member for Drummoyne in the New South Wales Legislative Council from 1956 to 1962.

Lawrence was born at Lawsons Creek, near Mudgee in New South Wales, to farmer Charles Lawrence and Esther Barton. He grew up on his parents' farm, and in 1914 enlisted in the AIF, serving until 1918. In August 1918 he married Alethia James, with whom he had four children. Also in that year he was employed at Ellerslie station, between Adelong and Tarcutta, of which he was manager from 1919 to 1922. He later joined the police force, rising to become Superintendent of the traffic branch and Deputy Commissioner. He retired from the force in 1954. He was briefly a member of Drummoyne Council in 1966. Lawrence was also a Methodist lay preacher, and was president of the Royal Society for the Prevention of Cruelty to Animals.

At the 1956 election Lawrence was the Liberal candidate for Drummoyne and he defeated sitting Labor member Roy Jackson. He was re-elected in the 1959 election, but in 1962 a redistribution gave the seat a notional Labor majority and Lawrence was defeated by Leichhardt MP Reg Coady, whose seat had been abolished.

Lawrence died in Sydney in 1966.

New South Wales Legislative Assembly
| Preceded by Roy Jackson | Member for Drummoyne; 1956–1962 | Succeeded by Reg Coady |
