= Ian Griffith =

Australian politician (1925–1992)

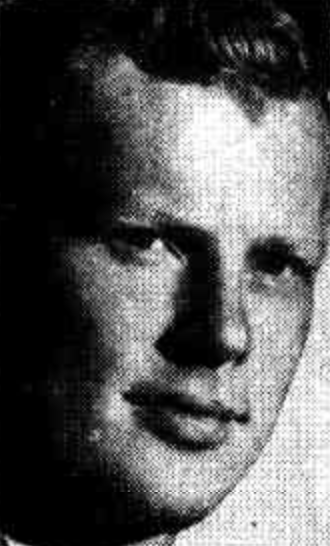

Chief Secretary of New South Wales
- In office 19 June 1972 – 3 January 1975
- Preceded by: Eric Willis
- Succeeded by: Peter Coleman

Personal details
- Born: 25 September 1925 Caulfield, Victoria
- Died: 8 November 1992 (aged 67) Gold Coast, Queensland
- Party: Liberal

Ian Ross Griffith (25 September 1925 – 8 November 1992) was an Australian politician and a member of the New South Wales Legislative Assembly from 1956 until 1978. He was a member of the Liberal Party and held ministerial positions in the governments of Sir Robert Askin and Eric Willis.

== Early life ==
Griffith was born in Caulfield, Victoria and was the son of a chemical analyst. He was educated at Melbourne High School and worked as a bank officer for the National Bank of Australasia eventually becoming a public relations officer in Sydney. During the Second World War, he served with the Royal Australian Navy and reached the rank of Lieutenant.

== Political career ==
Griffith entered the New South Wales parliament at the 1956 election as the Liberal member for Sutherland. He defeated the sitting Labor member, Tom Dalton, who won the seat in a surprise result at the previous election. The Liberal Party's hold on Sutherland was adversely affected by a redistribution at the 1959 election and Griffith successfully contested the new and safer seat of Cronulla.He retained the seat until he lost the Liberal Party's endorsement before the 1978 election and retired from public life.

Griffith was promoted to the position of Chief Secretary and Minister for Tourism, under Sir Robert Askin, between 1972 and 1975. He was demoted to the backbench when Askin retired and was succeeded as Premier by Tom Lewis but was appointed as the Minister for Housing in the short lived government of Eric Willis between January and May 1976.

New South Wales Legislative Assembly
Preceded by Tom Dalton	Member for Sutherland; 1956 – 1959	Succeeded by Tom Dalton
Preceded by New seat	Member for Cronulla; 1959 – 1978	Succeeded by Michael Egan
Political offices
Preceded by Eric Willis	Chief Secretary of New South Wales; 1972 – 1975	Succeeded by Peter Coleman
Preceded by Eric Willis	Minister for Tourism; 1972 – 1975	Succeeded by Peter Coleman
Preceded by Laurie McGinty	Minister for Housing; 1976	Succeeded by Jack Ferguson
Preceded by Laurie McGinty	Minister for Co-operative Societies; 1976	Succeeded by Syd Einfeld
