= Robert McCartney (Australian politician) =

Australian politician

Member of the New South Wales Legislative Assembly for Hamilton
- In office 21 March 1959 – 13 January 1971
- Preceded by: George Glover Campbell
- Succeeded by: District abolished

Personal details
- Born: Robert Arthur McCartney; 7 September 1906 Newcastle upon Tyne, England
- Died: 19 July 1978 (aged 71) Unknown
- Party: Labor Party
- Spouse: Emma Bird
- Children: One daughter
- Occupation: Politician/ Bus Driver

Robert Arthur McCartney (7 September 1906 – 19 July 1978) was an Australian politician who represented the Electoral district of Hamilton for the Labor Party from 1959 until 1971.

== Early life ==
McCartney was born to parents Robert McCartney snr. and Elizabeth Hunter. McCartney immigrated to Australia in 1921 to New South Wales with his family. His father was killed in the Battle of the Somme in World War I.

McCartney served in the Royal Australian Air Force from 1941 to 1946. He was on active reserve until 1956. On 12 April 1930, he married Emma Bird, with whom he had one daughter.

== Political career ==
McCartney joined the Tempe branch of the Labor Party in 1930. He founded the Jesmond branch in 1938, becoming senior vice president. He was delegate to state conference and council, secretary of Hunter federal electorate council. He won Labor preselection defeating the incumbent member George Campbell for the safe Labor seat of Hamilton to contest the 1959 New South Wales State election. He won and subsequently won the succeeding 1962, 1965, and 1968 elections. He did not contest the 1971 election where Hamilton was abolished and replaced by Charlestown.

== Other ==
McCartney died on 19 July 1978 (aged 71). He was a member of various community organisations.

New South Wales Legislative Assembly
Preceded by George Campbell	Member for Hamilton; 1935–1950	District abolished
