= Frank O'Neill (politician) =

Australian politician

Personal details
- Born: 16 October 1893 Newcastle, New South Wales
- Died: 1 November 1975 (aged 82) Sutherland, New South Wales
- Party: Labor Party

Frank O'Neill (1893–1975) was an Australian politician and a member of the New South Wales Legislative Assembly for a single term between 1953 and 1956. He was a member of the Labor Party (ALP).

O'Neill was born in Newcastle, New South Wales and was the son of a postmaster. He was educated at Sydney Boys High School. and worked as a clerk in the New South Wales Public Service. O'Neill joined the Labor Party at an early age and, as a member of the Socialization Units, was an opponent of the leadership of Jack Lang in the 1930s. He was the president of Robert Heffron's breakaway Industrial Labor Party in 1938-39 and became a member of the Labor Party's executive when the Industrial Party rejoined the official party in 1939. O'Neill was elected to parliament as the Labor member for Georges River at the 1953 state election. The incumbent Labor member Arthur Williams left Georges River, which was traditionally a Liberal seat, to contest the safer seat of East Hills. The 1953 election saw Labor make significant gains in marginal seats. At the next election, in 1956, Labor's vote dropped because of divisions within the federal Labor Party and the formation of the DLP. As a result, O'Neill lost the seat to the Liberal party's Douglas Cross, and retired from public life. He did not hold party, parliamentary or ministerial office.

New South Wales Legislative Assembly
Preceded by Arthur Williams	Member for Georges River; 1953 – 1956	Succeeded by Douglas Cross
