= Tom Dalton =

Australian politician

Member of the New South Wales Legislative Assembly for Sutherland
- In office 14 February 1953 – 6 February 1956
- Preceded by: Cecil Monro
- Succeeded by: Ian Griffith
- In office 21 March 1959 – 23 January 1968
- Preceded by: Ian Griffith
- Succeeded by: Tim Walker

Personal details
- Born: Thomas William Dalton; 1 January 1904 Wee Waa, New South Wales, Australia
- Died: 16 August 1981 (aged 77) Miranda, New South Wales, Australia
- Party: Labor Party

Thomas William Dalton (1 January 1904 – 16 August 1981) was an Australian politician and a member of the New South Wales Legislative Assembly from 1953 until 1956 and from 1959 until 1968. He was a member of the Labor Party (ALP).

== Early life ==
Dalton was born in Wee Waa, New South Wales and was the son of a teamster. Chris Dalton a member of the New South Wales Legislative Council between 1943 and 1970 was his brother. He was educated to elementary level in country schools and after working in numerous rural jobs he joined the construction division of the New South Wales Government Railways in 1922. He was an official of the Australian Workers' Union between 1935 and 1945.

== State Parliament ==
Dalton was elected to parliament as the Labor member for Sutherland at the 1953 state election in which he defeated the incumbent Liberal member Cecil Monro. At the 1956 election Labor's vote dropped because of divisions within the federal Labor Party and the formation of the DLP. This resulted in Dalton losing the seat to the Liberal party's Ian Griffith. Dalton re-contested the seat in 1959 and he defeated the Liberal candidate Keith Bates ( Griffith had successfully transferred to the seat of Cronulla ). Dalton remained in parliament until he was defeated at the 1968 election by the Liberal candidate, Tim Walker. Dalton then retired from public life and became a taxi-truck operator. He did not hold party, parliamentary or ministerial office.

New South Wales Legislative Assembly
| Preceded by Cecil Monro | Member for Sutherland; 1953–1956 | Succeeded by Ian Griffith |
| Preceded by Ian Griffith | Member for Sutherland; 1959–1968 | Succeeded by Tim Walker |
