= Jack Stewart (New South Wales politician) =

Australian politician

Jack Stewart MLA

Member of the New South Wales Legislative Assembly for Charlestown
- In office 13 February 1971 – 19 September 1972
- Preceded by: New district
- Succeeded by: Richard Face

Member of the New South Wales Legislative Assembly for Kahibah
- In office 13 April 1957 – 13 January 1971
- Preceded by: Tom Armstrong
- Succeeded by: District abolished

Personal details
- Born: 6 January 1910 Lithgow, New South Wales Australia
- Died: 19 September 1972 (aged 62) Adamstown, New South Wales Australia
- Party: Labor Party
- Spouse: Eileen Dorothy Chillinsworth
- Children: One son
- Profession: Politician/ Boilermaker

John Julius Thomas Stewart (6 January 1910 – 19 September 1972) was an Australian politician. He was a Labor Party member of the New South Wales Legislative Assembly from 1957 to 1972, representing the electorates of Kahibah (1957–71) and Charlestown (1971–72).

== Early life ==
Stewart was born to parents Charles Thomas Stewart, a Caulker, and Mary Jane Sheen. Stewart jnr was educated at Wickham and Cooks Hill Boys' High School. He apprenticed to boilermaking at Walsh Island Government dockyard in Newcastle.

After a long period of unemployment in the 1930s Great Depression, Stewart married Eileen Dorothy Chillinsworth on 4 December 1950 to whom they had one son. He was a Freemason.

== Politics ==
Stewart joined the Labor Party in 1926. He was a member of the Hamilton, Adamstown and Dudley-Redhead branches. He was President of Kahabah state electoral council.

Stewart won Labor pre-selection for the Electoral district of Kahibah and contested and won the seat at the 1957 by-election, following the death of Independent member Tom Armstrong. He won re-election at the 1959, 1962, 1965, and 1968 elections. With abolition of the seat of Kahibah at the 1971 election, Stewart switched seats to the nearby seat of Charlestown. He won the seat but died shortly after the election.

== Death ==
Shortly after winning the seat of Charlestown, Stewart died at his home on 19 September 1972 (aged 62). His funeral was held at Beresfield crematorium by Adamstown Methodist Church ministers.

New South Wales Legislative Assembly
Preceded by Tom Armstrong	Member for Kahibah; 1957–1971	District abolished
New district	Member for Charlestown; 1971–1972	Succeeded by Richard Face
