= Roy Jackson (politician) =

Australian politician

Personal details
- Born: 2 September 1895 Balmain, New South Wales
- Died: 12 February 1964 (aged 68) Lewisham, New South Wales
- Party: Labor Party

Roy Stanley Jackson (1895–1964) was an Australian politician and a member of the New South Wales Legislative Assembly for a single term between 1953 and 1956. He was a member of the Labor Party (ALP).

Jackson was born in Balmain, New South Wales and was the son of a trade union organizer. He was educated to elementary level in state schools and initially worked as a shipwright. During World War One he served with the First Australian Imperial Force in the Middle East and France. He joined the Federated Shipwrights and Ship Constructors' Association of Australia and became a full-time official with the union after 1934. He was also a member of the executive committee of the Australian Council of Trade Unions. Jackson was elected to parliament as the Labor member for Drummoyne at the 1953 election. He defeated the incumbent Liberal member Robert Dewley in an election in which Labor made significant gains in marginal seats. At the 1956 election Labor's vote dropped because of divisions within the federal Labor Party and the formation of the DLP. As a result, Jackson lost the seat to the Liberal party's Walter Lawrence. He unsuccessfully re-contested the seat at the 1959 election and retired from public life after his defeat. He did not hold party, parliamentary or ministerial office.

New South Wales Legislative Assembly
| Preceded by Robert Dewley | Member for Drummoyne; 1953–1956 | Succeeded by Walter Lawrence |
