= George Glover Campbell =

Australian politician (1887–1967)

George Campbell

Member of the New South Wales Legislative Assembly for Hamilton
- In office 17 June 1950 – 16 February 1959
- Preceded by: Joshua Arthur
- Succeeded by: Robert McCartney

Personal details
- Born: George Glover Campbell; 2 March 1887 Barrow-in-Furness, Lancashire, England
- Died: 3 September 1967 (aged 80) Newcastle, New South Wales, Australia
- Party: Labor Party
- Spouse: Carrie Mayhew
- Children: Raymond Glover Campbell, Joan Caroline Campbell
- Occupation: Politician/ Carpenter and joiner

George Glover Campbell (2 March 1887 – 3 September 1967) was an Australian politician who represented the Electoral district of Hamilton from 1950 till 1959 for the Labor Party.

== Early life ==
Born in England to parents Isaac Campbell, a grocer, and Susannah Patterson, Campbell Jr arrived in Australia in 1905. He lived at Drummoyne and worked in Sydney harbour shipyards. He moved to Newcastle in 1907, and was employed in State Dockyard at Walsh Island. He remained at the dockyards until being employed in parliament.

== Political career ==
Campbell was President of Merewether branch and of Hamilton state electorate council for some years. He was an Alderman on Merewether council. He contested the hard Labor seat of Electoral district of Hamilton at the 1950 state election and won. Campbell subsequently won re-election at the 1953, and 1956 state elections but lost pre-selection to Robert McCartney at the 1959 State election., Campbell resigned from the Labor Party in 1959 in protest and never rejoined.

== Death ==
Campbell died on 3 September 1967 (aged 80). He is buried at Beresfield Cemetery.

New South Wales Legislative Assembly
Preceded by Joshua Arthur	Member for Hamilton; 1950–1959	Succeeded by Robert McCartney
