= Joshua Arthur =

Australian politician

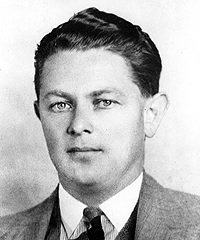

NSW Secretary for Mines
- In office 30 June 1950 – 23 February 1953
- Premier: Jim McGirr; Joseph Cahill
- Preceded by: William Dickson
- Succeeded by: Bob Heffron

NSW Minister for Immigration
- In office 30 June 1950 – 23 February 1953
- Premier: Jim McGirr; Joseph Cahill
- Preceded by: Himself (as Minister in Charge of Tourist Activities and Immigration)
- Succeeded by: Gus Kelly

Minister in Charge of Tourist Activities and Immigration
- In office 21 September 1949 – 30 June 1950
- Premier: Jim McGirr
- Preceded by: Claude Matthews
- Succeeded by: Himself (as Minister for Immigration)

Member of the New South Wales Legislative Assembly for Kahibah
- In office 17 June 1950 – 19 August 1953
- Preceded by: New district
- Succeeded by: Tom Armstrong

Member of the New South Wales Legislative Assembly for Hamilton
- In office 11 May 1935 – 22 May 1950
- Preceded by: William Brennan
- Succeeded by: George Campbell

Personal details
- Born: 27 January 1906 Adamstown, New South Wales, Australia
- Died: 20 May 1974 (aged 68) Sydney, Australia
- Party: Labor

Military service
- Allegiance: Australia
- Branch/service: Australian Army
- Years of service: 1940–1945
- Rank: Captain
- Unit: Second Australian Imperial Force

Joshua George Arthur (27 January 1906 – 20 May 1974) was an Australian schoolteacher and politician who represented the Hamilton and Kahibah districts for the Labor Party.

== Early life ==
Born to Joshua Arthur, a blacksmith, and Ethel May Embleton in Adamstown, New South Wales. He was educated at Adamstown Public School, Newcastle High School and Sydney Teachers College, graduating in 1924. He taught for the New South Wales Department of Education from 1925 until 1935, in the Wellington, Sydney and Newcastle districts.

He served in the second Australian Imperial Forces. Enlisted in 1940, served in North Africa and on the staff of the Minister for the Army, Frank Forde, from 1943 until 1945.

== Political career ==
Arthur was the member for Hamilton, winning the seat at the 1935, 1938, 1941, 1944 and 1947 State elections. Arthur transferred to the new seat of Kahibah at the 1950 State election. He was Minister for Tourist Activities and Immigration in the Second McGirr ministry from 21 September 1949 until 30 June 1950 and Secretary for Mines and Minister for Immigration from 30 June 1950 until 23 February 1953 in the Third McGirr ministry and First Cahill ministry.

On 9 February 1953, Bill Wentworth, a NSW member of federal parliament, aired allegations concerning Arthur's associations with Reginald Doyle, a Newcastle-based conman who was wanted on fraud charges. Arthur voluntarily stood down as a minister while declaring he would fight to clear his name, and the state government set up a Royal Commission into the allegations, to be conducted by Judge George Amsberg of the District Court. Amsberg's report, handed down in August after several months of hearings, found that Arthur had acted improperly but not corruptly in his dealings with Doyle. The report concluded:

Mr Arthur knew very early in 1952, that Mr Doyle had bought a vehicle from Constructions services Ltd., through the Australian Guarantee Corporation on hire purchase, and that he was quite unable to pay his gambling debts. By reason of these matters, the veneer of wealth and respectability assumed by Mr Doyle must have worn thin almost if not entirely, to vanishing point, and Mr Arthur must have realised this, and it must have been driven home to Mr Arthur’s mind that Mr Doyle was a completely worthless individual, void of rectitude and undeserving of any kind of trust or confidence which might be reposed in him. Mr Arthur’s subsequent acts of commission and of omission in this regard ….. I find, pass the bounds of mere indiscretion, unwisdom or foolishness, and were discreditable or seriously reprehensible in a person occupying the position of a Minister of the Crown, and constituted a substantial breach of the recognised standards of right dealing to be expected of a Minister of the Crown.

In the immediate wake of the Royal Commission's findings, Arthur announced on 20 August that he would resign as member for Kahibah, but would contest the resulting by-election. The matter of his continued membership of the Labor was initially undecided, but when it became clear that the state executive would not support him, Arthur announced that he would resign from the party and not contest the by-election. This was insufficient for the executive, who rejected his resignation and formally expelled him from the party on 22 August.

== Death ==
Arthur died on 20 May 1974 (aged 68). He was buried at Northern Suburbs Crematorium following a service at St Stephen's Uniting Church, Macquarie Street.

New South Wales Legislative Assembly
Preceded by William Brennan	Member for Hamilton; 1935–1950	Succeeded by George Campbell
New district	Member for Kahibah; 1950–1953	Succeeded by Tom Armstrong
Political offices
Preceded by Claude Matthews	Minister in Charge of Tourist Activities and Immigration; 1949 – 1950	Succeeded by Himself as Minister for Immigration
Preceded by Claude Matthews	Minister in Charge of Tourist Activities and Immigration; 1949 – 1950	Tourist Activities abolished next held by Gus Kelly
Preceded by Himself	Minister for Immigration; 1950 – 1953	Succeeded by Gus Kelly
Preceded by William Dickson	Secretary for Mines; 1950 – 1953	Succeeded by Bob Heffron
