= Fred Cahill =

Australian politician

Personal details
- Born: 16 July 1898 Ballina, New South Wales
- Died: 5 November 1980 (aged 82) St Ives, New South Wales
- Party: Labor Party

Frederick Joseph Cahill (16 July 1898 – 5 November 1980) was an Australian politician. He was a member of the New South Wales Legislative Assembly from 1941 until 1959 . He was a member of the Labor Party (ALP).

Cahill was born in Ballina, New South Wales. He was the son of a timber feller and was educated at Parramatta Marist High School and St Joseph's, Lochinvar. He initially worked as a journalist and moved to Young in 1923 as a reporter for the Young Daily Witness. He was the director of publicity for Newcastle City Council between 1934 and 1940. In 1934 he helped establish the New South Wales Country Rugby League. During World War 1, Cahill served with the Australian Imperial Forces and was wounded in France. In the Second World War he served with the Royal Australian Air Force until 1941. At the 1941 state election, Cahill was elected as the Labor Party member for Young defeating the sitting Country Party member Albert Reid. He remained the member for Young until he retired at the 1959 election. He did not hold ministerial or party office. Cahill was awarded an MBE and the French National Order of Merit.

New South Wales Legislative Assembly
Preceded by Albert Reid	Member for Young; 1941–1959	Succeeded by George Freudenstein
