= Tom Armstrong (politician) =

Australian politician

Personal details
- Born: 13 September 1903 Lambton, New South Wales
- Died: 16 March 1957 (aged 53) Lambton, New South Wales
- Party: Independent Labor

Thomas Armstrong (13 September 1903 – 16 March 1957) was an Australian politician. He was a member of the New South Wales Parliament from 1953 until his death in 1957. He was independent but generally supported the Labor Party government of Joseph Cahill. Armstrong was born and educated to elementary level in Lambton, New South Wales. He was the son of a coal-miner and began working as a miner at Wallsend Colliery at age 14. He eventually became an ironworker at the Newcastle Steel Works and became an official of the Federated Ironworkers' Association. He was elected as an alderman of Newcastle City Council between 1941 and 1953 and was the Mayor of Newcastle in 1952.

== State Politics ==
Armstrong was elected as the member for Kahibah at a by-election, caused by the resignation of Joshua Arthur who was found guilty by a Royal Commission of improper business dealings. He was re-elected at the 1956 election, but died a year later.

New South Wales Legislative Assembly
| Preceded by Joshua Arthur | Member for Kahibah; 1953 – 1957 | Succeeded by Jack Stewart |
