= Electoral district of Kahibah =

Former state electoral district of New South Wales, Australia

Kahibah was an electoral district of the Legislative Assembly in the Australian state of New South Wales created in 1894 with the abolition of multi-member districts from part of the electoral district of Newcastle and named after the Newcastle suburb of Kahibah. It was abolished in 1920, with the introduction of proportional representation. It was recreated in 1927 and abolished and partly replaced by Waratah in 1930. It was recreated in 1950 and abolished again in 1971 and replaced by Charlestown.

== Members for Kahibah ==
First incarnation (1894–1920)
Member	Party	Term
Alfred Edden	Labour	1894–1917
Alfred Edden	Nationalist	1917–1920
Second incarnation (1927–1930)
Member	Party	Term
Hugh Connell	Labor	1927–1930
Third incarnation (1950–1971)
Member	Party	Term
Joshua Arthur	Labor	1950–1953
Tom Armstrong	Independent Labor	1953–1957
Jack Stewart	Labor	1957–1971

== Election results ==
1968 New South Wales state election: Kahibah
Party	Candidate	Votes	%	±%
Labor	Jack Stewart	12,949	58.5	−5.1
Liberal	Roy Hammond	7,166	32.4	−4.1
Democratic Labor	William Crane	1,055	4.8	+4.8
Communist	Darrell Dawson	691	3.1	+3.1
Independent	William Fricker	259	1.2	+1.2
Total formal votes		22,120	97.6	
Informal votes		540	2.4	
Turnout		22,660	95.2	
Two-party-preferred result
Labor	Jack Stewart	13,843	62.6	−1.0
Liberal	Roy Hammond	8,277	37.4	+1.0
Labor hold		Swing	−1.0	
