= Electoral results for the district of Oxley =

Election results for Oxley, New South Wales, Australia

Oxley, an electoral district of the Legislative Assembly in the Australian state of New South Wales, has had two incarnations, the first from 1920, returning 3 members until 1927 and was abolished in 1988. The second from 1991 until the present.

== Members ==
First incarnation (1920–1988)
Election	Member	Party	Member	Party	Member	Party
1920	George Briner	Progressive	Joseph Fitzgerald	Labor	Richard Price	Progressive
1920 apt	Theodore Hill	Progressive	Joseph Fitzgerald	Labor	Richard Price	Progressive
1922	Theodore Hill	Nationalist	Joseph Fitzgerald	Labor	Roy Vincent	Progressive
1925	Theodore Hill	Nationalist	Joseph Fitzgerald	Labor	Roy Vincent	Progressive
1927	Lewis Martin	Nationalist				
1930	Lewis Martin	Nationalist				
1932	Lewis Martin	United Australia				
1935	Lewis Martin	United Australia				
1938	Lewis Martin	United Australia				
1941	George Mitchell	Independent				
1944	Les Jordan	Independent Country				
1947	Les Jordan	Country				
1950	Les Jordan	Country				
1953	Les Jordan	Country				
1956	Les Jordan	Country				
1959	Les Jordan	Liberal				
1962	Les Jordan	Liberal				
1965	Les Jordan	Liberal				
1965 by	Bruce Cowan	Country				
1968	Bruce Cowan	Country				
1971	Bruce Cowan	Country				
1973	Bruce Cowan	Country				
1976	Bruce Cowan	Country				
1978	Bruce Cowan	National Country				
1981 by	Peter King	National Country				
1981	Jim Brown	National Country				
1984	Bruce Jeffery	National				
Second incarnation (1991–present)
Election	Member	Party				
1991	Bruce Jeffery	National				
1995	Bruce Jeffery	National				
1999	Andrew Stoner	National				
2003	Andrew Stoner	National				
2007	Andrew Stoner	National				
2011	Andrew Stoner	National				
2015	Melinda Pavey	National				
2019	Melinda Pavey	National				
2023	Michael Kemp	National				

== Election results ==
=== Elections in the 2020s ===
==== 2023 ====
2023 New South Wales state election: Oxley
Party	Candidate	Votes	%	±%
National	Michael Kemp	24,987	47.5	−4.9
Labor	Gregory Vigors	9,899	18.8	−1.5
Greens	Dominic King	7,420	14.1	+1.6
Legalise Cannabis	Megan Mathew	4,708	8.9	+8.9
Independent	Joshua Fairhall	2,878	5.5	+5.5
Sustainable Australia	Bianca Drain	1,400	2.7	−1.0
Independent	Troy Irwin	1,316	2.5	+2.5
Total formal votes		52,608	96.5	+0.1
Informal votes		1,880	3.5	−0.1
Turnout		54,488	86.7	−1.7
Two-party-preferred result
National	Michael Kemp	27,132	62.8	−2.6
Labor	Gregory Vigors	16,047	37.2	+2.6
National hold		Swing	−2.6	

=== Elections in the 2010s ===
==== 2019 ====
2019 New South Wales state election: Oxley
Party	Candidate	Votes	%	±%
National	Melinda Pavey	25,115	51.74	−0.93
Labor	Susan Jenvey	9,904	20.40	−6.28
Greens	Arthur Bain	6,179	12.73	−2.39
Shooters, Fishers, Farmers	Dean Saul	5,644	11.63	+11.63
Sustainable Australia	Debbie Smythe	1,698	3.50	+3.50
Total formal votes		48,540	96.50	−0.20
Informal votes		1,761	3.50	+0.20
Turnout		50,301	88.05	−1.07
Two-party-preferred result
National	Melinda Pavey	27,111	64.89	+3.98
Labor	Susan Jenvey	14,672	35.11	−3.98
National hold		Swing	+3.98	

==== 2015 ====
2015 New South Wales state election: Oxley
Party	Candidate	Votes	%	±%
National	Melinda Pavey	24,504	52.7	−14.2
Labor	Fran Armitage	12,414	26.7	+14.1
Greens	Carol Vernon	7,032	15.1	+2.8
Christian Democrats	John Klose	1,382	3.0	+1.2
No Land Tax	Joe Costa	1,187	2.6	+2.6
Total formal votes		46,519	96.7	−0.6
Informal votes		1,588	3.3	+0.6
Turnout		48,107	89.1	−1.3
Two-party-preferred result
National	Melinda Pavey	25,636	60.9	−17.9
Labor	Fran Armitage	16,454	39.1	+17.9
National hold		Swing	−17.9	

==== 2011 ====
2011 New South Wales state election: Oxley
Party	Candidate	Votes	%	±%
National	Andrew Stoner	29,412	66.9	+7.8
Greens	Jeremy Bradley	5,506	12.5	+1.8
Labor	Joe Blackshield	5,425	12.3	−12.6
Hatton's Independent Team	Richard McGovern	2,251	5.1	+5.1
Christian Democrats	John Klose	779	1.8	+1.8
Independent	Marcus Aussie-Stone	594	1.4	+1.4
Total formal votes		43,967	97.7	−0.1
Informal votes		1,038	2.3	+0.1
Turnout		45,005	92.2	
Notional two-party-preferred count
National	Andrew Stoner	30,851	79.1	+13.2
Labor	Joe Blackshield	8,162	20.9	−13.2
Two-candidate-preferred result
National	Andrew Stoner	30,994	78.8	+12.8
Greens	Jeremy Bradley	8,358	21.2	+21.2
National hold		Swing	+12.8	

=== Elections in the 2000s ===
==== 2007 ====
2007 New South Wales state election: Oxley
Party	Candidate	Votes	%	±%
National	Andrew Stoner	24,750	59.1	+8.0
Labor	Stuart Holmes	10,452	25.0	−5.9
Greens	Gabrielle Tindall	4,480	10.7	+1.0
AAFI	Brian Gardyne	1,265	3.0	+3.0
Democrats	Sherry Stumm	929	2.2	+2.2
Total formal votes		41,876	97.8	−0.1
Informal votes		931	2.2	+0.1
Turnout		42,807	92.5	
Two-party-preferred result
National	Andrew Stoner	25,657	65.9	+6.0
Labor	Stuart Holmes	13,261	34.1	−6.0
National hold		Swing	+6.0	

==== 2003 ====
2003 New South Wales state election: Oxley
Party	Candidate	Votes	%	±%
National	Andrew Stoner	21,855	53.9	+17.6
Labor	Gerard Hayes	13,366	33.0	+8.6
Greens	Jeremy Bradley	3,379	8.3	+4.5
One Nation	Helen Fearn	1,951	4.8	−14.0
Total formal votes		40,551	97.9	−0.2
Informal votes		891	2.1	+0.2
Turnout		41,442	93.1	
Two-party-preferred result
National	Andrew Stoner	22,808	60.0	+2.0
Labor	Gerard Hayes	15,237	40.0	−2.0
National hold		Swing	+2.0	

=== Elections in the 1990s ===
==== 1999 ====
1999 New South Wales state election: Oxley
Party	Candidate	Votes	%	±%
National	Andrew Stoner	14,187	36.3	−24.4
Labor	Jacquie Argent	9,548	24.4	−5.2
One Nation	John Willey	7,366	18.8	+18.8
Independent	Betty Green	2,726	7.0	+7.0
Independent	Paul Parkinson	2,011	5.1	+5.1
Greens	Sally Cavanagh	1,495	3.8	−2.5
Democrats	Brigitte Williams	1,089	2.8	+2.8
Independent	Tom Henderson	686	1.8	+1.8
Total formal votes		39,108	98.1	+1.8
Informal votes		770	1.9	−1.8
Turnout		39,878	93.7	
Two-party-preferred result
National	Andrew Stoner	17,503	58.0	−6.6
Labor	Jacquie Argent	12,687	42.0	+6.6
National hold		Swing	−6.6	

==== 1995 ====
1995 New South Wales state election: Oxley
Party	Candidate	Votes	%	±%
National	Bruce Jeffery	20,773	61.2	+3.8
Labor	Mary Murtagh	10,065	29.7	−4.0
Greens	Garry Graham	2,134	6.3	+6.3
Environment Inds	James Sanders	969	2.9	+2.9
Total formal votes		33,941	96.3	+2.6
Informal votes		1,319	3.7	−2.6
Turnout		35,260	93.8	
Two-party-preferred result
National	Bruce Jeffery	21,484	64.8	+3.3
Labor	Mary Murtagh	11,674	35.2	−3.3
National hold		Swing	+3.3	

==== 1991 ====
1991 New South Wales state election: Oxley
Party	Candidate	Votes	%	±%
National	Bruce Jeffery	17,896	57.4	−12.2
Labor	Paul Sekfy	10,476	33.6	+5.1
Democrats	Dean Jefferys	2,267	7.3	+5.4
Citizens Electoral Council	Kenneth Robertson	529	1.7	+1.7
Total formal votes		31,168	93.7	−3.9
Informal votes		2,104	6.3	+3.9
Turnout		33,272	94.2	
Two-party-preferred result
National	Bruce Jeffery	18,513	61.5	−9.0
Labor	Paul Sekfy	11,579	38.5	+9.0
National hold		Swing	−9.0	

District recreated

==== 1988–1991 ====
District abolished

=== Elections in the 1980s ===
==== 1984 ====
1984 New South Wales state election: Oxley
Party	Candidate	Votes	%	±%
National	Bruce Jeffery	15,769	43.9	−17.6
Labor	George Viskauskas	10,457	29.1	−9.4
Independent	John Barrett	8,677	24.2	+24.2
Democrats	William Giles	997	2.8	+2.8
Total formal votes		35,900	98.6	+0.6
Informal votes		511	1.4	−0.6
Turnout		36,411	90.3	−2.9
Two-party-preferred result
National	Bruce Jeffery	21,387	62.7	+1.2
Labor	George Viskauskas	12,699	37.3	−1.2
National hold		Swing	+1.2	

==== 1981 ====
1981 New South Wales state election: Oxley
Party	Candidate	Votes	%	±%
National Country	Jim Brown	20,358	61.5	−1.0
Labor	Alick Rogers	12,754	38.5	+1.0
Total formal votes		33,112	98.0	
Informal votes		684	2.0	
Turnout		33,796	93.2	
National Country hold		Swing	−1.0	

==== 1981 by-election ====
1981 Oxley by-election Saturday 21 February
Party	Candidate	Votes	%	±%
National Country	Peter King	15,562	61.7	−0.8
Labor	John Eastman	9,675	38.34	+0.8
Total formal votes		25,237	98.85	+0.4
Informal votes		165	0.9	−0.4
Turnout		25,531	79.7	−15.0
National Country hold		Swing	−0.8	

Bruce Cowan (National Country) resigned to successfully contest the seat of contested the federal seat of Lyne.

=== Elections in the 1970s ===
==== 1978 ====
1978 New South Wales state election: Oxley
Party	Candidate	Votes	%	±%
National Country	Bruce Cowan	16,497	62.5	−6.7
Labor	John Eastman	9,901	37.5	+6.7
Total formal votes		26,398	98.5	−0.3
Informal votes		388	1.5	+0.3
Turnout		26,786	94.7	−0.4
National Country hold		Swing	−6.7	

==== 1976 ====
1976 New South Wales state election: Oxley
Party	Candidate	Votes	%	±%
Country	Bruce Cowan	16,672	69.2	−0.9
Labor	Peter Tullgren	7,415	30.8	+3.9
Total formal votes		24,087	98.8	+0.1
Informal votes		291	1.2	−0.1
Turnout		24,378	95.1	−0.4
Country hold		Swing	−3.3	

==== 1973 ====
1973 New South Wales state election: Oxley
Party	Candidate	Votes	%	±%
Country	Bruce Cowan	15,020	70.1	−6.7
Labor	Bruce Langford	5,772	26.9	+26.9
Democratic Labor	Gary Phillips	630	2.9	+2.9
Total formal votes		21,422	98.7	
Informal votes		287	1.3	
Turnout		21,709	95.5	
Two-party-preferred result
Country	Bruce Cowan	15,558	72.6	−4.2
Labor	Bruce Langford	6,627	27.4	+27.4
Country hold		Swing	−4.2	

==== 1971 ====
1971 New South Wales state election: Oxley
Party	Candidate	Votes	%	±%
Country	Bruce Cowan	14,539	76.8	−3.7
Independent	Joe Cordner	4,396	23.2	+3.7
Total formal votes		18,935	97.6	
Informal votes		466	2.4	
Turnout		19,401	94.8	
Country hold		Swing	−3.7	

=== Elections in the 1960s ===
==== 1968 ====
1968 New South Wales state election: Oxley
Party	Candidate	Votes	%	±%
Country	Bruce Cowan	16,765	80.5	+80.5
Independent	Joe Cordner	4,063	19.5	+17.6
Total formal votes		20,828	97.7	
Informal votes		500	2.3	
Turnout		21,328	95.5	
Country gain from Liberal		Swing	N/A	

==== 1965 by-election ====
1965 Oxley by-election Saturday 6 November
Party	Candidate	Votes	%	±%
Country	Bruce Cowan	6,286	32.9	+32.9
Labor	Joseph Andrews	7,059	37.0	+0.9
Liberal	Alfred Dennis	5,047	26.5	
Independent	John Martin	584	3.1	
Independent	Joe Cordner	106	0.6	
Total formal votes		19,082	97.9	−0.9
Informal votes		410	2.1	+0.9
Turnout		19,492	90.7	−3.5
Two-party-preferred result
Country	Bruce Cowan	11,402	59.8	
Labor	Joseph Andrews	7,680	40.3	
Country gain from Liberal		Swing	N/A	

Les Jordan (Liberal) died.

==== 1965 ====
1965 New South Wales state election: Oxley
Party	Candidate	Votes	%	±%
Liberal	Les Jordan	12,662	61.9	+20.6
Labor	Joseph Andrews	7,383	36.1	+0.7
Independent	Joe Cordner	397	1.9	+1.9
Total formal votes		20,442	99.0	0.0
Informal votes		198	1.0	0.0
Turnout		20,640	96.4	−0.3
Two-party-preferred result
Liberal	Les Jordan	12,900	63.1	+1.8
Labor	Joseph Andrews	7,542	36.9	−1.8
Liberal hold		Swing	+1.8	

==== 1962 ====
1962 New South Wales state election: Oxley
Party	Candidate	Votes	%	±%
Liberal	Les Jordan	8,311	41.3	+41.3
Labor	Joseph Andrews	7,117	35.4	+35.4
Country	Bruce Cowan	4,440	22.1	−45.1
Independent	William Kennewell	254	1.3	+1.3
Total formal votes		20,122	99.0	
Informal votes		194	1.0	
Turnout		20,316	96.7	
Two-party-preferred result
Liberal	Les Jordan	12,325	61.2	+61.2
Labor	Joseph Andrews	7,797	38.8	+38.8
Member changed to Liberal from Country		Swing	N/A	

=== Elections in the 1950s ===
==== 1959 ====
1959 New South Wales state election: Oxley
Party	Candidate	Votes	%	±%
Country	Les Jordan	13,029	67.2	
Independent	Duncan Kennedy	4,774	24.6	
Independent	Joseph Cordner	1,597	8.2	
Total formal votes		19,400	98.7	
Informal votes		256	1.3	
Turnout		19,656	96.1	
Two-candidate-preferred result
Country	Les Jordan	13,828	71.3	
Independent	Duncan Kennedy	5,572	28.7	
Country hold		Swing		

==== 1956 ====
1956 New South Wales state election: Oxley
Party	Candidate	Votes	%	±%
Country	Les Jordan	10,695	58.6	+3.4
Labor	William Kennewell	6,769	37.1	+0.8
Independent	Joe Cordner	780	4.3	+2.5
Total formal votes		18,244	99.1	+0.6
Informal votes		174	0.9	−0.6
Turnout		18,418	93.1	−3.4
Two-party-preferred result
Country	Les Jordan	11,085	60.8	+0.1
Labor	William Kennewell	7,159	39.2	−0.1
Country hold		Swing	+0.1	

==== 1953 ====
1953 New South Wales state election: Oxley
Party	Candidate	Votes	%	±%
Country	Les Jordan	9,839	55.2	
Labor	William Kennewell	6,480	36.3	
Independent	Alan Borthwick	1,190	6.7	
Independent	Joseph Cordner	327	1.8	
Total formal votes		17,836	98.5	
Informal votes		273	1.5	
Turnout		18,109	96.5	
Two-party-preferred result
Country	Les Jordan	10,826	60.7	
Labor	William Kennewell	7,010	39.3	
Country hold		Swing		

==== 1950 ====
1950 New South Wales state election: Oxley
Party	Candidate	Votes	%	±%
Country	Les Jordan	11,873	72.0	
Labor	William Baker	4,626	28.0	
Total formal votes		16,499	98.9	
Informal votes		185	1.1	
Turnout		16,684	91.7	
Country hold		Swing		

=== Elections in the 1940s ===
==== 1947 ====
1947 New South Wales state election: Oxley
Party	Candidate	Votes	%	±%
Country	Les Jordan	unopposed		
Member changed to Country from Independent Country				

==== 1944 ====
1944 New South Wales state election: Oxley
Party	Candidate	Votes	%	±%
Independent	George Mitchell	5,006	36.0	−18.3
Independent Country	Les Jordan	4,381	31.5	+31.5
Independent Country	Charles Ryan	1,659	11.9	+11.9
Independent Labor	Edward Baxter	1,399	10.1	+10.1
Australia's Labor Movement	William McCristal	844	6.1	+6.1
Independent Country	Samuel Martin	630	4.5	+4.5
Total formal votes		13,919	96.0	−2.8
Informal votes		585	4.0	+2.8
Turnout		14,504	94.6	−0.2
Two-candidate-preferred result
Independent Country	Les Jordan	7,197	51.7	+51.7
Independent	George Mitchell	6,722	48.3	−6.0
Independent Country gain from Independent		Swing	N/A	

==== 1941 ====
1941 New South Wales state election: Oxley
Party	Candidate	Votes	%	±%
Independent	George Mitchell	7,835	54.3	
United Australia	Lewis Martin	6,589	45.7	
Total formal votes		14,424	98.8	
Informal votes		181	1.2	
Turnout		14,605	94.8	
Independent gain from United Australia		Swing		

=== Elections in the 1930s ===
==== 1938 ====
1938 New South Wales state election: Oxley
Party	Candidate	Votes	%	±%
United Australia	Lewis Martin	8,255	55.4	−15.1
Independent	George Mitchell	6,642	44.6	+44.6
Total formal votes		14,897	98.3	0.0
Informal votes		252	1.7	0.0
Turnout		15,149	96.1	−0.1
United Australia hold		Swing	N/A	

==== 1935 ====
1935 New South Wales state election: Oxley
Party	Candidate	Votes	%	±%
United Australia	Lewis Martin	10,192	70.5	−6.7
Labor (NSW)	Francis Hartley	4,269	29.5	+6.7
Total formal votes		14,461	98.3	+0.3
Turnout		14,703	96.2	−0.4
United Australia hold		Swing	+6.7	

==== 1932 ====
1932 New South Wales state election: Oxley
Party	Candidate	Votes	%	±%
United Australia	Lewis Martin	10,273	77.2	+12.8
Labor (NSW)	Joseph Cooper	3,036	22.8	−9.7
Total formal votes		13,309	98.0	+0.1
Informal votes		268	2.0	−0.1
Turnout		13,577	96.6	−0.2
United Australia hold		Swing	N/A	

==== 1930 ====
1930 New South Wales state election: Oxley
Party	Candidate	Votes	%	±%
Nationalist	Lewis Martin	8,153	64.4	
Labor	Alphonsus Ticehurst	4,107	32.5	
Independent	Patrick Moran	222	1.8	
Communist	John Easton	168	1.3	
Total formal votes		12,650	97.9	
Informal votes		272	2.1	
Turnout		12,922	96.8	
Nationalist hold		Swing		

=== Elections in the 1920s ===
==== 1927 ====
1927 New South Wales state election: Oxley
Party	Candidate	Votes	%	±%
Nationalist	Lewis Martin	7,000	61.7	
Independent	John Thomson	3,303	29.1	
Independent	Albert Suters	1,043	9.2	
Total formal votes		11,346	98.9	
Informal votes		129	1.1	
Turnout		11,475	77.9	
Nationalist win		(new seat)		

==== 1925 ====
1925 New South Wales state election: Oxley
Party	Candidate	Votes	%	±%
Quota		7,483		
Progressive	Roy Vincent (elected 2)	6,333	21.2	+8.6
Progressive	Henry Morton	3,423	11.4	+11.4
Progressive	Ray Fitzgerald	1,203	4.0	+4.0
Progressive	William Flannery	955	3.2	+3.2
Nationalist	Theodore Hill (elected 3)	5,598	18.7	+5.9
Nationalist	William Robinson	2,092	7.0	+7.0
Nationalist	John Cameron	1,468	4.9	+4.9
Labor	Joseph Fitzgerald (elected 1)	8,761	29.3	+15.4
Labor	William Terry	59	0.2	+0.2
Labor	James Goudie	38	0.1	+0.1
Total formal votes		29,930	96.5	−0.3
Informal votes		1,068	3.5	+0.3
Turnout		30,998	69.8	−3.2
Party total votes
Progressive		11,914	39.8	−4.9
Nationalist		9,158	30.6	+0.2
Labor		8,858	29.6	+6.3

==== 1922 ====
1922 New South Wales state election: Oxley
Party	Candidate	Votes	%	±%
Quota		7,634		
Progressive	Roy Vincent (elected 2)	3,844	12.6	+12.6
Progressive	Richard Price (defeated)	3,495	11.4	−8.4
Progressive	Lewis Martin	2,116	6.9	+6.9
Progressive	Harold Henderson	1,760	5.8	+5.8
Progressive	Matthew Wallace	1,145	3.8	+3.8
Progressive	Charles Algie	913	3.0	+3.0
Progressive	Albert Whatson	366	1.2	+1.2
Nationalist	Theodore Hill (elected 1)	3,914	12.8	+12.8
Nationalist	Henry Morton	3,622	11.9	−6.1
Nationalist	William McRae	1,748	5.7	+5.7
Labor	Joseph Fitzgerald (elected 3)	4,234	13.9	−9.3
Labor	Alfred O'Neill	2,498	8.2	+8.2
Labor	Frederick Bennett	383	1.3	+1.3
Independent	Patrick Moran	496	1.6	+1.6
Total formal votes		30,534	96.8	+3.4
Informal votes		1,002	3.2	−3.4
Turnout		31,536	73.0	+19.8
Party total votes
Progressive		13,639	44.7	−10.5
Nationalist		9,284	30.4	+12.4
Labor		7,115	23.3	−1.6
Independent	Patrick Moran	496	1.6	+1.6

==== 1920 appointment ====
George Briner died on 9 September 1920. Between 1920 and 1927 the Legislative Assembly was elected using a form of proportional representation with multi-member seats and a single transferable vote (modified Hare-Clark). There was confusion at the time as to the process to be used to fill the vacancy. When George Beeby resigned on 9 August 1920, in accordance with the practice prior to 1920, the Speaker of the Legislative Assembly issued a writ of election requiring a by-election to be conducted, however the Chief Electoral Officer said he couldn't do so under then law at the time and that a by-election would be contrary to the principle of proportional representation. The vacancies were left unfilled until the Parliament passed the Parliamentary Elections (Casual Vacancies) Act on 10 December 1920, so that casual vacancies were filled by the next unsuccessful candidate on the incumbent member's party list. Theodore Hill was the unsuccessful Progressive candidate at the 1920 election and took his seat on 15 December 1920.

==== 1920 ====
1920 New South Wales state election: Oxley
Party	Candidate	Votes	%	±%
Quota		4,773		
Progressive	George Briner (elected 1)	5,000	26.2	
Progressive	Richard Price (elected 3)	3,784	19.8	
Progressive	Theodore Hill	1,757	9.2	
Labor	Joseph Fitzgerald (elected 2)	4,430	23.2	
Labor	John Culbert	243	1.3	
Labor	Robert Pinkerton	77	0.4	
Nationalist	Henry Morton (defeated)	3,437	18.0	
Independent	Edward Hill	273	1.4	
Independent	Eugene Rudder	87	0.5	
Total formal votes		19,088	93.4	
Informal votes		1,348	6.6	
Turnout		20,436	53.2	
Party total votes
Progressive		10,541	55.2	
Labor		4,750	24.9	
Nationalist		3,437	18.0	
Independent	Edward Hill	273	1.4	
Independent	Eugene Rudder	87	0.5	
