= Electoral results for the district of Gloucester =

Election results for Gloucester, New South Wales, Australia

Gloucester an electoral district of the Legislative Assembly in the Australian state of New South Wales had two incarnations from 1880 until 1920 and from 1927 until 1988.

Election	Member	Party
1880	Archibald Jacob	None
1882	Robert White	None
1885	Robert White	None
1887	Jonathan Seaver	Free Trade
1889	Jonathan Seaver	Free Trade
1891	John Hart	Free Trade
1894	Richard Price	Protectionist
1895	Richard Price	Protectionist
1898	Richard Price	Protectionist
1901	Richard Price	Independent
1904	James Young	Liberal Reform
1907	Richard Price	Independent
1910	Richard Price	Liberal Reform
1913	Richard Price	Farmers and Settlers
1917	Richard Price	Independent
1917 by	Richard Price	Independent
Election	Member	Party
1927	Walter Bennett	Nationalist
1930	Walter Bennett	Nationalist
1932	Walter Bennett	United Australia
1934 by	Charles Bennett	United Australia
1935	Charles Bennett	United Australia
1938	Charles Bennett	United Australia
1941	Ray Fitzgerald	Independent
1944	Ray Fitzgerald	Independent
1947	Ray Fitzgerald	Independent
1950	Ray Fitzgerald	Country
1953	Ray Fitzgerald	Country
1956	Ray Fitzgerald	Country
1959	Ray Fitzgerald	Country
1962	Leon Punch	Country
1965	Leon Punch	Country
1968	Leon Punch	Country
1971	Leon Punch	Country
1973	Leon Punch	Country
1976	Leon Punch	Country
1978	Leon Punch	Country
1981	Leon Punch	National Country
1984	Leon Punch	National
1985 by	Wendy Machin	National

== Election results ==
=== Elections in the 1980s ===
==== 1985 by-election ====
1985 Gloucester by-election Saturday 1 February
Party	Candidate	Votes	%	±%
National	Wendy Machin	21,461	68.32	
Independent	Rodney Hickman	7,096	22.59	
Nuclear Disarmament	Marie-Anne Hockings	2,589	8.24	
Small Business and Enterprise Party	Kusala Fitzroy-Mendis	161	0.51	
Small Business and Enterprise Party	Stanley Fitzroy-Mendis	104	0.33	
Total formal votes		31,411	97.62	
Informal votes		765	2.38	
Turnout		32,176	81.02	
National hold		Swing		

National MP Leon Punch resigned.

==== 1984 ====
1984 New South Wales state election: Gloucester
Party	Candidate	Votes	%	±%
National	Leon Punch	21,678	61.9	+1.7
Labor	John Eastman	13,360	38.1	−1.7
Total formal votes		35,038	97.8	−0.4
Informal votes		777	2.2	+0.4
Turnout		35,815	94.2	+0.5
National hold		Swing	+1.7	

==== 1981 ====
1981 New South Wales state election: Gloucester
Party	Candidate	Votes	%	±%
National Country	Leon Punch	19,261	60.2	
Labor	John Eastman	12,721	39.8	
Total formal votes		31,982	98.2	
Informal votes		578	1.8	
Turnout		32,560	93.7	
National Country hold		Swing	−5.4	

=== Elections in the 1970s ===
==== 1978 ====
1978 New South Wales state election: Gloucester
Party	Candidate	Votes	%	±%
National Country	Leon Punch	14,265	55.4	−6.2
Labor	Ronald Aiken	9,551	37.1	+7.8
Independent	Bruce MacKenzie	1,942	7.5	+7.5
Total formal votes		25,758	98.5	−0.6
Informal votes		404	1.5	+0.6
Turnout		26,162	93.9	+0.1
Two-party-preferred result
National Country	Leon Punch	15,236	59.2	−10.0
Labor	Ronald Aiken	10,522	40.8	+10.0
National Country hold		Swing	−10.0	

==== 1976 ====
1976 New South Wales state election: Gloucester
Party	Candidate	Votes	%	±%
Country	Leon Punch	14,160	61.6	−3.6
Labor	Johannes Winkelman	6,723	29.3	+7.0
Independent	Herbert Collins	2,085	9.1	−3.4
Total formal votes		22,968	99.1	+0.5
Informal votes		219	0.9	−0.5
Turnout		23,187	93.8	+1.1
Two-party-preferred result
Country	Leon Punch	15,886	69.2	−6.0
Labor	Johannes Winkelman	7,082	30.8	+6.0
Country hold		Swing	−6.0	

==== 1973 ====
1973 New South Wales state election: Gloucester
Party	Candidate	Votes	%	±%
Country	Leon Punch	12,708	65.2	+3.1
Labor	Terence Wallis	4,355	22.3	−5.3
Democratic Labor	Herbert Collins	2,435	12.5	+12.5
Total formal votes		19,498	98.6	
Informal votes		273	1.4	
Turnout		19,771	92.7	
Two-party-preferred result
Country	Leon Punch	14,656	75.2	+10.4
Labor	Terence Wallis	4,842	24.8	−10.4
Country hold		Swing	+10.4	

==== 1971 ====
1971 New South Wales state election: Gloucester
Party	Candidate	Votes	%	±%
Country	Leon Punch	12,720	62.1	+2.3
Labor	Terence Wallis	5,664	27.6	+4.5
Independent	James Bogan	2,112	10.3	+10.3
Total formal votes		20,496	98.9	
Informal votes		217	1.1	
Turnout		20,713	93.8	
Two-party-preferred result
Country	Leon Punch	13,987	68.2	−4.5
Labor	Terence Wallis	6,509	31.8	+4.5
Country hold		Swing	−4.5	

=== Elections in the 1960s ===
==== 1968 ====
1968 New South Wales state election: Gloucester
Party	Candidate	Votes	%	±%
Country	Leon Punch	11,152	59.8	−13.4
Labor	Philip Jackson	4,305	23.1	+23.1
Independent	Bob Scott	1,325	7.1	−19.7
Independent	Charles Buckingham	973	5.2	+5.2
Independent	John Tully	891	4.8	+4.8
Total formal votes		18,646	98.0	
Informal votes		375	2.0	
Turnout		19,021	95.1	
Two-party-preferred result
Country	Leon Punch	13,066	70.1	−3.1
Labor	Philip Jackson	5,580	29.9	+29.9
Country hold		Swing	−3.1	

==== 1965 ====
1965 New South Wales state election: Gloucester
Party	Candidate	Votes	%	±%
Country	Leon Punch	14,337	73.2	+29.4
Independent	Bob Scott	5,249	26.8	+26.8
Total formal votes		19,586	98.5	−0.4
Informal votes		306	1.5	+0.4
Turnout		19,892	95.7	−0.1
Country hold		Swing	N/A	

==== 1962 ====
1962 New South Wales state election: Gloucester
Party	Candidate	Votes	%	±%
Country	Leon Punch	8,590	43.8	−13.4
Labor	Loris Kable	5,801	29.6	+29.6
Country	Alan Borthwick	4,576	23.3	+23.3
Democratic Labor	Aubrey Barr	640	3.3	+3.3
Total formal votes		19,607	98.9	
Informal votes		214	1.1	
Turnout		19,821	95.8	
Two-party-preferred result
Country	Leon Punch	12,567	64.1	+6.9
Labor	Loris Kable	7,040	35.9	+35.9
Country hold		Swing	N/A	

=== Elections in the 1950s ===
==== 1959 ====
1959 New South Wales state election: Gloucester
Party	Candidate	Votes	%	±%
Country	Ray Fitzgerald	9,490	57.2	
Independent	Alan Borthwick	7,109	42.8	
Total formal votes		16,599	98.1	
Informal votes		325	1.9	
Turnout		16,924	94.5	
Country hold		Swing		

==== 1956 ====
1956 New South Wales state election: Gloucester
Party	Candidate	Votes	%	±%
Country	Ray Fitzgerald	10,307	65.4	+2.4
Labor	Thomas Breen	5,440	34.6	−2.4
Total formal votes		15,747	98.7	+0.5
Informal votes		206	1.3	−0.5
Turnout		15,953	92.0	−2.8
Country hold		Swing	+2.4	

==== 1953 ====
1953 New South Wales state election: Gloucester
Party	Candidate	Votes	%	±%
Country	Ray Fitzgerald	9,696	63.0	
Labor	Percy Randle	5,694	37.0	
Total formal votes		15,390	98.2	
Informal votes		276	1.8	
Turnout		15,666	94.8	
Country hold		Swing		

==== 1950 ====
1950 New South Wales state election: Gloucester
Party	Candidate	Votes	%	±%
Labor	Edward Robb	4,792	30.2	
Country	Ray Fitzgerald	4,711	29.7	
Liberal	Roderick Richardson	3,601	22.7	
Country	Bruce Cowan	2,577	16.2	
Independent	William McCristal	180	1.1	
Total formal votes		15,861	97.8	
Informal votes		360	2.2	
Turnout		16,221	90.3	
Two-party-preferred result
Country	Ray Fitzgerald	10,488	66.1	
Labor	Edward Robb	5,373	33.9	
Member changed to Country from Independent		Swing	N/A	

=== Elections in the 1940s ===
==== 1947 ====
1947 New South Wales state election: Gloucester
Party	Candidate	Votes	%	±%
Independent	Ray Fitzgerald	5,650	41.4	+0.4
Country	Donald Mackay	4,194	30.7	+9.7
Liberal	Alan Borthwick	3,066	22.5	−15.4
Independent	James Bogan	366	2.7	+2.7
Independent	Edwin Dark	366	2.7	+2.7
Total formal votes		13,642	97.2	−1.0
Informal votes		396	2.8	+1.0
Turnout		14,038	94.8	+2.2
Two-candidate-preferred result
Independent	Ray Fitzgerald	6,885	50.5	+0.3
Country	Donald Mackay	6,757	49.5	+49.5
Independent hold		Swing	+0.3	

==== 1944 ====
1944 New South Wales state election: Gloucester
Party	Candidate	Votes	%	±%
Independent	Ray Fitzgerald	5,194	41.0	+16.5
Democratic	Harold Young	4,805	37.9	+4.8
Country	Charles Bennett	2,665	21.0	+21.0
Total formal votes		12,664	98.2	−0.9
Informal votes		124	0.9	+0.9
Turnout		12,894	92.6	−2.3
Two-candidate-preferred result
Independent	Ray Fitzgerald	6,362	50.2	−1.3
Democratic	Harold Young	6,302	49.8	+1.3
Independent hold		Swing	−1.3	

==== 1941 ====
1941 New South Wales state election: Gloucester
Party	Candidate	Votes	%	±%
United Australia	Charles Bennett	4,494	33.1	
Labor	William Morgan	3,735	27.5	
Independent	Ray Fitzgerald	3,321	24.5	
Independent	Robert Bruce	2,031	14.9	
Total formal votes		13,581	99.1	
Informal votes		124	0.9	
Turnout		13,705	94.9	
Two-candidate-preferred result
Independent	Ray Fitzgerald	6,999	51.5	
United Australia	Charles Bennett	6,582	48.5	
Independent gain from United Australia		Swing		

=== Elections in the 1930s ===
==== 1938 ====
1938 New South Wales state election: Gloucester
Party	Candidate	Votes	%	±%
United Australia	Charles Bennett	7,732	54.3	−45.7
Independent	Ray Fitzgerald	5,010	35.2	+35.2
Independent	Henry Rooke	1,492	10.5	+10.5
Total formal votes		14,234	98.4	
Informal votes		238	1.6	
Turnout		14,472	96.2	
United Australia hold		Swing	N/A	

- Preferences were not distributed.

==== 1935 ====
1935 New South Wales state election: Gloucester
Party	Candidate	Votes	%	±%
United Australia	Charles Bennett	unopposed		
United Australia hold				

==== 1934 by-election ====
1934 Gloucester by-election Saturday 25 August
Party	Candidate	Votes	%	±%
United Australia	Charles Bennett	6,868	53.2	+2.6
Country	George Waller	3,531	27.4	+27.4
Country	William Hawdon	2,506	19.4	−10.6
Total formal votes		12,905	97.2	−1.1
Informal votes		374	2.8	+1.1
Turnout		13,279	89.9	−6.3
United Australia hold		Swing	N/A	

- Preferences were not distributed.
- The by-election was triggered by the death of Walter Bennett, (United Australia).

==== 1932 ====
1932 New South Wales state election: Gloucester
Party	Candidate	Votes	%	±%
United Australia	Walter Bennett	6,620	50.6	−20.1
Independent Country	William Hawdon	3,930	30.0	+30.0
Labor (NSW)	William Campbell	1,959	15.0	−14.3
Independent	William Flannery	569	4.4	+4.4
Total formal votes		13,078	98.3	−0.3
Informal votes		229	1.7	+0.3
Turnout		13,307	96.2	+1.8
United Australia hold		Swing	N/A	

- Preferences were not distributed.

==== 1930 ====
1930 New South Wales state election: Gloucester
Party	Candidate	Votes	%	±%
Nationalist	Walter Bennett	8,731	70.7	
Labor	Willie Harris	3,622	29.3	
Total formal votes		12,353	98.6	
Informal votes		178	1.4	
Turnout		12,531	94.4	
Nationalist hold		Swing		

=== Elections in the 1920s ===
==== 1927 ====
1927 New South Wales state election: Gloucester
Party	Candidate	Votes	%	±%
Nationalist	Walter Bennett	6,146	52.2	
Ind. Nationalist	William Brown	2,687	22.8	
Labor	Henry Hall	1,650	14.0	
Independent	William Flannery	1,293	11.0	
Total formal votes		11,776	98.6	
Informal votes		167	1.4	
Turnout		11,943	81.3	
Nationalist win		(new seat)		

District re-established

==== 1920 - 1927 ====
District abolished

=== Elections in the 1910s ===
==== 1917 by-election ====
1917 Gloucester by-election Saturday 10 November
Party	Candidate	Votes	%	±%
Independent	Richard Price (re-elected)	3,740	59.6	+3.6
Nationalist	Lewis Martin	2,999	40.4	−3.6
Total formal votes		6,275	100.0	+0.3
Informal votes		0	0.0	−0.3
Turnout		6,275	62.7 (Note: Estimate based on a roll of 10,015 at the 1917 election.)	−5.6
Independent hold		Swing	+3.6	

Richard Price (Independent) was expelled from Parliament for abusing parliamentary privilege by making baseless allegations against William Ashford, the Secretary for Lands.

==== 1917 ====
1917 New South Wales state election: Gloucester
Party	Candidate	Votes	%	±%
Nationalist	Lewis Martin	2,671	40.8	+40.8
Independent	Richard Price	2,390	36.5	−17.2
Labor	Albert Jones	1,487	22.7	+2.1
Total formal votes		6,548	99.2	+1.2
Informal votes		54	0.8	−1.2
Turnout		6,602	65.9	−5.2

1917 New South Wales state election: Gloucester - Second Round
Party	Candidate	Votes	%	±%
Independent	Richard Price	3,815	56.0	
Nationalist	Lewis Martin	2,999	44.0	
Total formal votes		6,814	99.7	+0.5
Informal votes		22	0.3	−0.5
Turnout		6,836	68.3	+2.4
Member changed to Independent from Farmers and Settlers / Nationalist				

Richard Price had been elected as a Farmers and Settlers member in the 1913 election. He joined the Nationalist Party however he was not endorsed by the party for the 1917 election and ran as an independent.

==== 1913 ====
1913 New South Wales state election: Gloucester
Party	Candidate	Votes	%	±%
Farmers and Settlers	Richard Price (Note: Also endorsed by Liberal Reform.)	3,750	53.7	
Labor	Albert Jones	1,441	20.6	
Country Party Association	David Cowan	1,372	19.7	
Independent	Robert Malcolm	420	6.0	
Total formal votes		6,983	98.0	
Informal votes		140	2.0	
Turnout		7,123	71.1	
Member changed to Farmers and Settlers from Liberal Reform				

==== 1910 ====
1910 New South Wales state election: Gloucester
Party	Candidate	Votes	%	±%
Liberal Reform	Richard Price	4,608	65.3	+12.6
Labour	Con Hogan	1,943	27.5	
Independent	James Gregg	506	7.2	
Total formal votes		7,057	97.0	−0.1
Informal votes		222	3.0	+0.1
Turnout		7,279	65.9	−7.1
Member changed to Liberal Reform from Independent				

=== Elections in the 1900s ===
==== 1907 ====
1907 New South Wales state election: Gloucester
Party	Candidate	Votes	%	±%
Independent	Richard Price	2,854	52.7	
Liberal Reform	James Young	2,407	44.4	
Independent	Henry Gardem	160	3.0	
Total formal votes		5,421	97.1	
Informal votes		160	2.9	
Turnout		5,581	73.0	
Independent gain from Liberal Reform (Note: Richard Price had put his name forward as a Liberal candidate, however James Young was endorsed by the central executive.)				

==== 1904 ====
1904 New South Wales state election: Gloucester
Party	Candidate	Votes	%	±%
Liberal Reform	James Young	2,635	57.4	
Progressive	John Thomson	1,955	42.6	
Total formal votes		4,590	99.7	
Informal votes		12	0.3	
Turnout		4,602	70.1	
Liberal Reform gain from Independent				

Gloucester lost part of the district to Durham and absorbed part of Manning. The member for Gloucester was Richard Price (Independent) who nominated to contest Durham however he withdrew from the contest. John Thomson (Progressive) was the member for Manning.

==== 1901 ====
1901 New South Wales state election: Gloucester
Party	Candidate	Votes	%	±%
Independent	Richard Price	981	79.4	+15.5
Liberal Reform	Alfred Lee	255	20.6	−15.5
Total formal votes		1,236	99.8	+0.2
Informal votes		3	0.2	−0.2
Turnout		1,239	48.3	−12.4
Member changed to Independent from Progressive				

=== Elections in the 1890s ===
==== 1898 ====
1898 New South Wales colonial election: Gloucester
Party	Candidate	Votes	%	±%
National Federal	Richard Price	859	63.9	
Free Trade	Frederick Hooke	486	36.1	
Total formal votes		1,345	99.6	
Informal votes		6	0.4	
Turnout		1,351	60.7	
National Federal hold				

==== 1895 ====
1895 New South Wales colonial election: Gloucester
Party	Candidate	Votes	%	±%
Protectionist	Richard Price	904	86.5	
Independent Labour	William Ellingworth	141	13.5	
Total formal votes		1,045	99.5	
Informal votes		5	0.5	
Turnout		1,050	48.2	
Protectionist hold				

==== 1894 ====
1894 New South Wales colonial election: Gloucester
Party	Candidate	Votes	%	±%
Protectionist	Richard Price	1,084	59.8	
Free Trade	John Hart	591	32.6	
Ind. Protectionist	Donald McKinnon	109	6.0	
Independent Labour	William Ellingworth	29	1.6	
Total formal votes		1,813	98.9	
Informal votes		20	1.1	
Turnout		1,833	84.7	
Protectionist gain from Free Trade				

==== 1891 ====
1891 New South Wales colonial election: Gloucester Saturday 27 June
Party	Candidate	Votes	%	±%
Free Trade	John Hart (elected)	613	52.5	
Protectionist	Richard Price	555	47.5	
Total formal votes		1,168	99.5	
Informal votes		6	0.5	
Turnout		1,174	70.6	
Free Trade hold				

The sitting member, Jonathan Seaver (Free Trade), unsuccessfully contested St Leonards because of his opposition to the leadership of Sir Henry Parkes.

=== Elections in the 1880s ===
==== 1889 ====
1889 New South Wales colonial election: Gloucester Saturday 16 February
Party	Candidate	Votes	%	±%
Free Trade	Jonathan Seaver (elected)	369	36.0	
Protectionist	Richard Price	360	35.2	
Free Trade	John Hart	295	28.8	
Total formal votes		1,024	98.8	
Informal votes		12	1.2	
Turnout		1,036	58.5	
Free Trade hold				

==== 1887 ====
1887 New South Wales colonial election: Gloucester Wednesday 23 February
Party	Candidate	Votes	%	±%
Free Trade	Jonathan Seaver (elected)	434	45.4	
Free Trade	John Hart	267	27.9	
Free Trade	John McLaughlin	207	21.7	
Protectionist	George Perry	48	5.0	
Total formal votes		956	98.6	
Informal votes		14	1.4	
Turnout		970	59.2	

John McLaughlin had been unsuccessful in contesting Paddington on 9 February.

==== 1885 ====
1885 New South Wales colonial election: Gloucester Saturday 24 October
Candidate	Votes	%
Robert White (re-elected)	unopposed	

==== 1882 ====
1882 New South Wales colonial election: Gloucester Thursday 21 December
Candidate	Votes	%
Robert White (elected)	445	44.7
Henry Hudson	382	38.4
William Christie	107	10.8
William Johnston	61	6.1
Total formal votes	995	98.8
Informal votes	12	1.2
Turnout	1,007	70.6

Sitting member Archibald Jacob unsuccessfully contested Morpeth.

==== 1880 ====
1880 New South Wales colonial election: Gloucester Saturday 27 November
Candidate	Votes	%
Archibald Jacob (re-elected)	471	50.2
Charles Readett	468	49.8
Total formal votes	939	97.6
Informal votes	23	2.4
Turnout	962	63.0
	(new seat)	

Archibald Jacob was the member for the abolished district of The Lower Hunter.
