= Electoral results for the district of Raleigh =

Election results for Raleigh, New South Wales, Australia

Raleigh, an electoral district of the Legislative Assembly in the Australian state of New South Wales, has had two incarnations, the first from 1894 to 1920, the second from 1927 to 1981.

Election	Member	Party
1894	Patrick Hogan	Protectionist
1895	John McLaughlin	Independent
1898	John McLaughlin	Independent
1901	George Briner	Progressive
1904	George Briner	Progressive
1907	George Briner	Independent Liberal
1910	George Briner	Independent Liberal
1913	George Briner	Country Party Association
1917	George Briner	Nationalist
Election	Member	Party
1927	Roy Vincent	Country
1930	Roy Vincent	Country
1932	Roy Vincent	Country
1935	Roy Vincent	Country
1938	Roy Vincent	Country
1941	Roy Vincent	Country
1944	Roy Vincent	Country
1947	Roy Vincent	Country
1950	Roy Vincent	Country
1953	Radford Gamack	Country
1956	Radford Gamack	Country
1959	Jim Brown	Country
1962	Jim Brown	Country
1965	Jim Brown	Country
1968	Jim Brown	Country
1971	Jim Brown	Country
1973	Jim Brown	Country
1976	Jim Brown	Country
1978	Jim Brown	Country

== Election results ==
=== Elections in the 1970s ===
==== 1978 ====
1978 New South Wales state election: Raleigh
Party	Candidate	Votes	%	±%
National Country	Jim Brown	13,584	55.3	−8.0
Labor	Joseph Moran	10,975	44.7	+8.0
Total formal votes		24,559	98.8	0.0
Informal votes		306	1.2	0.0
Turnout		24,865	94.4	−0.5
National Country hold		Swing	−8.0	

==== 1976 ====
1976 New South Wales state election: Raleigh
Party	Candidate	Votes	%	±%
Country	Jim Brown	14,502	63.3	−5.1
Labor	Joseph Moran	8,402	36.7	+5.1
Total formal votes		22,905	98.8	+0.3
Informal votes		280	1.2	−0.3
Turnout		23,185	94.9	+0.4
Country hold		Swing	−5.1	

==== 1973 ====
1973 New South Wales state election: Raleigh
Party	Candidate	Votes	%	±%
Country	Jim Brown	14,347	68.4	+8.0
Labor	Ken Reed	6,613	31.6	+0.8
Total formal votes		20,960	98.5	
Informal votes		309	1.5	
Turnout		21,269	94.5	
Country hold		Swing	+2.9	

==== 1971 ====
1971 New South Wales state election: Raleigh
Party	Candidate	Votes	%	±%
Country	Jim Brown	11,423	60.4	+4.4
Labor	Sydney Dodds	5,830	30.8	+2.6
Independent	Andrew Boyton	1,648	8.7	+8.7
Total formal votes		18,901	99.0	
Informal votes		197	1.0	
Turnout		19,098	95.6	
Two-party-preferred result
Country	Jim Brown	12,377	65.5	−2.4
Labor	Sydney Dodds	6,524	34.5	+2.4
Country hold		Swing	−2.4	

=== Elections in the 1960s ===
==== 1968 ====
1968 New South Wales state election: Raleigh
Party	Candidate	Votes	%	±%
Country	Jim Brown	12,466	56.0	−8.2
Labor	Robert Melville	6,272	28.2	−7.6
New Staters	Aubrey Barker	3,514	15.8	+15.8
Total formal votes		22,252	98.7	
Informal votes		286	1.3	
Turnout		22,538	96.1	
Two-party-preferred result
Country	Jim Brown	15,102	67.9	+3.7
Labor	Robert Melville	7,150	32.1	−3.7
Country hold		Swing	+3.7	

==== 1965 ====
1965 New South Wales state election: Raleigh
Party	Candidate	Votes	%	±%
Country	Jim Brown	10,972	64.2	+0.7
Labor	Robert Melville	6,114	35.8	−0.7
Total formal votes		17,086	99.2	−0.1
Informal votes		143	0.8	+0.1
Turnout		17,229	96.7	+0.6
Country hold		Swing	+0.7	

==== 1962 ====
1962 New South Wales state election: Raleigh
Party	Candidate	Votes	%	±%
Country	Jim Brown	10,960	63.5	+27.7
Labor	Trevor Owens	6,302	36.5	+1.4
Total formal votes		17,262	99.3	
Informal votes		116	0.7	
Turnout		17,378	96.1	
Country hold		Swing	+3.2	

=== Elections in the 1950s ===
==== 1959 ====
1959 New South Wales state election: Raleigh
Party	Candidate	Votes	%	±%
Labor	William Bailey	7,775	40.1	
Country	Jim Brown	5,967	30.8	
Independent Country	Radford Gamack (defeated)	5,639	29.1	
Total formal votes		19,381	99.0	
Informal votes		189	1.0	
Turnout		19,570	94.5	
Two-party-preferred result
Country	Jim Brown	10,776	55.6	
Labor	William Bailey	8,605	44.4	
Country hold		Swing		

The sitting member Radford Gamack had been elected as a Country member, but contested this election as an independent.

==== 1956 ====
1956 New South Wales state election: Raleigh
Party	Candidate	Votes	%	±%
Country	Radford Gamack	unopposed		
Country hold				

==== 1953 ====
1953 New South Wales state election: Raleigh
Party	Candidate	Votes	%	±%
Labor	Clyde Reid	7,121	37.6	
Country	Radford Gamack	6,918	36.5	
Independent	Gordon Patterson	3,828	20.2	
Country	William Burns	1,092	5.8	
Total formal votes		18,959	98.4	
Informal votes		317	1.6	
Turnout		19,276	96.0	
Two-party-preferred result
Country	Radford Gamack	11,150	58.8	
Labor	Clyde Reid	7,809	41.2	
Country hold		Swing		

==== 1950 ====
1950 New South Wales state election: Raleigh
Party	Candidate	Votes	%	±%
Country	Roy Vincent	unopposed		
Country hold				

=== Elections in the 1940s ===
==== 1947 ====
1947 New South Wales state election: Raleigh
Party	Candidate	Votes	%	±%
Country	Roy Vincent	11,479	67.7	+5.6
Independent Labor	Millicent Christian	5,477	32.3	+32.3
Total formal votes		16,956	98.8	+0.8
Informal votes		198	1.2	−0.8
Turnout		17,154	95.0	+0.9
Country hold		Swing	N/A	

==== 1944 ====
1944 New South Wales state election: Raleigh
Party	Candidate	Votes	%	±%
Country	Roy Vincent	8,948	62.1	+24.1
Labor	Norman Long	5,453	37.9	+2.0
Total formal votes		14,401	98.0	−0.5
Informal votes		290	2.0	+0.5
Turnout		14,691	94.1	+0.5
Country hold		Swing	+5.5	

==== 1941 ====
1941 New South Wales state election: Raleigh
Party	Candidate	Votes	%	±%
Country	Roy Vincent	5,609	38.0	
Labor	John Howard	5,305	35.9	
Country	Les Jordan	3,853	26.1	
Total formal votes		14,767	98.5	
Informal votes		221	1.5	
Turnout		14,988	93.6	
Two-party-preferred result
Country	Roy Vincent	8,362	56.6	
Labor	John Howard	6,405	43.4	
Country hold		Swing		

=== Elections in the 1930s ===
==== 1938 ====
1938 New South Wales state election: Raleigh
Party	Candidate	Votes	%	±%
Country	Roy Vincent	8,659	56.2	−1.3
Independent	Les Jordan	5,429	35.2	+35.2
Labor	John Devine	1,316	8.5	+8.5
Total formal votes		15,404	98.1	−0.2
Informal votes		297	1.9	+0.2
Turnout		15,701	95.1	−0.9
Country hold		Swing	N/A	

- Preferences were not distributed.

==== 1935 ====
1935 New South Wales state election: Raleigh
Party	Candidate	Votes	%	±%
Country	Roy Vincent	8,719	57.5	−19.6
Independent	Arthur Wallace	6,435	42.5	+42.5
Total formal votes		15,154	98.3	0.0
Informal votes		268	1.7	0.0
Turnout		15,422	96.0	−0.3
Country hold		Swing	N/A	

==== 1932 ====
1932 New South Wales state election: Raleigh
Party	Candidate	Votes	%	±%
Country	Roy Vincent	10,537	77.1	+21.1
Labor (NSW)	David Walker	3,133	22.9	−8.0
Total formal votes		13,670	98.3	+0.6
Informal votes		239	1.7	−0.6
Turnout		13,909	96.3	+0.2
Country hold		Swing	N/A	

==== 1930 ====
1930 New South Wales state election: Raleigh
Party	Candidate	Votes	%	±%
Country	Roy Vincent	7,190	56.0	
Labor	Charles Booth	3,966	30.9	
Independent Country	Henry Wood	1,522	11.8	
Independent	Theodore McLennan	161	1.3	
Total formal votes		12,839	97.7	
Informal votes		302	2.3	
Turnout		13,141	96.1	
Country hold		Swing		

=== Elections in the 1920s ===
==== 1927 ====
1927 New South Wales state election: Raleigh
Party	Candidate	Votes	%	±%
Country	Roy Vincent	8,172	73.3	
Labor	John Connolly	2,979	26.7	
Total formal votes		11,151	98.9	
Informal votes		120	1.1	
Turnout		11,271	78.3	
Country win		(new seat)		

District re-created

==== 1920 - 1927 ====
District abolished District abolished

=== Elections in the 1910s ===
==== 1917 ====
1917 New South Wales state election: Raleigh
Party	Candidate	Votes	%	±%
Nationalist	George Briner	4,072	64.7	+64.7
Labor	Francis Collins	2,221	35.3	+21.4
Total formal votes		6,293	99.2	+2.6
Informal votes		235	3.4	−2.6
Turnout		6,344	54.1	−9.8
Nationalist hold				

==== 1913 ====
1913 New South Wales state election: Raleigh
Party	Candidate	Votes	%	±%
Country Party Association	George Briner	3,047	45.9	
Liberal Reform	Henry Boultwood	2,663	40.1	
Labor	Theodore McLennan	925	13.9	
Total formal votes		6,635	96.6	
Informal votes		235	3.4	
Turnout		6,870	63.9	

1913 New South Wales state election: Raleigh - Second Round Saturday 20 December
Party	Candidate	Votes	%	±%
Country Party Association	George Briner	3,925	59.1	
Liberal Reform	Henry Boultwood	2,713	40.9	
Total formal votes		6,638	99.1	
Informal votes		59	0.9	
Turnout		6,697	62.3	
Member changed to Country Party Association from Independent Liberal				

==== 1910 ====
1910 New South Wales state election: Raleigh
Party	Candidate	Votes	%	±%
Independent Liberal	George Briner	4,981	78.3	+14.0
Labour	Clem Johnson	1,382	21.7	+13.1
Total formal votes		6,363	96.9	+2.3
Informal votes		204	3.1	−2.3
Turnout		6,567	61.4	+5.5
Member changed to Independent Liberal from Progressive (defunct)				

=== Elections in the 1900s ===
==== 1907 ====
1907 New South Wales state election: Raleigh
Party	Candidate	Votes	%	±%
Former Progressive	George Briner	2,772	64.3	
Independent Liberal	John McLaughlin	1,172	27.2	
Labour	William McCristal	370	8.6	
Total formal votes		4,314	94.7	
Informal votes		244	5.4	
Turnout		4,558	55.9	
Former Progressive hold				

==== 1904 ====
1904 New South Wales state election: Raleigh
Party	Candidate	Votes	%	±%
Progressive	George Briner	2,173	58.1	
Liberal Reform	John Davis	1,099	29.4	
Independent	Thomas Lobban	471	12.6	
Total formal votes		3,743	99.4	
Informal votes		23	0.6	
Turnout		3,766	58.6	
Progressive hold				

Raleigh lost part of the district to The Clarence and was expanded to include much of The Clarence. The member for Raleigh was George Briner (Progressive). The member for The Clarence was John McFarlane (Progressive) who successfully contested that seat.

==== 1901 ====
1901 New South Wales state election: Raleigh
Party	Candidate	Votes	%	±%
Progressive	George Briner	827	51.1	+12.8
Independent	Henry Boltwood	470	29.0	
Independent	Richard Cooke	154	9.5	
Ind. Progressive	Eugene Rudder	101	6.2	
Independent	Jeremiah Mannix	67	4.1	
Total formal votes		1,619	99.0	−0.3
Informal votes		16	1.0	+0.3
Turnout		1,635	68.6	+5.7
Progressive gain from Independent				

The sitting member John McLaughlin (Independent) did not contest the election.

=== Elections in the 1890s ===
==== 1898 ====
1898 New South Wales colonial election: Raleigh
Party	Candidate	Votes	%	±%
Independent	John McLaughlin	814	61.8	
National Federal	Patrick Hogan	504	38.2	
Total formal votes		1,318	99.3	
Informal votes		9	0.7	
Turnout		1,327	62.9	
Member changed to Independent from Ind. Protectionist				

==== 1895 ====
1895 New South Wales colonial election: Raleigh
Party	Candidate	Votes	%	±%
Ind. Protectionist	John McLaughlin	567	47.8	
Free Trade	James Gregg	313	26.4	
Ind. Protectionist	George Briner	287	24.2	
Ind. Protectionist	Eugene Rudder	20	1.7	
Total formal votes		1,187	99.3	
Informal votes		9	0.8	
Turnout		1,196	67.6	
Ind. Protectionist gain from Protectionist				

==== 1894 ====
1894 New South Wales colonial election: Raleigh
Party	Candidate	Votes	%	±%
Protectionist	Patrick Hogan	399	27.8	
Ind. Protectionist	John McLaughlin	379	26.5	
Ind. Protectionist	John Lynn	253	17.7	
Independent Labour	James Gregg	230	16.1	
Independent	Eugene Rudder	83	5.8	
Ind. Protectionist	William Pullen	66	4.6	
Free Trade	Joseph McKay	23	1.6	
Total formal votes		1,433	98.7	
Informal votes		19	1.3	
Turnout		1,452	81.3	
Protectionist win		(new seat)		
