= 1981 Oxley state by-election =

Election results for Oxley, New South Wales, Australia

A by-election was held for the New South Wales Legislative Assembly electorate of Oxley on 21 February 1981 following the resignation of Bruce Cowan (National Country) to successfully contest the federal seat of Lyne at the 1980 election.

By-elections for the seats of Cessnock, Maitland and Sturt were held on the same day.

== Dates ==
Date	Event
29 August 1980	Resignation of Bruce Cowan.
18 October 1980	1980 Australian federal election
22 January 1981	Writ of election issued by the Speaker of the Legislative Assembly and close of electoral rolls.
29 January 1981	Day of nomination
21 February 1981	Polling day
13 March 1981	Return of writ

== Results ==
1981 Oxley by-election Saturday 21 February
Party	Candidate	Votes	%	±%
National Country	Peter King	15,562	61.7	−0.8
Labor	John Eastman	9,675	38.34	+0.8
Total formal votes		25,237	98.85	+0.4
Informal votes		165	0.9	−0.4
Turnout		25,531	79.7	−15.0
National Country hold		Swing	−0.8	

== Aftermath ==
Peter King's career was to be short-lived. The electoral redistribution for the 1981 state election abolished the nearby electorate of Raleigh, and its Country Party MLA, Jim Brown, chose to challenge King for Oxley preselection rather than contest the new electorate of Coffs Harbour. Brown emerged successful after a controversial preselection campaign, and King was forced to retire at the 1981 election.

== See also ==
- Electoral results for the district of Oxley
- List of New South Wales state by-elections
