= 1917 Gloucester state by-election =

Election result for Gloucester, New South Wales, Australia

A by-election was held for the New South Wales Legislative Assembly electorate of Gloucester on 10 November 1917 because Richard Price (Independent) was expelled from Parliament for abusing parliamentary privilege by making baseless allegations against William Ashford, the Secretary for Lands.

== Background ==
Price made an allegation in Parliament in December 1916 that Ashford acted corruptly in relation to £80,000 spent on a deviation of the railway line between Dubbo and Werris Creek. The following year Price made further allegations against Ashford, including that saw mills were being bought at excess values, salaries were being paid that were not authorised by Parliament and that the government had sold land at £4 per acre and then later resumed it for returned soldiers at a price of £8 5s, an excess cost of £36,000. John Storey (Labor), the Leader of the Opposition, stated that he did not take much notice of statements made by Price, but that if the Minister did not take action against Price "the public will have a right to assume that something wrong is going on".

The response of the government was to appoint Montgomerie Hamilton, a Judge of the District Court, to conduct a Royal Commission into Price's allegations. (Note: It has subsequently been questioned whether the Royal Commission was "a place out of Parliament" and potentially inconsistent with Article 9 of the Bill of Rights 1689 which provides "That the freedom of speech and debates or proceedings in Parliament ought not to be impeached or questioned in any court or place out of Parliament".) The Royal Commission concluded that "the charges made by Mr Price against Mr Ashford were made wantonly and recklessly, and without any foundation whatsoever".

The report of the Royal Commission was read in the Legislative Assembly and the contents published in Hansard, which then held, by a vote of 46 to 11, that Price was "guilty of conduct unworthy of a member of Parliament and seriously reflecting upon the honor and dignity of this House". The house then resolved, by a vote of 35 to 20, that Price be expelled from the Legislative Assembly.

Being expelled from Parliament however was not a barrier to re-election and Price re-contested the seat. The Labor Party did not nominate a candidate and the Taree Branch of the Labor Party supported Price to embarrass the government.

== Dates ==
Date	Event
13 December 1916	Richard Price made allegations about deviations on the Dubbo to Werris Creek railway line.
5 September 1917	Richard price makes further allegations concerning the purchase of saw mills, payment of salaries and purchase of land for soldiers.
20 September 1917	Judge Montgomerie Hamilton was appointed Royal Commissioner.
12 October 1917	Judge Montgomerie Hamilton published the report of the Royal Commission.
17 October 1917	Richard Price was expelled from Parliament.
19 October 1917	Writ of election issued by the Speaker of the Legislative Assembly.
27 October 1917	Nominations
10 November 1917	Polling day
24 November 1917	Return of writ

== Result ==
1917 Gloucester by-election Saturday 10 November
Party	Candidate	Votes	%	±%
Independent	Richard Price (re-elected)	3,740	59.6	+3.6
Nationalist	Lewis Martin	2,999	40.4	−3.6
Total formal votes		6,275	100.0	+0.3
Informal votes		0	0.0	−0.3
Turnout		6,275	62.7 (Note: Estimate based on a roll of 10,015 at the 1917 election.)	−5.6
Independent hold		Swing	+3.6	

== See also ==
- Electoral results for the district of Gloucester
- List of New South Wales state by-elections
