= 1965 Oxley state by-election =

Election result for Oxley, New South Wales, Australia

A by-election was held for the New South Wales Legislative Assembly electorate of Oxley on 6 May 1965 following the death of Les Jordan (Liberal).

== Dates ==
Date	Event
29 September 1965	Death of Les Jordan.
19 October 1965	Writ of election issued by the Speaker of the Legislative Assembly.
22 October 1965	Day of nomination
6 November 1965	Polling day
7 December 1965	Return of writ

== Results ==
1965 Oxley by-election]] Saturday 6 November
Party	Candidate	Votes	%	±%
Country	Bruce Cowan	6,286	32.9	+32.9
Labor	Joseph Andrews	7,059	37.0	+0.9
Liberal	Alfred Dennis	5,047	26.5	
Independent	John Martin	584	3.1	
Independent	Joe Cordner	106	0.6	
Total formal votes		19,082	97.9	−0.9
Informal votes		410	2.1	+0.9
Turnout		19,492	90.7	−3.5
Two-party-preferred result
Country	Bruce Cowan	11,402	59.8	
Labor	Joseph Andrews	7,680	40.3	
Country gain from Liberal		Swing	N/A	

== See also ==
- Electoral results for the district of Oxley
- List of New South Wales state by-elections
