= 1934 Gloucester state by-election =

Election result for Gloucester, New South Wales, Australia

A by-election was held for the New South Wales Legislative Assembly electorate of Gloucester on 25 August 1934 because of the death of Walter Bennett, (United Australia).

Walter Bennett's son Charles was selected as the United Australia candidate.

== Dates ==
Date	Event
16 July 1934	Walter Bennett died.
1 August 1934	Writ of election issued by the Speaker of the Legislative Assembly.
8 August 1934	Day of nomination
25 August 1934	Polling day
12 September 1934	Return of writ

== Result ==
1934 Gloucester by-election Saturday 25 August
Party	Candidate	Votes	%	±%
United Australia	Charles Bennett	6,868	53.2	+2.6
Country	George Waller	3,531	27.4	+27.4
Country	William Hawdon	2,506	19.4	−10.6
Total formal votes		12,905	97.2	−1.1
Informal votes		374	2.8	+1.1
Turnout		13,279	89.9	−6.3
United Australia hold		Swing	N/A	

- Preferences were not distributed.

== See also ==
- Electoral results for the district of Gloucester
- List of New South Wales state by-elections
