= 1985 Gloucester state by-election =

Election result for Gloucester, New South Wales, Australia

A by-election for the seat of Gloucester in the New South Wales Legislative Assembly was held on 12 October 1985. The by-election was triggered by the resignation of National MP Leon Punch.

== Dates ==
Date	Event
2 July 1985	Leon Punch resigned.
12 September 1985	Writ of election issued by the Speaker of the Legislative Assembly and close of electoral rolls.
19 September 1985	Close of nominations
12 October 2016	Polling day, between the hours of 8 am and 6 pm
1 November 1985	Return of writ

== Result ==
1985 Gloucester by-election Saturday 1 February
Party	Candidate	Votes	%	±%
National	Wendy Machin	21,461	68.32	
Independent	Rodney Hickman	7,096	22.59	
Nuclear Disarmament	Marie-Anne Hockings	2,589	8.24	
Small Business and Enterprise Party	Kusala Fitzroy-Mendis	161	0.51	
Small Business and Enterprise Party	Stanley Fitzroy-Mendis	104	0.33	
Total formal votes		31,411	97.62	
Informal votes		765	2.38	
Turnout		32,176	81.02	
National hold		Swing		

== See also ==
- Electoral results for the district of Gloucester
- List of New South Wales state by-elections
