= Electoral district of Oxley =

State electoral district of New South Wales, Australia

Oxley New South Wales—Legislative Assembly
- Interactive map of district boundaries from the 2023 state election
- State: New South Wales
- Dates current: 1920–1988; 1991–present
- MP: Michael Kemp
- Party: National Party
- Namesake: John Oxley
- Electors: 62,816 (2023)
- Area: 9,239.31 km^{2} (3,567.3 sq mi)
- Demographic: Rural
Electorates around Oxley:
Northern Tablelands	Clarence	Coffs Harbour
Maitland	Oxley	Port Macquarie
Myall Lakes	Port Macquarie	Pacific Ocean

Oxley is an electoral district of the Legislative Assembly in the Australian state of New South Wales.

While the Mid North Coast has throughout history been conservative, Oxley is seen as particularly conservative even by Mid North Coast standards. As a single-member seat, Oxley has only ever been held by a conservative party. It is a very safe Nationals seat.

== History ==
Oxley was created in 1920, with the introduction of proportional representation, replacing Gloucester and Raleigh, and elected three members. It was named after John Oxley. In 1927 it was divided into the single-member electorates of Oxley, Gloucester and Raleigh. In 1988 it was abolished and replaced by Port Macquarie. It was recreated in 1991.

Oxley is one of three original (post 1927 redistribution) electorates to have never been held by the Labor Party, the other districts being Tamworth and Upper Hunter. The National Party has held the seat since its current incarnation was created in 1991.

At the 2007 election it included most of Bellingen Shire (including Bellingen and Dorrigo), Nambucca Shire (including Nambucca Heads, Macksville and Bowraville), Kempsey Shire, some of inland Port Macquarie-Hastings Council, including Wauchope, the lightly inhabited northwest of the Mid-Coast Council, and the lightly inhabited eastern fringe of Walcha Shire and Armidale Regional Council.

The next redistribution taking effect at the 2015 state election redrew Oxley to contain the entirety of Bellingen Shire, Nambucca Shire, Kempsey Shire and a large inland component of Port Macquarie-Hastings Council. Its significant population centres include Bellingen, Nambucca Heads, Macksville, Kempsey and Wauchope.

== Members for Oxley ==
=== First incarnation 1920-1988 ===
Three members (1920–1927)
Member	Party	Term	Member	Party	Term	Member	Party	Term
George Briner	Progressive	1920–1920	Joseph Fitzgerald	Labor	1920–1927	Richard Price	Progressive	1920–1922
Theodore Hill	Progressive	1920–1922	Joseph Fitzgerald	Labor	1920–1927	Richard Price	Progressive	1920–1922
Theodore Hill	Nationalist	1922–1927	Joseph Fitzgerald	Labor	1920–1927	Roy Vincent	Progressive	1922–1927

Single-member (1927–1988)
Member	Party	Term
Lewis Martin	Nationalist	1927–1932
Lewis Martin	United Australia	1932–1941
George Mitchell	Independent	1941–1944
Les Jordan	Country	1944–1959
Les Jordan	Liberal	1959–1965
Bruce Cowan	Country	1965–1980
Peter King	National	1981–1981
Jim Brown	National	1981–1984
Bruce Jeffery	National	1984–1988
Single-member (1991–present)
Member	Party	Term
Bruce Jeffery	National	1991–1999
Andrew Stoner	National	1999–2015
Melinda Pavey	National	2015–2023
Michael Kemp	National	2023–present

== Election results ==
2023 New South Wales state election: Oxley
Party	Candidate	Votes	%	±%
National	Michael Kemp	24,987	47.5	−4.9
Labor	Gregory Vigors	9,899	18.8	−1.5
Greens	Dominic King	7,420	14.1	+1.6
Legalise Cannabis	Megan Mathew	4,708	8.9	+8.9
Independent	Joshua Fairhall	2,878	5.5	+5.5
Sustainable Australia	Bianca Drain	1,400	2.7	−1.0
Independent	Troy Irwin	1,316	2.5	+2.5
Total formal votes		52,608	96.5	+0.1
Informal votes		1,880	3.5	−0.1
Turnout		54,488	86.7	−1.7
Two-party-preferred result
National	Michael Kemp	27,132	62.8	−2.6
Labor	Gregory Vigors	16,047	37.2	+2.6
National hold		Swing	−2.6	
