= Peter Maurice King =

Australian politician (1940–2018)

Peter Maurice King (18 January 1940 – 24 September 2018) was an Australian politician. He was a National Country Party member of the New South Wales Legislative Assembly from February to August 1981, representing the electorate of Oxley.

King won preselection to contest the safe Country Party seat of Oxley upon the resignation of long-time MLA Bruce Cowan, who had resigned to contest a seat at the 1980 federal election. He was easily elected, but his career was to be short-lived. The electoral redistribution for the 1981 state election abolished the nearby electorate of Raleigh, and its Country Party MLA, Jim Brown, chose to challenge King for Oxley preselection rather than contest the new electorate of Coffs Harbour. Brown emerged successful after a controversial preselection campaign, and King was forced to retire at the 1981 election.

King was married, and had children. He died at Emmaus, Port Macquarie on 24 September 2018.

New South Wales Legislative Assembly
Preceded by Bruce Cowan	Member for Oxley; 1981	Succeeded by Jim Brown
