= John Shadrach Hart =

Australian politician

John Shadrach Hart (30 October 1838 – 21 February 1912) was an Australian politician.

He was born in Sydney to John and Sarah Hart, and attended Cape's School and then Savigny's Collegiate School in Newcastle. He became a farmer, first at Port Stephens and then in the Barwon and Namoi regions. He was subsequently a publican and timber merchant at Raymond Terrace, where he was an alderman and the inaugural mayor. Around 1869 he married Eliza Ellen Sullivan, with whom he had seven children. In 1891 he was elected to the New South Wales Legislative Assembly as the Free Trade member for Gloucester, serving until his defeat in 1894. He lived in Marrickville from around 1903, and it was there that he died in 1912.

New South Wales Legislative Assembly
Preceded by Jonathan Seaver	Member for Gloucester; 1891–1894	Succeeded by Richard Price
