= George Mitchell (Australian politician) =

Australian politician

Major George Mitchell MC, DCM

Member of the New South Wales Legislative Assembly for Oxley
- In office 10 May 1941 – 24 April 1944
- Preceded by: Lewis Martin
- Succeeded by: Les Jordan

Personal details
- Born: 30 August 1894 Caltowie, South Australia
- Died: 11 January 1961 (aged 66) Sydney, New South Wales
- Party: Independent

Military service
- Allegiance: Australia
- Branch/service: Australian Imperial Force; Citizen Military Forces; Second Australian Imperial Force
- Years of service: 1914–1919; 1920–1926; 1940–1946
- Rank: Major
- Unit: 10th Battalion (1914–16); 48th Battalion (1916–19)
- Commands: 43rd Landing Craft Company
- Battles/wars: First World War; Gallipoli campaign; Landing at Anzac Cove; Western Front; First attack on Bullecourt; First Battle of Dernancourt; Second World War; New Guinea campaign
- Awards: Military Cross; Distinguished Conduct Medal

George Deane Mitchell, MC, DCM (30 August 1894 – 11 January 1961) was an Australian politician and an Independent member of the New South Wales Legislative Assembly for a single term between 1941 and 1944.

== Early life ==
Mitchell was born in Caltowie near Jamestown, South Australia, and was the son of a railway porter. He was educated in Adelaide and worked as a clerk in Therbarton until 1914. Mitchell enlisted in the Australian Imperial Force at the outbreak of the First World War and served in the Middle East and France between 1914 and 1919. He reached the rank of lieutenant and was awarded the Military Cross and Distinguished Conduct Medal. In the inter-war period Mitchell was a member of the Citizen Military Forces and re-enlisted in the Second Australian Imperial Force with the rank of captain at the commencement of the Second World War. He reached the rank of major and commanded an amphibious landing force in the New Guinea campaign. Mitchell had several other occupations including potato farming in Dorrigo, owning a motor garage and car sales agency, and script writing for the Australian film industry. He was an office holder in the Returned Sailors’ and Soldiers’ Imperial League of Australia.

== State Parliament ==
Mitchell unsuccessfully contested the seat of Oxley as an Independent candidate at the 1938 state election. He was easily defeated by the United Australia Party incumbent member and Minister for Local Government and Public Works, Lewis Martin. Mitchell reversed the result with a surprise victory in the landslide defeat of Alexander Mair's conservative coalition government at the 1941 election. Mitchell was on extended leave from parliament due to active war service during much of the period following the election. The parliamentary convention was that members on active service were not opposed by candidates from major parties during elections. However, Les Jordan, a member of the Country Party and two other party members stood as "Independent Country" candidates. Jordan was victorious, and immediately joined the Country Party caucus. Mitchell then retired from public life.

New South Wales Legislative Assembly
Preceded by Lewis Martin	Member for Oxley; 1941–1944	Succeeded by Les Jordan
