= Joseph John Fitzgerald =

Australian politician (1883–1973)

Joseph John Fitzgerald (12 February 1883 – 5 July 1973) was an Australian politician.

He was born at Nelligen to shoemaker Robert Fitzgerald and Bridget, née Gilligan. He helped on his father's hand ferry across the Clyde River and worked on the railways before leasing land near Batemans Bay. After moving to Sydney he became a nurse at Callan Park Asylum. Around 1906 he married Emma Hillier, with whom he had a daughter. He was involved in the foundation of the Hospital Employees' Union in 1911 and was its first secretary, serving until 1913; he then became involved in the Timber Workers' Union (secretary 1916–20, president 1920–28). In 1920 he was elected to the New South Wales Legislative Assembly as a Labor member for Oxley. He served as Assistant Minister for Public Health and Local Government from 1925 to 1926 and Minister for Local Government from 1926 to 1927. Defeated in 1927, he served a single term as member for Albury from 1930 to 1932. He re-emerged on the political scene in the 1960s, serving from 1960 to 1967 on Marrickville Council, with the position of Mayor from 1960 to 1962 and Deputy Mayor from 1963 to 1967. Fitzgerald died at Lewisham in 1973.

New South Wales Legislative Assembly
| Preceded by New seat | Member for Oxley; 1920–1927; Served alongside: Briner/Hill, Price/Vincent | Succeeded by Lewis Martin |
| Preceded by John Ross | Member for Albury; 1930–1932 | Succeeded by Alexander Mair |
