= Jonathan Seaver =

Australian politician, engineer and surveyor

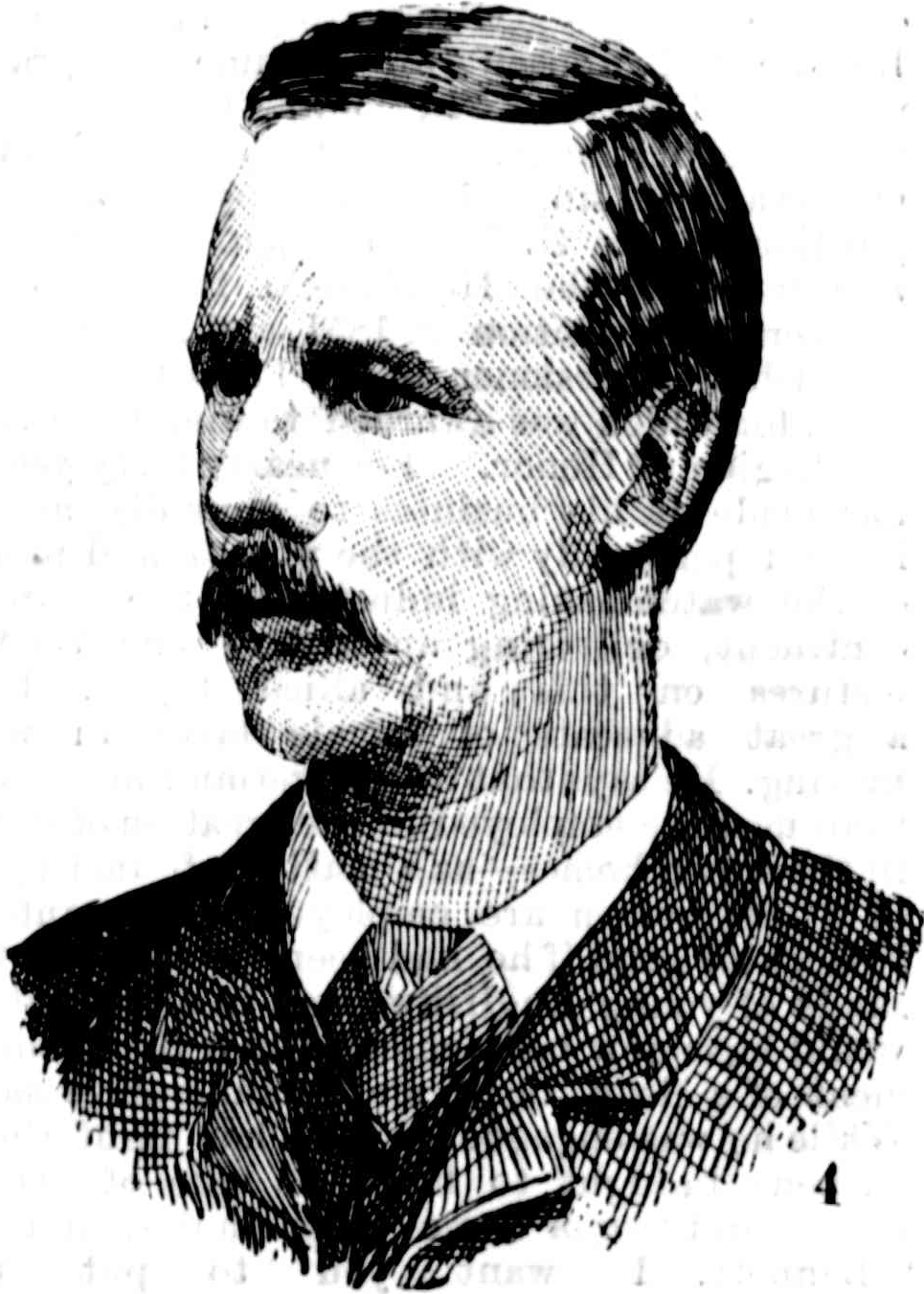
Mr Jonathan Seaver MLA for Gloucester

Jonathan Charles Billing Pockerage Seaver (born 7 June 1855, date of death unknown) was an Irish-born Australian politician, engineer and surveyor.

He was born at Kingstown near Dublin, the eldest son of Thomas Seaver and arrived in Victoria around 1857. At sixteen he became a tutor and after an abortive attempt at a church career worked as an engineer and surveyor. He traveled widely, spending some time in Adelaide, where he married Mary Robinson née Abbott on 22 November 1880, before settling in Gloucester. In 1887 he was elected to the New South Wales Legislative Assembly as the Free Trade member for Gloucester and retained the seat in 1889. In May 1891 four free traders, Seaver, George Reid, Jack Want and John Haynes, voted against the fifth Parkes Ministry in a motion of no confidence, which was only defeated by the casting vote of the Speaker. Whilst the government survived the motion, parliament was dissolved on 6 June 1891. Such was Seaver's animosity to Sir Henry Parkes, he did not contest Gloucester, but instead contested St Leonards, stating that his sole reason was opposing Parkes. His opposition was ineffective however as Parkes topped the poll, while Seaver finished a distant last.

Seaver left Sydney with his family on the R.M.S. Australia in August 1896 bound for London. Little is known about his subsequent life. It is possible that he died in Mexico in 1928 however this is not confirmed by a reliable source.

New South Wales Legislative Assembly
Preceded by Robert White	Member for Gloucester; 1887–1891	Succeeded by John Hart
