= Bruce Jeffery =

Australian politician

Bruce Leslie Jeffery (born 25 June 1944) is a former Australian politician. He was a National Party member of the New South Wales Legislative Assembly, representing Oxley from 1984 to 1988, Port Macquarie from 1988 to 1991, and Oxley again from 1991 to 1999.

Jeffery was born in Shepparton, Victoria, to parents Reginald and Mona. He attended local state schools and in 1961 the family moved to Finley in New South Wales. After graduating in 1961 he worked with the Australia and New Zealand Banking Group until 1965, when he took up farming. On 6 January 1968 he married Margaret, with whom he had four children. He was secretary of the Rural Lands Protection Board in Jerilderie from 1972 to 1978 and at Kempsey from 1979 to 1984. He was also a Justice of the Peace, and had joined the Country Party in 1968. Jeffery twice stood unsuccessfully for the state seat of Murray in 1973.

In 1984, the National member for the local state seat of Oxley, Jim Brown, retired and Jeffery was selected as the new Nationals candidate. He held the seat without difficulty, but it was abolished in 1988 and he was elected to represent the new seat of Port Macquarie. When Oxley was recreated in 1991, Jeffery returned to his old seat, while Port Macquarie was taken by Manning MP Wendy Machin, whose seat had been abolished. Jeffery was Nationals Whip 1992–99 and held several committee positions, but never rose to the front bench. He retired in 1999.

New South Wales Legislative Assembly
Preceded by Jim Brown	Member for Oxley; 1984–1988	Succeeded by Abolished
Preceded by New seat	Member for Port Macquarie; 1988–1991	Succeeded by Wendy Machin
Preceded by New seat	Member for Oxley; 1991–1999	Succeeded by Andrew Stoner
