= George Briner =

Australian politician (1862–1920)

George Stuart Briner (5 April 1862 – 9 September 1920) was an Australian politician.

He was born in Morses Creek in Victoria to miner William Torents Briner and Mary Ann, née Whyatt. After attending Scotch College and the University of Melbourne, he worked as a teacher, and arrived in New South Wales in 1881, where he taught until 1891. In that year, he began work as a journalist for the Goulburn Evening Penny Post before moving to Bellingen and editing the Raleigh Sun (1894–98). In 1901 he was elected to the New South Wales Legislative Assembly as the member for Raleigh, representing the Progressive Party. Following that party's collapse in 1907 he was one of the few members re-elected as a "Former Progressive", and he spent the next ten years sitting as an independent before joining the Nationalist Party in 1917. In 1920 he was elected as one of the members for Oxley representing the new Progressive Party, a forerunner of the Country Party, but he died at Lewisham later that year. He had married Annie Mary Taylor in 1905.

New South Wales Legislative Assembly
Preceded by John McLaughlin	Member for Raleigh; 1901–1920	Abolished
New seat	Member for Oxley; 1920; Served alongside: Fitzgerald, Price	Succeeded by Theodore Hill
