= Theodore Hill (Australian politician) =

Australian politician

Theodore Hooke Hill (1855 – 8 November 1942) was an Australian politician.

He was born at Dungog to grazier George Snell Hill and Adelaide, née Hooke. He married Laetitia Elizabeth Canning. Around 1880 he joined the Bank of Australasia, managing the Rockhampton branch from around 1890 to around 1917. He supported new state movements in both Queensland and New South Wales and was active in the Rockhampton area. Having moved to New South Wales, he was elected to the New South Wales Legislative Assembly in 1920 as a Progressive member for Oxley. As a member of the coalitionist faction of the party, he had joined the Nationalists by 1925. Hill retired in 1927. He died in Sydney in 1942.

New South Wales Legislative Assembly
Preceded by George Briner	Member for Oxley; 1920–1927; Served alongside: Fitzgerald, Price/Vincent	Succeeded by Lewis Martin
