= Radford Gamack =

Australian politician

Personal details
- Born: 1 January 1897 near Telegraph Point, New South Wales
- Died: 1 January 1979 (aged 82)
- Party: Country Party

Radford Baird Gamack (1897–1979) was an Australian politician and a member of the New South Wales Legislative Assembly from 1953 until 1959. He was a member of the Country Party.

Gamack was born in Rollands Plains near Telegraph Point, New South Wales and was the son of a farmer. He was educated to elementary level and became a dairy farmer. Gamack became involved in community organizations in the Kempsey area including the Ambulance Board, co-operative dairy companies, the Kempsey Show society and the Pastures Protection Board. He was elected as a Councillor on Hastings Shire Council between 1923 and 1944 and was the Shire President in 1923 and 1944. Gamack was elected to parliament as the Country Party member for Raleigh at the 1953 state election. He replaced the incumbent Country Party member Roy Vincent who had retired. Gamack was re-elected unopposed at the 1956 election but lost the Country Party endorsement to Jim Brown at the 1959 election. He unsuccessfully contested the election as an independent and retired from public life after his defeat. He did not hold party, parliamentary or ministerial office.

Civic offices
Preceded by John James Warrall	Shire President of Hastings; 1934 – 1935	Succeeded by Robert Barrie Walsh
Preceded by Charles Perrott	Shire President of Hastings; 1943 – 1944	Succeeded by Harold Rose
New South Wales Legislative Assembly
Preceded by Roy Vincent	Member for Raleigh; 1953 – 1959	Succeeded by Jim Brown
