= The Bellingen Shire Courier-Sun =

Newspaper in New South Wales, Australia

- Type: Weekly newspaper
- Owner: Australian Community Media
- Founded: 1889; 136 years ago
- Language: English
- City: Bellingen, New South Wales
- Country: Australia
- Website: www.bellingencourier.com.au

The Bellingen Shire Courier-Sun is a weekly newspaper published in Bellingen, New South Wales, Australia by Australian Community Media. It has been published under a variety of titles since 1889, including The Northern Courier, The Raleigh Sun, Seaboard Valley Star and The Bellinger Courier-Sun.

== History ==
The Northern Courier and County of Raleigh Advocate was first published in Fernmount on 1 September 1889 by Henry Boultwood. In March 1894 The Raleigh Sun was launched in competition to The Northern Courier by William Thomas Campbell and Thomas Giddons. Elizabeth May Campbell was proprietor for nineteen years after the death of her husband, William Thomas Campbell, in 1899. The Raleigh Sun was published in Bellingen. The Northern Courier and The Raleigh Sun merged on 12 February 1946 to become The Bellinger Courier-Sun.

In December 2000, the Courier-Sun merged with the Seaboard Valley Star and is now published as The Bellingen Shire Courier-Sun.

== Digitisation ==
The Raleigh Sun has been digitised as part of the Australian Newspapers Digitisation Program project of the National Library of Australia.

== See also ==
- List of newspapers in Australia
- List of newspapers in New South Wales
