= Michael Kemp =

Australian politician

Michael Kemp MP

Member of the New South Wales Assembly for Oxley
- Incumbent
- Assumed office 25 March 2023
- Preceded by: Melinda Pavey

Personal details
- Born: Kempsey, New South Wales, Australia
- Party: National Party

Michael Peter Kemp is an Australian politician. He was elected a member of the New South Wales Legislative Assembly representing Oxley for the National Party in 2023.

== Military career ==
Kemp completed three tours of duty with the Royal Australian Air Force.

== Medical career ==
Kemp is the director and principal physiotherapist at Keystone Health.

== Political career ==
Kemp won preselection in October 2022. In the 2023 New South Wales state election, he succeeded Melinda Pavey as the member for Oxley.
