= Roy Vincent =

Australian politician

The Honourable Roy Vincent

Secretary for Mines and Minister for Forests
- In office 18 June 1932 – 16 May 1941
- Preceded by: Frank Chaffey
- Succeeded by: Jack Baddeley

Personal details
- Born: 6 February 1892 near Glen Innes, New South Wales
- Died: 5 June 1965 (aged 73) Sydney
- Party: Progressive Party Country Party

Roy Stanley Vincent (6 February 1892 – 5 June 1965) was an Australian politician and a member of the New South Wales Legislative Assembly from 1922 until 1953. He was a member of the "True Blue" faction of the Progressive Party until it became the Country Party in 1927. He was the party's Deputy Leader and Whip between 1950 and 1953. He held ministerial rank as the Secretary of Mines and Minister for Forests between 1932 and 1941.

== Early life ==
Vincent was born at Glen Innes, New South Wales and was the son of a newspaper editor. He was educated at Uralla and became a newspaper reporter but eventually edited and owned the Don Dorrigo Gazette in Dorrigo. He became active in community organizations including the New England New State Movement of Earle Page, the Returned and Services League of Australia and the Aboriginal Protection Board. Vincent served in the First Australian Imperial Force during World War One and was severely wounded and gassed in France.

== State Parliament ==
Vincent was elected to the parliament as a Progressive Party member for in the multi-member seat of Oxley at the 1922 election. He defeated the sitting member and his Progressive Party colleague Richard Price. He moved to the seat of Raleigh as a member of the Country Party when New South Wales reverted to single member electorates at the 1927 election. He retained this seat for the next eight elections and retired at the 1953 election.

== Government ==
The state election of 1932 saw the landslide defeat of Labor and the formation of a conservative coalition government by Bertram Stevens. Vincent was the Secretary for Mines and Minister for Forests throughout the premiership of Stevens and his successor Alexander Mair whose government was defeated at the 1941 election.

New South Wales Legislative Assembly
Preceded by Richard Price	Member for Oxley (multi-member); 1922 – 1927; With: Joseph Fitzgerald; Theodore Hill	Succeeded by Lewis Martin reverted to single member seat
Preceded by Restored seat	Member for Raleigh; 1927 – 1953	Succeeded by Radford Gamack
Political offices
Preceded by Frank Chaffey	Secretary for Mines and Minister for Forests; 1932 – 1941	Succeeded by Jack Baddeley
