= Ray Fitzgerald (politician) =

Australian politician

Raymond Leo Fitzgerald (27 July 1879 – 18 December 1963) was an Australian politician. He was a member of the New South Wales Legislative Assembly from 1941 until 1962 and served as an independent member until 1950 and then as a member of the Country Party.

Fitzgerald was born in Dungog, New South Wales. He was the son of a dairy farmer and was educated to elementary level at Dungog Public School. He initially worked on his father's farm but eventually owned substantial dairy farms in the Hunter Region. He was an official with local dairy farmers' organizations and was a councillor on Dungog Shire council from 1901 to 1942. He was the mayor on several occasions. After one unsuccessful attempt, Fitzgerald was elected to the New South Wales Parliament at the 1941 as the Independent member for Gloucester. He defeated the United Australia Party sitting member Charles Bennett. Fitzgerald retained the seat at the next 6 elections and retired at the 1962 election. He joined the caucus of the Country Party prior to the 1950 election. He did not hold party, parliamentary or ministerial office.

In 1965, the Fitzgerald Bridge from Raymond Terrace to Nelsons Plains was named after Fitzgerald.

New South Wales Legislative Assembly
Preceded by Charles Bennett	Member for Gloucester; 1941 – 1962	Succeeded by Leon Punch
