= Les Jordan =

Australian politician

Personal details
- Born: 26 July 1896 Sydney
- Died: 29 September 1965 (aged 69) Ryde, Sydney
- Party: Country Party, Liberal Party

Leslie Charles Jordan (26 July 1896 – 29 September 1965) was an Australian politician and a member of the New South Wales Legislative Assembly from 1944 until his death in 1965 . He was initially elected as a member of the Country Party but changed allegiance to the Liberal Party in 1959.

Jordan was born in Sydney and was the son of a brick-maker. He was educated at state schools and initially worked as a dairy farm assistant before becoming a real estate agent. When he was in his 30s, Jordan studied law at the University of Sydney and was called to the NSW bar in 1936. Jordan was an alderman on Ryde Municipal Council between 1935 and 1937 and a councillor on Manning Shire Council between 1951 and 1956. He was shire president during those years. Despite his urban background, he made unsuccessful attempts to win the seat of Raleigh at the 1938 and 1941 state elections. He was eventually elected to the New South Wales Parliament as the "Independent Country" member for Oxley at the 1944 state election. He defeated the sitting Independent member, George Mitchell who was on active overseas war service at the time of the election. He joined the Country party caucus after his election and retained the seat for the party at the next 5 elections. After the 1959 election he changed his party allegiance to the Liberal Party and retained the seat until he died in 1965. He did not hold party, parliamentary or ministerial office.

New South Wales Legislative Assembly
Preceded by George Mitchell	Member for Oxley; 1944–1965	Succeeded by Bruce Cowan
