= Charles Bennett (Australian politician) =

Australian politician

Charles Edward Bennett MBE (5 March 1894 – 3 September 1968) was an Australian politician.

He was born at Dungog, the son of Walter Bennett. He attended a convent school, Durham College at Dungog and then Fort Street Model School in Sydney before studying for a Bachelor of Arts at the University of Sydney until 1916. He succeeded his father as editor of the Dungog Chronicle in 1917, a position he would hold until 1958, and was also the Dungog correspondent for the Newcastle Morning Herald. On 1 February 1921 he married Zara Mulvogue, with whom he had three children. From 1930 to 1963 he was chairman of the Dungog Hospital Board, and he served as secretary of the Australian Racing Association from 1922 to 1932.

In 1934, Bennett was elected to the New South Wales Legislative Assembly as the United Australia Party member for Gloucester, succeeding his father. He served until 1941, when he was defeated by Ray Fitzgerald, an independent candidate. He was appointed a Member of the Order of the British Empire in 1966. Bennett died at Dungog in 1968.

New South Wales Legislative Assembly
Preceded by Walter Bennett	Member for Gloucester; 1934–1941	Succeeded by Ray Fitzgerald
