= Richard Price (New South Wales politician) =

Australian politician

Richard Atkinson Price (1864 – 22 June 1936) was an Irish-born Australian politician.

He was born in Dublin and arrived in New South Wales around 1879. He and his brother established a wool importation and tailoring firm and became prominent businessman. From 1887 to 1893 he was a Rockdale alderman. In 1894 he was elected to the New South Wales Legislative Assembly as a Protectionist member for Gloucester. In 1901, when the Protectionists became the Progressive Party, Price instead became an independent, winning re-election as such that year. He was defeated in an attempt to transfer to Durham in 1904 but returned in 1907, once more as the member for Gloucester. He eventually joined the Liberal Party before the 1910 election and received endorsement from the Farmers' and Settlers' Association of New South Wales in 1913, but he was an independent again by 1917. On 18 October 1917 he was expelled from the Assembly after a Royal Commission found that allegations he had made against Lands Minister William Ashford were wanton and reckless. Despite this he was re-elected at the subsequent by-election. In 1920, with the introduction of proportional representation, he was elected as a member for Oxley, representing the Progressive Party, forerunner of the Country Party. He was one of the "True Blues" in the Progressive split of 1921 and lost his seat in 1922.

New South Wales Legislative Assembly
Preceded by John Hart	Member for Gloucester; 1894–1904	Succeeded by James Young
Preceded by James Young	Member for Gloucester; 1907–1920	Abolished
New seat	Member for Oxley; 1920–1922; Served alongside: George Briner/Theodore Hill, Joseph Fitzgerald	Succeeded by Roy Vincent
