= Lewis Martin (Australian politician) =

Australian politician

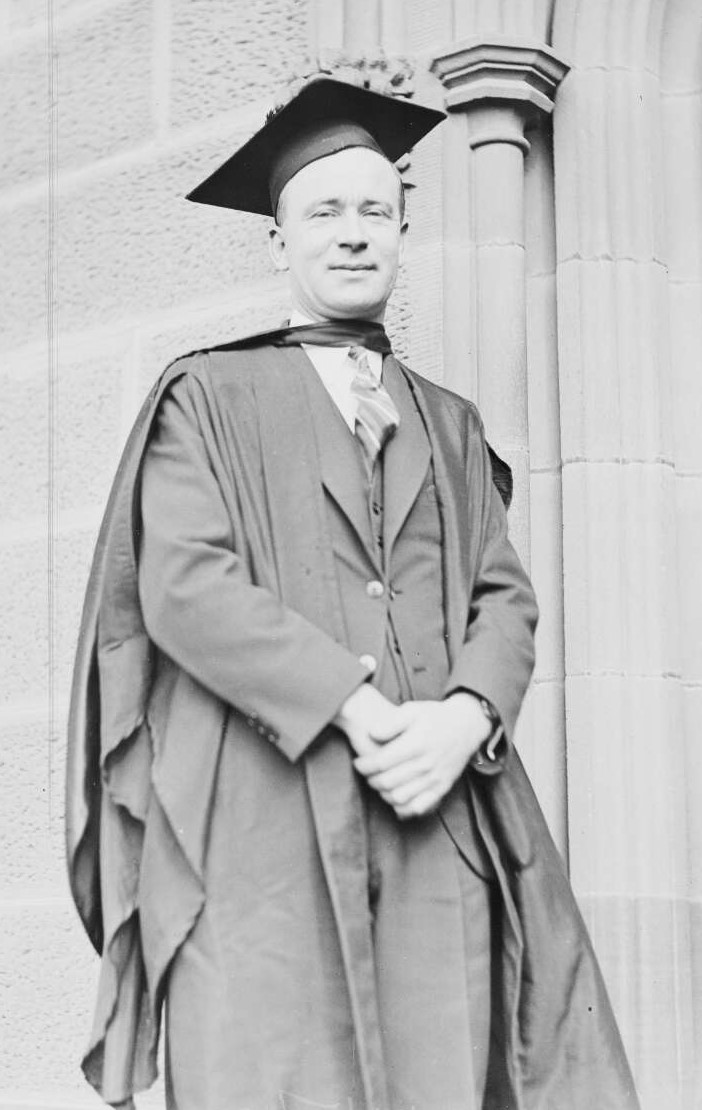

Lewis Ormsby Martin (16 May 1870 – 17 April 1944) was an Australian politician who was a Member for Oxley from 1927 to 1941, Member of the NSW Legislative Assembly from 1927 to 1941, Secretary for Public Works and Minister for Local Government from 1932 to 1939 and Minister for Justice from 1932 to 1939.

== Life ==
He was born on 16 May 1870 in Bairnsdale, Victoria, to miner Robert Martin and his wife Antoinette Louisa. While Lewis was still young the family moved to New South Wales. Here he was educated privately by a tutor, W. Compton. He was articled a solicitor's clerk in 1889, and studied at the University of Sydney, receiving a Bachelor of Arts in 1893 and a Bachelor of Law in 1895, the year he was admitted as a solicitor. He settled in Taree, where he accumulated several properties. In 1900 he married Lucy Danvers, with whom he had eight children. He died at Taree on 17 April 1944.

== Career ==
He served on Taree Council from 1906 to 1928, with periods as mayor from 1911 to 1913. A member of the Farmers' and Settlers' Association of New South Wales, he moved politically from the Liberal Party to the Progressive Party before being elected as a Nationalist member of the New South Wales Legislative Assembly in 1927, representing Oxley. He was Secretary for Public Works, Minister for Local Government and Minister for Justice from 1932 to 1939. Martin was defeated by an independent candidate in 1941.

New South Wales Legislative Assembly
Preceded by Joseph Fitzgerald; Theodore Hill; Roy Vincent	Member for Oxley; 1927–1941	Succeeded by George Mitchell
Political offices
Preceded by Alexander Mair	Secretary for Public Works; 1939 – 1941	Succeeded by Joseph Cahill
