= Electoral district of Gloucester =

Former state electoral district of New South Wales, Australia

Coordinates: 32°00′34″S 151°57′37″E

Gloucester was an electoral district of the Legislative Assembly in the Australian state of New South Wales, originally created in 1880, partly replacing Williams, and named after Gloucester (which it included) or Gloucester County (which it overlapped). In 1920, with the introduction of proportional representation, it was absorbed into Oxley, along with Raleigh. It was recreated in 1927, and abolished in 1988 and replaced by Myall Lakes and Port Stephens.

== Members for Gloucester ==
First incarnation (1880–1920)
Member	Party	Term
Archibald Jacob	None	1880–1882
Robert White	None	1882–1887
Jonathan Seaver	Free Trade	1887–1891
John Hart	Free Trade	1891–1894
Richard Price	Protectionist	189–1901
Richard Price	Independent	1901–1904
James Young	Liberal Reform	1904–1907
Richard Price	Liberal Reform	1907–1917
Richard Price	Independent	1917–1920
Second incarnation (1927–1988)
Member	Party	Term
Walter Bennett	Nationalist	1927–1931
Walter Bennett	United Australia	1931–1934
Charles Bennett	United Australia	1934–1941
Ray Fitzgerald	Independent	1941–1950
Ray Fitzgerald	Country	1950–1962
Leon Punch	Country, National	1962–1985
Wendy Machin	National	1985–1988

== Election results ==
1985 Gloucester by-election Saturday 1 February
Party	Candidate	Votes	%	±%
National	Wendy Machin	21,461	68.32	
Independent	Rodney Hickman	7,096	22.59	
Nuclear Disarmament	Marie-Anne Hockings	2,589	8.24	
Small Business and Enterprise Party	Kusala Fitzroy-Mendis	161	0.51	
Small Business and Enterprise Party	Stanley Fitzroy-Mendis	104	0.33	
Total formal votes		31,411	97.62	
Informal votes		765	2.38	
Turnout		32,176	81.02	
National hold		Swing		

National MP Leon Punch resigned.
