= Jim Brown (New South Wales politician) =

Australian politician

James Hill Brown OAM (19 March 1918 – 17 January 1999) was an Australian politician, elected as a member of the New South Wales Legislative Assembly.

Brown was born in Cessnock and educated at Cessnock Public School and Maitland Boys High School. He became an insurance executive.

Brown was elected as the Country Party member for Raleigh in 1959 and held it to Raleigh's abolition in 1981, when he became the member for Oxley until his retirement in 1984.

In the 1995 Australia Day Honours Brown's "service to the community and to the NSW Parliament" was recognised by the award of Medal of the Order of Australia.

Brown died in Coffs Harbour.

New South Wales Legislative Assembly
Preceded by Radford Gamack	Member for Raleigh; 1959 – 1981	Succeeded by Abolished
Preceded by Peter King	Member for Oxley; 1981 – 1984	Succeeded by Bruce Jeffery
