= Bruce Cowan =

Australian politician (1926–2011)

The Honourable Bruce Cowan AM

Minister for Agriculture
- In office 17 December 1975 – 14 May 1976
- Premier: Tom Lewis; Sir Eric Willis
- Preceded by: Geoff Crawford
- Succeeded by: Don Day

Member of the New South Wales Parliament for Oxley
- In office 6 November 1965 – 29 August 1980
- Preceded by: Les Jordan
- Succeeded by: Peter King

Member of the Australian Parliament for Lyne
- In office 18 October 1980 – 8 February 1993
- Preceded by: Philip Lucock
- Succeeded by: Mark Vaile

Personal details
- Born: 15 January 1926 Taree, New South Wales
- Died: 7 April 2011 (aged 85) Taree, New South Wales
- Party: National Party of Australia
- Occupation: Farmer

David Bruce Cowan AM (15 January 1926 – 7 April 2011) was an Australian politician and Minister of the Crown in the cabinets of Tom Lewis and Sir Eric Willis. He was a member of the New South Wales Legislative Assembly for 14 years from 6 November 1965 until his resignation on 29 August 1980 and then for 13 years in the Australian House of Representatives for Lyne for the Country Party of Australia and its successors, the National Country and then National Parties.

== Early life ==
Bruce Cowan was born in January 1926 in Taree, New South Wales, the son of a farmer, David Cowan, and Bessie Kent. He was educated at Oxley Island Public School and Taree High School and thereafter worked as a farmer, a real estate agent, and stock and station agent.

He became a prominent member of the community, becoming the country real estate agents representative on the New South Wales Council of Auctioneers, the President of Oxley Island Primary Producers Union Branch, Secretary of Oxley Island Drainage Union and as a Member of the Taree Rotary Club for 37 years. He married Laura Bidner on 5 June 1954 and had two daughters, one of whom, Rosemary, married the future Leader of the New South Wales Liberal Party and Premier of New South Wales, Barry O'Farrell. After Laura died in a car accident in 1987 he remarried, to Jan Churchill.

== Political career ==
Cowan's interest in politics began when he joined the Country Party of Australia, becoming a member of the central executive in 1952, 1953 and 1958. He ran for the local government elections and became an Alderman on Taree Municipal Council from 1957 to 1965, later rising to become Deputy Mayor from 1959 to 1965.

In 1965, he contested the New South Wales Legislative Assembly seat of Oxley at a November by-election caused by the death of the sitting member, Les Jordan. He went on to win the seat on preferences with 59.75% of the vote. He went on to retain his seat a further 5 times, each time with a significant majority, until his resignation. For most of his time in Parliament he remained on the backbenches until Premier Askin retired and Tom Lewis became Premier, who appointed him as Minister for Agriculture and Minister for Water Resources on 17 December 1975. He held these portfolios until, Lewis' successor, Sir Eric Willis, lost the election on 14 May 1976.

In opposition he was made the Shadow Minister for Conservation and Shadow Minister for Water Resources from 28 May 1976 to 2 November 1978, when under the new leader, John Mason, he was appointed the Shadow Minister for Local Government and Shadow Minister for Roads. Held this portfolio until he resigned and later also resigned his seat on 29 August 1980.

In 1980, Cowan won the National Country Party preselection for the Australian House of Representatives seat of Lyne when Philip Lucock retired from politics. Cowan faced the Labor candidate and Local Councillor Leslie Brown and the Liberal Party's Milton Morris who was the Member for Maitland in the NSW Legislative Assembly. Although Brown won more primary votes, preferences from Morris were more than enough to ensure that Cowan was elected. Cowan held the seat comfortably until retiring at the 1993 election.

On 26 January 1998, Cowan was appointed a Member of the Order of Australia for service to Parliament and the community. On 1 January 2001, he was also awarded the Centenary Medal for service to society through parliament.

Cowan died on 7 April 2011, a week after O'Farrell (his son-in-law) was elected Premier of New South Wales.

New South Wales Legislative Assembly
Preceded by Les Jordan	Member for Oxley; 1965–1980	Succeeded by Peter King
Political offices
Preceded by Geoff Crawford	Minister for Agriculture; 1975–1976	Succeeded by Don Day
New title	Minister for Water Resources; 1975–1976	Succeeded by Lin Gordon
Parliament of Australia
Preceded by Philip Lucock	Member for Lyne; 1980–1993	Succeeded by Mark Vaile
