= Electoral district of Raleigh =

Former state electoral district of New South Wales, Australia

Raleigh was an electoral district of the Legislative Assembly in the Australian state of New South Wales, originally created in 1894, partly replacing Macleay, and named after Raleigh County. In 1920, with the introduction of proportional representation, it was absorbed into Oxley, along with Gloucester. It was recreated in 1927 and abolished in 1981 and partly replaced by Coffs Harbour.

== Members for Raleigh ==
First incarnation (1894–1920)
| Member | Party | Term |
|---|---|---|
| Patrick Hogan | Protectionist | 1894–1895 |
| John McLaughlin | Independent | 1895–1901 |
| George Briner | Progressive | 1901–1907 |
| George Briner | Independent Liberal | 1907–1913 |
| George Briner | Country Party Association | 1913–1917 |
| George Briner | Nationalist | 1917–1920 |
Second incarnation (1927–1981)
| Member | Party | Term |
| Roy Vincent | Country | 1927–1953 |
| Radford Gamack | Country | 1953–1959 |
| Jim Brown | Country | 1959–1981 |

== Election results ==
1978 New South Wales state election: Raleigh
| Party | Candidate | Votes | % | ±% |
|---|---|---|---|---|
| National Country | Jim Brown | 13,584 | 55.3 | −8.0 |
| Labor | Joseph Moran | 10,975 | 44.7 | +8.0 |
| Total formal votes | | 24,559 | 98.8 | 0.0 |
| Informal votes | | 306 | 1.2 | 0.0 |
| Turnout | | 24,865 | 94.4 | −0.5 |
| National Country hold | | Swing | −8.0 | |
