= Results of the 1927 New South Wales state election =

State election for New South Wales, Australia in October 1927

New South Wales state election, 29 October 1927 Legislative Assembly << 1925–1930 >>
Enrolled voters	1,394,254 (Note: There were 1,409,493 enrolled voters, but 15,239 were enrolled in Tenterfield which was uncontested.)				
Votes cast	1,150,767		Turnout	82.54	+13.47
Informal votes	15,086		Informal	1.31	–2.06
Summary of votes by party
Party	Primary votes	%	Swing	Seats	Change
Labor	488,306	43.00	–2.99	40	–6
Nationalist	437,050	38.48	+1.41	33	+1
Country	100,963	8.89	–2.58	13	+4
Independent Labor	32,217	2.84	+2.58	2	+2
Ind. Nationalist	30,061	2.65	+2.06	2	+1
Protestant Labour	7,264	0.64	–1.47	0	–1
Independent Country	4,316	0.38	+0.38	0	±0
Independents	35,504	3.13	+1.02	0	–1 (Note: Alick Kay (Independent), a member for North Shore, resigned in 1926 and was replaced by Arthur Tonge (Labor))
Total	1,135,681			90	

The 1927 New South Wales state election was for 90 electoral districts returning 90 members and all elections were held on 8 October 1927.

This election took place after the Hare-Clark voting system was abolished and replaced with single member districts with optional preferential voting.

== Results by electoral district ==
=== Albury ===
1927 New South Wales state election: Albury
Party	Candidate	Votes	%	±%
Nationalist	John Ross	5,544	45.6	
Labor	James Hannan	4,786	39.4	
Independent Labor	Vern Goodin (defeated)	1,492	12.3	
Independent	George Daniel	263	2.2	
Independent	Charles Riley	65	0.5	
Total formal votes		12,150	98.8	
Informal votes		146	1.2	
Turnout		12,296	82.7	
Two-party-preferred result
Nationalist	John Ross	5,996	54.0	
Labor	James Hannan	5,105	46.0	
Nationalist win		(new seat)		

=== Alexandria ===
1927 New South Wales state election: Alexandria
Party	Candidate	Votes	%	±%
Labor	Bill Ratcliffe	8,370	67.6	
Nationalist	Ernest Kidd	4,018	32.4	
Total formal votes		12,388	98.8	
Informal votes		150	1.2	
Turnout		12,538	82.7	
Labor win		(new seat)		

=== Annandale ===
1927 New South Wales state election: Annandale
Party	Candidate	Votes	%	±%
Labor	Robert Stuart-Robertson	6,934	56.0	
Nationalist	Edward Hogan	5,454	44.0	
Total formal votes		12,388	99.0	
Informal votes		120	1.0	
Turnout		12,508	82.7	
Labor win		(new seat)		

=== Armidale ===
1927 New South Wales state election: Armidale
Party	Candidate	Votes	%	±%
Country	David Drummond	7,620	62.7	
Labor	Alfred McClelland (defeated)	4,539	37.3	
Total formal votes		12,159	98.9	
Informal votes		137	1.1	
Turnout		12,296	83.1	
Country win		(new seat)		

=== Ashburnham ===
1927 New South Wales state election: Ashburnham
Party	Candidate	Votes	%	±%
Nationalist	Edmund Best	7,063	58.8	
Labor	William Keast	4,954	41.2	
Total formal votes		12,017	98.4	
Informal votes		200	1.6	
Turnout		12,217	82.8	
Nationalist win		(new seat)		

=== Ashfield ===
1927 New South Wales state election: Ashfield
Party	Candidate	Votes	%	±%
Nationalist	Milton Jarvie	6,537	58.2	
Labor	Walter Sparrow	2,904	25.9	
Independent	Alexander Huie	1,787	15.9	
Total formal votes		11,228	99.2	
Informal votes		90	0.8	
Turnout		11,318	85.7	
Nationalist win		(new seat)		

=== Auburn ===
1927 New South Wales state election: Auburn
Party	Candidate	Votes	%	±%
Labor	Jack Lang	9,429	61.2	
Independent Labor	Patrick Minahan (defeated)	3,153	20.5	
Independent	Tom Cheetham	2,821	18.3	
Total formal votes		15,403	98.8	
Informal votes		190	1.2	
Turnout		15,593	84.6	
Labor win		(new seat)		

=== Balmain ===
1927 New South Wales state election: Balmain
Party	Candidate	Votes	%	±%
Independent Labor	H. V. Evatt	6,722	53.0	
Labor	Harry Doran	5,949	47.0	
Total formal votes		12,671	98.6	
Informal votes		182	1.4	
Turnout		12,853	87.0	
Independent Labor win		(new seat)		

=== Bankstown ===
1927 New South Wales state election: Bankstown
Party	Candidate	Votes	%	±%
Labor	James McGirr	7,548	55.6	
Nationalist	Arthur Gardiner	5,742	42.3	
Ind. Nationalist	Frederick Webster	181	1.3	
Independent	Alfred Finney	105	0.8	
Total formal votes		13,576	99.1	
Informal votes		118	0.9	
Turnout		13,694	86.4	
Labor win		(new seat)		

=== Barwon ===
1927 New South Wales state election: Barwon
Party	Candidate	Votes	%	±%
Nationalist	Walter Wearne	6,098	52.7	
Labor	George Brand	4,742	41.0	
Independent	George Taylor	739	6.4	
Total formal votes		11,579	98.5	
Informal votes		178	1.5	
Turnout		11,757	84.0	
Nationalist win		(new seat)		

=== Bathurst ===
1927 New South Wales state election: Bathurst
Party	Candidate	Votes	%	±%
Labor	Gus Kelly	6,508	55.1	
Nationalist	Arthur Brown	5,301	44.9	
Total formal votes		11,809	96.6	
Informal votes		414	3.4	
Turnout		12,223	84.7	
Labor win		(new seat)		

=== Bondi ===
1927 New South Wales state election: Bondi
Party	Candidate	Votes	%	±%
Ind. Nationalist	Harold Jaques	7,692	53.5	
Nationalist	Millicent Preston-Stanley (defeated)	3,408	23.7	
Labor	Susan Francis	3,278	22.8	
Total formal votes		14,378	97.9	
Informal votes		310	2.1	
Turnout		14,688	84.8	
Ind. Nationalist win		(new seat)		

Both Harold Jaques and Millicent Preston-Stanley were Nationalist members for Eastern Suburbs and Preston-Stanley won Nationalist pre-selection. Jaques re-joined the Nationalist party after the election.

=== Botany ===
1927 New South Wales state election: Botany
Party	Candidate	Votes	%	±%
Independent Labor	Thomas Mutch	6,281	51.0	
Labor	Bob Heffron	5,661	46.0	
Nationalist	Benjamin Blackburn	374	3.0	
Total formal votes		12,316	99.1	
Informal votes		114	0.9	
Turnout		12,430	88.7	
Independent Labor win		(new seat)		

=== Burwood ===
1927 New South Wales state election: Burwood
Party	Candidate	Votes	%	±%
Nationalist	Thomas Henley	8,555	69.2	
Labor	Henry Joyce	2,858	23.1	
Independent	Harry Beach	949	7.7	
Total formal votes		12,362	99.0	
Informal votes		121	1.0	
Turnout		12,483	80.4	
Nationalist win		(new seat)		

=== Byron ===
1927 New South Wales state election: Byron
Party	Candidate	Votes	%	±%
Independent Country	Frederick Stuart (defeated)	4,316	37.2	
Country	Arthur Budd	4,265	36.8	
Labor	Mark Graham	1,569	13.5	
Independent Labor	Robert Gillies (defeated)	1,449	12.5	
Total formal votes		11,599	97.5	
Informal votes		302	2.5	
Turnout		11,901	82.6	
Two-candidate-preferred result
Country	Arthur Budd	4,940	51.9	
Independent Country	Frederick Stuart	4,584	48.1	
Country win		(new seat)		

=== Canterbury ===
1927 New South Wales state election: Canterbury
Party	Candidate	Votes	%	±%
Labor	Arthur Tonge	7,983	53.9	
Nationalist	Arthur Long	6,841	46.1	
Total formal votes		14,824	99.0	
Informal votes		146	1.0	
Turnout		14,970	86.3	
Labor win		(new seat)		

=== Castlereagh ===
1927 New South Wales state election: Castlereagh
Party	Candidate	Votes	%	±%
Country	Harold Thorby	6,984	52.4	
Labor	Joseph Clark (defeated)	6,353	47.6	
Total formal votes		13,337	99.1	
Informal votes		123	0.9	
Turnout		13,460	84.8	
Country win		(new seat)		

=== Cessnock ===
1927 New South Wales state election: Cessnock
Party	Candidate	Votes	%	±%
Labor	Jack Baddeley	7,736	69.8	
Independent	Malcolm McNeil	3,341	30.2	
Total formal votes		11,077	98.4	
Informal votes		175	1.6	
Turnout		11,252	76.0	
Labor win		(new seat)		

=== Clarence ===
1927 New South Wales state election: Clarence
Party	Candidate	Votes	%	±%
Country	Alfred Pollack	6,563	58.6	
Ind. Nationalist	William Zuill	4,634	41.4	
Total formal votes		11,197	98.7	
Informal votes		144	1.3	
Turnout		11,341	73.0	
Country win		(new seat)		

=== Coogee ===
1927 New South Wales state election: Coogee
Party	Candidate	Votes	%	±%
Nationalist	Hyman Goldstein	9,196	67.6	
Labor	Thomas Brown	4,416	32.4	
Total formal votes		13,612	99.1	
Informal votes		123	0.9	
Turnout		13,735	78.5	
Nationalist win		(new seat)		

=== Cootamundra ===
1927 New South Wales state election: Cootamundra
Party	Candidate	Votes	%	±%
Labor	Ken Hoad	6,293	50.3	
Country	Thomas Fitzpatrick	6,207	49.7	
Total formal votes		12,500	99.0	
Informal votes		129	1.0	
Turnout		12,629	85.0	
Labor win		(new seat)		

=== Corowa ===
1927 New South Wales state election: Corowa
Party	Candidate	Votes	%	±%
Nationalist	Richard Ball	7,267	69.6	
Labor	James Pearce	3,168	30.4	
Total formal votes		10,435	98.3	
Informal votes		183	1.7	
Turnout		10,618	76.2	
Nationalist win		(new seat)		

=== Croydon ===
1927 New South Wales state election: Croydon
Party	Candidate	Votes	%	±%
Nationalist	Bertram Stevens	10,019	66.4	
Labor	Ernest Cook	5,058	33.6	
Total formal votes		15,077	99.0	
Informal votes		159	1.0	
Turnout		15,236	83.2	
Nationalist win		(new seat)		

=== Drummoyne ===
1927 New South Wales state election: Drummoyne
Party	Candidate	Votes	%	±%
Nationalist	John Lee	6,174	41.9	
Labor	David McLelland	5,507	37.4	
Independent	William Gray	3,049	20.7	
Total formal votes		14,730	98.8	
Informal votes		171	1.2	
Turnout		14,901	86.9	
Two-party-preferred result
Nationalist	John Lee	8,689	60.5	
Labor	David McLelland	5,663	39.5	
Nationalist win		(new seat)		

=== Dulwich Hill ===
1927 New South Wales state election: Dulwich Hill
Party	Candidate	Votes	%	±%
Nationalist	John Ness	6,584	44.3	
Labor	Thomas Gilson	5,258	35.4	
Ind. Nationalist	Tom Hoskins (defeated)	2,887	19.4	
Independent	Donald Croal	131	0.9	
Total formal votes		14,860	97.8	
Informal votes		331	2.2	
Turnout		15,191	87.0	
Two-party-preferred result
Nationalist	John Ness	8,427	59.8	
Labor	Thomas Gilson	5,662	40.2	
Nationalist win		(new seat)		

=== Eastwood ===
1927 New South Wales state election: Eastwood
Party	Candidate	Votes	%	±%
Nationalist	David Anderson	7,770	65.5	
Labor	Alan McNamara	3,630	30.6	
Protestant Labour	William Featherstone	463	3.9	
Total formal votes		11,863	98.8	
Informal votes		143	1.2	
Turnout		12,006	81.7	
Nationalist win		(new seat)		

=== Enmore ===
1927 New South Wales state election: Enmore
Party	Candidate	Votes	%	±%
Labor	Joe Lamaro	7,000	57.4	
Nationalist	Henry Morton	5,198	42.6	
Total formal votes		12,198	99.0	
Informal votes		127	1.0	
Turnout		12,325	83.3	
Labor win		(new seat)		

=== Glebe ===
1927 New South Wales state election: Glebe
Party	Candidate	Votes	%	±%
Labor	Tom Keegan	7,777	65.8	
Nationalist	Hedley Rogers	4,042	34.2	
Total formal votes		11,819	99.0	
Informal votes		124	1.0	
Turnout		11,943	81.2	
Labor win		(new seat)		

=== Gloucester ===
1927 New South Wales state election: Gloucester
Party	Candidate	Votes	%	±%
Nationalist	Walter Bennett	6,146	52.2	
Ind. Nationalist	William Brown	2,687	22.8	
Labor	Henry Hall	1,650	14.0	
Independent	William Flannery	1,293	11.0	
Total formal votes		11,776	98.6	
Informal votes		167	1.4	
Turnout		11,943	81.3	
Nationalist win		(new seat)		

=== Gordon ===
1927 New South Wales state election: Gordon
Party	Candidate	Votes	%	±%
Nationalist	Thomas Bavin	11,799	87.0	
Labor	Oscar Mostyn	1,768	13.0	
Total formal votes		13,567	99.1	
Informal votes		129	0.9	
Turnout		13,696	85.3	
Nationalist win		(new seat)		

=== Goulburn ===
1927 New South Wales state election: Goulburn
Party	Candidate	Votes	%	±%
Labor	Jack Tully	6,853	48.4	
Nationalist	John Garry	6,230	44.0	
Independent	Archibald Turnbull	1,087	7.7	
Total formal votes		14,170	98.9	
Informal votes		157	1.1	
Turnout		14,327	87.2	
Two-party-preferred result
Labor	Jack Tully	7,026	50.6	
Nationalist	John Garry	6,849	49.4	
Labor win		(new seat)		

=== Granville ===
1927 New South Wales state election: Granville
Party	Candidate	Votes	%	±%
Labor	Bill Ely	8,076	57.5	
Nationalist	Thomas Morrow	4,948	35.2	
Independent	John Colquhoun	1,024	7.3	
Total formal votes		14,048	98.9	
Informal votes		158	1.1	
Turnout		14,206	89.2	
Labor win		(new seat)		

=== Hamilton ===
1927 New South Wales state election: Hamilton
Party	Candidate	Votes	%	±%
Labor	David Murray	8,508	58.6	
Nationalist	Edward Sanders	2,977	20.5	
Independent	George Jenner	1,750	12.1	
Protestant Labour	James Pendlebury	1,204	8.3	
Independent	John Wilson	72	0.5	
Total formal votes		14,511	97.9	
Informal votes		304	2.1	
Turnout		14,815	85.0	
Labor win		(new seat)		

=== Hartley ===
1927 New South Wales state election: Hartley
Party	Candidate	Votes	%	±%
Labor	Hamilton Knight	7,582	57.5	
Nationalist	Crawford Vaughan	5,603	42.5	
Total formal votes		13,185	99.2	
Informal votes		112	0.8	
Turnout		13,297	82.9	
Labor win		(new seat)		

=== Hawkesbury ===
1927 New South Wales state election: Hawkesbury
Party	Candidate	Votes	%	±%
Nationalist	Bruce Walker Sr	7,553	66.9	
Labor	Florence Ewers	2,501	22.1	
Independent	William Grahame	1,242	11.0	
Total formal votes		11,296	98.7	
Informal votes		145	1.3	
Turnout		11,441	77.6	
Nationalist win		(new seat)		

=== Hornsby ===
1927 New South Wales state election: Hornsby
Party	Candidate	Votes	%	±%
Nationalist	James Shand	9,111	75.1	
Labor	Percy Hannett	3,017	24.9	
Total formal votes		12,128	98.4	
Informal votes		200	1.6	
Turnout		12,328	83.8	
Nationalist win		(new seat)		

=== Hurstville ===
1927 New South Wales state election: Hurstville
Party	Candidate	Votes	%	±%
Nationalist	John Nield	6,910	48.4	
Labor	Walter Butler	6,908	48.4	
Independent	Walter Anderson	429	3.0	
Independent	William Hodge	41	0.3	
Total formal votes		14,288	98.9	
Informal votes		153	1.1	
Turnout		14,441	85.8	
Two-party-preferred result
Labor	Walter Butler	7,039	50.1	
Nationalist	John Nield	7,002	49.9	
Labor win		(new seat)		

=== Illawarra ===
1927 New South Wales state election: Illawarra
Party	Candidate	Votes	%	±%
Labor	Andrew Lysaght Jr.	7,133	56.0	
Nationalist	Brian Doe (defeated)	5,610	44.0	
Total formal votes		12,743	98.2	
Informal votes		235	1.8	
Turnout		12,978	87.6	
Labor win		(new seat)		

=== Kahibah ===
1927 New South Wales state election: Kahibah
Party	Candidate	Votes	%	±%
Labor	Hugh Connell	9,228	72.6	
Nationalist	Arthur Ashton	3,480	27.4	
Total formal votes		12,708	99.2	
Informal votes		108	0.8	
Turnout		12,816	83.2	
Labor win		(new seat)		

=== King ===
1927 New South Wales state election: King
Party	Candidate	Votes	%	±%
Labor	Daniel Clyne	6,637	62.9	
Nationalist	George Overhill	3,914	37.1	
Total formal votes		10,551	98.8	
Informal votes		125	1.2	
Turnout		10,676	65.3	
Labor win		(new seat)		

=== Kurri Kurri ===
1927 New South Wales state election: Kurri Kurri
Party	Candidate	Votes	%	±%
Labor	George Booth	10,162	85.1	
Independent Labor	Thomas Pearce	1,777	14.9	
Total formal votes		11,939	98.8	
Informal votes		148	1.2	
Turnout		12,087	80.9	
Labor win		(new seat)		

=== Lachlan ===
1927 New South Wales state election: Lachlan
Party	Candidate	Votes	%	±%
Country	Ernest Buttenshaw	7,223	60.6	
Labor	Michael Roddy	4,699	39.4	
Total formal votes		11,922	98.5	
Informal votes		183	1.5	
Turnout		12,105	74.6	
Country win		(new seat)		

=== Lakemba ===
1927 New South Wales state election: Lakemba
Party	Candidate	Votes	%	±%
Labor	Fred Stanley	7,498	47.9	
Nationalist	John Scott	5,976	38.2	
Independent Labor	George Cann (defeated)	2,174	13.9	
Total formal votes		15,648	98.6	
Informal votes		216	1.4	
Turnout		15,864	88.9	
Two-party-preferred result
Labor	Fred Stanley	8,005	54.5	
Nationalist	John Scott	6,674	45.5	
Labor win		(new seat)		

=== Lane Cove ===
1927 New South Wales state election: Lane Cove
Party	Candidate	Votes	%	±%
Nationalist	Bryce Walmsley	7,618	57.8	
Labor	Edgar Nelson	2,987	22.7	
Ind. Nationalist	Frederick Dunn	2,585	19.6	
Total formal votes		13,190	98.6	
Informal votes		181	1.4	
Turnout		13,371	82.1	
Nationalist win		(new seat)		

=== Leichhardt ===
1927 New South Wales state election: Leichhardt
Party	Candidate	Votes	%	±%
Labor	Barney Olde	7,136	53.6	
Nationalist	Albert Lane (defeated)	5,912	44.4	
Independent	George Boland	276	2.1	
Total formal votes		13,324	99.0	
Informal votes		138	1.0	
Turnout		13,462	85.7	
Labor win		(new seat)		

=== Lismore ===
1927 New South Wales state election: Lismore
Party	Candidate	Votes	%	±%
Country	William Missingham	9,008	74.0	
Independent	George Boyd	3,157	26.0	
Total formal votes		12,165	99.1	
Informal votes		109	0.9	
Turnout		12,274	78.7	
Country win		(new seat)		

=== Liverpool Plains ===
1927 New South Wales state election: Liverpool Plains
Party	Candidate	Votes	%	±%
Country	Harry Carter	6,813	54.7	
Labor	Michael Hagan	5,630	45.3	
Total formal votes		12,443	98.6	
Informal votes		174	1.4	
Turnout		12,617	85.4	
Country win		(new seat)		

=== Maitland ===
1927 New South Wales state election: Maitland
Party	Candidate	Votes	%	±%
Labor	Walter O'Hearn	7,209	55.4	
Nationalist	Walter Howarth	5,803	44.6	
Total formal votes		13,012	99.2	
Informal votes		107	0.8	
Turnout		13,119	86.5	
Labor win		(new seat)		

=== Manly ===
1927 New South Wales state election: Manly
Party	Candidate	Votes	%	±%
Nationalist	Alfred Reid	8,319	63.3	
Labor	Jack White	2,782	21.2	
Ind. Nationalist	Francis Corkery	2,031	15.5	
Total formal votes		13,132	98.9	
Informal votes		1e9	1.1	
Turnout		13,271	82.7	
Nationalist win		(new seat)		

=== Marrickville ===
1927 New South Wales state election: Marrickville
Party	Candidate	Votes	%	±%
Labor	Carlo Lazzarini	8,325	62.5	
Nationalist	Percy Mansell	5,002	37.5	
Total formal votes		13,327	99.1	
Informal votes		122	0.9	
Turnout		13,449	87.1	
Labor win		(new seat)		

=== Monaro ===
1927 New South Wales state election: Monaro
Party	Candidate	Votes	%	±%
Country	William Hedges	6,614	52.3	
Labor	Paddy Stokes (defeated)	6,020	47.7	
Total formal votes		12,634	98.3	
Informal votes		223	1.7	
Turnout		12,857	84.6	
Country win		(new seat)		

=== Mosman ===
1927 New South Wales state election: Mosman
Party	Candidate	Votes	%	±%
Nationalist	Richard Arthur	10,540	90.9	
Independent	George Barrington	1,055	9.1	
Total formal votes		11,595	97.8	
Informal votes		259	2.2	
Turnout		11,854	72.8	
Nationalist win		(new seat)		

=== Mudgee ===
1927 New South Wales state election: Mudgee
Party	Candidate	Votes	%	±%
Labor	Bill Dunn	6,948	54.1	
Country	Gordon Wilkins	5,904	45.9	
Total formal votes		12,852	99.4	
Informal votes		79	0.6	
Turnout		12,931	88.9	
Labor win		(new seat)		

=== Murray ===
1927 New South Wales state election: Murray
Party	Candidate	Votes	%	±%
Labor	Mat Davidson	5,855	52.3	
Nationalist	John Dowling	5,341	47.7	
Total formal votes		11,196	98.5	
Informal votes		171	1.5	
Turnout		11,367	76.3	
Labor win		(new seat)		

=== Murrumbidgee ===
1927 New South Wales state election: Murrumbidgee
Party	Candidate	Votes	%	±%
Labor	Martin Flannery	6,005	50.2	
Country	William Adams	5,947	49.8	
Total formal votes		11,952	98.9	
Informal votes		129	1.1	
Turnout		12,081	76.5	
Labor win		(new seat)		

=== Namoi ===
1927 New South Wales state election: Namoi
Party	Candidate	Votes	%	±%
Labor	William Scully	6,035	50.1	
Nationalist	Leslie Seccombe	5,442	45.1	
Independent	Henry Jones	579	4.8	
Total formal votes		12,056	98.2	
Informal votes		216	1.8	
Turnout		12,272	79.5	
Labor win		(new seat)		

=== Nepean ===
1927 New South Wales state election: Nepean
Party	Candidate	Votes	%	±%
Nationalist	Joseph Jackson	8,055	65.7	
Labor	William Long	3,996	32.6	
Independent	Thomas Gollan	131	1.1	
Independent	William Miller	76	0.6	
Total formal votes		12,258	98.9	
Informal votes		139	1.1	
Turnout		12,397	80.0	
Nationalist win		(new seat)		

=== Neutral Bay ===
1927 New South Wales state election: Neutral Bay
Party	Candidate	Votes	%	±%
Nationalist	Reginald Weaver	9,076	69.5	
Independent Labor	Alfred Waterhouse	2,451	18.8	
Ind. Nationalist	Frederick Aarons	1,533	11.7	
Total formal votes		13,060	98.6	
Informal votes		184	1.4	
Turnout		13,244	80.8	
Nationalist win		(new seat)		

=== Newcastle ===
1927 New South Wales state election: Newcastle
Party	Candidate	Votes	%	±%
Labor	Peter Connolly	7,644	58.5	
Nationalist	George Waller	3,969	30.4	
Independent	Walter Baxter	1,457	11.2	
Total formal votes		13,070	99.0	
Informal votes		129	1.0	
Turnout		13,199	83.3	
Labor win		(new seat)		

=== Newtown ===
1927 New South Wales state election: Newtown
Party	Candidate	Votes	%	±%
Labor	Frank Burke	8,686	74.6	
Nationalist	William Pickup	2,956	25.4	
Total formal votes		11,642	98.7	
Informal votes		155	1.3	
Turnout		11,797	80.7	
Labor win		(new seat)		

=== North Sydney ===
1927 New South Wales state election: North Sydney
Party	Candidate	Votes	%	±%
Nationalist	Ernest Marks	6,704	53.2	
Labor	Ben Howe	5,850	46.4	
Independent	Harry Meatheringham	43	0.3	
Total formal votes		12,597	98.9	
Informal votes		144	1.1	
Turnout		12,741	79.6	
Nationalist win		(new seat)		

=== Oatley ===
1927 New South Wales state election: Oatley
Party	Candidate	Votes	%	±%
Labor	Mark Gosling	7,733	51.3	
Nationalist	James Webb	7,250	48.1	
Independent	John Gager	102	0.7	
Total formal votes		15,085	99.4	
Informal votes		88	0.6	
Turnout		15,173	86.4	
Labor win		(new seat)		

=== Orange ===
1927 New South Wales state election: Orange
Party	Candidate	Votes	%	±%
Nationalist	John Fitzpatrick	7,047	58.1	
Labor	William Folster	5,074	41.9	
Total formal votes		12,121	97.8	
Informal votes		272	2.2	
Turnout		12,393	83.1	
Nationalist win		(new seat)		

=== Oxley ===
1927 New South Wales state election: Oxley
Party	Candidate	Votes	%	±%
Nationalist	Lewis Martin	7,000	61.7	
Independent	John Thomson	3,303	29.1	
Independent	Albert Suters	1,043	9.2	
Total formal votes		11,346	98.9	
Informal votes		129	1.1	
Turnout		11,475	77.9	
Nationalist win		(new seat)		

=== Paddington ===
1927 New South Wales state election: Paddington
Party	Candidate	Votes	%	±%
Nationalist	Daniel Levy	7,913	55.3	
Labor	William Bates	6,390	44.7	
Total formal votes		14,303	98.2	
Informal votes		259	1.8	
Turnout		14,562	81.6	
Nationalist win		(new seat)		

=== Parramatta ===
1927 New South Wales state election: Parramatta
Party	Candidate	Votes	%	±%
Nationalist	Albert Bruntnell	9,236	62.0	
Labor	Alfred Warton	5,668	38.0	
Total formal votes		14,904	98.4	
Informal votes		239	1.6	
Turnout		15,143	84.2	
Nationalist win		(new seat)		

=== Phillip ===
1927 New South Wales state election: Phillip
Party	Candidate	Votes	%	±%
Labor	Michael Burke	8,645	79.3	
Nationalist	William Weller	2,111	19.4	
Independent	Mary Grayndler	147	1.4	
Total formal votes		10,903	98.4	
Informal votes		181	1.6	
Turnout		11,084	75.0	
Labor win		(new seat)		

=== Raleigh ===
1927 New South Wales state election: Raleigh
Party	Candidate	Votes	%	±%
Country	Roy Vincent	8,172	73.3	
Labor	John Connolly	2,979	26.7	
Total formal votes		11,151	98.9	
Informal votes		120	1.1	
Turnout		11,271	78.3	
Country win		(new seat)		

=== Randwick ===
1927 New South Wales state election: Randwick
Party	Candidate	Votes	%	±%
Nationalist	Ernest Tresider	7,957	54.1	
Labor	Jack Flanagan	6,739	45.9	
Total formal votes		14,696	98.7	
Informal votes		191	1.3	
Turnout		14,887	82.3	
Nationalist win		(new seat)		

=== Redfern ===
1927 New South Wales state election: Redfern
Party	Candidate	Votes	%	±%
Labor	William McKell	9,871	75.5	
Nationalist	Frederick Meiklejohn	3,197	24.5	
Total formal votes		13,068	97.8	
Informal votes		294	2.2	
Turnout		13,362	81.2	
Labor win		(new seat)		

=== Rockdale ===
1927 New South Wales state election: Rockdale
Party	Candidate	Votes	%	±%
Nationalist	Guy Arkins	7,876	55.1	
Labor	Edgar Levey	6,412	44.9	
Total formal votes		14,288	99.0	
Informal votes		149	1.0	
Turnout		14,437	89.0	
Nationalist win		(new seat)		

=== Rozelle ===
1927 New South Wales state election: Rozelle
Party	Candidate	Votes	%	±%
Labor	John Quirk	7,126	53.4	
Nationalist	Albert Smith	4,925	36.9	
Independent Labor	Cecil Murphy (defeated)	1,181	8.9	
Independent	Arthur Doughty	106	0.8	
Total formal votes		13,338	97.9	
Informal votes		283	2.1	
Turnout		13,621	86.1	
Labor win		(new seat)		

=== Ryde ===
1927 New South Wales state election: Ryde
Party	Candidate	Votes	%	±%
Labor	Henry McDicken	7,363	51.4	
Nationalist	Arthur Bridges	6,507	45.4	
Independent	Francis Pacey	463	3.2	
Total formal votes		14,333	98.5	
Informal votes		211	1.5	
Turnout		14,544	87.1	
Labor win		(new seat)		

=== St George ===
1927 New South Wales state election: St George
Party	Candidate	Votes	%	±%
Labor	Joseph Cahill	8,137	55.9	
Nationalist	James Morrish	6,430	44.1	
Total formal votes		14,567	99.1	
Informal votes		138	0.9	
Turnout		14,705	86.9	
Labor win		(new seat)		

=== South Coast ===
1927 New South Wales state election: South Coast
Party	Candidate	Votes	%	±%
Nationalist	Henry Bate	8,188	72.1	
Labor	Francis Rifley	3,161	27.9	
Total formal votes		11,349	98.5	
Informal votes		176	1.5	
Turnout		11,525	78.7	
Nationalist win		(new seat)		

=== Sturt ===
1927 New South Wales state election: Sturt
Party	Candidate	Votes	%	±%
Labor	Ted Horsington	7,218	70.0	
Nationalist	Alfred Gorrie	3,088	30.0	
Total formal votes		10,306	98.6	
Informal votes		151	1.4	
Turnout		10,457	74.8	
Labor win		(new seat)		

=== Surry Hills ===
1927 New South Wales state election: Surry Hills
Party	Candidate	Votes	%	±%
Labor	Tom Shannon	7,536	66.1	
Nationalist	William Adkins	3,694	32.4	
Independent	John Salmon	175	1.5	
Total formal votes		11,405	98.6	
Informal votes		164	1.4	
Turnout		11,569	76.7	
Labor win		(new seat)		

=== Tamworth ===
1927 New South Wales state election: Tamworth
Party	Candidate	Votes	%	±%
Nationalist	Frank Chaffey	7,990	71.4	
Independent	Robert Levien	3,203	28.6	
Total formal votes		11,193	97.6	
Informal votes		270	2.4	
Turnout		11,463	78.8	
Nationalist win		(new seat)		

=== Temora ===
1927 New South Wales state election: Temora
Party	Candidate	Votes	%	±%
Country	Hugh Main	7,692	65.6	
Labor	David Nilon	3,548	30.3	
Independent Labor	George Burgess	481	4.1	
Total formal votes		11,721	98.5	
Informal votes		181	1.5	
Turnout		11,902	79.9	
Country win		(new seat)		

=== Tenterfield ===
1927 New South Wales state election: Tenterfield
Party	Candidate	Votes	%	±%
Country	Michael Bruxner	unopposed		
Country win		(new seat)		

=== Upper Hunter ===
1927 New South Wales state election: Upper Hunter
Party	Candidate	Votes	%	±%
Nationalist	William Cameron	7,561	66.3	
Labor	James Russell	3,843	33.7	
Total formal votes		11,404	98.6	
Informal votes		163	1.4	
Turnout		11,567	81.9	
Nationalist win		(new seat)		

=== Vaucluse ===
1927 New South Wales state election: Vaucluse
Party	Candidate	Votes	%	±%
Nationalist	William Foster	11,287	84.1	
Labor	Henrietta Greville	2,128	15.9	
Total formal votes		13,415	99.3	
Informal votes		88	0.7	
Turnout		13,503	77.6	
Nationalist win		(new seat)		

=== Wagga Wagga ===
1927 New South Wales state election: Wagga Wagga
Party	Candidate	Votes	%	±%
Country	Matthew Kilpatrick	7,602	66.6	
Labor	Edward Locke	3,818	33.4	
Total formal votes		11,420	98.5	
Informal votes		169	1.5	
Turnout		11,589	82.0	
Country win		(new seat)		

=== Wallsend ===
1927 New South Wales state election: Wallsend
Party	Candidate	Votes	%	±%
Labor	Robert Cameron	7,668	57.8	
Protestant Labour	Walter Skelton (defeated)	5,597	42.2	
Total formal votes		13,265	99.3	
Informal votes		94	0.7	
Turnout		13,359	82.6	
Labor win		(new seat)		

=== Waverley ===
1927 New South Wales state election: Waverley
Party	Candidate	Votes	%	±%
Nationalist	Carl Glasgow	7,501	55.4	
Labor	Archibald Moate	6,038	44.6	
Total formal votes		13,539	99.3	
Informal votes		92	0.7	
Turnout		13,631	86.7	
Nationalist win		(new seat)		

=== Willoughby ===
1927 New South Wales state election: Willoughby
Party	Candidate	Votes	%	±%
Nationalist	Vernon Treatt	6,338	39.3	
Ind. Nationalist	Edward Sanders	5,831	36.2	
Labor	Richard Lynch	3,949	24.5	
Total formal votes		16,118	98.2	
Informal votes		301	1.8	
Turnout		16,419	86.7	
Two-candidate-preferred result
Ind. Nationalist	Edward Sanders	6,663	50.5	
Nationalist	Vernon Treatt	6,522	49.5	
Ind. Nationalist win		(new seat)		

=== Wollondilly ===
1927 New South Wales state election: Wollondilly
Party	Candidate	Votes	%	±%
Nationalist	George Fuller	7,249	62.5	
Labor	Daniel Chalker	4,342	37.5	
Total formal votes		11,591	98.9	
Informal votes		132	1.1	
Turnout		11,723	81.8	
Nationalist win		(new seat)		

=== Wollongong ===
1927 New South Wales state election: Wollongong
Party	Candidate	Votes	%	±%
Labor	Billy Davies	8,863	62.7	
Nationalist	Norman Smith	5,263	37.3	
Total formal votes		14,126	99.4	
Informal votes		84	0.6	
Turnout		14,210	89.3	
Labor win		(new seat)		

=== Woollahra ===
1927 New South Wales state election: Woollahra
Party	Candidate	Votes	%	±%
Labor	Maurice O'Sullivan	6,589	51.4	
Nationalist	Frederick Davison	5,263	41.0	
Independent Labor	Septimus Alldis (defeated)	974	7.6	
Total formal votes		12,826	98.6	
Informal votes		175	1.4	
Turnout		13,001	84.0	
Labor win		(new seat)		

=== Young ===
1927 New South Wales state election: Young
Party	Candidate	Votes	%	±%
Country	Albert Reid	4,349	35.2	
Independent Labor	Peter Loughlin (defeated)	4,082	33.0	
Labor	George McCarthy	3,932	31.8	
Total formal votes		12,363	99.2	
Informal votes		104	0.8	
Turnout		12,467	84.3	
Two-candidate-preferred result
Country	Albert Reid	4,603	50.3	
Independent Labor	Peter Loughlin	4,542	49.7	
Country win		(new seat)		

== See also ==
- Candidates of the 1927 New South Wales state election
- Members of the New South Wales Legislative Assembly, 1927–1930
