= Members of the New South Wales Legislative Assembly, 1927–1930 =

Members of the New South Wales Legislative Assembly who served in the 28th parliament of New South Wales held their seats from 1927 to 1930. They were elected at the 1927 state election, and at by-elections. The Speaker was Sir Daniel Levy.

| Name | Party | Electorate | Term in office |
|---|---|---|---|
| David Anderson | Nationalist | Eastwood | 1920–1930 |
| Guy Arkins | Nationalist | Rockdale | 1915–1930, 1938–1941 |
| Richard Arthur | Nationalist | Mosman | 1904–1932 |
| Jack Baddeley | Labor | Cessnock | 1922–1949 |
| Richard Ball | Nationalist | Corowa | 1895–1898, 1904–1937 |
| Henry Bate | Nationalist | South Coast | 1926–1941 |
| Thomas Bavin | Nationalist | Gordon | 1917–1935 |
| Walter Bennett | Nationalist | Gloucester | 1889–1902, 1917–1934 |
| Edmund Best | Nationalist | Ashburnham | 1925–1930 |
| George Booth | Labor | Kurri Kurri | 1925–1960 |
| Albert Bruntnell (Note: Parramatta Nationalist MLA Albert Bruntnell died on 31 January 1929. Nationalist candidate Herbert Lloyd won the resulting by-election on 23 February 1929.) | Nationalist | Parramatta | 1906–1907, 1910–1913, 1916–1929 |
| Michael Bruxner | Country | Tenterfield | 1920–1962 |
| Arthur Budd | Country | Byron | 1927–1944 |
| Frank Burke | Labor | Newtown | 1917–1944 |
| Michael Burke | Labor | Phillip | 1917–1922, 1925–1930 |
| Walter Butler | Labor | Hurstville | 1927–1932 |
| Ernest Buttenshaw | Country | Lachlan | 1917–1938 |
| Joseph Cahill | Labor | St George | 1925–1932, 1935–1959 |
| Robert Cameron | Labor | Wallsend | 1927–1956 |
| William Cameron | Nationalist | Upper Hunter | 1918–1931 |
| Harry Carter | Country | Liverpool Plains | 1927–1941 |
| Frank Chaffey | Nationalist | Tamworth | 1913–1940 |
| Daniel Clyne | Labor | King | 1927–1956 |
| Hugh Connell | Labor | Kahibah | 1920–1934 |
| Peter Connolly | Labor | Newcastle | 1927–1935 |
| Mat Davidson | Labor | Murray | 1918–1949 |
| Billy Davies | Labor | Wollongong | 1917–1949 |
| David Drummond | Country | Armidale | 1920–1949 |
| Bill Dunn | Labor | Mudgee | 1910–1911, 1911–1932, 1935–1950 |
| John Dunningham (Note: Coogee Nationalist MLA Hyman Goldstein died in mysterious circumstances on 3 September 1928. Nationalist Party candidate John Dunningham won the resulting by-election on 22 September 1928.) | Nationalist | Coogee | 1928–1938 |
| Bill Ely | Labor | Granville | 1927–1932 |
| H. V. Evatt | Independent Labor | Balmain | 1925–1930 |
| John Fitzpatrick | Nationalist | Orange | 1895–1904, 1907–1930 |
| Herbert FitzSimons (Note: Lane Cove Nationalist MLA Bryce Walmsley died on 21 June 1930. Nationalist candidate Herbert FitzSimons won the resulting by-election on 26 July 1930.) | Nationalist | Lane Cove | 1930–1944 |
| Martin Flannery | Labor | Murrumbidgee | 1920–1932 |
| William Foster | Nationalist | Vaucluse | 1925–1936 |
| Sir George Fuller (Note: Wollondilly Nationalist Party MLA Sir George Fuller was appointed Agent-General in London in February 1928. Nationalist Party candidate Mark Morton won the resulting by-election on 3 March 1928.) | Nationalist | Wollondilly | 1889–1894, 1915–1928 |
| Carl Glasgow | Nationalist | Waverley | 1927–1930 |
| Hyman Goldstein | Nationalist | Coogee | 1922–1928 |
| Mark Gosling | Labor | Oatley | 1920–1932 |
| William Hedges | Country | Monaro | 1927–1941 |
| Sir Thomas Henley | Nationalist | Burwood | 1904–1935 |
| Ken Hoad | Labor | Cootamundra | 1925–1932 |
| Ted Horsington | Labor | Sturt | 1922–1947 |
| Joseph Jackson | Nationalist | Nepean | 1922–1956 |
| Harold Jaques | Ind. Nationalist | Bondi | 1920–1930 |
| Milton Jarvie (Note: Ashfield Nationalist Party MLA Milton Jarvie resigned when he was implicated in a bribery scandal. He won the resulting by-election on 5 October 1929.) | Nationalist | Ashfield | 1925–1929, 1929–1935 |
| Tom Keegan | Labor | Glebe | 1910–1920, 1921–1935 |
| Gus Kelly | Labor | Bathurst | 1925–1932, 1935–1967 |
| Matthew Kilpatrick | Country | Wagga Wagga | 1920–1941 |
| Hamilton Knight | Labor | Hartley | 1927–1947 |
| Joe Lamaro | Labor | Enmore | 1927–1932, 1932–1934 |
| Jack Lang | Labor | Auburn | 1913–1943, 1943–1946 |
| Carlo Lazzarini | Labor | Marrickville | 1917–1952 |
| John Lee | Nationalist | Drummoyne | 1920–1930, 1932–1941 |
| Sir Daniel Levy | Nationalist | Paddington | 1901–1937 |
| Herbert Lloyd | Nationalist | Parramatta | 1929–1941 |
| Andrew Lysaght | Labor | Illawarra | 1925–1933 |
| Hugh Main | Country | Temora | 1922–1938 |
| Ernest Marks | Nationalist | North Sydney | 1927–1930 |
| Lewis Martin | Nationalist | Oxley | 1927–1941 |
| Henry McDicken | Labor | Ryde | 1927–1932 |
| James McGirr | Labor | Bankstown | 1922–1952 |
| William McKell | Labor | Redfern | 1917–1947 |
| William Missingham | Country | Lismore | 1922–1933 |
| Mark Morton | Nationalist | Wollondilly | 1901–1920, 1922–1938 |
| David Murray (Note: Hamilton Labor MLA David Murray died on 5 August 1928. Labor candidate James Smith won the resulting by-election on 8 September 1928.) | Labor | Hamilton | 1921–1928 |
| Thomas Mutch | Independent Labor | Botany | 1917–1930, 1938–1941 |
| John Ness | Nationalist | Dulwich Hill | 1927–1930, 1932–1938 |
| Barney Olde | Labor | Leichhardt | 1927–1932 |
| Walter O'Hearn | Labor | Maitland | 1920–1932 |
| Maurice O'Sullivan | Labor | Woollahra | 1927–1959 |
| Alfred Pollack | Country | Clarence | 1927–1931 |
| John Quirk | Labor | Rozelle | 1917–1938 |
| Bill Ratcliffe | Labor | Alexandria | 1922–1932 |
| Albert Reid | Country | Young | 1927–1930, 1932–1941 |
| Alfred Reid | Nationalist | Manly | 1920–1922, 1925–1945 |
| John Ross | Nationalist | Albury | 1927–1930 |
| Edward Sanders | Ind. Nationalist | Willoughby | 1925–1943 |
| William Scully | Labor | Namoi | 1923–1932 |
| James Shand | Nationalist | Hornsby | 1926–1944 |
| Tom Shannon | Labor | Surry Hills | 1927–1954 |
| James Smith | Labor | Hamilton | 1928–1930 |
| Fred Stanley | Labor | Lakemba | 1927–1950 |
| Bertram Stevens | Nationalist | Croydon | 1927–1940 |
| Robert Stuart-Robertson | Labor | Annandale | 1907–1933 |
| Harold Thorby | Country | Castlereagh | 1922–1930 |
| Arthur Tonge | Labor | Canterbury | 1926–1932, 1935–1962 |
| Ernest Tresidder | Nationalist | Randwick | 1927–1930 |
| Jack Tully | Labor | Goulburn | 1927–1932, 1935–1946 |
| Roy Vincent | Country | Raleigh | 1922–1953 |
| Bruce Walker | Nationalist | Hawkesbury | 1917–1932 |
| Bryce Walmsley | Nationalist | Lane Cove | 1927–1930 |
| Walter Wearne | Nationalist | Barwon | 1917–1930 |
| Reginald Weaver | Nationalist | Neutral Bay | 1917–1925, 1927–1945 |

== See also ==
- Bavin ministry
- Results of the 1927 New South Wales state election
- Candidates of the 1927 New South Wales state election
