= Candidates of the 1927 New South Wales state election =

This is a list of candidates for the 1927 New South Wales state election. The election was held on 8 October 1927.

== Retiring members ==
=== Labor ===
- James Dooley (Bathurst)
- Joseph Fitzgerald (Oxley)
- Robert Greig (Ryde)
- William Holdsworth (Sydney)
- Edward McTiernan (Western Suburbs)
- Bob O'Halloran (Eastern Suburbs)

=== Nationalist ===
- William Bagnall (St George)
- Theodore Hill (Oxley)

=== Other ===
- William Fell (Independent Nationalist, North Shore)

== Legislative Assembly ==
Sitting members are shown in bold text. Successful candidates are highlighted in the relevant colour. Where there is possible confusion, an asterisk (*) is also used.

This election reintroduced single-member constituencies after three elections conducted under proportional representation. As such, electorates are not listed as being held by any one party.

Electorate	Labor candidate	Coalition candidate	Other candidates
Albury	James Hannan	John Ross (Nat)	George Daniel (Ind); **Vern Goodin** (Ind Lab); Charles Riley (Ind)
Alexandria	**Bill Ratcliffe**	Ernest Kidd (Nat)	
Annandale	**Robert Stuart-Robertson**	Edward Hogan (Nat)	
Armidale	**Alfred McClelland**	**David Drummond** (CP)	
Ashburnham	William Keast	**Edmund Best** (Nat)	
Ashfield	Walter Sparrow	**Milton Jarvie** (Nat)	Alexander Huie (Ind)
Auburn	**Jack Lang**		Tom Cheetham (Ind); **Patrick Minahan** (Ind Lab)
Balmain	Harry Doran		**H. V. Evatt** (Ind Lab)
Bankstown	**James McGirr**	Arthur Gardiner (Nat)	Alfred Finney (Ind); Frederick Webster (Ind Nat)
Barwon	George Brand	**Walter Wearne** (Nat)	George Taylor (Ind)
Bathurst	**Gus Kelly**	Arthur Brown (Nat)	
Bondi	Susan Francis	**Millicent Preston-Stanley** (Nat)	**Harold Jaques** (Ind Nat)
Botany	Bob Heffron	Benjamin Blackburn (Nat)	**Thomas Mutch** (Ind Lab)
Burwood	Henry Joyce	**Sir Thomas Henley** (Nat)	Harry Beach (Ind)
Byron	Mark Graham	Arthur Budd (CP)	**Robert Gillies** (Ind Lab); **Frederick Stuart** (Ind CP)
Canterbury	**Arthur Tonge**	Arthur Long (Nat)	
Castlereagh	**Joseph Clark**	**Harold Thorby** (CP)	
Cessnock	**Jack Baddeley**		Malcolm McNeil (Ind)
Clarence		Alfred Pollack (CP)	William Zuill (Ind Nat)
Coogee	Thomas Brown	Hyman Goldstein (Nat)	
Cootamundra	**Ken Hoad**	Thomas Fitzpatrick (CP)	
Corowa	James Pearce	**Richard Ball** (Nat)	
Croydon	Ernest Cook	Bertram Stevens (Nat)	
Drummoyne	David McLelland	**John Lee** (Nat)	William Gray (Ind)
Dulwich Hill	Thomas Gilson	**John Ness** (Nat)	Donald Croal (Ind); **Tom Hoskins** (Ind Nat)
Eastwood	Alan McNamara	**David Anderson** (Nat)	William Featherstone (PLP)
Enmore	Joe Lamaro	Henry Morton (Nat)	
Glebe	**Tom Keegan**	Hedley Rogers (Nat)	
Gloucester	Henry Hall	**Walter Bennett** (Nat)	William Brown (Ind Nat); William Flannery (Ind)
Gordon	Oscar Mostyn	**Thomas Bavin** (Nat)	
Goulburn	**Jack Tully**	Jack Garry (Nat)	Archibald Turnbull (Ind)
Granville	**Bill Ely**	Thomas Morrow (Nat)	John Colquhoun (Ind)
Hamilton	**David Murray**	Edward Sanders (Nat)	George Jenner (Ind); James Pendlebury (PLP); John Wilson (Ind)
Hartley	Hamilton Knight	Crawford Vaughan (Nat)	
Hawkesbury	Florence Ewers	**Bruce Walker Sr** (Nat)	William Grahame (Ind)
Hornsby	Percy Hannett	**James Shand** (Nat)	
Hurstville	Walter Butler	John Nield (Nat)	Walter Anderson (Ind); William Hodge (Ind)
Illawarra	**Andrew Lysaght**	**Brian Doe** (Nat)	
Kahibah	**Hugh Connell**	Arthur Ashton (Nat)	
King	Daniel Clyne	George Overhill (Nat)	
Kurri Kurri	**George Booth**		Thomas Pearce (Ind Lab)
Lachlan	Michael Roddy	**Ernest Buttenshaw** (CP)	
Lakemba	Fred Stanley	John Scott (Nat)	**George Cann** (Ind Lab)
Lane Cove	Edgar Nelson	Bryce Walmsley (Nat)	Frederick Dunn (Ind Nat)
Leichhardt	Barney Olde	**Albert Lane** (Nat)	George Boland (Ind)
Lismore		**William Missingham** (CP)	George Boyd (Ind)
Liverpool Plains	Michael Hagan	Harry Carter (CP)	
Maitland	**Walter O'Hearn**	Walter Howarth (Nat)	
Manly	Jack White	**Alfred Reid** (Nat)	Francis Corkery (Ind Nat)
Marrickville	**Carlo Lazzarini**	Percy Mansell (Nat)	
Monaro	**Paddy Stokes**	William Hedges (CP)	
Mosman		**Richard Arthur** (Nat)	George Barrington (Ind)
Mudgee	**Bill Dunn**	Gordon Wilkins (CP)	
Murray	**Mat Davidson**	John Dowling (Nat)	
Murrumbidgee	**Martin Flannery**	William Adams (CP)	
Namoi	**William Scully**	Leslie Seccombe (Nat)	Henry Jones (Ind)
Nepean	William Long	**Joseph Jackson** (Nat)	Thomas Gollan (Ind); William Miller (Ind)
Neutral Bay		Reginald Weaver (Nat)	Fred Aarons (Ind Nat); Alfred Waterhouse (Ind Lab)
Newcastle	Peter Connolly	George Waller (Nat)	Walter Baxter (Ind)
Newtown	**Frank Burke**	William Pickup (Nat)	
North Sydney	Ben Howe	Ernest Marks (Nat)	Harry Meatheringham (Ind)
Oatley	**Mark Gosling**	James Webb (Nat)	John Gager (Ind)
Orange	William Folster	**John Fitzpatrick** (Nat)	
Oxley		Lewis Martin (Nat)	Albert Suters (Ind); John Thomson (Ind)
Paddington	William Bates	**Daniel Levy** (Nat)	
Parramatta	Alfred Warton	**Albert Bruntnell** (Nat)	
Phillip	**Michael Burke**	William Weller (Nat)	Mary Grayndler (Ind)
Raleigh	John Connolly	**Roy Vincent** (CP)	
Randwick	Jack Flanagan	Ernest Tresidder (Nat)	
Redfern	**William McKell**	Frederick Meiklejohn (Nat)	
Rockdale	Edgar Levey	**Guy Arkins** (Nat)	
Rozelle	**John Quirk**	Albert Smith (Nat)	Arthur Doughty (Const); **Cecil Murphy** (Ind Lab)
Ryde	Henry McDicken	Arthur Bridges (Nat)	Francis Pacey (Ind)
St George	**Joseph Cahill**	James Morrish (Nat)	
South Coast	Francis Riley	**Henry Bate** (Nat)	
Sturt	**Ted Horsington**	Alfred Gorrie (Nat)	
Surry Hills	Tom Shannon	William Adkins (Nat)	John Salmon (Ind)
Tamworth		**Frank Chaffey** (Nat)	Robert Levien (Ind)
Temora	David Nilon	**Hugh Main** (CP)	George Burgess (Ind Lab)
Tenterfield		**Michael Bruxner** (CP)	
Upper Hunter	James Russell	**William Cameron** (Nat)	
Vaucluse	Henrietta Greville	**William Foster** (Nat)	
Wagga Wagga	Edward Locke	**Matthew Kilpatrick** (CP)	
Wallsend	Robert Cameron		**Walter Skelton** (PLP)
Waverley	Archibald Moate	Carl Glasgow (Nat)	
Willoughby	Richard Lynch	Vernon Treatt (Nat)	**Edward Sanders** (Ind Nat)
Wollondilly	Daniel Chalker	**Sir George Fuller** (Nat)	
Wollongong	**Billy Davies**	Norman Smith (Nat)	
Woollahra	Maurice O'Sullivan	Frederick Davidson (Nat)	**Septimus Alldis** (Ind Lab)
Young	George McCarthy	Albert Reid (CP)	**Peter Loughlin** (Ind Lab)

== See also ==
- Members of the New South Wales Legislative Assembly, 1927–1930
