= Electoral results for the district of Hamilton (New South Wales) =

Election results for Hamilton, New South Wales, Australia

Hamilton, an electoral district of the Legislative Assembly in the Australian state of New South Wales had two incarnations, from 1859 until 1894 and from 1904 until 1920.

| Election | Member | Party |
|---|---|---|
| 1927 | David Murray | Labor |
| 1928 by | James Smith | Labor |
| 1930 | Hugh Connell | Labor |
| 1932 | Hugh Connell | Labor (NSW) |
| 1934 by | William Brennan | Labor (NSW) |
| 1935 | Joshua Arthur | Labor (NSW) |
| 1938 | Joshua Arthur | Labor |
| 1941 | Joshua Arthur | Labor |
| 1944 | Joshua Arthur | Labor |
| 1947 | Joshua Arthur | Labor |
| 1950 | George Campbell | Labor |
| 1953 | George Campbell | Labor |
| 1956 | George Campbell | Labor |
| 1959 | Robert McCartney | Labor |
| 1962 | Robert McCartney | Labor |
| 1965 | Robert McCartney | Labor |
| 1968 | Robert McCartney | Labor |

== Election results ==
=== Elections in the 1960s ===
==== 1968 ====
1968 New South Wales state election: Hamilton
| Party | Candidate | Votes | % | ±% |
|---|---|---|---|---|
| Labor | Robert McCartney | 12,458 | 60.1 | −4.2 |
| Liberal | James Reeves | 8,286 | 39.9 | +4.2 |
| Total formal votes | | 20,744 | 97.9 | |
| Informal votes | | 434 | 2.1 | |
| Turnout | | 21,178 | 94.3 | |
| Labor hold | | Swing | −4.2 | |

==== 1965 ====
1965 New South Wales state election: Hamilton
| Party | Candidate | Votes | % | ±% |
|---|---|---|---|---|
| Labor | Robert McCartney | 12,262 | 64.3 | +4.5 |
| Liberal | Richard Nathan | 6,805 | 35.7 | +1.0 |
| Total formal votes | | 19,067 | 98.4 | −0.1 |
| Informal votes | | 311 | 1.6 | +0.1 |
| Turnout | | 19,378 | 94.7 | 0.0 |
| Labor hold | | Swing | +3.4 | |

==== 1962 ====
1962 New South Wales state election: Hamilton
| Party | Candidate | Votes | % | ±% |
|---|---|---|---|---|
| Labor | Robert McCartney | 11,251 | 59.8 | +4.3 |
| Liberal | Alwyn Watkins | 6,538 | 34.7 | +1.0 |
| Democratic Labor | Robert Burke | 1,030 | 5.5 | −5.3 |
| Total formal votes | | 18,819 | 98.5 | |
| Informal votes | | 289 | 1.5 | |
| Turnout | | 19,108 | 94.7 | |
Two-party-preferred result
| Labor | Robert McCartney | 11,457 | 60.9 | +3.2 |
| Liberal | Alwyn Watkins | 7,362 | 39.1 | −3.2 |
| Labor hold | | Swing | +3.2 | |

=== Elections in the 1950s ===
==== 1959 ====
1959 New South Wales state election: Hamilton
| Party | Candidate | Votes | % | ±% |
|---|---|---|---|---|
| Labor | Robert McCartney | 9,937 | 55.5 | |
| Liberal | Brian O'Loughlin | 6,024 | 33.7 | |
| Democratic Labor | John Daley | 1,937 | 10.8 | |
| Total formal votes | | 17,898 | 98.1 | |
| Informal votes | | 339 | 1.9 | |
| Turnout | | 18,237 | 94.8 | |
Two-party-preferred result
| Labor | Robert McCartney | 10,324 | 57.7 | |
| Liberal | Brian O'Loughlin | 7,574 | 42.3 | |
| Labor hold | | Swing | | |

==== 1956 ====
1956 New South Wales state election: Hamilton
| Party | Candidate | Votes | % | ±% |
|---|---|---|---|---|
| Labor | George Campbell | 9,157 | 55.7 | −8.5 |
| Liberal | Horace Smith | 7,281 | 44.3 | +8.5 |
| Total formal votes | | 16,438 | 99.0 | +0.9 |
| Informal votes | | 157 | 1.0 | −0.9 |
| Turnout | | 16,595 | 94.8 | 0.0 |
| Labor hold | | Swing | −8.5 | |

==== 1953 ====
1953 New South Wales state election: Hamilton
| Party | Candidate | Votes | % | ±% |
|---|---|---|---|---|
| Labor | George Campbell | 10,884 | 64.2 | |
| Liberal | John Milne | 6,063 | 35.8 | |
| Total formal votes | | 16,947 | 98.1 | |
| Informal votes | | 327 | 1.9 | |
| Turnout | | 17,274 | 94.8 | |
| Labor hold | | Swing | | |

==== 1950 ====
1950 New South Wales state election: Hamilton
| Party | Candidate | Votes | % | ±% |
|---|---|---|---|---|
| Labor | George Campbell | 8,046 | 49.1 | |
| Liberal | Harry Quinlan | 7,026 | 42.9 | |
| Independent | Oscar Newton | 1,315 | 8.0 | |
| Total formal votes | | 16,387 | 98.8 | |
| Informal votes | | 198 | 1.2 | |
| Turnout | | 16,585 | 95.1 | |
Two-party-preferred result
| Labor | George Campbell | 8,445 | 51.5 | |
| Liberal | Harry Quinlan | 7,942 | 48.5 | |
| Labor hold | | Swing | | |

=== Elections in the 1940s ===
==== 1947 ====
1947 New South Wales state election: Hamilton
| Party | Candidate | Votes | % | ±% |
|---|---|---|---|---|
| Labor | Joshua Arthur | 13,830 | 57.6 | −19.2 |
| Liberal | Oscar Newton | 6,776 | 28.2 | +28.2 |
| Independent | Harold Scott-Daisley | 1,901 | 7.9 | +7.9 |
| Lang Labor | William Lambert | 1,512 | 6.3 | −16.9 |
| Total formal votes | | 24,019 | 98.7 | +3.2 |
| Informal votes | | 322 | 1.3 | −3.2 |
| Turnout | | 24,341 | 95.4 | +3.3 |
| Labor hold | | Swing | N/A | |

==== 1944 ====
1944 New South Wales state election: Hamilton
| Party | Candidate | Votes | % | ±% |
|---|---|---|---|---|
| Labor | Joshua Arthur | 16,562 | 76.8 | −8.1 |
| Lang Labor | William Campbell | 5,017 | 23.2 | +23.2 |
| Total formal votes | | 21,579 | 95.5 | −1.2 |
| Informal votes | | 1,007 | 4.5 | +1.2 |
| Turnout | | 22,586 | 92.1 | −2.0 |
| Labor hold | | Swing | N/A | |

==== 1941 ====
1941 New South Wales state election: Hamilton
| Party | Candidate | Votes | % | ±% |
|---|---|---|---|---|
| Labor | Joshua Arthur | 17,944 | 84.9 | |
| Independent | Arthur Clarke | 3,200 | 15.1 | |
| Total formal votes | | 21,144 | 96.7 | |
| Informal votes | | 730 | 3.3 | |
| Turnout | | 21,874 | 94.1 | |
| Labor hold | | Swing | | |

=== Elections in the 1930s ===
==== 1938 ====
1938 New South Wales state election: Hamilton
| Party | Candidate | Votes | % | ±% |
|---|---|---|---|---|
| Labor | Joshua Arthur | unopposed | | |
| Labor hold | | | | |

==== 1935 ====
1935 New South Wales state election: Hamilton
| Party | Candidate | Votes | % | ±% |
|---|---|---|---|---|
| Labor (NSW) | Joshua Arthur | 9,824 | 48.7 | −1.5 |
| United Australia | Ernest Richardson | 9,044 | 44.8 | +44.8 |
| Federal Labor | John Doyle | 1,317 | 6.5 | +6.5 |
| Total formal votes | | 20,185 | 98.3 | +0.6 |
| Informal votes | | 351 | 1.7 | −0.6 |
| Turnout | | 20,536 | 96.5 | −0.6 |
Two-party-preferred result
| Labor (NSW) | Joshua Arthur | 10,622 | 52.6 | |
| United Australia | Ernest Richardson | 9,563 | 47.4 | |
| Labor (NSW) hold | | Swing | N/A | |

==== 1934 by-election ====
1934 Hamilton by-election Saturday, 24 February
| Party | Candidate | Votes | % | ±% |
|---|---|---|---|---|
| Labor (NSW) | William Brennan | 9,391 | 51.5 | +1.3 |
| United Australia | Gordon Skelton | 7,445 | 40.8 | +13.3 |
| Communist | Sidney Bethune | 1,220 | 6.7 | +5.7 |
| Independent | William Stott | 176 | 1.0 | +1.0 |
| Total formal votes | | 18,232 | 97.2 | −0.5 |
| Informal votes | | 527 | 2.8 | +0.5 |
| Turnout | | 18,759 | 91.9 | −5.2 |
| Labor (NSW) hold | | Swing | N/A | |

- Preferences were not distributed.
- The by-election was triggered by the death of Hugh Connell, (Labor).

==== 1932 ====
1932 New South Wales state election: Hamilton
| Party | Candidate | Votes | % | ±% |
|---|---|---|---|---|
| Labor (NSW) | Hugh Connell | 9,514 | 50.2 | −19.6 |
| Independent | Gordon Skelton | 5,219 | 27.5 | +27.5 |
| All for Australia | Harold O'Neill | 3,806 | 20.1 | +20.1 |
| Independent | Robert Anderson | 241 | 1.3 | +1.3 |
| Communist | William Townsend | 185 | 1.0 | +1.0 |
| Total formal votes | | 18,965 | 97.7 | −0.3 |
| Informal votes | | 451 | 2.3 | +0.3 |
| Turnout | | 19,416 | 97.1 | +1.8 |
| Labor (NSW) hold | | Swing | N/A | |

- Preferences were not distributed.

==== 1930 ====
1930 New South Wales state election: Hamilton
| Party | Candidate | Votes | % | ±% |
|---|---|---|---|---|
| Labor | Hugh Connell | 12,860 | 69.8 | |
| Nationalist | Gordon Skelton | 5,231 | 28.4 | |
| Communist | Timothy Barry | 325 | 1.8 | |
| Total formal votes | | 18,416 | 98.0 | |
| Informal votes | | 374 | 2.0 | |
| Turnout | | 18,790 | 95.3 | |
| Labor hold | | Swing | | |

The sitting member was James Smith (Labor) who did not contest the election. Hugh Connell (Labor) was the sitting member for the abolished district of Kahibah.

=== Elections in the 1920s ===
==== 1928 by-election ====
1928 Hamilton state by-election
| Party | Candidate | Votes | % | ±% |
|---|---|---|---|---|
| Labor | James Smith | 5,851 | 48.0 | −10.6 |
| Protestant Labour | Walter Skelton | 4,851 | 38.8 | +31.5 |
| Nationalist | Henry Cornish | 1,468 | 12.0 | −8.5 |
| Independent Labor | James Iceton | 23 | 0.2 | +0.2 |
| Total formal votes | | 12,193 | 98.9 | +1.0 |
| Informal votes | | 140 | 1.1 | −1.0 |
| Turnout | | 12,333 | 70.9 | −14.1 |
Two-candidate-preferred result
| Labor | James Smith | 5,968 | 51.2 | +51.2 |
| Protestant Labour | Walter Skelton | 5,684 | 48.8 | +48.8 |
| Labor hold | | Swing | N/A | |

==== 1927 ====
1927 New South Wales state election: Hamilton
| Party | Candidate | Votes | % | ±% |
|---|---|---|---|---|
| Labor | David Murray | 8,508 | 58.6 | |
| Nationalist | Edward Sanders | 2,977 | 20.5 | |
| Independent | George Jenner | 1,750 | 12.1 | |
| Protestant Labour | James Pendlebury | 1,204 | 8.3 | |
| Independent | John Wilson | 72 | 0.5 | |
| Total formal votes | | 14,511 | 97.9 | |
| Informal votes | | 304 | 2.1 | |
| Turnout | | 14,815 | 85.0 | |
| Labor win | | (new seat) | | |
