= Electoral results for the district of Wallsend =

Election results for Wallsend, New South Wales, Australia

Wallsend, an electoral district of the Legislative Assembly in the Australian state of New South Wales, has had four incarnations, the first from 1894 to 1904, the second from 1917 to the 1920, the third from 1927 to 1930, and the fourth from 1968 to the present.

== Members ==
First incarnation (1894–1904)
Election	Member	Party
1894	David Watkins	Labour
1895	David Watkins	Labour
1898	David Watkins	Labour
1901	John Estell	Labour
Second incarnation (1913–1920)
Election	Member	Party
1913	John Estell	Labor
1917	John Estell	Labor
Third incarnation (1927–1930)
Election	Member	Party
1927	Robert Cameron	Labor
Fourth incarnation (1968–present)
Election	Member	Party
1968	Ken Booth	Labor
1971	Ken Booth	Labor
1973	Ken Booth	Labor
1976	Ken Booth	Labor
1978	Ken Booth	Labor
1981	Ken Booth	Labor
1984	Ken Booth	Labor
1988	Ken Booth	Labor
1988 by	John Mills	Labor
1991	John Mills	Labor
1995	John Mills	Labor
1999	John Mills	Labor
2003	John Mills	Labor
2007	Sonia Hornery	Labor
2011	Sonia Hornery	Labor
2015	Sonia Hornery	Labor
2019	Sonia Hornery	Labor
2023	Sonia Hornery	Labor

== Election results ==
=== Elections in the 2020s ===
==== 2023 ====
2023 New South Wales state election: Wallsend
Party	Candidate	Votes	%	±%
Labor	Sonia Hornery	33,127	63.9	+1.4
Liberal	Callum Pull	6,988	13.5	−6.5
Greens	Rebecca Watkins	5,545	10.7	+1.5
One Nation	Pietro Di Girolamo	3,532	6.8	+6.8
Animal Justice	Anna Nolan	1,088	2.1	−2.2
Independent	Joshua Starrett	811	1.6	+1.6
Sustainable Australia	Paul Akers	717	1.4	+1.4
Total formal votes		51,808	97.4	+1.0
Informal votes		1,365	2.6	−1.0
Turnout		53,173	88.4	−0.6
Two-party-preferred result
Labor	Sonia Hornery	38,043	81.8	+5.9
Liberal	Callum Pull	8,489	18.2	−5.9
Labor hold		Swing	+5.9	

=== Elections in the 2010s ===
==== 2019 ====
2019 New South Wales state election: Wallsend
Party	Candidate	Votes	%	±%
Labor	Sonia Hornery	31,998	62.31	+3.90
Liberal	Nicholas Trappett	10,458	20.37	−4.36
Greens	Sinead Francis-Coan	4,756	9.26	−1.46
Animal Justice	Toni Gundry	2,170	4.23	+4.23
Conservatives	Fiona De Vries	1,969	3.83	+3.83
Total formal votes		51,351	96.52	+0.45
Informal votes		1,851	3.48	−0.45
Turnout		53,202	90.10	−1.47
Two-party-preferred result
Labor	Sonia Hornery	35,605	75.44	+4.64
Liberal	Nicholas Trappett	11,591	24.56	−4.64
Labor hold		Swing	+4.64	

==== 2015 ====
2015 New South Wales state election: Wallsend
Party	Candidate	Votes	%	±%
Labor	Sonia Hornery	29,034	58.4	+19.5
Liberal	Hannah Eves	12,291	24.7	−2.2
Greens	Aleona Swegen	5,330	10.7	+2.2
Christian Democrats	Damien Cotton	1,706	3.4	+1.3
No Land Tax	Tony Di Cosmo	1,341	2.7	+2.7
Total formal votes		49,702	96.1	+0.4
Informal votes		2,031	3.9	−0.4
Turnout		51,733	91.6	−0.1
Two-party-preferred result
Labor	Sonia Hornery	32,124	70.8	+14.5
Liberal	Hannah Eves	13,246	29.2	−14.5
Labor hold		Swing	+14.5	

==== 2011 ====
2011 New South Wales state election: Wallsend
Party	Candidate	Votes	%	±%
Labor	Sonia Hornery	17,275	39.6	−11.5
Liberal	Chris Dolan	12,862	29.5	+4.1
Independent	Shayne Connell	6,147	14.1	+14.1
Greens	Keith Parsons	3,617	8.3	−3.9
Independent	Michael Jackson	2,013	4.6	+4.6
Christian Democrats	Andrew Weatherstone	877	2.0	−2.7
Family First	Ray Broderick	864	2.0	+2.0
Total formal votes		43,655	96.4	−0.4
Informal votes		1,620	3.6	+0.4
Turnout		45,275	94.1	
Two-party-preferred result
Labor	Sonia Hornery	20,314	56.6	−9.2
Liberal	Chris Dolan	15,574	43.4	+9.2
Labor hold		Swing	−9.2	

=== Elections in the 2000s ===
==== 2007 ====
2007 New South Wales state election: Wallsend
Party	Candidate	Votes	%	±%
Labor	Sonia Hornery	21,607	51.0	−4.4
Liberal	James Herington	10,737	25.4	+2.5
Greens	Keith Parsons	5,145	12.2	+2.7
Fishing Party	Dallas Davies	2,857	6.7	+6.7
Christian Democrats	Milton Caine	1,989	4.7	+2.0
Total formal votes		42,335	96.8	−0.3
Informal votes		1,378	3.2	+0.3
Turnout		43,713	94.2	
Two-party-preferred result
Labor	Sonia Hornery	24,690	65.8	−4.0
Liberal	James Herington	12,834	34.2	+4.0
Labor hold		Swing	−4.0	

==== 2003 ====
2003 New South Wales state election: Wallsend
Party	Candidate	Votes	%	±%
Labor	John Mills	24,935	56.8	−0.7
Liberal	David Williams	9,739	22.2	+2.7
Greens	Michael Osborne	3,854	8.8	+1.9
Independent	Di Gibson	1,684	3.8	+3.8
One Nation	Edna Phillips	1,453	3.3	−8.2
Christian Democrats	Jim Kendall	1,259	2.9	−1.2
Democrats	Sharyn Csanki	950	2.2	+2.2
Total formal votes		43,874	96.9	−0.6
Informal votes		1,381	3.1	+0.6
Turnout		45,255	94.1	
Two-party-preferred result
Labor	John Mills	27,396	70.7	−1.9
Liberal	David Williams	11,350	29.3	+1.9
Labor hold		Swing	−1.9	

=== Elections in the 1990s ===
==== 1999 ====
1999 New South Wales state election: Wallsend
Party	Candidate	Votes	%	±%
Labor	John Mills	24,424	57.5	−5.3
Liberal	Yvonne Piddington	8,265	19.5	−12.6
One Nation	Colin Thompson	4,878	11.5	+11.5
Greens	Rebecca Moroney	2,920	6.9	+1.7
Christian Democrats	David Murray	1,752	4.1	+4.1
Citizens Electoral Council	Mel Schroeder	246	0.6	+0.6
Total formal votes		42,485	97.6	+4.3
Informal votes		1,061	2.4	−4.3
Turnout		43,546	95.2	
Two-party-preferred result
Labor	John Mills	26,380	72.6	+6.2
Liberal	Yvonne Piddington	9,957	27.4	−6.2
Labor hold		Swing	+6.2	

==== 1995 ====
1995 New South Wales state election: Wallsend
Party	Candidate	Votes	%	±%
Labor	John Mills	21,454	62.5	+6.5
Liberal	Christine Nesbitt	12,881	37.5	+7.7
Total formal votes		34,335	92.6	+2.8
Informal votes		2,731	7.4	−2.8
Turnout		37,066	95.8	
Labor hold		Swing	−0.7	

==== 1991 ====
1991 New South Wales state election: Wallsend
Party	Candidate	Votes	%	±%
Labor	John Mills	17,724	56.0	−0.3
Liberal	Philip Laver	9,438	29.8	−9.0
Democrats	Judith Smyth	2,983	9.4	+9.4
Call to Australia	John Hor	1,522	4.8	+4.8
Total formal votes		31,667	89.8	−6.5
Informal votes		3,592	10.2	+6.5
Turnout		35,259	95.3	
Two-party-preferred result
Labor	John Mills	18,850	63.2	+5.0
Liberal	Philip Laver	10,970	36.8	−5.0
Labor hold		Swing	+5.0	

=== Elections in the 1980s ===
==== 1988 by-election ====
1988 Wallsend by-election Saturday 17 December
Party	Candidate	Votes	%	±%
Labor	John Mills	15,671	55.8	−3.6
Independent	Lindsay Bradley	8,485	30.2	
Independent	Paul Stocker	2,555	9.1	
Independent	Philip Laver	1,377	4.9	
Total formal votes		28,088	97.0	+1.0
Informal votes		870	3.0	−1.0
Turnout		28,958	87.7	−8.3
Two-candidate-preferred result
Labor	John Mills	17,011	63.4	+4.0
Independent	Lindsay Bradley	9,817	36.6	
Labor hold		Swing	+4.0 (Note: compared to the two-candidate-preferred result for the 1988 Wallsend election.)	

Ken Booth (Labor) died.

==== 1988 ====
1988 New South Wales state election: Wallsend
Party	Candidate	Votes	%	±%
Labor	Ken Booth	17,651	59.4	−7.1
Liberal	Peter Wilson	12,066	40.6	+8.1
Total formal votes		29,717	96.0	−1.5
Informal votes		1,232	4.0	+1.5
Turnout		30,949	96.0	
Labor hold		Swing	−7.6	

==== 1984 ====
1984 New South Wales state election: Wallsend
Party	Candidate	Votes	%	±%
Labor	Ken Booth	19,435	64.3	–10.1
Liberal	Garry Carter	10,804	35.7	+10.1
Total formal votes		30,239	97.9	+0.6
Informal votes		660	2.1	–0.6
Turnout		30,899	95.4	+0.9
Labor hold		Swing	−10.1	

==== 1981 ====
1981 New South Wales state election: Wallsend
Party	Candidate	Votes	%	±%
Labor	Ken Booth	21,392	74.3	−5.0
Liberal	Richard Noonan	7,387	25.7	+5.0
Total formal votes		28,779	97.3	
Informal votes		789	2.7	
Turnout		29,568	94.5	
Labor hold		Swing	−5.0	

=== Elections in the 1970s ===
==== 1978 ====
1978 New South Wales state election: Wallsend
Party	Candidate	Votes	%	±%
Labor	Ken Booth	28,186	79.3	+10.0
Liberal	Denise Martin	7,368	20.7	−10.0
Total formal votes		35,554	98.0	−0.4
Informal votes		723	2.0	+0.4
Turnout		36,277	95.5	−0.2
Labor hold		Swing	+10.0	

==== 1976 ====
1976 New South Wales state election: Wallsend
Party	Candidate	Votes	%	±%
Labor	Ken Booth	23,891	69.3	−2.0
Liberal	Stephen Walker	10,562	30.7	+30.7
Total formal votes		34,453	98.4	+1.6
Informal votes		553	1.6	−1.6
Turnout		35,006	95.7	0.0
Labor hold		Swing	−7.2	

==== 1973 ====
1973 New South Wales state election: Wallsend
Party	Candidate	Votes	%	±%
Labor	Ken Booth	22,602	71.3	+2.6
Democratic Labor	Robert Godfrey	5,821	18.4	+14.9
Australia	Desmond Kynaston	3,273	10.3	+10.3
Total formal votes		31,696	96.8	
Informal votes		1,044	3.2	
Turnout		32,740	95.7	
Two-candidate-preferred result
Labor	Ken Booth	24,239	76.5	+7.1
Democratic Labor	Robert Godfrey	7,457	23.5	+23.5
Labor hold		Swing	+7.1	

==== 1971 ====
1971 New South Wales state election: Wallsend
Party	Candidate	Votes	%	±%
Labor	Ken Booth	18,981	68.7	−2.1
Liberal	John Bailey	7,691	27.8	+2.0
Democratic Labor	Robert Godfrey	978	3.5	+0.1
Total formal votes		27,650	98.0	
Informal votes		558	2.0	
Turnout		28,208	95.7	
Two-party-preferred result
Labor	Ken Booth	19,177	69.4	−2.1
Liberal	John Bailey	8,473	30.6	+2.1
Labor hold		Swing	−2.1	

=== Elections in the 1960s ===
==== 1968 ====
1968 New South Wales state election: Wallsend
Party	Candidate	Votes	%	±%
Labor	Ken Booth	15,866	75.8	
Liberal	William Gilchrist	4,347	20.8	
Democratic Labor	Donald Richards	710	3.4	
Total formal votes		20,923	97.4	
Informal votes		560	2.6	
Turnout		21,483	96.2	
Two-party-preferred result
Labor	Ken Booth	16,008	76.5	
Liberal	William Gilchrist	4,915	23.5	
Labor win		(new seat)		

District re-created

==== 1930–1968 ====
District abolished District abolished

=== Elections in the 1920s ===
==== 1927 ====
1927 New South Wales state election: Wallsend
Party	Candidate	Votes	%	±%
Labor	Robert Cameron	7,668	57.8	
Protestant Labour	Walter Skelton (defeated)	5,597	42.2	
Total formal votes		13,265	99.3	
Informal votes		94	0.7	
Turnout		13,359	82.6	
Labor win		(new seat)		

District re-created

==== 1920–1927 ====
District abolished District abolished

=== Elections in the 1910s ===
==== 1917 ====
1917 New South Wales state election: Wallsend
Party	Candidate	Votes	%	±%
Labor	John Estell	unopposed		
Labor hold				

==== 1913 ====
1913 New South Wales state election: Wallsend
Party	Candidate	Votes	%	±%
Labor	John Estell	5,652	82.2	
Liberal Reform	Thomas Collins	825	12.0	
Socialist Labor	Joseph Charlton	401	5.8	
Total formal votes		6,878	97.5	
Informal votes		177	2.5	
Turnout		7,055	64.3	
Labor notional hold				

Wallesend largely replaced the abolished district of Waratah, held by John Estell (Labor).

District re-created

==== 1904–1913 ====
District abolished District abolished

=== Elections in the 1900s ===
==== 1901 ====
1901 New South Wales state election: Wallsend
Party	Candidate	Votes	%	±%
Labour	John Estell	1,560	89.4	+28.1
Socialist Labor	James Moroney	185	10.6	
Total formal votes		1,745	99.3	−0.1
Informal votes		12	0.7	+0.1
Turnout		1,757	59.2	−13.3
Labour hold				

=== Elections in the 1890s ===
==== 1898 ====
1898 New South Wales colonial election: Wallsend
Party	Candidate	Votes	%	±%
Labour	David Watkins	1,012	61.3	
National Federal	William Fletcher	639	38.7	
Total formal votes		1,651	99.5	
Informal votes		9	0.5	
Turnout		1,660	72.5	
Labour hold				

==== 1895 ====
1895 New South Wales colonial election: Wallsend
Party	Candidate	Votes	%	±%
Labour	David Watkins	988	65.2	
Protectionist	Thomas Walker	527	34.8	
Total formal votes		1,515	99.3	
Informal votes		11	0.7	
Turnout		1,526	76.5	
Labour hold				

==== 1894 ====
1894 New South Wales colonial election: Wallsend
Party	Candidate	Votes	%	±%
Labour	David Watkins	908	51.4	
Protectionist	Thomas Walker	470	26.6	
Ind. Protectionist	Oswald Steel	335	19.0	
Free Trade	Albert Card	45	2.6	
Independent	Alfred Deering	8	0.5	
Total formal votes		1,766	98.8	
Informal votes		21	1.2	
Turnout		1,787	88.6	
Labour win		(new seat)		
