= Electoral results for the district of Kurri Kurri =

Election results for Kurri Kurri, New South Wales, Australia

Kurri Kurri, an electoral district of the Legislative Assembly in the Australian state of New South Wales, was created in 1927 and abolished in 1968.

Election	Member	Party
1927	George Booth	Labor
1930	George Booth	Labor
1932	George Booth	Labor (NSW)
1935	George Booth	Labor (NSW)
1938	George Booth	Labor
1941	George Booth	Labor
1944	George Booth	Labor
1947	George Booth	Labor
1950	George Booth	Labor
1953	George Booth	Labor
1956	George Booth	Labor
1959	George Booth	Labor
1960 by	Ken Booth	Labor
1962	Ken Booth	Labor
1965	Ken Booth	Labor

== Election results ==
=== Elections in the 1960s ===
==== 1965 ====
1965 New South Wales state election: Kurri Kurri
Party	Candidate	Votes	%	±%
Labor	Ken Booth	unopposed		
Labor hold				

==== 1962 ====
1962 New South Wales state election: Kurri Kurri
Party	Candidate	Votes	%	±%
Labor	Ken Booth	unopposed		
Labor hold				

==== 1960 by-election ====
1960 Kurri Kurri by-election Saturday 8 October
Party	Candidate	Votes	%	±%
Labor	Ken Booth	17,764	92.53	
Communist	James Clark	1,434	7.47	
Total formal votes		19,198	97.28	
Informal votes		536	2.72	
Turnout		19,734	87.57	
Labor hold		Swing		

George Booth (Labor) died and was succeeded by his son Ken.

=== Elections in the 1950s ===
==== 1959 ====
1959 New South Wales state election: Kurri Kurri
Party	Candidate	Votes	%	±%
Labor	George Booth	18,147	89.9	
Communist	Charles Dumbrell	2,042	10.1	
Total formal votes		20,189	96.8	
Informal votes		675	3.2	
Turnout		20,864	95.3	
Labor hold		Swing		

==== 1956 ====
1956 New South Wales state election: Kurri Kurri
Party	Candidate	Votes	%	±%
Labor	George Booth	15,610	84.4	
Liberal	Stanley Mettam	2,897	15.6	
Total formal votes		18,507	98.5	
Informal votes		285	1.5	
Turnout		18,792	95.3	
Labor hold		Swing	N/A	

==== 1953 ====
1953 New South Wales state election: Kurri Kurri
Party	Candidate	Votes	%	±%
Labor	George Booth	unopposed		
Labor hold				

==== 1950 ====
1950 New South Wales state election: Kurri Kurri
Party	Candidate	Votes	%	±%
Labor	George Booth	14,059	90.0	
Communist	Nellie Simm	1,571	10.0	
Total formal votes		15,630	97.3	
Informal votes		437	2.7	
Turnout		16,067	95.3	
Labor hold		Swing		

=== Elections in the 1940s ===
==== 1947 ====
1947 New South Wales state election: Kurri Kurri
Party	Candidate	Votes	%	±%
Labor	George Booth	22,420	85.9	−14.1
Communist	Robert Chapman	3,688	14.1	+14.1
Total formal votes		26,108	97.1	
Informal votes		774	2.9	
Turnout		26,882	96.5	
Labor hold		Swing	N/A	

==== 1944 ====
1944 New South Wales state election: Kurri Kurri
Party	Candidate	Votes	%	±%
Labor	George Booth	unopposed		
Labor hold				

==== 1941 ====
1941 New South Wales state election: Kurri Kurri
Party	Candidate	Votes	%	±%
Labor	George Booth	unopposed		
Labor hold				

=== Elections in the 1930s ===
==== 1938 ====
1938 New South Wales state election: Kurri Kurri
Party	Candidate	Votes	%	±%
Labor	George Booth	unopposed		
Labor hold				

==== 1935 ====
1935 New South Wales state election: Kurri Kurri
Party	Candidate	Votes	%	±%
Labor (NSW)	George Booth	15,855	85.2	−3.3
Communist	Jack Miles	2,757	14.8	+3.3
Total formal votes		18,612	88.2	+5.6
Informal votes		2,353	11.2	−5.6
Turnout		20,965	96.0	−0.6
Labor (NSW) hold		Swing	−3.3	

==== 1932 ====
1932 New South Wales state election: Kurri Kurri
Party	Candidate	Votes	%	±%
Labor (NSW)	George Booth	14,064	88.5	−6.7
Communist	Harris Burnham	1,820	11.5	+6.7
Total formal votes		15,884	82.6	−9.3
Informal votes		3,338	17.4	+9.3
Turnout		19,222	96.6	+0.8
Labor (NSW) hold		Swing	−6.7	

==== 1930 ====
1930 New South Wales state election: Kurri Kurri
Party	Candidate	Votes	%	±%
Labor	George Booth	16,157	95.2	
Communist	Harris Burnham	816	4.8	
Total formal votes		16,973	91.9	
Informal votes		1,488	8.1	
Turnout		18,461	95.8	
Labor hold		Swing		

=== Elections in the 1920s ===
==== 1927 ====
1927 New South Wales state election: Kurri Kurri
Party	Candidate	Votes	%	±%
Labor	George Booth	10,162	85.1	
Independent Labor	Thomas Pearce	1,777	14.9	
Total formal votes		11,939	98.8	
Informal votes		148	1.2	
Turnout		12,087	80.9	
Labor win		(new seat)		
