= 1928 Hamilton state by-election =

- 8 September 1928

Electoral district of Hamilton in the New South Wales Legislative Assembly
- Registered: 17,398
- Turnout: 70.9% (▼14.1)
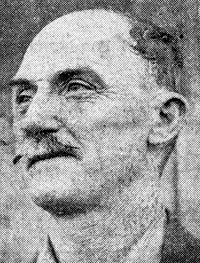

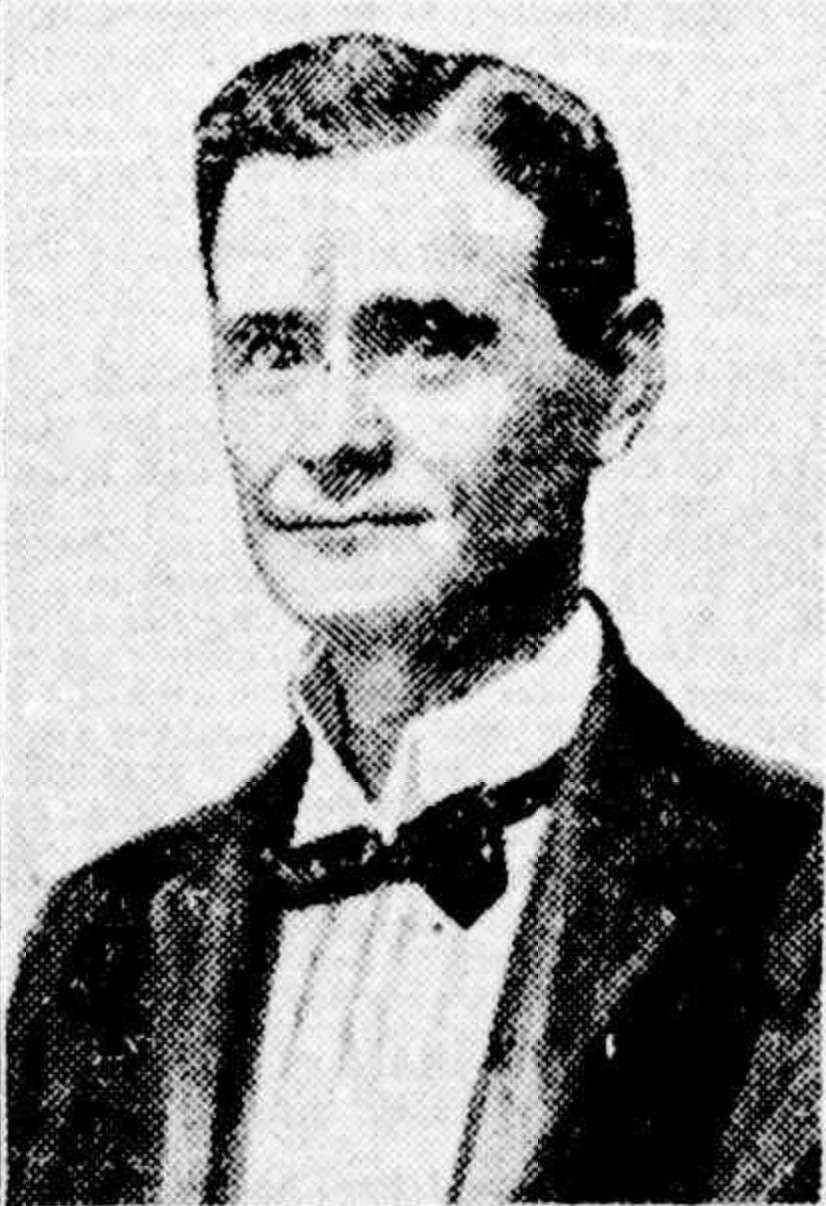
	First party	Second party
Candidate	James Smith	Walter Skelton
Party	Labor	Protestant Labour
Primary vote	5,851	4,851
Percentage	48.0%	38.8%
Swing	▼10.6	▲31.5
TCP	51.2%	48.8%
TCP swing	▲51.2	▲48.8
MP before election
David Murray
Labor
Elected MP
James Smith
Labor

The 1928 Hamilton state by-election was held on 8 September 1928 to elect the member for Hamilton in the New South Wales Legislative Assembly, following the death of Labor Party MP David Murray.

Hamilton had been won by Labor with 58.6% of the vote when it was first contested at the 1927 state election. However, Labor lost more than 10% of its vote at the by-election and only narrowly retained the seat against Protestant Independent Labour Party candidate Walter Skelton, with James Smith elected with 51.2% of the two-candidate-preferred vote. Skelton would have likely won if all Nationalist Party voters exercised their second preferences, something they were not required to do under the optional preferential voting system.

== Key events ==
- 8 May 1928 − David Murray died
- 14 August 1928 − Writ of election issued by the Speaker of the Legislative Assembly
- 21 August 1928 − Candidate nominations
- 8 September 1928 − Polling day
- 21 September 1928 − Return of writ

== Candidates ==
Party	Candidate	Background
Nationalist	Henry Cornish	Alderman on Newcastle Municipal Council and former mayor of Newcastle
Independent Labor	James Iceton	Mining check inspector who had contested Labor preselection
Protestant Labour	Walter Skelton	Former MP for Newcastle
Labor	James Smith	Bricklayer and union official

== Result ==
1928 Hamilton state by-election
Party	Candidate	Votes	%	±%
Labor	James Smith	5,851	48.0	−10.6
Protestant Labour	Walter Skelton	4,851	38.8	+31.5
Nationalist	Henry Cornish	1,468	12.0	−8.5
Independent Labor	James Iceton	23	0.2	+0.2
Total formal votes		12,193	98.9	+1.0
Informal votes		140	1.1	−1.0
Turnout		12,333	70.9	−14.1
Two-candidate-preferred result
Labor	James Smith	5,968	51.2	+51.2
Protestant Labour	Walter Skelton	5,684	48.8	+48.8
Labor hold		Swing	N/A	

== See also ==
- Electoral results for the district of Hamilton
- List of New South Wales state by-elections
