= 1934 Hamilton state by-election =

Election result for Hamilton, New South Wales, Australia

A by-election was held for the New South Wales Legislative Assembly electorate of Hamilton on 24 February 1934 because of the death of Hugh Connell, (Labor).

== Dates ==
Date	Event
31 January 1934	Hugh Connell died.
7 February 1934	Writ of election issued by the Speaker of the Legislative Assembly.
12 February 1934	Day of nomination
24 February 1934	Polling day
7 March 1934	Return of writ

== Result ==
1934 Hamilton by-election Saturday, 24 February
Party	Candidate	Votes	%	±%
Labor (NSW)	William Brennan	9,391	51.5	+1.3
United Australia	Gordon Skelton	7,445	40.8	+13.3
Communist	Sidney Bethune	1,220	6.7	+5.7
Independent	William Stott	176	1.0	+1.0
Total formal votes		18,232	97.2	−0.5
Informal votes		527	2.8	+0.5
Turnout		18,759	91.9	−5.2
Labor (NSW) hold		Swing	N/A	

- Preferences were not distributed.

== See also ==
- Electoral results for the district of Hamilton (New South Wales)
- List of New South Wales state by-elections
