= 1960 Kurri Kurri state by-election =

Election result for Kurri Kurri, New South Wales, Australia

A by-election was held for the New South Wales Legislative Assembly seat of Kurri Kurri on Saturday 8 October 1960 and was triggered by the death of George Booth (Labor).

The Temora by-election was held on the same day.

== Dates ==
Date	Event
31 July 1960	George Booth died.
12 September 1960	Writ of election issued by the Speaker of the Legislative Assembly.
19 September 1960	Nominations
8 October 1960	Polling day
28 October 1960	Return of writ

== Result ==
1960 Kurri Kurri by-election Saturday 8 October
Party	Candidate	Votes	%	±%
Labor	Ken Booth	17,764	92.53	
Communist	James Clark	1,434	7.47	
Total formal votes		19,198	97.28	
Informal votes		536	2.72	
Turnout		19,734	87.57	
Labor hold		Swing		

== See also ==
- Electoral results for the district of Kurri Kurri
- List of New South Wales state by-elections
