= 1988 Wallsend state by-election =

Election result for Wallsend, New South Wales, Australia

A by-election was held for the New South Wales Legislative Assembly electorate of Wallsend on 17 December 1988 because of the death of Ken Booth (Labor).

It was won by Labor candidate John Mills in the absence of a Liberal candidate. Mills had been Booth's preferred successor, and although several Labor ministers had lost their seats at the previous election, it was reported that due to "considerable disaffection with the ALP in the region at the last election" and multiple seats lost to independents the party was keen to see Booth elected with "as little fuss as possible". Mills won the seat against three independents with over 55% of the vote, although there was only a "modest" voter turnout of about 80%. The timing of the by-election had been unusual, just over a week before Christmas, and had been attacked by Opposition Leader Bob Carr as "unheard of" and likely to decrease turnout.

== Dates ==
Date	Event
2 November 1988	Death of Ken Booth.
30 November 1988	Writ of election issued by the Speaker of the Legislative Assembly.
7 December 1988	Nominations
17 December 1988	Polling day
6 January 1989	Return of writ

== Results ==
1988 Wallsend by-election Saturday 17 December
Party	Candidate	Votes	%	±%
Labor	John Mills	15,671	55.8	−3.6
Independent	Lindsay Bradley	8,485	30.2	
Independent	Paul Stocker	2,555	9.1	
Independent	Philip Laver	1,377	4.9	
Total formal votes		28,088	97.0	+1.0
Informal votes		870	3.0	−1.0
Turnout		28,958	87.7	−8.3
Two-candidate-preferred result
Labor	John Mills	17,011	63.4	+4.0
Independent	Lindsay Bradley	9,817	36.6	
Labor hold		Swing	+4.0 (Note: compared to the two-candidate-preferred result for the 1988 Wallsend election.)	

== See also ==
- Electoral results for the district of Wallsend
- List of New South Wales state by-elections
