= John Estell =

Australian politician (1861–1928)

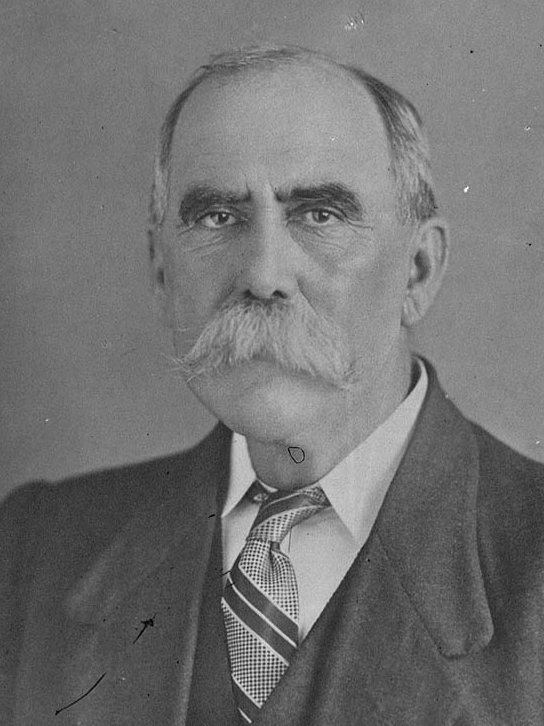
- Estell in 1915

Member of the New South Wales Legislative Council
- In office 11 April 1899 – 19 June 1901
- In office 26 April 1922 – 18 October 1928

Member of the New South Wales Legislative Assembly
- In office 3 July 1901 – 13 February 1922

Personal details
- Born: 14 October 1861 Minmi, New South Wales
- Died: 18 October 1928 (aged 67) Hamilton, New South Wales
- Party: Labor
- Spouse: Alleshia (Alicia) Jane Kirk (m. 1885)
- Children: 3 daughters 5 sons

John Estell (14 October 1861 – 18 October 1928) was a politician and coal miner in New South Wales, Australia. He was a member of the New South Wales Parliament for 29 years, including 20 years in the Legislative Assembly. He was a minister in the Holman, Storey and Dooley Labor governments.

== Early life ==
Estell was born in the Hunter Region coal mining town of Minmi. He was the son of a coal-miner and was educated to elementary level at Rydal, Wallerawang and Bathurst public schools. His initial employment was as a steam engine driver at the Minmi Colliery in 1882. He was an office-holder in the Colliery Employees Federation from 1894. He was an elected alderman on the Plattsburg Municipal Council from 1888 till 1901, serving as mayor in 1891, 1897 and 1899.

== Political career ==
The Wallsend Protection and Labour League was formed in 1891 and Estell was the president of the league. He sought pre-selection to be the Labour candidate for the Legislative Assembly seat of Wallsend at the 1894 election, but was defeated by David Watkins. On 8 April 1899, during the premiership of George Reid, Estell was appointed a member of the New South Wales Legislative Council, taking his seat on 11 April 1899. Watkins resigned in 1901 to successfully contest the first election for the federal division of Newcastle, and Estell resigned from the Legislative Council to successfully contest the 1901 election for Wallsend. The result of the 1903 New South Wales referendum was to reduce the number of members of the Legislative Assembly and Wallsend was abolished in the resulting redistribution, split between Northumberland and Waratah. Estell was pre-selected as the Labour candidate for Waratah, easily winning it at the 1904 election, retaining the seat in 1907 and 1910. Waratah was abolished in the 1912 redistribution and Wallsend re-created, which he easily won in 1913 and was unopposed in 1917.

He was the Labor whip from 1904 until April 1914 when he was appointed the Minister for Labour and Industry in the Holman Labor ministry, adding the portfolio of Minister for Mines from March 1915. He opposed conscription in World War I and during the Labor split over the issue, he remained loyal to the party, resigning from the ministry on 31 Oct 1916 due to a report that Holman would enter into a coalition with the Liberal Reform Party. Estell stated that he would not agree to direct association with his political opponents of a lifetime.

In 1920 proportional representation was introduced for elections to the Legislative Assembly, with multi-member seats. Estell was elected third of the five members for the seat of Newcastle. During the Labor premierships of John Storey and James Dooley he was the Secretary for Public Works and Minister for Railways from April 1920 till April 1922 except for the 7 hours of the first Nationalist Government of George Fuller.

Estell resigned from the Assembly on 13 February 1922 and was appointed to the Legislative Council the following day, taking his seat on 11 April 1899 and serving until his death. He did not hold any further parliamentary or ministerial office.

== Personal life and death ==
Estell married Alleshia (Alicia) Jane Kirk on 10 September 1885 and they had 8 children, 3 daughters and 5 sons. He died at Hamilton on 18 October 1928 (aged 67), survived by his wife Alicia, 3 daughters and 3 sons.

Parliament of New South Wales
Political offices
Preceded by James McGowen	Minister for Labour and Industry; 1914 – 1916	Succeeded by Henry Hoyle
Preceded by John Cann	Secretary for Mines; 1915 – 1916	Succeeded by Henry Hoyle
Preceded by Richard Ball	Secretary for Public Works and Minister for Railways; 1920 – 1921; 1921 – 1922	Succeeded by Sir Thomas Henley
Preceded by Sir Thomas Henley	Secretary for Public Works and Minister for Railways; 1920 – 1921; 1921 – 1922	Succeeded by Sir Thomas Henley
New South Wales Legislative Assembly
Preceded by David Watkins	Member for Wallsend; 1901–1904	District abolished Partly replaced by Waratah
Preceded by Matthew Charlton	Member for Waratah; 1904–1913	District abolished Partly replaced by Wallsend
New district	Member for Wallsend; 1913–1920	District abolished Absorbed by Newcastle
Preceded by Arthur Gardiner	Member for Newcastle; 1920–1922; With: Arthur Gardiner; Hugh Connell; John Fegan; William Kearsley / David Murray	Succeeded by Jack Baddeley; Walter Skelton; Magnus Cromarty; David Murray
Civic offices
Preceded by Thomas Mitchell	Mayor of Plattsburg; 1891	Succeeded by Robert Weakley
Preceded by Adam Cook	Mayor of Plattsburg; 1897	Succeeded by Oswald Steel
Preceded by Oswald Steel	Mayor of Plattsburg; 1899	Succeeded by John Hill
