= John Fegan (politician) =

Australian politician (1862–1932)

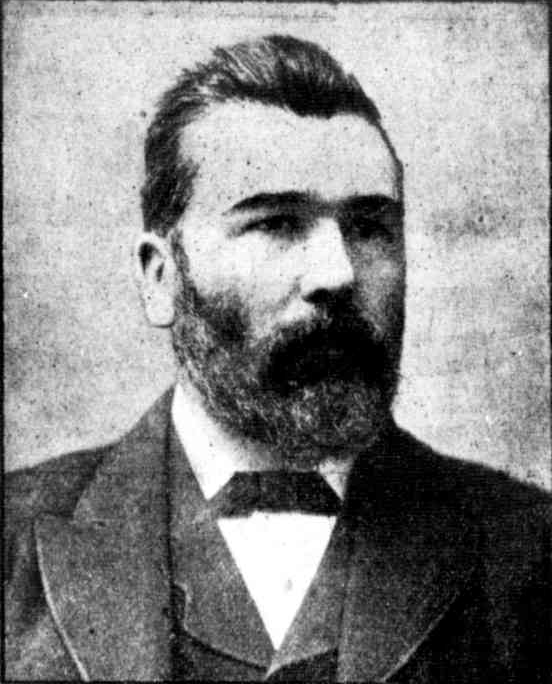

John Lionel Fegan (1862 – 29 December 1932) was a politician and coal miner in New South Wales, Australia.

Fegan was born in Chelmsford, Essex, England and worked as a coalminer in Northern Wales and Lancashire from the age of 16. He married Ann Saggerson in February 1883 and they had one daughter and one son, but he abandoned them in 1896 to travel to New South Wales. He worked as a miner in the Newcastle area and settled in Wickham. He was employed as a check inspector at Bullock Island (Carrington) colliery and became a union delegate.

He was one of the Labor Party's first members of parliament, elected in 1891 to represent the seat of Newcastle in the New South Wales Legislative Assembly. He refused to swear Labor's pledge of solidarity and in 1894 won Wickham as independent labor. He chaired a select committee on working of collieries in 1894 and served on the royal commission on city railway extension in 1897. Along with Labor, he supported George Reid's Free Trade government from 1894, but moved the motion in 1899, that brought it down.

Fegan became Secretary for Mines and Agriculture in William Lyne's Protectionist government between September 1899 and April 1901. In April 1901, he resigned his portfolio to take up Lyne's offer for him to become undersecretary in his federal home affairs department, but opposition in federal cabinet and from Reid prevented him taking up this appointment. He served as minister without portfolio in the See's government from March 1903 to June 1904. He was Minister of Public Instruction and Minister for Labour and Industry from June to August 1904 in Waddell's government. In 1901, he joined the Progressive Party and in 1907, joined the Liberal Reform Party, but was defeated for re-election by the Labor candidate, William Calman Grahame. He failed at several later election attempts, but with the introduction of proportional representation in 1920, he was elected as the only Nationalist representative along with four Labor members for Newcastle. The Nationalist party did not suggest any preference between its candidates, and Fegan was defeated, with fellow Nationalist candidate Magnus Cromarty picking up the fifth and final seat. He stood again in 1925, but was again defeated.

Fegan was a councillor on Wickham Municipal Council from 1917 until his death, and mayor in 1924 and 1931. He was a member of the Newcastle Board of Health from 1909 to 1932. In October 1897, he had married Edith Louisa Edwards, but they had no children. His son David from his first marriage joined him and was killed at Gallipoli.

He died at home in Wickham (aged 69–70).

Political offices
Parliament of New South Wales
Preceded by Joseph Cook	Secretary for Mines and Agriculture; 1899 – 1901	Succeeded by John Kidd
Preceded by John Perry	Minister of Public Instruction; Minister for Labour and Industry; June – August 1904	Succeeded by Broughton O'Conor
New South Wales Legislative Assembly
Preceded by Alexander Brown	Member for Newcastle; 1891–1894; With: William Grahame; David Scott	Succeeded by Abolished
Preceded by New district	Member for Wickham; 1894–1907	Succeeded by William C Grahame
Preceded by Arthur Gardiner	Member for Newcastle; 1920–1922; With: Hugh Connell; John Estell; Arthur Gardiner; William Kearsley / David Murray	Succeeded by Magnus Cromarty
