= William Kearsley =

Australian politician

Personal details
- Born: 2 September 1863 Stafford, England
- Died: 19 June 1921 (aged 57) Granville, New South Wales
- Party: Labor Party

William Kearsley (2 September 1863 – 19 June 1921) was an Australian politician and member of the New South Wales Legislative Assembly from 1910 until 1921. He was a member of the Labor Party (ALP).

Kearsley was born in Stafford, England. He was educated to be a Methodist minister and emigrated to the northern New South Wales coal fields in 1888. After an initially career as a preacher he became a coal miner and was elected as an official in the miners' union in 1907. He was elected unopposed to the seat of Northumberland at a by-election caused by the resignation of Matthew Charlton who contested the seat of Hunter at the 1910 federal election. He retained the seat of Northumberland until it was abolished at the 1913 state election. He was then elected to the seat of Cessnock and retained it until the introduction of multi-member seats and proportional representation at the 1920 state election . Kearsley was one of five members elected for the seat of Newcastle at the subsequent election. He died in the following year and was replaced by David Murray. He did not hold ministerial or party office.

New South Wales Legislative Assembly
Preceded by Matthew Charlton	Member for Northumberland; 1910 – 1913	Succeeded by Abolished
Preceded by New Seat	Member for Cessnock; 1913 – 1920	Succeeded by Abolished
Preceded by Arthur Gardiner	Member for Newcastle; 1920 – 1921; Served alongside: Connell, Estell, Gardiner, Fegan	Succeeded by David Murray
