= Magnus Cromarty =

Australian politician

Magnus Cromarty (1875 – 30 August 1925) was an Australian politician.

Cromarty was born in Anna Bay, New South Wales and initially attended Anna Bay Public School, but went to Newcastle to reside with his sister aged 11 and was then educated at Newcastle High School. After leaving school, he worked as a clerk for the Union Steamship Company and Caledonian Collieries Ltd. He later became a public accountant with a successful practice, Cromarty and Turner, and served as auditor for several local councils, including the Gloucester Shire, Municipality of Raymond Terrace and the Port Stephens Shire. He was an unsuccessful Liberal Reform Party candidate at the 1913 state election.

He was elected as a Nationalist Party member for the multi-member seat of Newcastle in the New South Wales Legislative Assembly in 1922. He was defeated at the 1925 election.

Cromarty died suddenly at his home in the Newcastle suburb of Merewether in August 1925, only three months after his parliamentary defeat. He was buried at the Anna Bay Cemetery.

== Notes ==
New South Wales Legislative Assembly
Preceded by John Fegan	Member for Newcastle; 1922–1925; Served alongside: Baddeley, Connell, Murray, Skelton	Succeeded by George Booth
