= William Brennan (Australian politician) =

Australian politician

Personal details
- Born: 10 September 1865 Wallsend, Colony of New South Wales
- Died: 8 October 1937 (aged 72) Waratah, New South Wales, Australia
- Party: Labor Party

William Edward Brennan (10 September 1863 – 8 October 1937) was an Australian politician. He was a member of the New South Wales Legislative Council between 1925 and 1934 and a member of the New South Wales Legislative Assembly from 1934 until 1935. He was a member of the Labor Party (ALP).

Brennan was born and educated to elementary level in Wallsend, New South Wales. At age 14, he commenced work as a coal-miner at Wallsend Colliery. He was an office-holder in the Colliery Employees Federation from 1903 and in 1909, after leading a strike, he was convicted of conspiracy under the Master and Servant Act and goaled at Bathurst for 3 months. In 1925, after a number of unsuccessful attempts to win the seat of Maitland, Brennan was granted a life appointment to the New South Wales Legislative Council. Brennan resigned this appointment to contest the seat of Hamilton at a by-election caused by the death of Hugh Connell in 1934. At the 1935 election he stood aside to allow the ALP to endorse Joshua Arthur. He did not hold ministerial or party office.

New South Wales Legislative Assembly
Preceded by Hugh Connell	Member for Hamilton; 1934 – 1935	Succeeded by Joshua Arthur
