= Sonia Hornery =

Australian politician

Sonia Hornery MP
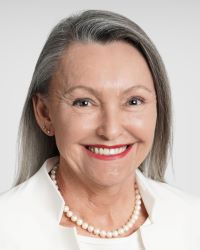

6th Deputy Speaker of the Legislative Assembly
- Incumbent
- Assumed office 9 May 2023
- Speaker: Greg Piper
- Preceded by: Leslie Williams

Member of the New South Wales Legislative Assembly for Wallsend
- Incumbent
- Assumed office 24 March 2007
- Preceded by: John Mills

Personal details
- Born: Sonia Kathleen Hornery; 4 December 1961 (age 64) Waratah, New South Wales, Australia
- Party: Labor Party
- Education: University of Newcastle
- Occupation: Teacher
- Website: soniahornery.com.au

Sonia Kathleen Hornery (born 4 December 1961) is an Australian politician representing the seat of Wallsend in the New South Wales Legislative Assembly for the Labor Party. She has been in Parliament since 24 March 2007 and was elected as Deputy Speaker in May 2023.

== Early life ==
Hornery grew up in Windale and Edgeworth living in Housing Commission housing, before moving to rented accommodation in Wallsend and West Wallsend.

She attended Newcastle University and studied a Diploma in Teaching. She later returned and obtained a Bachelor of Arts, with Honours, in history.

Her first teaching appointment was to Walgett High School. She then taught at Kempsey High School and other schools around the Hunter Region.

In 2002 she was elected to the City of Newcastle Council. Was a Union representative of the Teachers Federation and member of ASU.

== Parliamentary career ==
She was elected to the New South Wales Parliament in 2007. On 8 May 2007 she was appointed parliamentary secretary assisting the Minister for Transport but was demoted on 16 November 2009 as a parliamentary secretary, for opposing the Premier Nathan Rees on privatisation of public owned assets in her electorate, and campaigning within the Labor Party caucus to replace Nathan Rees as Premier of New South Wales.

In 2022 Sonia called on the then NSW Health Minister to address concerns of medical professionals at John Hunter Hospital which due concern over the at the time standards of Hunter New England Health (HNEH) and working conditions of staff.

On 26 July 2017, the New South Wales Electoral Commission announced it had laid a charge against Hornery for using electoral information in a manner contrary to that permitted under section 42(1) of the Parliamentary Electorates and Elections Act 1912, however the charge was withdrawn on 25 September 2017.

New South Wales Legislative Assembly
Preceded by John Mills	Member for Wallsend; 2007–present	Incumbent
