= Arthur Gardiner (politician) =

Australian politician

Arthur Rowland Gardiner (14 March 1876 – 11 February 1948) was an Australian politician.

Gardiner was born in Windsor, New South Wales and educated at Windsor and Sydney Superior public schools and Sydney Teachers' College (now part of the University of Sydney). He was a state school teacher from 1893 until 1903 at Sydney-area schools and from 1903 until 1910 in the Newcastle area. He was the ALP member for Newcastle in the New South Wales Legislative Assembly from 1910 to 1916, when he left the party on the conscription issue. He then represented Newcastle as a "Labor Independent" and "independent" member until 1922. He stood as a Nationalist candidate in the state elections of 1927 and 1930. He married Maud Lois Christmas at St Clements in Marrickville on 22 July 1920 and died in the Sydney suburb of Earlwood.

== Notes ==
New South Wales Legislative Assembly
Preceded by Owen Gilbert	Member for Newcastle; 1910 – 1922; Served alongside: Connell, Estell, Fegan, Kearsley/Murray	Succeeded by Walter Skelton
