= James Smith (New South Wales politician) =

Australian politician

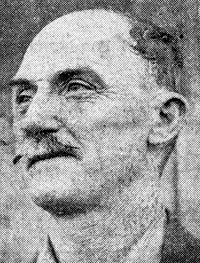

Personal details
- Born: 1 January 1887 Wentworth, New South Wales
- Died: 2 November 1962 (aged 75) New Lambton, New South Wales
- Party: Labor Party

James Edward Smith (1 January 1887 – 2 November 1962) was an Australian politician and member of the New South Wales Legislative Assembly from 1928 until 1930. He was a member of the Labor Party (ALP).

Smith was born in Wentworth, New South Wales and became a master bricklayer. He settled in Newcastle in 1920 and joined the ALP in 1922 after becoming an official of the Building Workers Industrial Union. Smith was elected to the seat of Hamilton at a by-election caused by the death of David Murray in 1928. At the 1930 election he stood aside to allow the ALP to endorse Hugh Connell whose seat of Kahibah had been abolished in a redistribution. He did not hold ministerial or party office. Smith later served as an alderman on the Newcastle City Council.

New South Wales Legislative Assembly
Preceded by David Murray	Member for Hamilton; 1928 – 1930	Succeeded by Hugh Connell
