= John Mills (Australian politician) =

Australian politician

Member of the New South Wales Parliament for Wallsend
- In office 17 December 1988 – 2 March 2007
- Preceded by: Ken Booth
- Succeeded by: Sonia Hornery

Personal details
- Born: 28 November 1941 (age 83)
- Political party: Labor Party
- Occupation: Industrial chemist

John Charles Mills (born 28 November 1941) is an Australian politician who represented Wallsend in the New South Wales Legislative Assembly for the Labor Party from 1988 to 2007.

Mills was awarded a Bachelor of Science (Hons), and a Master of Science. He was a previously an industrial chemist with BHP. He is married with two children. He represented Wallsend for the Labor Party from 1988 to 2007.

== Notes ==
New South Wales Legislative Assembly
Preceded by Ken Booth	Member for Wallsend; 1988–2007	Succeeded by Sonia Hornery
