= Peter Connolly (New South Wales politician) =

Australian politician

Peter Connolly (8 May 1890 – 27 October 1959) was an Australian politician.

Connolly was born in Newcastle upon Tyne, England, and was elected as the Labor Party member for the seat of Newcastle in the New South Wales Legislative Assembly from 1927 to 1935. He died in Newcastle.

== Notes ==
New South Wales Legislative Assembly
Preceded by Jack Baddeley; George Booth; Hugh Connell; David Murray; Walter Skelton	Member for Newcastle; 1927–1935	Succeeded by Frank Hawkins
