= Ken Booth (politician) =

Australian politician (1926–1988)

Ken Booth The Honourable

Treasurer of New South Wales
- In office 2 October 1981 – 25 March 1988
- Premier: Neville Wran; Barrie Unsworth
- Preceded by: Neville Wran
- Succeeded by: Nick Greiner

Minister for Sport and Recreation and Minister for Tourism
- In office 14 May 1976 – 2 October 1981
- Premier: Neville Wran
- Preceded by: David Arblaster
- Succeeded by: Michael Cleary

Member of the New South Wales Parliament for Wallsend
- In office 24 February 1968 – 1 November 1988
- Preceded by: New district
- Succeeded by: John Mills

Member of the New South Wales Parliament for Kurri Kurri
- In office 8 October 1960 – 23 January 1968
- Preceded by: George Booth
- Succeeded by: District abolished

Personal details
- Born: 23 February 1926 Kurri Kurri, New South Wales
- Died: 1 November 1988 (aged 62) Newcastle, New South Wales
- Party: Labor Party
- Spouse(s): Irene Marshall (1954–79); Gail Mathieson (1982–88)
- Children: 1
- Parent: George Booth (father)

Kenneth George Booth (23 February 1926 – 1 November 1988) was a New South Wales politician, Treasurer, and Minister of the Crown in the cabinets of Neville Wran and Barrie Unsworth. From 1981 to 1988 he was the Treasurer of New South Wales. He was a member of the New South Wales Legislative Assembly for 28 years from 8 October 1960 until his death on 1 November 1988 for the Labor Party, representing the seats of Kurri Kurri and Wallsend.

== Early life ==
Ken Booth was born in 1926 in Kurri Kurri, New South Wales, the son of Labor Member of the New South Wales Legislative Assembly since 1925, George Booth, and Annie Elizabeth Booth (née Payne). Booth was educated at Kurri Kurri Public School and Maitland Boys' High School. He later credited his experiences during the Great Depression as formulaic for his left-wing ideas. At age 17, he joined the Labor Party. Booth trained to be a physical education teacher at the Armidale and Sydney Teachers College, gaining a Diploma in Physical Education (DipPhysEd) in 1946.

After teaching at Cessnock High School from 1947 to 1949, he worked in physical education at the Murrumbidgee area office in Wagga Wagga. In 1951 he lectured at Sydney Teachers College and at Newcastle Technical and Newcastle University colleges until 1960. On 23 January 1954 he married Irene Marshall, also a teacher, at Christ Church Cathedral in Newcastle. Together they had a daughter, Christine. An avid sportsman, Booth enjoyed swimming, walking rugby league, basketball, was Secretary of the Newcastle Cricket Association from 1958 to 1960 and a delegate to the New South Wales Cricket Association.

== Political career ==
When his father died, Booth won ALP pre-selection for his father's then-vacant seat of Kurri Kurri. At the resulting by-election on 8 October 1960, Booth was elected with 92.53% of the vote against a single Communist candidate. He was elected a further two times, in 1962 and 1965, but was elected uncontested as a candidate. He retained this seat until it was abolished in a redistribution prior to the 1968 election. Booth subsequently contested and won the recreated seat of Wallsend, gaining 75.83% of the vote. He would hold this seat through seven more elections in 1971, 1973, 1976, 1978, 1981, 1984 and 1988.

Originally serving in the backbenches, with the election of Neville Wran as Leader of the party he was given the post of Shadow Minister for Education from 13 December 1973 to 14 May 1976. Following the Labor victory at the 1976 election, Booth, a prominent member of the Socialist Left faction of the New South Wales Labor, was sworn in as Minister of the Crown, serving as the Minister for Sport and Recreation and Minister for Tourism. He served on the Councils of the University of New South Wales from 1962 to 1965, Newcastle University College and its successor, Newcastle University from 1963 to 1974.

As Minister for sports, he implemented a capital grants program and became popular among sporting organisations throughout NSW. On 13 August 1979, over a year after their 25th wedding anniversary, his wife Irene died from cancer, aged 47. On 29 February 1980 he was appointed Assistant Treasurer whilst retaining his other portfolios. Held these offices until 2 October 1981 when he was appointed as the Treasurer of New South Wales. As Treasurer, Booth introduced significant reforms, including program budgeting and reorganisation of the parliamentary public accounts committee, embodied in the Public Finance and Audit Act 1983 (NSW).

== Later career ==
On 21 February 1982 Booth remarried to Gail Mathieson, an office executive, in Redfern. When his good friend and fellow left-faction member, Jack Ferguson, retired as Deputy Premier and Leader, Ferguson recommended Booth as his preferred successor, however, following some opposition from within the left faction, Booth lost the ballot to Ron Mulock. He remained as Treasurer until the defeat of the Unsworth Labor government at the state election in March 1988. In opposition Booth was appointed by the new Leader, Bob Carr, as Shadow Minister for Energy and Shadow Minister for Mineral Resources from 11 April 1988. He was accused by the new Minister for Administrative Services, Matt Singleton, of interfering, as Treasurer, with a Government office accommodation deal that resulted in $350,000 in dead rent. The unsubstantiated allegations infuriated the ALP Opposition and Booth was supported by Opposition Leader, Bob Carr. A subsequent Police inquiry cleared Booth of any wrongdoing. Booth however, did not live to see his name cleared. He died in office, survived by his daughter and his second wife, of a myocardial infarction on 1 November 1988 at his home and was cremated.

New South Wales Legislative Assembly
Preceded by George Booth	Member for Kurri Kurri; 1960–1968	District abolished
New district	Member for Wallsend; 1968–1988	Succeeded by John Mills
Political offices
Preceded by David Arblaster as Minister for Culture, Sport and Recreation and Minister for Tourism	Minister for Sport and Recreation; 1976–1981	Succeeded by Michael Cleary
Preceded by David Arblaster as Minister for Culture, Sport and Recreation and Minister for Tourism	Minister for Tourism; 1976–1981	Succeeded by Michael Cleary
Vacant Title last held by Max Ruddock	Assistant Treasurer of New South Wales; 1980–1981	Vacant Title next held by Phillip Smiles
Preceded by Neville Wran	Treasurer of New South Wales; 1981–1988	Succeeded by Nick Greiner
