= 1927 New South Wales state election =

State election for New South Wales, Australia in October 1927

- 8 October 1927

All 90 seats in the New South Wales Legislative Assembly 46 Assembly seats were needed for a majority
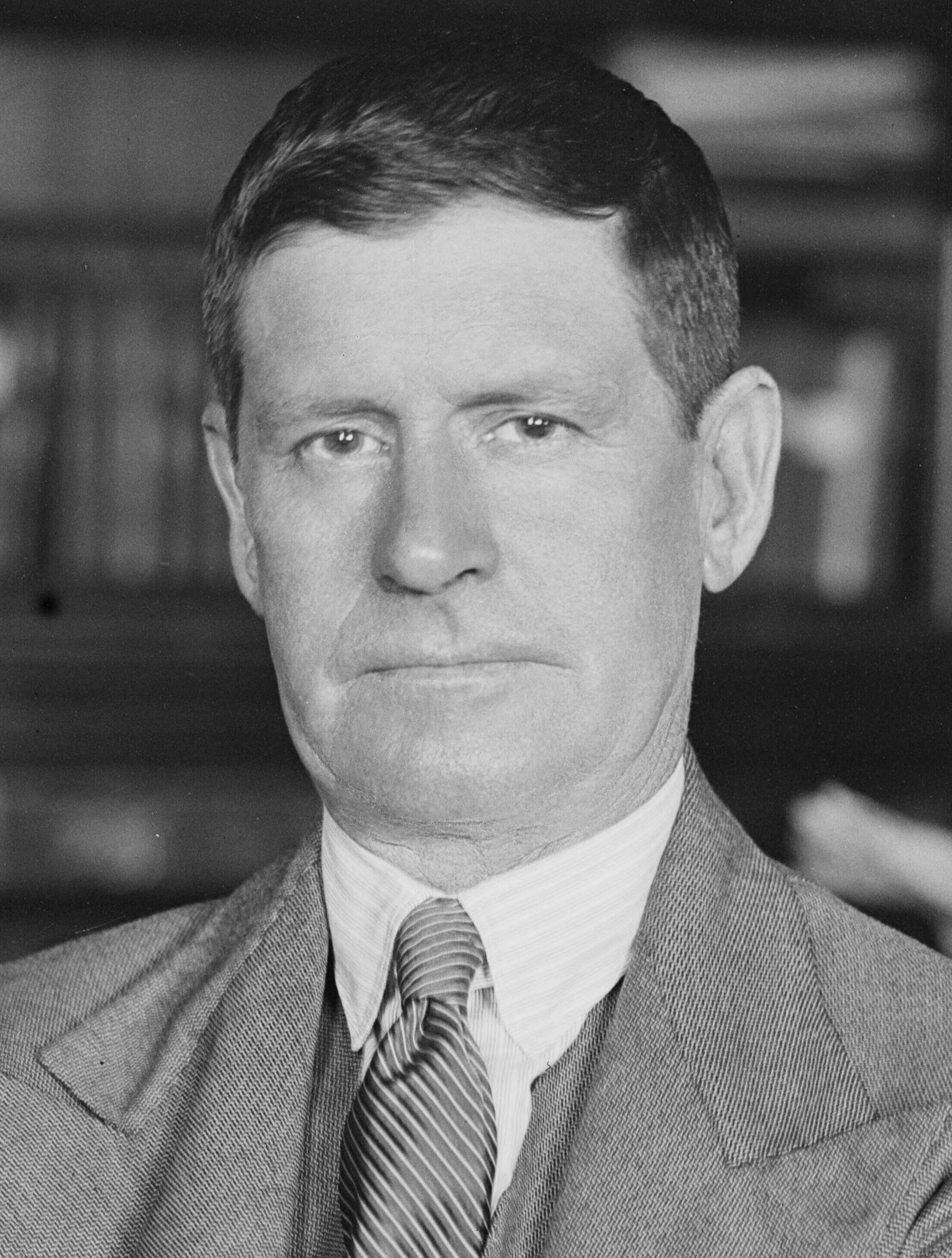

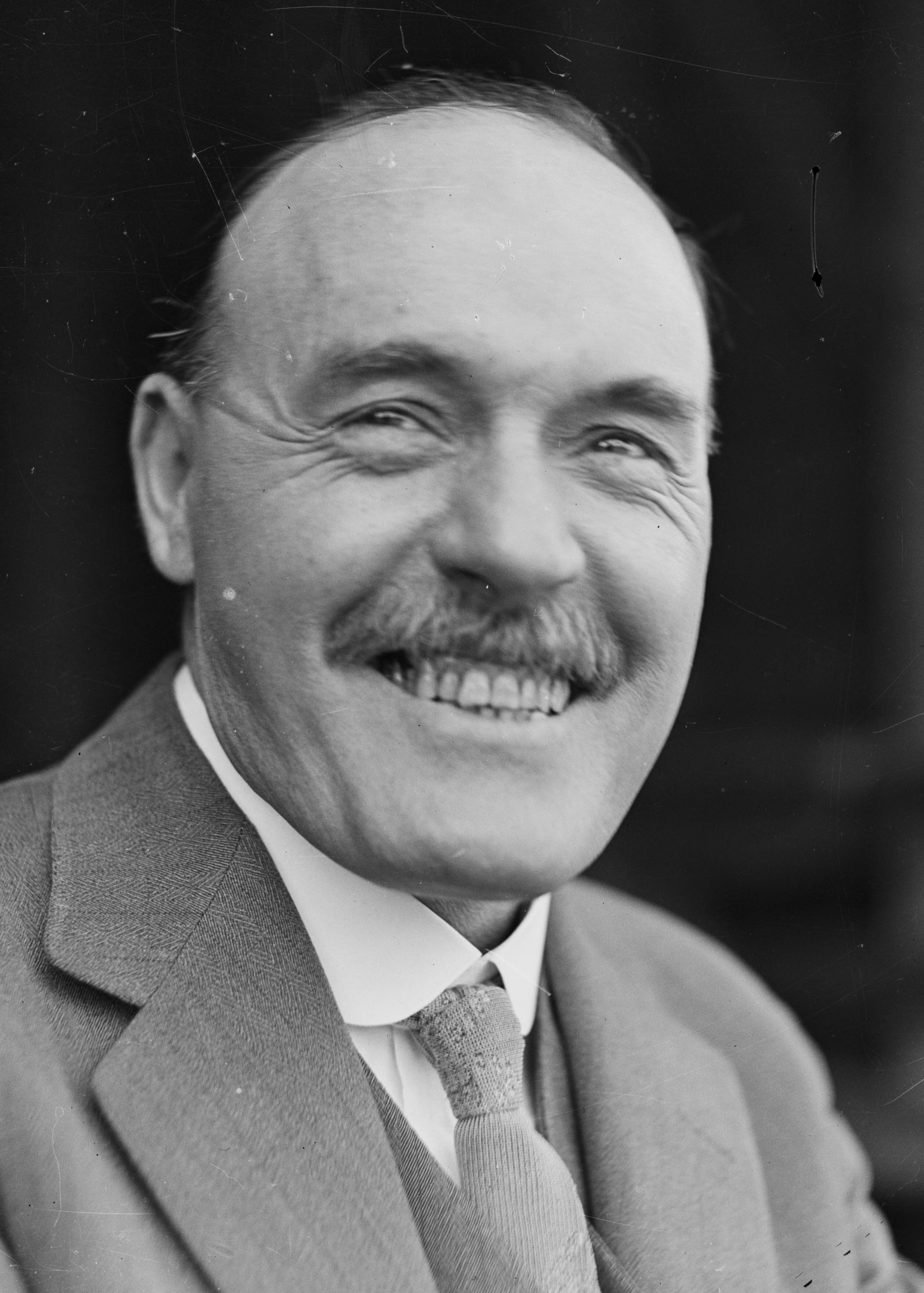
	First party	Second party
Leader	Thomas Bavin	Jack Lang
Party	Nationalist/Country coalition	Labor
Leader since	24 September 1925	31 July 1923
Leader's seat	Gordon	Auburn
Last election	41 seats	46 seats
Seats won	46 seats	40 seats
Seat change	▲5	▼6
Percentage	47.3%	43.0%
Swing	▼1.3	▼3.0
- Two-candidate-preferred margin by electorate
Premier before election
Jack Lang
Labor
Elected Premier
Thomas Bavin
Nationalist/Country coalition

The 1927 New South Wales state election to elect the 90 members of the 28th Legislative Assembly was held on 8 October 1927. During the previous parliament the voting system, Single transferable voting, a form of proportional representation with multi-member seats (modified Hare-Clark), had been changed to single member constituencies and Instant-runoff voting (optional preferential voting).

Severe divisions occurred within the Labor Party caucus in the four months prior to the election (see Lang Labor). A caretaker government composed of the supporters of the Premier of New South Wales and party leader, Jack Lang was in power at the time of the election.

As a result of the election the Lang government was defeated and a Nationalist/Country Party coalition government led by Thomas Bavin and Ernest Buttenshaw was formed with a parliamentary majority of 1 and the usual support of the 2 Nationalist independents. The Parliament first met on 3 November 1927, and ran its maximum term of 3 years. Lang remained the leader of the Labor Party throughout the Parliament.

To date Lang is the only elected Labor Premier to be voted out of office. Subsequent Labor Premiers who has lost office were all non-elected.

== Key dates ==
Date	Event
7 September 1927	The Legislative Assembly was dissolved, and writs were issued by the Governor to proceed with an election.
14 September 1927	Nominations for candidates for the election closed at noon.
8 October 1927	Polling day.
18 October 1927	Bavin ministry sworn in
29 October 1927	The writs were returned and the results formally declared.
3 November 1927	Opening of 28th Parliament.

== Results ==
New South Wales state election, 29 October 1927 Legislative Assembly << 1925–1930 >>
Enrolled voters	1,394,254 (Note: There were 1,409,493 enrolled voters, but 15,239 were enrolled in Tenterfield which was uncontested.)				
Votes cast	1,150,767		Turnout	82.54	+13.47
Informal votes	15,086		Informal	1.31	–2.06
Summary of votes by party
Party	Primary votes	%	Swing	Seats	Change
Labor	488,306	43.00	–2.99	40	–6
Nationalist	437,050	38.48	+1.41	33	+1
Country	100,963	8.89	–2.58	13	+4
Independent Labor	32,217	2.84	+2.58	2	+2
Ind. Nationalist	30,061	2.65	+2.06	2	+1
Protestant Labour	7,264	0.64	–1.47	0	–1
Independent Country	4,316	0.38	+0.38	0	±0
Independents	35,504	3.13	+1.02	0	–1 (Note: Alick Kay (Independent), a member for North Shore, resigned in 1926 and was replaced by Arthur Tonge (Labor))
Total	1,135,681			90	

Popular vote
Labor	43.00%
Nationalist	38.48%
Country	8.89%
Ind. Labor	2.84%
Ind. Nationalist	2.65%
Others	4.15%
Parliamentary seats
Labor	40
Nationalist	33
Country	13
Ind. Labor	2
Ind. Nationalist	2

== Changing seats ==
1925 election				1927 election		
Old Electorate	Member	Party	Note	New Electorate	New Member	Party
Balmain	H. V. Evatt	Labor	Changed party	Balmain	H. V. Evatt	Ind Labor
Balmain	Albert Lane	Nationalist	Defeated	Leichhardt	Barney Olde	Labor
Balmain	James Dooley	Labor	Retired	Hartley	Hamilton Knight	Labor
Botany	Thomas Mutch	Labor	Changed party	Botany	Thomas Mutch	Ind Labor
Botany				Enmore	Joe Lamaro	Labor
Byron	Robert Gillies	Labor / Independent	Defeated as Ind Labor	Byron	Arthur Budd	Country
Byron	Frederick Stuart	Progressive	Defeated as Ind Country	Byron		
Byron				Clarence	Alfred Pollack	Country
Cootamundra	Peter Loughlin	Labor / Independent	Defeated as Ind Labor	Young	Albert Reid	Country
Eastern Suburbs	Harold Jaques	Nationalist	Changed party	Bondi	Harold Jaques	Ind. Nationalist
Eastern Suburbs	Millicent Preston-Stanley	Nationalist	Defeated	Bondi		
Eastern Suburbs	Bob O'Halloran	Labor	Retired	Coogee	Hyman Goldstein	Nationalist
Eastern Suburbs				Randwick	Ernest Tresidder	Nationalist
Eastern Suburbs				Waverley	Carl Glasgow	Nationalist
Eastern Suburbs	Septimus Alldis	Labor	Defeated as Ind Labor	Woollahra	Maurice O'Sullivan	Labor
Goulburn	Paddy Stokes	Labor	Defeated	Monaro	William Hedges	Country
Murray	Vern Goodin	Labor / Independent	Defeated as Ind Labor	Albury	John Ross	Nationalist
Newcastle				Newcastle	Peter Connolly	Labor
Newcastle	Walter Skelton	Protestant Labour	Defeated	Wallsend	Robert Cameron	Labor
North Shore	Alick Kay	Independent	Resigned	Lane Cove	Bryce Walmsley	Nationalist
North Shore				Neutral Bay	Reginald Weaver	Nationalist
North Shore	William Fell	Ind. Nationalist	Retired	North Sydney	Ernest Marks	Nationalist
North Shore	Cecil Murphy	Labor	Defeated as Ind Labor	Rozelle		
North Shore	Edward Sanders	Nationalist	Changed party	Willoughby	Edward Sanders	Ind. Nationalist
Northern Tablelands	Alfred McClelland	Labor	Defeated	Armidale		
Oxley	Theodore Hill	Nationalist	Retired	Oxley	Lewis Martin	Nationalist
Oxley	Joseph Fitzgerald	Labor	Retired			
Ryde	Robert Greig	Labor	Retired	Ryde	Henry McDicken	Labor
St George				Canterbury	Arthur Tonge	Labor
St George	William Bagnall	Nationalist	Retired	Hurstville	Walter Butler	Labor
St George	George Cann	Labor	Defeated as Ind Labor	Lakemba	Fred Stanley	Labor
Sturt	Brian Doe	Nationalist	Defeated	Illawarra		
Sydney	Patrick Minahan	Labor	Defeated as Ind Labor	Auburn		
Sydney	William Holdsworth	Labor	Retired	King	Daniel Clyne	Labor
Sydney				Surry Hills	Tom Shannon	Labor
Wammerawa	Joseph Clark	Labor	Defeated	Castlereagh		
Wammerawa				Liverpool Plains	Harry Carter	Country
Western Suburbs	Edward McTiernan	Labor	Retired	Croydon	Bertram Stevens	Nationalist
Western Suburbs	Tom Hoskins	Nationalist	Defeated as Ind. Nationalist	Dulwich Hill		

== See also ==
- Candidates of the 1927 New South Wales state election
- Members of the New South Wales Legislative Assembly, 1927–1930
