= John Ross (New South Wales politician) =

Australian politician

John Ross OBE (1 September 1891 – 5 October 1973) was an Australian politician, elected as a member of the New South Wales Legislative Assembly for the seat of Albury. He was a member of the Nationalist Party of Australia.

Ross was made an Officer of the Order of the British Empire in 1959. His daughter Dorothy would be the first national president of the Country Women's Association.

== Notes ==
New South Wales Legislative Assembly
Preceded by New seat	Member for Albury; 1927 – 1930	Succeeded by Joseph Fitzgerald
