= Walter Skelton =

Australian politician

Walter Skelton MBE
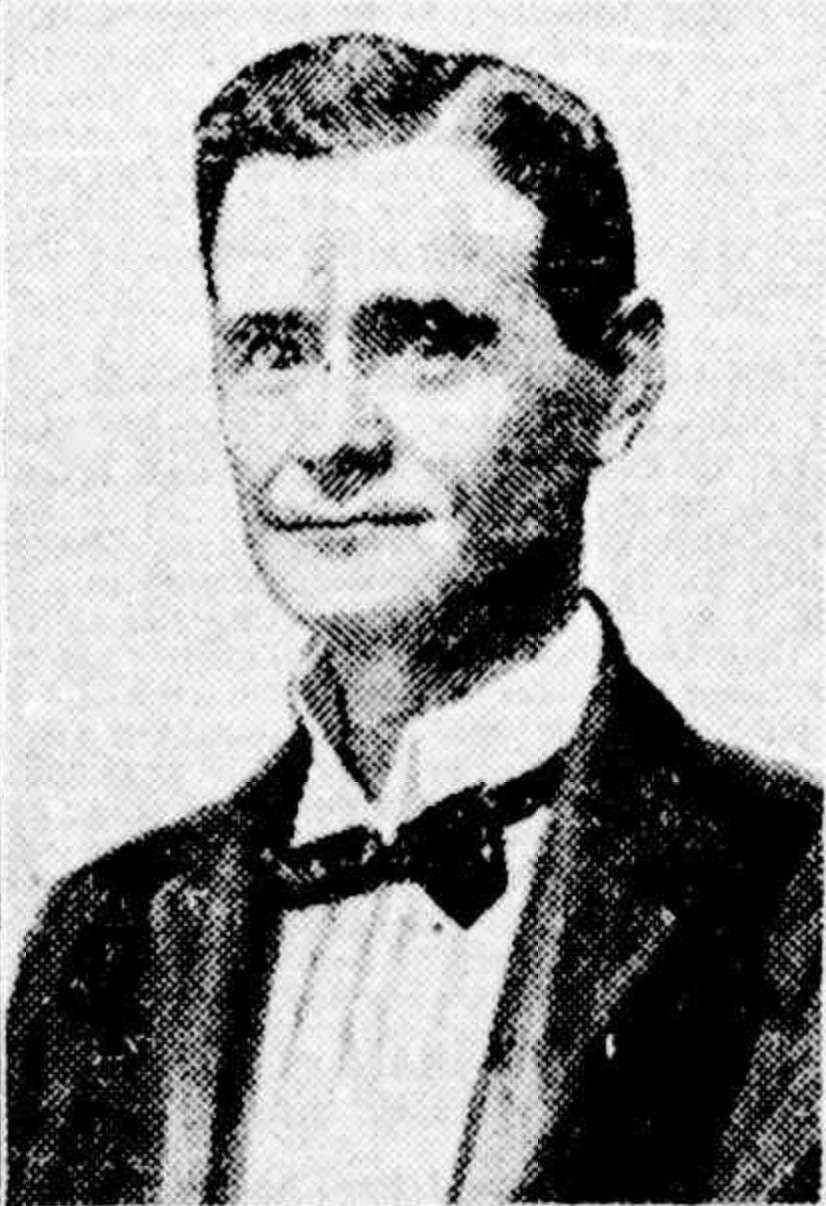

General Secretary of the National Union of Railwaymen
- In office 16 March 1932 – May 1935
- Preceded by: Position established
- Succeeded by: W. Fletcher

Member of the New South Wales Legislative Assembly for Newcastle
- In office 25 March 1922 – 7 September 1927
- Preceded by: Arthur Gardiner
- Succeeded by: Peter Connolly

Personal details
- Born: Walter Peden Joyce Skelton; 28 March 1883 Boggabri, New South Wales Colony, British Empire
- Died: 21 May 1979 (aged 96) Wollstonecraft, Sydney, New South Wales, Australia
- Party: Protestant Labour
- Other political affiliations: Independent
- Spouses: Annie Gray; Alexie Stewart
- Children: 4
- Parents: John Skelton; Margaret Seckold
- Education: Boggabri Public School
- Occupation: Railway officer; politician

Walter Peden Joyce Skelton MBE (28 March 1883 – 21 May 1979) was an Australian politician, elected as a member of the New South Wales Legislative Assembly.

Skelton was born in Boggabri, New South Wales, ninth child of a railway fettler, educated at Boggabri Public School and brought up as a strict Protestant. In 1898 he joined New South Wales Government Railways and in October 1904 he married Annie Porter Gray and they had a son and four daughters. He became a stationmaster in 1908 and worked at Matong, Jerilderie, Boggabri, Carrathool and Cockle Creek. His wife died in 1912 and he married Alexie Muriel Stewart in 1916 and they had three daughters and three sons.

Skelton and fellow members of the New South Wales Protestant Federation reacted strongly to the alleged kidnapping of an "escaped" nun Sister Mary Liguori in Sydney in 1921 and Skelton created the Protestant Independent Labour Party. In 1922, he was elected first of five members, receiving 25.19% of the vote, for the seat of Newcastle. In parliament, he campaigned for free education, prohibition by referendum and the interests of railway workers. He was re-elected in 1925. With the abolition of proportional representation in 1927, he stood as a candidate for the single-member electorates of Wallsend, but was defeated by the Labor candidate, receiving 42.19% of the vote. Skelton stood again for the 1928 Hamilton by-election but was again defeated by the Labor candidate, receiving 48.78% of the vote after the distribution of preferences. He was also unsuccessful in standing for the federal seat of Newcastle in 1928 and 1931.

Skelton helped to establish the National Union of Railwaymen of Australia, a dissident union drawing together members of smaller unions formed by rail workers who had been expelled from the Australian Railways Union for strike-breaking during the 1917 rail strike.

He died in the Sydney suburb of Greenwich, survived by his wife and their three sons and three daughters and two daughters from his first marriage.

== Honours ==
Skelton was made a Member of the Most Excellent Order of the British Empire in 1962 and named "Senior Citizen of the Year" in 1972.

New South Wales Legislative Assembly
Preceded by Arthur Gardiner	Member for Newcastle; 1922 – 1927; Served alongside: Baddeley, Connell, Cromarty/Booth, Murray	Succeeded by Peter Connolly
