= David Murray (New South Wales politician) =

Australian politician

Personal details
- Born: 15 February 1885 Balmain, New South Wales
- Died: 5 August 1928 (aged 43) Marrickville, New South Wales
- Party: Labor Party

David Murray (15 February 1885 – 8 May 1928) was an Australian politician and member of the New South Wales Legislative Assembly from 1921 until his death in 1928. He was a member of the Labor Party (ALP).

Murray was born in Balmain, New South Wales and was educated to elementary level at St Benedict's School, Chippendale. He was employed as a painter by the New South Wales Government Railways in Newcastle, New South Wales but was dismissed during the 1917 strike. He was eventually re-employed in a lower graded position as a car cleaner. Murray became an official of the Amalgamated Coach-workers Union. At the 1920 state election, conducted by proportional representation, he was the fourth (and first unsuccessful) candidate on the ALP list for the 5 member seat of Newcastle. Consequently, he was appointed to the parliament on the death of William Kearsley. He was re-elected at the 1922 and 1925 elections. After the abolition of proportional representation and multi-member seats he was elected to the seat of Hamilton at the 1927election but died in the following year and was succeeded by James Smith. He did not hold ministerial or party office.

New South Wales Legislative Assembly
Preceded by William Kearsley	Member for Newcastle; 1921 – 1927; Served alongside: Connell, Estell/Baddeley, Gardiner/Skelton, Fegan/Cromarty/Booth	Succeeded by Seat Abolished
Preceded by New Seat	Member for Hamilton; 1927 – 1928	Succeeded by James Smith
