= Electoral district of Kurri Kurri =

Former state electoral district of New South Wales, Australia

Kurri Kurri was an electoral district of the Legislative Assembly in the Australian state of New South Wales created in 1927, with the abolition of the multi-member electorates of Newcastle and Maitland and named after the Hunter Region town of Kurri Kurri. It was abolished in 1968 and replaced by Wallsend.

Kurri Kurri was a safe Labor seat and was only held by a Labor candidate. Of the 15 elections, the Labor was unopposed at 6 elections, and a Communist candidate contested 7 elections with a highest vote of 14.8% at the 1935 election. The closest contest was the 1956 election, the only occasion in which a conservative party fielded a candidate, when Liberal candidate Stanley Mettam achieved 15.6% of the vote.

George Booth represented the district for more than 30 years, and when he died was succeeded by his son Ken.

== Members for Kurri Kurri ==
Member	Party	Term
George Booth	Labor	1927–1960
Ken Booth	Labor	1960–1968

== Election results ==
1965 New South Wales state election: Kurri Kurri
Party	Candidate	Votes	%	±%
Labor	Ken Booth	unopposed		
Labor hold				
