= George Booth (politician) =

Australian politician (1891–1960)

George Booth (19 March 1891 – 31 July 1960) was an Australian politician, elected as a member of the New South Wales Legislative Assembly.

Booth was born in Bolton, England. He worked part-time as a coal miner at eleven and attended classes by Philip Snowden and became interested in the Labour Movement. In 1910, he migrated to Australia and worked on railway construction in the Blue Mountains. From 1912, he worked as a coal miner at Stanford Merthyr and Pelaw Main. In 1913, he married Annie Elizabeth Bell and had one son and one daughter.

Booth was elected for the Labor Party as a member for Newcastle in 1925, during the period of proportional representation, and Kurri Kurri from 1927 to 1960. He was the Chairman of Committees (effectively deputy Speaker) from 1941 till 1959. His son, Ken Booth succeeded him as member for Kurri Kurri.

Booth died at Wallsend, New South Wales.

George Booth Drive, linking Newcastle with Kurri Kurri, is named in Booth's honour.

New South Wales Legislative Assembly
Preceded by Magnus Cromarty	Member for Newcastle; 1925–1927; Served alongside: Baddeley, Connell, Murray, Skelton	Succeeded by Peter Connolly
Preceded by New seat	Member for Kurri Kurri; 1927–1960	Succeeded by Ken Booth
