= Electoral district of Wallsend =

State electoral district of New South Wales, Australia

Wallsend New South Wales—Legislative Assembly
- Interactive map of district boundaries from the 2023 state election
- State: New South Wales
- Dates current: 1894–1904; 1917–1920; 1927–1930; 1968–present
- MP: Sonia Hornery
- Party: Labor Party
- Namesake: Wallsend
- Electors: 60,138 (2023)
- Area: 116.83 km^{2} (45.1 sq mi)
- Demographic: Outer-metropolitan
Electorates around Wallsend:
Maitland	Maitland	Port Stephens
Cessnock	Wallsend	Newcastle
Lake Macquarie	Charlestown	Newcastle

Wallsend is an electoral district of the Legislative Assembly in the Australian state of New South Wales. It has only ever been represented by a member of the Labor Party and is currently represented by Sonia Hornery.

== Geography ==
Wallsend is a Newcastle suburban electorate, deriving its name from the suburb of the same name, covering 116.83 km^{2}. It encompasses part or whole of the suburbs of Beresfield, Birmingham Gardens, Black Hill, Callaghan (encompassing Newcastle University), Cardiff, Cardiff Heights, Elermore Vale, Fletcher, Glendale, Hexham, Jesmond, Lambton, Lenaghan, Maryland, Minmi, New Lambton, New Lambton Heights, North Lambton, Rankin Park, Shortland, Tarro, Wallsend, Waratah and Waratah West. There were 56,506 people enrolled within the electorate as of January 2015.

== History ==
Wallsend was initially settled as a coal mining area and has developed into one of the poorer dormitory areas for the industrial hub of Newcastle. Throughout its history Wallsend has been a safe Labor seat.

It was first created in 1894 with the abolition of multi-member districts from part of the electoral district of Newcastle, but was abolished in 1904 with the reduction of the size of the Legislative Assembly after Federation. It was recreated between 1917 but with the introduction of proportional representation in 1920, it was absorbed into Newcastle. In 1930, it was abolished and partly replaced by Waratah. It was most recently recreated at the 1968 redistribution, largely from the abolished district of Kurri Kurri.

In its current incarnation it has had three members to date. The first was Ken Booth who eventually became the state treasurer in the Wran and Unsworth governments. He was succeeded by John Mills, who was in turn succeeded by Sonia Hornery.

At the 2023 New South Wales election, Wallsend was the safest Labor seat in the state, held on a 31% margin

== Members for Wallsend ==
First incarnation (1894–1904)
Member	Party	Term
David Watkins	Labour	1894–1901
John Estell	Labour	1901–1904
Second incarnation (1913–1920)
Member	Party	Term
John Estell	Labor	1913–1920
Third incarnation (1927–1930)
Member	Party	Term
Robert Cameron	Labor	1927–1930
Fourth incarnation (1968–present)
Member	Party	Term
Ken Booth	Labor	1968–1988
John Mills	Labor	1988–2007
Sonia Hornery	Labor	2007–present

== Election results ==
2023 New South Wales state election: Wallsend
Party	Candidate	Votes	%	±%
Labor	Sonia Hornery	33,127	63.9	+1.4
Liberal	Callum Pull	6,988	13.5	−6.5
Greens	Rebecca Watkins	5,545	10.7	+1.5
One Nation	Pietro Di Girolamo	3,532	6.8	+6.8
Animal Justice	Anna Nolan	1,088	2.1	−2.2
Independent	Joshua Starrett	811	1.6	+1.6
Sustainable Australia	Paul Akers	717	1.4	+1.4
Total formal votes		51,808	97.4	+1.0
Informal votes		1,365	2.6	−1.0
Turnout		53,173	88.4	−0.6
Two-party-preferred result
Labor	Sonia Hornery	38,043	81.8	+5.9
Liberal	Callum Pull	8,489	18.2	−5.9
Labor hold		Swing	+5.9	
