= Hugh Connell =

Australian politician and soldier

Hugh John Connell DSO, MC & Bar (12 June 1884 – 31 January 1934) was an Australian politician and soldier. Born in Sydney and trained as a teacher, he served in the First Australian Imperial Force during World War I, reaching the rank of major. He was decorated for his service, receiving the Military Cross and a bar for actions at the Battle of Messines and during the German Spring Offensive, as well as a Distinguished Service Order and two mentions in dispatches.

After the war, Connell entered politics as a member of the Australian Labor Party, representing three successive seats in the New South Wales Legislative Assembly: Newcastle (1920–1927), Kahibah (1927–1930), and Hamilton (1930–1934), which he held until his death. He is commemorated by the Hugh Connell Memorial Shield, awarded to the winner of a statewide school soccer competition.

== Early life ==
Connell was born in the Sydney suburb of Woollahra, New South Wales and educated at Woollahra and Paddington public schools, Fort Street High School and at a teachers' training college. He taught at state schools in Sydney (1900–1905), Golgolgon, and Tarcoon (1905–1908), Broken Hill and nearby Alma (1908–1910). As a result of criticism of employers during the 1909 lockout, he was transferred to Goulburn. He then taught at Howell (near Guyra), the Newcastle suburb of Wickham and the Sydney suburb of Burwood (1910–1915) and finally at the Newcastle suburb of Carrington.

== Military service ==
Connell served from the outbreak of World War I in military training and in 1916 joined the First Australian Imperial Force as a lieutenant in the 35th Battalion and was promoted to captain in May 1916. He was awarded a Military Cross at the Battle of Messines in 1917. He received a bar to his Military Cross during the German Spring Offensive of 1918. He retired in 1919 as a major.

== Political career ==
In 1920, Connell was elected as a Labor Party member for Newcastle in the New South Wales Legislative Assembly from 1920 to 1927. In 1927 he was elected to the seat of Kahibah and on its abolition in 1930, he was elected as the member for Hamilton, which he held until his death in the Newcastle suburb of Merewether.

== Honours ==
Connell received a Distinguished Service Order in 1917, a Military Cross in 1916 and a bar in 1917, and was twice mentioned in dispatches.

== Legacy ==
The Hugh Connell Memorial Shield was dedicated after Connell's death and was awarded to the winner of a statewide school soccer competition.

== Notes ==
New South Wales Legislative Assembly
Preceded by Arthur Gardiner	Member for Newcastle; 1920–1927; Served alongside: Estell/Baddeley, Fegan/Cromarty/Booth, Gardiner/Skelton, Kearsley/Murray	Succeeded by Peter Connolly
Preceded by New seat	Member for Kahibah; 1927–1930	Succeeded by Abolished
Preceded by James Smith	Member for Hamilton; 1930–1934	Succeeded by William Brennan
