= Electoral district of Hamilton (New South Wales) =

Former state electoral district of New South Wales, Australia

Hamilton was an electoral district of the Legislative Assembly in the Australian state of New South Wales created in 1927 with the abolition of proportional representation from part of the 5 member district of Newcastle and named after the Newcastle suburb of Hamilton. It was abolished in 1971 and replaced by Charlestown.

== Members for Hamilton ==
Member	Party	Term
David Murray	Labor	1927–1928
James Smith	Labor	1928–1930
Hugh Connell	Labor	1930–1934
William Brennan	Labor	1934–1935
Joshua Arthur	Labor	1935–1950
George Campbell	Labor	1950–1959
Robert McCartney	Labor	1959–1971

== Election results ==
1968 New South Wales state election: Hamilton
Party	Candidate	Votes	%	±%
Labor	Robert McCartney	12,458	60.1	−4.2
Liberal	James Reeves	8,286	39.9	+4.2
Total formal votes		20,744	97.9	
Informal votes		434	2.1	
Turnout		21,178	94.3	
Labor hold		Swing	−4.2	
