= Electoral results for the district of Murrumbidgee =

Election results for Murrumbidgee, New South Wales, Australia

Murrumbidgee, an electoral district of the Legislative Assembly in the Australian state of New South Wales, has existed from the establishment of the Legislative Assembly in 1855 until its abolition in 2011.

Election	Member	Party	Member	Party		
1856	John Hay	None	George Macleay	None		
1858	John Hay	None	George Macleay	None		
1859	William Macleay	None				
1860	William Macleay	None				
1864-65	William Macleay	None				
1869-70	William Macleay	None				
1872	William Macleay	None				
1874-75	William Forster	None				
1876 by	Joseph Leary	None				
1877	Joseph Leary	None	Member	Party		
1880	James Douglas	None	George Loughnan	None		
1882	Auber Jones	None	George Loughnan	None	Member	Party
1885	James Gormly	None	George Dibbs	None	Alexander Bolton	None
1887	James Gormly	Protectionist	George Dibbs	Ind. Free Trade	John Gale	Protectionist
1889	James Gormly	Protectionist	George Dibbs	Protectionist	David Copland	Protectionist
1891	James Gormly	Protectionist	George Dibbs	Protectionist	Arthur Rae	Labour
1893 by	James Gormly	Protectionist	George Dibbs	Protectionist	Arthur Rae	Labour
1894	Thomas Fitzpatrick	Protectionist				
1895	Thomas Fitzpatrick	Protectionist				
1898	Thomas Fitzpatrick	Protectionist				
1901	Thomas Fitzpatrick	Progressive				
1904	Patrick McGarry	Labor				
1907	Patrick McGarry	Labor				
1910	Patrick McGarry	Labor				
1913	Patrick McGarry	Labor				
1917	Patrick McGarry	Nationalist	Member	Party	Member	Party
1920	Arthur Grimm	Nationalist	Ernest Buttenshaw	Progressive	Martin Flannery	Labor
1922	Arthur Grimm	Nationalist	Ernest Buttenshaw	Progressive	Martin Flannery	Labor
1925	Edmund Best	Nationalist	Ernest Buttenshaw	Country	Martin Flannery	Labor
1927	Martin Flannery	Labor				
1930	Martin Flannery	Labor				
1932	Robert Hankinson	Country				
1935	Robert Hankinson	Country				
1938	Robert Hankinson	Country				
1941	George Enticknap	Independent Labor				
1944	George Enticknap	Labor				
1947	George Enticknap	Labor				
1950	George Enticknap	Labor				
1953	George Enticknap	Labor				
1956	George Enticknap	Labor				
1959	George Enticknap	Labor				
1962	George Enticknap	Labor				
1965	Al Grassby	Labor				
1968	Al Grassby	Labor				
1970 by	Lin Gordon	Labor				
1971	Lin Gordon	Labor				
1973	Lin Gordon	Labor				
1976	Lin Gordon	Labor				
1978	Lin Gordon	Labor				
1981	Lin Gordon	Labor				
1984	Adrian Cruickshank	National				
1988	Adrian Cruickshank	National				
1991	Adrian Cruickshank	National				
1995	Adrian Cruickshank	National				
1999	Adrian Piccoli	National				
2003	Adrian Piccoli	National				
2007	Adrian Piccoli	National				
2011	Adrian Piccoli	National				

== Election results ==
=== Elections in the 2010s ===
==== 2011 ====
2011 New South Wales state election: Murrumbidgee
Party	Candidate	Votes	%	±%
National	Adrian Piccoli	31,414	73.4	+10.2
Labor	William Wood	8,431	19.7	−12.2
Greens	George Benedyka	1,577	3.7	−1.2
Christian Democrats	Fiona Bushby	1,362	3.2	+3.2
Total formal votes		42,784	97.6	−0.2
Informal votes		1,070	2.4	+0.2
Turnout		43,854	92.1	
Two-party-preferred result
National	Adrian Piccoli	32,260	77.9	+11.8
Labor	William Wood	9,149	22.1	−11.8
National hold		Swing	+11.8	

=== Elections in the 2000s ===
==== 2007 ====
2007 New South Wales state election: Murrumbidgee
Party	Candidate	Votes	%	±%
National	Adrian Piccoli	26,772	63.2	−2.6
Labor	Michael Kidd	13,496	31.9	+3.5
Greens	Peter Carruthers	2,060	4.9	+0.7
Total formal votes		42,328	97.7	−0.6
Informal votes		978	2.3	+0.6
Turnout		43,306	92.0	
Two-party-preferred result
National	Adrian Piccoli	27,365	66.1	−2.8
Labor	Michael Kidd	14,051	33.9	+2.8
National hold		Swing	−2.8	

==== 2003 ====
2003 New South Wales state election: Murrumbidgee
Party	Candidate	Votes	%	±%
National	Adrian Piccoli	26,150	65.9	+11.4
Labor	Michael Kidd	11,878	29.9	−2.8
Greens	Martin Ducker	1,656	4.2	+4.2
Total formal votes		39,684	98.0	+0.1
Informal votes		800	2.0	−0.1
Turnout		40,484	91.9	
Two-party-preferred result
National	Adrian Piccoli	26,444	67.8	+5.8
Labor	Michael Kidd	12,543	32.2	−5.8
National hold		Swing	+5.8	

=== Elections in the 1990s ===
==== 1999 ====
1999 New South Wales state election: Murrumbidgee
Party	Candidate	Votes	%	±%
National	Adrian Piccoli	22,024	54.5	−9.5
Labor	Patrick Pittavino	13,225	32.7	−3.4
One Nation	Les Mulloy	3,378	8.4	+8.4
Democrats	Sylvia Ramsay	1,546	3.8	+3.8
Citizens Electoral Council	Lee Stroobants	271	0.7	+0.7
Total formal votes		40,444	97.9	+4.3
Informal votes		875	2.1	−4.3
Turnout		41,319	93.8	
Two-party-preferred result
National	Adrian Piccoli	23,261	62.0	−1.9
Labor	Patrick Pittavino	14,269	38.0	+1.9
National hold		Swing	−1.9	

==== 1995 ====
1995 New South Wales state election: Murrumbidgee
Party	Candidate	Votes	%	±%
National	Adrian Cruickshank	20,222	60.2	+12.5
Labor	Tony Catanzariti	13,384	39.8	+10.5
Total formal votes		33,606	93.3	+0.2
Informal votes		2,415	6.7	−0.2
Turnout		36,021	95.6	
National hold		Swing	−1.6	

==== 1991 ====
1991 New South Wales state election: Murrumbidgee
Party	Candidate	Votes	%	±%
National	Adrian Cruickshank	15,619	47.7	−18.8
Labor	Ron Anson	9,599	29.3	0.0
Country Residents	Jeanine McRae	3,725	11.4	+11.4
Independent	John Sullivan	3,121	9.5	+9.5
Democrats	Rene Brummans	696	2.1	+2.1
Total formal votes		32,760	93.1	−5.1
Informal votes		2,418	6.9	+5.1
Turnout		35,178	93.8	
Two-party-preferred result
National	Adrian Cruickshank	18,810	61.8	−8.9
Labor	Ron Anson	11,633	38.2	+8.9
National hold		Swing	−8.9	

=== Elections in the 1980s ===
==== 1988 ====
1988 New South Wales state election: Murrumbidgee
Party	Candidate	Votes	%	±%
National	Adrian Cruickshank	19,967	68.4	+44.5
Labor	Terence Allen	9,214	31.6	−8.0
Total formal votes		29,181	98.2	−0.6
Informal votes		543	1.8	+0.6
Turnout		29,724	93.0	
National hold		Swing	+17.9	

==== 1984 ====
1984 New South Wales state election: Murrumbidgee
Party	Candidate	Votes	%	±%
Labor	Margaret Delves	11,917	38.7	−14.8
Independent	Thomas Marriott	8,281	26.9	+4.9
National	Adrian Cruickshank	7,773	25.2	+0.5
Liberal	Brian Thornton	2,857	9.3	+9.3
Total formal votes		30,828	98.7	+0.2
Informal votes		391	1.3	−0.2
Turnout		31,219	92.1	+0.4
Two-party-preferred result
National	Adrian Cruickshank	15,132	51.5	+15.4
Labor	Margaret Delves	14,241	48.5	−15.4
National gain from Labor		Swing	+15.4	

==== 1981 ====
1981 New South Wales state election: Murrumbidgee
Party	Candidate	Votes	%	±%
Labor	Lin Gordon	15,865	53.5	
National Country	John Armstrong	7,320	24.7	
Independent	Thomas Marriott	6,483	21.8	
Total formal votes		29,668	98.5	
Informal votes		464	1.5	
Turnout		30,132	92.5	
Two-party-preferred result
Labor	Lin Gordon	17,365	63.9	+8.8
National Country	John Armstrong	9,820	36.1	−8.8
Labor hold		Swing	+8.8	

=== Elections in the 1970s ===
==== 1978 ====
1978 New South Wales state election: Murrumbidgee
Party	Candidate	Votes	%	±%
Labor	Lin Gordon	12,122	55.5	+4.2
National Country	John Sullivan	5,619	25.7	+5.9
Independent	Thomas Marriott	2,271	10.4	+10.4
Liberal	Harold Bancroft	1,817	8.3	−20.6
Total formal votes		21,829	98.3	−0.2
Informal votes		385	1.7	+0.2
Turnout		22,214	93.3	−0.5
Two-party-preferred result
Labor	Lin Gordon	13,006	59.6	+5.9
National Country	John Sullivan	8,823	40.4	−5.9
Labor hold		Swing	+5.9	

==== 1976 ====
1976 New South Wales state election: Murrumbidgee
Party	Candidate	Votes	%	±%
Labor	Lin Gordon	10,785	51.3	+1.6
Liberal	Donald Mackay	6,075	28.9	+1.7
Country	Bernardino Zappacosta	2,329	11.1	−9.6
Country	John Knight	1,841	8.8	+8.8
Total formal votes		21,030	98.5	+0.6
Informal votes		324	1.5	−0.6
Turnout		21,354	93.8	+2.0
Two-party-preferred result
Labor	Lin Gordon	11,286	53.7	+2.0
Liberal	Donald Mackay	9,744	46.3	−2.0
Labor hold		Swing	+2.0	

==== 1973 ====
1973 New South Wales state election: Murrumbidgee
Party	Candidate	Votes	%	±%
Labor	Lin Gordon	9,712	49.7	−4.0
Liberal	Donald Mackay	5,309	27.2	+0.8
Country	Bernardino Zappacosta	4,042	20.7	+5.8
Democratic Labor	John Hagan	465	2.4	−2.5
Total formal votes		19,528	97.9	
Informal votes		411	2.1	
Turnout		19,939	91.8	
Two-party-preferred result
Labor	Lin Gordon	10,100	51.7	−4.5
Liberal	Donald Mackay	9,428	48.3	+4.5
Labor hold		Swing	−4.5	

==== 1971 ====
1971 New South Wales state election: Murrumbidgee
Party	Candidate	Votes	%	±%
Labor	Lin Gordon	9,683	53.7	−9.3
Liberal	Ian Davidge	4,766	26.4	+15.5
Country	David Clark	2,685	14.9	−7.5
Democratic Labor	Leslie Kennedy	889	4.9	+1.2
Two-party-preferred result
Labor	Lin Gordon	10,129	56.2	−8.6
Liberal	Ian Davidge	7,894	43.8	+43.8
Labor hold		Swing	−8.6	

==== 1970 by-election ====
1970 Murrumbidgee by-election Saturday 14 February
Party	Candidate	Votes	%	±%
Labor	Lin Gordon	10,905	53.8	−9.2
Liberal	Ian Davidge	6,437	31.7	+20.8
Country	Robin Williamson	2,351	11.6	−10.8
Democratic Labor	Leslie Kennedy	593	2.9	−0.8
Total formal votes		20,286	98.4	+0.4
Informal votes		337	1.6	−0.4
Turnout		20,623	90.2	−4.0
Labor hold		Swing	−9.2	

Al Grassby (Labor) resigned to successfully contest the 1969 election for Riverina.

=== Elections in the 1960s ===
==== 1968 ====
1968 New South Wales state election: Murrumbidgee
Party	Candidate	Votes	%	±%
Labor	Al Grassby	12,871	63.0	+13.8
Country	Eric Baldwin	4,570	22.4	−11.2
Liberal	Verdon Letheren	2,238	10.9	−3.3
Democratic Labor	Leslie Kennedy	756	3.7	+0.7
Total formal votes		20,435	98.0	
Informal votes		424	2.0	
Turnout		20,859	94.2	
Two-party-preferred result
Labor	Al Grassby	13,246	64.8	+13.1
Country	Eric Baldwin	7,189	35.2	−13.1
Labor hold		Swing	+13.1	

==== 1965 ====
1965 New South Wales state election: Murrumbidgee
Party	Candidate	Votes	%	±%
Labor	Al Grassby	9,670	49.2	−0.1
Country	Eric Baldwin	6,612	33.6	+13.7
Liberal	Michael Lowing	2,791	14.2	−10.8
Democratic Labor	John Troy	592	3.0	−2.8
Total formal votes		19,665	98.1	+0.2
Informal votes		390	1.9	−0.2
Turnout		20,055	94.9	+1.3
Two-party-preferred result
Labor	Al Grassby	10,161	51.7	−0.9
Country	Eric Baldwin	9,504	48.3	+0.9
Labor hold		Swing	−0.9	

==== 1962 ====
1962 New South Wales state election: Murrumbidgee
Party	Candidate	Votes	%	±%
Labor	George Enticknap	9,128	49.3	+1.7
Liberal	Sidney Braithwaite	4,631	25.0	+25.0
Country	Alfred Tiffen	3,689	19.9	−12.7
Democratic Labor	Stanley Axtill	1,083	5.8	+1.4
Total formal votes		18,531	97.9	
Informal votes		405	2.1	
Turnout		18,936	93.6	
Two-party-preferred result
Labor	George Enticknap	9,751	52.6	−3.9
Liberal	Sidney Braithwaite	8,780	47.4	+3.9
Labor hold		Swing	−3.9	

=== Elections in the 1950s ===
==== 1959 ====
1959 New South Wales state election: Murrumbidgee
Party	Candidate	Votes	%	±%
Labor	George Enticknap	8,611	47.6	
Country	Verdon Letheren	5,903	32.6	
Independent	Sidney Braithwaite	2,774	15.3	
Democratic Labor	Francis O'Connell	798	4.4	
Total formal votes		18,086	98.0	
Informal votes		363	2.0	
Turnout		18,449	92.4	
Two-party-preferred result
Labor	George Enticknap	10,216	56.5	
Country	Verdon Letheren	7,870	43.5	
Labor hold		Swing		

==== 1956 ====
1956 New South Wales state election: Murrumbidgee
Party	Candidate	Votes	%	±%
Labor	George Enticknap	9,644	55.5	−6.8
Country	Michael Cudmore	7,721	44.5	+6.8
Total formal votes		17,365	98.7	+0.5
Informal votes		223	1.3	−0.5
Turnout		17,588	89.1	−3.5
Labor hold		Swing	−6.8	

==== 1953 ====
1953 New South Wales state election: Murrumbidgee
Party	Candidate	Votes	%	±%
Labor	George Enticknap	10,388	62.3	
Country	Richard Cuthbert	6,296	37.7	
Total formal votes		16,684	98.2	
Informal votes		313	1.8	
Turnout		16,997	92.6	
Labor hold		Swing		

==== 1950 ====
1950 New South Wales state election: Murrumbidgee
Party	Candidate	Votes	%	±%
Labor	George Enticknap	9,334	55.5	
Country	Alfred Yeo	4,386	26.1	
Liberal	John Oag	3,108	18.5	
Total formal votes		16,828	98.8	
Informal votes		209	1.2	
Two-party-preferred result
Labor	George Enticknap		57.4 (Note: Two party preferred vote was estimated.)	
Country	Alfred Yeo		42.6	
Labor hold		Swing		

=== Elections in the 1940s ===
==== 1947 ====
1947 New South Wales state election: Murrumbidgee
Party	Candidate	Votes	%	±%
Labor	George Enticknap	8,201	55.9	−11.1
Country	John Thorne	6,466	44.1	+11.1
Total formal votes		14,667	98.5	+1.4
Informal votes		227	1.5	−1.4
Turnout		14,894	94.3	+4.8
Labor hold		Swing	−11.1	

==== 1944 ====
1944 New South Wales state election: Murrumbidgee
Party	Candidate	Votes	%	±%
Labor	George Enticknap	8,573	67.0	+40.4
Country	Alan Malcolm	4,230	33.0	+10.6
Total formal votes		12,803	97.1	+0.5
Informal votes		388	2.9	−0.5
Turnout		13,191	89.5	−0.2
Member changed to Labor from Independent Labor		Swing	N/A	

- Ambrose Enticknap was the sitting MP for Murrumbidgee, who won the previous election as an Independent Labor candidate.

==== 1941 ====
1941 New South Wales state election: Murrumbidgee
Party	Candidate	Votes	%	±%
Independent Labor	George Enticknap	4,364	34.1	
Labor	Joseph Fitzgerald	3,399	26.6	
Country	George Dixon	2,863	22.4	
Country	John Thorne	1,145	9.0	
Country	John Kelly	1,027	8.0	
Total formal votes		12,798	96.6	
Informal votes		446	3.4	
Turnout		13,244	89.7	
Two-candidate-preferred result
Independent Labor	George Enticknap	7,741	60.5	
Country	George Dixon	5,057	39.5	
Independent Labor gain from Country		Swing		

=== Elections in the 1930s ===
==== 1938 ====
1938 New South Wales state election: Murrumbidgee
Party	Candidate	Votes	%	±%
Country	Robert Hankinson	7,640	50.5	−1.8
Labor	George Enticknap	7,495	49.5	+1.8
Total formal votes		15,135	98.5	+0.3
Informal votes		228	1.5	−0.3
Turnout		15,363	95.2	+0.4
Country hold		Swing	−1.8	

==== 1935 ====
1935 New South Wales state election: Murrumbidgee
Party	Candidate	Votes	%	±%
Country	Robert Hankinson	7,617	52.3	+11.0
Labor (NSW)	George Enticknap	6,941	47.7	+6.0
Total formal votes		14,558	98.2	+0.1
Informal votes		261	1.8	−0.1
Turnout		14,819	94.8	−2.3
Country hold		Swing	−4.0	

==== 1932 ====
1932 New South Wales state election: Murrumbidgee
Party	Candidate	Votes	%	±%
Labor (NSW)	Martin Flannery	5,608	41.7	−15.0
Country	Robert Hankinson	5,556	41.3	−0.7
Country	Michael Gleeson	2,044	15.2	+15.2
Federal Labor	Ernest Parkin	235	1.8	+1.8
Total formal votes		13,443	98.1	+0.1
Informal votes		264	1.9	−0.1
Turnout		13,707	97.1	+2.0
Two-party-preferred result
Country	Robert Hankinson	7,565	56.3	
Labor (NSW)	Martin Flannery	5,878	43.7	
Country gain from Labor (NSW)		Swing	N/A	

==== 1930 ====
1930 New South Wales state election: Murrumbidgee
Party	Candidate	Votes	%	±%
Labor	Martin Flannery	7,507	56.7	
Country	John Kelly	5,554	42.0	
Communist	Arthur Battle	171	1.3	
Total formal votes		13,232	98.0	
Informal votes		268	2.0	
Turnout		13,500	95.1	
Labor hold		Swing		

=== Elections in the 1920s ===
==== 1927 ====
1927 New South Wales state election: Murrumbidgee
Party	Candidate	Votes	%	±%
Labor	Martin Flannery	6,005	50.2	
Country	William Adams	5,947	49.8	
Total formal votes		11,952	98.9	
Informal votes		129	1.1	
Turnout		12,081	76.5	
Labor win		(new seat)		

==== 1925 ====
1925 New South Wales state election: Murrumbidgee
Party	Candidate	Votes	%	±%
Quota		7,060		
Labor	Martin Flannery (elected 1)	9,915	35.1	−2.5
Labor	James Lyons	1,728	6.1	+5.2
Labor	William Nulty	1,627	5.8	+5.8
Progressive	Ernest Buttenshaw (elected 2)	9,307	33.0	−1.4
Progressive	Alexander McArthur	1,127	4.0	+4.0
Nationalist	Edmund Best (elected 3)	2,195	7.8	+7.8
Nationalist	Duncan Cameron	1,217	4.3	+4.3
Nationalist	Reginald Westmore	1,044	3.7	+3.7
Independent	Mary McCracken	78	0.3	+0.3
Total formal votes		28,238	96.1	+1.1
Informal votes		1,139	3.9	−1.1
Turnout		29,377	62.2	−1.7
Party total votes
Labor		13,270	47.0	+6.1
Progressive		10,434	36.9	−3.8
Nationalist		4,456	15.8	−2.1
Independent	Mary McCracken	78	0.3	+0.3

==== 1922 ====
1922 New South Wales state election: Murrumbidgee
Party	Candidate	Votes	%	±%
Quota		6,322		
Labor	Martin Flannery (elected 1)	9,516	37.6	+20.4
Labor	James Tully	600	2.4	+2.4
Labor	James Lyons	214	0.9	+0.9
Progressive	Ernest Buttenshaw (elected 2)	8,701	34.4	+23.1
Progressive	George Wilson	544	2.1	+2.1
Progressive	Henry Moulder	532	2.1	+2.1
Progressive	James Milthorpe	506	2.0	+2.0
Nationalist	Arthur Grimm (elected 3)	3,712	14.7	−2.5
Nationalist	William Hall	723	2.9	+2.9
Nationalist	John Macallister	86	0.3	+0.3
Independent	James McMahon	151	0.6	+0.6
Total formal votes		25,285	95.0	+4.3
Informal votes		1,321	5.0	−4.3
Turnout		26,606	63.9	+4.9
Party total votes
Labor		10,330	40.9	−5.0
Progressive		10,283	40.7	+15.9
Nationalist		4,521	17.9	+0.7
Independent	James McMahon	151	0.6	+0.6

==== 1920 ====
1920 New South Wales state election: Murrumbidgee
Party	Candidate	Votes	%	±%
Quota		5,267		
Labor	Martin Flannery (elected 1)	3,624	17.2	
Labor	Patrick McGirr (defeated)	3,621	17.2	
Labor	George Bodkin	2,415	11.5	
Progressive	Ernest Buttenshaw (elected 2)	2,387	11.3	
Progressive	William Killen	1,554	7.4	
Progressive	William Adams	1,013	4.8	
Progressive	Herbert Cuthbert	274	1.3	
Nationalist	Arthur Grimm (elected 3)	3,622	17.2	
Independent	Andrew Stewart	2,020	9.6	
Ind. Nationalist	Patrick McGarry (defeated)	512	2.4	
Independent	Herbert Hawkins	22	0.1	
Total formal votes		21,064	90.7	
Informal votes		2,161	9.3	
Turnout		23,225	59.0	
Party total votes
Labor		9,660	45.9	
Progressive		5,228	24.8	
Nationalist		3,622	17.2	
Independent	Andrew Stewart	2,020	9.6	
Ind. Nationalist	Patrick McGarry	512	2.4	
Independent	Herbert Hawkins	22	0.1	

=== Elections in the 1910s ===
==== 1917 ====
1917 New South Wales state election: Murrumbidgee
Party	Candidate	Votes	%	±%
Nationalist	Patrick McGarry	4,432	57.2	+9.0
Labor	Arthur Cook	3,310	42.8	−9.0
Total formal votes		7,742	99.0	+1.4
Informal votes		79	1.0	−1.4
Turnout		7,821	58.7	−9.4
Member changed to Nationalist from Labor				

The sitting member Patrick McGarry was expelled from Labor in the November 1916 Labor split over conscription.

==== 1913 ====
1913 New South Wales state election: Murrumbidgee
Party	Candidate	Votes	%	±%
Labor	Patrick McGarry	4,274	51.8	
Farmers and Settlers	Charles Hawkins (Note: Also endorsed by Liberal Reform.)	3,973	48.2	
Total formal votes		8,247	97.6	
Informal votes		203	2.4	
Turnout		8,450	68.1	
Labor hold				

==== 1910 ====
1910 New South Wales state election: The Murrumbidgee
Party	Candidate	Votes	%	±%
Labour	Patrick McGarry	4,326	51.4	
Liberal Reform	John Fletcher	4,091	48.6	
Total formal votes		8,417	98.0	
Informal votes		175	2.0	
Turnout		8,592	67.9	
Labour hold				

=== Elections in the 1900s ===
==== 1907 ====
1907 New South Wales state election: The Murrumbidgee
Party	Candidate	Votes	%	±%
Labour	Patrick McGarry	3,931	55.6	
Liberal Reform	Thomas Fitzpatrick	3,140	44.4	
Total formal votes		7,071	98.0	
Informal votes		141	2.0	
Turnout		7,212	70.0	
Labour hold				

==== 1904 ====
1904 New South Wales state election: The Murrumbidgee
Party	Candidate	Votes	%	±%
Labour	Patrick McGarry	1,538	30.0	
Progressive	Thomas Fitzpatrick	1,495	29.2	
Liberal Reform	Alick Smith	1,447	28.3	
Independent	Thomas Campbell	523	10.2	
Independent	Alfred Humby	116	2.3	
Total formal votes		5,119	99.0	
Informal votes		53	1.0	
Turnout		5,172	63.8	
Labour gain from Progressive				

The Murrumbidgee lost part of the district to Cootamundra and was expanded to include parts of the abolished seats of Hay and Wagga Wagga. The member for The Murrumbidgee was Thomas Fitzpatrick (Progressive). The member for Wagga Wagga James Gormly (Progressive) was appointed to the Legislative Council and did not contest the election. The member for Hay was Frank Byrne who did not contest the election. The member for The Barwon was William Willis (Progressive) who unsuccessfully contested The Darling.

==== 1901 ====
1901 New South Wales state election: The Murrumbidgee
Party	Candidate	Votes	%	±%
Progressive	Thomas Fitzpatrick	1,111	66.6	−2.8
Labour	Percy Waxman	558	33.4	+2.8
Total formal votes		1,669	99.3	+0.2
Informal votes		12	0.7	−0.2
Turnout		1,681	57.7	−3.1
Progressive hold				

=== Elections in the 1890s ===
==== 1898 ====
This section is an excerpt from 1898 New South Wales colonial election § The Murrumbidgee

1898 New South Wales colonial election: The Murrumbidgee
Party	Candidate	Votes	%	±%
National Federal	Thomas Fitzpatrick	1,078	69.4	
Labour	Arthur Rae	475	30.6	
Total formal votes		1,553	99.1	
Informal votes		14	0.9	
Turnout		1,567	60.8	
National Federal hold				

==== 1895 ====
This section is an excerpt from 1895 New South Wales colonial election § The Murrumbidgee

1895 New South Wales colonial election: The Murrumbidgee
Party	Candidate	Votes	%	±%
Protectionist	Thomas Fitzpatrick	766	54.4	
Labour	Arthur Rae	641	45.6	
Total formal votes		1,407	99.7	
Informal votes		5	0.4	
Turnout		1,412	68.3	
Protectionist hold				

==== 1894 ====
This section is an excerpt from 1894 New South Wales colonial election § The Murrumbidgee

1894 New South Wales colonial election: The Murrumbidgee
Party	Candidate	Votes	%	±%
Protectionist	Thomas Fitzpatrick	711	50.1	
Independent Labour	Arthur Rae	704	49.7	
Ind. Protectionist	Thomas Humphreys	3	0.2	
Total formal votes		1,418	97.5	
Informal votes		37	2.5	
Turnout		1,455	70.4	
Protectionist win		(previously 3 members)		

==== 1893 by-election ====
1893 The Murrumbidgee by-election Thursday 30 March
Party	Candidate	Votes	%	±%
Protectionist	Sir George Dibbs (re-elected)	unopposed		
Protectionist hold				

The by-election was caused by the resignation of Sir George Dibbs (Protectionist) due to bankruptcy.

==== 1891 ====
This section is an excerpt from 1891 New South Wales colonial election § The Murrumbidgee

1891 New South Wales colonial election: The Murrumbidgee Monday 29 June
Party	Candidate	Votes	%	±%
Protectionist	James Gormly (re-elected 1)	2,718	29.6	
Labour	Arthur Rae (elected 2)	2,265	24.7	
Protectionist	George Dibbs (re-elected 3)	1,790	19.5	
Protectionist	Patrick Heffernan	1,117	12.2	
Protectionist	David Copland (defeated)	690	7.5	
Free Trade	John Peadon	603	6.6	
Total formal votes		9,183	99.5	
Informal votes		50	0.5	
Turnout		3,975	52.3	
Protectionist hold 2				
Labour gain 1 from Protectionist				

=== Elections in the 1880s ===
==== 1889 ====
This section is an excerpt from 1889 New South Wales colonial election § The Murrumbidgee

1889 New South Wales colonial election: The Murrumbidgee Friday 1 February
Party	Candidate	Votes	%	±%
Protectionist	James Gormly (elected 1)	2,711	31.5	
Protectionist	George Dibbs (elected 2)	2,078	24.1	
Protectionist	David Copland (elected 3)	2,070	24.0	
Free Trade	Alexander Smith	1,013	11.8	
Free Trade	Alfred Miller	649	7.5	
Free Trade	George Wilson	98	1.1	
Total formal votes		8,619	99.3	
Informal votes		61	0.7	
Turnout		3,391	44.8	
Protectionist hold 2				
Member changed to Protectionist from Ind. Free Trade				

==== 1887 ====
This section is an excerpt from 1887 New South Wales colonial election § The Murrumbidgee

1887 New South Wales colonial election: The Murrumbidgee Thursday 24 February
Party	Candidate	Votes	%	±%
Protectionist	James Gormly (re-elected 1)	2,226	31.5	
Protectionist	John Gale (elected 2)	1,897	26.9	
Ind. Free Trade	George Dibbs (re-elected 3)	1,630	23.1	
Free Trade	Robert Reynolds	1,310	18.6	
Total formal votes		7,063	99.6	
Informal votes		31	0.4	
Turnout		3,214	40.5	

==== 1885 ====
This section is an excerpt from 1885 New South Wales colonial election § The Murrumbidgee

1885 New South Wales colonial election: The Murrumbidgee Saturday 31 October
Candidate	Votes	%
George Dibbs (elected 1)	2,171	28.0
James Gormly (elected 2)	1,920	24.7
Alexander Bolton (elected 3)	1,585	20.4
James Douglas	1,394	18.0
Frank Cowley	696	9.0
Total formal votes	7,766	99.3
Informal votes	58	0.7
Turnout	3,518	50.5
	(1 new seat)	

George Dibbs was the Premier and a member for St Leonards where he was successfully challenged by Sir Henry Parkes on Friday 16 October.

==== 1882 ====
This section is an excerpt from 1882 New South Wales colonial election § The Murrumbidgee

1882 New South Wales colonial election: The Murrumbidgee Monday 18 December
Candidate	Votes	%
Auber Jones (elected 1)	1,405	40.5
George Loughnan (re-elected 2)	1,154	33.3
James Douglas (defeated)	907	26.2
Total formal votes	3,466	98.7
Informal votes	47	1.3
Turnout	2,679	54.9

==== 1880 ====
This section is an excerpt from 1880 New South Wales colonial election § The Murrumbidgee

1880 New South Wales colonial election: The Murrumbidgee Wednesday 1 December
Candidate	Votes	%
James Douglas (elected 1)	1,307	34.9
George Loughnan (elected 2)	1,263	33.7
Auber Jones	1,173	31.3
Total formal votes	3,743	99.2
Informal votes	30	0.8
Turnout	3,773	36.2
	(1 new seat)	

The sitting member Joseph Leary unsuccessfully contested Camden.

=== Elections in the 1870s ===
==== 1877 ====
This section is an excerpt from 1877 New South Wales colonial election § The Murrumbidgee

1877 New South Wales colonial election: The Murrumbidgee Monday 5 November
Candidate	Votes	%
Joseph Leary (re-elected)	531	36.7
Henry Parkes	468	32.4
James Gormly	447	30.9
Total formal votes	1,446	100.0
Informal votes	0	0.0
Turnout	1,483	32.3

==== 1876 by-election ====
1876 Murrumbidgee by-election Monday 21 February
Candidate	Votes	%
Joseph Leary (re-elected)	unopposed	

William Forster was appointed Agent-General in London.

==== 1874-75 ====
This section is an excerpt from 1874-75 New South Wales colonial election § The Murrumbidgee

1874–75 New South Wales colonial election: The Murrumbidgee Saturday 2 January 1875
Candidate	Votes	%
William Forster (elected)	559	55.3
Joseph Leary	384	38.0
Charles Bardwell	68	6.7
Thomas Mate	0	0.0
Total formal votes	1,011	98.7
Informal votes	13	1.3
Turnout	1,024	34.0

==== 1872 ====
This section is an excerpt from 1872 New South Wales colonial election § The Murrumbidgee

1872 New South Wales colonial election: The Murrumbidgee Tuesday 12 March
Candidate	Votes	%
William Macleay (re-elected)	unopposed	

=== Elections in the 1860s ===
==== 1869-70 ====
This section is an excerpt from 1869-70 New South Wales colonial election § The Murrumbidgee

1869–70 New South Wales colonial election: The Murrumbidgee Monday 20 December 1869
Candidate	Votes	%
William Macleay (re-elected)	unopposed	

==== 1864-65 ====
This section is an excerpt from 1864–65 New South Wales colonial election § The Murrumbidgee

1864–65 New South Wales colonial election: The Murrumbidgee Saturday 24 December 1864
Candidate	Votes	%
William Macleay (re-elected)	unopposed	

==== 1860 ====
This section is an excerpt from 1860 New South Wales colonial election § The Murrumbidgee

1860 New South Wales colonial election: The Murrumbidgee Wednesday 19 December
Candidate	Votes	%
William Macleay (re-elected)	unopposed	

=== Elections in the 1850s ===
==== 1859 ====
This section is an excerpt from 1859 New South Wales colonial election § The Murrumbidgee

1859 New South Wales colonial election: The Murrumbidgee Friday 17 June
Candidate	Votes	%
William Macleay (re-elected)	unopposed	

==== 1858 ====
This section is an excerpt from 1858 New South Wales colonial election § Murrumbidgee

1858 New South Wales colonial election: Murrumbidgee 9 February
Candidate	Votes	%
George Macleay (re-elected 1)	432	45.7
John Hay (re-elected 2)	407	42.8
Eugene Owen	111	11.7
Total formal votes	950	100.0
Informal votes	0	0.0
Turnout	950	53.4

==== 1856 ====
This section is an excerpt from 1856 New South Wales colonial election § Murrumbidgee

1856 New South Wales colonial election: Murrumbidgee
Candidate	Votes	%
George Macleay (elected)	unopposed	
John Hay (elected)	unopposed	

Polling was scheduled to be conducted on 16 April 1856. Macleay represented Pastoral District of Murrumbidgee in the old Legislative Council.
