= 1970 Murrumbidgee state by-election =

Election result for Murrumbidgee, New South Wales, Australia

The 1970 Murrumbidgee state by-election was held on 14 February 1970 for the New South Wales Legislative Assembly seat of Murrumbidgee. It was triggered by the resignation of Al Grassby (Labor) to successfully contest the federal seat of Riverina at the 1969 election.

The by-election was held on the same day as two others in Randwick and Upper Hunter and used the same boundaries as the state election.

== Dates ==
| Date | Event |
|---|---|
| 18 September 1969 | Resignation of Al Grassby. |
| 25 October 1969 | 1969 Australian federal election |
| 19 January 1970 | Writ of election issued by the Speaker of the Legislative Assembly and close of electoral rolls. |
| 23 January 1970 | Day of nomination |
| 14 February 1970 | Polling day |
| 10 March 1970 | Return of writ |

== Candidates ==
| Party | Candidate | Background |
|---|---|---|
| Democratic Labor | Leslie Michael Kennedy | Narrandera farmer, last to announce their candidacy |
| Liberal | Ian Colin Davidge | Griffith farmer |
| Labor | Alan Robert Lindsey Gordon | Leeton pharmacist, former Shire President |
| Country | Robert Alexander Williamson | Yenda farmer |

== Campaign ==
=== Country campaign ===
The Country Party's Campaign Secretary was Mrs. G. Barwick and the campaign used the slogan "The Man Who Cares".

In a meeting with the Lake Talbot War Memorial Fund Committee, Williamson committed to "tak[ing] a stand and fight[ing] for the right of the Narrandera people to obtain government assistance for improvements to the Lake Talbot Swimming Pool".

Policy commitments outlined in the campaign included:

- Speed country water supplies and sewerage.
- Finance for country industries
- Fund for Municipal and Shire Councils—Lessen rate burden.
- Extension free school buses.
- Increased Teacher College Scholarships.

==== Country events ====
The Country candidate, Robin Williamson, held a luncheon at the Hydro Hotel in Leeton with the state Minister for Public Works, Davis Hughes M.L.A. at 12:30pm on 4 February, inviting "citizens of [the] Leeton, Narrandera, Coleambally, and districts" at a subscription fee of $2.

=== Labor campaign ===
The Labor candidate, Lin Gordon, campaigned on fighting for Murrumbidgee, pointing to his track record as a Shire President. Gordon was positioned as a protest vote against "Minister Beale's Dictatorship"

Issues outlined by the campaign included:

- Neglect of school needs
- Turnover tax on business
- Wheat rationing favouring giant absentee companies
- Strangling M.I.A towns by locking up land
- Ignoring Hay-Maude areas for 5 years
- Reducing Coleambally by 40 per cent
- Procrastination over Lake Mejum

==== Labor events ====
Gordon held a number of events across the electorate during the campaign including:

- Street meeting in Griffith (Wednesday 28 January, noon)
- Street meeting in Darlington Point (Wednesday 28 January, 5 p.m.)
- Opening Campaign at Yoogali club (Friday 30 January, 8 p.m.)
- Gough Whitlam and Al Grassby in Griffith (Saturday 31 January)

=== Liberal campaign ===
The Liberal candidate, Ian Davidge, ran on a platform of giving Murrumbidgee a voice within the Askin Government and his own and the government's record.

Arguments made by his campaign included:

- No man has a better record of service, knowledge and experience for the whole electorate
- No political party or government has a better record of achievement than the one led by the State Premier, Mr. Askin.

=== Democratic Labor campaign ===
The Democratic Labor candidate, Les Kennedy, ran on a platform of "strongly support[ing] the concept of the Lake Mejum Water Conservation Scheme".

== Result ==
1970 Murrumbidgee by-election Saturday 14 February
| Party | Candidate | Votes | % | ±% |
|---|---|---|---|---|
| Labor | Lin Gordon | 10,905 | 53.8 | −9.2 |
| Liberal | Ian Davidge | 6,437 | 31.7 | +20.8 |
| Country | Robin Williamson | 2,351 | 11.6 | −10.8 |
| Democratic Labor | Les Kennedy | 593 | 2.9 | −0.8 |
| Total formal votes | | 20,286 | 98.4 | +0.4 |
| Informal votes | | 337 | 1.6 | −0.4 |
| Turnout | | 20,623 | 90.2 | −4.0 |
| Labor hold | | Swing | −9.2 | |

== See also ==
- Electoral results for the district of Murrumbidgee
- List of New South Wales state by-elections
