= The Temora Star =

Front page of The Temora Star, 10 September 1881

The Temora Star is a defunct newspaper that was published in varying frequencies from August 1880 to June 1935 for the town of Temora, New South Wales, Australia.

== History ==
The first issue of the paper was published on 14 August 1880. The proprietor of the paper at this time was Samuel Hawkins, who also published the Wagga Wagga Express. The paper was then published in Wednesday and Saturday editions through to 1883. After this date, the publication appears to have switched to a single Friday edition up until March 1884 when publication ceased. Fourteen years later, a newspaper of the same name began publication under a new proprietor, Geoffrey Goodwin Lucas, with volume one being released on 5 January 1894. At that time, the paper appears to have been released in Wednesday and Friday editions; between 1914 and 1935 the frequency varies. In 1921, the paper came under the ownership of Leslie Patrick Higgins with John Arthur Bradley, the proprietor of the competing publication the Temora Independent, acting as a silent partner. In 1935, the final edition of The Temora Star was printed as Bradley had bought out Higgins' share of the newspaper and subsequently absorbed it into the aforementioned Independent. As of April 2016, the Temora Independent continues to be published.

== Digitisation ==
The various versions of the paper have been digitised as part of the Australian Newspapers Digitisation Program project hosted by the National Library of Australia.

== See also ==
- List of newspapers in New South Wales
- List of newspapers in Australia
