= 1893 Murrumbidgee colonial by-election =

By-election in New South Wales, Australia

A by-election was held for the New South Wales Legislative Assembly electorate of Murrumbidgee on 30 March 1893 because of the resignation of the Premier Sir George Dibbs (Protectionist) due to insolvency. Sir George had twice been made bankrupt 10 and 15 years previously. He attributed his bankruptcy to depreciation in the value of his freehold and mining property.

== Dates ==
Date	Event
23 March 1893	Sir George Dibbs resigned.
24 March 1893	Sir George Dibbs declared bankrupt.
25 March 1893	Writ of election issued by the Speaker of the Legislative Assembly.
30 March 1893	Nominations
6 April 1893	Polling day
25 April 1893	Return of writ

== Result ==
1893 The Murrumbidgee by-election Thursday 30 March
Party	Candidate	Votes	%	±%
Protectionist	Sir George Dibbs (re-elected)	unopposed		
Protectionist hold				

== See also ==
- Electoral results for the district of Murrumbidgee
- List of New South Wales state by-elections
