= Auber Jones =

Australian politician

Member of the New South Wales Legislative Assembly for Murrumbidgee
- In office 18 December 1882 – 7 October 1885
- Preceded by: James Douglas
- Succeeded by: James Gormly

Personal details
- Born: Auber George Jones; 1832 Jericho, Van Diemen's Land
- Died: 30 December 1887 (aged 54–55) Young, New South Wales
- Occupation: Pastoralist; Newspaper proprietor

Auber George Jones (1832 – 30 December 1887) was an Australian grazier and newspaper owner who represented Murrumbidgee for the New South Wales Legislative Assembly from 1882 to 1885. Born in Jericho, Van Diemen's Land (now Tasmania), Jones moved to Melbourne and then to New South Wales to manage a station near Wagga Wagga. He became a wealthy pastoralist and held numerous properties in Lachlan and on the Bogan River during the 1860s and 1870s. Jones and Thomas Darlow established the Wagga Wagga Advertiser (now the Daily Advertiser) in 1868.

== Life ==
Auber George Jones was born in 1832, in Jericho, Van Diemen's Land (now Tasmania). He was the third son of Robert and Harriet Jones. During the 1850s, he was connected to the Mercury, a Hobart newspaper. On 6 May 1854, Jones married Hannah Maria Moore, daughter of the Guardian owner John Joseph Moore, in Richmond, with whom he would have two sons and four daughters. In 1855, he obtained an auctioneer's license for 'Midland Sale Yards'. Jones later moved to Melbourne where he studied under Bishop Charles Perry for the Anglican ministry, but felt that he was not suited for priesthood.

Jones moved c. 1860 to manage Gobbagombalin, a station near Wagga Wagga, New South Wales, before acquiring the station Marrar or Marrarby by 1866. Jones soon established himself as a successful pastoral speculator, holding many runs in Lachlan and on the Bogan River during the 1860s and 1870s. He lived in Wagga Wagga and established its second newspaper, the Wagga Wagga Advertiser (now the Daily Advertiser), with pastoralist Thomas Darlow in 1868. He also owned valuable businesses on Main Street, served on the local Hospital and Pastoral Association Committees, donated a cup for an intertown cricket competition, and supported the local public school. After his first wife died in 1874, Jones married Mary Milford, daughter of Thomas Callaghan, on 21 January 1878.

Jones refused to stand for the New South Wales Legislative Assembly in the 1870s due to his business commitments. He was defeated in 1880. On 18 December 1882, he was elected to the Legislative Assembly, representing Murrumbidgee. He opposed amendments of the 1880 Public Instruction Act and further Chinese immigration, and was described as "robustly independent". Jones' tenure ended 7 October 1885.

Jones moved to Grenfell in 1883. On 30 December 1887, he died from apoplexy in Young and was buried in the Anglican section of the Wagga Wagga cemetery, leaving behind a £162,418 estate. His will kept his second wife from any benefit from his estate or authority over any of his children.

New South Wales Legislative Assembly
Preceded by James Douglas	Member for Murrumbidgee; 1882–1885; Served alongside: George Loughnan	Succeeded by Alexander Bolton; George Dibbs; James Gormly
