= 1876 Murrumbidgee colonial by-election =

By-election in New South Wales, Australia

A by-election was held for the New South Wales Legislative Assembly electorate of Murrumbidgee on 21 February 1876 because William Forster was appointed Agent-General in London.

== Dates ==
Date	Event
4 February 1876	William Forster accepted appointment as Agent-General.
5 February 1876	Writ of election issued by the Speaker of the Legislative Assembly.
21 February 1876	Nominations
6 March 1876	Polling day
20 March 1876	Return of writ

== Result ==
1876 Murrumbidgee by-election Monday 21 February
Candidate	Votes	%
Joseph Leary (re-elected)	unopposed	

== See also ==
- Electoral results for the district of Murrumbidgee
- List of New South Wales state by-elections
