= The Queanbeyan Observer =

English language newspaper (1884–1915)

The Queanbeyan Observer

The Queanbeyan Observer was an English language newspaper published from 1884 until 1955 in Queanbeyan, New South Wales, Australia by John Gale.

== History ==
The Queanbeyan Observer has had various name changes over the eons including through mergers. Beginning publication in 1884 it merged with The Queanbeyan Age in 1915. Its new title was The Queanbeyan Age and the Queanbeyan Observer and it was published from 15 April 1915 until 1 April 1927. Then in 1927 it merged with the Queanbeyan Canberra Advocate to become The Queanbeyan Age Canberra Advocate, which was published from 5 April 1927. Its final issue was 22 July the same year.

== Digitisation ==
The Queanbeyan Observer has been digitised as part of the Australian Newspapers Digitisation Program of the National Library of Australia.

== See also ==
- The Queanbeyan Age
- List of newspapers in New South Wales
- List of newspapers in Australia
