= Donald Mackay (anti-drugs campaigner) =

Australian activist and murder victim (1933–1977)

- Born: Donald Bruce Mackay; 13 September 1933; Griffith, New South Wales, Australia
- Disappeared: 15 July 1977 (aged 43)
- Occupation: Businessman
- Years active: 1950s−1977
- Known for: Anti-drugs campaigning
- Political party: Liberal

Donald Bruce Mackay (13 September 1933 – 15 July 1977) was an Australian businessman and anti-drug campaigner. He disappeared in 1977, but his body has never been found. In 1986, James Bazley was convicted for his murder.

== Personal life and background ==
Donald Mackay was born in Griffith, New South Wales, and raised in Sydney, attending Barker College. His wife Barbara (1935–2001) was an active member of the Uniting Church in Griffith and was a part-time physiotherapist. The couple had four children: Paul, Ruth, Mary, and James. Mackay and his family ran a furniture business in Griffith called Mackay's Furniture. The family still owns a property in Griffith, but the furniture store was sold in July 2019.

== Lead-up to murder ==
In 1974, Mackay stood as a Liberal candidate for the House of Representatives against Al Grassby in the electorate of Riverina. His 'voting preferences' went to the Country Party candidate John Sullivan, allowing Sullivan to unseat Grassby. Mackay also stood for the Liberal Party in the state seat of Murrumbidgee at the 1973 and 1976 New South Wales state elections but was unsuccessful.

Concerned about the growing illegal drug trade in his local area, and learning of a large crop of marijuana in nearby Coleambally, Mackay informed Sydney drug squad detectives, resulting in several arrests and the conviction of four men of Italian descent. At the trial of the arrested men, Mackay was identified as the whistleblower.

An attempt was made to lure Mackay to Jerilderie by a "Mr Adams" who wished to make a large order of furniture from Mackay's business. Mackay, busy with other matters, sent employee Bruce Pursehouse to meet "Adams", who did not approach Pursehouse. This is believed to have been an attempt to assassinate Mackay. Pursehouse later identified a man he had seen at Jerilderie as a suspect in the Mackay killing.

== Murder ==
On 15 July 1977, Mackay disappeared from a hotel car park after having drinks with friends and has never been found. Stains from his blood group were evident on his van and on the ground nearby and his car keys were underneath the van. Nearby were drag marks, hair, and three spent .22 calibre cartridges.

The Woodward Royal Commission found that the six suspects in the murder all had alibis. On the night of the murder, Tony Sergi and Domenic Sergi, nominated as principal suspects by the Commission, were on a "pub crawl" in Griffith with a number of police officers; Giuseppe Barbaro and Rocco Barbaro went to Sydney and the Gold Coast, not returning to Griffith until 20 July; Francesco Barbaro, brother-in-law of Tony Sergi and cousin of Saverio Barbaro (who had been arrested three months earlier for marijuana production), stayed at the Griffith Ex-Servicemen's Club and Robert Trimbole was at a restaurant in Randwick.

Mackay's disappearance made headlines around the nation and many, such as Griffith supervisor of detectives James Bindon, drew the conclusion that Trimbole was responsible for the apparent contract killing. Trimbole had previously made death threats against Mackay. The killing fuelled the perception of Griffith as full of mobsters and "Australia's marijuana capital".

== Woodward Royal Commission ==
The Mackay case led to the then-Premier Neville Wran appointing Justice Philip Woodward to lead the Woodward Royal Commission into the illegal drug trade in New South Wales. In 1979, Woodward found that Mackay had been murdered by a hitman acting on instructions from the "Honoured Society", a Griffith-based cell of the 'Ndrangheta, a Calabrian criminal organisation. Justice Woodward, in his final report, concluded that the members of this organisation involved in Mackay's murder were Francesco Sergi (born 24 January 1935), Domenic Sergi (born 3 March 1939), Antonio Sergi (born 4 February 1950), Antonio Sergi (born 29 October 1935), Francesco Barbaro (born 8 September 1937) and Robert Trimbole (born 19 March 1931). Justice Woodward requested for police to search Griffith's "grass castles" but this was denied.

== Aftermath of Mackay's murder ==
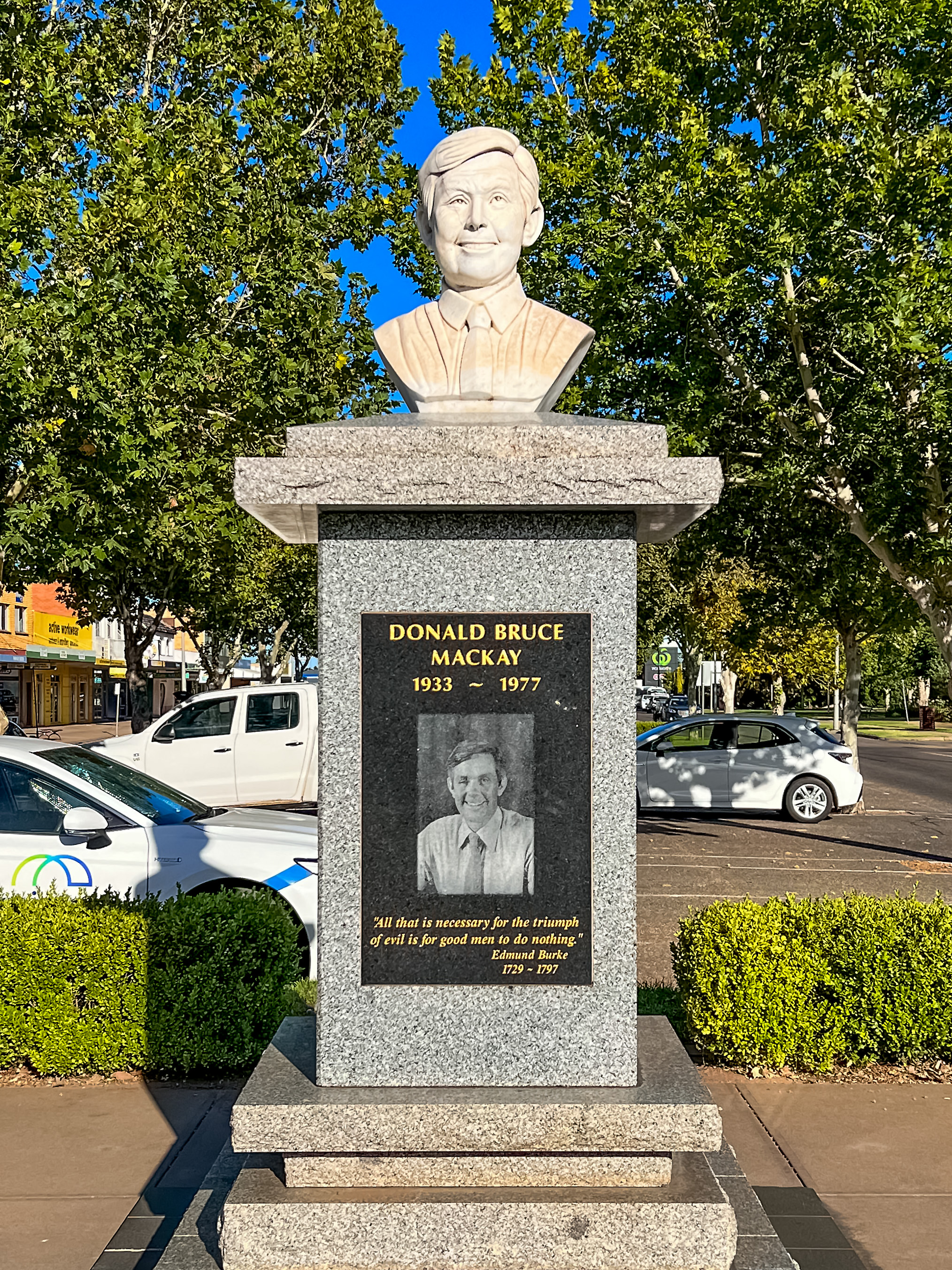
Donald Mackay Memorial

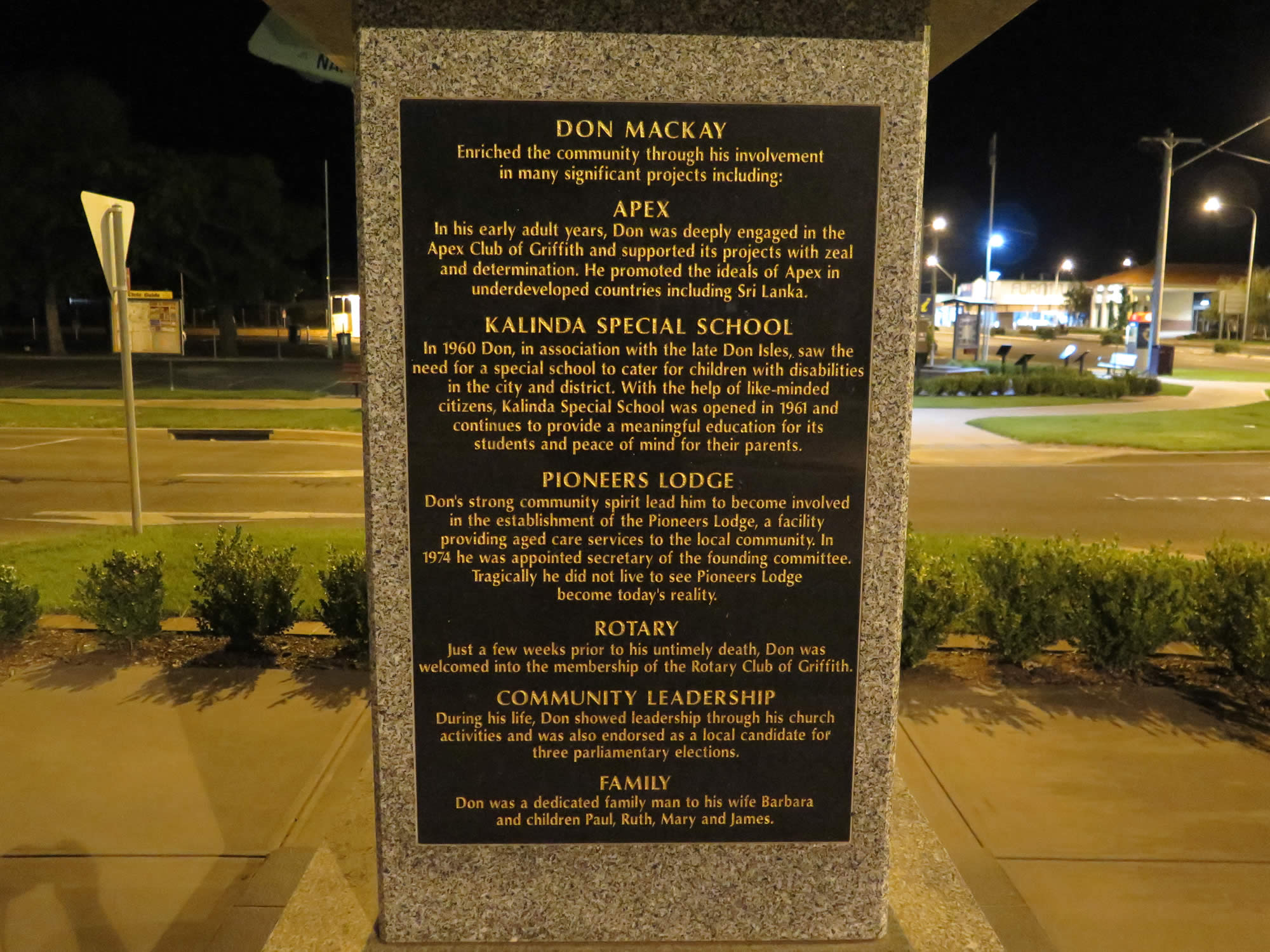
Donald Mackay Memorial

In 1980, Grassby was charged with criminal defamation when it was alleged that he had asked state politician Michael Maher to read in the New South Wales Legislative Assembly a document that imputed Mackay's wife Barbara and her family solicitor were responsible for Mackay's disappearance. An inquiry by John Nagle Q.C. found that "no decent man" could have spread the "scurrilous lies" that Grassby had. Grassby maintained his innocence and fought a twelve-year battle in the courts before he was eventually acquitted on appeal in August 1992 and was awarded A$180,000 in costs. He had already lost a civil suit filed by Barbara Mackay, forcing him to unconditionally apologise.

Gianfranco Tizzone, who turned informer in 1983, admitted to his 'complicity' in Mackay's murder. Specifically, Tizzone admitted that he arranged for a hit man he knew as 'Fred' to undertake the contract. When shown photographs of possible suspects, Tizzone fingered Bazley as the trigger man.

In 1984, the coroner ruled Mackay had died of "wilfully inflicted gunshot wounds". Two years later, hitman James Frederick Bazley was charged over the death. Bazley claimed he was innocent, blaming allegedly corrupt former Sydney detective Fred Krahe as the killer, but was convicted of conspiring with Tizzone, Trimbole, Joseph and unknown other persons to murder Mackay, as well as the murders of drug couriers Douglas and Isabel Wilson. He was sentenced to life imprisonment.

In July 2012, 35 years after his disappearance, the New South Wales police offered a $200,000 reward for information on the whereabouts of Mackay. The reward was considered a last-ditch attempt to gain evidence from reluctant witnesses. In particular those of Bazley, who was 86 in 2012 and unwell. However, in the rare moments he has broken his silence, Bazley denied he was the killer. Bazley died in 2018.

== Legacy ==
The annual Donald Mackay Churchill Fellowship was inaugurated in 1987. The Churchill Trust awards a Donald Mackay fellowship annually for journalists and detectives to study methods of investigating and bringing to light organised crime.

In late 2008, the Rotary Club of Griffith erected a memorial in Banna Avenue, the main street of Griffith, to honour the 30th anniversary of Mackay's murder. The statue of Mackay itself is a white marble bust with a plaque inscribed with "All that is necessary for the triumph of evil is for good men to do nothing."

== Media ==
Australian actor Andrew McFarlane portrayed him in the 2009 television series Underbelly: A Tale of Two Cities.

== See also ==
- List of people who disappeared mysteriously: post-1970
- List of unsolved murders (1900–1979)
- Juanita Nielsen
