= George Grimm (Presbyterian minister) =

Politician, farmer and stock and station agent in New South Wales, Australia

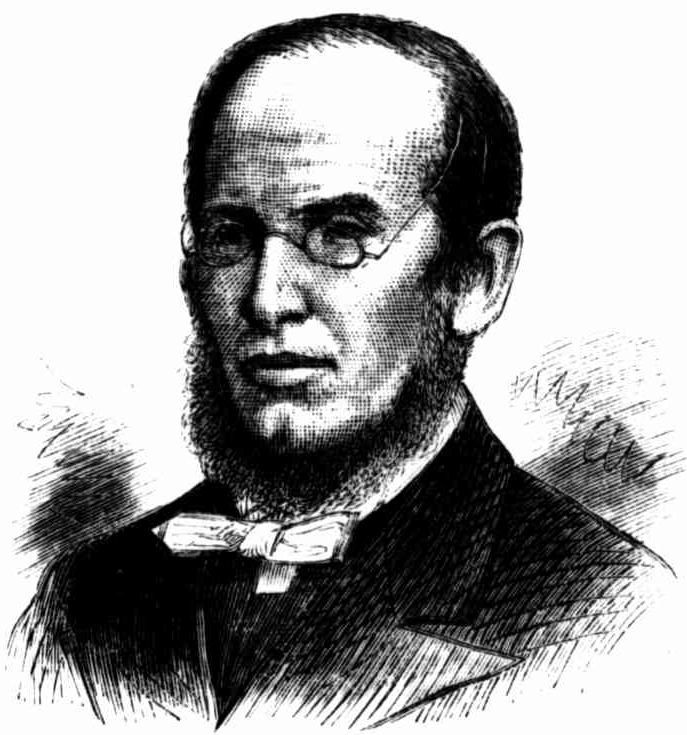

George Grimm (9 June 1833 – 2 June 1897) was a minister and Moderator of the Presbyterian Church of New South Wales, Australia.

== Early life and education ==
Grimm was born at Brechin, Forfarshire, the eldest son of Mary née Abbott and Robert Grimm who were members of the United Secession Church. He received minimal education and was apprenticed as a stonemason, but attended night school and by self-tuition. One of the parish ministers was the Rev. James McCosh and Grimm became a favourite pupil in his Bible class, and thus received a religious and intellectual impetus which did much to direct his future career in the ministry. He paid his own way to attend the Aberdeen Grammar School in 1855-56 before attending the University of Edinburgh, supporting himself by private teaching. He won the gold medal as the best Latin scholar of his first year, the following year winning the second class Straton gold medal in humanities and a prize in Greek. He graduated with a Master of Arts in 1861. Thomas Guthrie described him as "a youth of superior talents and early piety".

He attended the free Church theological course for 3 years before offering his services to the colonial committee. He married Mary Hetherington on 8 June 1865 and the couple left for the Colony of Queensland.

== Ministry ==
On arriving in Queensland towards the end of 1865, Grimm was sent to Dalby in the Darling Downs, conducting regular services, before opening the first Presbyterian church in Dalby on Sunday 20 June 1869. In 1870 The Reverend Lang insisted that he move to New South Wales where he was assigned to the parishes of Young and Grenfell which were then booming gold rush towns. Grimm organised for the building of St Andrew's Church at Grenfell and St Paul's Church at Young.

He was elected Moderator of the Presbyterian Church of New South Wales in 1879, and he moved to Sydney to be minister at Balmain West, building new churches at West Balmain and Drummoyne. He was a tutor at St Andrew's College from 1873 until 1897.

He contributed to the Sydney Mail, Presbyterian, Evening News and Australian Town and Country Journal. He relinquished his duties shortly before his death on account of failing strength, making it impossible to continue the threefold duties of minister, editor, and theological tutor.

== Personal life and death ==
Grimm died at Balmain on 2 June 1897 (aged 63), survived by his wife Mary (1843-1919), daughters and 3 sons, Arthur (1868-1939) a member of the New South Wales Legislative Assembly, George Alexander (1873-1933), an organist, baritone singer and musician, and Reginald Charles (Reg) (1882–1932), a member of the Australian Imperial Force, serving in the 7th Light Horse at Gallipoli.

== Publications ==
- The Australian explorers: their labours, perils and achievements being a narrative of discovery from the landing of Captain Cook to the centennial year (1st ed.), Melbourne: George Robertson & Company, 1888, Wikidata Q109547533
- The Unveiling of Africa. 1890.
- A Concise History of Australia. 1891.
- The Sabbath: Patriarchal, Jewish & Christian. 1892.
- Twelve Lectures on the Immortality of the Soul and the Life Everlasting. 1892.
- The Bulwarks of our Faith. 1893.
