= The Golden Age (newspaper) =

Former newspaper in New South Wales, Australia

Front page of The Golden Age, Thursday, January 28, 1864

The Golden Age was an English language newspaper published in Queanbeyan, New South Wales, Australia.

== Newspaper history ==
The Golden Age was a free local newspaper first published on the 15th of September 1860. The paper was established by local proprietor and former Methodist minister John Gale.

In the opening editorial on page 2 of the first edition, the editors promised to provide unbiased political commentary on the activities of both local and colonial parliamentary, judicial and police courts declaring the paper to be "uninfluenced by fear or favour". Refusing to adopt the middle ground in its commentary, the editors acknowledged that views expressed may be divisive, however, the readership was assured the "...single aim will at all times be, - THE ADVANCEMENT OF THE PUBLIC GOOD".

The paper was committed to promoting growth within the region particularly in the "...advocacy of local improvements and urging the development of natural resources". Also of concern to the editors was the health of the social body within the region with special care taken "to introduce only such matter as will be calculated to improve the morals and the mind of our readers".

Through his paper John Gale supported free selection and advocated reform in local administration. In 1866 he joined the committee of the new Free Selectors' Protection Association and the local school board. The newspaper did not prosper and he moved in August 1867 to Braidwood where he founded the Braidwood Independent, but in November, after a petition from Queanbeyan residents, he reopened the Queanbeyan Age.

In 1904 the paper became The Age until it returned again to the name of Queanbeyan Age in 1907. Merging with the Queanbeyan Observer in 1915, it became the Queanbeyan Age and the Queanbeyan Observer and was published until 1927. It merged again with the Canberra Advocate to become the Queanbeyan Age and Canberra Advocate and in July/August 1927 it again became the Queanbeyan Age, after absorbing The Queanbeyan Leader.

The paper is currently published as the Queanbeyan Age.

== Digitisation ==
The Golden Age has been digitised as part of the Australian Newspapers Digitisation Program of the National Library of Australia.

== See also ==
- List of newspapers in Australia
- List of newspapers in New south Wales
