= Martin Flannery (Australian politician) =

Australian politician

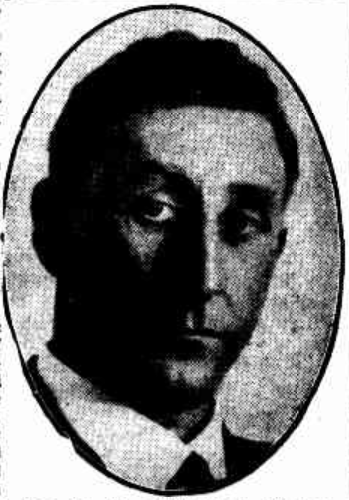
- Martin Flannery c. 1929

Secretary for Public Works
- In office 17 June 1925 – 26 May 1927

Minister for Railways
- In office 17 June 1925 – 26 May 1927

Member of the New South Wales Parliament for Murrumbidgee
- In office 20 March 1920 – 18 May 1932 Serving with Ernest Buttenshaw (1920-1927); Arthur Grimm (1920-1925); Edmund Best (1925-1927)
- Preceded by: Patrick McGarry
- Succeeded by: Robert Hankinson

Personal details
- Born: Martin Matthew Flannery; 13 December 1885 Barmedman, New South Wales
- Died: 7 February 1935 (aged 49) Woollahra, New South Wales
- Resting place: Waverley Cemetery
- Party: Labor Party
- Spouse: Elizabeth Glennan
- Children: 2
- Occupation: Compositor, Timbercutter

Martin Matthew Flannery (13 December 1885 – 7 February 1935) was an Australian politician. He served in the New South Wales Legislative Assembly from 1920 to 1932, representing the Electoral district of Murrumbidgee for the Labor Party.

== Early life ==
He was born at Barmedman to mine manager Matthew Flannery and Johanna, née Fitzgerald. He became a compositor with the Wyalong Star before travelling to New Zealand, returning to become a timbercutter for the True Blue Mine in West Wyalong and farmer. He was a member of the Yenda branch of the Labor Party and served on Bland Shire Council from 1914 to 1917. On 28 February 1922 he married Elizabeth Glennan, with whom he had two children.

== Parliamentary career ==
In 1920 Flannery was elected to the New South Wales Legislative Assembly as the Labor member for the multi-member seat of Murrumbidgee, serving alongside Ernest Buttenshaw, of the Country Party, and Nationalist Party members Arthur Grimm and Edmund Best. Flannery continued to represent the seat following the change to single member constituencies in 1927 and was described by the Riverine Grazier, an anti-Labor newspaper, as "a good local member, with a clean record ... and a formidable antagonist". He was Secretary for Public Works and Minister for Railways in the first Lang Ministry from 1925 to 1927, but was seen as an opponent of the controversial premier and was unsuccessfully opposed by Lang's supporters for Labor preselection in Murrumbidgee. Flannery served in the Assembly until the 1932 state election, when he lost his seat in a statewide swing against Labor. Flannery died at Woollahra in 1935.

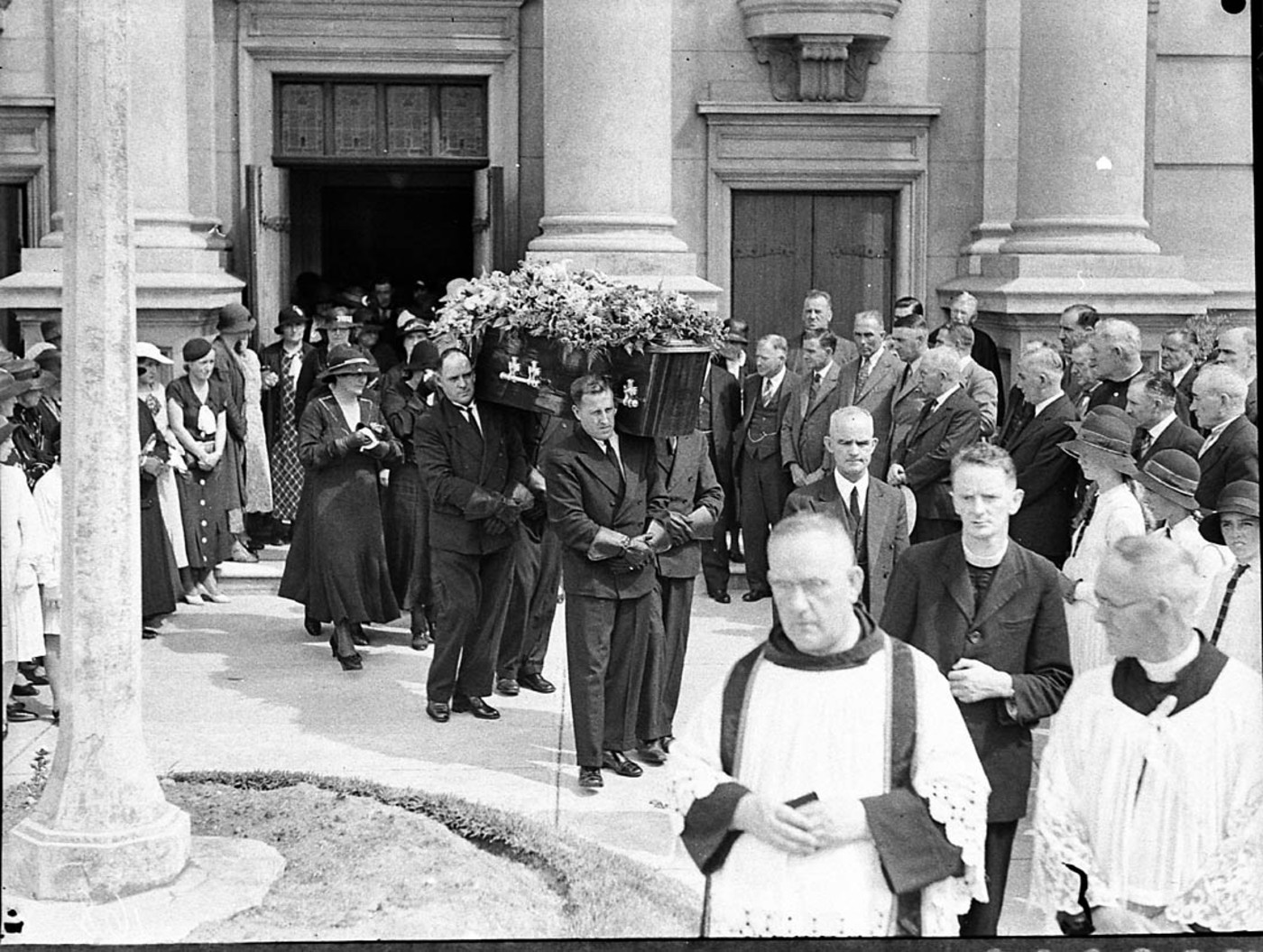
Flannery's funeral on 9 February 1935

New South Wales Legislative Assembly
Preceded by Patrick McGarry	Member for Murrumbidgee; 1920–1932; Served alongside: Buttenshaw, Grimm/Best; none	Succeeded by Robert Hankinson
