= Adrian Cruickshank =

Australian politician

Member of the New South Wales Parliament for Murrumbidgee
- In office 24 March 1984 – 27 March 1999
- Preceded by: Lin Gordon
- Succeeded by: Adrian Piccoli

Personal details
- Born: Adrian John Cruickshank; 16 December 1936 Hobart, Tasmania
- Died: 21 May 2010 (aged 73) Sydney, New South Wales
- Resting place: Griffith City Cemetery
- Party: National Party
- Spouse: Margaret
- Children: 5

Adrian John Cruickshank (16 December 1936 – 21 May 2010) was an Australian politician and philanthropist. He was the National Party member of the New South Wales Legislative Assembly for Murrumbidgee from 1984 to 1999.

Cruickshank was born in Hobart, Tasmania. He spent time in countries in the southern and eastern parts of the African Continent as a miner and prospector before returning to Australia to farm. In 1966, he became New South Wales State Chairman of the Young Australian Country Party, holding the position until 1968 when he was appointed to the state council, serving until 1984. He was elected to Carrathool Shire Council in 1970 and remained until 1974. He was chairman of the Rankins Springs branch of the party from 1972 to 1984.

In 1984, Cruickshank was selected as the National candidate for the state seat of Murrumbidgee, which was being vacated by sitting Labor member Lin Gordon. Cruickshank finished third on the primary votes behind Labor candidate Margaret Delves and independent Thomas Marriott, but with Liberal preferences pushed into second place and was elected the victor on Marriott's preferences, with a margin of 51.52%.

Partly due to redistributions which greatly strengthened the National Party in Murrumbidgee, Cruickshank faced no further serious challenges and was re-elected in 1988, 1991, and 1995. He retired in 1999, and was succeeded as National MP for the seat by Adrian Piccoli.

On 21 May 2010, Cruickshank died at the Royal Prince Alfred Hospital from pneumonia.

New South Wales Legislative Assembly
| Preceded by Lin Gordon | Member for Murrumbidgee; 1984–1999 | Succeeded by Adrian Piccoli |
