= Alexander Bolton =

Australian politician

Alexander Thorley Bolton (11 October 1847 – 23 February 1918) was an Australian politician.

He was born at Hexham to clergyman Robert Thorley Bolton and Jane Martha Ball. A commercial agent based in Wagga Wagga, he married Martha Elizabeth Devlin on 22 October 1874; they had five children. In 1885 he was elected to the New South Wales Legislative Assembly for Murrumbidgee, but he did not recontest in 1887. After leaving politics he moved to Sydney, where he died in 1918.

New South Wales Legislative Assembly
Preceded by Auber Jones; George Loughnan	Member for Murrumbidgee; 1885–1887; Served alongside: George Dibbs, James Gormly	Succeeded by John Gale
