= The Queanbeyan Age =

Australian weekly newspaper

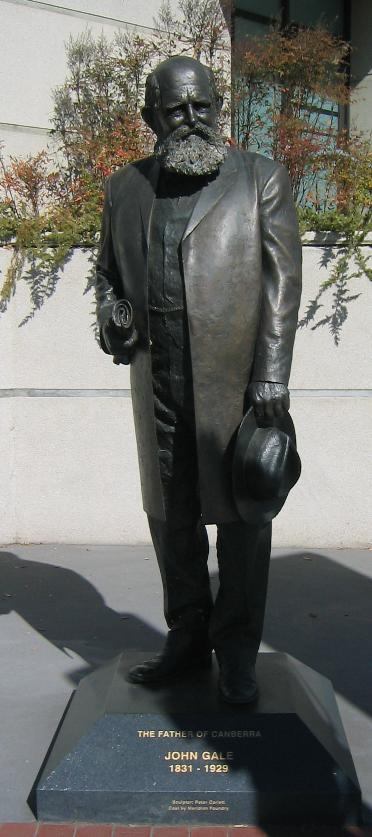
Sculpture of John Gale holding a rolled copy of The Queanbeyan Age

The Queanbeyan Age is a weekly newspaper based in Queanbeyan, New South Wales, Australia. It has had a number of title changes throughout its publication history. First published on 15 September 1860 by John Gale and his brother, Peter Francis Gale, The Golden Age, as it was known at the time, was the first newspaper of the small township on the banks of the Queanbeyan River. It was named due to the short-lived Kiandra goldrush, which generated large amounts of gold-based traffic through the region.

The Age published in 32 to 48 page editions on Fridays. Previously it published twice a week, and prior to that three times a week. Its weekly coverage includes politics, the courts, council, sport, community, health, environment, police and the emergency services. Following a merger with the Queanbeyan edition of The Chronicle, the last paid edition of the Age was published on 5 August. A free edition of the Age will be published weekly from Tuesday 16 August 2016.

The Age is part of the Federal Press Group with The Canberra Times and The Canberra Chronicle. Its website includes interactive timelines, videos, audio slideshows, photo galleries and interactive map features. It can also be found on Twitter and Facebook. Staff of the paper includes its editor Kimberley Le Lievre and sports journalist Gemma Varcoe (as of March 2016).

== History ==
=== Earlier editions ===
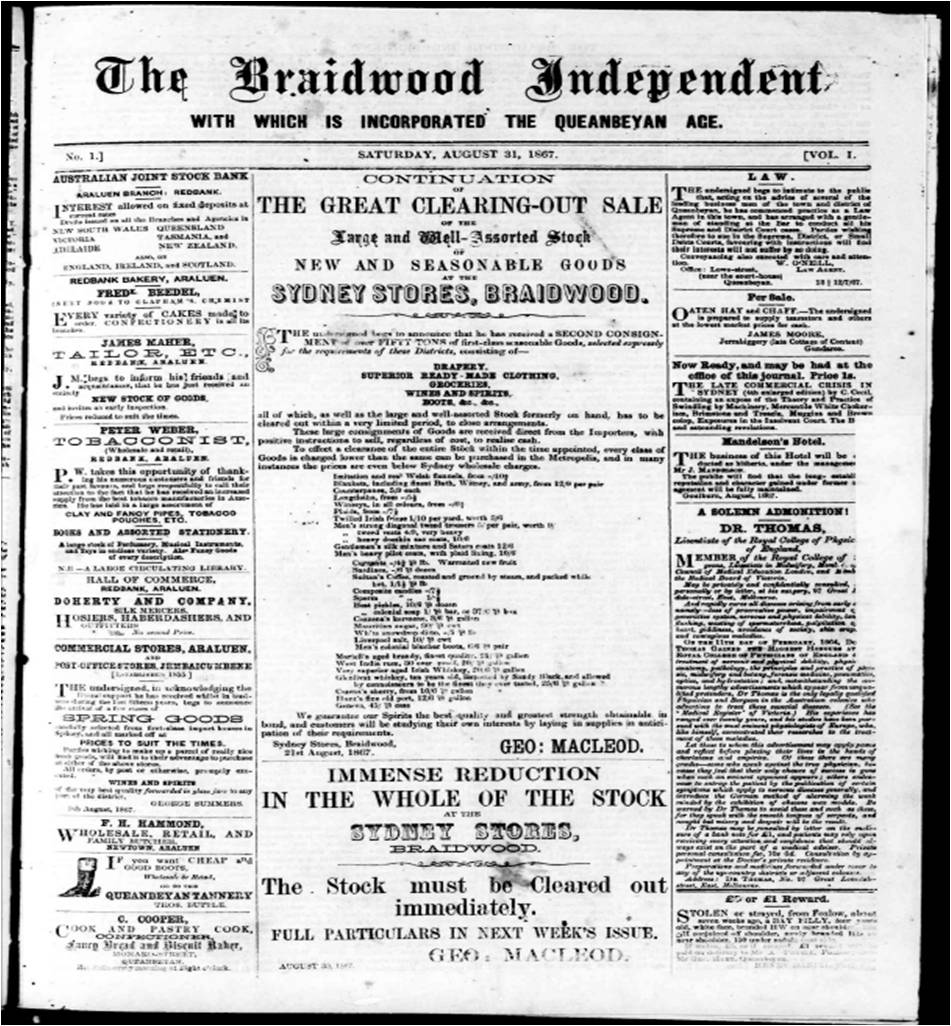
The Braidwood Independent, 31 August 1867

The Queanbeyan Age went through many changes and variations since beginning as The Golden Age in 1860. In 1864 the name changed to Queanbeyan Age and General Advertiser. This publication was in circulation until 1867 when it again changed to Braidwood Independent with the alternative title Braidwood Independent and Queanbeyan Age. At this time it incorporated other papers, Captain's Flat Miner, Bungendore Mirror and Queanbeyan Times. It changed to the Queanbeyan Age for the first time in October 1867. In 1904 it became The Age until 1907, when it returned to the name of Queanbeyan Age. In 1915 it merged with the Queanbeyan Observer to form the Queanbeyan Age and the Queanbeyan Observer which was published until 1927 when it merged with the Canberra Advocate to become the Queanbeyan Age and Canberra Advocate. In July/August 1927 it again became the Queanbeyan Age, after it absorbed the paper The Queanbeyan Leader. The paper's title remains today as the Queanbeyan Age.

==== Braidwood Independent ====
During the period 31 August 1867 until 16 October 1867, the Queanbeyan Age ran a second publication called The Braidwood Independent, which was a semi-weekly English language newspaper published by John Gale in Braidwood, New South Wales. The Braidwood Independent prospectus stated the newspaper was devoted to the material, social, and political interests of the Braidwood district.

=== 2016 merger ===
In March 2016 Fairfax Media’s Australian Community Media announced the impending merger of the Age with the Queanbeyan edition of The Chronicle. On 5 August 2016 the Queanbeyan office of the newspaper closed. The Canberra Times building in Fyshwick will be the new base for Age staff. The last paid edition of the Age was also published on 5 August. A free edition of the Age will be published weekly from Tuesday 16 August.

== Digitisation ==
The paper has been digitised as part of the Australian Newspapers Digitisation Program of the National Library of Australia.

== See also ==
- List of newspapers in Australia
