= The Daily Advertiser (Wagga Wagga) =

Australian regional newspaper serving Wagga Wagga, New South Wales

Coordinates: 35.105182°S 147.366346°E

- Front page of The Daily Advertiser on 2 October 2017
- Type: Daily newspaper
- Format: Tabloid
- Owner: Australian Community Media
- Editor: Ross Tyson
- Founded: 10 December 1868
- Headquarters: 19 Peter Street Wagga Wagga, NSW, 2650
- ISSN: 1322-8110
- OCLC number: 220658139
- Website: www.dailyadvertiser.com.au

The Daily Advertiser is the regional newspaper which services Wagga Wagga, New South Wales Australia and much of the surrounding region. It is published Monday to Friday but also appears as a sister publication called The Weekend Advertiser on Saturdays. The paper reaches about 31,000 people during its Monday to Friday printing, equating to 85% of all people aged over 14 who live in the paper's main coverage area.

== History of the paper ==
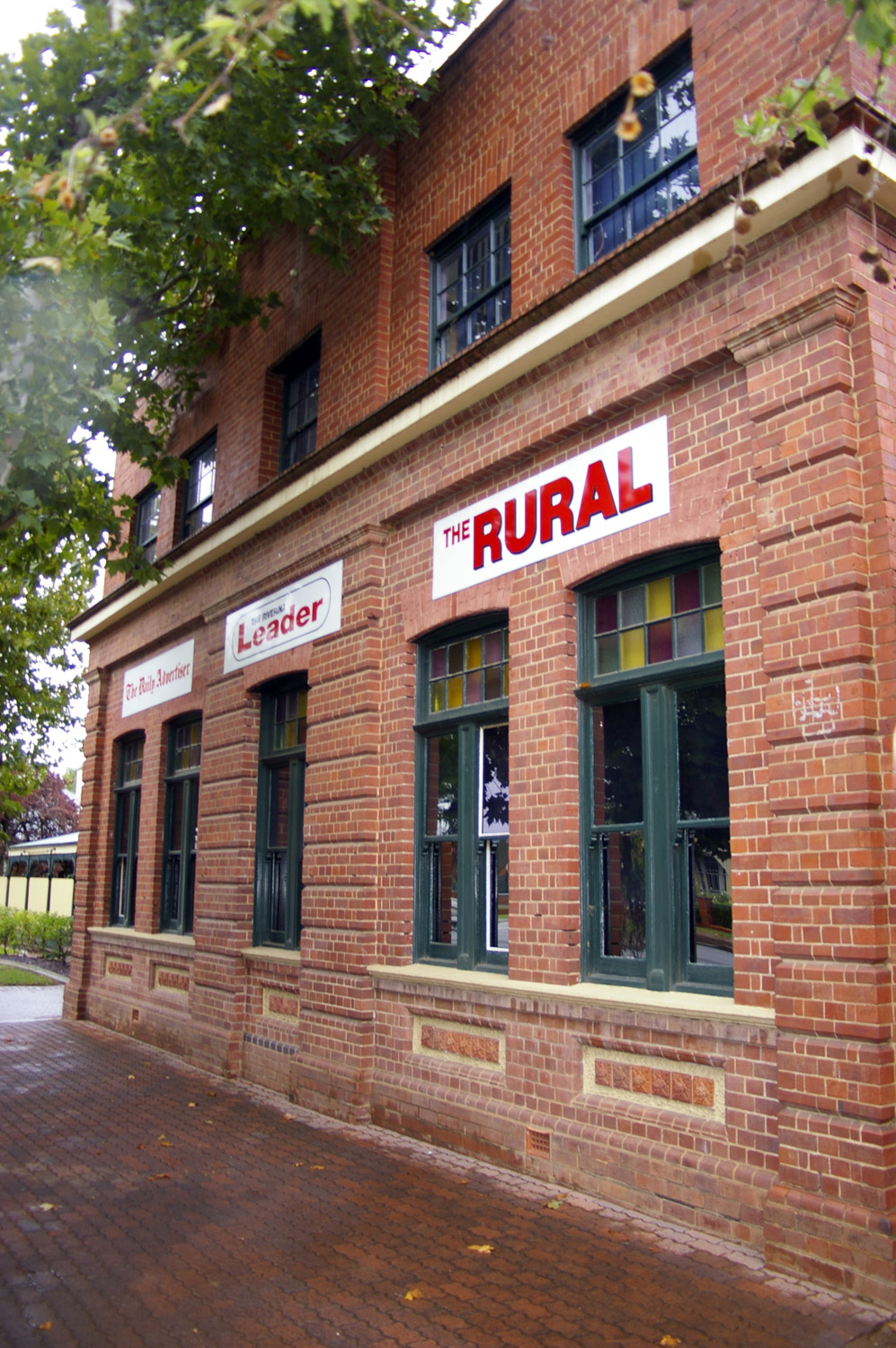
Former The Daily Advertiser headquarters

The paper started its life as The Wagga Wagga Advertiser and was founded by two wealthy local pastoralists, Auber George Jones and Thomas Darlow. It was first printed on 10 December 1868, only 80 years after the commencement of European settlement in Australia. The paper is older than a large number of city newspapers and is one of the oldest regional newspapers in the country.

The first edition was edited by Frank Hutchison, who was an Oxford graduate, and the paper was initially managed by E G Wilton, who had been trained in London. When it commenced publication, Wagga Wagga was also serviced by the Wagga Wagga Express and Murrumbidgee District Advertiser.

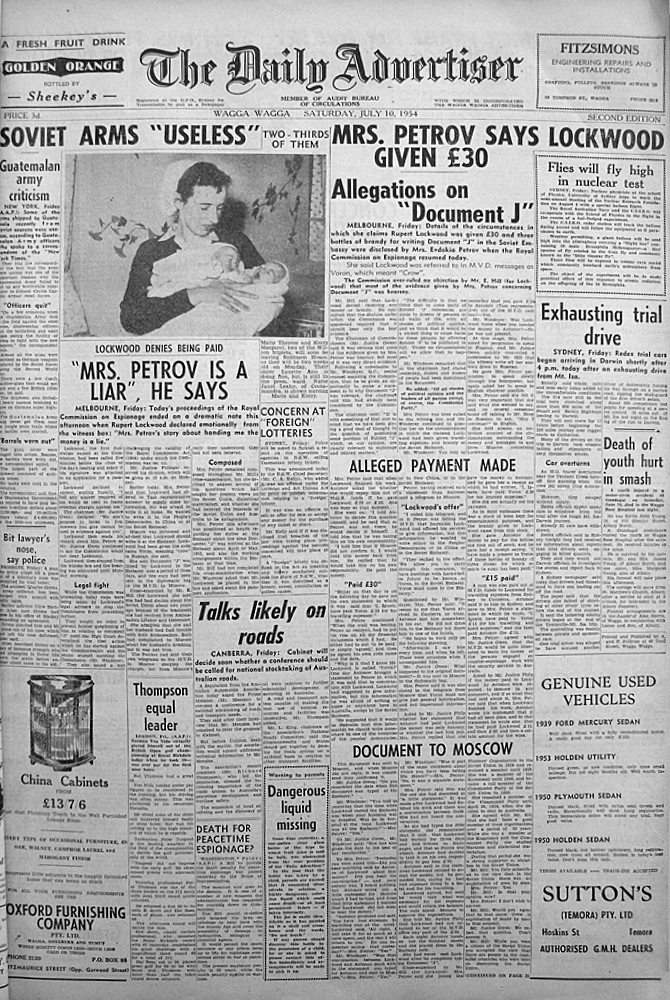
10 July 1954 front page, second edition

The Wagga Wagga Advertiser originally sold for sixpence and was printed bi-weekly in the form of a four-page broadsheet, but became a tri-weekly publication in 1880. On 3 January 1911 the newspaper was renamed The Daily Advertiser and became a "daily" on 31 December 1918.

Other than normal daily publication the paper has on occasion printed a special edition such as the issue of 7.30pm on 11 November 1918. On that day the paper's office, learning of the end of World War I, rushed its special The Daily Advertiser Extraordinary on to the streets and it was through that medium that the citizens of Wagga Wagga first heard of the end of the War.

In 1962 the newspaper reduced in size from a broadsheet to a tabloid format.

From 1991 to 2002, the editor of the Daily Advertiser was Michael McCormack, a future federal member of parliament, and Deputy Prime Minister of Australia. During McCormack time as editor, he wrote controversial articles such as supporting the Death penalty and mocking women’s sport.

The paper has for some years printed the following quote by John Milton on its front page, to profess its ethos:

This is true liberty, when free-born men,

Having to advise the public, may speak free

== Publication as a part of the Riverina Media Group ==
The current version of the paper is owned and published by Riverina Media Group, which also owns and prints The Riverina Leader; The Rural; The Area News; The Australian Senior; The Southern Cross; The Colypoint Observer; and The Irrigator.

Rural Press bought Riverina, five weeks before Rural Press merged into Fairfax Media; The Daily Advertiser is currently published by Australian Community Media.

== Digitisation ==
The paper has been digitised as part of the Australian Newspapers Digitisation Program project of the National Library of Australia.

== See also ==
- List of newspapers in Australia
- List of newspapers in New South Wales
