= Lin Gordon =

Australian politician

Member of the New South Wales Parliament for Murrumbidgee
- In office 1970 – 24 March 1984
- Preceded by: Al Grassby
- Succeeded by: Adrian Cruickshank

Personal details
- Born: Alan Robert Lindsay Gordon; 19 January 1917 Cessnock, New South Wales
- Died: 16 June 2011 (aged 94) Wagga Wagga, New South Wales
- Party: Labor Party
- Spouse: Valerie
- Children: 5

Alan Robert Lindsay Gordon (19 January 1917 – 16 June 2011) was an Australian politician. He was the Labor member for Murrumbidgee in the New South Wales Legislative Assembly from 1970 to 1984. He was Minister for Conservation and Water Resources from 1976 to 1981 (with Conservation replaced by Lands and Forests in 1980), Minister for Local Government and Lands from 1981 to 1984, and Minister for Lands and Ports for a few months in 1984.

Gordon was born in Cessnock to baker David Irvine Gordon and Mary Mildred Cleary. He was educated at government schools in Cessnock and after graduating was apprenticed to a pharmacy. He attended the University of Sydney, graduating in 1945. On 6 November 1943 he married Valerie Merle Webber, with whom he had five children. He subsequently owned a pharmacy, and also a trotting stud near Leeton. A Roman Catholic, he joined the Labor Party in 1962. In 1965, he was elected to Leeton Shire Council, where he served until 1970 (including a year as president, 1969–1970).

When Al Grassby, Labor member for Murrumbidgee, resigned in 1969 to contest the federal seat of Riverina, Gordon was selected as the Labor candidate for the resulting by-election, which took place early in 1970. He easily defeated his Liberal and Country Party opponents. In 1976, he was appointed to the ministry, holding the Conservation and Water Resources portfolios. He briefly served as Acting Minister for Health in 1977, for Local Government in 1978 and for Corrective Services in 1979. In 1980 the Conservation portfolio was split into Lands and Forests, both of which were retained by Gordon. In 1981 his Forests and Water Resources portfolios were exchanged for Local Government, which in turn was exchanged for Ports in 1984. Gordon retired in 1984; his seat was won by National Party candidate Adrian Cruickshank in his absence.

Gordon died at his Wagga Wagga home on 16 June 2011.

New South Wales Legislative Assembly
Preceded by Al Grassby	Member for Murrumbidgee; 1970–1984	Succeeded by Adrian Cruickshank
