= Wagga Wagga Express and Murrumbidgee District Advertiser =

Defunct Australian newspaper

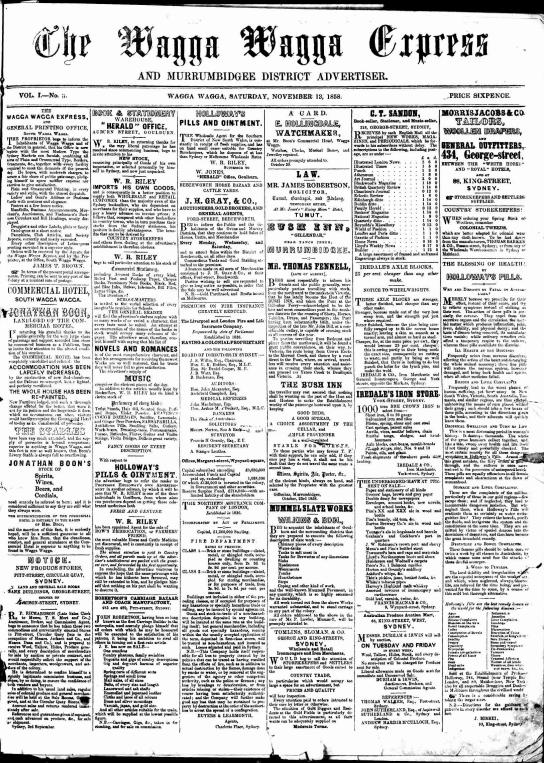
The Wagga Wagga Express and Murrumbidgee District Advertiser, front page Saturday 13 November 1858

The Wagga Wagga Express and Murrumbidgee District Advertiser was an English language newspaper published in Wagga Wagga, New South Wales. It was the first newspaper to be published in Wagga Wagga, and was in circulation from 1858 to 1939.

== History ==
The newspaper was first published on 30 October 1858 by James Thorburn Brown, predating The Daily Advertiser by ten years. The paper changed name several times and ceased publication in 1939.

Masthead	Years of publication
Wagga Wagga Express and Murrumbidgee District Advertiser	1858-1875
Wagga Wagga Express	1875-1919
The Daily Express	1919-1930
Wagga Wagga Express	1930-1939

The Wagga Wagga Express offices were destroyed by fire on 14 February 1892 with only the account books being rescued from the blaze.

== Digitisation ==
The newspaper has been digitised as part of the Australian Newspapers Digitisation Program project hosted by the National Library of Australia.

== See also ==
- List of newspapers in New South Wales
- List of newspapers in Australia
