= Robert Hankinson =

Australian politician

Robert Henry Hankinson (11 October 1877 – 25 October 1953) was an Australian politician.

Born in Edenhope in Victoria to farmer Robert Hankinson and Alice Davies, he left school when he was thirteen to become a hotel yardsman. In 1898 he moved from Yarram to the Riverina, becoming a shop assistant and ultimately acquiring a store at Grong Grong. On 16 October 1901 he married Beatrice Mary Klimpsoch, with whom he had two daughters. He was an alderman at Narrandera (1911, 1919–24, 1925–30, 1947–53) and served several periods as mayor (1920–21, 1923–24, 1925–26, 1927–30, 1950–51). He also acquired farming lands near Ardlethan, Narrandera and Eurolie. In 1932 he was elected to the New South Wales Legislative Assembly as the Country Party member for Murrumbidgee, serving until 1941. Hankinson died at Narrandera in 1953.

New South Wales Legislative Assembly
Preceded by Martin Flannery	Member for Murrumbidgee; 1932–1941	Succeeded by George Enticknap
