= James Gormly =

Australian politician

James Gormly (24 July 1836 – 19 May 1922) was an Irish-born Australian politician.

He was born in Elphin in County Roscommon to grazier Patrick Gormly and Mary Docray. The family migrated to Sydney in January 1840 and Gormly received some education at Wollongong before the family went droving around Nangue and Gundagai. After settling in Wagga Wagga in 1854, Gormly became a mail carrier, eventually selling out to Cobb & Co. in 1872. On 28 December 1858 he married Margaret Jane Cox at Holbrook; they would have eight children. In 1885 he was elected to the New South Wales Legislative Assembly as the member for Murrumbidgee. Associated with the emerging Protectionist Party, he transferred to the seat of Wagga Wagga in 1894. In 1904 the Assembly was reduced in size, and Gormly was appointed to the New South Wales Legislative Council, where he served until his death in 1922.

New South Wales Legislative Assembly
Preceded by Auber Jones; George Loughnan	Member for Murrumbidgee; 1885–1894; Served alongside: Dibbs, Bolton/Gale/Copland/Rae	Succeeded by Thomas Fitzpatrick
New seat	Member for Wagga Wagga; 1894–1904	Abolished
