= Ernest Buttenshaw =

Australian politician (1876–1950)

The Honourable Ernest Albert Buttenshaw
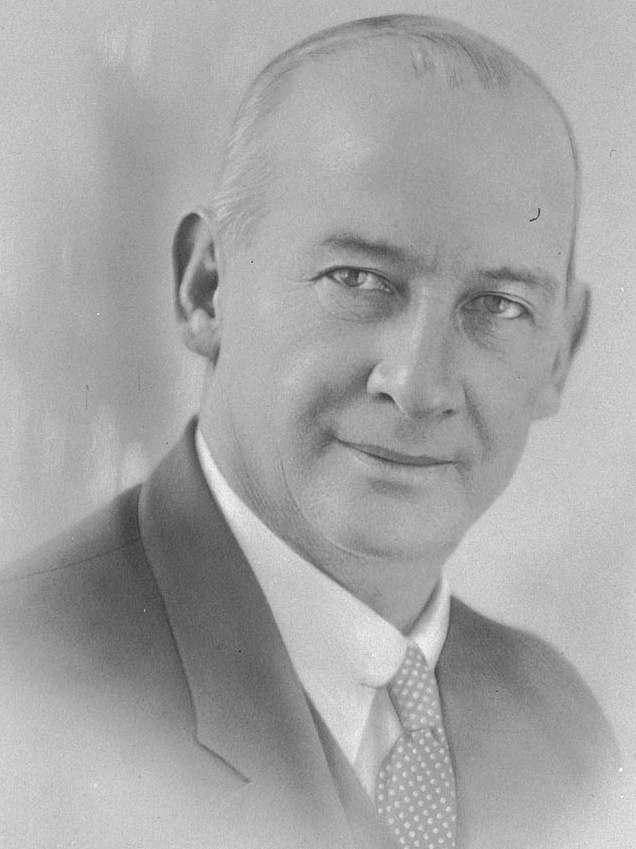
- Ernest Buttenshaw c. 1930

Leader of the Country Party
- In office 1925–1932
- Preceded by: Michael Bruxner
- Succeeded by: Michael Bruxner

Deputy Leader of the Country Party
- In office 1922–1925
- Preceded by: William Fleming
- Succeeded by: William Missingham

Minister for Railways
- In office 18 October 1927 – 16 April 1929
- Preceded by: Bill Ratcliffe

Secretary for Public Works
- In office 18 October 1927 – 3 November 1930
- Preceded by: Bill Ratcliffe
- Succeeded by: Mat Davidson

Secretary for Lands
- In office 16 May 1932 – 31 January 1938
- Preceded by: Jack Tully
- Succeeded by: Colin Sinclair

Personal details
- Born: 23 May 1876 Marengo, New South Wales
- Died: 26 June 1950 (aged 74) Ashfield, New South Wales, Australia
- Party: Country Party
- Spouses: Lucy Isabel Dean (m. 1903–d.1925); Clare (Clara) Sugars (m. 1928)

Ernest Albert Buttenshaw (23 May 1876 – 26 June 1950) was an Australian politician and member of the New South Wales Legislative Assembly from 1917 until 1932. He was a member of the Nationalist Party of Australia until 1920, when he helped to establish the Progressive Party. After 1925 he was a member of its successor, the Country Party. He was the party leader between 1925 and 1932 and held a number of government ministries.

Buttenshaw was born in Young, New South Wales. His father, was a blacksmith and he was educated to elementary level at Young Superior School. He initially worked as a delivery boy for the Post Office and later became a farmer. He was active in farmer's political groups and was the Shire President of Bland Shire in 1914-1918.

Buttenshaw was elected as the Nationalist member for Lachlan at the 1917 NSW state election. With the introduction of proportional representation in multi-member seats he became the member for Murrumbidgee between 1920 and 1927. When single member electorates were restored in 1927, he again became the member for Lachlan until his retirement in 1938. With Michael Bruxner he was one of the 'true blue' progressives who refused to support a coalition government with George Fuller's Nationalists. Bruxner's faction became the Country Party with Bruxner as the leader and Buttenshaw the deputy leader. Bruxner resigned the leadership for family reasons in late 1925 and was succeeded by Buttenshaw. After the 1927 election of the Nationalist–Country Coalition government led by Thomas Bavin, Buttenshaw became the Minister for Railways (1927–1929) and Secretary for Public Works (1927–1930). He was the Acting Premier while Bavin was on a loan raising trip to the United Kingdom between April and August 1929. In 1932, Buttenshaw stood down in favour of Bruxner and became deputy leader again. He held the position of Secretary for Lands in the government of Bertram Stevens.

He was a keen tennis player and coached Harry Hopman.

Buttenshaw retired at the 1938 election and died at his home in Ashfield on 26 June 1950 (aged 74).

New South Wales Legislative Assembly
Preceded by Thomas Brown	Member for Lachlan; 1917 – 1920	District absorbed by Murrumbidgee
Preceded by Patrick McGarry	Member for Murrumbidgee; 1920 – 1927; With: Arthur Grimm / Edmund Best; Martin Flannery	Succeeded by Martin Flannery
New district	Member for Lachlan; 1927 – 1938	Succeeded by Griffith Evans as testing
