= James Douglas (Australian politician) =

Australian politician

James Henry Douglas (died 1 May 1905) was an Australian politician.

A pastoralist and the owner of North Yanco Station before entering politics, he served from 1880 to 1882 in the New South Wales Legislative Assembly for Murrumbidgee. He later moved to Scotland, where he rented the seat of the Earl of Abercrombie, and died there in 1905.

New South Wales Legislative Assembly
Preceded by Joseph Leary	Member for Murrumbidgee; 1880–1882; Served alongside: George Loughnan	Succeeded by Auber Jones
