= John Gale (journalist) =

Australian journalist and politician (1831–1929)

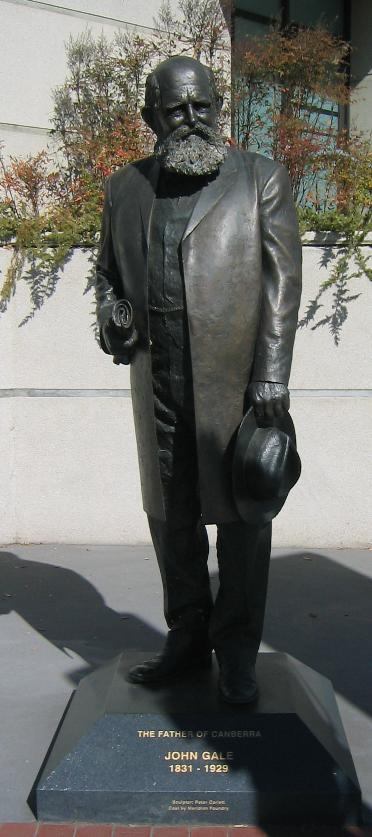
John Gale, "The father of Canberra"

John Gale (17 April 1831 – 15 July 1929) was an Australian newspaper proprietor, lay preacher and politician. He was the founder of The Queanbeyan Age, the first newspaper to serve the Queanbeyan district in New South Wales. He was also an advocate for the Queanbeyan-Canberra area as the best site of a future Australian national capital, for which he is sometimes called the "Father of Canberra" (although that epithet is also applied to Sir Austin Chapman). He served a single term as Member for Murrumbidgee in the New South Wales Legislative Assembly.

== Life ==
Gale was born in Bodmin, Cornwall, England, in 1831 and educated at Monmouth Grammar School. He was apprenticed to the printing trade in 1846 and while learning this trade also completed his training to be a missionary. John Gale arrived in Sydney, Australia, in 1853 on the 'American Lass' with six other young ministers. They were sent by the British Conference for special work in the gold fields as Methodist missionaries (probationary ministers). Gale was appointed to the Goulburn-Gunning Circuit, initially being put in charge of the Berrima section. However, within a year he was moved to the Gunning section where he covered a wide area which included the town (now city) of Queanbeyan in southern New South Wales (NSW).

In conformity with a condition imposed on all missionaries, Gale was expected to remain single during the term of his mission because the cost of paying for the upkeep of a home and a stipend to support a family was more than the church could afford. Gale was never ordained as a minister, however. He chose instead to marry Loanna Wheatley in January 1857 at Waggalallah, NSW, which was located a few miles out of Gunning. Loanna was the youngest daughter of John Wheatley who was very active in the Gunning Methodist Church and a local preacher.

Perhaps part of the reason for this decision can be glimpsed in the following passage that he wrote in 1926. "Alternately, this was my week's work : Preaching at Gunning and Goulburn on Sunday, Crookwell on Monday, Tuena on Tuesday, Binda on Wednesday, Byalla on Thursday, home on Friday, with Saturday left for prep¬aration for my next week's round. Sunday preaching at Gunning, Jerrawa and Yass, Monday at Parkwood, Tuesday at Queanbeyan, Wednesday at Gundaroo, Thursday at Collector, thence home via Waggalallah on Friday, with Saturday left for preparation for another week's work. According to a diary I kept, during the three years I was at Gunning I travelled on horseback no less than 21,000 miles, being 7,000 miles a year over, for the greater part, mere bridle-tracks or no tracks at all. Perhaps the urgency of the work called for all this; but it seemed to me hardly fair to a young man who, in addition to his preaching, had to make due preparation for his yearly examinations."

Despite leaving the formal ministry, Gale continued to act as a lay preacher on a voluntary basis for most of his life, serving either the Methodist or Presbyterian Churches in the district.

With the arrival of Annie Mercy, the first of Loanna and John Gale's 11 children, John Gale re-thought his future. Money was needed to provide food and shelter for his family and in order to start a business, and he would need capital to pay for office equipment and the leasehold of commercial premises. Fortunately, Gale's background in journalism and religious instruction provided him with the skills to teach and he soon acquired a paid position as a tutor with the Caldwell family at Moonbucca. Gale also wrote to his elder brother, Peter Francis, a photographer living in England, and asked if he would emigrate to Australia. He requested also that his brother bring with him a printing press and assist in the starting of a newspaper business in Queanbeyan. Peter Gale and his family obliged, and accompanied by the said printing press, sailed for Sydney, where they were met by Gale and his family. The brothers and their families then travelled to Queanbeyan where, on 15 September 1860, they produced their first newspaper. This publication was initially called The Golden Age after the gold deposits that had been discovered locally, but within four years the gold was gone and in 1864 the paper's name was changed to The Queanbeyan Age.

From 1887 to 1889 Gale was the Member for Murrumbidgee in the New South Wales Legislative Assembly for the Protectionist Party.

== National capital advocate ==
The Australian colonies became a federated nation at the beginning of 1901. Gale strongly advocated making the Canberra-Queanbeyan district the site of Australia's future capital city. Gale later recorded in his newspapers and on page 5 of his valuable book Canberra History & Legends that on Christmas Day 1855, he was riding his horse across the Limestone Plains to Kurrajong Hill (now called Capital Hill where the new Parliament House is built) when he had a "prophetic inspiration":

"... with the mountains to the south and to the east and the shimmer from the river, the scene invoked a mental, if not a vocal, exclamation: "What a magnificent site for one of Australia's future cities!"

On 11 June 1900, Gale (with 11 other local men) gave evidence to an NSW Royal Commissioner, Mr Alexander Oliver, proposing that Queanbeyan-Canberra be the site for the Federal Capital City. Commissioner Oliver had been appointed to examine and report to the NSW Parliament on the suitability of all the proposed locations for a National Capital. Oliver, however, favored Dalgety in his report and rejected Canberra.

The Federal Government introduced in 1904 a parliamentary bill naming Dalgety as the Federal Capital site. NSW strenuously objected to the bill. On 10 July 1907, Sir John Forrest, former Western Australian Premier, tabled his Report: "An Unique Site for the Federal City", as a formal minute in the House of Representatives in Melbourne. It contained "nine factors" each glorifying Dalgety and belittling Canberra. Some members of the NSW and Commonwealth parliaments approached John Gale and asked him to deal with Sir John's report. The result was Gale's now famous paper "Dalgety or Canberra, Which?", Gale read his paper on 24 July 1907 at a public meeting in Queanbeyan, where local residents dissented from the Commonwealth Parliament's choice of Dalgety. Queanbeyan Mayor Hinksman ordered that Gale's paper be printed and copies sent to every member of the seven Australian parliaments and to influential citizens. Gale's paper, with its "nine factors" of logic and "indisputable facts", put Dalgety in the background and strengthened Canberra's case to be Australia's capital city.

In 1907, former Australian prime ministers George Reid and J.C. Watson spoke strongly in favor of Canberra's claims to be the National Capital in speeches to the Commonwealth Parliament. Sir John Forrest, a vocal opponent of the Canberra option, said later that it was John Gale's pamphlet "Dalgety or Canberra, Which?" that won the day for Canberra as the preferred site, persuading him to alter his vote in its favour. Eventually, in 1908, Canberra was chosen as the site of Australia's National Capital.

== Recognition ==
Sir Austin Chapman declared at the first Canberra land auction that: "... if any man were entitled to be known as the Father of Canberra, it was veteran Queanbeyan journalist John Gale". Charles Studdy Daley quoted Chapman's words in various articles in The Canberra Times in the 1960s and also in his book, "As I Recall". He said that: "... John Gale lived to see his vision realized, and he was invited to attend the opening of Parliament House at Canberra, on 9 May 1927, when he was presented to Their Royal Highnesses, the Duke and Duchess of York, ... who would wish to dispute his right to be acknowledged as the 'Father of Canberra?'".

A.K. Murray, a pioneer of the District and editor of Canberra's "Federal Pioneer Magazine" (1920s), also verified that Sir Austin Chapman had acknowledged to him during conversations that Gale was entitled to be named the Father of Canberra.

Ironically, on Chapman's death in 1929, it was he who was acknowledged in the Federal Parliament as the Father of Canberra, and the Sir Austin Chapman Memorial Garden in the Canberra suburb of Chapman is dedicated to "the Father of Canberra".

A bronze statue of John Gale, titled "The Father of Canberra", is installed on the corner of Monaro and Lowe streets and Farrer Place, near Queanbeyan Courthouse. Created by artist Peter Corlett, the sculpture was unveiled in March 2001 by Heritage-culture Arts Promotions Inc. (HAPI), a not-for-profit community organization. The memorial recognises the contributions of John Gale and those members of the Queanbeyan district's community who lobbied for, and helped in the construction of, Australia's capital at Canberra.

On 24 July 2007, Queanbeyan High School students created and presented a play titled John Gale's Vision - Dalgety or Canberra, Which?. The students' performance commemorated the centenary of John Gale's pamphlet.

== Bibliography ==
- John Gale, Father of Canberra, Before Canberra
- As I Recall - Reminiscences of Early Canberra, Charles Studdy Daley. (ed) Shirley Purchase. Canberra, 1994.
- Canberra - History of and Legends Relating to the Federal Capital Territory of the Commonwealth of Australia, John Gale. Queanbeyan, 1926
- The Federal Capital – Dalgety or Canberra Which?, John Gale. Queanbeyan, 1907.
- John Gale's The Federal Capital – Dalgety or Canberra Which?, (ed) Clair Lewis. Canberra, 2001.
- Gale Force - John Gale and the siting of the National Capital, Susan Mary Woolcock Withycombe. Canberra, 2001.
- Six Days in the Mountains of Cowley, John Gale. Queanbeyan, 1901–1920.
- Trout Fishing in the Goodradigbee River, John Gale. Queanbeyan, 1904.
- An alpine excursion - notes of a trip to the mountains, rivers, plains and caves of the Australian Alps, John Gale. Queanbeyan, 1903.
- Old Canberra: 1820–1900 and the Search for a Capital, L. F. Fitzhardinge. Canberra, 1975.
- Queanbeyan Printing Museum, with working machines from the 1800s. (Near the Bowling/ croquet courts, Farrer Place, Queanbeyan (opposite the Queanbeyan Showground).
- The Golden Age, 1860–1864 (available on film at Queanbeyan Library.
- The Queanbeyan Age, 1864 - (still in production, film and some hard copy at Queanbeyan Library.
- The Queanbeyan Observer, c1891 - c1924, (film at Queanbeyan Library.
- Federal Pioneer Magazine, (ed) A K Murray). National Library Australia.

New South Wales Legislative Assembly
Preceded by Alexander Bolton	Member for Murrumbidgee; 1887 – 1889; Served alongside: Dibbs, Gormly	Succeeded by David Copland
