= David Copland =

Australian politician

David Copland (1842 – 20 July 1920) was a Scottish-born Australian politician.

He was born in Forfar to merchant David Copland and Ann Christison. He was about twelve when the family moved to New South Wales, and he eventually became a merchant and pastoralist. Around 1870 he married Elizabeth Laird Dorward Hovell, with whom he had six children. In 1889 he was elected to the New South Wales Legislative Assembly as the Protectionist member for Murrumbidgee. He was defeated in 1891. Copland died at Wagga Wagga in 1920.

New South Wales Legislative Assembly
Preceded by John Gale	Member for Murrumbidgee; 1889–1891; Served alongside: George Dibbs, James Gormly	Succeeded by Arthur Rae
