= Edmund Best =

Australian politician

Edmund Carncross Best (26 March 1869 – 22 July 1944) was an Australian politician.

He was born at Forbes to bootmaker Christopher Best and Catherine Mary, née Doran. He received a primary education before working in a store, eventually becoming partner in a general store. On 17 August 1897 he married Elizabeth Jane Cock, with whom he had five daughters. From 1913 to 1925 he was a member of Parkes Shire Council, serving as mayor from 1921 to 1924. In 1925 he was elected to the New South Wales Legislative Assembly as a Nationalist member for Murrumbidgee. With the reintroduction of single-member electorates he was elected to represent Ashburnham in 1927, but he was defeated in 1930. Best died at Randwick in 1944.

New South Wales Legislative Assembly
Preceded by Arthur Grimm	Member for Murrumbidgee; 1925–1927; Served alongside: Buttenshaw, Flannery	Succeeded by Martin Flannery
Preceded by New seat	Member for Ashburnham; 1927–1930	Succeeded by William Keast
