= George Loughnan =

Australian politician

George Cumberlege Loughnan (1842 – 18 January 1896) was an Australian politician.

He was born at Hobart in Van Diemen's Land; his father John Michael Loughnan was a captain in the 10th Bengal Lancers. His father farmed at Gippsland in Victoria. Loughnan was educated at Hobart and at Stonyhurst in England. He married Agnes Mcrae. In 1872 he purchased property of his own; he also worked as a stock and station agent. In 1880 he was elected to the New South Wales Legislative Assembly for Murrumbidgee, serving until his retirement in 1885. Loughnan died at Bourke in 1896.

New South Wales Legislative Assembly
Preceded by Joseph Leary	Member for Murrumbidgee; 1880–1885; Served alongside: James Douglas/Auber Jones	Succeeded by Alexander Bolton; George Dibbs; James Gormly
