= Patrick McGarry =

Australian politician

Patrick McGarry (1863 – 23 December 1930) was an Irish-born Australian politician.

He was born in Killalbely in County Meath to farmer Bernard McGarry and Mary Loughlin. In Ireland, where he worked as an alluvial miner, he was active in the Land League. Around 1885 he went to the United States, working in Boston for four years during which he was active in the Knights of Labor. In 1890 his arrival in New South Wales coincided with the maritime strike, which he assisted. He tried his luck on the Gundagai goldfields and spent time in the northern sugar district before returning to settle in Sydney around 1900. On 17 January 1900 he married Mary Myres, with whom he had three children. In 1904 he was elected to the New South Wales Legislative Assembly as the Labor member for Murrumbidgee. A supporter of military conscription, he left the party in the 1916 split and won re-election in 1917 as a Nationalist. In 1920, with the introduction of proportional representation, he was denied preselection for the new multi-member Murrumbidgee and was defeated as an independent Nationalist. He is believed to have made some money as a land dealer after his defeat, but he died impoverished in Hunters Hill in 1930.

New South Wales Legislative Assembly
Preceded by Thomas Fitzpatrick	Member for Murrumbidgee; 1904–1920	Succeeded by Ernest Buttenshaw; Martin Flannery; Arthur Grimm
