= Thomas Fitzpatrick (Australian politician) =

Australian politician

Thomas Fitzpatrick (10 June 1835 – 29 February 1920) was an Irish-born Australian politician.

He was born at Montrath in Queen's County, the son of Jeremiah Fitzpatrick and Mary Delany. He grew up on his parents' farm and in 1857 at the age of twenty-one migrated to Melbourne, soon moving on to the Riverina. In 1868 he became manager of a station at Temora. He married Ellen Sproule in 1869; they had four children. Around 1870 Fitzpatrick bought his own land near Junee, building up an extensive property known as Erinvale Estate. In 1894 he was elected to the New South Wales Legislative Assembly as the Protectionist member for Murrumbidgee. He served until his defeat in 1904. He travelled twice to the United Kingdom, in 1906 and 1910. Fitzpatrick died at Junee in 1920.

New South Wales Legislative Assembly
| Preceded by George Dibbs; James Gormly; Arthur Rae | Member for Murrumbidgee; 1894–1904 | Succeeded by Patrick McGarry |
