= Arthur Grimm =

Politician, farmer and stock and station agent in New South Wales, Australia

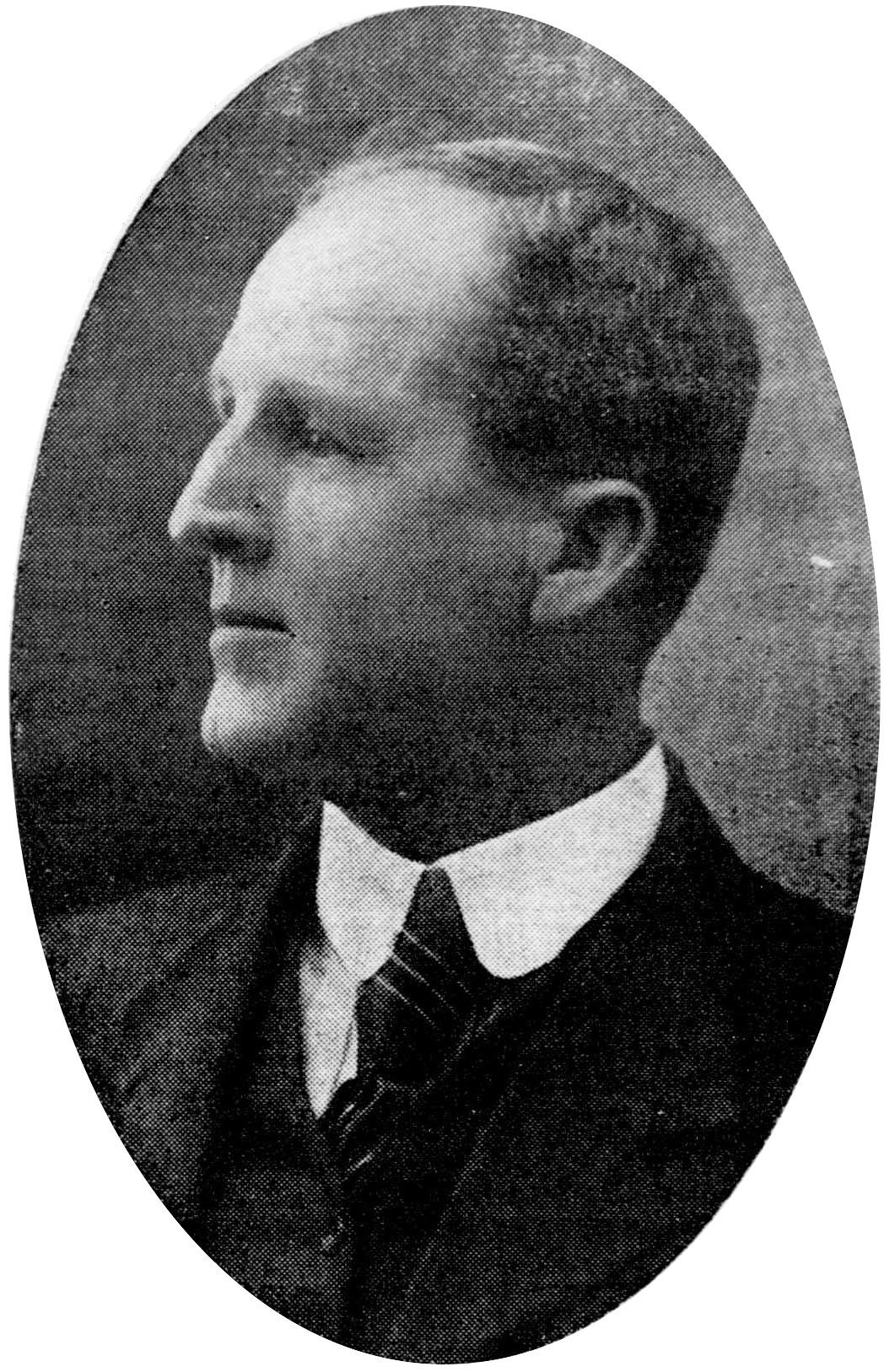
Arthur Grimm, 1913

Arthur Hetherington Grimm (27 August 1868 – 20 March 1939) was a politician, farmer and stock and station agent in New South Wales, Australia.

He was born at Dalby in Queensland to Presbyterian minister George Grimm, and Mary, née Hetherington. The family moved around due to his father's position as moderator of the New South Wales Presbyterian Church, with Grimm growing up in Young, Grenfell and Balmain. He attended Fort Street Public School and left at the age of sixteen to become a drover, shearer and farm hand. In 1891, he bought a property near Grenfell; however, he was declared bankrupt in 1895. He was discharged in 1896 and became a stock and station agent. On 27 June 1900 he married Jane Eliza Stinson, with whom he had five children.

Grimm first stood for election to the New South Wales Legislative Assembly as the Liberal candidate at the 1904 election for Grenfell but was unsuccessful, narrowly defeated by William Holman with a margin of 86 votes (3.4%). He stood again at the 1904 election for Burrangong, losing with a margin of 465 votes (8.8%). He switched his attention to local government and was elected to Weddin Shire Council in 1906 and served as president in 1913. In 1913 he was elected to the Legislative Assembly as the member for Ashburnham, as a member of the Farmers and Settlers Association with the endorsement of the Liberal Reform party. He was briefly a minister without portfolio assisting the Minister for Agriculture from February to April 1920. In that year, with the introduction of proportional representation, Ashburnham was absorbed into Murrumbidgee and Grimm was elected as one of the three members for Murrumbidgee, serving until 1925 when he did not contest the election.

He died at Manly on 20 March 1939 (aged 70).

His younger brother Reg was a member of the Australian Imperial Force, serving in the 7th Light Horse at Gallipoli. Reg died at Arthur's residence in 1932 (aged 50) from a bullet wound to the head.

New South Wales Legislative Assembly
Preceded by John Lynch	Member for Ashburnham; 1913–1920	District abolished absorbed by Murrumbidgee
Preceded by Patrick McGarry	Member for Murrumbidgee; 1920–1925; With: Ernest Buttenshaw; Martin Flannery	Succeeded by Edmund Best; Ernest Buttenshaw; Martin Flannery
