= George Enticknap =

Australian politician

The Honourable George Enticknap
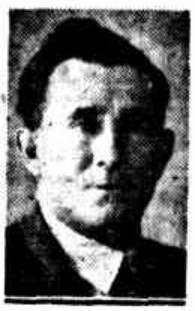

Minister for Transport
- In office 15 March 1956 – 31 May 1960
- Premier: Joseph Cahill; Bob Heffron
- Preceded by: Ernest Wetherell
- Succeeded by: John McMahon

Councillor on Willimbong Shire Council for B Riding
- In office 1 December 1928 – 17 January 1939 Serving with R. A. Struck
- Succeeded by: John Joseph O'Donoghue

Personal details
- Born: 19 May 1894 St Kilda, Victoria
- Died: 2 January 1976 (aged 81) Sydney
- Party: Labor Party

Ambrose George Enticknap (19 May 1894 – 2 January 1976) was an Australian politician and a member of the New South Wales Legislative Assembly from 1941 until 1965. He was a member of the Labor Party and held numerous ministerial positions between 1950 and 1965.

== Early life ==
Enticknap was born in St Kilda, Victoria and was educated to elementary level at state schools in rural Victoria. He initially worked as a farm hand in the Murrumbidgee Irrigation Area and was an official in the Australian Workers' Union between 1915 and 1923. He eventually owned a small orchard and was chairman of the Leeton Fruitgrowers' Co-operative Society from 1927 to 1938.

== Political career ==
Enticknap was a councillor on the first Willimbong Shire Council between 1928 and 1939 and was Shire President in 1937–1938. After two unsuccessful attempts, Enticknap was elected to the New South Wales Parliament as the Independent Labor member for Murrumbidgee at the 1941 state election. The sitting Country Party member, Robert Hankinson had retired and, while the official Labor candidate was Joseph Fitzgerald, Enticknap received significant support from the party and was allowed to join the caucus after the election.

He held the seat for the next 7 elections until he retired at the 1965 state election. He was the chairman of the Labor Party caucus between 1950 and 1965. During the premierships of Joseph Cahill, Robert Heffron and Jack Renshaw he held numerous ministerial positions including Minister for Agriculture and Minister for Conservation and Minister for Transport.

Civic offices
Preceded by F. C. Mountford	Shire President of Willimbong; 1937 – 1938	Succeeded by M. J. Gleeson
New South Wales Legislative Assembly
Preceded by Robert Hankinson	Member for Murrumbidgee; 1941–1965	Succeeded by Al Grassby
Political offices
Preceded by George Weir	Minister for Conservation; 1952 – 1956	Succeeded by Ernest Wetherell
Preceded by Ernest Wetherell	Minister for Transport; 1956 – 1960	Succeeded by John McMahon
Preceded by Ernest Wetherell	Minister for Conservation; 1960 – 1965	Succeeded by Jack Beale
Preceded by Jack Renshaw	Minister for Agriculture; 1962 – 1965	Succeeded by Bill Chaffey
