= Philip Woodward (judge) =

Australian judge

Philip Morgan Woodward (2 February 1912 – 10 November 1997) was an Australian judge. He chaired the Royal Commission into Drug Trafficking.

Woodward was president of the New South Wales Bar Association from 1969 to 1971, and president of the Australian Bar Association from 1970 to 1971. He was awarded the National Medal in 1992.

On 10 November 1997 Woodward died in a head-on car crash after suffering a heart attack.

| Preceded by Bernard Riley | President of the New South Wales Bar Association; 1969 – 1971 | Succeeded by Gordon Samuels |
