= The Wagga Wagga Advertiser =

Newspaper

Front page of The Wagga Wagga Advertiser, 1875

The Wagga Wagga Advertiser, also published as The Daily Advertiser, was an English language newspaper published in Wagga Wagga, New South Wales, Australia.

== History ==
The Wagga Wagga Advertiser was first published on 10 October 1868 as bi-weekly newspaper on Wednesdays and Saturdays at a cost of 6 pence. The newspaper was originally owned and run in partnership by two local pastoralists Auber George Jones and Thomas Darlow and the paper's first editor was an Oxford graduate named Frank Hutchison.

As the district of Wagga Wagga grew in prosperity and importance, Jones and Darlow viewed the newspaper as a means to provide the region with greater representation in the press. The paper aimed to highlight the importance of agriculture and was devoted to people from all socio-economic levels.

The partnership of Jones and Darlow was dissolved in 1871 and the paper was sold to the partnership of Stephen Sullivan and his father-in-law, J. Mackay. Sullivan had originally joined the paper as a printer when he was twenty one years old and the paper remained under ownership of two generations of the Sullivan family until 1953.

On 27 January 1880, due to popular demand, the frequency of The Wagga Wagga Advertiser was increased to tri-weekly published Tuesdays, Thursdays and Saturdays. The price of the paper was reduced in 1881 from 6 pence to 2 pence, to make it more affordable and on 31 December 1910 it became a daily publication. Under the ownership of Stephen Sullivan, the offices of the newspaper were relocated from Fitzmaurice Street to Trail Street and on 3 January 1911 the Advertiser became The Daily Advertiser. Publisher Stephen Sullivan spoke of the positive reception the move to a daily publication had received: "Since the announcement of daily publication of the paper, the proprietor has received manifestations of good will from all parts of the district, general satisfaction being expressed with a move in keeping with the rapid growth of the community".

- 1911 - The Daily Advertiser is first published.

== Digitisation ==
The Wagga Wagga Advertiser has been digitised as part of the Australian Newspapers Digitisation program project hosted by the National Library of Australia.

== See also ==
- List of newspapers in New South Wales
- List of newspapers in Australia
