= Al Grassby =

Australian politician (1926–2005)

The Honourable Al Grassby AM
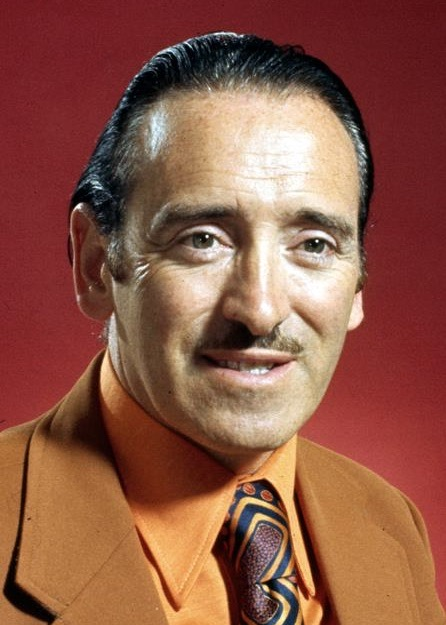
- Grassby in 1973

Minister for Immigration
- In office 19 December 1972 – 12 June 1974
- Prime Minister: Gough Whitlam
- Preceded by: Lance Barnard
- Succeeded by: Clyde Cameron

Member of the Australian Parliament for Riverina
- In office 25 October 1969 – 18 May 1974
- Preceded by: Bill Armstrong
- Succeeded by: John Sullivan

Member of the New South Wales Legislative Assembly for Murrumbidgee
- In office 1965–1969
- Preceded by: George Enticknap
- Succeeded by: Lin Gordon

Personal details
- Born: 12 July 1926 Brisbane, Queensland, Australia
- Died: 23 April 2005 (aged 78)
- Party: Australian Labor Party
- Spouse: Ellnor Grassby
- Occupation: Journalist

Albert Jaime Grassby, AM (12 July 1926 – 23 April 2005) was an Australian politician who served as Minister for Immigration in the Labor Whitlam government. He completed reforms in immigration and human rights, and is often known as the father of Australian "multiculturalism". He gained notoriety by acting as an agent of influence for the Calabrian Mafia that murdered anti-drugs campaigner Donald Mackay.

== Early life and state politics ==
He was born Albert Jaime Grassby in Brisbane, Queensland to parents of Spanish and Irish descent. His family lived in the United Kingdom during the 1930s and 1940s, and Albert was educated partly at schools in England. During World War II, his father was killed in a German air raid. After he turned 18, Grassby joined the British Army, serving in both infantry units and the British Intelligence Corps (1945–46).

Following the end of the war, Grassby returned to Australia, working as a journalist and information officer for the CSIRO in Griffith, New South Wales. In 1965, Grassby was elected as Member of the NSW Legislative Assembly for the electorate of Murrumbidgee representing the Labor Party. Grassby served as Shadow Minister for Agriculture and Conservation between 1968 and 1969. His high profile and popularity in the local community encouraged him to enter federal politics.

== Federal politics ==
Grassby won the rural electorate of Riverina for the Labor Party at the 1969 federal election. He was the seat's first Labor MP in 24 years, and only the second in 47 years. Following Gough Whitlam's victory at the 1972 election, Grassby was appointed Minister for Immigration. In this role, Grassby became one of the more high-profile members of the Whitlam ministry, and was best known for his role in the initiation of multiculturalism in Australia and the ending of the White Australia policy. This is notwithstanding that in 1966, the Holt Liberal Government introduced the Migration Act 1966, a watershed moment in immigration reform, it effectively dismantled the White Australia policy and led to a large increase in "non-white" immigration. It was not until the Fraser Liberal government's review of immigration law in 1978 that all selection of prospective migrants based on country of origin was entirely removed from official policy. Grassby did however push for more immigration from non-English-speaking countries, "banned racially selected sporting teams from playing in Australia and repealed the law that required Indigenous Australians to seek permission before going overseas."

As the White Australia policy had been formally revoked in 1973, Grassby's actions provoked disquiet among sections of the Australian community, including in his Riverina electorate and some of his ALP colleagues, who thought his reforms too radical for the period. However, Grassby could point to his enormous popularity within multicultural Australia and the subsequent growth of support for the ALP from this section of the community as more than adequate recompense for any possible loss of support from white Australia.

"In addition to his high-profile crusade for multiculturalism, Grassby also gained wide attention for his flamboyant dress sense, with his colourful ties and suits setting him apart from the unwritten dress code for politicians of sombre dark suits and plain ties".

Grassby's actions attracted criticism from anti-immigration groups, led by the Immigration Control Association, which targeted his electorate in a campaign at the May 1974 election. Partly as a result, Grassby was defeated by the National Party candidate, John Sullivan, by just 792 votes. Grassby and his supporters accused these groups of mounting a smear campaign against him.

== Commission for Community Relations ==
Following his defeat, Grassby was appointed as the first federal Commissioner for Community Relations, administering the Racial Discrimination Act 1975, which he had championed while in parliament. While he continued to work towards a multicultural Australia, Grassby could not escape controversy. In one case, Grassby nominated for preselection for the safe federal Labor seat of Parramatta following encouragement from Whitlam, who sought to return Grassby to the ministry. However, Grassby surprisingly lost the preselection ballot, because many rank-and-file Labor members objected to an outside candidate being foisted upon them.

In another case, he became entangled in one of the more sensational political cases of Australian history when he hired Junie Morosi to work at the Commission for Community Relations, which brought her into contact with a number of government ministers, including Deputy Prime Minister and Treasurer, Jim Cairns. Cairns appointed Morosi as his Principal Private Secretary, a job traditionally held by a senior public servant. The ensuing controversy surrounding the appointment led to the downfall of Cairns, and, while Grassby was not guilty of any misconduct himself, he attracted criticism by his connection to the case.

Grassby resigned in the wake of the Nagle inquiry, which found he had been involved in the attempts to table false claims about murdered political candidate Donald Mackay's family.

== Writer ==
Grassby published a number of books, including a biography of early Australian Prime Minister Chris Watson and various studies of multiculturalism in Australia.

== Recognition and honours ==
In 1982, artist Harold Thornton painted Grassby's portrait, which was a finalist in the Archibald Prize.

In recognition of his pioneering work on immigration, Grassby was appointed a Member of the Order of Australia in 1985. He received the United Nations Peace Medal in 1986.

== Legal action ==
In 1980, Grassby was charged with criminal defamation when it was alleged that he had asked a New South Wales state politician, Michael Maher, to read in the New South Wales Legislative Assembly a document that imputed that Barbara Mackay and her family solicitor were responsible for the disappearance (and probable murder) of her husband Donald Mackay, a prominent Riverina businessman who had been a Liberal candidate against Grassby in 1974. Maher, when asked why Grassby had made the request, replied that it was a matter of his own Sydney electorate's demographics: "I had the biggest concentration of Italians in Haberfield, Five Dock, Concord and Drummoyne. He [Grassby] thought I could play the Italian vote." Grassby maintained his innocence and fought a twelve-year battle in the courts before he was eventually acquitted on appeal in August 1992. He was awarded $180,000 in costs. Grassby had already lost a civil suit filed by Barbara Mackay, forcing him to unconditionally apologise.

== Death and subsequent media reports ==
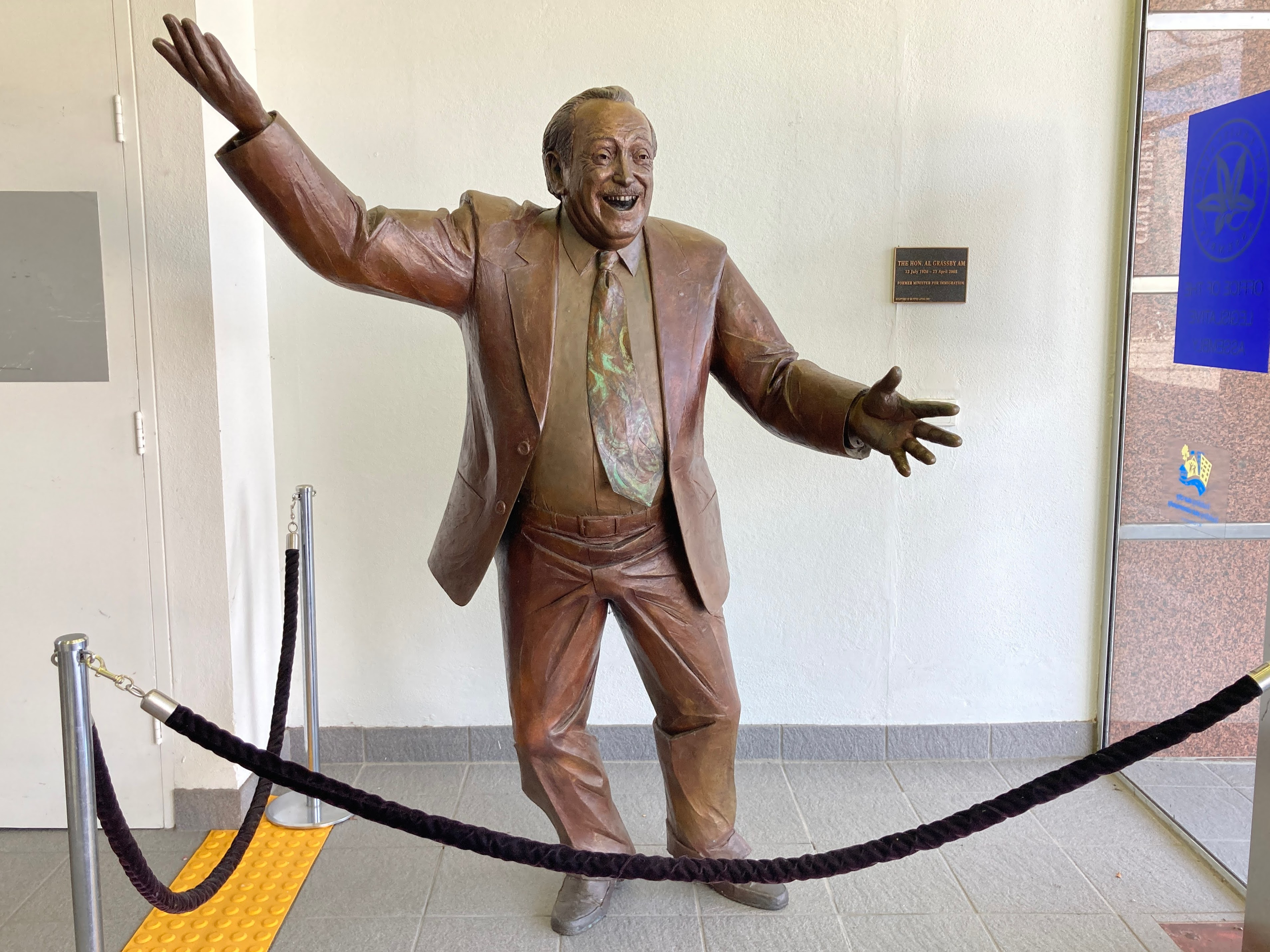
The statue of Al Grassby in Canberra

Al Grassby, who had been treated for cancer, died on 23 April 2005, two days after suffering a heart attack, after several months' pneumonia. He was survived by his wife Ellnor Grassby and his daughter Gabriella Davis, and his partner of 25 years, Angela Chan.

After Grassby's death, a number of revelations were made in the media, particularly in relation to his links with the Calabrian Mafia (known as the 'Ndrangheta) in Griffith and to the events surrounding the murder of Donald Mackay. Beginning on 9 May 2005, the Melbourne Herald Sun ran a series of articles alleging that Grassby used his influence to thwart a National Crime Authority investigation into the Mafia, and to "let mafia criminals into Australia", and that he was "paid to do the mafia's bidding", including receiving a $40,000 payment from the Griffith Mafia to smear Barbara Mackay.

Giafranco Tizzoni, a Mafia supergrass, identified Grassby as being at the "beck and call" of the Calabrian Mafia for at least 40 years. According to the National Crime Authority, the Mafia funded Grassby's election campaigns. One of Al Grassby's closest associates was Toni Sergi, the man identified in court and in Parliament as the Mafia leader who ordered the execution of Donald Mackay.

A decision, in 2007, by the Australian Capital Territory's Labor Chief Minister Jon Stanhope to erect a statue of Al Grassby in Canberra has been the subject of some controversy. Grassby's various criminal connections were featured in the television crime drama Underbelly.

New South Wales Legislative Assembly
Preceded by George Enticknap	Member for Murrumbidgee; 1965–1969	Succeeded by Lin Gordon
Parliament of Australia
Preceded by Bill Armstrong	Member for Riverina; 1969–1974	Succeeded by John Sullivan
Political offices
Preceded by Lance Barnard	Minister for Immigration; 1972–1974	Succeeded by Clyde Cameron
