= Electoral district of Murrumbidgee =

Former state electoral district of New South Wales, Australia

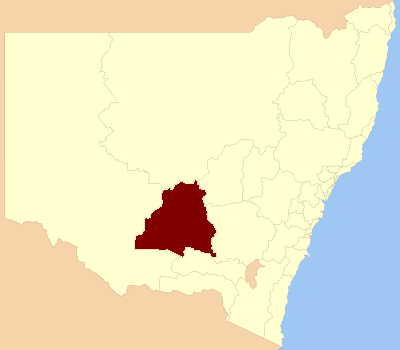
Location in New South Wales in 2007

Murrumbidgee is a former electoral district of the Legislative Assembly in the Australian state of New South Wales, named after the Murrumbidgee River. It existed in various forms from the creation of the Legislative Assembly in 1856 until its abolition in 2015.

== History ==
Until its abolition, Murrumbidgee and Parramatta were the only electorates to have existed continuously since the first Legislative Assembly election in 1856, although before 1913 it was called The Murrumbidgee. It elected two members between 1856 and 1859, one member between 1859 and 1880, two members between 1880 and 1885, three members between 1885 and 1894 and one member between 1894 and 1920. Voters cast a vote for each vacancy. Between 1920 and 1927, it absorbed parts of Lachlan and Ashburnham and elected three members under proportional representation. From 1927 until its abolition at the 2015 election, it elected one member.

At the 2007 election it included most of Junee Shire (including Junee, Wantabadgery, Harefield, Old Junee and Junee Reefs) Temora Shire, Coolamon Shire, Bland Shire, part of Lachlan Shire (including Condobolin, Lake Cargelligo and Burcher), Narrandera Shire, Leeton Shire, the City of Griffith, Murrumbidgee Shire and part of Carrathool Shire (including Rankins Springs and Carrathool).

Murrumbidgee was abolished at the 2015 election with the recreated electoral district of Cootamundra absorbing Junee Shire, Temora Shire, Coolamon Shire, Bland Shire and Narrandera Shire, the recreated electoral district of Murray absorbing Leeton Shire, the City of Griffith, Murrumbidgee Shire and Carrathool and the Electoral district of Barwon absorbing Lachlan Shire.

== Members for Murrumbidgee ==
Two members (1856–1859)
Member	Party	Term	Member	Party	Term			
John Hay	None	1856–1859	George Macleay	None	1856–1859			
Single-member (1859–1880)
Member	Party	Term						
William Macleay	None	1859–1874						
William Forster	None	1875–1876						
Joseph Leary	None	1876–1880						
Two members (1880–1885)
Member	Party	Term	Member	Party	Term			
James Douglas	None	1880–1882	George Loughnan	None	1880–1885			
Auber Jones	None	1882–1885	George Loughnan	None	1880–1885			
Three members (1885–1894)
Member	Party	Term	Member	Party	Term	Member	Party	Term
James Gormly	None	1885–1887	George Dibbs	None	1885–1887	Alexander Bolton	None	1885–1887
James Gormly	Protectionist	1887–1894	George Dibbs	Ind. Free Trade	1887–1889	John Gale	Protectionist	1887–1889
James Gormly	Protectionist	1887–1894	George Dibbs	Protectionist	1889–1894	David Copland	Protectionist	1889–1891
James Gormly	Protectionist	1887–1894	George Dibbs	Protectionist	1889–1894	Arthur Rae	Labor	1891–1894
James Gormly	Protectionist	1887–1894	George Dibbs	Protectionist	1889–1894	Arthur Rae	Independent Labor	1894–1894
Single-member (1894–1920)
Member	Party	Term						
Thomas Fitzpatrick	Protectionist	1894–1901						
Thomas Fitzpatrick	Progressive	1901–1904						
Patrick McGarry	Labor	1904–1917						
Patrick McGarry	Nationalist	1917–1920						
Patrick McGarry	Ind. Nationalist	1920–1920						
Three members (1920–1927)
Member	Party	Term	Member	Party	Term	Member	Party	Term
Arthur Grimm	Nationalist	1920–1925	Ernest Buttenshaw	Progressive	1920–1925	Martin Flannery	Labor	1920–1927
Edmund Best	Nationalist	1925–1927	Ernest Buttenshaw	Country	1925–1927	Martin Flannery	Labor	1920–1927
Single-member (1927–2015)
Member	Party	Term						
Martin Flannery	Labor	1927–1932						
Robert Hankinson	Country	1932–1941						
George Enticknap	Independent Labor	1941–1944						
George Enticknap	Labor	1944–1965						
Al Grassby	Labor	1965–1969						
Lin Gordon	Labor	1970–1984						
Adrian Cruickshank	National	1984–1999						
Adrian Piccoli	National	1999–2015						

== Election results ==
2011 New South Wales state election: Murrumbidgee
Party	Candidate	Votes	%	±%
National	Adrian Piccoli	31,414	73.4	+10.2
Labor	William Wood	8,431	19.7	−12.2
Greens	George Benedyka	1,577	3.7	−1.2
Christian Democrats	Fiona Bushby	1,362	3.2	+3.2
Total formal votes		42,784	97.6	−0.2
Informal votes		1,070	2.4	+0.2
Turnout		43,854	92.1	
Two-party-preferred result
National	Adrian Piccoli	32,260	77.9	+11.8
Labor	William Wood	9,149	22.1	−11.8
National hold		Swing	+11.8	
