= Electoral results for the district of Newcastle =

Election results for Newcastle, New South Wales, Australia

Newcastle, an electoral district of the Legislative Assembly in the Australian state of New South Wales, has had two incarnations, from 1859 until 1894 and from 1904 to the present.

First incarnation (1859–1894)
Election	Member	Party								
1859	Arthur Hodgson	None								
1860	James Hannell	None								
1864–65	James Hannell	None								
1869–70	George Lloyd	None								
1872 by	George Lloyd	None								
1874–75	George Lloyd	None								
1877	Richard Bowker	None	Member	Party						
1880	James Fletcher	None	George Lloyd	None						
1882	James Fletcher	None	James Ellis	None						
1885	James Fletcher	None	George Lloyd	None						
1887	James Fletcher	Protectionist	James Ellis	Free Trade	Member	Party				
1889	James Fletcher	Protectionist	Alexander Brown	Protectionist	William Grahame	Protectionist				
1889 by	James Fletcher	Protectionist	Alexander Brown	Protectionist	James Curley	Free Trade				
1891 by	William Grahame	Protectionist	Alexander Brown	Protectionist	James Curley	Free Trade				
1891	William Grahame	Protectionist	David Scott	Labor	John Fegan	Labor				
Second incarnation (1904–present)
Election	Member	Party								
1904	William Dick	Liberal Reform								
1907	Owen Gilbert	Liberal Reform								
1910	Arthur Gardiner	Labor								
1913	Arthur Gardiner	Labor								
1917	Arthur Gardiner	Independent Labor	Member	Party	Member	Party	Member	Party	Member	Party
1920	Arthur Gardiner	Independent	John Estell	Labor	John Fegan	Nationalist	William Kearsley	Labor	Hugh Connell	Labor
1921 appt	Arthur Gardiner	Independent	John Estell	Labor	John Fegan	Nationalist	David Murray	Labor	Hugh Connell	Labor
1922	Walter Skelton	Independent	Jack Baddeley	Labor	Magnus Cromarty	Nationalist	David Murray	Labor	Hugh Connell	Labor
1925	Walter Skelton	Protestant Labour	Jack Baddeley	Labor	George Booth	Labor	David Murray	Labor	Hugh Connell	Labor
1927	Peter Connolly	Labor								
1930	Peter Connolly	Labor								
1932	Peter Connolly	Labor								
1935	Frank Hawkins	Labor								
1938	Frank Hawkins	Labor								
1941	Frank Hawkins	Labor								
1944	Frank Hawkins	Labor								
1947	Frank Hawkins	Labor								
1950	Frank Hawkins	Labor								
1953	Frank Hawkins	Labor								
1956	Frank Hawkins	Labor								
1959	Frank Hawkins	Labor								
1962	Frank Hawkins	Labor								
1965	Frank Hawkins	Labor								
1968	Arthur Wade	Labor								
1971	Arthur Wade	Labor								
1973	Arthur Wade	Labor								
1976	Arthur Wade	Labor								
1978	Arthur Wade	Labor								
1981	Arthur Wade	Labor								
1984	Arthur Wade	Labor								
1988	George Keegan	Independent								
1991	Bryce Gaudry	Labor								
1995	Bryce Gaudry	Labor								
1999	Bryce Gaudry	Labor								
2003	Bryce Gaudry	Labor								
2007	Jodi McKay	Labor								
2011	Tim Owen	Liberal								
2014 by	Tim Crakanthorp	Labor								
2015	Tim Crakanthorp	Labor								
2019	Tim Crakanthorp	Labor								
2023	Tim Crakanthorp	Labor								

== Election results ==
=== Elections in the 2020s ===
==== 2023 ====
2023 New South Wales state election: Newcastle
Party	Candidate	Votes	%	±%
Labor	Tim Crakanthorp	25,078	49.4	+3.6
Liberal	Thomas Triebsees	11,348	22.4	−4.1
Greens	John Mackenzie	9,487	18.7	+2.0
Legalise Cannabis	Tim Claydon	3,042	6.0	+6.0
Sustainable Australia	Freya Taylor	1,195	2.4	0.0
Socialist Alliance	Niko Leka	586	1.2	−0.6
Total formal votes		50,736	97.8	+1.0
Informal votes		1,162	2.2	−1.0
Turnout		51,898	87.3	+0.4
Two-party-preferred result
Labor	Tim Crakanthorp	33,422	72.6	+5.1
Liberal	Thomas Triebsees	12,620	27.4	−5.1
Labor hold		Swing	+5.1	

=== Elections in the 2010s ===
==== 2019 ====
2019 New South Wales state election: Newcastle
Party	Candidate	Votes	%	±%
Labor	Tim Crakanthorp	23,231	46.17	+6.03
Liberal	Blake Keating	13,224	26.28	−9.20
Greens	Charlotte McCabe	8,281	16.46	−1.87
Animal Justice	Sean Bremner Young	1,478	2.94	+2.94
Sustainable Australia	Beverley Jelfs	1,219	2.42	+2.42
Small Business	Glen Fredericks	1,178	2.34	+2.34
Socialist Alliance	Steve O'Brien	854	1.70	+0.45
Keep Sydney Open	Claudia Looker	854	1.70	+1.70
Total formal votes		50,319	96.73	+0.40
Informal votes		1,703	3.27	−0.40
Turnout		52,022	87.99	−2.35
Two-party-preferred result
Labor	Tim Crakanthorp	29,843	67.70	+10.33
Liberal	Blake Keating	14,236	32.30	−10.33
Labor hold		Swing	+10.33	

==== 2015 ====
2015 New South Wales state election: Newcastle
Party	Candidate	Votes	%	±%
Labor	Tim Crakanthorp	19,324	40.1	+9.1
Liberal	Karen Howard	17,082	35.5	−1.7
Greens	Michael Osborne	8,824	18.3	+3.3
Cyclists	Sam Reich	817	1.7	+1.7
Christian Democrats	Milton Caine	787	1.6	+0.3
No Land Tax	Jasmin Addison	714	1.5	+1.5
Socialist Alliance	Steve O'Brien	601	1.2	−0.2
Total formal votes		48,149	96.3	−0.4
Informal votes		1,837	3.7	+0.4
Turnout		49,986	90.3	+1.1
Two-party-preferred result
Labor	Tim Crakanthorp	24,384	57.4	+9.8
Liberal	Karen Howard	18,116	42.6	−9.8
Labor hold		Swing	+9.8	

==== 2014 by-election ====
2014 Newcastle state by-election
Party	Candidate	Votes	%	±%
Labor	Tim Crakanthorp	15,253	36.9	+6.3
Independent	Karen Howard	10,796	26.1	+26.1
Greens	Michael Osborne	8,236	19.9	+5.1
Independent	Jacqueline Haines	3,019	7.3	+7.3
Palmer United	Jennifer Stefanac	1,332	3.2	+3.2
Socialist Alliance	Steve O'Brien	1,086	2.6	+1.0
Christian Democrats	Milton Caine	834	2.0	+1.2
Independent	Brian Buckley Clare	762	1.8	+1.8
Total formal votes		41,318	94.7	−2.5
Informal votes		2,327	5.3	+2.5
Turnout		43,645	80.6	−11.8
Two-candidate-preferred result
Labor	Tim Crakanthorp	18,785	58.7	+11.2
Independent	Karen Howard	13,243	41.3	+41.3
Labor gain from Liberal				

Tim Owen (Liberal / Independent) resigned.

==== 2011 ====
2011 New South Wales state election: Newcastle
Party	Candidate	Votes	%	±%
Liberal	Tim Owen	16,072	36.7	+26.9
Labor	Jodi McKay	13,417	30.6	−0.6
Greens	John Sutton	6,510	14.9	+3.6
Independent	John Tate	5,067	11.6	−12.5
Progressive Labour	Rod Noble	1,372	3.1	+3.1
Socialist Alliance	Zane Alcorn	700	1.6	+1.6
Christian Democrats	Milton Caine	496	1.1	−0.1
Socialist Equality	Noel Holt	189	0.4	+0.2
Total formal votes		43,823	97.2	−0.4
Informal votes		1,264	2.8	+0.4
Turnout		45,087	92.4	+1.4
Two-party-preferred result
Liberal	Tim Owen	19,337	52.6	+52.6
Labor	Jodi McKay	17,459	47.4	−3.8
Liberal gain from Labor		Swing	N/A	

=== Elections in the 2000s ===
==== 2007 ====
2007 New South Wales state election: Newcastle
Party	Candidate	Votes	%	±%
Labor	Jodi McKay	13,166	31.2	−17.1
Independent	John Tate	10,159	24.1	+24.1
Independent	Bryce Gaudry (Note: Bryce Gaudry was the Labor member for Newcastle from 1991 to 2007. When Jodi McKay was preselected at the request of the Premier, he left Labor and contested the election as an Independent.)	8,870	21.0	+21.0
Greens	Michael Osborne	4,729	11.2	−4.2
Liberal	Martin Babakhan	4,129	9.8	−16.4
Christian Democrats	John Lee	535	1.3	−0.4
Independent	Simon Hutabarat	306	0.7	+0.7
Independent	Hilda Armstrong	168	0.4	+0.4
Independent	Noel Holt	110	0.3	+0.3
Total formal votes		42,172	97.6	+0.4
Informal votes		1,033	2.4	−0.4
Turnout		43,205	91.1	
Notional two-party-preferred count
Labor	Jodi McKay	18,627	67.8	+2.5
Liberal	Martin Babakhan	8,833	32.2	−2.5
Two-candidate-preferred result
Labor	Jodi McKay	16,311	51.2	−14.2
Independent	John Tate	15,524	48.8	+48.8
Labor hold		Swing	N/A	

==== 2003 ====
2003 New South Wales state election: Newcastle
Party	Candidate	Votes	%	±%
Labor	Bryce Gaudry	19,139	48.0	−5.1
Liberal	David Parker	10,654	26.7	+6.6
Greens	Ian McKenzie	6,054	15.2	+5.2
Independent	Harry Williams	1,427	3.6	+3.6
One Nation	Gladys Gander	960	2.4	−6.1
Democrats	Brett Paterson	885	2.2	−2.2
Christian Democrats	Elaine Battersby	652	1.6	+1.6
Unity	Nawal Sami	89	0.2	+0.0
Total formal votes		39,860	97.3	−0.1
Informal votes		1,109	2.7	+0.1
Turnout		40,969	90.7	
Two-party-preferred result
Labor	Bryce Gaudry	22,200	64.8	−7.6
Liberal	David Parker	12,035	35.2	+7.6
Labor hold		Swing	−7.6	

=== Elections in the 1990s ===
==== 1999 ====
1999 New South Wales state election: Newcastle
Party	Candidate	Votes	%	±%
Labor	Bryce Gaudry	21,644	53.1	−3.7
Liberal	David Williams	8,208	20.1	−8.6
Greens	Ian McKenzie	4,062	10.0	−2.7
One Nation	Sharyn Brooks	3,468	8.5	+8.5
Democrats	Stephen Bisgrove	1,802	4.4	+4.4
Independent	Harry Criticos	899	2.2	+2.2
Democratic Socialist	Geoff Payne	343	0.8	−0.9
Socialist Equality	Terry Cook	163	0.4	+0.4
Unity	Chris Brookman	101	0.2	+0.2
Citizens Electoral Council	Dennis Chaston	77	0.2	+0.2
Total formal votes		40,767	97.4	+2.6
Informal votes		1,101	2.6	−2.6
Turnout		41,868	93.0	
Two-party-preferred result
Labor	Bryce Gaudry	24,925	72.4	+5.5
Liberal	David Williams	9,510	27.6	−5.5
Labor hold		Swing	+5.5	

==== 1995 ====
1995 New South Wales state election: Newcastle
Party	Candidate	Votes	%	±%
Labor	Bryce Gaudry	17,360	54.9	+4.8
Liberal	Suzanne Fleming	9,162	29.0	+8.3
Greens	Carrie Jacobi	4,370	13.8	+13.8
Democratic Socialist	Kamala Emanuel	736	2.3	+2.3
Total formal votes		31,628	95.2	+2.6
Informal votes		1,596	4.8	−2.6
Turnout		33,224	92.8	
Two-party-preferred result
Labor	Bryce Gaudry	20,107	66.1	+3.7
Liberal	Suzanne Fleming	10,310	33.9	+33.9
Labor hold		Swing	+3.7	

==== 1991 ====
1991 New South Wales state election: Newcastle
Party	Candidate	Votes	%	±%
Labor	Bryce Gaudry	15,858	50.1	+10.3
Independent	George Keegan	6,635	21.0	−5.9
Liberal	Colin Cookson	6,533	20.6	+0.3
Democrats	Anne Moulston	1,842	5.8	+5.8
Call to Australia	Jim Kendall	474	1.5	+1.5
Independent	Con Forster	304	1.0	+1.0
Total formal votes		31,646	92.6	−4.4
Informal votes		2,539	7.4	+4.4
Turnout		34,185	94.4	
Two-candidate-preferred result
Labor	Bryce Gaudry	17,274	62.4	+14.7
Independent	George Keegan	10,425	37.6	−14.7
Labor gain from Independent		Swing	+14.7	

=== Elections in the 1980s ===
==== 1988 ====
1988 New South Wales state election: Newcastle
Party	Candidate	Votes	%	±%
Labor	Denis Nichols	11,074	37.8	−22.1
Independent	George Keegan	9,512	32.5	+32.5
Liberal	Ashley Saunders	5,389	18.4	−13.2
Independent	Margaret Henry	3,307	11.3	+11.3
Total formal votes		29,282	96.9	−0.6
Informal votes		952	3.1	+0.6
Turnout		30,234	93.8	
Two-candidate-preferred result
Independent	George Keegan	15,134	55.3	+55.3
Labor	Denis Nichols	12,229	44.7	−19.8
Independent gain from Labor		Swing	+55.3	

==== 1984 ====
1984 New South Wales state election: Newcastle
Party	Candidate	Votes	%	±%
Labor	Arthur Wade	18,143	57.0	−7.9
Liberal	Patricia Forsythe	9,195	28.9	−0.4
Democrats	Stephen Jeffries	3,721	11.7	+11.7
Independent	Frank Blefari	772	2.4	+2.4
Total formal votes		31,831	97.6	+1.2
Informal votes		770	2.4	−1.2
Turnout		32,601	92.5	+1.0
Two-party-preferred result
Labor	Arthur Wade		64.4	−6.5
Liberal	Patricia Forsythe		35.6	+6.5
Labor hold		Swing	−6.5	

==== 1981 ====
1981 New South Wales state election: Newcastle
Party	Candidate	Votes	%	±%
Labor	Arthur Wade	19,279	64.9	−3.8
Liberal	Alex Bevan	8,458	28.5	−2.8
Communist	Kay Wicks	1,987	6.7	+6.7
Total formal votes		29,724	96.4	
Informal votes		1,107	3.6	
Turnout		30,831	91.5	
Two-party-preferred result
Labor	Arthur Wade	20,708	70.9	+2.2
Liberal	Alex Bevan	8,508	29.1	−2.2
Labor hold		Swing	+2.2	

=== Elections in the 1970s ===
==== 1978 ====
1978 New South Wales state election: Newcastle
Party	Candidate	Votes	%	±%
Labor	Arthur Wade	18,023	72.3	+4.6
Liberal	Elaine Samuels	6,921	27.7	−4.6
Total formal votes		24,944	97.7	−0.5
Informal votes		579	2.3	+0.5
Turnout		25,523	93.4	−0.5
Labor hold		Swing	+4.6	

==== 1976 ====
1976 New South Wales state election: Newcastle
Party	Candidate	Votes	%	±%
Labor	Arthur Wade	17,857	67.7	+9.1
Liberal	Arthur Thomas	8,514	32.3	+1.6
Total formal votes		26,371	98.2	+0.6
Informal votes		475	1.8	−0.6
Turnout		26,846	93.9	−0.1
Labor hold		Swing	+4.8	

==== 1973 ====
1973 New South Wales state election: Newcastle
Party	Candidate	Votes	%	±%
Labor	Arthur Wade	15,241	58.6	−0.2
Liberal	Richard Bevan	7,994	30.7	−4.4
Australia	Peter Baldwin	1,903	7.3	+4.2
Democratic Labor	Charin Godfrey	872	3.4	+0.4
Total formal votes		26,010	97.6	
Informal votes		631	2.4	
Turnout		26,641	94.0	
Two-party-preferred result
Labor	Arthur Wade	16,367	62.9	+1.3
Liberal	Richard Bevan	9,643	37.1	−1.3
Labor hold		Swing	+1.3	

==== 1971 ====
1971 New South Wales state election: Newcastle
Party	Candidate	Votes	%	±%
Labor	Arthur Wade	14,892	58.8	+11.2
Liberal	Malcolm Barnes	8,883	35.1	+7.5
Australia	Wlodzimierz Bohatko	795	3.1	+3.1
Democratic Labor	Gerard Collins	769	3.0	+3.0
Total formal votes		25,339	98.3	
Informal votes		450	1.7	
Turnout		25,789	93.6	
Two-party-preferred result
Labor	Arthur Wade	15,523	61.3	+7.0
Liberal	Malcolm Barnes	9,816	38.7	−7.0
Labor hold		Swing	+7.0	

=== Elections in the 1960s ===
==== 1968 ====
1968 New South Wales state election: Newcastle
Party	Candidate	Votes	%	±%
Labor	Arthur Wade	9,960	47.6	−12.8
Liberal	Malcolm Barnes	5,790	27.6	−7.4
Independent	Douglas McDougall	5,190	24.8	+24.8
Total formal votes		20,940	98.1	
Informal votes		397	1.9	
Turnout		21,337	94.6	
Two-party-preferred result
Labor	Arthur Wade	11,361	54.3	−9.8
Liberal	Malcolm Barnes	9,579	45.7	+9.8
Labor hold		Swing	−9.8	

==== 1965 ====
1965 New South Wales state election: Newcastle
Party	Candidate	Votes	%	±%
Labor	Frank Hawkins	10,471	60.4	−1.9
Liberal	Stewart Mordue	6,065	35.0	+1.3
Communist	Mervyn Copley	798	4.6	+0.6
Total formal votes		17,334	98.6	−0.2
Informal votes		252	1.4	+0.2
Turnout		17,586	93.2	+0.1
Two-party-preferred result
Labor	Frank Hawkins	11,109	64.1	−1.4
Liberal	Stewart Mordue	6,225	35.9	+1.4
Labor hold		Swing	−1.4	

==== 1962 ====
1962 New South Wales state election: Newcastle
Party	Candidate	Votes	%	±%
Labor	Frank Hawkins	11,642	62.3	−2.2
Liberal	Kevin Doyle	6,310	33.7	+2.3
Communist	Mervyn Copley	750	4.0	−0.1
Total formal votes		18,702	98.8	
Informal votes		232	1.2	
Turnout		18,934	93.1	
Two-party-preferred result
Labor	Frank Hawkins	12,242	65.5	−2.3
Liberal	Kevin Doyle	6,460	34.5	+2.3
Labor hold		Swing	−2.3	

=== Elections in the 1950s ===
==== 1959 ====
1959 New South Wales state election: Newcastle
Party	Candidate	Votes	%	±%
Labor	Frank Hawkins	12,239	64.5	
Liberal	William Hutchinson	5,950	31.4	
Communist	Mervyn Copley	777	4.1	
Total formal votes		18,966	98.5	
Informal votes		286	1.5	
Turnout		19,252	93.9	
Two-party-preferred result
Labor	Frank Hawkins	12,861	67.8	
Liberal	William Hutchinson	6,105	32.2	
Labor hold		Swing		

==== 1956 ====
1956 New South Wales state election: Newcastle
Party	Candidate	Votes	%	±%
Labor	Frank Hawkins	10,358	66.5	−26.1
Liberal	Iris Hyde	4,410	28.3	+28.3
Communist	Mervyn Copley	819	5.2	−2.2
Total formal votes		15,587	98.5	+3.6
Informal votes		239	1.5	−3.6
Turnout		15,826	93.8	−0.9
Two-party-preferred result
Labor	Frank Hawkins	11,095	71.2	−21.4
Liberal	Iris Hyde	4,492	28.8	+28.8
Labor hold		Swing	N/A	

==== 1953 ====
1953 New South Wales state election: Newcastle
Party	Candidate	Votes	%	±%
Labor	Frank Hawkins	14,970	92.6	
Communist	Douglas Olive	1,202	7.4	
Total formal votes		16,172	94.9	
Informal votes		866	5.1	
Turnout		17,038	94.7	
Labor hold		Swing		

==== 1950 ====
1950 New South Wales state election: Newcastle
Party	Candidate	Votes	%	±%
Labor	Frank Hawkins	12,240	68.6	
Liberal	Eric Cupit	4,916	27.5	
Communist	Laurie Aarons	694	3.9	
Total formal votes		17,850	98.8	
Informal votes		214	1.2	
Turnout		18,064	94.9	
Two-party-preferred result
Labor	Frank Hawkins		70.0 (Note: Two party preferred vote was estimated.)	
Liberal	Eric Cupit		30.0	
Labor hold		Swing		

=== Elections in the 1940s ===
==== 1947 ====
1947 New South Wales state election: Newcastle
Party	Candidate	Votes	%	±%
Labor	Frank Hawkins	15,809	65.8	−15.7
Liberal	Trebor Edmunds	8,221	34.2	+34.2
Total formal votes		24,030	98.6	+3.7
Informal votes		335	1.4	−3.7
Turnout		24,365	95.0	+3.5
Labor hold		Swing	N/A	

==== 1944 ====
1944 New South Wales state election: Newcastle
Party	Candidate	Votes	%	±%
Labor	Frank Hawkins	17,673	81.5	+6.7
Lang Labor	Thomas Malone	4,021	18.5	+18.5
Total formal votes		21,694	94.9	−2.9
Informal votes		1,167	5.1	+2.9
Turnout		22,861	91.5	−1.3
Labor hold		Swing	N/A	

==== 1941 ====
1941 New South Wales state election: Newcastle
Party	Candidate	Votes	%	±%
Labor	Frank Hawkins	16,205	74.8	
Independent	Claude Dalby	2,849	13.1	
State Labor	Charles McCaffrey	2,621	12.1	
Total formal votes		21,675	97.8	
Informal votes		489	2.2	
Turnout		22,164	92.8	
Labor hold		Swing		

- Preferences were not distributed.

=== Elections in the 1930s ===
==== 1938 ====
1938 New South Wales state election: Newcastle
Party	Candidate	Votes	%	±%
Labor	Frank Hawkins	13,946	70.9	+19.3
Independent	Claude Dalby	5,735	29.1	+29.1
Total formal votes		19,681	96.7	+1.1
Informal votes		674	3.3	−1.1
Turnout		20,355	95.3	−0.8
Labor hold		Swing	N/A	

==== 1935 ====
1935 New South Wales state election: Newcastle
Party	Candidate	Votes	%	±%
Labor (NSW)	Frank Hawkins	9,640	51.6	−1.3
Independent Labor	Hugh Sutherland	3,774	20.2	+20.2
Federal Labor	William Nye	3,652	19.5	+13.5
Communist	Frederick Dodd	1,624	8.7	+6.7
Total formal votes		18,690	95.6	−1.8
Informal votes		854	4.4	+1.8
Turnout		19,544	96.1	−0.9
Labor (NSW) hold		Swing	N/A	

- Preferences were not distributed.

==== 1932 ====
1932 New South Wales state election: Newcastle
Party	Candidate	Votes	%	±%
Labor (NSW)	Peter Connolly	9,470	52.9	−17.0
United Australia	Charles Parker	6,904	38.6	+13.8
Federal Labor	Hugh Sutherland	1,068	6.0	+6.0
Communist	Catherine Barratt	350	2.0	+1.0
Independent	Elizabeth Robinson	76	0.4	+0.4
Independent	Clarence Martin	24	0.1	+0.1
Total formal votes		17,892	97.4	−0.3
Informal votes		477	2.6	+0.3
Turnout		18,369	97.0	+1.8
Labor (NSW) hold		Swing	N/A	

- Preferences were not distributed.

==== 1930 ====
1930 New South Wales state election: Newcastle
Party	Candidate	Votes	%	±%
Labor	Peter Connolly	12,137	69.9	
Nationalist	Alfred Goninan	4,303	24.8	
Australian	Henry Short	742	4.3	
Communist	John Simpson	176	1.0	
Total formal votes		17,358	97.7	
Informal votes		415	2.3	
Turnout		17,773	95.2	
Labor hold		Swing		

=== Elections in the 1920s ===
==== 1927 ====
This section is an excerpt from 1927 New South Wales state election § Newcastle

1927 New South Wales state election: Newcastle
Party	Candidate	Votes	%	±%
Labor	Peter Connolly	7,644	58.5	
Nationalist	George Waller	3,969	30.4	
Independent	Walter Baxter	1,457	11.2	
Total formal votes		13,070	99.0	
Informal votes		129	1.0	
Turnout		13,199	83.3	
Labor win		(new seat)		

==== 1925 ====
This section is an excerpt from 1925 New South Wales state election § Newcastle

1925 New South Wales state election: Newcastle
Party	Candidate	Votes	%	±%
Quota		9,602		
Labor	Jack Baddeley (elected 1)	16,394	28.5	+5.8
Labor	David Murray (elected 3)	9,941	17.3	+4.6
Labor	Hugh Connell (elected 4)	5,698	9.9	+2.9
Labor	George Booth (elected 5)	2,336	4.1	+4.1
Labor	David Davies	2,157	3.7	+3.7
Protestant Labour	Walter Skelton (elected 2)	10,194	17.7	−7.5
Protestant Labour	James Pendlebury	405	0.7	+0.7
Protestant Labour	James Hestelow	344	0.6	+0.6
Nationalist	Magnus Cromarty (defeated)	6,270	10.9	+5.5
Nationalist	John Fegan	578	1.0	−2.1
Nationalist	David Murray	431	0.7	+0.7
Nationalist	Charles Watt	343	0.6	+0.6
Nationalist	Oliver Denny	110	0.2	+0.2
Independent	Arthur Gardiner	2,238	3.9	+3.9
Independent	Robert Mitchell	167	0.3	+0.3
Total formal votes		57,606	96.3	−0.4
Informal votes		2,180	3.7	+0.4
Turnout		59,786	75.5	+0.3
Party total votes
Labor		36,526	63.4	+13.5
Protestant Labour		10,943	19.0	+19.0
Nationalist		7,732	13.4	−0.5
Independent	Arthur Gardiner	2,238	3.9	+3.9
Independent	Robert Mitchell	167	0.3	+0.3

==== 1922 ====
This section is an excerpt from 1922 New South Wales state election § Newcastle

1922 New South Wales state election: Newcastle
Party	Candidate	Votes	%	±%
Quota		8,688		
Labor	Jack Baddeley (elected 2)	11,850	22.7	+22.7
Labor	David Murray (elected 4)	6,629	12.7	+6.2
Labor	Hugh Connell (elected 3)	3,646	7.0	−13.5
Labor	David Watson	2,356	4.5	+4.5
Labor	Amram Lewis	1,529	2.9	−1.3
Independent	Walter Skelton (elected 1)	13,132	25.2	+25.2
Nationalist	Magnus Cromarty (elected 5)	2,833	5.4	+5.4
Nationalist	John Fegan (defeated)	1,602	3.1	−3.3
Nationalist	Harry Wheeler	1,260	2.4	+2.4
Nationalist	Robert Kilgour	1,052	2.0	+2.0
Nationalist	Kenneth Mathieson	516	1.0	+1.0
Independent Labor	Arthur Gardiner (defeated)	4,644	8.9	−8.8
Independent	Thomas Hoare	566	1.1	+1.1
Progressive	George Jenner	295	0.6	+0.6
Progressive	John Cram	151	0.3	+0.3
Independent	James Gilligan	38	0.1	+0.1
Independent	William Jeffery	27	0.1	+0.1
Total formal votes		52,126	96.7	+9.3
Informal votes		1,771	3.3	−9.3
Turnout		53,897	75.2	+16.1
Party total votes
Labor		26,010	49.9	−7.6
Independent	Walter Skelton	13,132	25.2	+25.2
Nationalist		7,263	13.9	+1.0
Independent Labor	Arthur Gardiner	4,644	8.9	−8.8
Independent	Thomas Hoare	566	1.1	+1.1
Progressive		446	0.9	−2.3
Independent	James Gilligan	38	0.1	+0.1
Independent	William Jeffery	27	0.1	+0.1

==== 1921 appointment ====
William Kearsley died on 19 June 1921. Between 1920 and 1927 the Legislative Assembly was elected using a form of proportional representation with multi-member seats and a single transferable vote (modified Hare-Clark). The Parliamentary Elections (Casual Vacancies) Act, provided that casual vacancies were filled by the next unsuccessful candidate on the incumbent member's party list. David Murray had the most votes of the unsuccessful Labor candidates at the 1920 election and took his seat on 30 August 1921.

==== 1920 ====
This section is an excerpt from 1920 New South Wales state election § Newcastle

1920 New South Wales state election: Newcastle
Party	Candidate	Votes	%	±%
Quota		5,475		
Labor	Hugh Connell (elected 1)	6,720	20.5	
Labor	John Estell (elected 3)	4,998	15.2	
Labor	William Kearsley (elected 4)	3,641	11.1	
Labor	David Murray	2,145	6.5	
Labor	Amram Lewis	1,381	4.2	
Independent	Arthur Gardiner (elected 2)	5,821	17.7	
Nationalist	John Fegan (elected 5)	2,113	6.4	
Nationalist	John Paton	1,840	5.6	
Nationalist	George O'Brien	289	0.9	
Progressive	Roland Green	1,064	3.2	
Democratic	Robert Mackenzie	947	2.9	
Ind. Nationalist	William C Grahame (defeated)	898	2.7	
Socialist Labor	Joseph Charlton	564	1.7	
Socialist Labor	David McNeill	140	0.4	
Socialist Labor	Thomas Johnston	68	0.2	
Socialist Labor	John McDonald	62	0.2	
Socialist Labor	William North	53	0.2	
Independent	Michael Dillon	91	0.3	
Independent	John Kingsborough	13	0.1	
Total formal votes		32,848	87.6	
Informal votes		4,648	12.4	
Turnout		37,496	59.1	
Party total votes
Labor		18,885	57.5	
Independent	Arthur Gardiner	5,821	17.7	
Nationalist		4,242	12.9	
Progressive		1,064	3.2	
Democratic		947	2.9	
Ind. Nationalist	William C Grahame	898	2.7	
Socialist Labor		887	2.7	
Independent	Michael Dillon	91	0.3	
Independent	John Kingsborough	13	0.1	

=== Elections in the 1910s ===
==== 1917 ====
This section is an excerpt from 1917 New South Wales state election § Newcastle

1917 New South Wales state election: Newcastle
Party	Candidate	Votes	%	±%
Independent Labor	Arthur Gardiner	5,303	69.2	+69.2
Labor	Francis McCormack	2,358	30.8	−39.7
Total formal votes		7,661	99.3	+1.1
Informal votes		56	0.7	−1.1
Turnout		7,717	60.0	−9.6
Member changed to Independent Labor from Labor				

The sitting member Arthur Gardiner was expelled from Labor in the November 1916 Labor split over conscription.

==== 1913 ====
This section is an excerpt from 1913 New South Wales state election § Newcastle

1913 New South Wales state election: Newcastle
Party	Candidate	Votes	%	±%
Labor	Arthur Gardiner	5,702	70.5	
Liberal Reform	John Fegan	2,391	29.5	
Total formal votes		8,093	98.2	
Informal votes		150	1.8	
Turnout		8,243	69.6	
Labor hold				

==== 1910 ====
This section is an excerpt from 1910 New South Wales state election § Newcastle

1910 New South Wales state election: Newcastle
Party	Candidate	Votes	%	±%
Labour	Arthur Gardiner	3,203	54.9	+12.3
Liberal Reform	Owen Gilbert (defeated)	2,635	45.1	−12.3
Total formal votes		5,836	98.7	+1.8
Informal votes		79	1.3	−1.8
Turnout		5,917	75.0	+3.1
Labour gain from Liberal Reform				

=== Elections in the 1900s ===
==== 1907 ====
This section is an excerpt from 1907 New South Wales state election § Newcastle

1907 New South Wales state election: Newcastle
Party	Candidate	Votes	%	±%
Liberal Reform	Owen Gilbert	2,950	57.4	
Labour	Laurence Vial	2,186	42.6	
Total formal votes		5,136	96.9	
Informal votes		167	3.2	
Turnout		5,303	71.9	
Liberal Reform hold				

==== 1904 ====
This section is an excerpt from 1904 New South Wales state election § Newcastle

1904 New South Wales state election: Newcastle
Party	Candidate	Votes	%	±%
Liberal Reform	William Dick	2,477	50.5	
Independent	William Cann	2,429	49.5	
Total formal votes		4,906	99.3	
Informal votes		34	0.7	
Turnout		4,940	59.1	
Liberal Reform win		(new seat)		

Newcastle was a re-created seat that consisted of the abolished seat of Newcastle East and part of the abolished seat of Newcastle West. The member for Newcastle East was William Dick (Liberal Reform). The member for Newcastle West was Owen Gilbert (Liberal Reform) who unsuccessfully contested Wickham.

District re-established

==== 1894–1904 ====
District abolished

==== 1891 ====
This section is an excerpt from 1891 New South Wales colonial election § Newcastle

1891 New South Wales colonial election: Newcastle Wednesday 17 June
Party	Candidate	Votes	%	±%
Labour	David Scott (elected 1)	2,912	18.5	
Labour	John Fegan (elected 2)	2,882	18.3	
Protectionist	William Grahame (re-elected 3)	2,707	17.2	
Protectionist	Alexander Brown (defeated)	2,533	16.1	
Free Trade	James Curley (defeated)	2,504	15.9	
Protectionist	Thomas Hungerford	1,273	8.1	
Free Trade	George Webb	910	5.8	
Total formal votes		15,721	99.1	
Informal votes		141	0.9	
Turnout		5,979	76.9	
Labour gain 2 from Protectionist				
Protectionist hold 1				

James Curley (Free Trade) had won a seat from William Grahame (Protectionist) at the 1889 by-election. William Grahame regained a seat at the 1891 by-election following the death of James Fletcher (Protectionist).

==== 1891 by-election ====
1891 Newcastle by-election Tuesday 14 April
Party	Candidate	Votes	%	±%
Protectionist	William Grahame (elected)	2,081	45.6	
Labor	John Fegan	2,065	45.2	
Free Trade	Peter Bennett	420	9.2	
Total formal votes		4,566	98.5	
Informal votes		69	1.5	+0.1
Turnout		4,635	63.7	−0.5
Protectionist hold				

James Fletcher (Protectionist) died.

=== Elections in the 1880s ===
==== 1889 by-election ====
1889 Newcastle by-election Saturday 12 October
Party	Candidate	Votes	%	±%
Free Trade	James Curley (elected)	2,173	51.8	
Protectionist	William Grahame (defeated)	2,022	48.2	
Total formal votes		4,195	98.6	−0.8
Informal votes		61	1.4	+0.8
Turnout		4,256	64.2	−10.9
Free Trade gain from Protectionist				

William Grahame (Protectionist) resigned due to financial difficulties.

==== 1889 ====
This section is an excerpt from 1889 New South Wales colonial election § Newcastle

1889 New South Wales colonial election: Newcastle Saturday 2 February
Party	Candidate	Votes	%	±%
Protectionist	James Fletcher (elected 1)	2,657	19.3	
Protectionist	Alexander Brown (elected 2)	2,620	19.1	
Protectionist	William Grahame (elected 3)	2,452	17.8	
Free Trade	Henry Brown	2,069	15.1	
Free Trade	James Ellis (defeated)	2,050	14.9	
Free Trade	Charles Stokes	1,903	13.8	
Total formal votes		13,751	99.4	
Informal votes		81	0.6	
Turnout		4,767	75.1	
Protectionist hold 1, win 1 and gain 1 from Free Trade		(1 new seat)		

==== 1887 ====
This section is an excerpt from 1887 New South Wales colonial election § Newcastle

1887 New South Wales colonial election: Newcastle Saturday 5 February
Party	Candidate	Votes	%	±%
Free Trade	James Ellis (elected 1)	2,724	41.2	
Protectionist	James Fletcher (re-elected 2)	2,281	34.5	
Free Trade	George Lloyd (defeated)	1,603	24.3	
Total formal votes		6,608	99.3	
Informal votes		44	0.7	
Turnout		3,890	75.4	

==== 1885 ====
This section is an excerpt from 1885 New South Wales colonial election § Newcastle

1885 New South Wales colonial election: Newcastle Friday 16 October
Candidate	Votes	%
James Fletcher (re-elected 1)	2,483	42.2
George Lloyd (elected 2)	1,839	31.3
Total formal votes	1,557	100.0
Informal votes	5,879	0.0
Turnout	5,934	68.7

==== 1882 ====
This section is an excerpt from 1882 New South Wales colonial election § Newcastle

1882 New South Wales colonial election: Newcastle Thursday 30 November
Candidate	Votes	%
James Fletcher (re-elected 1)	2,121	45.7
James Ellis (elected 2)	1,527	32.9
George Lloyd (defeated)	990	21.4
Total formal votes	4,638	99.4
Informal votes	30	0.6
Turnout	4,668	70.9

==== 1880 ====
This section is an excerpt from 1880 New South Wales colonial election § Newcastle

1880 New South Wales colonial election: Newcastle Monday 22 November
Candidate	Votes	%
James Fletcher (elected 1)	1,876	38.2
George Lloyd (elected 2)	1,195	24.3
James Ellis	1,012	20.6
Richard Bowker (defeated)	830	16.9
Total formal votes	4,913	99.3
Informal votes	34	0.7
Turnout	4,947	73.6
	(1 new seat)	

=== Elections in the 1870s ===
==== 1877 ====
This section is an excerpt from 1877 New South Wales colonial election § Newcastle

1877 New South Wales colonial election: Newcastle Friday 26 October
Candidate	Votes	%
Richard Bowker (elected)	784	54.7
George Lloyd (defeated)	402	28.0
Thomas Hungerford	230	16.0
William Brookes	18	1.3
Total formal votes	1,434	98.4
Informal votes	24	1.7
Turnout	1,458	77.1

==== 1874–75 ====
This section is an excerpt from 1874-75 New South Wales colonial election § Newcastle

1874–75 New South Wales colonial election: Newcastle Tuesday 8 December 1874
Candidate	Votes	%
George Lloyd (re-elected)	641	52.8
Charles Stevens	574	47.2
Total formal votes	1,215	98.5
Informal votes	18	1.5
Turnout	1,233	76.4

==== 1872 by-election ====
1872 Newcastle by-election Wednesday 29 May
Candidate	Votes	%
George Lloyd (re-elected)	692	57.1
Daniel Macquarie	519	42.9
Total formal votes	1,211	98.6
Informal votes	17	1.4
Turnout	1,228	78.8

George Lloyd was appointed Postmaster-General in the first Parkes ministry.

==== 1872 ====
This section is an excerpt from 1872 New South Wales colonial election § Newcastle

1872 New South Wales colonial election: Newcastle Saturday 2 March
Candidate	Votes	%
George Lloyd (elected)	610	51.8
Daniel Macquarie	567	48.2
Total formal votes	1,177	100.0
Informal votes	0	0.0
Turnout	1,177	73.4

=== Elections in the 1860s ===
==== 1869–70 ====
This section is an excerpt from 1869-70 New South Wales colonial election § Newcastle

1869–70 New South Wales colonial election: Newcastle Friday 3 December 1869
Candidate	Votes	%
George Lloyd (elected)	588	53.8
James Martin	505	46.2
Total formal votes	1,093	100.0
Informal votes	0	0.0
Turnout	1,093	76.9

==== 1864–65 ====
This section is an excerpt from 1864–65 New South Wales colonial election § Newcastle

1864–65 New South Wales colonial election: Newcastle Thursday 22 December 1864
Candidate	Votes	%
James Hannell (re-elected)	294	43.6
William Brookes	207	30.7
Charles Bolton	166	24.6
Thomas Adam	7	1.0
Total formal votes	674	96.8
Informal votes	22	3.2
Turnout	696	69.9

==== 1860 ====
This section is an excerpt from 1860 New South Wales colonial election § Newcastle

1860 New South Wales colonial election: Newcastle Thursday 6 December
Candidate	Votes	%
James Hannell (elected)	374	69.3
Arthur Hodgson (defeated)	166	30.7
Total formal votes	540	100.0
Informal votes	0	0.0
Turnout	540	62.1

=== Elections in the 1850s ===
==== 1859 ====
This section is an excerpt from 1859 New South Wales colonial election § Newcastle

1859 New South Wales colonial election: Newcastle Tuesday 14 June
Candidate	Votes	%
Arthur Hodgson (re-elected)	309	51.8
James Hannell	288	48.2
Total formal votes	597	100.0
Informal votes	0	0.0
Turnout	597	68.9
