= Electoral results for the district of Newcastle West =

Election results for Newcastle West, New South Wales, Australia

Newcastle West, an electoral district of the Legislative Assembly in the Australian state of New South Wales was created in 1894 and abolished in 1904.

Election	Member	Party
1894	James Ellis	Free Trade
1895	James Thomson	Labour
1898	James Thomson	Labour
1901	Owen Gilbert	Liberal Reform

== Election results ==
=== Elections in the 1900s ===
==== 1901 ====
1901 New South Wales state election: Newcastle West
Party	Candidate	Votes	%	±%
Liberal Reform	Owen Gilbert	802	57.9	
Progressive	Emmanuel Flynn	316	22.8	−23.6
Labour	Thomas Green	267	19.3	−34.3
Total formal votes		1,385	99.4	−0.5
Informal votes		9	0.7	+0.5
Turnout		1,394	70.8	+7.5
Liberal Reform gain from Labour				

The sitting member was James Thomson (Labour) who did not contest the election.

=== Elections in the 1890s ===
==== 1898 ====
1898 New South Wales colonial election: Newcastle West
Party	Candidate	Votes	%	±%
Labour	James Thomson	580	53.6	
National Federal	James Ellis	502	46.4	
Total formal votes		1,082	99.8	
Informal votes		2	0.2	
Turnout		1,084	63.3	
Labour hold				

==== 1895 ====
1895 New South Wales colonial election: Newcastle West
Party	Candidate	Votes	%	±%
Labour	James Thomson	329	29.6	
Free Trade	James Blanksby	317	28.5	
Ind. Free Trade	James Ellis	249	22.4	
Protectionist	David Scott	193	17.3	
Ind. Protectionist	Alfred Asher	25	2.3	
Total formal votes		1,113	99.4	
Informal votes		7	0.6	
Turnout		1,120	75.2	
Labour gain from Free Trade				

==== 1894 ====
1894 New South Wales colonial election: Newcastle West
Party	Candidate	Votes	%	±%
Free Trade	James Ellis	428	31.5	
Labour	James Thompson	327	24.0	
Ind. Free Trade	James Blanksby	268	19.7	
Protectionist	William Grahame	226	16.6	
Ind. Free Trade	George Webb	112	8.2	
Total formal votes		1,361	99.1	
Informal votes		13	1.0	
Turnout		1,374	89.7	
Free Trade win		(new seat)		
