= Electoral results for the district of Newcastle East =

Election results for Newcastle East, New South Wales, Australia

Newcastle East, an electoral district of the Legislative Assembly in the Australian state of New South Wales was created in 1894 and abolished in 1904.

Election	Member	Party
1894	William Dick	Free Trade
1895	William Dick	Free Trade
1898	William Dick	Free Trade
1901	William Dick	Liberal Reform

== Election results ==
=== Elections in the 1900s ===
==== 1901 ====
1901 New South Wales state election: Newcastle East
Party	Candidate	Votes	%	±%
Liberal Reform	William Dick	1,037	66.9	+6.7
Labour	James Curley	514	33.1	
Total formal votes		1,551	99.6	+1.3
Informal votes		7	0.5	−1.3
Turnout		1,558	69.0	+3.7
Liberal Reform hold				

=== Elections in the 1890s ===
==== 1898 ====
1898 New South Wales colonial election: Newcastle East
Party	Candidate	Votes	%	±%
Free Trade	William Dick	845	60.2	
National Federal	Jefferson Hester	556	39.6	
Independent	Robert Huntly	3	0.2	
Total formal votes		1,404	98.3	
Informal votes		25	1.8	
Turnout		1,429	65.3	
Free Trade hold				

==== 1895 ====
1895 New South Wales colonial election: Newcastle East
Party	Candidate	Votes	%	±%
Free Trade	William Dick	783	60.3	
Protectionist	William Sharpe	516	39.7	
Total formal votes		1,299	99.8	
Informal votes		3	0.2	
Turnout		1,302	72.8	
Free Trade hold				

==== 1894 ====
1894 New South Wales colonial election: Newcastle East
Party	Candidate	Votes	%	±%
Free Trade	William Dick	862	53.8	
Protectionist	David Scott	740	46.2	
Total formal votes		1,602	99.0	
Informal votes		16	1.0	
Turnout		1,618	88.7	
Free Trade win		(new seat)		
