= Electoral results for the district of Wickham (New South Wales) =

Election results for Wickham, New South Wales, Australia

Wickham, an electoral district of the Legislative Assembly in the Australian state of New South Wales was created in 1894 and abolished in 1920.

Election	Member	Party
1894	John Fegan	Free Trade
1895	John Fegan	Protectionist
1898	John Fegan	Protectionist
1901	John Fegan	Progressive
1904	John Fegan	Progressive
1907	William Grahame	Labor
1910	William Grahame	Labor
1913	William Grahame	Labor
1917	William Grahame	Nationalist

== Election results ==
=== Elections in the 1910s ===
==== 1917 ====
1917 New South Wales state election: Wickham
Party	Candidate	Votes	%	±%
Nationalist	William Grahame	4,982	53.9	+22.1
Labor	Christopher Pattinson	4,260	46.1	−22.1
Total formal votes		9,242	99.2	+0.9
Informal votes		77	0.8	−0.9
Turnout		9,319	63.1	−10.0
Member changed to Nationalist from Labor				

The sitting member William Grahame was expelled from Labor in the November 1916 Labor split over conscription.

==== 1913 ====
1913 New South Wales state election: Wickham
Party	Candidate	Votes	%	±%
Labor	William Grahame	5,581	68.2	
Liberal Reform	Magnus Cromarty	2,607	31.8	
Total formal votes		8,188	98.3	
Informal votes		143	1.7	
Turnout		8,331	73.1	
Labor hold				

==== 1910 ====
1910 New South Wales state election: Wickham
Party	Candidate	Votes	%	±%
Labour	William Grahame	5,059	77.5	
Liberal Reform	Thomas Allsopp	1,473	22.6	
Total formal votes		6,532	98.3	
Informal votes		110	1.7	
Turnout		6,642	67.0	
Labour hold				

=== Elections in the 1900s ===
==== 1907 ====
1907 New South Wales state election: Wickham
Party	Candidate	Votes	%	±%
Labour	William Grahame	3,607	55.5	
Former Progressive	John Fegan	2,892	44.5	
Total formal votes		6,499	96.9	
Informal votes		206	3.1	
Turnout		6,705	74.2	
Labour gain from Progressive				

==== 1904 ====
1904 New South Wales state election: Wickham
Party	Candidate	Votes	%	±%
Progressive	John Fegan	2,344	39.8	
Liberal Reform	Owen Gilbert	1,900	32.2	
Labour	Laurence Vial	1,650	28.0	
Total formal votes		5,894	99.6	
Informal votes		22	0.4	
Turnout		5,916	70.2	
Progressive hold				

Wickham was expanded to include part of Waratah and part of the abolished seat of Newcastle West. John Fegan (Progressive) was the member for Wickham while Owen Gilbert (Liberal Reform) was the member for Newcastle West.

==== 1901 ====
1901 New South Wales state election: Wickham
Party	Candidate	Votes	%	±%
Progressive	John Fegan	1,005	53.7	+5.9
Labour	George Errington	677	36.2	+14.5
Liberal Reform	William Sheddon	190	10.2	
Total formal votes		1,872	99.6	+0.1
Informal votes		8	0.4	−0.1
Turnout		1,880	77.4	+4.6
Member changed to Progressive from Liberal Reform				

=== Elections in the 1890s ===
==== 1898 ====
1898 New South Wales colonial election: Wickham
Party	Candidate	Votes	%	±%
Free Trade	John Fegan	747	47.8	
National Federal	Eden George	478	30.6	
Labour	Frank Butler	338	21.6	
Total formal votes		1,563	99.5	
Informal votes		8	0.5	
Turnout		1,571	72.8	
Free Trade hold				

==== 1895 ====
1895 New South Wales colonial election: Wickham
Party	Candidate	Votes	%	±%
Free Trade	John Fegan	803	57.2	
Labour	William Webster	600	42.8	
Total formal votes		1,403	99.8	
Informal votes		3	0.2	
Turnout		1,406	77.4	
Free Trade hold				

==== 1894 ====
1894 New South Wales colonial election: Wickham
Party	Candidate	Votes	%	±%
Free Trade	John Fegan	743	45.4	
Labour	James Dick	338	20.7	
Protectionist	John Gilbert	279	17.0	
Ind. Protectionist	Joseph Barclay	233	14.2	
Ind. Free Trade	Peter Bennett	32	2.0	
Ind. Free Trade	William Hestelow	12	0.7	
Total formal votes		1,637	98.4	
Informal votes		26	1.6	
Turnout		1,663	89.7	
Free Trade win		(new seat)		
