= Georgiana (disambiguation) =

Georgiana is a given name.

Georgiana may also refer to:

== Places ==
- Georgiana, Alabama
- Georgiana, Florida
- Georgiana County, New South Wales
- Electoral district of King and Georgiana

== Plants and animals ==
- Georgiana (beetle), a genus of beetles
- Occirhenea georgiana, a species of snail
- Quercus georgiana, a species of Oak
- Wuestneiopsis georgiana, a plant pathogen

== Schools ==
- Georgiana Molloy Anglican School, a private school located in The Busselton suburb of Yalyalup, Western Australia
- Georgiana Bruce Kirby Preparatory School, a non-profit independent school located in Harvey West, Santa Cruz, California, in the United States

== Ships ==
- Georgiana (ship), several ships
- SS Georgiana, a ship wrecked during the American Civil War
- USS Georgiana III (SP-83), a United States Navy patrol boat in commission from 1917 to 1918
