= 1891 Newcastle colonial by-election =

By-election in New South Wales, Australia

A by-election was held for the New South Wales Legislative Assembly electorate of Newcastle on 14 April 1891 because of the death of James Fletcher (Protectionist).

The East Sydney by-election was held on the same day.

== Dates ==
| Date | Event |
|---|---|
| 19 March 1891 | Death of James Fletcher. |
| 31 March 1891 | Writ of election issued by the Speaker of the Legislative Assembly. |
| 10 April 1891 | Day of nomination |
| 14 April 1891 | Polling day |
| 21 April 1881 | Return of writ |

== Results ==
1891 Newcastle by-election Tuesday 14 April
| Party | Candidate | Votes | % | ±% |
|---|---|---|---|---|
| Protectionist | William Grahame (elected) | 2,081 | 45.6 | |
| Labor | John Fegan | 2,065 | 45.2 | |
| Free Trade | Peter Bennett | 420 | 9.2 | |
| Total formal votes | | 4,566 | 98.5 | |
| Informal votes | | 69 | 1.5 | +0.1 |
| Turnout | | 4,635 | 63.7 | −0.5 |
| Protectionist hold | | | | |

== See also ==
- Electoral results for the district of Newcastle
- List of New South Wales state by-elections
