= Walka Water Works =

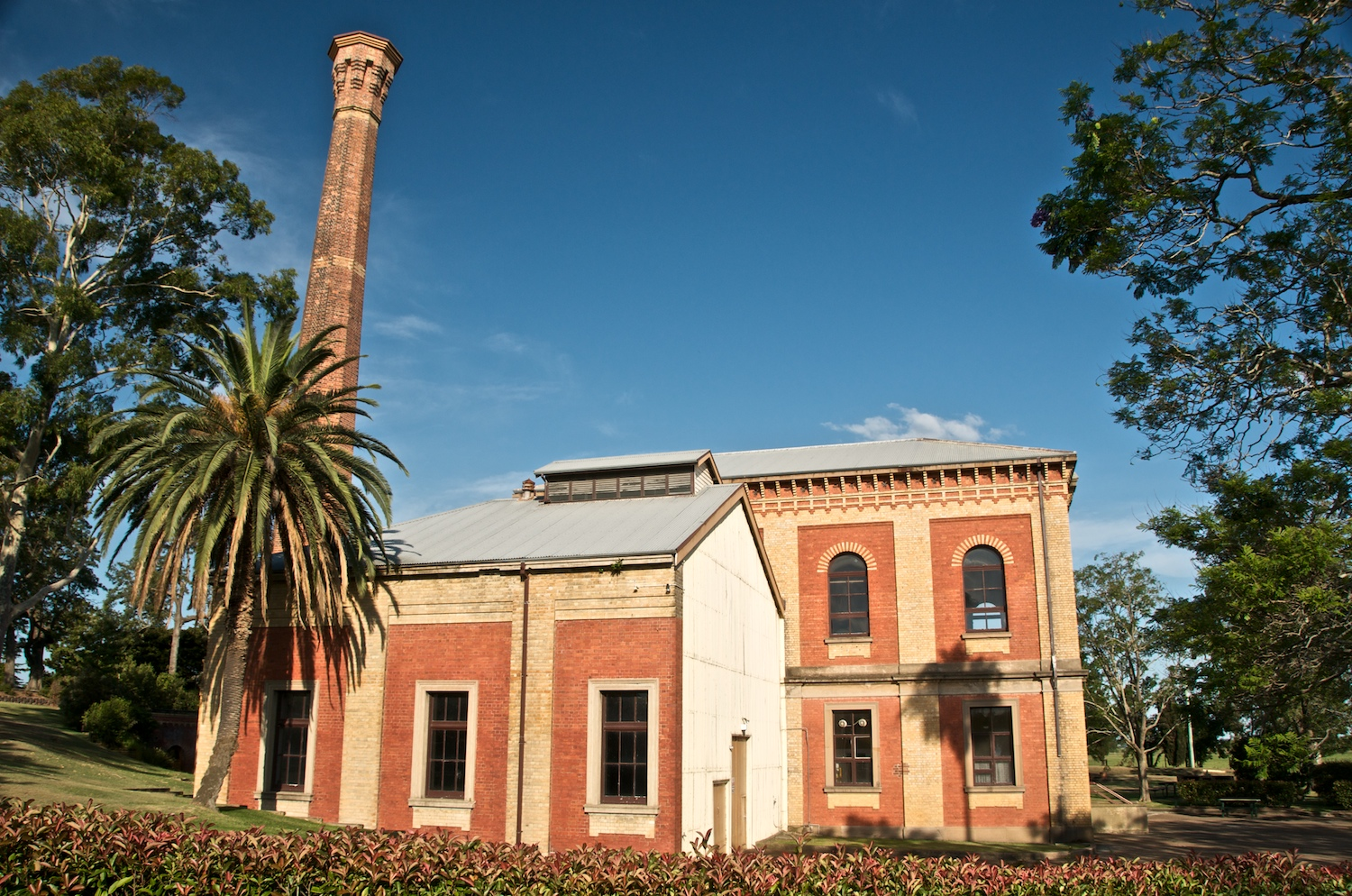
- The pump house and smoke stack
- Interactive map of the Walka Water Works area

General information
- Architectural style: Victorian Italianate
- Location: Oakhampton Heights, 55 Scobies Lane, Oakhampton Heights, City of Maitland, New South Wales, Australia, Maitland, New South Wales, Australia
- Coordinates: 32.71367°S 151.55351°E
- Construction started: 1882
- Completed: 1887
- Cost: £170,000
- Client: Government of New South Wales

Technical details
- Structural system: Brick

Walka Water Works is a heritage-listed 19th-century pumping station at 55 Scobies Lane, Oakhampton Heights, City of Maitland, New South Wales, Australia. Originally built in 1887 to supply water to Newcastle and the lower Hunter Valley, it has since been restored and preserved and is part of Maitland City Council's Walka Recreation and Wildlife Reserve. It was added to the New South Wales State Heritage Register on 2 April 1999.

== History ==
=== Waterworks ===
The Newcastle Borough Council established a Water Committee to try to improve water supply to residents of the inner city area in February 1875 after a very dry period. In 1876, George Lloyd, the local representative in the Parliament of New South Wales raised the matter of government help to finance the construction of a water supply for Newcastle. To the surprise of many, other parliamentarians supported the motion. In 1877 Sir Henry Parkes sent noted British hydraulic engineer William Clark to advise on possible water sources for the Lower Hunter towns. Clark had been brought to NSW to advise on Sydney's water supply and drainage problems. Clark's report recommended Walka as the site for a water works which would supply 37 000 people at the estimated cost of 170 000 pounds.

The citizens of Newcastle were pleased with the scheme and its cost and quickly approved the plan. They sent a deputation to Parliament on 5 December 1877 with strong encouragement from John Robertson, the Colonial Secretary. Construction of a water supply was imminent. However, a new government came to power before the end of the year. Another deputation was sent to Sydney, but James Farnell and his government preferred to give preference to the construction of a second water supply in Sydney

At the end of 1878 a new government took over and a third deputation was sent to Parliament. By May 1879 the necessary surveys and cost estimates had been sufficiently advanced to allow the ordering of machinery and iron pipes but the government refused to bow to pressure from the Hunter region to sanction full expenditure. In 1881 the first steps were taken and the Newcastle and Buttai reservoirs were constructed. Land was resumed for the Walka works in June that year.

The Public Works Department called for tenders to construct the Walka reservoir and associated works in December 1882 and contracts were signed in April 1883. At least four contracting firms were involved, Messrs. T. Smith and M.Burley, George Blunt, James Russell and James Watt and Company. Smith and Burley were responsible for the tunnel which drew water from the river to the pumping station. George Blunt built the reservoir, filter beds and settling and clear water tanks and James Watt and Company of Birmingham supplied and erected the three pumping stations installed at Walka in 1886. James Russell completed the construction of the engine and boiler house although there is dispute as to whether Russell won the contract originally. It is argued that M. Parkhill, a relatively unknown contractor, was given the contract in 1885 but became insolvent, leaving the opportunity for Russell to take over.

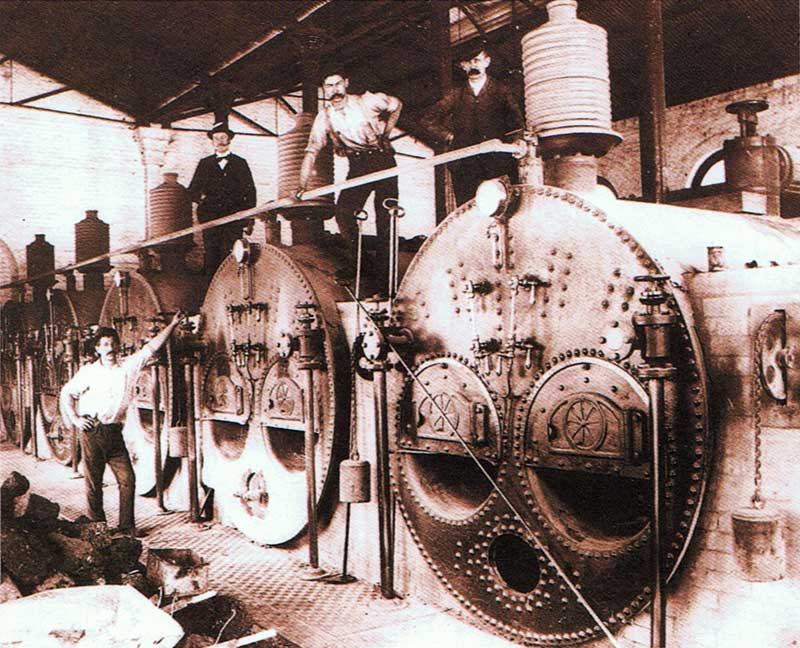
Boilers at the Water Works

The design for the complex was undertaken by notable English engineer Sir William Clark and was a major engineering project for the area at the time. Water was pumped from the Hunter River to a reservoir along a brick tunnel approximately 6 feet (1.8 m) in diameter and 9 metres (30 ft) below ground. At full operation, it had three pumping engines (150 hp each and with a flywheel weighing 36 tonnes), two horizontal compound pumps and a triple expansion surface condensing pump engine. Water would be pumped from the river at Oakhampton up to the Walka reservoir (still visible as the Walka lake today), then pumped onwards to another reservoir 6 miles (9.7 km) away at Buttai; where it was "gravitationally distributed".

The waterworks served as the sole water supply of the Lower Hunter towns from 1887 until 1929 when it was superseded by the Tarro Pumping Station. Industrial development and an increasing population in the period resulted in a growth in demand for water and the need for considerable development and modification at the site. In 1892 the pumps were improved and a third pump was attached to the No.3 beam engine. This was also the year that the Hunter District Water Supply and Sewerage Board took over the works. In 1896-7 a second pipe was constructed between the Hunter River and the waterworks. In 1900 Newcastle was consuming double the water it had consumed in 1892.

The implementation of the waterworks scheme for drinking and washing made possible the provision of sewerage systems to the towns. This improved the health of the community by reducing the likelihood of disease and improving the cleanliness of the population and their urban environment.

Severe droughts in 1902 and 1905-6 produced supply problems and demonstrated that the Hunter River was no longer an adequate water source for the region. In 1908 the number of filter beds was increased from four to six and by 1910 it had become necessary at times to operate three beam pumping engines simultaneously. In 1913 more equipment was installed and a further four rapid water filters were installed in 1916. At peak operation the waterworks produced 3843 megalitres (in 1915).

As the population of the area continued to increase, other sources of supply were developed – namely Chichester Dam near Dungog. From 1923 to 1940 the waterworks were used as a backup water supply only.

In 1925 the complex was put on standby and with the onset of the Great Depression and the completion of Tarro pumping station at Tarro, the plant was shut down as an economy measure in 1931. After the Second World War in 1949 all the plant and machinery was sold for scrap, fetching £2,500.

=== Power Station ===
Two years later, in 1951, the site was reopened as a temporary coal power station by the Electricity Commission to overcome post-war electricity shortages. What was described as a "package power plant" was bought from General Electric and imported from America. The plant was shipped out in pieces, then taken to the site by rail (to Maitland station) and a specially made truck. GE engineers also came out to assemble the plant.

It began producing electricity in 1953. Three boilers ran on coal, and another ran on oil, though later this became a coal/oil combination. Two rail lines were built to the power station from the North Coast railway line.

Using Walka as a power station was controversial. Initially the power station suffered from sinking foundations – leading to the temporary sacking of 120 workers, until it was agreed that the sinking was a result of recent rain. During construction, the workforce went on strike after a boilermaker union member was sacked for "misconduct" towards his foreman. This was eventually resolved, but in December 1953 the power station suffered another setback when one of its oil storage tanks collapsed in gale-force winds. The station was also unpopular with local vegetable growers, who complained about the amount of soot the station was producing.

The powerplant was decommissioned in 1976 and dismantled in 1978.

=== Recreation and Wildlife Reserve ===
Not until 1984 were there definite attempts to reopen the site. At this time a Trust was formed, aiming to open the site and restore the Waterworks complex. The complex had been classified by the National Trust in 1976. Today the area is open as a free public reserve, with barbecues, picnics areas, a playground, walking trails and a 7 1/4 inch gauge miniature railway that operates passenger rides each Sunday. The reservoir and surrounding plant life make it a unique environment for birds and animals in the area.

=== Proposed Transformation into a Holiday Park ===
In 2022, Maitland City Council partnered with Reflections Holiday Parks and Crown Lands on a plan to transform part of the heritage‑listed Walka Water Works site, into a holiday park and tourism destination, including caravan sites, eco‑cabins and glamping. This plan was deeply controversial, with many residents against the planned development. However, detailed studies of the site revealed asbestos contamination across the site. Maitland City Council chose in early 2024 to reprioritise the funding toward safety and remediation work rather than immediate development. This led Reflections Holidays Parks to withdraw from the project.

== Key characteristics ==
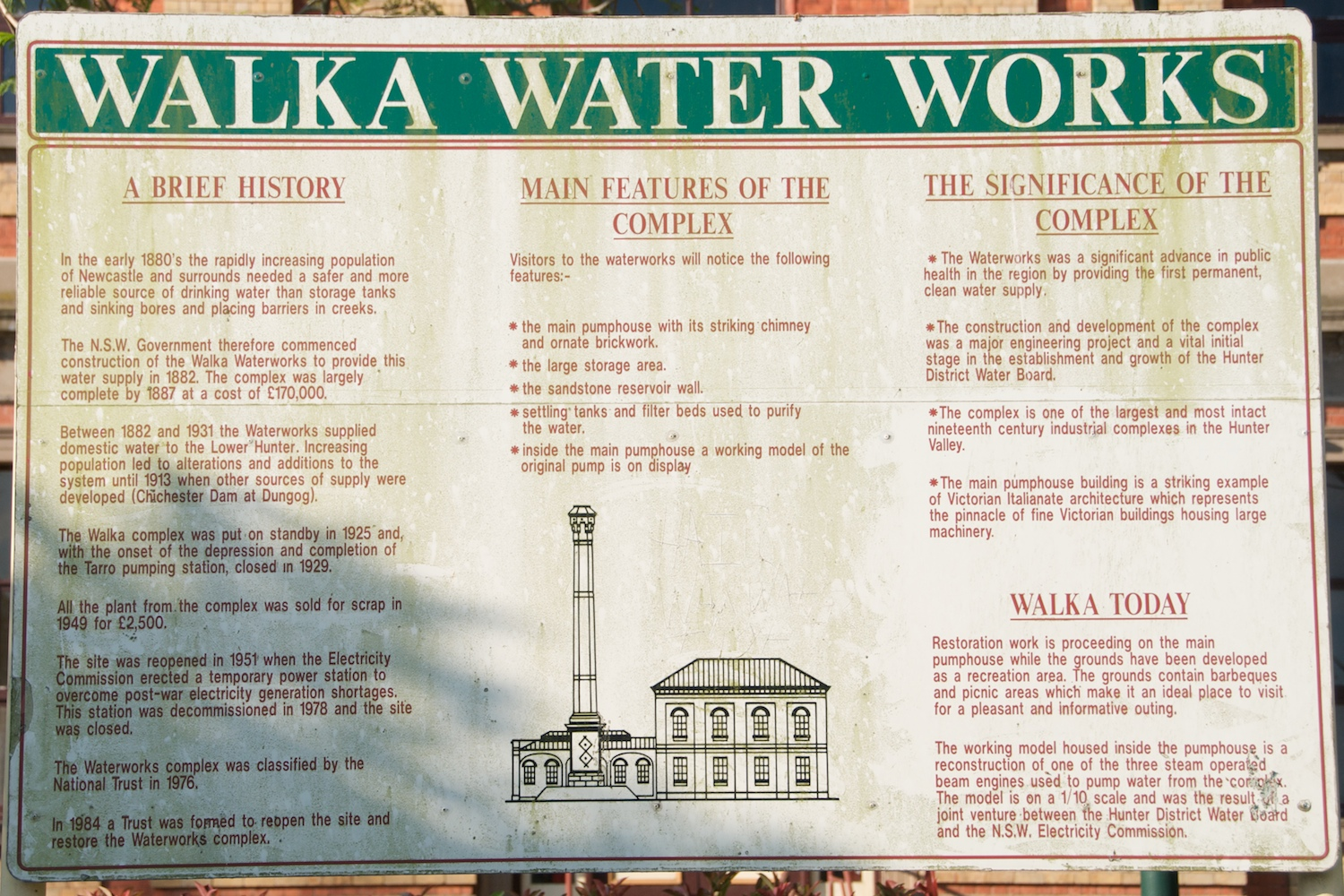
Information board at Walka Water Works

- Main pump house with distinctive chimney, ornate brickwork and Victorian Italianate architecture
- Large sandstone water reservoir
- Settling tanks and filter beds to purify water
- Miniature Railway

== Description ==
The Walka Water Works site's curtilage is roughly diamond-shaped, including a hillside zone, footslopes to a U-shaped reservoir or dam, with the industrial complex of the water treatment works to the reservoir's north-west.

The group of buildings known as the Walka Waterworks are located within site boundaries north west of the dam.

The buildings and structures of the complex are generally constructed of load bearing brickwork, with trussed roof structures to the main engine houses, and roofed with corrugated iron.

=== Main Pump House ===
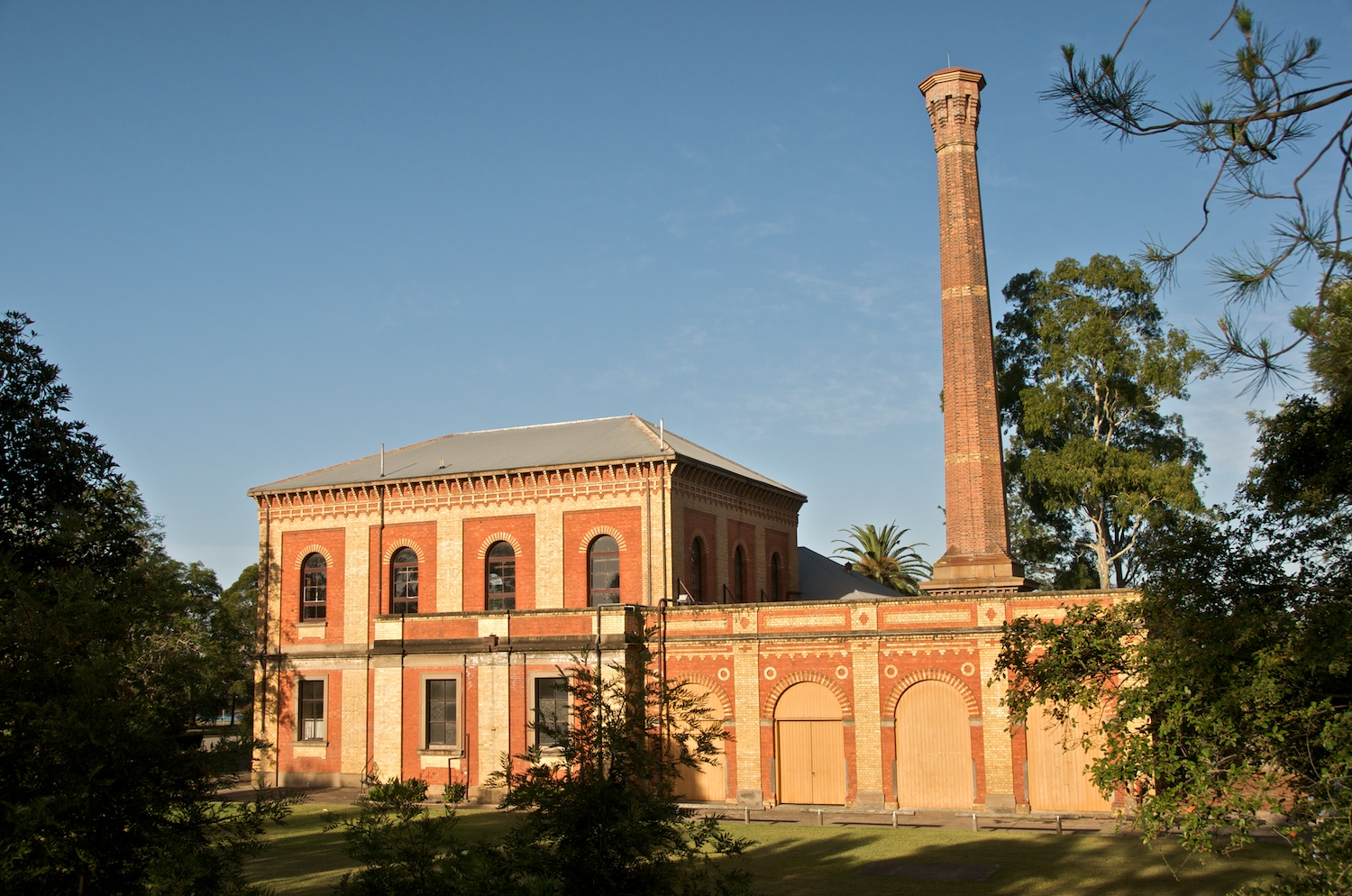
Pump house and smoke stack, 2008

2 storey polychrome brick structure with walls up to 1 metre thick. It contains a basement approximately 10 metres deep. Six cast iron columns built to support the first floor remain but all other original features have been replaced or obscured by a raised floor, office partitions and a stairway constructed in the 1950s. The first floor retains sufficient fixtures to demonstrate its previous operations. Original sections of flooring remain as do cast iron cross beams, shoes, joists, decorative grills, timber floor joists and the pilaster which carried the overhaul beam crane. A large sandstone block is located within the wall above and below each pair of joists. The original colour scheme is still visible.

=== Boiler Room ===
Attached to the northern end of the main pump house. The roof is double hipped and clad in corrugated iron and has been subject to modifications. Surviving features include the steam header access hole in the southern wall, column capitals, the flue, the access door to the engine room and an unusual configuration of windows beneath relieving arches in the brickwork.

=== Chimney ===
Polychrome brick standing 36 metres tall. Square base translating through an octagonal section to become a tapering cylinder, terminating in finely corbelled brickwork. A flue leads to the chimney from the centre of the western wall of the boiler room.

=== Eastern Extension to Pumphouse ===
Built in 1893 as an office. The original 9 pane windows have been replaced by 6 pane windows. An extremely unsympathetic entrance and set of stairs have been inserted in the southern wall. Internal amenities installed during the 1950s by the Electricity Commission and plumbing fittings remain.

=== Western Pumphouse ===
Built in 1913, the building abuts the main pumphouse, its form and detail successfully reflecting the original building. The pump house required the bricking in of openings to the main pump house and removal or relocation of the original window joinery. The existing 9 pane windows on the western side of the building are probably the only remaining original windows of the complex. The internal brickwork is rendered and painted but along its eastern side it retains the profile of the exterior of the main pump house. The roof trusses of riveted steel are exposed. The southern wall is constructed of timber and corrugated iron to enable further expansion.

=== Workshop ===
A small single storey building north of, and separate from, the original boiler room. Four cast iron chutes penetrate the northern wall. This wall is a retaining wall built against an embankment which defines the northern boundary of the pumping station complex. This wall is angled with a buttressed base and weepholes. Concrete steps adjacent to the east lead to the road above. The building contains fire bricks for use in the Electricity Commission boilers.

=== Boiler Room Addition ===
A lean to roof and western wall of corrugated iron over a timber frame erected between the workshop and boiler room in 1913.

=== Settling Tank ===
large rectangular tank (220' x 115' x 10') located north west of the pump house complex. The walls are sandstock brick covered with cement render. The floor is concrete. The tank has not been filled and remains largely intact. Several of its associated artefacts and components, including a vertical iron inlet pipe on the eastern side, an outlet and overflow pipes on the southern side and height gauge and ladder remain. A steep, centrally located set of concrete steps lead south down an embankment to the filter beds.

=== Filter Beds ===
Seven beds were constructed in 3 stages. Beds 1-4 were laid out in a grid fashion around a north–south pipe. All were built of sandstone blocks. Beds 2 and 4 have been damaged by the erection of concrete bases for cooling towers associated with the c. 1950s power station. Beds 1 and 3 have been uncovered and probably remain substantially intact.

Beds 5 and 6 are of different construction, having been added in 1908. They feature off-form concrete walls with pre-cast concrete cappings. Bed 7 was built in 1913 in a similar design to the 1908 beds and is in reasonable condition. The filtration layers of sand, gravel and brick may remain in silt within beds 1,3,5,6 & 7.

Clearwater tank

Of brick construction and located below the filter beds. The brick piers of the rim show evidence of the roof line but iron supports for the roof have been removed. The western side features gate piers with brick caps. The intake, outlet and overflow pipes associated with this tank remain in situ.

=== Reservoir ===
The reservoir edges follow the natural land contours on the northern and western sides and are bounded by an earthen embankment made from material excavated during the construction of the tanks, filter beds and pumping station on the southern and eastern ends. Its internal face is lined with Ravensfield sandstone blocks. A brick byewash (4m x 2m) is located at the southern west extremity of the reservoir. It has an arched, buttressed brick face covered with concrete render. The byewash contains a large valve which could be opened to lower or drain the water in the reservoir.

A circular brick structure with an iron trap door is centrally located on the reservoir's north bank and a small valve house is present about 30m from the eastern wall. A discharge cooling tunnel runs parallel with the northern bank.

=== Chief Engineer's Residence ===
9 room brick cottage. Substantial footings and rubble, a tennis court and an approach road flanked by introduced trees remain.

=== Second Engineer's Cottage ===
Footings of the second engineer's 6 room brick cottage remain.

=== Natural features ===
An isolated stand of an endangered ecological community, Lower Hunter Spotted Gum-Ironbark Forest, has survived in the area because the small catchment around the constructed reservoir lake was bordered for historical civic purposes some 150 years ago and has remained relatively secure in tenure and management since. (spotted gum is Corymbia maculata: ironbark is one of several species of Eucalyptus). The bush component acts as an island and a stepping stone for fauna within the (largely cleared) Hunter Valley. It has some 300 species of bird recorded on this site alone. Four threatened bird species have been recorded here: Australasian bittern (Botaurus poiciloptilus) (endangered); black bittern (Ixobrychus flavicollis) (vulnerable); blue-billed duck (Oxyura australis) (vulnerable) and freckled duck (Stictonetta naevosa) (vulnerable). 18 other threatened fauna species including three more bird species, have been recorded within a 10 km radius of Walka Water Works since January 2000, although their specific presence at Walka has not been determined.

=== Miscellaneous features ===
An extensive system of concrete paved roads, paths and kerbing installed by the Electricity Commission in the 1950s. Remnants of the planting scheme installed at the site by the Electricity Commission.

A sparse scatter of plantings from the original period of operation, including an avenue of trees near the Chief Engineer's residence.

A substantial railway formation, including cuttings and embankments, runs from the site of the power station along the northern edge of the reservoir and connects to the North Coast railway main line at the western end of the site. Some sections of the railway track remain in situ. A vehicle track follows the railway line.

A cast iron pipe network and a steel pipe network remain.

The steel steps and concrete footings for the fuel air pump house can be seen at the edge of the rail track below filter bed 7.

=== Modifications and dates ===
- 1892 - a 3rd pump attached to No.3 beam engine
- 1893 - eastern extension to main pump house
- 1908 - filter beds 5 & 6 built
- 1913 -
  - western pumphouse built
  - boiler room addition between workshop and boiler room
  - pump shed built (now gone - n.d)
  - filter bed 7 built
  - Babcock and Wilcox boilers, steam economiser, feed pumps and accessories and a vertical triple expansion 3 plunger pump engine added
- 1949 - concrete floor installed in western pumphouse after water pumping machinery removed.
- 1950s - Electricity Commission installs amenities in eastern pump house extension and makes alterations to pump house
- 1975 - Second Engineer's cottage demolished

== Heritage listing ==
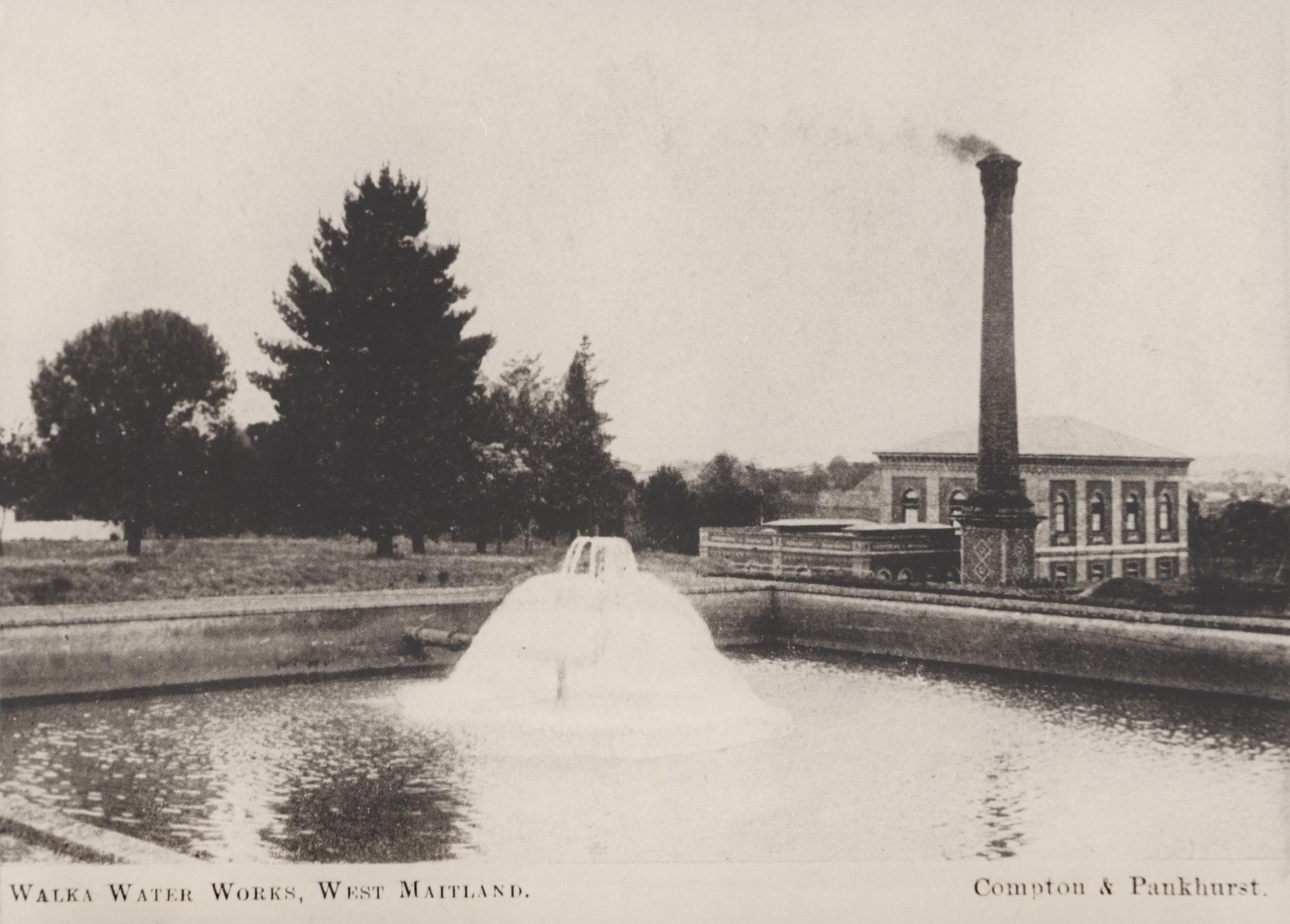
Walka Water Works, West Maitland NSW

Walka Water Works is one of the largest and most intact 19th century industrial complexes in the Hunter Valley. The surviving water treatment features at the site constitute the most comprehensive set in NSW and clearly illustrate water filtration and reticulation processes and the major developments which occurred during the late 19th and early 20th century. The pump house, chimney and boiler house are elegant finely executed polychrome brick structures in a traditional configuration which are located within an attractive landscape. The entire complex, including reservoir and tanks, is an important cultural landmark.

Walka Water Works was listed on the New South Wales State Heritage Register on 2 April 1999 having satisfied the following criteria.

The place is important in demonstrating the course, or pattern, of cultural or natural history in New South Wales.

Establishment of the complex was a major political and engineering achievement, finally providing a permanent supply of clean water to Newcastle residents. Changes and developments at the complex document the growth of the demand for water. An expectation of further expansion is evidenced in the temporary nature of the southern wall of the pump house west annex. The construction, expansion and demise of the waterworks were vital stages in the establishment and growth of the Hunter Valley Waterboard. The ultimate demise of the site as a water treatment plant and its subsequent development (and demise) as a power station documents significant periods of growth and change in the community. William Clark, a prominent hydraulics engineer and a number of other noteworthy individuals were closely associated with the complexes design, construction and expansion.

The place is important in demonstrating aesthetic characteristics and/or a high degree of creative or technical achievement in New South Wales.

The entire site has been largely unmarred by the construction of any other unsympathetic developments. The reservoir catchment continues to provide a pleasant rural curtilage to the complex. The pumphouse, chimney and boiler house are finely executed polychrome brick structures which feature a degree of uniformity in materials, form and scale that is typical of many 19th century public buildings. The combination of elegant polychrome brick buildings, filter beds, tanks and reservoir with the nearby topography creates an element of considerable cultural interest and beauty within an already attractive landscape.

The place has strong or special association with a particular community or cultural group in New South Wales for social, cultural or spiritual reasons.

The complex is an outstanding resource for the interpretation of the importance of 19th century industrial processes. For many years it has been a cultural landmark to the people of Maitland and the Hunter Valley. The site is the centrepiece of the most important advance in public health in the history of the Hunter Valley, improving health and cleanliness of the population and their urban environment. Furthermore, without a water supply many secondary industries which provided employment in the Newcastle area could not have been established.

The place has potential to yield information that will contribute to an understanding of the cultural or natural history of New South Wales.

The complex is the only complete set of 19th century water filtration equipment extant in NSW and illustrates water treatment filtration processes. The configuration and substantial remains of all major components of the complex, including evident remains of machinery locations and ancillary structures, such as pipes, enable the processes carried out to be clearly understood. The largely intact set of Victorian structures typify the building associations of a 19th-century technology. The evolution of the complex over time provides evidence of the development of steam technology from beam engines to reciprocating engines.

The place is important in demonstrating the principal characteristics of a class of cultural or natural places/environments in New South Wales.

The intact nature of the site makes it an excellent representation of water filtering and reticulation processes of the period.

== Engineering heritage award ==
The Walka water supply scheme received an Engineering Heritage National Marker from Engineers Australia as part of its Engineering Heritage Recognition Program.
