= 1889 Newcastle colonial by-election =

By-election in New South Wales, Australia

A by-election was held for the New South Wales Legislative Assembly electorate of Newcastle on 12 October 1889 because of the resignation of William Grahame who had financial difficulties.

== Dates ==
Date	Event
3 October 1889	William Grahame made bankrupt, and resigned.
4 October 1889	Writ of election issued by the Speaker of the Legislative Assembly.
10 October 1889	Day of nomination
12 October 1889	Polling day
24 October 1889	Return of writ

== Results ==
1889 Newcastle by-election Saturday 12 October
Party	Candidate	Votes	%	±%
Free Trade	James Curley (elected)	2,173	51.8	
Protectionist	William Grahame (defeated)	2,022	48.2	
Total formal votes		4,195	98.6	−0.8
Informal votes		61	1.4	+0.8
Turnout		4,256	64.2	−10.9
Free Trade gain from Protectionist				

== See also ==
- Electoral results for the district of Newcastle
- List of New South Wales state by-elections
