= William Clark (inventor) =

English civil engineer and inventor

William Clark (17 March 1821 – 22 January 1880) was an English civil engineer and inventor.

== Life ==
Born at Colchester, Clark attended King's College London in 1842, and was made an Associate of King's College in 1845. Soon afterwards he became a pupil of, and subsequently an assistant to, J. Birkinshaw, M. Inst. C.E., under whom he was employed for three years on the works of the York and North Midland railway system. In 1850 he was connected with Sir Goldsworthy Gurney in the warming and ventilation of the houses of parliament. In 1851 he entered into partnership with A. W. Makinson, M. Inst. C.E., the firm devoting special attention to the warming and ventilating of public buildings. He shortly afterwards obtained the appointment of surveyor to the local board of health of Kingston-upon-Hull, and devised a complete system of drainage for that town.

In 1854 he entered the service of the East Indian Railway Company, and, after acting for a year as resident engineer on a portion of the East India railway, became the secretary and subsequently the engineer to the municipality of Calcutta. Clark devoted himself with zeal to his work, and very soon proposed a complete scheme for the drainage of the city, only imperfectly carried out owing to the expense. He also devised a system of waterworks, comprising three large pumping stations, with their filter beds and settling tanks.

He returned to England in 1874, when he entered into partnership with W. F. Batho, M. Inst. C.E., and in the same year received the appointment of consulting engineer to the Oudh and Rohilkund Railway Company. In December 1874 he visited Madras, where he remained four months planning a system of drainage for that city. He was selected by the colonial office in 1876, in concert with the government of New South Wales, to advise and report upon the water supply and drainage of Sydney. During a residence of two years in the Australian colonies he prepared schemes of a like description for Port Adelaide, Newcastle, Bathurst, Goulburn, Orange, Maitland (the Walka Water Works), and Brisbane, and afterwards for Wellington and Christchurch in New Zealand.

Among Clark's inventions was his tied brick arch, of which examples exist in Calcutta and in other places in India; and he was joint patentee with William F. Batho of the well-known steam road roller. Among his schemes was a proposal for reclaiming the salt-water lakes in the neighbourhood of Calcutta. He was elected a member of the Institution of Civil Engineers on 2 February 1864, and a member of the Institution of Mechanical Engineers in 1867.

He died from liver disease, at Surbiton, on 22 January 1880. He was the writer of The Drainage of Calcutta, 1871.
