= Georgiana (ship) =

Numerous vessels have borne the name Georgiana:

- Georgiana (1791 ship) served as a merchantman, packet ship for the British East India Company (EIC), whaler, sloop of the navy of the United States of America, and merchant vessel again. She was condemned as leaky and sold in 1818.
- Georgiana (1802 ship) was a Mexican vessel that the British captured and that between 1802 and 1808 made three voyages as a whaler for Samuel Enderby & Sons.
- Georgiana was the cutter King George that was renamed Georgiana in 1804 and that served the British Royal Navy as a hired armed vessel between August 1803 and August 1804 when she was wrecked.
- Georgiana (1818 ship) was launched in British India, probably in 1818, and made one voyage for the British EIC, and at least one voyage carrying immigrants to Australia.
- Georgiana (1826 ship) was launched at Quebec in 1826 and made three voyages transporting convicts to Australia
- SS Georgiana, a Confederate cruiser launched in 1863 that her captain scuttled on her maiden voyage
- Georgiana (steamboat), a steamboat that operated on the Columbia River from 1914 to 1940
