= Edward Flood =

Australian politician (1805–1888)

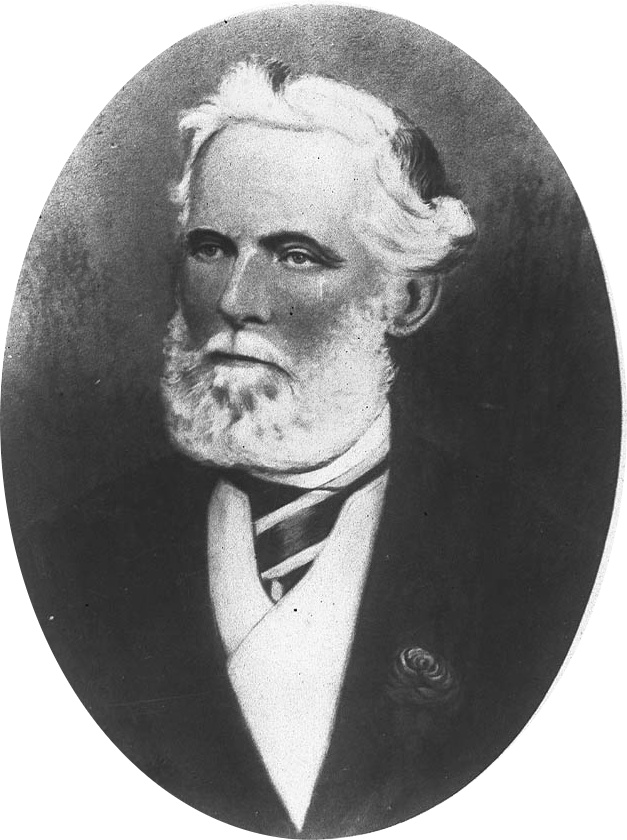

Secretary for Public Works
- In office 1 October 1859 – 26 October 1859
- Preceded by: New Position
- Succeeded by: Geoffrey Eagar

Personal details
- Born: 24 June 1805 Sydney
- Died: 9 September 1888 (aged 83) Sydney

Edward Flood (24 June 1805 – 9 September 1888) was an Australian politician. He was a member of the New South Wales Legislative Council between 1851 and 1856 and again from 1879 until his death. He was also a member of the New South Wales Legislative Assembly between 1856 and 1872. He was the first Secretary for Public Works in New South Wales.

== Early life ==
Flood was the illegitimate son of an Irish convict. He had minimal formal education but became an apprentice carpenter and builder. By 1840 he had become extremely wealthy and had acquired a large amount of city property and pastoral interests including Narrandera Station and property on the Darling River. He also owned wool stores at Circular Quay, a wool pressing company and flour mills. He was a foundation alderman of Sydney City Council and was a supporter of the Benevolent Society.

== State Parliament ==
In 1851, prior to the establishment of responsible self-government, Flood was elected to the semi-elected Legislative Council. He represented the electorate of North-Eastern Boroughs until the granting of responsible self-government in 1856. At the first election under the new constitution he was elected to the Legislative Assembly as the member for the same seat. At the next election in 1858 he transferred to the two-member Sydney seat of Cumberland (South Riding). This seat was subsequently renamed Canterbury at the 1859 election and Flood retained it until he resigned in January 1860 apparently after a heated dispute with the Premier, William Forster. He subsequently re-entered the Assembly after winning the seat of Central Cumberland at the 1869–70 election. He did not willingly contest the 1872 election although he was nominated for the electorate of Newtown. In 1879 he accepted a life appointment to the Legislative Council, which he retained until his death.

Flood was politically radical and opposed the re-introduction of transportation and the autocratic powers of the Governors prior to the granting of responsible government. He was socially conservative and had a reputation of being a tough businessman who objected to the level of wages demanded by labourers in the colony. His support of Protestantism alienated many in the colony's large Irish community.

== Government ==
Flood's only ministerial appointment was as Secretary for Public Works in the second government of Charles Cowper. He was appointed on 1 October 1859 but his appointment was curtailed by the fall of Cowper's government 26 days later. William Forster believed that Cowper had created the position and appointed Flood in an unsuccessful attempt to strengthen his parliamentary position.

Political offices
| New office | Secretary for Public Works; 1 – 26 Oct 1859 | Succeeded by Geoffrey Eagar |
New South Wales Legislative Council
| New district | Member for North Eastern Boroughs; 1851 – 1856 | Parliament re-constituted |
New South Wales Legislative Assembly
| New assembly | Member for North Eastern Boroughs; 1856 – 1858 | Succeeded by Richard Bowker |
| Preceded by James Byrnes | Member for Cumberland (South Riding); 1858 – 1859; Served alongside: Donaldson | Succeeded by Seat abolished |
| Preceded by New seat | Member for Canterbury; 1859 – 1860; Served alongside: Lyons | Succeeded by John Lucas |
| Preceded by Samuel Lyons | Member for Central Cumberland; 1870 – 1872; Served alongside: Lackey | Succeeded by John Hurley |
