= Electoral district of North Eastern Boroughs (NSW Legislative Council) =

Former legislative council electoral district of New South Wales, Australia

North Eastern Boroughs New South Wales—Legislative Council
- State: New South Wales
- Created: 1851
- Abolished: 1856
- Coordinates: 32°55′S 151°45′E

The Electoral district of North Eastern Boroughs was an electorate of the New South Wales Legislative Council at a time when some of its members were elected and the balance were appointed by the Governor. It was a new electorate created in 1851 by the expansion of the Legislative Council to 54, 18 to be appointed and 36 elected. The district consisted of the towns of Newcastle, Stockton and Raymond Terrace that had previously been part of Northumberland Boroughs.

In 1856 the unicameral Legislative Council was abolished and replaced with an elected Legislative Assembly and an appointed Legislative Council. The district was represented by the Legislative Assembly electorate of North Eastern Boroughs.

== Members ==
Member	Term
Edward Flood	Sep 1851 – Feb 1856

Edward Flood went on to represent North Eastern Boroughs in the Legislative Assembly from 1856.

== Election results ==
=== 1851 ===
1851 New South Wales colonial election, 20 September: North Eastern Boroughs
Candidate	Votes	%
Edward Flood	47	55.95
Charles Kemp	37	44.05
Total votes	84	100.00
