= Electoral district of North Eastern Boroughs =

Former state electoral district of New South Wales, Australia

North Eastern Boroughs was an electoral district of the Legislative Assembly in the Australian state of New South Wales from 1856 to 1859, that included the towns of Newcastle, Stockton and Raymond Terrace. It was partly replaced by the electoral district of Newcastle and the electoral district of Hunter.

== Members for North Eastern Boroughs ==
| Member | Party | Period |
|---|---|---|
| Edward Flood | None | 1856–1857 |
| Richard Bowker | None | 1858–1859 |

== Election results ==
=== 1856 ===
1856 New South Wales colonial election: North Eastern Boroughs
| Candidate | Votes | % |
|---|---|---|
| Edward Flood (elected) | 138 | 66.0 |
| John Plunkett | 71 | 34.0 |
| Total formal votes | 209 | 100.0 |
| Informal votes | 0 | 0.0 |
| Turnout | 209 | 58.7 |

Polling was conducted on 29 March 1856. Both Flood and Plunkett had served in the old Legislative Council, Flood representing this district and Plunkett as an appointed member. Plunkett had earlier contested Sydney City and was unsuccessful. After his defeat in this seat, Plunkett contested both Argyle and Bathurst (County).

=== 1858 ===
Flood did not contest the seat at the 1858 election, successfully standing for Cumberland (South Riding) instead.

1858 New South Wales colonial election: North Eastern Boroughs 26 January 1858
| Candidate | Votes | % |
|---|---|---|
| Richard Bowker | unopposed | |

The sitting member Edward Flood successfully contested Cumberland (South Riding).
