= Arthur Wade =

Australian politician

Arthur Wade OAM

Member of the New South Wales Parliament for Newcastle
- In office 1968–1988
- Preceded by: Frank Hawkins
- Succeeded by: George Keegan

Personal details
- Born: William Arthur Wade; 25 March 1919 Carrington, New South Wales, Australia
- Died: 24 August 2014 (aged 95) Newcastle, New South Wales, Australia
- Party: Labor
- Spouse: Heather Muncaster
- Children: 3
- Occupation: Shopkeeper

William Arthur Wade OAM (25 March 1919 – 24 August 2014) was an Australian soldier and politician representing Newcastle in the New South Wales Legislative Assembly from 1968 to 1988.

Wade was born in the Newcastle suburb of Carrington and educated at Carrington Public School and Broadmeadow High School. At age 20, he enlisted at Hamilton during WWII and he served in the Second Australian Imperial Force from 1939 in the 2/3 Field Regiment. He was captured during the Battle of Crete in 1941 and was a prisoner of war interred at the Stalag VII-A camp in Germany and Poland until the end of the war in 1945. After the war he was a shopkeeper and married Heather Muncaster in August 1949 and they had two sons and one daughter.

Wade was an alderman on Newcastle City Council from 1947 to 1968, including a year as Deputy Lord Mayor in 1958. He was a member of Shortland County Council (the local electricity retailer) from 1958 to 1968. He was the Labor Party member for Newcastle from 1968 to 1988. During his parliamentary service, he served as chairman of the Labor Party caucus as well as party whip under Neville Wran, who he was considered close to.

He was awarded an Order of Australia (OAM) on Australia Day in 1996 "for service to the community, the NSW Parliament and local government" as well as the Centenary Medal in 2001 "for service to the community". He was made the fourth freeman of the Newcastle City Council in 1989.

New South Wales Legislative Assembly
| Preceded by Frank Hawkins | Member for Newcastle; 1968 – 1988 | Succeeded by George Keegan |
