= James Thomson (Australian politician) =

Australian politician

James Thomson (born 1856, date of death unknown) was a Scottish-born Australian politician.

He worked as a miner in Fifeshire from the age of twelve, later moving to Lanarkshire. He migrated to New South Wales in 1874 and worked at the a number of mines, serving as President of the Miners' Association. From 1895 to 1901 he was the Labor member for Newcastle West in the New South Wales Legislative Assembly.

New South Wales Legislative Assembly
Preceded by James Ellis	Member for Newcastle West; 1895–1901	Succeeded by Owen Gilbert
