= Richard Bowker (Australian businessman) =

Australian mariner, physician, surgeon and politician

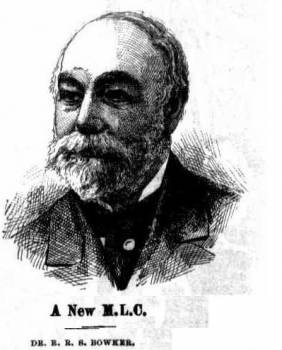
- Born: August 30, 1815. Campsall, Yorkshire
- Died: April 3, 1903 (aged 87)
- Occupation: surgeon
- Known for: Member of Parliament

Richard Ryther Steer Bowker (30 August 1815 – 3 April 1903) was an Australian mariner, physician, surgeon and politician.

== Early life and education ==
Bowker was the son of Thomas Dawson and Elizabeth Steer and born at Campsall, Yorkshire, England. He was awarded diplomas in botany and materia medica in Paris in 1836 and an MD from the University of St Andrews in 1839. He visited Australia in the emigrant ship the Shepherd and then migrated to Melbourne, Colony of New South Wales, in the Georgiana in February 1841. He kept a diary on the voyage which was edited and published by one of his descendants in 2016. The volume also records his service aboard the Sydney whaler Caroline (1841–42) as an ordinary seaman. He was a passenger on the Susannah from London to the Cape in 1845. From there he left to India where, in 1846, Indian contract labourers went aboard as passengers to Mauritius, with Bowker aboard as the ship's doctor. He sailed from Mauritius back to India, arriving at Madras in September 1846.

== Career ==
In New South Wales, Bowker was appointed as a medical practitioner to the Loyal Union Lodge in Newcastle in 1842, resigning in 1844. He was a surgeon on ships transporting coolies from India to Mauritius and Durban in 1846–1847. He was reappointed to the Loyal Union Lodge in 1847. From 1851 to 1853, he researched tropical diseases in the East Indies. He briefly returned to Newcastle and then went to England gaining a Licentiate of the Royal College of Physicians and a Fellowship of the Royal College of Surgeons in 1854. Bowker returned to Newcastle and was elected to the Legislative Assembly as member for North-Eastern Boroughs from January 1858 to 1859. He married Lydia Frances Phillips in November 1858 and they eventually had issue three daughters and six sons.

From 1862 or 1863 until 1874, Bowker was simultaneously assistant surgeon for the Volunteer Artillery, health officer for Newcastle and government medical officer. He was particularly concerned to prevent the practice of placing cemeteries, such as the existing cemetery at Christ Church, in the urban area, where they could pollute wells and swamps, which were still used for collecting water for household use. Eventually, he persuaded the Council to build its new cemetery at Sandgate, well away from the urban area. Apart from his public health interests, he also gained a reputation as an eye surgeon.

Bowker also owned ships, and valuable city properties and owned 22 acres (89,000 m^{2}) of land at Waratah. He bred race horses at his estate, Bona Vista near Paterson. He was the member for Newcastle from 1877 to 1888. In 1888, he was appointed for life to the Legislative Council. In 1873, he moved to Avoca House at Darling Point in Sydney, where he died.

New South Wales Legislative Assembly
Preceded by Edward Flood	Member for North Eastern Boroughs; 1858 – 1859	Succeeded by Abolished
Preceded by George Lloyd	Member for Newcastle; 1877 – 1880	Succeeded by James Fletcher; George Lloyd
