= William Grahame (1841–1906) =

Australian politician (1841–1906)

Personal details
- Born: 1 January 1841 Edinburgh, Scotland
- Died: 29 May 1906 (aged 65) Islington, New South Wales
- Party: Protectionist Party

William Grahame (1 January 1841 – 29 May 1906) was an Australian politician. He was a member of the New South Wales Legislative Assembly from 1889 until 1894 and a member of the Protectionist Party.

Grahame was born in Edinburgh, Scotland and after a minimal education worked as a labourer. He migrated to Australia in 1858 and laboured on road work until he found employment as a tenant farmer and contractor. He eventually kept a jewellery shop in Newcastle and served as an alderman on Wickham Municipal Council and as a member of the local water and sewage board. At the 1889 election, he was the third candidate on the Protectionist list and won the last position in the multi-member seat of Newcastle. However, Grahame was forced to resign from parliament in October 1889 when he became insolvent and he was defeated by James Curley at the subsequent by-election. He regained his seat in April 1891 at a by-election caused by the death of James Fletcher. Grahame was defeated at the 1894 election. He did not hold ministerial or party office.

New South Wales Legislative Assembly
Preceded by James Fletcher/James Ellis	Member for Newcastle; 1889 – 1889; Served alongside: Fletcher, Brown	Succeeded by James Curley
Preceded by James Fletcher	Member for Newcastle; 1891 – 1894; Served alongside: Curley/Fegan, Brown/Scott	Succeeded by William Dick
