= Georgiana (beetle) =

Georgiana xanthomelaena

Scientific classification
- Kingdom: Animalia
- Phylum: Arthropoda
- Class: Insecta
- Order: Coleoptera
- Suborder: Polyphaga
- Infraorder: Cucujiformia
- Family: Cerambycidae
- Genus: Georgiana
- Species: G. xanthomelaena

Binomial name
- Georgiana xanthomelaena (White, 1856)

Species of beetle

Georgiana xanthomelaena is a species of beetle in the family Cerambycidae, the only species in the genus Georgiana.
