= Electoral district of Wickham (New South Wales) =

Former state electoral district of New South Wales, Australia

Wickham was an electoral district of the Legislative Assembly in the Australian state of New South Wales and named after the Newcastle suburb of Wickham. It was created in 1894, when multi-member districts were abolished, and the three member district of Newcastle was divided between Wickham, Newcastle East, Newcastle West, Kahibah and Waratah. The first member was John Fegan (Free Trade) who was one of the members for Newcastle. It was abolished in 1920, with the introduction of proportional representation and combined with Newcastle. The sitting member William Grahame (Nationalist) unsuccessfully stood as an independent at the 1920 election for Newcastle.

== Members for Wickham ==
Member	Party	Term
John Fegan	Free Trade	1894–1899
John Fegan	Protectionist	1899–1901
John Fegan	Progressive	1901–1907
William Grahame	Labor	1907–1917
William Grahame	Nationalist	1917–1920

== Election results ==
1917 New South Wales state election: Wickham
Party	Candidate	Votes	%	±%
Nationalist	William Grahame	4,982	53.9	+22.1
Labor	Christopher Pattinson	4,260	46.1	−22.1
Total formal votes		9,242	99.2	+0.9
Informal votes		77	0.8	−0.9
Turnout		9,319	63.1	−10.0
Member changed to Nationalist from Labor				

The sitting member William Grahame was expelled from Labor in the November 1916 Labor split over conscription.
