= Electoral district of Newcastle East =

Former state electoral district of New South Wales, Australia

Newcastle East was an electoral district of the Legislative Assembly in the Australian state of New South Wales. It was created in 1894, when multi-member districts were abolished, and the three member district of Newcastle was divided between Newcastle East, Newcastle West, Kahibah, Waratah and Wickham. from 1894 to 1904, when it was abolished as a result of the 1903 New South Wales referendum, which required the number of members of the Legislative Assembly to be reduced from 125 to 90. Newcastle East was absorbed into the district of Newcastle.

== Members for Newcastle East ==
Member	Party	Term
William Dick	Free Trade	1894–1901
William Dick	Liberal Reform	1901–1904

== Election results ==
1901 New South Wales state election: Newcastle East
Party	Candidate	Votes	%	±%
Liberal Reform	William Dick	1,037	66.9	+6.7
Labour	James Curley	514	33.1	
Total formal votes		1,551	99.6	+1.3
Informal votes		7	0.5	−1.3
Turnout		1,558	69.0	+3.7
Liberal Reform hold				
