= Electoral district of Newcastle =

Electoral district of New South Wales

Newcastle New South Wales—Legislative Assembly
- Interactive map of district boundaries from the 2023 state election
- State: New South Wales
- Dates current: 1859–1894; 1904–present
- MP: Tim Crakanthorp
- Party: Labor Party
- Namesake: Newcastle
- Electors: 59,443 (2023)
- Area: 121.22 km^{2} (46.8 sq mi)
- Demographic: Inner-metropolitan
- Coordinates: 32°55′S 151°45′E
Electorates around Newcastle:
Wallsend	Port Stephens	Port Stephens
Wallsend	Newcastle	Pacific Ocean
Charlestown	Pacific Ocean	Pacific Ocean

Newcastle is an electoral district of the Legislative Assembly in the Australian state of New South Wales named after and including Newcastle. It is represented since the 2014 Newcastle by-election by Tim Crakanthorp of the Australian Labor Party.

== Geography ==
The district takes in the eastern part of the City of Newcastle, including the parts of the suburbs from Hexham to Mayfield lying to the east of the Main North railway line, Broadmeadow, Hamilton South, Merewether Heights and Merewether and the suburbs further east, including central Newcastle and Hamilton. It also includes the Port Stephens Council suburbs of Fern Bay and Fullerton Cove.

== History ==
Newcastle was created in 1859 from part of North Eastern Boroughs. It gained a second member in 1880 and a third member in 1889. With the abolition of multi-member electorates in 1894, it was divided into Newcastle East, Newcastle West, Kahibah, Waratah and Wickham. These changes to the electoral boundaries were debated. Newcastle was re-created in the 1904 re-distribution of electorates following the 1903 New South Wales referendum, which required the number of members of the Legislative Assembly to be reduced from 125 to 90. It consisted of Newcastle East and part of Newcastle West. With the introduction of proportional representation in 1920, it absorbed Kahibah, Wallsend and Wickham and elected five members. With the end of proportional representation in 1927, Newcastle was split into the single-member electorates of Newcastle, Hamilton, Kahibah and Wallsend.

It has since been usually held by the Labor Party. This pattern was threatened in early 2007, when sitting member Bryce Gaudry lost his preselection to a former local newsreader, Jodi McKay. Gaudry opted to stand as an independent and as a consequence split the Labor Party's vote. Independent former Lord Mayor of Newcastle John Tate came close to winning the seat after preferences but McKay managed to hold on. Labor's previous margin of over 15% had been slashed to as little as 1.4%, making it one of Labor's most marginal seats.

At the 2011 New South Wales state election, Liberal Tim Owen defeated incumbent and one-term member McKay and popular Independent Tate, marking the first time the Liberals or their predecessors had won Newcastle as a single-member seat in over a century. This was one of many gains the Liberals made in what was previously Labor heartland.

Owen became an independent and moved to the crossbench on 6 August 2014 after accusations at the Independent Commission Against Corruption (ICAC). He resigned from parliament on 12 August 2014 after evidence of corruption was uncovered. The Liberals opted not to contest the ensuing by-election, which saw Labor's Tim Crakanthorp reclaim the seat handily.

== Members for Newcastle ==
First incarnation (1859–1880, 1 member)
Member	Party	Term												
Arthur Hodgson	None	1859–1860												
James Hannell	None	1860–1869												
George Lloyd	None	1869–1877												
Richard Bowker	None	1877–1880												
(1880–1889, 2 members)
Member	Party	Term	Member	Party	Term									
James Fletcher	None	1880–1887	George Lloyd	None	1880–1882									
James Fletcher	None	1880–1887	James Ellis	None	1882–1885									
James Fletcher	None	1880–1887	George Lloyd	None	1885–1887									
James Fletcher	Protectionist	1887–1889	James Ellis	Free Trade	1887–1889									
(1889–1894, 3 members)
Member	Party	Term	Member	Party	Term	Member	Party	Term						
James Fletcher	Protectionist	1889–1891	Alexander Brown	Protectionist	1889–1891	William Grahame	Protectionist	1889–1889						
James Fletcher	Protectionist	1889–1891	Alexander Brown	Protectionist	1889–1891	James Curley	Free Trade	1889–1891						
William Grahame	Protectionist	1891–1894	David Scott	Labor	1891–1894	John Fegan	Labor	1891–1894						
Second incarnation (1904–1920, 1 member)
Member	Party	Term												
William Dick	Liberal Reform	1904–1907												
Owen Gilbert	Liberal Reform	1907–1910												
Arthur Gardiner	Labor	1910–1917												
Arthur Gardiner	Independent Labor	1917–1920												
(1920–1927, 5 members)
Member	Party	Term	Member	Party	Term	Member	Party	Term	Member	Party	Term	Member	Party	Term
Arthur Gardiner	Independent	1920–1922	John Estell	Labor	1920–1922	John Fegan	Nationalist	1920–1922	William Kearsley	Labor	1920–1921	Hugh Connell	Labor	1920–1927
Arthur Gardiner	Independent	1920–1922	John Estell	Labor	1920–1922	John Fegan	Nationalist	1920–1922	David Murray	Labor	1921–1927	Hugh Connell	Labor	1920–1927
Walter Skelton	Independent	1922–1925	Jack Baddeley	Labor	1922–1927	Magnus Cromarty	Nationalist	1922–1925	David Murray	Labor	1921–1927	Hugh Connell	Labor	1920–1927
Walter Skelton	Protestant Labour	1925–1927	Jack Baddeley	Labor	1922–1927	George Booth	Labor	1925–1927	David Murray	Labor	1921–1927	Hugh Connell	Labor	1920–1927
(1927–present, 1 member)
Member	Party	Term												
Peter Connolly	Labor	1927–1935												
Frank Hawkins	Labor	1935–1968												
Arthur Wade	Labor	1968–1988												
George Keegan	Independent	1988–1991												
Bryce Gaudry	Labor	1991–2007												
Bryce Gaudry	Independent	2007–2007												
Jodi McKay	Labor	2007–2011												
Tim Owen	Liberal	2011–2014												
Tim Owen	Independent	2014–2014												
Tim Crakanthorp	Labor	2014–present												

== Election results ==
2023 New South Wales state election: Newcastle
Party	Candidate	Votes	%	±%
Labor	Tim Crakanthorp	25,078	49.4	+3.6
Liberal	Thomas Triebsees	11,348	22.4	−4.1
Greens	John Mackenzie	9,487	18.7	+2.0
Legalise Cannabis	Tim Claydon	3,042	6.0	+6.0
Sustainable Australia	Freya Taylor	1,195	2.4	0.0
Socialist Alliance	Niko Leka	586	1.2	−0.6
Total formal votes		50,736	97.8	+1.0
Informal votes		1,162	2.2	−1.0
Turnout		51,898	87.3	+0.4
Two-party-preferred result
Labor	Tim Crakanthorp	33,422	72.6	+5.1
Liberal	Thomas Triebsees	12,620	27.4	−5.1
Labor hold		Swing	+5.1	
