= Georgiana (1818 ship) =

History

United Kingdom
- Name: Georgiana
- Owner: 1832:Scott Fairlie & Co.; Later:Joseph Horsley, London
- Laid down: March 1817, Coringa, or Chittagong, or Calcutta
- Launched: 15 December 1818, or 1819, or 1820
- Fate: Last listed 1844

General characteristics
- Type: Barque
- Tons burthen: 406, or 40639/94, or 422, or 440 (bm)
- Length: 116 ft 0 in (35.4 m)
- Beam: 29 ft 6 in (9.0 m)
- Propulsion: Sail
- Notes: Teak-built

Georgiana was built in British India c.1819, probably in late 1818. She traded in the Far East for most of her career, and between India and London. She made one voyage under charter to the British East India Company (EIC). She also brought immigrants to Australia. She was last listed in Lloyd's Register in 1844.

== Career ==
She first appeared in Lloyd's Register (LR) in 1821 with Worthington, master, J.Macrae, owner, and trade Liverpool—Calcutta.

Year	Master	Owner	Trade	Source
1825	Worthington	J.Macrae	Liverpool–Calcutta	LR
1830	W.Haylett; Tullis	Capt. & Co.	London–Madras	LR
1831	Tullis	Fowler & Co.	London–Calcutta	LR
1832	Tullis; Clement	Fowler & Co.	London–Calcutta	LR
1833	H.Clement	Scott & Co.	London–Bengal	LR

EIC voyage (1832–1833): The EIC chartered Georgiana from Messrs Scott Fairlie & Co. for one voyage to Bengal at a rate of £9 9s 6d per ton. Captain Walter Young sailed from Portsmouth on 3 September 1832 and arrived in Calcutta on 23 January 1833. Homeward bound, Georgiana was at Saugor on 16 March, reached St Helena on 23 June, and arrived at Gravesend on 4 September.

Year	Master	Owner	Trade	Source
1839	Sheridan	Thom	London–Sydney	LR
1840	Sheridan; Stephenson	Thom	London–Sydney	LR

Immigrant voyage (1839-1840): Georgiana, under the command of Captain George Stephenson, departed Leith, Scotland, on 14 March 1839 with 70 passengers and a general cargo, bound for South Australia. She arrived Adelaide 28 August and after discharging her cargo and passengers she began to take on cargo for Sydney. She left Adelaide 9 October and arrived Port Jackson on 21 October. She left Sydney on 15 March 1840, bound for Liverpool.

Immigrant voyage (1840–1841): Georgiana, under Captain Stephenson, sailed from Liverpool on 4 October 1840. The surgeon-superintendent, in charge of the health of the bounty (government funded) passengers, was Dr Richard Bowker. He kept a diary, later published, in which he recorded more than a dozen deaths, mainly infants, due to an outbreak of scarlet fever. There was also considerable discord between passengers and crew. She sailed via the Cape of Good Hope and arrived at Port Phillip on 19 February 1841. The vessel was placed in quarantine because of the disease aboard. She disembarked some 212 mainly bounty immigrants. Most of the male immigrants were immediately offered employment.

Many complaints from the passengers about the conduct of Captain Stephenson and his crew prompted Charles La Trobe, Superintendent of the Port Phillip District, to convene an inquiry into the matter. La Trobe wrote that, "I must consider that Mr Stephenson's conduct was undoubtedly rough and harsh towards the immigrants, perhaps at times unwarrentably so," but, "in adopting harsh measures occasionally he was actuated by a determination to preserve order and cleanliness among the immigrants." He recommended that the captain's gratuity of £28 for transporting the immigrants be paid. At least one of the passengers was happy with Captain Stephenson as she married him shortly after arrival. His young wife soon became a young widow when Captain Stephenson died in Melbourne in June 1841. His casket was followed to the cemetery by the captains of all the vessels in port. On 9 July, Georgiana cleared out for Calcutta under the command of her new master, Captain Robinson.

== Fate ==
Georgiana was last listed in 1844 with Thom, owner, and trade Liverpool–Port Philip.
