= Alexander Brown (Australian politician) =

Australian politician

Alexander Brown (9 February 1851 – 28 March 1926) was an Australian politician.

Brown was born in Maitland, New South Wales, and educated at Fraser's private school, West Maitland. He married Mary Ellen Ribbands in August 1872 and they had three daughters and six sons. He was trained as a solicitor, but did not practice. He became a mine-owner pastoralist and businessman.

Brown was the member for Newcastle in the New South Wales Legislative Assembly from February 1889 to June 1891, elected as a Protectionist. In August 1892 he was appointed to the New South Wales Legislative Council, where he remained until his death in East Maitland. He married his second wife, Edith Mary Adams, in March 1920.

New South Wales Legislative Assembly
Preceded by James Ellis	Member for Newcastle; 1889 – 1891; Served alongside: Fletcher, Grahame/Curley	Succeeded by John Fegan
