= William Calman Grahame =

Australian politician

Caricature by David Low

William Calman Grahame, known as W. C. Grahame, (3 February 1863 – 15 September 1945) was a member of the New South Wales Legislative Assembly, representing Wickham from 1907 to 1920. Grahame served as Minister for Agriculture under Premier William Holman in both the Labor ministry and Nationalist ministry. Wickham was abolished in 1920, with the introduction of proportional representation and combined with Newcastle and Grahame unsuccessfully stood as an independent at the 1920 election for Newcastle.

He was also the first mayor of the recreated Municipality of Gosford, from 1936 to 1944. Central Coast Stadium (Bluetongue Stadium) in Gosford was formerly known as Grahame Park, named after him in 1939.

New South Wales Legislative Assembly
Preceded by John Fegan	Member for Wickham; 1907–1920	District abolished
Political offices
Preceded by William Ashford	Minister for Agriculture; 1915–1920	Succeeded by William Ashford
Civic offices
New office	Mayor of the Municipality of Gosford; 1936–1940	Succeeded by Ralph Randall Mortimer
