= George Keegan =

Australian politician

George Keegan OAM

Member of the New South Wales Parliament for Newcastle
- In office 19 March 1988 – 3 May 1991
- Preceded by: Arthur Wade
- Succeeded by: Bryce Gaudry

Personal details
- Born: 16 September 1928 Sydney, Australia
- Died: 25 November 2008 (aged 80) Lake Macquarie Private Hospital; Gateshead, New South Wales, Australia
- Party: Independent

Ernest George Keegan OAM (16 September 1928 – 25 November 2008) was an Australian politician. He served as an independent member for Newcastle in the New South Wales Legislative Assembly from 19 March 1988 to 3 May 1991.

Keegan attended Adamstown Public School and Cooks Hill High Schoolfor secondary schooling. Before entering politics, Keegan was a self-employed real estate agent and licensed valuer.

Keegan sought and won by a 5.3-point margin the extremely safe Labor party seat of Newcastle at the 1988 New South Wales state election which saw the landslide defeat of the Barrie Unsworth Labor Government which had collectively been in power for well over a decade. He sought re-election at the 1991 New South Wales state election however was defeated by the new Labor candidate.

Keegan had two sons from his first marriage to Laurel Woollett, and at the time of his death was married to Jeanette Ballard and also had two stepdaughters. He was a foundation member of the Newcastle Cruising Yacht Club. Keegan died on 25 November 2008 in the Newcastle suburb of Gateshead, New South Wales after a severe Heart Attack the week before. His funeral was held at Newcastle's Christ Church Cathedral and was attended by some 700 mourners. he is survived by two sons, Stuart and Owen and 3 grandchildren, Sean, Amanda and Eloise.

New South Wales Legislative Assembly
Preceded by Arthur Wade	Member for Newcastle; 1988–1991	Succeeded by Bryce Gaudry
