= Bryce Gaudry =

Australian politician (1942–2019)

Bryce James Gaudry (23 November 1942 – 4 October 2019) was an Australian politician who served as the member for Newcastle in the New South Wales Legislative Assembly.

Gaudry was educated at Kendall District Rural School, Taree High School and Newcastle Teachers' College. He received a Bachelor of Arts from the University of New South Wales and Macquarie University and became a physical education teacher. He was married with two adult children.

Gaudry represented Newcastle for the Labor Party from 1991 to 2007. He was associated with the soft left of NSW Labor. In May 2003 he was appointed as a parliamentary secretary by New South Wales Premier Bob Carr following the state election earlier that year. In 2006, the Labor Party State Executive deselected him in favour of the Labor Right-aligned Jodi McKay, the preferred candidate of then-premier Morris Iemma. The deselection occurred after Gaudry had revealed that the Labor government were planning to privatise the state's electricity system. The controversy around the selection led to around 130 members of the Newcastle ALP branches, then the largest in the state, leaving or being expelled. On 29 January 2007, Gaudry announced his resignation from the Labor Party and his intention to run as an independent candidate at the next state election. Gaudry was subsequently defeated in the 2007 general election by the new Labor candidate, Jodi McKay. However, McKay lost the seat at the following election in 2011.

Gaudry died on 4 October 2019 after a long battle with pancreatic cancer.

New South Wales Legislative Assembly
Preceded by George Keegan	Member for Newcastle; 1991–2007	Succeeded by Jodi McKay
