= James Ellis (Australian politician) =

Australian politician

James Cole Ellis (16 September 1843 – 7 July 1930) was an Australian politician.

Ellis was born in Jersey and migrated to Victoria in 1854 and moved to New South Wales in 1857. He became a major ship-owner in Newcastle and acquired waterfront property in Pyrmont in Sydney. He married Maria Kramer in 1863 and they had one daughter and six sons.

In 1882, Ellis was elected as a member for Newcastle in the New South Wales Legislative Assembly and held the seat until 1889. He was appointed to the New South Wales Legislative Council in 1891, but resigned in 1894 to successfully contest Newcastle West, which he held until 1895.

Ellis married Anne Johnson in 1922. He died in the Sydney suburb of Woollahra.

== Notes ==
New South Wales Legislative Assembly
Preceded by George Lloyd	Member for Newcastle; 1882 – 1885; Served alongside: Fletcher	Succeeded by George Lloyd
Preceded by George Lloyd	Member for Newcastle; 1887 – 1889; Served alongside: Fletcher	Succeeded by Alexander Brown; William Grahame
Preceded by New seat	Member for Newcastle West; 1894 – 1895	Succeeded by James Thomson
