= David Scott (New South Wales politician) =

Australian politician

David Scott (1848 – 10 January 1927) was an Australian politician, elected as a member of the New South Wales Legislative Assembly.

Scott was born at Newcastle upon Tyne, England and began work in a brickfield when ten years old. He served apprenticeship as an ironmoulder. He travelled to New South Wales in 1874 and settled in Newcastle and became a foreman ironmoulder with the Rodgers engineering works. He spent two years in California. He married Margaret Malone in about 1878 and they had issue three daughters and six sons.

Scott was elected as the member for Newcastle in 1891, but was defeated in 1894. In 1917 he married for the second time to Emma Roe, but they had no children. He died in the Newcastle suburb of Adamstown.

New South Wales Legislative Assembly
Preceded by James Fletcher	Member for Newcastle; 1891–1894; Served alongside: Fegan, Grahame	Succeeded by Abolished
