= George Lloyd (politician) =

Australian politician

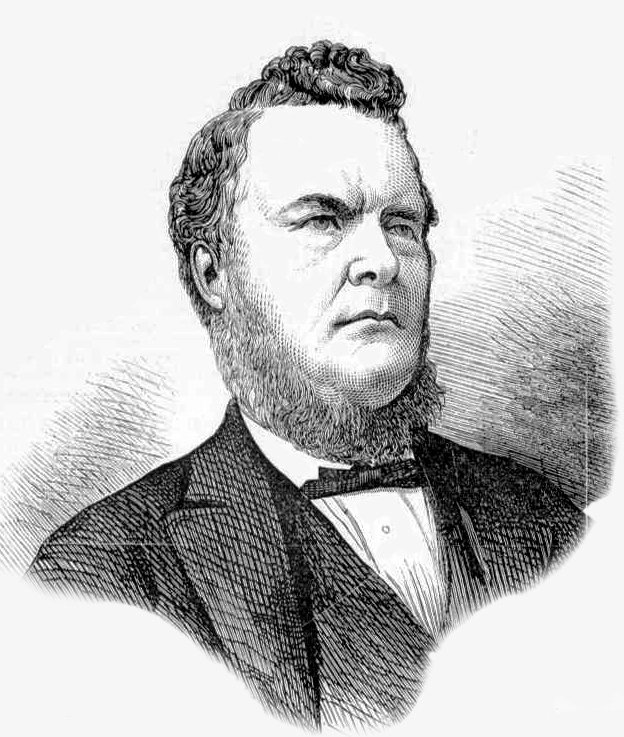
George Lloyd, 1874 engraving

George Alfred Lloyd (14 November 1815 – 25 December 1897) was an Australian politician, elected as a member for Newcastle from 1869 to 1877, 1880 to 1882 and 1885 to 1887.

== Early life ==
Lloyd was born in Norwood, Surrey, England and educated at Aske's Hospital School, London. His father's business failed in and he was sent to work for a family friend in Sydney in 1833. He opened a store and was postmaster at Hinton, near Raymond Terrace on the Hunter River. After his employer's bankruptcy, he became a farmer on the Williams River and then an auctioneer in Sydney. He married Mary Threlkeld in July 1841 and they had eleven children. With the discovery of gold, he moved into the gold related businesses of quartz crushing and gold escorting and then invested in shipping. He returned to London in 1855 and his company, Lloyd, Beilby & Co., acted as commercial agents to the Government of New South Wales until 1859, when he went bankrupt due to losses on his shipping business. In 1860, after discharging his bankruptcy, he returned to Sydney to re-establish himself in business.

== Political career ==
Lloyd won the seat of Newcastle in the New South Wales Legislative Assembly against James Martin, three times premier, in December 1869, advocating free trade, immigration, compulsory education, railway extension and a local harbour trust. He was Postmaster-General in Henry Parkes' first government from May to December 1872, when he became Colonial Treasurer. He introduced the penny postage to areas within ten miles of Sydney. He also abolished tariffs, duty on the postage of newspapers and tonnage dues at Newcastle, Wollongong and Kiama. In March 1877, he was Secretary for Mines in Parkes' second government, but lost his seat in October 1877.

Lloyd went bankrupt again in 1878. He won Newcastle back in 1880, lost it in 1882, won it again in 1885 and lost it 1887. Lloyd was a founder, auditor and original shareholder of the Australian Mutual Provident Society. He was appointed to the New South Wales Legislative Council in February 1887, but was largely inactive in it after 1889.

== Late life and legacy ==
Lloyd died on 25 December 1897 (aged 82), at his home, Scotforth, in the Sydney suburb of Elizabeth Bay, survived by five sons and three daughters.

== Notes ==
Parliament of New South Wales
Political offices
| Preceded by Joseph Docker | Postmaster-General; May – Dec 1872 | Succeeded by Saul Samuel |
| Preceded by William Piddington | Colonial Treasurer; 1872 – 1875 | Succeeded by William Forster |
| Preceded by John Lucas | Secretary for Mines; Feb – Aug 1877 | Succeeded by Ezekiel Baker |
| Preceded by Joseph Innes | Representative of the Government in the Legislative Council; 1872 – 1873 | Succeeded by Joseph Docker |
New South Wales Legislative Assembly
| Preceded by James Hannell | Member for Newcastle; 1869 – 1877 | Succeeded by Richard Bowker |
| Preceded by Richard Bowker | Member for Newcastle; 1880 – 1882; Served alongside: James Fletcher | Succeeded by James Ellis |
| Preceded by James Ellis | Member for Newcastle; 1885 – 1887; Served alongside: James Fletcher | Succeeded by James Ellis |
