= James Fletcher (Australian politician) =

Australian politician (1834–1891)

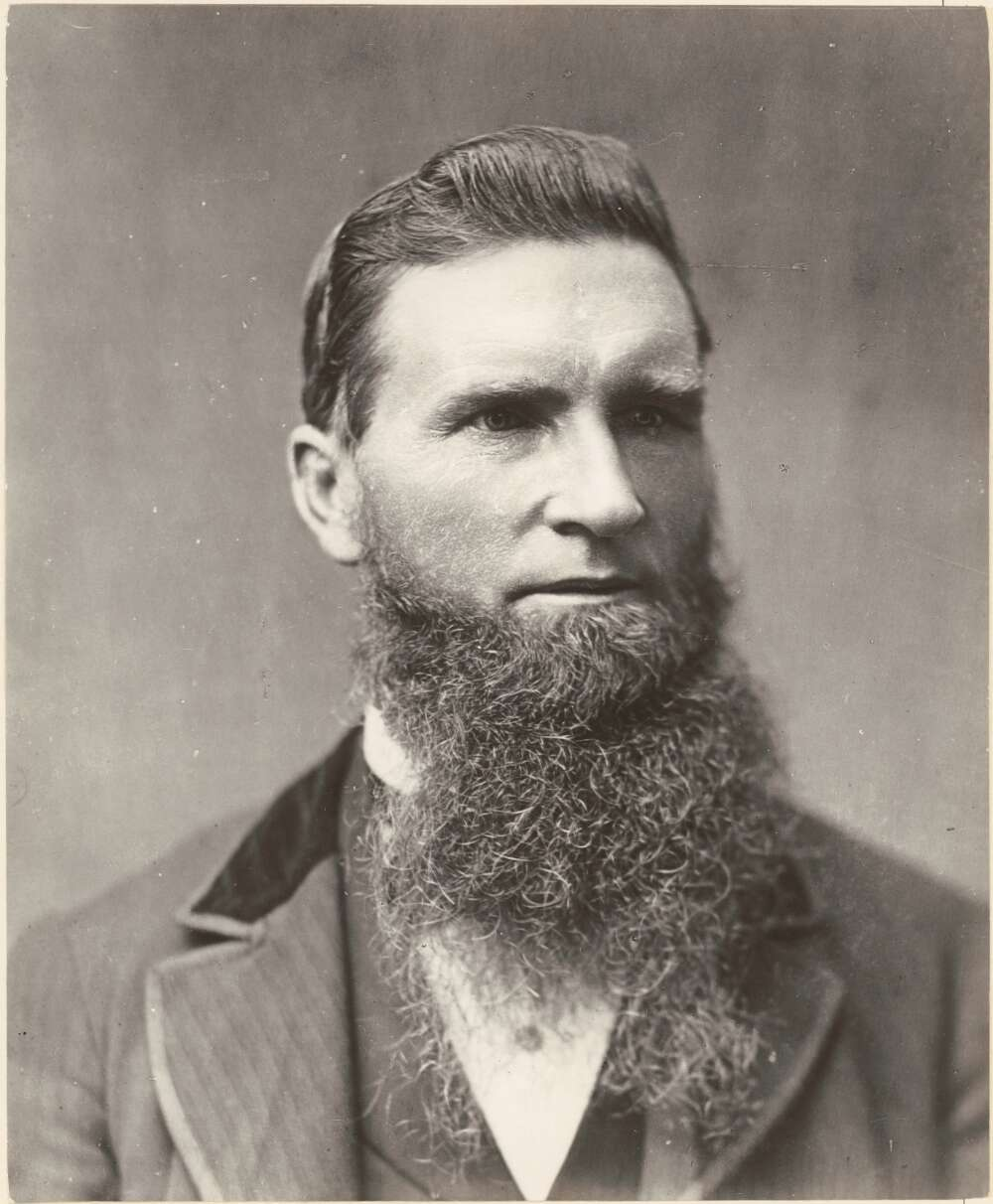

James Fletcher (August 1834 – 19 March 1891) was an Australian coalminer and owner, newspaper proprietor and politician, a member of the New South Wales Legislative Assembly.

== Early life and migration ==
Fletcher was born in Dalkeith, East Lothian, Scotland to parents of William Fletcher and Anne Fletcher. Migrated to Australia in February 1851, first working in the goldfields and later in the Newcastle area as a coalminer.

== Union organisation and mine management ==
He married Isabella Birrell in 1854. He was responsible in setting up Australia's Agricultural Co's sick and accident fund. In 1860 he was elected chairman of the new Hunter River Miners' Association, which soon became involved in New South Wales's first serious industrial action, when the mine owners tried unsuccessfully to reduce payments to miners by twenty percent. The union then attempted to establish a mining cooperative, New South Wales Co-operative Coal Co, under Fletcher's leadership, but it failed. He then managed a mine at Minmi, but returned to manage the cooperative—which had been revived—until 1880. He also managed the Wickham and Bullock Island Coal Co. and was part-owner of Ferndale Colliery.

== Political career ==
He was mayor of Wallsend in 1874 and 1875 and nearby Plattsburg in 1878. In 1876-89 he owned the Newcastle Morning Herald and Miners' Advocate. In 1884 he ran into financial difficulties and was sued by James Brown to recover loss and his friends helped him raise the £4,000.

Fletcher was elected as a Protectionist Party member for Newcastle in the New South Wales Legislative Assembly, serving from 1880 until his death in 1891. He was appointed Secretary for Mines in February 1886 in the Jennings ministry, but resigned in December. He was Secretary for Public Works from January to March 1889 in the second Dibbs ministry. In the 1880s and 1890s he was a successful mediator of strikes and was appointed royal commissioner on strikes in 1890.

== Death ==
Due to poor health he visited Victoria and Tasmania. Fletcher died from heart disease and apoplexy in Melbourne on 19 March 1891 (aged 56), survived by his wife, six sons and three daughters.

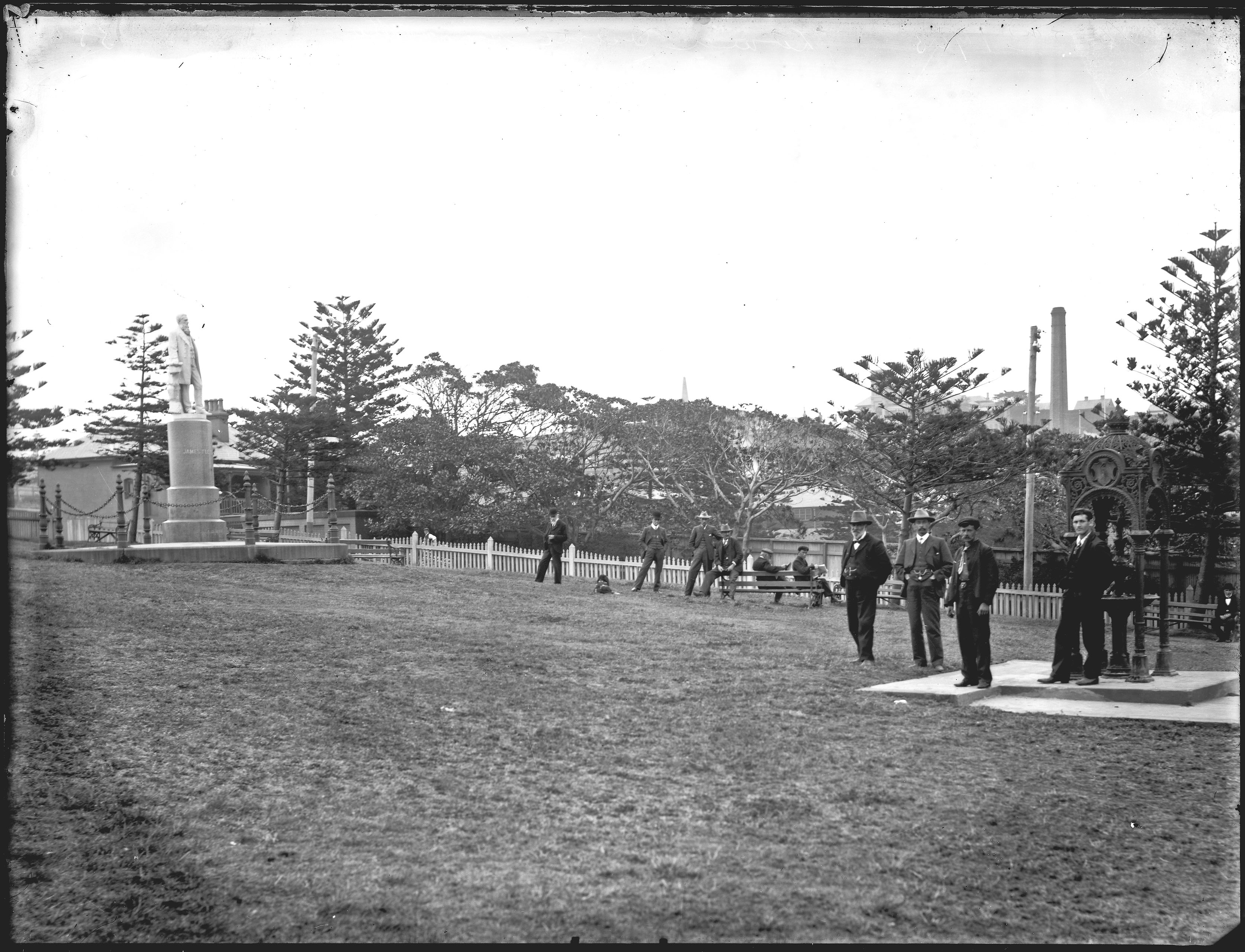
Fletcher Park, Newcastle, New South Wales, 2 November 1905. Far Left, a statue commemorating James Fletcher.

Parliament of New South Wales
Political offices
Preceded by Robert Vaughn	Secretary for Mines; February – December 1886	Succeeded by Charles Mackellar
Preceded by John Sutherland	Secretary for Public Works; January – March 1889	Succeeded by Bruce Smith
New South Wales Legislative Assembly
Preceded by Richard Bowker	Member for Newcastle; 1880 – 1891; With: Lloyd / Ellis / Brown none / Grahame / Curley	Succeeded by William Grahame
Civic offices
First	Mayor of Wallsend; 1874 – 1875	Succeeded by Robert Weakley
Civic offices
Preceded by James Birrell	Mayor of Plattsburg; August 1878 – February 1879	Succeeded by James Richardson
