= Electoral district of Newcastle West =

Former state electoral district of New South Wales, Australia

Newcastle West was an electoral district of the Legislative Assembly in the Australian state of New South Wales. It was originally created in 1894, when multi-member districts were abolished, and the three member district of Newcastle was divided between Newcastle West, Newcastle East, Kahibah, Waratah and Wickham. It was abolished in 1904 as a result of the 1903 New South Wales referendum, which required the number of members of the Legislative Assembly to be reduced from 125 to 90. Parts of Newcastle West were absorbed into the districts of Wickham, Newcastle and Kahibah.

== Members for Newcastle West ==
Member	Party	Term
James Ellis	Free Trade	1894–1895
James Thomson	Labour	1895–1901
Owen Gilbert	Liberal Reform	1901–1904

== Election results ==
1901 New South Wales state election: Newcastle West
Party	Candidate	Votes	%	±%
Liberal Reform	Owen Gilbert	802	57.9	
Progressive	Emmanuel Flynn	316	22.8	−23.6
Labour	Thomas Green	267	19.3	−34.3
Total formal votes		1,385	99.4	−0.5
Informal votes		9	0.7	+0.5
Turnout		1,394	70.8	+7.5
Liberal Reform gain from Labour				

The sitting member was James Thomson (Labour) who did not contest the election.
