= Owen Gilbert =

Australian politician (1868–1934)

Owen Gilbert (1868 – 13 November 1934) was an Australian politician. He was a Liberal Reform Party member of the New South Wales Legislative Assembly from 1901 to 1910, representing the electorates of Newcastle West (1901–1904) and Newcastle (1904–1910).

Owen was born in Raymond Terrace, New South Wales and spent early years in Wallsend. He became a schoolteacher in 1885, with his first posting at Minmi, and taught for sixteen years in various New South Wales towns, including Junee and Goulburn, before finishing his teaching career at Hamilton. He was also involved in the Newcastle community, serving as secretary of the Newcastle Show. A one-time member of his local Labor League in the early 1890s, Gilbert was a committed free-trader by the time of Federation, and resigned from his teaching post in 1901 to contest the inaugural 1901 federal election as a Free Trade Party candidate in the seat of Newcastle; however, he was soundly defeated.

Following his federal loss, Gilbert contested and won the New South Wales Legislative Assembly seat of Newcastle West for the Liberal Reform Party at the 1901 state election three months later. He was re-elected for Newcastle in 1904 after an electoral redistribution and again for that seat in 1907. As local MP, was reported to have been influential in the establishment of the Stockton ferry service. He was defeated by a Labor candidate at the 1910 state election. He unsuccessfully contested Mudgee at the 1913 state election, and continued to campaign for conservative candidates into the 1920s.

In 1914, after a stint as a paid organiser for the Liberal Reform Party, he was appointed as secretary to the State Quarries by the state Labor government and relocated to Sydney. He worked for the State Quarries for many years thereafter. At the time of his death in 1934, he was residing in Paddington. Having reportedly had a history of heart problems, he collapsed on Oxford Street in Darlinghurst and died in the Sydney Hospital.

== Notes ==
New South Wales Legislative Assembly
Preceded by James Thomson	Member for Newcastle West; 1901 – 1904	Succeeded by Abolished
Preceded by William Dick	Member for Newcastle; 1907 – 1910	Succeeded by Arthur Gardiner
