= William Dick (Australian politician) =

Politician, teacher, actuary and barrister in New South Wales, Australia

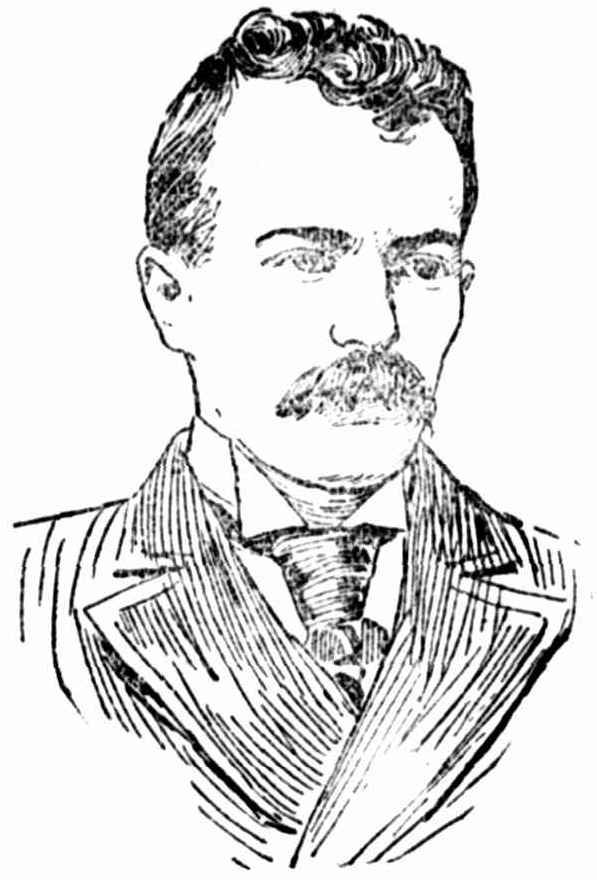

William Thomas Dick (16 January 1865 (Note: His parliamentary biography gives his birth date as 15 January 1865, which would make him aged 67 at his death, while a profile in the Newcastle Morning Herald and Miners' Advocate gives his year of birth as 1866, and his death notice states he was aged 66 when he died.) – 1 July 1932) was a politician, teacher, actuary and barrister in New South Wales, Australia.

Dick was born in Sydney the eldest son of Eliza and William Dick, a police officer. He was educated at Fort Street High School, before the family moved to Newcastle in the late 1870s where his father became a senior sergeant. He completed his education at Newcastle Superior Public School. He taught at the state school in the Newcastle suburb of Wickham from 1881 to 1884, at Fort Street Training School (Sydney) 1884 to 1885 and Dulwich Public School (Sydney) 1885 from 1887. He earned a Bachelor of Arts with honours at the University of Sydney in 1890, and opened a private school in Newcastle. He qualified as an actuary in 1894. He married Anna Helena Poulson in May 1892 and they had three daughters and three sons.

Dick was elected as a Free Trade Party member for Newcastle East the New South Wales Legislative Assembly in 1894, which he held until its abolition in 1904, joining the Liberal Reform Party on its formation in 1901. Having been a teacher and actuary, he then had a further career change, being admitted as a barrister in 1902. Newcastle East was largely replaced by Newcastle which he won at the 1904 election. He was appointed a minister without portfolio in the Carruthers ministry from 29 August 1904 until 1 October 1907. He did not contest the 1907 election, having accepted a life appointment to the Legislative Council, serving until his death and did not hold any further ministerial or parliamentary office. He joined the Nationalist Party in 1917 and its successor the United Australia Party in 1931.

He had chambers in Phillip Street until 1920, before apparently retiring in 1925, listing his chambers as a residential address in Bondi.

He died at his home in Bondi on 1 July 1932 (aged 66–67), survived by his wife Anna, 3 daughters, Daisy, Hollis and Leslie, and 2 sons, Harry and Robert.

== Notes ==
New South Wales Legislative Assembly
Preceded by New district	Member for Newcastle East; 1894 – 1904	Succeeded by District abolished
Preceded by New district	Member for Newcastle; 1904 – 1907	Succeeded by Owen Gilbert
