= James Curley (Australian politician) =

Australian politician

James Curley (1 February 1846 – 27 March 1913) was an Australian politician.

He was elected as the member for Newcastle in the New South Wales Legislative Assembly at a by-election in 1889. He remained in office for less than two years.

New South Wales Legislative Assembly
Preceded by William Grahame	Member for Newcastle; 1889 – 1891; Served alongside: Brown, Fletcher	Succeeded by William Grahame
