= Electoral results for the district of Balmain =

Election results for Balmain, New South Wales, Australia

Balmain, an electoral district of the Legislative Assembly in the Australian state of New South Wales, has had three incarnations since it was established in 1880. It expanded from 1 to 2 to 3 to 4 members before being abolished in 1894. It was re-established in 1904 returning 1 member until 1920. When multiple member constituencies were established using the Hare-Clark single transferable vote in 1920, Balmain returned 5 members. It had a single member from 1927 when the state returned to single member electorates. It was abolished in 1991 and largely replaced by Port Jackson which included the Sydney CBD. It was re-established in 2007 when Port Jackson was abolished.

Election	Member	Party								
1880	Jacob Garrard	None	Member	Party						
1882	Jacob Garrard	None	William Hutchinson	None	Member	Party				
1885	Jacob Garrard	None	Solomon Hyam	None	John Hawthorne	None				
1887	Jacob Garrard	Free Trade	Frank Smith	Free Trade	John Hawthorne	Free Trade	Member	Party		
1889	Jacob Garrard	Free Trade	Frank Smith	Free Trade	John Hawthorne	Free Trade	George Clubb	Free Trade		
1890 by	Jacob Garrard	Free Trade	Frank Smith	Free Trade	John Hawthorne	Free Trade	George Clubb	Free Trade		
1891	George Clark	Labour / Free Trade	Edward Darnley	Labour	James Johnston	Labour	William Murphy	Labour		
Election	Member	Party								
1904	Walter Anderson	Liberal Reform								
1907	John Storey	Labor								
1910	John Storey	Labor								
1913	John Storey	Labor								
1917	John Storey	Labor	Member	Party	Member	Party	Member	Party	Member	Party
1920	John Storey	Labor	John Doyle	Labor	Robert Stuart-Robertson	Labor	John Quirk	Labor	Albert Smith	Nationalist
1921 Appt	Tom Keegan	Labor	John Doyle	Labor	Robert Stuart-Robertson	Labor	John Quirk	Labor	Albert Smith	Nationalist
1922	Tom Keegan	Labor	Robert Stopford	Nationalist	Robert Stuart-Robertson	Labor	John Quirk	Labor	Albert Lane	Nationalist
1925	Tom Keegan	Labor	H. V. Evatt	Labor	Robert Stuart-Robertson	Labor	John Quirk	Labor	Albert Lane	Nationalist
1927	H. V. Evatt	Labor								
1930	John Quirk	Labor								
1932	John Quirk	Labor (NSW)								
1935	John Quirk	Labor (NSW)								
1938	John Quirk	Labor								
1939 by	Mary Quirk	Labor / Labor (N-C)								
1941	Mary Quirk	Labor								
1944	Mary Quirk	Labor								
1947	Mary Quirk	Labor / Independent Labor								
1950	John McMahon	Labor								
1953	John McMahon	Labor								
1956	John McMahon	Labor								
1959	John McMahon	Labor								
1962	John McMahon	Labor								
1965	John McMahon	Labor								
1968	Roger Degen	Labor								
1971	Roger Degen	Labor								
1973	Roger Degen	Labor								
1976	Roger Degen	Labor								
1978	Roger Degen	Labor								
1981	Roger Degen	Labor								
1984	Peter Crawford	Labor								
1988	Dawn Fraser	Independent								
Election	Member	Party								
2007	Verity Firth	Labor								
2011	Jamie Parker	Greens								
2015	Jamie Parker	Greens								
2019	Jamie Parker	Greens								
2023	Kobi Shetty	Greens								

== Election results ==
=== Elections in the 2020s ===
==== 2023 ====
2023 New South Wales state election: Balmain
Party	Candidate	Votes	%	±%
Greens	Kobi Shetty	20,240	40.48	−2.25
Labor	Philippa Scott	18,555	37.11	+8.25
Liberal	Freya Leach	9,566	19.13	−0.90
Sustainable Australia	Stephen Bisgrove	1,189	2.38	+0.84
Public Education	Glen Stelzer	447	0.89	+0.89
Total formal votes		49,997	98.39	−0.05
Informal votes		820	1.61	+0.05
Turnout		50,817	86.45	−0.28
Notional two-party-preferred count
Labor	Philippa Scott	32,752	74.50	+4.05
Liberal	Freya Leach	11,208	25.50	−4.05
Two-candidate-preferred result
Greens	Kobi Shetty	22,118	51.80	−8.22
Labor	Philippa Scott	20,580	48.20	+8.22
Greens hold		Swing	−8.22	

=== Elections in the 2010s ===
==== 2019 ====
2019 New South Wales state election: Balmain
Party	Candidate	Votes	%	±%
Greens	Jamie Parker	21,065	42.73	+5.34
Labor	Elly Howse	14,227	28.86	−2.94
Liberal	Wenjie (Ben) Zhang	9,875	20.03	−4.85
Keep Sydney Open	Emilia Leonetti	2,268	4.60	+4.60
Animal Justice	Anita Finlayson	1,103	2.24	+0.29
Sustainable Australia	Angela Dunnett	761	1.54	+1.54
Total formal votes		49,299	98.44	+0.52
Informal votes		781	1.56	−0.52
Turnout		50,080	86.73	−1.60
Two-party-preferred result
Labor	Elly Howse	28,127	70.45	+4.70
Liberal	Wenjie (Ben) Zhang	11,795	29.55	−4.70
Two-candidate-preferred result
Greens	Jamie Parker	24,074	60.02	+5.29
Labor	Elly Howse	16,037	39.98	−5.29
Greens hold		Swing	+5.29	

==== 2015 ====
2015 New South Wales state election: Balmain
Party	Candidate	Votes	%	±%
Greens	Jamie Parker	17,556	37.4	+6.3
Labor	Verity Firth	14,930	31.8	+1.9
Liberal	Lyndon Gannon	11,682	24.9	−5.8
Cyclists	Patrick Fogarty	951	2.0	+2.0
Animal Justice	Michelle Nielsen	913	1.9	+1.9
No Land Tax	Gordon Brown	527	1.1	+1.1
Christian Democrats	Rhonda Avasalu	393	0.8	−0.1
Total formal votes		46,952	97.9	+0.8
Informal votes		999	2.1	−0.8
Turnout		47,951	88.3	+2.1
Notional two-party-preferred count
Labor	Verity Firth	25,840	65.8	+11.1
Liberal	Lyndon Gannon	13,456	34.2	−11.1
Two-candidate-preferred result
Greens	Jamie Parker	20,019	54.7	+4.3
Labor	Verity Firth	16,557	45.3	−4.3
Greens hold		Swing	+4.3	

==== 2011 ====
2011 New South Wales state election: Balmain
Party	Candidate	Votes	%	±%
Liberal	James Falk	14,860	32.6	+8.8
Greens	Jamie Parker	14,019	30.7	+1.2
Labor	Verity Firth	13,765	30.2	−9.1
Independent	Maire Sheehan	1,375	3.0	+3.0
Independent	Jane Ward	681	1.5	−1.6
Christian Democrats	Leeanne Gesling	426	0.9	+0.9
Independent Protectionist	Nicholas Folkes	289	0.6	+0.6
Independent	Jon Shapiro	223	0.5	+0.5
Total formal votes		45,638	97.5	+0.1
Informal votes		1,149	2.5	−0.1
Turnout		46,787	90.2	+0.4
Notional two-party-preferred count
Labor	Verity Firth	19,392	53.5	−14.3
Liberal	James Falk	16,850	46.5	+14.3
Two-candidate-preferred result
Greens	Jamie Parker	19,141	53.5	+7.2
Liberal	James Falk	16,664	46.5	+46.5
Greens gain from Labor		Swing	+7.2	

=== Elections in the 2000s ===
==== 2007 ====
2007 New South Wales state election: Balmain
Party	Candidate	Votes	%	±%
Labor	Verity Firth	16,562	39.2	−2.9
Greens	Rochelle Porteous	12,471	29.5	+0.2
Liberal	Peter Shmigel	10,031	23.8	+2.7
Independent	Jane Ward	1,297	3.1	+3.1
Independent	Jane Hyde	987	2.3	+2.3
Democrats	Edward Okulicz	881	2.1	−0.3
Total formal votes		42,229	97.5	−0.1
Informal votes		1,088	2.5	+0.1
Turnout		43,317	89.8	
Notional two-party-preferred count
Labor	Verity Firth	24,566	67.8	+0.2
Liberal	Peter Shmigel	11,659	32.2	−0.2
Two-candidate-preferred result
Labor	Verity Firth	17,933	53.7	−3.4
Greens	Rochelle Porteous	15,431	46.3	+3.4
Labor notional hold		Swing	−3.4	

==== 1991–2007 ====
District abolished

=== Elections in the 1980s ===
==== 1988 ====
1988 New South Wales state election: Balmain
Party	Candidate	Votes	%	±%
Labor	Peter Crawford	11,071	39.3	−21.5
Independent	Dawn Fraser	6,381	22.6	+22.6
Liberal	Geoffrey Courtney	5,383	19.1	−4.6
Community Independents	Larry Hand	2,422	8.6	+8.6
Independent	Jane Ward	1,990	7.1	+7.1
Democrats	William Cole	558	2.0	−5.4
Independent	Patricia Webster	370	1.3	+1.3
Total formal votes		28,175	96.3	+0.2
Informal votes		1,091	3.7	−0.2
Turnout		29,266	89.9	
Two-candidate-preferred result
Independent	Dawn Fraser	13,440	51.7	+51.7
Labor	Peter Crawford	12,576	48.3	−21.0
Independent gain from Labor		Swing	+51.7	

==== 1984 ====
1984 New South Wales state election: Balmain
Party	Candidate	Votes	%	±%
Labor	Peter Crawford	15,158	60.7	+1.5
Liberal	Gibson Bennie	6,003	24.0	+9.4
Socialist Labour	Noel Hazard	2,061	8.3	+5.5
Democrats	Karen McEwan	1,763	7.1	+0.1
Total formal votes		24,985	96.1	+0.7
Informal votes		1,025	3.9	−0.7
Turnout		26,010	89.0	+2.7
Two-party-preferred result
Labor	Peter Crawford		69.0	−12.0
Liberal	Gibson Bennie		31.0	+12.0
Labor hold		Swing	−12.0	

==== 1981 ====
1981 New South Wales state election: Balmain
Party	Candidate	Votes	%	±%
Labor	Roger Degen	14,444	59.2	−15.1
Liberal	Dianne Street	3,553	14.6	+0.3
Independent	Douglas Spedding	3,162	13.0	+13.0
Democrats	Franco Paisio	1,712	7.0	+7.0
Communist	Denis Freney	849	3.5	−0.5
Socialist	James Donovan	676	2.8	+2.8
Total formal votes		24,396	95.4	
Informal votes		1,167	4.6	
Turnout		25,563	86.3	
Two-party-preferred result
Labor	Roger Degen	19,044	81.0	−3.2
Liberal	Dianne Street	4,453	18.9	+3.2
Labor hold		Swing	−3.2	

=== Elections in the 1970s ===
==== 1978 ====
1978 New South Wales state election: Balmain
Party	Candidate	Votes	%	±%
Labor	Roger Degen	20,289	74.3	+7.0
Liberal	Ivor Balmain	3,906	14.3	−10.4
Socialist Workers	Lynda Boland	2,030	7.4	+3.9
Communist	Brian Aarons	1,102	4.0	+1.6
Total formal votes		27,327	96.4	−0.6
Informal votes		1,006	3.6	+0.6
Turnout		28,333	88.4	−0.8
Two-party-preferred result
Labor	Roger Degen	23,014	84.2	+10.0
Liberal	Ivor Balmain	4,313	15.8	−10.0
Labor hold		Swing	+10.0	

==== 1976 ====
1976 New South Wales state election: Balmain
Party	Candidate	Votes	%	±%
Labor	Roger Degen	19,204	67.3	−1.9
Liberal	Jeffrey Thompson	7,054	24.7	+24.7
Socialist Workers	Juanita Keig	1,002	3.5	+3.5
Communist	Peter Cockroft	680	2.4	+2.4
Independent	Donald Henderson	615	2.1	+2.1
Total formal votes		28,555	97.0	+2.4
Informal votes		875	3.0	−2.4
Turnout		29,430	89.2	−0.3
Two-party-preferred result
Labor	Roger Degen	21,188	74.2	−2.3
Liberal	Jeffrey Thompson	7,367	25.8	+25.8
Labor hold		Swing	−2.3	

==== 1973 ====
1973 New South Wales state election: Balmain
Party	Candidate	Votes	%	±%
Labor	Roger Degen	18,013	69.2	−3.8
Democratic Labor	Gary Doherty	4,196	16.1	+16.1
Australia	Rosemary Smith	3,839	14.7	+14.7
Total formal votes		26,048	94.6	
Informal votes		1,476	5.4	
Turnout		27,524	89.5	
Two-candidate-preferred result
Labor	Roger Degen	19,933	76.5	+3.5
Democratic Labor	Gary Doherty	6,115	23.5	+23.5
Labor hold		Swing	N/A	

==== 1971 ====
1971 New South Wales state election: Balmain
Party	Candidate	Votes	%	±%
Labor	Roger Degen	17,358	73.0	+23.0
Liberal	Robert Ward	6,423	27.0	+3.2
Total formal votes		23,781	95.9	
Informal votes		1,021	4.1	
Turnout		24,802	91.4	
Labor hold		Swing	+3.9	

=== Elections in the 1960s ===
==== 1968 ====
1968 New South Wales state election: Balmain
Party	Candidate	Votes	%	±%
Labor	Roger Degen	12,974	50.0	−14.5
Independent	Nick Origlass	6,794	26.2	+26.2
Liberal	Peter Middleton	6,174	23.8	−4.5
Total formal votes		25,942	96.5	
Informal votes		950	3.5	
Turnout		26,892	94.3	
Two-party-preferred result
Labor	Roger Degen	17,928	69.1	−1.2
Liberal	Peter Middleton	8,014	30.9	+1.2
Labor hold		Swing	−1.2	

- The two candidate preferred vote was not counted between the Labor and Independent candidates for Balmain.

==== 1965 ====
1965 New South Wales state election: Balmain
Party	Candidate	Votes	%	±%
Labor	John McMahon	13,689	64.5	−9.5
Liberal	Elton Lewis	5,992	28.2	+6.9
Communist	Harry Black	1,530	7.2	+2.5
Total formal votes		21,211	96.9	−0.8
Informal votes		682	3.1	+0.8
Turnout		21,893	94.0	0.0
Two-party-preferred result
Labor	John McMahon	14,913	70.3	−7.4
Liberal	Elton Lewis	6,298	29.7	+7.4
Labor hold		Swing	−7.4	

==== 1962 ====
1962 New South Wales state election: Balmain
Party	Candidate	Votes	%	±%
Labor	John McMahon	16,245	74.0	+3.6
Liberal	Winston Pickering	4,679	21.3	−2.1
Communist	Stanley Moran	1,030	4.7	−1.5
Total formal votes		21,954	97.7	
Informal votes		519	2.3	
Turnout		22,473	94.0	
Two-party-preferred result
Labor	John McMahon	17,069	77.7	+2.4
Liberal	Winston Pickering	4,885	22.3	−2.4
Labor hold		Swing	+2.4	

=== Elections in the 1950s ===
==== 1959 ====
1959 New South Wales state election: Balmain
Party	Candidate	Votes	%	±%
Labor	John McMahon	15,216	70.4	
Liberal	Sabina Greenman	5,067	23.4	
Communist	Stanley Moran	1,328	6.2	
Total formal votes		21,611	97.7	
Informal votes		511	2.3	
Turnout		22,122	93.1	
Two-party-preferred result
Labor	John McMahon	16,278	75.3	
Liberal	Sabina Greenman	5,333	24.7	
Labor hold		Swing		

==== 1956 ====
1956 New South Wales state election: Balmain
Party	Candidate	Votes	%	±%
Labor	John McMahon	14,613	67.3	−11.8
Liberal	Elton Lewis	5,643	26.0	+26.0
Communist	Stanley Moran	1,461	6.7	+0.2
Total formal votes		21,717	98.3	+2.1
Informal votes		384	1.7	−2.1
Turnout		22,101	92.9	0.0
Two-party-preferred result
Labor	John McMahon	15,928	75.3	−7.0
Liberal	Elton Lewis	5,789	24.7	+24.7
Labor hold		Swing	N/A	

==== 1953 ====
1953 New South Wales state election: Balmain
Party	Candidate	Votes	%	±%
Labor	John McMahon	17,887	79.1	
Independent	Arthur Doughty	3,267	14.5	
Communist	Stanley Moran	1,459	6.4	
Total formal votes		22,613	96.2	
Informal votes		892	3.8	
Turnout		23,505	92.9	
Two-candidate-preferred result
Labor	John McMahon	18,617	82.3	
Independent	Arthur Doughty	3,996	17.7	
Labor hold		Swing		

==== 1950 ====
1950 New South Wales state election: Balmain
Party	Candidate	Votes	%	±%
Labor	John McMahon	11,568	59.1	
Liberal	Frederick Mann	4,068	20.8	
Independent Labor	Mary Quirk	2,434	12.4	
Communist	Thomas Dowling	1,063	5.4	
Independent	Malinda Ivey	457	2.3	
Total formal votes		19,590	97.5	
Informal votes		499	2.5	
Turnout		20,089	93.8	
Two-party-preferred result
Labor	John McMahon		73.0 (Note: Two party preferred vote was estimated.)	
Liberal	Frederick Mann		27.0	
Labor hold		Swing		

Mary Quirk was the sitting Labor member, however she was defeated for pre-selection by John McMahon.

=== Elections in the 1940s ===
==== 1947 ====
1947 New South Wales state election: Balmain
Party	Candidate	Votes	%	±%
Labor	Mary Quirk	11,229	55.8	−2.5
Liberal	Eddington Sherwood	3,667	18.2	+4.7
Independent	Ronald Sarina	2,089	10.4	+10.4
Communist	Stanley Moran	1,788	8.9	−19.3
Independent	Malinda Ivey	1,340	6.7	+6.7
Total formal votes		20,113	96.2	−0.5
Informal votes		783	3.8	+0.5
Turnout		20,896	95.6	+2.4
Labor hold		Swing	N/A	

- Preferences were not distributed.

==== 1944 ====
1944 New South Wales state election: Balmain
Party	Candidate	Votes	%	±%
Labor	Mary Quirk	10,729	58.3	−2.3
Communist	Stanley Moran	5,186	28.2	+28.2
Democratic	Malinda Ivey	2,480	13.5	+13.5
Total formal votes		18,395	96.7	+1.5
Informal votes		618	3.3	−1.5
Turnout		19,013	93.2	−0.5
Labor hold		Swing	N/A	

- Preferences were not distributed.

==== 1941 ====
1941 New South Wales state election: Balmain
Party	Candidate	Votes	%	±%
Labor	Mary Quirk	11,427	60.6	
State Labor	Walter Evans	4,879	25.9	
Independent	Malinda Ivey	1,138	6.0	
Independent	Leslie Shiels	732	3.9	
Independent Labor	Arthur Doughty	672	3.6	
Total formal votes		18,848	95.2	
Informal votes		946	4.8	
Turnout		19,794	93.7	
Labor hold		Swing		

- Preferences were not distributed.

=== Elections in the 1930s ===
==== 1939 by-election ====
1939 Balmain by-election Saturday 14 January
Party	Candidate	Votes	%	±%
Labor	Mary Quirk	7,656	51.21	
Independent Labor	Sidney Weston	4,336	29.01	
Independent Labor	John O'Carroll	2,957	19.78	
Total formal votes		14,949	95.09	
Informal votes		772	4.91	
Turnout		15,721	90.12	
Labor hold		Swing		

John Quirk (Labor) died.

==== 1938 ====
1938 New South Wales state election: Balmain
Party	Candidate	Votes	%	±%
Labor	John Quirk	11,763	72.1	+8.2
Independent	John O'Carroll	3,089	18.9	+18.9
Communist	Thomas Payne	1,459	8.9	+3.7
Total formal votes		16,311	95.1	−2.1
Informal votes		844	4.9	+2.1
Turnout		17,155	96.6	−0.5
Labor hold		Swing	N/A	

- Preferences were not distributed.

==== 1935 ====
1935 New South Wales state election: Balmain
Party	Candidate	Votes	%	±%
Labor (NSW)	John Quirk	10,417	63.9	+4.1
Federal Labor	Allan Howie	5,046	30.9	−2.3
Communist	Lawrence Sharkey	849	5.2	+2.7
Total formal votes		16,312	97.2	−1.0
Informal votes		471	2.8	+1.0
Turnout		16,783	97.1	+0.3
Labor (NSW) hold		Swing	N/A	

- Preferences were not distributed.

==== 1932 ====
1932 New South Wales state election: Balmain
Party	Candidate	Votes	%	±%
Labor (NSW)	John Quirk	9,591	59.8	−16.2
Federal Labor	Peter Murray	5,329	33.2	+33.2
Independent	Arthur Arundel	720	4.5	+4.5
Communist	Joseph Crow	395	2.5	+2.5
Total formal votes		16,035	98.2	+0.8
Informal votes		286	1.8	−0.8
Turnout		16,321	96.8	+1.3
Labor (NSW) hold		Swing	N/A	

- Preferences were not distributed.

==== 1930 ====
1930 New South Wales state election: Balmain
Party	Candidate	Votes	%	±%
Labor	John Quirk	12,408	76.0	
Nationalist	Ernest Hind	3,243	19.9	
Independent	William Murphy	448	2.7	
Communist	John Sylvester	233	1.4	
Total formal votes		16,332	97.4	
Informal votes		435	2.6	
Turnout		16,767	95.5	
Labor gain from Independent Labor		Swing		

The sitting member H. V. Evatt (Independent Labor) was appointed to the High Court.

=== Elections in the 1920s ===
==== 1927 ====
This section is an excerpt from Results of the 1927 New South Wales state election § Balmain

1927 New South Wales state election: Balmain
Party	Candidate	Votes	%	±%
Independent Labor	H. V. Evatt	6,722	53.0	
Labor	Harry Doran	5,949	47.0	
Total formal votes		12,671	98.6	
Informal votes		182	1.4	
Turnout		12,853	87.0	
Independent Labor win		(new seat)		

==== 1925 ====
This section is an excerpt from Results of the 1925 New South Wales state election § Balmain

1925 New South Wales state election: Balmain
Party	Candidate	Votes	%	±%
Quota		7,727		
Labor	H. V. Evatt (elected 1)	14,733	31.8	+31.8
Labor	Robert Stuart-Robertson (elected 5)	4,567	9.9	−3.5
Labor	John Quirk (elected 4)	4,562	9.8	−3.5
Labor	Tom Keegan (elected 2)	4,305	9.3	−3.5
Labor	Kate Dwyer	3,622	7.8	+7.8
Nationalist	Albert Lane (elected 3)	6,306	13.6	+1.7
Nationalist	Robert Stopford (defeated)	5,880	12.7	−1.4
Nationalist	Stanley Cole	1,171	2.5	+2.5
Nationalist	Thomas Greentree	304	0.7	−3.6
Nationalist	Gideon Gillespie	189	0.4	+0.4
Protestant Labour	James Johnston	439	1.0	+1.0
Communist	Thomas Payne	199	0.4	+0.4
Communist	Lionel Leece	40	0.1	+0.1
Independent	Charles Mallett	42	0.1	+0.1
Total formal votes		46,359	97.0	+1.1
Informal votes		1,424	3.0	−1.1
Turnout		47,783	69.9	+0.9
Party total votes
Labor		31,789	68.6	+15.2
Nationalist		13,850	29.9	−11.3
Protestant Labour		439	1.0	+1.0
Communist		239	0.5	+0.5
Independent	Charles Mallett	42	0.1	+0.1

==== 1922 ====
This section is an excerpt from Results of the 1922 New South Wales state election § Balmain

1922 New South Wales state election: Balmain
Party	Candidate	Votes	%	±%
Quota		7,380		
Labor	Robert Stuart-Robertson (elected 5)	5,950	13.4	+4.3
Labor	John Quirk (elected 3)	5,903	13.3	+3.1
Labor	Tom Keegan (elected 4)	5,679	12.8	+4.4
Labor	John Doyle (defeated)	4,313	9.7	+2.1
Labor	David Ryan	1,780	4.0	+4.0
Nationalist	Robert Stopford (elected 2)	6,264	14.1	+1.4
Nationalist	Albert Lane (elected 1)	5,258	11.9	+11.9
Nationalist	Albert Smith (defeated)	3,294	7.4	−2.4
Nationalist	Thomas Greentree	1,884	4.3	+4.3
Nationalist	Alfred Henry	1,563	3.5	+3.5
Democratic	John Sheehy	2,163	4.9	+4.9
Industrial Labor	Henry Collins	64	0.1	+0.1
Industrial Labor	John Hood	63	0.1	+0.1
Independent	Solomon Amein	99	0.2	0.0
Total formal votes		44,277	95.9	+9.5
Informal votes		1,876	4.1	−9.5
Turnout		46,153	69.0	+14.7
Party total votes
Labor		23,625	53.4	−6.3
Nationalist		18,263	41.2	+18.8
Democratic		2,163	4.9	−2.4
Industrial Labor		127	0.3	+0.3
Independent	Solomon Amein	99	0.2	0.0

==== 1921 appointment ====
The Premier John Storey died on 5 October 1921. Between 1920 and 1927 the Legislative Assembly was elected using a form of proportional representation with multi-member seats and a single transferable vote (modified Hare-Clark). Under the provisions of the Parliamentary Elections (Casual Vacancies) Act, casual vacancies were filled by the next unsuccessful candidate on the incumbent member's party list. Tom Keegan was the only unsuccessful Labor candidate at the 1920 election and took his seat on 18 October 1921.

==== 1920 ====
This section is an excerpt from Results of the 1920 New South Wales state election § Balmain

1920 New South Wales state election: Balmain
Party	Candidate	Votes	%	±%
Quota		5,147		
Labor	John Storey (elected 1)	7,527	24.4	
Labor	John Quirk (elected 3)	3,137	10.2	
Labor	Robert Stuart-Robertson (elected 4)	2,821	9.1	
Labor	Tom Keegan (defeated)	2,603	8.4	
Labor	John Doyle (elected 2)	2,336	7.6	
Nationalist	Robert Stopford	3,911	12.7	
Nationalist	Albert Smith (elected 5)	3,016	9.8	
Soldiers & Citizens	Campbell Carmichael (defeated)	2,590	8.4	
Soldiers & Citizens	George Saunders	100	0.3	
Soldiers & Citizens	Charles Shields	28	0.1	
Democratic	Charles Lawlor	2,252	7.3	
Socialist Labor	William Corcoran	81	0.3	
Socialist Labor	James Moroney	59	0.2	
Socialist Labor	Peter Christensen	26	0.1	
Socialist Labor	Herbert Weston	13	0.1	
Independent	Arthur Griffith	165	0.5	
Independent	Henry Levy	93	0.3	
Independent	Solomon Amein	60	0.2	
Independent	George Nielsen	60	0.2	
Total formal votes		30,878	86.4	
Informal votes		4,845	13.6	
Turnout		35,723	54.3	
Party total votes
Labor		18,424	59.7	
Nationalist		6,927	22.4	
Soldiers & Citizens		2,718	8.8	
Democratic		2,252	7.3	
Socialist Labor		179	0.6	
Independent	Arthur Griffith	165	0.5	
Independent	Henry Levy	93	0.3	
Independent	Solomon Amein	60	0.2	
Independent	George Nielsen	60	0.2	

=== Elections in the 1910s ===
==== 1917 ====
This section is an excerpt from Results of the 1917 New South Wales state election § Balmain

1917 New South Wales state election: Balmain
Party	Candidate	Votes	%	±%
Labor	John Storey	3,838	54.3	−3.7
Nationalist	Robert Stopford	3,055	43.2	+13.3
Independent	Michael Moore	161	2.3	+2.3
Independent	John Bell	20	0.3	+0.3
Total formal votes		7,074	99.1	+0.3
Informal votes		62	0.9	−0.3
Turnout		7,136	62.7	−3.5
Labor hold		Swing	−3.7	

==== 1913 ====
This section is an excerpt from Results of the 1913 New South Wales state election § Balmain

1913 New South Wales state election: Balmain
Party	Candidate	Votes	%	±%
Labor	John Storey	4,362	58.0	
Liberal Reform	John McEachern	2,248	29.9	
National Progressive	Francis Lennon	721	9.6	
Australasian Socialist	Patrick Brice	192	2.6	
Total formal votes		7,523	98.8	
Informal votes		93	1.2	
Turnout		7,616	66.2	
Labor hold				

==== 1910 ====
This section is an excerpt from Results of the 1910 New South Wales state election § Balmain

1910 New South Wales state election: Balmain
Party	Candidate	Votes	%	±%
Labour	John Storey	3,927	58.2	
Liberal Reform	John Hurley	2,815	41.8	
Total formal votes		6,742	99.3	
Informal votes		50	0.7	
Turnout		6,792	76.7	
Labour hold				

=== Elections in the 1900s ===
==== 1907 ====
This section is an excerpt from Results of the 1907 New South Wales state election § Balmain

1907 New South Wales state election: Balmain
Party	Candidate	Votes	%	±%
Labour	John Storey	3,100	50.3	+2.8
Liberal Reform	Walter Anderson	3,058	49.7	−2.8
Total formal votes		6,158	98.8	
Informal votes		72	1.2	
Turnout		6,230	76.3	
Labour gain from Liberal Reform		Swing	+2.8	

==== 1904 ====
This section is an excerpt from Results of the 1904 New South Wales state election § Balmain

1904 New South Wales state election: Balmain
Party	Candidate	Votes	%	±%
Liberal Reform	Walter Anderson	2,642	52.5	
Labour	John Storey	2,390	47.5	
Total formal votes		5,032	99.5	
Informal votes		26	0.5	
Turnout		5,058	63.5	
Liberal Reform win		(new seat)		

Balmain consisted of Balmain North and part of Balmain South. John Storey was the member for the abolished seat of Balmain North, while the member for Balmain South was Sydney Law (Independent Labour) who successfully contested Rozelle.

==== 1894–1904 ====
District abolished

==== 1891 ====
This section is an excerpt from Results of the 1891 New South Wales colonial election § Balmain

1891 New South Wales colonial election: Balmain Wednesday 17 June
Party	Candidate	Votes	%	±%
Labour	James Johnston (elected 1)	3,146	13.8	
Labour	William Murphy (elected 2)	2,905	12.8	
Labour	George Clark (elected 3)	2,525	11.1	
Labour	Edward Darnley (elected 4)	2,518	11.1	
Protectionist	Solomon Hyam	2,055	9.0	
Free Trade	John Hawthorne (defeated)	1,820	8.0	
Free Trade	Jacob Garrard (defeated)	1,806	7.9	
Free Trade	George Clubb (defeated)	1,734	7.6	
Free Trade	Frank Smith (defeated)	1,269	5.6	
Protectionist	Angus Mackey	1,080	4.7	
Protectionist	Samuel Davison	737	3.2	
Ind. Free Trade	Robert Cropley	660	2.9	
Protectionist	William Burns	527	2.3	
Total formal votes		22,782	98.5	
Informal votes		339	1.5	
Turnout		6,932	70.8	
Labour gain 4 from Free Trade				

==== 1890 by-election ====
1890 Balmain by-election Thursday 10 July
Party	Candidate	Votes	%	±%
Free Trade	John Hawthorne(re-elected)	unopposed		
Free Trade hold				

John Hawthorne (Free Trade) resigned due to bankruptcy.

=== Elections in the 1880s ===
==== 1889 ====
This section is an excerpt from Results of the 1889 New South Wales colonial election § Balmain

1889 New South Wales colonial election: Balmain Saturday 2 February
Party	Candidate	Votes	%	±%
Free Trade	Jacob Garrard (elected 1)	3,177	15.0	
Free Trade	Frank Smith (elected 2)	3,125	14.7	
Free Trade	George Clubb (elected 3)	3,101	14.6	
Free Trade	John Hawthorne (elected 4)	3,083	14.5	
Protectionist	Solomon Hyam	2,291	10.8	
Protectionist	William Inglis	2,178	10.3	
Protectionist	David Buchanan	2,130	10.0	
Protectionist	William Hutchinson	2,120	10.0	
Total formal votes		21,205	99.6	
Informal votes		87	0.4	
Turnout		5,566	61.0	
Free Trade hold 4				

==== 1887 ====
This section is an excerpt from Results of the 1887 New South Wales colonial election § Balmain

1887 New South Wales colonial election: Balmain Saturday 5 February
Party	Candidate	Votes	%	±%
Free Trade	Jacob Garrard (re-elected 1)	3,012	26.6	
Free Trade	John Hawthorne (re-elected 2)	2,915	25.8	
Free Trade	Frank Smith (elected 3)	2,717	24.0	
Protectionist	Solomon Hyam (defeated)	1,585	14.0	
Protectionist	Thomas Belgrave	723	6.4	
Protectionist	Aaron Wheeler	353	3.1	
Total formal votes		11,305	99.1	
Informal votes		108	1.0	
Turnout		4,640	58.7	

==== 1885 ====
This section is an excerpt from Results of the 1885 New South Wales colonial election § Balmain

1885 New South Wales colonial election: Balmain Friday 16 October
Candidate	Votes	%
Jacob Garrard (re-elected 1)	2,642	27.0
Solomon Hyam (elected 2)	2,323	23.7
John Hawthorne (elected 3)	1,606	16.4
Samuel Davison	1,178	12.0
Maurice Fitzharding	1,131	11.6
Edward Buchanan	908	9.3
Total formal votes	9,788	98.7
Informal votes	126	1.3
Turnout	4,112	60.9
	(1 new seat)	

==== 1882 ====
This section is an excerpt from Results of the 1882 New South Wales colonial election § Balmain

1882 New South Wales colonial election: Balmain Saturday 2 December
Candidate	Votes	%
Jacob Garrard (re-elected 1)	1,514	35.6
William Hutchinson (elected 2)	1,238	29.1
John Taylor	1,166	27.4
William Pritchard	334	7.9
Total formal votes	4,252	98.3
Informal votes	72	1.7
Turnout	2,813	64.6
	(1 new seat)	

==== 1880 ====
This section is an excerpt from Results of the 1880 New South Wales colonial election § Balmain

1880 New South Wales colonial election: Balmain Friday 19 November
Candidate	Votes	%
Jacob Garrard (elected)	789	34.2
John Taylor	777	33.7
Albert Elkington	568	24.6
Charles Mossman	173	7.5
Total formal votes	2,307	96.8
Informal votes	76	3.2
Turnout	2,383	74.0
	(new seat)	

The Sydney Daily Telegraph reported that 60 of the informal votes had written "I Vote for Taylor" on them, where Jacob Garrard won the election by only 12 votes.
