= Electoral results for the district of Rozelle =

Election results for Rozelle, New South Wales, Australia

Rozelle, an electoral district of the Legislative Assembly in the Australian state of New South Wales had two incarnations, from 1904 until 1920 and from 1927 until 1930.

Election	Member	Party
1904	Sydney Law	Liberal Reform
1907	James Mercer	Labour
1910	James Mercer	Labour
1913	James Mercer	Labor / Nationalist
1917	John Quirk	Labor
Election	Member	Party
1927	John Quirk	Labor

== Election results ==
=== Elections in the 1920s ===
==== 1927 ====
1927 New South Wales state election: Rozelle
Party	Candidate	Votes	%	±%
Labor	John Quirk	7,126	53.4	
Nationalist	Albert Smith	4,925	36.9	
Independent Labor	Cecil Murphy (defeated)	1,181	8.9	
Independent	Arthur Doughty	106	0.8	
Total formal votes		13,338	97.9	
Informal votes		283	2.1	
Turnout		13,621	86.1	
Labor win		(new seat)		

District recreated

==== 1920 - 1927 ====
District abolished

=== Elections in the 1910s ===
==== 1917 ====
1917 New South Wales state election: Rozelle
Party	Candidate	Votes	%	±%
Labor	John Quirk	4,204	62.0	−4.1
Nationalist	Alfred Reed	2,576	38.0	+4.1
Total formal votes		6,780	99.0	+0.4
Informal votes		69	1.0	−0.4
Turnout		6,849	60.4	−3.8
Labor hold		Swing	−4.1	

The sitting member was James Mercer (Nationalist) was expelled from Labor in the November 1916 Labor split over conscription, and did not contest the election.

==== 1913 ====
1913 New South Wales state election: Rozelle
Party	Candidate	Votes	%	±%
Labor	James Mercer	4,486	66.1	
Liberal Reform	Alan Chavasse	2,304	33.9	
Total formal votes		6,790	98.6	
Informal votes		99	1.4	
Turnout		6,889	64.2	
Labor hold				

==== 1910 ====
1910 New South Wales state election: Rozelle
Party	Candidate	Votes	%	±%
Labour	James Mercer	4,460	62.5	
Liberal Reform	Tom Hoskins	2,677	37.5	
Total formal votes		7,137	98.7	
Informal votes		98	1.4	
Turnout		7,235	73.3	
Labour hold				

==== 1907 ====
1907 New South Wales state election: Rozelle
Party	Candidate	Votes	%	±%
Labour	James Mercer	3,471	53.2	+4.1
Liberal Reform	Sydney Law	3,056	46.8	−4.1
Total formal votes		6,527	97.9	
Informal votes		143	2.1	
Turnout		6,670	74.4	
Labour gain from Liberal Reform		Swing	+4.1	

==== 1904 ====
1904 New South Wales state election: Rozelle
Party	Candidate	Votes	%	±%
Liberal Reform	Sydney Law	2,542	50.9	
Labour	James Mercer	2,450	49.1	
Total formal votes		4,992	98.9	
Informal votes		55	1.1	
Turnout		5,047	61.8	
Liberal Reform win		(new seat)		

Rozelle was a new seat that consisted of parts of the abolished set of Balmain South and Annandale. The member for Balmain South was Sydney Law who initially won that seat as a Labour candidate, before resigning and winning the seat as an Independent Labour candidate at the 1902 Balmain South by-election and contesting this election as an endorsed Liberal Reform candidate. The member for Annandale was William Mahony (Liberal Reform) who successfully contested that seat.
