= 1939 Balmain state by-election =

Election result for Balmain, New South Wales, Australia

A by-election was held for the New South Wales Legislative Assembly electorate of Balmain on 14 January 1939 following the death of John Quirk (Labor). His widow Mary Quirk won the by-election.

== Results ==
1939 Balmain by-election Saturday 14 January
Party	Candidate	Votes	%	±%
Labor	Mary Quirk	7,656	51.21	
Independent Labor	Sidney Weston	4,336	29.01	
Independent Labor	John O'Carroll	2,957	19.78	
Total formal votes		14,949	95.09	
Informal votes		772	4.91	
Turnout		15,721	90.12	
Labor hold		Swing		

== See also ==
- Electoral results for the district of Balmain
- List of New South Wales state by-elections
