= 1890 Balmain colonial by-election =

By-election in New South Wales, Australia

A by-election was held for the New South Wales Legislative Assembly electorate of Balmain on 10 July 1890 because John Hawthorne (Free Trade) resigned due to bankruptcy.

== Dates ==
Date	Event
26 June 1890	John Hawthorne made bankrupt, and resigned.
27 June 1890	Writ of election issued by the Speaker of the Legislative Assembly.
10 July 1890	Nominations
12 July 1890	Polling day
19 July 1890	Return of writ

== Result ==
1890 Balmain by-election]] Thursday 10 July
Party	Candidate	Votes	%	±%
Free Trade	John Hawthorne(re-elected)	unopposed		
Free Trade hold				

== See also ==
- Electoral results for the district of Balmain
- List of New South Wales state by-elections
