= Freya Leach =

Australian conservative political commentator

- Born: 17 November 2002 (age 24); Sydney, Australia
- Education: University of Sydney (dropped out)
- Occupations: Television presenter; political commentator; media personality
- Spouse: Cooper Gannon

Freya Leach (born 17 November 2002) is an Australian political commentator and media personality. She was a TV presenter on Sky News Australia, where she co-hosted The Late Debate from 2025 to 2026. Her solo show, Freya Fires Up, was cancelled in September 2025, six weeks after it began. Her views have been described as conservative and right wing.

== Early life and education ==
Freya Leach was born in Sydney, Australia, the daughter of Pastor Mark Leach. She graduated dux at St Andrew's Cathedral School in Sydney. Leach's paternal grandmother survived The Holocaust.

Leach was studying a Bachelor of Commerce and a Bachelor of Laws at the University of Sydney, but dropped out to accept a position at Sky News Australia. She was a Policy Development Officer at the Sydney University Liberal Club and the NSW Young Liberals.

In 2022, she was the subject of national media coverage after complaining to Sydney Law School about an assignment involving a right-wing fictional character by the name of 'Freya' that kills a left-wing victim in a hit-and-run, has unprotected sex despite being HIV-positive and is thrown out of a window. Leach alleged that the professor who set the assignment was targeting her because of her political views, while the university claimed the identical names and political beliefs were a coincidence. The University of Sydney later removed the exam after continued criticism.

== Career ==
=== Political career ===
Leach was the New South Wales Liberal Party's candidate for the seat of Balmain in the 2023 New South Wales state election, losing to Kobi Shetty of the Australian Greens.

The Menzies Research Centre, a centre-right public policy think tank aligned with the Liberal Party, named Leach the director of the Centre for Youth Policy in 2023.

=== Media career ===
Leach dropped out of the University of Sydney and accepted a position as an on-air host at Sky News Australia in July 2025, appearing on The Late Debate nightly.

Her own show, Freya Fires Up, premiered in August 2025, featuring guests with differing political views. It was cancelled by Sky News six weeks later after guest Ryan Williams made anti-Islam remarks and wore bacon on his shirt during a live broadcast. Leach remained a host on The Late Debate until 2026.

In January 2026, Leach announced via social media that she was leaving The Late Debate. Leach went onto announce she would host a program on the John Anderson Media YouTube channel, run by former Australian deputy prime minister John Anderson.
