= Freya Fires Up =

Australian television program

- Presented by: Freya Leach
- Country of origin: Australia
- No. of seasons: 1
- No. of episodes: 6

Production
- Producer: Ben Espiner

Original release
- Network: Sky News Australia
- Release: 17 August – 21 September 2025

Freya Fires Up was an Australian television current affairs and commentary program, shown on Sky News Australia and hosted by conservative political commentator Freya Leach. The program, which was broadcast on Sunday nights, began in August 2025 and was cancelled six weeks later in September 2025.

== History ==
Freya Leach, a conservative political commentator and former Liberal Party candidate, joined Sky News Australia in 2025 as a co-host of The Late Debate. On 6 August 2025, she was announced as the host of her own program, Freya Fires Up, which debuted two weeks later on 17 August 2025. One of the program's inaugural guests was socialist activist Jordan van den Lamb.

=== Cancellation ===
Ryan Williams (left) wearing bacon on his chest while being introduced by Freya Leach on 21 September 2025

On 21 September 2025, Leach hosted a panel on the program with Scottish Asian social media personality Ryan Williams (also known online as thescottishkorean) and American political strategist Joey Mannarino. After being asked by Leach about his reaction to the assassination of Charlie Kirk, Williams made multiple anti-Islam remarks while wearing raw rashers of bacon across his chest. Leach responded by saying there were "great moderate Muslims" in Australia, and briefly apologised for Williams' comments moments later, before continuing the remainder of the interview with Mannarino alone. The comments were not republished by Sky News, but Williams posted the segment on his own social media accounts.

The following day, Sky News initiated a review into the program, describing Williams' comments as "wholly inappropriate and unacceptable". A full apology was also issued by Leach in a pre-recorded statement during The Late Debate later in the evening. Following the review, Sky News chose to pre-record future episodes of Freya Fires Up instead of continuing to broadcast the program live. Ben Espiner, the program's producer, was sacked on 25 September 2025.

Although Freya Fires Up was expected to continue, the program did not air on 28 September 2025 and was replaced with a rerun of Sunday Agenda. The following day, Sky News confirmed the program had been cancelled after six episodes, and Leach continued at the channel as a co-host of The Late Debate before leaving the show in January 2026.
