= Electoral district of Rozelle =

Former state electoral district of New South Wales, Australia

Rozelle was an electoral district of the Legislative Assembly in the Australian state of New South Wales, it was named after and including the Sydney suburb of Rozelle. It was created in the 1904 re-distribution of electorates following the 1903 New South Wales referendum, which required the number of members of the Legislative Assembly to be reduced from 125 to 90. It consisted of part of the abolished seat of Balmain South and part of Annandale. With the introduction of proportional representation, it was absorbed into the multi-member electorate of Balmain. It was recreated in 1927, but was abolished in 1930.

== Members for Rozelle ==
First incarnation (1904–1920)
Member	Party	Term
Sydney Law	Liberal Reform	1904–1907
James Mercer	Labor	1907–1916
James Mercer	Nationalist	1916–1917
John Quirk	Labor	1917–1920
Second incarnation (1927–1930)
Member	Party	Term
John Quirk	Labor	1927–1930

== Election results ==
1927 New South Wales state election: Rozelle
Party	Candidate	Votes	%	±%
Labor	John Quirk	7,126	53.4	
Nationalist	Albert Smith	4,925	36.9	
Independent Labor	Cecil Murphy (defeated)	1,181	8.9	
Independent	Arthur Doughty	106	0.8	
Total formal votes		13,338	97.9	
Informal votes		283	2.1	
Turnout		13,621	86.1	
Labor win		(new seat)		
