= Robert Stopford (politician) =

English-born Australian politician (1862 – 1926)

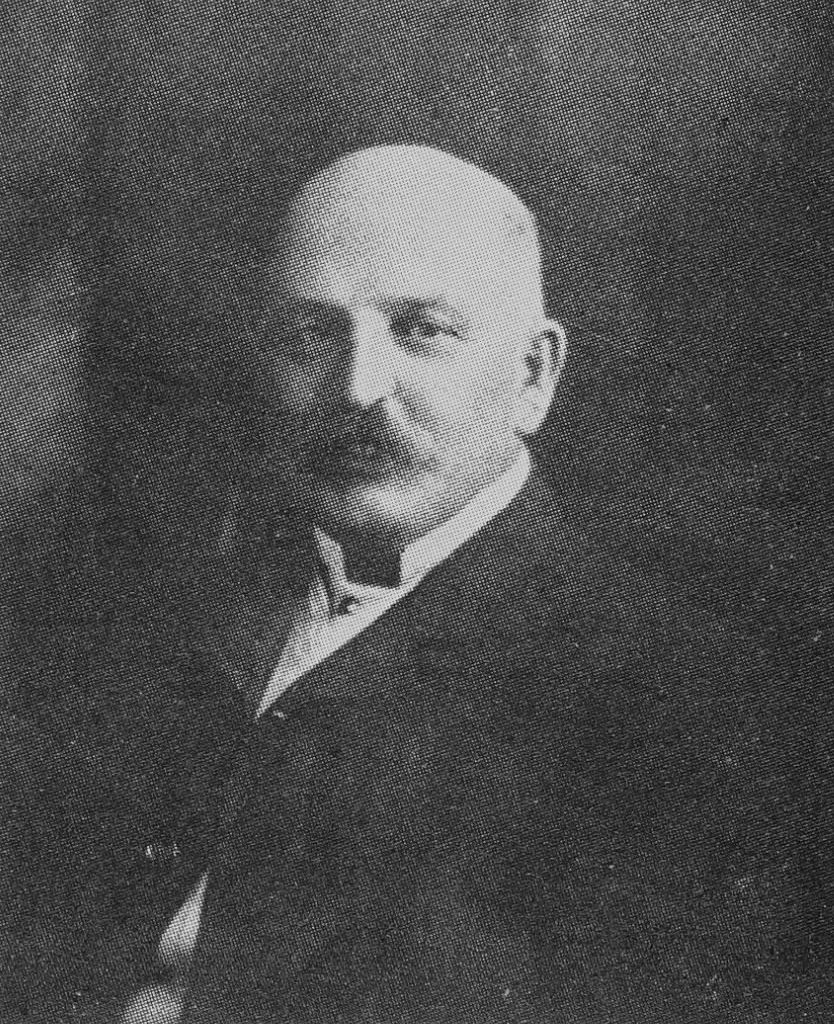
Stopford in 1909

Robert Stopford (12 February 1862 – 28 January 1926) was an English-born Australian politician.

He is the great-great-grandfather of comedian and actress Rebel Wilson.

== Biography ==
He was born at Upholland in Lancashire, to property owner John Stopford and Jane Elizabeth, née Yates. He attended University College, Liverpool, and became a medical practitioner, working in Ireland and Southport before travelling to New Zealand in 1902 and settling in Wellington. Stopford had been a supporter of the Liberal Party in England but joined the Independent Political Labour League (forerunner to the present day New Zealand Labour Party) whilst living there. Stopford also became involved in the Plunket Society, an infant welfare movement founded by Truby King. In 1905 he moved to Auckland accepting a job running the local hydropath institute. Whilst there he was also elected a member of the Auckland City Council in 1907. Stopford was the only successful candidate from the Labour ticket and became the first ever Labour candidate elected to the city council. He thought of politics as a means of advancing child welfare.

In 1911 he arrived in Sydney and settled in Balmain, where he ran a children's clinic. Just as in New Zealand he supported the Labor Party in Australia until 1917, when he joined the Nationalist Party over the issue of conscription. From 1922 to 1925 he served as a Nationalist member of the New South Wales Legislative Assembly for Balmain. Stopford died in Balmain in 1926.

New South Wales Legislative Assembly
Preceded by John Doyle; John Storey; Albert Smith; John Quirk; Stuart-Robertson	Member for Balmain; 1922–1925; With: Tom Keegan; Albert Lane; John Quirk; Robert Stuart-Robertson	Succeeded by H. V. Evatt; Tom Keegan; Albert Lane; John Quirk; Robert Stuart-Robertson
