= Thomas Hoare =

Thomas Hoare or Hore may refer to:

- Thomas Hoare (mercenary), known as Mike
- Thomas Hore, MP
- Thomas Hoare, one of the Candidates of the New South Wales state election, 1922
