= John Doyle (Australian politician) =

Australian politician

John William Doyle (8 February 1875 – 25 May 1951) was an Australian politician

He was born in Glebe to labourer John William Doyle and Annie, née Wilson. A printer, he was a foundation member of the Machinists' Union in 1901 as its secretary. He married Mary Smith on 3 October 1906, with whom he had seven children. He became a publican and an organising secretary of the Eight Hour Day Committee from around 1912 to 1917. In 1917 he was elected to the New South Wales Legislative Assembly as the Labor member for Phillip, moving to the multi-member seat of Balmain in 1920 before being defeated in 1922. He was also a Sydney City Councillor from 1918 to 1921. Doyle died in Darlinghurst in 1951.

New South Wales Legislative Assembly
| Preceded by Richard Meagher | Member for Phillip; 1917–1920 | Abolished |
| Preceded by John Storey | Member for Balmain; 1920–1922; Served alongside: Quirk, Smith, Storey/Keegan, Stuart-Robertson | Succeeded by Albert Lane; Robert Stopford |
