= Roger Degen =

Australian politician

Roger Charles Degen (born 1 May 1939) is a former Australian politician. He was the Labor member for Balmain in the New South Wales Legislative Assembly from 1968 to 1984.

Degen was born in Balmain to boatbuilder John Degen and Alice Quigley. He was educated at St Joseph's Christian Brothers High School in Rozelle before being apprenticed to the Railways Department building carriages and wagons. A carpenter, he became an executive member of the New South Wales Building Workers' Industrial Union; he joined the Labor Party in 1962. He became assistant secretary of the party's Rozelle branch, and was on the electorate councils for the federal seat of Dalley and the state seat of Balmain. He married Celes Watkin in 1964, with whom he had one son.

When the member for Balmain, John McMahon, retired at the 1968 state election, Degen was selected to replace him as Labor candidate. He won the seat easily. In 1980, he faced a motion of expulsion from parliament after an adverse finding against him by the Woodward Royal Commission into drug trafficking. The motion was defeated on party lines and he continued to hold the seat without difficulty until his retirement in 1984.

New South Wales Legislative Assembly
Preceded by John McMahon	Member for Balmain; 1968–1984	Succeeded by Peter Crawford
