= H. V. Evatt =

Australian politician (1894–1965)

The Right Honourable H. V. Evatt QC, FRAHS
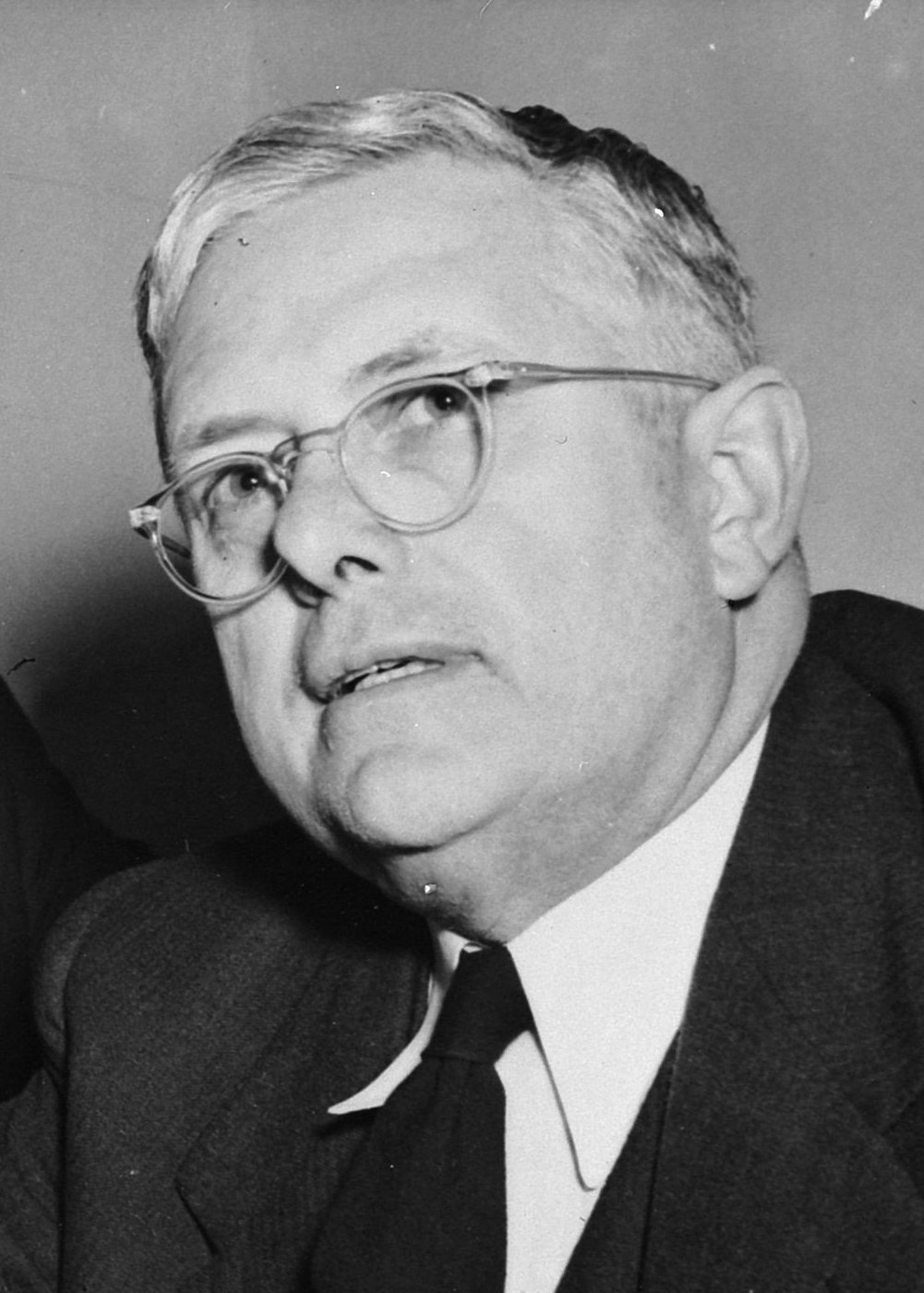
- Evatt in 1948

Justice of the High Court of Australia
- In office 19 December 1930 – 2 September 1940
- Nominated by: James Scullin
- Preceded by: Sir Charles Powers
- Succeeded by: Sir Dudley Williams

Chief Justice of New South Wales
- In office 15 February 1960 – 24 October 1962
- Preceded by: Sir Kenneth Street
- Succeeded by: Sir Leslie Herron

Leader of the Opposition
- In office 20 June 1951 – 9 February 1960
- Prime Minister: Robert Menzies
- Deputy: Arthur Calwell
- Preceded by: Ben Chifley
- Succeeded by: Arthur Calwell

Leader of the Labor Party
- In office 20 June 1951 – 9 February 1960
- Deputy: Arthur Calwell
- Preceded by: Ben Chifley
- Succeeded by: Arthur Calwell

Deputy Leader of the Labor Party
- In office 31 October 1946 – 20 June 1951
- Leader: Ben Chifley
- Preceded by: Frank Forde
- Succeeded by: Arthur Calwell

Attorney-General of Australia
- In office 7 October 1941 – 19 December 1949
- Prime Minister: John Curtin; Frank Forde; Ben Chifley
- Preceded by: Billy Hughes
- Succeeded by: John Spicer

Minister for External Affairs
- In office 7 October 1941 – 19 December 1949
- Prime Minister: John Curtin; Frank Forde; Ben Chifley
- Preceded by: Sir Frederick Stewart
- Succeeded by: Percy Spender

President of the United Nations General Assembly
- In office 1948–1949
- Preceded by: José Arce
- Succeeded by: Carlos P. Romulo

Member of the Australian Parliament for Barton
- In office 21 September 1940 – 22 November 1958
- Preceded by: Albert Lane
- Succeeded by: Len Reynolds

Member of the Australian Parliament for Hunter
- In office 22 November 1958 – 10 February 1960
- Preceded by: Rowley James
- Succeeded by: Bert James

Personal details
- Born: Herbert Vere Evatt; 30 April 1894 East Maitland, Colony of New South Wales, British Empire
- Died: 2 November 1965 (aged 71) Forrest, Australian Capital Territory, Australia
- Party: Labor
- Spouse: Mary Alice Sheffer (m. 1920)
- Children: 2, including Peter
- Relatives: Clive Evatt (brother); Elizabeth Evatt (niece); Penelope Seidler (niece); Sir George Evatt (uncle)
- Education: Fort Street Model School; University of Sydney (BA, MA, LLB, LLD)
- Occupation: Lawyer; academic; politician; judge

Herbert Vere "Doc" Evatt (30 April 1894 – 2 November 1965) was an Australian politician and judge. He served as a justice of the High Court of Australia from 1930 to 1940, Attorney-General and Minister for External Affairs from 1941 to 1949, and leader of the Australian Labor Party (ALP) and Leader of the Opposition from 1951 to 1960. Evatt is considered one of Australia's most prominent public intellectuals of the twentieth century.

Evatt was born in East Maitland, New South Wales, and grew up on Sydney's North Shore. He studied law at the University of Sydney, attaining the degree of Doctor of Laws (LL.D.) in 1924. After a period in the New South Wales Legislative Assembly (1925–1930), Evatt was appointed to the High Court in 1930 by the Scullin government. He was 36 years old, and remains the youngest appointee in the court's history. He was considered an innovative judge, but left the court to seek election to federal parliament at the 1940 federal election.

In 1941, the ALP returned to government under Prime Minister John Curtin. Evatt was appointed Attorney-General and Minister for External Affairs, positions he held under Curtin and Ben Chifley until the government's defeat at the 1949 federal election. He served as President of the United Nations General Assembly from 1948 to 1949, and helped to draft the Universal Declaration of Human Rights. After Chifley's death in 1951, Evatt was elected as his successor as ALP leader. Internal tensions over the party's attitude to communism during the Cold War culminated in a party split in 1955. The ALP was defeated at three consecutive federal elections under Evatt's leadership, in 1954, 1955 and 1958. He faced three leadership spills before being convinced to retire from politics in 1960 and accept the post of Chief Justice of New South Wales.

== Early life and education ==
Evatt was born on 30 April 1894 at the Bank Hotel in East Maitland, New South Wales. He was the fifth of eight sons born to Jane Sophia (known as "Jeanie") and John Ashmore Hamilton Evatt; two of his older brothers died in infancy. On his father's side, Evatt was descended from an Anglo-Irish family with a history of military service – his paternal grandfather was Captain George Evatt of the 70th (Surrey) Regiment of Foot, while an uncle was Major-General Sir George Evatt. His father was born in Cawnpore (now Kanpur), India, but grew up in Dublin, Ireland. He arrived in Australia at the age of 16, and eventually settled in Morpeth, where in 1882 he married Jeanie Gray, the daughter of a marine engineer from Sydney. Evatt's maternal grandfather was born in Shoreditch, London, England, while his maternal grandmother was born in County Limerick, Ireland. His parents – both Anglicans – moved to East Maitland in 1885, where they managed the Hunter River Hotel until 1891 and then took over the smaller Bank Hotel.

Evatt began his education at a local state school. His father suffered a protracted bout of ill health and died in October 1901, when his son was seven. The family stayed in Maitland for three more years, but eventually moved to Sydney to be closer to his mother's family, who lived on the North Shore. She bought a home in Milsons Point overlooking Sydney Harbour, within walking distance of her parents' home in Kirribilli. The house was later demolished to make way for the Sydney Harbour Bridge. Evatt was enrolled in the Fort Street Model School, located directly across the harbour on Observatory Hill. He attended the school from 1905 to 1911, in his final year serving as head prefect and captain of the cricket and rugby union teams. He finished second in the state senior examinations, and was dux of his school.

In 1912, Evatt began studying at the University of Sydney, where he was a resident of St Andrew's College. He graduated in 1915 with a BA degree with first-class honours in English, Mathematics, and Philosophy, and received the University Medal. Evatt subsequently obtained an MA degree in 1917, and an LLB with first-class honours and again the University Medal in 1918 from the same university. At university, Evatt played cricket, rugby league football, hockey and baseball. He was also the Editor of Hermes, the annual student literary journal, was a Tutor at St Andrew's College, and the President of the University of Sydney Union from 1916 to 1917. With his thesis "Certain aspects of the royal prerogative", he was awarded an LLD degree from the University of Sydney in 1924. Evatt remained involved with the University after his graduation, and was chief organiser in the formation of University's Rugby League club which over 1920 to 1937 competed in what is now the National Rugby League.

== State politics ==
Due to poor eyesight, Evatt was unable to serve in the First World War, in which two of his brothers were killed. He became a prominent industrial lawyer in Sydney, working mainly for trade union clients. In 1925 Evatt was elected as an Australian Labor Party member for Balmain in the New South Wales Legislative Assembly. Re-elected as an "Independent Labor" candidate in 1927, Evatt served in the Legislative Assembly until 1930.

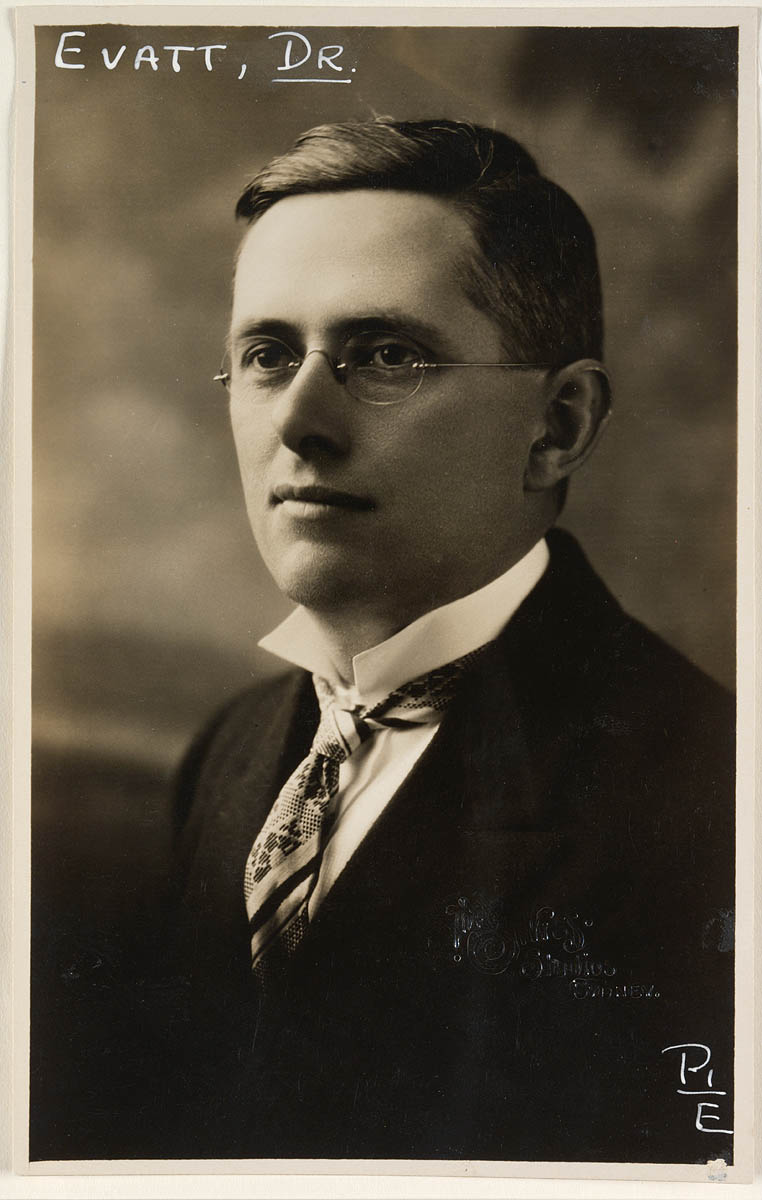
Evatt in 1925

== High Court (1930–1940) ==
In 1930 the Labor government headed by James Scullin appointed Evatt as the youngest-ever justice of the High Court of Australia. Regarded by some as a brilliant and innovative judge, he delivered a number of minority judgments, several of which were adopted by High Court majorities decades later. Evatt could, however, be partial on the bench. Sir Owen Dixon noted in Australian Woollen Mills Ltd v F.S. Walton & Co. Ltd (1937 58 CLR 641) that Evatt was on that occasion "full of antagonism to the respondent ... Most unjudicial." Whenever Evatt was not particularly interested in a case he appears to have generally gone along with Dixon.

Evatt was one of six justices of the High Court who had served in the Parliament of New South Wales, along with Edmund Barton, Richard O'Connor, Adrian Knox, Albert Piddington and Edward McTiernan. In 1934 Evatt played an important part in the Egon Kisch exclusion when he ruled that the Lyons government's ban on Kisch entering Australia had been incorrectly executed and that Kisch was free to enter the country.

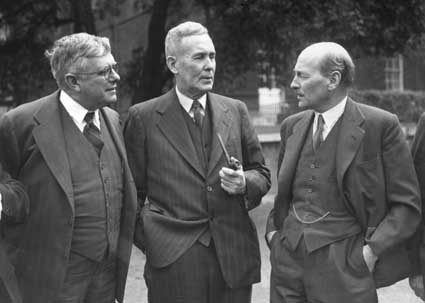
Evatt (left) and Ben Chifley (middle) with Clement Attlee (right) at the Dominion and British Leaders Conference, London, 1946

== Federal politics ==
In 1940, Evatt resigned from the High Court to return to politics, and was elected federal MP for the Sydney seat of Barton in the House of Representatives.. When Labor came to power under John Curtin in 1941, Evatt became Attorney-General and Foreign Minister. While serving in the British War Cabinet (1941 - 1946), Evatt was appointed a Member of the Privy Councillor in 1942; he then was also honored as an honorary Master of the Bench at the Middle Temple. He became deputy leader of the Labor Party and de facto Deputy Prime Minister after the 1946 election, under the leadership of Ben Chifley.

While in London, Evatt acted as the spokesperson for the Australian Board of Control for International Cricket and made personal representations to the Marylebone Cricket Club who were reluctant to send a cricket team to tour Australia so soon after the war. He put forward convincing arguments as to the need to re-establish sporting relations and the financial benefits of the tour and the MCC agreed to the 1946–47 Ashes series. Don Bradman would later aver that the "quick resumption of Anglo-Australian Tests had justified itself in every way, psychologically, technically, financially".

Evatt was a defender of the White Australia Policy. There was a strong view in Australia that any softening of the White Australia stance might result in cheaper labour being imported from overseas. Another prevailing sentiment was that multiculturalism resulted in instability. Evatt, opposing resolutions which could have led to more Asian immigration to Australia, told the Chinese delegation at San Francisco:

You have always insisted on the right to determine the composition of your own people. Australia wants that right now. What you are attempting to do now, Japan attempted after the last war [the First World War] and was prevented by Australia. Had we opened New Guinea and Australia to Japanese immigration then the Pacific War by now might have ended disastrously and we might have had another shambles like that experienced in Malaya.

=== President of the UN General Assembly ===
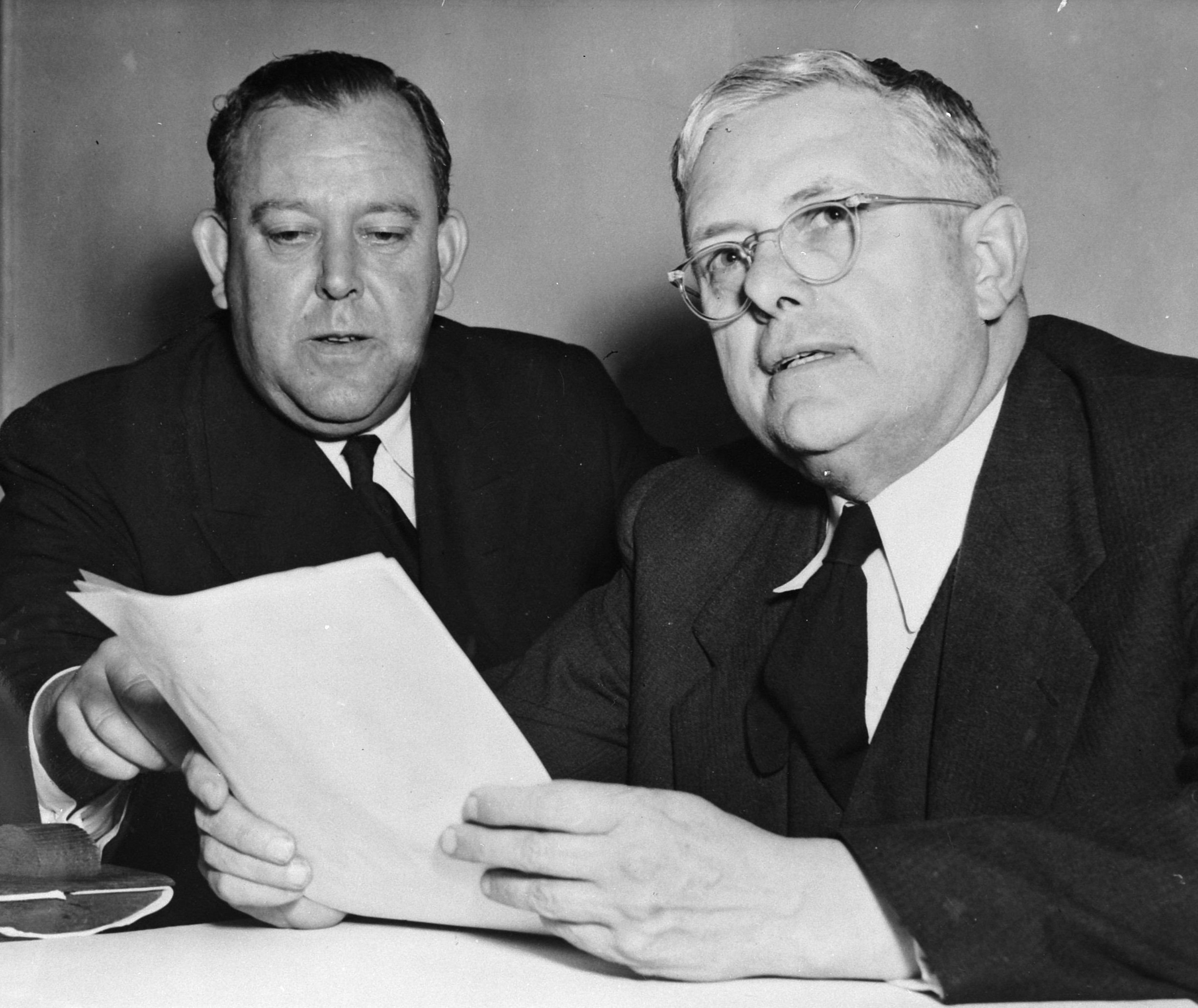
Evatt in 1948 with UN Secretary-General Trygve Lie

Evatt joined the diplomatic councils of the allies during World War II. In 1945, he played a leading role in the founding of the UN. He was President of the United Nations General Assembly from 1948 to 1949 as part of the third session of the United Nations General Assembly, and was prominent in the negotiations that led to the creation of Israel as chair of the Ad Hoc Committee on the Palestinian Question. He helped draft the United Nations Universal Declaration of Human Rights.

=== Leader of the Opposition (1951–1960) ===
In the 1949 election, Labor was defeated by Menzies' new Liberal Party. At this election, Evatt faced war hero Nancy Wake and suffered a massive swing in his own electorate, seeing his majority reduced from a very safe 66.9 percent to an extremely marginal 53.2 percent. He faced Wake again in the double dissolution election of 1951 and was nearly defeated, seeing her off by only 243 votes (out of more than 41,600 cast). When Ben Chifley (still Labor leader) suddenly died several months later, Evatt was elected unopposed as his successor. At first his leadership went well. He campaigned successfully against Menzies' attempt to amend the Constitution to ban the Communist Party. Many convinced anti-Communists in the Labor Party believed this was both bad politics and bad policy because of the active Communist infiltration of numerous trade unions, and because of the threat to national security posed by Communism. None of the anti-Communists, aside from Stan Keon, openly censured Evatt's stance.

Evatt campaigned well in the 1954 election and came within four seats of defeating the Menzies government. The Labor Party actually achieved a higher two-party-preferred vote in the election than the governing Liberal-Country Coalition, but the uneven distribution of votes meant that the Coalition retained more seats and were able to hold onto government. Evatt believed that the Petrov Affair, involving the defection of a Soviet diplomat and his wife during the election campaign, had been contrived through Menzies's conspiring with security services with the specific purpose of discrediting Evatt. In the ensuing Royal Commission on Espionage, documents tendered were alleged to provide evidence of an extensive Soviet spy ring in Australia, and named (among many others), two of Evatt's staff members. Evatt appeared before the Royal Commission as attorney for his staff members. His cross-examination of the key ASIO operative Michael Bialoguski transformed the commission's hearings and greatly perturbed the government. The Royal Commission quickly withdrew Evatt's leave to appear. Evatt claimed this denial was because of judicial bias in favour of the Menzies government.

Evatt's loss of the election and his belief that Menzies had conspired with ASIO to contrive Petrov's defection led to criticism within the Labor Party of his decision to appear before the Royal Commission. He compounded this by writing to the Soviet Foreign Minister, Vyacheslav Molotov, asking if allegations of Soviet espionage in Australia were true. When Molotov replied, naturally denying the allegations, Evatt read the letter out in Parliament, bringing the House into silence momentarily before both sides of Parliament began laughing.

Evatt also blamed the Catholic-dominated "Groupers" in the Labor Party for sabotaging his election campaign. He later publicly attacked The Groupers, who had infiltrated the Victorian Labor Party, thus precipitating a split in the party, with most of the "Groupers" leaving or being expelled. The disaffected formed the Democratic Labor Party, which directed its preferences against Labor at subsequent elections. This, together with an obsessive hatred of Menzies, led Evatt into a number of unforced errors. Due to these factors, Labor was roundly defeated in the 1955 election, suffering an 11-seat swing. Evatt himself was nearly defeated in Barton after almost three-quarters of independents' preferences flowed to his Liberal opponent. For the 1958 election, he transferred to Hunter, one of the few safe country seats for Labor. He offered to resign as leader if the DLP would return to the party. The offer was rejected and Labor was soundly defeated again.

== Chief Justice of New South Wales (1960–1962) ==
In 1960, the Labor government in New South Wales appointed Evatt the Chief Justice of New South Wales, an appointment that was widely seen as a means of giving him a dignified exit from politics.

=== Health ===
Recent biographies of Evatt agree that his behaviour became more eccentric from the late 1950s. Pat Fiske and David McKnight, in their 1995 television documentary Doc, attributed what they described as Evatt's "deteriorating mental functioning" to arteriosclerosis.

In 1962, Evatt was suffering from stress and was persuaded to retire from the bench. He died from pneumonia in Canberra on 2 November 1965, aged 71.

== Personal life ==
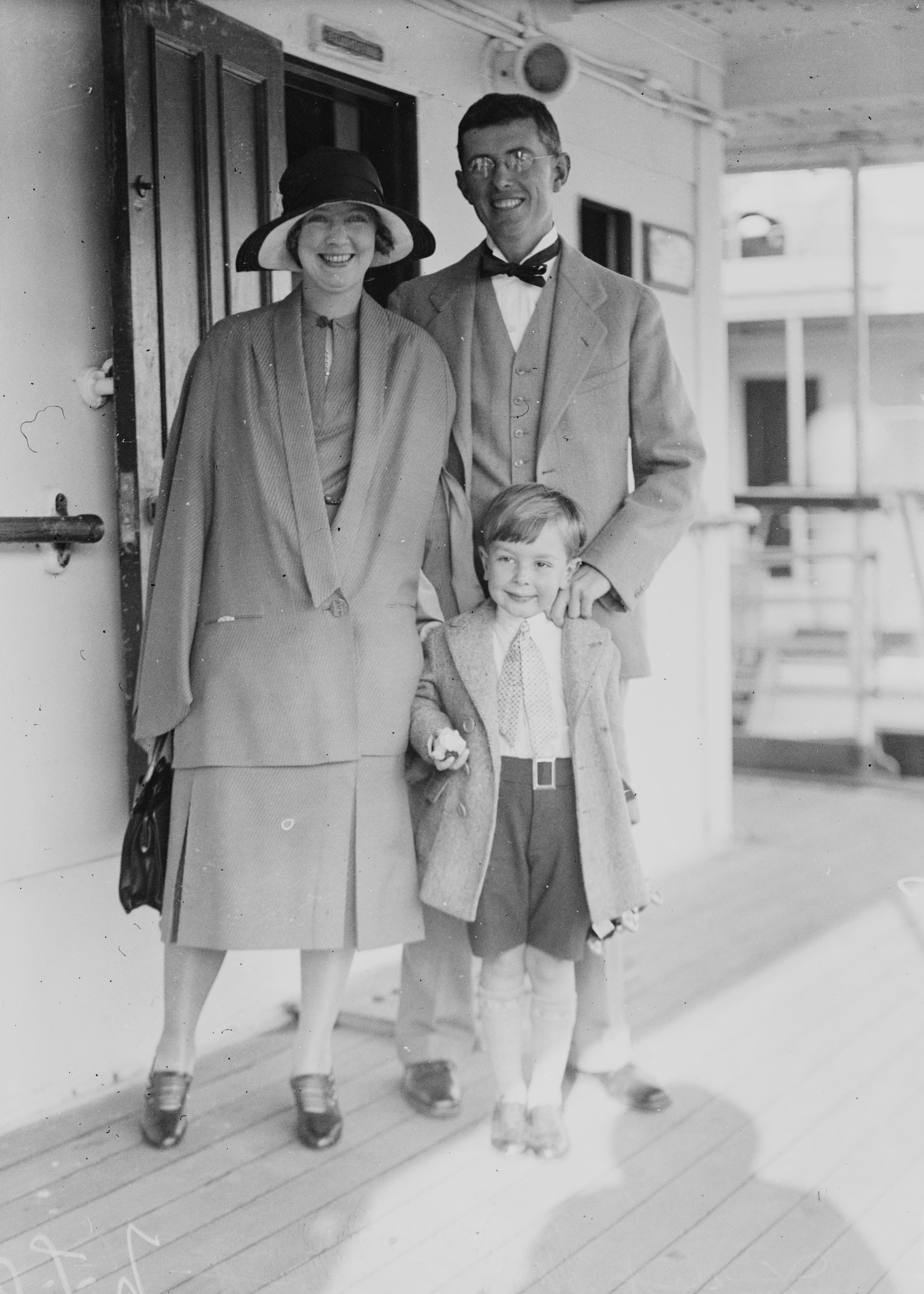
Evatt in 1926 with his wife Mary and son Peter

Two years after being admitted to the New South Wales Bar, Evatt, an Anglican, married Mary Alice Sheffer at the Congregational Church in Mosman, New South Wales on 27 November 1920. Even with his sometimes turbulent nature, the relationship was one of devotion. The couple had two children, Peter and Rosalind, whom they adopted due to Mary Alice's serious gynaecological issues.

Peter Evatt became an Olympic rower, who was 1953 national sculling champion and represented Australia in rowing at the 1956 Olympic Games in Melbourne. Peter was a member of the ALP, like his father, and stood for the seat of Bennelong at the 1969 federal election.

In 1972, aged 50, Peter died by accidental electrocution while trying to repair a faulty electric toaster. He was survived by his six children. His death was reported by The Age on 27 December 1972.

In 1953, Rosalind Evatt married Peter Carrodus, the assistant manager of a Canberra radio station, 2CA.

=== Relatives ===
Evatt's youngest brother was Clive R. Evatt, whose three children are noted below:

- Evatt's niece, Penelope Seidler, an architect, married Harry Seidler in 1958.
- Evatt's niece, Elizabeth Evatt, was a barrister and judge.
- Evatt's nephew, Clive A. Evatt, was a defamation barrister.

Evatt's great-great-niece is Brooke Patterson, a councillor on the City of Gold Coast.

== Literary works ==
During his life, Evatt had a varied career as a writer, covering such topics as law and labour history. His book on the politics of the Rum Rebellion is still considered relevant, although others disagree with Evatt's view. Evatt contributed an article on "Cricket and the British Commonwealth" to the 1949 edition of the Wisden Cricketer's Almanack.

His publications include:

- H. V. Evatt, Australian Labour Leader: The Story Of W.A. Holman and the Labour Movement, 1954
- H. V. Evatt, The King and His Dominion Governors, 1936
- H. V. Evatt, Injustice within the Law. A study of the case of the Dorsetshire Labourers, 1937
- H. V. Evatt, The Royal Prerogative, 1930 (this was his LLD thesis)
- H. V. Evatt, Rum Rebellion: A Study of the Overthrow of Governor Bligh by John Macarthur and the New South Wales Corps, 1943
- H. V. Evatt, Liberalism in Australia: An Historical Sketch of Australian Politics down to the year 1915, 1918

== Honours ==
- In 1929, Evatt was appointed a Member of the King’s Counsel (KC; later Queen’s Counsel, i.e. QC).
- Evatt was nominated for the Nobel Peace Prize in 1950 and 1953, but was not selected in both instances.
- He was elected a Fellow of the Royal Australian Historical Society (FRAHS) in 1943.
- In 1962, he was appointed a Knight of Justice of the Order of Saint John of Jerusalem (KStJ).

== Recognition ==
- The Evatt Foundation, a research institute for the labour movement, is named in his honour.
- The suburb of Evatt, which lies in the Belconnen district of Canberra, Australian Capital Territory, is also named after him.
- One of the high schools (Maitland Boys High School) in his home town of Maitland was briefly renamed Evatt High School in his honour, before being renamed Maitland High School when it became unisex some years later.
- In November 1965, the NSW State Government opened Evatt Park in Lugarno, which is still used frequently for recreation.
- United Nations Youth Australia runs an annual national high schools Model United Nations Security Council competition, the Evatt Cup, which has rounds in every state and territory.

== Bibliography ==
- Wake, Valdemar Robert (2004). No Ribbons or Medals: The story of 'Hereward', an Australian counter espionage officer. Mitcham, South Australia, Australia: Jacobyte Books. ISBN 1-74100-165-X.ISBN 9781741001655 available from Digital Print, South Australia.

=== Further reading ===
- Buckley, Ken; Dale, Barbara and Reynolds, Wayne. Doc Evatt, Cheshire, Melbourne (1994); ISBN 0-582-87498-X
- Dalziel, Allan. Evatt. The Enigma, Lansdowne Press, Melbourne (1967).
- Haigh, Gideon. The Brilliant Boy: Doc Evatt and the Great Australian Dissent, Simon and Schuster, Sydney (2021); ISBN 9781760856113
- Hogan, Ashley. Moving in the Open Daylight: Doc Evatt, an Australian at the United Nations, Sydney University Press: Sydney, (2008); ISBN 9781920899288
- Makin, Norman. Federal Labour Leaders, Union Printing, Sydney, New South Wales (1961), pp. 140–145.
- Murphy, John. Evatt: A Life, NewSouth Publishing, Sydney (2016) ISBN 9781742234465
- Renouf, Alan. Let Justice Be Done. The Foreign Policy of Dr H.V. Evatt, University of Queensland Press, St Lucia, Queensland (1983); ISBN 0-7022-1893-6
- Tennant, Kylie. Evatt. Politics and Justice, Angus and Robertson, Sydney (1970); ISBN 0-207-12533-3

New South Wales Legislative Assembly
| Preceded by Robert Stopford | Member for Balmain; 1925–1927; Served alongside: Keegan, Lane, Quirk, Stuart-Robertson | Succeeded by Himself |
| Preceded by Himself, Keegan, Lane, Quirk, Stuart-Robertson | Member for Balmain; 1927–1930 | Succeeded by John Quirk |
Parliament of Australia
| Preceded by Albert Lane | Member for Barton; 1940–1958 | Succeeded by Len Reynolds |
| Preceded by Rowley James | Member for Hunter; 1958–1960 | Succeeded by Bert James |
Political offices
| Preceded by Sir Frederick Stewart | Minister for External Affairs; 1941–1949 | Succeeded by Percy Spender |
| Preceded by Billy Hughes | Attorney-General of Australia; 1941–1949 | Succeeded by John Spicer |
| Preceded by Ben Chifley | Leader of the Opposition of Australia; 1951–1960 | Succeeded by Arthur Calwell |
Party political offices
| Preceded by Frank Forde | Deputy Leader of the Australian Labor Party; 1946–1951 | Succeeded by Arthur Calwell |
| Preceded by Ben Chifley | Leader of the Australian Labor Party; 1951–1960 | Succeeded by Arthur Calwell |
Diplomatic posts
| Preceded by José Arce | President of the United Nations General Assembly; 1948–1949 | Succeeded by Carlos P. Romulo |
Legal offices
| Preceded by Sir Kenneth Street | Chief Justice of New South Wales; 1960–1962 | Succeeded by Sir Leslie Herron |
