= Albert Lane (politician) =

Australian politician

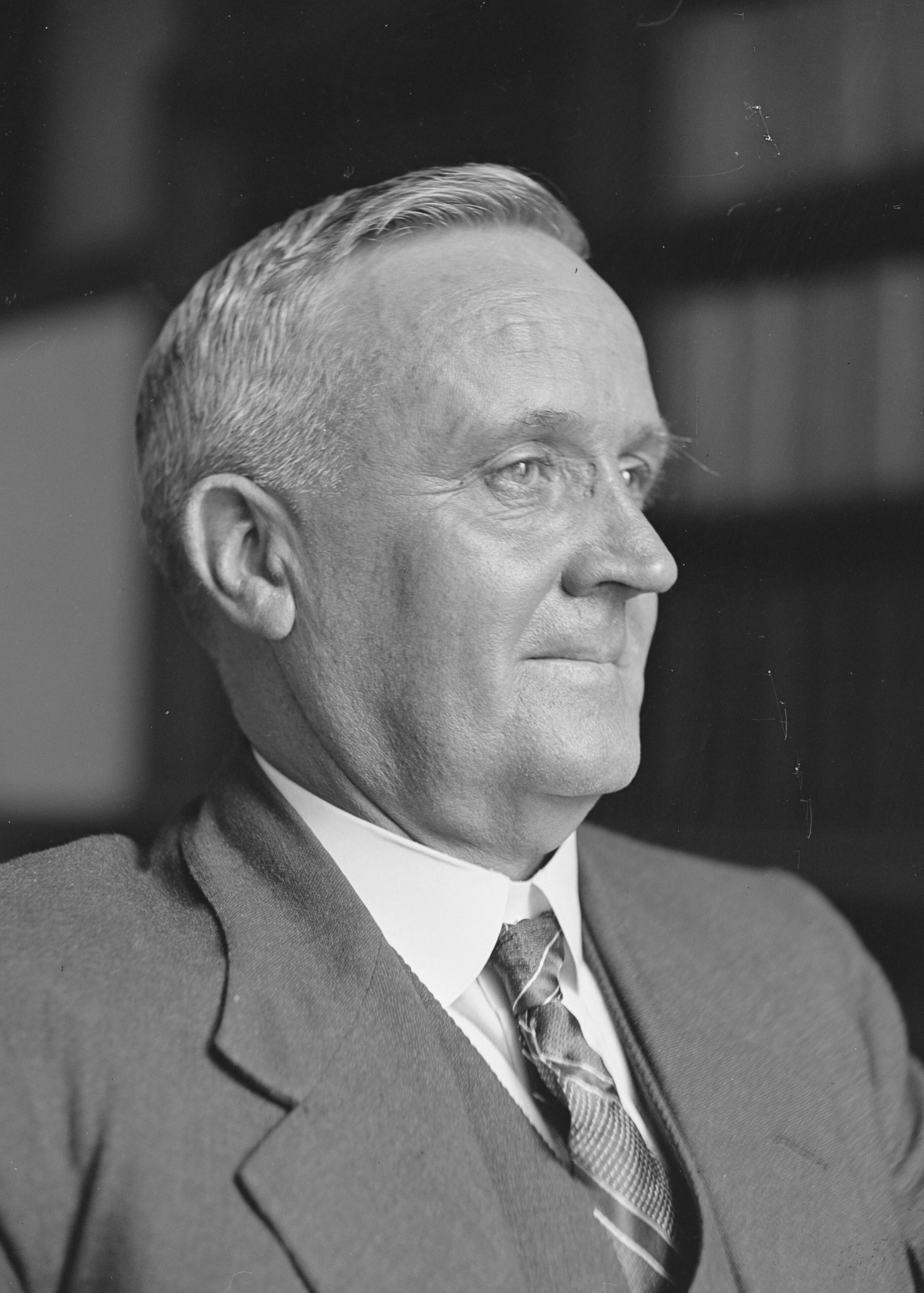
- Lane in 1932

Member of the Australian Parliament for Barton
- In office 19 December 1931 – 21 September 1940
- Preceded by: James Tully
- Succeeded by: Herbert Evatt

Personal details
- Born: 24 July 1873 Windsor, New South Wales, Australia
- Died: 29 December 1950 (aged 77) Bexley, New South Wales, Australia
- Party: Nationalist (to 1931); United Australia (from 1931)
- Spouse: Martha Settree (m. 1900)
- Children: Alby Lane (son)
- Occupation: Accountant

Albert Lane (24 July 1873 – 29 December 1950) was an Australian politician. He was a Nationalist Party member of the New South Wales Legislative Assembly for Balmain from 1922 to 1927 and a United Australia Party member of the Australian House of Representatives from 1931 to 1940.

== Early life ==
Lane was born on 24 July 1873 in Windsor, New South Wales. He was the youngest son and one of thirteen children born to Margaret (née Anderson) and John Lane. His father was a resident of Windsor for over 80 years, where he worked as a bootmaker and was prominent in the Methodist Church.

Lane moved to Sydney at seventeen, where he became an accountant. He was actively involved in the Methodist Church, was a keen temperance campaigner, and helped found and was a long-term council member of the New South Wales Home for Incurables. The 1916 liquor referendum which introduced six o'clock closing of pubs in New South Wales was reportedly largely due to his efforts as a temperance campaigner.

== State politics ==
Lane was elected to the New South Wales Legislative Assembly at the 1922 state election as one of four members for the seat of Balmain, representing the Nationalist Party. The seat was abolished in 1927, and Lane contested the new single-member seat of Leichhardt, but was defeated.

== Federal politics ==
In 1917 Lane contested the federal election as the unsuccessful Nationalist candidate for the safe Labor seat of Dalley.

Lane contested the 1931 federal election as the United Australia Party candidate for Barton, creating history by defeating both the incumbent member for Barton, James Tully, and the member for Martin, John Eldridge, who, as a member of the Lang Labor breakaway party, was attempting to transfer to Barton. Lane held the seat until 1940, when he was defeated by future Labor leader Herbert Evatt.

== Personal life ==
Lane married Martha Settree on 11 April 1900 in Chippendale, New South Wales. The couple had three sons and one daughter together, including Albert Stephen Lane who played rugby league for New South Wales.

In December 1941, Lane was hit by a motorist in Double Bay and broke both his legs. He died at his home at Bexley in December 1950 and was cremated at the Northern Suburbs Crematorium.

New South Wales Legislative Assembly
Preceded by John Doyle; Albert Smith	Member for Balmain; 1922–1927; Served alongside: Keegan, Quirk, Stopford/Evatt, Stuart-Robertson	Succeeded by Herbert Evatt
Parliament of Australia
Preceded by James Tully	Member for Barton; 1931 – 1940	Succeeded by Herbert Evatt
