= Walter Anderson (Australian politician) =

Australian politician

Walter Anderson (7 June 1865 – 27 April 1939) was an Australian politician.

He was born in Pyrmont to timekeeper Alexander Anderson and Jean Mackay. On 15 February 1888 he married Annie Andrews; they would have six children. A bookfinisher, he was elected to the New South Wales Legislative Assembly in 1904 as the Liberal member for Balmain. He was defeated in 1907. He worked with the Government Printing Office from 1904 to 1928, as a sub-overseer until 1916 and an overseer thereafter. He died in Manly in 1939.

New South Wales Legislative Assembly
New seat	Member for Balmain; 1904–1907	Succeeded by John Storey
