= Verity Firth =

Australian politician

The Honourable Verity Firth AM

Member of the New South Wales Parliament for Balmain
- In office 24 March 2007 – 26 March 2011
- Preceded by: New district
- Succeeded by: Jamie Parker

Minister for Education and Training
- In office 8 September 2008 – 28 March 2011
- Premier: Nathan Rees; Kristina Keneally
- Preceded by: John Della Bosca
- Succeeded by: Adrian Piccoli

Minister for Climate Change and the Environment
- In office 27 February 2008 – 5 September 2008
- Premier: Morris Iemma
- Preceded by: Phil Koperberg
- Succeeded by: Carmel Tebbutt

Minister for Women
- In office 2 April 2007 – 14 September 2009
- Premier: Morris Iemma; Nathan Rees
- Preceded by: Sandra Nori
- Succeeded by: Linda Burney

Personal details
- Born: Verity Helen Firth; 28 August 1973 (age 53)
- Party: Labor Party
- Spouse: Matthew Chesher
- Relations: Charles Firth (brother); Meredith Burgmann (aunt)
- Children: April Chesher; Clementine Chesher
- Education: University of Sydney
- Occupation: University Executive
- Profession: Lawyer
- Website: https://www.linkedin.com/in/verityfirth/

Verity Helen Firth AM (born 28 August 1973) is an Australian university executive and former politician. Since February 2024, Professor the Hon. Verity Firth AM is the Vice-President Societal Impact, Equity and Engagement at the University of New South Wales (UNSW). She is a Professor of Practice at the School of Education, Faculty of Arts, Design and Architecture. In 2015-2022, she was the Pro Vice-Chancellor (Social Justice and Inclusion) at the University of Technology Sydney. She was the chief executive officer of the Public Education Foundation in Australia.

Firth served as a member of the New South Wales Legislative Assembly representing the electorate of Balmain for the Labor Party from 2007 to 2011. During this period, she served as Minister for Women, Minister for Science and Medical Research, and Minister Assisting the Minister for Health (Cancer) from 2007 to 2008, Minister for Climate Change and the Environment in 2008, and as the Minister for Education and Training from 2008 to 2011.

== Career ==
Firth became a member of the Labor Party at the age of 15. She studied at North Sydney Girls High between 1986 and 1991, before studying Arts/Law at the University of Sydney between 1992 and 1998. While at university, she was active in student politics. After graduating, she worked as a political staffer, prior to working as an articled clerk at Slater & Gordon in 2001; she then worked as a campaign organiser for the Australian Labor Party (2001–2004). Between 2004 and 2007, she practised as a solicitor with Slater & Gordon, specialising in asbestos litigation and industrial law.

Firth was elected as a councillor of the City of Sydney in 2004. During her tenure on Council, she served for a period as Deputy Lord Mayor. Prior to entering state politics, she served on the board of the Law and Justice Foundation and Aidwatch.

Firth was elected to the new seat of Balmain on 24 March 2007. Though there was a swing away from the Labor, she won the seat with a majority of just below 4%. She was sworn in on 2 April 2007, receiving simultaneous appointment as Minister for Women, Minister for Science and Medical Research, Minister Assisting the Minister for Health (Cancer) and Minister Assisting the Minister for the Environment, Climate Change and Water (Environment).

On 22 February 2008, Phil Koperberg, Minister for the Environment, Climate Change and Water, resigned from cabinet due to ill health. Firth was subsequently appointed as Minister for Environment and Climate Change.

Following the caucus election of Nathan Rees as Leader of the NSW Labor Party and Premier in September 2008 and ensuing New South Wales government reshuffle, Firth was appointed as Minister for Education and Training. She won early praise for her demand to the federal government that it fund state public schools to the same level as private schools. During her tenure as Education Minister, she was regarded as a future Labor leader. Firth retained the Education portfolio under Rees' successor, Kristina Keneally.

During early 2009, the then Rees Labor Government announced the CBD Metro project. Controversial from the start, the CBD Metro project dominated the Sydney news for much of the year. Firth received media coverage for her opposition to the CBD metro, in the event that it would mean a bus interchange at Rozelle (due to the urban density of the area). Firth was also perceived as being at odds with economically conservative sections of the NSW Cabinet after her opposition to the privatisation of Sydney Ferries became public; at the time, the option of privatising Sydney's ferry fleet was examined by the NSW government against the opposition of unions and some residents. The Keneally government subsequently announced that the ferries would not be privatised.

Firth was defeated by Jamie Parker (representing the NSW Greens) as the Member for Balmain at the 2011 state election. After her defeat, Firth considered returning to work as a solicitor. Instead, however, she was appointed as CEO of the Public Education Foundation, an advocacy organisation providing scholarships for students in need of financial assistance.

In May 2014, Firth again won Labor preselection in the seat of Balmain for the 2015 state election. She lost the election to then sitting member, Jamie Parker.

Firth was appointed a Member of the Order of Australia in the 2023 Australia Day Honours.

== Personal life ==
Firth grew up in West Pymble and in Glebe. She lives in Glebe with her husband Matthew Chesher and their two children.

Her brother is Charles Firth, a comedian and member of The Chaser. Her aunt is Meredith Burgmann, the former NSW upper house president. Firth is the great-granddaughter of Anglican Bishop Ernest Burgmann.

In January 2011 Firth's husband, Matthew Chesher, was charged by police for possession of the illegal drug, ecstasy. Chesher resigned immediately as chief of staff to Minister for Roads David Borger. Firth said she was "angry, hurt and very disappointed". Verity refused to say how many tablets Chesher was buying and refused to say whether she had ever taken drugs. Chesher was charged with the possession of one ecstasy tablet and subsequently placed on a 12-month good-behaviour bond with no conviction being recorded.

Civic offices
Preceded by John McInerney	Deputy Lord Mayor of Sydney; 2005 – 2006	Succeeded by Chris Harris
New South Wales Legislative Assembly
New district	Member for Balmain; 2007 – 2011	Succeeded by Jamie Parker
Political offices
Preceded by Sandra Nori	Minister for Women; 2007 – 2009	Succeeded by Linda Burney
Preceded by Frank Sartor	Minister for Science and Medical Research; Minister Assisting the Minister for Health (Cancer); 2007 – 2008	Succeeded by Tony Stewart
Preceded by Phil Koperberg	Minister for Climate Change and the Environment; 2008	Succeeded by Carmel Tebbutt
Preceded by John Della Bosca	Minister for Education and Training; 2008 – 2011	Succeeded by Adrian Piccoli as Minister for Education
