= James Mercer (Australian politician) =

Australian politician

James Ballantine Mercer (1842 – 4 November 1925) was a Scottish-born Australian politician.

He was born in Glasgow to tobacco spinner William Mercer and Grace Dixon. He left school at a young age to work as a woodcarver's apprentice in Sheffield, and then worked as a lay reader for the Church of England. Around 1867 he married Rachel Fearnley, with whom he had four children. He emigrated to Queensland in 1883 and moved to Sydney in 1885, working as a caretaker at the Seaman's Institute at Circular Quay. Around 1907 he married Mary Ann Burley in Melbourne. An active Labor Party member, he was elected to the New South Wales Legislative Assembly in 1907 as the member for Rozelle. Around 1915 he married his third wife, Margaret Stewart. In 1916 Mercer left the Labor Party as part of the conscription split, and he did not recontest his seat in 1917. He died at Lakemba in 1925.

New South Wales Legislative Assembly
| Preceded by Sydney Law | Member for Rozelle; 1907–1917 | Succeeded by John Quirk |
