= Jamie Parker (politician) =

Australian politician (born 1971)

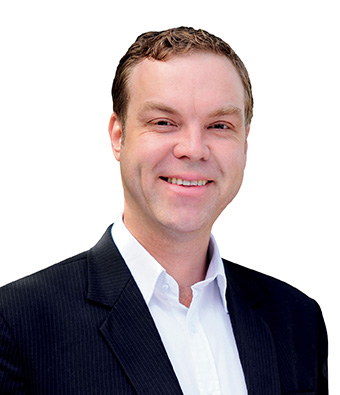
- Parker at the NSW election campaign launch, March 2011

Member of the New South Wales Parliament for Balmain
- In office 26 March 2011 – 3 March 2023
- Preceded by: Verity Firth
- Succeeded by: Kobi Shetty
- Majority: 4.9% (2015)

37th Mayor of Leichhardt
- In office 13 September 2008 – 19 May 2011
- Preceded by: Carolyn Allen
- Succeeded by: Rochelle Porteous

Personal details
- Born: Jamie Thomas Parker; 1971 (age 54–55) Wellingborough, Northamptonshire, England
- Party: Greens New South Wales
- Education: Macquarie University

Jamie Thomas Parker (born 1971) is an Australian politician who was a member of the New South Wales Legislative Assembly representing Balmain for the Greens from 2011 until his retirement in 2023. Parker was the first Green to represent his party in the New South Wales Legislative Assembly.

== Political career ==
Parker has been active in social justice and environmental issues for many years and while at university was elected the NSW president and subsequently the national environment officer of the National Union of Students.

Parker stood for and was elected to Leichhardt Council in 1999 as a NSW Greens member. Parker was subsequently re-elected in 2004 and 2008. While on Council he has served as chair of the Environment Committee, as deputy mayor and, since 2008, as the mayor of Leichhardt. He retired from Council at the 2012 election.

Parker has served as the convenor (state party chairman) of the NSW Greens.

Parker won the seat of Balmain from Labor's Verity Firth at the 2011 state election. He is the first member of the NSW Greens to sit in the Lower House of the New South Wales Parliament.

Parker announced that he would not be contesting the 2023 state election on 14 October 2022. He was succeeded in Balmain by fellow Green Kobi Shetty.

== Post-political career ==
Since 2023, Parker has been the State Manager of the NSW Greens.

Civic offices
Preceded by Carolyn Allen	Mayor of Leichhardt; 2008–2011	Succeeded by Rochelle Porteous
New South Wales Legislative Assembly
Preceded by Verity Firth	Member for Balmain; 2011–2023	Succeeded by Kobi Shetty
