= Peter Crawford (Australian politician) =

Australian politician

Peter Crawford

Peter Thomson Crawford (born 1 July 1949) is a former Australian politician. He was the Labor member for Balmain in the New South Wales Legislative Assembly from 1984 to 1988.

Crawford was born in Ashfield in Sydney, and attended Burwood Public School, Fort Street Boys' High School and the University of Sydney, where he received his Bachelor of Arts and Diploma of Education. He became a school teacher and worked as a legal officer from 1973–75; he was also elected President of Young Labor in 1974. In 1976 he became a research officer for former Deputy Premier Jack Ferguson, before becoming a newspaper publisher in 1980. In that year he was elected to Leichhardt Council, serving until 1984. He briefly returned to teaching in 1983.

In 1984, Crawford was preselected for the safe state Labor seat of Balmain, where the sitting MP Roger Degen retired. Crawford won easily, but in 1988 he was challenged by former Olympic swimmer Dawn Fraser, running as an Independent. Although Crawford led on the primary votes, preferences from the Liberal Party and other independents delivered the seat to Fraser with a margin of 1.7%. Crawford has not returned to politics.

New South Wales Legislative Assembly
Preceded by Roger Degen	Member for Balmain; 1984–1988	Succeeded by Dawn Fraser
