= Robert Stuart-Robertson =

Australian politician

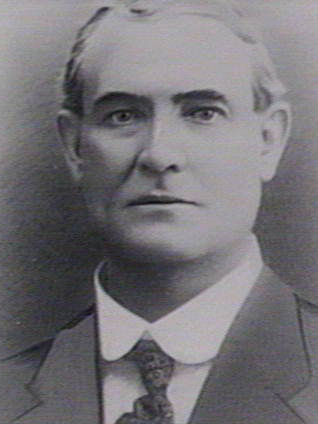
Robert Stuart-Robertson, Minister for Public Health

Robert James Stuart-Robertson (16 September 1866 – 2 June 1933) was an Australian politician. He was a member of the New South Wales Legislative Assembly from 1907 until his death and was the Minister for Public Health for 4 months in 1927. He was a member of the Labor Party.

== Biography ==
Stuart-Robertson was born in Booligal and was the son of Robert John Stuart Robertson, a self-proclaimed doctor, and Catherine Eleanor JOYCE. Stuart-Robertson's birth date has been claimed as 10 August 1874, however the date of 16 September 1866 is evidenced by his official birth record. He was educated to elementary level at Bourke, where his family moved after his father's alleged death when Stuart-Robertson was 4 years old. Despite the rumour that Robert senior had died during the 1870s in Queensland, Robert senior died on 3 July 1899 at George Street Asylum, Parramatta, New South Wales.

Stuart-Robertson undertook a number of unsuccessful retail businesses in Bourke and Cobar. During this time he became active in the ALP and was a delegate to the annual State Labor Conference. In 1905 he moved to Sydney and worked as a shop assistant. He helped to found the Shop Assistants Union.

At the 1907 general election, he was the Australian Labor Party candidate for the Legislative Assembly seat of Camperdown and defeated the sitting member James Smith. The seat of Camperdown was abolished when NSW elections were conducted using proportional representation with multi-member seats between 1920 and 1927. During this time Stuart-Robertson was the ALP member for Balmain. With the reintroduction of single member seats in 1927 he became the member for Annandale, which he represented until his death.

Stuart-Robertson remained loyal to the party leader, Jack Lang during the numerous and complex schisms that occurred in the NSW branch of the party in the 1920s and 30s (see Lang Labor). Lang described him as a "strait-laced reformer" who dressed in a deacon's coat and objected to the advertising of alcohol. As a result, he was unpopular in caucus and his only ministerial appointment was as Minister for Health in a caretaker government prior to the 1927 election. Lang formed this government solely from his supporters when he encountered significant opposition from the caucus elected cabinet.

Stuart-Robertson, under the pen name of "D Ross" and at the time Secretary of the Cobar School of Arts, authored a novel entitled A Woman (A Tale of Australian Life in the Early Fifties), published in 1901 by J A Bradley of the Cobar Leader office, Barton Street, Cobar, New South Wales. A copy of this book is held in the rare books section of the Mitchell Library, New South Wales.

Political offices
Preceded by George Cann	Minister for Public Health; 1927	Succeeded by Richard Arthur
New South Wales Legislative Assembly
Preceded by Percy Colquhoun	Chairman of Committees; 1920–1922	Succeeded by Bruce Walker
Preceded by James Smith	Member for Camperdown; 1907–1920	District abolished
Preceded by John Storey	Member for Balmain; 1920–1927; With: John Storey / Tom Keegan; John Doyle / Robert Stopford / H. V. Evatt; John Quirk; Albert Smith / Albert Lane	Succeeded by H. V. Evatt
New district	Member for Annandale; 1927–1933	Succeeded by Bob Gorman
