= Mary Quirk =

Australian politician (1880–1952)

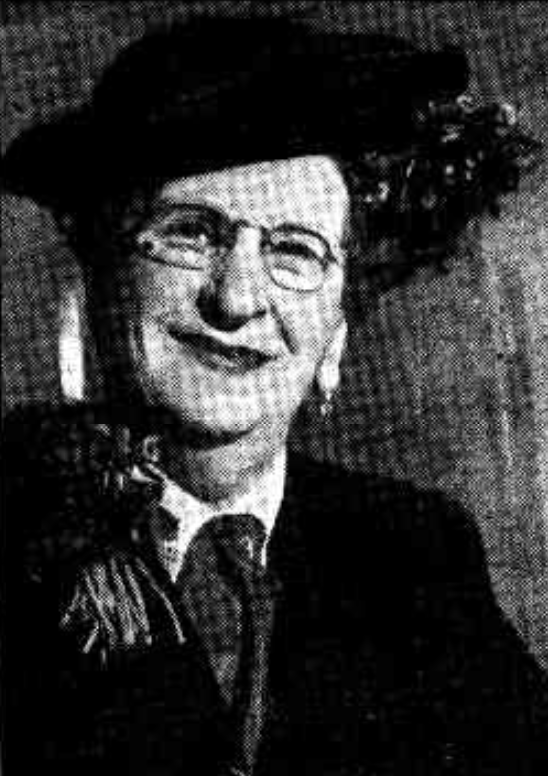

Member of the New South Wales Legislative Assembly
- In office 14 January 1939 – 22 May 1950
- Preceded by: John Quirk
- Succeeded by: John McMahon
- Constituency: Balmain

Personal details
- Born: Mary Lilly May Deal; 7 December 1880 Coonamble, New South Wales, Australia
- Died: 4 March 1952 (aged 71) Sydney, New South Wales, Australia
- Party: Labor (to 1950); Independent (1950)
- Other political affiliations: Lang Labor
- Spouse(s): John Kelly (m. 1898; died 1926) John Quirk (m. 1927; died 1939)
- Occupation: Domestic servant Shop assistant

Mary Lilly May Quirk (née Deal; 7 December 1880 – 4 March 1952) was an Australian politician. She was a member of the New South Wales Legislative Assembly from 1939 to 1950, winning the seat of Balmain after the death of her husband John Quirk. She was associated with the Lang Labor faction of the Australian Labor Party (ALP) and stood against endorsed ALP candidates on several occasions.

== Early life ==
Quirk was born on 7 December 1880 in Coonamble, New South Wales. She was the second child born to Emma Margretta (née White) and Julius Franz Frederick Deal.

Quirk moved to Sydney as a child where her father worked as a butcher in Balmain. She attended Rozelle Superior Public School. After leaving school she worked as a domestic servant until her marriage to John Kelly in 1898. She later worked as a shop assistant, including with Grace Bros, and was a member of the Shop Assistants' Union of New South Wales. She was widowed in 1926 and remarried the following year to John Quirk, a long-serving member of state parliament. She effectively acted as her husband's campaign manager.

== Politics ==
Quirk's second husband died in December 1938. She was elected to his seat in the New South Wales Legislative Assembly at the 1939 Balmain state by-election, defeating two "independent Labor" candidates. Her preselection was carried out by the Lang Labor faction of the ALP, and she reportedly defeated eight other candidates including former state attorney-general Joe Lamaro. She pledged her personal support to ALP leader Jack Lang, who backed her candidacy.

Quirk was the second woman elected to the Legislative Assembly, after Millicent Preston-Stanley, and the first from the ALP. She joined Lang's breakaway Australian Labor Party (Non-Communist) in 1940, which rejoined the official ALP the following year. She was re-elected at the 1941, 1944 and 1947 state elections. In April 1950, following a lengthy preselection process, Quirk was defeated for ALP preselection in Balmain by John McMahon. An initial ballot was overturned by the party's disputes committee. She resigned from the ALP on 23 May 1950 to seek re-election as an independent. She was unsuccessful, losing to McMahon at the 1950 state election.

== Personal life ==
Quirk had one son and three daughters from her first marriage; her son predeceased her. After leaving parliament she was a director of a children's home. She died on 4 March 1952 at Sydney Hospital, aged 71.

New South Wales Legislative Assembly
Preceded by John Quirk	Member for Balmain; 1939 – 1950	Succeeded by John McMahon
