= John McMahon (Australian politician) =

Australian politician

The Honourable John McMahon

Minister for Lands
- In office 1 April 1959 – 31 May 1960
- Premier: Joseph Cahill; Bob Heffron
- Preceded by: William Gollan
- Succeeded by: Jack Renshaw

Minister for Transport
- In office 31 May 1960 – 13 May 1965
- Premier: Bob Heffron; Jack Renshaw
- Preceded by: George Enticknap
- Succeeded by: Milton Morris

Alderman of the Balmain Municipal Council
- In office 5 December 1942 – 2 December 1944
- Preceded by: Michael McMahon
- Constituency: South-West Ward

Personal details
- Born: 21 February 1914 Hobart, Tasmania, Australia
- Died: 19 May 1975 (aged 61) Sydney, New South Wales, Australia
- Party: Labor

Military service
- Allegiance: Australia
- Branch/service: Australian Army
- Years of service: 1943–1945
- Rank: Lance Sergeant
- Unit: Royal Australian Engineers; 2/11 Australian Army Transport Company
- Battles/wars: Second World War

John Michael Alfred McMahon (21 February 1914 – 19 May 1975) was an Australian politician and a member of the New South Wales Legislative Assembly from 1950 until 1968. He was a member of the Labor Party and held ministerial positions including Minister for Transport and Minister for Lands.

== Early life ==
McMahon was born in Hobart, Tasmania and was the son of, Michael Hubert McMahon (d. 1942), a clerk who later became the Mayor of Balmain. He was educated at the Christian Brother's, Rozelle and was employed as a store manager for Coles & Co. He served in the Second Australian Imperial Force in the Engineers' Corps from 1943 to 1945 and reached the rank of Lance Sergeant. He later ran a delicatessen in Rozelle and was a member of the shop assistants' union. He was elected as an alderman on Balmain Municipal Council between 1942 and 1944, when the council was composed entirely of Labor councillors. His father was mayor before he joined the council, and McMahon filled his place on the council at a December 1942 by-election.

== Political career ==
McMahon entered the New South Wales Parliament at the 1950 state election as the labor member for Balmain. He defeated the sitting Labor member Mary Quirk who had lost her party endorsement. McMahon was a member of the governments of Joseph Cahill, Robert Heffron and Jack Renshaw. He was appointed as a Minister without portfolio in 1957 and became the first Minister for Lands in 1959.

In 1960 he was commissioned as the Minister for Transport and he held this position until the defeat of the Labor government at the 1965 election. He retained his seat and retired at the 1968 election. He died age 61 in 1975 and was buried at Field of Mars Cemetery, East Ryde, following a service at St Joseph's Church, Rozelle.

New South Wales Legislative Assembly
Preceded by Mary Quirk	Member for Balmain; 1950 – 1968	Succeeded by Roger Degen
Political offices
Preceded by William Gollan as Secretary for Lands	Minister for Lands; 1959 – 1960	Succeeded by Jack Renshaw
Preceded by George Enticknap	Minister for Transport; 1960 – 1965	Succeeded by Milton Morris
