= Tom Keegan (politician) =

Australian politician (1878–1937)

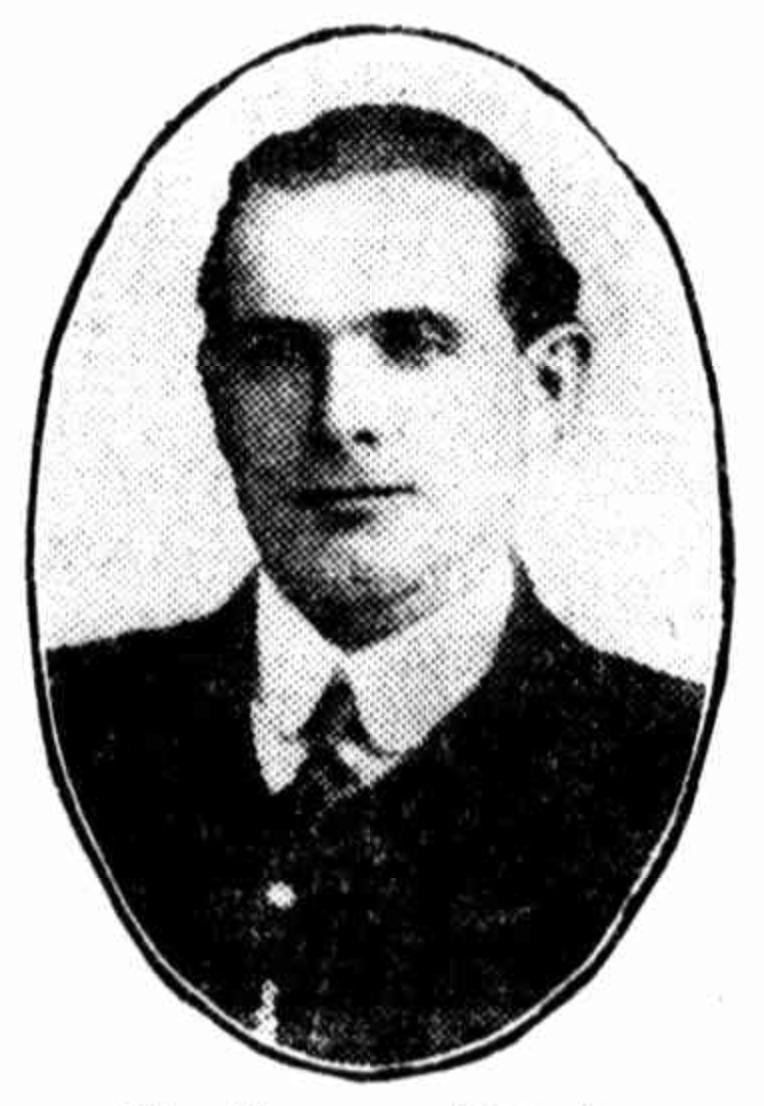
Keegan in 1922

Thomas Michael Keegan (29 May 1878 – 14 September 1937) was an Australian politician.

Born in Ararat, Victoria to miner John Walter Keegan and Mary Flood, he attended primary schools before becoming a miner at Wyalong. Active in the miners' union and the Labor Party, he moved to Sydney around 1901. Around 1902 he married Marie Hallan, with whom he had three children; he would remarry Doris Martin around 1927. In 1910 he was elected to the New South Wales Legislative Assembly as the Labor member for the Glebe.

Keegan was elected president of the Glebe Rugby League Club, a position he would remain in until 1920.

Keegan was defeated in the election of 1920 after the introduction of proportional representation but returned to the Assembly on 18 October 1921 as the only unsuccessful Labor candidate at the 1920 election for Balmain, filling the casual vacancy caused by the death of the Premier John Storey. When proportional representation was abandoned in 1927 he returned to his old seat of Glebe, serving until 1935. From May to October 1927 he served as Minister for Local Government. Keegan died in 1937 in Sydney.

His brother John was a member of the New South Wales Legislative Council from 1925 to 1934.

New South Wales Legislative Assembly
| Preceded by James Hogue | Member for Glebe; 1910–1920 | District abolished |
| Preceded by John Storey | Member for Balmain; 1921–1927; With: Doyle/Stopford/Evatt; Quirk; Smith/Lane; Stuart-Robertson | Succeeded by H. V. Evatt |
| New district | Member for Glebe; 1927–1935 | Succeeded by Bill Carlton |
