= Electoral district of Balmain =

State electoral district of New South Wales, Australia

Balmain New South Wales—Legislative Assembly
- Interactive map of district boundaries from the 2023 state election
- State: New South Wales
- Created: 1885, 2007
- Abolished: 1894, 1991
- MP: Kobi Shetty
- Party: Greens
- Namesake: Balmain
- Electors: 58,785 (2023)
- Area: 16.14 km^{2} (6.2 sq mi)
- Demographic: Inner metropolitan
Electorates around Balmain:
Drummoyne	Lane Cove	North Shore
Drummoyne; Summer Hill	Balmain	Sydney
Summer Hill	Newtown	Newtown

Balmain is an electoral district of the Legislative Assembly of the Australian state of New South Wales. It is in Sydney's Inner West, just west of the district of Sydney.

Since 2023 the member for Balmain has been Kobi Shetty of the Greens. Following the 2023 state election Balmain is one of three seats held by the Greens.

== Geography ==
On its current boundaries, Balmain includes the suburbs and localities of Annandale, Balmain, Balmain East, Birchgrove, Forest Lodge, Glebe, Glebe Island, Leichhardt, Lilyfield, Rozelle, White Bay and parts of Camperdown and Ultimo.

== History ==
Balmain was established in 1880 and from 1882, it elected two members, from 1885 it elected three members and from 1889 until 1894 it elected four members simultaneously. Voters cast a vote for each vacancy and the leading candidates were elected. In 1894 it was split into Balmain North, Balmain South, Annandale and Leichhardt, each electing one member. In 1904 with the downsizing of the Assembly after Federation, Balmain North and part of Balmain South were combined into a single electorate, electing one member. In 1920, parts of the electoral districts of Balmain, Annandale, Camperdown, Darling Harbour, Glebe and Rozelle were combined to create a new incarnation of Balmain, which elected five members by proportional representation. This was replaced by single member electorates of Balmain, Annandale, Glebe and Rozelle for the 1927 election. Balmain was abolished in 1991, being replaced by Port Jackson. It was recreated for the 2007 election, taking in large parts of the abolished district of Port Jackson (the Sydney CBD and Pyrmont, which were previously in Port Jackson, became part of the new Electoral district of Sydney).

Historically, Balmain has been a working-class seat and very safe for Labor—at the 1978 election, Labor won an 84.2 percent two-party vote. However, as with several inner-city seats, demographic change and the rise of the Greens has seen a strong Green vote in Balmain since the party first contested the seat from the seat's recreation at the 2007 election. Following the 2019 election, it is considered a safe Greens seat.

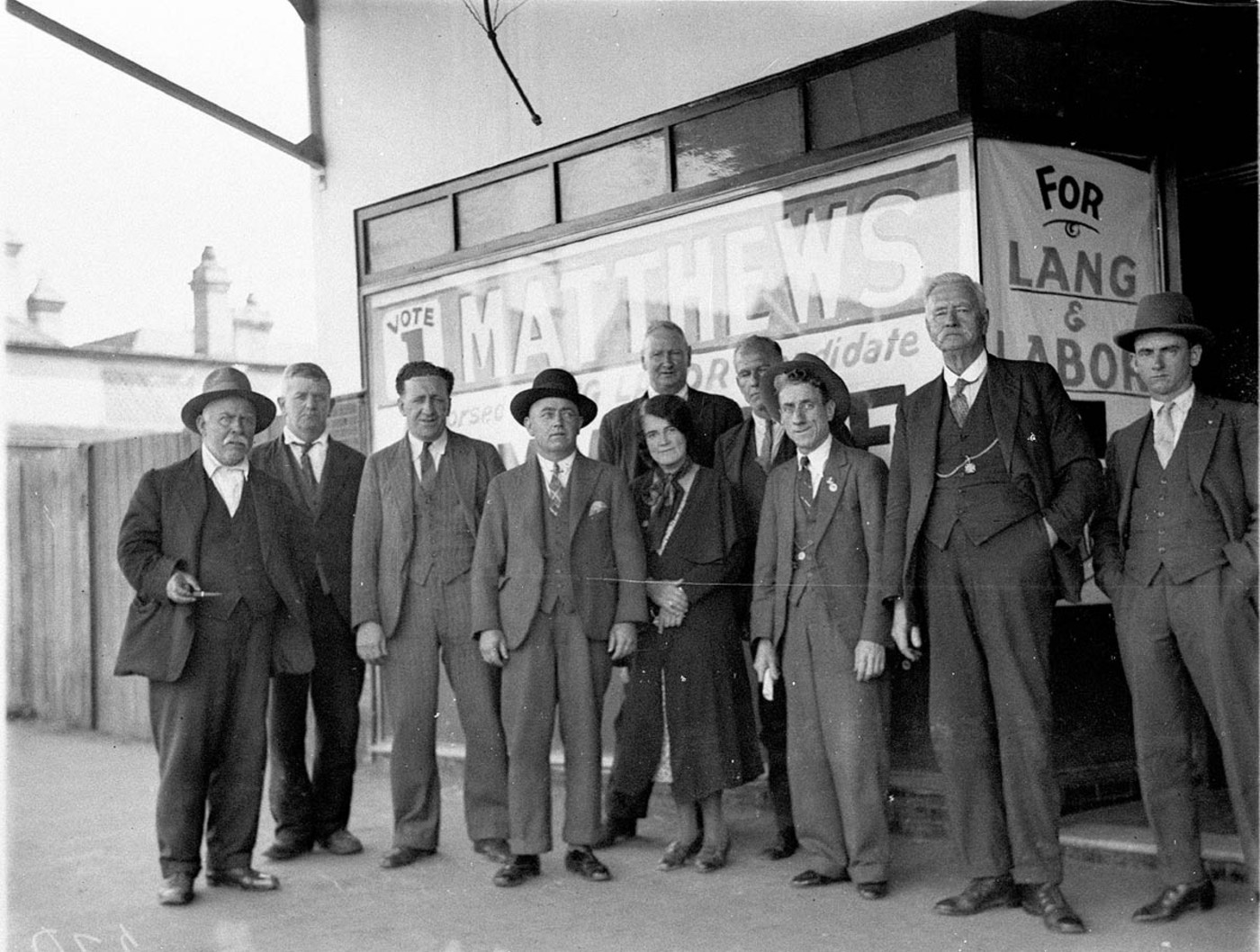
Matthews' ALP supporters. Photograph by Sam Hood taken about 1934

Following the 2023 New South Wales state election, the seat became a marginal Greens seat following the retirement of Jamie Parker.

== Members for Balmain ==
First incarnation (1880–1894)
1880–1882, 1 member
Member	Party	Term												
Jacob Garrard	None	1880–1882												
1882–1885, 2 members
Member	Party	Term	Member	Party	Term									
Jacob Garrard	None	1882–1885	William Hutchinson	None	1882–1885									
1885–1889, 3 members
Member	Party	Term	Member	Party	Term	Member	Party	Term						
Jacob Garrard	None	1885–1887	Solomon Hyam	None	1885–1887	John Hawthorne	None	1885–1887						
Jacob Garrard	Free Trade	1887–1889	Frank Smith	Free Trade	1887–1889	John Hawthorne	Free Trade	1887–1889						
1889–1894, 4 members
Member	Party	Term	Member	Party	Term	Member	Party	Term	Member	Party	Term			
Jacob Garrard	Free Trade	1889–1891	Frank Smith	Free Trade	1889–1891	John Hawthorne	Free Trade	1889–1891	George Clubb	Free Trade	1889–1891			
George Clark	Labour	1891–1891	Edward Darnley	Labour	1891–1894	James Johnston	Labour	1891–1894	William Murphy	Labour	1891–1894			
George Clark	Free Trade	1891–1894	Edward Darnley	Labour	1891–1894	James Johnston	Labour	1891–1894	William Murphy	Labour	1891–1894			
Second incarnation (1904–1991)
1904–1920, 1 member
Member	Party	Term												
Walter Anderson	Liberal Reform	1904–1907												
John Storey	Labour	1907–1920												
1920–1927, 5 members
Member	Party	Term	Member	Party	Term	Member	Party	Term	Member	Party	Term	Member	Party	Term
John Storey	Labor	1920–1921	John Doyle	Labor	1920–1922	Robert Stuart-Robertson	Labor	1920–1927	John Quirk	Labor	1920–1927	Albert Smith	Nationalist	1920–1922
Tom Keegan	Labor	1921 (Note: John Storey died and Tom Keegan was appointed to replace him in accordance with the Parliamentary Elections (Casual Vacancies) Act 1920.)–1927	John Doyle	Labor	1920–1922	Robert Stuart-Robertson	Labor	1920–1927	John Quirk	Labor	1920–1927	Albert Smith	Nationalist	1920–1922
Tom Keegan	Labor	1921 –1927	Robert Stopford	Nationalist	1922–1925	Robert Stuart-Robertson	Labor	1920–1927	John Quirk	Labor	1920–1927	Albert Lane	Nationalist	1922–1927
Tom Keegan	Labor	1921 –1927	H. V. Evatt	Labor	1925–1927	Robert Stuart-Robertson	Labor	1920–1927	John Quirk	Labor	1920–1927	Albert Lane	Nationalist	1922–1927
1927–1991, 1 member
Member	Party	Term												
H. V. Evatt	Independent Labor	1927–1930												
John Quirk	Labor	1930–1938												
Mary Quirk	Labor	1939–1940												
Mary Quirk	Labor (N-C)	1940–1941												
Mary Quirk	Labor	1941–1950												
Mary Quirk	Independent Labor	1950–1950												
John McMahon	Labor	1950–1968												
Roger Degen	Labor	1968–1984												
Peter Crawford	Labor	1984–1988												
Dawn Fraser	Independent	1988–1991												
Third incarnation (2007–present, 1 member)
Member	Party	Term												
Verity Firth	Labor	2007–2011												
Jamie Parker	Greens	2011–2023												
Kobi Shetty	Greens	2023–present												

== Election results ==
2023 New South Wales state election: Balmain
Party	Candidate	Votes	%	±%
Greens	Kobi Shetty	20,240	40.48	−2.25
Labor	Philippa Scott	18,555	37.11	+8.25
Liberal	Freya Leach	9,566	19.13	−0.90
Sustainable Australia	Stephen Bisgrove	1,189	2.38	+0.84
Public Education	Glen Stelzer	447	0.89	+0.89
Total formal votes		49,997	98.39	−0.05
Informal votes		820	1.61	+0.05
Turnout		50,817	86.45	−0.28
Notional two-party-preferred count
Labor	Philippa Scott	32,752	74.50	+4.05
Liberal	Freya Leach	11,208	25.50	−4.05
Two-candidate-preferred result
Greens	Kobi Shetty	22,118	51.80	−8.22
Labor	Philippa Scott	20,580	48.20	+8.22
Greens hold		Swing	−8.22	
