= John Storey (politician) =

20th Premier of New South Wales

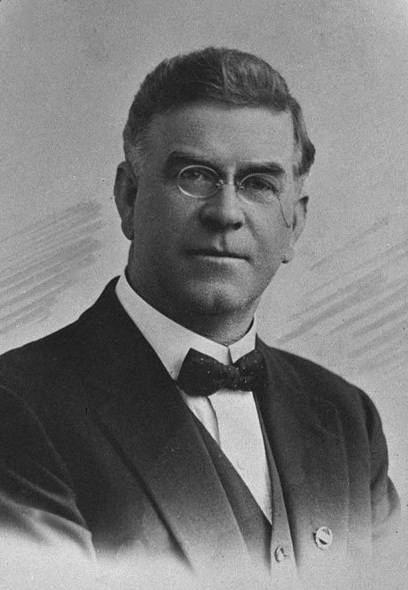

20th Premier of New South Wales
- In office 13 April 1920 – 5 October 1921
- Preceded by: William Holman
- Succeeded by: James Dooley

Personal details
- Born: 15 May 1869 Huskisson, New South Wales
- Died: 5 October 1921 (aged 52) Darlinghurst, Sydney, New South Wales, Australia
- Party: Labor Party

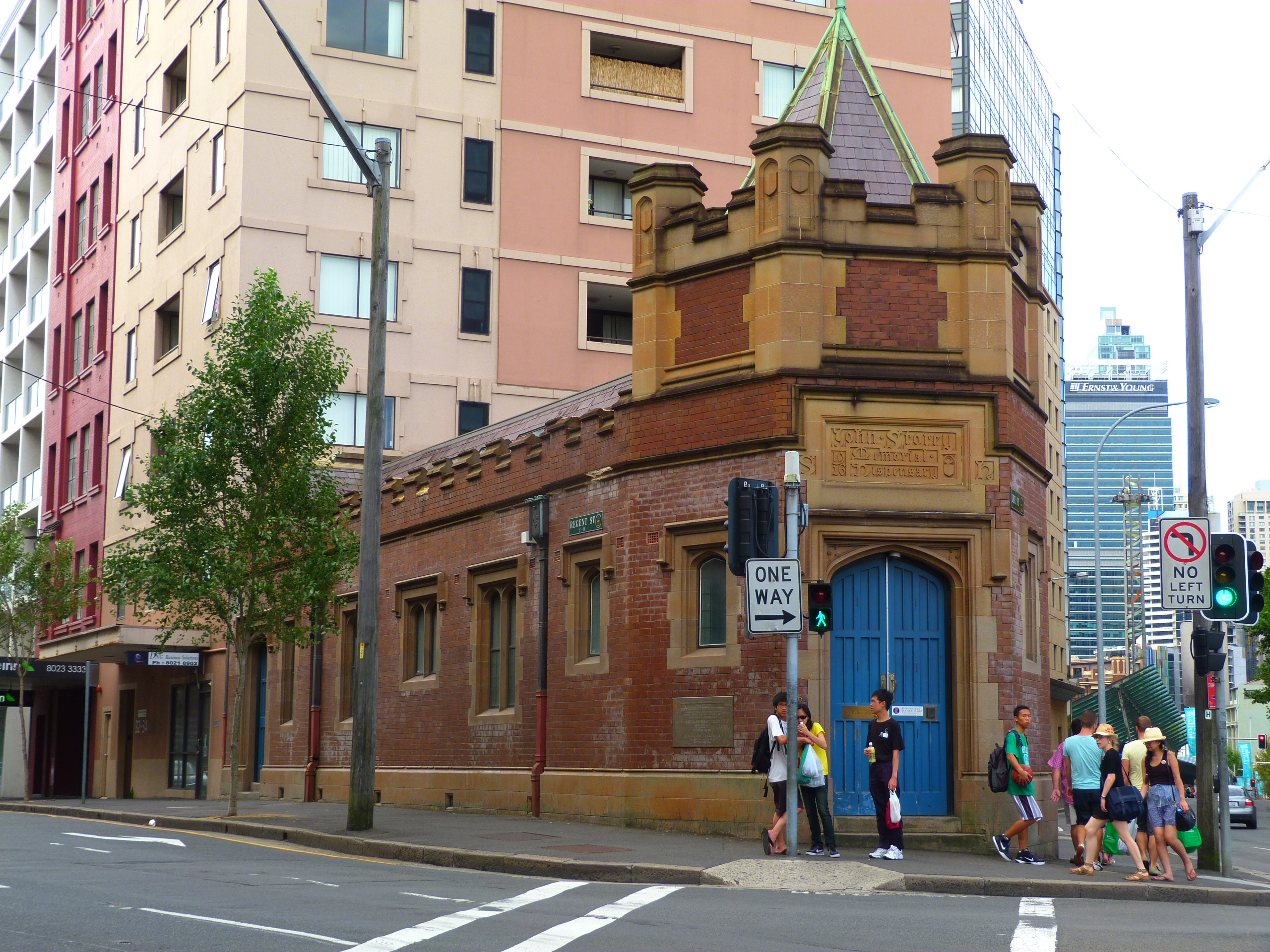
John Storey Memorial Clinic, Chippendale

John Storey (15 May 1869 – 5 October 1921) was an Australian politician who was Premier of New South Wales from 12 April 1920 until his sudden death in Sydney. His leadership enabled the New South Wales Labor Party to recover after the split over conscription.

== Early life ==
Storey was born at or near Huskisson, New South Wales, Australia to English immigrant parents, William John, a shipbuilder, and Elizabeth Graham. His family moved to Balmain when he was six, but his father died soon afterwards. He was educated at Darling Road Superior Public School and at night school. At fourteen he was apprenticed to boilermaking with Perdriau and West and then worked at Mort's Dock. He helped found the Balmain Cricket Club in 1897 and was a leading all-rounder for its top grade team. He was a member of the United Society of Boilermakers and Iron Ship Builders of New South Wales. In 1908 Storey was a founder of the Balmain District Rugby League Football Club.

== Elected to Parliament ==
Storey joined the Labor Electoral League, the precursor of the Labor Party, on its foundation in 1891, and was elected to represent Balmain North in the Legislative Assembly in 1901. Although he was an effective parliamentarian, he was beaten for election to the recreated seat of Balmain by Walter Anderson in 1904, but defeated Anderson in 1907. The McGowen Labor government came to power in 1910, but Storey did not nominate for election to Cabinet.

In 1916, the non-parliamentary party attempted to discipline Premier William Holman, and elected a Cabinet headed by Storey on 27 April. The party reversed that decision on 4 May and Storey handed back power to Holman, although legally there had never been any transfer of power. However, the split in the party widened further with the dispute over conscription and, in November, Holman, along with Prime Minister Billy Hughes, were expelled from the party. The remnants of the Labor Party were then in opposition to Holman's Nationalist Government, but Storey refused to become party leader and Ernest Durack was elected to that position. Durack resigned unexpectedly in February 1917 and Storey had no choice but to accept the leadership. His good public speaking and amiability helped to reduce the scale of Labor's defeat in the 1917 election. His policy speech for the 1920 election promised child endowment and suburban rail electrification.

== Premier ==
Labor won the 1920 election with a majority of one and Storey became Premier. His thin majority, combined with a substantial minority in Legislative Council (made up of life appointees) and attacks of nephritis made his job hard. His private secretary at this time was V. Gordon Childe, later internationally famous in the field of archaeology, who wrote the book How Labor Governs, based on his experience as Storey's secretary. In June 1920, he appointed Judge Norman Ewing to carry out a royal commission in to the imprisonment of twelve IWW members in 1916 for treason, arson, sedition and forgery. On Ewing's recommendation, ten were released in August. In early 1921, he prorogued Parliament to prevent his Government being overthrown during a six months absence to visit financiers and a Harley Street doctor in London. Despite the warnings of his doctor, he undertook heavy work in London and on his return to Sydney in July.

== Death ==
He was admitted to hospital and died at Clermont Private Hospital, Darlinghurst and was survived by his wife, three sons and two of his three daughters. His funeral service was held at St. Andrew's Cathedral on 7 October 1921, and he was buried at the Field of Mars Cemetery in Ryde the same day.

In 1926, Premier Jack Lang opened the John Storey Memorial Dispensary in Little Regent Street, Chippendale, New South Wales. It served as a practical memorial to John Storey and still functions as a pathology clinic.

== Notes ==
New South Wales Legislative Assembly
| Preceded by Bill Wilks | Member for Balmain North; 1901–1904 | District abolished |
| Preceded by Walter Anderson | Member for Balmain; 1907–1920 | Succeeded by Himself & 4 others |
| Preceded by Himself | Member for Balmain; 1920–1921; Served alongside: Doyle, Quirk, Smith, Stuart-Robertson | Succeeded by Tom Keegan |
Political offices
| Preceded by William Holman | Premier of New South Wales; 1920–1921 | Succeeded by James Dooley |
Party political offices
| Preceded by Ernest Durack | Leader of the Australian Labor Party in New South Wales; 1917–1921 | Succeeded by James Dooley |
