= Kobi Shetty =

Politician in the New South Wales Legislative Assembly

Councillor Kobi Shetty MP
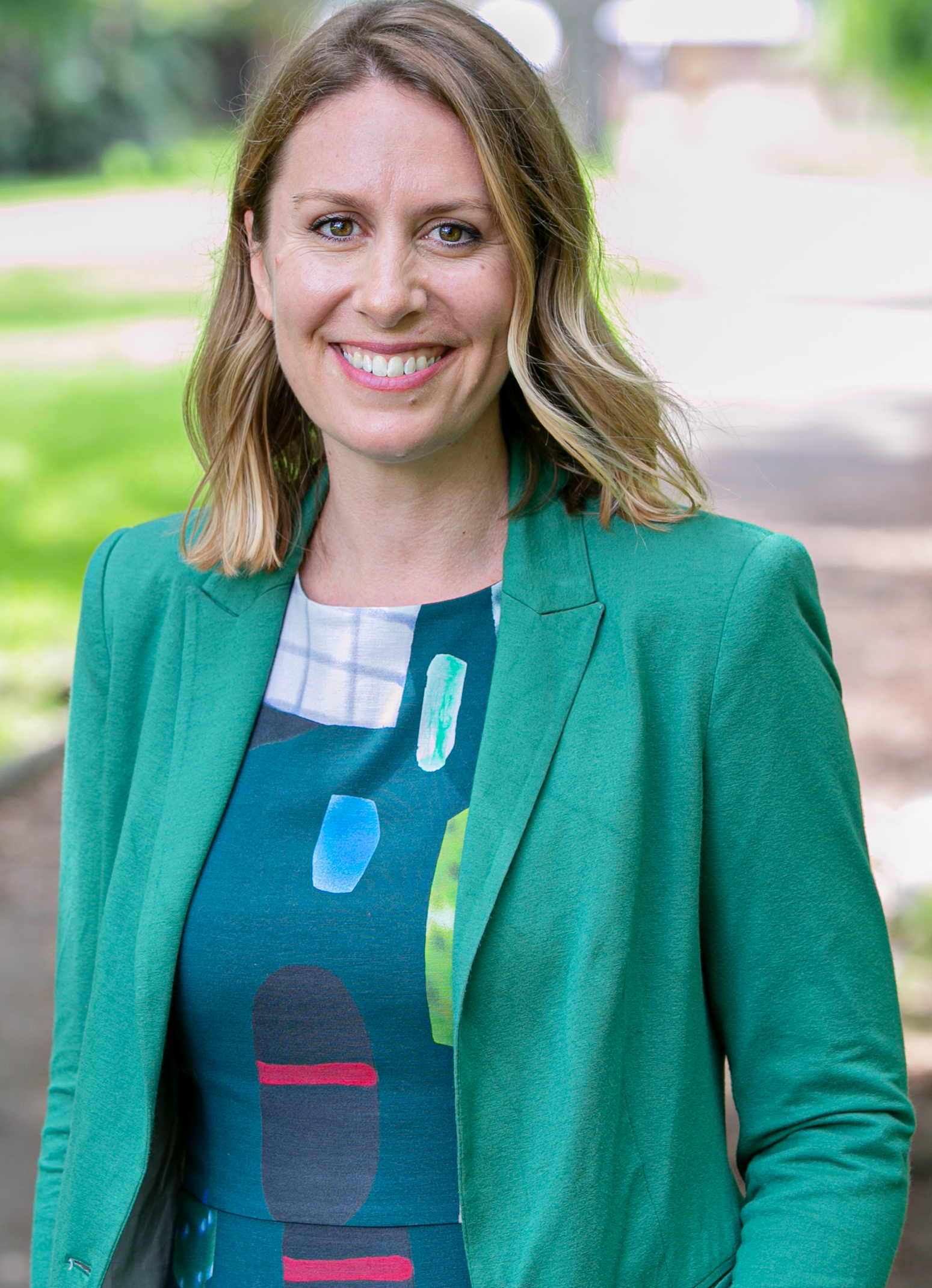

Member of the New South Wales Parliament for Balmain
- Incumbent
- Assumed office 25 March 2023
- Preceded by: Jamie Parker
- Preceded by: Rochelle Porteous

Personal details
- Party: Greens
- Occupation: Financial fraud prevention specialist
- Website: www.kobishetty.org.au

Kobi Lee Shetty is the member of the New South Wales Legislative Assembly representing Balmain for the Greens since 2023. Shetty served as an Inner West Councillor.

Shetty is the daughter of a firefighter. Her career has focused on the banking sector, specialising in fraud-prevention and operations. She resides in Lilyfield with her husband, three children, and their dog Zola.

New South Wales Legislative Assembly
Preceded by Jamie Parker	Member for Balmain; 2023–present	Incumbent
