= John Quirk (politician) =

Australian politician

John Quirk (18 May 1870 – 13 December 1938) was an Australian politician.

Quirk was born at Balmain in Sydney to dairyman John Quirk and Margaret, née McClapperty. After attending St Joseph's School in Rozelle, he joined the Postmaster-General's department in 1886 and began a long-running position at the Balmain post-office. In 1889 he married Sarah Gaillie in Sydney, with whom he had five children. A founder of the Letter Carriers' Union (which became the Postal Workers' Union), he was also a founding member of the Rozelle Labor League in 1893. In 1917 he was elected to the New South Wales Legislative Assembly as the Labor member for Rozelle. With the introduction of proportional representation he became a member for Balmain from 1920 to 1927, when he returned to Rozelle. Rozelle was abolished in 1930 and Quirk moved back to the seat of Balmain. He had married his second wife, Mary Deal, around 1917, and she succeeded him as the Labor MP after he died in 1938.

New South Wales Legislative Assembly
Preceded by James Mercer	Member for Rozelle; 1917–1920	Seat abolished
Preceded by John Storey	Member for Balmain; 1920–1927; With: Storey/Keegan; Doyle/Stopford/Evatt; Stuart-Robertson; Smith/Lane	Succeeded by H. V. Evatt
New seat	Member for Rozelle; 1927–1930	Seat abolished
Preceded by H. V. Evatt	Member for Balmain; 1930–1938	Succeeded by Mary Quirk
