= Albert Smith (New South Wales politician) =

Australian politician

Albert Frank Smith (23 October 1885 – 15 October 1975) was an Australian politician.

He was born at Cundletown to farmer William John Everingham Smith and Margaret Alicia, née Small. He was educated locally and joined the Postmaster-General's department, working as a telegraph messenger at Burraga from 1900 to 1901 and a clerk in the accounts branch from 1901 to 1913. He joined the Australian Imperial Force in 1914 and was severely wounded at Gallipoli, being invalided home. He returned to active service in 1916 but was wounded again in 1917, becoming an instructor of the Signal Engineers' School and aide-de-camp to General Gustave Ramaciotti. After the war he was closely involved with the Returned Serviceman's League and other veterans' groups. In 1920 he was elected to the New South Wales Legislative Assembly as a Nationalist member for Balmain, but he was defeated in 1922. He died in 1975 in Normanhurst.

New South Wales Legislative Assembly
Preceded by John Storey	Member for Balmain; 1920–1922; Served alongside: Doyle, Quirk, Storey/Keegan, Stuart-Robertson	Succeeded by Albert Lane; Robert Stopford
