= Members of the New South Wales Legislative Assembly, 1932–1935 =

Members of the New South Wales Legislative Assembly who served in the 30th parliament held their seats from 1932 to 1935. They were elected at the 1932 state election, and at by-elections. The Speaker was Sir Daniel Levy.

Name	Party	Electorate	Term in office
George Ardill	United Australia	Yass	1930–1941
Jack Baddeley	Labor	Cessnock	1922–1949
Richard Ball	Country	Corowa	1895–1898, 1904–1937
Henry Bate	United Australia	South Coast	1926–1941
Thomas Bavin	United Australia	Gordon	1917–1935
Charles Bennett (Note: Gloucester UAP MLA Walter Bennett died on 16 July 1934. His son, UAP candidate Charles Bennett won the resulting by-election on 25 August.)	United Australia	Gloucester	1934–1941
Walter Bennett	United Australia	Gloucester	1889–1902, 1917–1934
George Booth	Labor	Kurri Kurri	1925–1960
William Brennan (Note: Hamilton Labor MLA Hugh Connell died on 31 January 1934. Labor candidate William Brennan won the resulting by-election on 24 February.)	Labor	Hamilton	1934–1935
Malcolm Brown	Country	Upper Hunter	1931–1939
Michael Bruxner	Country	Tenterfield	1920–1962
Arthur Budd	Country	Byron	1927–1944
Frank Burke	Labor	Newtown	1917–1944
Ernest Buttenshaw	Country	Lachlan	1917–1938
Robert Cameron	Labor	Waratah	1927–1956
Harry Carter	Country	Liverpool Plains	1927–1941
Frank Chaffey	United Australia	Tamworth	1913–1940
Daniel Clyne	Labor	King	1927–1956
Hugh Connell	Labor	Hamilton	1920–1925, 1927–1934
Peter Connolly	Labor	Newcastle	1927–1935
Mat Davidson	Labor	Cobar	1918–1949
Billy Davies	Labor	Illawarra	1917–1949
David Drummond	Country	Armidale	1920–1949
John Dunningham	United Australia	Coogee	1928–1938
Hilton Elliott	Country	Ashburnham	1932–1941
Herbert FitzSimons	United Australia	Lane Cove	1930–1944
Claude Fleck	United Australia	Granville	1932–1938
William Foster	United Australia	Vaucluse	1925–1936
William Frith (Note: Lismore Country MLA William Missingham died on 1 February 1933. Country candidate William Frith won the resulting by-election on 11 March.)	Country	Lismore	1933–1953
George Gollan	United Australia	Parramatta	1932–1953
Bob Gorman (Note: Annandale Labor MLA Robert Stuart-Robertson died on 2 June 1933. Labor candidate Bob Gorman won the resulting by-election on 24 June.)	Labor	Annandale	1933–1950
Robert Hankinson	Country	Murrumbidgee	1932–1941
Horace Harper	United Australia	Arncliffe	1932–1935
William Hedges	Country	Monaro	1927–1941
Robert Heffron	Labor	Botany	1930–1968
Sir Thomas Henley	United Australia	Burwood	1904–1935
Alfred Henry	Country	Clarence	1931–1938
Edward Hocking	United Australia	Canterbury	1932–1935
Ted Horsington	Labor	Sturt	1922–1947
Walter Howarth	United Australia	Maitland	1932–1956
Joseph Jackson	United Australia	Nepean	1922–1956
Milton Jarvie	United Australia	Ashfield	1925–1929, 1929–1935
Tom Keegan	Labor	Glebe	1910–1920, 1921–1935
Matthew Kilpatrick	Country	Wagga Wagga	1920–1941
Hamilton Knight	Labor	Hartley	1927–1947
Joe Lamaro	Labor	Leichhardt	1927–1932, 1932–1934
Jack Lang	Labor	Auburn	1913–1943, 1943–1946
Joe Lawson	Country	Murray	1932–1973
Carlo Lazzarini	Labor	Marrickville	1917–1952
John Lee	United Australia	Drummoyne	1920–1941
Sir Daniel Levy	United Australia	Woollahra	1901–1937
Herbert Lloyd	United Australia	Mosman	1929–1941
Stan Lloyd	United Australia	Concord	1932–1941
Peter Loughlin	United Australia	Goulburn	1917–1927, 1932–1935
Andrew Lysaght (Note: Bulli Labor MLA Andrew Lysaght died on 3 May 1933. Labor candidate John Sweeney won the resulting by-election on 3 June.)	Labor	Bulli	1925–1933
Hugh Main	Country	Temora	1922–1938
Alexander Mair	United Australia	Albury	1932–1946
Lewis Martin	United Australia	Oxley	1927–1941
Claude Matthews (Note: Leichhardt Labor MLA Joe Lamaro resigned to unsuccessfully contest the federal seat of Watson at the 1934 election. Labor candidate Claude Matthews won the resulting by-election on 20 October.)	Labor	Leichhardt	1934–1954
James McGirr	Labor	Bankstown	1922–1952
William McKell	Labor	Redfern	1917–1947
William Missingham	Country	Lismore	1922–1933
Cecil Monro	United Australia	Georges River	1932–1941, 1950–1953
Mark Morton	United Australia	Wollondilly	1901–1920, 1922–1938
Arthur Moverly	United Australia	Randwick	1932–1941
John Ness	United Australia	Dulwich Hill	1927–1938
Barney Olde (Note: Leichhardt Labor MLA Barney Olde died on 22 November 1932. Labor candidate Joe Lamaro won the resulting by-election on 10 December.)	Labor	Leichhardt	1927–1932
Maurice O'Sullivan	Labor	Paddington	1927–1959
Hubert Primrose	United Australia	North Sydney	1932–1941
John Quirk	Labor	Balmain	1917–1938
Albert Reid	Country	Young	1927–1930, 1932–1941
Alfred Reid	United Australia	Manly	1920–1922, 1925–1945
John Reid	Country	Casino	1930–1953
Bill Ross	Country	Cootamundra	1932–1941
James Ross	United Australia	Kogarah	1932–1941
Edward Sanders	United Australia	Willoughby	1925–1943
James Shand	United Australia	Hornsby	1926–1944
Tom Shannon	Labor	Phillip	1927–1954
Colin Sinclair	Country	Namoi	1932–1941
Eric Solomon	United Australia	Petersham	1932–1941
Eric Spooner	United Australia	Ryde	1932–1940
David Spring	United Australia/Country	Mudgee	1932–1935
Fred Stanley	Labor	Lakemba	1927–1950
Bertram Stevens	United Australia	Croydon	1927–1940
Robert Stuart-Robertson	Labor	Annandale	1907–1933
John Sweeney	Labor	Bulli	1933–1947
Norman Thomas	United Australia	Bondi	1932–1941
Alwyn Tonking	United Australia	Orange	1932–1944
Roy Vincent	Country	Raleigh	1922–1953
John Waddell	United Australia	Waverley	1932–1939
Ben Wade	Country	Barwon	1932–1940
Bruce Walker Jr	United Australia	Hawkesbury	1932–1941
Reginald Weaver	United Australia	Neutral Bay	1917–1925, 1927–1945
James Webb	United Australia	Hurstville	1932–1939
Gordon Wilkins	United Australia/Country	Bathurst	1932–1935
George Wilson	Country	Dubbo	1932–1942
Alfred Yeo	Country	Castlereagh	1932–1941

== See also ==
- First Stevens ministry
- Results of the 1932 New South Wales state election
- Candidates of the 1932 New South Wales state election
