= Electoral results for the district of Annandale =

Election results for Annandale, New South Wales, Australia

Annandale, an electoral district of the Legislative Assembly in the Australian state of New South Wales, had two incarnations, the first from 1894 to 1920, the second from 1927 to 1950.

== Members ==
First incarnation (1894–1920)
Election	Member	Party
1894	William Mahony	Free Trade
1895	William Mahony	Free Trade
1898	William Mahony	Free Trade
1901	William Mahony	Liberal Reform
1904	William Mahony	Liberal Reform
1907	William Mahony	Liberal Reform
1910	Albert Bruntnell	Liberal Reform
1913	Arthur Griffith	Labor
1917	William O'Brien	Labor
Second incarnation (1927–1950)
1927	Robert Stuart-Robertson	Labor
1930	Robert Stuart-Robertson	Labor
1931 by	Robert Stuart-Robertson	Labor
1932	Robert Stuart-Robertson	Labor (NSW)
1933 by	Bob Gorman	Labor (NSW)
1935	Bob Gorman	Labor (NSW)
1938	Bob Gorman	Labor / Labor (N-C)
1941	Bob Gorman	Labor
1944	Bob Gorman	Labor
1947	Bob Gorman	Labor

=== Elections in the 1940s ===
==== 1947 ====
1947 New South Wales state election: Annandale
Party	Candidate	Votes	%	±%
Labor	Bob Gorman	11,336	57.4	+1.2
Lang Labor	George Stanley	8,426	42.6	+6.1
Total formal votes		19,762	95.5	+0.8
Informal votes		937	4.5	−0.8
Turnout		20,699	94.8	+3.0
Labor hold		Swing	N/A	

Sitting Labor MP Bob Gorman was returned with an increased majority defeating Lang Labor candidate George Stanley, a first time candidate who never stood again.

==== 1944 ====
1944 New South Wales state election: Annandale
Party	Candidate	Votes	%	±%
Labor	Bob Gorman	10,089	56.2	−19.5
Lang Labor	Ross Pryor	6,558	36.5	+36.5
Independent	Arthur Hagen	1,322	7.4	+7.4
Total formal votes		17,969	94.7	+0.4
Informal votes		1,010	5.3	−0.4
Turnout		18,979	91.8	+1.3
Labor hold		Swing	N/A	

- Preferences were not distributed.

Sitting Labor MP Bob Gorman was returned with a significantly reduced majority defeating Lang Labor candidate Ross Pryor and Independent Arthur Hagen two first time candidates who never stood again.

==== 1941 ====
1941 New South Wales state election: Annandale
Party	Candidate	Votes	%	±%
Labor	Bob Gorman	13,018	75.7	
Independent	Stanley Moran	2,244	13.1	
New Social Order	Harry Blackwell	1,926	11.2	
Total formal votes		17,188	94.3	
Informal votes		1,036	5.7	
Turnout		18,224	90.5	
Labor hold		Swing		

- Preferences were not distributed.

Sitting Labor MP Bob Gorman was returned with an increased majority defeating Independent candidate Stanley Moran who stood as a Communist in the 1932 election in the seat of Glebe and first time New Social Order candidate Harry Blackwell who never stood again.

=== Elections in the 1930s ===
==== 1938 ====
1938 New South Wales state election: Annandale
Party	Candidate	Votes	%	±%
Labor	Bob Gorman	unopposed		
Labor hold				

==== 1935 ====
1935 New South Wales state election: Annandale
Party	Candidate	Votes	%	±%
Labor (NSW)	Bob Gorman	11,075	71.4	+8.3
Federal Labor	John Keegan	4,431	28.6	+22.4
Total formal votes		15,506	95.3	−1.7
Informal votes		767	4.7	+1.7
Turnout		16,273	95.5	−0.1
Labor (NSW) hold		Swing	N/A	

Sitting State Labor MP Bob Gorman was returned with an increased majority defeating John Keegan who stood as the Federal Labor candidate in the 1932 election in the seat of Georges River.

==== 1933 by-election ====
1933 Annandale by-election Saturday 24 June
Party	Candidate	Votes	%	±%
Labor (NSW)	Bob Gorman	9,517	66.34	
Federal Labor	Percival McDonald	3,819	26.62	
Unificationist	Harry Cotter	543	3.79	
Communist	Thomas Wright	466	3.25	
Total formal votes		14,345	95.30	
Informal votes		708	4.70	
Turnout		15,053	86.96	
Labor (NSW) hold		Swing		

The by-election was caused by the death of Robert Stuart-Robertson (Labor (NSW)) on 2 June 1933.

==== 1932 ====
1932 New South Wales state election: Annandale
Party	Candidate	Votes	%	±%
Labor (NSW)	Robert Stuart-Robertson	9,937	63.1	−14.4
United Australia	Leo Bolsdon	4,614	29.3	+9.1
Federal Labor	Percival McDonald	977	6.2	+6.2
Communist	Robert Brechin	175	1.1	−1.2
Independent	Harry Meatheringham	22	0.1	+0.1
Independent	Christopher Hade	13	0.1	+0.1
Total formal votes		15,738	97.0	−0.6
Informal votes		484	3.0	+0.6
Turnout		16,222	95.6	+1.7
Labor (NSW) hold		Swing	N/A	

- Preferences were not distributed.

In 1931, the New South Wales Labor Party split from Federal Labor to form the Australian Labor Party (NSW) led by Jack Lang. In this election, Federal Labor ran candidates in 43 seats but none were elected. Sitting MP Robert Stuart-Robertson was returned with a reduced majority defeating four first time candidates: Leo Bolsdon from the UAP, Communist Robert Brechin, Independent Christopher Hade and the Federal Labor candidate Percival McDonald. Bolsdon and Hade never stood again. He also defeated Independent Harry Meatheringham standing in his sixth and final election.

==== 1931 by-election ====
1931 Annandale by-election 18 April
Party	Candidate	Votes	%	±%
Labor	Robert Stuart-Robertson (re-elected)	8,864	68.44	
Independent	Martha Simpson	3,237	24.99	
Independent	Harry David Meatheringham	428	3.30	
Communist	William John Morrison	423	3.27	
Total formal votes		12,952	93.28	
Informal votes		933	6.72	
Turnout		13,885	80.34 (Note: Estimate based on a roll of 17,245 at the 1930 election.)	
Labor hold		Swing		

The seat was declared vacant on 9 April 1931 because Robert Stuart-Robertson (Labor) had been declared bankrupt.

==== 1930 ====
1930 New South Wales state election: Annandale
Party	Candidate	Votes	%	±%
Labor	Robert Stuart-Robertson	12,246	77.5	
Nationalist	Osterley Thompson	3,194	20.2	
Communist	Mary Lamm	362	2.3	
Total formal votes		15,802	97.6	
Informal votes		383	2.4	
Turnout		16,185	93.9	
Labor hold		Swing		

Sitting Labor MP Robert Stuart-Robertson was returned with a significant increased majority, defeating Nationalist Osterley Thompson and Communist Mary Lamm, two first time candidates who never stood again.

=== Elections in the 1920s ===
==== 1927 ====
1927 New South Wales state election: Annandale
Party	Candidate	Votes	%	±%
Labor	Robert Stuart-Robertson	6,934	56.0	
Nationalist	Edward Hogan	5,454	44.0	
Total formal votes		12,388	99.0	
Informal votes		120	1.0	
Turnout		12,508	82.7	
Labor win		(new seat)		

Sitting Labor MP for Balmain Robert Stuart-Robertson defeated Nationalist Edward Hogan, a first time candidate who did not stand again.

==== 1920 - 1927 ====
District abolished

=== Elections in the 1910s ===
==== 1917 ====
1917 New South Wales state election: Annandale
Party	Candidate	Votes	%	±%
Labor	William O'Brien	3,762	51.0	−3.0
Independent Labor	Arthur Griffith	3,608	49.0	+49.0
Total formal votes		7,370	99.0	+0.8
Informal votes		77	1.0	−0.8
Turnout		7,447	64.7	−9.2
Labor hold		Swing	−3.0	

Sitting member Arthur Griffith was expelled from Labor in the November 1916 Labor split over conscription.

Sitting MP and senior cabinet minister on the Holman government Arthur Griffith had left the Labor Party in the conscription split of 1916 but did not follow William Holman into the Nationalist Party instead becoming an Independent Labor. In the election, Griffith was defeated by William O'Brien, a first time Labor candidate. When the seat was abolished in 1920, O'Brien went onto serve two terms as one of the MPs for Murray.

==== 1913 ====
1913 New South Wales state election: Annandale
Party	Candidate	Votes	%	±%
Labor	Arthur Griffith	4,741	54.0	
Liberal Reform	Albert Bruntnell	3,935	44.8	
Independent	John Strachan	101	1.2	
Total formal votes		8,777	98.2	
Informal votes		161	1.8	
Turnout		8,938	73.9	
Labor gain from Liberal Reform				

This was Strachan's second attempt at running for office. He previously stood as an independent in the 1898 election in the seat of Sydney-Lang. Sitting Liberal Reform MP Albert Bruntnell was defeated by the sitting Labor MP for Sturt, Arthur Griffith.

==== 1910 ====
1910 New South Wales state election: Annandale
Party	Candidate	Votes	%	±%
Liberal Reform	Albert Bruntnell	4,321	51.2	
Labour	George Davidson	4,121	48.8	
Total formal votes		8,442	98.2	
Informal votes		157	1.8	
Turnout		8,599	72.5	
Liberal Reform hold				

The 6-term sitting Liberal Reform MP William Mahony retired and did not contest this election. Former Liberal Reform MP for Surry Hills Albert Bruntnell, who ran for the seat of Alexandria in 1907 and lost, defeated Labor's George Davidson, a first time candidate who did not stand again.

=== Elections in the 1900s ===
==== 1907 ====
1907 New South Wales state election: Annandale
Party	Candidate	Votes	%	±%
Liberal Reform	William Mahony	3,567	54.9	
Independent	Isaiah Cohen	2,933	45.1	
Total formal votes		6,500	97.0	
Informal votes		200	3.0	
Turnout		6,700	69.2	
Liberal Reform hold				

This was Cohen's third and final attempt to win the seat of Annandale, this time standing as an Independent. Sitting Liberal Reform MP William Mahony was returned, for the fifth and final time, with a reduced majority.

==== 1904 ====
1904 New South Wales state election: Annandale
Party	Candidate	Votes	%	±%
Liberal Reform	William Mahony	2,815	60.7	
Progressive	James Robertson	1,826	39.3	
Total formal votes		4,641	99.0	
Informal votes		45	1.0	
Turnout		4,686	57.0	
Liberal Reform hold				

Annandale lost parts of the district to The Glebe and Roxelle. It absorbed parts of Petersham and the abolished seat of Newtown-Camperdown. The member for Annandale was William Mahony (Liberal Reform). The member for Petersham was John Cohen (Liberal Reform) who successfully contested that seat while the member for Newtown-Camperdown was James Smith (Independent Progressive) who successfully contested Camperdown.

This was Robertson's first and only attempt at state office. Sitting Liberal Reform MP William Mahony was returned with an increased majority, achieving over 60 percent of the vote for the first time.

==== 1901 ====
1901 New South Wales state election: Annandale
Party	Candidate	Votes	%	±%
Liberal Reform	William Mahony	1,186	52.1	−0.5
Progressive	Isaiah Cohen	1,076	47.3	0.2
Independent	Richard Kimber	14	0.6	
Total formal votes		2,276	99.5	−0.2
Informal votes		14	0.5	+0.2
Turnout		2,290	61.2	−1.3
Liberal Reform hold				

This was Kimber's first and only attempt at state office, and was Cohen's second of three attempts to win the seat of Annandale. Sitting MP William Mahony, from the newly formed Liberal Reform Party was returned with a slightly reduced majority. The results were subject re-count by the Elections and Qualifications Committee.

=== Elections in the 1890s ===
==== 1898 ====
1898 New South Wales colonial election: Annandale
Party	Candidate	Votes	%	±%
Free Trade	William Mahony	901	52.7	
National Federal	Isaiah Cohen	810	47.3	
Total formal votes		1,711	99.7	
Informal votes		5	0.3	
Turnout		1,716	62.5	
Free Trade hold				

This was Cohen's first of three attempts to win the seat of Annandale. Sitting Free Trade MP William Mahony was returned with a reduced majority.

==== 1895 ====
1895 New South Wales colonial election: Annandale
Party	Candidate	Votes	%	±%
Free Trade	William Mahony	783	58.3	+23.0
Protectionist	John Maxwell	411	30.6	+16.7
Labour	John Skelton	146	10.9	−17.4
Ind. Free Trade	William Williams	4	0.3	
Total formal votes		1,344	98.9	−0.2
Informal votes		15	1.1	+0.2
Turnout		1,359	61.8	−21.9
Free Trade hold				

This was Skelton's second attempt at colonial office, and Maxwell's and Williams' first. All three unsuccessful candidates never stood for election again. Sitting Free Trade MP William Mahony was returned with an increased and absolute majority.

==== 1894 ====
1894 New South Wales colonial election: Annandale
Party	Candidate	Votes	%	±%
Free Trade	William Mahony	657	35.3	
Labour	Alexander Duncan	527	28.3	
Ind. Protectionist	Thomas Larkin	271	14.6	
Protectionist	John Young	259	13.9	
Ind. Free Trade	William Pritchard	149	8.0	
Total formal votes		1,863	99.1	
Informal votes		17	0.9	
Turnout		1,880	83.7	
Free Trade win		(new seat)		

No sitting MPs contested in this election however this was Young's fifth, and Pritchard's fourth election respectively. Neither had held office previously. Duncan and Larkin were running for the first time. All four unsuccessful candidates never stood for election again. This is also Mahony's first attempt for colonial office. He did not achieve an absolute majority but was declared the winner as this election was first-past-the-post.
