= Electoral results for the district of Leichhardt (New South Wales) =

Election results for Leichhardt, New South Wales, Australia

Leichhardt, an electoral district of the Legislative Assembly in the Australian state of New South Wales, had two incarnations, from 1894 to 1920 and from 1927 to 1962.

Election	Member	Party
1894	John Hawthorne	Ind. Free Trade
1895	John Hawthorne	Free Trade
1898	John Hawthorne	Free Trade
1901	John Hawthorne	Liberal Reform
1904	Robert Booth	Liberal Reform
1907	Campbell Carmichael	Labor
1910	Campbell Carmichael	Labor
1913	Campbell Carmichael	Labor
1917	Campbell Carmichael	Labor / Soldiers & Citizens
Election	Member	Party
1927	Barney Olde	Labor
1930	Barney Olde	Labor
1932	Barney Olde	Labor (NSW)
1932 by	Joe Lamaro	Labor (NSW)
1934 by	Claude Matthews	Labor (NSW)
1935	Claude Matthews	Labor (NSW)
1938	Claude Matthews	Labor / Labor (N-C)
1941	Claude Matthews	Labor
1944	Claude Matthews	Labor
1947	Claude Matthews	Labor
1950	Claude Matthews	Labor
1953	Claude Matthews	Labor
1954 by	Reg Coady	Labor
1956	Reg Coady	Labor
1959	Reg Coady	Labor

== Election results ==
=== Elections in the 1950s ===
==== 1959 ====
1959 New South Wales state election: Leichhardt
Party	Candidate	Votes	%	±%
Labor	Reg Coady	12,726	61.6	
Liberal	Barney Morton	7,948	38.4	
Total formal votes		20,674	98.3	
Informal votes		358	1.7	
Turnout		21,032	92.4	
Labor hold		Swing		

==== 1956 ====
1956 New South Wales state election: Leichhardt
Party	Candidate	Votes	%	±%
Labor	Reg Coady	14,145	68.9	−5.6
Liberal	Barney Morton	6,386	31.1	+5.6
Total formal votes		20,531	97.8	+0.5
Informal votes		462	2.2	−0.5
Turnout		20,993	91.7	−0.9
Labor hold		Swing	−5.6	

==== 1954 by-election ====
1954 Leichhardt by-election Saturday 20 March
Party	Candidate	Votes	%	±%
Labor	Reg Coady	12,646	68.14	
Independent	John Blackmore	3,060	16.5	
Independent	William Dougherty	2,533	13.7	
Independent	William McCristal	320	1.7	
Total formal votes		18,559	96.5	
Informal votes		665	3.5	
Turnout		19,224	79.4	
Labor hold		Swing		

- Preferences were not distributed.
- Claude Matthews (Labor) died.

==== 1953 ====
1953 New South Wales state election: Leichhardt
Party	Candidate	Votes	%	±%
Labor	Claude Matthews	16,915	74.5	
Liberal	William Cole	5,794	25.5	
Total formal votes		22,709	97.3	
Informal votes		633	2.7	
Turnout		23,342	92.6	
Labor hold		Swing		

==== 1950 ====
1950 New South Wales state election: Leichhardt
Party	Candidate	Votes	%	±%
Labor	Claude Matthews	13,395	68.3	
Liberal	Charles Shields	5,190	26.5	
Independent	Arthur Doughty	1,016	5.2	
Total formal votes		19,601	97.8	
Informal votes		440	2.2	
Turnout		20,041	93.7	
Two-party-preferred result
Labor	Claude Matthews		70.0 (Note: Two party preferred vote was estimated.)	
Liberal	Charles Shields		30.0	
Labor hold		Swing		

=== Elections in the 1940s ===
==== 1947 ====
1947 New South Wales state election: Leichhardt
Party	Candidate	Votes	%	±%
Labor	Claude Matthews	unopposed		
Labor hold				

==== 1944 ====
1944 New South Wales state election: Leichhardt
Party	Candidate	Votes	%	±%
Labor	Claude Matthews	13,584	72.6	−10.5
Independent Labor	Francis Edgcumbe	2,731	14.6	+14.6
Independent Labor	Charles Shields	2,400	12.8	+12.8
Total formal votes		18,715	94.1	+0.5
Informal votes		1,165	5.9	−0.5
Turnout		19,880	92.4	−0.1
Labor hold		Swing	N/A	

- Preferences were not distributed.

==== 1941 ====
1941 New South Wales state election: Leichhardt
Party	Candidate	Votes	%	±%
Labor	Claude Matthews	14,964	83.1	
State Labor	Anthony Bellanto	3,034	16.9	
Total formal votes		17,998	93.6	
Informal votes		1,230	6.4	
Turnout		19,228	92.5	
Labor hold		Swing		

=== Elections in the 1930s ===
==== 1938 ====
1938 New South Wales state election: Leichhardt
Party	Candidate	Votes	%	±%
Labor	Claude Matthews	9,822	60.5	+3.4
Industrial Labor	James Dunn	3,870	23.8	+23.8
Independent	Arthur Doughty	2,542	15.7	+15.7
Total formal votes		16,234	96.0	−1.7
Informal votes		668	4.0	+1.7
Turnout		16,902	96.5	−1.1
Labor hold		Swing	N/A	

- Preferences were not distributed.

==== 1935 ====
1935 New South Wales state election: Leichhardt
Party	Candidate	Votes	%	±%
Labor (NSW)	Claude Matthews	9,539	57.1	+2.6
Federal Labor	William Dyer	7,175	42.9	+35.3
Total formal votes		16,714	97.7	−0.6
Informal votes		393	2.3	+0.6
Turnout		17,107	97.6	+0.3
Labor (NSW) hold		Swing	N/A	

==== 1934 by-election ====
1934 Leichhardt by-election Saturday 20 October
Party	Candidate	Votes	%	±%
Labor (NSW)	Claude Matthews	9,546	60.0	
Federal Labor	William Dyer	5,616	35.3	
Communist	Robert Brechin	460	2.9	
Independent	Edward Cotter	173	1.1	
Independent	Francis McFadden	109	0.7	
Total formal votes		15,904	97.1	−1.2
Informal votes		479	2.9	+1.2
Turnout		16,383	90.9	−7.0
Labor (NSW) hold		Swing		

- Preferences were not distributed.
- Joe Lamaro, Labor (NSW) resigned.

==== 1932 by-election ====
1932 Leichhardt by-election Saturday 10 December
Party	Candidate	Votes	%	±%
Labor (NSW)	Joe Lamaro	9,401	62.0	
Federal Labor	Robert Storey	5,164	34.1	
Communist	Thomas Payne	313	2.1	
Douglas Credit	William Benjamin	227	1.5	
Independent	Arthur Doughty	51	0.3	
Total formal votes		15,156	96.0	
Informal votes		640	4.1	
Turnout		15,796	93.0	
Labor (NSW) hold		Swing		

- Preferences were not distributed.
- The by-election was triggered by the death of Barney Olde, Labor (NSW).

==== 1932 ====
1932 New South Wales state election: Leichhardt
Party	Candidate	Votes	%	±%
Labor (NSW)	Barney Olde	8,976	54.5	−20.4
United Australia	Andrew Campbell	6,184	37.5	+15.5
Federal Labor	Robert Storey	1,248	7.6	+7.6
Independent	Charles Shields	75	0.5	−0.9
Total formal votes		16,483	98.3	+1.6
Informal votes		284	1.7	−1.6
Turnout		16,767	97.9	+1.6
Labor (NSW) hold		Swing	N/A	

- Preferences were not distributed.

==== 1930 ====
1930 New South Wales state election: Leichhardt
Party	Candidate	Votes	%	±%
Labor	Barney Olde	12,188	74.9	
Nationalist	Thomas Morrow	3,580	22.0	
Independent	Charles Shields	228	1.4	
Independent	Arthur Doughty	190	1.2	
Communist	Jane Mountjoy	90	0.6	
Total formal votes		16,276	96.7	
Informal votes		551	3.3	
Turnout		16,827	96.3	
Labor hold		Swing		

=== Elections in the 1920s ===
==== 1927 ====
1927 New South Wales state election: Leichhardt
Party	Candidate	Votes	%	±%
Labor	Barney Olde	7,136	53.6	
Nationalist	Albert Lane (defeated)	5,912	44.4	
Independent	George Boland	276	2.1	
Total formal votes		13,324	99.0	
Informal votes		138	1.0	
Turnout		13,462	85.7	
Labor win		(new seat)		

District recreated

==== 1920 - 1927 ====
District abolished

=== Elections in the 1910s ===
==== 1917 ====
1917 New South Wales state election: Leichhardt
Party	Candidate	Votes	%	±%
Labor	Campbell Carmichael	unopposed		
Labor hold				

==== 1913 ====
1913 New South Wales state election: Leichhardt
Party	Candidate	Votes	%	±%
Labor	Campbell Carmichael	4,918	57.0	
Liberal Reform	Henry Brierley	3,584	41.5	
Australasian Socialist	John Kilburn	127	1.5	
Total formal votes		8,629	98.3	
Informal votes		153	1.7	
Turnout		8,782	71.7	
Labor hold				

==== 1910 ====
1910 New South Wales state election: Leichhardt
Party	Candidate	Votes	%	±%
Labour	Campbell Carmichael	5,462	55.9	
Liberal Reform	Frederick Reed	4,305	44.1	
Total formal votes		9,967	99.1	
Informal votes		91	0.9	
Turnout		9,858	78.5	
Labour hold				

=== Elections in the 1900s ===
==== 1907 ====
1907 New South Wales state election: Leichhardt
Party	Candidate	Votes	%	±%
Labour	Campbell Carmichael	3,554	44.2	
Liberal Reform	Robert Booth	3,069	38.1	
Independent Liberal	John Hawthorne	1,425	17.7	
Total formal votes		8,048	97.9	
Informal votes		176	2.1	
Turnout		8,224	79.6	
Labour gain from Liberal Reform				

==== 1904 ====
1904 New South Wales state election: Leichhardt
Party	Candidate	Votes	%	±%
Liberal Reform	Robert Booth	2,370	39.0	
Independent Liberal	John Hawthorne	1,980	32.6	
Labour	George Beeby	1,722	28.4	
Total formal votes		6,072	99.5	
Informal votes		28	0.5	
Turnout		6,100	70.5	
Liberal Reform hold				

Leichhardt was not significantly changed. John Hawthorne had been the Liberal Reform member for Leichhardt for 10 years, however stood as an Independent Liberal Reform Candidate, having been denied pre-selection in favour of Robert Booth, who had the support of the United Protestant Defence Association due to Hawthorne voting to grant money to various charities which included a Catholic orphanage.

==== 1901 ====
1901 New South Wales state election: Leichhardt
Party	Candidate	Votes	%	±%
Liberal Reform	John Hawthorne	1,475	67.4	+18.6
Labour	William Niland	715	32.7	+8.4
Total formal votes		2,190	99.5	−0.3
Informal votes		12	0.5	+0.3
Turnout		2,202	58.4	−5.6
Liberal Reform hold				

=== Elections in the 1890s ===
==== 1898 ====
1898 New South Wales colonial election: Leichhardt
Party	Candidate	Votes	%	±%
Free Trade	John Hawthorne	960	48.8	
National Federal	Richard Colonna-Close	530	26.9	
Labour	George Clark	478	24.3	
Total formal votes		1,968	99.8	
Informal votes		4	0.2	
Turnout		1,972	64.1	
Free Trade hold				

==== 1895 ====
1895 New South Wales colonial election: Leichhardt
Party	Candidate	Votes	%	±%
Free Trade	John Hawthorne	990	57.7	
Labour	John Dobbie	727	42.3	
Total formal votes		1,717	99.5	
Informal votes		9	0.5	
Turnout		1,726	65.8	
Free Trade hold				

==== 1894 ====
1894 New South Wales colonial election: Leichhardt
Party	Candidate	Votes	%	±%
Ind. Free Trade	John Hawthorne	826	37.1	
Labour	William Holman	731	32.8	
Free Trade	George Clark	372	16.7	
Ind. Free Trade	Robert Cropley	159	7.1	
Protectionist	Edward Purnell	95	4.3	
Ind. Free Trade	Edward Darnley	34	1.5	
Ind. Protectionist	Aaron Wheeler	11	0.5	
Total formal votes		2,228	99.1	
Informal votes		21	0.9	
Turnout		2,249	83.5	
Ind. Free Trade win		(new seat)		
