= Candidates of the 1932 New South Wales state election =

This is a list of candidates for the 1932 New South Wales state election. The election was held on 11 June 1932.

== Retiring Members ==
=== Labor ===
- Bill Ratcliffe (Barwon)

=== United Australia ===
- Richard Arthur (Mosman)
- Bruce Walker Sr (Hawkesbury)

== Legislative Assembly ==
Sitting members are shown in bold text. Successful candidates are highlighted in the relevant colour. Where there is possible confusion, an asterisk (*) is also used.

Electorate	Held by	Labor candidate	Coalition candidate	Fed. Labor candidate	Other candidates
Albury	Labor	**Joseph Fitzgerald**	Alexander Mair (UAP)		
Albury	Labor	**Joseph Fitzgerald**	John Ross (CP)		
Annandale	Labor	**Robert Stuart-Robertson**	Leo Bolsdon (UAP)	Percival McDonald	Robert Brechin (CPA); Christopher Hade (Ind); Harry Meatheringham (Ind)
Armidale	Country	Leonard Dawson	**David Drummond** (CP)		
Arncliffe	Labor	**Joseph Cahill**	Horace Harper (UAP)	Patrick Coyne	Fred Farrall (CPA)
Ashburnham	Labor	**William Keast**	Hilton Elliott (CP)		Edmund Best (Ind UAP)
Ashburnham	Labor	**William Keast**	Eric Pryor (UAP)		Edmund Best (Ind UAP)
Ashfield	United Australia	Lancelot Stevenson	**Milton Jarvie** (UAP)		
Auburn	Labor	**Jack Lang**	Phillip Wilkins (UAP)	Percy Coleman	Theodore McLennan (Ind); Lance Sharkey (CPA)
Balmain	Labor	**John Quirk**		Peter Murray	Arthur Arundel (Ind); Joseph Crow (CPA)
Bankstown	Labor	**James McGirr**	John Byrne (UAP)	John Metcalfe	Jacob Cook (Ind UAP); Michael Ryan (CPA)
Barwon	Labor	Edward Cummins	Ben Wade (CP)	Lou Cunningham	
Bathurst	Labor	**Gus Kelly**	Gordon Wilkins (UAP-CP)		Eric Ingram (Ind); John Miller (Ind)
Bondi	Labor	**Abe Landa**	Norman Thomas (UAP)	James Buckingham	Grace Scobie (Ind); Archibald Smith (CPA)
Botany	Labor	**Bob Heffron**	Trevor Levy (UAP)	Frederick Kerr	Basil Williams (CPA)
Bulli	Labor	**Andrew Lysaght**	Robert Roberts (UAP)	Allan Howie	Evred Bostick (CPA)
Burwood	United Australia	Horace Foley	**Sir Thomas Henley** (UAP)		Abraham Taylor (Ind)
Byron	Country	Frederick Crowther	**Arthur Budd** (CP)		
Canterbury	Labor	**Arthur Tonge**	Edward Hocking (UAP)	George Bramston	Robert Cram (CPA)
Casino	Country	Jim Fredericks	**John Reid** (CP)		
Casino	Country	Jim Fredericks	Henry McLaurin (CP)		
Castlereagh	Labor	**Joseph Clark**	Alfred Yeo (CP)	Wilfred Turnbull	
Cessnock	Labor	**Jack Baddeley**		Joseph Norton	Henry Scanlon (CPA)
Clarence	Country		**Alfred Henry** (CP)		
Cobar	Labor	**Mat Davidson**	Eric Killen (CP)	Samuel Bailey	
Concord	Labor	**Henry McDicken**	Stan Lloyd (UAP)		Robert Thomson (CPA)
Coogee	United Australia	Alphonsus Ticehurst	**John Dunningham** (UAP)		Jessa Burns (CPA); Mark Cochrane (Ind)
Cootamundra	Labor	**Ken Hoad**	Bill Ross (CP)	Thomas Lavelle	
Corowa	United Australia	Patrick Quilty	**Richard Ball*** (CP)		
Corowa	United Australia	Patrick Quilty	Sydney Creed (CP)		
Croydon	United Australia	John Eldridge	**Bertram Stevens** (UAP)		
Drummoyne	Labor	**David McLelland**	John Lee (UAP)	Algernon Lindsay	Bernard Burns (CPA); Ruby Duncan (Ind); William Udall (Ind UAP)
Dubbo	Labor	**Alfred McClelland**	George Wilson (CP)	Harry O'Shea	
Dubbo	Labor	**Alfred McClelland**	John Macdonald (UAP)	Harry O'Shea	
Dulwich Hill	Labor	**Frank Connors**	John Ness (UAP)	William Long	Francis Pascoe (Ind UAP)
George's River	Labor	**Ted Kinsella**	Cecil Monro (UAP)	John Keegan	Patrick Drew (CPA)
Glebe	Labor	**Tom Keegan**	William Nicol (UAP)	Northey Du Maurier	Stan Moran (CPA)
Gloucester	United Australia	William Campbell	**Walter Bennett** (UAP)		William Flannery (Ind); William Hawdon (Ind CP)
Gordon	United Australia	George Smart	**Thomas Bavin** (UAP)		
Goulburn	Labor	**Jack Tully**	Peter Loughlin (UAP)		
Goulburn	Labor	**Jack Tully**	Jack Garry (CP)		
Granville	Labor	**Bill Ely**	Claude Fleck (UAP)	James Brophy	Raymond Hall (CPA); James Harwood (Ind)
Hamilton	Labor	**Hugh Connell**			Robert Anderson (Ind); Harold O'Neill (AAL); Gordon Skelton (Ind); William Townsend (CPA)
Hartley	Labor	**Hamilton Knight**	Horace Bracey (UAP-CP)		James Dooley (Ind Lab); Patrick Walsh (CPA)
Hawkesbury	United Australia	Henry Taverner	Bruce Walker Jr (UAP)		Albert Taylor (Ind CP); Robert Wood (Ind CP)
Hornsby	United Australia	Charles Hankin	**James Shand** (UAP)		
Hurstville	Labor	**Walter Butler**	James Webb (UAP)	Gertrude Melville	James Stubbs (CPA)
Illawarra	Labor	**Billy Davies**	Patrick Cantwell (UAP)	Mont Sheppard	William Blake (CPA); John Scarlett (Ind)
King	Labor	**Daniel Clyne**	Henry Manning (UAP)	Edgar Grover	Ted Tripp (CPA)
Kogarah	Labor	**Mark Gosling**	James Ross (UAP)	Robert Beaton	Philip Coyle (Ind); Arthur Smith (CPA)
Kurri Kurri	Labor	**George Booth**			Harris Burnham (CPA)
Lachlan	Country	John Heiss	**Ernest Buttenshaw** (CP)	David Nilon	Philip Bolte (Ind CP)
Lakemba	Labor	**Fred Stanley**	Robert Uebel (UAP)	John McCallum	John Terry (CPA)
Lane Cove	United Australia	Jack Fitzpatrick	**Herbert FitzSimons** (UAP)		
Leichhardt	Labor	**Barney Olde**	Andrew Campbell (UAP)	Robert Storey	Charles Shields (Ind)
Lismore	Country	Charles Taylor	**William Missingham** (CP)		
Liverpool Plains	Country	Elijah Smith	**Harry Carter** (CP)		
Maitland	Labor	**Walter O'Hearn**	Walter Howarth* (UAP)		James Heatherill (CPA)
Maitland	Labor	**Walter O'Hearn**	Alexander McDonald (CP)		James Heatherill (CPA)
Manly	United Australia		**Alfred Reid** (UAP)		Clarence Pullen (Ind)
Marrickville	Labor	**Carlo Lazzarini**	Herbert Donald (UAP)	Thomas Melody	John Loughran (CPA); Frank Wright (Ind UAP)
Monaro	Country	James Bollard	**William Hedges** (CP)	John Cusack	Douglas Norris (Ind)
Mosman	United Australia	William Thomason	Herbert Lloyd (UAP)		
Mudgee	Labor	**Bill Dunn**	David Spring (UAP-CP)		James Terry (CPA)
Murray	Labor	**John Donovan**	Joe Lawson (CP)		
Murray	Labor	**John Donovan**	John Dowling (UAP)		
Murrumbidgee	Labor	**Martin Flannery**	Robert Hankinson* (CP)	Ernest Parkin	
Murrumbidgee	Labor	**Martin Flannery**	Michael Gleeson (CP)	Ernest Parkin	
Namoi	Labor	**William Scully**	Colin Sinclair (CP)		Ernest Bachelor (Ind)
Nepean	United Australia		**Joseph Jackson** (UAP)		Thomas Moon (CPA)
Neutral Bay	United Australia	William McMullen	**Reginald Weaver** (UAP)		
Newcastle	Labor	**Peter Connolly**	Charles Parker (UAP)	Hugh Sutherland	Catherine Barratt (CPA); Clarence Martin (Ind); Elizabeth Robinson (Ind)
Newtown	Labor	**Frank Burke**	Robert Williams (UAP)	Albert Clifton	Henry Dawson (Ind); Jack Kavanagh (CPA)
North Sydney	Labor	**Ben Howe**	Hubert Primrose (UAP)	Cecil Murphy	Edward Clark (Ind); Lucy Gullett (Ind)
Orange	Labor	**William Folster**	Alwyn Tonking (UAP)		
Orange	Labor	**William Folster**	Frederic Hinton (CP)		
Oxley	United Australia	Joseph Cooper	**Lewis Martin** (UAP)		
Paddington	Labor	**Maurice O'Sullivan**	Frank Graham (UAP)	George Laughlan	George Fleming (CPA); Alfred Webb (Ind UAP)
Parramatta	Labor	**Joseph Byrne**	George Gollan (UAP)	Albert Rowe	Frederick Bateman (CPA); George Mobbs (Ind)
Petersham	Labor	**Joe Lamaro**	Eric Solomon (UAP)	Patrick Colbourne	Edgar Vale (Ind)
Phillip	Labor	**Tom Shannon**	William Adkins (UAP)	Ronald Wyllie	Edward Docker (CPA)
Raleigh	Country	David Walker	**Roy Vincent** (CP)		
Randwick	Labor	**Jack Flanagan**	Arthur Moverly (UAP)	Francis Pollard	
Redfern	Labor	**William McKell**	John Wright (UAP)	Harold Sutton	Jean Thomson-Marsh (CPA)
Ryde	Labor	**Evan Davies**	Eric Spooner (UAP)	May Matthews	Richard Barron (CPA)
South Coast	United Australia	John Dooley	**Henry Bate** (UAP)		
Sturt	Labor	**Ted Horsington**			Frederick Miller (CPA)
Tamworth	United Australia	Thomas Normoyle	**Frank Chaffey** (UAP)		James Brownhill (Ind CP); James Neale (Ind)
Temora	Country	Essell Hoad	**Hugh Main** (CP)		James King (Ind Lab)
Tenterfield	Country		**Michael Bruxner** (CP)		
Upper Hunter	Country	Joseph Shakespeare	**Malcolm Brown** (CP)		Arie Dorsman (Ind)
Vaucluse	United Australia		**William Foster** (UAP)		
Wagga Wagga	Country	Kenneth Campbell	**Matthew Kilpatrick** (CP)		
Waratah	Labor	**Robert Cameron**	Arthur Griffiths (UAP-CP)	Arthur Griffith	Sidney Bethune (CPA)
Waverley	Labor	**William Clementson**	John Waddell (UAP)	Albert Gardiner	Esmonde Higgins (CPA)
Willoughby	United Australia	Richard Lynch	**Edward Sanders** (UAP)		
Wollondilly	United Australia	John Cleary	**Mark Morton** (UAP)	Patrick Kenna	
Woollahra	United Australia	Robert Stapleton	**Sir Daniel Levy** (UAP)		
Yass	United Australia	Reginald O'Brien	**George Ardill** (UAP)		
Young	Labor	**Clarrie Martin**	Albert Reid (CP)		
Young	Labor	**Clarrie Martin**	Mark Whitby (CP)		

== See also ==
- Members of the New South Wales Legislative Assembly, 1932–1935
