= 1931 Annandale state by-election =

Election result for Annandale, New South Wales, Australia

The 1931 Annandale state by-election was held on 18 April 1931 for the New South Wales Legislative Assembly electorate of Annandale because the seat of Robert Stuart-Robertson (Labor) was declared vacant on 9 April 1931 as he had been declared bankrupt.

Stuart-Robertson re-contested and was returned with a reduced majority. There was some controversy over using Anzac Day for the by-election. He defeated the Independent candidate Harry Meatheringham who had contested four previous elections in the seats of Auburn, North Shore and North Sydney, as well as Communist William Morrison and another Independent Martha Simpson, two first time candidates who never stood again.

== Results ==
1931 Annandale by-election 18 April
Party	Candidate	Votes	%	±%
Labor	Robert Stuart-Robertson (re-elected)	8,864	68.44	
Independent	Martha Simpson	3,237	24.99	
Independent	Harry David Meatheringham	428	3.30	
Communist	William John Morrison	423	3.27	
Total formal votes		12,952	93.28	
Informal votes		933	6.72	
Turnout		13,885	80.34 (Note: Estimate based on a roll of 17,245 at the 1930 election.)	
Labor hold		Swing		

== See also ==
- Electoral results for the district of Annandale
- List of New South Wales state by-elections
