= 1954 Leichhardt state by-election =

Election result for Leichhardt, New South Wales, Australia

A by-election was held for the New South Wales Legislative Assembly electorate of Leichhardt on 9 July 1954 because of the death of Claude Matthews (Labor) who committed suicide while still in office. He had been receiving treatment for a "nervous condition" for 18 months.

== Dates ==
Date	Event
9 January 1954	Claude Matthews died.
23 February 1954	Writ of election issued by the Speaker of the Legislative Assembly.
3 March 1954	Day of nomination
20 March 1954	Polling day
5 April 1954	Return of writ

== Result ==
1954 Leichhardt by-election Saturday 20 March
Party	Candidate	Votes	%	±%
Labor	Reg Coady	12,646	68.14	
Independent	John Blackmore	3,060	16.5	
Independent	William Dougherty	2,533	13.7	
Independent	William McCristal	320	1.7	
Total formal votes		18,559	96.5	
Informal votes		665	3.5	
Turnout		19,224	79.4	
Labor hold		Swing		

- Preferences were not distributed.

== See also ==
- Electoral results for the district of Leichhardt (New South Wales)
- List of New South Wales state by-elections
