= 1934 Leichhardt state by-election =

Election result for Leichhardt, New South Wales, Australia

A by-election was held for the New South Wales Legislative Assembly electorate of Leichhardt on 10 December 1934 because of the resignation of Joe Lamaro, Labor (NSW), to contest the federal seat of Watson at the 1934 election, however he was unsuccessful.

== Dates ==
Date	Event
8 August 1934	Joe Lamaro resigned.
15 September 1934	Australian federal election
2 October 1934	Writ of election issued by the Speaker of the Legislative Assembly.
9 October 1934	Day of nomination
20 October 1934	Polling day
3 November 1934	Return of writ

== Result ==
1934 Leichhardt by-election Saturday 20 October
Party	Candidate	Votes	%	±%
Labor (NSW)	Claude Matthews	9,546	60.0	
Federal Labor	William Dyer	5,616	35.3	
Communist	Robert Brechin	460	2.9	
Independent	Edward Cotter	173	1.1	
Independent	Francis McFadden	109	0.7	
Total formal votes		15,904	97.1	−1.2
Informal votes		479	2.9	+1.2
Turnout		16,383	90.9	−7.0
Labor (NSW) hold		Swing		

- Preferences were not distributed.

== See also ==
- Electoral results for the district of Leichhardt (New South Wales)
- List of New South Wales state by-elections
