= 1932 Leichhardt state by-election =

Election result for Leichhardt, New South Wales, Australia

A by-election was held for the New South Wales Legislative Assembly electorate of Leichhardt on 10 December 1932 because of the death of Barney Olde, Labor (NSW).

== Dates ==
Date	Event
20 November 1932	Barney Olde died.
24 November 1932	Writ of election issued by the Speaker of the Legislative Assembly.
30 November 1932	Day of nomination
10 December 1932	Polling day
22 December 1932	Return of writ

== Result ==
1932 Leichhardt by-election Saturday 10 December
Party	Candidate	Votes	%	±%
Labor (NSW)	Joe Lamaro	9,401	62.0	
Federal Labor	Robert Storey	5,164	34.1	
Communist	Thomas Payne	313	2.1	
Douglas Credit	William Benjamin	227	1.5	
Independent	Arthur Doughty	51	0.3	
Total formal votes		15,156	96.0	
Informal votes		640	4.1	
Turnout		15,796	93.0	
Labor (NSW) hold		Swing		

- Preferences were not distributed.

== See also ==
- Electoral results for the district of Leichhardt (New South Wales)
- List of New South Wales state by-elections
