= Amy Rowntree =

Tasmanian educationist (1885–1962)

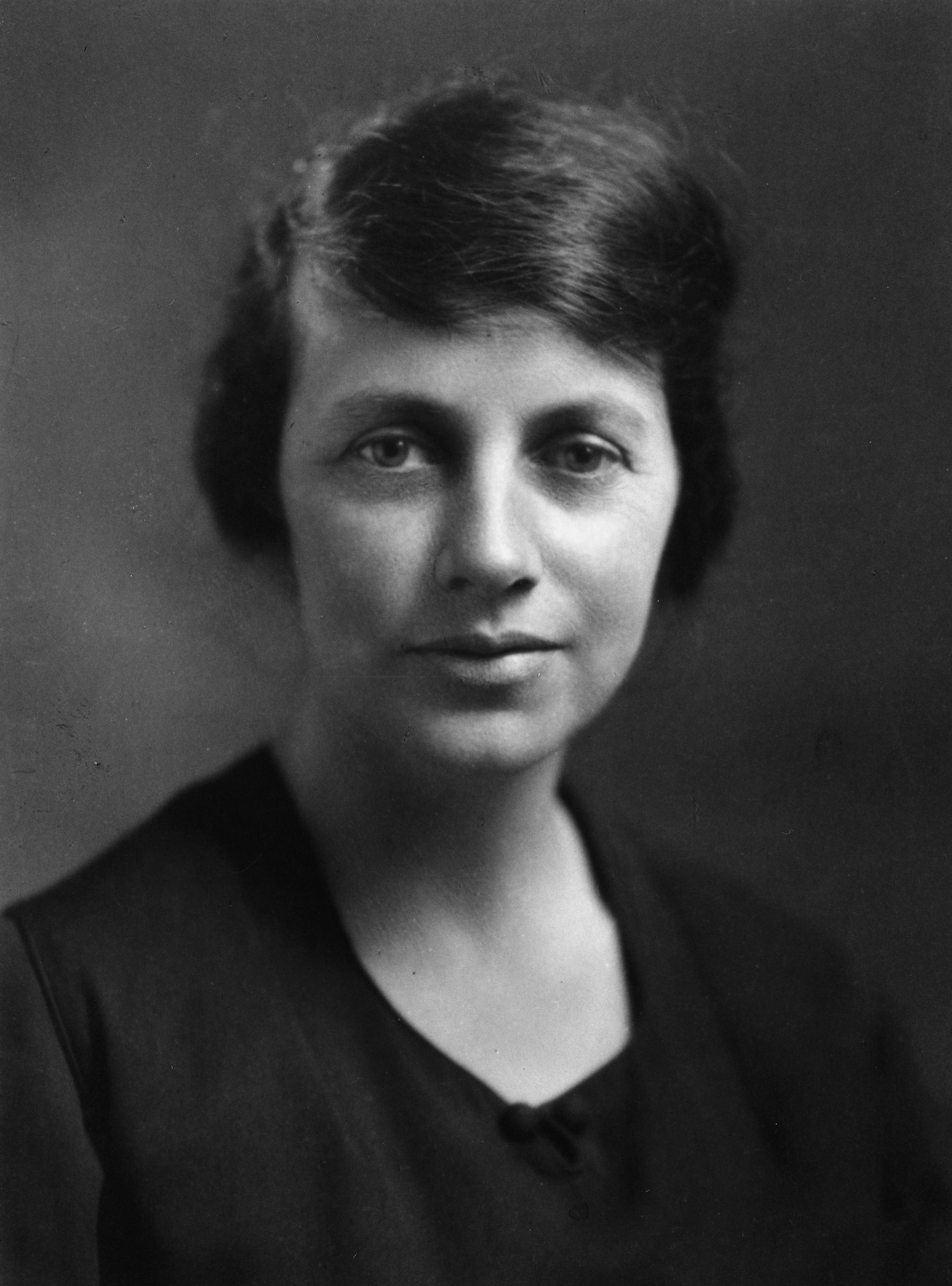
- Rowntree, c. 1925
- Born: 13 July 1885; Hobart, Tasmania, Australia
- Died: 4 March 1962 (aged 76); Battery Point, Tasmania, Australia
- Occupations: teacher and educationalist
- Known for: introduced kindergarten techniques to Tasmania

Amy Rowntree OBE (13 July 1885 – 4 March 1962) was a Tasmanian educationist who introduced kindergarten techniques to Tasmania. She was also a writer and she and two of her sisters founded Nattyna Heritage Museum in 1957.

== Life ==
Rowntree was born in the Tasmanian capital of Hobart. Her parents were Ann Maria (born Fearnley) and Francis Rowntree who was an engineer. She was one of eight children and her brother Edward Fearnley Rowntree was a notable pilot and engineer.

In 1912, the New South Wales government had sent Martha Simpson to Europe to learn about the Montessori Method of education from Maria Montessori. These principles were practiced at the demonstration school and in 1912 to 1913 Rowntree was at Teachers' College, Sydney learning from Simpson.

The Elizabeth Street Practising School was in Tasmania and in 1919 she became the "mistress of method" of the school looking after infant teaching and she became Tasmania's first Inspector of Infant Schools. In the same year she graduated from the University of Tasmania and two years later she was awarded a master's degree. Rowntree was a role model for aspiring professional women. She said that she gave up some the "joys of womanhood" but she also experienced travel to Europe and North America as part of her career. She retired in 1945 and in 1949 she was appointed an Officer of the Order of the British Empire.

In retirement she took an interest in local history and she wrote eight books. In 1957 the Nattyna Heritage Museum opened and she and two of her sisters, Fearn and Milli were the main people who inspired its creation. Amy became ill in 1961 and after her death in 1962 her sister (and her illustrator) Fearn helped her last books to be published. Rowntree had died in Battery Point in 1962.
