= 1933 Annandale state by-election =

Election result for Annandale, New South Wales, Australia

A by-election was held for the New South Wales Legislative Assembly electorate of Annandale on 24 June 1933 following the death of sitting member, Robert Stuart-Robertson (Labor (NSW)).

== Candidates ==
- Harry Cotter standing as a Labor Party Unificationist was a first time candidate who never stood again.
- Bob Gorman was a first time state Labor candidate.
- Percival McDonald (Federal Labor) was standing in his second and final election.
- Thomas Wright (Communist) who stood previously stood as a Communist in the 1930 election in the seat of Kogarah.

== Results ==
1933 Annandale by-election Saturday 24 June
| Party | Candidate | Votes | % | ±% |
|---|---|---|---|---|
| Labor (NSW) | Bob Gorman | 9,517 | 66.34 | |
| Federal Labor | Percival McDonald | 3,819 | 26.62 | |
| Unificationist | Harry Cotter | 543 | 3.79 | |
| Communist | Thomas Wright | 466 | 3.25 | |
| Total formal votes | | 14,345 | 95.30 | |
| Informal votes | | 708 | 4.70 | |
| Turnout | | 15,053 | 86.96 | |
| Labor (NSW) hold | | Swing | | |

== See also ==
- Electoral results for the district of Annandale
- List of New South Wales state by-elections
