= John McCallum (Australian politician) =

Australian politician

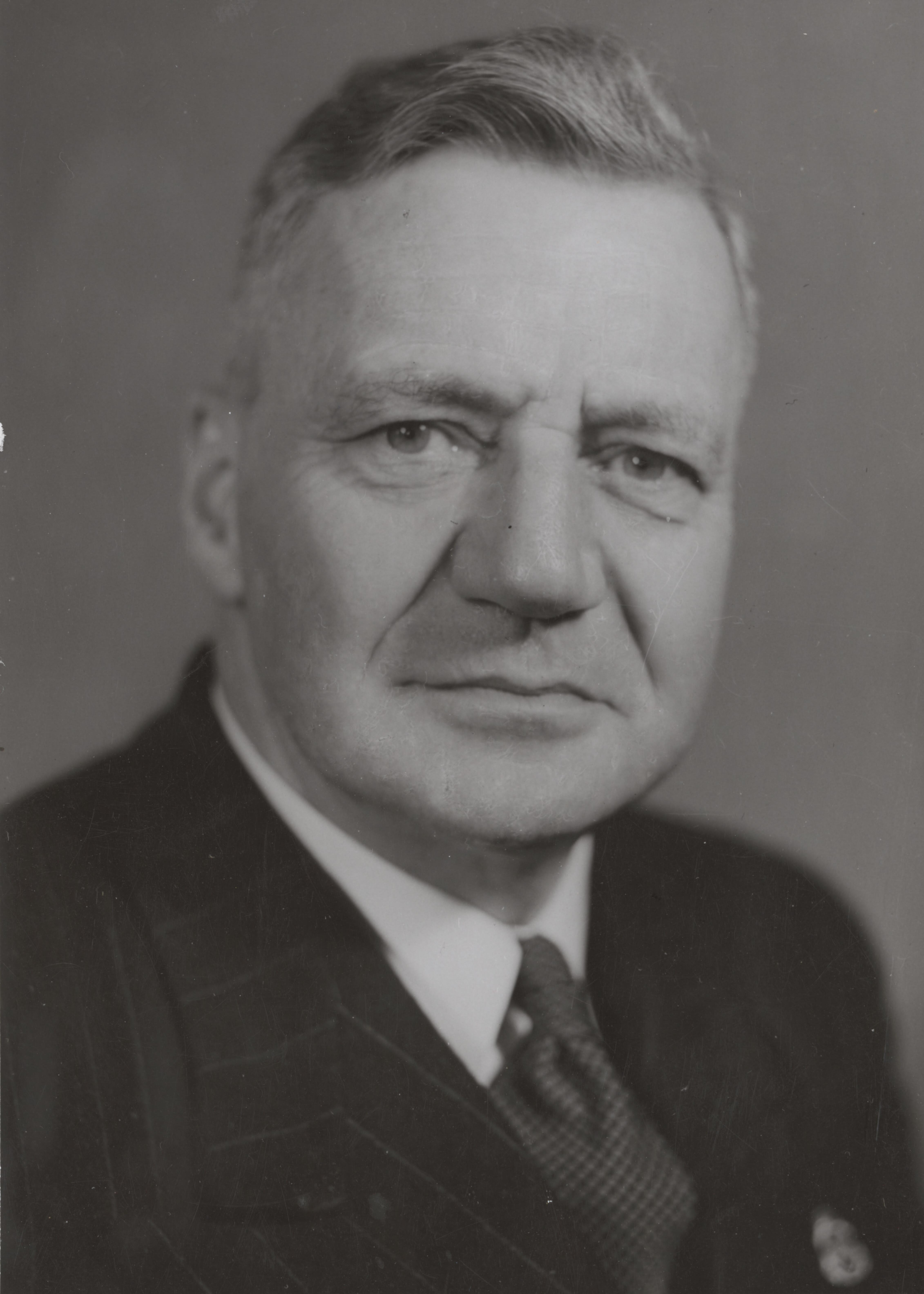

Senator for New South Wales
- In office 22 February 1950 – 30 June 1962

Personal details
- Born: 31 July 1892 Mittagong, New South Wales, Australia
- Died: 30 December 1973 (aged 81) Lindfield, New South Wales, Australia
- Party: Liberal Party of Australia
- Occupation: Teacher, lecturer

John Archibald McCallum (31 July 1892 – 30 December 1973) was an Australian politician who served as a Senator for New South Wales from 1950 until 1962.

== Early life ==
McCallum was born in Mittagong, New South Wales, the son of Welsh-born Catherine Margaret, née Protheroe (1857–?) and her husband Scottish coach builder Archibald Duncan McCallum (1857–1939). He was educated at Sydney High School and Sydney Teachers College, teaching at Parramatta High School before enlisting in the Australian Imperial Force in September 1915, serving in Egypt, France and Belgium.

He was injured in the Battle of Polygon Wood in September 1917. He was wounded in the right leg and was subsequently discharged. Upon his return he studied history at the University of Sydney under George Arnold Wood, where he attained first class honours and the university medal in 1921.

He returned to teaching history and economics, a member of the Teachers' Federation and was active in the Workers' Educational Association, contributing to its journal Australian Highway.

He was a director of the Australian Institute of Political Science, contributing to its journal, Australian Quarterly and representing it as an observer at the Asian Relations Conference in New Delhi in 1947. He also contributed to New Outlook and appeared on The World We Live in, a schools programme on the ABC.

== Politics ==
McCallum came to oppose Jack Lang describing Lang as a despot and the state branch as subject to Lang's "complete and arbitrary authority'. Following the Labor split in 1931 he become president of the federal Labor Party. The party's best result was the 1931 federal election, achieving 16.8% of the primary vote in NSW and winning 3 of the 28 NSW seats in the House of Representatives. At the 1932 NSW state election McCallum was an unsuccessful candidate for Lakemba and at the 1934 federal election McCallum was an unsuccessful candidate for Martin. He was disaffected by the 1936 Labor unity conference, declaring that Labor had sold out to the rebels. He was further dissatisfied with Labor's isolationism at the 1937 state conference and left the party.

He was a foundation member of the Liberal Party in 1944 and was the third candidate on the coalition ticket for NSW for the Australian Senate at the 1949 federal election and was re-elected in 1951 and 1955. For the 1961 election he was defeated by Eileen Furley for the third spot on the coalition's senate ticket, and McCallum retired at the end of his term in 1962.

== Family ==
He married Eda Lockwood, a school teacher, on 17 December 1921 and they would have four children, Douglas McCrae, Barbara, Wallace Lincoln and Jacqueline Mary. They separated in 1932 and divorced in 1938. He married a second time 27 November 1940 to Edith Ellen Ernestina Fay, also a school teacher. Edith had been a student of McCallum when he was deputy headmaster at Grafton High School from 1929 to 1931. They had no children and divorced in 1954.

McCallum died in 1973 (aged 81) at his home in Lindfield, New South Wales.
