= Reg Coady =

Australian politician

Personal details
- Born: 28 May 1918 Forest Lodge, Sydney
- Died: 13 May 1977 (aged 58) Sydney
- Party: Labor Party

Reginald John Francis Coady (28 May 1918 – 13 May 1977) was an Australian politician and a member of the New South Wales Legislative Assembly from 1954 until 1973. He was a member of the Labor Party (ALP).

Coady was born in Forest Lodge and was the son of a carter. He was educated at Patrician Brothers High School, Forest Lodge and qualified as a book-keeper, eventually becoming the chief clerk for Tooheys Brewery. He was an official on the Federated Clerks' Union and became involved in community organisations in the Glebe area including the Saint Vincent de Paul Society and the Australian Red Cross.

Coady was elected to the parliament as the Labor member for Leichhardt at the 1954 by-election caused by the suicide of the incumbent Labor member and ex-minister Claude Matthews. Coady held the seat for the next 3 elections until the seat was abolished and he contested the seat of Drummoyne at the 1962 election, defeating the sitting Liberal member Walter Lawrence. He retained the seat until his retirement at the 1973 election. Coady spent his entire 19-year career as a backbencher, and never held party or parliamentary office. However his victory over his 1968 Liberal opponent John Howard did set the pathway for Howard eventually becoming Prime Minister of Australia in 1996–2007.

Coady died in Sydney on 13 May 1977 (aged 58).

New South Wales Legislative Assembly
Preceded by Claude Matthews	Member for Leichhardt; 1954–1962	Succeeded by seat abolished
Preceded by Walter Lawrence	Member for Drummoyne; 1962–1973	Succeeded by Michael Maher
