= 1934 Australian House of Representatives election =

Australian federal election, 15 September 1934 House of Representatives << 1931–1937 >>
Enrolled voters	3,902,677				
Votes cast	3,677,723		Turnout	95.17	+0.13
Informal votes	126,338		Informal	3.44	–0.04
Summary of votes by party
Party	Primary votes	%	Swing	Seats	Change
United Australia	1,170,978	32.97%	–3.13%	28	– 6
Labor	952,251	26.81%	–0.28%	18	+ 4
Labor (NSW)	510,480	14.37%	+3.80%	9	+ 5
Country	447,968	12.61%	+0.36%	14	– 2
Social Credit	166,589	4.69%	+4.69%	0	± 0
Liberal and Country	142,583	4.01%	+4.01%	5	+ 5
Communist	47,499	1.34%	+1.34%	0	± 0
Independent	113,037	3.18%	–2.82%	0	– 1
Total	3,551,385			74	

This is a list of electoral division results for the Australian 1934 federal election.

== New South Wales ==
=== Barton ===
1934 Australian federal election: Barton
Party	Candidate	Votes	%	±%
United Australia	Albert Lane	24,344	46.4	−1.3
Labor (NSW)	John Eldridge	18,450	35.1	+1.7
Social Credit	John Macara	5,824	11.1	+11.1
Labor	Albert Willis	2,499	4.8	−14.2
Communist	Pat Drew	1,405	2.7	+2.7
Total formal votes		52,522	96.3	
Informal votes		2,024	3.7	
Turnout		54,546	98.1	
Two-party-preferred result
United Australia	Albert Lane	27,014	51.4	−2.6
Labor (NSW)	John Eldridge	25,508	48.6	+2.6
United Australia hold		Swing	−2.6	

=== Calare ===
1934 Australian federal election: Calare
Party	Candidate	Votes	%	±%
Labor (NSW)	William Keast	18,399	37.4	+12.2
Country	Harold Thorby	17,324	35.2	−20.0
United Australia	Lewis Nott	8,672	17.6	+17.6
Labor	Reginald Phillips	3,094	6.3	−13.3
Social Credit	Ethel Arthur-Smith	1,664	3.4	+3.4
Total formal votes		49,153	96.3	
Informal votes		1,891	3.7	
Turnout		51,044	95.9	
Two-party-preferred result
Country	Harold Thorby	26,521	54.0	−6.1
Labor (NSW)	William Keast	22,632	46.0	+6.1
Country hold		Swing	−6.1	

=== Cook ===
1934 Australian federal election: Cook
Party	Candidate	Votes	%	±%
Labor (NSW)	Jock Garden	27,020	52.2	+3.0
Labor	Edward Riley	12,993	25.1	−1.8
United Australia	Francis Donnan	8,029	15.5	−7.7
Social Credit	Florence Cochrane	2,409	4.7	+4.7
Communist	Tom Wright	1,315	2.5	+2.5
Total formal votes		51,766	94.4	
Informal votes		3,092	5.6	
Turnout		54,858	96.1	
Two-party-preferred result
Labor (NSW)	Jock Garden		58.3	+6.3
Labor	Edward Riley		41.7	−6.3
Labor (NSW) hold		Swing	+6.3	

=== Cowper ===
1934 Australian federal election: Cowper
Party	Candidate	Votes	%	±%
Country	Earle Page	30,924	64.2	−3.2
Labor (NSW)	William McCristal	10,321	21.4	+9.6
Social Credit	Hereward Kesteven	6,958	14.4	+14.4
Total formal votes		48,203	97.7	
Informal votes		1,130	2.3	
Turnout		49,333	95.5	
Two-party-preferred result
Country	Earle Page		70.4	−4.9
Labor (NSW)	William McCristal		29.6	+29.6
Country hold		Swing	−4.9	

=== Dalley ===
1934 Australian federal election: Dalley
Party	Candidate	Votes	%	±%
Labor (NSW)	Sol Rosevear	25,881	48.0	+9.5
United Australia	William Nicol	20,655	38.3	−1.3
Labor	William Thompson	3,591	6.7	−13.6
Social Credit	Henry Giles	2,079	3.9	+3.9
Independent Labor	Jervis Blackman	997	1.8	+1.8
Communist	James McPhee	689	1.3	+0.8
Total formal votes		53,892	94.5	
Informal votes		3,151	5.5	
Turnout		57,043	96.7	
Two-party-preferred result
Labor (NSW)	Sol Rosevear		57.8	+3.1
United Australia	William Nicol		42.2	−3.1
Labor (NSW) hold		Swing	+3.1	

=== Darling ===
1934 Australian federal election: Darling
Party	Candidate	Votes	%	±%
Labor (NSW)	Joe Clark	18,208	40.0	+14.9
Country	Paul Goldenstedt	13,567	29.8	−6.9
Labor	Arthur Blakeley	13,016	28.6	−8.4
Communist	Stuart Coombe	758	1.7	+0.5
Total formal votes		45,549	96.5	
Informal votes		1,662	3.5	
Turnout		47,211	93.0	
Two-party-preferred result
Labor (NSW)	Joe Clark	28,944	63.5	+63.5
Country	Paul Goldenstedt	16,605	36.5	−2.8
Labor (NSW) gain from Labor		Swing	+63.5	

=== East Sydney ===
1934 Australian federal election: East Sydney
Party	Candidate	Votes	%	±%
Labor (NSW)	Eddie Ward	25,567	49.9	+3.9
United Australia	Arthur Butterell	21,686	42.3	+1.2
Labor	George Laughlan	2,400	4.7	−8.2
Communist	Bill McDougall	1,592	3.1	+3.1
Total formal votes		51,245	96.1	
Informal votes		2,070	3.9	
Turnout		53,315	92.0	
Two-party-preferred result
Labor (NSW)	Eddie Ward		55.9	+0.2
United Australia	Arthur Butterell		44.1	−0.2
Labor (NSW) hold		Swing	+0.2	

=== Eden-Monaro ===
1934 Australian federal election: Eden-Monaro
Party	Candidate	Votes	%	±%
United Australia	John Perkins	27,707	56.6	+21.1
Labor (NSW)	Charles Johnston	16,928	34.6	+34.6
Labor	Leo O'Sullivan	4,290	8.8	−17.5
Total formal votes		48,925	98.1	
Informal votes		936	3.4	
Turnout		49,861	96.5	
Two-party-preferred result
United Australia	John Perkins		58.8	−6.2
Labor (NSW)	Charles Johnston		41.2	+41.2
United Australia hold		Swing	−6.2	

=== Gwydir ===
1934 Australian federal election: Gwydir
Party	Candidate	Votes	%	±%
Country	Aubrey Abbott	26,229	52.5	−5.7
Labor (NSW)	Edward Cummins	19,682	39.4	+28.3
Labor	Arthur Griffith	4,030	8.1	−25.7
Total formal votes		49,941	98.1	
Informal votes		984	1.9	
Turnout		50,925	95.3	
Two-party-preferred result
Country	Aubrey Abbott		54.5	−8.2
Labor (NSW)	Edward Cummins		45.5	+45.5
Country hold		Swing	−8.2	

=== Hume ===
1934 Australian federal election: Hume
Party	Candidate	Votes	%	±%
Country	Thomas Collins	26,298	52.9	−1.0
Labor (NSW)	Essell Hoad	16,492	33.2	+22.1
Labor	Gerald O'Sullivan	6,877	13.8	−20.0
Total formal votes		49,667	98.3	
Informal votes		862	1.7	
Turnout		50,529	95.7	
Two-party-preferred result
Country	Thomas Collins		56.4	−1.3
Labor (NSW)	Essell Hoad		43.6	+43.6
Country hold		Swing	−1.3	

=== Hunter ===
1934 Australian federal election: Hunter
Party	Candidate	Votes	%	±%
Labor (NSW)	Rowley James	31,180	65.1	+17.0
Labor	Thomas Ledsam	11,844	24.7	+14.3
Communist	Henry Scanlon	4,904	10.2	+6.3
Total formal votes		47,928	95.7	
Informal votes		2,173	4.3	
Turnout		50,101	96.9	
Two-party-preferred result
Labor (NSW)	Rowley James		74.3	+17.1
Labor	Thomas Ledsam		35.7	+35.7
Labor (NSW) hold		Swing	+17.1	

=== Lang ===
1934 Australian federal election: Lang
Party	Candidate	Votes	%	±%
Labor (NSW)	Dan Mulcahy	21,398	41.4	+6.0
United Australia	Charles Robinson	19,623	37.9	−5.3
Social Credit	Colin Barclay-Smith	5,687	11.0	+11.0
Labor	Allan Howie	3,667	7.1	−14.3
Independent	Rufus Naylor	1,347	2.6	+2.6
Total formal votes		51,722	95.2	
Informal votes		2,597	4.8	
Turnout		54,319	96.1	
Two-party-preferred result
Labor (NSW)	Dan Mulcahy	29,546	57.1	−6.8
United Australia	Charles Robinson	22,176	42.9	+6.8
Labor (NSW) hold		Swing	−6.8	

=== Macquarie ===
1934 Australian federal election: Macquarie
Party	Candidate	Votes	%	±%
United Australia	John Lawson	22,010	45.3	−0.3
Labor (NSW)	Tony Luchetti	14,506	29.8	+8.3
Labor	Ben Chifley	10,114	20.8	−6.0
Social Credit	Edward Smythe	1,099	2.3	+2.3
Communist	Jock Jamieson	876	1.8	+0.5
Total formal votes		48,605	95.6	
Informal votes		2,226	4.4	
Turnout		50,831	96.7	
Two-party-preferred result
United Australia	John Lawson	25,934	53.4	+0.7
Labor (NSW)	Tony Luchetti	22,671	46.6	+46.6
United Australia hold		Swing	+0.7	

=== Martin ===
1934 Australian federal election: Martin
Party	Candidate	Votes	%	±%
United Australia	William McCall	28,079	53.6	−9.4
Labor (NSW)	Charles Hankin	15,183	29.0	+4.7
Social Credit	William Stones	5,395	10.3	+10.3
Labor	John McCallum	1,932	3.7	−4.0
Labor	Henry McDicken	1,813	3.5	+3.5
Total formal votes		52,402	96.3	
Informal votes		2,031	3.7	
Turnout		54,433	97.4	
Two-party-preferred result
United Australia	William McCall		60.5	−4.5
Labor (NSW)	Charles Hankin		39.5	+4.5
United Australia hold		Swing	−4.5	

=== New England ===
1934 Australian federal election: New England
Party	Candidate	Votes	%	±%
Country	Victor Thompson	21,325	44.1	−9.6
Labor (NSW)	John O'Connor	14,836	30.7	+27.1
United Australia	Patrick Cantwell	12,210	25.2	+11.5
Total formal votes		48,371	97.6	
Informal votes		1,179	2.4	
Turnout		49,550	95.8	
Two-party-preferred result
Country	Victor Thompson	29,862	61.7	−4.9
Labor (NSW)	John O'Connor	18,509	38.3	+38.3
Country hold		Swing	−4.9	

=== Newcastle ===
1934 Australian federal election: Newcastle
Party	Candidate	Votes	%	±%
Labor	David Watkins	29,600	57.2	+25.1
Labor (NSW)	James Smith	17,853	34.5	+7.6
Communist	Sidney Bethune	4,326	8.4	+6.5
Total formal votes		51,779	96.8	
Informal votes		1,697	3.2	
Turnout		53,476	97.1	
Two-party-preferred result
Labor	David Watkins		58.1	−6.0
Labor (NSW)	James Smith		41.9	+41.9
Labor hold		Swing	−6.0	

=== North Sydney ===
1934 Australian federal election: North Sydney
Party	Candidate	Votes	%	±%
United Australia	Billy Hughes	35,532	65.1	−12.2
Labor (NSW)	Stan Taylor	12,684	23.2	+0.6
Social Credit	Vincent Kelly	6,385	11.7	+11.7
Total formal votes		54,601	98.0	
Informal votes		1,112	2.0	
Turnout		55,713	96.0	
Two-party-preferred result
United Australia	Billy Hughes		71.0	+13.5
Labor (NSW)	Stan Taylor		29.0	+29.0
United Australia hold		Swing	+13.5	

=== Parkes ===
1934 Australian federal election: Parkes
Party	Candidate	Votes	%	±%
United Australia	Charles Marr	31,745	60.0	−1.3
Labor (NSW)	Leo Taylor	15,591	29.5	+6.1
Social Credit	Harold Bondeson	5,564	10.5	+10.5
Total formal votes		52,900	97.9	
Informal votes		1,108	2.1	
Turnout		54,008	95.7	
Two-party-preferred result
United Australia	Charles Marr		66.3	+0.5
Labor (NSW)	Leo Taylor		33.7	−0.5
United Australia hold		Swing	+0.5	

=== Parramatta ===
1934 Australian federal election: Parramatta
Party	Candidate	Votes	%	±%
United Australia	Frederick Stewart	33,779	65.1	−3.5
Labor (NSW)	John Garvan	12,722	24.5	+9.2
Social Credit	Howard Miscamble	3,357	6.5	+6.5
Labor	John Keegan	2,057	4.0	−10.8
Total formal votes		51,915	97.3	
Informal votes		1,438	2.7	
Turnout		53,353	95.9	
Two-party-preferred result
United Australia	Frederick Stewart		69.4	−3.0
Labor (NSW)	John Garvan		30.6	+3.0
United Australia hold		Swing	−3.0	

=== Reid ===
1934 Australian federal election: Reid
Party	Candidate	Votes	%	±%
Labor (NSW)	Joe Gander	25,208	48.9	+7.9
United Australia	William Moore	16,522	32.0	+0.7
Social Credit	Harry Barnes	4,453	8.6	+8.6
Labor	Albert Rowe	4,092	7.9	−19.8
Communist	John Terry	1,313	2.5	+2.5
Total formal votes		51,588	95.3	
Informal votes		2,565	4.7	
Turnout		64,153	96.6	
Two-party-preferred result
Labor (NSW)	Joe Gander		62.1	+3.0
United Australia	William Moore		37.9	−3.0
Labor (NSW) hold		Swing	+3.0	

=== Richmond ===
1934 Australian federal election: Richmond
Party	Candidate	Votes	%	±%
Country	Roland Green	14,230	28.6	−7.0
Labor (NSW)	Jim Fredericks	13,992	28.2	+28.2
Country	Jim Eggins	13,570	27.3	+27.3
Country	Robert Gibson	7,887	15.9	+15.9
Total formal votes		49,679	97.1	
Informal votes		1,478	2.9	
Turnout		51,157	95.8	
Two-party-preferred result
Country	Roland Green	25,366	51.1	+51.1
Country	Jim Eggins	24,313	48.9	+48.9
Country hold		Swing	+51.1	

=== Riverina ===
1934 Australian federal election: Riverina
Party	Candidate	Votes	%	±%
Country	Horace Nock	26,719	55.0	−10.5
Labor (NSW)	Edward O'Neill	15,441	31.8	+11.4
Labor	John Cusack	6,379	13.1	−1.0
Total formal votes		48,539	97.7	
Informal votes		1,134	2.3	
Turnout		49,673	94.2	
Two-party-preferred result
Country	Horace Nock		59.3	+8.0
Labor (NSW)	Edward O'Neill		40.7	+40.7
Country hold		Swing	+8.0	

=== Robertson ===
1934 Australian federal election: Robertson
Party	Candidate	Votes	%	±%
United Australia	Sydney Gardner	20,637	42.6	−11.4
Labor (NSW)	Gordon Cross	19,990	41.3	+17.7
Country	William Fleming	5,732	11.8	+11.8
Country	Campbell Marshall	2,093	4.3	+4.3
Total formal votes		48,452	95.9	
Informal votes		2,070	4.1	
Turnout		50,522	95.3	
Two-party-preferred result
United Australia	Sydney Gardner	27,240	56.2	−7.9
Labor (NSW)	Gordon Cross	21,212	43.8	+7.9
United Australia hold		Swing	−7.9	

=== Warringah ===
1934 Australian federal election: Warringah
Party	Candidate	Votes	%	±%
United Australia	Archdale Parkhill	38,775	71.3	−28.7
Labor (NSW)	Bessie Frewin	8,857	16.3	+16.3
Social Credit	Robert Pearson	6,749	12.4	+12.4
Total formal votes		54,381	97.6	
Informal votes		1,321	2.4	
Turnout		55,702	95.8	
Two-party-preferred result
United Australia	Archdale Parkhill		77.5	+18.2
Labor (NSW)	Bessie Frewin		32.5	+32.5
United Australia hold		Swing	+18.2	

=== Watson ===
1934 Australian federal election: Watson
Party	Candidate	Votes	%	±%
United Australia	John Jennings	28,758	54.9	−1.4
Labor (NSW)	Joe Lamaro	17,817	34.0	+13.4
Labor	William Murphy	3,398	6.5	−10.9
Social Credit	Vincent Murtagh	2,371	4.5	+4.5
Total formal votes		52,344	97.1	
Informal votes		1,537	2.9	
Turnout		53,881	95.4	
Two-party-preferred result
United Australia	John Jennings		58.7	−5.8
Labor (NSW)	Joe Lamaro		41.3	+5.8
United Australia hold		Swing	−5.8	

=== Wentworth ===
1934 Australian federal election: Wentworth
Party	Candidate	Votes	%	±%
United Australia	Eric Harrison	34,012	65.7	−34.3
Labor (NSW)	James Ormonde	13,287	25.7	+25.7
Social Credit	Ralph Fretwell	4,466	8.6	+8.6
Total formal votes		51,765	97.6	
Informal votes		1,296	2.4	
Turnout		53,061	95.6	
Two-party-preferred result
United Australia	Eric Harrison		71.0	+5.2
Labor (NSW)	James Ormonde		29.0	+29.0
United Australia hold		Swing	+5.2	

=== Werriwa ===
1934 Australian federal election: Werriwa
Party	Candidate	Votes	%	±%
United Australia	Thomas Mutch	22,981	46.1	+46.1
Labor (NSW)	Bert Lazzarini	22,561	45.3	+5.3
Communist	Bill Blake	2,610	5.2	+5.2
Labor	Thomas Lavelle	1,695	3.4	−6.0
Total formal votes		49,847	97.1	
Informal votes		1,466	2.9	
Turnout		51,313	96.6	
Two-candidate-preferred result
Labor (NSW)	Bert Lazzarini	26,180	52.5	+3.2
United Australia	Thomas Mutch	23,667	47.5	+47.5
Labor (NSW) gain from Country		Swing	+3.2	

=== West Sydney ===
1934 Australian federal election: West Sydney
Party	Candidate	Votes	%	±%
Labor (NSW)	Jack Beasley	32,283	63.5	+7.9
United Australia	Henry Wood	11,160	22.0	−0.9
Labor	Clarrie Campbell	3,398	6.7	−13.0
Social Credit	Frederick Taylor	2,529	5.0	+5.0
Communist	Robert Brechin	1,460	2.9	+1.7
Total formal votes		50,830	95.2	
Informal votes		2,571	4.8	
Turnout		53,401	95.1	
Two-party-preferred result
Labor (NSW)	Jack Beasley		73.7	+1.9
United Australia	Henry Wood		26.3	−1.9
Labor (NSW) hold		Swing	+1.9	

== Victoria ==
=== Balaclava ===
1934 Australian federal election: Balaclava
Party	Candidate	Votes	%	±%
United Australia	Thomas White	41,017	72.9	−2.7
Labor	Michael Nolan	15,248	27.1	+6.5
Total formal votes		56,265	96.9	
Informal votes		1,788	3.1	
Turnout		58,053	95.0	
United Australia hold		Swing	−3.6	

=== Ballaarat ===
1934 Australian federal election: Ballaarat
Party	Candidate	Votes	%	±%
Labor	William McAdam	17,725	43.9	+9.8
United Australia	Archibald Fisken	11,856	29.4	−19.6
Ind. United Australia	Fred Edmunds	10,752	26.7	+26.7
Total formal votes		40,333	98.4	
Informal votes		658	1.6	
Turnout		40,991	97.2	
Two-party-preferred result
United Australia	Archibald Fisken	21,746	53.9	−9.4
Labor	William McAdam	18,587	46.1	+9.4
United Australia hold		Swing	−9.4	

=== Batman ===
1934 Australian federal election: Batman
Party	Candidate	Votes	%	±%
Labor	Frank Brennan	36,910	56.1	+10.5
United Australia	Samuel Dennis	28,846	43.9	−4.9
Total formal votes		65,756	97.3	
Informal votes		1,790	2.7	
Turnout		67,546	96.0	
Labor gain from United Australia		Swing	+6.9	

=== Bendigo ===
1934 Australian federal election: Bendigo
Party	Candidate	Votes	%	±%
United Australia	Eric Harrison	21,683	51.6	−7.9
Labor	Richard Keane	20,378	48.4	+7.9
Total formal votes		42,061	98.8	
Informal votes		522	1.2	
Turnout		42,583	95.1	
United Australia hold		Swing	−7.9	

=== Bourke ===
1934 Australian federal election: Bourke
Party	Candidate	Votes	%	±%
Labor	Maurice Blackburn	35,728	60.1	+12.4
United Australia	Henry Stubbs	20,176	34.0	−11.2
Communist	Robert McCrae	3,509	5.9	+3.0
Total formal votes		59,413	96.2	
Informal votes		2,338	3.8	
Turnout		61,751	95.6	
Two-party-preferred result
Labor	Maurice Blackburn		65.6	+14.5
United Australia	Henry Stubbs		34.4	−14.5
Labor hold		Swing	+14.5	

=== Corangamite ===
1934 Australian federal election: Corangamite
Party	Candidate	Votes	%	±%
United Australia	Geoffrey Street	15,400	36.8	+36.8
Labor	Arthur Haywood	15,222	36.4	−0.7
Country	Gordon McGregor	5,217	12.5	−40.0
Country	Gordon Bristow	4,334	10.4	+10.4
Independent	Bevis Walters	1,676	4.0	+4.0
Total formal votes		41,849	96.1	
Informal votes		1,687	3.9	
Turnout		43,536	95.0	
Two-party-preferred result
United Australia	Geoffrey Street	23,296	55.7	+55.7
Labor	Arthur Haywood	18,553	44.3	+7.2
United Australia gain from Country		Swing	−7.2	

=== Corio ===
1934 Australian federal election: Corio
Party	Candidate	Votes	%	±%
United Australia	Richard Casey	30,622	58.5	+21.5
Labor	John Dedman	20,394	38.9	+4.0
Communist	William Morrison	1,355	2.6	+2.6
Total formal votes		52,371	98.1	
Informal votes		1,040	1.9	
Turnout		53,411	94.5	
Two-party-preferred result
United Australia	Richard Casey		58.8	−1.8
Labor	John Dedman		41.2	+1.8
United Australia hold		Swing	−1.8	

=== Echuca ===
1934 Australian federal election: Echuca
Party	Candidate	Votes	%	±%
Labor	William Hartshorne	12,407	29.2	+29.2
Country	John McEwen	11,371	26.7	+31.1
Country	Galloway Stewart	10,075	23.7	+23.7
Country	William Moss	8,663	20.4	+20.4
Total formal votes		42,516	97.4	
Informal votes		1,132	2.6	
Turnout		43,648	95.1	
Two-party-preferred result
Country	John McEwen	27,599	64.9	
Country	Galloway Stewart	14,917	35.1	
Country hold		Swing		

=== Fawkner ===
1934 Australian federal election: Fawkner
Party	Candidate	Votes	%	±%
United Australia	George Maxwell	30,029	66.5	−1.2
Labor	William Smith	12,515	27.7	+0.5
Social Credit	Frederick Paice	2,592	5.7	+5.7
Total formal votes		45,136	96.6	
Informal votes		1,569	3.4	
Turnout		46,705	93.7	
Two-party-preferred result
United Australia	George Maxwell		69.4	−0.9
Labor	William Smith		30.6	+0.9
United Australia hold		Swing	−0.9	

=== Flinders ===
1934 Australian federal election: Flinders
Party	Candidate	Votes	%	±%
United Australia	James Fairbairn	41,565	60.9	−7.4
Labor	Joseph Hannan	16,061	23.5	−8.2
Country	William Fullerton	5,860	8.6	+8.6
Communist	Ralph Gibson	4,750	7.0	+7.0
Total formal votes		68,236	96.7	
Informal votes		2,343	3.3	
Turnout		70,579	95.6	
Two-party-preferred result
United Australia	James Fairbairn		69.4	+1.1
Labor	Joseph Hannan		30.6	−1.1
United Australia hold		Swing	+1.1	

=== Gippsland ===
1934 Australian federal election: Gippsland
Party	Candidate	Votes	%	±%
Country	Thomas Paterson	32,765	69.3	−30.7
Independent	Reg Pollard	14,489	30.7	+30.7
Total formal votes		47,254	98.3	
Informal votes		828	1.7	
Turnout		48,082	94.8	
Country hold		Swing	−30.7	

=== Henty ===
1934 Australian federal election: Henty
Party	Candidate	Votes	%	±%
United Australia	Sir Henry Gullett	47,010	60.1	−14.9
Labor	William Turner	16,878	21.6	−3.4
Ind. Nationalist	Alexander Steele	8,315	10.6	+10.6
Social Credit	Lockhart Stewart	6,030	7.7	+7.7
Total formal votes		78,233	96.9	
Informal votes		2,544	3.1	
Turnout		80,777	94.6	
Two-party-preferred result
United Australia	Sir Henry Gullett		69.3	−5.7
Labor	William Turner		30.7	+5.7
United Australia hold		Swing	−5.7	

=== Indi ===
1934 Australian federal election: Indi
Party	Candidate	Votes	%	±%
Labor	Paul Jones	17,430	40.8	+5.6
United Australia	William Hutchinson	16,400	38.4	−6.6
Country	Vernon Davies	8,894	20.8	+0.9
Total formal votes		42,724	98.0	
Informal votes		893	2.0	
Turnout		43,617	94.7	
Two-party-preferred result
United Australia	William Hutchinson	24,033	56.3	−6.7
Labor	Paul Jones	18,691	43.7	+6.7
United Australia hold		Swing	−6.7	

=== Kooyong ===
1934 Australian federal election: Kooyong
Party	Candidate	Votes	%	±%
United Australia	Robert Menzies	41,876	61.7	−14.8
Labor	Maurice Kelly	13,051	19.2	−4.3
Social Credit	Leslie Hollins	12,980	19.1	+19.1
Total formal votes		67,907	97.2	
Informal votes		1,946	2.8	
Turnout		69,853	95.3	
Two-party-preferred result
United Australia	Robert Menzies		70.8	−5.7
Labor	Maurice Kelly		29.2	+5.7
United Australia hold		Swing	−5.7	

=== Maribyrnong ===
1934 Australian federal election: Maribyrnong
Party	Candidate	Votes	%	±%
Labor	Arthur Drakeford	27,485	49.8	+1.2
United Australia	James Fenton	22,648	41.0	−8.3
Social Credit	Alexander Amess	2,773	5.0	+5.0
Communist	Jack Blake	2,300	4.2	+4.2
Total formal votes		55,206	95.9	
Informal votes		2,336	4.1	
Turnout		57,542	96.6	
Two-party-preferred result
Labor	Arthur Drakeford		56.7	+7.1
United Australia	James Fenton		43.3	−7.1
Labor gain from United Australia		Swing	+7.1	

=== Melbourne ===
1934 Australian federal election: Melbourne
Party	Candidate	Votes	%	±%
Labor	William Maloney	26,256	69.4	+7.4
United Australia	Francis Nelson	11,576	30.6	−7.4
Total formal votes		37,832	95.6	
Informal votes		1,761	4.4	
Turnout		39,593	96.3	
Labor hold		Swing	+7.4	

=== Melbourne Ports ===
1934 Australian federal election: Melbourne Ports
Party	Candidate	Votes	%	±%
Labor	Jack Holloway	27,081	62.8	−6.4
United Australia	James Laurence	12,173	28.2	−2.1
Socialist	William Clarke	3,872	9.0	+9.0
Total formal votes		43,126	95.7	
Informal votes		1,941	4.3	
Turnout		45,067	93.2	
Two-party-preferred result
Labor	Jack Holloway		70.9	+10.6
United Australia	James Laurence		29.1	−10.6
Labor hold		Swing	+10.6	

=== Wannon ===
1934 Australian federal election: Wannon
Party	Candidate	Votes	%	±%
United Australia	Thomas Scholfield	16,488	37.7	+2.0
Labor	Don McLeod	14,515	33.2	−1.5
Country	Henry Bailey	12,703	29.1	−0.5
Total formal votes		43,706	98.6	
Informal votes		604	1.4	
Turnout		44,310	95.5	
Two-party-preferred result
United Australia	Thomas Scholfield	24,014	54.9	−7.4
Labor	Don McLeod	19,692	45.1	+7.4
United Australia hold		Swing	−7.4	

=== Wimmera ===
1934 Australian federal election: Wimmera
Party	Candidate	Votes	%	±%
Country	Hugh McClelland	16,509	33.3	−11.1
Independent Country	Les Simpson	16,488	33.2	+33.2
United Australia	William Morgan	8,788	17.7	−10.3
Single Tax League	Gordon Anderson	7,817	15.8	+15.8
Total formal votes		49,602	96.8	
Informal votes		1,662	3.2	
Turnout		51,264	94.2	
Two-party-preferred result
Country	Hugh McClelland	25,279	51.0	−10.8
Independent Country	Les Simpson	24,323	49.0	+49.0
Country hold		Swing	−10.8	

=== Yarra ===
1934 Australian federal election: Yarra
Party	Candidate	Votes	%	±%
Labor	James Scullin	25,601	65.0	+5.1
United Australia	Harold Holt	10,741	27.3	−7.6
Communist	Ernie Thornton	3,072	7.8	+4.9
Total formal votes		39,414	95.2	
Informal votes		1,966	4.8	
Turnout		41,380	93.5	
Two-party-preferred result
Labor	James Scullin		72.1	+8.8
United Australia	Harold Holt		27.9	−8.8
Labor hold		Swing	+8.8	

== Queensland ==
=== Brisbane ===
1934 Australian federal election: Brisbane
Party	Candidate	Votes	%	±%
Labor	George Lawson	27,218	51.9	+4.4
United Australia	Neil O'Sullivan	20,484	39.1	−8.1
Communist	Bert Hurworth	2,593	4.9	+4.9
Social Credit	Patrick Madden	2,147	4.1	+4.1
Total formal votes		52,442	97.0	
Informal votes		1,628	3.0	
Turnout		54,070	93.8	
Two-party-preferred result
Labor	George Lawson		58.5	+6.8
United Australia	Neil O'Sullivan		41.5	−6.8
Labor hold		Swing	+6.8	

=== Capricornia ===
1934 Australian federal election: Capricornia
Party	Candidate	Votes	%	±%
Labor	Frank Forde	29,902	60.3	+1.0
United Australia	John O'Shanesy	19,706	39.7	+39.7
Total formal votes		49,608	98.1	
Informal votes		965	1.9	
Turnout		50,573	96.5	
Labor hold		Swing	+1.0	

=== Darling Downs ===
1934 Australian federal election: Darling Downs
Party	Candidate	Votes	%	±%
United Australia	Sir Littleton Groom	29,428	60.8	+25.6
Labor	Phil Alke	18,940	39.2	+39.2
Total formal votes		48,368	98.0	
Informal votes		999	2.0	
Turnout		49,367	96.8	
United Australia gain from Independent		Swing	+25.6	

=== Griffith ===
1934 Australian federal election: Griffith
Party	Candidate	Votes	%	±%
Labor	Francis Baker	28,184	53.4	−6.1
United Australia	George Mocatta	18,494	35.1	−3.4
Social Credit	Julius Streeter	6,076	11.5	+11.5
Total formal votes		52,754	97.3	
Informal votes		1,464	2.7	
Turnout		54,218	96.1	
Two-party-preferred result
Labor	Francis Baker		59.2	−1.3
United Australia	George Mocatta		40.8	+1.3
Labor hold		Swing	−1.3	

=== Herbert ===
1934 Australian federal election: Herbert
Party	Candidate	Votes	%	±%
Labor	George Martens	27,721	52.3	−3.7
United Australia	Ron Muir	20,005	37.7	−6.3
Communist	Jack Henry	4,404	8.3	+8.3
Lang Labor	Claude Vesperman	865	1.6	+1.6
Total formal votes		52,995	95.6	
Informal votes		2,429	4.4	
Turnout		55,424	94.0	
Two-party-preferred result
Labor	George Martens		61.0	+5.0
United Australia	Ron Muir		39.0	−5.0
Labor hold		Swing	+5.0	

=== Kennedy ===
1934 Australian federal election: Kennedy
Party	Candidate	Votes	%	±%
Labor	Darby Riordan	27,290	59.7	+0.2
United Australia	Jim Clarke	16,275	35.6	−4.9
Communist	Jim Slater	2,172	4.7	+4.7
Total formal votes		45,737	96.9	
Informal votes		1,452	3.1	
Turnout		47,189	88.5	
Two-party-preferred result
Labor	Darby Riordan		63.9	+4.4
United Australia	Jim Clarke		36.1	−4.4
Labor hold		Swing	+4.4	

=== Lilley ===
1934 Australian federal election: Lilley
Party	Candidate	Votes	%	±%
United Australia	Sir Donald Cameron	26,105	51.4	−3.4
Labor	Bert Turner	20,232	39.9	+39.9
Ind. Social Credit	Clayton Keir	4,423	8.7	+8.7
Total formal votes		50,760	98.1	
Informal votes		976	1.9	
Turnout		51,736	96.2	
Two-party-preferred result
United Australia	Sir Donald Cameron		55.8	−4.4
Labor	Bert Turner		44.2	+44.2
United Australia hold		Swing	−4.4	

=== Maranoa ===
1934 Australian federal election: Maranoa
Party	Candidate	Votes	%	±%
Country	James Hunter	24,928	51.8	+2.1
Labor	Duncan Watson	19,674	40.9	−3.9
Social Credit	William Argaet	3,493	7.3	+7.3
Total formal votes		48,095	98.1	
Informal votes		935	1.9	
Turnout		49,030	92.8	
Two-party-preferred result
Country	James Hunter		56.5	+1.7
Labor	Duncan Watson		43.5	−1.7
Country hold		Swing	+1.7	

=== Moreton ===
1934 Australian federal election: Moreton
Party	Candidate	Votes	%	±%
United Australia	Josiah Francis	27,951	51.2	−48.8
Labor	Jack Perrett	20,886	38.2	+38.2
Social Credit	William Worley	5,794	10.6	+10.6
Total formal votes		54,631	97.3	
Informal votes		1,525	2.7	
Turnout		56,156	96.2	
Two-party-preferred result
United Australia	Josiah Francis		56.5	−43.5
Labor	Jack Perrett		43.5	+43.5
United Australia hold		Swing	−43.5	

=== Wide Bay ===
1934 Australian federal election: Wide Bay
Party	Candidate	Votes	%	±%
Country	Bernard Corser	26,254	53.7	−46.3
Labor	George Webb	15,857	32.4	+32.4
Social Credit	Geoffrey Nichols	5,723	11.7	+11.7
Communist	Colin Hennessy	1,085	2.2	+2.2
Total formal votes		48,919	97.6	
Informal votes		1,196	2.4	
Turnout		50,115	95.2	
Two-party-preferred result
Country	Bernard Corser		59.8	−40.2
Labor	George Webb		40.2	+40.2
Country hold		Swing	−40.2	

== South Australia ==
=== Adelaide ===
1934 Australian federal election: Adelaide
Party	Candidate	Votes	%	±%
Labor	Ken Bardolph	19,985	36.9	+6.9
United Australia	Fred Stacey	19,941	36.8	−10.4
Independent	Alec Bagot	9,055	16.7	+16.7
Social Credit	Ernest Hergstrom	2,403	4.4	+4.4
Independent Labor	Arthur McArthur	1,711	3.2	+3.2
Independent Labor	Frank Blake	1,089	2.0	+2.0
Total formal votes		54,184	91.2	
Informal votes		5,212	8.8	
Turnout		59,396	94.2	
Two-party-preferred result
United Australia	Fred Stacey	28,848	53.2	−8.1
Labor	Ken Bardolph	25,336	46.8	+8.1
United Australia hold		Swing	−8.1	

=== Barker ===
1934 Australian federal election: Barker
Party	Candidate	Votes	%	±%
Country	Archie Cameron	32,311	62.3	+62.3
Labor	Cecil Skitch	12,923	24.9	+6.1
Social Credit	John Maycock	6,598	12.7	+12.7
Total formal votes		51,832	95.1	
Informal votes		2,684	4.9	
Turnout		54,516	95.1	
Two-party-preferred result
Country	Archie Cameron		68.7	+68.7
Labor	Cecil Skitch		31.3	+6.4
Country gain from United Australia		Swing	−6.4	

=== Boothby ===
1934 Australian federal election: Boothby
Party	Candidate	Votes	%	±%
United Australia	John Price	20,504	36.9	−6.8
Labor	David Fraser	14,427	25.9	+1.1
United Australia	Keith Wilson	13,404	24.1	+24.1
Social Credit	Norman Truscott	3,293	5.9	+5.9
Independent	Charles Barnard	2,953	5.3	+5.3
Independent	James Lumbers	1,052	1.9	+1.9
Total formal votes		55,633	92.3	
Informal votes		4,359	7.3	
Turnout		59,992	94.8	
Two-party-preferred result
United Australia	John Price	36,526	65.7	−6.7
Labor	David Fraser	19,107	34.3	+6.7
United Australia hold		Swing	−6.7	

=== Grey ===
1934 Australian federal election: Grey
Party	Candidate	Votes	%	±%
United Australia	Philip McBride	24,930	55.2	+1.5
Labor	Michael Murphy	15,424	34.2	+9.0
Independent	Alfred Barns	4,781	10.6	+6.8
Total formal votes		45,135	95.2	
Informal votes		2,297	4.8	
Turnout		47,432	96.0	
Two-party-preferred result
United Australia	Philip McBride		60.0	−0.6
Labor	Michael Murphy		40.0	+0.6
United Australia hold		Swing	−0.6	

=== Hindmarsh ===
1934 Australian federal election: Hindmarsh
Party	Candidate	Votes	%	±%
Labor	Norman Makin	34,275	61.9	+8.0
Independent	Ernest Evans	13,329	24.1	+24.1
Social Credit	Charles Brock	6,787	12.3	+12.3
Communist	Tom Garland	1,011	1.8	+1.8
Total formal votes		55,402	93.6	
Informal votes		3,790	6.4	
Turnout		59,192	94.8	
Two-party-preferred result
Labor	Norman Makin		66.7	+9.2
Independent	Ernest Evans		33.3	+33.3
Labor hold		Swing	+9.2	

=== Wakefield ===
1934 Australian federal election: Wakefield
Party	Candidate	Votes	%	±%
United Australia	Charles Hawker	31,493	65.1	−2.8
Labor	Michael Smedley	9,274	19.2	+5.2
Social Credit	Will Duggan	7,615	15.7	+15.7
Total formal votes		48,382	94.9	
Informal votes		2,601	5.1	
Turnout		50,983	95.3	
Two-party-preferred result
United Australia	Charles Hawker		74.0	+8.7
Labor	Michael Smedley		26.0	+26.0
United Australia hold		Swing	+8.7	

== Western Australia ==
=== Forrest ===
1934 Australian federal election: Forrest
Party	Candidate	Votes	%	±%
Country	John Prowse	18,996	47.2	−52.8
Labor	Edwin Davies	11,660	29.0	+29.0
Country	Cecil Elsegood	4,826	12.0	+12.0
Social Credit	Harry Squance	4,734	11.8	+11.8
Total formal votes		40,216	96.8	
Informal votes		1,593	3.8	
Turnout		41,809	92.0	
Two-party-preferred result
Country	John Prowse		63.8	−36.2
Labor	Edwin Davies		36.2	+36.2
Country hold		Swing	−36.2	

=== Fremantle ===
1934 Australian federal election: Fremantle
Party	Candidate	Votes	%	±%
Labor	John Curtin	22,331	45.7	+3.7
United Australia	Florence Cardell-Oliver	19,761	40.4	+9.5
Social Credit	William Buchan	6,782	13.9	+13.9
Total formal votes		48,874	97.1	
Informal votes		1,438	2.9	
Turnout		50,312	93.9	
Two-party-preferred result
Labor	John Curtin	24,951	51.1	+6.6
United Australia	Florence Cardell-Oliver	23,923	48.9	−6.6
Labor gain from United Australia		Swing	+6.6	

=== Kalgoorlie ===
1934 Australian federal election: Kalgoorlie
Party	Candidate	Votes	%	±%
Labor	Albert Green	unopposed		
Labor hold		Swing		

=== Perth ===
1934 Australian federal election: Perth
Party	Candidate	Votes	%	±%
United Australia	Walter Nairn	16,727	41.6	−18.9
Labor	Herb Graham	13,737	34.2	−5.3
Nationalist	Tom Hartrey	6,713	16.7	+16.7
Independent Liberal	Carlyle Ferguson	3,015	7.5	+7.5
Total formal votes		40,192	96.0	
Informal votes		1,667	4.0	
Turnout		41,859	92.2	
Two-party-preferred result
United Australia	Walter Nairn	22,821	56.8	−3.7
Labor	Herb Graham	17,371	43.2	+3.7
United Australia hold		Swing	−3.7	

=== Swan ===
1934 Australian federal election: Swan
Party	Candidate	Votes	%	±%
Country	Henry Gregory	32,101	63.2	+8.5
Labor	Frederick Law	18,713	36.8	+7.1
Total formal votes		50,814	96.0	
Informal votes		2,139	4.0	
Turnout		52,953	90.6	
Country hold		Swing	−0.6	

== Tasmania ==
=== Bass ===
1934 Australian federal election: Bass
Party	Candidate	Votes	%	±%
United Australia	Allan Guy	9,880	41.5	−5.1
Labor	Claude Barnard	6,572	27.6	−3.0
Independent	George McElwee	4,740	19.9	+19.9
Independent	John Watson	2,610	11.0	+11.0
Total formal votes		23,802	96.4	
Informal votes		887	3.6	
Turnout		24,689	96.2	
Two-party-preferred result
Labor	Claude Barnard	11,984	50.3	+14.8
United Australia	Allan Guy	11,818	49.7	−14.8
Labor gain from United Australia		Swing	+14.8	

=== Darwin ===
1934 Australian federal election: Darwin
Party	Candidate	Votes	%	±%
United Australia	George Bell	13,271	54.4	−15.5
Labor	Edwin Brown	11,126	45.6	+15.5
Total formal votes		24,397	97.4	
Informal votes		663	2.6	
Turnout		25,060	95.2	
United Australia hold		Swing	−15.5	

=== Denison ===
1934 Australian federal election: Denison
Party	Candidate	Votes	%	±%
United Australia	Arthur Hutchin	9,721	42.0	−13.0
Labor	Gerald Mahoney	4,461	19.3	+4.2
Labor	Walter Woods	3,154	13.6	+13.6
Labor	Richard Darcey	2,555	11.0	+11.0
Social Credit	James Guthrie	2,020	8.7	+8.7
Labor	John Lattin	1,216	5.3	+5.3
Total formal votes		23,127	94.2	
Informal votes		1,424	5.8	
Turnout		24,551	96.4	
Two-party-preferred result
Labor	Gerald Mahoney	11,622	50.3	+5.3
United Australia	Arthur Hutchin	11,505	49.7	−5.3
Labor gain from United Australia		Swing	+5.3	

=== Franklin ===
1934 Australian federal election: Franklin
Party	Candidate	Votes	%	±%
Labor	Charles Frost	10,850	43.1	+11.3
United Australia	Archibald Blacklow	10,015	39.8	−16.2
Social Credit	John Modridge	2,221	8.8	+8.8
Country	George Frankcombe	2,086	8.3	+8.3
Total formal votes		25,172	96.2	
Informal votes		981	3.8	
Turnout		26,153	96.5	
Two-party-preferred result
Labor	Charles Frost	13,182	52.4	+15.4
United Australia	Archibald Blacklow	11,990	47.6	−15.4
Labor gain from United Australia		Swing	+15.4	

=== Wilmot ===
1934 Australian federal election: Wilmot
Party	Candidate	Votes	%	±%
United Australia	Joseph Lyons	12,924	57.5	−2.7
Social Credit	Henry Bye	5,182	23.1	+23.1
Social Credit	William Laird Smith	4,357	19.4	+19.4
Total formal votes		22,463	96.2	
Informal votes		885	3.8	
Turnout		23,348	94.5	
Two-party-preferred result
United Australia	Joseph Lyons		59.4	−12.7
Social Credit	Henry Bye		40.6	+40.6
United Australia hold		Swing	−12.7	

== Northern Territory ==
=== Northern Territory ===
1934 Australian federal election: Northern Territory
Party	Candidate	Votes	%	±%
Independent	Adair Blain	926	49.8	+49.8
Labor	Harold Nelson	850	45.7	−4.7
Communist	Charles Priest	85	4.6	+4.6
Total formal votes		1,861	98.1	
Informal votes		37	1.9	
Turnout		1,898	78.8	
Two-party-preferred result
Independent	Adair Blain	964	51.8	+51.8
Labor	Harold Nelson	897	48.2	−7.5
Independent gain from Labor		Swing	+7.5	

== See also ==
- Candidates of the 1934 Australian federal election
- Members of the Australian House of Representatives, 1934–1937
