= Martha M. Simpson =

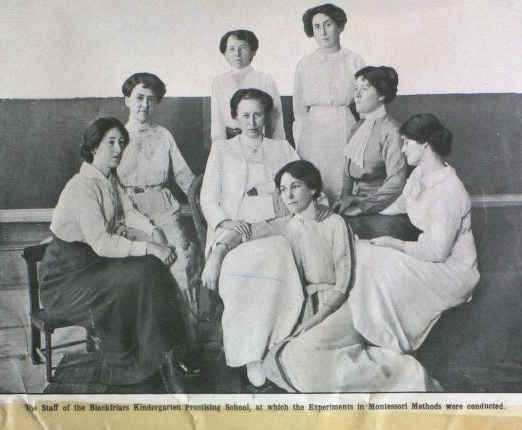
- from her 1914 report
- Born: Martha Margaret Mildred Simpson; 3 May 1865; Omagh, Tyrone, Ireland
- Died: 7 June 1948 (aged 83); Sydney, New South Wales, Australia
- Occupation: educationalist
- Known for: advocate for Montessoti education

Martha Margaret Mildred Simpson (pen name, Innisfail; 3 May 1865 – 7 June 1948) was an Irish-born Australian educational theorist and poet. She was responsible for pioneering new education methods in Australia, including promoting kindergarten education, supervised playgrounds and hospital schools.

== Biography ==
Martha Margaret Mildred Simpson was born 3 May 1865 in County Tyrone, Ireland.

She taught at New South Wales schools, including Wyee, Carrow Brook, Tea Tree, Tea Gardens, Woerden and Tamworth.

Simpson became the first Lecturer in kindergarten studies at the Sydney Teachers' College in 1908. In the following year, Simpson published a work entitled "Work in the kindergarten : an Australian programme, based on the life and customs of the Australian Black".

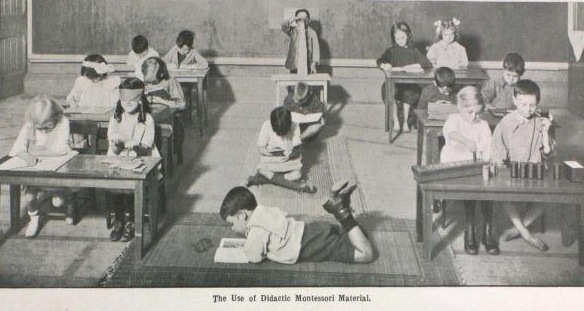
A didactic classroom - from Martha M. Simpson's 1914 report

In 1912, the New South Wales government sent Simpson to Europe to learn about the Montessori Method of education from Dr. Montessori herself. These principles were practiced at the demonstration school. In 1914, Simpson published her "Report on the Montessori Methods of Education". Simpson became the first female Inspector of Infant Schools for New South Wales in 1917. Simpson was also responsible for the kindergarten section of Blackfriars Demonstration School, part of the Sydney Teachers' College. Her early students included Amy Rowntree, who would carry the kindergarten message on to Tasmania.

In 1920, Simpson travelled to the US to further study education methods, and returned with ideas on improving the health of students. These ideas were implemented at Blackfriars, including nutritious lunches and a milk allowance.

Simpson retired from education in 1930 and the following year unsuccessfully stood for election for the New South Wales district of Annandale.

Simpson was a poet, and her works include "To an old grammar", which was published in An Anthology of Australian Verse, and "Friendship's Tribute", which was published under the pen name "Innisfail".

Simpson died in Sydney on 7 June 1948.
