= William Mahony (New South Wales politician) =

New South Wales politician (1856–1918)

William Henry Mahony (9 February 1856 – 26 July 1918) was an Australian politician.

He was born on 9 February 1856, in Adelaide, to builder Timothy Mahony and Elizabeth Johns. He was educated at Sydney Grammar School and was articled as a solicitor's clerk to Robert Burdett Smith in 1877. In 1882 he was admitted to practice as a solicitor. In 1894, he was elected to the New South Wales Legislative Assembly as the Free Trade member for Annandale. He held his seat until 1910, when he retired from politics. Mahony died at Glebe Point on 26 July 1918.

New South Wales Legislative Assembly
New seat	Member for Annandale; 1894–1910	Succeeded by Albert Bruntnell
