= Robert Coulter Booth =

Australian politician

Robert Coulter Booth (1846 – 13 January 1918) was an Australian politician.

He was born in Ballyreach in Ireland; his father was James Coulter Booth. He arrived in New South Wales in 1867, and after a short period at Kiama he moved to Sydney to work with the Wesleyan schools in Surry Hills. From 1868 he was a qualified teacher. On 13 November 1869 he married Priscella Jane Corbett at Enniskillen. He taught at West Leichhardt Public School from 1883 to 1894, at Fort Street Lower Public School from 1894 to 1898, and at North Newtown Public School from 1898 to 1904, when he was elected to the New South Wales Legislative Assembly as the Liberal member for Leichhardt. He was defeated in 1907, and subsequently worked as a real estate agent. Booth died in 1918 at Leichhardt.

New South Wales Legislative Assembly
Preceded by John Hawthorne	Member for Leichhardt; 1904–1907	Succeeded by Campbell Carmichael
