= John Keegan (Australian politician) =

Australian politician

John Walter Keegan (30 June (?) 1867 – 25 August 1941) was an Australian trade unionist and member of the New South Wales Legislative Council.

Born at Bulldog (also known as Illabarook) in Victoria to miner John Walter Keegan and Mary, née Flood, he worked as a local agent for the Australian Workers' Union at Wyalong in the 1890s. His brother, Tom Keegan, was an organiser for William Holman and would later become a member of the New South Wales Legislative Assembly.

John was elected to the New South Wales Legislative Council in 1925 as a Labor Party councillor. he was also a longtime member and official of the Amalgamated Society of Carpenters and Joiners. He moved to Sydney due to his third wife's illness in 1925 and worked for Sydney Municipal Council until he fractured his elbow. He supported the Legislative Council's abolition in accordance with party policy and focused on child endowment and workers' compensation in the council.

He found work with the Department of Public Works and became a gardener in the Botanic Gardens, but in 1927 he was dismissed by Agriculture Minister Harold Thorby, who allegedly found workers engaged in political business during their shifts. He gradually came to oppose Jack Lang's leadership and did not renominate for the newly reconstituted Council in 1934. He ran for the 1934 federal election as the Federal Labor candidate for Parramatta and for the state seat of Annandale in 1935. He died in 1941.
