= Bob Gorman =

Australian politician (1898–1970)

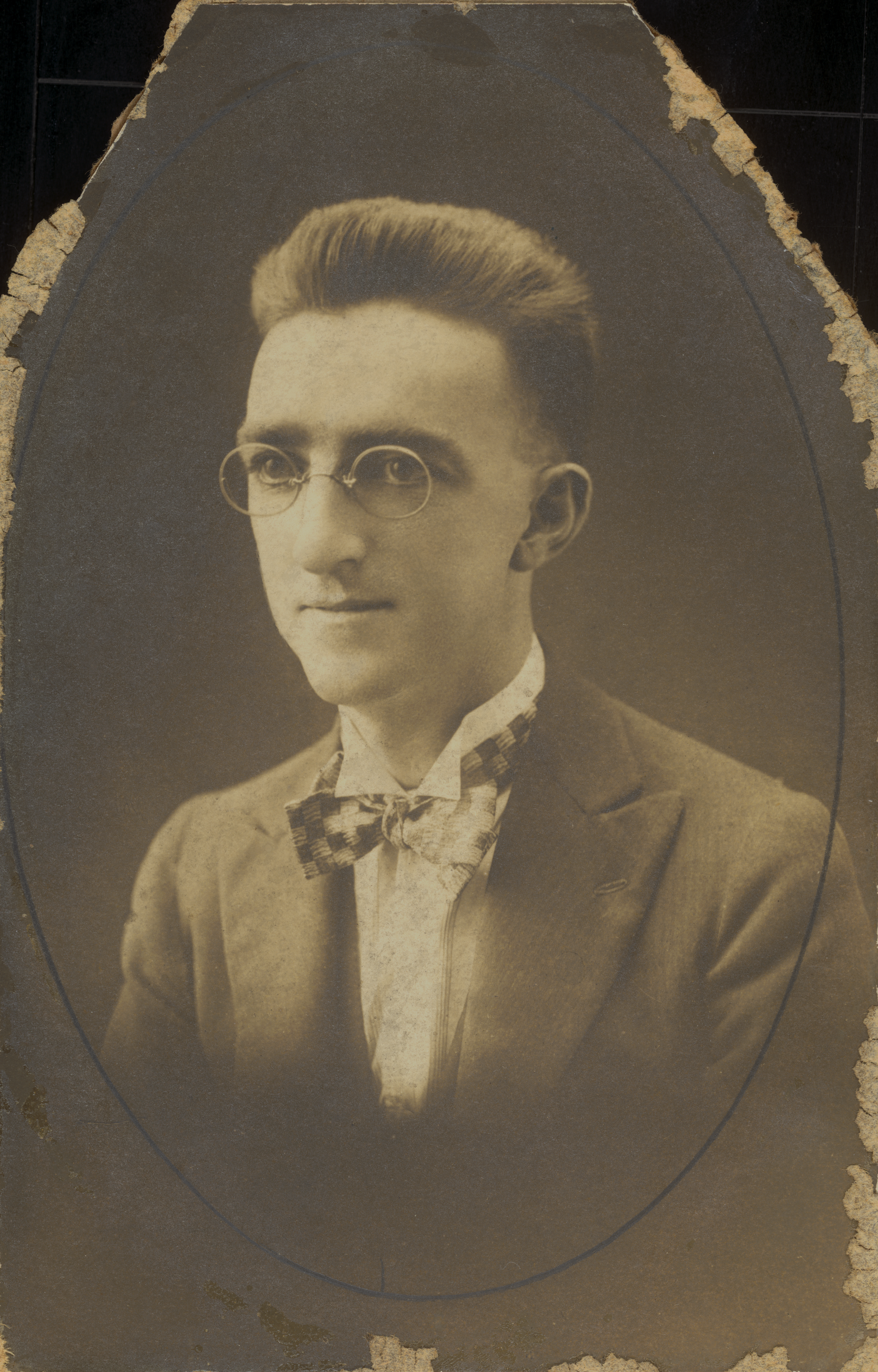
- Gorman in 1930

Personal details
- Born: 1 May 1898 Glebe, New South Wales
- Died: 2 November 1970 (aged 72) Glebe, New South Wales
- Party: Australian Labor Party (New South Wales Branch), Australian Labor Party (NSW), Australian Labor Party (Non-Communist)

Robert Douglas Gorman (1 May 1898 – 2 November 1970) was an Australian politician and a member of the New South Wales Legislative Assembly between 1933 and 1950. During his parliamentary career he was, at various times a member of the Labor Party, the Australian Labor Party (NSW) and the Australian Labor Party (Non-Communist).

== Early life ==
Gorman was born in Glebe, New South Wales and was the son of a master mariner. He was educated at the Patrician Brothers' School, Glebe and became a warehouseman and commercial traveller. After 1919, he became an officer of the Shop Assistants Union. Gorman was elected as an alderman of Glebe Municipal Council from 1926 until 1934 and was the mayor in 1933.

== State Parliament ==
Gorman was elected to parliament as the Lang Labor member for Annandale at the June 1933 by-election caused by the death of the incumbent Lang Labor member Robert Stuart-Robertson. Gorman retained the seat until it was abolished by a redistribution at the 1950 election. He then attempted to gain Labor pre-selection for the new seat of Newtown-Annandale but was defeated by Arthur Greenup. Gorman was a supporter of the Australian Labor Party (Non-Communist) during the short existence of that manifestation of Lang Labor and was the acting Chairman of Committees (effectively Deputy Speaker) during 2 months in 1949 but did not hold other party, parliamentary or ministerial offices. On leaving parliament, he was appointed as a Commissioner of the Industrial Relations Commission of New South Wales and held that position until he retired in 1963.

Civic offices
Preceded by James Diver	Mayor of The Glebe; 1932 – 1933	Succeeded by Matthew Fitzpatrick
New South Wales Legislative Assembly
Preceded by Robert Stuart-Robertson	Member for Annandale; 1933 – 1950	District abolished
