= 1932 New South Wales state election =

- 11 June 1932

All 90 seats in the New South Wales Legislative Assembly 46 Assembly seats were needed for a majority
- Registered: 1,465,008
- Turnout: 1,336,827 (96.40%) (▲1.46 pp)
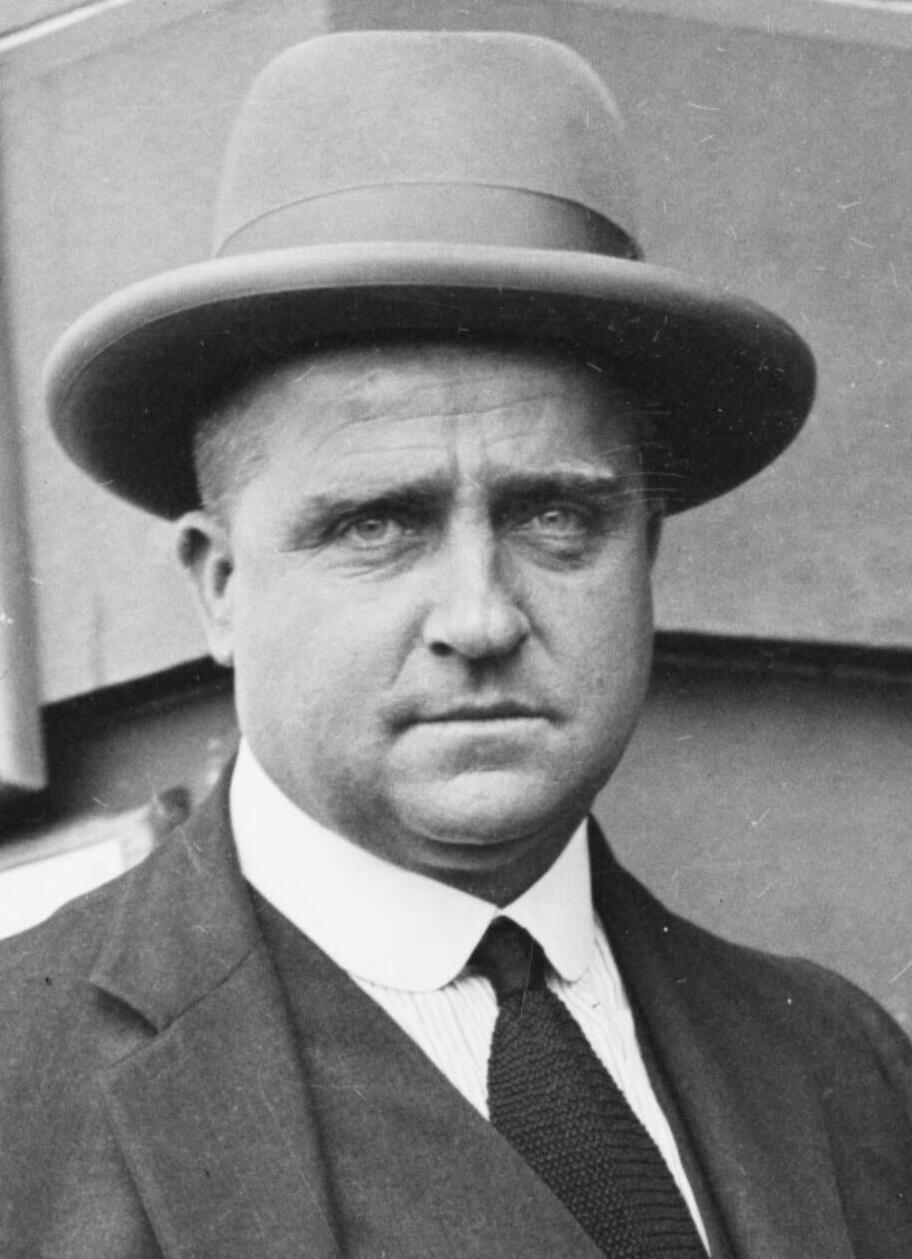

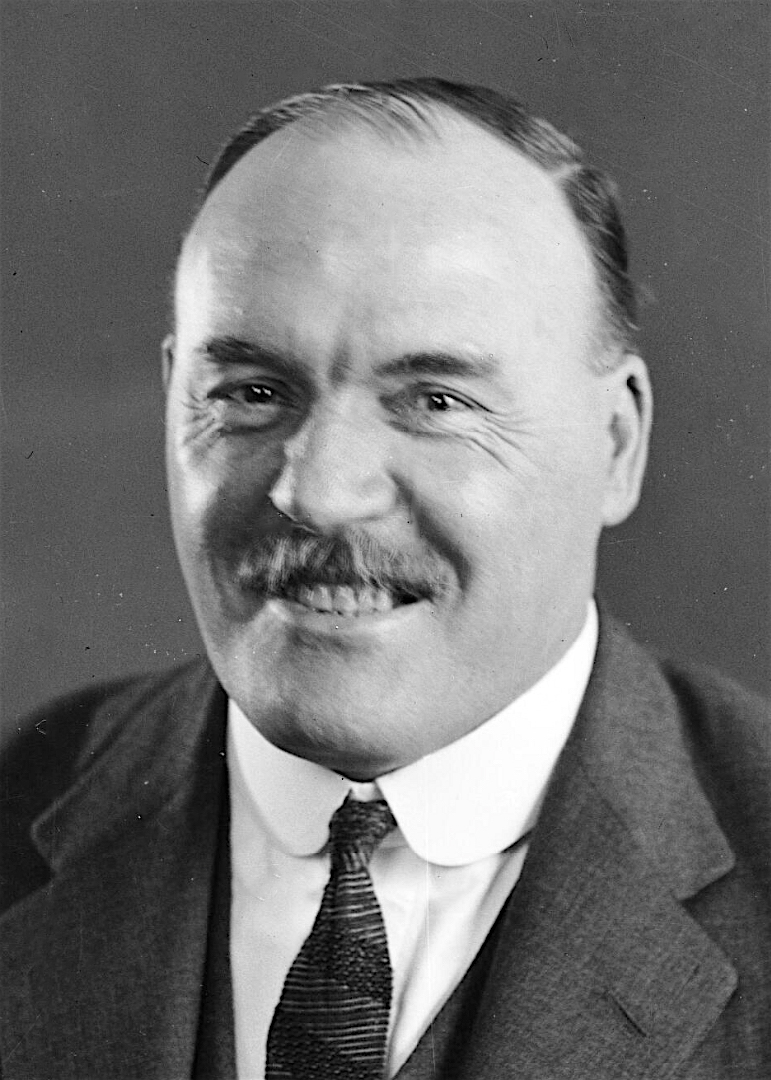

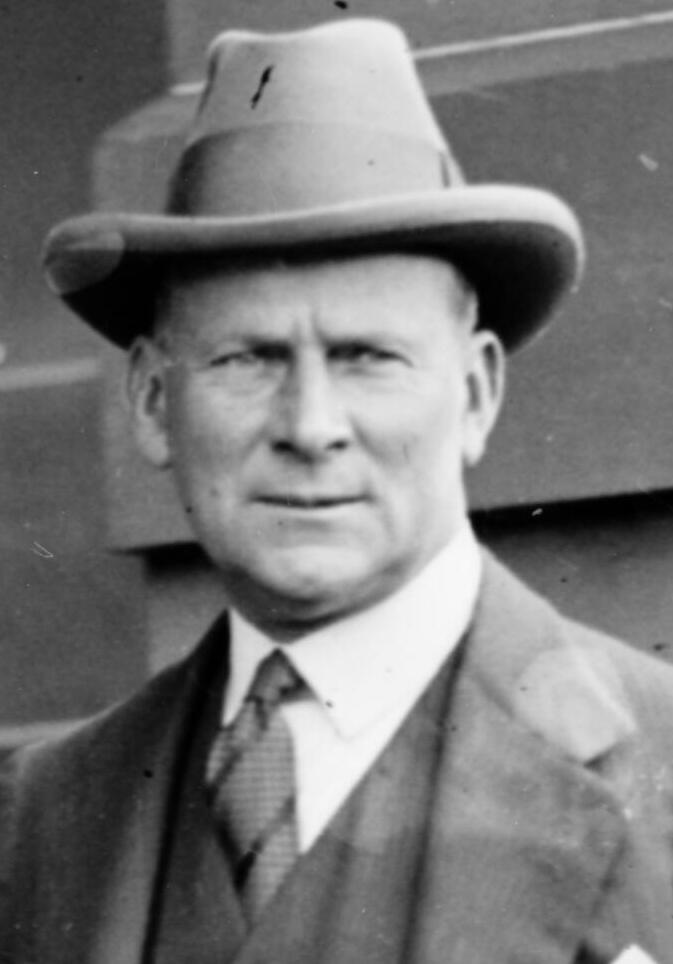
	First party	Second party	Third party
Leader	Bertram Stevens	Jack Lang	Michael Bruxner
Party	United Australia	Lang Labor	Country
Leader since	5 April 1932	31 July 1923	27 April 1932
Leader's seat	Croydon	Auburn	Tenterfield
Last election	New party	55 seats, 55.05%	12 seats, 9.56%
Seats won	41	24	23
Seat change	▲41	▼31	▲11
Popular vote	491,124	536,897	175,862
Percentage	36.74%	40.16%	13.16%
Swing	▲36.74%	▼14.89%	▲3.6%
- Results by division for the Legislative Assembly, shaded by winning party's margin of victory.

- Composition of New South Wales Legislative Assembly following the election.
Premier before election
Bertram Stevens
United Australia
Elected Premier
Bertram Stevens
United Australia

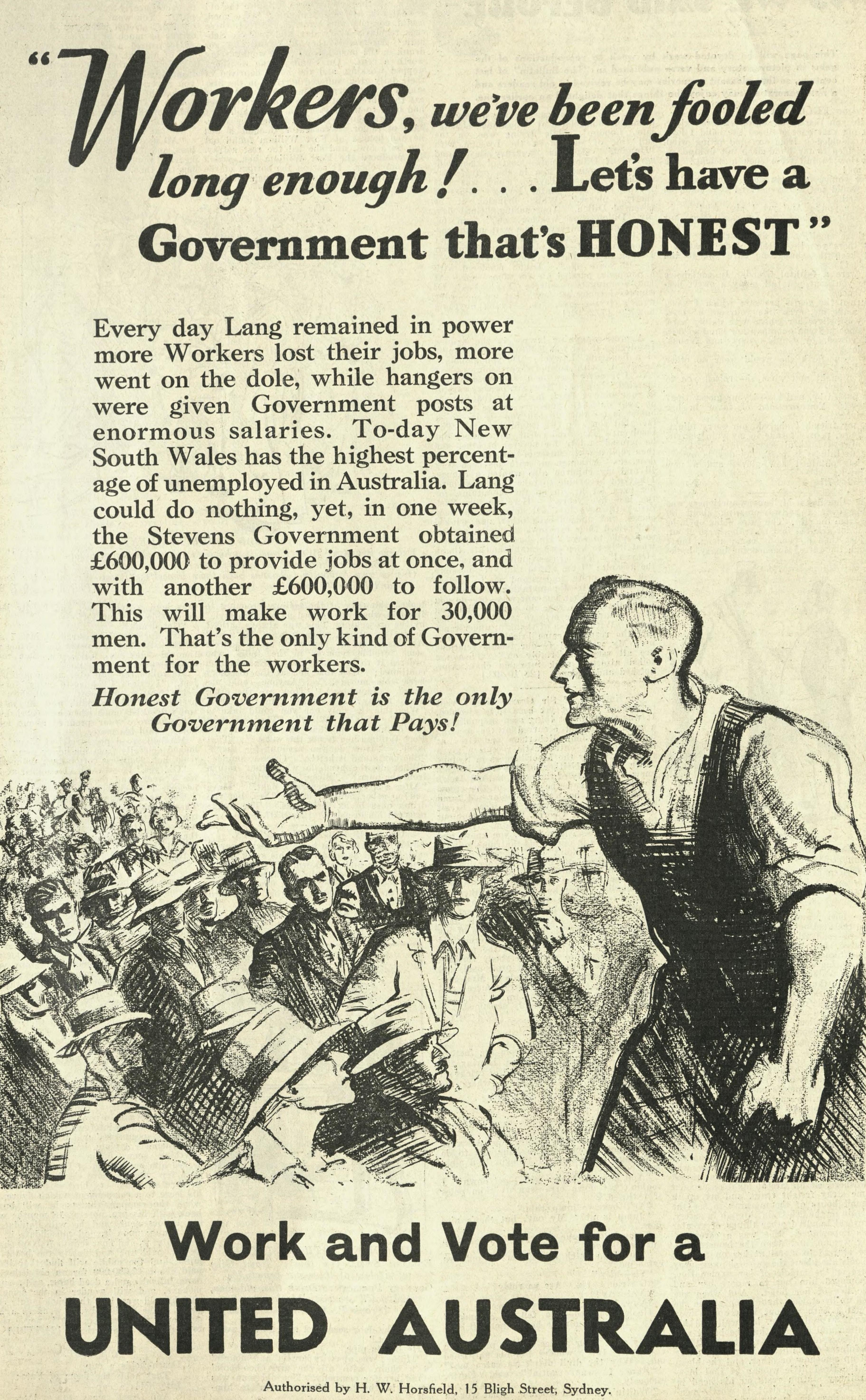
UAP advertisement published in The Bulletin a few weeks before the election

The 1932 New South Wales state election was held on 11 June 1932. This election was for all of the 90 seats in the 30th New South Wales Legislative Assembly and it was conducted in single member constituencies with compulsory preferential voting (Instant-runoff voting). The election resulted in a landslide victory for the UAP/Country Party coalition of Bertram Stevens, which won an 18-seat majority in the legislature.

The 29th parliament of New South Wales was dissolved on 18 May 1932 after the Governor, Sir Philip Game dismissed the Premier Jack Lang (see the crisis of 1931–32) and commissioned Bertram Stevens to form a caretaker government. Lang's government had a majority of 20 at the time of the dismissal. In this election, the Australian Labor Party (NSW) and the Federal Executive of the Australian Labor Party, which had separated in 1931 (see Lang Labor), endorsed separate candidates. The ALP (Federal) had candidates in 43 seats but none were elected. The parties were re-united in 1936.

The campaign was marked by mass Labor Party public meetings including, allegedly, the largest public meeting in Australian history when Lang addressed 200,000 people at Moore Park on 5 June. Despite this high level of support, Labor's elected caucus was halved, cut to only 24 seats.

== Key dates ==
Date	Event
13 May 1932	Third Lang ministry dismissed by the Governor of New South Wales, Philip Game and Bertram Stevens appointed Premier.
16 May 1932	Balance of first Stevens ministry appointed.
18 May 1932	The Legislative Assembly was dissolved, and writs were issued by the Governor to proceed with an election.
25 May 1932	Nominations for candidates for the election closed at noon.
11 June 1932	Polling day.
23 June 1932	Opening of 30th Parliament.

== Results ==
New South Wales state election, 11 June 1932 Legislative Assembly << 1930–1935 >>
Enrolled voters	1,418,141 (Note: Of the 1,465,008 enrolled voters, 46,867 were enrolled in three electorates that were uncontested at the election (one UAP-held and two Country-held).)				
Votes cast	1,336,827		Turnout	96.40	–1.46
Informal votes	30,260		Informal	2.21	–0.04
Summary of votes by party
Party	Primary votes	%	Swing	Seats	Change
Labor (NSW)	536,897	40.16	–14.89	24	–31
United Australia	491,124	36.74	+6.24 (Note: The swing figures for the United Australia Party (and independent UAP candidates) are calculated using the Nationalist Party's figures at the previous election.)	41	+18
Country	175,862	13.16	+3.60	23	+11
Federal Labor	56,641	4.24	+4.24	0	±0
Country–UAP (joint endorsement)	23,020	1.72	+1.72	2	+2
Communist	12,351	0.92	+0.13	0	±0
Independent Country	9,696	0.73	+0.48	0	±0
Ind. United Australia	9,088	0.68	+0.61	0	±0
All for Australia	3,806	0.28	+0.28	0	±0
Independent Labor	1,915	0.14	–0.40	0	±0
Women's Candidate	704	0.05	+0.05	0	±0
Independents	15,723	1.18	+0.01	0	±0
Total	1,336,827			90	

Popular vote
Labor (NSW)	40.16%
United	36.74%
Country	13.16%
Federal Labor	4.24%
Country–UAP	1.72%
Others	3.98%
Parliamentary seats
Labor (NSW)	24
United	41
Country	23
Federal Labor	0
Country–UAP	2
Others	0

== Changing seats ==
Seats changing hands
Seat	1930		1932	
Seat	Party	Member	Member	Party
Albury	Labor (NSW)	Joseph Fitzgerald	Alexander Mair	United Australia
Arncliffe	Labor (NSW)	Joseph Cahill	Horace Harper	United Australia
Ashburnham	Labor (NSW)	William Keast	Hilton Elliott	Country
Barwon	Labor (NSW)	Bill Ratcliffe (Note: Bill Ratcliffe retired.)	Ben Wade	Country
Bathurst	Labor (NSW)	Gus Kelly	Gordon Wilkins	United Australia-Country
Bondi	Labor (NSW)	Abe Landa	Norman Thomas	United Australia
Canterbury	Labor (NSW)	Arthur Tonge	Edward Hocking	United Australia
Castlereagh	Labor (NSW)	Joseph Clark	Alfred Yeo	Country
Concord	Labor (NSW)	Henry McDicken	Stan Lloyd	United Australia
Cootamundra	Labor (NSW)	Ken Hoad	Bill Ross	Country
Corowa	Nationalist	Richard Ball (Note: Nationalist Richard Ball joined Country.)	Richard Ball	Country
Drummoyne	Labor (NSW)	David McLelland	John Lee	United Australia
Dubbo	Labor (NSW)	Alfred McClelland	George Wilson	Country
Dulwich Hill	Labor (NSW)	Frank Connors	John Ness	United Australia
George's River	Labor (NSW)	Ted Kinsella	Cecil Monro	United Australia
Goulburn	Labor (NSW)	Jack Tully	Peter Loughlin	United Australia
Granville	Labor (NSW)	Bill Ely	Claude Fleck	United Australia
Hurstville	Labor (NSW)	Walter Butler	James Webb	United Australia
Kogarah	Labor (NSW)	Mark Gosling	James Ross	United Australia
Maitland	Labor (NSW)	Walter O'Hearn	Walter Howarth	United Australia
Mudgee	Labor (NSW)	Bill Dunn	David Spring	United Australia-Country
Murray	Labor (NSW)	John Donovan	Joe Lawson	Country
Murrumbidgee	Labor (NSW)	Martin Flannery	Robert Hankinson	Country
Namoi	Labor (NSW)	William Scully	Colin Sinclair	Country
North Sydney	Labor (NSW)	Ben Howe	Hubert Primrose	United Australia
Orange	Labor (NSW)	William Folster	Alwyn Tonking	United Australia
Parramatta	Labor (NSW)	Joseph Byrne	George Gollan	United Australia
Petersham	Labor (NSW)	Joe Lamaro	Eric Solomon	United Australia
Randwick	Labor (NSW)	Jack Flanagan	Arthur Moverly	United Australia
Ryde	Labor (NSW)	Evan Davies	Eric Spooner	United Australia
Upper Hunter	Nationalist	William Cameron (Note: William Cameron (Nationalist) died and Malcolm Brown (Independent Country) won the resulting by-election, standing as a Country candidate at this election.)	Malcolm Brown	Country
Waverley	Labor (NSW)	William Clementson	John Waddell	United Australia
Young	Labor (NSW)	Clarrie Martin	Albert Reid	Country

== See also ==
- Members of the New South Wales Legislative Assembly, 1932–1935
- Candidates of the 1932 New South Wales state election

== Bibliography ==
- Nairn, Bede (1995). Jack Lang the 'Big Fella':Jack Lang and the Australian Labor Party 1891–1949. Melbourne University Press Melbourne. ISBN 0522846963. OCLC 34416531.
