= Claude Matthews (Australian politician) =

Australian politician

The Honourable Claude Matthews
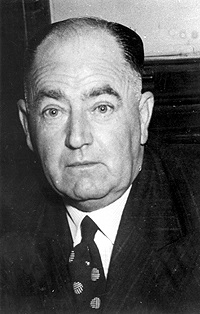

Chief Secretary
- In office 21 September 1949 – 30 June 1950
- Preceded by: John Baddeley
- Succeeded by: Clive Evatt

Personal details
- Born: 19 January 1899 Rylstone, New South Wales
- Died: 9 January 1954 (aged 54) Sydney
- Party: Labor Party, Australian Labor Party (NSW)

Claude Hilton Matthews (19 January 1899 – 9 January 1954) was an Australian politician and a member of the New South Wales Legislative Assembly from 1934 until his death in 1954 . He was variously a member of the Labor Party (ALP) and the Australian Labor Party (NSW). He held a number of ministerial positions including Chief Secretary

== Early and personal life ==
Matthews was born in Rylstone, New South Wales He was the son of a foreman and was educated at Petersham High School. He worked with the New South Wales Government Railways as a labourer and became an official of the Federated Ironworkers' Association.

== State Parliament ==
Matthews was elected as the Labor member for Leichhardt at the 1934 by-election caused by the resignation of the sitting member Joe Lamaro who unsuccessfully contested the seat of Watson at the 1934 federal election. He retained the seat for the next 7 elections. He killed himself while still in office in 1954.

== Government ==
Matthews held ministerial positions in the government of James McGirr. He held the positions of minister for building materials and minister for tourism and immigration before becoming colonial secretary between 1949 and 1950.

New South Wales Legislative Assembly
Preceded by Joe Lamaro	Member for Leichhardt; 1934 – 1954	Succeeded by Reg Coady
Political offices
New portfolio	Minister for Building Materials; 1947 – 1948	Succeeded by William Dickson
Preceded by Frank Finnan	Minister in Charge of Tourist Activities and Immigration; 1948 – 1949	Succeeded by Joshua Arthur
Preceded by Jack Baddeley	Chief Secretary; 1949 – 1950	Succeeded by Clive Evatt
