= Electoral district of Annandale =

Former state electoral district of New South Wales, Australia

Annandale New South Wales—Legislative Assembly
- State: New South Wales
- Created: 1894–1920, 1927
- Abolished: 1950
- Namesake: Annandale

Annandale was an electoral district of the Legislative Assembly in the Australian state of New South Wales, created in 1894, with the abolition of multi-member constituencies, from part of Balmain, and named after and including the Sydney suburb of Annandale. With the introduction of proportional representation, it was absorbed into the multi-member electorate of Balmain. It was recreated in 1927, but was abolished in 1950, and partly replaced by Newtown-Annandale.

== Members for Annandale ==
The seat was first held by the Free Trade Party's William Mahony who won the inaugural election in 1894 without an absolute majority. He won the following election in 1895 with an increased swing of 22%. The 1898 election saw Mahony returned with a reduced majority. He also defeated Isaiah Reginald Cohen, a candidate he would go on defeat a further two times. Prior to the first election after federation in 1901, the Free Trade and Protectionist parties merged to form the Liberal Reform Party. Mahony, standing as a Liberal Reformist, defeated the Progressive's Cohen. In 1904, Mahony was returned again and won over 60% of vote for first time. At the 1907 election, Mahony won his sixth and final election. After 16 years of representing Annandale, he retired from state politics on 14 September 1910.

The 1910 election was by won by the Liberal Reformist Albert Bruntnell, the former member for Surry Hills, who defeated Labor's George Davidson. This was the first time that a Labor candidate had contested the seat. At the election of 1913, Bruntnell was defeated by Labor's Arthur Hill Griffith who was sitting member for Sturt.

== Members ==
First incarnation (1894–1920)
Member	Party	Term
William Mahony	Free Trade	1894–1901
William Mahony	Liberal Reform	1901–1910
Albert Bruntnell	Liberal Reform	1910–1913
Arthur Griffith	Labor	1913–1916
Arthur Griffith	Independent Labor	1916–1917
William O'Brien	Labor	1917–1920
Second incarnation (1927–1950)
Robert Stuart-Robertson	Labor	1927–1933
Bob Gorman	Labor	1933–1940
Bob Gorman	Labor (N-C)	1940–1941
Bob Gorman	Labor	1941–1950

== See also ==
- Electoral results for the district of Annandale
