= Electoral district of Leichhardt (New South Wales) =

Former state electoral district of New South Wales, Australia

Leichhardt was an electoral district of the Legislative Assembly in the Australian state of New South Wales, created in 1894, with the abolition of multi-member electorates and partly replacing Balmain, and named after and including the Sydney suburb of Leichhardt. With the introduction of proportional representation, it was absorbed into the multi-member electorate of Western Suburbs. It was recreated in 1927, but was abolished in 1962.

== Members for Leichhardt ==
First incarnation (1894–1920)
Member	Party	Term
John Hawthorne	Ind. Free Trade	1894–1895
John Hawthorne	Free Trade	1895–1901
John Hawthorne	Liberal Reform	1901–1904
Robert Booth	Liberal Reform	1904–1907
Campbell Carmichael	Labor	1907–1919
Campbell Carmichael	Soldiers & Citizens	1919–1920
Second incarnation (1927–1962)
Member	Party	Term
Barney Olde	Labor	1927–1932
Joe Lamaro	Labor	1932–1934
Claude Matthews	Labor	1934–1940
Claude Matthews	Labor (N-C)	1940–1941
Claude Matthews	Labor	1941–1954
Reg Coady	Labor	1954–1962

== Election results ==
1959 New South Wales state election: Leichhardt
Party	Candidate	Votes	%	±%
Labor	Reg Coady	12,726	61.6	
Liberal	Barney Morton	7,948	38.4	
Total formal votes		20,674	98.3	
Informal votes		358	1.7	
Turnout		21,032	92.4	
Labor hold		Swing		
