= Federal Labor Party (NSW) =

Federal Labor
- Founded: 1931
- Dissolved: 1936
- National affiliation: Australian Labor Party

The Federal Labor Party were the members of the Australian Labor Party in the state of New South Wales who supported the federal party leadership in the split with the state Labor party which broke away in 1931. Federal Labor retained some seats in the Parliament of Australia but was a minor party in state elections. The dispute was healed in 1936.

== History ==
The Australian Labor Party was badly divided over how to respond to the Great Depression in Australia. In 1931 the federal government of James Scullin and most of the state premiers agreed the Premiers' Plan, a deflationary economic policy. However Jack Lang, the Premier of New South Wales, opposed the plan and instead advocated defaulting on debt payments and an inflationary approach. Lang was highly dominant in the New South Wales branch of the party and thus much of the organisation supported him in disputes with the federal leadership. In early 1931 Eddie Ward, a supporter of Lang, won a by-election for Labor but was refused entry to the federal Labor caucus; in response Ward and other Lang supporters formed a "Lang Labor" group on the crossbenches. Labor had also split on the right, with Joseph Lyons leading a section into the new United Australia Party. In November 1931 the Lang Labor MPs joined the opposition in defeating the Scullin government in parliament, causing the 1931 federal election. At the election the state and federal branches fielded rival candidates, with the state pro Lang candidates known as Australian Labor Party (New South Wales) and the federal pro Scullin candidates known as Federal Labor and headed by future Prime Minister Ben Chifley. Labor was heavily defeated at the election, losing most of its seats in New South Wales. Of the survivors, four supported Lang and three Scullin.

In the state Labor party, Lang had secured heavy support and thus the entire state caucus remained loyal. Lang was controversially dismissed from office in May 1932 and Labor would not return to power until 1941. Federal Labor candidates contested the 1932 and 1935 state elections but won no seats. In February 1936 new federal Labor leader John Curtin oversaw a reunification of the rival Labor parties.

== Election results ==
=== Federal ===
Results are for New South Wales only.

Election	Seats won	±	Total votes	%	Position
1931	3 / 28	▼17	214,973	16.8%	Opposition
1934	1 / 28	▼2	140,700	10.3%	Opposition

=== State ===
Election	Seats won	±	Total votes	%	Position
1932	0 / 90	0	56,641	4.24%	Not in chamber
1935	0 / 90	0	59,694	4.75%	Not in chamber
