= Candidates of the 1920 New South Wales state election =

This is a list of candidates for the 1920 New South Wales state election. The election was held on 20 March 1920. The election was the first of three conducted under the system of proportional representation; as a result, it is not possible to estimate the notional pre-election numbers.

== Retiring Members ==
=== Labor ===
- Claude Bushell MLA (Lyndhurst)
- John Cochran MLA (Darling Harbour)

=== Nationalist ===
- Alfred Edden MLA (Kahibah)
- James Fallick MLA (Singleton)
- David Hall MLA (Enmore) — appointed to the Legislative Council
- John Hunt MLA (Camden)
- William Latimer MLA (Woollahra) — appointed to the Legislative Council
- Charles Lee MLA (Tenterfield)
- George McDonald MLA (Bingara) — appointed to the Legislative Council
- John Perry MLA (Byron)
- William Robson MLA (Ashfield) — appointed to the Legislative Council
- David Storey MLA (Randwick) — appointed to the Legislative Council
- William Thompson MLA (Ryde)

=== Independent ===
- Alexander Graff MLA (Drummoyne) — elected as a Nationalist but became an independent in 1920

== Legislative Assembly ==
Sitting members are shown in bold text. Successful parties are highlighted in the relevant colour. Successful candidates are indicated by an asterisk (*).

Electorate	Vacancies	Labor candidates	Nationalist candidates	Progressive candidates	Soldiers and Citizens candidates	Other candidates
Balmain	5	**John Doyle***; **John Quirk***; **John Storey***; **Robert Stuart-Robertson***	Albert Smith*		**Campbell Carmichael**; George Saunders; Charles Shields	Solomon Amein (Ind); Peter Christensen (ISLP); William Corcoran (ISLP); Arthur Griffith (Ind); Charles Lawlor (Dem); Henry Levy (Ind); James Moroney (ISLP); George Nielsen (Ind); Herbert Weston (ISLP)
Balmain	5	**John Doyle***; **John Quirk***; **John Storey***; **Robert Stuart-Robertson***	Robert Stopford		**Campbell Carmichael**; George Saunders; Charles Shields	Solomon Amein (Ind); Peter Christensen (ISLP); William Corcoran (ISLP); Arthur Griffith (Ind); Charles Lawlor (Dem); Henry Levy (Ind); James Moroney (ISLP); George Nielsen (Ind); Herbert Weston (ISLP)
Balmain	5	**Tom Keegan**	Robert Stopford		**Campbell Carmichael**; George Saunders; Charles Shields	Solomon Amein (Ind); Peter Christensen (ISLP); William Corcoran (ISLP); Arthur Griffith (Ind); Charles Lawlor (Dem); Henry Levy (Ind); James Moroney (ISLP); George Nielsen (Ind); Herbert Weston (ISLP)
Bathurst	3	**James Dooley***; **Valentine Johnston***	**John Fitzpatrick***	Arthur Brown; Albert Rogers		James McIntyre (Ind)
Bathurst	3	John Gilchrist	Henry Camfield	Arthur Brown; Albert Rogers		James McIntyre (Ind)
Botany	5	**Frank Burke***; **Simon Hickey***; **William McKell***; **Thomas Mutch***	John Lee*	Charles Coghlan; Philip Strange-Mure	Charles Banks; Christopher Evers	Edward Connell (Dem); George Crowley (Ind); Henry Denford (ISLP); Jock Jamieson (ISLP); William McCristal (ISLP); Stanley McGowen (Ind); Patrick Quinn (Ind); Annie Toohey (ISLP)
Botany	5	**Frank Burke***; **Simon Hickey***; **William McKell***; **Thomas Mutch***	James Morrish	Charles Coghlan; Philip Strange-Mure	Charles Banks; Christopher Evers	Edward Connell (Dem); George Crowley (Ind); Henry Denford (ISLP); Jock Jamieson (ISLP); William McCristal (ISLP); Stanley McGowen (Ind); Patrick Quinn (Ind); Annie Toohey (ISLP)
Botany	5	Bill Ratcliffe	James Morrish	Charles Coghlan; Philip Strange-Mure	Charles Banks; Christopher Evers	Edward Connell (Dem); George Crowley (Ind); Henry Denford (ISLP); Jock Jamieson (ISLP); William McCristal (ISLP); Stanley McGowen (Ind); Patrick Quinn (Ind); Annie Toohey (ISLP)
Byron	3	Tom Swiney*	**George Nesbitt***	Stephen Perdriau*		James McDougall (Ind); William McKeever (Ind); Percy Tighe (Ind); Thomas Winterton (Ind); John Yates (Ind)
Byron	3	Roger Ryan	**William Zuill**	William Missingham; Duncan Nicholson		James McDougall (Ind); William McKeever (Ind); Percy Tighe (Ind); Thomas Winterton (Ind); John Yates (Ind)
Cootamundra	3	**Peter Loughlin***; **Greg McGirr***	Arthur D'Arcy; **William Holman**	Hugh Main*		
Cootamundra	3	**Peter Loughlin***; **Greg McGirr***	Arthur D'Arcy; **William Holman**	Hugh Brown; John Fitzpatrick		
Cootamundra	3	Charles Trefle	Arthur D'Arcy; **William Holman**	Hugh Brown; John Fitzpatrick		
Cumberland	3	Voltaire Molesworth*	Ernest Carr*; **Bruce Walker Sr***	Barton Addison; David Fitch	William Armstrong; Charles Hely	William Crittenden (Ind)
Cumberland	3	Francis Lagerlow; Albert Jones	Ernest Carr*; **Bruce Walker Sr***	Barton Addison; David Fitch	William Armstrong; Charles Hely	William Crittenden (Ind)
Cumberland	3	Francis Lagerlow; Albert Jones	William FitzSimons	Barton Addison; David Fitch	William Armstrong; Charles Hely	William Crittenden (Ind)
Eastern Suburbs	5	James Fingleton*; Bob O'Halloran*	Harold Jaques*; **Charles Oakes***	**James Macarthur-Onslow***	Alexander Hogan; Grace Scobie; Edgar Spencer; Frederick Winn-Walker	Sidney Buckleton (Ind); William Ross (Ind)
Eastern Suburbs	5	Scott Campbell (Note: Patrick Minahan and Scott Campbell were nominated by the Labor Party, however their endorsement was withdrawn before the polling day because they signed a pledge for the unconditional release of twelve imprisoned members of the Industrial Workers of the World.); Daniel Dwyer; Walter Humphries	James Mullaney; Henry Rogers; Charles Williams	Arthur Doran	Alexander Hogan; Grace Scobie; Edgar Spencer; Frederick Winn-Walker	Sidney Buckleton (Ind); William Ross (Ind)
Goulburn	3	**John Bailey***	**Augustus James***	Thomas Rutledge*		John Brogan (Ind); Percy Evans (Ind); Francis Grogan (Ind)
Goulburn	3	Richard Macdonald; Frank Morgan	**William Millard**	Patrick Bourke; Patrick O'Brien; William Tomkins		John Brogan (Ind); Percy Evans (Ind); Francis Grogan (Ind)
Maitland	3	Walter O'Hearn*	**William Cameron***	**Walter Bennett***		Joseph Compton (Ind); Thomas Hays (Ind)
Maitland	3	William Brennan; Dionysius McGuire	Stephen Hungerford; **Charles Nicholson**	William Roberts Cecil Tindale		Joseph Compton (Ind); Thomas Hays (Ind)
Murray	3	**William O'Brien***	**Richard Ball***	**George Beeby***		
Murray	3	Edmund Clear; Claude Thompson	**Arthur Manning**	Matthew Kilpatrick		
Murrumbidgee	3	Martin Flannery*	**Arthur Grimm***	**Ernest Buttenshaw***		Herbert Hawkins (Ind); **Patrick McGarry** (Ind Nat); Andrew Stewart (Ind)
Murrumbidgee	3	George Bodkin; **Patrick McGirr**		William Adams; Herbert Cuthbert; William Killen		Herbert Hawkins (Ind); **Patrick McGarry** (Ind Nat); Andrew Stewart (Ind)
Namoi	3	Patrick Scully*	**Frank Chaffey***	**Walter Wearne***		Robert Levien (Ind)
Namoi	3	Thomas Boland; William Scully	**John Crane**	Frank Heywood; Charles Woollett		Robert Levien (Ind)
Newcastle	5	Hugh Connell*; **John Estell***; **William Kearsley***	John Fegan*	Roland Green		**Arthur Gardiner*** (Ind)
Newcastle	5	Hugh Connell*; **John Estell***; **William Kearsley***	George O'Brien; John Paton	Roland Green		Joseph Charlton (ISLP); Michael Dillon (Ind); **William Grahame** (Ind Nat); Thomas Johnston (ISLP); John Kingsborough (Ind); Robert Mackenzie (Dem); John McDonald (ISLP); David McNeill (ISLP); William North (ISLP)
Newcastle	5	Amram Lewis; David Murray	George O'Brien; John Paton	Roland Green		Joseph Charlton (ISLP); Michael Dillon (Ind); **William Grahame** (Ind Nat); Thomas Johnston (ISLP); John Kingsborough (Ind); Robert Mackenzie (Dem); John McDonald (ISLP); David McNeill (ISLP); William North (ISLP)
North Shore	5	Cecil Murphy*	**Richard Arthur***; **Arthur Cocks***; **Reginald Weaver***	Frank Farnell; Francis Killeen; Archie Ogilvy; Arthur Walker	Edward Cortis; Richard Fitz-Gerald	Alfred Reid* (Ind Nat)
North Shore	5	Alexander Campbell; Albert Roberts; Alfred Warton; Henry Willis	**Richard Arthur***; **Arthur Cocks***; **Reginald Weaver***	Frank Farnell; Francis Killeen; Archie Ogilvy; Arthur Walker	Edward Cortis; Richard Fitz-Gerald	Mary Booth (WP); Frederick Clancy (Ind); Edward Clark (Ind); Timothy O'Donoghue (Dem)
North Shore	5	Alexander Campbell; Albert Roberts; Alfred Warton; Henry Willis	**Percy Colquhoun**; Richard Lambton	Frank Farnell; Francis Killeen; Archie Ogilvy; Arthur Walker	Edward Cortis; Richard Fitz-Gerald	Mary Booth (WP); Frederick Clancy (Ind); Edward Clark (Ind); Timothy O'Donoghue (Dem)
Northern Tableland	3	Alfred McClelland*	Leonard Francis; **Herbert Lane**	Michael Bruxner*; David Drummond*		
Northern Tableland	3	Joseph Byrne	Leonard Francis; **Herbert Lane**	Michael Bruxner*; David Drummond*		
Northern Tableland	3	Joseph Byrne	Leonard Francis; **Herbert Lane**	John Crapp; Patrick Little; **Follett Thomas**		
Oxley	3	Joseph Fitzgerald*	**Henry Morton**	**George Briner***; **Richard Price***		Edward Hill (Ind); Eugene Rudder (Ind)
Oxley	3	John Culbert; Robert Pinkerton	**Henry Morton**	**George Briner***; **Richard Price***		Edward Hill (Ind); Eugene Rudder (Ind)
Oxley	3	John Culbert; Robert Pinkerton	**Henry Morton**	Theodore Hill		Edward Hill (Ind); Eugene Rudder (Ind)
Parramatta	3	Bill Ely*; **Jack Lang***	**Albert Bruntnell***		Francis Silverstone; James Thomson; Richard Yeend	Alexander Finn (Dem); Harry Moss (Ind)
Parramatta	3	Bill Ely*; **Jack Lang***	Frederick Parkes		Francis Silverstone; James Thomson; Richard Yeend	Alexander Finn (Dem); Harry Moss (Ind)
Parramatta	3	Edward Pomfret	Frederick Parkes		Francis Silverstone; James Thomson; Richard Yeend	Alexander Finn (Dem); Harry Moss (Ind)
Ryde	5	Robert Greig*	David Anderson*; **Sir Thomas Henley***	**Thomas Bavin***	Maurice Dearn; Charles Laseron; David Morgan; John Pattison; Francis Russell	Edward Loxton* (Ind Nat)
Ryde	5	Henry Douglass; William Hutchison; Vernon Jarvis; Ernest Sheiles	David Anderson*; **Sir Thomas Henley***	Benjamin Gelling	Maurice Dearn; Charles Laseron; David Morgan; John Pattison; Francis Russell	Henry Bernard (Ind) Robin Levick (Ind)
Ryde	5	Henry Douglass; William Hutchison; Vernon Jarvis; Ernest Sheiles	Sydney Herring; Herbert Small	Benjamin Gelling	Maurice Dearn; Charles Laseron; David Morgan; John Pattison; Francis Russell	Henry Bernard (Ind) Robin Levick (Ind)
St George	5	**George Cann***; Mark Gosling*	**Guy Arkins***; **William Bagnall***	**Thomas Ley***	Charles Church; Charles Rider	Joseph Andrew (Ind); Sydney Cook (Ind); William O'Driscoll (Dem)
St George	5	**George Cann***; Mark Gosling*	**Guy Arkins***; **William Bagnall***	Sir Charles Rosenthal	Charles Church; Charles Rider	Joseph Andrew (Ind); Sydney Cook (Ind); William O'Driscoll (Dem)
St George	5	Patrick Donovan; William Gibbs; Sam Toombs	Frederick Reed	Sir Charles Rosenthal	Charles Church; Charles Rider	Joseph Andrew (Ind); Sydney Cook (Ind); William O'Driscoll (Dem)
Sturt	3	**Mat Davidson***	**Brian Doe***			**Percy Brookfield*** (ISLP)
Sturt	3	Walter Webb; **Jabez Wright**	John Thorn; Frank Wilkinson			Thomas Hynes (ISLP); John O'Reilly (ISLP)
Sydney	5	**John Birt***; **Arthur Buckley***; **Michael Burke***; Patrick Minahan*	**Daniel Levy***		John Clasby; James Ritchie; Charles Smith	Alfred Bartlett (Ind); Patrick Cleary (Dem); Patrick Craddock (Ind); Ernie Judd (ISLP); Daisy Loughran (ISLP); Edwin Miller (Ind); Richard Meagher (Ind); John O'Sullivan (Ind); Joseph Sydney (Ind); William Thomas (Ind)
Sydney	5	**John Birt***; **Arthur Buckley***; **Michael Burke***; Patrick Minahan*	Joseph Jackson		John Clasby; James Ritchie; Charles Smith	Alfred Bartlett (Ind); Patrick Cleary (Dem); Patrick Craddock (Ind); Ernie Judd (ISLP); Daisy Loughran (ISLP); Edwin Miller (Ind); Richard Meagher (Ind); John O'Sullivan (Ind); Joseph Sydney (Ind); William Thomas (Ind)
Sydney	5	**Tom Smith**	Joseph Jackson		John Clasby; James Ritchie; Charles Smith	Alfred Bartlett (Ind); Patrick Cleary (Dem); Patrick Craddock (Ind); Ernie Judd (ISLP); Daisy Loughran (ISLP); Edwin Miller (Ind); Richard Meagher (Ind); John O'Sullivan (Ind); Joseph Sydney (Ind); William Thomas (Ind)
Wammerawa	3	Joseph Clark*; **Bill Dunn***	**William Ashford***	William Harris; Neil McLennan; Harold Thorby		William Kelk (Ind); Edwin Utley (Ind); Sydney Webb (Ind)
Wammerawa	3	Joseph Clark*; **Bill Dunn***	Sidney Skuthorpe	William Harris; Neil McLennan; Harold Thorby		William Kelk (Ind); Edwin Utley (Ind); Sydney Webb (Ind)
Wammerawa	3	William Webster	Sidney Skuthorpe	William Harris; Neil McLennan; Harold Thorby		William Kelk (Ind); Edwin Utley (Ind); Sydney Webb (Ind)
Western Suburbs	5	**Carlo Lazzarini***; Edward McTiernan*	**Tom Hoskins***; **Sydney Shillington***	James Wilson*	Stanley Gelling; Thomas McVittie; John Ness; John Weekley	Peter Bowling (Ind); Alexander Huie (Ind); Daniel Noon (Dem); Benjamin Richards (Ind); Claude Sugden (Ind)
Western Suburbs	5	**Carlo Lazzarini***; Edward McTiernan*	**Tom Hoskins***; **Sydney Shillington***	Frederick Robins	Stanley Gelling; Thomas McVittie; John Ness; John Weekley	Peter Bowling (Ind); Alexander Huie (Ind); Daniel Noon (Dem); Benjamin Richards (Ind); Claude Sugden (Ind)
Western Suburbs	5	Frederick McDonald; Barney Olde; John Sheils	David Doull; Henry Garling	Frederick Robins	Stanley Gelling; Thomas McVittie; John Ness; John Weekley	Peter Bowling (Ind); Alexander Huie (Ind); Daniel Noon (Dem); Benjamin Richards (Ind); Claude Sugden (Ind)
Wollondilly	3	John Cleary*; **Billy Davies***	**Sir George Fuller***			Arthur Silvey-Reardon (Ind)
Wollondilly	3	John Cleary*; **Billy Davies***	**Mark Morton**			Arthur Silvey-Reardon (Ind)
Wollondilly	3	Daniel Chalker	**Mark Morton**			Arthur Silvey-Reardon (Ind)

== See also ==
- Members of the New South Wales Legislative Assembly, 1920–1922
- Results of the 1920 New South Wales state election
