= Electoral results for the district of Western Suburbs =

Results for state seat of Western Suburbs, New South Wales, Australia

Western Suburbs, an electoral district of the Legislative Assembly in the Australian state of New South Wales was created in 1920 and abolished in 1927.

Election	Member	Party	Member	Party	Member	Party	Member	Party	Member	Party
1920	Carlo Lazzarini	Labor	Edward McTiernan	Labor	Tom Hoskins	Nationalist	Sydney Shillington	Nationalist	James Wilson	Progressive
1922	Carlo Lazzarini	Labor	Edward McTiernan	Labor	Tom Hoskins	Nationalist	John Ness	Nationalist	James Wilson	Nationalist
1925	Carlo Lazzarini	Labor	Edward McTiernan	Labor	Tom Hoskins	Nationalist	John Ness	Nationalist	Milton Jarvie	Nationalist

== Election results ==
=== Elections in the 1920s ===
==== 1925 ====
1925 New South Wales state election: Western Suburbs
Party	Candidate	Votes	%	±%
Quota		8,320		
Nationalist	John Ness (elected 2)	9,016	18.1	+1.9
Nationalist	Tom Hoskins (elected 4)	6,975	14.0	−2.4
Nationalist	Milton Jarvie (elected 5)	3,980	8.0	+8.0
Nationalist	Henry Morton	2,443	4.9	+4.9
Nationalist	William Simpson	1,865	3.7	+0.6
Labor	Edward McTiernan (elected 1)	11,239	22.5	+3.2
Labor	Carlo Lazzarini (elected 3)	7,697	15.4	+1.3
Labor	Barney Olde	774	1.6	+1.6
Labor	James Troy	649	1.3	+1.3
Labor	Roger Ryan	99	0.2	+0.2
Independent	Alexander Huie	3,976	8.0	+2.6
Protestant Labour	Frederick Armstrong	578	1.2	+1.2
Protestant Labour	Alfred Millington	490	1.0	+1.0
Majority Labor	John Cain	133	0.3	+0.3
Total formal votes		49,914	97.5	+0.6
Informal votes		1,253	2.5	−0.6
Turnout		51,167	70.7	−3.3
Party total votes
Nationalist		24,279	48.6	−9.3
Labor		20,458	41.0	+5.0
Independent	Alexander Huie	3,976	8.0	+8.0
Protestant Labour		1,068	2.1	+2.1
Majority Labor		133	0.3	+0.3

==== 1922 ====
1922 New South Wales state election: Western Suburbs
Party	Candidate	Votes	%	±%
Quota		8,274		
Nationalist	Tom Hoskins (elected 3)	8,127	16.4	+3.3
Nationalist	John Ness (elected 4)	8,055	16.2	+16.2
Nationalist	James Wilson (elected 5)	7,082	14.3	+14.3
Nationalist	Sydney Shillington (defeated)	3,912	7.9	−3.3
Nationalist	William Simpson	1,554	3.1	+3.1
Labor	Edward McTiernan (elected 1)	9,598	19.3	+8.7
Labor	Carlo Lazzarini (elected 2)	6,986	14.1	+0.3
Labor	James Stewart	672	1.4	+1.4
Labor	Harold Macdonald	499	1.0	+1.0
Labor	Joseph Smith	97	0.2	+0.2
Progressive	Alexander Huie	2,670	5.4	+5.4
Progressive	Clare Wilson	388	0.8	+0.8
Total formal votes		49,640	96.9	+7.9
Informal votes		1,582	3.1	−7.9
Turnout		51,222	74.0	+16.2
Party total votes
Nationalist		28,730	57.9	+21.8
Labor		17,852	36.0	−0.4
Progressive		3,058	6.2	−2.0

==== 1920 ====
1920 New South Wales state election: Western Suburbs
Party	Candidate	Votes	%	±%
Quota		5,397		
Labor	Carlo Lazzarini (elected 1)	4,457	13.8	
Labor	Edward McTiernan (elected 2)	3,419	10.6	
Labor	Frederick McDonald	1,821	5.6	
Labor	Barney Olde	1,089	3.4	
Labor	John Sheils	993	3.1	
Nationalist	Tom Hoskins (elected 3)	4,236	13.1	
Nationalist	Sydney Shillington (elected 4)	3,643	11.2	
Nationalist	David Doull	2,064	6.4	
Nationalist	Henry Garling	1,759	5.4	
Progressive	James Wilson (elected 5)	2,423	7.5	
Progressive	Frederick Robins	237	0.7	
Soldiers & Citizens	John Ness	1,173	3.6	
Soldiers & Citizens	Stanley Gelling	216	0.7	
Soldiers & Citizens	Thomas McVittie	207	0.6	
Soldiers & Citizens	John Weekley	108	0.3	
Democratic	Daniel Noon	1,692	5.2	
Independent	Alexander Huie	1,268	3.9	
Independent	Benjamin Richards	813	2.5	
Independent	Peter Bowling	746	2.3	
Independent	Claude Sugden	16	0.1	
Total formal votes		32,380	89.0	
Informal votes		4,006	11.0	
Turnout		36,386	57.8	
Party total votes
Labor		11,779	36.4	
Nationalist		11,702	36.1	
Progressive		2,660	8.2	
Soldiers & Citizens		1,704	5.3	
Democratic		1,692	5.2	
Independent	Alexander Huie	1,268	3.9	
Independent	Benjamin Richards	813	2.5	
Independent	Peter Bowling	746	2.3	
Independent	Claude Sugden	16	0.1	
