= Results of the 1932 New South Wales state election =

State election for New South Wales, Australia in June 1932

New South Wales state election, 11 June 1932 Legislative Assembly << 1930–1935 >>
Enrolled voters	1,418,141 (Note: Of the 1,465,008 enrolled voters, 46,867 were enrolled in three electorates that were uncontested at the election (one UAP-held and two Country-held).)				
Votes cast	1,336,827		Turnout	96.40	–1.46
Informal votes	30,260		Informal	2.21	–0.04
Summary of votes by party
Party	Primary votes	%	Swing	Seats	Change
Labor (NSW)	536,897	40.16	–14.89	24	–31
United Australia	491,124	36.74	+6.24 (Note: The swing figures for the United Australia Party (and independent UAP candidates) are calculated using the Nationalist Party's figures at the previous election.)	41	+18
Country	175,862	13.16	+3.60	23	+11
Federal Labor	56,641	4.24	+4.24	0	±0
Country–UAP (joint endorsement)	23,020	1.72	+1.72	2	+2
Communist	12,351	0.92	+0.13	0	±0
Independent Country	9,696	0.73	+0.48	0	±0
Ind. United Australia	9,088	0.68	+0.61	0	±0
All for Australia	3,806	0.28	+0.28	0	±0
Independent Labor	1,915	0.14	–0.40	0	±0
Women's Candidate	704	0.05	+0.05	0	±0
Independents	15,723	1.18	+0.01	0	±0
Total	1,336,827			90	

The 1932 New South Wales state election was for 90 electoral districts each returning a single member with compulsory preferential voting.

== Results by electoral district ==
=== Albury ===
1932 New South Wales state election: Albury
Party	Candidate	Votes	%	±%
Labor (NSW)	Joseph Fitzgerald	4,803	40.1	+11.6
United Australia	Alexander Mair	3,674	30.6	+30.6
Country	John Ross	3,509	29.3	+29.3
Total formal votes		11,986	99.1	+1.1
Informal votes		112	0.9	−1.1
Turnout		12,098	96.2	+0.6
Two-party-preferred result
United Australia	Alexander Mair	6,964	58.1	
Labor (NSW)	Joseph Fitzgerald	5,022	41.9	
United Australia gain from Labor (NSW)		Swing	N/A	

=== Annandale ===
1932 New South Wales state election: Annandale
Party	Candidate	Votes	%	±%
Labor (NSW)	Robert Stuart-Robertson	9,937	63.1	−14.4
United Australia	Leo Bolsdon	4,614	29.3	+9.1
Federal Labor	Percival McDonald	977	6.2	+6.2
Communist	Robert Brechin	175	1.1	−1.2
Independent	Harry Meatheringham	22	0.1	+0.1
Independent	Christopher Hade	13	0.1	+0.1
Total formal votes		15,738	97.0	−0.6
Informal votes		484	3.0	+0.6
Turnout		16,222	95.6	+1.7
Labor (NSW) hold		Swing	N/A	

- Preferences were not distributed.

=== Armidale ===
1932 New South Wales state election: Armidale
Party	Candidate	Votes	%	±%
Country	David Drummond	8,164	66.2	+14.1
Labor (NSW)	Leonard Dawson	4,169	33.8	−14.1
Total formal votes		12,333	98.3	+1.3
Informal votes		218	1.7	−1.3
Turnout		12,551	96.5	−3.6
Country hold		Swing	+14.1	

=== Arncliffe ===
1932 New South Wales state election: Arncliffe
Party	Candidate	Votes	%	±%
United Australia	Horace Harper	8,692	48.3	+15.7
Labor (NSW)	Joseph Cahill	8,208	45.6	−20.7
Federal Labor	Patrick Coyne	932	5.2	+5.2
Communist	Frederick Farrall	173	1.0	−0.2
Total formal votes		18,005	98.5	+0.6
Informal votes		282	1.5	−0.6
Turnout		18,287	97.6	+2.2
Two-party-preferred result
United Australia	Horace Harper	9,280	51.5	
Labor (NSW)	Joseph Cahill	8,725	48.5	
United Australia gain from Labor (NSW)		Swing	N/A	

=== Ashburnham ===
1932 New South Wales state election: Ashburnham
Party	Candidate	Votes	%	±%
Labor (NSW)	William Keast	5,211	41.7	−7.6
Country	Hilton Elliott	4,175	33.4	+33.4
United Australia	Eric Pryor	2,474	19.8	−18.4
Ind. United Australia	Edmund Best	631	5.1	+5.1
Total formal votes		12,491	98.5	0.0
Informal votes		189	1.5	0.0
Turnout		12,680	97.1	+2.0
Two-party-preferred result
Country	Hilton Elliott	7,124	57.0	+57.0
Labor (NSW)	William Keast	5,367	43.0	−7.4
Country gain from Labor (NSW)		Swing	N/A	

=== Ashfield ===
1932 New South Wales state election: Ashfield
Party	Candidate	Votes	%	±%
United Australia	Milton Jarvie	11,658	72.3	+29.3
Labor (NSW)	Lancelot Stevenson	4,456	27.7	−10.1
Total formal votes		16,114	98.3	0.0
Informal votes		279	1.7	0.0
Turnout		16,393	96.4	−2.5
United Australia hold		Swing	+17.5	

=== Auburn ===
1932 New South Wales state election: Auburn
Party	Candidate	Votes	%	±%
Labor (NSW)	Jack Lang	9,233	52.0	−23.8
Federal Labor	Percy Coleman	7,075	39.9	+39.9
United Australia	Phillip Wilkins	1,316	7.4	−14.9
Communist	Lawrence Sharkey	112	0.6	−0.5
Independent	Theodore McLennan	19	0.1	+0.1
Total formal votes		17,755	97.6	+0.3
Informal votes		431	2.4	−0.3
Turnout		18,186	96.0	+0.3
Labor (NSW) hold		Swing	N/A	

=== Balmain ===
1932 New South Wales state election: Balmain
Party	Candidate	Votes	%	±%
Labor (NSW)	John Quirk	9,591	59.8	−16.2
Federal Labor	Peter Murray	5,329	33.2	+33.2
Independent	Arthur Arundel	720	4.5	+4.5
Communist	Joseph Crow	395	2.5	+2.5
Total formal votes		16,035	98.2	+0.8
Informal votes		286	1.8	−0.8
Turnout		16,321	96.8	+1.3
Labor (NSW) hold		Swing	N/A	

- Preferences were not distributed.

=== Bankstown ===
1932 New South Wales state election: Bankstown
Party	Candidate	Votes	%	±%
Labor (NSW)	James McGirr	9,674	48.1	−21.2
United Australia	John Byrne	7,420	36.9	+8.1
Federal Labor	John Metcalfe	1,553	7.7	+7.7
Ind. United Australia	Jacob Cook	1,145	5.7	+5.7
Communist	Michael Ryan	314	1.6	+0.5
Total formal votes		20,106	97.4	+0.8
Informal votes		546	2.6	−0.8
Turnout		20,652	96.2	−0.4
Two-party-preferred result
Labor (NSW)	James McGirr	10,608	52.8	
United Australia	John Byrne	9,498	47.2	
Labor (NSW) hold		Swing	N/A	

=== Barwon ===
1932 New South Wales state election: Barwon
Party	Candidate	Votes	%	±%
Country	Ben Wade	7,442	53.2	+14.4
Labor (NSW)	Edward Cummins	5,149	36.8	−13.1
Federal Labor	Lou Cunningham	1,395	10.0	+10.0
Total formal votes		13,986	98.6	+0.9
Informal votes		201	1.4	−0.9
Turnout		14,187	95.3	+0.2
Country gain from Labor (NSW)		Swing	N/A	

- Preferences were not distributed.

=== Bathurst ===
1932 New South Wales state election: Bathurst
Party	Candidate	Votes	%	±%
Country	Gordon Wilkins	6,441	49.0	+9.5
Labor (NSW)	Gus Kelly	6,239	47.4	−12.8
Independent	John Miller	366	2.8	+2.8
Independent	Eric Ingram	108	0.8	+0.8
Total formal votes		13,154	97.9	−0.2
Informal votes		288	2.1	+0.2
Turnout		13,442	97.7	+3.4
Two-party-preferred result
Country	Gordon Wilkins	6,732	51.2	
Labor (NSW)	Gus Kelly	6,422	48.8	
Country gain from Labor (NSW)		Swing	N/A	

- Gordon Wilkins was endorsed jointly by the Country and United Australia Parties.

=== Bondi ===
1932 New South Wales state election: Bondi
Party	Candidate	Votes	%	±%
United Australia	Norman Thomas	12,132	62.2	+19.4
Labor (NSW)	Abe Landa	6,330	32.5	−15.0
Federal Labor	James Buckingham	684	3.5	+3.5
Women's	Grace Scobie	233	1.2	+1.2
Communist	Archibald Smith	109	0.6	+0.6
Total formal votes		19,488	98.0	−0.7
Informal votes		387	2.0	+0.7
Turnout		19,875	96.2	+3.8
United Australia gain from Labor (NSW)		Swing	N/A	

- Preferences were not distributed.

=== Botany ===
1932 New South Wales state election: Botany
Party	Candidate	Votes	%	±%
Labor (NSW)	Bob Heffron	11,023	54.3	−9.2
United Australia	Trevor Levy	6,084	30.0	+30.0
Federal Labor	Frederick Kerr	3,013	14.8	+14.9
Communist	Basil Williams	175	0.9	0.0
Total formal votes		20,295	98.2	+0.6
Informal votes		361	1.8	−0.6
Turnout		20,656	96.8	+1.6
Labor (NSW) hold		Swing	N/A	

- Preferences were not distributed.

=== Bulli ===
1932 New South Wales state election: Bulli
Party	Candidate	Votes	%	±%
Labor (NSW)	Andrew Lysaght	7,590	62.8	−16.4
United Australia	Robert Roberts	3,634	30.1	+12.2
Federal Labor	Allan Howie	460	3.8	+3.8
Communist	Evred Bostick	404	3.3	+0.4
Total formal votes		12,088	98.8	+0.5
Informal votes		142	1.2	−0.5
Turnout		12,230	97.3	+2.7
Labor (NSW) hold		Swing	N/A	

- Preferences were not distributed.

=== Burwood ===
1932 New South Wales state election: Burwood
Party	Candidate	Votes	%	±%
United Australia	Thomas Henley	11,523	63.8	+19.6
Labor (NSW)	Horace Foley	5,930	32.8	−6.4
Ind. United Australia	Abraham Taylor	602	3.3	+3.3
Total formal votes		18,055	99.0	+1.5
Informal votes		183	1.0	−1.5
Turnout		18,238	96.0	−0.3
United Australia hold		Swing	N/A	

- Preferences were not distributed.

=== Byron ===
1932 New South Wales state election: Byron
Party	Candidate	Votes	%	±%
Country	Arthur Budd	9,733	78.8	−21.2
Labor (NSW)	Fred Crowther	2,613	21.2	+21.2
Total formal votes		12,346	98.2	
Informal votes		230	1.8	
Turnout		12,576	96.1	
Country hold		Swing	N/A	

=== Canterbury ===
1932 New South Wales state election: Canterbury
Party	Candidate	Votes	%	±%
Labor (NSW)	Arthur Tonge	8,458	46.6	−21.8
United Australia	Edward Hocking	8,256	45.5	+15.6
Federal Labor	George Bramston	1,353	7.5	+7.5
Communist	Robert Cram	80	0.4	+0.4
Total formal votes		18,147	98.3	−0.1
Informal votes		317	1.7	+0.1
Turnout		18,464	96.2	+2.2
Two-party-preferred result
United Australia	Edward Hocking	9,129	50.3	
Labor (NSW)	Arthur Tonge	9,018	49.7	
United Australia gain from Labor (NSW)		Swing	N/A	

=== Casino ===
1932 New South Wales state election: Casino
Party	Candidate	Votes	%	±%
Country	John Reid	9,078	74.1	+49.6
Labor (NSW)	James Fredericks	3,020	24.7	−4.5
Country	Henry McLaurin	148	1.2	+1.2
Total formal votes		12,246	97.3	+3.6
Informal votes		343	2.7	−3.6
Turnout		12,589	97.2	+1.5
Country hold		Swing	N/A	

- Preferences were not distributed.

=== Castlereagh ===
1932 New South Wales state election: Castlereagh
Party	Candidate	Votes	%	±%
Country	Alfred Yeo	6,635	50.6	+8.6
Labor (NSW)	Joseph Clark	5,420	41.3	−14.5
Federal Labor	Wilfred Turnbull	1,061	8.1	+8.1
Total formal votes		13,116	98.7	+0.9
Informal votes		172	1.3	−0.9
Turnout		13,288	96.2	+2.2
Country gain from Labor (NSW)		Swing	N/A	

- Preferences were not distributed.

=== Cessnock ===
1932 New South Wales state election: Cessnock
Party	Candidate	Votes	%	±%
Labor (NSW)	Jack Baddeley	12,596	73.5	−19.0
Federal Labor	Joseph Norton	3,656	21.3	+21.3
Communist	Henry Scanlon	877	5.1	−2.4
Total formal votes		17,129	96.7	+2.9
Informal votes		585	3.3	−2.9
Turnout		17,714	96.6	+0.6
Labor (NSW) hold		Swing	N/A	

=== Clarence ===
1932 New South Wales state election: Clarence
Party	Candidate	Votes	%	±%
Country	Alfred Henry	unopposed		
Country hold				

=== Cobar ===
1932 New South Wales state election: Cobar
Party	Candidate	Votes	%	±%
Labor (NSW)	Mat Davidson	6,729	60.2	−12.2
Country	Eric Killen	3,137	28.1	+28.1
Federal Labor	Samuel Bailey	1,306	11.7	+11.7
Total formal votes		11,172	98.3	+1.0
Informal votes		197	1.7	−1.0
Turnout		11,369	92.9	+2.0
Labor (NSW) hold		Swing	N/A	

- Preferences were not distributed.

=== Concord ===
1932 New South Wales state election: Concord
Party	Candidate	Votes	%	±%
United Australia	Stan Lloyd	9,773	56.1	+17.6
Labor (NSW)	Henry McDicken	7,528	43.2	−18.3
Communist	Robert Thomson	111	0.6	+0.6
Total formal votes		17,412	98.5	−0.5
Informal votes		259	1.5	+0.5
Turnout		17,671	97.3	+0.2
United Australia gain from Labor (NSW)		Swing	N/A	

- Preferences were not distributed.

=== Coogee ===
1932 New South Wales state election: Coogee
Party	Candidate	Votes	%	±%
United Australia	John Dunningham	13,070	67.2	+13.8
Labor (NSW)	Alphonsus Ticehurst	5,811	29.9	−15.7
Independent	Mark Cochrane	406	2.1	+2.1
Communist	Jessa Burns	175	0.9	+0.9
Total formal votes		19,462	98.0	+0.9
Informal votes		394	2.0	−0.9
Turnout		19,856	95.2	+1.1
United Australia hold		Swing	N/A	

=== Cootamundra ===
1932 New South Wales state election: Cootamundra
Party	Candidate	Votes	%	±%
Country	Bill Ross	6,312	50.3	+9.5
Labor (NSW)	Ken Hoad	5,471	43.6	−14.9
Federal Labor	Thomas Lavelle	765	6.1	+6.1
Total formal votes		12,548	99.1	+0.8
Informal votes		112	0.9	−0.8
Turnout		12,660	97.3	+0.4
Country gain from Labor (NSW)		Swing	N/A	

- Preferences were not distributed.

=== Corowa ===
1932 New South Wales state election: Corowa
Party	Candidate	Votes	%	±%
Country	Richard Ball	4,740	42.2	−19.1
Country	Sydney Creed	3,336	29.7	+29.7
Labor (NSW)	Patrick Quilty	3,143	28.0	−10.7
Total formal votes		11,219	98.7	−0.1
Informal votes		145	1.3	+0.1
Turnout		11,364	95.1	+2.0
Two-candidate-preferred result
Country	Richard Ball	5,610	50.0	
Country	Sydney Creed	5,609	50.0	
Member changed to Country from Nationalist				

- Richard Ball was elected at the 1930 election as a Nationalist candidate, but joined the Country party instead of the UAP.

=== Croydon ===
1932 New South Wales state election: Croydon
Party	Candidate	Votes	%	±%
United Australia	Bertram Stevens	11,962	70.4	+20.8
Labor (NSW)	John Eldridge	5,031	29.6	−10.1
Total formal votes		16,993	98.9	+0.8
Informal votes		195	1.1	−0.8
Turnout		17,188	95.3	+2.0
United Australia hold		Swing	+16.0	

=== Drummoyne ===
1932 New South Wales state election: Drummoyne
Party	Candidate	Votes	%	±%
United Australia	John Lee	7,786	43.6	−0.4
Labor (NSW)	David McLelland	6,324	35.4	−20.6
Ind. United Australia	William Udall	2,589	14.5	+14.5
Federal Labor	Algernon Lindsay	896	5.0	+5.0
Women's	Ruby Duncan	139	0.8	+0.8
Communist	Bernard Burns	115	0.6	+0.6
Two-party-preferred result
United Australia	John Lee	10,616	59.5	+15.5
Labor (NSW)	David McLelland	7,233	40.5	−15.5
United Australia gain from Labor (NSW)		Swing	+15.5	

=== Dubbo ===
1932 New South Wales state election: Dubbo
Party	Candidate	Votes	%	±%
Country	George Wilson	6,300	48.7	+2.9
Labor (NSW)	Alfred McClelland	4,675	36.2	−14.8
United Australia	John Macdonald	1,342	10.4	+10.4
Federal Labor	Harry O'Shea	608	4.7	+4.7
Total formal votes		12,925	98.6	+0.3
Informal votes		179	1.4	−0.3
Turnout		13,104	94.7	0.0
After distribution of preferences
Country	George Wilson	6,465	50.0	
Labor (NSW)	Alfred McClelland	4,875	37.7	
United Australia	John Macdonald	1,585	12.3	
Country gain from Labor (NSW)		Swing	N/A	

- Preferences were not distributed to completion.

=== Dulwich Hill ===
1932 New South Wales state election: Dulwich Hill
Party	Candidate	Votes	%	±%
United Australia	John Ness	8,679	45.1	−3.1
Labor (NSW)	Frank Connors	6,151	31.9	−19.5
Ind. United Australia	Francis Pascoe	2,679	13.9	+13.9
Federal Labor	William Long	1,746	9.1	+9.1
Total formal votes		19,255	98.9	+0.7
Informal votes		206	1.1	−0.7
Turnout		19,461	96.2	+2.2
Two-party-preferred result
United Australia	John Ness	11,840	61.5	+13.2
Labor (NSW)	Frank Connors	7,415	38.5	−13.2
United Australia gain from Labor (NSW)		Swing	+13.2	

=== Georges River ===
1932 New South Wales state election: Georges River
Party	Candidate	Votes	%	±%
United Australia	Cecil Monro	10,906	55.7	+18.3
Labor (NSW)	Ted Kinsella	7,546	38.6	−14.5
Federal Labor	John Keegan	902	4.6	+4.6
Communist	Patrick Drew	214	1.1	+0.3
Total formal votes		19,568	98.5	+0.3
Informal votes		294	1.5	−0.3
Turnout		19,862	97.0	+1.2
United Australia gain from Labor (NSW)		Swing	N/A	

- Preferences were not distributed.

=== Glebe ===
1932 New South Wales state election: Glebe
Party	Candidate	Votes	%	±%
Labor (NSW)	Tom Keegan	9,485	61.6	−17.0
United Australia	William Nicol	4,421	28.7	+8.4
Federal Labor	Northey Du Maurier	1,125	7.3	+7.3
Communist	Stanley Moran	362	2.4	+1.3
Total formal votes		15,393	98.1	+0.3
Informal votes		301	1.9	−0.3
Turnout		15,694	95.0	+1.4
Labor (NSW) hold		Swing	N/A	

- Preferences were not distributed.

=== Gloucester ===
1932 New South Wales state election: Gloucester
Party	Candidate	Votes	%	±%
United Australia	Walter Bennett	6,620	50.6	−20.1
Independent Country	William Hawdon	3,930	30.0	+30.0
Labor (NSW)	William Campbell	1,959	15.0	−14.3
Independent	William Flannery	569	4.4	+4.4
Total formal votes		13,078	98.3	−0.3
Informal votes		229	1.7	+0.3
Turnout		13,307	96.2	+1.8
United Australia hold		Swing	N/A	

- Preferences were not distributed.

=== Gordon ===
1932 New South Wales state election: Gordon
Party	Candidate	Votes	%	±%
United Australia	Thomas Bavin	16,112	87.4	+9.6
Labor (NSW)	George Smart	2,326	12.6	−8.8
Total formal votes		18,438	98.5	+0.3
Informal votes		280	1.5	−0.3
Turnout		18,718	96.0	+0.5
United Australia hold		Swing	N/A	

=== Goulburn ===
1932 New South Wales state election: Goulburn
Party	Candidate	Votes	%	±%
Labor (NSW)	Jack Tully	5,439	45.1	−15.4
United Australia	Peter Loughlin	4,300	35.6	−3.6
Country	John Garry	2,329	19.3	+19.3
Total formal votes		12,068	99.0	+0.4
Informal votes		119	1.0	−0.4
Turnout		12,187	97.3	+1.4
Two-party-preferred result
United Australia	Peter Loughlin	6,489	53.8	+14.6
Labor (NSW)	Jack Tully	5,579	46.2	−14.6
United Australia gain from Labor (NSW)		Swing	+14.6	

=== Granville ===
1932 New South Wales state election: Granville
Party	Candidate	Votes	%	±%
United Australia	Claude Fleck	8,694	47.4	+17.9
Labor (NSW)	Bill Ely	8,188	44.7	−25.8
Federal Labor	James Brophy	1,250	6.8	+6.8
Communist	Raymond Hall	180	1.0	+1.0
Independent	James Harwood	19	0.1	+0.1
Total formal votes		18,331	97.5	−1.2
Informal votes		477	2.5	+1.2
Turnout		18,808	97.2	+0.5
Two-party-preferred result
United Australia	Claude Fleck	9,592	52.3	+22.8
Labor (NSW)	Bill Ely	8,739	47.7	−22.8
United Australia gain from Labor (NSW)		Swing	+22.8	

=== Hamilton ===
1932 New South Wales state election: Hamilton
Party	Candidate	Votes	%	±%
Labor (NSW)	Hugh Connell	9,514	50.2	−19.6
Independent	Gordon Skelton	5,219	27.5	+27.5
All for Australia	Harold O'Neill	3,806	20.1	+20.1
Independent	Robert Anderson	241	1.3	+1.3
Communist	William Townsend	185	1.0	+1.0
Total formal votes		18,965	97.7	−0.3
Informal votes		451	2.3	+0.3
Turnout		19,416	97.1	+1.8
Labor (NSW) hold		Swing	N/A	

- Preferences were not distributed.

=== Hartley ===
1932 New South Wales state election: Hartley
Party	Candidate	Votes	%	±%
Labor (NSW)	Hamilton Knight	7,080	62.2	−18.8
United Australia	Horace Bracey	2,440	21.4	+5.7
Independent Labor	James Dooley	1,585	13.9	+13.9
Communist	Patrick Walsh	275	2.4	−0.9
Total formal votes		11,380	98.7	+0.3
Informal votes		144	1.3	−0.3
Turnout		11,524	97.4	+2.1
Labor (NSW) hold		Swing	N/A	

- Preferences were not distributed.
- Horace Bracey was jointly endorsed by the UAP and Country party.

=== Hawkesbury ===
1932 New South Wales state election: Hawkesbury
Party	Candidate	Votes	%	±%
United Australia	Bruce Walker Jr	6,754	51.8	−13.2
Labor (NSW)	Henry Taverner	2,495	19.1	−15.9
Independent Country	Robert Wood	2,394	18.4	+18.4
Independent Country	Albert Taylor	1,398	10.7	+10.7
Total formal votes		13,041	98.9	+0.4
Informal votes		151	1.1	−0.4
Turnout		13,192	96.7	+0.2
United Australia hold		Swing	N/A	

- Preferences were not distributed.

=== Hornsby ===
1932 New South Wales state election: Hornsby
Party	Candidate	Votes	%	±%
United Australia	James Shand	14,462	75.9	+13.8
Labor (NSW)	Charles Hankin	4,599	24.1	−12.5
Total formal votes		19,061	98.4	+0.8
Informal votes		318	1.6	−0.8
Turnout		19,379	95.5	+0.2
United Australia hold		Swing	N/A	

=== Hurstville ===
1932 New South Wales state election: Hurstville
Party	Candidate	Votes	%	±%
United Australia	James Webb	9,744	51.6	+15.6
Labor (NSW)	Walter Butler	8,093	42.9	−20.3
Federal Labor	Gertrude Melville	873	4.6	+4.6
Communist	James Stubbs	154	0.8	+0.1
Total formal votes		18,864	98.7	+0.5
Informal votes		247	1.3	−0.5
Turnout		19,111	97.9	+1.6
United Australia gain from Labor (NSW)		Swing	N/A	

- Preferences were not distributed.

=== Illawarra ===
1932 New South Wales state election: Illawarra
Party	Candidate	Votes	%	±%
United Australia	Patrick Canwell	7,133	48.2	+15.8
Labor (NSW)	Billy Davies	7,057	47.7	−18.2
Communist	William Blake	353	2.4	+0.7
Federal Labor	Mont Sheppard	201	1.4	+1.4
Independent	John Scarlett	61	0.4	+0.4
Total formal votes		14,805	98.2	−0.2
Informal votes		264	1.8	+0.2
Turnout		15,069	97.4	+1.2
Two-party-preferred result
Labor (NSW)	Billy Davies	7,426	50.2	
United Australia	Patrick Canwell	7,379	49.8	
Labor (NSW) hold		Swing	N/A	

=== King ===
1932 New South Wales state election: King
Party	Candidate	Votes	%	±%
Labor (NSW)	Daniel Clyne	8,578	51.0	−16.2
United Australia	Henry Manning	7,356	43.7	+12.7
Federal Labor	Edgar Grover	547	3.3	+3.3
Communist	Ted Tripp	354	2.1	+0.3
Total formal votes		16,835	97.7	+0.9
Informal votes		404	2.3	−0.9
Turnout		17,239	92.6	+5.4
Labor (NSW) hold		Swing	N/A	

- Preferences were not distributed.

=== Kogarah ===
1932 New South Wales state election: Kogarah
Party	Candidate	Votes	%	±%
United Australia	James Ross	9,664	49.6	+15.4
Labor (NSW)	Mark Gosling	8,166	42.0	−23.1
Federal Labor	Robert Beaton	1,444	7.4	+7.4
Communist	Arthur Smith	165	0.9	+0.1
Independent	Philip Coyle	27	0.1	+0.1
Total formal votes		19,466	98.2	−0.3
Informal votes		356	1.8	+0.3
Turnout		19,822	98.1	+1.6
Two-party-preferred result
United Australia	James Ross	10,579	54.3	
Labor (NSW)	Mark Gosling	8,887	45.7	
United Australia gain from Labor (NSW)		Swing	N/A	

=== Kurri Kurri ===
1932 New South Wales state election: Kurri Kurri
Party	Candidate	Votes	%	±%
Labor (NSW)	George Booth	14,064	88.5	−6.7
Communist	Harris Burnham	1,820	11.5	+6.7
Total formal votes		15,884	82.6	−9.3
Informal votes		3,338	17.4	+9.3
Turnout		19,222	96.6	+0.8
Labor (NSW) hold		Swing	−6.7	

=== Lachlan ===
1932 New South Wales state election: Lachlan
Party	Candidate	Votes	%	±%
Country	Ernest Buttenshaw	8,508	64.8	+8.1
Labor (NSW)	John Heiss	3,173	24.2	−17.5
Federal Labor	David Nilon	1,117	8.5	+8.5
Independent Country	Philip Bolte	337	2.6	+2.6
Total formal votes		13,135	98.2	+0.2
Informal votes		243	1.8	−0.2
Turnout		13,378	96.1	+1.2
Country hold		Swing	N/A	

- Preferences were not distributed.

=== Lakemba ===
1932 New South Wales state election: Lakemba
Party	Candidate	Votes	%	±%
Labor (NSW)	Fred Stanley	8,667	49.2	−19.6
United Australia	Robert Uebel	7,374	41.8	+15.6
Federal Labor	John McCallum	1,431	8.1	+8.1
Communist	John Terry	151	0.9	+0.1
Total formal votes		17,623	98.3	+1.2
Informal votes		306	1.7	−1.2
Turnout		17,929	96.5	−2.3
Two-party-preferred result
Labor (NSW)	Fred Stanley	9,401	53.4	
United Australia	Robert Uebel	8,222	46.6	
Labor (NSW) hold		Swing		

=== Lane Cove ===
1932 New South Wales state election: Lane Cove
Party	Candidate	Votes	%	±%
United Australia	Herbert FitzSimons	14,402	78.7	+20.1
Labor (NSW)	Jack Fitzpatrick	3,894	21.3	−7.9
Total formal votes		18,296	98.6	0.0
Informal votes		251	1.4	0.0
Turnout		18,547	96.3	+1.1
Labor (NSW) hold		Swing		

=== Leichhardt ===
1932 New South Wales state election: Leichhardt
Party	Candidate	Votes	%	±%
Labor (NSW)	Barney Olde	8,976	54.5	−20.4
United Australia	Andrew Campbell	6,184	37.5	+15.5
Federal Labor	Robert Storey	1,248	7.6	+7.6
Independent	Charles Shields	75	0.5	−0.9
Total formal votes		16,483	98.3	+1.6
Informal votes		284	1.7	−1.6
Turnout		16,767	97.9	+1.6
Labor (NSW) hold		Swing	N/A	

- Preferences were not distributed.

=== Lismore ===
1932 New South Wales state election: Lismore
Party	Candidate	Votes	%	±%
Country	William Missingham	9,823	76.0	+12.6
Labor (NSW)	Charles Taylor	3,093	24.0	−12.2
Total formal votes		12,916	99.0	+1.1
Informal votes		127	1.0	−1.1
Turnout		13,043	96.8	+1.6
Country hold		Swing	N/A	

=== Liverpool Plains ===
1932 New South Wales state election: Liverpool Plains
Party	Candidate	Votes	%	±%
Country	Harry Carter	7,932	66.3	+15.4
Labor (NSW)	Elijah Smith	4,030	33.7	−15.4
Total formal votes		11,962	98.4	+0.3
Informal votes		193	1.6	−0.3
Turnout		12,155	96.4	+0.5
Country hold		Swing	+15.4	

=== Maitland ===
1932 New South Wales state election: Maitland
Party	Candidate	Votes	%	±%
Labor (NSW)	Walter O'Hearn	4,872	39.7	−14.2
United Australia	Walter Howarth	4,806	39.2	−6.5
Country	Alexander McDonald	2,498	20.4	+20.4
Communist	James Heatherill	92	0.7	+0.2
Total formal votes		12,268	98.6	+0.1
Informal votes		174	1.4	−0.1
Turnout		12,442	97.9	−0.2
Two-party-preferred result
United Australia	Walter Howarth	7,175	58.5	+12.7
Labor (NSW)	Walter O'Hearn	5,093	41.5	−12.7
United Australia gain from Labor (NSW)		Swing	+12.7	

=== Manly ===
1932 New South Wales state election: Manly
Party	Candidate	Votes	%	±%
United Australia	Alfred Reid	14,316	76.5	+25.0
Independent	Clarence Pullen	4,391	23.5	+23.5
Total formal votes		18,707	97.4	−0.7
Informal votes		497	2.6	+0.7
Turnout		19,204	96.6	+1.4
United Australia hold		Swing	N/A	

=== Marrickville ===
1932 New South Wales state election: Marrickville
Party	Candidate	Votes	%	±%
Labor (NSW)	Carlo Lazzarini	8,422	47.4	−18.5
United Australia	Herbert Donald	7,300	41.0	+13.1
Federal Labor	Thomas Melody	984	5.5	+5.5
Ind. United Australia	Frank Wright	941	5.3	+5.3
Communist	John Loughran	136	0.8	+0.3
Total formal votes		17,783	97.8	−0.3
Informal votes		408	2.2	+0.3
Turnout		18,191	97.2	+3.4
Two-party-preferred result
Labor (NSW)	Carlo Lazzarini	9,125	51.3	
United Australia	Herbert Donald	8,658	48.7	
Labor (NSW) hold		Swing	N/A	

=== Monaro ===
1932 New South Wales state election: Monaro
Party	Candidate	Votes	%	±%
Country	William Hedges	7,119	57.5	+7.0
Labor (NSW)	James Bollard	4,005	32.3	−17.2
Federal Labor	John Cusack	782	6.3	+6.3
Independent	Douglas Norris	482	3.9	+3.9
Total formal votes		12,388	97.2	−1.6
Informal votes		355	2.8	+1.6
Turnout		12,743	97.8	+0.4
Country hold		Swing	N/A	

- Preferences were not distributed.

=== Mosman ===
1932 New South Wales state election: Mosman
Party	Candidate	Votes	%	±%
United Australia	Herbert Lloyd	14,487	86.6	+22.7
Labor (NSW)	William Thomason	2,236	13.4	−7.5
Total formal votes		16,723	98.6	+0.1
Informal votes		241	1.4	−0.1
Turnout		16,964	96.4	+1.7
United Australia hold		Swing	N/A	

=== Mudgee ===
1932 New South Wales state election: Mudgee
Party	Candidate	Votes	%	±%
Country	David Spring	6,956	52.5	+14.1
Labor (NSW)	Bill Dunn	6,248	47.2	−13.8
Communist	James Terry	43	0.3	−0.3
Total formal votes		13,247	99.1	0.0
Informal votes		114	0.9	0.0
Turnout		13,361	96.9	+0.9
Country gain from Labor (NSW)		Swing	N/A	

- David Spring was jointly endorsed by the UAP and Country Party. In parliament, he caucused with the Country party.

=== Murray ===
1932 New South Wales state election: Murray
Party	Candidate	Votes	%	±%
Country	Joe Lawson	5,269	46.4	+14.4
Labor (NSW)	John Donovan	4,602	40.6	−8.3
United Australia	John Dowling	1,473	13.0	+13.0
Total formal votes		11,344	97.9	+1.4
Informal votes		237	2.1	−1.4
Turnout		11,581	93.7	+1.1
Two-party-preferred result
Country	Joe Lawson	6,491	57.2	+7.8
Labor (NSW)	John Donovan	4,853	42.8	−7.8
Country gain from Labor (NSW)		Swing	+7.8	

=== Murrumbidgee ===
1932 New South Wales state election: Murrumbidgee
Party	Candidate	Votes	%	±%
Labor (NSW)	Martin Flannery	5,608	41.7	−15.0
Country	Robert Hankinson	5,556	41.3	−0.7
Country	Michael Gleeson	2,044	15.2	+15.2
Federal Labor	Ernest Parkin	235	1.8	+1.8
Total formal votes		13,443	98.1	+0.1
Informal votes		264	1.9	−0.1
Turnout		13,707	97.1	+2.0
Two-party-preferred result
Country	Robert Hankinson	7,565	56.3	
Labor (NSW)	Martin Flannery	5,878	43.7	
Country gain from Labor (NSW)		Swing	N/A	

=== Namoi ===
1932 New South Wales state election: Namoi
Party	Candidate	Votes	%	±%
Country	Colin Sinclair	7,264	56.3	+13.6
Labor (NSW)	William Scully	5,484	42.5	−14.8
Independent	Ernest Bachelor	151	1.2	+1.2
Total formal votes		12,899	99.0	+0.2
Informal votes		130	1.0	−0.2
Turnout		13,029	96.3	+0.9
Country gain from Labor (NSW)		Swing	N/A	

=== Nepean ===
1932 New South Wales state election: Nepean
Party	Candidate	Votes	%	±%
United Australia	Joseph Jackson	10,779	85.9	+28.2
Communist	Thomas Moon	1,764	14.1	+14.1
Total formal votes		12,543	91.3	−7.6
Informal votes		1,188	8.7	+7.6
Turnout		13,731	95.3	−0.2
United Australia hold		Swing	N/A	

=== Neutral Bay ===
1932 New South Wales state election: Neutral Bay
Party	Candidate	Votes	%	±%
United Australia	Reginald Weaver	12,845	80.7	+15.3
Labor (NSW)	William McMullen	3,072	19.3	−8.4
Total formal votes		15,917	98.3	−0.5
Informal votes		276	1.7	+0.5
Turnout		16,193	96.6	+3.4
United Australia hold		Swing	N/A	

=== Newcastle ===
1932 New South Wales state election: Newcastle
Party	Candidate	Votes	%	±%
Labor (NSW)	Peter Connolly	9,470	52.9	−17.0
United Australia	Charles Parker	6,904	38.6	+13.8
Federal Labor	Hugh Sutherland	1,068	6.0	+6.0
Communist	Catherine Barratt	350	2.0	+1.0
Independent	Elizabeth Robinson	76	0.4	+0.4
Independent	Clarence Martin	24	0.1	+0.1
Total formal votes		17,892	97.4	−0.3
Informal votes		477	2.6	+0.3
Turnout		18,369	97.0	+1.8
Labor (NSW) hold		Swing	N/A	

- Preferences were not distributed.

=== Newtown ===
1932 New South Wales state election: Newtown
Party	Candidate	Votes	%	±%
Labor (NSW)	Frank Burke	10,885	67.2	−16.2
United Australia	Robert Williams	4,605	28.4	+13.7
Federal Labor	Albert Clifton	409	2.5	+2.5
Communist	Jack Kavanagh	224	1.4	0.0
Independent	Henry Dawson	72	0.4	+0.4
Total formal votes		16,195	97.1	−0.6
Informal votes		483	2.9	+0.6
Turnout		16,678	96.6	+1.4
Labor (NSW) hold		Swing	N/A	

- Preferences were not distributed.

=== North Sydney ===
1932 New South Wales state election: North Sydney
Party	Candidate	Votes	%	±%
United Australia	Hubert Primrose	9,943	58.6	+12.7
Labor (NSW)	Ben Howe	6,052	35.7	−16.4
Federal Labor	Cecil Murphy	544	3.2	+3.2
Independent	Lucy Gullett	332	2.0	+2.0
Independent	Edward Clark	89	0.5	+0.5
Total formal votes		16,960	97.9	+1.1
Informal votes		367	2.1	−1.1
Turnout		17,327	96.3	+2.3
United Australia gain from Labor (NSW)		Swing	N/A	

- Preferences were not distributed.

=== Orange ===
1932 New South Wales state election: Orange
Party	Candidate	Votes	%	±%
Labor (NSW)	William Folster	5,344	39.4	−13.3
United Australia	Alwyn Tonking	4,293	31.6	−15.7
Country	Fred Hinton	3,925	28.9	+28.9
Total formal votes		13,562	98.9	−0.1
Informal votes		147	1.1	+0.1
Turnout		13,709	96.9	+0.2
Two-party-preferred result
United Australia	Alwyn Tonking	7,924	58.4	+11.1
Labor (NSW)	William Folster	5,638	41.6	−11.1
United Australia gain from Labor (NSW)		Swing	+11.1	

=== Oxley ===
1932 New South Wales state election: Oxley
Party	Candidate	Votes	%	±%
United Australia	Lewis Martin	10,273	77.2	+12.8
Labor (NSW)	Joseph Cooper	3,036	22.8	−9.7
Total formal votes		13,309	98.0	+0.1
Informal votes		268	2.0	−0.1
Turnout		13,577	96.6	−0.2
United Australia hold		Swing	N/A	

=== Paddington ===
1932 New South Wales state election: Paddington
Party	Candidate	Votes	%	±%
Labor (NSW)	Maurice O'Sullivan	9,061	58.0	−19.6
United Australia	Frank Graham	5,130	32.9	+12.6
Federal Labor	George Laughlan	614	3.9	+3.9
Ind. United Australia	Alfred Webb	501	3.2	+3.2
Communist	George Fleming	305	2.0	+0.3
Total formal votes		15,611	96.5	−1.0
Informal votes		567	3.5	+1.0
Turnout		16,178	96.5	+5.4
Labor (NSW) hold		Swing	N/A	

- Preferences were not distributed.

=== Parramatta ===
1932 New South Wales state election: Parramatta
Party	Candidate	Votes	%	±%
United Australia	George Gollan	10,696	55.0	+11.8
Labor (NSW)	Joseph Byrne	7,232	37.2	−19.0
Federal Labor	Albert Rowe	1,112	5.7	+5.7
Independent	George Mobbs	214	1.1	+1.1
Communist	Frederick Bateman	196	1.0	+0.4
Total formal votes		19,450	96.5	−1.5
Informal votes		707	3.5	+1.5
Turnout		20,157	97.7	+2.1
United Australia gain from Labor (NSW)		Swing	N/A	

- Preferences were not distributed.

=== Petersham ===
1932 New South Wales state election: Petersham
Party	Candidate	Votes	%	±%
United Australia	Eric Solomon	8,499	49.4	+11.7
Labor (NSW)	Joe Lamaro	7,453	43.3	−18.1
Federal Labor	Patrick Colbourne	1,221	7.1	+7.1
Independent	Edgar Vale	30	0.2	+0.2
Total formal votes		17,203	98.6	+0.6
Informal votes		250	1.4	−0.6
Turnout		17,453	96.1	+2.6
Two-party-preferred result
United Australia	Eric Solomon	9,213	53.5	
Labor (NSW)	Joe Lamaro	7,990	46.5	
United Australia gain from Labor (NSW)		Swing	N/A	

=== Phillip ===
1932 New South Wales state election: Phillip
Party	Candidate	Votes	%	±%
Labor (NSW)	Tom Shannon	10,708	70.5	−12.7
United Australia	William Adkins	3,347	22.0	+7.2
Federal Labor	Ronald Wyllie	786	5.2	+5.2
Communist	Edward Docker	354	2.3	+0.3
Total formal votes		15,195	96.3	−1.1
Informal votes		585	3.7	+1.1
Turnout		15,780	93.3	+2.2
Labor (NSW) hold		Swing	N/A	

- Preferences were not distributed.

=== Raleigh ===
1932 New South Wales state election: Raleigh
Party	Candidate	Votes	%	±%
Country	Roy Vincent	10,537	77.1	+21.1
Labor (NSW)	David Walker	3,133	22.9	−8.0
Total formal votes		13,670	98.3	+0.6
Informal votes		239	1.7	−0.6
Turnout		13,909	96.3	+0.2
Country hold		Swing	N/A	

=== Randwick ===
1932 New South Wales state election: Randwick
Party	Candidate	Votes	%	±%
United Australia	Arthur Moverly	9,622	52.4	+16.9
Labor (NSW)	Jack Flanagan	7,696	41.9	−16.0
Federal Labor	Francis Pollard	1,042	5.7	+5.7
Total formal votes		18,360	99.0	+0.4
Informal votes		183	1.0	−0.4
Turnout		18,543	96.0	+4.4
United Australia gain from Labor (NSW)		Swing	N/A	

- Preferences were not distributed.

=== Redfern ===
1932 New South Wales state election: Redfern
Party	Candidate	Votes	%	±%
Labor (NSW)	William McKell	12,190	73.4	−13.7
United Australia	John Wright	3,557	21.4	+9.8
Federal Labor	Harold Sutton	696	4.2	+4.2
Communist	Jean Thomson-Marsh	170	1.0	−0.3
Total formal votes		16,613	98.1	+0.2
Informal votes		326	1.9	−0.2
Turnout		16,939	96.2	+1.7
Labor (NSW) hold		Swing	N/A	

- Preferences were not distributed.

=== Ryde ===
1932 New South Wales state election: Ryde
Party	Candidate	Votes	%	±%
United Australia	Eric Spooner	11,072	57.0	+22.0
Labor (NSW)	Evan Davies	7,236	37.2	−12.8
Federal Labor	May Matthews	905	4.7	+4.7
Communist	Richard Barron	218	1.1	+0.6
Total formal votes		19,431	98.5	+1.2
Informal votes		296	1.5	−1.2
Turnout		19,727	97.4	+1.2
United Australia gain from Labor (NSW)		Swing	N/A	

- Preferences were not distributed.

=== South Coast ===
1932 New South Wales state election: South Coast
Party	Candidate	Votes	%	±%
United Australia	Henry Bate	9,947	74.9	+16.3
Labor (NSW)	John Dooley	3,338	25.1	−9.0
Total formal votes		13,285	98.6	+1.5
Informal votes		186	1.4	−1.5
Turnout		13,471	96.5	+0.4
United Australia hold		Swing	N/A	

=== Sturt ===
1932 New South Wales state election: Sturt
Party	Candidate	Votes	%	±%
Labor (NSW)	Ted Horsington	8,945	93.2	0.0
Communist	Frederick Miller	656	6.8	0.0
Total formal votes		9,601	83.4	−4.4
Informal votes		1,907	16.6	+4.4
Turnout		11,508	94.6	+0.2
Labor (NSW) hold		Swing	0.0	

=== Tamworth ===
1932 New South Wales state election: Tamworth
Party	Candidate	Votes	%	±%
United Australia	Frank Chaffey	7,585	60.9	+6.0
Labor (NSW)	Thomas Normoyle	3,145	25.2	−18.1
Independent Country	James Brownhill	1,637	13.1	+13.1
Independent	James Neale	97	0.8	+0.8
Total formal votes		12,464	98.4	+0.5
Informal votes		198	1.6	−0.5
Turnout		12,662	96.9	+0.5
United Australia hold		Swing	N/A	

- Preferences were not distributed.

=== Temora ===
1932 New South Wales state election: Temora
Party	Candidate	Votes	%	±%
Country	Hugh Main	7,202	61.2	+10.6
Labor (NSW)	Essell Hoad	4,238	36.0	−10.6
Independent Labor	James King	330	2.8	0.0
Total formal votes		11,770	98.5	+0.4
Informal votes		174	1.5	−0.4
Turnout		11,944	97.0	+1.0
Country hold		Swing	N/A	

- Preferences were not distributed.

=== Tenterfield ===
1932 New South Wales state election: Tenterfield
Party	Candidate	Votes	%	±%
Country	Michael Bruxner	unopposed		
Country hold				

=== Upper Hunter ===
1932 New South Wales state election: Upper Hunter
Party	Candidate	Votes	%	±%
Country	Malcolm Brown	7,380	56.4	+56.4
Labor (NSW)	Joseph Shakespeare	3,467	26.5	−16.5
Independent	Arie Dorsman	2,232	17.1	+17.1
Total formal votes		13,079	98.7	+1.9
Informal votes		176	1.3	−1.9
Turnout		13,255	96.3	−1.8
Country gain from United Australia		Swing	N/A	

William Cameron (Nationalist) died and Malcolm Brown (Independent Country) won the resulting by-election, standing as a Country candidate at this election.

=== Vaucluse ===
1932 New South Wales state election: Vaucluse
Party	Candidate	Votes	%	±%
United Australia	William Foster	unopposed		
United Australia hold				

=== Wagga Wagga ===
1932 New South Wales state election: Wagga Wagga
Party	Candidate	Votes	%	±%
Country	Matthew Kilpatrick	7,909	67.6	+11.2
Labor (NSW)	Kenneth Campbell	3,783	32.4	−11.2
Total formal votes		11,692	97.9	−1.0
Informal votes		251	2.1	+1.0
Turnout		11,943	97.7	+2.6
Country hold		Swing	+11.2	

=== Waratah ===
1932 New South Wales state election: Waratah
Party	Candidate	Votes	%	±%
Labor (NSW)	Robert Cameron	8,975	48.9	−28.2
United Australia	Arthur Griffiths	7,183	39.1	+17.2
Federal Labor	Arthur Griffith	1,892	10.3	+10.3
Communist	Sidney Bethune	313	1.7	+0.7
Total formal votes		18,363	97.9	−0.1
Informal votes		394	2.1	+0.1
Turnout		18,757	97.8	+2.3
After distribution of preferences
Labor (NSW)	Robert Cameron	9,234	50.3	
United Australia	Arthur Griffiths	7,208	39.2	
Federal Labor	Arthur Griffith	1,921	10.5	
Labor (NSW) hold		Swing	N/A	

- Preferences were not distributed to completion.
- Arthur Griffiths was jointly endorsed by the UAP and Country Party.

=== Waverley ===
1932 New South Wales state election: Waverley
Party	Candidate	Votes	%	±%
United Australia	John Waddell	9,644	52.3	+15.0
Labor (NSW)	William Clementson	7,789	42.2	−15.3
Federal Labor	Albert Gardiner	904	4.9	+4.9
Communist	Esmonde Higgins	102	0.6	+0.6
Total formal votes		18,439	98.7	+1.9
Informal votes		249	1.3	−1.9
Turnout		18,688	95.8	+2.5
United Australia gain from Labor (NSW)		Swing	N/A	

- Preferences were not distributed.

=== Willoughby ===
1932 New South Wales state election: Willoughby
Party	Candidate	Votes	%	±%
United Australia	Edward Sanders	12,269	71.3	+29.9
Labor (NSW)	Richard Lynch	4,944	28.7	−10.9
Total formal votes		17,213	99.0	+0.1
Informal votes		170	1.0	−0.1
Turnout		17,383	97.1	+1.3
United Australia hold		Swing	+16.4	

=== Wollondilly ===
1932 New South Wales state election: Wollondilly
Party	Candidate	Votes	%	±%
United Australia	Mark Morton	8,971	70.6	+14.3
Labor (NSW)	John Cleary	3,232	25.4	−18.3
Federal Labor	Patrick Kenna	500	3.9	+3.9
Total formal votes		12,703	98.8	+0.3
Informal votes		157	1.2	−0.3
Turnout		12,860	96.1	+0.2
United Australia hold		Swing	N/A	

- Preferences were not distributed.

=== Woollahra ===
1932 New South Wales state election: Woollahra
Party	Candidate	Votes	%	±%
United Australia	Daniel Levy	13,182	75.5	+16.4
Labor (NSW)	Robert Stapleton	4,279	24.5	−6.7
Total formal votes		17,461	98.3	+0.6
Informal votes		296	1.7	−0.6
Turnout		17,757	93.0	+5.9
United Australia hold		Swing	N/A	

=== Yass ===
1932 New South Wales state election: Yass
Party	Candidate	Votes	%	±%
United Australia	George Ardill	7,364	61.9	+33.5
Labor (NSW)	Reginald O'Brien	4,524	38.1	−8.2
Total formal votes		11,888	98.4	+0.2
Informal votes		197	1.6	−0.2
Turnout		12,085	97.3	+1.1
United Australia hold		Swing	+11.3	

=== Young ===
1932 New South Wales state election: Young
Party	Candidate	Votes	%	±%
Country	Albert Reid	6,391	48.7	+9.7
Labor (NSW)	Clarrie Martin	5,258	40.1	−6.5
Country	Mark Whitby	1,467	11.2	+11.2
Total formal votes		13,116	98.5	−0.2
Informal votes		193	1.5	+0.2
Turnout		13,309	96.8	+1.2
Two-party-preferred result
Country	Albert Reid	7,762	59.2	+12.4
Labor (NSW)	Clarrie Martin	5,354	40.8	−12.4
Country gain from Labor (NSW)		Swing	+12.4	

== See also ==
- Candidates of the 1932 New South Wales state election
- Members of the New South Wales Legislative Assembly, 1932–1935
