= Candidates of the 1925 New South Wales state election =

This is a list of candidates for the 1925 New South Wales state election. The election was held on 30 May 1925. The election was the last of three conducted under the system of proportional representation.

== Retiring Members ==
=== Nationalist ===
- Arthur Cocks (North Shore)
- Arthur Grimm (Murrumbidgee)
- Thomas Ley (St George) — retired to contest Barton at the 1925 federal election
- Edward Loxton (Ryde)
- George Nesbitt (Byron)
- Charles Oakes (Eastern Suburbs)
- Reginald Weaver (North Shore)
- James Wilson (Western Suburbs)

=== Progressive ===
- Thomas Rutledge (Goulburn)

=== Others ===
- John Bailey (Independent, Goulburn) — had been expelled from the Labor Party

== Legislative Assembly ==
Sitting members are shown in bold text. Successful parties are highlighted in the relevant colour. Successful candidates are indicated by an asterisk (*).

Electorate	Sitting MPs	Labor candidates	Nationalist candidates	Progressive candidates	Other candidates
Balmain	3 Labor; 2 Nationalist	Kate Dwyer; H. V. Evatt*; **Tom Keegan***; **John Quirk***; **Robert Stuart-Robertson***	Stanley Cole; Gideon Gillespie; Thomas Greentree; **Albert Lane***; **Robert Stopford**		James Johnston (PLP); Lionel Leece (CPA); Charles Mallett (Ind); Thomas Payne (CPA)
Bathurst	1 Labor; 2 Nationalist	**James Dooley***; Gus Kelly*; Hamilton Knight	James Beddie; **John Fitzpatrick***; **Charles Rosenthal**		
Botany	4 Labor; 1 Nationalist	**Frank Burke***; William Long; **William McKell***; **Thomas Mutch***; **Bill Ratcliffe***	David Alexander; William Herford; **John Lee***; James Sinclair; Stephen Turner		Walter Bateman (PLP); Henry Denford (CPA); Peter Gallagher (Ind Lab); Carl Liebau (MLP); Nellie Rickie (CPA); Arthur Strange-Mure (Ind)
Byron	2 Nationalist; 1 Progressive	Robert Gillies*; Ernest Hollis-Neath; Tom Swiney	Stanley Fayle; Charles Munro; **Stephen Perdriau**	Thomas Foyster; **William Missingham***; Frederick Stuart*; John Williams	
Cootamundra	2 Labor; 1 Progressive	Joseph Carney; Ken Hoad*; **Peter Loughlin***	Angus Campbell; William Pinkstone; Ernest Todhunter	Ernest Field; **Hugh Main***; Eric Treatt; Benjamin Witenden	George Davey (PLP)
Cumberland	1 Labor; 2 Nationalist	Walter Anderson; Robert Bingham; Florence Ewers; **James McGirr***	**William FitzSimons***; James Shand; **Bruce Walker Sr***	Reginald Harris; Aaron Morris; Arthur Upchurch	John Allaburton (Ind); Ernest Carr (Ind)
Eastern Suburbs	1 Labor; 3 Nationalist; 1 Democratic	Septimus Alldis*; Gordon Anderson; William Crick; Gertrude Melville; **Bob O'Halloran***	William Foster*; **Hyman Goldstein**; **Harold Jaques***; George Overhill; Millicent Preston-Stanley*; Joseph Robinson		David Anderson (Ind); **Cyril Fallon** (Ind); James Gillespie (PLP); Frederick Marks (Ind)
Goulburn	1 Labor; 1 Nationalist; 1 Progressive	Clarence Steele; Paddy Stokes*; Jack Tully*	Henry Bate; Percy Hollis; **John Perkins***	William Bluett; William Hedges; Adam Singer	Denis O'Leary (YAP)
Maitland	1 Labor; 2 Nationalist	John Hynes; William McClelland; **Walter O'Hearn***	**Walter Bennett***; **William Cameron***; Charles Nicholson		George Batey (PLP)
Murray	1 Labor; 1 Nationalist; 1 Progressive	George Bodkin; Vern Goodin*; **William O'Brien**	**Richard Ball***; Joseph Niesigh	Charles Coghlan; **Matthew Kilpatrick***; Olave Olsen	
Murrumbigdee	1 Labor; 1 Nationalist; 1 Progressive	**Martin Flannery***; James Lyons; William Nulty	Edmund Best*; Duncan Cameron; Reginald Westmore	**Ernest Buttenshaw***; Alexander McArthur	Mary McCracken (Ind)
Namoi	1 Labor; 2 Nationalist	Michael Hagan; James Hawkins; **William Scully***	**Frank Chaffey***; **Walter Wearne***	Aubrey Abbott; James Laird; Lachlan McLachlan	Robert Levien (Ind)
Newcastle	3 Labor; 1 Nationalist; 1 Independent	**Jack Baddeley***; George Booth*; **Hugh Connell***; David Davies; **David Murray***	**Magnus Cromarty**; Oliver Denny; John Fegan; David Murray; Charles Watt		Arthur Gardiner (Ind); James Hestelow (PLP); Robert Mitchell (Ind); James Pendlebury (PLP); **Walter Skelton*** (PLP)
North Shore	1 Labor; 3 Nationalist; 1 Independent	Bertrand Childs; Oliver Kelly; **Cecil Murphy***; Samuel Sloane; Arthur Tonge	**Richard Arthur***; Ernest Marks; **Alfred Reid***; Ernest Salmon; William Wood		**William Fell*** (Ind Nat); Alick Kay* (Ind); Harry Meatheringham (Ind); Alfred Waterhouse (Ind); Mary Williams (Ind)
Northern Tableland	1 Labor; 2 Progressive	William McArdle; **Alfred McClelland***; Dennis Shanahan		**Michael Bruxner***; **David Drummond***; Daniel Lewis	
Oxley	1 Labor; 1 Nationalist; 1 Progressive	**Joseph Fitzgerald***; James Goudie; William Terry	John Cameron; **Theodore Hill***; William Robinson	Ray Fitzgerald; William Flannery; Henry Morton; **Roy Vincent***	
Parramatta	1 Labor; 2 Nationalist	Bill Ely*; **Jack Lang***; Edwin Wrench	**Albert Bruntnell***; George Folkard; **Thomas Morrow**		William Chalson (PLP); Albert Jones (Ind); Cecil Robinson (MLP); Francis Silverstone (Ind)
Ryde	1 Labor; 4 Nationalist	James Concannon; **Robert Greig***; Edward Lamont; William McCristal; Stan Taylor	**David Anderson***; **Thomas Bavin***; **Sir Thomas Henley***; Edward Sanders*; Herbert Small	Lindsay Thompson; Crawford Vaughan	Cecil Brierley (Ind Nat); James Chamberlain (PLP); William Featherstone (PLP); John Pattison (Ind)
St George	2 Labor; 3 Nationalist	George Burns; Joseph Cahill*; **George Cann***; **Mark Gosling***; Ernest Sheiles	**Guy Arkins***; **William Bagnall**; Thomas Casserly; Francis Farrar; **Thomas Ley***; Cecil Monro; Reginald Reid		Walter Anderson (PLP); John Cooper (Ind); Alfred Dicker (Ind); James Dunlop (PLP); William Goulden (PLP); Roy Hindwood (PLP); Arthur Jones (PLP); Ernest Lambourne (Ind)
Sturt	2 Labor; 1 Nationalist	**Mat Davidson***; Thomas Griffiths; **Ted Horsington***	**Brian Doe***; Francis Harvey; William Shoobridge		Charles Dooley (Ind)
Sydney	3 Labor; 2 Nationalist	**John Birt***; Michael Burke*; William Holdsworth*; Francis McGuinness; **Patrick Minahan**	Albert Higgs; **Joseph Jackson***; Reuben Kefford; **Daniel Levy***; Gordon Stead		Robert Bates (Ind); Alphonsus Canon (YAP); Pat Drew (CPA); Charles Foster (Ind); Jock Garden (CPA); James Jones (Ind); **Greg McGirr** (YAP); Leslie Milgate (YAP); Edwin Miller (Ind); Charles Mortimer (YAP); Laurence Raw (PLP)
Wammerawa	1 Labor; 1 Progressive; 1 Independent	**Joseph Clark***; **Bill Dunn***; John Ritchie	Harold Blackett; Henry Buttsworth; John Macdonald	Samuel Armstrong; **Harold Thorby***; Alfred Yeo	
Western Suburbs	2 Labor; 3 Nationalist	**Carlo Lazzarini***; **Edward McTiernan***; Barney Olde; Roger Ryan; James Troy	**Tom Hoskins***; Milton Jarvie*; Henry Morton; **John Ness***; William Simpson		Frederick Armstrong (PLP); John Cain (MLP); Alexander Huie (Ind); Alfred Millington (PLP)
Wollondilly	1 Labor; 2 Nationalist	**Billy Davies***; Andrew Lysaght*; Patrick Malloy	**Sir George Fuller***; **Mark Morton**; Alexander South	William Howarth	Samuel Emmett (Ind Nat); Edward Newton (Ind)

== See also ==
- Members of the New South Wales Legislative Assembly, 1925–1927
