= Electoral results for the district of Petersham =

Election results for Petersham, New South Wales, Australia

Petersham, an electoral district of the Legislative Assembly in the Australian state of New South Wales, has had two incarnations, the first from 1894 to 1920, the second from 1930 to 1941.

Election	Member	Party
1894	Llewellyn Jones	Ind. Free Trade
1895	Llewellyn Jones	Free Trade
1898	John Cohen	Protectionist
1901	John Cohen	Liberal Reform
1904	John Cohen	Liberal Reform
1907	John Cohen	Liberal Reform
1910	John Cohen	Liberal Reform
1913	John Cohen	Liberal Reform
1917	John Cohen	Nationalist
1919 by	Sydney Shillington	Nationalist
Election	Member	Party
1930	Joe Lamaro	Labor
1932	Eric Solomon	United Australia
1935	Eric Solomon	United Australia
1938	Eric Solomon	United Australia

== Election results ==
=== Elections in the 1930s ===
==== 1938 ====
1938 New South Wales state election: Petersham
Party	Candidate	Votes	%	±%
United Australia	Eric Solomon	9,033	50.5	+1.4
Labor	Bill Sheahan	8,861	49.5	+4.4
Total formal votes		17,894	98.3	+0.2
Informal votes		307	1.7	−0.2
Turnout		18,201	97.1	+1.2
United Australia hold		Swing	−1.3	

==== 1935 ====
1935 New South Wales state election: Petersham
Party	Candidate	Votes	%	±%
United Australia	Eric Solomon	8,701	49.1	−0.3
Labor (NSW)	Bill Sheahan	7,995	45.1	+1.8
Federal Labor	Patrick Colbourne	749	4.2	−2.9
Independent	Jervis Blackman	286	1.6	+1.6
Total formal votes		17,731	98.1	−0.5
Informal votes		341	1.9	+0.5
Turnout		18,072	95.9	−0.2
Two-party-preferred result
United Australia	Eric Solomon	9,178	51.8	−1.7
Labor (NSW)	Patrick Colbourne	8,553	48.2	+1.7
United Australia hold		Swing	−1.7	

==== 1932 ====
1932 New South Wales state election: Petersham
Party	Candidate	Votes	%	±%
United Australia	Eric Solomon	8,499	49.4	+11.7
Labor (NSW)	Joe Lamaro	7,453	43.3	−18.1
Federal Labor	Patrick Colbourne	1,221	7.1	+7.1
Independent	Edgar Vale	30	0.2	+0.2
Total formal votes		17,203	98.6	+0.6
Informal votes		250	1.4	−0.6
Turnout		17,453	96.1	+2.6
Two-party-preferred result
United Australia	Eric Solomon	9,213	53.5	
Labor (NSW)	Joe Lamaro	7,990	46.5	
United Australia gain from Labor (NSW)		Swing	N/A	

==== 1930 ====
1930 New South Wales state election: Petersham
Party	Candidate	Votes	%	±%
Labor	Joe Lamaro	10,365	61.4	
Nationalist	Henry Morton	6,367	37.7	
Communist	Annie Ford	138	0.8	
Total formal votes		16,870	98.0	
Informal votes		335	2.0	
Turnout		17,205	93.5	
Labor win		(new seat)		

Joe Lamaro (Labor) was the sitting member for the abolished district of Enmore which was largely replaced by Petersham.

District re-created

==== 1920 - 1930 ====
District abolished District abolished

=== Elections in the 1910s ===
==== 1919 by-election ====
1919 Petersham by-election Saturday 22 March 1919
Party	Candidate	Votes	%	±%
Nationalist	Sydney Shillington	2,633	51.0	−10.6
Labor	Barney Olde	2,377	46.1	+14.8
Independent	Donald Croal	150	2.9	
Total formal votes		5,160	99.3	0.0
Informal votes		35	0.7	0.0
Turnout		5,195	45.6 (Note: Estimate based on a roll of 11,404 at the 1917 election.)	−18.0
Nationalist hold		Swing	N/A	

The by-election was caused by resignation of John Cohen (Nationalist) who had accepted an appointment as a Judge of the District Court.

==== 1917 ====
1917 New South Wales state election: Petersham
Party	Candidate	Votes	%	±%
Nationalist	John Cohen	4,441	61.7	−38.3
Labor	James Bourke	2,253	31.3	+31.3
Independent	John Lucas	507	7.0	+7.0
Total formal votes		7,201	99.3	
Informal votes		49	0.7	
Turnout		7,250	63.6	
Nationalist hold		Swing	−38.3	

==== 1913 ====
1913 New South Wales state election: Petersham
Party	Candidate	Votes	%	±%
Liberal Reform	John Cohen	unopposed		
Liberal Reform hold				

==== 1910 ====
1910 New South Wales state election: Petersham
Party	Candidate	Votes	%	±%
Liberal Reform	John Cohen	4,911	63.1	
Labour	Adamson Dawson	2,866	36.9	
Total formal votes		7,777	99.0	
Informal votes		82	1.0	
Turnout		7,859	71.7	
Liberal Reform hold				

=== Elections in the 1900s ===
==== 1907 ====
1907 New South Wales state election: Petersham
Party	Candidate	Votes	%	±%
Liberal Reform	John Cohen	4,398	79.2	
Labour	John Kohen	1,082	19.5	
Independent	William Pickup	73	1.3	
Total formal votes		5,553	98.4	
Informal votes		90	1.6	
Turnout		5,643	62.6	
Liberal Reform hold				

==== 1904 ====
1904 New South Wales state election: Petersham
Party	Candidate	Votes	%	±%
Liberal Reform	John Cohen	2,940	60.6	
Independent Liberal	Henry Davis	1,897	39.1	
Progressive	Adam Pringle	13	0.3	
Total formal votes		4,850	99.2	
Informal votes		41	0.8	
Turnout		4,891	56.8	
Liberal Reform hold				

Petersham lost part of the district to Annandale, Ashfield and Canterbury and was expanded to include part of Marrickville. The member for Petersham was John Cohen (Liberal Reform). The member for Marrickville was Richard McCoy (Liberal Reform) who successfully contested that seat.

==== 1901 ====
1901 New South Wales state election: Petersham
Party	Candidate	Votes	%	±%
Liberal Reform	John Cohen	1,436	58.6	+21.7
Independent Liberal	Joseph Cockbaine	950	38.8	
Independent	William Richardson	64	2.6	
Total formal votes		2,450	99.3	−0.6
Informal votes		18	0.7	+0.6
Turnout		2,468	65.6	−2.8
Member changed to Liberal Reform from Progressive				

=== Elections in the 1890s ===
==== 1898 ====
1898 New South Wales colonial election: Petersham
Party	Candidate	Votes	%	±%
National Federal	John Cohen	674	37.0	
Free Trade	Llewellyn Jones	626	34.3	
Ind. Free Trade	Percy Hordern	524	28.7	
Total formal votes		1,824	99.8	
Informal votes		3	0.2	
Turnout		1,827	68.4	
National Federal gain from Free Trade				

==== 1895 ====
1895 New South Wales colonial election: Petersham
Party	Candidate	Votes	%	±%
Free Trade	Llewellyn Jones	643	49.5	
Labour	Percy Hordern	371	28.5	
Ind. Free Trade	Cornelius Danahey	279	21.5	
Ind. Protectionist	George Wallace	7	0.5	
Total formal votes		1,300	99.2	
Informal votes		11	0.8	
Turnout		1,311	61.5	
Free Trade hold				

==== 1894 ====
1894 New South Wales colonial election: Petersham
Party	Candidate	Votes	%	±%
Ind. Free Trade	Llewellyn Jones	627	34.4	
Free Trade	Benjamin Short	386	21.2	
Labour	William Webster	342	18.8	
Ind. Free Trade	Cornelius Danahey	258	14.2	
Protectionist	William Robson	174	9.6	
Independent	John Gelding	16	0.9	
Ind. Free Trade	George Withers	11	0.6	
Ind. Free Trade	John Bell	7	0.4	
Total formal votes		1,821	99.7	
Informal votes		6	0.3	
Turnout		1,827	83.9	
Ind. Free Trade win		(new seat)		
