= 1919 Petersham state by-election =

Election result for Petersham, New South Wales, Australia

A by-election was held for the New South Wales Legislative Assembly electorate of Petersham on 22 March 1919 because of the resignation of John Cohen (Nationalist) who had accepted an appointment as a Judge of the District Court. H. V. Evatt alleges that this was part of a deal between William Holman and the Liberals that had led to the Nationalist government in 1917.

== Dates ==
Date	Event
30 January 1919	John Cohen resigned.
5 March 1919	Writ of election issued by the Speaker of the Legislative Assembly.
8 March 1919	Nominations
22 March 1919	Polling day
5 April 1919	Return of writ

== Result ==
1919 Petersham by-election Saturday 22 March 1919
Party	Candidate	Votes	%	±%
Nationalist	Sydney Shillington	2,633	51.0	−10.6
Labor	Barney Olde	2,377	46.1	+14.8
Independent	Donald Croal	150	2.9	
Total formal votes		5,160	99.3	0.0
Informal votes		35	0.7	0.0
Turnout		5,195	45.6 (Note: Estimate based on a roll of 11,404 at the 1917 election.)	−18.0
Nationalist hold		Swing	N/A	

== See also ==
- Electoral results for the district of Petersham
- List of New South Wales state by-elections
