= Electoral results for the district of Enmore =

Election results for Enmore, New South Wales, Australia

Enmore, an electoral district of the Legislative Assembly in the Australian state of New South Wales had two incarnations, from 1913 to 1920 and from 1927 until 1930.

First incarnation (1913–1920)
Election	Member	Party
1913	David Hall	Labor
1917	David Hall	Nationalist
Second incarnation (1927–1930)
Election	Member	Party
1927	Joe Lamaro	Labor

== Election results ==
=== Elections in the 1920s ===
==== 1927 ====
1927 New South Wales state election: Enmore
Party	Candidate	Votes	%	±%
Labor	Joe Lamaro	7,000	57.4	
Nationalist	Henry Morton	5,198	42.6	
Total formal votes		12,198	99.0	
Informal votes		127	1.0	
Turnout		12,325	83.3	
Labor win		(new seat)		

District recreated

==== 1920 - 1927 ====
District abolished

=== Elections in the 1910s ===
==== 1917 ====
1917 New South Wales state election: Enmore
Party	Candidate	Votes	%	±%
Nationalist	David Hall	4,091	51.4	+1.6
Labor	Thomas Burke	3,787	47.6	−1.2
Independent	Andrew Macauley	45	0.6	+0.6
Ind. Socialist Labor	Dominic Healy	30	0.4	+0.4
Total formal votes		7,953	99.0	+0.3
Informal votes		80	1.0	−0.3
Turnout		8,033	63.2	−7.2
Member changed to Nationalist from Labor				

The sitting member David Hall was expelled from Labor in the November 1916 Labor split over conscription.

==== 1913 ====
1913 New South Wales state election: Enmore
Party	Candidate	Votes	%	±%
Liberal Reform	Gustav Borhsmann	4,458	49.8	
Labor	David Hall	4,368	48.8	
Independent	Wallace McKeon	129	1.4	
Total formal votes		8,955	98.7	
Informal votes		117	1.3	
Turnout		9,072	70.4	

1913 New South Wales state election: Enmore: Second Round Saturday 13 December
Party	Candidate	Votes	%	±%
Labor	David Hall	5,235	53.9	
Liberal Reform	Gustav Bohrsmann	4,481	46.1	
Total formal votes		9,716	99.4	
Informal votes		57	0.6	
Turnout		9,773	75.8	
Labor win		(new seat)		
