= Francis Connors =

Francis Connors may refer to:

- Francis Lawrence Connors (1891–1964), also known as Frank Connors, pharmacist and politician in Quebec, Canada
- Frank Connors (1888–1963), Australian politician and trade unionist

== See also ==
- Francis Connor (disambiguation)
