= Frank Connor (disambiguation) =

Frank Connor (1936–2022) was a Scottish footballer and manager.

Frank Connor or Conner may also refer to:

- Frank Conner (athlete) (1908–1944), American Olympic athlete
- Frank Connor (politician) (1916–1982), American politician in the state of Washington
- Frank Conner (golfer) (born 1946), American golfer
- Frank Conner (murderer)
- Frankie Connor, British guitarist and disc jockey

== See also ==
- Frank Connors (1888–1963), Australian politician and trade unionist
- Francis Connors (disambiguation)
- Francis Connor (1857–1916), Australian businessman, pastoralist, and politician
