= Llewellyn Jones (politician) =

Australian politician

Llewellyn Charles Russell Jones (1855 – 13 May 1912) was an Australian politician.

He was born in Sydney, the son of solicitor John Russell. After attending Sydney Grammar School, he became a solicitor's clerk before his admission as a solicitor in 1878. He was a long-serving Petersham alderman and served as mayor from 1891 to 1894. In 1894 he was elected to the New South Wales Legislative Assembly as the Free Trade member for Petersham, serving until his defeat in 1898. Jones died at Southport in England in 1912.

Civic offices
Preceded by John Wheeler	Mayor of Petersham; 1891 – 1894	Succeeded by Alfred Rofe
New South Wales Legislative Assembly
New seat	Member for Petersham; 1894 – 1898	Succeeded by John Cohen
