= John Cohen (Australian politician) =

Australian judge and politician

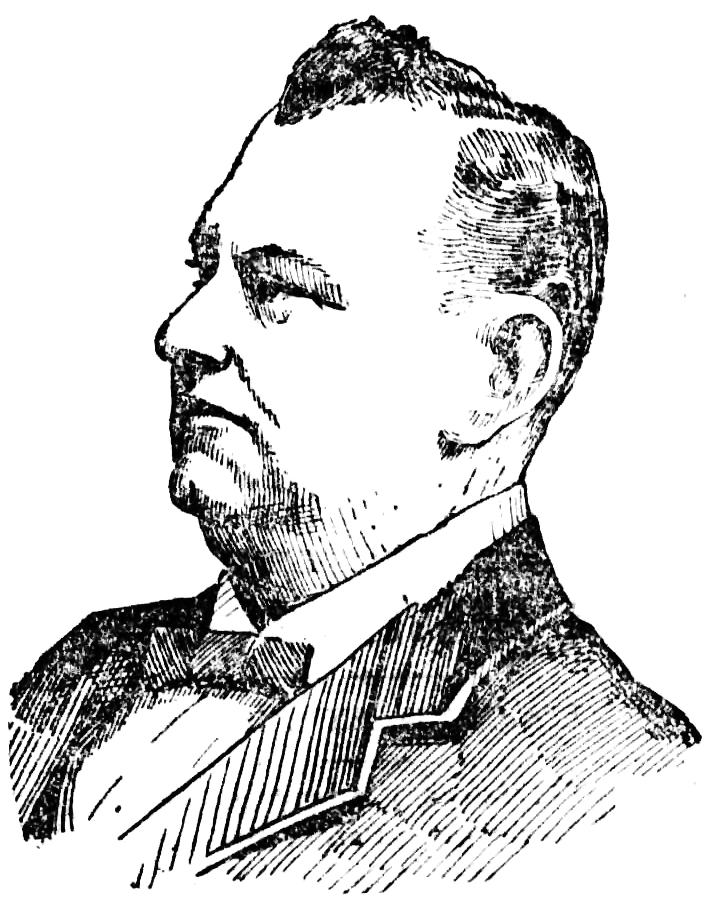
John Jacob Cohen (1859-1939), NSW politician, c1898

John Jacob Cohen (20 December 1859 – 25 March 1939) was an Australian politician.

He was born in Grafton to storekeeper Samuel Cohen and Rosetta Manser. He attended Ullamarra Public School and Grafton Grammar School and then Calder House in Redfern. He received a Bachelor of Arts with first-class honours in mathematics from the University of Sydney in 1879 and a Master of Arts in 1881. Having also studied architecture at night school, he moved to Mackay in Queensland in 1882 as a consulting engineer and architect, subsequently moving to Brisbane in 1884. He married Bertie Hollander on 12 March 1889; they had two sons. Cohen returned to Sydney in 1892 and was called to the bar in 1894. In 1898, he was elected to the New South Wales Legislative Assembly as the National Federal member for Petersham, but by 1901 he was re-elected as a Liberal. A backbencher for most of his career, he was elected Speaker in 1917. In 1919, he resigned from parliament to become a judge of the District Court, allegedly as part of a deal between William Holman and the Liberals that had led to the Nationalist government in 1917. Cohen remained on the District Court until 1929. He died in Woollahra in 1939.

New South Wales Legislative Assembly
Preceded by Llewellyn Jones	Member for Petersham; 1898–1919	Succeeded by Sydney Shillington
Preceded by Dick Meagher	Speaker of the New South Wales Legislative Assembly; 1917–1919	Succeeded by Daniel Levy
