= Eric Solomon =

Australian politician

Eric Saxby Solomon (27 June 1907 – 9 May 1985) was an Australian politician.

He was born at Cootamundra to insurance adviser Alfred Benjamin Solomon and Thirsa May, née Saxby. He attended Cootamundra High School before becoming a clerk, serving with the Registrar General's Department from 1922 to 1927, when he entered the private sector as secretary of The Market Printery Pty Ltd. On 21 June 1934 he married Olive Mary Craske, with whom he had two daughters. He was elected to the New South Wales Legislative Assembly as the United Australia Party member for Petersham in 1932, serving until his defeat in 1941. He served in the Australian Military Forces in World War II, and in 1948 was elected to Ku-ring-gai Council, serving as mayor from 1951 to 1952. He was president of the Circulation Audit Board from 1962 to 1964 and of the Australian Business Papers Association from 1961 to 1966. Solomon died in Sydney in 1985.

New South Wales Legislative Assembly
Preceded by Joe Lamaro	Member for Petersham; 1932–1941	Succeeded by Seat abolished
