= Milton Jarvie =

Australian politician

Milton Jarvie MC, ED

Member of the New South Wales Legislative Assembly for Ashfield
- In office 8 October 1927 – 12 April 1935
- Preceded by: New seat
- Succeeded by: Athol Richardson

Member of the New South Wales Legislative Assembly for Western Suburbs
- In office 30 May 1925 – 7 September 1927
- Preceded by: James Wilson
- Succeeded by: Seat abolished

Mayor of Marrickville
- In office December 1926 – 15 December 1927
- Preceded by: Edward Mackey
- Succeeded by: Benjamin Richards

Personal details
- Born: 12 July 1891 Pyramil, New South Wales
- Died: 31 January 1965 (aged 73) Concord, New South Wales
- Party: Nationalist Party (1927–31); United Australia Party (1931–35)
- Education: University of Sydney
- Occupation: Businessman

Military service
- Allegiance: Australia
- Branch/service: Royal Australian Naval Reserve; Australian Imperial Force; Citizens Military Force
- Years of service: 1910–1920; 1939–1945
- Rank: Major
- Battles/wars: First World War; Second World War
- Awards: Military Cross; Efficiency Decoration

Milton Livingstone Fredericks Jarvie, MC, ED (12 July 1891 – 31 January 1965) was an Australian politician, businessman and soldier.

Jarvie was born at Pyramul, south of Mudgee, New South Wales, to schoolteacher John Rose Shaw Jarvie and Jean Wade, née Fredericks. He attended Enmore High School and the University of Sydney, receiving a Diploma of Economics. Around 1914 he married Geraldine James. From 1915 to 1920 he served in the Australian Imperial Force's Provost Corps in the First World War, rising to the rank of major and being decorated with the Military Cross. For his later service with the Citizens Military Force, Jarvie received the Efficiency Decoration. After the war he became a business manager and an executive officer with the British Australasian Tobacco Company. In 1925 he was elected to Marrickville Council, on which he served until 1927 (he was also mayor in 1927).

In 1925, Jarvie was elected to the New South Wales Legislative Assembly as one of the Nationalist members for Western Suburbs. When single-member districts were re-introduced in 1927 he represented Ashfield, holding the seat until 1935, when he lost United Australia Party preselection. Jarvie contested the election unsuccessfully as an independent. From 1937 he was an executive officer with the Sound Proof Company, and during the Second World War he served as war area officer for Southern New South Wales. After the war (1945–47), he was director of the United Nations Relief and Rehabilitation Administration, Displaced Persons Camp in southern Austria. He married Helen Michell in 1949. Jarvie died in 1965 at Concord, New South Wales.

New South Wales Legislative Assembly
Preceded by James Wilson	Member for Western Suburbs; 1925–1927; Served alongside: Tom Hoskins, Carlo Lazzarini, Edward McTiernan, John Ness	Seat abolished
New seat	Member for Ashfield; 1927–1935	Succeeded by Athol Richardson
