= James Wilson (New South Wales politician, born 1865) =

Australian politician

James Wilson (6 December 1865 – 14 April 1927) was a New Zealand-born Australian politician.

He was born at Akaroa to shipwright John Newbegin Wilson and Marjorie, née Bow. He was educated locally and raised on a farm, marrying Jeannie Geraty on 3 December 1888 at Christchurch, with whom he had six children. He spent seventeen years from about 1885 in the Salvation Army and was appointed in charge of the Melbourne training home. Around 1902 he returned to Auckland and edited the Christian Worker, becoming a Methodist minister in 1903. He returned to New South Wales in 1913 and in 1914 went on a lecturing tour around the United Kingdom. He was a chaplain to the armed forces and saw action from 1916 to 1917, when he was invalided home. In 1920 he resigned the ministry and was elected to the New South Wales Legislative Assembly as a Progressive member for Western Suburbs. A coalitionist Progressive, he had joined the Nationalist Party by 1922. He left the Assembly in 1925 and died in Sydney in 1927.

New South Wales Legislative Assembly
Preceded by New seat	Member for Western Suburbs; 1920–1925; Served alongside: Hoskins, Lazzarini, McTiernan, Shillington/Ness	Succeeded by Milton Jarvie
