= Electoral district of Dulwich Hill =

Former state electoral district of New South Wales, Australia

Dulwich Hill was an electoral district of the Legislative Assembly in the Australian state of New South Wales, created in 1913, and named after and including the Sydney suburb of Dulwich Hill. With the introduction of proportional representation, it was absorbed into the multi-member electorate of Western Suburbs. It was recreated in 1927, but was abolished in 1968.

== Members for Dulwich Hill ==
First incarnation (1913–1920)
Member	Party	Term
Tom Hoskins	Liberal Reform	1913–1917
Tom Hoskins	Nationalist	1917–1920
Second incarnation (1927–1968)
Member	Party	Term
John Ness	Nationalist	1927–1930
Frank Connors	Labor	1930–1932
John Ness	United Australia	1932–1938
Guy Arkins	United Australia	1938–1941
George Weir	Labor	1941–1953
Cliff Mallam	Labor	1953–1968

== Election results ==
1965 New South Wales state election: Dulwich Hill
Party	Candidate	Votes	%	±%
Labor	Cliff Mallam	11,144	54.3	−3.3
Liberal	Russell Carter	9,387	45.7	+3.3
Total formal votes		20,531	98.2	−0.4
Informal votes		381	1.8	+0.4
Turnout		20,912	91.2	−1.2
Labor hold		Swing	−3.3	
