= Tom Hoskins =

Australian politician

Tom James Hoskins (13 March 1864 – 16 July 1934) was an English-born Australian politician.

He was born at Stratton-on-the-Fosse in Somerset to master mason William Hoskins and Sophia, née Carter. While a young man he arrived in New South Wales and worked as a wheelwright, eventually establishing a coachbuilding business at Dulwich Hill. He married Annie McConnell, with whom he had six children. From 1903 to 1917 he was an alderman at Petersham, serving as mayor from 1910 to 1912 and from 1915 to 1916. He was also involved in the Royal Agricultural Society from 1901 to 1934, serving as vice-president from 1918 to 1934. In 1913 he was elected to the New South Wales Legislative Assembly as the Liberal member for Dulwich Hill. During the period of proportional representation from 1920 to 1927 he was one of the members for Western Suburbs but he was not able to get preselection for a safe seat in 1927, standing unsuccessfully as an Independent Nationalist. He had served as party whip from 1917 to 1921. Hoskins died in 1934 at Marrickville.

Civic offices
Preceded by Percy Hordern	Mayor of Petersham; 1910 – 1912	Succeeded by Richard Barry
Preceded by Charles Crammond	Mayor of Petersham; 1915 – 1916	Succeeded by John Weekley
New South Wales Legislative Assembly
New district	Member for Dulwich Hill; 1913 – 1920	District abolished
New district	Member for Western Suburbs; 1920 – 1927; Served alongside: Lazzarini, McTiernan, Shillington/Ness, Wilson/Jarvie	District abolished
