= Grace Scobie =

Australian activist

Grace Scobie OBE
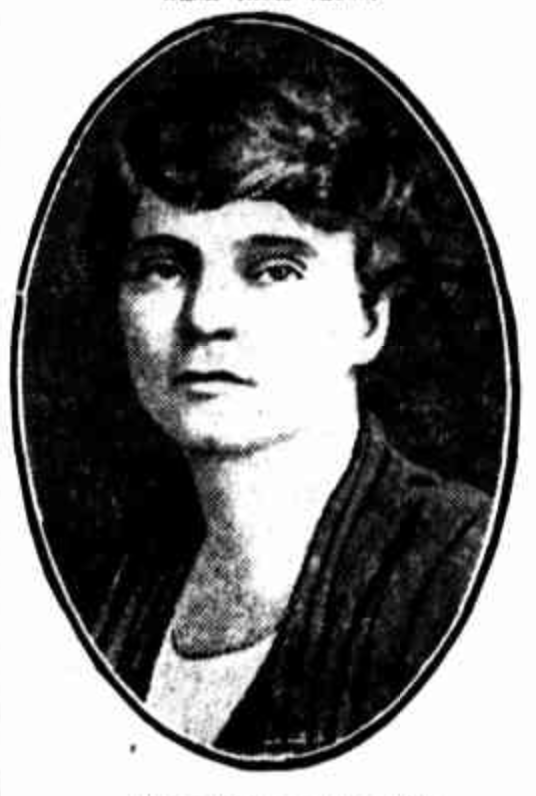
- Born: Grace Locke Scobie; 3 July 1876; Bombay, India
- Died: 2 June 1957 (aged 80); Bondi, New South Wales, Australia
- Occupation: Factory inspector
- Known for: Women's rights activism

Grace Locke Scobie OBE (3 July 1876 – 2 June 1957) was an Australian factory inspector and women's rights activist.

== Early life ==
Scobie was born in Bombay to Scottish-born saddler Robert Scobie and Elizabeth Buchanan, née Farms. Around 1878 the Scobies moved to Menindee in New South Wales. In 1901, when Robert was elected as a Labor MP to the New South Wales Legislative Assembly, they moved to Sydney.

== Career ==
Scobie worked as her father's secretary in Sydney. She was appointed inspector of factories and industrial inspector in the Department of Labour and Industry in 1916, tending to support employers over employees; she and her father both left the Labor Party as pro-conscriptionists that year. Scobie campaigned for conscription in the two referendums, served as a council member of the National Association of New South Wales from 1917 to 1918, and was given the OBE in 1918. In 1920 Labor News censured her for condoning harsh treatment of illegitimate children as a board member of the State Children Relief Board. In that year she ran for the Soldiers and Citizens Party for the state seat of Eastern Suburbs, but was not successful.

From the 1920s Scobie was a member of the National Council of Women of New South Wales, but in 1924 the political department for which she worked refused her permission to attend daytime meetings and she was forced to resign. By 1927 she had moved well away from the council, and was president of the Professional Women Workers' Association. In this role she hosted a 1925 luncheon in honour of Kathleen M. Butler, who project managed the early years of the building of Sydney Harbour Bridge, and praised "the fact Dr. Bradfield dares to place a woman in a position of trust, where merit, capacity, and initiative counts".

She ran for election again in 1932, contesting Bondi as an independent supported by the United Associations of Women, of which she was secretary. During the 1930s she worked to reduce maternal and infant mortality, and was involved with the Australian Federation of Women Voters and the Feminist Club.

== Death ==
Scobie died at Bondi in 1957.
