= Electoral district of Western Suburbs =

Former state electoral district of New South Wales, Australia

Western Suburbs was an electoral district of the Legislative Assembly in the Australian state of New South Wales in Sydney's inner western suburbs. It was created as a five-member electorate with the introduction of proportional representation in 1920, replacing Ashfield, Dulwich Hill, Leichhardt, Marrickville and Petersham. It was abolished in 1927 and replaced by Ashfield, Burwood, Croydon, Leichhardt and Marrickville.

== Members for Western Suburbs ==
Member	Party	Term	Member	Party	Term	Member	Party	Term	Member	Party	Term	Member	Party	Term
Carlo Lazzarini	Labor	1920–1927	Edward McTiernan	Labor	1920–1927	Tom Hoskins	Nationalist	1920–1927	Sydney Shillington	Nationalist	1920–1922	James Wilson	Progressive	1920–1922
Carlo Lazzarini	Labor	1920–1927	Edward McTiernan	Labor	1920–1927	Tom Hoskins	Nationalist	1920–1927	John Ness	Nationalist	1922–1927	James Wilson	Nationalist	1922–1925
Carlo Lazzarini	Labor	1920–1927	Edward McTiernan	Labor	1920–1927	Tom Hoskins	Nationalist	1920–1927	John Ness	Nationalist	1922–1927	Milton Jarvie	Nationalist	1925–1927

== Election results ==
1925 New South Wales state election: Western Suburbs
Party	Candidate	Votes	%	±%
Quota		8,320		
Nationalist	John Ness (elected 2)	9,016	18.1	+1.9
Nationalist	Tom Hoskins (elected 4)	6,975	14.0	−2.4
Nationalist	Milton Jarvie (elected 5)	3,980	8.0	+8.0
Nationalist	Henry Morton	2,443	4.9	+4.9
Nationalist	William Simpson	1,865	3.7	+0.6
Labor	Edward McTiernan (elected 1)	11,239	22.5	+3.2
Labor	Carlo Lazzarini (elected 3)	7,697	15.4	+1.3
Labor	Barney Olde	774	1.6	+1.6
Labor	James Troy	649	1.3	+1.3
Labor	Roger Ryan	99	0.2	+0.2
Independent	Alexander Huie	3,976	8.0	+2.6
Protestant Labour	Frederick Armstrong	578	1.2	+1.2
Protestant Labour	Alfred Millington	490	1.0	+1.0
Majority Labor	John Cain	133	0.3	+0.3
Total formal votes		49,914	97.5	+0.6
Informal votes		1,253	2.5	−0.6
Turnout		51,167	70.7	−3.3
Party total votes
Nationalist		24,279	48.6	−9.3
Labor		20,458	41.0	+5.0
Independent	Alexander Huie	3,976	8.0	+8.0
Protestant Labour		1,068	2.1	+2.1
Majority Labor		133	0.3	+0.3
