= Edward McTiernan =

Australian politician

The Right Honourable Sir Edward McTiernan KBE
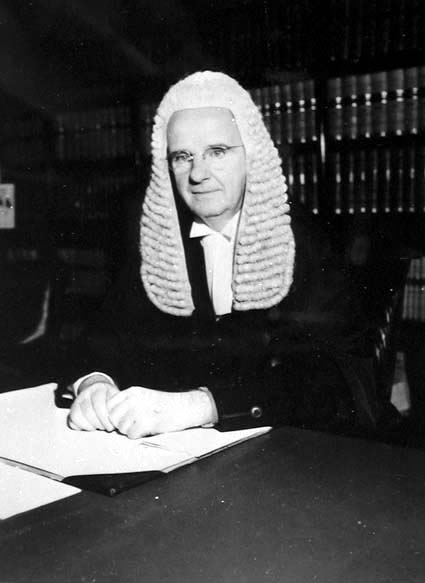
- McTiernan in his chambers, 1954.

Justice of the High Court of Australia
- In office 20 December 1930 – 12 September 1976
- Nominated by: James Scullin
- Appointed by: Lord Stonehaven
- Preceded by: Sir Isaac Isaacs
- Succeeded by: Sir Keith Aickin

Member of the Australian House of Representatives
- In office 12 October 1929 – 19 December 1930
- Preceded by: Charles Marr
- Succeeded by: Charles Marr
- Constituency: Parkes

Attorney General of New South Wales
- In office 12 April 1920 – 13 April 1922
- Premier: John Storey; James Dooley
- Preceded by: John Garland
- Succeeded by: Thomas Bavin
- In office 17 June 1925 – 26 May 1927
- Premier: Jack Lang
- Preceded by: Thomas Bavin
- Succeeded by: Andrew Lysaght

Member of the New South Wales Legislative Assembly
- In office 20 March 1920 – 7 September 1927
- Preceded by: Seat created
- Succeeded by: Seat abolished
- Constituency: Western Suburbs

Personal details
- Born: 16 February 1892 Glen Innes, New South Wales, Australia
- Died: 9 January 1990 (aged 97) Turramurra, New South Wales, Australia
- Party: Labor (to 1930)
- Spouse: Kathleen Lloyd (m. 1948)

Sir Edward Aloysius McTiernan (16 February 1892 – 9 January 1990) was an Australian lawyer, politician, and judge. He served on the High Court of Australia from 1930 to 1976, the longest-serving judge in the court's history.

McTiernan was born in Glen Innes, New South Wales. He graduated from the University of Sydney in 1915, and was called to the bar the following year. McTiernan was elected to the New South Wales Legislative Assembly in 1920, representing the Labor Party, and was soon after appointed Attorney-General of New South Wales. He served as attorney-general under John Storey, James Dooley, and Jack Lang, but left state politics in 1927. McTiernan was elected to the House of Representatives in 1929, but served for little over a year before Prime Minister James Scullin nominated him to the High Court. He was 38 at the time; only H. V. Evatt (another Scullin nominee) was appointed at a younger age. On the court, McTiernan was considered a moderate, and was known for the consistency of his decisions. He generally favoured the position of the federal government, upholding the constitutionality of contentious legislation from both sides of politics. McTiernan retired reluctantly at the age of 84, after just under 46 years on the High Court bench. He lived to the age of 97, and was the last surviving MP from the 1920s.

== Early years ==
McTiernan was born in Glen Innes, New South Wales, the second of three sons born to Isabella (née Diamond) and Patrick McTiernan. His parents were Irish Catholic immigrants; his father worked as a policeman. McTiernan began his education at Metz Public School, located in a small settlement west of Hillgrove. He and his family moved to Sydney in 1900, when he was about eight. He completed his education at Catholic schools, Christian Brothers' High School, Lewisham, and St Mary's Cathedral College.

McTiernan left school in 1908 initially lacking the funds to attend university, instead joining the Commonwealth Public Service as a clerk. He eventually began studying part-time at the University of Sydney, graduating with a Bachelor of Arts in 1912. He subsequently served his articles of clerkship at Sly & Russell while completing a Bachelor of Laws, graduating with first-class honours in 1915. He was called to the bar the following year and was taken on as an associate of Justice George Rich, whom he would eventually join on the High Court. He was rejected for military service during World War I due to an arm fracture sustained in childhood that had never properly healed.

== Political career ==
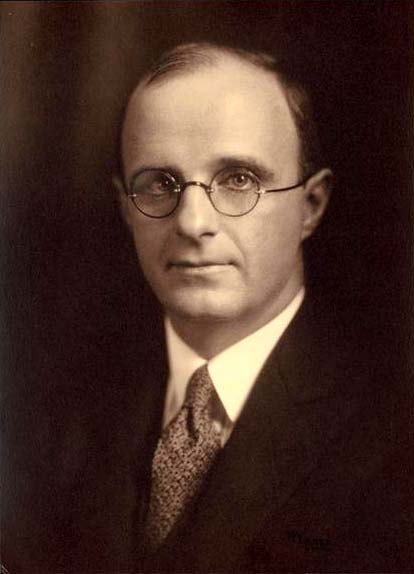
McTiernan as a member of the New South Wales Legislative Assembly.

After five years as a barrister, McTiernan was elected to the New South Wales Legislative Assembly in 1920 as the Member for Western Suburbs. McTiernan served in the ministry as Attorney-General of New South Wales from April 1920 to April 1922 and again from June 1925 to May 1927, He was heavily involved in Premier Jack Lang's attempt to abolish the New South Wales Legislative Council. He retired from the Assembly in 1927 and took up a position as a law lecturer with his alma mater. Two years later, however, he was elected to federal parliament as the member for Parkes. This was to be short-lived, as in 1930, one year into McTiernan's term, Prime Minister James Scullin nominated him to the High Court of Australia, along with H. V. Evatt. Their appointment was controversial, due to their youth (McTiernan was 38 and Evatt 36), perceived inexperience, and political connections – both were members of the Labor Party up until taking office, and the Labor caucus had publicly resolved "that the government should appoint to the bench two men known to have social views sympathetic to Labor".

== High Court ==
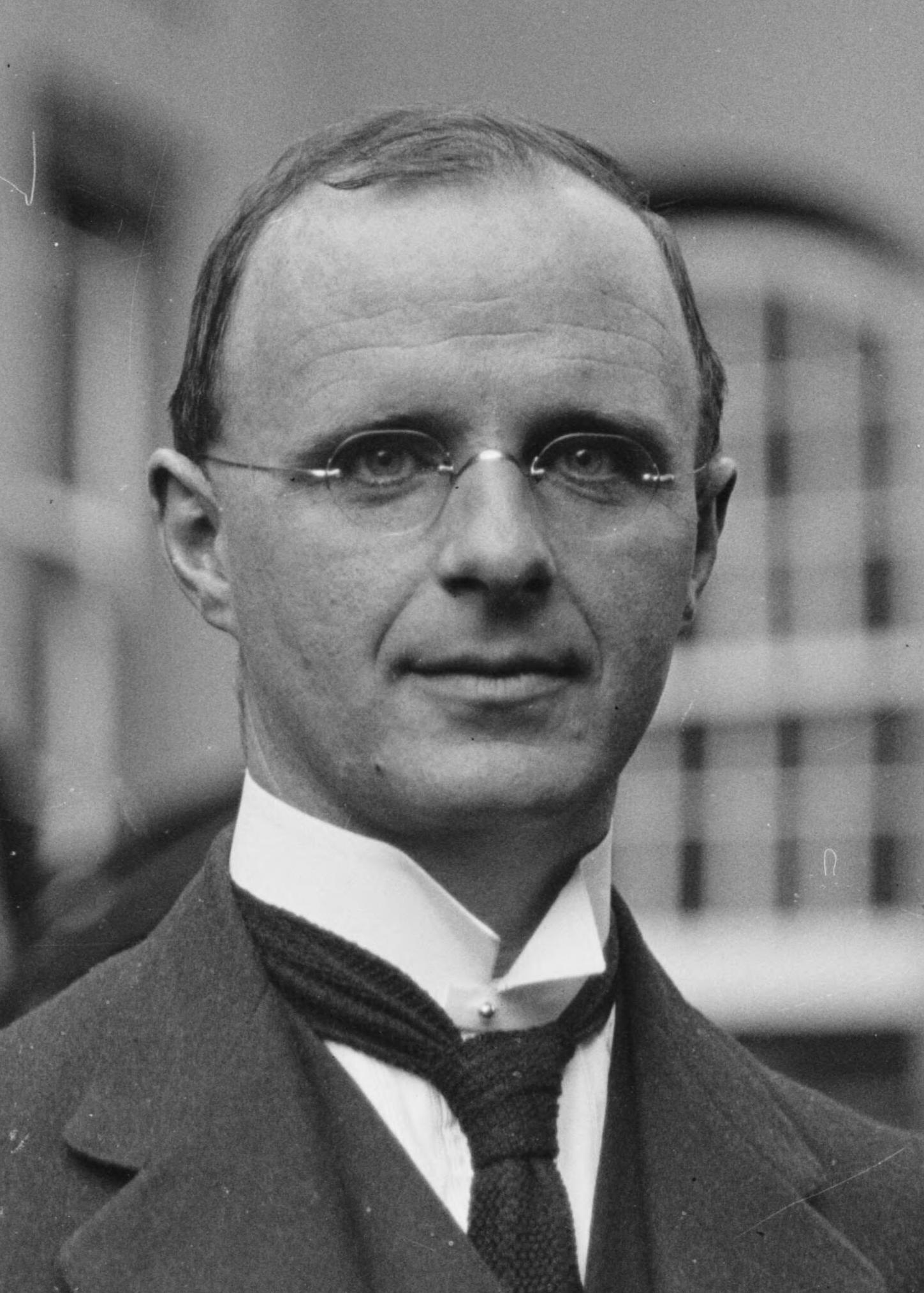
McTiernan c. 1930

As a judge of the High Court, McTiernan was involved in several significant cases in Australian legal history, including Bank of New South Wales v Commonwealth, which struck down an attempt to nationalise the banks, Australian Communist Party v The Commonwealth, which struck down an attempt to ban the Communist Party of Australia and R v Kirby; ex parte Boilermakers' Society of Australia, which reinforced the doctrine of the separation of powers. He was the sole dissenter in Attorney-General (Vic) ex rel Dale v Commonwealth (1945), which struck down the Chifley government's Pharmaceutical Benefits Scheme and triggered a constitutional amendment. He served under five Chief Justices - Sir Isaac Isaacs, Sir Frank Gavan Duffy, Sir John Latham, Sir Owen Dixon and Sir Garfield Barwick, and was knighted himself in 1951.

McTiernan was one of only eight justices of the High Court to have served in the Parliament of Australia prior to his appointment to the Court; the others were Edmund Barton, Richard O'Connor, Isaac Isaacs, H. B. Higgins, John Latham, Garfield Barwick, and Lionel Murphy. He was also one of six justices to have served in the Parliament of New South Wales, along with Barton, O'Connor, Albert Piddington, Adrian Knox and H. V. Evatt.

McTiernan was a member of the High Court for 46 years, making him the longest-serving judge in its history. This record is unlikely to be broken, as a constitutional change in 1977 introduced compulsory retirement ages for federal judges; a justice of the High Court must now retire at 70. McTiernan had no intention of resigning from the bench even into the 1970s, but, after breaking a hip at the age of 84 in 1976 while chasing a cricket in his hotel with a rolled up newspaper, Chief Justice Barwick's refusal to include a wheelchair ramp in the design of the new High Court building prompted his retirement.

=== Secret inquiry ===
In 1943, McTiernan was approached by Attorney-General H. V. Evatt to conduct an inquiry into claims that test results at the Aircraft Production Commission Testing Laboratory in Sydney had been fabricated. This might have compromised the structural integrity of Bristol Beaufort bombers being used by the Royal Australian Air Force (RAAF). Arthur Calwell, the Minister for Information, applied strict wartime censorship to the inquiry, with no press coverage allowed. The full report has never been made public, although a summary prepared for cabinet is held by the National Archives. McTiernan was effectively granted the powers of a Royal Commissioner. His inquiry is the third and most recent occasion on which a sitting High Court judge was called upon to investigate a matter on behalf of the federal government (usually regarded as a breach of separation of powers). The other two instances occurred during World War I, when George Rich and Samuel Griffith conducted Royal Commissions.

== Personal life ==
According to Jack Lang, McTiernan was "very much attached to his parents". He did not marry until the age of 56, wedding Kathleen Lloyd on 27 December 1948 at St Roch's Catholic Church, Glen Iris, Melbourne. The couple had no children. McTiernan died in Turramurra, Sydney, on 9 January 1990, at the age of 97. He was buried in Rookwood Cemetery.

New South Wales Legislative Assembly
| New district | Member for Western Suburbs; 1920–1927; With: Lazzarini, Hoskins, Shillington/Ness, Wilson/Jarvie | District abolished |
Political offices
| Preceded by Jack FitzGerald | Minister for Justice; 1920 | Succeeded by William McKell |
| Preceded by John Garland | Attorney General of New South Wales; 1920–1921 | Succeeded by Thomas Bavin |
| Preceded by Thomas Bavin | Attorney General of New South Wales; 1921–1922 | Succeeded by Thomas Bavin |
| Preceded by Thomas Bavin | Attorney General of New South Wales; 1925–1927 | Succeeded by Andrew Lysaght |
Diplomatic posts
| Preceded by Sir Timothy Coghlan | Agent-General for New South Wales (acting); 1926 | Succeeded by The Viscount Chelmsford |
Parliament of Australia
| Preceded by Charles Marr | Member for Parkes; 1929–1930 | Succeeded by Charles Marr |
Legal offices
| Preceded by Sir Isaac Isaacs | Puisne Justice of the High Court of Australia; 1930–1976 | Succeeded by Sir Keith Aickin |
