= Joe Lamaro =

Australian politician

Joseph Lamaro (27 July 1895 – 22 May 1951) was an Australian politician.

Born in Redfern to shopkeeper Deico Lamaro and Maria Giuseppa Taranto, Italian migrants, he attended St Joseph's School in Newtown and St Patrick's College in Goulburn before studying at the University of Sydney, receiving a Bachelor of Arts in 1915 and a Bachelor of Law in 1922. He served in the Australian Imperial Force's 18th Battalion from 1916 to 1917 in the signals unit, seeing action at Ypres and the Somme. He was called to the Bar in 1922 and a member of the first Australian Board of Control from 1924 to 1927. In 1927 he was elected to the New South Wales Legislative Assembly as the Labor member for Enmore, shifting to Petersham in 1930 and Leichhardt in 1932. Lamaro served as Minister of Justice from 1930 to 1931 and Attorney-General from 1931 to 1932. In 1934 he resigned his seat to contest the federal seat of Watson, but he was unsuccessful and returned to law as a solicitor. He worked in private law firms until 1940 and was recalled to the Bar in 1941; in 1943 he was appointed a Crown Prosecutor and in 1947 a District Court judge. Lamaro died in 1951 at Hay.

New South Wales Legislative Assembly
New district	Member for Enmore; 1927 – 1930	District abolished
New district	Member for Petersham; 1930 – 1932	Succeeded by Eric Solomon
Preceded by Barney Olde	Member for Leichhardt; 1932 – 1934	Succeeded by Claude Matthews
Political offices
Preceded by John Lee	Minister for Justice; 1930 – 1931	Succeeded by William McKell
Preceded by Andrew Lysaght	Attorney General of New South Wales; 1931 – 1932	Succeeded by Daniel Levy
