= Carlo Lazzarini =

Australian politician

The Honourable Carlo Lazzarini
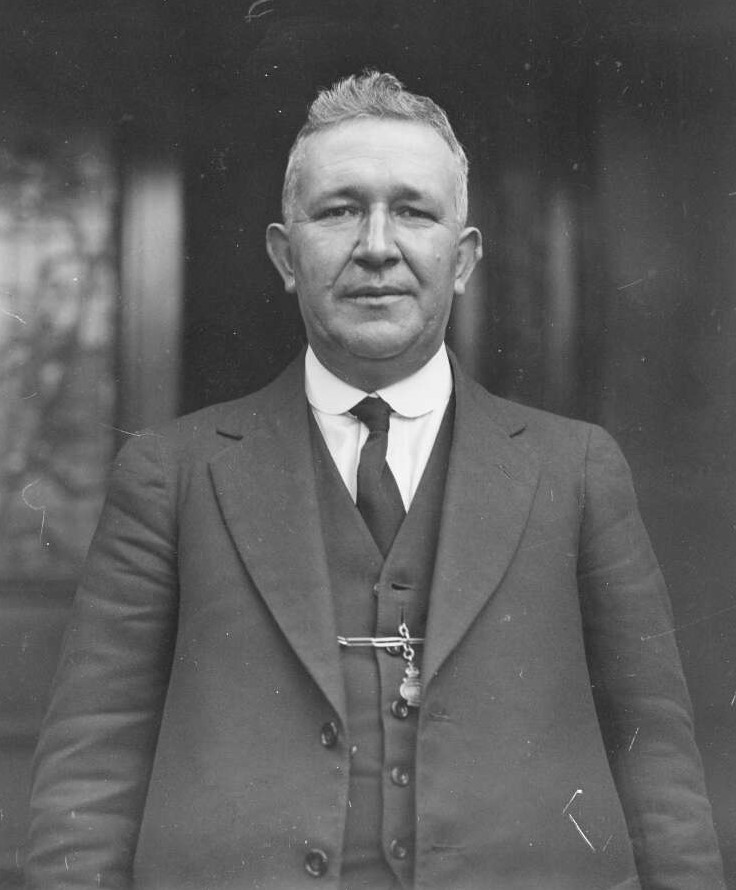

Colonial Secretary of New South Wales
- In office 17 June 1925 – 26 May 1927
- Premier: Jack Lang
- Preceded by: Charles Oakes
- Succeeded by: Mark Gosling

Minister for State Industrial Enterprises
- In office 20 December 1921 – 13 April 1922
- Premier: James Dooley
- Preceded by: Stephen Perdriau
- Succeeded by: Thomas Henley
- In office 10 October – 20 December 1921
- Premier: James Dooley
- Preceded by: Position established
- Succeeded by: Stephen Perdriau

Member of the New South Wales Legislative Assembly for the Western Suburbs
- In office 20 March 1920 – 8 October 1927 Serving with Edward McTiernan, Tom Hoskins, Sydney Shillington/John Ness and James Wilson/Milton Jarvie
- Preceded by: Electorate established
- Succeeded by: Electorate abolished

Member of the New South Wales Legislative Assembly for Marrickville
- In office 8 October 1927 – 26 November 1952
- Preceded by: Himself (re-established)
- Succeeded by: Norm Ryan
- In office 24 March 1917 – 20 March 1920
- Preceded by: Thomas Crawford
- Succeeded by: Electorate abolished Himself (re-established)

Personal details
- Born: 24 April 1880 Wombat, Colony of New South Wales
- Died: 26 November 1952 (aged 72) Lewisham, New South Wales, Australia
- Resting place: Rookwood Cemetery
- Party: Industrial Labor (1936–1939); Lang Labor (1932–1936); Labor (until 1932; from 1939)
- Spouse: Myra Hurley (m. 1919–1952)
- Relations: Bert Lazzarini (brother)

Carlo Camillo Lazzarini (Italian: [ˈkarlo kaˈmillo laddzaˈriːni]; 24 April 1880 – 26 November 1952), also known as Charlie Lazzarini, was an Australian politician affiliated with the Labor Party. He was elected as a member of the New South Wales Legislative Assembly, where he served for 35 years.

== Early years ==
The son of Italian immigrant Piedro (Peter) Lazzarini and his wife Hannah (Annie) Stubbs, Lazzarini was born at Wombat, near Young, New South Wales. He was educated at the Young convent school and Young Superior Public School, before becoming a tailor's apprentice.

Lazzarini became active in the union movement and the Labor Party, joining the Young Labor League in 1899. He became secretary and president of the league and was campaign secretary for Chris Watson in the 1898 New South Wales election and the first federal election in 1901. He was also strongly involved in the predominantly Irish Catholic community, acting as district secretary of the Hibernian Australasian Catholic Benefit Society and attending the founding meeting of the Irish National Association.

After moving to Sydney, Lazzarini was secretary and president of the Federated Clothing Trades' Union from 1912 to 1917. A member of the moderates faction, he was strongly against conscription in the First World War, and in 1916 became a founding member of the Industrial Vigilance Committee, which was responsible later that year for the expulsion from the Labor Party of conscription advocates such as prime minister Billy Hughes and premier William Holman. On this committee until 1919, he was also a member of the party central executive in 1916 and 1917, and was vice-president of the No Imperial Federation League in 1917.

== New South Wales Parliament ==
At the 1917 state election, Lazzarini was elected as member for Marrickville, defeating Thomas Crawford, who had left the Labor Party. He was the first member of the New South Wales parliament with an Italian name, and two years later his brother Bert Lazzarini became the first member of the federal parliament with an Italian name when he won the seat of Werriwa. In the same year, on 26 April 1919, Carlo married Myra Hurley at St Brigid's church in Marrickville. They had one son.

In 1920, the Legislative Assembly was elected from multi-member districts, and Lazzarini was elected as one of the members for Western Suburbs. He was Labor Party whip in 1920–21, and minister for state industrial enterprises in 1921–22. From 1922 until 1925 he was a member of the Catholic-reformist group and opposed union extremists in favour of majority parliamentary opinion. In 1923, he also served as vice president of the Australian Industrial Christian Fellowship Council.

Appointed to Jack Lang's first cabinet as chief secretary in 1925, Lazzarini was one of the Labor parliamentarians who clashed with Lang over proposed regulations in 1926. He was subsequently dropped from the cabinet in May 1927, after also serving two months as acting secretary for mines. The Lang government lost power at the 1927 election, however Lazzarini was re-elected by the reinstated seat of Marrickville. Labor regained government in 1930, only to lose it after controversies of 1932, culminating in the governor withdrawing Lang's commission. Lazzarini maintained his opposition to Lang and his dictatorial style, one of the few in the New South Wales caucus to openly do so. As a result, he and others were expelled from the party in August 1936, only to be readmitted to the federal unity conference in 1937.

Lazzarini joined the Industrial Labor Party in 1938, and continued to apply pressure to Lang, who was finally ousted in August 1939. Lazzarini served as an assistant minister in the next Labor government from 1941 until 1944. He was still member for Marrickville, in his 13th term as a member of parliament, when he died of heart disease in Lewisham in 1952. Carlo's great-great-grandniece is Courtney Houssos who is a member of the New South Wales Legislative Council

New South Wales Legislative Assembly
Preceded by Thomas Crawford	Member for Marrickville; 1917 – 1920	District abolished
New district	Member for Western Suburbs; 1920 – 1927; Served alongside: Hoskins, McTiernan, Shillington/Ness, Wilson/Jarvie	District abolished
New district	Member for Marrickville; 1927 – 1952	Succeeded by Norm Ryan
Political offices
New title	Minister for State Industrial Enterprises; 1921	Post abolished
New title	Minister for State Industrial Enterprises; 1921 – 1922	Succeeded by Thomas Henley as Minister for Railways and State Industrial Enterprises
Preceded by Charles Oakes	Colonial Secretary of New South Wales; 1925 – 1927	Succeeded by Mark Gosling
