= Electoral district of Enmore =

Former state electoral district in New South Wales, Australia

Enmore was an electoral district of the Legislative Assembly in the Australian state of New South Wales, created in 1913. It included the suburb of Enmore in Sydney's Inner West. With the introduction of proportional representation, it was absorbed into the multi-member electorate of Botany. It was recreated in 1927, but was abolished in 1930 and partly replaced by Petersham.

== Members for Enmore ==
First incarnation (1913–1920)
Member	Party	Term
David Hall	Labor	1913–1916
David Hall	Nationalist	1916–1920
Second incarnation (1927–1930)
Member	Party	Term
Joe Lamaro	Labor	1927–1930

== Election results ==
1927 New South Wales state election: Enmore
Party	Candidate	Votes	%	±%
Labor	Joe Lamaro	7,000	57.4	
Nationalist	Henry Morton	5,198	42.6	
Total formal votes		12,198	99.0	
Informal votes		127	1.0	
Turnout		12,325	83.3	
Labor win		(new seat)		
