= Electoral district of Petersham =

Former state electoral district of New South Wales, Australia

Petersham was an electoral district of the Legislative Assembly in the Australian state of New South Wales, named after and including the Sydney suburb of Petersham. It was originally created in 1894, when multi-member districts were abolished, and the four member Canterbury was largely divided between Ashfield, Burwood, Canterbury, Petersham and St George. In 1920, with the introduction of proportional representation, it was absorbed into the five member district of Western Suburbs, along with Ashfield, Dulwich Hill, Leichhardt and Marrickville. It was recreated in 1930, partly replacing Enmore but was abolished in 1941, with parts of the district going to Dulwich Hill and Marrickville.

== Members for Petersham ==
First incarnation (1894–1920)
Member	Party	Term
Llewellyn Jones	Ind. Free Trade	1894–1895
Llewellyn Jones	Free Trade	1895–1898
John Cohen	Protectionist	1898–1901
John Cohen	Liberal Reform	1901–1917
John Cohen	Nationalist	1917–1919
Sydney Shillington	Nationalist	1919–1920
Second incarnation (1930–1941)
Member	Party	Term
Joe Lamaro	Labor	1930–1932
Eric Solomon	United Australia	1932–1941

== Election results ==
1938 New South Wales state election: Petersham
Party	Candidate	Votes	%	±%
United Australia	Eric Solomon	9,033	50.5	+1.4
Labor	Bill Sheahan	8,861	49.5	+4.4
Total formal votes		17,894	98.3	+0.2
Informal votes		307	1.7	−0.2
Turnout		18,201	97.1	+1.2
United Australia hold		Swing	−1.3	
