= Frank Connors =

Australian politician and trade unionist

Francis Patrick (Frank) Connors (12 January 1888 – 6 November 1963) was an Australian politician and trade unionist. He served as a member of the Labor Party in the New South Wales Legislative Assembly from 1930 to 1932, representing the electorate of Dulwich Hill.

Connors was born in Paterson and received his education in Morpeth, located in the Hunter Region. Although he initially worked as an engineer, he transitioned into a career as a union official in his thirties. From 1924 to 1929, he served as the assistant state secretary and an organizer for the Australasian Society of Engineers. He was elected to the Legislative Assembly for Dulwich Hill at the 1930 state election, defeating Nationalist John Ness, but lost the seat to Ness amidst the statewide Labor defeat of 1932. Connors again contested Dulwich Hill in 1935, but was once again defeated by Ness.

Connors returned to the trade union movement after his parliamentary defeat, serving as state secretary of the Australian Society of Engineers from 1932 until 1943. He subsequently served as its federal secretary from 1943 until 1953. He remained heavily involved in Labor politics; he was expelled from the party by a special conference in 1936 and joined the left-wing splinter Industrial Labor Party. Upon the readmission of the ILP into Labor in 1939, he was elected to the Labor central executive, but in 1940 joined the State Labor Party split, serving on its executive until 1941. He rejoined the Labor Party soon after, and again served on the official Labor executive from 1942 until 1953.

Connors died in 1963, and was buried in the Roman Catholic section of Rookwood Cemetery.

New South Wales Legislative Assembly
| Preceded by John Ness | Member for Dulwich Hill; 1930 – 1932 | Succeeded by John Ness |
