= Alexander Huie =

- Born: Alexander Gordon Huie; 16 October 1869; Tayco, Riverina, New South Wales, Australia
- Died: 7 November 1964 (aged 95); Lake Cargelligo, New South Wales, Australia
- Occupations: Journalist, single tax campaigner
- Organization: Single Tax League
- Other political affiliations: Liberal Reform (1904-1907); Independent (1925)
- Spouse(s): Annie Bertha Lark, née Bartlett (m. 1921; died 1948)

Alexander Gordon Huie (16 October 1869 – 7 November 1964) was an Australian journalist and single tax campaigner.

Huie was born at Tayco in the Riverina to Scottish farmer Alexander Huie and Mary Eliza, née Carige, who had been born in British Grenada. His family all supported the temperance movement. Huie moved to Lake Cargelligo in 1883 to work as a carpenter, and read Henry George's Progress and Poverty in 1889. He became a correspondent for the Hillston Spectator and was appointed secretary of the local progress committee. He contested the seat of Lachlan in 1894 and would go on to unsuccessfully contest eleven more elections at all levels of government. In 1901 he became founding honorary secretary of the Sydney Single Tax League, although he supported Joseph Carruthers' Liberal and Reform Association at the 1904 and 1907 state elections.

Huie founded the single tax journal the Standard in December 1905, remaining editor and secretary of the Single Tax League until December 1953. He had about 220 letters published in the Sydney Morning Herald between 1916 and 1962, and was a strong supporter of proportional representation. He married Annie Bertha Lark, née Bartlett, a Maltese-born widow, on 1 October 1921 in a Methodist ceremony at Ashfield, where they settled; Annie would predecease him in 1948. He regularly spoke in the Sydney Domain. Huie died in 1964 visiting Lake Cargelligo, where he is buried with Presbyterian forms.
