= Barney Olde =

Politician from New South Wales, Australia

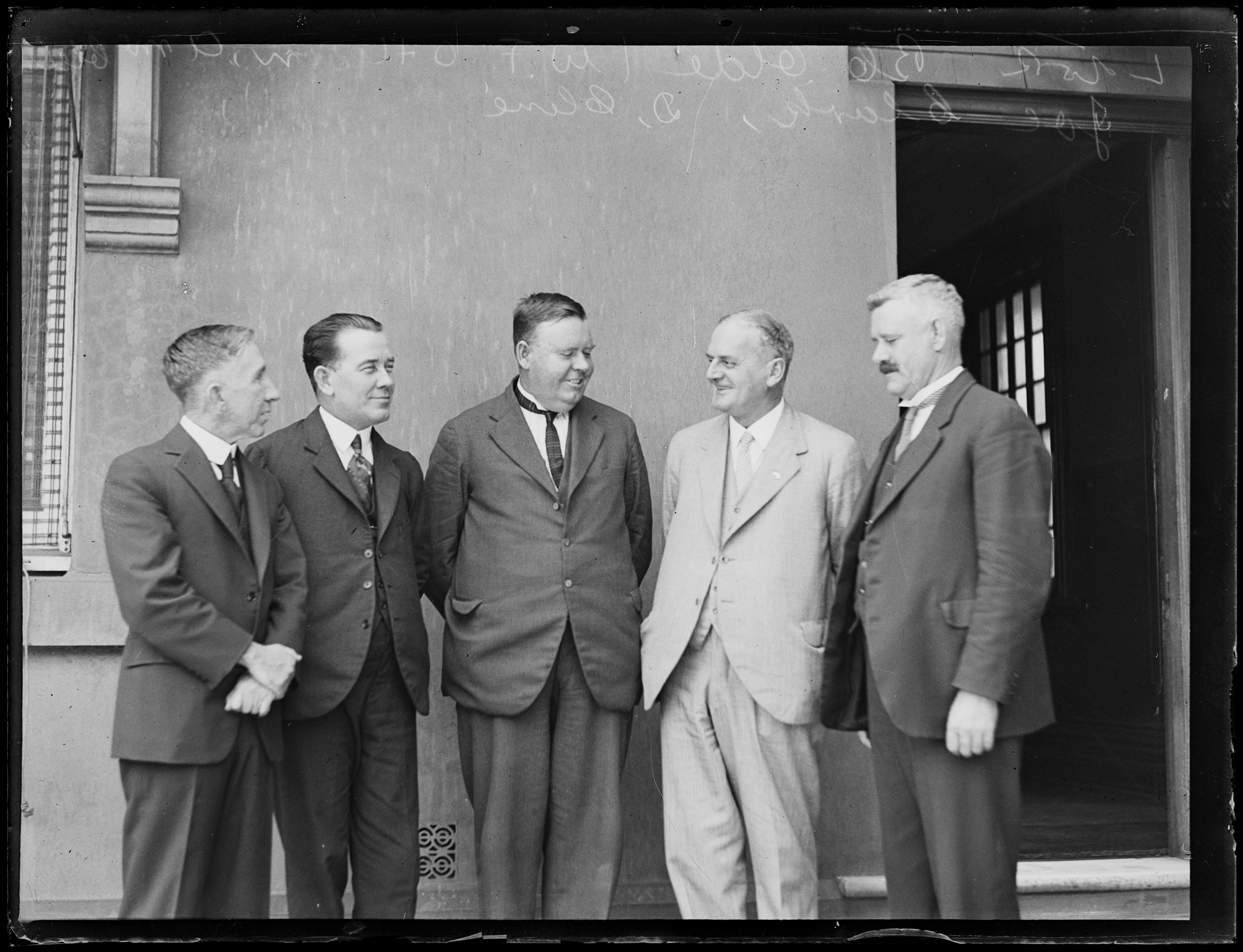
Olde (left) with fellow Labor MPs Walter O'Hearn, Alf McClelland, Joe Clark and Daniel Clyne

Bernard Clarence "Barney" Olde (1 January 1882 – 20 November 1932) was an Australian politician. He was a Labor Party member of the New South Wales Legislative Assembly from 1927 to 1932, representing the electorate of Leichhardt.

Olde was born at Vittoria, near Bathurst to George and Mary Ann Olde as the youngest of eight siblings. He was raised in Petersham in suburban Sydney, and educated at the Christian Brothers' school at Lewisham. A clerk by profession, he worked alternately in the Railways refreshment rooms, as an estate agent, and in the office of the Labor Daily newspaper. He was a foundation member of the Clerks' Union, and served as the secretary and president of the Petersham League.

Olde was elected to parliament on his fourth attempt when, in 1927, he won the newly recreated safe Labor seat of Leichhardt. He had previously contested a 1919 by-election for Petersham, and the 1920 and 1925 elections for Western Suburbs. He was re-elected in 1930 and 1932, but died in office later in 1932. He was buried at Rookwood Cemetery. Olde was succeeded in Leichhardt by Joe Lamaro, the recently defeated MLA for Petersham.

New South Wales Legislative Assembly
Preceded by Seat recreated	Member for Leichhardt; 1927 – 1932	Succeeded by Joe Lamaro
