= Sydney Shillington =

Australian politician

Sydney James Shillington (22 October 1874 – 6 June 1931) was an Australian politician.

He was born in Obley to police sergeant John Shillington and Maria, née Oates. He was educated at the local public school and was a pupil teacher from 1888 to 1889 before becoming a public servant. He worked as a clerk in the Taxation Department from 1901 to 1905 and in the Treasury Department from 1905 to 1909 before qualifying as a police magistrate. He married Ida Clift in 1911. During World War I he served in Gallipoli and France and rose to the rank of lieutenant-colonel before being invalided home. In 1919 he was elected to the New South Wales Legislative Assembly as the Nationalist member for Petersham; the next year he moved to Western Suburbs with the introduction of proportional representation, but he lost his seat in 1922. Called to the Bar in 1923, he practiced as a barrister before becoming resident magistrate and acting judge at Rabaul in Papua New Guinea in 1926. In 1930 he was forced by ill health to return home. He died in 1931 at Darlinghurst, survived by his second wife, Frances Margaret Glasson, whom he had married in 1929, and their son.

New South Wales Legislative Assembly
Preceded by John Cohen	Member for Petersham; 1919–1920	Abolished
New seat	Member for Western Suburbs; 1920–1922; Served alongside: Hoskins, Lazzarini, McTiernan, Wilson	Succeeded by John Ness
