= John Ness =

Australian politician

John Thomas Ness (20 August 1871 – 24 January 1947) was an Australian politician.

He was born at Young to shipbuilder Thomas Ness and Isabella, née Sellars. After attending public schools he was farming wheat at Temora from around 1894 to 1904. On 1 January 1898 he married Bertha Mary Ann Matuschka in New Zealand, with whom he had four children. In 1904 he became a produce and fuel merchant, later establishing John Ness, Son & Co. From 1909 to 1934 he was president of the Dulwich Hill School of Arts, and he served from 1908 to 1922 on Marrickville Council (mayor 1915–17, 1918–19). In 1922, he was elected to the New South Wales Legislative Assembly as a Nationalist member for Western Suburbs; with the reintroduction of single-member districts in 1927 he was elected to represent Dulwich Hill. Defeated in 1930, he was re-elected in 1932 as a United Australia Party candidate. Ness served until 1938; he died at Dulwich Hill in 1947.

New South Wales Legislative Assembly
Preceded by Sydney Shillington	Member for Western Suburbs; 1922–1927	Succeeded by Seat abolished
Preceded by New seat	Member for Dulwich Hill; 1927–1930	Succeeded by Frank Connors
Preceded by Frank Connors	Member for Dulwich Hill; 1932–1938	Succeeded by Guy Arkins
