= Electoral results for the district of Ashfield =

Election results for Ashfield, New South Wales, Australia

Ashfield, an electoral district of the Legislative Assembly in the Australian state of New South Wales, had three incarnations, the first from 1894 to 1920, the second from 1927 to 1959 and the third from 1968 to 1999.

Election	Member	Party
1894	Thomas Bavister	Free Trade
1895	Thomas Bavister	Free Trade
1898	Bernhard Wise	Protectionist
1899 by	Bernhard Wise	Protectionist
1900 by	Frederick Winchcombe	Free Trade
1901	Frederick Winchcombe	Liberal Reform
1904	Frederick Winchcombe	Liberal Reform
1905 by	William Robson	Liberal Reform
1907	William Robson	Liberal Reform
1910	William Robson	Liberal Reform
1913	William Robson	Liberal Reform
1917	William Robson	Nationalist
Election	Member	Party
1927	Milton Jarvie	Nationalist
1929 by	Milton Jarvie	Nationalist
1930	Milton Jarvie	Nationalist
1932	Milton Jarvie	United Australia / Independent
1935	Athol Richardson	United Australia
1938	Athol Richardson	United Australia
1941	Athol Richardson	United Australia
1944	Athol Richardson	Democratic
1946 by	Athol Richardson	Liberal
1947	Athol Richardson	Liberal
1950	Athol Richardson	Liberal
1952 by	Jack Richardson	Labor
1953	Richard Murden	Liberal
1956	Richard Murden	Liberal
Election	Member	Party
1968	David Hunter	Liberal
1971	David Hunter	Liberal
1973	David Hunter	Liberal
1976	Paul Whelan	Labor
1978	Paul Whelan	Labor
1981	Paul Whelan	Labor
1984	Paul Whelan	Labor
1988	Paul Whelan	Labor
1991	Paul Whelan	Labor
1995	Paul Whelan	Labor

== Election results ==
=== Elections in the 1990s ===
==== 1995 ====
1995 New South Wales state election: Ashfield
Party	Candidate	Votes	%	±%
Labor	Paul Whelan	13,902	43.8	−5.4
Liberal	Morris Mansour	7,836	24.7	−8.5
No Aircraft Noise	Michelle Calvert	6,269	19.8	+19.8
Greens	Paul Fitzgerald	2,043	6.4	+6.4
Democrats	John Collins	1,202	3.8	−3.9
Call to Australia	Clay Wilson	482	1.5	−0.2
Total formal votes		31,734	93.5	+8.1
Informal votes		2,222	6.5	−8.1
Turnout		33,956	91.4	
Two-party-preferred result
Labor	Paul Whelan	18,561	65.2	+5.4
Liberal	Morris Mansour	9,895	34.8	−5.4
Labor hold		Swing	+5.4	

==== 1991 ====
1991 New South Wales state election: Ashfield
Party	Candidate	Votes	%	±%
Labor	Paul Whelan	13,853	49.2	+6.2
Liberal	Ralph Buono	9,347	33.2	−1.1
Democrats	Robert Dawson	2,177	7.7	+3.7
Independent	Paul Wakim	1,594	5.7	+5.7
Independent	Ron Poulsen	708	2.5	+2.5
Call to Australia	Clay Wilson	497	1.8	+1.8
Total formal votes		28,176	85.4	−9.1
Informal votes		4,819	14.6	+9.1
Turnout		32,995	90.3	
Two-party-preferred result
Labor	Paul Whelan	15,733	59.9	+4.1
Liberal	Ralph Buono	10,554	40.1	−4.1
Labor hold		Swing	+4.1	

=== Elections in the 1980s ===
==== 1988 ====
1988 New South Wales state election: Ashfield
Party	Candidate	Votes	%	±%
Labor	Paul Whelan	11,690	41.9	−16.7
Liberal	Kevin O'Reilly	10,988	39.4	−1.7
Independent	Anne Leembruggen	2,730	9.8	+9.8
Independent EFF	John Shanahan	1,249	4.5	+4.5
Democrats	Peter Hennessy	632	2.3	+2.0
Independent	Sheena Hendley	583	2.1	+2.1
Total formal votes		27,872	94.9	−1.0
Informal votes		1,494	5.1	+1.0
Turnout		29,366	90.5	
Two-party-preferred result
Labor	Paul Whelan	13,225	51.2	−7.6
Liberal	Kevin O'Reilly	12,610	48.8	+7.6
Labor hold		Swing	−7.6	

==== 1984 ====
1984 New South Wales state election: Ashfield
Party	Candidate	Votes	%	±%
Labor	Paul Whelan	16,290	59.9	−5.6
Liberal	Geoffrey Howe	10,891	40.1	+9.8
Total formal votes		27,181	95.7	+0.5
Informal votes		1,232	4.3	−0.5
Turnout		28,413	90.4	+2.3
Labor hold		Swing	−8.3	

==== 1981 ====
1981 New South Wales state election: Ashfield
Party	Candidate	Votes	%	±%
Labor	Paul Whelan	17,449	65.5	−2.7
Liberal	George Dryden	8,078	30.3	−1.6
Democrats	Albert Jarman	1,095	4.1	+4.1
Total formal votes		26,622	95.2	
Informal votes		1,338	4.8	
Turnout		27,960	88.1	
Two-party-preferred result
Labor	Paul Whelan	17,559	68.2	+0.1
Liberal	George Dryden	8,178	31.8	−0.1
Labor hold		Swing	+0.1	

=== Elections in the 1970s ===
==== 1978 ====
1978 New South Wales state election: Ashfield
Party	Candidate	Votes	%	±%
Labor	Paul Whelan	19,814	68.1	+14.6
Liberal	Arthur McDonald	9,279	31.9	−11.9
Total formal votes		29,093	96.3	−1.7
Informal votes		1,130	3.7	+1.7
Turnout		30,223	90.5	−1.1
Labor hold		Swing	+13.0	

==== 1976 ====
1976 New South Wales state election: Ashfield
Party	Candidate	Votes	%	±%
Labor	Paul Whelan	16,111	53.5	+11.4
Liberal	Alwyn Innes	13,189	43.8	−3.6
Independent	Warren Wilson	443	1.5	+1.5
Australia	Clifford Bros	373	1.2	−4.4
Total formal votes		30,116	98.0	+1.5
Informal votes		606	2.0	−1.5
Turnout		30,722	91.6	+0.9
Two-party-preferred result
Labor	Paul Whelan	16,594	55.1	+8.7
Liberal	Alwyn Innes	13,522	44.9	−8.7
Labor gain from Liberal		Swing	+8.7	

==== 1973 ====
1973 New South Wales state election: Ashfield
Party	Candidate	Votes	%	±%
Liberal	David Hunter	13,077	47.4	+2.5
Labor	Bede Spillane	11,625	42.1	−1.4
Australia	John Jordan	1,531	5.6	+0.1
Democratic Labor	Mary Burton	1,377	5.0	−1.1
Total formal votes		27,610	96.5	
Informal votes		993	3.5	
Turnout		28,603	90.7	
Two-party-preferred result
Liberal	David Hunter	14,810	53.6	+1.5
Labor	Bede Spillane	12,800	46.4	−1.5
Liberal hold		Swing	+1.5	

==== 1971 ====
1971 New South Wales state election: Ashfield
Party	Candidate	Votes	%	±%
Liberal	David Hunter	10,618	44.9	−12.0
Labor	Bede Spillane	10,301	43.5	+0.4
Democratic Labor	Joseph Conroy	1,443	6.1	+6.1
Australia	David Eden	1,309	5.5	+5.5
Total formal votes		23,671	96.0	
Informal votes		990	4.0	
Turnout		24,661	90.7	
Two-party-preferred result
Liberal	David Hunter	12,316	52.0	−4.9
Labor	Bede Spillane	11,355	48.0	+4.9
Liberal hold		Swing	−4.9	

=== Elections in the 1960s ===
==== 1968 ====
1968 New South Wales state election: Ashfield
Party	Candidate	Votes	%	±%
Liberal	David Hunter	13,838	56.9	−1.0
Labor	Charles Maddocks	10,481	43.1	+1.0
Total formal votes		24,319	96.6	
Informal votes		848	3.4	
Turnout		25,167	92.5	
Liberal win		(new seat)		

==== 1959 - 1968 ====
District abolished

=== Elections in the 1950s ===
==== 1956 ====
1956 New South Wales state election: Ashfield
Party	Candidate	Votes	%	±%
Liberal	Richard Murden	12,134	60.3	+10.0
Labor	James Brady	7,985	39.7	−10.0
Total formal votes		20,119	98.8	+0.4
Informal votes		253	1.2	−0.4
Turnout		20,372	94.1	−0.6
Liberal hold		Swing	+10.0	

==== 1953 ====
1953 New South Wales state election: Ashfield
Party	Candidate	Votes	%	±%
Liberal	Richard Murden	10,753	50.3	
Labor	Jack Richardson	10,631	49.7	
Total formal votes		21,384	98.4	
Informal votes		354	1.6	
Turnout		21,738	94.7	
Liberal hold		Swing		

Athol Richardson (Liberal) had held the seat at the 1950 election, however he was appointed to the Supreme Court and Jack Richardson (Labor) won the seat at the 1952 by-election.

==== 1952 by-election ====
1952 Ashfield by-election Saturday 28 June
Party	Candidate	Votes	%	±%
Labor	Jack Richardson	10,566	52.1	+10.3
Liberal	Ray Watson	9,697	47.9	−10.3
Total formal votes		20,263	98.5	−0.3
Informal votes		308	1.5	+0.3
Turnout		20,571	90.8	−2.5
Labor gain from Liberal		Swing	+10.3	

The retiring member Athol Richardson (Liberal) had been appointed as a Judge of the Supreme Court, and was not related to Jack Richardson (Labor) who capitalised on their surnames, campaigning on the slogan “Judge Richardson on his merits”.

==== 1950 ====
1950 New South Wales state election: Ashfield
Party	Candidate	Votes	%	±%
Liberal	Athol Richardson	13,296	58.2	
Labor	Ernest Grove	9,559	41.8	
Total formal votes		22,855	98.8	
Informal votes		285	1.2	
Turnout		23,140	93.3	
Liberal hold		Swing		

=== Elections in the 1940s ===
==== 1947 ====
1947 New South Wales state election: Ashfield
Party	Candidate	Votes	%	±%
Liberal	Athol Richardson	12,996	58.2	+4.8
Labor	William Peters	9,332	41.8	−4.8
Total formal votes		22,328	98.7	+1.9
Informal votes		284	1.3	−1.9
Turnout		22,612	96.1	+2.3
Liberal hold		Swing	+4.8	

==== 1946 by-election ====
1946 Ashfield by-election Saturday 9 November
Party	Candidate	Votes	%	±%
Liberal	Athol Richardson (re-elected)	12,036	56.5	+3.1
Labor	William Peters	9,265	43.5	−3.1
Total formal votes		21,301	98.9	+2.1
Informal votes		231	1.1	−2.1
Turnout		21,532	87.6	−6.2
Liberal hold		Swing	+3.1	

Athol Richardson (Liberal) had resigned to contest the federal seat of Parkes at the 1946 election. When he was unsuccessful he then re-contested Ashfield.

==== 1944 ====
1944 New South Wales state election: Ashfield
Party	Candidate	Votes	%	±%
Democratic	Athol Richardson	11,240	53.4	−5.2
Labor	William Bodkin	9,791	46.6	+5.2
Total formal votes		21,031	96.8	−1.2
Informal votes		688	3.2	+1.2
Turnout		21,719	93.8	+0.7
Democratic hold		Swing	−5.2	

==== 1941 ====
1941 New South Wales state election: Ashfield
Party	Candidate	Votes	%	±%
United Australia	Athol Richardson	11,555	58.5	
Labor	Rex Jones	8,179	41.5	
Total formal votes		19,734	98.1	
Informal votes		389	1.9	
Turnout		20,123	93.1	
United Australia hold		Swing		

=== Elections in the 1930s ===
==== 1938 ====
1938 New South Wales state election: Ashfield
Party	Candidate	Votes	%	±%
United Australia	Athol Richardson	8,921	53.7	+0.9
Independent	Thomas Cavill	7,692	46.3	+46.3
Total formal votes		16,613	97.1	−1.4
Informal votes		498	2.9	+1.4
Turnout		17,111	95.7	−1.0
United Australia hold		Swing	N/A	

==== 1935 ====
1935 New South Wales state election: Ashfield
Party	Candidate	Votes	%	±%
United Australia	Athol Richardson	8,511	52.8	−19.5
Labor (NSW)	Robert Bruce	4,425	27.5	−0.2
Ind. United Australia	Milton Jarvie (defeated)	3,177	19.7	+19.7
Total formal votes		16,113	98.5	+0.2
Informal votes		247	1.5	−0.2
Turnout		16,360	96.7	+0.3
United Australia hold		Swing	N/A	

- Preferences were not distributed.

==== 1932 ====
1932 New South Wales state election: Ashfield
Party	Candidate	Votes	%	±%
United Australia	Milton Jarvie	11,658	72.3	+29.3
Labor (NSW)	Lancelot Stevenson	4,456	27.7	−10.1
Total formal votes		16,114	98.3	0.0
Informal votes		279	1.7	0.0
Turnout		16,393	96.4	−2.5
United Australia hold		Swing	+17.5	

==== 1930 ====
1930 New South Wales state election: Ashfield
Party	Candidate	Votes	%	±%
Nationalist	Milton Jarvie	6,736	43.0	−15.2
Labor	Alfred Paddison	5,927	37.8	+11.9
Independent	Alexander Huie	1,616	10.3	−5.6
Australian	George Treloar	1,388	8.9	
Total formal votes		15,667	98.3	−0.9
Informal votes		276	1.7	+0.9
Turnout		15,943	93.9	+8.2
Two-party-preferred result
Nationalist	Milton Jarvie	8,592	54.8	
Labor	Alfred Paddison	7,075	45.2	
Nationalist hold		Swing	N/A	

=== Elections in the 1920s ===
==== 1929 by-election ====
1929 Ashfield by-election Saturday 5 October
Party	Candidate	Votes	%	±%
Labor	John Clancy	3,526	38.4	+12.5
Nationalist	Milton Jarvie	3,484	38.0	−20.2
Independent	Alexander Huie	1,692	18.5	+2.6
Nationalist	Reginald Kirkwood	281	3.1	+3.1
Nationalist	Albert Pikett	190	2.1	+2.1
Total formal votes		9,173	99.0	−0.2
Informal votes		95	1.0	+0.2
Turnout		9,268	71.9	−13.9
Two-party-preferred result
Nationalist	Milton Jarvie (re-elected)	4,376	51.5	
Labor	John Clancy	4,128	48.5	
Nationalist hold		Swing	N/A	

A Royal Commission reported that Jarvie had attempted to bribe the Chief Secretary, however in the following month he was found not guilty of criminal charges. Jarvie subsequently chose to resign and re-contest the seat.

==== 1927 ====
1927 New South Wales state election: Ashfield
Party	Candidate	Votes	%	±%
Nationalist	Milton Jarvie	6,537	58.2	
Labor	Walter Sparrow	2,904	25.9	
Independent	Alexander Huie	1,787	15.9	
Total formal votes		11,228	99.2	
Informal votes		90	0.8	
Turnout		11,318	85.7	
Nationalist win		(new seat)		

==== 1920 - 1927 ====
District abolished

=== Elections in the 1910s ===
==== 1917 ====
1917 New South Wales state election: Ashfield
Party	Candidate	Votes	%	±%
Nationalist	William Robson	6,697	76.4	+5.9
Labor	George Boland	2,063	23.6	−3.1
Total formal votes		8,760	99.0	+1.7
Informal votes		87	1.0	−1.7
Turnout		8,847	58.3	−6.4
Nationalist hold		Swing	+5.9	

==== 1913 ====
1913 New South Wales state election: Ashfield
Party	Candidate	Votes	%	±%
Liberal Reform	William Robson	5,954	70.5	
Labor	Percy Evans	2,251	26.7	
Independent	Henry Johnson	242	2.9	
Total formal votes		8,447	97.3	
Informal votes		231	2.7	
Turnout		8,678	64.7	
Liberal Reform hold				

==== 1910 ====
1910 New South Wales state election: Ashfield
Party	Candidate	Votes	%	±%
Liberal Reform	William Robson	5,800	66.3	
Labour	George Davidson	2,943	33.7	
Total formal votes		8,743	98.6	
Informal votes		128	1.4	
Turnout		8,871	71.8	
Liberal Reform hold				

=== Elections in the 1900s ===
==== 1907 ====
1907 New South Wales state election: Ashfield
Party	Candidate	Votes	%	±%
Liberal Reform	William Robson	4,267	67.6	
Independent	James Eve	2,047	32.4	
Total formal votes		6,314	97.9	
Informal votes		136	2.1	
Turnout		6,450	66.7	
Liberal Reform hold				

==== 1905 by-election ====
1905 Ashfield by-election Wednesday 16 August
Party	Candidate	Votes	%	±%
Liberal Reform	William Robson	2,259	60.3	−25.5
Independent	Alexander Miller	843	22.5	
Labor	Thomas Lumley	642	17.2	+3.0
Total formal votes		3,744	99.3	+0.7
Informal votes		28	0.7	−0.7
Turnout		3,772	46.1 (Note: Estimate based on a roll of 8,191 at the 1904 election.)	−3.5
Liberal Reform hold		Swing		

Frederick Winchcombe (Liberal Reform) resigned.

==== 1904 ====
1904 New South Wales state election: Ashfield
Party	Candidate	Votes	%	±%
Liberal Reform	Frederick Winchcombe	3,434	85.8	
Labour	Lionel Cahill	570	14.2	
Total formal votes		4,004	98.6	
Informal votes		55	1.4	
Turnout		4,059	49.6	
Liberal Reform hold				

Ashfield lost part of the district to Burwood and was expanded to include part of Petersham. Frederick Winchcombe (Liberal Reform) was the member for Ashfield. The member for Petersham was John Cohen (Liberal Reform) who successfully contested that electorate.

==== 1901 ====
1901 New South Wales state election: Ashfield
Party	Candidate	Votes	%	±%
Liberal Reform	Frederick Winchcombe	unopposed		
Liberal Reform gain from Progressive				

Bernhard Wise (Protectionist) had won the seat at the 1898 election, however he was appointed to the Legislative Council and Frederick Winchcombe (Liberal Reform) won the seat at the November 1900 by-election.

==== 1900 by-election ====
1900 Ashfield by-election Saturday 10 November
Party	Candidate	Votes	%	±%
Free Trade	Frederick Winchcombe	968	60.4	+10.5
Protectionist	John Watkin	634	39.6	−10.5
Total formal votes		1,602	100.0	+0.4
Informal votes		0	0.0	−0.4
Turnout		1,602	45.5 (Note: Estimate based on a roll of 3,234 at the 1899 by-election.)	−20.4
Free Trade gain from Protectionist		Swing	+10.5	

Bernhard Wise (Protectionist) was appointed to the Legislative Council.

=== Elections in the 1890s ===
==== 1899 by-election ====
1899 Ashfield by-election Tuesday 26 September
Party	Candidate	Votes	%	±%
Protectionist	Bernhard Wise (re-elected)	831	50.6	+0.5
Free Trade	Thomas Bavister	810	49.4	−0.5
Total formal votes		1,641	99.5	−0.1
Informal votes		8	0.5	+0.1
Turnout		1,649	51.0	−14.9
Protectionist hold		Swing	+0.5	

Bernhard Wise (Protectionist) had been appointed Attorney General.

==== 1898 ====
1898 New South Wales colonial election: Ashfield
Party	Candidate	Votes	%	±%
National Federal	Bernhard Wise	966	50.1	
Free Trade	Thomas Bavister	961	49.9	
Total formal votes		1,927	99.6	
Informal votes		7	0.4	
Turnout		1,934	65.9	
National Federal gain from Free Trade				

==== 1895 ====
1895 New South Wales colonial election: Ashfield
Party	Candidate	Votes	%	±%
Free Trade	Thomas Bavister	883	55.2	
Independent	John Goodlet	718	44.9	
Total formal votes		1,601	99.5	
Informal votes		8	0.5	
Turnout		1,609	68.5	
Free Trade hold				

==== 1894 ====
1894 New South Wales colonial election: Ashfield
Party	Candidate	Votes	%	±%
Free Trade	Thomas Bavister	1,000	51.4	
Independent	Mark Hammond	867	44.6	
Labour	Robert Thomson	64	3.3	
Ind. Free Trade	Thomas Evans	13	0.7	
Total formal votes		1,944	99.1	
Informal votes		17	0.9	
Turnout		1,961	82.1	
Free Trade win		(new seat)		
