= List of people from the greater Ashfield area =

This is a list of notable residents or former residents of the greater Ashfield area in Australia, covering the suburbs of the Inner West Council in Inner West of Sydney, including Ashfield, Croydon, Haberfield, and Summer Hill.

== Arts ==
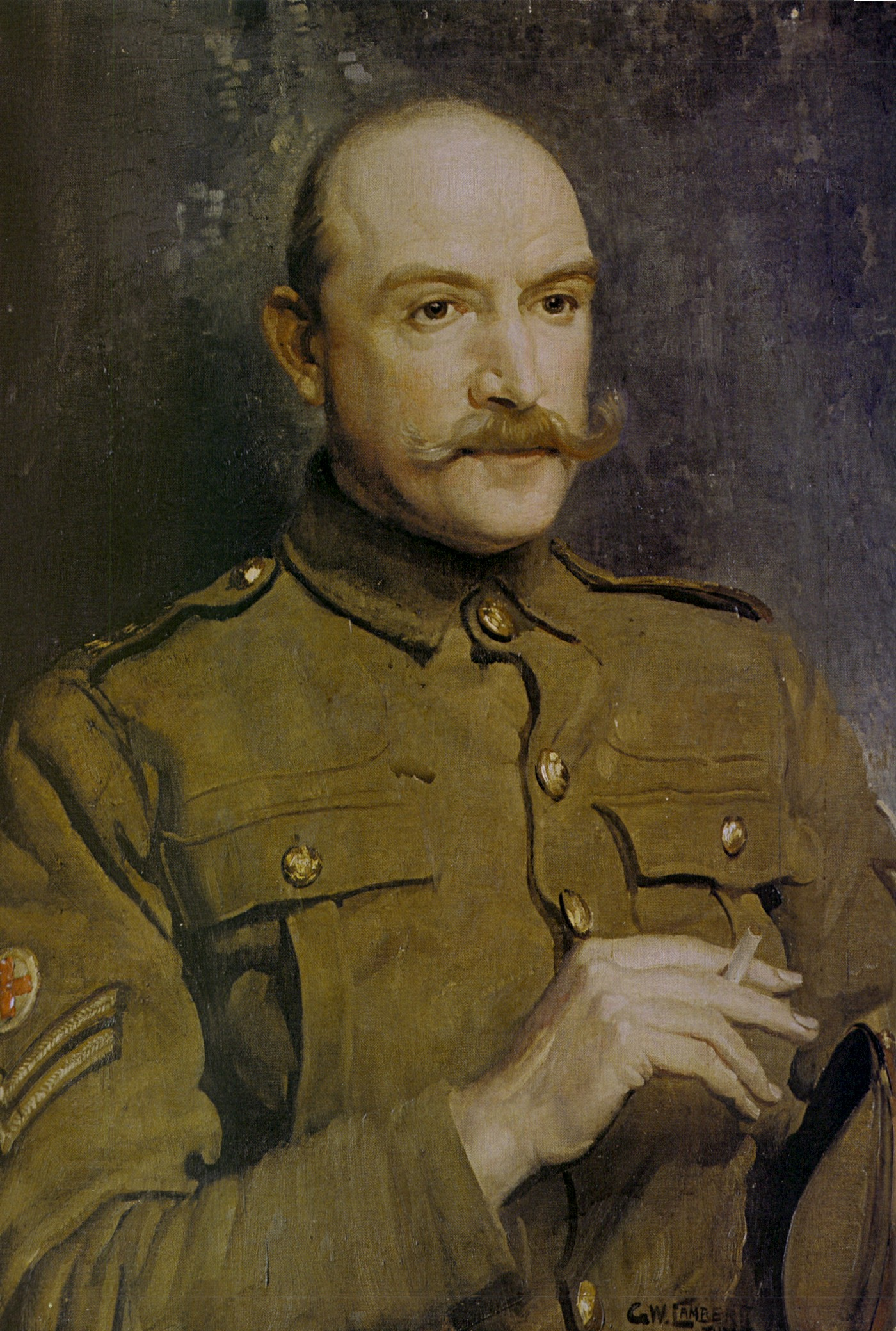
Arthur Streeton

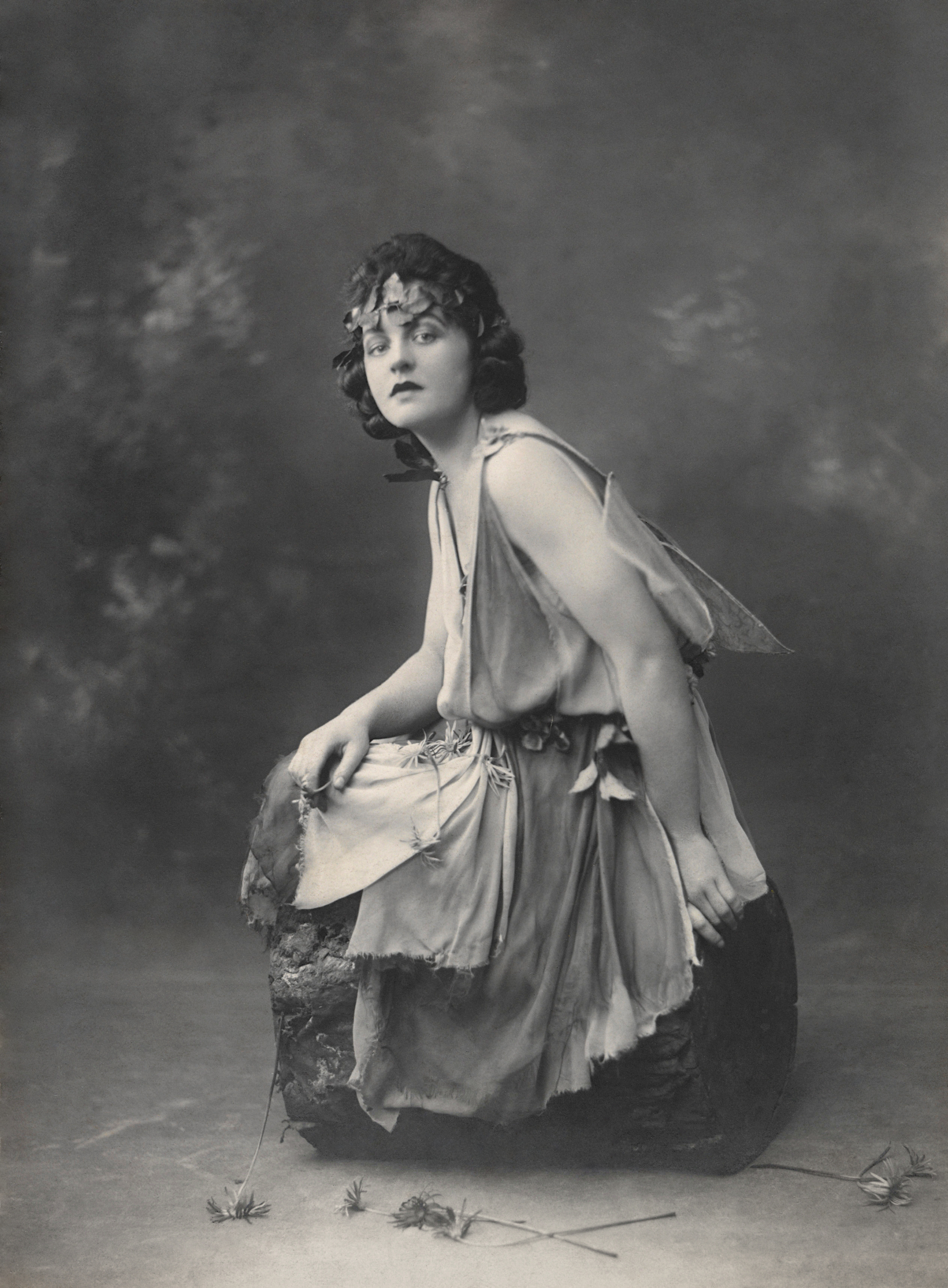
Pamela Travers

- James Muir Auld (1879–1942): Ashfield-born artist; winner of the 1935 Wynne Prize
- Normand Henry Baker (1908–1955): Archibald Prize-winning artist who was born in Summer Hill
- Geraldine Brooks (born 1955): Pulitzer Prize-winning author (for March); wrote about her childhood in Ashfield in the book Foreign Correspondence
- Henry Halloran (1811–1893): poet and resident of Ashfield; buried in St John's cemetery
- Robert McAnally (1882–1956): composer and conductor
- Adam Phillips (born 1971): award-winning animator and artist who utilizes Adobe Flash; worked with Disney during the 1990s
- Robie Porter (Rob EG) (born 1942): musician and record label owner
- Arthur Streeton (1867–1943): artist who briefly lived in Summer Hill
- Rod Taylor (1930–2015): Hollywood movie star
- P. L. Travers (1899–1996): author of five volumes of Mary Poppins stories; boarded at Normanhurst School in Ashfield beginning in 1912 and later lived with her mother and younger sisters at 17 Pembroke Street

== Business ==
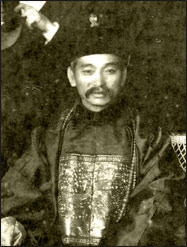
Quong Tart

- John Goodlet (1835–1914): timber merchant and philanthropist who established the Goodlet Institute in Ashfield
- Mei Quong Tart (1850–1903): prominent Sydney businessman, tea house owner and acting consul to Imperial Chinese government in late 19th century; lived in Gallop House at 48 Arthur Street

== Law ==
- Norman Allan (1901–1977): NSW police commissioner in 1962–72; was a resident of Haberfield
- Justice Greg James (born 1944): former NSW Supreme Court judge, current president of Mental Health Review Tribunal of New South Wales and resident of Summer Hill
- Ian Temby, KC (born 1942): first commissioner of the Independent Commission Against Corruption of New South Wales; former resident of Summer Hill
- Rt Hon Sir Cyril Walsh (1909–1973): justice of the High Court of Australia and resident of Summer Hill

== Military ==
- Colonel Matron Kathleen Best (1910–1957): nurse and first director of the Women's Royal Australian Army Corps
- Alick James Bryant (1903–1985), also known as James John Bryant: believed to have been the youngest Australian soldier to serve during the First World War
- Pat Hughes (1917–1940): air force officer who shot down more German planes during the Battle of Britain than any other Australian
- John Paton (1834–1914): Scottish-born soldier awarded the Victoria Cross for gallantry at the Siege of Lucknow in India; retired to Summer Hill; a park on the corner of Smith and Henson Streets in Summer Hill is named after him
- Major General Gustave Ramaciotti (1862–1927): owned the Theatre Royal property by the corners of King and Castlereagh Streets; base commander during World War 1, from 1915 to 1917; retired in 1917 and was appointed C.M.G.

== Pioneers ==
- Augustus Alt (1731–1815): first surveyor-general of New South Wales; arrived with the First Fleet in 1788 and was granted a substantial parcel of land in northern Ashfield
- Robert Campbell (1769–1846): early settler responsible for giving Ashfield its name
- Elizabeth Underwood (ca. 1794–1858): early landowner of Ashfield Park estate who subdivided it to form the village of Ashfield in 1838

== Politics ==
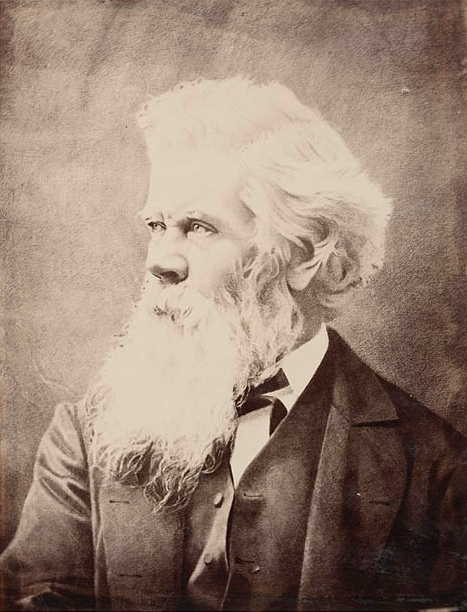
Henry Parkes

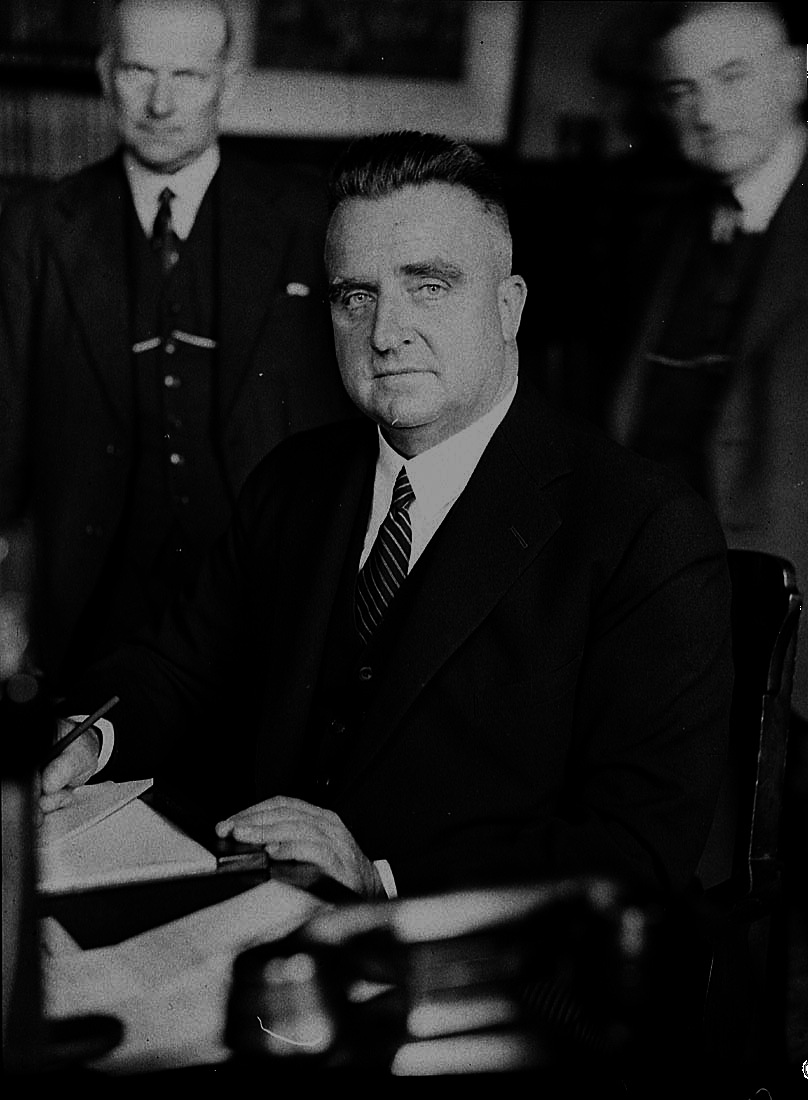
Bertram Stevens

- Joseph Abbott (1843–1903): wool-broker and politician
- Michael Fitzpatrick (1816–1881): public servant, land agent and politician
- Mark Hammond (1844–1908): gold miner, mayor of Ashfield and member of the NSW Parliament
- Ninian Melville (1843–1897): well-known Sydney furniture maker and mortician who subsequently became the mayor of Ashfield, and a parliamentarian
- William John Miles (1871–1942): accountant, businessman and far-right political activist
- Richard Murden (1906–1997): Haberfield furniture salesman, twice elected mayor of Ashfield and also elected to the NSW Parliament
- Sir Henry Parkes (1815–1896): former NSW premier, lived in Ashfield during the 1870s
- Herbert Pratten (1865–1928): jam maker and politician, was mayor of Ashfield and later Federal Minister for Trade and Customs from 1923 to 1928; Pratten Park named in his honour
- Murray Robson (1906–1974): soldier awarded the DSO in WWII and NSW opposition leader from 1954 to 1955; his father, William Robson (1869–1951), was also a member of parliament and mayor of Ashfield
- Sir Bertram Stevens (1889–1973): premier of New South Wales from 1932 to 1939
- Paul Whelan (born 1943): mayor of Ashfield from 1972 to 1976 and Minister for Police in the Carr government from 1995 to 2001

Also see List of mayors at the end of the page.

== Science ==
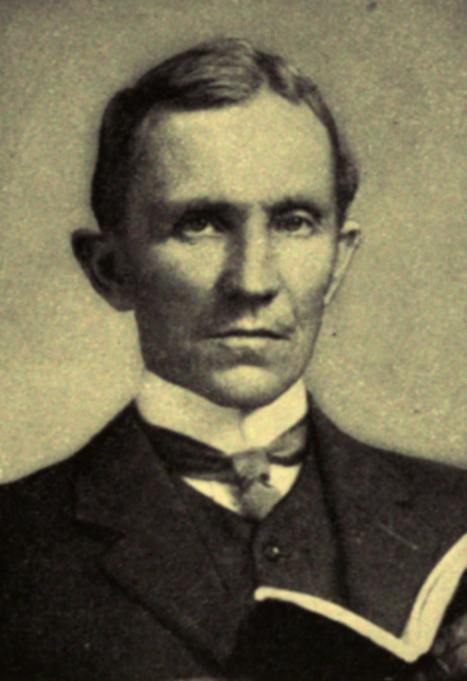
Edgeworth David

- Richard Baker (1854–1941): curator/director of the Technological Museum in Ultimo (now known as the Powerhouse Museum); lived in Ashfield for 30 years in a house named "Eudesmia", which still stands; proponent of decorative use of the Waratah in logos and symbols
- Dr John Belisario (1820–1900): dentist at the end of the 19th century; recorded as living in Summer Hill in the 1891 census; first dentist in Australia to administer ether to a patient to carry out dental work
- Professor Edgeworth David (1858–1934): noted geologist and Antarctic explorer
- Walter Wilson Froggatt (1858–1937): entomologist, founder of the Naturalists' Society of New South Wales and author; Froggatt Crescent in Croydon, and the Froggatt prize for Science at the Presbyterian Ladies' College, Sydney are named after him
- Ian Clunies Ross (1899–1959): veterinary scientist and founder of the CSIRO; for a while was commemorated on the Australian $50 note

== Sport ==
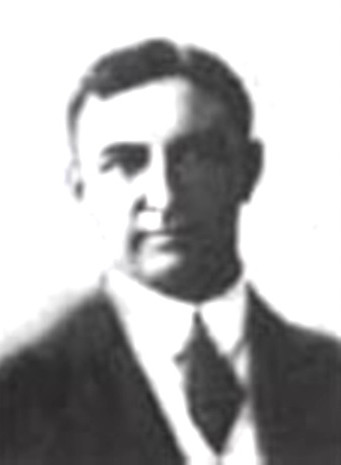
Stan Rowley

- Daphne Akhurst (1903–1933): five times Australian Open tennis champion; educated at Normanhurst School in Ashfield and Sydney Conservatorium of Music
- Kevin Berry (1945–2006): swimmer who won gold in the 200m butterfly at the 1964 Summer Olympics; resident of Summer Hill
- Stan Rowley (1876–1924): Olympic athlete who won three individual bronze medals (60m, 100m, 200m) at the Paris Olympics in 1900; won a gold medal as part of the British cross-country team

== Other ==
- Margaret Chandler (1934–1963): one of the two victims who died under mysterious circumstances in the well-publicised Bogle-Chandler case; lived in Croydon with her husband Geoffrey
- Reverend Bill Crews (born 1944): as minister of Ashfield Uniting Church, created the Exodus Foundation to assist homeless and abandoned youth
- David Elphinstone (1847–1916): prominent architect and builder, resident of Summer Hill
- Edwin Johnson (1835–1894): education reformer, undersecretary to the Department of Public Instruction
- Bea Miles (1902–1973): eccentric Sydneysider, born in Ashfield but spent much of her later life living on the street and whose life was the inspiration for the book and movie Lilian's Story
- Louise Taplin (1855–1901): matron, until her death, of The Infants' Home in Ashfield; led the home through the 1890s depression

== Mayors of Ashfield ==
#	Mayor	Party	Term start	Term end	Notes
1	John Pope		1872	1873	
2	Daniel Holborow		1874	1880	
3	Thomas Nicholson		1881	1881	
4	Mark Hammond		1882	1884	
5	John Watkin		1884	1884	
1 (2nd term)	John Pope		1885	1885	
6	Joseph Mortley		1886	1887	
7	Joseph Watkin		1888	1888	
8	Thomas Dean		1888	1888	
9	Robert Dougan		1889	1890	
10	Albert Brown		1891	1892	
11	Richard Stanton		1893	7 March 1895	
12	Ninian Melville	Protectionist	8 March 1895	23 February 1896	
13	John Upward		24 February 1896	1897	
14	Francis Josephson		1898	1898	
15	William Robson	Free Trade	1899	1899	
16	John Mills		1900	1900	
17	Ernest Broughton	Liberal Reform	1901	1902	
18	Arthur Miller	Liberal Reform	1903	1905	
11 (2nd term)	Richard Stanton		1906	1906	
19	Charles Websdale		1907	1907	
20	George Brown		1908	1908	
21	Herbert Pratten	Liberal Reform	1909	1911	
22	Alfred Crane	Liberal Reform	1911	1912	
23	Charles Algie		1913	1914	
24	John Hammond		1915	1917	
25	John Yeo		1917	1919	
26	Frank Hedger	Nationalist	1919	1920	
27	George Watson	Nationalist	1920	1922	
24 (2nd term)	John Hammond		1922	1923	
28	D McDonald	Nationalist	1923	1925	
26 (2nd term)	Frank Hedger	Nationalist	1925	1929	
29	Henry Gough	Nationalist	1929	1932	
30	John Lapish	United Australia	1932	1933	
31	William Grainger	United Australia	1933	1935	
32	Thomas Cavill	United Australia	1935	1938	
33	Edward Allman	United Australia	1938	1943	
34	J Lindsay		1943	1944	
32 (2nd term)	Thomas Cavill	Liberal	1944	1946	
35	Ralph Tetley	Liberal	1946	1948	
36	Thomas Marshall	Independent	1948	1950	
37	Richard Murden	Liberal	1950	1952	
38	Herbert Bailey	Liberal	1952	1954	
39	James Blackwood		1954	1957	
40	Charles Bullivant		1957	1959	
41	Darrell Jackson		1959	1962	
42	William Peters	Labor	1962	1964	
43	Bede Spillane	Labor	1964	1965	
44	Allan Crawford		1965	1967	
37 (2nd term)	Richard Murden	Liberal	December 1967	September 1972	
45	Paul Whelan	Labor	September 1972	September 1976	
46	Lew Herman	Labor	September 1976	September 1991	
47	Dr John Ward	Independent	September 1991	September 1995	
46 (2nd term)	Lew Herman	Labor	September 1995	September 1996	
48	Vincent Sicari	No Aircraft Noise	September 1996	September 1997	
49	Mark Bonanno	Labor	September 1997	March 2004	
50	Rae Desmond Jones	Labor	March 2004	September 2006	
51	Ted Cassidy	Independent	September 2006	September 2011	
52	Lyall Kennedy	Greens	September 2011	September 2012	
53	Morris Mansour	Independent	September 2012	September 2013	
54	Lucille McKenna	Labor	September 2013	12 May 2016	
