= Results of the 1953 New South Wales state election =

State election for New South Wales, Australia in February 1953

New South Wales state election, 14 February 1953 Legislative Assembly << 1950–1956 >>
Enrolled voters	1,953,953 (Note: There were 1,692,231 enrolled voters in 81 contested electorates and 261,722 were enrolled in 13 uncontested electorates (9 Labor, 3 Liberal and 1 Country ).)				
Votes cast	1,548,877		Turnout	93.86	+1.11
Informal votes	39,416		Informal	2.48	+0.71
Summary of votes by party
Party	Primary votes	%	Swing	Seats	Change
Labor	852,276	55.03	+8.28	57	+11
Liberal	432,739	27.94	−9.57	22	−7
Country	179,680	11.60	+2.63	14	−3
Independent	38,822	2.51	+0.20	0	−
Communist	21,421	1.38	+0.54	0	−
Independent Labor	16,533	1.07	−0.58	1	− 1
Lang Labor	7,046	0.48	−0.74	0	−
Total	1,588,293			94	

This is a list of electoral district results for the 1953 New South Wales state election.

== Results by electoral district ==
=== Albury ===
1953 New South Wales state election: Albury
Party	Candidate	Votes	%	±%
Liberal	Doug Padman	9,644	51.8	
Labor	Frank Finnan	8,988	48.2	
Total formal votes		18,632	98.9	
Informal votes		208	1.1	
Turnout		18,840	93.9	
Liberal hold		Swing		

=== Armidale ===
1953 New South Wales state election: Armidale
Party	Candidate	Votes	%	±%
Labor	Jim Cahill	8,595	50.04	
Country	Davis Hughes	8,582	49.96	
Total formal votes		17,177	98.6	
Informal votes		240	1.4	
Turnout		17,417	95.1	
Labor gain from Country		Swing		

=== Ashfield ===
1953 New South Wales state election: Ashfield
Party	Candidate	Votes	%	±%
Liberal	Richard Murden	10,753	50.3	
Labor	Jack Richardson	10,631	49.7	
Total formal votes		21,384	98.4	
Informal votes		354	1.6	
Turnout		21,738	94.7	
Liberal hold		Swing		

Athol Richardson (Liberal) had held the seat at the 1950 election, however he was appointed to the Supreme Court and Jack Richardson (Labor) won the seat at the 1952 by-election.

=== Auburn ===
1953 New South Wales state election: Auburn
Party	Candidate	Votes	%	±%
Labor	Edgar Dring	12,095	62.0	
Lang Labor	Chris Lang	7,406	38.0	
Total formal votes		19,501	96.1	
Informal votes		786	3.9	
Turnout		20,287	94.4	
Labor hold		Swing		

=== Balmain ===
1953 New South Wales state election: Balmain
Party	Candidate	Votes	%	±%
Labor	John McMahon	17,887	79.1	
Independent	Arthur Doughty	3,267	14.5	
Communist	Stanley Moran	1,459	6.4	
Total formal votes		22,613	96.2	
Informal votes		892	3.8	
Turnout		23,505	92.9	
Two-candidate-preferred result
Labor	John McMahon	18,617	82.3	
Independent	Arthur Doughty	3,996	17.7	
Labor hold		Swing		

=== Bankstown ===
1953 New South Wales state election: Bankstown
Party	Candidate	Votes	%	±%
Labor	Spence Powell	16,726	89.4	
Communist	Claude Jones	1,981	10.6	
Total formal votes		18,707	92.5	
Informal votes		1,517	7.5	
Turnout		20,224	93.6	
Labor hold		Swing		

=== Barwon ===
1953 New South Wales state election: Barwon
Party	Candidate	Votes	%	±%
Country	Geoff Crawford	8,274	53.8	
Labor	Gerard McInerney	7,118	46.2	
Total formal votes		15,392	98.5	
Informal votes		234	1.5	
Turnout		15,626	93.0	
Country hold		Swing		

=== Bathurst ===
1953 New South Wales state election: Bathurst
Party	Candidate	Votes	%	±%
Labor	Gus Kelly	unopposed		
Labor hold				

=== Blacktown ===
1953 New South Wales state election: Blacktown
Party	Candidate	Votes	%	±%
Labor	John Freeman	14,424	61.2	
Liberal	George Walker	8,391	35.6	
Communist	Melville McCalman	756	3.2	
Total formal votes		23,571	98.0	
Informal votes		477	2.0	
Turnout		24,048	94.1	
Two-party-preferred result
Labor	John Freeman	15,088	64.0	
Liberal	George Walker	8,486	36.0	
Labor hold		Swing		

=== Bondi ===
1953 New South Wales state election: Bondi
Party	Candidate	Votes	%	±%
Labor	Abe Landa	12,904	59.6	
Liberal	Leslie Fingleton	8,757	40.4	
Total formal votes		21,661	98.0	
Informal votes		446	2.0	
Turnout		22,107	93.3	
Labor hold		Swing		

=== Bulli ===
1953 New South Wales state election: Bulli
Party	Candidate	Votes	%	±%
Labor	Laurie Kelly	14,480	87.9	
Communist	Sara Phipps	1,994	12.1	
Total formal votes		16,474	94.0	
Informal votes		1,054	6.0	
Turnout		17,528	94.3	
Labor hold		Swing		

=== Burrinjuck ===
1953 New South Wales state election: Burrinjuck
Party	Candidate	Votes	%	±%
Labor	Bill Sheahan	10,809	59.5	
Country	Robert Stewart	5,812	32.0	
Independent	Barney Morton	1,212	6.7	
Independent	John Cusack	337	1.9	
Total formal votes		18,170	98.9	
Informal votes		205	1.1	
Turnout		18,375	95.6	
Two-party-preferred result
Labor	Bill Sheahan	11,538	63.5	
Country	Robert Stewart	6,632	36.5	
Labor hold		Swing		

=== Burwood ===
1953 New South Wales state election: Burwood
Party	Candidate	Votes	%	±%
Liberal	Leslie Parr	12,411	57.1	
Labor	William Weiss	9,311	42.9	
Total formal votes		21,722	98.7	
Informal votes		278	1.3	
Turnout		22,000	93.2	
Liberal hold		Swing		

=== Byron ===
1953 New South Wales state election: Byron
Party	Candidate	Votes	%	±%
Country	Stanley Stephens	unopposed		
Country hold				

=== Canterbury ===
1953 New South Wales state election: Canterbury
Party	Candidate	Votes	%	±%
Labor	Arthur Tonge	14,025	66.5	
Liberal	Donald Arthur	6,146	29.1	
Communist	Roy Boyd	912	4.3	
Total formal votes		21,083	98.1	
Informal votes		418	1.9	
Turnout		21,501	94.0	
Two-party-preferred result
Labor	Arthur Tonge	14,758	70.0	
Liberal	Donald Arthur	6,325	30.0	
Labor hold		Swing		

=== Casino ===
1953 New South Wales state election: Casino
Party	Candidate	Votes	%	±%
Labor	William Young	5,199	36.7	
Country	Ian Robinson	4,547	32.1	
Country	John Reid	3,152	22.2	
Country	William Cooke	1,275	9.0	
Total formal votes		14,173	98.3	
Informal votes		249	1.7	
Turnout		14,422	94.0	
Two-party-preferred result
Country	Ian Robinson	8,560	60.4	
Labor	William Young	5,613	39.6	
Country hold		Swing		

=== Castlereagh ===
1953 New South Wales state election: Castlereagh
Party	Candidate	Votes	%	±%
Labor	Jack Renshaw	10,147	62.8	
Country	Keith Sullivan	6,023	37.2	
Total formal votes		16,170	98.7	
Informal votes		220	1.3	
Turnout		16,390	90.8	
Labor hold		Swing		

=== Cessnock ===
1953 New South Wales state election: Cessnock
Party	Candidate	Votes	%	±%
Labor	John Crook	15,145	85.6	
Communist	John Tapp	2,557	14.4	
Total formal votes		17,702	95.1	
Informal votes		908	4.9	
Turnout		18,610	94.7	
Labor hold		Swing		

=== Clarence ===
1953 New South Wales state election: Clarence
Party	Candidate	Votes	%	±%
Country	Cecil Wingfield	11,672	66.3	
Labor	George Russell	5,269	30.0	
Communist	Kenneth Harding	650	3.7	
Total formal votes		17,591	97.9	
Informal votes		378	2.1	
Turnout		17,969	95.2	
Two-party-preferred result
Country	Cecil Wingfield	11,962	68.0	
Labor	George Russell	5,629	32.0	
Country hold		Swing		

=== Cobar ===
1953 New South Wales state election: Cobar
Party	Candidate	Votes	%	±%
Labor	Ernest Wetherell	unopposed		
Labor hold				

=== Collaroy ===
1953 New South Wales state election: Collaroy
Party	Candidate	Votes	%	±%
Liberal	Robert Askin	12,722	63.3	
Labor	Evelyn Barron	7,360	36.7	
Total formal votes		20,082	98.0	
Informal votes		414	2.0	
Turnout		20,496	92.3	
Liberal hold		Swing		

=== Concord ===
1953 New South Wales state election: Concord
Party	Candidate	Votes	%	±%
Labor	Thomas Murphy	11,661	54.7	
Liberal	John Adamson	9,673	45.3	
Total formal votes		21,334	98.1	
Informal votes		421	1.9	
Turnout		21,755	94.3	
Labor gain from Liberal		Swing		

=== Coogee ===
1953 New South Wales state election: Coogee
Party	Candidate	Votes	%	±%
Labor	Lou Walsh	11,099	53.2	
Liberal	Kevin Ellis	9,776	46.8	
Total formal votes		20,875	98.2	
Informal votes		386	1.8	
Turnout		21,261	93.2	
Labor gain from Liberal		Swing		

=== Cook's River ===
1953 New South Wales state election: Cook's River
Party	Candidate	Votes	%	±%
Labor	Joseph Cahill	unopposed		
Labor hold				

=== Croydon ===
1953 New South Wales state election: Croydon
Party	Candidate	Votes	%	±%
Liberal	David Hunter	10,844	54.9	
Labor	Kenneth Guthrie	8,924	45.1	
Total formal votes		19,768	98.3	
Informal votes		337	1.7	
Turnout		20,105	93.7	
Liberal hold		Swing		

=== Drummoyne ===
1953 New South Wales state election: Drummoyne
Party	Candidate	Votes	%	±%
Labor	Roy Jackson	11,551	52.1	
Liberal	Robert Dewley	10,622	47.9	
Total formal votes		22,173	98.0	
Informal votes		443	2.0	
Turnout		22,616	95.0	
Labor gain from Liberal		Swing		

=== Dubbo ===
1953 New South Wales state election: Dubbo
Party	Candidate	Votes	%	±%
Labor	Clarrie Robertson	8,831	52.0	
Country	Robert Medcalf	8,140	48.0	
Total formal votes		16,971	98.2	
Informal votes		302	1.8	
Turnout		17,273	94.8	
Labor gain from Country		Swing		

=== Dulwich Hill ===
1953 New South Wales state election: Dulwich Hill
Party	Candidate	Votes	%	±%
Labor	George Weir	13,626	62.4	
Liberal	Basil Mottershead	8,196	37.6	
Total formal votes		21,822	97.9	
Informal votes		461	2.1	
Turnout		22,283	93.6	
Labor hold		Swing		

=== Earlwood ===
1953 New South Wales state election: Earlwood
Party	Candidate	Votes	%	±%
Liberal	Eric Willis	11,844	50.3	
Labor	Arthur Higgins	11,691	49.7	
Total formal votes		23,535	98.3	
Informal votes		401	1.7	
Turnout		23,936	95.5	
Liberal hold		Swing		

=== East Hills ===
1953 New South Wales state election: East Hills
Party	Candidate	Votes	%	±%
Labor	Arthur Williams	16,018	69.9	
Liberal	Armand Macquart	6,891	30.1	
Total formal votes		22,909	97.9	
Informal votes		489	2.1	
Turnout		23,398	94.0	
Labor notional hold		Swing	N/A	

=== Eastwood ===
1953 New South Wales state election: Eastwood
Party	Candidate	Votes	%	±%
Liberal	Eric Hearnshaw	12,757	59.0	
Labor	Francis Corcoran	5,525	25.6	
Independent	Francis Collings	3,335	15.4	
Total formal votes		21,617	98.4	
Informal votes		340	1.6	
Turnout		21,957	93.2	
Two-party-preferred result
Liberal	Eric Hearnshaw	15,132	70.0	
Labor	Francis Corcoran	6,485	30.0	
Liberal hold		Swing		

=== Fairfield ===
1953 New South Wales state election: Fairfield
Party	Candidate	Votes	%	±%
Labor	Clarrie Earl	17,322	91.3	
Communist	Edwin Lipscombe	1,642	8.7	
Total formal votes		18,964	90.3	
Informal votes		2,030	9.7	
Turnout		20,994	93.2	
Labor notional hold		Swing	N/A	

=== Georges River ===
1953 New South Wales state election: Georges River
Party	Candidate	Votes	%	±%
Labor	Frank O'Neill	12,310	58.6	
Liberal	Samuel Warren	8,711	41.4	
Total formal votes		21,021	98.0	
Informal votes		428	2.0	
Turnout		21,449	94.6	
Labor hold		Swing		

=== Gloucester ===
1953 New South Wales state election: Gloucester
Party	Candidate	Votes	%	±%
Country	Ray Fitzgerald	9,696	63.0	
Labor	Percy Randle	5,694	37.0	
Total formal votes		15,390	98.2	
Informal votes		276	1.8	
Turnout		15,666	94.8	
Country hold		Swing		

=== Gordon ===
1953 New South Wales state election: Gordon
Party	Candidate	Votes	%	±%
Liberal	Stewart Fraser	unopposed		
Liberal hold				

=== Gosford ===
1953 New South Wales state election: Gosford
Party	Candidate	Votes	%	±%
Liberal	Harold Jackson	9,576	54.0	
Labor	Rupert Wallace	8,160	46.0	
Total formal votes		17,736	98.0	
Informal votes		359	2.0	
Turnout		18,095	93.2	
Liberal hold		Swing		

=== Goulburn ===
1953 New South Wales state election: Goulburn
Party	Candidate	Votes	%	±%
Labor	Laurie Tully	10,155	62.6	
Liberal	Pat Osborne	6,069	37.4	
Total formal votes		16,224	98.2	
Informal votes		290	1.8	
Turnout		16,514	95.9	
Labor hold		Swing		

=== Granville ===
1953 New South Wales state election: Granville
Party	Candidate	Votes	%	±%
Labor	Bill Lamb	18,364	92.9	
Communist	Albert Williams	1,415	7.1	
Total formal votes		19,779	92.0	
Informal votes		1,729	8.0	
Turnout		21,508	94.7	
Labor hold		Swing		

=== Hamilton ===
1953 New South Wales state election: Hamilton
Party	Candidate	Votes	%	±%
Labor	George Campbell	10,884	64.2	
Liberal	John Milne	6,063	35.8	
Total formal votes		16,947	98.1	
Informal votes		327	1.9	
Turnout		17,274	94.8	
Labor hold		Swing		

=== Hartley ===
1953 New South Wales state election: Hartley
Party	Candidate	Votes	%	±%
Independent Labor	Jim Chalmers	9,815	57.2	
Labor	James Punch	5,443	31.7	
Communist	John King	1,901	11.1	
Total formal votes		17,159	96.5	
Informal votes		625	3.5	
Turnout		17,784	95.1	
Two-candidate-preferred result
Independent Labor	Jim Chalmers	10,765	62.7	
Labor	James Punch	6,394	37.3	
Member changed to Independent Labor from Labor		Swing	N/A	

=== Hawkesbury ===
1953 New South Wales state election: Hawkesbury
Party	Candidate	Votes	%	±%
Liberal	Bernie Deane	9,149	57.2	
Labor	John Egan	6,848	42.8	
Total formal votes		15,997	98.2	
Informal votes		293	1.8	
Turnout		16,290	92.6	
Liberal hold		Swing		

=== Hornsby ===
1953 New South Wales state election: Hornsby
Party	Candidate	Votes	%	±%
Liberal	Sydney Storey	12,744	60.5	
Independent	Leslie Matthews	6,868	32.6	
Independent	Victor Taylor	1,438	6.8	
Total formal votes		21,050	97.8	
Informal votes		465	2.2	
Turnout		21,515	92.6	
Two-candidate-preferred result
Liberal	Sydney Storey	13,463	63.9	
Independent	Leslie Matthews	7,587	36.1	
Liberal hold		Swing		

=== Hurstville ===
1953 New South Wales state election: Hurstville
Party	Candidate	Votes	%	±%
Labor	Clive Evatt	13,187	58.6	
Liberal	Bill Arthur	9,317	41.4	
Total formal votes		22,504	98.2	
Informal votes		404	1.8	
Turnout		22,908	95.1	
Labor hold		Swing		

=== Illawarra ===
1953 New South Wales state election: Illawarra
Party	Candidate	Votes	%	±%
Labor	Howard Fowles	unopposed		
Labor hold				

=== Kahibah ===
1953 New South Wales state election: Kahibah
Party	Candidate	Votes	%	±%
Labor	Joshua Arthur	11,093	64.7	
Liberal	Inglis Alexander	6,061	35.3	
Total formal votes		17,154	95.8	
Informal votes		759	4.2	
Turnout		17,913	96.0	
Labor hold		Swing		

=== King ===
1953 New South Wales state election: King
Party	Candidate	Votes	%	±%
Labor	Daniel Clyne	16,181	77.8	
Liberal	Roberta Galagher	4,628	22.2	
Total formal votes		20,809	96.2	
Informal votes		830	3.8	
Turnout		21,639	89.1	
Labor hold		Swing		

=== Kogarah ===
1953 New South Wales state election: Kogarah
Party	Candidate	Votes	%	±%
Labor	Bill Crabtree	12,486	55.7	
Liberal	Douglas Cross	9,927	44.3	
Total formal votes		22,413	98.2	
Informal votes		405	1.8	
Turnout		22,818	94.6	
Labor gain from Liberal		Swing		

=== Kurri Kurri ===
1953 New South Wales state election: Kurri Kurri
Party	Candidate	Votes	%	±%
Labor	George Booth	unopposed		
Labor hold				

=== Lake Macquarie ===
1953 New South Wales state election: Lake Macquarie
Party	Candidate	Votes	%	±%
Labor	Jim Simpson	unopposed		
Labor hold				

=== Lakemba ===
1953 New South Wales state election: Lakemba
Party	Candidate	Votes	%	±%
Labor	Stan Wyatt	15,008	68.8	
Liberal	George Chambers	6,813	31.2	
Total formal votes		21,821	98.4	
Informal votes		357	1.6	
Turnout		22,178	94.5	
Labor hold		Swing		

=== Lane Cove ===
1953 New South Wales state election: Lane Cove
Party	Candidate	Votes	%	±%
Liberal	Ken McCaw	13,514	65.4	
Labor	Alan Bagot	7,153	34.6	
Total formal votes		20,667	98.1	
Informal votes		390	1.9	
Turnout		21,057	93.0	
Liberal hold		Swing		

=== Leichhardt ===
1953 New South Wales state election: Leichhardt
Party	Candidate	Votes	%	±%
Labor	Claude Matthews	16,915	74.5	
Liberal	William Cole	5,794	25.5	
Total formal votes		22,709	97.3	
Informal votes		633	2.7	
Turnout		23,342	92.6	
Labor hold		Swing		

=== Lismore ===
1953 New South Wales state election: Lismore
Party	Candidate	Votes	%	±%
Country	Jack Easter	5,775	35.9	
Labor	Donald Watson (mathematician)	5,520	34.3	
Country	William Frith	4,786	29.8	
Total formal votes		16,081	98.9	
Informal votes		185	1.1	
Turnout		16,266	94.9	
Two-party-preferred result
Country	Jack Easter	10,132	63.0	
Labor	Donald Watson (mathematician)	5,949	37.0	
Country hold		Swing		

=== Liverpool ===
1953 New South Wales state election: Liverpool
Party	Candidate	Votes	%	±%
Labor	Jack Mannix	15,184	72.5	
Liberal	Madge Lee	5,752	27.5	
Total formal votes		20,936	97.5	
Informal votes		535	2.5	
Turnout		21,471	93.7	
Labor hold		Swing		

=== Liverpool Plains ===
1953 New South Wales state election: Liverpool Plains
Party	Candidate	Votes	%	±%
Labor	Roger Nott	9,560	59.0	
Country	Frank O'Keefe	4,583	28.3	
Liberal	James Reeves	2,071	12.8	
Total formal votes		16,214	98.9	
Informal votes		180	1.1	
Turnout		16,394	95.9	
Two-party-preferred result
Labor	Roger Nott	9,728	60.0	
Country	Frank O'Keefe	6,486	40.0	
Labor hold		Swing		

=== Maitland ===
1953 New South Wales state election: Maitland
Party	Candidate	Votes	%	±%
Liberal	Walter Howarth	8,520	53.8	
Labor	Leonard Neville	7,302	46.2	
Total formal votes		15,822	98.6	
Informal votes		216	1.4	
Turnout		16,038	96.6	
Liberal hold		Swing		

=== Manly ===
1953 New South Wales state election: Manly
Party	Candidate	Votes	%	±%
Liberal	Douglas Darby	12,583	62.6	
Labor	Malcolm Stuart-Robertson	7,512	37.4	
Total formal votes		20,095	98.3	
Informal votes		346	1.7	
Turnout		20,441	92.9	
Liberal hold		Swing		

=== Maroubra ===
1953 New South Wales state election: Maroubra
Party	Candidate	Votes	%	±%
Labor	Bob Heffron	unopposed		
Labor hold				

=== Marrickville ===
1953 New South Wales state election: Marrickville
Party	Candidate	Votes	%	±%
Labor	Phillip Ryan	16,893	80.8	
Independent	William McCristal	4,018	19.2	
Total formal votes		20,911	94.1	
Informal votes		1,320	5.9	
Turnout		22,231	94.1	
Labor hold		Swing		

=== Monaro ===
1953 New South Wales state election: Monaro
Party	Candidate	Votes	%	±%
Labor	John Seiffert	9,002	64.7	
Liberal	Ernest Smith	4,912	35.3	
Total formal votes		13,914	98.1	
Informal votes		272	1.9	
Turnout		14,186	94.3	
Member changed to Labor from Independent Labor		Swing		

- Seiffert had been allowed to re-join the Labor Party after being re-elected as an Independent Labor MP in 1950.

=== Mosman ===
1953 New South Wales state election: Mosman
Party	Candidate	Votes	%	±%
Liberal	Pat Morton	16,951	75.6	
Labor	Edna Ryan	5,474	24.4	
Total formal votes		22,425	97.8	
Informal votes		503	2.2	
Turnout		22,928	92.5	
Liberal hold		Swing		

=== Mudgee ===
1953 New South Wales state election: Mudgee
Party	Candidate	Votes	%	±%
Labor	Leo Nott	8,817	53.0	
Country	Frederick Cooke	7,818	47.0	
Total formal votes		16,635	98.4	
Informal votes		262	1.6	
Turnout		16,897	95.0	
Labor gain from Country		Swing		

=== Murray ===
1953 New South Wales state election: Murray
Party	Candidate	Votes	%	±%
Country	Joe Lawson	9,593	58.2	
Labor	Francis Holden	6,877	41.8	
Total formal votes		16,470	98.6	
Informal votes		239	1.4	
Turnout		16,709	89.2	
Country hold		Swing		

=== Murrumbidgee ===
1953 New South Wales state election: Murrumbidgee
Party	Candidate	Votes	%	±%
Labor	George Enticknap	10,388	62.3	
Country	Richard Cuthbert	6,296	37.7	
Total formal votes		16,684	98.2	
Informal votes		313	1.8	
Turnout		16,997	92.6	
Labor hold		Swing		

=== Nepean ===
1953 New South Wales state election: Nepean
Party	Candidate	Votes	%	±%
Liberal	Joseph Jackson	9,097	52.5	
Labor	Alexander Liston	8,213	47.5	
Total formal votes		17,310	98.1	
Informal votes		335	1.9	
Turnout		17,645	93.0	
Liberal hold		Swing		

=== Neutral Bay ===
1953 New South Wales state election: Neutral Bay
Party	Candidate	Votes	%	±%
Liberal	Ivan Black	unopposed		
Liberal hold				

=== Newcastle ===
1953 New South Wales state election: Newcastle
Party	Candidate	Votes	%	±%
Labor	Frank Hawkins	14,970	92.6	
Communist	Douglas Olive	1,202	7.4	
Total formal votes		16,172	94.9	
Informal votes		866	5.1	
Turnout		17,038	94.7	
Labor hold		Swing		

=== North Sydney ===
1953 New South Wales state election: North Sydney
Party	Candidate	Votes	%	±%
Liberal	Trevor Humphries	7,377	34.9	
Labor	Ray Maher	6,842	32.4	
Independent Labor	James Geraghty	6,718	31.8	
Independent	Norman Jacobs	187	0.9	
Total formal votes		21,124	97.5	
Informal votes		551	2.5	
Turnout		21,675	93.7	
Two-party-preferred result
Labor	Ray Maher	11,837	56.0	
Liberal	Trevor Humphries	9,287	44.0	
Labor gain from Independent Labor		Swing		

=== Orange ===
1953 New South Wales state election: Orange
Party	Candidate	Votes	%	±%
Country	Charles Cutler	9,801	54.3	
Labor	Louie Cassey	8,248	45.7	
Total formal votes		18,049	98.6	
Informal votes		260	1.4	
Turnout		18,309	95.6	
Country hold		Swing		

=== Oxley ===
1953 New South Wales state election: Oxley
Party	Candidate	Votes	%	±%
Country	Les Jordan	9,839	55.2	
Labor	William Kennewell	6,480	36.3	
Independent	Alan Borthwick	1,190	6.7	
Independent	Joseph Cordner	327	1.8	
Total formal votes		17,836	98.5	
Informal votes		273	1.5	
Turnout		18,109	96.5	
Two-party-preferred result
Country	Les Jordan	10,826	60.7	
Labor	William Kennewell	7,010	39.3	
Country hold		Swing		

=== Paddington ===
1953 New South Wales state election: Paddington
Party	Candidate	Votes	%	±%
Labor	Maurice O'Sullivan	17,596	87.0	
Communist	Bill Brown	2,641	13.0	
Total formal votes		20,237	92.7	
Informal votes		1,581	7.3	
Turnout		21,818	90.3	
Labor hold		Swing		

=== Parramatta ===
1953 New South Wales state election: Parramatta
Party	Candidate	Votes	%	±%
Labor	Kevin Moran	11,403	50.7	
Liberal	Arthur Butterell	10,746	47.8	
Independent	Edward Harding	333	1.5	
Total formal votes		22,482	98.2	
Informal votes		410	1.8	
Turnout		22,892	94.5	
Two-party-preferred result
Labor	Kevin Moran	11,578	51.5	
Liberal	Arthur Butterell	10,904	48.5	
Labor gain from Liberal		Swing		

=== Phillip ===
1953 New South Wales state election: Phillip
Party	Candidate	Votes	%	±%
Labor	Tom Shannon	unopposed		
Labor hold				

=== Raleigh ===
1953 New South Wales state election: Raleigh
Party	Candidate	Votes	%	±%
Labor	Clyde Reid	7,121	37.6	
Country	Radford Gamack	6,918	36.5	
Independent	Gordon Patterson	3,828	20.2	
Country	William Burns	1,092	5.8	
Total formal votes		18,959	98.4	
Informal votes		317	1.6	
Turnout		19,276	96.0	
Two-party-preferred result
Country	Radford Gamack	11,150	58.8	
Labor	Clyde Reid	7,809	41.2	
Country hold		Swing		

=== Randwick ===
1953 New South Wales state election: Randwick
Party	Candidate	Votes	%	±%
Labor	William Gollan	13,003	63.7	
Liberal	George Goodwin	7,399	36.3	
Total formal votes		20,402	98.0	
Informal votes		411	2.0	
Turnout		20,813	93.3	
Labor hold		Swing		

=== Redfern ===
1953 New South Wales state election: Redfern
Party	Candidate	Votes	%	±%
Labor	Fred Green	18,484	92.7	
Communist	Henry Hatfield	1,464	7.3	
Total formal votes		19,948	93.9	
Informal votes		1,295	6.1	
Turnout		21,243	92.2	
Labor hold		Swing		

=== Rockdale ===
1953 New South Wales state election: Rockdale
Party	Candidate	Votes	%	±%
Labor	John McGrath	14,041	60.5	
Liberal	Harold Heslehurst	9,165	39.5	
Total formal votes		23,206	97.9	
Informal votes		489	2.1	
Turnout		23,695	94.5	
Labor hold		Swing		

=== Ryde ===
1953 New South Wales state election: Ryde
Party	Candidate	Votes	%	±%
Labor	Frank Downing	12,121	54.5	
Liberal	Ken Anderson	10,114	45.5	
Total formal votes		22,235	98.1	
Informal votes		428	1.9	
Turnout		22,663	95.2	
Labor gain from Liberal		Swing		

=== South Coast ===
1953 New South Wales state election: South Coast
Party	Candidate	Votes	%	±%
Liberal	Jack Beale	9,874	60.8	
Labor	Alfred Berriman	6,376	39.2	
Total formal votes		16,250	98.8	
Informal votes		195	1.2	
Turnout		16,445	93.9	
Liberal hold		Swing		

=== Sturt ===
1953 New South Wales state election: Sturt
Party	Candidate	Votes	%	±%
Labor	William Wattison	unopposed		
Labor hold				

=== Sutherland ===
1953 New South Wales state election: Sutherland
Party	Candidate	Votes	%	±%
Labor	Tom Dalton	11,382	53.3	
Liberal	Cecil Monro	9,957	46.7	
Total formal votes		21,339	98.4	
Informal votes		336	1.6	
Turnout		21,675	93.9	
Labor gain from Liberal		Swing		

=== Tamworth ===
1953 New South Wales state election: Tamworth
Party	Candidate	Votes	%	±%
Country	Bill Chaffey	9,741	54.6	
Labor	William Scully	8,084	45.4	
Total formal votes		17,825	99.0	
Informal votes		179	1.0	
Turnout		18,004	95.9	
Country hold		Swing		

=== Temora ===
1953 New South Wales state election: Temora
Party	Candidate	Votes	%	±%
Country	Doug Dickson	9,524	61.2	
Labor	Hector Skidmore	6,028	38.8	
Total formal votes		15,552	98.8	
Informal votes		184	1.2	
Turnout		15,736	94.1	
Country hold		Swing		

=== Tenterfield ===
1953 New South Wales state election: Tenterfield
Party	Candidate	Votes	%	±%
Country	Michael Bruxner	8,585	60.1	
Labor	Frederick Cowley	5,688	39.9	
Total formal votes		14,273	98.6	
Informal votes		201	1.4	
Turnout		14,474	93.8	
Country hold		Swing		

=== Upper Hunter ===
1953 New South Wales state election: Upper Hunter
Party	Candidate	Votes	%	±%
Country	D'Arcy Rose	8,791	55.3	
Labor	George McGuirk	7,093	44.7	
Total formal votes		15,884	99.1	
Informal votes		144	0.9	
Turnout		16,028	95.7	
Country hold		Swing		

=== Vaucluse ===
1953 New South Wales state election: Vaucluse
Party	Candidate	Votes	%	±%
Liberal	Murray Robson	unopposed		
Liberal hold				

=== Wagga Wagga ===
1953 New South Wales state election: Wagga Wagga
Party	Candidate	Votes	%	±%
Labor	Eddie Graham	10,292	64.2	
Liberal	Wal Fife	4,350	27.1	
Country	William Wright	1,279	8.0	
Communist	Leslie Kelton	107	0.7	
Total formal votes		16,028	98.1	
Informal votes		314	1.9	
Turnout		16,342	94.3	
Two-party-preferred result
Labor	Eddie Graham	10,578	66.0	
Liberal	Wal Fife	5,450	34.0	
Labor hold		Swing		

=== Waratah ===
1953 New South Wales state election: Waratah
Party	Candidate	Votes	%	±%
Labor	Robert Cameron	12,187	67.9	
Independent	Alfred Hodge	5,760	32.1	
Total formal votes		17,947	97.1	
Informal votes		527	2.9	
Turnout		18,474	95.9	
Labor hold		Swing		

=== Waverley ===
1953 New South Wales state election: Waverley
Party	Candidate	Votes	%	±%
Labor	Clarrie Martin	14,354	68.5	
Liberal	Ben Doig	6,604	31.5	
Total formal votes		20,958	97.9	
Informal votes		456	2.1	
Turnout		21,414	91.1	
Labor hold		Swing		

=== Willoughby ===
1953 New South Wales state election: Willoughby
Party	Candidate	Votes	%	±%
Liberal	George Brain	14,524	64.6	
Labor	Joseph McNally	7,949	35.4	
Total formal votes		22,473	98.4	
Informal votes		356	1.6	
Turnout		22,829	93.8	
Liberal hold		Swing		

=== Wollondilly ===
1953 New South Wales state election: Wollondilly
Party	Candidate	Votes	%	±%
Liberal	Blake Pelly	9,747	56.9	
Labor	Albert Hughes	7,392	43.1	
Total formal votes		17,139	98.6	
Informal votes		248	1.4	
Turnout		17,387	94.2	
Liberal hold		Swing		

=== Wollongong-Kembla ===
1953 New South Wales state election: Wollongong-Kembla
Party	Candidate	Votes	%	±%
Labor	Rex Connor	9,073	54.9	
Independent	George Parker	6,722	40.6	
Communist	William Harkness	740	4.5	
Total formal votes		16,535	96.9	
Informal votes		524	3.1	
Turnout		17,059	94.6	
Two-candidate-preferred result
Labor	Rex Connor	9,443	57.1	
Independent	George Parker	7,092	42.9	
Labor hold		Swing		

=== Woollahra ===
1953 New South Wales state election: Woollahra
Party	Candidate	Votes	%	±%
Liberal	Vernon Treatt	15,203	67.6	
Labor	Norman Jacobs	7,283	32.4	
Total formal votes		22,486	97.6	
Informal votes		546	2.4	
Turnout		23,032	88.4	
Liberal hold		Swing		

=== Young ===
1953 New South Wales state election: Young
Party	Candidate	Votes	%	±%
Labor	Fred Cahill	10,802	57.2	
Country	Reg Hailstone	8,086	42.8	
Total formal votes		18,888	99.1	
Informal votes		161	0.9	
Turnout		19,049	95.6	

== See also ==
- Candidates of the 1953 New South Wales state election
- Members of the New South Wales Legislative Assembly, 1953–1956
