= 1905 Ashfield state by-election =

Election result for Ashfield, New South Wales, Australia

A by-election was held for the New South Wales Legislative Assembly electorate of Ashfield on 16 August 1905 because of the resignation of Frederick Winchcombe (Liberal Reform) who took an extended trip to Europe.

== Dates ==
Date	Event
3 August 1905	Frederick Winchcombe resigned.
4 August 1905	Writ of election issued by the Speaker of the Legislative Assembly.
11 August 1905	Nominations
16 August 1905	Polling day
25 August 1905	Return of writ

== Result ==
1905 Ashfield by-election Wednesday 16 August
Party	Candidate	Votes	%	±%
Liberal Reform	William Robson	2,259	60.3	−25.5
Independent	Alexander Miller	843	22.5	
Labor	Thomas Lumley	642	17.2	+3.0
Total formal votes		3,744	99.3	+0.7
Informal votes		28	0.7	−0.7
Turnout		3,772	46.1 (Note: Estimate based on a roll of 8,191 at the 1904 election.)	−3.5
Liberal Reform hold		Swing		

== See also ==
- Electoral results for the district of Ashfield
- List of New South Wales state by-elections
