= 1953 New South Wales state election =

State election for New South Wales, Australia in February 1953

← 1950	14 February 1953	1956 →

All 94 seats in the New South Wales Legislative Assembly 48 Assembly seats were needed for a majority
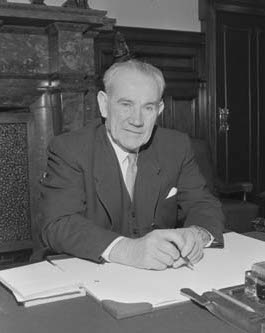

	First party	Second party
Leader	Joseph Cahill	Vernon Treatt
Party	Labor	Liberal/Country coalition
Leader since	2 April 1952	20 March 1946
Leader's seat	Cook's River	Woollahra
Last election	46 seats	46 seats
Seats won	57	36
Seat change	▲11	▼10
Percentage	55.03%	39.54%
Swing	▲8.3	▼6.9
- Two-candidate-preferred margin by electorate
Premier before election
Joseph Cahill
Labor
Elected Premier
Joseph Cahill
Labor

The 1953 New South Wales state election was held on 14 February 1953. It was conducted in single member constituencies with compulsory preferential voting and was held on boundaries created at a 1952 redistribution. The election was for all of the 94 seats in the Legislative Assembly.

== Issues ==
In February 1953, the ALP had been in power for 12 years and James McGirr, who had led the party to a near defeat in 1950, had lost the premiership to Joe Cahill 10 months earlier. McGirr's period as the Labor leader had been marked by policy indecisiveness, budget overspending and internal conflict. Cahill, by contrast, had won popular support as a vigorous and impressive minister who had resolved problems with New South Wales' electricity supply. During his first 10 months as premier, he had reinvigorated the party. He appeared decisive and brought order to the government's chaotic public works program. In addition, he astutely attacked the increasingly unpopular federal Coalition government of Robert Menzies.

By contrast, the Liberal Party and Country Party coalition led by Vernon Treatt and Michael Bruxner was racked with internal divisions. Treatt himself, despite having been opposition leader for seven years, remained little known to the public. Whereas in 1950 his coalition had achieved a big swing against the ALP, in 1953 he was unable to convince voters that he possessed a coherent alternative policy to the government.

== Key dates ==
Date	Event
14 January 1953	The Legislative Assembly was dissolved, and writs were issued by the Governor to proceed with an election.
19 January 1953	Nominations for candidates for the election closed at noon.
14 February 1953	Polling day.
23 February 1953	Second Cahill ministry sworn in
14 March 1953	Last day for the writs to be returned and the results formally declared.
11 March 1953	Opening of 37th Parliament.

== Results ==
The result of the election was a landslide victory for Labor. Labor's vote was particularly strong in the Western and Southern suburbs of Sydney. It won the seats of Concord, Coogee, Drummoyne, Kogarah, Parramatta, Ryde and Sutherland from the Liberal Party and picked up the new suburban seats of East Hills and Fairfield. Labor's vote was resurgent in rural New South Wales where it won the seats of Armidale, Dubbo and Mudgee from the Country party. Labor also picked up the seat of North Sydney from Independent member James Geraghty who was the last of the 4 Independent members of parliament who had been expelled from the Labor party for disloyalty during an indirect election of the Legislative Council in 1949. John Seiffert, another rebel from 1949 and the member for Monaro, had been readmitted to the party in 1950 and retained the seat at this election, giving a further boost to Labor's numbers. Labor's losses included Ashfield which had been won from the Liberal Party at the 1952 by-election and Hartley which was retained by Jim Chalmers who stood as an Independent Labor candidate after he resigned from the party over a pre-selection dispute. The Minister for Labour, Industry and Social Welfare, Frank Finnan was unseated when his electorate of Darlinghurst was abolished, he lost a preselection contest for Concord, and he failed in an attempt to win Albury.

New South Wales state election, 14 February 1953 Legislative Assembly << 1950–1956 >>
Enrolled voters	1,953,953 (Note: There were 1,692,231 enrolled voters in 81 contested electorates and 261,722 were enrolled in 13 uncontested electorates (9 Labor, 3 Liberal and 1 Country ).)				
Votes cast	1,548,877		Turnout	93.86	+1.11
Informal votes	39,416		Informal	2.48	+0.71
Summary of votes by party
Party	Primary votes	%	Swing	Seats	Change
Labor	852,276	55.03	+8.28	57	+11
Liberal	432,739	27.94	−9.57	22	−7
Country	179,680	11.60	+2.63	14	−3
Independent	38,822	2.51	+0.20	0	−
Communist	21,421	1.38	+0.54	0	−
Independent Labor	16,533	1.07	−0.58	1	− 1
Lang Labor	7,046	0.48	−0.74	0	−
Total	1,588,293			94	

== Retiring members ==
=== Labor ===
- Carlo Lazzarini (Marrickville) had died in late 1952 but no by-election was held.
- Arthur Greenup (Newtown-Annandale) the district was abolished in the 1952 redistribution, and he was defeated in the preselection contest for Marrickville.

=== Liberal ===
- Harry Turner (Gordon) had resigned in late 1952 to run for a federal seat. No by-election was held.
- George Gollan (Parramatta).

=== Country ===
- Roy Vincent (Raleigh).

== Seats changing party representation ==
Seat	1950		1953	
Seat	Party	Member	Member	Party
Armidale	Country	Davis Hughes	Jim Cahill	Labor
Ashfield (Note: Athol Richardson (Liberal) held the seat at the 1950 election, however he was appointed to the Supreme Court and Jack Richardson (Labor) won the seat at the 1952 by-election.)	Liberal		Richard Murden	Liberal
Concord	Liberal	John Adamson	Thomas Murphy	Labor
Coogee	Liberal	Kevin Ellis	Lou Walsh	Labor
Darlinghurst	Labor	Frank Finnan (Note: Frank Finnan unsuccessfully contested Albury.)	Seat abolished	
Drummoyne	Liberal	Robert Dewley	Roy Jackson	Labor
Dubbo	Country	Robert Medcalf	Clarrie Robertson	Labor
East Hills		New seat (Note: East Hills and Fairfield were notionally Labor seats.)	Arthur Williams	Labor
Fairfield		New seat	Clarrie Earl	Labor
Hartley	Labor	Jim Chalmers		Independent Labor
Kogarah	Liberal	Douglas Cross	Bill Crabtree	Labor
Monaro	Independent Labor	John Seiffert		Labor
Mudgee	Country	Frederick Cooke	Leo Nott	Labor
Newtown-Annandale	Labor	Arthur Greenup (Note: Arthur Greenup was defeated in the preselection contest for Marrickville.)	Seat abolished	
North Sydney	Independent Labor	James Geraghty	Ray Maher	Labor
Parramatta	Liberal	George Gollan	Kevin Morgan	Labor
Ryde	Liberal	Ken Anderson	Frank Downing	Labor
Sutherland	Liberal	Cecil Monro	Tom Dalton	Labor

== Aftermath ==
Joe Cahill's triumph at this election ensured that he remained premier during the course of the parliament. Treatt faced increasing opposition within the Liberal Party and was replaced as Leader of the Opposition by Murray Robson in August 1954. Bruxner continued as the Leader of the Country Party, a position he had held since 1932. During the parliament there were 7 by-elections with no change of party representation except for Kahibah where an Independent Labor candidate Tom Armstrong defeated the endorsed Labor candidate.

== See also ==
- Candidates of the 1953 New South Wales state election
- Members of the New South Wales Legislative Assembly, 1953–1956
