= 1900 Ashfield colonial by-election =

Election result for Ashfield, New South Wales, Australia

A by-election was held for the New South Wales Legislative Assembly electorate of Ashfield on 10 November 1900 because Bernhard Wise (Protectionist) had been appointed to the Legislative Council.

== Dates ==
Date	Event
30 October 1900	Bernhard Wise appointed to the Legislative Council.
31 October 1900	Writ of election issued by the Speaker of the Legislative Assembly.
7 November 1900	Nominations
10 November 1900	Polling day
16 November 1900	Return of writ

== Result ==
1900 Ashfield by-election Saturday 10 November
Party	Candidate	Votes	%	±%
Free Trade	Frederick Winchcombe	968	60.4	+10.5
Protectionist	John Watkin	634	39.6	−10.5
Total formal votes		1,602	100.0	+0.4
Informal votes		0	0.0	−0.4
Turnout		1,602	45.5 (Note: Estimate based on a roll of 3,234 at the 1899 by-election.)	−20.4
Free Trade gain from Protectionist		Swing	+10.5	

== See also ==
- Electoral results for the district of Ashfield
- List of New South Wales state by-elections
