= 1929 Ashfield state by-election =

Election result for Ashfield, New South Wales, Australia

A by-election was held for the New South Wales Legislative Assembly electorate of Ashfield on 5 October 1929 because of the resignation of Milton Jarvie (Nationalist).

Sir Colin Davidson, a Judge of the Supreme Court, was appointed to conduct a Royal Commission to investigate whether there were attempts at bribery with an application for a Campsie bus service. On 7 June 1929 the Royal Commission reported its findings, including that Jarvie had attempted to bribe Albert Bruntnell who was the Chief Secretary. Jarvie was charged with criminal offences, however on 1 July 1929 he was found not guilty. Jarvie nonetheless resigned so that the electors of Ashfield could return him with an overwhelming majority.

== Dates ==
Date	Event
7 June 1929	Royal Commission report given to Governor.
1 July 1929	Jarvie found not guilty.
17 September 1929	Jarvie resigned.
19 September 1929	Writ of election issued by the Speaker of the Legislative Assembly.
24 September 1929	Nominations
5 October 1929	Polling day
18 October 1929	Return of writ

== Result ==
1929 Ashfield by-election Saturday 5 October
Party	Candidate	Votes	%	±%
Labor	John Clancy	3,526	38.4	+12.5
Nationalist	Milton Jarvie	3,484	38.0	−20.2
Independent	Alexander Huie	1,692	18.5	+2.6
Nationalist	Reginald Kirkwood	281	3.1	+3.1
Nationalist	Albert Pikett	190	2.1	+2.1
Total formal votes		9,173	99.0	−0.2
Informal votes		95	1.0	+0.2
Turnout		9,268	71.9	−13.9
Two-party-preferred result
Nationalist	Milton Jarvie (re-elected)	4,376	51.5	
Labor	John Clancy	4,128	48.5	
Nationalist hold		Swing	N/A	

== See also ==
- Electoral results for the district of Ashfield
- List of New South Wales state by-elections
