= Municipality of Ashfield =

Former local government area in New South Wales, Australia

- Local government area
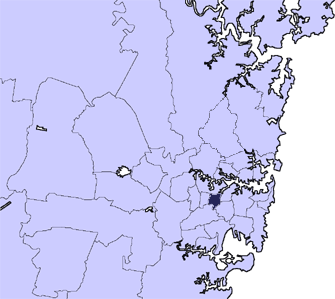
- Location in Metropolitan Sydney, 1871–2016

- Coordinates: 33°53′S 151°08′E
- Country: Australia
- State: New South Wales
- Region: Inner West
- Established: 28 December 1871
- Abolished: 12 May 2016
- Council seat: Civic Centre, Ashfield

Area
  - Total: 8 km^{2} (3.1 sq mi)

Population
  - Total: 41,214 (2011 census)
  - Density: 4,971.5/km^{2} (12,876/sq mi)
LGAs around Municipality of Ashfield
Canada Bay	Iron Cove	Leichhardt
Burwood	Municipality of Ashfield	Leichhardt
Canterbury	Canterbury	Petersham/ Marrickville

The Municipality of Ashfield was a local government area in the Inner West of Sydney, New South Wales, Australia. It is about 10 kilometres (6.2 mi) west of the Sydney central business district. The municipality was proclaimed on 28 December 1871 as the "Borough of Ashfield", which changed to the "Municipality of Ashfield" in 1906. On 12 May 2016, Ashfield merged with Marrickville Council and the Municipality of Leichhardt to form the Inner West Council.

The last mayor of the municipality was councillor Lucille McKenna, a member of the Australian Labor Party.

In December 2021, a majority of voters in Inner West Council voted in favour of reversing the 2016 merger and separating the three pre-existing councils of Ashfield, Leichhardt and Marrickville.

== Suburbs ==
The municipality comprised the following suburbs and localities:

- Ashfield
- Dobroyd Point
- Haberfield
- Summer Hill

It also included parts of:

- Ashbury (shared with City of Canterbury)
- Croydon (shared with Municipality of Burwood)
- Hurlstone Park (shared with City of Canterbury)
- Croydon Park (shared with City of Canterbury and the Municipality of Burwood)

== Council history ==
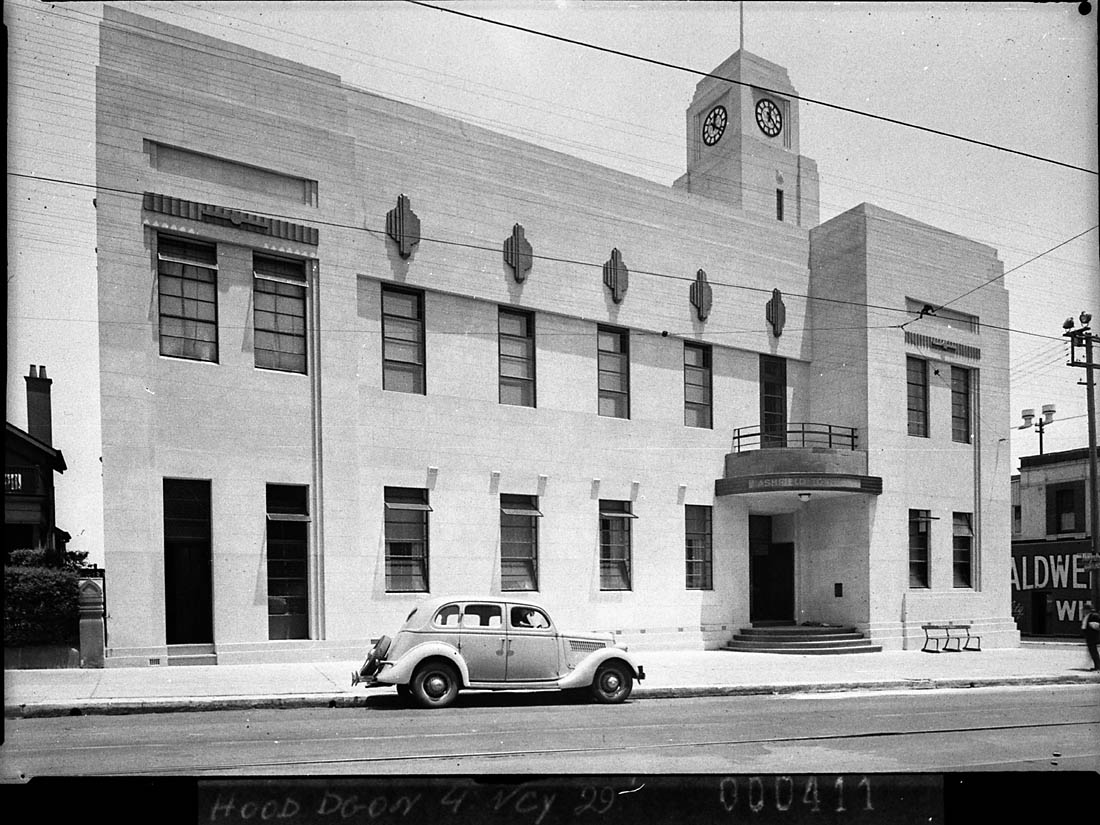
Ashfield Town Hall in 1938. The original Victorian building was extensively remodelled in the Art Deco style in the 1920s. This building was demolished in the 1970s to make way for Ashfield Mall and the current Civic Centre.

The "Borough of Ashfield" was proclaimed in the New South Wales Government Gazette on 28 December 1871 and was originally divided into two wards, North Ward and South Ward.

Local issues in the area, before the forced merge into Inner West Council, included the redevelopment of Ashfield Mall and concerns about overdevelopment in general; construction of the M4 East tunnel because it might lead to increased traffic and pollution; and the general state of the commercial area, which one councillor labelled 'Trashfield'. Also contentious was Ashfield Council itself. In 2003, it was described by the Daily Telegraph as one of the worst councils in Sydney after one councillor took out a restraining order against another. By 2008, another councillor was sacked for not being a bona fide resident of the municipality while other councillors had made outspoken comments on issues such as the Iraq War, bird flu, the Monarchy and 30 km/h speed limits within residential areas. In 2009, Councillor Nick Adams was given a six-month suspension from the Liberal Party of Australia for conduct deemed likely to "embarrass or cause damage to" the Party during an altercation with a journalist.

A 2015 review of local government boundaries recommended that the Municipality of Ashfield merge with the Municipality of Leichhardt and the Marrickville Council to form a new council with an area of 35 square kilometres (14 sq mi) and support a population of approximately 186,000. On 12 May 2016, Ashfield merged with Marrickville Council and the Municipality of Leichhardt to form the Inner West Council.

== Demographics ==
At the 2011 Census, there were 41,214 people in the Ashfield local government area, of these 48.6% were male and 51.4% were female. Aboriginal and Torres Strait Islander people made up 0.6% of the population. The median age of people in the Municipality of Ashfield was 37 years. Children aged 0 – 14 years made up 15.1% of the population and people aged 65 years and over made up 14.4% of the population. Of people in the area aged 15 years and over, 45.1% were married and 10.0% were either divorced or separated.

Population growth in The Municipality of Ashfield between the 2001 Census and the 2006 Census was 1.76%; while in the subsequent five years to the 2011 Census, population growth was 3.90%. When compared with total population growth of Australia for the same periods, being 5.78% and 8.32% respectively, population growth in Ashfield local government area was significantly less than the national average. The median weekly income for residents within the Municipality of Ashfield of was generally on par with the national average.

At the 2011 Census, the proportion of residents in Ashfield local government area who stated their ancestry as Chinese was in excess of four times the state and national averages; and the proportion of households where an Asian language was spoken at home was about six times higher than the national average.

Historical census data for Ashfield local government area
Population		2001	2006	2011
Population	Estimated residents on Census night	38,981	39,667	41,214
Population	LGA rank in terms of size within New South Wales		54	
Population	% of New South Wales population		0.6%	0.60%
Population	% of Australian population	0.21%	▼0.20%	▼0.19%
Cultural and language diversity				
Ancestry, top responses	English			14.9%
Ancestry, top responses	Australian			14.8%
Ancestry, top responses	Chinese			13.3%
Ancestry, top responses	Italian			8.5%
Ancestry, top responses	Irish			6.9%
Language, top responses (other than English)	Mandarin	6.1%	▲8.8%	▲9.1%
Language, top responses (other than English)	Italian	9.2%	▼7.7%	▼6.8%
Language, top responses (other than English)	Cantonese	4.9%	4.9%	▼4.5%
Language, top responses (other than English)	Nepali	n/c	n/c	▲2.7%
Language, top responses (other than English)	Greek	2.6%	▼2.4%	▼2.3%
Religious affiliation				
Religious affiliation, top responses	Catholic	36.6%	▼33.7%	▼30.6%
Religious affiliation, top responses	No religion	16.9%	▲20.9%	▲25.8%
Religious affiliation, top responses	Anglican	10.5%	▼8.8%	▼7.8%
Religious affiliation, top responses	Hinduism	n/c	n/c	▲5.8%
Religious affiliation, top responses	Buddhism	4.2%	▲4.7%	▲5.3%
Median weekly incomes				
Personal income	Median weekly personal income		A$514	A$628
Personal income	% of Australian median income			108.8%
Family income	Median weekly family income		A$1,101	A$1,689
Family income	% of Australian median income		107.2%	114.0%
Household income	Median weekly household income		A$1,304	A$1,413
Household income	% of Australian median income		111.4%	114.5%

== Council ==
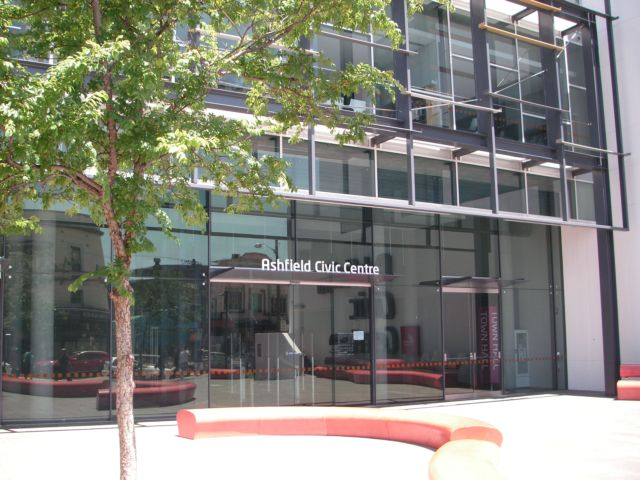
New Ashfield Civic Centre

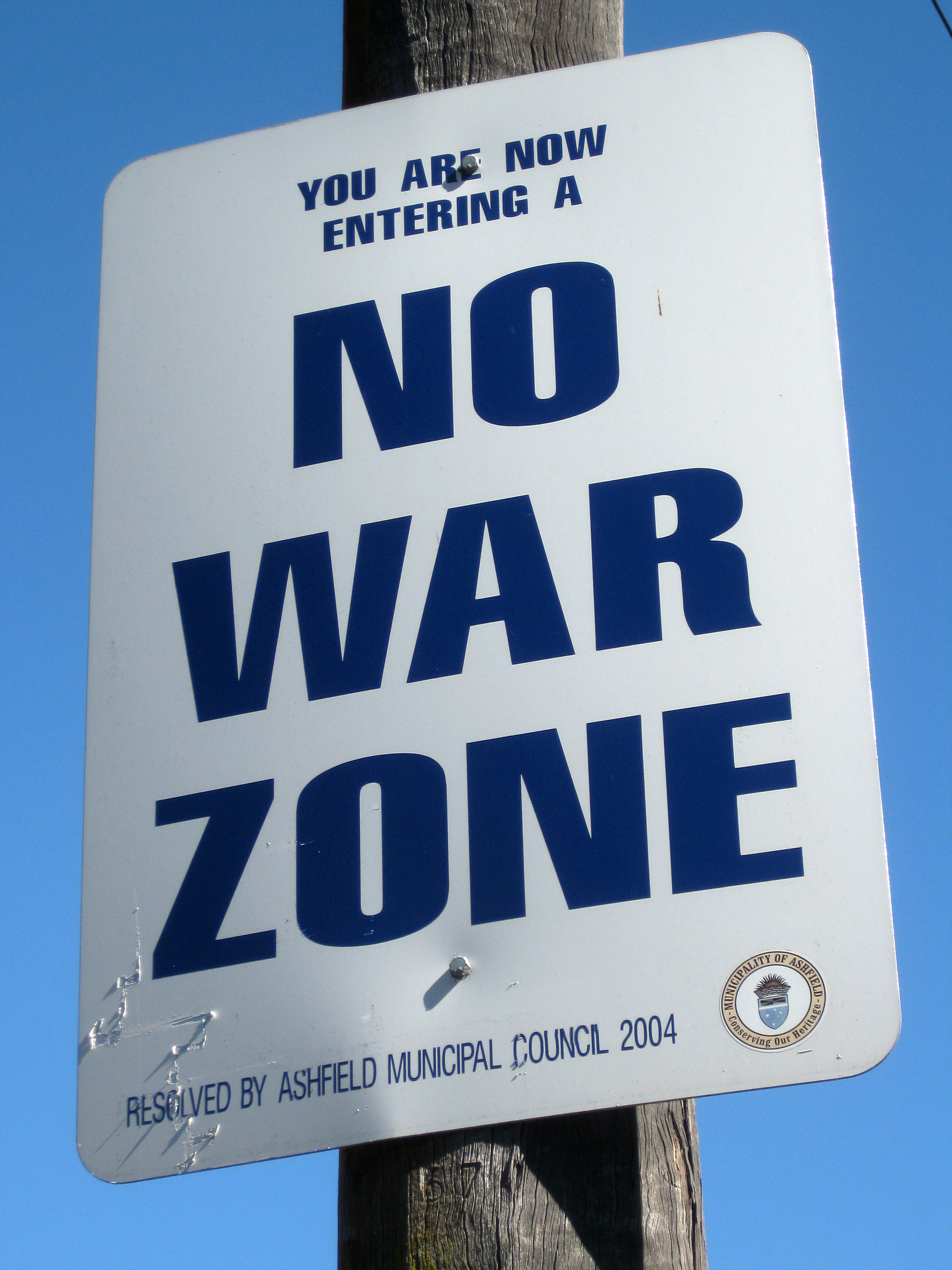
The Municipality of Ashfield became a "no war zone" following a 2004 motion.

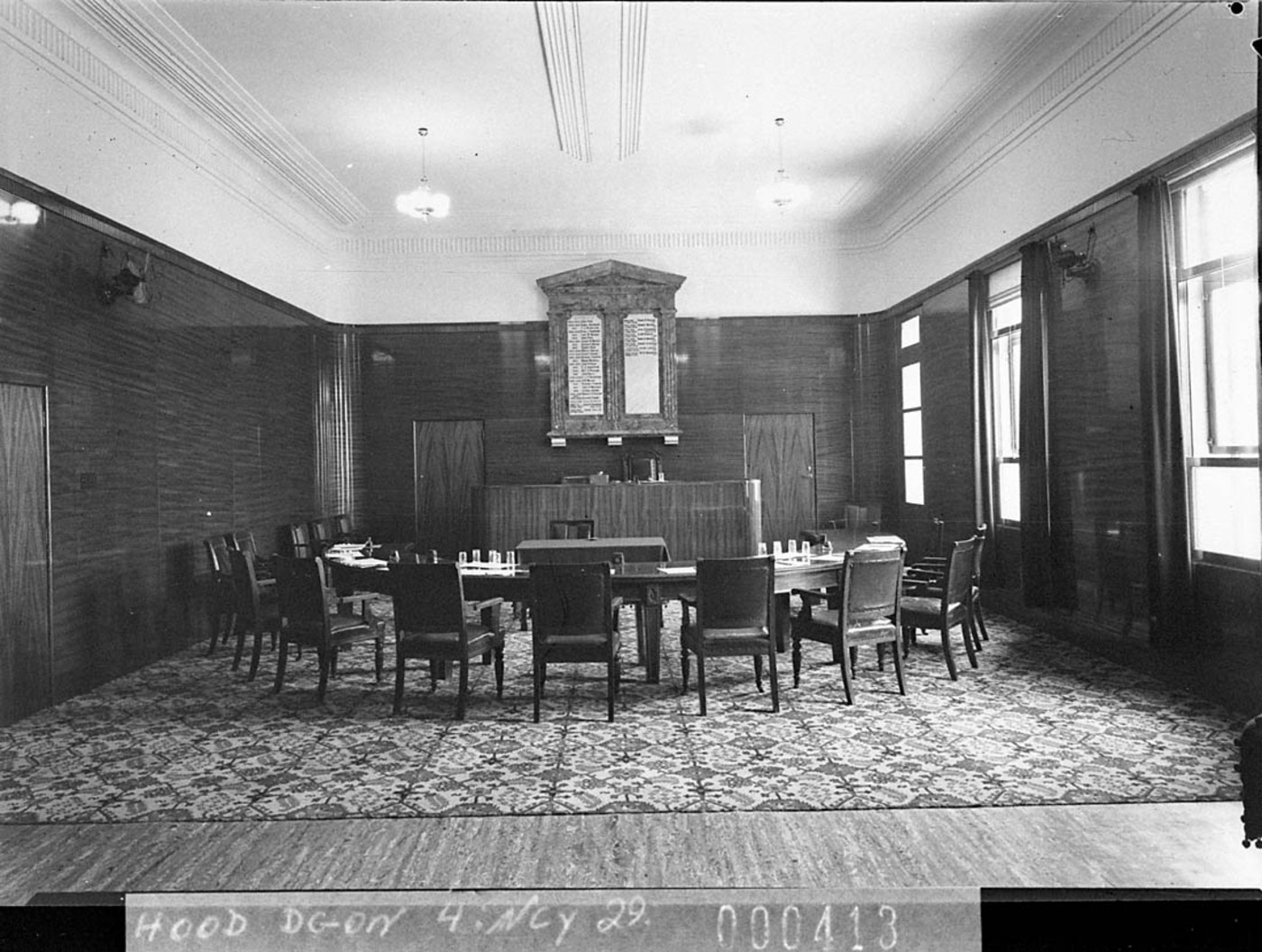
The Council Chamber within the original Ashfield Town Hall in 1938.

=== Final composition and election method ===
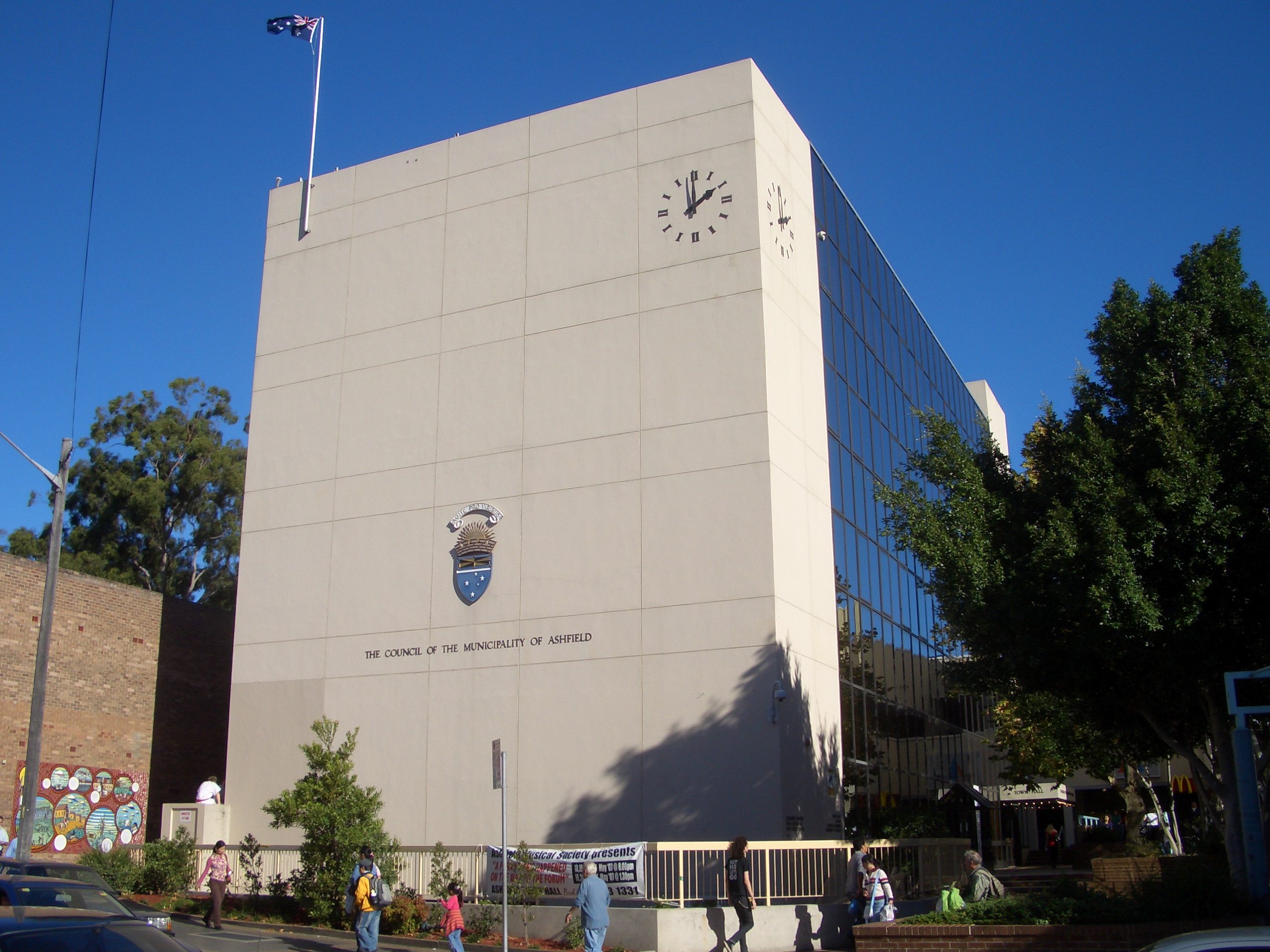
Ashfield Council building

The former Ashfield Municipal Council was generally considered a safe Labor area. As the attached table shows, Labor outpolled all other parties in the area at the final federal, state and council elections before the merge. However, the Liberals and Greens had strong voices in the area with the Council electing a member of the Greens Party as mayor and the northern part of Ashfield was represented by a Liberal Party member in the NSW Parliament. Prior to the 1970s, the area was more conservative, generally returning members who were Free Trade, Nationalist, UAP or Liberal although it wasn't unheard of for Labor members to get elected during this period.

The final council was composed of four Labor councillors, four independents and four Liberals. The last mayor was Lucille McKenna, the Council's first woman mayor.

Ashfield Municipal Council was composed of twelve councillors elected proportionally as four separate wards, each electing three Councillors. All Councillors were elected for a fixed four-year term of office. The mayor and deputy mayor were elected for a one-year term by the councillors at the first meeting of the council in September. The last election was held on 13 September 2012, and the makeup of the council for the term 2012–16, in order of election by ward, was as follows:

Ward	Councillor	Party	Notes
East Ward	Julie Passas	Liberal	
East Ward	Alex Lofts	Labor	Deputy Mayor
East Ward	Caroline Stott	Independent	
North East Ward	Ted Cassidy PSM	Independent	
North East Ward	Vittoria Raciti	Liberals	
North East Ward	Lucille McKenna	Labor	Mayor 2013–2016
North Ward	Adriano Raiola	Liberal	
North Ward	Monica Wangmann	Independent	
North Ward	Mei Wang	Labor	
South Ward	Mark Drury	Labor	
South Ward	Max Raiola	Liberal	
South Ward	Morris Mansour	Independent	Mayor 2012–2013

=== Mayors ===
#	Mayor	Party	Term start	Term end	Notes
1	John Pope		1872	1873	
2	Daniel Holborow		1874	1880	
3	Thomas Nicholson		1881	1881	
4	Mark Hammond		1882	1884	
5	John Watkin		1884	1884	
1 (2nd term)	John Pope		1885	1885	
6	Joseph Mortley		1886	1887	
7	Joseph Watkin		1888	1888	
8	Thomas Dean		1888	1888	
9	Robert Dougan		1889	1890	
10	Albert Brown		1891	1892	
11	Richard Stanton		1893	7 March 1895	
12	Ninian Melville	Protectionist	8 March 1895	23 February 1896	
13	John Upward		24 February 1896	1897	
14	Francis Josephson		1898	1898	
15	William Robson	Free Trade	1899	1899	
16	John Mills		1900	1900	
17	Ernest Broughton	Liberal Reform	1901	1902	
18	Arthur Miller	Liberal Reform	1903	1905	
11 (2nd term)	Richard Stanton		1906	1906	
19	Charles Websdale		1907	1907	
20	George Brown		1908	1908	
21	Herbert Pratten	Liberal Reform	1909	1911	
22	Alfred Crane	Liberal Reform	1911	1912	
23	Charles Algie		1913	1914	
24	John Hammond		1915	1917	
25	John Yeo		1917	1919	
26	Frank Hedger	Nationalist	1919	1920	
27	George Watson	Nationalist	1920	1922	
24 (2nd term)	John Hammond		1922	1923	
28	D McDonald	Nationalist	1923	1925	
26 (2nd term)	Frank Hedger	Nationalist	1925	1929	
29	Henry Gough	Nationalist	1929	1932	
30	John Lapish	United Australia	1932	1933	
31	William Grainger	United Australia	1933	1935	
32	Thomas Cavill	United Australia	1935	1938	
33	Edward Allman	United Australia	1938	1943	
34	J Lindsay		1943	1944	
32 (2nd term)	Thomas Cavill	Liberal	1944	1946	
35	Ralph Tetley	Liberal	1946	1948	
36	Thomas Marshall	Independent	1948	1950	
37	Richard Murden	Liberal	1950	1952	
38	Herbert Bailey	Liberal	1952	1954	
39	James Blackwood		1954	1957	
40	Charles Bullivant		1957	1959	
41	Darrell Jackson		1959	1962	
42	William Peters	Labor	1962	1964	
43	Bede Spillane	Labor	1964	1965	
44	Allan Crawford		1965	1967	
37 (2nd term)	Richard Murden	Liberal	December 1967	September 1972	
45	Paul Whelan	Labor	September 1972	September 1976	
46	Lew Herman	Labor	September 1976	September 1991	
47	Dr John Ward	Independent	September 1991	September 1995	
46 (2nd term)	Lew Herman	Labor	September 1995	September 1996	
48	Vincent Sicari	No Aircraft Noise	September 1996	September 1997	
49	Mark Bonanno	Labor	September 1997	March 2004	
50	Rae Desmond Jones	Labor	March 2004	September 2006	
51	Ted Cassidy	Independent	September 2006	September 2011	
52	Lyall Kennedy	Greens	September 2011	September 2012	
53	Morris Mansour	Independent	September 2012	September 2013	
54	Lucille McKenna	Labor	September 2013	12 May 2016	

== Coat of arms and logo ==
Coat of arms of Municipality of Ashfield
Notes The arms of the Municipality of Ashfield were granted by the Lord Lyon King of Arms, College of Arms, in 1983 and resulted from a visit for Scottish week in 1982 by Sir Crispin Agnew of Lochnaw (Chief of the Clan Agnew), who suggested that the council pursue the granting of a Coat of Arms based on its early associations with Robert Campbell, an early landowner who named his estates "Ashfield Park", which gave the council its name. He was subsequently commissioned to design the arms, which were granted in 1983. Adopted 1983 Crest Above the Shield is placed a coronet appropriate to the Municipality (videlicet:- a mural coronet Proper masoned Sable), and on a Wreath of the Liveried is set for Crest a sun rising Or. Escutcheon Azure, five mullets (arranged to represent the constellation of the Southern Cross). Argent a chief gyronny of eight Or and Sable within a cordure azure charged of eight annulets Or, the chief with a fillet Argent in the lower part. Motto AGITE PRO VIRIBUS ("Act according to your strength") Symbolism The arms are based on arms of Robert Campbell, who registered his arms with Lord Lyon.

=== Logo ===
Ashfield Council launched a new logo and branding in August 2008, described as an "urban map" of various images representing various buildings and forms in the local area. This branding remained in use (with the arms retained for the most formal uses) until the council's amalgamation.
