= 1946 Ashfield state by-election =

Election result for Ashfield, New South Wales, Australia

A by-election was held for the New South Wales Legislative Assembly electorate of Ashfield on 9 November 1946 because of the resignation of Athol Richardson (Liberal) to contest the federal seat of Parkes at the 1946 election. Richardson was narrowly defeated, and nominated as a candidate to regain the seat.

== Dates ==
Date	Event
16 August 1946	Athol Richardson resigned.
28 September 1946	Federal election.
15 October 1946	Writ of election issued by the Speaker of the Legislative Assembly.
21 October 1946	Nominations
9 November 1946	Polling day
27 November 1946	Return of writ

== Result ==
1946 Ashfield by-election Saturday 9 November
Party	Candidate	Votes	%	±%
Liberal	Athol Richardson (re-elected)	12,036	56.5	+3.1
Labor	William Peters	9,265	43.5	−3.1
Total formal votes		21,301	98.9	+2.1
Informal votes		231	1.1	−2.1
Turnout		21,532	87.6	−6.2
Liberal hold		Swing	+3.1	

== See also ==
- Electoral results for the district of Ashfield
- List of New South Wales state by-elections
