= William Peters (Australian politician) =

Australian politician (1903–1978)

Personal details
- Born: 3 March 1903 Pyrmont, New South Wales
- Died: 21 February 1978 (aged 74) Lewisham, New South Wales
- Party: Labor Party

William Charles Peters (15 April 1903 – 21 February 1978) was an Australian politician and a member of the New South Wales Legislative Council between 1959 and 1978. He was a member of the Labor Party.

Peters began his working life as a hatter and joined the Felt Hatters Union when he was 16 years old. His union interest eventually overtook his career as a hatter and he was secretary of the union for 36 years from 1936 to 1972.

He contested a by-election in 1946 for the state seat of Ashfield for the Labor Party but was defeated by the Liberal incumbent Athol Richardson. He again contested Ashfield at the 1947 election but was again defeated by Richardson. Six years later he was elected to Ashfield Council where he served for 24 years including two years as mayor from 1962 to 1964.

In 1959, George Neilly resigned his seat in the Legislative Council to contest the lower house seat of Cessnock. Peters won the Labor nomination for the vacant seat and held his place until his death. He did not hold ministerial office.
