= 1899 Ashfield colonial by-election =

Election result for Ashfield, New South Wales, Australia

A by-election was held for the New South Wales Legislative Assembly electorate of Ashfield on 26 September 1899 because Bernhard Wise (Protectionist) had been appointed Attorney General. Until 1904, members appointed to a ministerial position were required to face a by-election. These were generally uncontested. Of the nine ministers appointed with the formation of Lyne ministry, Ashfield and Hume (William Lyne) were the only electorates in which the by-election was contested.

== Dates ==
Date	Event
14 September 1899	Bernhard Wise appointed Attorney General.
15 September 1899	Writ of election issued by the Speaker of the Legislative Assembly.
22 September 1899	Nominations
26 September 1899	Polling day
4 October 1899	Return of writ

== Result ==
1899 Ashfield by-election Tuesday 26 September
Party	Candidate	Votes	%	±%
Protectionist	Bernhard Wise (re-elected)	831	50.6	+0.5
Free Trade	Thomas Bavister	810	49.4	−0.5
Total formal votes		1,641	99.5	−0.1
Informal votes		8	0.5	+0.1
Turnout		1,649	51.0	−14.9
Protectionist hold		Swing	+0.5	

== See also ==
- Electoral results for the district of Ashfield
