= Schools Club =

- Type: Gentlemen's club
- Founded: 1927
- Founder: Eric Kelynack
- Successor: The University & Schools Club 1977; Union, University & Schools Club 2007
- Headquarters: Sydney, Australia

Schools Club was a private, social club in Australia, founded in February 1927. After mergers in 1977 and 2007 the club is now the Union, University & Schools Club.

== History ==
In the early 1920s the old boys of five of the Great Public Schools of New South Wales decided to establish a Sydney central business district base for their fellow alumni. Those involved in the development of this idea wanted to provide a clubhouse where men, who had recently left school and had undertaken business careers, could meet. It was anticipated that these club facilities would assist the schools' sporting and development appeals. The founding president was an Old Newingtonian, Eric Kelynack (1882-1957), who was a former chairman of the Institute of Incorporated Accountants. He was the son of the Rev Dr William Kelynack a notable Methodist churchman and former President of Newington. The club opened in premises owned by the Fairfax newspaper family at a building that was later demolished for the development of Australia Square.

== Membership ==
Membership was originally open to the alumni of Newington College, The King's School, Sydney Grammar School, Sydney Church of England Grammar School and The Scots College. In 1970, the alumni of all Headmasters' Conference of the Independent Schools of Australia became eligible to join the club.

== Facilities ==
Initially some facilities were shared but each member school managed a separate club room in its own style. Because some members were under the legal drinking age the club didn't become licensed until 1947. The original clubhouse was demolished in 1962 for the Australia Square development and the club transferred to a new building near Circular Quay. In the mid-1970s the club sold its premises and merged with the University Club. It moved to Phillip Street to form The University & Schools Club.

== See also ==
- Australian Club
- Public Schools Club
