= 1952 Ashfield state by-election =

Election result for Ashfield, New South Wales, Australia

A by-election was held for the New South Wales Legislative Assembly electorate of Ashfield on 28 June 1952 because of the resignation of Athol Richardson (Liberal) who had accepted an appointment as a Judge of the Supreme Court.

== Dates ==
Date	Event
29 April 1952	Athol Richardson resigned.
23 May 1952	Writ of election issued by the Speaker of the Legislative Assembly.
2 June 1952	Nominations
28 June 1952	Polling day
21 July 1952	Return of writ

== Result ==
1952 Ashfield by-election Saturday 28 June
Party	Candidate	Votes	%	±%
Labor	Jack Richardson	10,566	52.1	+10.3
Liberal	Ray Watson	9,697	47.9	−10.3
Total formal votes		20,263	98.5	−0.3
Informal votes		308	1.5	+0.3
Turnout		20,571	90.8	−2.5
Labor gain from Liberal		Swing	+10.3	

The retiring member Athol Richardson (Liberal) was not related to Jack Richardson (Labor) who capitalised on their surnames, campaigning on the slogan “Judge Richardson on his merits”.

== See also ==
- Electoral results for the district of Ashfield
- List of New South Wales state by-elections
