= Union, University & Schools Club =

Australian social club

Coordinates: 33.865029°S 151.211089°E

- Type: Mixed gender in the style of a traditional gentlemen's club
- Predecessor: The Union Club 1857; The University Club 1905; Millions Club (later renamed The Sydney Club) 1912; Schools Club 1927
- Founded: 1857
- Headquarters: 25 Bent Street, Sydney (main club-house); 60 Phillip Street, Sydney (health club), Sydney, Australia
- Website: uusc.com.au

Union, University & Schools Club is a private, social club founded in 1857. and based in Sydney at 25 Bent Street. The club was formed by a merger between the Union Club and the University & Schools Club in January 2007. Members must be nominated and seconded and the annual membership fee is only disclosed to potential members. The club has reciprocal relationships with other like minded clubs around the world.

== See also ==
- List of India's gentlemen's clubs
- List of London's gentlemen's clubs
- List of American gentlemen's clubs
