= Rae Desmond Jones =

Australian poet, novelist, and politician (1941–2017)

- Born: 11 August 1941; Broken Hill, New South Wales, Australia
- Died: 27 June 2017 (aged 75)
- Occupations: Poet; novelist; short story writer; politician

Rae Desmond Jones (11 August 1941 – 27 June 2017) was an Australian poet, novelist, short story writer and politician.

Jones was born in the mining town of Broken Hill in the far West of New South Wales. Although many of his poems and stories are concerned with urban experience, he always felt that desert landscapes were central to his language and perception. He wrote in colloquial language, which sometimes exploded in powerful narratives packed with ambiguous sexual and violent imagery, especially in his earlier poems and some of his novels.

He was involved with the Poets Union.

He became a popular mayor of Ashfield, an inner Sydney Municipality, from 2004 to 2006, and during that period held together a broad coalition of Labor Party, Green and Independent representatives. He said that for him "poetry and politics are mutually contradictory, and he finds consolation from each in the arms of the other."

== Bibliography ==
Poetry

- Orpheus With A Tuba, Makar Press, 1973.
- The Mad Vibe, Saturday Centre, 1975.
- Shakti, Makar Press, 1977.
- The Palace of Art, Makar Press, 1981.
- Blow Out, Island Press, 2008.
- Baygone and other poems, Picaro Press, 2011.
- Thirteen Poems from the Dead, Polar Bear Press 2011.
- Decline and Fall, Flying Islands Press, 2011.
- The Selected Your Friendly Fascist, (as editor), Rochford Press, 2012.
- It Comes From All Directions: New and Selected Poems, Grand Parade Poets, 2013.
- The End of the Line, Rochford Press, 2019.

Novels

- The Lemon Tree, Angus & Robertson, 1990.
- Wisdom, Blackwattle Press, 1995.

Short stories

- Walking The Line, Red Press, 1979.

Video/DVD

- Rae Jones: Poet With A Tuba, Vanguard 1985.
