= Frederick Winchcombe =

Australian politician

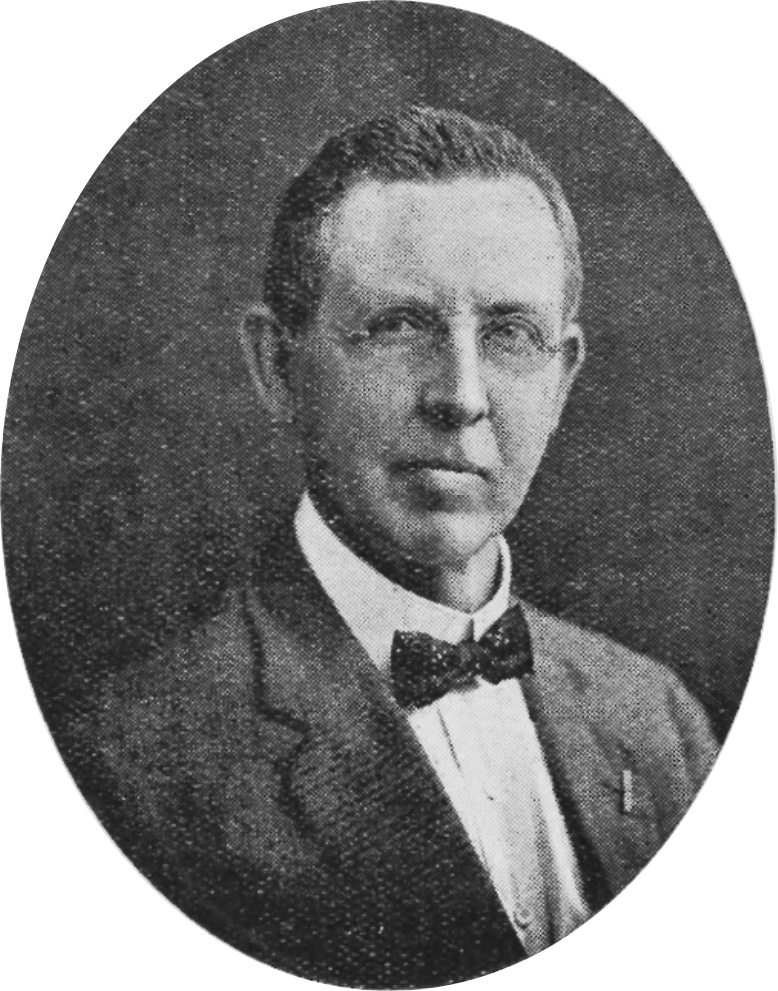
Frederick Winchcombe

Frederick Earle Winchcombe (1855–1917) was an Australian businessman and member of the New South Wales Parliament.

== Early life ==
F. E. Winchcombe was born on 26 April 1855 in Brunswick, Victoria. His parents were John Phillimore Winchcombe, a quarryman who immigrated from Wales, and Julia Sophia Earle. The Welsh Winchcombes were a junior branch of the Gloucestershire clothier family plausibly descended from the 16th century Berkshire clothier Jack O'Newbury.

== Career ==
After graduating, Winchcombe joined the wool brokerage of Mort & Co. In September 1889 Winchcombe formed Winchcombe, Carson & Company with partners Duncan Carson, C. L. Wallis and E. J. Turton. The company served as woolbrokers and cattle agents.

Winchcombe was a commissioner for the 1893 Chicago World's Fair, an executive member of the Patriotic Fund for the South African War and a vice-president of the Royal Agricultural Society of New South Wales. He was three times president of the Sydney Chamber of Commerce (1907–08, 1909–10, 1914–15), a director of the Australian Mutual Provident Society, Atlas Assurance Co. Ltd and James Martin & Co. Ltd, and chairman of Ruthven Ltd, a Queensland pastoral company. He was the first President of the Wildlife Preservation Society of Australia.

At a by-election in November 1900, Winchcombe was elected to the Legislative Assembly for Ashfield. He was re-elected unopposed at the 1901 election, and comfortably retained the seat at the 1904 election. He resigned in August 1905 and traveled to Europe. He was appointed to the Legislative Council in 1907, remaining a member until his death. He was a member of the Board of Health (1907–10).

During the First World War he organized the Sydney Chamber of Commerce War Food Fund, helped to establish the State Wool Committee, founded the Universal Service League (1915). He was a trustee of the Regimental Comforts Fund and vice-president of the Soldiers' Club (1915).

== Personal life ==
He married Annie Amelia Henson (died 1952) at Christ Church St Laurence on 25 September 1878. They had four sons and two daughters. Winchcombe attended St Mark's Church in Darling Point. He was briefly Rector's warden at Christ Church St Laurence (1877–83). His daughter Edyth married Thomas Bavin. His grandchildren included barrister John Winchcombe Bavin, educationalist Nancy Milner-Gulland and writer and theatrical producer Ian Bevan.

== Death ==
During World War I, Winchcombe visited his sons who were soldiers in England. On the return voyage, his ship, hit a mine and sank in the Indian Ocean. Winchcombe was rescued but died of pneumonia on 29 June 1917 in Bombay. He was buried in Sewri cemetery. His estate was valued at £56,109.

New South Wales Legislative Assembly
Preceded by Bernhard Wise	Member for Ashfield; 1900 – 1905	Succeeded by William Robson
