= William Robson (1869–1951) =

Australian politician

William Elliot Veitch Robson (23 March 1869 – 29 June 1951) was an Australian parliamentarian and businessman.

== Early life ==
Robson was born at Surry Hills, the son of the politician William Robson. He attended Newington College (1882–1886) and then the University of Sydney from where he graduated with a BA in 1889. After serving as an articled clerk he was admitted as a solicitor in 1892. His partnerships were Wallace & Robson and Robson & Cowlishaw. Robson married Ettie Gorman Cusack Whyte in 1894 but she died childless in 1899 and two years later he married Mabel Jackson Wise.

== Political career ==
Robson served as an alderman on Ashfield council for ten years from 1898 and was elected mayor in 1899. In August 1905 he was elected to the New South Wales Legislative Assembly as the Liberal member for Ashfield in 1905. He was vocal during the debate on the local government in 1906 and throughout the Newcastle coal dispute of 1909. In 1920 Robson resigned as an MLA and moved to the New South Wales Legislative Council, where he was a member for 31 years.

== Business career ==
- Chairman - Commercial Union Assurance Co. Ltd
- Chairman - R. H. Gordon & Co. Ltd
- Director - Larke, Hoskins, & Co. Ltd
- Director - Larke, Neave and Carter Pty Ltd
- Director - Grenville Motors Pty Ltd

== Church involvement ==
Robson was an active Methodist Church and attended numerous State annual conferences. He was a council-member of Wesley College, University of Sydney and Newington College and a committee-member of the Sydney Central Methodist Mission. From 1924 until 1927 he was a director of the Benevolent Society of New South Wales.

== Private life ==
He was a member of the Australian Club, University Club and Schools Club and in 1902 and 1905 served as President of the Old Newingtonians' Union. Robson was survived by his second wife and their daughter and two sons when he died at home in Rose Bay. His son, Murray Robson, served as Opposition Leader in the NSW Parliament.

New South Wales Legislative Assembly
Preceded by Frederick Winchcombe	Member for Ashfield; 1905–1920	Abolished
