= Jack Richardson (politician) =

Australian politician

Personal details
- Born: 23 September 1921 Ashfield, Sydney, New South Wales, Australia
- Died: 3 June 2011 (aged 89) Sydney, New South Wales, Australia
- Party: Labor Party

Jack Frederick Richardson (23 September 1921 – 3 June 2011) was an Australian politician. He was a member of the New South Wales Legislative Assembly for 6 months in 1952-3 and a member of the Labor Party.

Richardson was born in Ashfield, New South Wales, the son of a railway employee. He was educated at the Law School of the University of Sydney and admitted as a solicitor in 1952. During the Second World War, Richardson served with the Royal Australian Air Force in an anti-aircraft battery between 1941 and 1945.

Richardson was elected to the New South Wales Parliament as the Labor member for Ashfield at the 1952 by-election caused by the resignation of the sitting Liberal member Athol Richardson who had accepted a position as a judge of the Supreme Court of New South Wales. He lost the seat at the state election held in 1953. He did not hold ministerial, parliamentary or party office and retired from public life.

He was a long serving partner in the law firm Heaney Richardson and Heaney, specialising in Family Law, until his retirement.

He married Roma Bezant Conlon in 1956 and she died in 1981. He had an only daughter Ann Frances born in 1958. In 1982 he married Diana, Baroness von Kohorn zu Kornegg. She was the granddaughter of former premier John Storey.

New South Wales Legislative Assembly
Preceded by Athol Richardson	Member for Ashfield; 1952–1953	Succeeded by Richard Murden
