= Richard Murden =

Australian politician (1906–1997)

Personal details
- Born: 22 April 1906 Sydney
- Died: 20 December 1997 (aged 91) Haberfield, New South Wales
- Party: Liberal Party

Richard William Murden AM (22 April 1906 – 20 December 1997) was an Australian politician and a member of the New South Wales Legislative Assembly for two terms from 1953 until 1959. He was a member of the Liberal Party.

Murden was born in Sydney and was the son of a master builder. He was educated at Petersham High School and was initially an apprentice French polisher but lost his job during the depression. He later entered the furniture retail business and owned a furniture shop.

Murden was active in community organizations in the Ashfield area including the Haberfield Progress Association, The Scout Association and the National Trust of Australia. Between 1944 and 1953 and in 1959, Murden was elected as an alderman on the Ashfield Municipal Council and he was the mayor in 1951 and 1952.

Murden was elected to parliament as the Liberal member for Ashfield at the 1953 state election by 122 votes. He defeated the incumbent Labor member Jack Richardson, who had won the seat at a by-election held 8 months before the election. Murden retained the seat at the next election in 1956. The electorate was abolished by a redistribution at the 1959 elections and replaced by the seat of Ashfield-Croydon. This was a nominally safe Liberal seat composed of portions of Ashfield and Croydon and the sitting Liberal members of both seats were endorsed to contest the election. Murden was defeated by Croydon's David Hunter, and he then retired from public life. He did not hold party, parliamentary or ministerial office.

He was made a Member of the Order of Australia in 1975.

New South Wales Legislative Assembly
Preceded by Jack Richardson	Member for Ashfield; 1953–1959	Succeeded by seat abolished
