= Athol Richardson =

Australian politician

The Honourable Athol Richardson OBE, QC
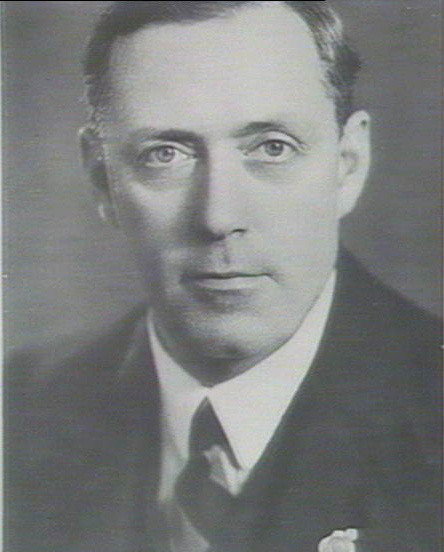

Member of the New South Wales Parliament for Ashfield
- In office 11 May 1935 – 5 February 1952
- Preceded by: Milton Jarvie
- Succeeded by: Jack Richardson

Personal details
- Born: 15 May 1897 Newcastle New South Wales
- Died: 22 May 1982 (aged 85) Darling Point, New South Wales, Australia
- Spouse: Isabel McCrea Watson
- Children: One son, one daughter
- Occupation: Politician/Lawyer

Athol Railton Richardson OBE, QC (15 May 1897 – 22 May 1982) was an Australian politician and judge. Richardson represented the Electoral district of Ashfield for the United Australia Party and the Liberal Party from 11 May 1935 until 5 February 1952.

== Early life ==
Richardson was born to parents Stephen Arthur Richardson, a Salvation Army officer, and mother Elizabeth Sarah Urquhart in Newcastle, New South Wales. Richardson jnr served in World War I in the 2nd and 4th squadrons of the Australian Flying Corps in France from 1917 till 1919. He married Isabel McCrea Watson on 23 February 1928 and had one daughter and one son.

== Political career ==
Richardson entered politics by contesting and winning the Electoral district of Ashfield for the United Australia Party at the 1935 election. He was subsequently re-elected to the seat of Ashfield at the 1938, 1941 and 1944 elections. He resigned to unsuccessfully contest the federal seat of Parkes in 1946. He regained Ashfield at the subsequent by-election and retained it at the 1947 and 1950 elections.

During his time in parliament he held various ministerial portfolio's including Minister for Social Services (13 October 1938 – 5 August 1939), Minister for Health (22 February 1939 – 30 June 1939), Minister for Labour and Industry (26 June 1939 – 5 August 1939) and Treasurer (16 August 1939 – 16 May 1941). He was also Deputy Leader of the Opposition for 1941 until 1945.

Richardson retired from politics upon his appointment as a Judge of the Supreme Court in 1952. During his judicial tenure, Richardson remained a member of the Liberal Party; Tom Hughes describes him as a man of 'orderly habits', but criticises him as 'a well-meaning man who gained marks only for sincerity and effort'. Richardson retired from the bench in 1967.

== Death and honours ==
Richardson died on 22 May 1982, at Darling Point, New South Wales, Australia.

=== Honours received ===
- King's Counsel in 1951.
- Officer Order of the British Empire (OBE) in 1976.
- Hon LLD New York 1968.

New South Wales Legislative Assembly
Preceded by Milton Jarvie	Member for Ashfield; 1938 – 1952	Succeeded by Jack Richardson
Political offices
Preceded by Herbert Hawkins	Minister for Social Services; 1938 – 1939	Succeeded by George Gollan
Preceded by Herbert FitzSimons	Minister for Labour and Industry; 1939	Succeeded by George Gollan
Preceded by Alexander Mair	Treasurer of New South Wales; 1939 – 1941	Succeeded by William McKell
Party political offices
Preceded by Bertram Stevens	Deputy Leader of the United Australia Party; 1941 – 1943	Party disbanded
New political party	Deputy Leader of the New South Wales Liberal Party; 1945 – 1946	Succeeded by Vernon Treatt
