= Electoral district of Ashfield =

Former state electoral district of New South Wales, Australia

Ashfield was an electoral district of the Legislative Assembly in the Australian state of New South Wales, first created in 1894 with the abolition of multi-member electoral districts from part of Canterbury, and named after the Sydney suburb of Ashfield. It was abolished in 1920, with the introduction of proportional representation and absorbed into Western Suburbs. It was recreated in 1927 and, in 1959, it was partly combined with Croydon and renamed Ashfield-Croydon. In 1968, Ashfield-Croydon was replaced by Ashfield, which was abolished again in 1999.

== Members for Ashfield ==
First incarnation (1894–1920)
Member	Party	Term
Thomas Bavister	Free Trade	1894–1898
Bernhard Wise	Protectionist	1898–1900
Frederick Winchcombe	Free Trade	1900–1901
Frederick Winchcombe	Liberal Reform	1901–1905
William Robson	Liberal Reform	1905–1917
William Robson	Nationalist	1917–1920
Second incarnation (1927–1959)
Member	Party	Term
Milton Jarvie	Nationalist	1927–1931
Milton Jarvie	United Australia	1931–1935
Milton Jarvie	Independent	1935–1935
Athol Richardson	United Australia	1935–1943
Athol Richardson	Democratic	1943-1945
Athol Richardson	Liberal	1945–1952
Jack Richardson	Labor	1952–1953
Richard Murden	Liberal	1953–1959
Third incarnation (1968–1999)
Member	Party	Term
David Hunter	Liberal	1968–1976
Paul Whelan	Labor	1976–1999

== Election results ==
1995 New South Wales state election: Ashfield
Party	Candidate	Votes	%	±%
Labor	Paul Whelan	13,902	43.8	−5.4
Liberal	Morris Mansour	7,836	24.7	−8.5
No Aircraft Noise	Michelle Calvert	6,269	19.8	+19.8
Greens	Paul Fitzgerald	2,043	6.4	+6.4
Democrats	John Collins	1,202	3.8	−3.9
Call to Australia	Clay Wilson	482	1.5	−0.2
Total formal votes		31,734	93.5	+8.1
Informal votes		2,222	6.5	−8.1
Turnout		33,956	91.4	
Two-party-preferred result
Labor	Paul Whelan	18,561	65.2	+5.4
Liberal	Morris Mansour	9,895	34.8	−5.4
Labor hold		Swing	+5.4	
