= Electoral results for the district of Clarence =

Election results for Clarence, New South Wales, Australia

Clarence, an electoral district of the Legislative Assembly in the Australian state of New South Wales, has had two incarnations, the first from 1859 to 1920, the second from 1927 to the present.

== Members for Clarence ==
First incarnation (1859–1920)
Election	Member	Party
1859	Clark Irving	None
1860	Clark Irving	None
1863 by	Clark Irving	None
1864	John Laycock	None
1866 by	John Robertson	None
1869	Thomas Bawden	None
1872	Thomas Bawden	None
1874	Thomas Bawden	None
1877	Thomas Bawden	None
1880 by	Charles Fawcett	None
1880	John Purves	None
1882	John Purves	None
1885	John Purves	None
1887	John McFarlane	Protectionist
1889	John McFarlane	Protectionist
1891	John McFarlane	Protectionist
1894	John McFarlane	Protectionist
1898	John McFarlane	Protectionist
1901	John McFarlane	Progressive
1904	John McFarlane	Progressive
1907	John McFarlane	Liberal Reform
1910	John McFarlane	Liberal Reform
1913	John McFarlane	Liberal Reform
1915 by	William Zuill	Liberal Reform
1917	William Zuill	Nationalist
Second incarnation (1927–present)
Election	Member	Party
1927	Alfred Pollack	Country
1930	Alfred Pollack	Country
1931 by	Alfred Henry	Country
1932	Alfred Henry	Country
1935	Alfred Henry	Country
1938	Cecil Wingfield	Country
1941	Cecil Wingfield	Country
1944	Cecil Wingfield	Country
1947	Cecil Wingfield	Country
1950	Cecil Wingfield	Country
1953	Cecil Wingfield	Country
1955 by	Bill Weiley	Country
1956	Bill Weiley	Country
1959	Bill Weiley	Country
1962	Bill Weiley	Country
1965	Bill Weiley	Country
1968	Bill Weiley	Country
1971	Matt Singleton	Country
1973	Matt Singleton	Country
1976	Matt Singleton	Country
1978	Matt Singleton	Country
1981	Don Day	Labor
1984	Ian Causley	National
1988	Ian Causley	National
1991	Ian Causley	National
1995	Ian Causley	National
1996 by	Harry Woods	Labor
1999	Harry Woods	Labor
2003	Steve Cansdell	National
2007	Steve Cansdell	National
2011	Steve Cansdell	National
2011 by	Chris Gulaptis	National
2015	Chris Gulaptis	National
2019	Chris Gulaptis	National
2023	Richie Williamson	National

== Election results ==
=== Elections in the 2020s ===
==== 2023 ====
2023 New South Wales state election: Clarence
Party	Candidate	Votes	%	±%
National	Richie Williamson	24,247	49.6	+3.0
Labor	Leon Ankersmit	10,700	21.9	+0.9
Greens	Greg Clancy	3,739	7.6	−0.3
Legalise Cannabis	Mark Rayner	3,708	7.6	+7.6
Independent	Debrah Novak	3,433	7.0	+7.0
Independent	Nicki Levi	1,320	2.7	+2.7
Sustainable Australia	George Keller	1,061	2.2	+0.6
Independent Indigenous	Brett Duroux	725	1.5	+1.5
Total formal votes		48,933	96.2	−0.5
Informal votes		1,911	3.8	+0.5
Turnout		50,844	88.8	−0.7
Two-party-preferred result
National	Richie Williamson	26,475	64.3	−0.2
Labor	Leon Ankersmit	14,731	35.7	+0.2
National hold		Swing	−0.2	

=== Elections in the 2010s ===
==== 2019 ====
2019 New South Wales state election: Clarence
Party	Candidate	Votes	%	±%
National	Chris Gulaptis	22,965	46.53	−3.91
Labor	Trent Gilbert	10,342	20.95	−7.51
Shooters, Fishers, Farmers	Steve Cansdell	8,308	16.83	+16.83
Greens	Gregory Clancy	3,914	7.93	−1.20
Independent	Debrah Novak	3,038	6.16	+1.49
Sustainable Australia	Thom Kotis	788	1.60	+1.60
Total formal votes		49,355	96.75	−0.13
Informal votes		1,657	3.25	+0.13
Turnout		51,012	89.72	+0.03
Two-party-preferred result
National	Chris Gulaptis	25,985	64.47	+4.79
Labor	Trent Gilbert	14,322	35.53	−4.79
National hold		Swing	+4.79	

==== 2015 ====
2015 New South Wales state election: Clarence
Party	Candidate	Votes	%	±%
National	Chris Gulaptis	23,799	50.4	−13.0
Labor	Trent Gilbert	13,431	28.5	+18.5
Greens	Janet Cavanaugh	4,308	9.1	+2.4
Independent	Debrah Novak	2,202	4.7	+4.7
Christian Democrats	Carol Ordish	1,143	2.4	+0.6
Independent	Bryan Robins	1,041	2.2	+2.2
Independent	Christine Robinson	833	1.8	+1.8
No Land Tax	Joe Lopreiato	427	0.9	+0.9
Total formal votes		47,184	96.9	−0.7
Informal votes		1,520	3.1	+0.7
Turnout		48,704	89.7	+0.4
Two-party-preferred result
National	Chris Gulaptis	25,082	59.7	−22.2
Labor	Trent Gilbert	16,947	40.3	+22.2
National hold		Swing	−22.2	

==== 2011 by-election ====
2011 Clarence by-election Saturday 19 November
Party	Candidate	Votes	%	±%
National	Chris Gulaptis	24,555	56.7	−6.1
Labor	Peter Ellem	12,098	28.0	+17.8
Greens	Janet Cavanaugh	3,099	7.2	+0.3
Outdoor Recreation	Clinton Mead	1,066	2.5	+2.5
Independent	Wade Walker	979	2.3	+2.3
Christian Democrats	Bethany Camac	832	1.9	+0.1
Independent	Kolo Toure	372	0.9	+0.9
Democrats	David Robinson	272	0.6	+0.6
Total formal votes		43,273	97.4	−0.5
Informal votes		1,139	2.6	+0.5
Turnout		44,412	85.0	
Two-party-preferred result
National	Chris Gulaptis	25,512	65.1	−16.3
Labor	Peter Ellem	13,657	34.9	+16.3
National hold		Swing	−16.3	

Steve Cansdell (National) resigned.

The Nationals suffered a 16-point two-party-preferred swing, but since Clarence was already a very safe National seat, Gulaptis retained the seat for the Nationals with a majority of 15 percentage points.

==== 2011 ====
2011 New South Wales state election: Clarence
Party	Candidate	Votes	%	±%
National	Steve Cansdell	28,717	62.8	+9.9
Independent	Richie Williamson	7,789	17.0	+17.0
Labor	Colin Clague	4,683	10.2	−19.8
Greens	Janet Cavanaugh	3,147	6.9	−0.2
Christian Democrats	Bethany Camac	822	1.8	+1.8
Family First	Kristen Bromell	598	1.3	+1.3
Total formal votes		45,756	97.9	−0.1
Informal votes		961	2.1	+0.1
Turnout		46,717	92.8	−0.3
Notional two-party-preferred count
National	Steve Cansdell	31,625	81.4	+19.8
Labor	Colin Clague	7,237	18.6	−19.8
Two-candidate-preferred result
National	Steve Cansdell	30,120	73.3	+11.8
Independent	Richie Williamson	10,963	26.7	+26.7
National hold		Swing	+11.8	

=== Elections in the 2000s ===
==== 2007 ====
2007 New South Wales state election: Clarence
Party	Candidate	Votes	%	±%
National	Steve Cansdell	23,181	52.9	+4.0
Labor	Mark Kingsley	13,148	30.0	−6.9
Independent	Craig Howe	3,274	7.5	+7.5
Greens	Theo Jongen	3,081	7.0	+1.2
Independent	Doug Behn	1,147	2.6	+0.8
Total formal votes		43,831	98.1	−0.2
Informal votes		870	1.9	+0.2
Turnout		44,701	93.1	
Two-party-preferred result
National	Steve Cansdell	24,470	61.6	+6.3
Labor	Mark Kingsley	15,285	38.4	−6.3
National hold		Swing	+6.3	

==== 2003 ====
2003 New South Wales state election: Clarence
Party	Candidate	Votes	%	±%
National	Steve Cansdell	17,683	44.6	+19.2
Labor	Terry Flanagan	15,613	39.3	+2.4
Greens	Mark Purcell	2,627	6.6	+3.2
Independent	Marie Mathew	1,047	2.6	+2.6
Christian Democrats	Brian Hughes	891	2.2	+0.2
Independent	Doug Behn	856	2.2	+0.8
One Nation	Marjorie Burston	711	1.8	−9.0
Democrats	Alec York	257	0.6	−0.7
Total formal votes		39,685	98.2	−0.3
Informal votes		715	1.8	+0.3
Turnout		40,400	92.1	
Two-party-preferred result
National	Steve Cansdell	18,817	51.6	+1.8
Labor	Terry Flanagan	17,644	48.4	−1.8
National gain from Labor		Swing	+1.8	

=== Elections in the 1990s ===
==== 1999 ====
1999 New South Wales state election: Clarence
Party	Candidate	Votes	%	±%
Labor	Harry Woods	14,524	36.9	+2.7
National	Steve Cansdell	10,019	25.4	−24.9
Liberal	Bill Day	7,004	17.8	+17.8
One Nation	Marie Mathew	4,263	10.8	+10.8
Greens	Karen Rooke	1,339	3.4	−0.2
Christian Democrats	John Stanmore	780	2.0	+2.0
Independent	Doug Behn	551	1.4	+1.4
Democrats	Alec York	518	1.3	−1.7
Timbarra Clean Water	Rebecca Tiffen	152	0.4	+0.4
Earthsave	Jeff Milner	151	0.4	+0.4
Independent	Mark McMurtrie	101	0.3	+0.3
Total formal votes		39,402	98.5	
Informal votes		594	1.5	
Turnout		39,996	94.4	
Two-party-preferred result
Labor	Harry Woods	16,467	50.2	+8.5
National	Steve Cansdell	16,324	49.8	−8.5
Labor hold		Swing	+8.5	

==== 1996 by-election ====
1996 Clarence by-election Saturday 25 May
Party	Candidate	Votes	%	±%
Labor	Harry Woods	18,030	51.29	+17.11
National	Geoff Knight	14,662	41.71	−11.32
Democrats	Peter Wrightson	1,415	4.02	+1.00
Greens	Christina Sharman	1,049	2.98	−0.57
Total formal votes		35,156	98.73	+1.78
Informal votes		451	1.27	−1.78
Turnout		35,607	89.20	−5.18
Two-party-preferred result
Labor	Harry Woods	19,280	55.67	+13.96
National	Geoff Knight	15,352	44.33	−13.96
Labor gain from National		Swing	+13.96	

Ian Causley (National) resigned to successfully contest federal seat of Page, defeating Harry Woods.

==== 1995 ====
1995 New South Wales state election: Clarence
Party	Candidate	Votes	%	±%
National	Ian Causley	18,649	53.0	−0.5
Labor	John Lester	12,022	34.2	+5.3
Greens	Daryl Thompson	1,250	3.6	+3.6
Independent	Sally Haig	1,234	3.5	+3.5
Democrats	Peter Wrightson	1,062	3.0	−9.0
The Country Party	Jacqueline Godfrey	952	2.7	+2.7
Total formal votes		35,169	97.0	+2.0
Informal votes		1,105	3.0	−2.0
Turnout		36,274	94.4	
Two-party-preferred result
National	Ian Causley	19,726	58.3	−2.3
Labor	John Lester	14,113	41.7	+2.3
National hold		Swing	−2.3	

==== 1991 ====
1991 New South Wales state election: Clarence
Party	Candidate	Votes	%	±%
National	Ian Causley	16,991	53.5	−11.9
Labor	Olive Boundy	9,173	28.9	−4.6
Democrats	Martin Frohlich	3,828	12.0	+11.2
Independent	John Stanmore	992	3.1	+3.1
Call to Australia	Doug Williams	784	2.5	+2.5
Total formal votes		31,768	95.0	−2.9
Informal votes		1,678	5.0	+2.9
Turnout		33,446	94.1	
Two-party-preferred result
National	Ian Causley	18,304	60.6	−5.4
Labor	Olive Boundy	11,923	39.4	+5.4
National hold		Swing	−5.4	

=== Elections in the 1980s ===
==== 1988 ====
1988 New South Wales state election: Clarence
Party	Candidate	Votes	%	±%
National	Ian Causley	19,842	65.0	+13.8
Labor	William Day	10,681	35.0	−8.3
Total formal votes		30,523	97.8	−1.1
Informal votes		687	2.2	+1.1
Turnout		31,210	94.0	
National hold		Swing	+11.3	

==== 1984 ====
1984 New South Wales state election: Clarence
Party	Candidate	Votes	%	±%
National	Ian Causley	17,765	52.1	+8.7
Labor	Bill Day	14,630	42.9	−13.7
Independent	Denis O'Keeffe	1,703	5.0	+5.0
Total formal votes		34,098	99.0	+0.3
Informal votes		348	1.0	−0.3
Turnout		34,446	93.5	+0.6
Two-party-preferred result
National	Ian Causley		54.3	+10.9
Labor	Bill Day		45.7	−10.9
National gain from Labor		Swing	+10.9	

==== 1981 ====
1981 New South Wales state election: Clarence
Party	Candidate	Votes	%	±%
Labor	Don Day	18,035	56.6	
National Country	William Ralston	13,807	43.4	
Total formal votes		31,842	98.7	
Informal votes		412	1.3	
Turnout		32,254	92.9	
Labor notional hold		Swing	+3.8	

Clarence had become notionally held by Labor due to the redistribution and the sitting member Matt Singleton (National Country), successfully contested Coffs Harbour.

=== Elections in the 1970s ===
==== 1978 ====
1978 New South Wales state election: Clarence
Party	Candidate	Votes	%	±%
National Country	Matt Singleton	15,061	52.5	−11.2
Labor	Danny Signor	8,821	30.7	−5.6
Independent	John Kelly	4,819	16.8	+16.8
Total formal votes		28,701	98.6	−0.1
Informal votes		418	1.4	+0.1
Turnout		29,119	93.3	−0.7
Two-party-preferred result
National Country	Matt Singleton	17,471	60.9	−2.8
Labor	Danny Signor	11,230	39.1	+2.8
National Country hold		Swing	−2.8	

==== 1976 ====
1976 New South Wales state election: Clarence
Party	Candidate	Votes	%	±%
Country	Matt Singleton	16,905	63.7	−0.2
Labor	Colin Clague	9,613	36.3	+7.4
Total formal votes		26,518	98.7	+0.1
Informal votes		346	1.3	−0.1
Turnout		26,864	94.0	−0.4
Country hold		Swing	−4.4	

==== 1973 ====
1973 New South Wales state election: Clarence
Party	Candidate	Votes	%	±%
Country	Matt Singleton	15,236	63.9	+28.8
Labor	Patricia Oakman	6,877	28.9	−7.2
Democratic Labor	William Eckersley	994	4.2	+4.2
Australia	Terrence Hancock	727	3.1	+3.1
Total formal votes		23,834	98.6	
Informal votes		345	1.4	
Turnout		24,179	94.4	
Two-party-preferred result
Country	Matt Singleton	16,230	68.1	+13.0
Labor	Patricia Oakman	7,604	31.9	−13.0
Country hold		Swing	+13.0	

==== 1971 ====
1971 New South Wales state election: Clarence
Party	Candidate	Votes	%	±%
Labor	Thomas Cronin	7,298	36.1	+36.1
Country	Matt Singleton	7,092	35.1	−29.2
Independent	Neville Weiley	2,732	13.5	+13.5
Independent	Clarice McClymont	1,947	9.6	+9.6
Country	Francis Clark	1,127	5.6	+5.6
Total formal votes		20,196	98.0	
Informal votes		408	2.0	
Turnout		20,604	95.3	
Two-party-preferred result
Country	Matt Singleton	11,131	55.1	−9.2
Labor	Thomas Cronin	9,065	44.9	+44.9
Country hold		Swing	−9.2	

=== Elections in the 1960s ===
==== 1968 ====
1968 New South Wales state election: Clarence
Party	Candidate	Votes	%	±%
Country	Bill Weiley	13,470	64.3	−6.2
New Staters	Garry Nehl	7,484	35.7	+35.7
Total formal votes		20,954	98.2	
Informal votes		385	1.8	
Turnout		21,339	96.2	
Country hold		Swing	−6.2	

==== 1965 ====
1965 New South Wales state election: Clarence
Party	Candidate	Votes	%	±%
Country	Bill Weiley	14,502	70.5	+16.7
Labor	Philip Parsonage	6,078	29.5	−13.1
Total formal votes		20,580	98.8	−0.4
Informal votes		250	1.2	+0.4
Turnout		20,830	95.4	−0.1
Country hold		Swing	+14.9	

==== 1962 ====
1962 New South Wales state election: Clarence
Party	Candidate	Votes	%	±%
Country	Bill Weiley	11,121	53.8	−46.2
Labor	William Bailey	8,799	42.6	+42.6
Independent	Garth Munro	758	3.7	+3.7
Total formal votes		20,678	99.2	
Informal votes		175	0.8	
Turnout		20,853	95.5	
Two-party-preferred result
Country	Bill Weiley	11,500	55.6	−44.4
Labor	William Bailey	9,178	44.4	+44.4
Country hold		Swing	N/A	

=== Elections in the 1950s ===
==== 1959 ====
1959 New South Wales state election: Clarence
Party	Candidate	Votes	%	±%
Country	Bill Weiley	unopposed		
Country hold				

==== 1956 ====
1956 New South Wales state election: Clarence
Party	Candidate	Votes	%	±%
Country	Bill Weiley	11,202	64.7	−1.7
Country	Garth Munro	6,124	35.3	+35.3
Total formal votes		17,326	98.2	+0.3
Informal votes		313	1.8	−0.3
Turnout		17,639	93.5	−1.7
Country hold		Swing	N/A	

==== 1955 by-election ====
1955 Clarence by-election Saturday 26 March
Party	Candidate	Votes	%	±%
Country	Bill Weiley	8,805	53.03	
Country	John Moorhead	6,153	37.06	
Country	Garth Munro	1,645	9.91	
Total formal votes		16,603	98.63	
Informal votes		231	1.37	
Turnout		16,834	89.18	
Country hold		Swing	N/A	

Cecil Wingfield (Country) died.

==== 1953 ====
1953 New South Wales state election: Clarence
Party	Candidate	Votes	%	±%
Country	Cecil Wingfield	11,672	66.3	
Labor	George Russell	5,269	30.0	
Communist	Kenneth Harding	650	3.7	
Total formal votes		17,591	97.9	
Informal votes		378	2.1	
Turnout		17,969	95.2	
Two-party-preferred result
Country	Cecil Wingfield	11,962	68.0	
Labor	George Russell	5,629	32.0	
Country hold		Swing		

==== 1950 ====
1950 New South Wales state election: Clarence
Party	Candidate	Votes	%	±%
Country	Cecil Wingfield	unopposed		
Country hold				

=== Elections in the 1940s ===
==== 1947 ====
1947 New South Wales state election: Clarence
Party	Candidate	Votes	%	±%
Country	Cecil Wingfield	unopposed		
Country hold				

==== 1944 ====
1944 New South Wales state election: Clarence
Party	Candidate	Votes	%	±%
Country	Cecil Wingfield	unopposed		
Country hold				

==== 1941 ====
1941 New South Wales state election: Clarence
Party	Candidate	Votes	%	±%
Country	Cecil Wingfield	10,712	75.3	
Independent	John Cain	3,509	24.7	
Total formal votes		14,221	98.2	
Informal votes		266	1.8	
Turnout		14,487	93.7	
Country hold		Swing		

=== Elections in the 1930s ===
==== 1938 ====
1938 New South Wales state election: Clarence
Party	Candidate	Votes	%	±%
Country	Cecil Wingfield	7,754	51.9	+51.9
Country	Alfred Henry	7,194	48.1	−13.2
Total formal votes		14,948	98.3	+1.9
Informal votes		254	1.7	−1.9
Turnout		15,202	95.9	−0.1
Country hold		Swing	N/A	

==== 1935 ====
1935 New South Wales state election: Clarence
Party	Candidate	Votes	%	±%
Country	Alfred Henry	8,641	61.4	−38.6
Country	Bertie Eggins	3,296	23.4	+23.4
Independent	William Robinson	2,147	15.2	+15.2
Total formal votes		14,084	96.4	
Informal votes		528	3.6	
Turnout		14,612	96.0	
Country hold		Swing	N/A	

- Preferences were not distributed.

==== 1932 ====
1932 New South Wales state election: Clarence
Party	Candidate	Votes	%	±%
Country	Alfred Henry	unopposed		
Country hold				

==== 1931 by-election ====
1931 Clarence by-election Saturday 7 March
Party	Candidate	Votes	%	±%
Country	Alfred Henry	5,594	44.99	
Country	William Robinson	3,308	26.60	
Independent Country	John Flaherty	1,196	9.62	
Country	Joseph Reid	1,072	8.62	
Independent Country	Frederick Sargant	814	6.55	
Communist	William Laidlaw	330	2.65	
Independent	Edward Wesala	81	0.65	
Independent Country	Stanley Jones	40	0.32	
Total formal votes		12,435	96.65	
Informal votes		431	3.35	
Turnout		12,866	95.16 (Note: Estimate based on a roll of 13,521 at the 1930 election.)	
After distribution of preferences
Country	Alfred Henry	6,536	52.56	
Country	William Robinson	3,910	31.44	
Independent Country	John Flaherty	1,989	16.00	
Country hold		Swing	N/A	

Alfred Pollack (Country) died.

==== 1930 ====
1930 New South Wales state election: Clarence
Party	Candidate	Votes	%	±%
Country	Alfred Pollack	8,322	64.2	
Labor	Thomas Ledsam	4,638	35.8	
Total formal votes		12,960	98.8	
Informal votes		161	1.2	
Turnout		13,121	97.0	
Country hold		Swing		

=== Elections in the 1920s ===
==== 1927 ====
This section is an excerpt from 1927 New South Wales state election § Clarence

1927 New South Wales state election: Clarence
Party	Candidate	Votes	%	±%
Country	Alfred Pollack	6,563	58.6	
Ind. Nationalist	William Zuill	4,634	41.4	
Total formal votes		11,197	98.7	
Informal votes		144	1.3	
Turnout		11,341	73.0	
Country win		(new seat)		

==== 1920–1927 ====
District abolished

=== Elections in the 1910s ===
==== 1917 ====
This section is an excerpt from 1917 New South Wales state election § Clarence

1917 New South Wales state election: Clarence
Party	Candidate	Votes	%	±%
Nationalist	William Zuill	unopposed		
Nationalist hold				

==== 1915 by-election ====
1915 Clarence state by-election
Party	Candidate	Votes	%	±%
Independent Liberal	William Zuill	2,904	56.69	+56.69
Farmers and Settlers	George Morrison	2,212	43.18	+43.18
Liberal Reform	Thomas Henry (withdrawn)	7	0.14	−72.06
Total formal votes		5,123	98.67	+2.11
Informal votes		69	1.33	−2.11
Turnout		5,192	53.15 (Note: Estimate based on a roll of 9,768 at the 1913 election.)	−8.40
Independent Liberal gain from Liberal Reform		Swing	N/A	

==== 1913 ====
This section is an excerpt from 1913 New South Wales state election § Clarence

1913 New South Wales state election: Clarence
Party	Candidate	Votes	%	±%
Liberal Reform	John McFarlane	4,193	72.2	
Labor	Clem Johnson	1,612	27.8	
Total formal votes		5,805	96.6	
Informal votes		207	3.4	
Turnout		6,012	61.6	
Liberal Reform hold				

==== 1910 ====
This section is an excerpt from 1910 New South Wales state election § The Clarence

1910 New South Wales state election: The Clarence
Party	Candidate	Votes	%	±%
Liberal Reform	John McFarlane	3,586	66.0	
Labour	William Cahill	1,850	34.0	
Total formal votes		5,436	98.2	
Informal votes		100	1.8	
Turnout		5,536	63.5	
Liberal Reform hold				

=== Elections in the 1900s ===
==== 1907 ====
This section is an excerpt from 1907 New South Wales state election § The Clarence

1907 New South Wales state election: The Clarence
Party	Candidate	Votes	%	±%
Liberal Reform	John McFarlane	2,305	73.0	
Independent	Thomas Willan	852	27.0	
Total formal votes		3,157	96.4	
Informal votes		117	3.6	
Turnout		3,274	46.0	
Member changed to Liberal Reform from Progressive				

==== 1904 ====
This section is an excerpt from 1904 New South Wales state election § The Clarence

1904 New South Wales state election: The Clarence
Party	Candidate	Votes	%	±%
Progressive	John McFarlane	2,033	67.7	
Independent Liberal	Duncan Beatson	968	32.3	
Total formal votes		3,001	99.4	
Informal votes		17	0.6	
Turnout		3,018	43.7	
Progressive hold				

The Clarence lost much of the district to Raleigh and absorbed all of Grafton and a part of Raleigh. The Premier Sir John See (Progressive) was the member for Grafton while John McFarlane (Progressive) was the member for The Clarence. The question of the Progressive candidate was resolved when Sir John See decided to retire due to ill health and accepted an appointment to the Legislative Council.

==== 1901 ====
This section is an excerpt from 1901 New South Wales state election § The Clarence

1901 New South Wales state election: The Clarence
Party	Candidate	Votes	%	±%
Progressive	John McFarlane	unopposed		
Progressive hold				

=== Elections in the 1890s ===
==== 1898 ====
This section is an excerpt from 1898 New South Wales colonial election § The Clarence

1898 New South Wales colonial election: The Clarence
Party	Candidate	Votes	%	±%
National Federal	John McFarlane	unopposed		
National Federal hold				

==== 1895 ====
This section is an excerpt from 1895 New South Wales colonial election § The Clarence

1895 New South Wales colonial election: The Clarence
Party	Candidate	Votes	%	±%
Protectionist	John McFarlane	851	65.5	
Ind. Protectionist	Frederick McGuren	449	34.5	
Total formal votes		1,300	99.3	
Informal votes		9	0.7	
Turnout		1,309	71.1	
Protectionist hold				

==== 1894 ====
This section is an excerpt from 1894 New South Wales colonial election § The Clarence

1894 New South Wales colonial election: The Clarence
Party	Candidate	Votes	%	±%
Protectionist	John McFarlane	1,036	71.2	
Ind. Protectionist	Nathaniel Collins	419	28.8	
Total formal votes		1,455	99.0	
Informal votes		15	1.0	
Turnout		1,470	73.5	
Protectionist hold				

==== 1891 ====
This section is an excerpt from 1891 New South Wales colonial election § The Clarence

1891 New South Wales colonial election: The Clarence Friday 19 June
Party	Candidate	Votes	%	±%
Protectionist	John McFarlane (re-elected)	unopposed		
Protectionist hold				

=== Elections in the 1880s ===
==== 1889 ====
This section is an excerpt from 1889 New South Wales colonial election § The Clarence

1889 New South Wales colonial election: The Clarence Monday 28 January
Party	Candidate	Votes	%	±%
Protectionist	John McFarlane (elected)	unopposed		
Protectionist hold				

==== 1887 ====
This section is an excerpt from 1887 New South Wales colonial election § The Clarence

1887 New South Wales colonial election: The Clarence Friday 11 February
Party	Candidate	Votes	%	±%
Protectionist	John McFarlane (elected)	646	55.7	
Free Trade	John Purves (defeated)	513	44.3	
Total formal votes		1,159	98.9	
Informal votes		13	1.1	
Turnout		1,172	60.1	

==== 1885 ====
This section is an excerpt from 1885 New South Wales colonial election § The Clarence

1885 New South Wales colonial election: The Clarence Tuesday 20 October
Candidate	Votes	%
John Purves (re-elected)	719	63.1
Richard Stevenson	254	22.3
Allen Cameron	167	14.7
Total formal votes	1,140	98.3
Informal votes	20	1.7
Turnout	1,160	63.3

==== 1882 ====
This section is an excerpt from 1882 New South Wales colonial election § The Clarence

1882 New South Wales colonial election: The Clarence Tuesday 12 December
Candidate	Votes	%
John Purves (re-elected)	689	70.0
Richard Stevenson	295	30.0
Total formal votes	984	98.9
Informal votes	11	1.1
Turnout	995	60.7

==== 1880 ====
This section is an excerpt from 1880 New South Wales colonial election § The Clarence

1880 New South Wales colonial election: The Clarence Tuesday 23 November
Candidate	Votes	%
John Purves (elected)	unopposed	

The Clarence lost part of the district to Grafton and part to The Richmond. The sitting member Charles Fawcett successfully contested The Richmond.

==== 1880 by-election ====
1880 The Clarence by-election Wednesday 7 April
Candidate	Votes	%
Charles Fawcett (elected)	1,362	42.7
John Purves	1,246	39.1
Samuel Davison	679	18.2
Total formal votes	3,187	98.5
Informal votes	50	1.5
Turnout	3,237	58.3

Thomas Bawden resigned.

=== Elections in the 1870s ===
==== 1877 ====
This section is an excerpt from 1877 New South Wales colonial election § The Clarence

1877 New South Wales colonial election: The Clarence Saturday 3 November
Candidate	Votes	%
Thomas Bawden (re-elected)	1,161	42.2
Charles Fawcett	1,126	41.0
Edward Madgwick	286	10.4
Sir John Robertson	176	6.4
Total formal votes	2,749	98.4
Informal votes	46	1.7
Turnout	2,795	59.7

==== 1874-75 ====
This section is an excerpt from 1874-75 New South Wales colonial election § The Clarence

1874–75 New South Wales colonial election: The Clarence Tuesday 22 December 1874
Candidate	Votes	%
Thomas Bawden (re-elected)	1,090	50.3
Charles Fawcett	833	38.4
Edward Madgwick	245	11.3
Total formal votes	2,168	97.8
Informal votes	50	2.3
Turnout	2,218	51.1

==== 1872 ====
This section is an excerpt from 1872 New South Wales colonial election § The Clarence

1872 New South Wales colonial election: The Clarence Tuesday 5 March
Candidate	Votes	%
Thomas Bawden (re-elected)	835	72.2
Edward Madgwick	322	27.8
Total formal votes	1,157	96.1
Informal votes	47	3.9
Turnout	1,203	31.0

=== Elections in the 1860s ===
==== 1869–70 ====
This section is an excerpt from 1869-70 New South Wales colonial election § The Clarence

1869–70 New South Wales colonial election: The Clarence Tuesday 14 December 1869
Candidate	Votes	%
Thomas Bawden (elected)	unopposed	

==== 1866 by-election ====
1866 The Clarence by-election Monday 27 August
Candidate	Votes	%
John Robertson (elected)	219	57.2
Alexander MacKellar	164	42.8
Total formal votes	383	98.2
Informal votes	7	1.8
Turnout	390	18.3

John Laycock resigned.

==== 1864–65 ====
This section is an excerpt from 1864–65 New South Wales colonial election § The Clarence

1864–65 New South Wales colonial election: The Clarence Thursday 29 December 1864
Candidate	Votes	%
John Laycock (elected)	549	58.7
Richard Bligh	386	41.3
Total formal votes	935	97.4
Informal votes	25	2.6
Turnout	986	48.8

==== 1863 by-election ====
1863 The Clarence by-election Thursday 23 July
Candidate	Votes	%
Clark Irving (elected)	399	73.3
William Campbell	145	26.7
Total formal votes	544	96.6
Informal votes	19	3.4
Turnout	563	33.4

Clark Irving had been absent for an entire session without leave and was in England at the time of his nomination and the election.

==== 1860 ====
This section is an excerpt from 1860 New South Wales colonial election § The Clarence

1860 New South Wales colonial election: The Clarence Friday 14 December
Candidate	Votes	%
Clark Irving (re-elected)	unopposed	

=== Elections in the 1850s ===
==== 1859 ====
This section is an excerpt from 1859 New South Wales colonial election § The Clarence

1859 New South Wales colonial election: The Clarence Tuesday 21 June
Candidate	Votes	%
Clark Irving (elected)	228	45.5
Alexander MacKellar	152	30.3
Edward Ryan	121	24.2
Total formal votes	501	100.0
Informal votes	0	0.0
Turnout	501	53.4
