= Members of the New South Wales Legislative Assembly, 1930–1932 =

Members of the New South Wales Legislative Assembly who served in the 29th parliament held their seats from 1930 to 1932. They were elected at the 1930 state election, and at by-elections. The Nationalist Party was replaced by the United Australia Party in 1931. The Speaker was Frank Burke.

Name	Party	Electorate	Term in office
George Ardill	Nationalist	Yass	1930–1941
Richard Arthur	Nationalist	Mosman	1904–1932
Jack Baddeley	Labor	Cessnock	1922–1949
Richard Ball (Note: Corowa MLA Richard Ball left the United Australia Party and joined the Country Party in April 1932.)	Nationalist/Country	Corowa	1895–1898, 1904–1937
Henry Bate	Nationalist	South Coast	1926–1941
Sir Thomas Bavin	Nationalist	Gordon	1917–1935
Walter Bennett	Nationalist	Gloucester	1889–1902, 1917–1934
George Booth	Labor	Kurri Kurri	1925–1960
Malcolm Brown (Note: Upper Hunter Nationalist MLA William Cameron died on 6 May 1931. Independent Country Party candidate Malcolm Brown won the resulting by-election on 13 June.)	Independent Country	Upper Hunter	1931–1939
Michael Bruxner	Country	Tenterfield	1920–1962
Arthur Budd	Country	Byron	1927–1944
Frank Burke	Labor	Newtown	1917–1944
Walter Butler	Labor	Hurstville	1927–1932
Ernest Buttenshaw	Country	Lachlan	1917–1938
Joseph Byrne	Labor	Parramatta	1930–1932
Joseph Cahill	Labor	Arncliffe	1925–1932, 1935–1959
Robert Cameron	Labor	Waratah	1927–1956
William Cameron	Nationalist	Upper Hunter	1918–1931
Harry Carter	Country	Liverpool Plains	1927–1941
Frank Chaffey	Nationalist	Tamworth	1913–1940
Joseph Clark	Labor	Castlereagh	1920–1927, 1930–1932
William Clementson	Labor	Waverley	1930–1932
Daniel Clyne	Labor	King	1927–1956
Hugh Connell	Labor	Hamilton	1920–1925, 1927–1934
Peter Connolly	Labor	Newcastle	1927–1935
Frank Connors	Labor	Dulwich Hill	1930–1932
Mat Davidson	Labor	Cobar	1918–1949
Billy Davies	Labor	Illawarra	1917–1949
Evan Davies	Labor	Ryde	1930–1932
John Donovan	Labor	Murray	1930–1932
David Drummond	Country	Armidale	1920–1949
Bill Dunn	Labor	Mudgee	1910–1911, 1911–1932, 1935–1950
John Dunningham	Nationalist	Coogee	1928–1938
Bill Ely	Labor	Granville	1920–1922, 1925–1932
Joseph Fitzgerald	Labor	Albury	1920–1927, 1930–1932
Herbert FitzSimons	Nationalist	Lane Cove	1930–1944
William Foster	Nationalist	Vaucluse	1925–1936
Mark Gosling	Labor	Kogarah	1920–1932
Jack Flanagan	Labor	Randwick	1930–1932
Martin Flannery	Labor	Murrumbidgee	1920–1932
William Folster	Labor	Orange	1930–1932
William Hedges	Country	Monaro	1927–1941
Robert Heffron	Labor	Botany	1930–1968
Sir Thomas Henley	Nationalist	Burwood	1904–1935
Alfred Henry (Note: Clarence Country Party MLA Alfred Pollack died on 30 January 1931. Country Party candidate Alfred Henry won the resulting by-election on 7 March.)	Country	Clarence	1931–1938
Ken Hoad	Labor	Cootamundra	1925–1932
Ted Horsington	Labor	Sturt	1922–1947
Ben Howe	Labor	North Sydney	1930–1932
Joseph Jackson	Nationalist	Nepean	1922–1956
Milton Jarvie	Nationalist	Ashfield	1925–1929, 1929–1935
William Keast	Labor	Ashburnham	1930–1932
Tom Keegan	Labor	Glebe	1910–1920, 1921–1935
Gus Kelly	Labor	Bathurst	1925–1932, 1935–1967
Matthew Kilpatrick	Country	Wagga Wagga	1920–1941
Ted Kinsella	Labor	Georges River	1930–1932
Hamilton Knight	Labor	Hartley	1927–1947
Abe Landa	Labor	Bondi	1930–1932, 1941–1965
Joe Lamaro	Labor	Petersham	1927–1932, 1932–1934
Jack Lang	Labor	Auburn	1913–1943, 1943–1946
Carlo Lazzarini	Labor	Marrickville	1917–1952
Sir Daniel Levy	Nationalist	Woollahra	1901–1937
Andrew Lysaght	Labor	Bulli	1925–1933
Hugh Main	Country	Temora	1922–1938
Clarrie Martin	Labor	Young	1927–1930, 1932–1941
Lewis Martin	Nationalist	Oxley	1927–1941
Alfred McClelland	Labor	Dubbo	1920–1927, 1930–1932
Henry McDicken	Labor	Concord	1927–1932
James McGirr	Labor	Bankstown	1922–1952
William McKell	Labor	Redfern	1917–1947
David McLelland	Labor	Drummoyne	1930–1932
William Missingham	Country	Lismore	1922–1933
Mark Morton	Nationalist	Wollondilly	1901–1920, 1922–1938
Barney Olde	Labor	Leichhardt	1927–1932
Walter O'Hearn	Labor	Maitland	1920–1932
Maurice O'Sullivan	Labor	Paddington	1927–1959
Alfred Pollack	Country	Clarence	1927–1931
John Quirk	Labor	Balmain	1917–1938
Bill Ratcliffe	Labor	Barwon	1922–1932
Alfred Reid	Nationalist	Manly	1920–1922, 1925–1945
John Reid	Country	Casino	1930–1953
Edward Sanders	Nationalist	Willoughby	1925–1943
William Scully	Labor	Namoi	1923–1932
James Shand	Nationalist	Hornsby	1926–1944
Tom Shannon	Labor	Phillip	1927–1954
Fred Stanley	Labor	Lakemba	1927–1950
Bertram Stevens	Nationalist	Croydon	1927–1940
Robert Stuart-Robertson (Note: Annandale Labor MLA Robert Stuart-Robertson resigned due to insolvency in April 1931. He won the resulting by-election on 25 April.)	Labor	Annandale	1907–1933
Arthur Tonge	Labor	Canterbury	1927–1932, 1932–1935
Jack Tully	Labor	Goulburn	1930–1932, 1935–1946
Roy Vincent	Country	Raleigh	1922–1953
Bruce Walker Sr	Nationalist	Hawkesbury	1917–1932
Reginald Weaver	Nationalist	Neutral Bay	1917–1925, 1927–1945

== See also ==
- Third Lang ministry
- Results of the 1930 New South Wales state election
- Candidates of the 1930 New South Wales state election
