= 1880 Clarence colonial by-election =

By-election in New South Wales, Australia

A by-election was held for the New South Wales Legislative Assembly electorate of The Clarence on 7 April 1880 following the resignation of Thomas Bawden.

== Dates ==
Date	Event
17 March 1880	Writ of election issued by the Speaker of the Legislative Assembly.
2 April 1880	Nominations
7 April 1880	Polling day
20 April 1880	Return of writ

== Results ==
1880 The Clarence by-election Wednesday 7 April
Candidate	Votes	%
Charles Fawcett (elected)	1,362	42.7
John Purves	1,246	39.1
Samuel Davison	679	18.2
Total formal votes	3,187	98.5
Informal votes	50	1.5
Turnout	3,237	58.3

== See also ==
- Electoral results for the district of Clarence
- List of New South Wales state by-elections
