= Candidates of the 1930 New South Wales state election =

This is a list of candidates for the 1930 New South Wales state election. The election was held on 25 October 1930.

== Retiring Members ==
=== Labor ===
- Michael Burke MLA (Phillip)
- James Smith MLA (Hamilton)

=== Nationalist ===
- John Fitzpatrick MLA (Orange)
- Carl Glasgow MLA (Waverley)
- Walter Wearne MLA (Barwon)

=== Other ===
- H. V. Evatt MLA (Independent Labor, Balmain) — appointed to the High Court

== Legislative Assembly ==
Sitting members are shown in bold text. Successful candidates are highlighted in the relevant colour.

Electorate	Held by	Labor candidate	Coalition candidate	Communist candidate	Other candidates
Albury	Nationalist	Joseph Fitzgerald		William Ford	**John Ross** (Ind)
Annandale	Labor	**Robert Stuart-Robertson**	Lindsay Thompson (Nat)	Mary Lamm	
Armidale	Country	Thomas Wilson	**David Drummond** (CP)		
Arncliffe	New district	**Joseph Cahill**	David Rogers (Nat)	Fred Farrall	
Ashburnham	Nationalist	William Keast	**Edmund Best** (Nat)		David Kelly (Ind CP)
Ashfield	Nationalist	Alfred Paddison	**Milton Jarvie** (Nat)		Alexander Huie (Ind); George Treloar (Aust)
Auburn	Labor	**Jack Lang**	Sidney Massey (Nat)	Herbert Moxon	Harry Meatheringham (Ind)
Balmain	Ind Labor	**John Quirk**	Ernest Hind (Nat)	Jack Sylvester	William Murphy (Ind)
Bankstown	Labor	**James McGirr**	Edward Gill (Nat)	Oliver Griffin	Frederick Willis (Ind)
Barwon	Nationalist	**Bill Ratcliffe**	George McDonald (Nat); Ben Wade (CP)	Colin Smith	
Bathurst	Labor	**Gus Kelly**	Arthur Brown (Nat)	Andrew Goldsmith	
Bondi	Nationalist	Abe Landa	**Harold Jaques** (Nat)		Ashton Kurts (Aust)
Botany	Ind Labor	Bob Heffron		Frank Warner	**Thomas Mutch** (Ind Lab)
Bulli	New district	**Andrew Lysaght**	Edward Holmes (Nat)	Evred Bostick	
Burwood	Nationalist	Francis Miller	**Sir Thomas Henley** (Nat)	Frank Dodds	Stan Lloyd (Aust)
Byron	Country		**Arthur Budd** (CP)		
Canterbury	Labor	**Arthur Tonge**	Arthur Gardiner (Nat)		Ioan Hill (Ind)
Casino	New district	Herbert Young	John Reid (CP)		Frederick Crowther (Ind Lab); John Kelly (Ind Lab); Samuel Sargent (Ind)
Casino	New district	Herbert Young	Malcolm Bulmer (CP); Elsmer Jones (CP); Percy Swanson (CP); Ernest Vincent (CP)		Frederick Crowther (Ind Lab); John Kelly (Ind Lab); Samuel Sargent (Ind)
Castlereagh	Country	Joseph Clark	Robert Stanley (CP)		Frederick Sargant (Ind CP)
Cessnock	Labor	**Jack Baddeley**		Joseph Schelley	
Clarence	Country	Thomas Ledsam	**Alfred Pollack** (CP)		
Cobar	New district	**Mat Davidson**	John Lawson (Nat)	Edmund Rees	
Concord	New district	**Henry McDicken**	Frederick Stewart (Nat)		
Coogee	Nationalist	Mark Cochrane	**John Dunningham** (Nat)		Walter Miller (Ind); Rupert Treatt (Ind)
Cootamundra	Labor	**Ken Hoad**	Bill Ross (CP)	William Beverley	
Corowa	Nationalist	John Metcalfe	**Richard Ball** (Nat)		
Croydon	Nationalist	Cecil Newsome	**Bertram Stevens** (Nat)	Sam Aarons	Raymond Ritchie (Aust)
Drummoyne	Nationalist	David McLelland	**John Lee** (Nat)		
Dubbo	New district	Alfred McClelland	**Harold Thorby** (CP)		Rodolph Purkis (Aust)
Dulwich Hill	Nationalist	Frank Connors	**John Ness** (Nat)	Edna Kavanagh	
George's River	New district	Ted Kinsella	Cecil Monro (Nat)	Pat Drew	Hedley Mallard (Aust)
Glebe	Labor	**Tom Keegan**	Arthur Butterell (Nat)	Herbert Huggett	
Gloucester	Nationalist	Willie Harris	**Walter Bennett** (Nat)		
Gordon	Nationalist	Albert Kitchen	**Thomas Bavin** (Nat)	Esmonde Higgins	
Goulburn	Labor	**Jack Tully**	Joseph Hamlet (Nat)	George Hill	
Granville	Labor	**Bill Ely**	Jack Argent (Nat)		
Hamilton	Labor	**Hugh Connell**	Gordon Skelton (Nat)	Timothy Barry	
Hartley	Labor	**Hamilton Knight**	Alfred Samuels (Nat)	Alfred Airey	
Hawkesbury	Nationalist	William Acason	**Bruce Walker Sr** (Nat)		
Hornsby	Nationalist	George Osborne	**James Shand** (Nat)	Samuel Frew	
Hurstville	Labor	**Walter Butler**	James Webb (Nat)	William Wright	
Illawarra	Labor	**Billy Davies**	William Howarth (Nat)	Joseph Nixon	
King	Labor	**Daniel Clyne**	Ernest Hagon (Nat)	Robert Shayler	
Kogarah	New district	**Mark Gosling**	Humphrey Earl (Nat)	Tom Wright	
Kurri Kurri	Labor	**George Booth**		Harris Burnham	
Lachlan	Country	David Tasker	**Ernest Buttenshaw** (CP)	William Axelby	
Lakemba	Labor	**Fred Stanley**	George Cann (Nat)	Norman Jeffery	James Johnston (Aust)
Lane Cove	Nationalist	Frederick Hutt	**Herbert FitzSimons** (Nat)	George Smith	Henry Macourt (Aust)
Leichhardt	Labor	**Barney Olde**	Thomas Morrow (Nat)	Jane Mountjoy	Arthur Doughty (Ind); Charles Shields (Ind)
Lismore	Country	Jim Fredericks	**William Missingham** (CP)	William Harkin	
Liverpool Plains	Country	Thomas Egan	**Harry Carter** (CP)		
Maitland	Labor	**Walter O'Hearn**	Walter Howarth (Nat)	John Harvey	
Manly	Nationalist	Samuel Bendeich	**Alfred Reid** (Nat)		Vincent Brady (Ind Nat); Charles Gourlay (Aust)
Marrickville	Labor	**Carlo Lazzarini**	Frederick Rushton (Nat)	Francis Wilson	Frank Wright (Aust)
Monaro	Country	Paddy Stokes	**William Hedges** (CP)		
Mosman	Nationalist	Morris Curotta	**Richard Arthur** (Nat)		Phillip Shipway (Ind)
Mudgee	Labor	**Bill Dunn**	Gordon Wilkins (CP)	Patrick Walsh	
Murray	Country	John Donovan	Frederick Grabau (CP); Joe Lawson (CP)		
Murrumbidgee	Labor	**Martin Flannery**	John Kelly (CP)	Arthur Battle	
Namoi	Labor	**William Scully**	William Waterford (CP)		
Nepean	Nationalist	John Freeman	**Joseph Jackson** (Nat)		
Neutral Bay	Nationalist	John Green	**Reginald Weaver** (Nat)		Raymond Sullivan (Aust)
Newcastle	Labor	**Peter Connolly**	Alfred Goninan (Nat)	Jack Simpson	Henry Short (Aust)
Newtown	Labor	**Frank Burke**	William Pickup (Nat)	Jack Kavanagh	
North Sydney	Nationalist	Ben Howe	**Ernest Marks** (Nat)	John Loughran	Thomas Taprell (Ind); Alfred Waterhouse (Ind)
Orange	Nationalist	William Folster	Henry Leggo (Nat)		
Oxley	Nationalist	Alphonsus Ticehurst	**Lewis Martin** (Nat)	John Easton	Patrick Moran (Ind)
Paddington	Labor	**Maurice O'Sullivan**	Charles Robinson (Nat)	Bernard Richardson	
Parramatta	Nationalist	Joseph Byrne	**Herbert Lloyd** (Nat)	Bill Mountjoy	
Petersham	New district	**Joe Lamaro**	Henry Morton (Nat)	Annie Ford	
Phillip	Labor	**Tom Shannon**	William Adkins (Nat)	Edwin Hill	
Raleigh	Country	Charles Booth	**Roy Vincent** (CP)		Theodore McLennan (Ind); Henry Wood (Ind CP)
Randwick	Nationalist	Jack Flanagan	**Ernest Tresidder** (Nat)		Harold Smith (Aust)
Redfern	Labor	**William McKell**	James Correy (Nat)	Jean Thomson-Marsh	
Ryde	Nationalist	Evan Davies	**David Anderson** (Nat)	Basil Williams	William Featherstone (Ind); William Macduff (Aust)
South Coast	Nationalist	Thomas Robertson	**Henry Bate** (Nat)		Willie Hunt (Ind); Edgar Maddrell (Ind)
Sturt	Labor	**Ted Horsington**		Leslie King	
Tamworth	Nationalist	Samuel Scully	**Frank Chaffey** (Nat)	Robert McCall	Francis Brennan (Ind)
Temora	Country	Frank Hawkins	**Hugh Main** (CP)		James King (Ind)
Tenterfield	Country	Alfred Cameron	**Michael Bruxner** (CP)		
Upper Hunter	Nationalist	Albert Burns	**William Cameron** (Nat)	Henry Scanlon	
Vaucluse	Nationalist	Thomas Foster	**William Foster** (Nat)		John Garvan (Aust)
Wagga Wagga	Country	Thomas Lavelle	**Matthew Kilpatrick** (CP)		
Waratah	New district	**Robert Cameron**	Harold Sharp (Nat)	David Martin	
Waverley	Nationalist	William Clementson	**Guy Arkins** (Nat)		George Overhill (Aust)
Willoughby	Nationalist	Francis Burke	**Edward Sanders** (Nat)		John Forsyth (Aust)
Wollondilly	Nationalist	Edward Burns	**Mark Morton** (Nat)		
Woollahra	Nationalist	Thomas Hodge	**Sir Daniel Levy** (Nat)		John Waddell (Aust)
Yass	New district	William Webster	George Ardill (Nat)		
Yass	New district	William Webster	Thomas Collins (CP)		
Young	Country	Clarrie Martin	**Albert Reid** (CP)		Peter Loughlin (Ind)

== See also ==
- Members of the New South Wales Legislative Assembly, 1930–1932
