= 1915 Clarence state by-election =

- 14 August 1915

Electoral district of Clarence in the New South Wales Legislative Assembly
- Registered: 9,768 (Note: Estimate based on a roll of 9,768 at the 1913 election.)
- Turnout: 53.15% (▼8.40)
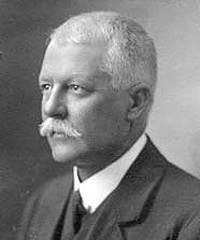
	First party	Second party
		F&S
Candidate	William Zuill	George Morrison
Party	Ind. Liberal	Farmers and Settlers
Popular vote	2,904	2,212
Percentage	56.69%	43.18%
Swing	▲56.69	▲43.18
MP before election
John McFarlane
Liberal Reform
Elected MP
William Zuill
Independent Liberal

The 1915 Clarence state by-election was held on 14 August 1915 to elect the member for Clarence in the New South Wales Legislative Assembly, following the death of Liberal Reform Party MP John McFarlane.

The seat was expected to be retained for Liberal Reform by its candidate, Thomas Henry, but he withdrew during the campaign because he held an office of profit under the Crown. William Zuill, who ran as an Independent Liberal, won the seat with 56.7% of the vote, defeating Farmers and Settlers candidate George Morrison.

== Key events ==
- 9 July 1915 − John McFarlane dies
- 22 July 1915 − Writ of election issued by the Speaker of the Legislative Assembly
- 29 July 1915 − Candidate nominations
- 4 August 1915 − Thomas Henry withdraws as candidate
- 14 August 1915 − Polling day (8am to 7pm)
- 26 August 1915 − Return of writ

== Candidates ==
Party	Candidate	Background
Independent Liberal (Note: Although he was a member of the Farmers and Settlers Association, William Zuill contested the election as an Independent Liberal.)	William Zuill	Auctioneer
Farmers and Settlers	George Morrison	Farmer
Liberal Reform	Thomas Henry	Medical practitioner

Three other candidates mentioned in newspaper reports − Hugh McKinnon, W. R. Baker (unaligned) and T. M. Lobban (Liberal-affiliated) − withdrew prior to the close of candidate nominations and did not appear on the ballot.

=== Farmers and Settlers ===
At the time of the by-election, the Farmers and Settlers Association was in the process of establishing the Progressive Party. George Morrison attempted to receive an official endorsement from the Association, but it chose not to support any candidate. He was still recognised as a Farmers and Settlers candidate and publicly advertised himself as "the farmers' candidate", but was not endorsed by the Progressive Party (although some sources did label him as a Progressive candidate).

=== Labor ===
The Labor Party, which had 27.8% of the vote in Clarence at the 1913 state election, did not contest the seat, although it publicly expressed interest in nominating a candidate.

== Results ==
1915 Clarence state by-election
Party	Candidate	Votes	%	±%
Independent Liberal	William Zuill	2,904	56.69	+56.69
Farmers and Settlers	George Morrison	2,212	43.18	+43.18
Liberal Reform	Thomas Henry (withdrawn)	7	0.14	−72.06
Total formal votes		5,123	98.67	+2.11
Informal votes		69	1.33	−2.11
Turnout		5,192	53.15	−8.40
Independent Liberal gain from Liberal Reform		Swing	N/A	

== See also ==
- Electoral results for the district of Clarence
- List of New South Wales state by-elections
