= Results of the 1930 New South Wales state election =

State election for New South Wales, Australia in October 1930

New South Wales state election, 25 October 1930 Legislative Assembly << 1927–1932 >>
Enrolled voters	1,428,648 (Note: There were 1,440,785 enrolled voters, but 12,137 were enrolled in the Country-held seat of Byron, which was uncontested.)				
Votes cast	1,325,945		Turnout	94.94	+12.4
Informal votes	30,478		Informal	2.25	+0.94
Summary of votes by party
Party	Primary votes	%	Swing	Seats	Change
Labor	729,914	55.05	+12.05	55	+15
Nationalist	404,405	30.50	–7.98	23	–10
Country	126,779	9.56	+0.67	12	–1
Australian	27,493	2.07	+2.07	0	±0
Communist	10,445	0.79	+0.79	0	±0
Independent Labor	7,186	0.54	–2.30	0	–2
Independent Country	3,298	0.25	–0.13	0	±0
Ind. Nationalist	977	0.07	–2.58	0	–2
Independents	15,448	1.17	–1.95	0	±0
Total	1,325,945			90	

The 1930 New South Wales state election was for 90 electoral districts each returning a single member with compulsory preferential voting. The principal change from the 1927 election was the division of the state into 3 zones, Sydney with forty-three districts, Newcastle with five, and the country with forty-two. While the average number of enrolled voters per electorate was 16,009, in the country zone the average was 13,028, (Note: from Cobar (11,936) to Barwon (14,497).), in Newcastle 18,933, (Note: from Cessnock (17,774) to Hamilton (19,710).) and Sydney 18,580. (Note: from Phillip (16,488) to Botany (20,725).)

== Results by electoral district ==
=== Albury ===
1930 New South Wales state election: Albury
Party	Candidate	Votes	%	±%
Labor	Joseph Fitzgerald	5,943	51.7	
Ind. Nationalist	John Ross (defeated)	5,461	47.5	
Communist	William Ford	96	0.8	
Total formal votes		11,500	98.0	
Informal votes		230	2.0	
Turnout		11,730	95.6	
Labor gain from Nationalist		Swing		

John Ross won the seat at the 1927 election as a Nationalist however he resigned from the party before the election, and contested the seat as an Independent Nationalist

=== Annandale ===
1930 New South Wales state election: Annandale
Party	Candidate	Votes	%	±%
Labor	Robert Stuart-Robertson	12,246	77.5	
Nationalist	Osterley Thompson	3,194	20.2	
Communist	Mary Lamm	362	2.3	
Total formal votes		15,802	97.6	
Informal votes		383	2.4	
Turnout		16,185	93.9	
Labor hold		Swing		

=== Armidale ===
1930 New South Wales state election: Armidale
Party	Candidate	Votes	%	±%
Country	David Drummond	6,388	52.1	
Labor	Thomas Wilson	5,872	47.9	
Total formal votes		12,260	97.0	
Informal votes		380	3.0	
Turnout		12,640	99.1	
Country hold		Swing		

=== Arncliffe ===
1930 New South Wales state election: Arncliffe
Party	Candidate	Votes	%	±%
Labor	Joseph Cahill	11,585	66.3	
Nationalist	David Rogers	5,696	32.6	
Communist	Frederick Farrall	204	1.2	
Total formal votes		17,485	97.9	
Informal votes		368	2.1	
Turnout		17,853	95.4	
Labor win		(new seat)		

Joseph Cahill (Labor) was the sitting member for the abolished district of St George which was largely replaced by Arncliffe.

=== Ashburnham ===
1930 New South Wales state election: Ashburnham
Party	Candidate	Votes	%	±%
Labor	William Keast	5,941	49.3	
Nationalist	Edmund Best (defeated)	4,611	38.2	
Independent Country	David Kelly	1,512	12.5	
Total formal votes		12,064	98.5	
Informal votes		179	1.5	
Turnout		12,243	95.1	
Two-party-preferred result
Labor	William Keast	6,084	50.4	
Nationalist	Edmund Best	5,980	49.6	
Labor gain from Nationalist		Swing		

=== Ashfield ===
1930 New South Wales state election: Ashfield
Party	Candidate	Votes	%	±%
Nationalist	Milton Jarvie	6,736	43.0	−15.2
Labor	Alfred Paddison	5,927	37.8	+11.9
Independent	Alexander Huie	1,616	10.3	−5.6
Australian	George Treloar	1,388	8.9	
Total formal votes		15,667	98.3	−0.9
Informal votes		276	1.7	+0.9
Turnout		15,943	93.9	+8.2
Two-party-preferred result
Nationalist	Milton Jarvie	8,592	54.8	
Labor	Alfred Paddison	7,075	45.2	
Nationalist hold		Swing	N/A	

=== Auburn ===
1930 New South Wales state election: Auburn
Party	Candidate	Votes	%	±%
Labor	Jack Lang	13,174	75.8	
Nationalist	Sidney Massey	3,885	22.3	
Communist	Herbert Moxon	198	1.1	
Independent	Harry Meatheringham	126	0.7	
Total formal votes		17,383	97.3	
Informal votes		489	2.7	
Turnout		17,872	95.7	
Labor hold		Swing		

=== Balmain ===
1930 New South Wales state election: Balmain
Party	Candidate	Votes	%	±%
Labor	John Quirk	12,408	76.0	
Nationalist	Ernest Hind	3,243	19.9	
Independent	William Murphy	448	2.7	
Communist	John Sylvester	233	1.4	
Total formal votes		16,332	97.4	
Informal votes		435	2.6	
Turnout		16,767	95.5	
Labor gain from Independent Labor		Swing		

The sitting member H. V. Evatt (Independent Labor) was appointed to the High Court.

=== Bankstown ===
1930 New South Wales state election: Bankstown
Party	Candidate	Votes	%	±%
Labor	James McGirr	12,709	69.3	
Nationalist	Edward Gill	5,286	28.8	
Communist	Oliver Griffin	192	1.1	
Independent	Frederick Wills	145	0.8	
Total formal votes		18,332	96.6	
Informal votes		645	3.4	
Turnout		18,977	96.6	
Labor hold		Swing		

=== Barwon ===
1930 New South Wales state election: Barwon
Party	Candidate	Votes	%	±%
Labor	Bill Ratcliffe	6,719	49.9	
Country	Ben Wade	5,232	38.8	
Nationalist	George McDonald	1,359	10.1	
Communist	Colin Smith	156	1.2	
Total formal votes		13,466	97.7	
Informal votes		319	2.3	
Turnout		13,785	95.1	
Two-party-preferred result
Labor	Bill Ratcliffe	6,984	51.9	
Country	Ben Wade	6,482	48.1	
Labor gain from Nationalist		Swing		

=== Bathurst ===
1930 New South Wales state election: Bathurst
Party	Candidate	Votes	%	±%
Labor	Gus Kelly	7,487	60.2	
Nationalist	Arthur Brown	4,909	39.5	
Communist	Andrew Goldsmith	40	0.3	
Total formal votes		12,436	98.1	
Informal votes		235	1.9	
Turnout		12,671	94.3	
Labor hold		Swing		

=== Bondi ===
1930 New South Wales state election: Bondi
Party	Candidate	Votes	%	±%
Labor	Abe Landa	8,725	47.5	
Nationalist	Harold Jaques (defeated)	7,859	42.8	
Australian	Ashton Kurts	1,795	9.8	
Total formal votes		18,379	98.7	
Informal votes		242	1.3	
Turnout		18,621	92.4	
Two-party-preferred result
Labor	Abe Landa	9,592	52.2	
Nationalist	Harold Jaques	8,787	47.8	
Labor gain from Ind. Nationalist		Swing		

Sitting member Harold Jaques had won the 1927 election as an independent nationalist but rejoined the Nationalist party.

=== Botany ===
1930 New South Wales state election: Botany
Party	Candidate	Votes	%	±%
Labor	Bob Heffron	12,230	63.5	
Independent Labor	Thomas Mutch (defeated)	6,862	35.6	
Communist	Frank Warner	167	0.9	
Total formal votes		19,259	97.6	
Informal votes		469	2.4	
Turnout		19,728	95.2	
Labor gain from Independent Labor		Swing		

Sitting member Thomas Mutch had been expelled from Labor in 1927, but had been re-elected as an Independent Labor candidate.

=== Bulli ===
1930 New South Wales state election: Bulli
Party	Candidate	Votes	%	±%
Labor	Andrew Lysaght	9,170	79.2	
Nationalist	Edward Holmes	2,077	17.9	
Communist	Evred Bostick	331	2.9	
Total formal votes		11,578	98.3	
Informal votes		201	1.7	
Turnout		11,779	94.6	
Labor win		(new seat)		

Andrew Lysaght (Labor) was the sitting member for Illawarra.

=== Burwood ===
1930 New South Wales state election: Burwood
Party	Candidate	Votes	%	±%
Nationalist	Thomas Henley	7,821	44.2	
Labor	Francis Miller	6,937	39.2	
Australian	Stan Lloyd	2,813	15.9	
Communist	Frank Dodds	128	0.7	
Total formal votes		17,699	97.5	
Informal votes		460	2.5	
Turnout		18,159	96.3	
Two-party-preferred result
Nationalist	Thomas Henley	9,183	51.9	
Labor	Francis Miller	8,516	48.1	
Nationalist hold		Swing		

=== Byron ===
1930 New South Wales state election: Byron
Party	Candidate	Votes	%	±%
Country	Arthur Budd	unopposed		
Country hold				

=== Canterbury ===
1930 New South Wales state election: Canterbury
Party	Candidate	Votes	%	±%
Labor	Arthur Tonge	11,827	68.4	
Nationalist	Arthur Gardiner	5,177	29.9	
Independent	Ioan Hill	288	1.7	
Total formal votes		17,292	98.4	
Informal votes		283	1.6	
Turnout		17,575	94.0	
Labor hold		Swing		

=== Casino ===
1930 New South Wales state election: Casino
Party	Candidate	Votes	%	±%
Labor	Herbert Young	3,335	29.2	
Country	John Reid	2,801	24.5	
Country	Elsmer Jones	1,464	12.8	
Country	Percy Swanson	1,363	11.9	
Country	Ernest Vincent	1,006	8.8	
Country	Malcolm Bulmer	790	6.9	
Independent	Samuel Sargent	350	3.1	
Independent Labor	Frederick Crowther	258	2.3	
Independent Labor	John Kelly	66	0.6	
Total formal votes		11,433	93.7	
Informal votes		765	6.3	
Turnout		12,198	95.7	
Two-party-preferred result
Country	John Reid	7,337	64.2	
Labor	Herbert Young	4,096	35.8	
Country win		(new seat)		

The 1929 redistribution increased the number of seats in the rural zone, and Casino was created from parts of Tenterfield and Clarence both of which were held by the Country Party.

=== Castlereagh ===
1930 New South Wales state election: Castlereagh
Party	Candidate	Votes	%	±%
Labor	Joseph Clark	6,901	55.8	
Country	Robert Stanley	5,194	42.0	
Independent Country	Frederick Sargant	264	2.1	
Total formal votes		12,359	97.8	
Informal votes		278	2.2	
Turnout		12,637	94.0	
Labor hold		Swing		

The sitting member was Harold Thorby (Country) who unsuccessfully contested Dubbo.

=== Cessnock ===
1930 New South Wales state election: Cessnock
Party	Candidate	Votes	%	±%
Labor	Jack Baddeley	14,808	92.5	
Communist	Joseph Schelley	1,200	7.5	
Total formal votes		16,008	93.8	
Informal votes		1,058	6.2	
Turnout		17,066		
Labor hold		Swing		

=== Clarence ===
1930 New South Wales state election: Clarence
Party	Candidate	Votes	%	±%
Country	Alfred Pollack	8,322	64.2	
Labor	Thomas Ledsam	4,638	35.8	
Total formal votes		12,960	98.8	
Informal votes		161	1.2	
Turnout		13,121	97.0	
Country hold		Swing		

=== Cobar ===
1930 New South Wales state election: Cobar
Party	Candidate	Votes	%	±%
Labor	Mat Davidson	7,645	72.4	
Nationalist	John Lawson	2,750	26.0	
Communist	Edmund Rees	172	1.6	
Total formal votes		10,567	97.3	
Informal votes		288	2.7	
Turnout		10,855	90.9	
Labor win		(new seat)		

Cobar was a re-created seat, and comprised part of the districts of Sturt, Lachlan and Namoi. Mat Davidson (Labor) was the member for Murray.

=== Concord ===
1930 New South Wales state election: Concord
Party	Candidate	Votes	%	±%
Labor	Henry McDicken	10,702	61.5	
Nationalist	Frederick Stewart	6,708	38.5	
Total formal votes		17,410	99.0	
Informal votes		169	1.0	
Turnout		17,579	97.1	
Labor win		(new seat)		

Concord was a new seat, and comprised part of the district of Ryde and the abolished district of Eastwood. Henry McDicken (Labor) was the member for Ryde.

=== Coogee ===
1930 New South Wales state election: Coogee
Party	Candidate	Votes	%	±%
Nationalist	John Dunningham	9,881	53.4	
Labor	Mark Cochrane	8,429	45.6	
Independent	Rupert Treatt	95	0.5	
Independent	Walter Miller	86	0.5	
Total formal votes		18,491	97.1	
Informal votes		553	2.9	
Turnout		19,044	94.1	
Nationalist hold		Swing		

=== Cootamundra ===
1930 New South Wales state election: Cootamundra
Party	Candidate	Votes	%	±%
Labor	Ken Hoad	6,981	58.5	
Country	Bill Ross	4,866	40.8	
Communist	William Beverley	84	0.7	
Total formal votes		11,931	98.3	
Informal votes		209	1.7	
Turnout		12,140	96.9	
Labor hold		Swing		

=== Corowa ===
1930 New South Wales state election: Corowa
Party	Candidate	Votes	%	±%
Nationalist	Richard Ball	6,750	61.3	
Labor	John Metcalfe	4,268	38.7	
Total formal votes		11,018	98.8	
Informal votes		135	1.2	
Turnout		11,153	93.1	
Nationalist hold		Swing		

=== Croydon ===
1930 New South Wales state election: Croydon
Party	Candidate	Votes	%	±%
Nationalist	Bertram Stevens	8,204	49.6	
Labor	Cecil Newsome	6,564	39.7	
Australian	Raymond Ritchie	1,683	10.2	
Communist	Samuel Aarons	96	0.6	
Total formal votes		16,547	98.1	
Informal votes		323	1.9	
Turnout		16,870	93.3	
Two-party-preferred result
Nationalist	Bertram Stevens	9,006	54.4	
Labor	Cecil Newsome	7,541	45.6	
Nationalist hold		Swing		

=== Drummoyne ===
1930 New South Wales state election: Drummoyne
Party	Candidate	Votes	%	±%
Labor	David McLelland	9,887	56.0	
Nationalist	John Lee (defeated)	7,774	44.0	
Total formal votes		17,661	99.0	
Informal votes		179	1.0	
Turnout		17,840	96.8	
Labor gain from Nationalist		Swing		

=== Dubbo ===
1930 New South Wales state election: Dubbo
Party	Candidate	Votes	%	±%
Labor	Alfred McClelland	6,615	51.0	
Country	Harold Thorby (defeated)	5,943	45.8	
Australian	Rodolph Purkis	412	3.2	
Total formal votes		12,970	98.3	
Informal votes		220	1.7	
Turnout		13,190	94.7	
Labor win		(new seat)		

Dubbo was a re-created district. Harold Thorby (Country) was the sitting member for Castlereagh.

=== Dulwich Hill ===
1930 New South Wales state election: Dulwich Hill
Party	Candidate	Votes	%	±%
Labor	Frank Connors	9,558	51.4	
Nationalist	John Ness (defeated)	8,970	48.2	
Communist	Edna Kavanagh	75	0.4	
Total formal votes		18,603	98.2	
Informal votes		338	1.8	
Turnout		18,941	94.0	
Labor gain from Nationalist		Swing		

=== Georges River ===
1930 New South Wales state election: Georges River
Party	Candidate	Votes	%	±%
Labor	Ted Kinsella	9,668	53.1	
Nationalist	Cecil Monro	6,814	37.4	
Australian	Hedley Mallard	1,569	8.6	
Communist	Patrick Drew	147	0.8	
Total formal votes		18,198	98.2	
Informal votes		333	1.8	
Turnout		18,531	95.8	
Labor win		(new seat)		

=== Glebe ===
1930 New South Wales state election: Glebe
Party	Candidate	Votes	%	±%
Labor	Tom Keegan	11,955	78.6	
Nationalist	Arthur Butterell	3,083	20.3	
Communist	Herbert Huggett	166	1.1	
Total formal votes		15,204	97.8	
Informal votes		345	2.2	
Turnout		15,549	93.6	
Labor hold		Swing		

=== Gloucester ===
1930 New South Wales state election: Gloucester
Party	Candidate	Votes	%	±%
Nationalist	Walter Bennett	8,731	70.7	
Labor	Willie Harris	3,622	29.3	
Total formal votes		12,353	98.6	
Informal votes		178	1.4	
Turnout		12,531	94.4	
Nationalist hold		Swing		

=== Gordon ===
1930 New South Wales state election: Gordon
Party	Candidate	Votes	%	±%
Nationalist	Thomas Bavin	13,951	77.8	
Labor	Albert Kitchen	3,840	21.4	
Communist	Esmonde Higgins	147	0.8	
Total formal votes		17,938	98.2	
Informal votes		323	1.8	
Turnout		18,261	95.5	
Nationalist hold		Swing		

=== Goulburn ===
1930 New South Wales state election: Goulburn
Party	Candidate	Votes	%	±%
Labor	Jack Tully	7,093	60.5	
Nationalist	Joseph Hamlet	4,588	39.2	
Communist	George Hill	35	0.3	
Total formal votes		11,716	98.6	
Informal votes		164	1.4	
Turnout		11,880	95.9	
Labor hold		Swing		

=== Granville ===
1930 New South Wales state election: Granville
Party	Candidate	Votes	%	±%
Labor	Bill Ely	12,495	70.5	
Nationalist	Jack Argent	5,231	29.5	
Total formal votes		17,726	98.7	
Informal votes		225	1.3	
Turnout		17,951	96.7	
Labor hold		Swing		

=== Hamilton ===
1930 New South Wales state election: Hamilton
Party	Candidate	Votes	%	±%
Labor	Hugh Connell	12,860	69.8	
Nationalist	Gordon Skelton	5,231	28.4	
Communist	Timothy Barry	325	1.8	
Total formal votes		18,416	98.0	
Informal votes		374	2.0	
Turnout		18,790	95.3	
Labor hold		Swing		

The sitting member was James Smith (Labor) who did not contest the election. Hugh Connell (Labor) was the sitting member for the abolished district of Kahibah.

=== Hartley ===
1930 New South Wales state election: Hartley
Party	Candidate	Votes	%	±%
Labor	Hamilton Knight	9,797	81.0	
Nationalist	Alfred Samuels	1,904	15.7	
Communist	Alfred Airey	400	3.3	
Total formal votes		12,101	98.4	
Informal votes		201	1.6	
Turnout		12,302	95.3	
Labor hold		Swing		

=== Hawkesbury ===
1930 New South Wales state election: Hawkesbury
Party	Candidate	Votes	%	±%
Nationalist	Bruce Walker Sr	7,846	65.0	
Labor	William Acason	4,216	35.0	
Total formal votes		12,062	98.5	
Informal votes		179	1.5	
Turnout		12,241	96.5	
Nationalist hold		Swing		

=== Hornsby ===
1930 New South Wales state election: Hornsby
Party	Candidate	Votes	%	±%
Nationalist	James Shand	11,168	62.1	
Labor	George Osborne	6,594	36.6	
Communist	Samuel Frew	233	1.3	
Total formal votes		17,995	97.6	
Informal votes		435	2.4	
Turnout		18,430	95.3	
Nationalist hold		Swing		

=== Hurstville ===
1930 New South Wales state election: Hurstville
Party	Candidate	Votes	%	±%
Labor	Walter Butler	11,511	63.2	
Nationalist	James Webb	6,561	36.0	
Communist	William Wright	132	0.7	
Total formal votes		18,204	98.2	
Informal votes		342	1.8	
Turnout		18,546	96.3	
Labor hold		Swing		

=== Illawarra ===
1930 New South Wales state election: Illawarra
Party	Candidate	Votes	%	±%
Labor	Billy Davies	8,944	65.9	
Nationalist	William Howarth	4,405	32.4	
Communist	Joseph Nixon	231	1.7	
Total formal votes		13,580	98.4	
Informal votes		219	1.6	
Turnout		13,799	96.2	
Labor hold		Swing		

The sitting member was Andrew Lysaght (Labor) who successfully contested Bulli. Billy Davies (Labor) was the sitting member for the abolished district of Wollongong.

=== King ===
1930 New South Wales state election: King
Party	Candidate	Votes	%	±%
Labor	Daniel Clyne	10,469	67.2	
Nationalist	Ernest Hagon	4,829	31.0	
Communist	Robert Shayler	277	1.8	
Total formal votes		15,575	96.8	
Informal votes		522	3.2	
Turnout		16,097	87.2	
Labor hold		Swing		

=== Kogarah ===
1930 New South Wales state election: Kogarah
Party	Candidate	Votes	%	±%
Labor	Mark Gosling	12,090	65.1	
Nationalist	Humphrey Earl	6,351	34.2	
Communist	Thomas Wright	145	0.8	
Total formal votes		18,586	98.5	
Informal votes		283	1.5	
Turnout		18,869	96.5	
Labor win		(new seat)		

Mark Gosling (Labor) was the sitting member for the abolished district of Oatley.

=== Kurri Kurri ===
1930 New South Wales state election: Kurri Kurri
Party	Candidate	Votes	%	±%
Labor	George Booth	16,157	95.2	
Communist	Harris Burnham	816	4.8	
Total formal votes		16,973	91.9	
Informal votes		1,488	8.1	
Turnout		18,461	95.8	
Labor hold		Swing		

=== Lachlan ===
1930 New South Wales state election: Lachlan
Party	Candidate	Votes	%	±%
Country	Ernest Buttenshaw	7,444	56.7	
Labor	David Tasker	5,743	41.7	
Communist	William Axelby	212	1.6	
Total formal votes		13,129	98.0	
Informal votes		265	2.0	
Turnout		13,394	94.9	
Country hold		Swing		

=== Lakemba ===
1930 New South Wales state election: Lakemba
Party	Candidate	Votes	%	±%
Labor	Fred Stanley	11,861	68.8	
Nationalist	George Cann	4,517	26.2	
Australian	James Johnston	734	4.3	
Communist	Norman Jeffery	140	0.8	
Total formal votes		17,252	97.1	
Informal votes		512	2.9	
Turnout		17,764	98.8	
Labor hold		Swing		

=== Lane Cove ===
1930 New South Wales state election: Lane Cove
Party	Candidate	Votes	%	±%
Nationalist	Herbert FitzSimons	10,419	58.6	
Labor	Frederick Hutt	5,195	29.2	
Australian	Henry Macourt	2,147	12.1	
Communist	George Smith	32	0.2	
Total formal votes		17,793	98.6	
Informal votes		245	1.4	
Turnout		18,038	95.2	
Nationalist hold		Swing		

=== Leichhardt ===
1930 New South Wales state election: Leichhardt
Party	Candidate	Votes	%	±%
Labor	Barney Olde	12,188	74.9	
Nationalist	Thomas Morrow	3,580	22.0	
Independent	Charles Shields	228	1.4	
Independent	Arthur Doughty	190	1.2	
Communist	Jane Mountjoy	90	0.6	
Total formal votes		16,276	96.7	
Informal votes		551	3.3	
Turnout		16,827	96.3	
Labor hold		Swing		

=== Lismore ===
1930 New South Wales state election: Lismore
Party	Candidate	Votes	%	±%
Country	William Missingham	7,674	63.4	
Labor	Jim Fredericks	4,381	36.2	
Communist	William Harkin	42	0.4	
Total formal votes		12,097	97.9	
Informal votes		265	2.1	
Turnout		12,362	95.2	
Country hold		Swing		

=== Liverpool Plains ===
1930 New South Wales state election: Liverpool Plains
Party	Candidate	Votes	%	±%
Country	Harry Carter	6,013	50.4	
Labor	Thomas Egan	5,920	49.6	
Total formal votes		11,933	98.1	
Informal votes		227	1.9	
Turnout		12,160	95.9	
Country hold		Swing		

=== Maitland ===
1930 New South Wales state election: Maitland
Party	Candidate	Votes	%	±%
Labor	Walter O'Hearn	6,479	53.9	
Nationalist	Walter Howarth	5,499	45.7	
Communist	John Harvey	54	0.5	
Total formal votes		12,032	98.5	
Informal votes		184	1.5	
Turnout		12,216	98.1	
Labor hold		Swing		

=== Manly ===
1930 New South Wales state election: Manly
Party	Candidate	Votes	%	±%
Nationalist	Alfred Reid	9,332	51.5	
Labor	Samuel Bendeich	5,670	31.3	
Australian	Charles Gourlay	2,136	11.8	
Ind. Nationalist	Vincent Brady	977	5.4	
Total formal votes		18,115	98.1	
Informal votes		356	1.9	
Turnout		18,471	95.2	
Nationalist hold		Swing		

=== Marrickville ===
1930 New South Wales state election: Marrickville
Party	Candidate	Votes	%	±%
Labor	Carlo Lazzarini	11,508	65.9	
Nationalist	Frederick Rushton	4,873	27.9	
Australian	Frank Wright	988	5.7	
Communist	Francis Wilson	89	0.5	
Total formal votes		17,458	98.1	
Informal votes		332	1.9	
Turnout		17,790	93.8	
Labor hold		Swing		

=== Monaro ===
1930 New South Wales state election: Monaro
Party	Candidate	Votes	%	±%
Country	William Hedges	6,292	50.5	
Labor	Paddy Stokes	6,156	49.5	
Total formal votes		12,448	98.8	
Informal votes		151	1.2	
Turnout		12,599	97.4	
Country hold		Swing		

=== Mosman ===
1930 New South Wales state election: Mosman
Party	Candidate	Votes	%	±%
Nationalist	Richard Arthur	10,194	63.9	
Labor	Morris Curotta	3,338	20.9	
Independent	Phillip Shipway	2,414	15.1	
Total formal votes		15,946	98.5	
Informal votes		243	1.5	
Turnout		16,189	94.7	
Nationalist hold		Swing		

=== Mudgee ===
1930 New South Wales state election: Mudgee
Party	Candidate	Votes	%	±%
Labor	Bill Dunn	7,538	61.0	
Country	Gordon Wilkins	4,741	38.4	
Communist	Patrick Walsh	76	0.6	
Total formal votes		12,355	99.1	
Informal votes		109	0.9	
Turnout		12,464	96.0	
Labor hold		Swing		

=== Murray ===
1930 New South Wales state election: Murray
Party	Candidate	Votes	%	±%
Labor	John Donovan	5,299	48.9	
Country	Joe Lawson	3,468	32.0	
Country	Frederick Grabau	2,064	19.1	
Total formal votes		10,831	96.5	
Informal votes		395	3.5	
Turnout		11,226	92.6	
Two-party-preferred result
Labor	John Donovan	5,476	50.6	
Country	Joe Lawson	5,355	49.4	
Labor gain from Country		Swing		

The sitting member for Murray, Mat Davidson (Labor) successfully contested Cobar.

=== Murrumbidgee ===
1930 New South Wales state election: Murrumbidgee
Party	Candidate	Votes	%	±%
Labor	Martin Flannery	7,507	56.7	
Country	John Kelly	5,554	42.0	
Communist	Arthur Battle	171	1.3	
Total formal votes		13,232	98.0	
Informal votes		268	2.0	
Turnout		13,500	95.1	
Labor hold		Swing		

=== Namoi ===
1930 New South Wales state election: Namoi
Party	Candidate	Votes	%	±%
Labor	William Scully	7,286	57.3	
Country	William Waterford	5,430	42.7	
Total formal votes		12,716	98.8	
Informal votes		153	1.2	
Turnout		12,869	95.4	
Labor hold		Swing		

=== Nepean ===
1930 New South Wales state election: Nepean
Party	Candidate	Votes	%	±%
Nationalist	Joseph Jackson	7,510	57.7	
Labor	John Freeman	5,501	42.3	
Total formal votes		13,011	98.9	
Informal votes		148	1.1	
Turnout		13,159	95.5	
Nationalist hold		Swing		

=== Neutral Bay ===
1930 New South Wales state election: Neutral Bay
Party	Candidate	Votes	%	±%
Nationalist	Reginald Weaver	10,401	65.4	
Labor	John Green	4,404	27.7	
Australian	Raymond Sullivan	1,095	6.9	
Total formal votes		15,900	98.8	
Informal votes		190	1.2	
Turnout		16,090	93.2	
Nationalist hold		Swing		

=== Newcastle ===
1930 New South Wales state election: Newcastle
Party	Candidate	Votes	%	±%
Labor	Peter Connolly	12,137	69.9	
Nationalist	Alfred Goninan	4,303	24.8	
Australian	Henry Short	742	4.3	
Communist	John Simpson	176	1.0	
Total formal votes		17,358	97.7	
Informal votes		415	2.3	
Turnout		17,773	95.2	
Labor hold		Swing		

=== Newtown ===
1930 New South Wales state election: Newtown
Party	Candidate	Votes	%	±%
Labor	Frank Burke	13,395	83.9	
Nationalist	William Pickup	2,353	14.7	
Communist	Jack Kavanagh	224	1.4	
Total formal votes		15,972	97.7	
Informal votes		372	2.3	
Turnout		16,344	95.2	
Labor hold		Swing		

=== North Sydney ===
1930 New South Wales state election: North Sydney
Party	Candidate	Votes	%	±%
Labor	Ben Howe	8,739	52.1	
Nationalist	Ernest Marks (defeated)	7,696	45.9	
Independent	Alfred Waterhouse	252	1.5	
Communist	John Loughran	45	0.3	
Independent	Thomas Taprell	32	0.2	
Total formal votes		16,764	96.8	
Informal votes		562	3.2	
Turnout		17,326	94.0	
Labor gain from Nationalist		Swing		

=== Orange ===
1930 New South Wales state election: Orange
Party	Candidate	Votes	%	±%
Labor	William Folster	6,894	52.7	
Nationalist	Henry Leggo	6,192	47.3	
Total formal votes		13,086	99.0	
Informal votes		134	1.0	
Turnout		13,220	96.7	
Labor gain from Nationalist		Swing		

=== Oxley ===
1930 New South Wales state election: Oxley
Party	Candidate	Votes	%	±%
Nationalist	Lewis Martin	8,153	64.4	
Labor	Alphonsus Ticehurst	4,107	32.5	
Independent	Patrick Moran	222	1.8	
Communist	John Easton	168	1.3	
Total formal votes		12,650	97.9	
Informal votes		272	2.1	
Turnout		12,922	96.8	
Nationalist hold		Swing		

=== Paddington ===
1930 New South Wales state election: Paddington
Party	Candidate	Votes	%	±%
Labor	Maurice O'Sullivan	12,152	77.6	
Nationalist	Charles Robinson	3,231	20.6	
Communist	Bernard Richardson	272	1.7	
Total formal votes		15,655	97.5	
Informal votes		400	2.5	
Turnout		16,055	91.1	
Labor gain from Nationalist		Swing		

The sitting member was Daniel Levy (Nationalist) who successfully contested Woollahra

=== Parramatta ===
1930 New South Wales state election: Parramatta
Party	Candidate	Votes	%	±%
Labor	Joseph Byrne	10,351	56.2	
Nationalist	Herbert Lloyd (defeated)	7,945	43.2	
Communist	Wilfred Mountjoy	112	0.6	
Total formal votes		18,408	98.0	
Informal votes		379	2.0	
Turnout		18,787	95.6	
Labor gain from Nationalist		Swing		

=== Petersham ===
1930 New South Wales state election: Petersham
Party	Candidate	Votes	%	±%
Labor	Joe Lamaro	10,365	61.4	
Nationalist	Henry Morton	6,367	37.7	
Communist	Annie Ford	138	0.8	
Total formal votes		16,870	98.0	
Informal votes		335	2.0	
Turnout		17,205	93.5	
Labor win		(new seat)		

Joe Lamaro (Labor) was the sitting member for the abolished district of Enmore which was largely replaced by Petersham.

=== Phillip ===
1930 New South Wales state election: Phillip
Party	Candidate	Votes	%	±%
Labor	Tom Shannon	12,152	83.2	
Nationalist	William Adkins	2,167	14.8	
Communist	Edwin Hill	296	2.0	
Total formal votes		14,615	97.4	
Informal votes		397	2.6	
Turnout		15,012	91.1	
Labor hold		Swing		

=== Raleigh ===
1930 New South Wales state election: Raleigh
Party	Candidate	Votes	%	±%
Country	Roy Vincent	7,190	56.0	
Labor	Charles Booth	3,966	30.9	
Independent Country	Henry Wood	1,522	11.8	
Independent	Theodore McLennan	161	1.3	
Total formal votes		12,839	97.7	
Informal votes		302	2.3	
Turnout		13,141	96.1	
Country hold		Swing		

=== Randwick ===
1930 New South Wales state election: Randwick
Party	Candidate	Votes	%	±%
Labor	Jack Flanagan	10,243	57.9	
Nationalist	Ernest Tresidder (defeated)	6,283	35.5	
Australian	Harold Smith	1,169	6.6	
Total formal votes		17,695	98.6	
Informal votes		252	1.4	
Turnout		17,947	91.6	
Labor gain from Nationalist		Swing		

=== Redfern ===
1930 New South Wales state election: Redfern
Party	Candidate	Votes	%	±%
Labor	William McKell	14,676	87.1	
Nationalist	James Correy	1,953	11.6	
Communist	Jean Thomson-Marsh	224	1.3	
Total formal votes		16,853	97.9	
Informal votes		353	2.1	
Turnout		17,206	94.5	
Labor hold		Swing		

=== Ryde ===
1930 New South Wales state election: Ryde
Party	Candidate	Votes	%	±%
Labor	Evan Davies	9,162	50.0	
Nationalist	David Anderson (defeated)	6,410	35.0	
Australian	William Macduff	2,604	14.2	
Communist	Basil Williams	96	0.5	
Independent	William Featherstone	50	0.3	
Total formal votes		18,322	97.3	
Informal votes		513	2.7	
Turnout		18,835	96.2	
Labor gain from Nationalist		Swing		

=== South Coast ===
1930 New South Wales state election: South Coast
Party	Candidate	Votes	%	±%
Nationalist	Henry Bate	7,374	58.6	
Labor	Thomas Robertson	4,285	34.1	
Independent	Edgar Maddrell	833	6.6	
Independent	Willie Hunt	86	0.7	
Total formal votes		12,578	97.1	
Informal votes		378	2.9	
Turnout		12,956	96.1	
Nationalist hold		Swing		

=== Sturt ===
1930 New South Wales state election: Sturt
Party	Candidate	Votes	%	±%
Labor	Ted Horsington	9,349	93.2	
Communist	Leslie King	685	6.8	
Total formal votes		10,034	87.8	
Informal votes		1,394	12.2	
Turnout		11,428	94.4	
Labor hold		Swing		

=== Tamworth ===
1930 New South Wales state election: Tamworth
Party	Candidate	Votes	%	±%
Nationalist	Frank Chaffey	6,720	54.9	
Labor	Samuel Scully	5,296	43.3	
Independent	Francis Brennan	179	1.5	
Communist	Robert McCall	36	0.3	
Total formal votes		12,231	97.9	
Informal votes		265	2.1	
Turnout		12,496	96.4	
Nationalist hold		Swing		

=== Temora ===
1930 New South Wales state election: Temora
Party	Candidate	Votes	%	±%
Country	Hugh Main	5,826	50.6	
Labor	Frank Hawkins	5,360	46.6	
Independent	James King	328	2.8	
Total formal votes		11,514	98.1	
Informal votes		219	1.9	
Turnout		11,733	96.0	
Country hold		Swing		

=== Tenterfield ===
1930 New South Wales state election: Tenterfield
Party	Candidate	Votes	%	±%
Country	Michael Bruxner	7,161	59.3	
Labor	Alfred Cameron	4,908	40.7	
Total formal votes		12,069	98.7	
Informal votes		161	1.3	
Turnout		12,230	96.4	
Country hold		Swing		

=== Upper Hunter ===
1930 New South Wales state election: Upper Hunter
Party	Candidate	Votes	%	±%
Nationalist	William Cameron	7,052	56.3	
Labor	Albert Burns	5,383	43.0	
Communist	Henry Scanlon	96	0.8	
Total formal votes		12,531	96.8	
Informal votes		417	3.2	
Turnout		12,948	98.1	
Nationalist hold		Swing		

=== Vaucluse ===
1930 New South Wales state election: Vaucluse
Party	Candidate	Votes	%	±%
Nationalist	William Foster	12,107	70.3	
Labor	Thomas Foster	3,341	19.4	
Australian	John Garvan	1,780	10.3	
Total formal votes		17,228	98.3	
Informal votes		290	1.7	
Turnout		17,518	92.2	
Nationalist hold		Swing		

=== Wagga Wagga ===
1930 New South Wales state election: Wagga Wagga
Party	Candidate	Votes	%	±%
Country	Matthew Kilpatrick	6,571	56.4	
Labor	Thomas Lavelle	5,077	43.6	
Total formal votes		11,648	98.9	
Informal votes		132	1.1	
Turnout		11,780	95.1	
Country hold		Swing		

=== Waratah ===
1930 New South Wales state election: Waratah
Party	Candidate	Votes	%	±%
Labor	Robert Cameron	13,890	77.1	
Nationalist	Harold Sharp	3,936	21.9	
Communist	David Martin	183	1.0	
Total formal votes		18,009	98.0	
Informal votes		369	2.0	
Turnout		18,378	95.5	
Labor win		(new seat)		

Robert Cameron (Labor) was the sitting member for the abolished district of Wallsend which was partly replaced by Waratah.

=== Waverley ===
1930 New South Wales state election: Waverley
Party	Candidate	Votes	%	±%
Labor	William Clementson	9,994	57.5	
Nationalist	Guy Arkins (defeated)	6,487	37.3	
Australian	George Overhill	901	5.2	
Total formal votes		17,382	96.8	
Informal votes		578	3.2	
Turnout		17,960	93.3	
Labor gain from Nationalist		Swing		

Guy Arkins (Nationalist) was the sitting member for the abolished district of Rockdale.

=== Willoughby ===
1930 New South Wales state election: Willoughby
Party	Candidate	Votes	%	±%
Nationalist	Edward Sanders	8,072	48.4	
Labor	Francis Burke	6,604	39.6	
Australian	John Forsyth	2,017	12.1	
Total formal votes		16,693	98.9	
Informal votes		182	1.1	
Turnout		16,875	95.8	
Two-party-preferred result
Nationalist	Edward Sanders	9,158	54.9	
Labor	Francis Burke	7,535	45.1	
Member changed to Nationalist from Ind. Nationalist		Swing		

=== Wollondilly ===
1930 New South Wales state election: Wollondilly
Party	Candidate	Votes	%	±%
Nationalist	Mark Morton	7,215	56.3	
Labor	Edward Burns	5,601	43.7	
Total formal votes		12,816	98.5	
Informal votes		190	1.5	
Turnout		13,006	95.9	
Nationalist hold		Swing		

=== Woollahra ===
1930 New South Wales state election: Woollahra
Party	Candidate	Votes	%	±%
Nationalist	Daniel Levy	9,185	59.1	
Labor	Thomas Hodge	4,847	31.2	
Australian	John Waddell	1,520	9.8	
Total formal votes		15,552	97.7	
Informal votes		364	2.3	
Turnout		15,916	87.1	
Nationalist hold		Swing		

=== Yass ===
1930 New South Wales state election: Yass
Party	Candidate	Votes	%	±%
Labor	William Webster	5,368	46.3	
Nationalist	George Ardill	3,296	28.4	
Country	Thomas Collins	2,942	25.3	
Total formal votes		11,606	98.2	
Informal votes		208	1.8	
Turnout		11,814	96.2	
Two-party-preferred result
Nationalist	George Ardill	5,876	50.6	
Labor	William Webster	5,730	49.4	
Nationalist win		(new seat)		

=== Young ===
1930 New South Wales state election: Young
Party	Candidate	Votes	%	±%
Labor	Clarrie Martin	6,026	46.6	
Country	Albert Reid (defeated)	5,040	39.0	
Independent	Peter Loughlin	1,858	14.4	
Total formal votes		12,924	98.7	
Informal votes		170	1.3	
Turnout		13,094	95.6	
Two-party-preferred result
Labor	Clarrie Martin	6,869	53.2	
Country	Albert Reid	6,055	46.8	
Labor gain from Country		Swing		

== See also ==
- Candidates of the 1930 New South Wales state election
- Members of the New South Wales Legislative Assembly, 1930–1932
