= 2011 Clarence state by-election =

- 19 November 2011

	First party	Second party
Candidate	Chris Gulaptis	Peter Ellem
Party	National	Labor
Popular vote	24,555	12,098
Percentage	56.7%	28.0%
Swing	▼6.1	▲17.8
TPP	65.1%	34.9%
TPP swing	▼16.3	▲16.3
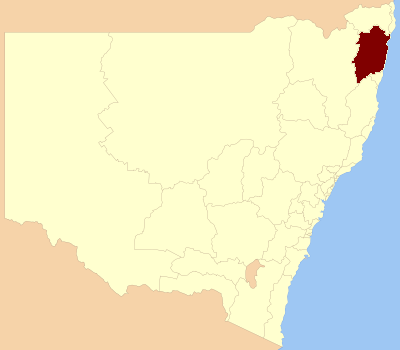
- The location of the seat of Clarence in New South Wales
MP before election
Steve Cansdell
National
Elected MP
Chris Gulaptis
National

A by-election was held for the New South Wales Legislative Assembly electorate of Clarence on 19 November 2011, following the resignation from parliament on 16 September of Steve Cansdell (National). Despite a large two-party-preferred swing, Nationals candidate Chris Gulaptis retained the seat.

== Background ==
Steve Cansdell resigned from parliament after admitting to making a false statutory declaration regarding a speeding offence. Eight candidates contested the by-election including Nationals candidate Chris Gulaptis who previously contested the federal seat of Page at the 2007 federal election, and Labor candidate Peter Ellem. One of the main issues of the campaign was coal seam gas (CSG) production. Labor accused the Coalition government of putting the environment at risk by not ruling out future CSG, while resources minister Chris Hartcher claimed that "Every CSG licence that exists in NSW was granted by the Labor government of which John Robertson was a minister". Other issues in the campaign were more local, with candidates jousting over ways to create more jobs in Grafton and reduce crime in Casino.

== Results ==
2011 Clarence by-election Saturday 19 November
Party	Candidate	Votes	%	±%
National	Chris Gulaptis	24,555	56.7	−6.1
Labor	Peter Ellem	12,098	28.0	+17.8
Greens	Janet Cavanaugh	3,099	7.2	+0.3
Outdoor Recreation	Clinton Mead	1,066	2.5	+2.5
Independent	Wade Walker	979	2.3	+2.3
Christian Democrats	Bethany Camac	832	1.9	+0.1
Independent	Kolo Toure	372	0.9	+0.9
Democrats	David Robinson	272	0.6	+0.6
Total formal votes		43,273	97.4	−0.5
Informal votes		1,139	2.6	+0.5
Turnout		44,412	85.0	
Two-party-preferred result
National	Chris Gulaptis	25,512	65.1	−16.3
Labor	Peter Ellem	13,657	34.9	+16.3
National hold		Swing	−16.3	

The Nationals suffered a 16-point two-party-preferred swing, but since Clarence was already a very safe National seat, Gulaptis retained the seat for the Nationals with a majority of 15 percentage points.

== See also ==
- Electoral results for the district of Clarence
- List of New South Wales state by-elections
