= 1931 Clarence state by-election =

Election result for Clarence, New South Wales, Australia

A by-election was held for the New South Wales Legislative Assembly electorate of Clarence on 7 March 1931 following the death of Alfred Pollack (Country). There were three candidates endorsed by the Country Party

== Results ==
1931 Clarence by-election Saturday 7 March
Party	Candidate	Votes	%	±%
Country	Alfred Henry	5,594	44.99	
Country	William Robinson	3,308	26.60	
Independent Country	John Flaherty	1,196	9.62	
Country	Joseph Reid	1,072	8.62	
Independent Country	Frederick Sargant	814	6.55	
Communist	William Laidlaw	330	2.65	
Independent	Edward Wesala	81	0.65	
Independent Country	Stanley Jones	40	0.32	
Total formal votes		12,435	96.65	
Informal votes		431	3.35	
Turnout		12,866	95.16 (Note: Estimate based on a roll of 13,521 at the 1930 election.)	
After distribution of preferences
Country	Alfred Henry	6,536	52.56	
Country	William Robinson	3,910	31.44	
Independent Country	John Flaherty	1,989	16.00	
Country hold		Swing	N/A	

== See also ==
- Electoral results for the district of Clarence
- List of New South Wales state by-elections
