= 1955 Clarence state by-election =

Election result for Clarence, New South Wales, Australia

A by-election was held for the New South Wales Legislative Assembly electorate of Clarence on 26 March 1955 following the death of Cecil Wingfield (Country). All three candidates were endorsed by the Country Party

== Dates ==
| Date | Event |
|---|---|
| 28 January 1955 | Cecil Wingfield died. |
| 2 March 1955 | Writ of election issued by the Speaker of the Legislative Assembly. |
| 7 March 1955 | Day of nomination |
| 26 March 1955 | Polling day |
| 22 April 1955 | Return of writ |

== Results ==
1955 Clarence by-election Saturday 26 March
| Party | Candidate | Votes | % | ±% |
|---|---|---|---|---|
| Country | Bill Weiley | 8,805 | 53.03 | |
| Country | John Moorhead | 6,153 | 37.06 | |
| Country | Garth Munro | 1,645 | 9.91 | |
| Total formal votes | | 16,603 | 98.63 | |
| Informal votes | | 231 | 1.37 | |
| Turnout | | 16,834 | 89.18 | |
| Country hold | | Swing | N/A | |

== See also ==
- Electoral results for the district of Clarence
- List of New South Wales state by-elections
