= 1996 Clarence state by-election =

Election result for Clarence, New South Wales, Australia

A by-election was held for the New South Wales Legislative Assembly electorate of Clarence on 25 May 1996 following the resignation of sitting member, Ian Causley (National), to contest federal seat of Page at the 1996 election.

On the same day, by-elections were held in the seats of Orange, Pittwater, Southern Highlands and Strathfield.

All seats were retained by the Liberal-National Parties, with the exception of Clarence, that was won by the Labor Party with a swing on a two-party preferred basis of 13.96%. The successful ALP candidate was Harry Woods who was the sitting member for the federal seat of Page when he was defeated at the 1996 federal election by Ian Causley, ironically the previous member for Clarence.

== Results ==
1996 Clarence by-election Saturday 25 May
Party	Candidate	Votes	%	±%
Labor	Harry Woods	18,030	51.29	+17.11
National	Geoff Knight	14,662	41.71	−11.32
Democrats	Peter Wrightson	1,415	4.02	+1.00
Greens	Christina Sharman	1,049	2.98	−0.57
Total formal votes		35,156	98.73	+1.78
Informal votes		451	1.27	−1.78
Turnout		35,607	89.20	−5.18
Two-party-preferred result
Labor	Harry Woods	19,280	55.67	+13.96
National	Geoff Knight	15,352	44.33	−13.96
Labor gain from National		Swing	+13.96	

== See also ==
- Electoral results for the district of Clarence
- List of New South Wales state by-elections
