= Richie Williamson =

Australian politician

Richie Williamson MP

Member of the New South Wales Assembly for Clarence
- Incumbent
- Assumed office 25 March 2023
- Preceded by: Chris Gulaptis

Personal details
- Born: 1973 (age 52–53) Grafton, New South Wales, Australia
- Party: National Party
- Other political affiliations: Independent

Richard James Williamson (born 1973) is an Australian politician. He was elected a member of the New South Wales Legislative Assembly representing Clarence for the National Party in 2023.

== Early life ==
Williamson grew up in a village south of Grafton.

Prior to politics, he worked at local radio station 2GF.

== Political career ==
Williamson was Mayor of Clarence Valley Council from 2008 to 2016. He stood as an independent candidate in Clarence at the 2011 New South Wales state election but was defeated in the second round by National party candidate Steve Cansdell.

== Electoral record ==
2023 New South Wales state election: Clarence
Party	Candidate	Votes	%	±%
National	Richie Williamson	24,247	49.6	+3.0
Labor	Leon Ankersmit	10,700	21.9	+0.9
Greens	Greg Clancy	3,739	7.6	−0.3
Legalise Cannabis	Mark Rayner	3,708	7.6	+7.6
Independent	Debrah Novak	3,433	7.0	+7.0
Independent	Nicki Levi	1,320	2.7	+2.7
Sustainable Australia	George Keller	1,061	2.2	+0.6
Independent Indigenous	Brett Duroux	725	1.5	+1.5
Total formal votes		48,933	96.2	−0.5
Informal votes		1,911	3.8	+0.5
Turnout		50,844	88.8	−0.7
Two-party-preferred result
National	Richie Williamson	26,475	64.3	−0.2
Labor	Leon Ankersmit	14,731	35.7	+0.2
National hold		Swing	−0.2	

2011 New South Wales state election: Clarence
Party	Candidate	Votes	%	±%
National	Steve Cansdell	28,717	62.8	+9.9
Independent	Richie Williamson	7,789	17.0	+17.0
Labor	Colin Clague	4,683	10.2	−19.8
Greens	Janet Cavanaugh	3,147	6.9	−0.2
Christian Democrats	Bethany Camac	822	1.8	+1.8
Family First	Kristen Bromell	598	1.3	+1.3
Total formal votes		45,756	97.9	−0.1
Informal votes		961	2.1	+0.1
Turnout		46,717	92.8	−0.3
Notional two-party-preferred count
National	Steve Cansdell	31,625	81.4	+19.8
Labor	Colin Clague	7,237	18.6	−19.8
Two-candidate-preferred result
National	Steve Cansdell	30,120	73.3	+11.8
Independent	Richie Williamson	10,963	26.7	+26.7
National hold		Swing	+11.8	

New South Wales Legislative Assembly
Preceded by Chris Gulaptis	Member for Clarence; 2023–present	Incumbent
