= Tom Wright (trade unionist) =

Thomas Wright (25 February 1902 – 10 January 1981) was a Scottish-born Australian trade unionist.

He was born at Bridgend in Kinross, Scotland, to coalminer John Easton Wright and Kathleen Florence, née Jessop. The family moved to Sydney in 1911, living in Redfern and Hurstville. Tom left school at the age of thirteen and became a sheet-metal worker at Wunderlich Ltd, coming under the influence of socialist Paddy Drew, later a founder of the Communist Party of Australia. He joined the Sheet Metal Working Industrial Union of Australia in 1921 and in 1924 became a member of the state management committee, treasurer of the New South Wales branch, and a delegate to the Labor Council of New South Wales (1924–1973). He joined the Australian Labor Party and became secretary of the Hurstville branch, but after joining the Communist Party of Australia in 1923 he was expelled from the ALP in 1925. The Bruce–Page government barred him from attending the 1927 Pan-Pacific Trade Union Congress in China, but he went instead to Moscow to a meeting with the Comintern.

Within the CPA, he supported Jack Kavanagh's faction, becoming general secretary of the CPA in 1925. Kavanagh's fall in 1929 saw him lose this position, although he escaped expulsion. He recanted his previous loyalties and was restored to the central committee in 1931, remaining a member until 1970. He met Mary Margaret Lamm, née McAdam, at the Unemployed Workers' Movement in Glebe; she was widowed in 1931 and she lived with Wright for a decade before they were married on 23 January 1941 at Five Dock. He increasingly worked as a communist organiser with the unemployed and stood several times as a Communist candidate for state and federal parliament.

In 1936 Wright was elected state secretary of the sheet-metal workers' union, and in 1937 became vice-president of the Labor Council of New South Wales. In 1940 he became federal president of the sheet-metal workers' union, and played a leading role in the amalgamation with the Sheet Metal Working Agricultural Implement and Stove Making Industrial Union, serving as federal president of that body. From 1973 it became known as the Amalgamated Metal Workers' Union; Wright was again state president from 1972 to 1973 and commonwealth vice-president from 1972 to 1974. He was a long-term delegate to the Australian Council of Trade Unions, having been involved in its foundation, and sat on the executive from 1939 to 1941 and from 1961 to 1965.

Wright was key in persuading the Communist Party to support Aboriginal land rights, and he published a book, New Deal for the Aborigines, in 1939. His attacks on Catholic mission policy were replied to by Bishop Gsell. He was involved in the campaigns for civil liberties in the 1930s and peace in the 1940s and 1950s, and supported equal pay for women. After criticising the conciliation commissioners during the 1949 coal strike he faced, but escaped, prosecution, and in 1953 he was elected to Sydney City Council as one of the first two communists (with Ron Maxwell) to sit on that body. Later, in 1959, he was defeated after the elimination of proportional representation. He visited China in 1952 and Cuba in 1963.

Both Wright and his wife left the Communist Party in 1970 after it distanced itself from the Soviet Union. Mary joined the Socialist Party of Australia, while Tom remained aloof from politics thereafter. Among his publications were We Defend Peace (1937), A Real Social Insurance Plan (1937), Lenin and the Trade Unions (1940), The Basic Wage (1943), World Trade Union Federation (1945), United Action Wins (1947), and Australians Visit People's China (1952). He died at Kogarah in 1981, and was survived by his wife and their son.

Party political offices
Preceded by Carl Baker	General Secretary of the Communist Party of Australia; 1925–1929	Succeeded by Herbert Moxon
