= 1866 Clarence colonial by-election =

By-election in New South Wales, Australia

A by-election was held for the New South Wales Legislative Assembly electorate of the Clarence on 27 August 1866 following the resignation of John Laycock.

== Dates ==
Date	Event
1 August 1866	Writ of election issued by the Speaker of the Legislative Assembly and close of electoral rolls.
20 August 1866	Nominations
27 August 1866	Polling day, between the hours of 8 am and 6 pm
10 September 1866	Return of writ

== Candidates ==
- John Robertson had been appointed Secretary for Lands but had been defeated at the resulting 1866 West Sydney by-election.
- Alexander MacKellar had been the second placed candidate at the 1859 election for The Clarence receiving 30.3% of the vote.

== Results ==
1866 The Clarence by-election Monday 27 August
Candidate	Votes	%
John Robertson (elected)	219	57.2
Alexander MacKellar	164	42.8
Total formal votes	383	98.2
Informal votes	7	1.8
Turnout	390	18.3

== See also ==
- Electoral results for the district of Clarence
- List of New South Wales state by-elections
