= Harry Woods (Australian politician) =

Australian politician

The Honourable Harry Woods

Member of the Australian Parliament for Page
- In office 24 March 1990 – 2 March 1996
- Preceded by: Ian Robinson
- Succeeded by: Ian Causley

Member of the New South Wales Parliament for Clarence
- In office 25 May 1996 – 28 March 2003
- Preceded by: Ian Causley
- Succeeded by: Steve Cansdell

Personal details
- Born: 23 December 1947 (age 78) Darlinghurst, New South Wales, Australia
- Party: Australian Labor Party
- Education: St Ignatius' College, Riverview; Christian Brothers' High School, Lewisham
- Occupation: Businessman

Harry Francis Woods (born 23 December 1947) is a former Australian politician. He was a member of the House of Representatives from 1990 to 1996, representing the seat of Page for the Australian Labor Party (ALP). He subsequently entered state politics, serving in the New South Wales Legislative Assembly from 1996 to 2003 and holding ministerial office in the government of Bob Carr.

== Early life ==
Woods was born on 23 December 1947 in Darlinghurst, New South Wales. He was educated at St Ignatius' College, Riverview, and Christian Brothers' High School, Lewisham.

Prior to entering politics, Woods worked for periods as a truck driver, taxi driver, publican and bookmaker. He owned "a number of pubs, a newsagency and a bookmaking business".

== Federal politics ==
Woods was elected to the House of Representatives at the 1990 federal election, winning the seat of Page for the Australian Labor Party (ALP) from the incumbent National MP Ian Robinson. Environmental matters were a significant issue in the campaign, with Woods "campaigning hard against a proposed pulp mill, arguing that it would harm the Clarence River".

During the leadership tension between Bob Hawke and Paul Keating, Woods was initially a Hawke supporter but switched his support to Keating prior to the second leadership ballot in December 1991. He was elected as chair of the ALP caucus's primary industry and resources committee, where he served as a spokesman for other rural and regional MPs. In 1993 he publicly criticised the Industry Commission's recommendations for Australia Post to close country post offices. He also attracted attention in 1994 by publicly opposing environment minister David Beddall's decision to approve the expansion of the woodchipping industry on the North Coast.

Woods narrowly retained his seat at the 1993 election, despite the Forest Products Association and other logging industry bodies actively campaigning against him for his anti-woodchipping stance. He was left with a 0.3 percent margin, with Greens preferences crucial in his re-election and the re-election of his ALP colleague Neville Newell in the neighbouring seat of Richmond. He lost his seat to Ian Causley of the National Party at the 1996 election in the nationwide swing to the Coalition.

== State politics ==
Woods was elected as the member for Clarence in the New South Wales Legislative Assembly at the 1996 Clarence state by-election, which was triggered by Causley's resignation to stand for parliament. He was only the second Labor member to win Clarence since its creation in 1859. According to The Sydney Morning Herald, he was "regarded as an extremely effective grassroots political campaigner, often driving hundreds of kilometres a day to attend meetings and visit constituents".

Woods held ministerial office in the government of Bob Carr as Minister for Regional Development and Minister for Rural Affairs from 1997 to 1999 and Minister for Local Government, Minister for Regional Development and Minister for Rural Affairs from 1999 to 2003. In October 2002 he announced that he would retire from parliament at the 2003 state election.

== Personal life ==
Woods had four children with his first wife, whom he married in 1968; he remarried in 1983. His son Patrick became a quadriplegic after suffering a severe epileptic fit on a family holiday in 1987.

After leaving parliament, Woods worked for a period as a professional fisherman, became an accredited mediator, and was involved in property development. He also undertook policy review work for the New South Wales state government. In 2015 he was appointed as a director of the Fisheries Research and Development Corporation.

Parliament of Australia
Preceded by Ian Robinson	Member for Page; 1990–1996	Succeeded by Ian Causley
New South Wales Legislative Assembly
Preceded by Ian Causley	Member for Clarence; 1996–2003	Succeeded by Steve Cansdell
Political offices
Preceded by Ernie Page	Minister for Local Government; 1999–2003	Succeeded by Tony Kelly
