= Chris Gulaptis =

Australian politician

Member of the New South Wales Parliament for Clarence
- In office 19 November 2011 – 3 March 2023
- Preceded by: Steve Cansdell
- Succeeded by: Richie Williamson

Parliamentary Secretary for Agriculture and Forestry
- In office 22 June 2021 – 25 March 2023
- Minister: Adam Marshall (2021); Dugald Saunders (2021-2023)
- Preceded by: Michael Johnsen

Parliamentary Secretary for Regional Roads and Infrastructure
- In office 24 April 2019 – 22 June 2021
- Minister: Paul Toole

Parliamentary Secretary for Regional Planning
- In office 1 February 2017 – 23 March 2019
- Minister: Rob Stokes

Parliamentary Secretary for the North Coast
- In office 24 April 2015 – 25 April 2016
- Minister: John Barilaro
- Preceded by: Duncan Gay (as Minister for the North Coast)

Personal details
- Born: Perth, Western Australia
- Party: The Nationals
- Spouse: Vicki
- Occupation: Surveyor

Christopher Gulaptis is an Australian politician who was a member of the New South Wales Legislative Assembly. He represented Clarence for The Nationals from the 2011 by-election until his retirement in March 2023.

== Background and early career ==
Of Greek background, Gulaptis was born in Perth, Western Australia, and graduated with a degree in applied science from the Western Australian Institute of Technology (now Curtin University) and commenced practice as a surveyor. He moved to Clarence Valley in New South Wales in 1980, and was a councillor on Maclean Shire Council, where he also served as mayor. His service as a councillor ceased when all five local government councils in the Clarence Valley were amalgamated into one council, the Clarence Valley Council.

Gulaptis successfully stood at the first Clarence Valley local government election in 2005 and served as one of nine councillors. He unsuccessfully stood for mayor of the new council in March and September 2005 and September 2006 and resigned as a councillor in 2008.

== Parliamentary career ==
Gulaptis contested the seat of Page at the 2007 federal election. Although capturing the most primary votes, he lost to the Labor candidate, Janelle Saffin, after distribution of preferences. Gulaptis retained his Lower Clarence residence but took employment in Queensland in the interim, and returned to the Clarence Valley when he was pre-selected as Nationals candidate in the Clarence by-election.

Following the 2015 Australian greyhound racing live baiting scandal and the decision by the Baird government to ban greyhound racing NSW from 1 July 2017, legislation was introduced into the NSW Legislative Assembly and Gulaptis crossed the floor to vote against the government. At the time of the vote Gulaptis was the Parliamentary Secretary for the North Coast; however, the following day he was informed that was no longer a parliamentary secretary.

New South Wales Legislative Assembly
Preceded by Steve Cansdell	Member for Clarence; 2011–2023	Succeeded by Richie Williamson
