= Bill Weiley =

Australian politician

Member of the New South Wales Parliament for Clarence
- In office 1955–1971
- Preceded by: Cecil Wingfield
- Succeeded by: Matt Singleton

Personal details
- Born: 6 April 1901 Grafton, New South Wales
- Died: 11 September 1989 (aged 88) Grafton, New South Wales
- Party: Country Party

William Robert Weiley (6 April 1901 – 11 September 1989) was an Australian politician and a member of the New South Wales Legislative Assembly from 1955 until 1971. He was a member of the Country Party.

Weiley was born in Grafton, New South Wales and was educated at Grafton High School. He was employed as a commercial traveler, radio announcer and hotel manager. Weiley became involved in community organizations in Grafton including the Hospital Board, Chamber of Commerce, Rotary International and the Grafton Water Board. He was elected as an alderman on Grafton City Council between 1937 and 1953 and was the Mayor from 1950 to 1952. Weiley was elected to parliament as the Country Party member for Clarence at the 1955 by-election caused by the death of the incumbent member Cecil Wingfield. He was re-elected at the next 5 elections and retired in 1971.

New South Wales Legislative Assembly
Preceded by Cecil Wingfield	Member for Clarence; 1955–1971	Succeeded by Matt Singleton
