= Ian Causley =

Australian politician (1940–2020)

The Honourable Ian Causley

Member of the Australian Parliament for Page
- In office 2 March 1996 – 17 October 2007
- Preceded by: Harry Woods
- Succeeded by: Janelle Saffin

Personal details
- Born: 19 October 1940 Maclean, New South Wales
- Died: 27 April 2020 (aged 79)
- Party: The Nationals
- Occupation: Farmer

Ian Raymond Causley (19 October 1940 – 27 April 2020) was an Australian farmer and politician. He was a Nationals member of the Australian House of Representatives, representing the Division of Page, New South Wales from 1996 to 2007. He had previously served in the New South Wales parliament from 1984, serving in the state ministry.

== Early life ==
Causley was born on 19 October 1940 in Maclean, New South Wales, the son of Hilda Jean (née Lewis) and Samuel Arthur Causley. His father was a fourth-generation sugarcane farmer.

Causley attended Chatsworth Island Public School and Maclean High School. He won a scholarship to attend the University of New England, but instead chose to work as a sugarcane cutter and save up to purchase his own property. He became president of the Clarence River Cane Growers' Association as well as a director of the New South Wales Sugar Milling Co-operative and a member of the New South Wales Cane Growers' Council. He and his wife also owned and managed a hotel in Lismore.

== State politics ==
Causley joined the Country Party (later National Party) in 1965. He was elected to the New South Wales Legislative Assembly at the 1984 state election, winning the seat of Clarence for the Nationals from the incumbent Australian Labor Party (ALP) MP Don Day. He was promoted to state cabinet in 1988 and served as Minister for Natural Resources (1988–90 and 1991–93), Minister for Water Resources (1990–91), Chief Secretary (1990–91), Minister for Agriculture and Fisheries (1993–95) and Minister for Mines (1993–95).

In 1990, Causley and deputy premier Wal Murray were investigated by the Independent Commission Against Corruption over allegations they had allowed the sale of Crown land to a National Party donor on non-commercial terms. They were cleared of corruption but found to have "created a climate conducive to corrupt conduct". Causley successfully sued the Sydney Morning Herald for damages over the allegations.

== Federal politics ==
In the federal parliament, Causley was Deputy Speaker from February 2002 to November 2007, the last five years of the John Howard Prime Ministership, under Speakers Neil Andrew and David Hawker.

His former parliamentary colleague Larry Anthony remembered him as a man who wasn't afraid to voice his opinions which made him a rare breed in politics. This perhaps precluded him being appointed a federal minister despite his many years as a state minister.

Causley retired at the 2007 election. He died on 27 April 2020.

New South Wales Legislative Assembly
Preceded by Don Day	Member for Clarence; 1984–1996	Succeeded by Harry Woods
Parliament of Australia
Preceded by Harry Woods	Member for Page; 1996–2007	Succeeded by Janelle Saffin
