= John Purves (politician) =

Australian politician

John Mitchell Purves VD (2 August 1847 – 17 September 1915) was an Australian politician.

== Earliy life ==
He was born at Port Macquarie to Presbyterian clergyman Reverend William Purves and Alison Inglis Adams. He attended the University of Sydney from 1866 to 1872, receiving a Bachelor of Arts and a Master of Arts. From 1870 to 1871 he went to England, and on his return he settled in the Clarence River district. On 27 November 1873 he married Annie Georgina Metcalfe, with whom he had three children.

== Political career ==
In 1880, he was elected to the New South Wales Legislative Assembly for Clarence, serving until his defeat in 1887. A real estate agent, he also served as a North Sydney alderman and several terms as mayor.

== Later life ==
Purves died at Woollahra in 1915.

New South Wales Legislative Assembly
Preceded by Charles Fawcett	Member for Clarence; 1880 – 1887	Succeeded by John McFarlane
Civic offices
Preceded by Gerald Joseph Barry	Mayor of North Sydney; 1897 – 1898	Succeeded by Francis Clarke
Preceded by Francis Clarke	Mayor of North Sydney; 1899 – 1901	Succeeded by Thomas Wilson Hodgson
Academic offices
Preceded by John Kinloch	Esquire Bedell of the University of Sydney; 1897 – 1915	Succeeded by Robert John Allwright Massie
