= Cecil Wingfield =

Australian politician

Personal details
- Born: 21 September 1893 near Ulmarra, New South Wales
- Died: 28 January 1955 (aged 61) Yamba, New South Wales
- Party: Country Party

Cecil Gordon Wingfield (21 September 1893 – 28 January 1955) was an Australian politician and a member of the New South Wales Legislative Assembly from 1938 until his death. He was a member of the Country Party.

Wingfield was born near Ulmarra, New South Wales. He was the son of a storekeeper and was educated to elementary level in Ulmarra. He served in the First Australian Imperial Force during World War One and later became a storekeeper in Grafton, New South Wales. Wingfield became involved with local community organizations including Rotary and the Freemasons. He was elected to the New South Wales Parliament as the Country Party member for the seat of Clarence at the 1938 election. The Country Party allowed multiple endorsements for the seat and he defeated the sitting member Alfred Henry. He retained the seat at the next 5 elections and died while in office. He did not hold party, parliamentary or ministerial office.

New South Wales Legislative Assembly
Preceded by Alfred Henry	Member for Clarence; 1938–1955	Succeeded by Bill Weiley
