= William Zuill =

Australian politician

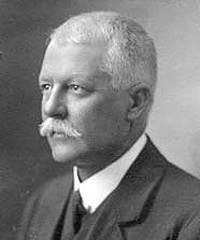
William Zuill

William Arthur Zuill (1867 – 21 June 1942) was an Australian politician.

He was born at Saltwater near Grafton to grazier John Zuill and Janet Anderson. He attended local private schools, and an accident during his childhood left him partially crippled. In 1895 he purchased a dairy farm at Lower Southgate, later becoming an estate agent and valuer at Grafton. In 1915 he was elected to the New South Wales Legislative Assembly as the member for Clarence; he stood as an Independent Liberal endorsed by the Farmers' and Settlers' Association of New South Wales, but later joined the Nationalist Party. He was defeated in 1920 and died at Grafton in 1942.

New South Wales Legislative Assembly
Preceded by John McFarlane	Member for Clarence; 1915–1920	Abolished
