= Thomas Bawden =

Australian politician

Thomas Bawden (1 December 1833 – 18 May 1897) was an English-born Australian politician.

He was the son of William Bawden and Mary Williams, and he migrated to New South Wales in the early 1840s. He settled near the Clarence River, becoming a prominent local businessman and mayor at Grafton. In 1856 he married Elizabeth Anne Hindmarsh; they had thirteen children. In 1869 he was elected to the New South Wales Legislative Assembly for Clarence, serving until his resignation in 1880. Bawden died at Grafton in 1897.

New South Wales Legislative Assembly
Preceded by John Robertson	Member for Clarence; 1869–1880	Succeeded by Charles Fawcett
