= Charles Fawcett (politician) =

Australian politician

Charles Hugh Fawcett (10 May 1812 – 15 March 1890) was an Irish-born Australian politician.

He was born in County Fermanagh to Hugh Fawcett. He migrated to New South Wales around 1843, and in 1844 acquired property on the Richmond River. From 1862 to 1870 he served as Police Magistrate at Tabulam. In 1880 he was elected to the New South Wales Legislative Assembly in a by-election for Clarence, moving to Richmond in the general election later that year. Fawcett did not re-contest in 1882, and retired to Bulahdelah where he became police magistrate. In December 1885, his headquarters were transferred to Stroud. Fawcett died in Stroud in 1890.

Alongside his work in the public service, Fawcett collected botanical specimens for Ferdinand von Mueller from the Richmond River area of New South Wales. The bulk of his herbarium (about 1200 specimens) is held at the National Herbarium of Victoria, Royal Botanic Gardens Victoria. About 100 of his specimens are held at the National Herbarium of New South Wales.

He is eponymized in the genus Fawcettia, which was described by Ferdinand von Mueller in 1877, and the species Cylicodaphne fawcettiana F.Muell. and Rhipogonum fawcettianum Benth.

New South Wales Legislative Assembly
Preceded by Thomas Bawden	Member for Clarence; 1880	Succeeded by John Purves
New seat	Member for Richmond; 1880–1882	Succeeded by Samuel Gray
