= Alfred Henry =

Australian politician

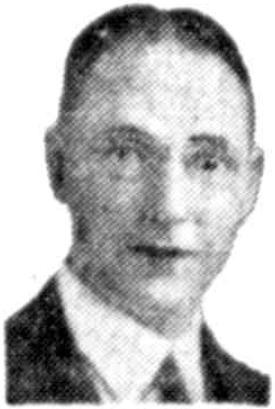
- Henry circa. 1932

Member of the New South Wales Legislative Assembly
- In office 7 March 1931 – 24 February 1938
- Preceded by: Alfred Pollack
- Succeeded by: Cecil Wingfield
- Constituency: Clarence

Personal details
- Born: Alfred Stephen Henry; 28 April 1890 Warialda, New South Wales, Australia
- Died: 27 September 1938 (aged 48) Stroud, New South Wales, Australia
- Party: Country
- Relations: Ernest Henry (brother); Goya Henry (brother)
- Education: Grafton High School; University of Sydney
- Occupation: Solicitor

Alfred Stephen Henry (28 April 1890 – 27 September 1938) was an Australian lawyer and politician. He was a member of the New South Wales Legislative Assembly from 1931 to 1938, representing the seat of Clarence for the Country Party.

== Early life ==
Henry was born on 28 April 1890 at Warialda, New South Wales. He was the son of Ada Emily (née Stephen) and Thomas Henry James, a doctor.

Henry moved to Grafton with his family at the age of five. His brothers included Olympic swimmer Ernest Henry and aviator Goya Henry. He was educated in Grafton and later boarded at The King's School, Parramatta. In 1912 he was awarded the bronze medal of the Royal Shipwreck Relief and Humane Society for saving a man from drowning at Yamba.

== Career ==
Henry served his articles of clerkship with Frank McGuren in Grafton. He was admitted to practise as a solicitor in 1917 and established his own practice in Sydney in 1919. During World War I he served as a private with the 15th Field Ambulance of the Australian Imperial Force.

Henry notably represented his aviator brother Goya Henry in the High Court case R v Burgess; Ex parte Henry, successful arguing that the federal government did not have the power to regulate intrastate aviation.

=== Politics ===
Henry was elected to the New South Wales Legislative Assembly at the 1931 Clarence state by-election, retaining the seat for the Country Party following the death of Alfred Pollack. He was re-elected at the 1932 and 1935 New South Wales state elections, but was defeated by fellow Country Party candidate Cecil Wingfield in 1938 after the party endorsed multiple candidates.

== Personal life ==
Henry married Flora Stewart in 1920, with whom he had one son. He owned an estate of 130 acres (53 ha) outside of South Grafton, New South Wales.

Henry was killed in a motor vehicle accident on 27 September 1938, when a vehicle in which he was a passenger overturned on the Pacific Highway outside of Stroud, New South Wales. He was thrown out of the car and crushed to death underneath it, while the driver Thomas Watt received minor injuries. An inquest was held the following month which returned a verdict of accidental death, with the coroner accepting Watt's evidence that Henry had grabbed the steering wheel immediately before the crash.

New South Wales Legislative Assembly
Preceded by Alfred Pollack	Member for Clarence; 1931–1938	Succeeded by Cecil Wingfield
