= John McFarlane (Australian politician) =

Australian politician

John McFarlane (1854–1915) was a member of the New South Wales Legislative Assembly for 28 years, 4 months and 29 days (from 11 February 1887 to 9 July 1915).

Born on 26 January (Anniversary Day) 1854 in the Hunter River district of New South Wales, John McFarlane was the son of John McFarlane, a schoolteacher and farmer, and Mary Stewart, who had come independently to Australia from Scotland (John from the Isle of Mull) and married in 1848. The McFarlane family settled in the Clarence River district in 1861. John McFarlane was educated in public schools and by his father. On leaving school, he assisted his father on the land. He married Ellen Quayle in 1885 in the Ulmarra District – between Grafton and Ballina - and they had one daughter and three sons.

John McFarlane initially worked as a farmers co-op manager. He became Secretary of North Coast Farmers Co-operative Association in Grafton, and then moved to Sydney when he was elected to the NSW Legislative Assembly as the member for Clarence - as a Protectionist, then Liberal (after 1907). He continued working as a manager, but resigned in December 1891. He then became a produce and timber merchant. The McFarlane Bridge at Maclean, constructed in 1906, was named after him.

On the Clarence he promoted the School of Arts, mutual improvement societies, cricket and rowing clubs, was an active member of the Cattle Stealing Prevention Association and served as Trustee of National Parks from 1905 until 1915. He was also an Orangeman.

John McFarlane died suddenly on 9 July 1915, at his home in Marrickville. His funeral was held in the Presbyterian cemetery at Rookwood, Sydney.

New South Wales Legislative Assembly
Preceded by John Purves	Member for Clarence; 1887–1915	Succeeded by William Zuill
