= Steve Cansdell =

New South Wales politician

Member of the New South Wales Legislative Assembly for Clarence
- In office 22 March 2003 – 16 September 2011
- Preceded by: Harry Woods
- Succeeded by: Chris Gulaptis

Personal details
- Born: 23 September 1950 (age 76) Dubbo, New South Wales, Australia
- Party: Shooters, Fishers and Farmers Party
- Other political affiliations: National Party (2003–2016)
- Occupation: Boxer

Stephen Rhett Cansdell (born 23 September 1950 in Dubbo) is an Australian former professional boxer and former member of the New South Wales Legislative Assembly.

He was Australian professional light heavyweight boxing champion in 1973/1974 and Queensland professional heavyweight boxing champion from 1978 to 1981. Cansdell became champion with a sixth-round knockout over Johnny Gorkom; he lost to Greg Mcnamara over ten rounds in a non-title fight. Cansdell later trained future light heavyweight world champion Jeff Harding.

He is married with four adult children. He was elected as a member of the Grafton City Council in 1993

Cansdell represented Clarence for the National Party from 2003 to 2011.

He resigned from parliament on 16 September 2011 over a false declaration related to a traffic offence. In 2019, Cansdell contested Clarence at the state election as a candidate for the Shooters, Fishers and Farmers Party (SFF); he received 17% of the votes.

== Notes ==
New South Wales Legislative Assembly
Preceded by Harry Woods	Member for Clarence; 2003–2011	Succeeded by Chris Gulaptis
