= Jack Kavanagh (politician) =

Canadian politician

Chairman of the Communist Party of Australia
- In office 1925–1929
- Succeeded by: Herbert Moxon

Personal details
- Born: John Patrick Marcus Kavanagh; 12 July 1879 Ireland, United Kingdom
- Died: 6 July 1964 (aged 84) Loftus, New South Wales, Australia
- Citizenship: British; Irish
- Party: Socialist (Canada); Communist (Canada); Communist (Australia)

Military service
- Allegiance: United Kingdom
- Branch/service: British Army
- Years of service: 1900–1906
- Rank: Corporal
- Unit: King's Royal Rifle Corps
- Battles/wars: Second Boer War

John Patrick Marcus Kavanagh (12 July 1879 – 6 July 1964) was a socialist leader in Canada and Australia.

== Political activism in Canada ==
He was a leading member of the Socialist Party of Canada from 1908 to 1921. At the founding meeting of the Worker's Party of Canada, which was the public face of the underground Communist Party of Canada, he was elected to the National Executive Committee of the party in February 1922.

== Political activism in Australia ==
Kavanagh moved to Australia in 1925, arriving on May Day, and quickly became a central leader of the Communist Party of Australia. The party at the time was in disarray, with membership having shrunk to around 280 and a rapid turnover of activists. Under Kavanagh's leadership, the CPA introduced an education program, shifted its focus toward building a base in the workplaces, and established the Militant Women's Group, which organised Australia's first International Women's Day in 1928. By the end of 1928, party membership had grown to approximately 300. Kavanagh was involved in the 1927 Queensland sugar workers' strike and the nine-month timber workers' strike of 1929.

At the 1927 party conference, Kavanagh deliberately drew attention to the presence of a Comintern emissary, Robbie Robson, forcing him to flee to avoid detection by the government—described by historian Stuart Macintyre as "an imaginative method of resisting the authority of the Comintern." Lance Sharkey, who later became party leader, accused Kavanagh of using "Tammany tactics" to control the 1927 congress, of "cowardly capitulation" during a timber strike when he called off a march of strikers, and of opposing the Comintern's line on electoral politics by arguing that "Moscow knows nothing of Australia."

According to Sharkey, Kavanagh led a "Right-Wing" faction of the party. At the 1929 conference, Kavanagh called the Comintern's position "a lot of tripe" before being defeated by the faction loyal to Moscow. Although Sharkey accused Kavanagh of being on the right wing of the party, other accounts have placed Kavanagh on the left of the party during the same period. In 1930 the Comintern removed him from the leadership.

In January 1930, he lost his position as an organiser for the Sydney Trades and Labour Council, being voted out by a margin of 2 to 1.

He was expelled from the party in January 1931, readmitted, and then expelled a second time in 1934 after being accused of Trotskyism. In June 1934, the Central Committee of the CPA charged Kavanagh with holding opinions hostile to the Comintern and the party, specifically citing his refusal to label Leon Trotsky an "absolute counter-revolutionary" and his suggestion that a proposed Fourth International was not inherently counter-revolutionary. In his defence, Kavanagh argued that disagreeing with a designation from the Comintern did not constitute opposition to the general party line, and he criticised the party's leadership for what he saw as a "concept of infallibility" contrary to the principles of Marx and Lenin. He also noted that he had already been deprived of full party rights for over two years prior to the charges.

In 1940, Kavanagh joined the Communist League of Australia which was the Australian section of the Fourth International. In June 1946, he was announced as a candidate for the Revolutionary Workers' Party in the federal seat of West Sydney in the 1946 federal election but he did not ultimately contest the election.

== Sources ==
- David Akers, Margaret Sampson, John Patrick (Jack) Kavanagh (1879-1964) Australian Dictionary of Biography, Volume 14, 1996
- A. Davidson, The Communist Party of Australia (Stanford, California, US, 1969)
- F. Farrell, International Socialism and Australian Labour (Syd, 1981)
- David Akers, Rebel or Revolutionary? Jack Kavanagh and the Early Years of the Communist Movement in Vancouver, 1920-1925, Labour/Le Travail (St John's, Newfoundland, Canada), 30, Fall 1992, p 9
- Kavanagh papers (Australian National University Archives)
- J. N. Rawling papers (Australian National University Archives).
- Gordon Finlay private family papers

Party political offices
Preceded by Position established	General Secretary of the Communist Party of Australia; 1925–1929	Succeeded by Herbert Moxon
