= Electoral district of Clarence =

State electoral district of New South Wales, Australia

Clarence New South Wales—Legislative Assembly
- Interactive map of district boundaries from the 2023 state election
- State: New South Wales
- Dates current: 1859–1920; 1927–present
- MP: Richie Williamson
- Party: The Nationals
- Namesake: Clarence River
- Electors: 57,265 (2023)
- Area: 13,494.54 km^{2} (5,210.3 sq mi)
- Demographic: Rural
Electorates around Clarence:
Lismore	Lismore	Ballina
Northern Tablelands	Clarence	Pacific Ocean
Northern Tablelands	Oxley	Pacific Ocean

Clarence is an electoral district of the Legislative Assembly in the Australian state of New South Wales.

It includes all of the Clarence Valley Council including Grafton, Maclean, Yamba, Illuka, Junction Hill, Ulmarra, Coutts Crossing and Glenreagh, as well as all of the Richmond Valley Council including Casino, Coraki, Woodburn, Evans Head and Tatham.

== History ==
Clarence was created in 1859, replacing the New South Wales part of Clarence and Darling Downs. With the introduction of proportional representation in 1920, it was absorbed into Byron along with Lismore. It was recreated in 1927.

It has historically been a safe National seat, having been held by that party for all but seven years in its current incarnation. However, Labor has won it at high-tide elections.

== Members for Clarence ==
First incarnation (1859–1920)
Member	Party	Term
Clark Irving	None	1859–1864
John Laycock	None	1864–1866
John Robertson	None	1866–1869
Thomas Bawden	None	1869–1880
Charles Fawcett	None	1880–1880
John Purves	None	1880–1887
John McFarlane	Protectionist	1887–1901
John McFarlane	Progressive	1901–1907
John McFarlane	Liberal Reform	1907–1915
William Zuill	Liberal Reform	1915–1917
William Zuill	Nationalist	1917–1920
Second incarnation (1927–present)
Member	Party	Term
Alfred Pollack	Country	1927–1931
Alfred Henry	Country	1931–1938
Cecil Wingfield	Country	1938–1955
Bill Weiley	Country	1955–1971
Matt Singleton	Country	1971–1981
Don Day	Labor	1981–1984
Ian Causley	National	1984–1996
Harry Woods	Labor	1996–2003
Steve Cansdell	National	2003–2011
Chris Gulaptis	National	2011–2023
Richie Williamson	National	2023–present

== Election results ==
2023 New South Wales state election: Clarence
Party	Candidate	Votes	%	±%
National	Richie Williamson	24,247	49.6	+3.0
Labor	Leon Ankersmit	10,700	21.9	+0.9
Greens	Greg Clancy	3,739	7.6	−0.3
Legalise Cannabis	Mark Rayner	3,708	7.6	+7.6
Independent	Debrah Novak	3,433	7.0	+7.0
Independent	Nicki Levi	1,320	2.7	+2.7
Sustainable Australia	George Keller	1,061	2.2	+0.6
Independent Indigenous	Brett Duroux	725	1.5	+1.5
Total formal votes		48,933	96.2	−0.5
Informal votes		1,911	3.8	+0.5
Turnout		50,844	88.8	−0.7
Two-party-preferred result
National	Richie Williamson	26,475	64.3	−0.2
Labor	Leon Ankersmit	14,731	35.7	+0.2
National hold		Swing	−0.2	
