= Alfred Pollack =

Australian politician

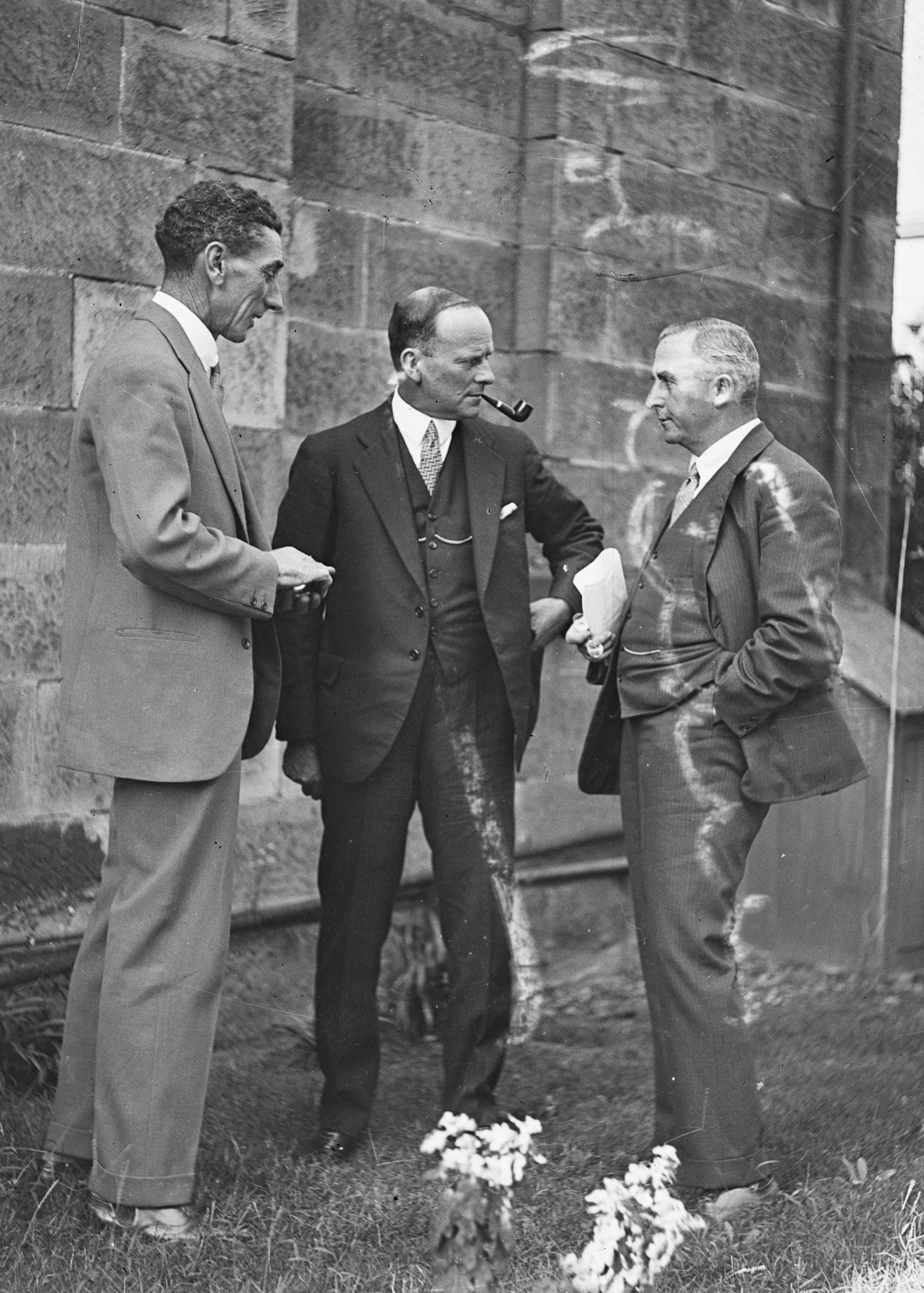
Pollack (right) with fellow Country Party members Bill Hedges (left) and Michael Bruxner

Alfred John Pollack (1878 – 30 January 1931) was an Australian politician.

He was born in Grafton to public servant Samuel Francis Pollack and Caroline Margaret, née Marsden. He attended school in Grafton and Armidale before becoming a solicitor in 1904. He married Janet Louisa Watson in 1903, with whom he had seven children. He was first a partner with McGuren and Pollack and then Pollack and Collins. He served in the New South Wales Legislative Assembly as the Country Party member for Clarence from 1927 until his death at Cremorne in 1931.

New South Wales Legislative Assembly
Preceded by New seat	Member for Clarence; 1927–1931	Succeeded by Alfred Henry
