= Sydney Twelve =

The Sydney Twelve or I.W.W. Twelve were members of the Industrial Workers of the World (IWW), arrested in September 1916 in Sydney, Australia, and initially charged with treason-felony. They were John Hamilton, Peter Larkin, Morris Joseph Fagin, William Teen, Donald Grant, John Benjamin King, Thomas Glynn, Donald McPherson, Thomas Moore, Charles Reeve, William Beattie and Bernard Bob Bessant. At a trial that commenced in November 1916 the men were charged instead with conspiracy offences, and in the febrile environment of a divisive wartime conscription referendum, were found guilty, based substantially on the evidence of paid police informants, and given harsh prison sentences of up to fifteen years. As details emerged about the quality of the evidence presented by the police and prosecution witnesses at the trial, there was a widespread belief within the Australian labour movement that the twelve men were political prisoners.

The federal Labor government had split as a result of the conscription issue, with Billy Hughes retaining power at the head of the new National Labor Party. After the trial of the IWW twelve, Hughes introduced legislation to enable the IWW to be declared an "unlawful association". This was initially only partially successful, but amendments in July 1917 allowed for the complete suppression of the organisation, the confiscation of its printing equipment and the incarceration for six months of IWW members. After the crackdown of the IWW the New South Wales Labor Council led the campaign for the release of the twelve IWW prisoners, supported by a small number of Labor parliamentarians and labour movement journalists and unionists. The publication of information about paid police informants and critical examination of evidence at the trial resulted in the Nationalist government in New South Wales appointing a Royal Commission in late 1918 to investigate charges of police misconduct in respect of the trial of the IWW twelve. The limited inquiry by Justice Street exonerated the police and confirmed the guilt of the convicted men.

The March 1920 general election in New South Wales resulted in a change of government, led by the Labor premier John Storey. However his government relied on the support of three independent labour members, two of whom were agitators for the release of the IWW prisoners. Storey appointed Justice Ewing to conduct a Royal Commission into the all aspects of the case. Ewing's conclusions, made public in late July 1920, found considerable problems with the convictions and sentencing of eleven of the twelve prisoners. As a result, ten of the men were released in early August 1920. The two remaining prisoners were released from prison in August and November 1921.

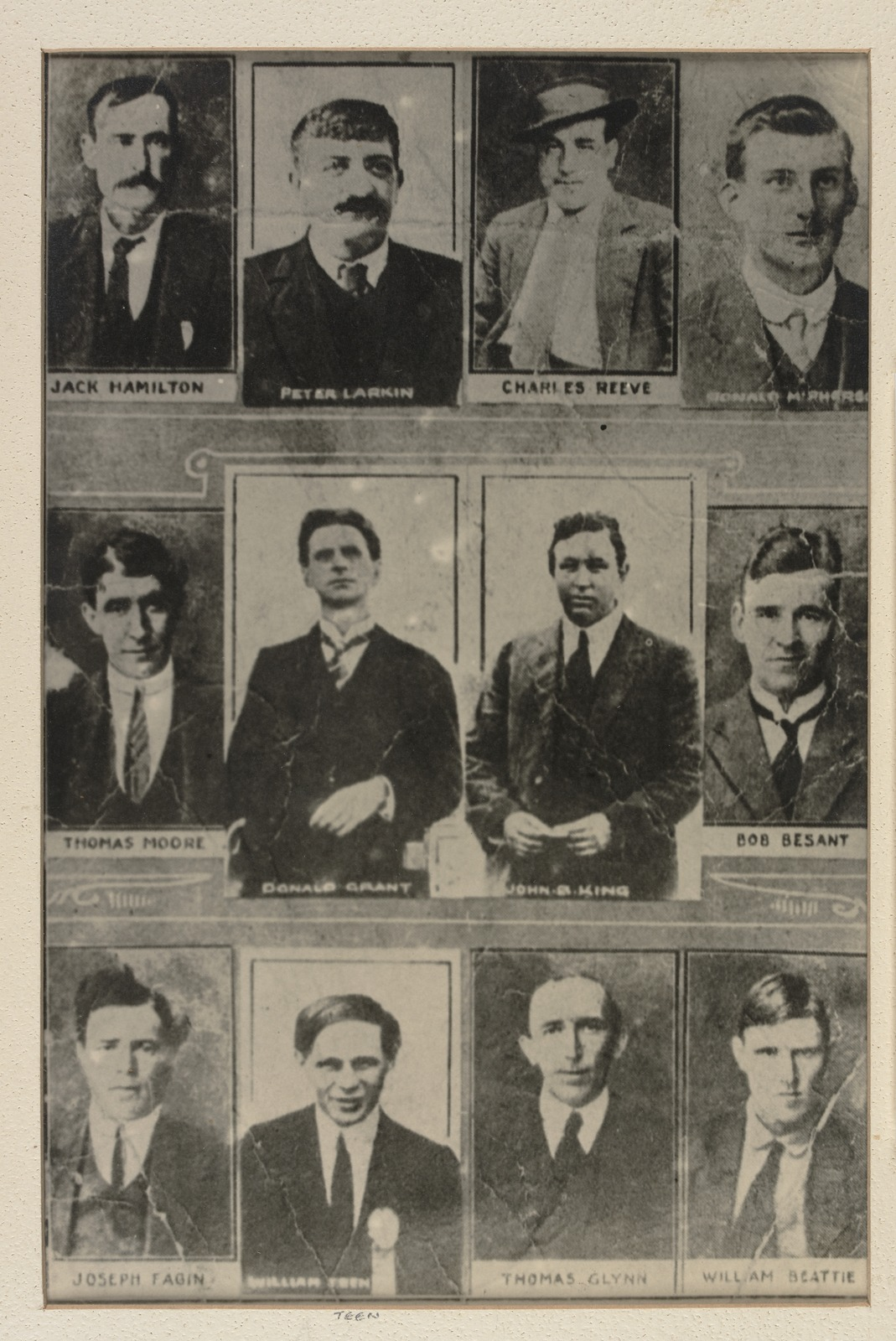
The Sydney Twelve.

== Background ==
When Britain declared war on Germany and the Central Powers in August 1914 there was broad community support for the patriotic, pro-Empire stance of Australian politicians. In September 1914 the Labor party (at that time known in New South Wales as the Political Labor League or P.L.L.) was swept to power with a majority in both houses of parliament under their leader Andrew Fisher, who had pledged that Australia would support "the mother country... to the last man and to the last shilling". Whatever initial opposition to the war that existed in Australia came from within the radical fringes of the labour movement. One group united in their opposition were the Australian members of the Industrial Workers of the World (IWW), an international labour union formed in Chicago in 1905. The IWW deliberately opposed or questioned the accepted conservative values of ethics and religion, parliamentary democracy and the monarchy, the sanctity of property, racial purity and trade unionism and arbitration. They were fervently opposed to "the capitalist war". The IWW's Direct Action newspaper began to be published in Sydney from January 1914.

As the war progressed the popular enthusiasm to enlist subsided. Rising unemployment and prices on the home-front, together with mounting casualties and stalemate on the battlefields of the Western Front, resulted in falling enlistments, to which the government responded with recruitment campaigns and a threat to introduce conscription. By 1916 a groundswell of community sentiment had begun to align with the anti-war stance of the IWW (whose members were known as 'Wobblies').

=== Tom Barker's imprisonment ===
In September 1915 the editor of Direct Action, Tom Barker, was prosecuted for publishing a poster considered to be "prejudicial to recruiting", which included a sardonic call to arms: "Your country needs you in the trenches!! Workers, follow your masters". Barker was convicted, but the conviction was overturned on appeal. In late March 1916 Barker was again brought before the court for an alleged breach of the War Precautions Act by making statements "likely to prejudice recruiting". The charge related to descriptive text and a caption below a cartoon depicting a crucified soldier, his blood being collected by a grotesque capitalist-figure ('Fat'), published on the front page of Direct Action on 4 December 1915. The magistrate imposed a fine of one hundred pounds, or in default twelve months' gaol. Barker's appeal was dismissed on 4 May and, refusing to pay the fine, he was sent to gaol. After a vigorous and aggressive campaign to free him by the IWW and sections of the labour movement, as well as depositions by members of parliament supporting his release, in early July 1916 it was reported that the attorney-general had decided to reduce Barker's fine from £100 to £50, "and the alternative term of imprisonment" from twelve months to three months. By reducing Barker's sentence it enabled his release from gaol in early August 1916.^{[A]}

== Arrests ==
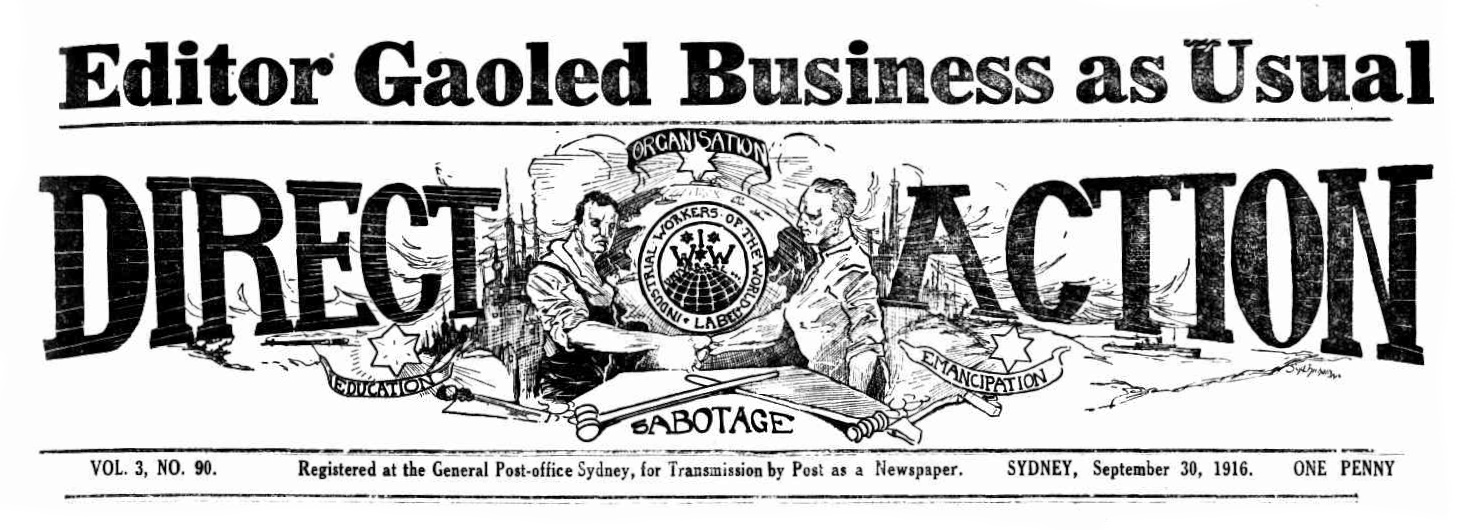
The banner of Direct Action newspaper, 30 September 1916, with the added text "Editor Gaoled Business as Usual".

In September 1916 detectives in Sydney claimed to have received information from several sources that members of the IWW were planning to burn down buildings in Sydney. The informants named "a Russian named Androvitch", a foreigner named Mahony (or Marney), and IWW members Jack Hamilton, Tom Glynn and Tom Moore. Glynn was the editor of the IWW's monthly newspaper, Direct Action. On 22 September warrants were issued on charges of treason for the arrest of the five named individuals, plus Peter Larkin, Charlie Reeve, Donald Grant and Fred Morgan. The additional four names were probably included because they were known as leading IWW propagandists and organisers.

The next day thirty police under Inspector Campbell raided the IWW headquarters in Sussex Street. They recognised and arrested Glynn, Larkin, Reeve and Hamilton. Bob Bessant and Don McPherson were also apprehended. They had no warrants for these two men so Bessant was charged with vagrancy and McPherson with being in possession of two shirts suspected of having been stolen. On 25 September Glynn, Larkin, Reeve and Hamilton appeared in the Central Police Court on the treason charge, after which they were remanded in prison. On 29 September Tom Moore was arrested and charged with treason. Donald Grant was arrested in Broken Hill where he was visiting to agitate against conscription. Extra information received from the police informants resulted in the arrests of Bill Teen, Joe Fagin, Don McPherson and Bill Beattie. On 3 October the eleven previously arrested IWW men appeared at the Central Police Court, charged with treason. Bail was refused and the men were remanded. On 6 October John Benjamin King, who was awaiting trial for forgery, was also charged with treason and remanded.

The committal hearing against the twelve IWW men, all charged with treason, opened on 10 October 1916 before the magistrate Arthur Barnett. The prosecution was led by the barrister Ernest Lamb, who in his opening address asserted that the 'Twelve' were responsible for a series of recent fires in Sydney with the intention of coercing the federal government over issues such as the introduction of conscription. Lamb described the crimes being prosecuted as "a gigantic conspiracy to cause havoc and destruction in Sydney, and to endanger the lives of the people". After the Crown had presented its case, the defence barrister Augustus James argued there was no case to answer. He contended that there was no evidence other than speeches and association against several of the accused men and that arson did not constitute treason. The magistrate decided that a prima facie case had been made against the men and committed them for trial at the Central Criminal Court on 20 November 1916. He refused bail.^{[B]}

== The Tottenham murder ==
The case against the twelve IWW men occurred in an atmosphere of general hysteria against the IWW, amplified by a divisive public debate during October in advance of the conscription referendum vote. The prosecution of the twelve IWW men in Sydney occurred concurrently with the trial of Frank Franz and Roland Kennedy, both members of the IWW, who were charged with the murder of a policeman at Tottenham, in the central west of New South Wales.^{[C]} The murder trial opened at the Bathurst Circuit Court on 18 October 1916. On the evening of 26 September 1916 constable George Duncan had been sitting at his desk by a window of the Tottenham police station. Franz and Kennedy were outside with rifles and shot at the policeman through the window before running away. Duncan's body was found near a wire fence outside the lockup "with bullets in the body". According to evidence given at the trial, on the day before the murder constable Duncan had arrested a IWW member for abusive language, during which "there was some hoots and a disturbance" from the gathered crowd. The next day the arrested man was taken by Duncan from Tottenham to the lockup at nearby Dandaloo. On his return Duncan interviewed Roland Kennedy and told him "he intended to take proceedings against him for abusive language". The prosecutor asserted that this sequence of events alone did not constitute the motive for the crime, but that "the murder was actuated by the pernicious influence" of the IWW, "whose objects and purposes no law-abiding citizen can uphold, with the result that the constable was foully murdered". A jury found both men guilty and they were sentenced to death.

There had been no judicial executions carried out in New South Wales since June 1912, when William Ball was hanged at Armidale Gaol for the murder of his wife at Bingara. Ball's execution was the only execution since a Labor government took office in New South Wales in October 1910. William Holman, the Labor premier since June 1913, had "often expressed his opposition to the infliction of the capital penalty". However in late-November 1916 the Executive Council confirmed the death sentences of Franz and Kennedy. Despite efforts for a reprieve by the IWW and other labour organisations (including the New South Wales Labor Council), the two men were executed on 20 December 1916 at Bathurst Gaol.

== The trial ==
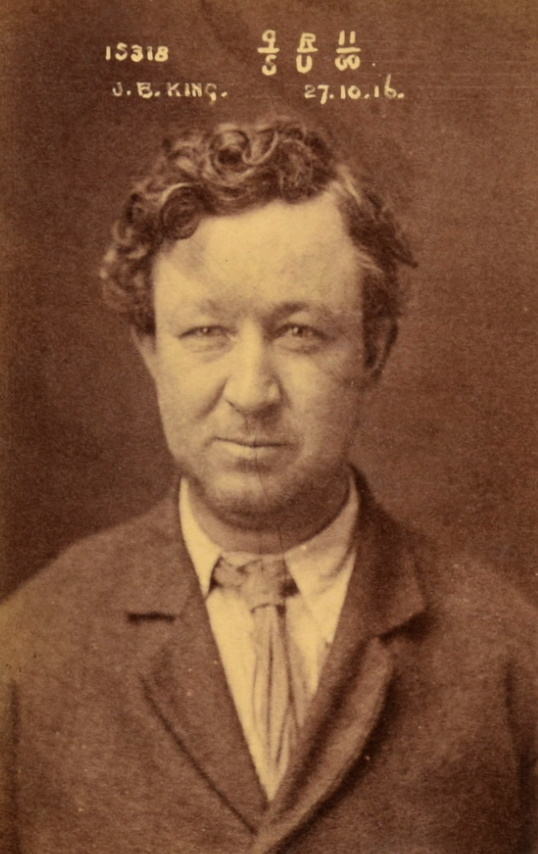
John Benjamin King (prisoner 15318).

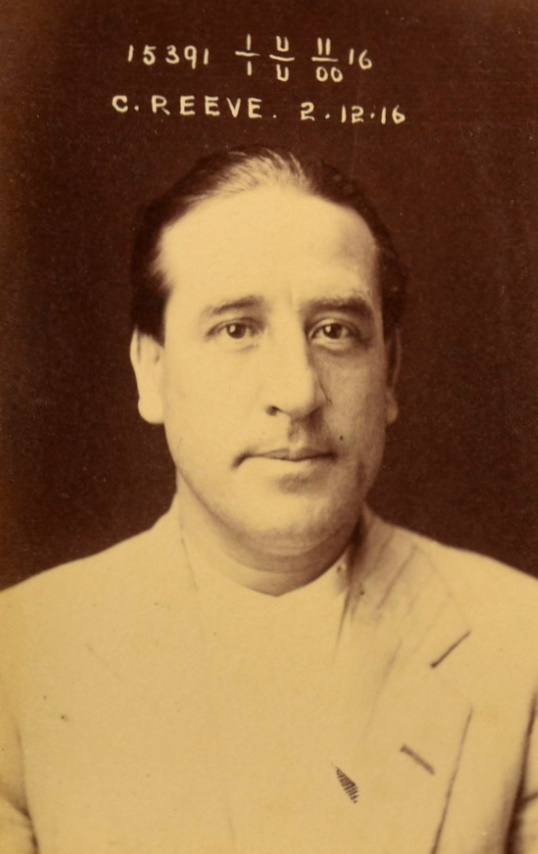
Charles Reeve (prisoner 15391).

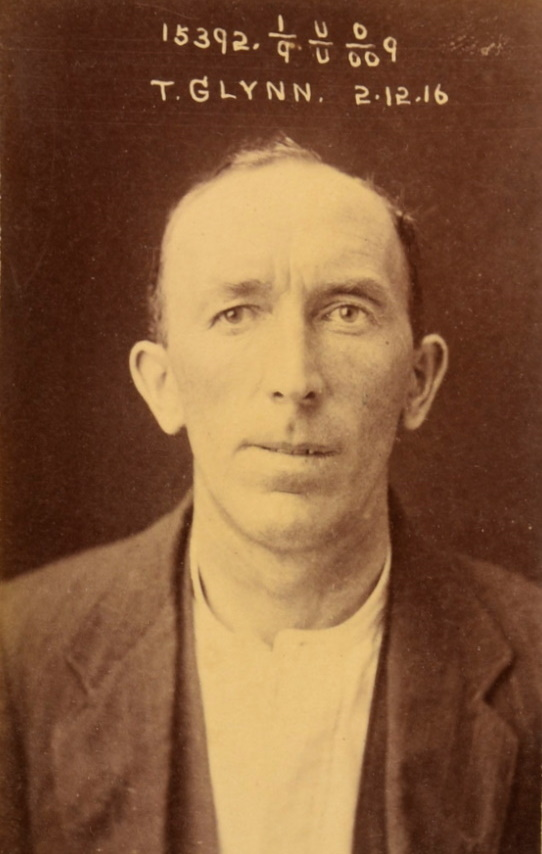
Thomas Glynn (prisoner 15392).

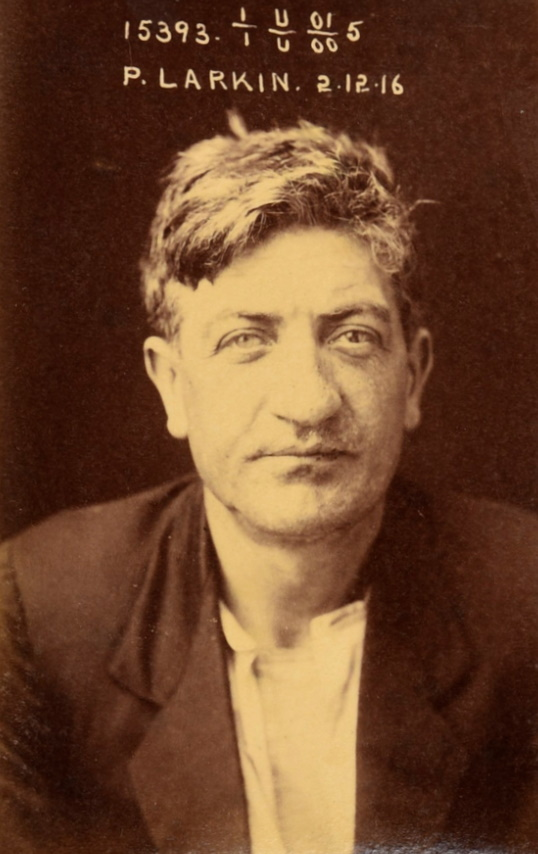
Peter Larkin (prisoner 15393).

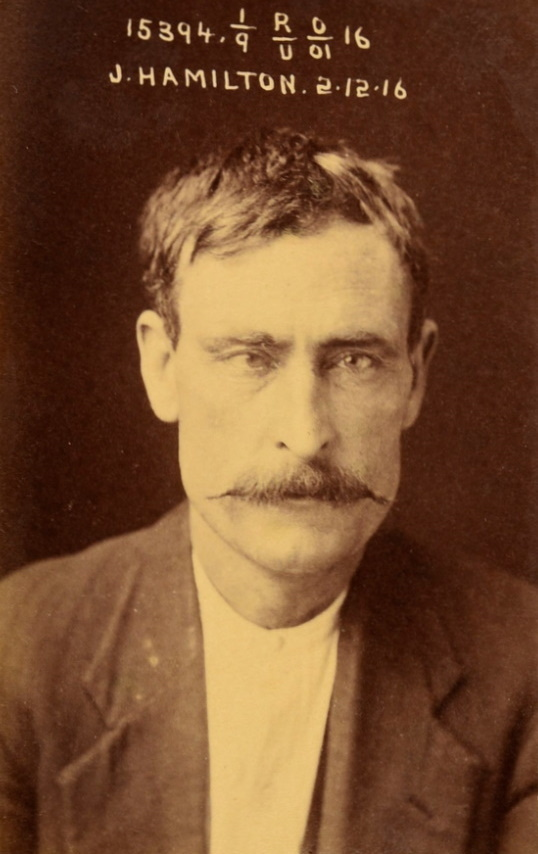
John Hamilton (prisoner 15394).

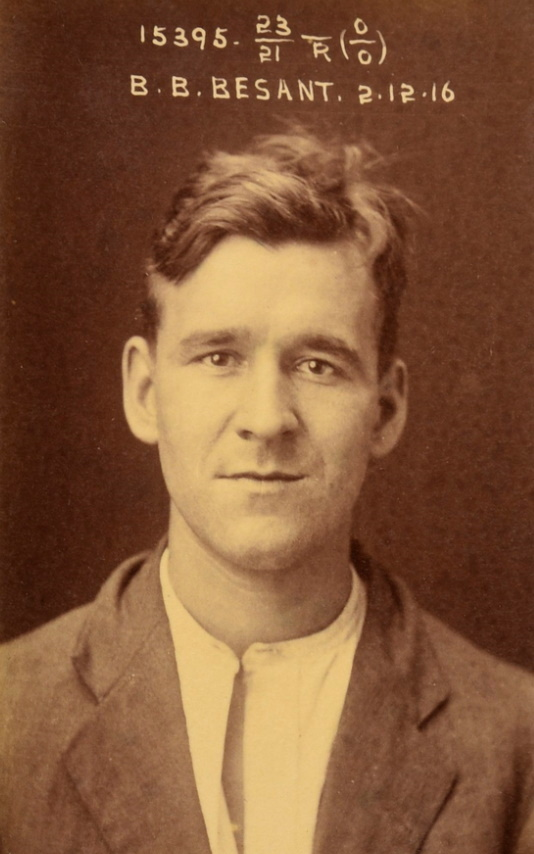
Bob Bessant (prisoner 15395).

Prisoner identification photographs

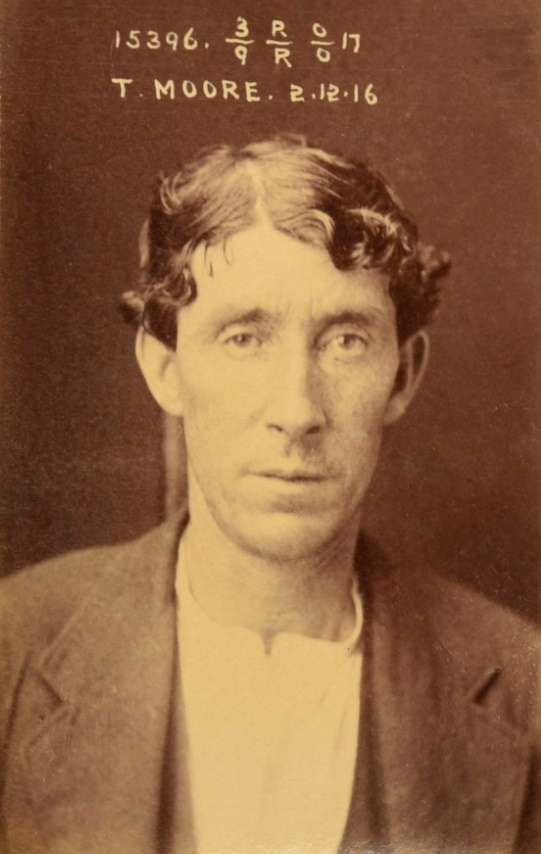
Thomas Moore (prisoner 15396).

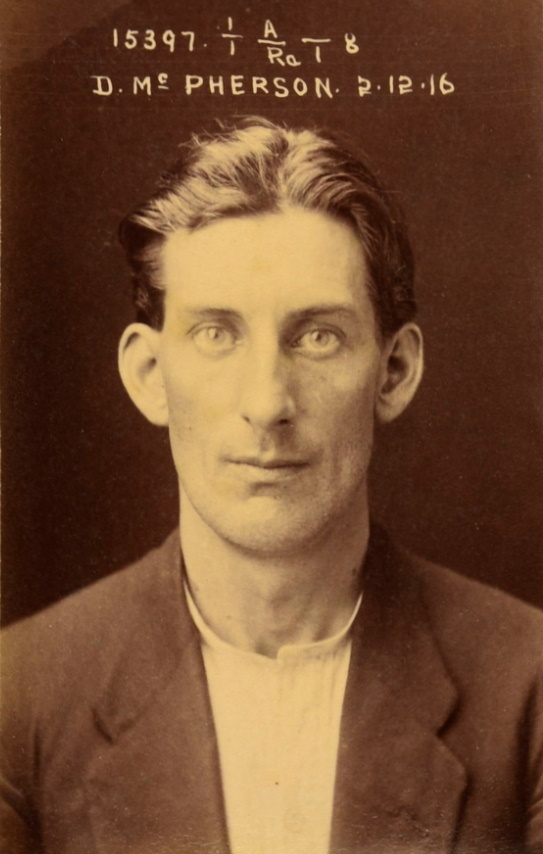
Donald McPherson (prisoner 15397).

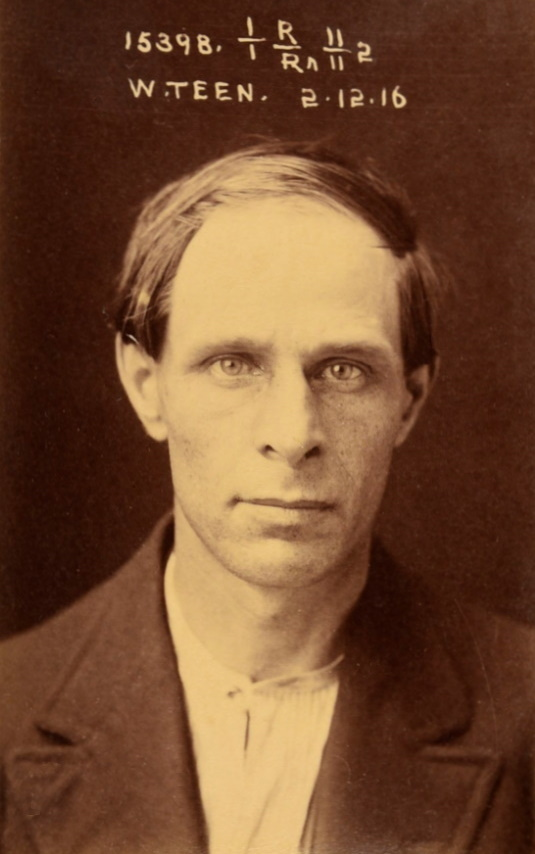
William Teen (prisoner 15398).

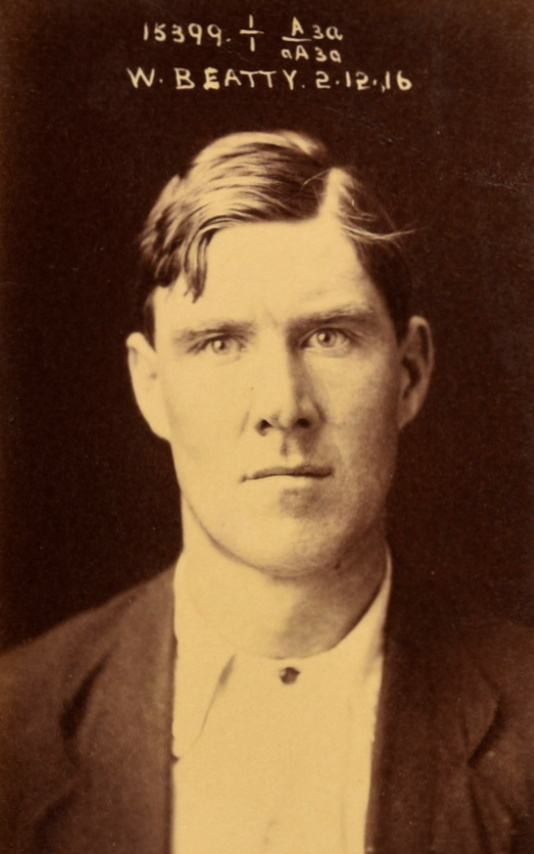
William Beattie (Beatty) (prisoner 15399).

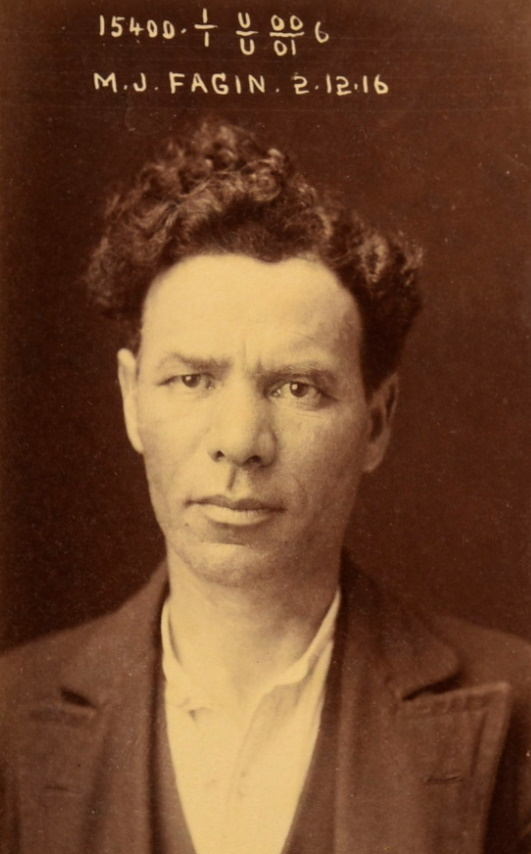
Morris Joseph Fagin (prisoner 15400).

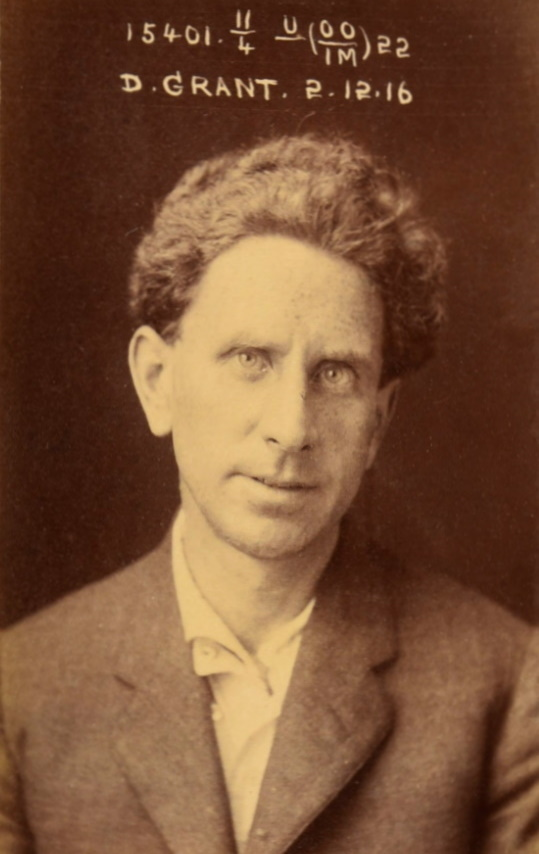
Donald Grant (prisoner 15401).

In late October 1916 the Crown Law authorities advised the solicitor for the twelve IWW men that the treason-felony charges against his clients had been replaced by three conspiracy charges: (1) conspiracy to commit arson; (2) conspiracy to procure the release of Tom Barker from gaol by unlawful means; and, (3) conspiracy to excite sedition by devising "to raise and create discontent and disaffection" in the community and "excite contempt" of the government and constitution. Conspiracy charges were easier to sustain than treason-felony, which required proof of the intention or preparation to commit overt acts of treason, whereas a charge of conspiracy only required establishing that there was an agreement between parties to do something unlawful. Conspiracy could be established if criminal acts were proved against some of the parties, and it was further proved that the other alleged conspirators were in constant association and shared a common purpose with the perpetrators of the unlawful acts. This legal interpretation formed the basis of the prosecution of the Sydney Twelve.

The trial of the twelve IWW men opened on 20 November 1916 in the Central Criminal Court in Darlinghurst, before the Supreme Court judge Justice Robert Pring. The case for the prosecution took up the whole of the first week of the trial. During the defence case nine of the twelve accused men made unsworn statements, which were not subject to cross-examination. Several of the men provided details of alibis to counter specific allegations against them. McPherson, Grant and Bessant gave evidence on oath, providing alibis and supporting witnesses. In his final address to the jury, the solicitor for five of the twelve men argued that the prosecution's case relied upon the uncorroborated evidence of three informers, Harry Scully, 'Mac' McAlister and Davis Goldstein. The barrister James Gannon, representing six of the accused, singled out Scully, describing him as "a skunk, a coward and a criminal". One of the twelve, John King, had conducted his own defence during the trial. During his address to the jury he claimed there was insufficient evidence to convict "a sick cat". In regard to the alleged conspiracy King stated that the Industrial Workers of the World was opposed to violence, an ideology antithetical to the destruction of life and incendiarism. He insisted that the IWW existed to remove the conditions that led to crime, not to advocate it.

During his six hour summing up of the prosecution case, the barrister Ernest Lamb stated that the case was "of supreme importance to the people of Australia and... the whole of the people of the Empire". He explained that several of the accused were men of intelligence. The Crown case did not allege they had engaged in the purchase and handling of substances for the purpose of setting fires, but that they remained behind the scenes while others did the work. Lamb concluded by claiming the evidence established the existence of a conspiracy and that the jury's duty was to find each accused man guilty on all three counts.

On 1 December 1916, the final day of the trial, Justice Pring took four hours to summarise the evidence and instruct the jury. He addressed the claim that certain of the witnesses for the prosecution were accomplices and warned the jury not to find an accused person guilty on the uncorroborated evidence of such a witness. The judge described Scully as an accomplice, instructed the jury to make up their own minds regarding McAlister and did not mention the possibility of Davis Goldstein being an accomplice. In regard to William Beattie, Pring explained that the only evidence connecting him to the alleged conspiracy was the evidence of the accomplice Scully and told the jury: "I do not say you must not convict, but you ought not to convict". In regard to the alibis offered by Larkin, Glynn, Reeve and McPherson the judge agreed that the Crown witnesses must have made mistakes but dismissed this as confusion about the dates. In regard to the charge of conspiracy to excite sedition, Pring interpreted liberty of speech as entitlement to discuss any subject "in a fair and temperate way", but he categorised IWW ideology as the propagation of a class war between employees and employers and considered it to far exceed this limit. The jury returned to court after five hours and delivered its verdicts. Glynn, Hamilton, McPherson, Teen, Beattie, Fagin and Grant were found guilty on all three counts. Reeve, Larkin, Bessant and Moore were found guilty of the conspiracy to commit arson and the conspiracy to excite sedition. King was determined to be guilty of only the single charge of seditious conspiracy. The prisoners were remanded to the following morning for sentencing. Outside the court a crowd of about two thousand had gathered. Uniformed police held back the crowd as a motor van conveyed the prisoners to the police station across the street.

On the following day the twelve prisoners were returned to court for sentencing. Justice Pring's relatively dispassionate instructions to the jury the previous day gave way to a less restrained speech. He mentioned the Tottenham IWW members, Franz and Kennedy, due to be executed on 20 December, and addressed the prisoners: "... you may consider yourselves very lucky that some of you were not in the same position, because you have not hesitated to devise a devilish scheme not merely for the destruction of property, but absolutely regardless of human life". Pring then delivered the sentences. Glynn, Hamilton, McPherson, Teen, Beattie, Fagin and Grant, found guilty on all three counts, were sentenced on each count to fifteen years with hard labour in Parramatta Gaol, the sentences to be concurrent. Reeve, Larkin, Bessant and Moore were sentenced on each of two counts to ten years with hard labour in Bathurst Gaol, the sentences to be concurrent. King was sentenced to five years with hard labour in Bathurst Gaol, the sentence to commence at the expiration of the three years he was currently serving.^{[D]}

== Responses and backlash ==
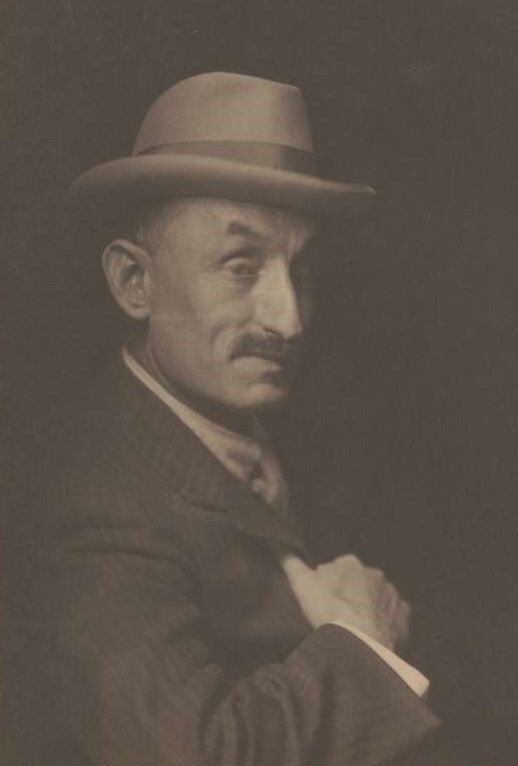
Henry Boote, editor of The Australian Worker.

The campaign for the release of the twelve IWW prisoners began by seeking the support of other sections of the labour movement. Many within the industrial and political sections of the labour movement were wary of identifying with the IWW, concerned that they were in fact saboteurs who practised the lawlessness and disruption that they advocated. However, within weeks of the convictions of the twelve the guilt or innocence of the men had given way to the notion by many that they were working-class martyrs. The arrests, trial and convictions of the IWW twelve occurred at a turbulent time in Australia. The conscription referendum, driven by the Labor prime minister, Billy Hughes, was held on 28 October 1916 and resulted in the defeat of the proposal to allow conscripted troops to serve overseas. The campaign was particularly bitter within the labour movement. The subsequent trial of the IWW men and the severity of the sentences imposed by Justice Pring, perceived to be biassed against labour, led to a widespread belief within the labour movement that the IWW prisoners "were victims of conscriptionist vindictiveness and class prejudice".

The editor of The Australian Worker, Henry Boote, responded to the verdicts with a trenchant critique of the trial and Justice Pring, describing him as a "bigoted capitalistic judge". The article, published on 7 December with the headline 'Guilty, or Not Guilty?', was a rallying call to the labour movement as exemplified by Boote's closing sentence: "Organised Labor especially should not rest until the prisoners are set free, or their criminality established on testimony less grotesque, less tainted, and less obviously twisted and distorted to the needs of an unscrupulous prosecution". Boote had been a prominent publicist for the 'No' case during the conscription campaign. His intervention on behalf of the convicted IWW men encouraged their sympathisers and exposed the issue to the wider labour movement. Boote followed up with another article a week later arguing that the case against Donald Grant, who had been sentenced to fifteen years imprisonment, deserved special attention. In the article he described the case as "one of the most ghastly atrocities that the Law has ever been guilty of".

In late December 1916 Boote and John Bailey, the president of the Australian Workers' Union and registered proprietor of The Australian Worker, were instructed to show cause "why they should not be committed to prison for alleged contempt of court". The application, made by Justice Gordon, submitted that the 14 December article "was objectionable and punishable as being an attack upon the judge and jury, and that such article contained comments which amounted to a contempt of court as tending to interfere with the due course of justice". In a judgment of the New South Wales Full Court in March 1917 no order was made in the case of alleged contempt of court, except that the respondents were required to pay the costs of the proceedings.

The arrests and trial of the twelve IWW men had occurred against the backdrop of a split in the federal Labor party over the conscription issue. Hughes and his supporters were expelled from the party in November 1916, but he was able to remain in power at the head of the new National Labor Party. On 15 December 1916 Prime Minister Hughes introduced the 'Unlawful Associations' legislation into the federal parliament, which sought to declare the Industrial Workers of the World an "unlawful association" and membership of the IWW made a summary offence punishable by six months' imprisonment. A further provision authorised the deportation of members who were not Australian born. The Labor Party in opposition were uncertain about their response to such an oppressive measure which threatened freedom of speech, but overt support for the IWW at that time was determined to be an electoral liability. In the end the Labor Party criticised the legislation and then voted in its favour. In the few months after the IWW was declared an "unlawful association", twelve foreign-born members were deported from Australia and 103 IWW members served gaol terms. Many more were also sacked from their jobs. The IWW reaction to the declaration of illegality was to change the name of the organisation to the 'Workers' Defence and Release Committee' and continued with their activities, including the publication of Direct Action.

The union movement responded quickly to the convictions of the IWW prisoners. In Sydney, on a motion by Ernie Judd of Municipal Workers Union, the Labor Council resolved to send a deputation to the parliamentary Labor Party requesting the appointment of a Royal Commission to inquire into the conduct of the IWW cases. The Trades Hall Council in Melbourne also supported a Royal Commission and in Brisbane the Industrial Council affiliated with the local IWW Release Committee. By the end of March 1917 the Defence and Release Committee had collected over a thousand pounds to support the families of the prisoners and to campaign for their release.

In May 1917 the federal government withdrew the permit allowing Direct Action to be transmitted by post, despite which the newspaper continued to be published, distributed by IWW sympathisers. In July 1917 the government amended the 'Unlawful Associations Act' to allow the declaration of illegality to be extended to any association whose purposes were proscribed by the Act. Other clauses specified six-month sentences for membership, for printing or distributing publications and for raising or contributing funds to an illegal organisation. The legislation also allowed for the seizure of property and publications "belonging to an unlawful association". After the amendments became law the Workers' Defence and Release Committee was proclaimed an illegal organisation. In August the police raided the IWW offices in Sussex Street and seized the final issue of Direct Action and its printing press, and sealed the building. An article in the final confiscated issue of Direct Action, 18 August 1917, described prime minister Hughes as "that little man, full of energy in the service of the master class" who had "put the I.W.W. out of business by outlawing our organisation". The article was resolute, calling on workers to "stand solidly together in defiance of capitalist tyranny".

== The appeal ==
The appeal of the twelve IWW men, lodged on 8 December 1916, opened before the Court of Criminal Appeal on 26 February 1917. The grounds for the appeal were that the verdict was against the evidence, the sentences were excessive and that Justice Pring had misdirected the jury on the question of whether McAlister and the Goldsteins were accomplices and on the matter of alibis. The judgement of the court was delivered on 10 March, which on the whole upheld Pring's rulings. In only two cases the verdicts of the jury were found to be in error. The convictions of McPherson and Glynn of conspiracy to procure the release of Barker were quashed and their sentences were each reduced to ten years.

== The Royal Commissions ==
=== Justice Street ===
After the suppression of the IWW Henry Boote of The Australian Worker continued to argue strongly that the prosecution case against the twelve IWW prisoners was deeply flawed. He was the author of pamphlets in June and July 1917 questioning the evidence given by witnesses for the Crown. Boote was just one of a number of leading agitators for justice for the IWW twelve. Ernie Judd was appointed by the Labor Council as an investigator into the case of the twelve convicted IWW prisoners and he worked vigorously for their release, along with Jock Garden, the secretary of the Labor Council. The leading political voice in support of the release of IWW twelve was Percy ('Jack') Brookfield, the member for Sturt (centred around Broken Hill) in the New South Wales Legislative Assembly. Brookfield was a member of the Labor party until 1919, after which he held the seat as an independent labour member. Other Labor politicians were also prominent in their support for the release of the men, including Thomas Mutch, the member for the New South Wales seat of Botany, and Frank Anstey, the federal member for the electorate of Bourke in Melbourne.

In August 1918, after revelations were published about police informants in the case seeking more money, the Nationalist Party government of New South Wales appointed Justice Philip Street to conduct a Royal Commission to "inquire into certain charges made against members of the police force in respect of their conduct in connection with" the trial of the twelve IWW men. The Labor opposition was critical of the inquiry for being too narrow and unfair to the convicted men, being confined to the allegations against the police and failing to take account of the circumstances and evidence presented at the trial and new evidence discovered subsequently. The inquiry heard evidence from the police informants Scully, brought back from America at government expense, and Davis Goldstein. Justice Street's report was released on 16 December 1918, in which he concluded that the charges of police misconduct "have not been established as a fact" and that he had no doubt that the convicted men were guilty. Three days later the New South Wales Labor Council carried a motion expressing disapproval of the Justice Street's findings and condemning the New South Wales government "for refusing to grant Mr. Justice Street sufficient power to report as to whether the conviction of the I.W.W. men on the evidence before the jury was justifiable".

In response to Street's conclusions Boote began a series of seven detailed articles, published weekly in The Australian Worker, critically examining Street's report and analysing the evidence and allegations of bribery by the police. The collected articles were published as Set the 12 Men Free in late February 1919 by the Labor Council of New South Wales. In response to Boote's attack the New South Wales premier William Holman wrote a series of articles, published anonymously in The Sunday Times from late March 1919, criticising Boote's analysis of the case and dismissing "nearly the whole of the book" as "twaddle". Holman later had his Sunday Times articles re-issued as a publication titled The I.W.W. Prisoners: An Analysis of the Evidence at Their Trial and personally arranged to have copies distributed to houses in the electorate of Botany held by the Labor member Tom Mutch, a leading advocate for the release of the IWW prisoners.

=== The 1920 State election ===
In January 1920 the New South Wales Labor Council appointed a committee to lead a renewed agitation for the release of the twelve IWW men. The committee agreed to set up groups throughout the State, to distribute propaganda, arrange meetings and raise finance. In addition all Labor candidates at the forthcoming New South Wales general election would be requested to sign a pledge of support for the unconditional release of the IWW prisoners. At Broken Hill, the member for Sturt, Jack Brookfield, had left the Labor Party in 1919. He was standing as an independent labour candidate and, as a prominent supporter for the release of the IWW twelve, signed the pledge. In Sydney Patrick Minahan, a Labor candidate for the five-member Sydney electorate, also signed the pledge but was disendorsed by the Labor Party on the eve of the election, the party nervous that his candidature would negatively affect their electoral chances. Despite being disendorsed Minahan contested the election as an independent labour candidate and was elected as one of the five members for Sydney. When the results of the March 1920 general election were declared, the Labor Party had won forty-three of the ninety seats, thus requiring the support of three independent labour members to govern. For Brookfield and Minahan, their support was conditional on positive measures being carried out leading to the release from prison of the twelve IWW men. The new Labor government, led by John Storey, agreed to hold a Royal Commission.

=== Justice Ewing ===
In late April 1920 the Storey Labor government announced the appointment of Norman Ewing, a judge of the Supreme Court of Tasmania, to conduct the Royal Commission. Storey declared that "not a particle of relevant evidence shall be excluded" from the inquiry and promoted his selection of "an outside judge" as a demonstration of the government's impartiality. After negotiations with the Tasmanian government, Justice Ewing was commissioned in June 1920 to inquire into all aspects of the trial and sentences of the twelve IWW men.

Justice Ewing's inquiry opened on 21 June 1920, but was adjourned for a week before witnesses began to be heard. In all thirty witnesses were examined, eleven of whom had not previously appeared in any of the proceedings. On the first day Ewing explained that his conclusions may differ from those of Justice Street whose inquiry was "of a limited nature".

In his conclusions Justice Ewing considered each of the prisoners individually. The judge found that the convictions of six of the men – Teen, Hamilton, McPherson, Moore, Bessant and Fagin – were "not just and right" on any of the counts for which they were charged. Ewing found that Glynn, Larkin, Beattie and Grant had each been justly convicted only of seditious conspiracy, but the incarceration they had served was sufficient punishment. In the case of John Benjamin King, convicted of conspiracy to excite sedition, Ewing agreed that "stirring up dissension amongst the King's subjects" was "seditious in the technical sense", but considered that the sentence of five years, in addition to the two years he was serving for forgery, was "greatly in excess of the offence". Of the twelve men, it was only Charlie Reeve's conviction on two counts that Ewing concluded had been "just and right". In regard to the police conduct of the case, Ewing was not prepared to overrule Street's finding and rejected any suggestion that the men had been framed.

== Releases ==
On 31 July 1920, after Ewing's finding had been made public, the premier John Storey promised to "carry out the recommendations of the judge". The New South Wales cabinet met on 3 August and "decided to recommend that all the prisoners with the exception of Reeve and King, be released forthwith". King's case was being further considered because part of his sentence, for forgery, was under federal jurisdiction. The ten men were released from Long Bay Gaol in the late afternoon of the same day, greeted by the wives of Glynn, Teen and Larkin and leading agitators who had worked for their release. Three nights later their liberty was celebrated by their defenders and supporters at a crowded public meeting in Sydney's Town Hall.

Pressure from supporters for the release of King and Reeve continued, with the State government maintaining that King was serving a Commonwealth sentence and refusing to interfere with Ewing's decision in regard to Reeve. King had been granted remissions for "good conduct" and concessions after the war had ended, which meant he was due for release on 30 August 1921. The labour movement applied pressure to have Reeve released on the same day but the New South Wales government stood firm. Within three months however, the government relented. Charlie Reeve, the last of the twelve, was quietly released from Long Bay Gaol on 27 November 1921.^{[E]}

The New South Wales Labor Council met on 1 December 1921 and passed a motion of gratitude to Henry Boote, Ernie Judd and other members of the release committee, and resolved to write special letters of thanks to Jack Brookfield and the previous minister of justice, William McKell. In the Labor Council report for 1921 Jock Garden wrote: "The agitation for and the liberation of the twelve I.W.W. men is one of the greatest acts for the liberation of political prisoners that has been accomplished in any country of the world".

== The 'I.W.W. Twelve' ==
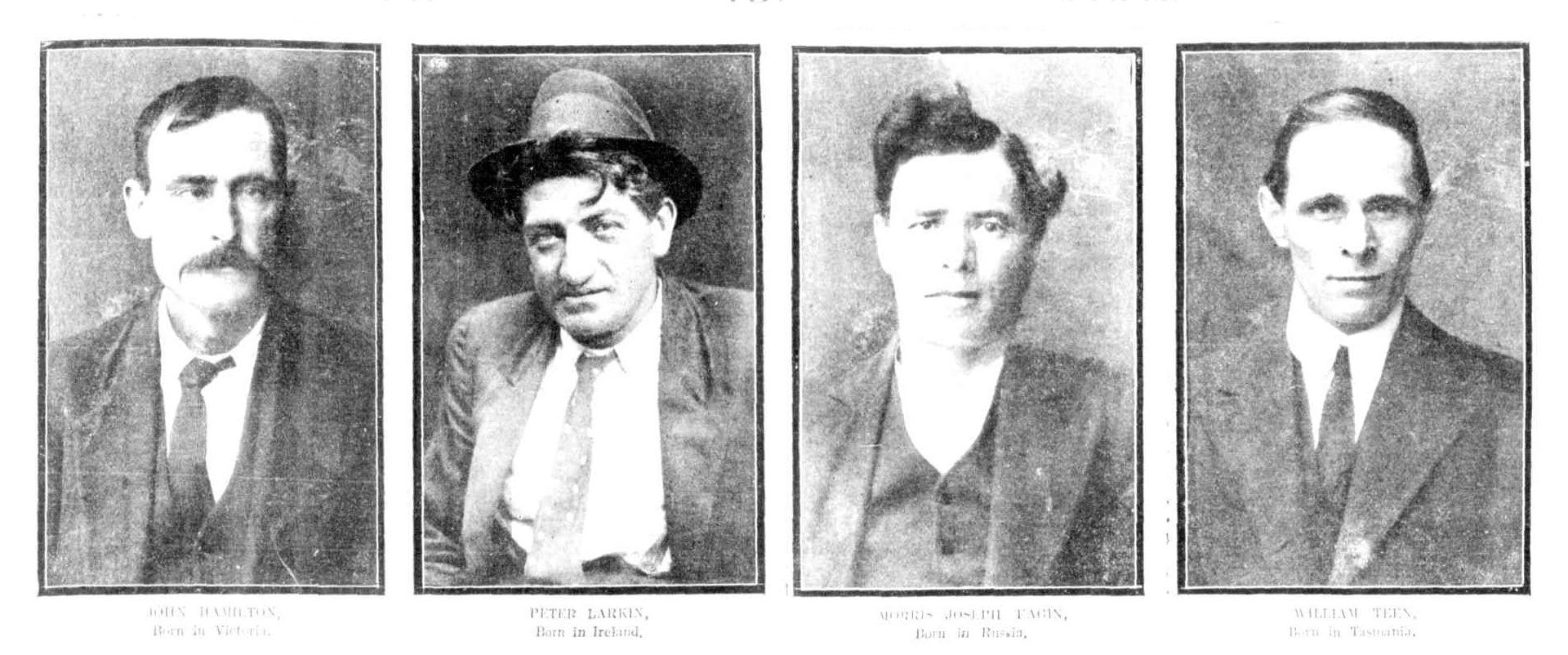
(left to right) John Hamilton, Peter Larkin, Morris Joseph Fagin and William Teen.

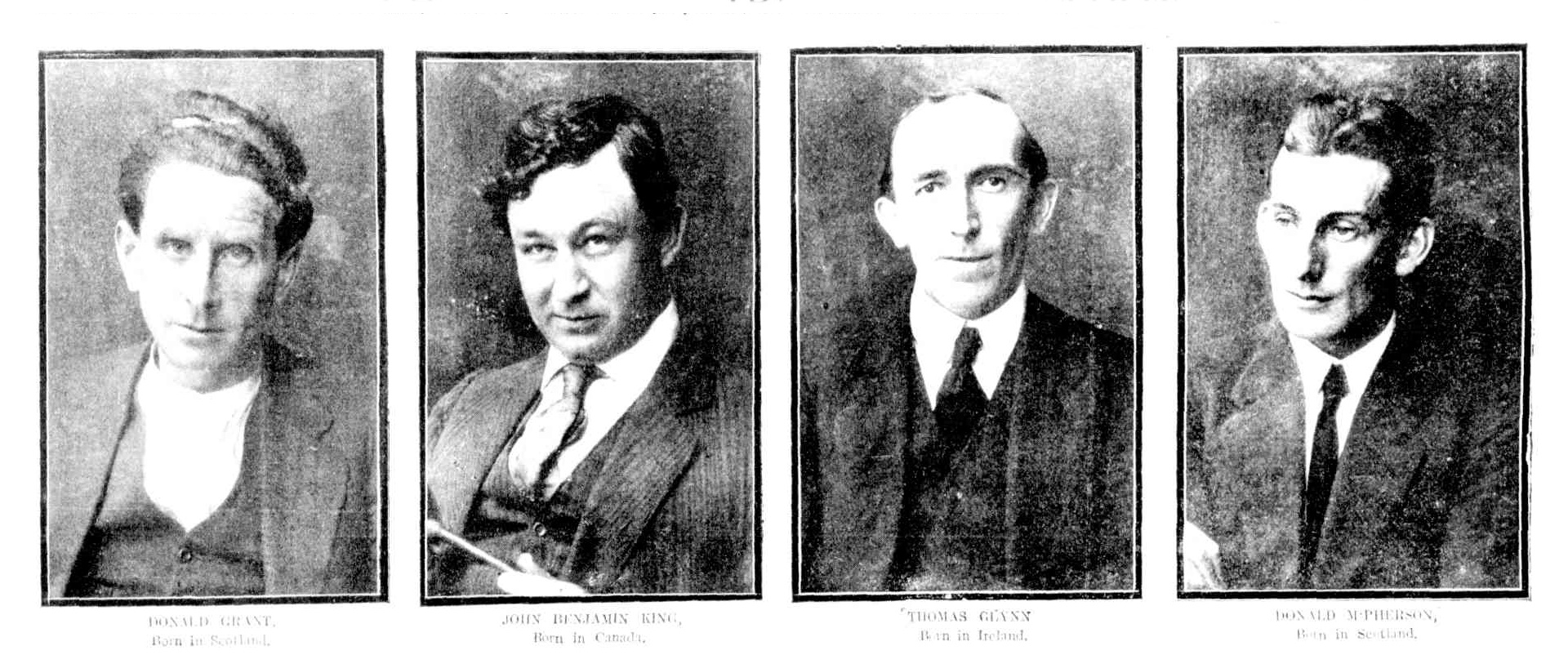
Donald Grant, John Benjamin King, Thomas Glynn and Donald McPherson.

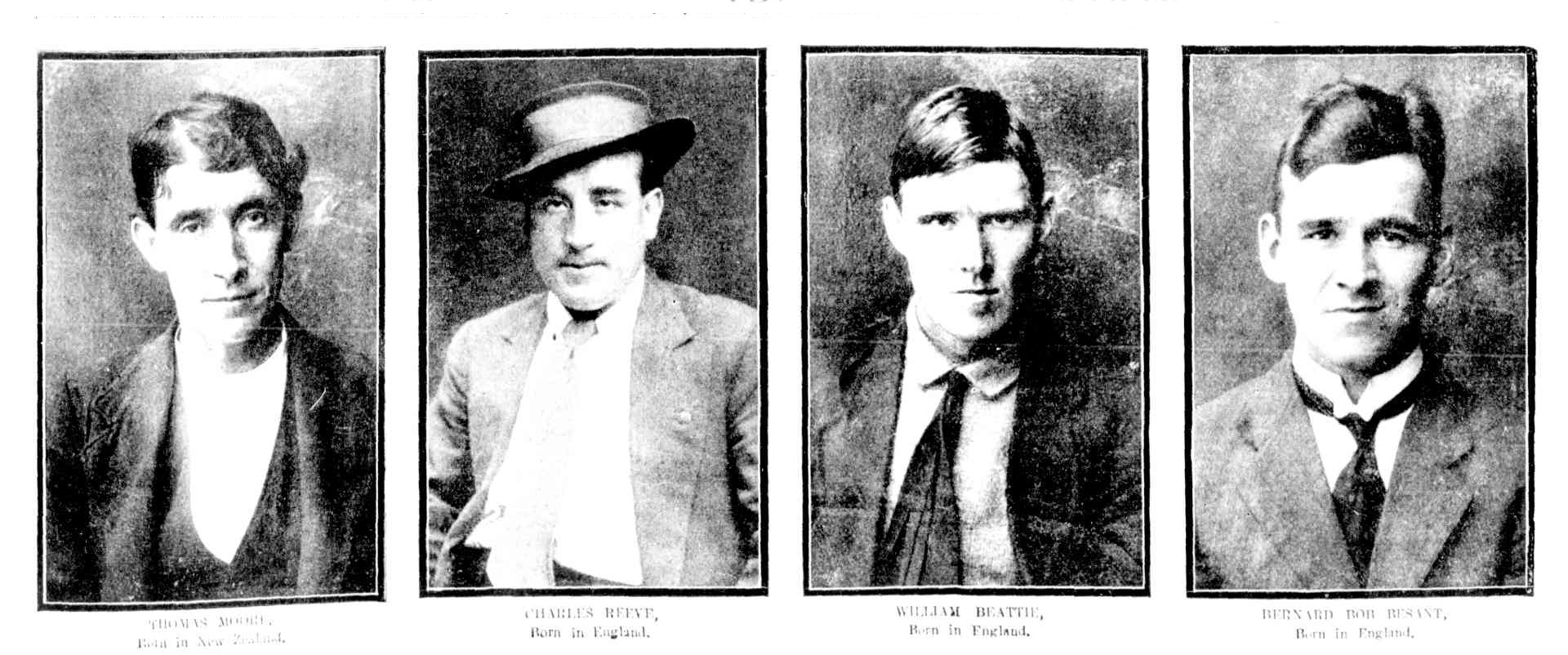
Thomas Moore, Charles Reeve, William Beattie and Bernard Bob Bessant.

- William (Bill) Beattie (or Beatty) was born in about 1886 in England; he arrived in New South Wales in 1909 aboard the Glen Doon; employed as a "wharf labourer". In the 1960s Beattie's reminiscences were taped by the Labor historian, Joe Harris, which were later published in Labor History, November 1967. In his latter years Beattie lived in North Queensland, and later settled in Brisbane where he died in 1972, aged about 86.
- Bernard Bob Bessant (or Besant) was born on 8 May 1893 at Southampton, county Hampshire in England, the son of John Thomas Bessant and Mary Grace (née Treglown). He arrived in Australia in 1912 aboard the Demosthenes; worked as a fitter and turner on the railways in Melbourne; arrived in Sydney in about June 1916. Bessant married Jean MacKay in 1922 in Sydney. In 1932 he stood as the Communist Party candidate for the Bulimba electorate in the Queensland Legislative Assembly. Bessant died of heart disease on 1 October 1941 at Newcastle, New South Wales, aged 48.
- Morris Joseph (Joe) Fagin (or Fagan), born at Mogilev, Belarus, in about 1875; worked as a dockyard worker and a glazier; died of empyemia on 12 July 1938 at North Sydney, aged about 53.
- Thomas (Tom) Glynn was born on 6 January 1881 at Clogh in county Wexford, Ireland (also recorded as Clogh in county Kilkenny, and also county Galway), the son of John Glynn. Tom Glynn arrived in Australia aboard the Ophir in 1900. He served in the Second Boer War in South Africa with the Victorian Imperial Bushmen. Glynn later joined the Natal Mounted Police and served during the Bambatha Rebellion in 1906. He married Delia Rochford on 7 February 1905 at Johannesburg (two children, later divorced). Glynn was suspended from duty in the police force and imprisoned for refusing to shoot a Zulu boy. By 1907 Glynn was living in Wellington, New Zealand, and active in radical politics. By 1910 he had returned to South Africa where he worked on the trams in Johannesburg. Glynn became general secretary of the South African Industrial Workers Union and took a leading role in the 1911 tramway strike for which he was gaoled. He worked as a journalist and edited several issues of Voice of Labor run by the unionist Archie Crawford. In late 1911 Glynn left South Africa and made his way via Ireland to North America, where he joined the IWW, after which he worked his way as a stoker back to Australia in 1912. In Sydney he worked mainly as a tramway conductor. Glynn was also recorded as a blacksmith and a dock worker. He also worked as a journalist and from 1915 was editor of Direct Action. In 1916 he was secretary of the Sydney branch of the IWW. Amongst his colleagues Glynn was known as a scholar and "the intellectual of the bunch". Glynn married Alicia Faulkner in 1931 at Randwick (one daughter). He died of kidney disease on 3 December 1934 in Lidcombe Hospital at Lidcombe (western Sydney), aged 53.
- Donald Grant, was born on 26 February 1888 in Inverness, Scotland. He joined the Independent Labour Party in Britain. Grant arrived in Australia in 1910 and became a leading propagandist and orator for the I.W.W. He had travelled to Broken Hill to agitate against conscription where he was arrested on 29 September 1916. Grant was appointed to the New South Wales Legislative Council, serving from 1931 to 1940. He was elected to the Senate in 1944 and served until 1959. Grant died on 11 June 1970 in Sydney.
- John (Jack) Hamilton was born in Victoria in about 1873-4. He worked as a miner. By the early 1920s Hamilton was working as a fisherman on the North Coast of New South Wales. Hamilton died of a stroke on 7 February 1939 at Kogarah, a southern suburb of Sydney.
- John Benjamin King was born on 26 July 1870 at Vancouver in British Columbia, Canada (also recorded as Windsor, Ontario in Canada). He worked as a miner, teamster, stoker and engine driver. He joined the IWW on the American west coast and became an IWW organiser in Vancouver and Auckland, New Zealand. King arrived in Australia in 1911 where he became a leading propagandist and organiser for the IWW. In 1916 King was the registered publisher of the Direct Action newspaper. After his release from prison in August 1921 he helped to re-establish the Direct Action newspaper and joined the Communist Party of Australia (CPA). He worked as a boot-mender. During the 1930s King spent time in the Soviet Union and travelled in Australia as a Communist propagandist. By the 1940s he had become disillusioned and ceased to be a political organiser. King died on 14 October 1954 at Innisfail, Queensland, aged 84.
- Peter Larkin was born on 21 July 1880 at Toxteth Park in Liverpool, England, the son of Irish-born parents James Larkin and Mary Ann (née McNulty). His older brother was the Irish trade unionist Jim Larkin. Peter Larkin married the widow Annie Hay (née Traynor) on 15 February 1909 at Everton, a suburb of Liverpool. He arrived in Australia in about 1915 as a seaman, where he worked in mines at Broken Hill. He became a paid organiser for the Sydney branch of the Industrial Workers of the World. Larkin's wife and daughter arrived in Sydney in 1916. After his release from prison in August 1920 he became a foundation member of the Communist Party of Australia (CPA). In May 1922 Larkin was deported to the Britain, and became politically active in Ireland together with his brother Jim. He later spent time in the United States agitating for the release of his brother from prison. Larkin died on 15 May 1931 at Dublin, Ireland, aged 50.
- Donald (Don) McPherson was born in Scotland in about 1887. Worked as a wharf labourer. He was released from prison in August 1920 and was reported to be working as a seaman during the 1920s. In 1936 he appeared on a CPA platform with several of his IWW colleagues. Details of his death are unknown.
- Thomas Moore was born in about 1881 in New Zealand. At the time of his arrest he earned a casual living in Sydney as a kitchen-hand and stableman for racehorse trainers. After his release in August 1920, three years later it was reported he was living quietly in Sydney. Details of his death are unknown.
- Charles Thomas (Charlie) Reeve was born on 2 November 1887 in London, England, the son of John Reeve. He was a plumber. After experiencing the IWW in the United States, Reeve migrated to Sydney in 1907 where he worked as a bricklayer. In 1913 he was living in New Zealand, and served as secretary of the Auckland IWW. In 1915-6 he visited Broken Hill and localities in South Australia and Western Australia, addressing public meetings. After his release from prison in November 1921 he travelled to Western Australia, joined the CPA and worked as a union organiser. Reeve was back in Sydney by 1923. He was gaoled in 1926 for holding public meetings without police permission. Reeve lived with his partner, Carl Jensen, and opened a bookshop in Sydney in the 1930s. He died of influenza and chronic nephritis on 30 May 1942 at Gymea Bay, New South Wales, aged 64.
- William (Billy) Teen (or Tehan), was born on 9 November 1885 at Hobart, Tasmania, the son of Thomas Michael Tehan and Emma (née McPherson). He had moved to Sydney by 1913 where he worked as a hairdresser. Teen married Kathleen McPhee on 20 December 1913 at Darlinghurst in Sydney (two sons). He was released from Long Bay Gaol in August 1920. By 1927 he was living with his family at Paddington in Brisbane, working as a knitter. He later returned to Sydney, living at Redfern and working as a labourer and a motor driver. By 1943 he had returned to Hobart, working as a miner and labourer. Teen died on 3 December 1948 at Hobart, aged 63.

== Cultural resonances ==
The folksinger Andy Irvine composed a song memorialising the Sydney Twelve, called "Gladiators", released on a record in March 2001.

== Gallery ==
A selection of cartoons relating to the I.W.W. Twelve
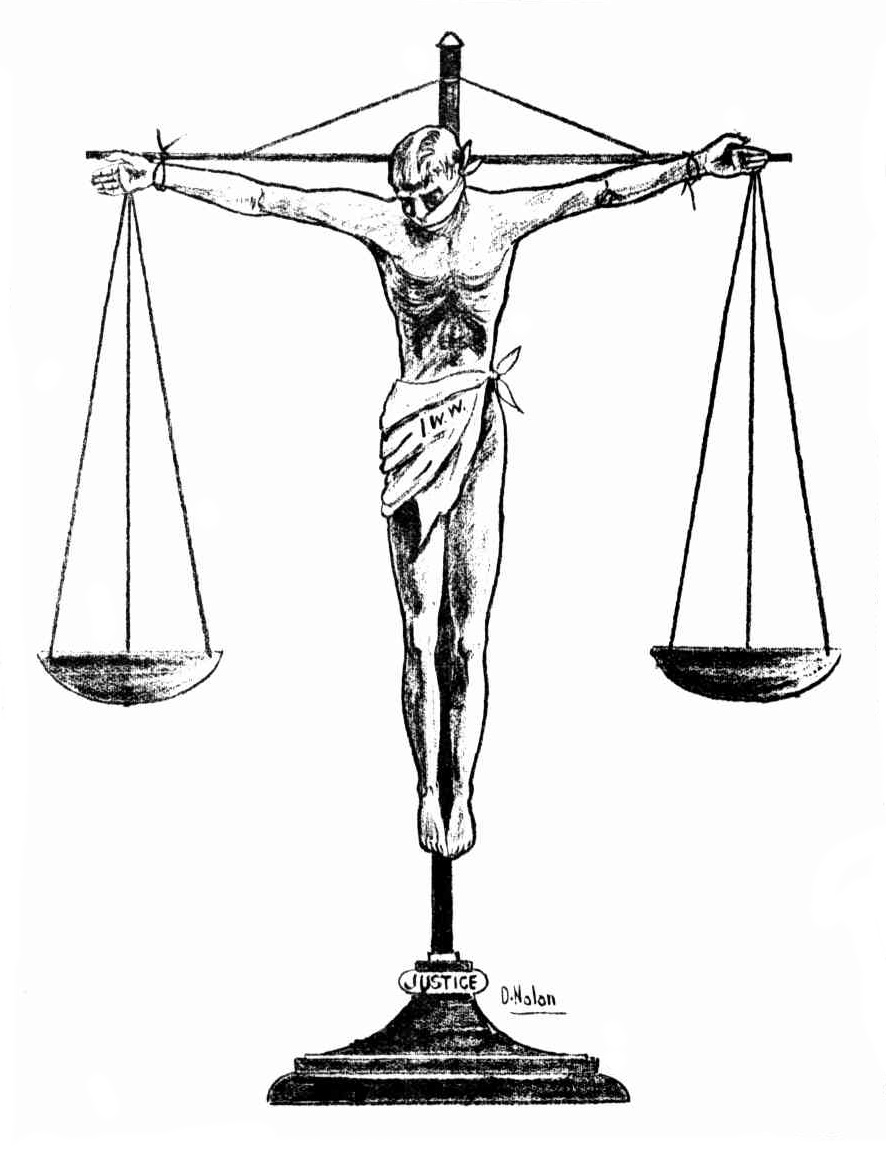
'Justice', a cartoon by D. Nolan, published in Direct Action, 23 December 1916, page 1.

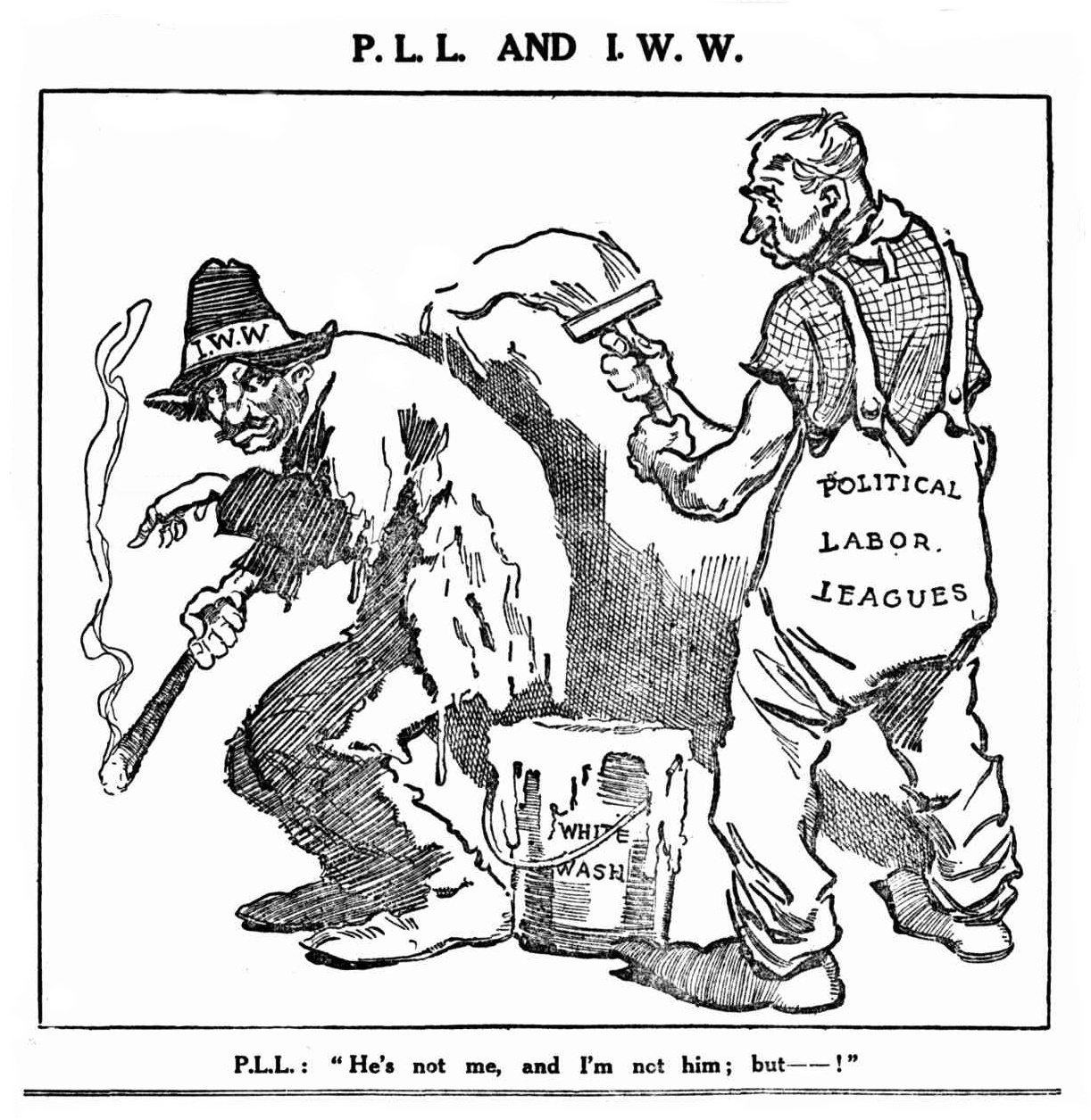
The conservative view: 'P.L.L. and I.W.W.', anonymous cartoon published in The Sunday Times, 10 December 1916.

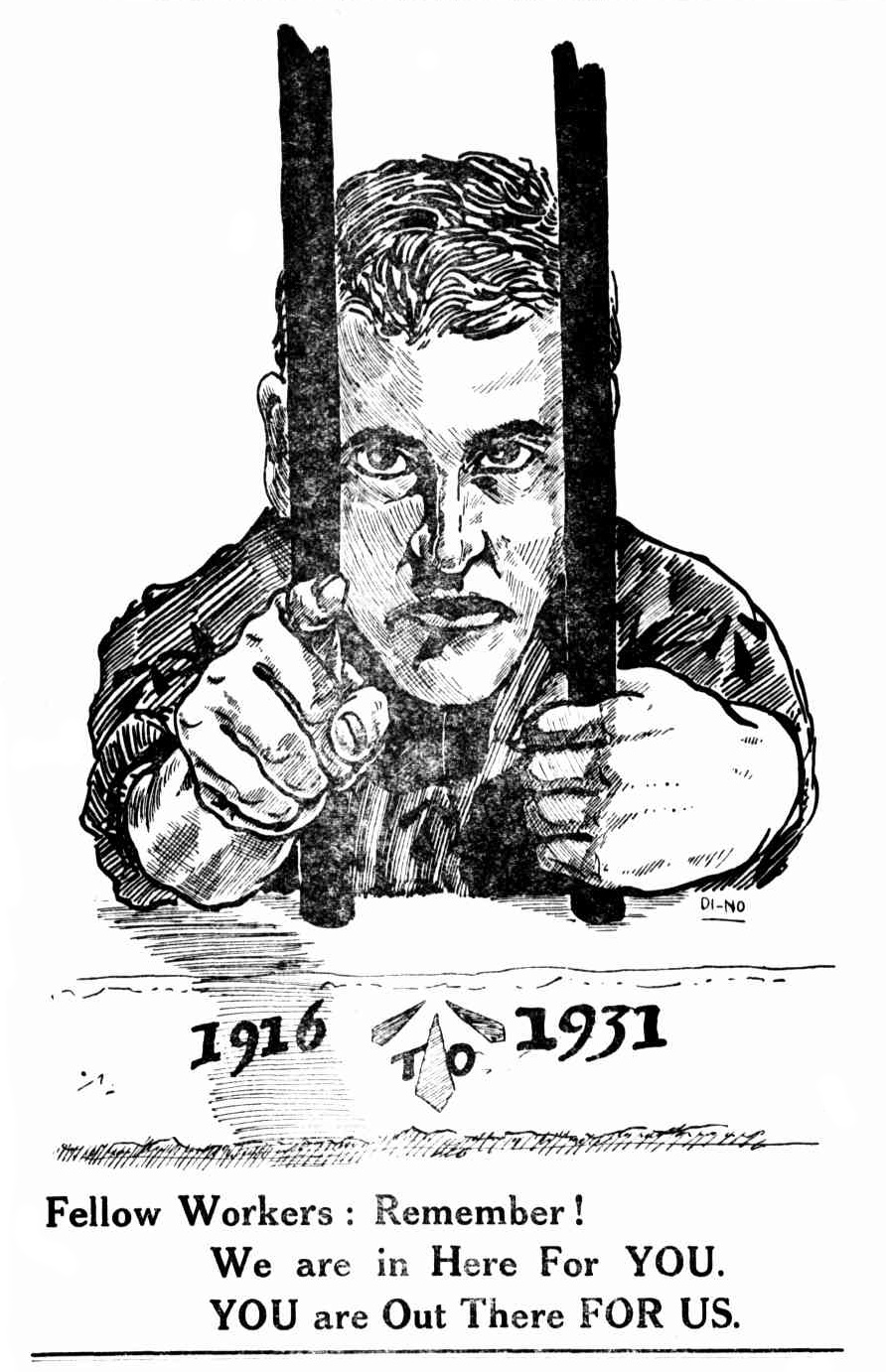
'1916 to 1931', a cartoon by 'Dino', published in Direct Action, 20 January 1917.

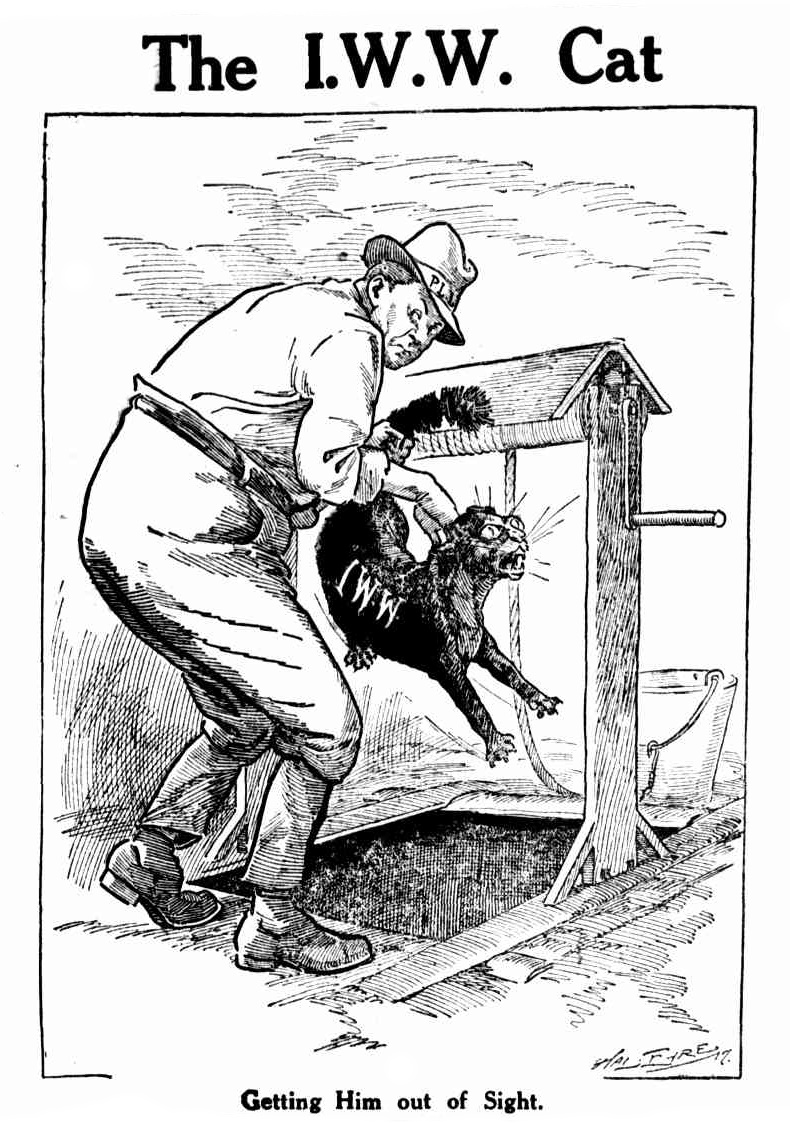
'The I.W.W. Cat: Getting Him Out of Sight', cartoon by Hal Eyre, published in The Bathurst Times, 22 March 1917.

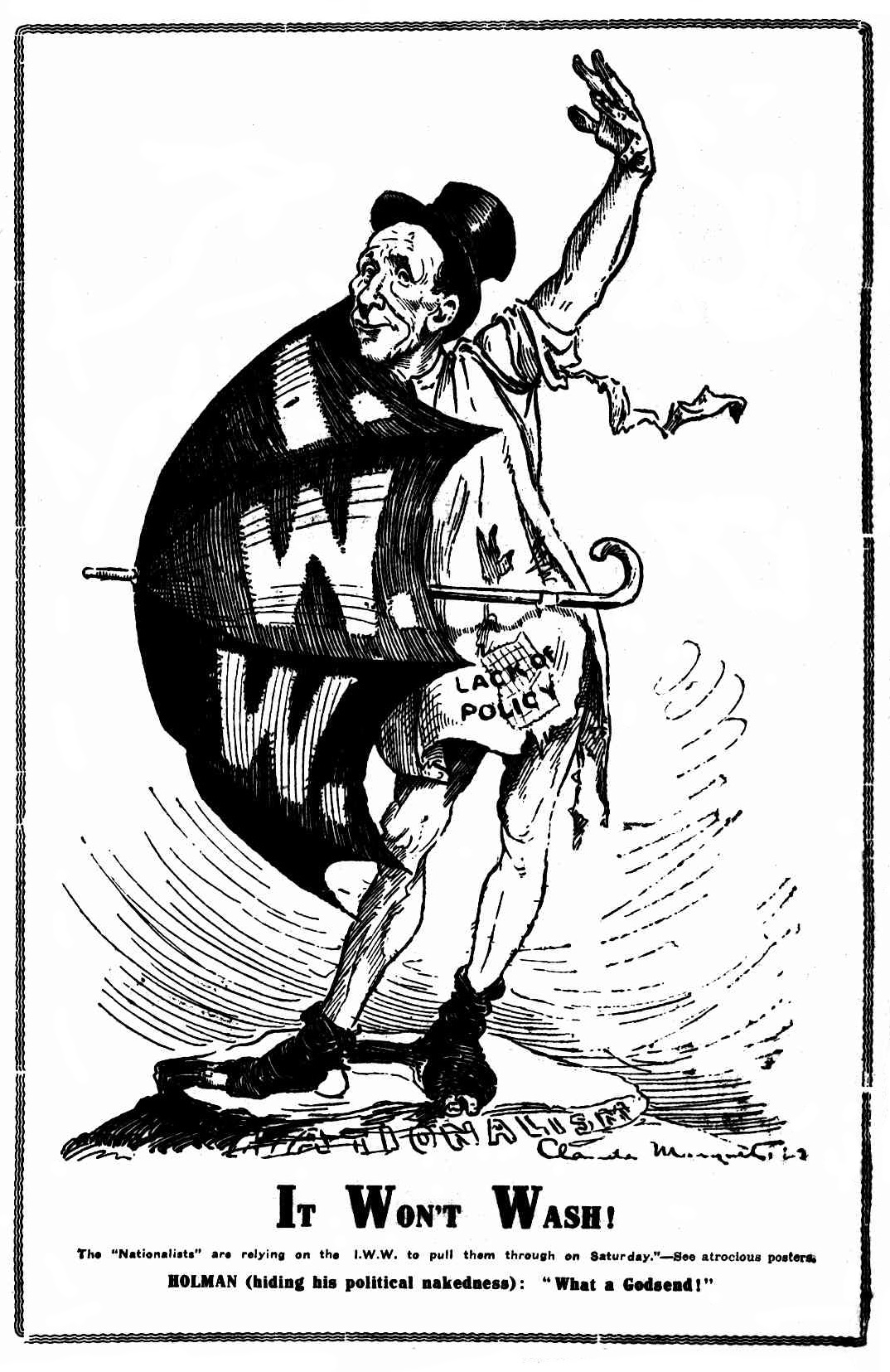
'It Won't Wash' (The Australian Worker, 22 March 1917), a cartoon by Claude Marquet featuring a caricature of William Holman.

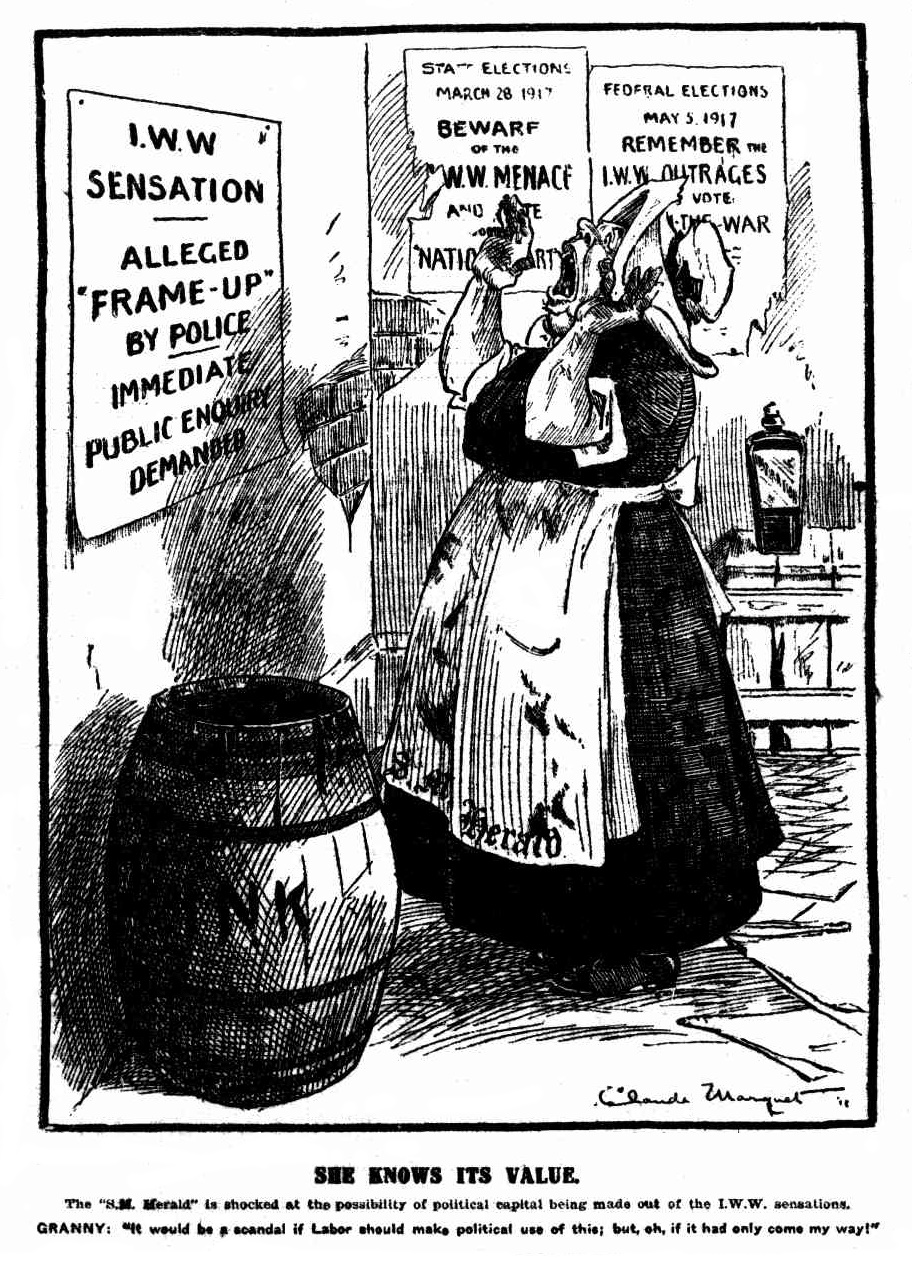
'She Knows Its Value' (The Australian Worker, 25 July 1918), a cartoon by Claude Marquet.

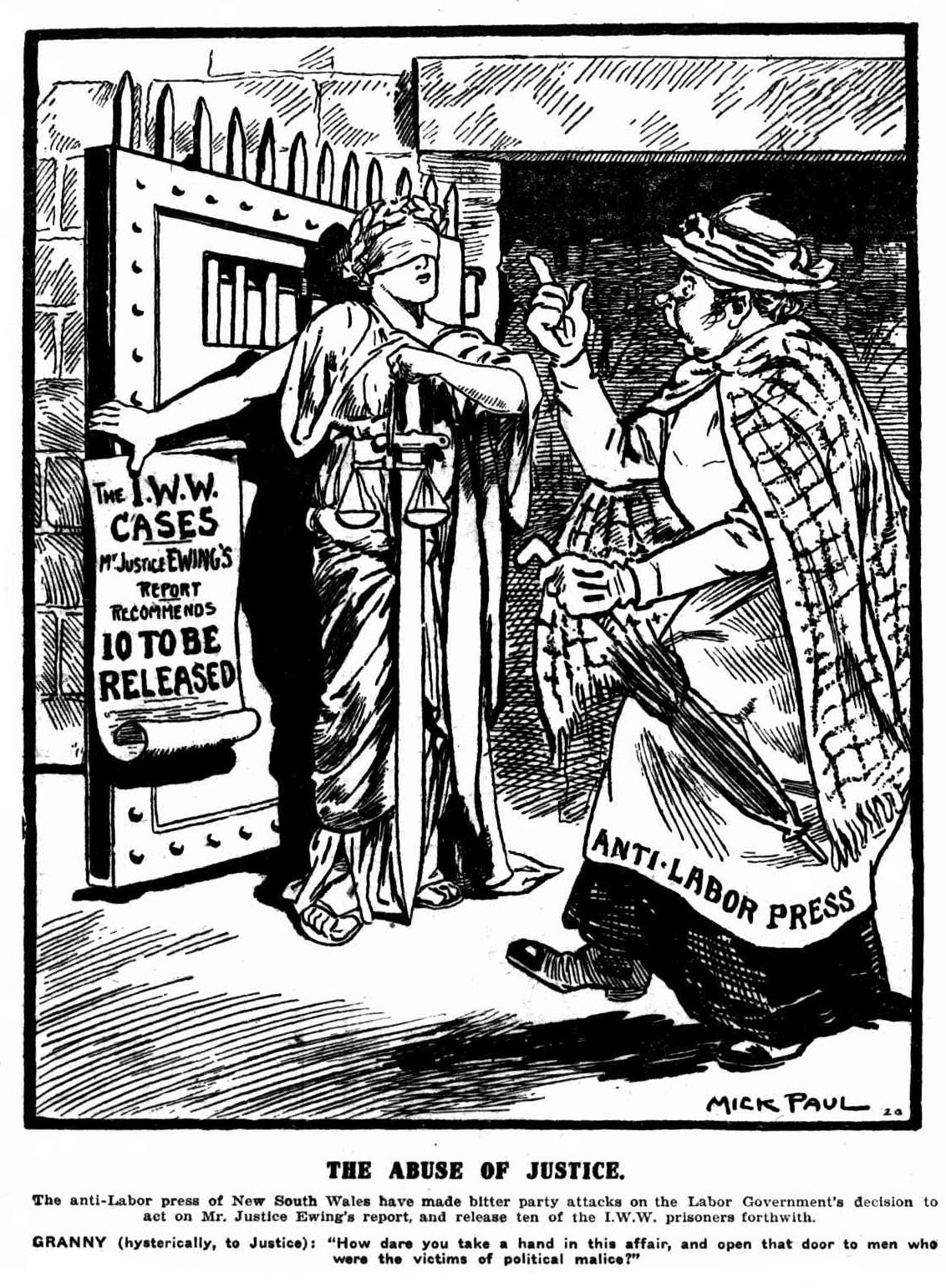
'The Abuse of Justice', a cartoon by Mick Paul, published in The Australian Worker, 5 August 1920.

== Notes ==
A. Prior to Barker's appeal and during his imprisonment members of the IWW made statements at public meetings and in articles published in Direct Action that were suggestive of subversion or sabotage. At a public meeting at the Sydney Domain on 2 April 1916 Donald Grant said: "For every day Barker is in jail it will cost the capitalists ten thousand pounds". An article in Direct Action, published after the dismissal of Barker's appeal, made reference to comments such as those made by Grant: "The I.W.W. has stated that directly or indirectly the capitalist class will be made to pay dearly for every minute of Barker's incarceration". The article also included more provocative statements: "Sabotage is a powerful weapon, wielded by the determined man who knows his business... you are called upon to strike a blow for Barker's release".

B. The men were charged with treason-felony under section 12 of the Crimes Act 1900 (NSW), legislation which incorporated the Treason Felony Act 1848 (Imp). Treason-felony is a statutory offence, focussing on the intention or preparation to commit treasonous acts, as opposed to treason which requires overt acts of national betrayal such as armed rebellion, political violence, assisting foreign enemies during wartime or attempting to overthrow the government.

C. On 16 October, the final day of committal hearing against the twelve IWW accused men in Sydney, Detective-sergeant Devlin presented evidence, during which he disclosed that in late September he had been at Tottenham investigating the murder of Constable Duncan, for which members of the local IWW branch had been arrested as suspects. When asked what relevance his evidence had to the case, Devlin explained that he had found letters from both Fagin and King, as well as copies of the Direct Action newspaper.

D. John Benjamin King had been one of five men indicted on charges of forging and uttering five pound banknotes. Two of the men pleaded guilty and the other three, including King, pleaded not guilty. The trial of the three men commenced at the Sydney Quarter Sessions on 23 October before Judge Docker. The trial concluded after four days, with the jury delivering guilty verdicts for each of the three men. King was sentenced to imprisonment for three years. King successfully appealed against his forgery conviction, which was heard before a full court on 20 December 1916. His appeal was mainly based on the ground that there was no corroboration of evidence presented by an accomplice at the trial. King's conviction was set aside and a new trial ordered. King was re-tried on the forgery charge in March 1917. Despite a recommendation of mercy by the judge he was found guilty by the jury and his sentence was reduced to two years. King's solicitor at the trial "said that his client had not been in any trouble until the wave of hysteria passed over the country on a certain political question".

E. The condition of Reeve's release was that he submit to remain under police surveillence until November 1926.

== See also ==
- Australian Sedition Law
