= Way Out Yonder (Andy Irvine album) =

Studio album by Andy Irvine
- Released: January 2000
- Recorded: July – December 1999
- Studio: Éaníní Studio, County Kildare
- Genre: Irish folk
- Length: 51:09
- Label: Andy Irvine (Ireland)
- Producer: Andy Irvine, Steve Cooney

Andy Irvine chronology
Rain on the Roof (1996)	Way Out Yonder (2000)	Abocurragh (2010)

Way Out Yonder is an album by Andy Irvine, recorded between July and December 1999 and released in January 2000. It was co-produced by Irvine and Steve Cooney.

== Recording ==
This album opens with "Gladiators", a self-penned song celebrating the life of Tom Barker who was editor of the Industrial Workers of the World's newspaper, Direct Action just before, during and after the first world war. He led an effective campaign against the Australian government of William Morris Hughes' plans to introduce conscription.

"Moreton Bay" is an Australian convict ballad about the brutality meted out by captain Patrick Logan, commander of Moreton Bay penal colony between 1826 and 1830. When he was killed by a party of Aboriginal hunters, the convicts rejoiced at the news of his death.

"They'll Never Believe it's True/Froggy's Jig" is an amusing tale during which, late one night, Irvine chances upon a procession headed by an old and creaky piper, leading to a Faerie building site. After being invited to join the dance and perform, he receives his trademark green plectrum from the Faerie Queene herself, "but they'll never believe it's true".

"The Girl I Left Behind", is a song from Sam Henry's collection. It tells the story of a young man who emigrates from Ireland to Glasgow in search of work but can't forget the sweetheart he left behind, even though he later discovers she married another. He then decides to travel farther afield and eventually finds love in New York, while never able to forget the girl who perjured her vows.

"Way Out Yonder" is an instrumental Bulgarian tune Irvine received from many people who had sent him cassettes over the years. The lead melodies are performed by Nikola Parov on gadulka, Brendan Power on harmonica and Rens van der Zalm of fiddle.

"The Highwayman" is Alfred Noyes's long poem set to new music by Loreena McKennitt and this is Irvine's adaptation of her song.

"When the Boys Are on Parade" is a song written by Marcus Turner from Dunedin in New Zealand. It reflects on the ambivalence of antimilitarists when confronted with the horrors of war.

"On a Distant Shore" is an instrumental written by Irvine, with Declan Masterson on low whistle and pipes.

The album closes with "Born in Carrickfergus". It is a poignant song written by Irvine and inspired by the childhood memories of Adrian Jefferies, a Catholic who grew up in mainly Protestant East Antrim during the Troubles in the 1970s.

== Track listing ==
All tracks composed by Andy Irvine; except where noted.

1. "Gladiators" – 6:30
2. "Moreton Bay" (Traditional; arranged by Andy Irvine) – 6:10
3. "They'll Never Believe It's True"/"Froggy's Jig" (Steve Cooney, A. Irvine) / (Irvine) – 5:01
4. "The Girl I Left Behind" (New words and music: Andy Irvine) – 5:00
5. "Way Out Yonder" (Traditional; arranged by Andy Irvine, Nikola Parov and Rens van der Zalm) – 3:45
6. "The Highwayman" (Alfred Noyes, Loreena McKennitt) – 9:16
7. "When The Boys Are On Parade" (Marcus Turner) – 4:40
8. "On A Distant Shore" – 4:48
9. "Born in Carrickfergus" – 6:46

== Personnel ==
- Andy Irvine – Vocals, bouzouki, mandolin, hurdy-gurdy, harmonica
- Rens van der Zalm – guitar, fiddle, mandolin, Bulgarian tambura, bass guitar
- Lindsey Horner – double bass
- Máire Breatnach – viola
- Cormac Breatnach – Low whistle
- Dermot Byrne – accordion
- Steve Cooney – Spanish guitar, percussion, kalimba
- Declan Masterson – Uilleann pipes, low whistle
- Liam O'Flynn – Uilleann pipes, tin whistle
- Nikola Parov – Gadulka
- Brendan Power – harmonica
- Lynn Kavanagh, Mandy Murphy, Callery – backing vocals

Recorded and mixed at Éaníní Studio, County Kildare between July and December 1999.
Produced by Andy Irvine and Steve Cooney. Engineered by Steve Cooney.
Mixed by Ed Kenehan, Steve Cooney and Andy Irvine.
Mastered by Ed Kenehan, at Trevor Hutchinson's Studio, Dublin.
