= Tom Barker (trade unionist) =

New Zealand tram conductor, trade unionist and socialist

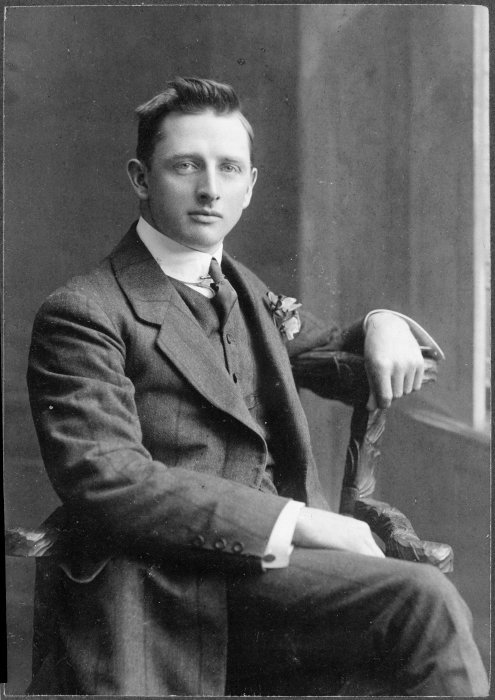
Barker c. 1912

Tom Barker (3 June 1887 – 2 April 1970) was a New Zealand tram conductor, trade unionist, and socialist. He was born in Crosthwaite, Westmorland, England. He was a leading member of the Industrial Workers of the World (IWW) and politician in New Zealand and Australia and the editor of the IWW paper Direct Action,.

== Early life ==
Barker was the eldest son of farm worker Thomas Grainger Barker and his wife Sarah, née Trotter. As a boy, he worked on the farm until the age of 11 years and then in a milking parlor until he was 14 years old. He then went to Liverpool and, in 1905, joined the British military, in a cavalry regiment. However, due to growing health problems with the strength of his heart, he was discharged soon from the army and worked in Liverpool on the rail-road.

In 1909, he emigrated to New Zealand, and worked in Auckland as a conductor on the trams. He married Bertha Isaakovna, a Polish-born ballet dancer.

== Politics ==
=== New Zealand ===
In New Zealand, he became an active trade unionist and secretary of the New Zealand Socialist Party. In 1913, he joined the IWW and brought a Marxist influence to the political orientation of the Industrial Workers of the World (IWW) for a more socialist perspective. In 1913 he mobilized the IWW for the Auckland General Strike and was arrested for conspiracy in Wellington in 1913. He was released in 1914 by paying a bail to the amount of £1500.

=== Australia ===
At the beginning of 1914 he went to Sydney and took the post of editor for the IWW magazine Direct Action. There he championed the rights of colored workers and fought for equal wages for coloreds and for women. The Australian Workers Union (AWU) had refused to organize with coloreds, despite their solidarity with the AWU. He spoke out against the AWU's actions, stating: "The Class War is a nobler sentiment than the Race War, for it strives for the abolition of chains and not for their perpetuation." He also sought to unite feminists with labor movements, believing gender warfare to be a misguided ruse when women should be protesting alongside men in the streets. In 1915, he was sentenced to 12 months in prison for conspiracy and released after a public campaign in March 1916. After his arrest, Donald Grant publicly stated: "For every day that Tom Barker is in jail it will cost the capitalist class £10,000".

In 1916, with enthusiasm for Australia's participation in World War I spreading through the ruling government, opinion was still deeply divided and political life dominated by the debate on conscription, the anti-war movement "NO", and by political gridlock and the arrests of trade unionists accused as conspirators under Australian Prime Minister Billy Hughes, who founded the Nationalist Party.

Barker protested and marched for twelve arrested trade unionists of the IWW, the so-called Sydney Twelve, which were charged with conspiracy. Many believed they were framed for their anti-war and anti-conscription views. The unionists were found to be in violation of the Unlawful Associations Act (1916), an initiative the Federal Parliament adopted in December 1916 under the Hughes cabinet, which considered certain IWW members to be involved in a conspiratorial organization. They were also charged with being involved in series of arson and a counterfeiting scheme. He led numerous organizations around the globe to protest these charges and petition the government to change its decision, although these efforts proved fruitless.

Barker designed and published the famous Australian anti-war and anti-conspiracy poster stating: TO ARMS !! Capitalists, Parsons, Politicians, Landlords, Newspaper Editors, and Other Stay-at-Home Patriots. Your Country Needs You in the Trenches! Workers, Follow Your Masters!.

Another poster, also attributed to Barker and distributed, shows a crucified soldier on a cannon while "Mr. Fat" fills his glass with war profits. This poster caused his arrest and the imposing of a prison sentence. He was released in 1918 and deported from the country on the first ship that would take him - a ship bound for Santiago, Chile.

=== Abroad ===
In Chile and Argentina, he organized maritime workers unions into strikes for better conditions and wages. He began cooperating and working with Soviet ambassadors and liaisons, building rapport with the Soviet Union. The Soviets recruited him to aid in their Kuzbass Autonomous Industrial Colony project in which they would experiment Workers' control. He enlisted technicians in the United States until 1926 to join the project. Later he worked for a Soviet oil company.

From 1930 to 1931, Barker lived in Australia and then went to the United Kingdom, where he worked as an employee of an electric power company London. As a member of the British Labour Party, he was elected a councillor on St Pancras Metropolitan Borough Council. When he was later elected mayor, Barker reportedly raised a red flag. He remained politically active until around the age of 70. Barker died in London, at the age of 83.

== In popular culture ==
Barker is one of the six Australians whose war experiences are presented in The War That Changed Us, a four-part television documentary series about Australia's involvement in World War I.

Barker became a popular figure internationally for working class movements. His name has been used on occasion in songs of the labor movement. In the song "Gladiators", which was sung by Andy Irvine on the album Way Out Yonder, the life and political work of Barker is discussed in great detail.

== Literature ==
- Eric Fry: "Barker, Tom (1887 - 1970)". Douglas Pike (Hrsg.): Australian Dictionary of Biography. Volume 7: 1891 - 1939. A - Ch. Melbourne University Press, Carlton Victoria 1979, ISBN 0-522-84185-6, S. 174–175.

Civic offices
Preceded by Trevor Jack Redman	Mayor of St Pancras; 1958–1959	Succeeded by Harold Percival Bastie
