= Henry Ernest Boote =

Australian writer (1865–1949)

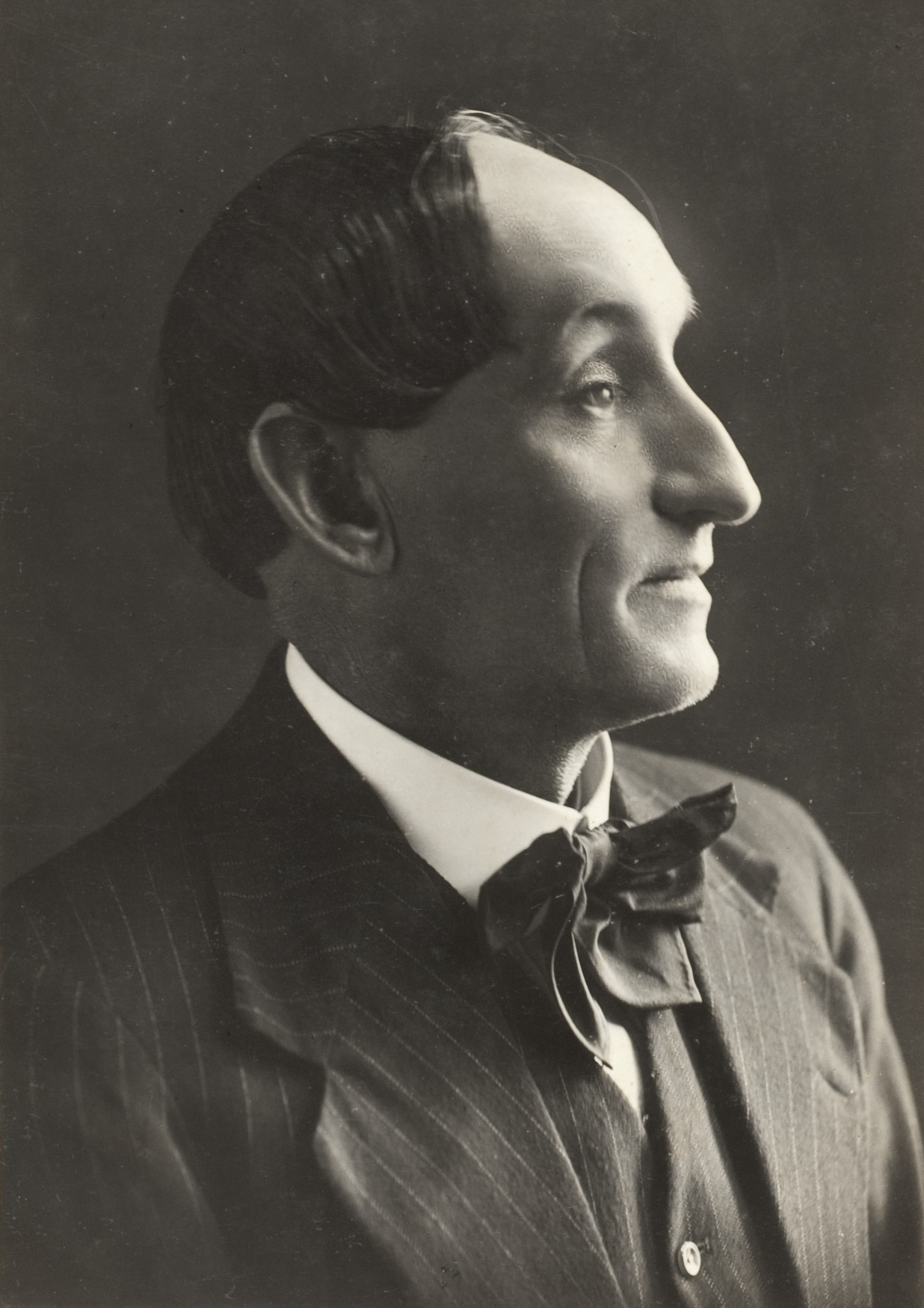
- Boote, c. 1920
- Born: 20 May 1865; Liverpool, England
- Died: 14 August 1949 (aged 84); Rose Bay, New South Wales, Australia
- Occupation: Writer
- Writing career
- Pen name: Touchstone

Signature
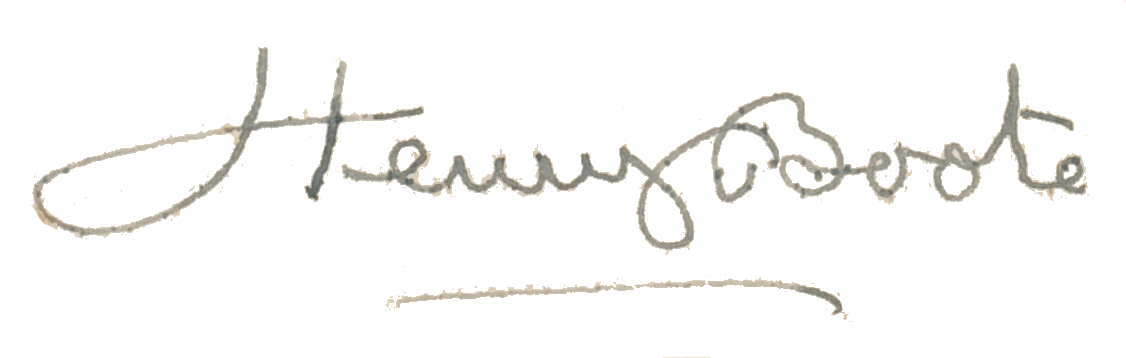

Henry Ernest Boote (20 May 1865 – 14 August 1949) was an Australian writer. A socialist, he wrote political and allegorical novels, essays, and poems.

Boote emigrated to Australia from England in 1889 and worked as a compositor in Brisbane. From 1894, he worked as an editor of several regional newspapers associated with the Queensland labour movement. He edited Brisbane's The Worker newspaper from 1902. In 1911, Boote relocated to Sydney and joined the staff of The Australian Worker, owned and operated by the Australian Workers' Union (AWU). He was appointed editor in 1914 and remained in that position until his retirement in 1943.

== Biography ==
=== Early years ===
Boote was born on 20 May 1865, in Liverpool, the eldest of six children born to Joseph Henry Boote and Elizabeth (née Jolley) Boote. His father had started a business as a mercer after leaving the Army, assisted by funds from his stepfather. Henry later recorded that the business eventually failed due to his father's "convivial habits". He was educated at Liverpool Public School.

Boote left school aged ten years and found a job in a printery, a position known as a 'printer's devil', performing tasks such as mixing ink and fetching type. He later served his apprenticeship as a compositor. He continued his education by reading "serious books" in local free libraries and developed an interest in sketching and painting. Later Boote attended art classes at the Royal Academy and the British Museum. By about 1885, he sold some of his pictures to a Liverpool art dealer. The dealer engaged Boote to copy pictures hanging at the Walker Art Gallery and later sent him to Wales to paint "from nature". When the art dealer left for South Africa, Boote returned to work in the printing trade. He was a member of the Liverpool branch of the Manchester Typographical Union.

=== Brisbane ===
Boote emigrated to the Australian colony of Queensland in 1889. He sailed from London aboard the R.M.S. Orient in early March and arrived at Sydney on 18 April 1889. While the vessel "was laying in Sydney Harbour", Boote was "engaged under agreement" by an agent of the Master Printers' Association for work at the Brisbane printing office of Messrs. Warwick and Sapsford.^{[A]} The Orient returned to England via Melbourne, so Boote travelled from Sydney to Brisbane aboard an inter-colonial steamer. On the day after his arrival in Brisbane, Boote went to the Trades Hall and met with the Secretary of the Queensland Typographical Association, Albert Hinchcliffe. He presented his clearance from the Manchester Typographical Union to Hinchcliffe, together with a letter of introduction and recommendation from the Liverpool branch secretary. Boote's application to join the Queensland Typographical Association (QTA) was considered at a special meeting of the union management on 25 May, with a representative of the employees at Warwick and Sapsford being present. Boote was admitted provisionally as a member "pending inquiries". He was formally admitted as a member of the QTA at its regular monthly meeting on 8 June 1889. The business premises of Warwick and Sapsford was located in Adelaide Street in Brisbane.

On 6 October 1889, Boote married Mary Jane Paingdestre, with whom he had three children. By early 1911, he had separated from his wife, but they did not divorce.

Boote had two oil paintings exhibited in the fine art section of the 1891 Exhibition in Brisbane of the National Agricultural and Industrial Association of Queensland. His painting were titled 'Before the Daily Toil Begins' and 'The St. Lucia Reach', with the latter being described as "an exceptionally good piece of work".

In 1892, Boote was recorded as being employed as a compositor, living at Tillot Street near Boggo Road Gaol in Dutton Park, Brisbane. Boote was recorded as being a "prominent South Brisbane draughts player". He sometimes represented the firm of Warwick and Sapsford in draughts matches against employees of other businesses.

Boote's first published articles appeared in Brisbane's The Worker newspaper, the official journal of the Australian Labour Federation.^{[B]} After trouble amongst the employees where he worked, Boote was invited by the editor of The Worker to write about the situation in his workplace. When Boote took it along to the newspaper office, the editor was impressed and suggested that he should write an article for the newspaper. Boote's first article was published in the issue of 9 September 1893. It was the first of what became a regular column called 'A Fool's Talk'. He later explained that "the spirit of the Labour Movement in the early nineties had seized upon him, and he had felt something stirring within him that claimed utterance". His 'A Fool's Talk' column, by 'Touchstone', appeared weekly during September and October 1893 and only occasionally after that.

=== Editorial positions ===
==== Bundaberg ====
In 1894, while employed at Messrs. Warwick and Sapsford, Boote applied for the position of editor of The Guardian newspaper in Bundaberg, a journal published by the Bundaberg Co-operative Printing and Publishing Co. Ltd. and with affiliation to the Labor Party.^{[C]} He was appointed to the position in September 1894 after a selection process involving two other applicants.

==== Gympie ====
In April 1896, Andrew Fisher lost the election for the seat of Gympie in the Queensland Legislative Assembly. Fisher had previously held one of the seats in the dual member electorate for the Australian Labor Party. His loss in 1896 was partly attributed to strong opposition from the local Gympie Times newspaper. To counter the influence of the Times, Fisher and a group of Labor party members floated a company (Truth Co. Ltd.) to establish a rival local journal named Truth (often referred to as the Gympie Truth). In early June 1896 it was reported that Boote would be the editor of the newly-established Truth newspaper at Gympie, described as a "new Labour paper". Fisher had asked Boote to relocate to Gympie to edit Truth, which was published bi-weekly from July 1896. A review of the new periodical described it as a "bright and promising journal", with a "rose-tinted" cover "resplendent with blue ink". The editor, Henry Boote, was described as "one of the ablest of the new cult of Queensland Labour pressmen, and besides being a strong but moderate and clever writer, he is witty and original". Boote and Fisher, together with George Ryland, a local union organiser, largely wrote and produced the newspaper. Boote was not only the editor, but also the reporter and advertisement canvasser, working for two pounds per week. Boote and Fisher (who later became prime minister of Australia) remained friends until Fisher's death in 1928.

In the lead-up to the Queensland colonial election in March 1899 Fisher did not seek formal endorsement as a candidate for Gympie by the Labor executive in Brisbane, but chose to fight the election locally. Both he and Ryland were elected for the seat of Gympie. At the declaration of the election results on 14 March the candidate who ran third in the poll by fifteen votes, the Gympie solicitor Francis I. Power, had some bitter words to say about the fairness of the election, specifically referring to a leaflet printed by the Truth which he described as "a tissue of lies reeking with venom". He quoted a section of the leaflet that read: "Do you believe in black labor and leprosy? then plump for Power" (a reference to the employment of workers from the Pacific Islands in sugar plantations). The solicitor's attack focussed on Boote, as the editor, who replied: "I am the author and I am proud of it".

Boote was a member of the Social Democratic Vanguard, formed in Brisbane in 1901 and described as a proto-syndicalist socialist organisation. The syndicalist agenda emphasised the primacy of industrial workers within the structure of society. Strike action was encouraged as a means of enforcing solidarity amongst workers and controlling the means of production in the process of achieving a post-capitalist society.

In August 1901, Boote resigned as editor of Gympie's Truth newspaper. In early September a "farewell social" was held for him at the Hibernian Hall at which he was presented with "a handsomely framed address" on behalf of the directors, shareholders and employees of Truth Co. Ltd.

==== Brisbane's The Worker ====
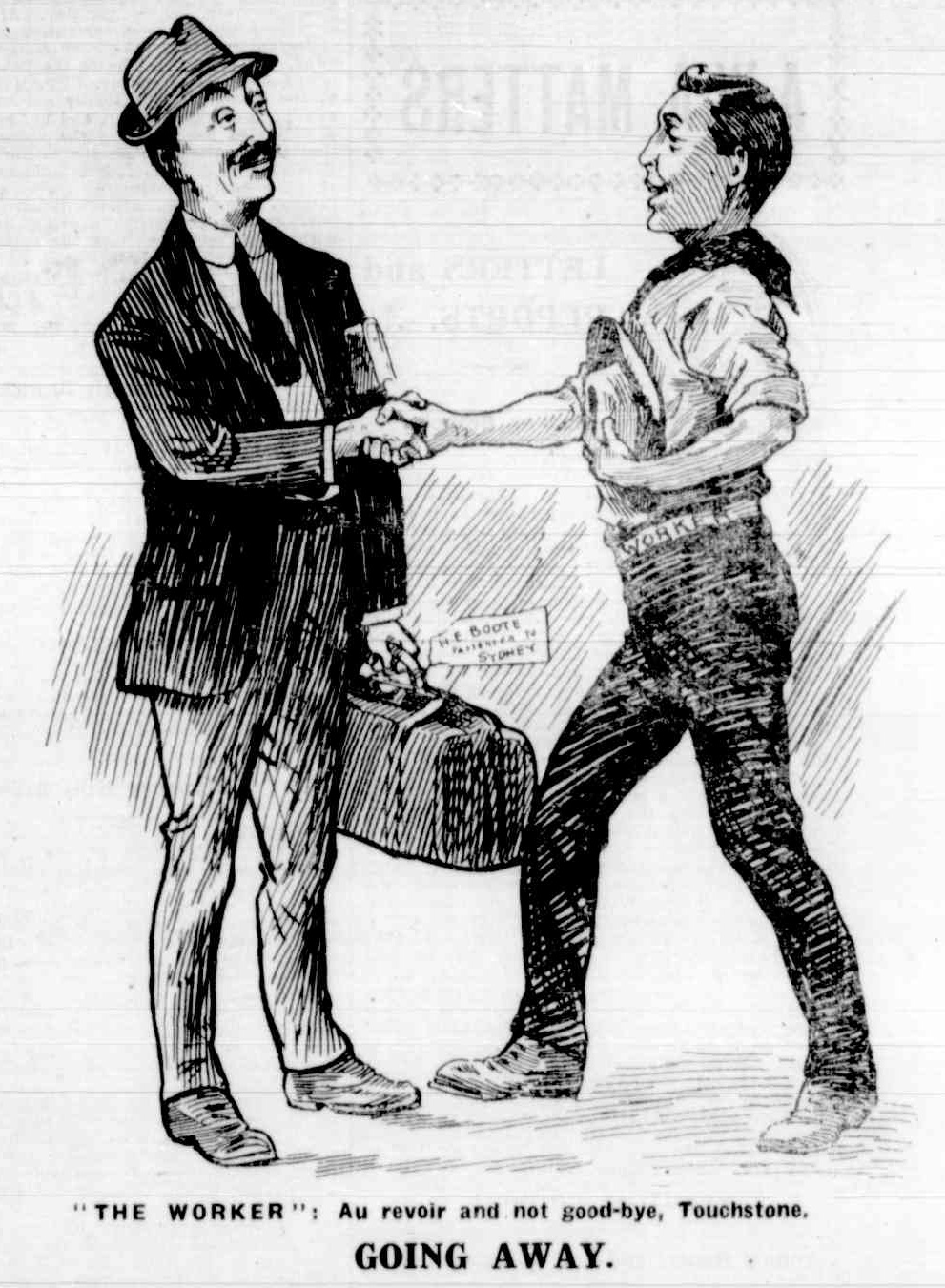
Cartoon regarding the departure in 1911 of Henry E. Boote, the editor of Brisbane's The Worker newspaper.

On 25 January 1902, Boote temporarily replaced Francis Kenna as editor of Brisbane's The Worker newspaper. Kenna had been in the position for two and a half years, but resigned to contest the Bowen electorate at the March 1902 Queensland general election. Boote's appointment as editor of the Brisbane Worker was confirmed in January 1903.

In August 1903, the Brisbane Truth newspaper published a scurrilous accusation about Boote by John Michael Cross, a political rival of Boote's from his years at Gympie. Cross claimed that when Boote arrived in Brisbane in 1889, he went to work at Warwick and Sapsford's during a printers' strike (thereby accusing him of being a 'rat' or 'blackleg'). The accusation was refuted in a detailed article in The Worker, citing evidence that Boote had been en route to Brisbane for the duration of the strike. The accusation that Boote had been a 'blackleg' was revived two years later by William Maxwell, the state Labor member for Burke, during a debate in the Queensland Legislative Assembly on 1 August 1905. On 11 August, the accusation was refuted and Boote's reputation defended by David Bowman, the member for Fortitude Valley.

The cartoonist Jim Case had his first professional start in the pages of The Worker during Boote's editorship.

In early 1911, Boote accepted a position as a feature writer on the staff of The Worker newspaper in Sydney, owned and operated by the Australian Workers' Union (AWU). On the night of 30 March 1911 "a farewell send-off" to Boote by the Australian Labour Federation was held at the fashionable Café Eschenhagen in Queen Street, Brisbane. The event was attended by federal and state Labor members of parliament and representatives of various unions.

=== The Australian Worker ===
In April 1911, Boote joined the staff of The Worker newspaper in Sydney, as a leader and feature writer. In November 1913 the masthead of the newspaper was changed from The Worker to The Australian Worker. Boote was appointed as editor in May 1914 and remained in the position until 1943.

In Sydney, Boote lived with the Australian Worker journalist and writer, Mary Ellen Lloyd. The couple made their home at Rose Bay.

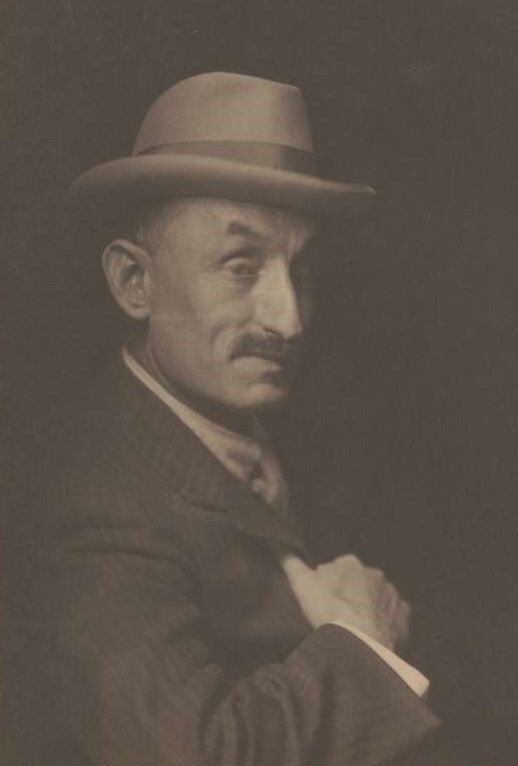
Boote in 1915

At the outbreak of World War I in July 1914, there was widespread political support for Britain and the Empire, with some dissension within the labour movement. With The Bulletin having embraced conservatism and actively supporting the war (and conscription in later years), The Australian Worker remained the most radical publication in general circulation throughout Australia. As the war progressed Boote campaigned against wartime profiteering in the pages of The Worker, supported by Claude Marquet's cartoons on the subject. Increasing casualty reports from the Western Front began to lessen the original enthusiasm for the war in the general community. By mid-1916, with volunteer enlistments falling, the Labor prime minister Billy Hughes decided that conscription was the only viable option for supplying the replacement troops required for the British war effort, despite deep divisions on the matter within the Australian Labor Party. His solution was to hold a public vote on the question, in a nation-wide plebiscite to be held on 28 October 1916.

In August 1914, Boote instituted a regular feature called 'Odd Moments', made up of poetry, literary sketches and reviews from a variety of contributors. The 'Odd Moments' column continued until February 1928.

In November 1916, twelve members of the Industrial Workers of the World (IWW) were charged with three separate conspiracy charges and tried before a jury at the Central Criminal Court in Darlinghurst by the Supreme Court judge Justice Robert Pring. The twelve men became known as the 'Sydney Twelve' or 'IWW Twelve'. On 1 December, the jury returned verdicts of guilty to each of the accused men on some or all of the conspiracy charges. The following day Justice Pring passed sentences on the prisoners. Seven of the men were found guilty of all three charges and sentenced to imprisonment of fifteen years with hard labour.^{[D]} Boote's response to the verdicts, with the headline 'Guilty, or Not Guilty?', was published in The Australian Worker on 7 December 1916. Described as "a characteristically trenchant piece of journalism", the article was a rallying call to the labour movement as exemplified by Boote's closing sentence: "Organised Labor especially should not rest until the prisoners are set free, or their criminality established on testimony less grotesque, less tainted, and less obviously twisted and distorted to the needs of an unscrupulous prosecution.

On 8 December 1916, the twelve men lodged notices of appeal. On 14 December, an article by Boote was published in The Australian Worker, singling out the case of Donald Grant, one of those sentenced to fifteen years. The article expressed astonishment that Grant had "got fifteen years for fifteen words". The jury at his trial was described as being "as stupid as it was vindictive"; of Justice Robert Pring it was remarked that "only a Judge as insolent as he was bitterly biassed could have handed out fifteen years". Boote described the case as "one of the most ghastly atrocities that the Law has ever been guilty of". In late December 1916 Boote and John Bailey, the president of the Australian Workers' Union and registered proprietor of The Australian Worker, were instructed to show cause "why they should not be committed to prison for alleged contempt of court". The application, made by Justice Gordon, submitted that the 14 December article "was objectionable and punishable as being an attack upon the judge and jury, and that such article contained comments which amounted to a contempt of court as tending to interfere with the due course of justice". In a judgment of the New South Wales Full Court in March 1917 no order was made in the case of alleged contempt of court, except that the respondents were required to pay the costs of the proceedings. Boote continued to argue strongly that the prosecution case against the twelve IWW prisoners was deeply flawed. He was the author of pamphlets in June and July 1917 questioning the evidence given by witnesses for the Crown. In August 1918, after revelations in the press about police informants seeking more money, the New South Wales government appointed Justice Street to conduct a Royal Commission into the matter. In early December 1918, after Street concluded that "no fresh facts have been elicited before me raising any doubt in my mind as to the guilt of the convicted men", Boote began a series of seven detailed articles, published weekly in The Australian Worker, critically examining Street's report and analysing the evidence and allegations of bribery. The collected articles were published as Set the 12 Men Free in late February 1919 by the Labour Council of New South Wales. After the Storey Labor government was elected in New South Wales in April 1920 a second Royal Commission made adverse findings against the police informants and recommended the release of most of the twelve men. Ten were released in August 1920 and the remaining two were released shortly afterwards.

Boote was trustee of the Australian Workers' Union (AWU). In 1927 Boote was appointed a trustee of the Public Library of New South Wales. In November 1933 a selection of Boote's poetry was published by 'The Worker' Trustees, with many of the poems illustrated with Boote's own pen sketches. It was said of Boote's prose and poetry that they "bear the impress of his political earnestness".

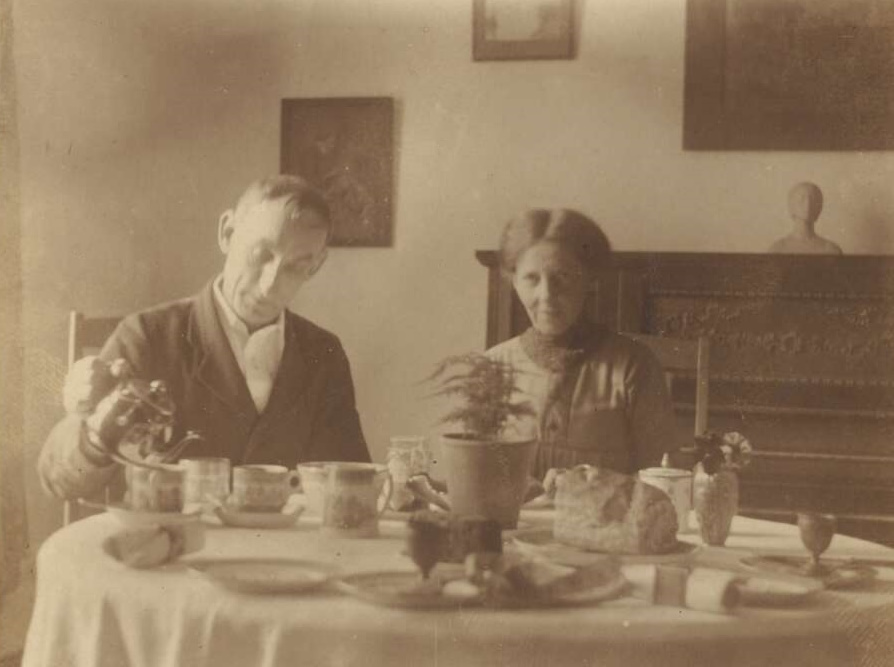
Henry Boote and Mary Ellen Lloyd at their dining-room table.

In April 1934, Boote's forty years of continuous association with the labour movement press in Queensland and New South Wales was celebrated at a "complimentary dinner and social evening" at Adams' Hotel in Sydney by the executive council of the AWU and 'The Worker' Board of Control. Various speakers paid tribute to Boote during the evening, including the former prime minister James Scullin.

Boote was a confidant and friend of Labor leaders such as Ted Theodore, James Scullin, Andrew Fisher, John Curtin and H. V. Evatt. By these close associations and his public writings was able to exercise an influence on party policy and political decision-making.

In 1937, Boote was presented with the Coronation Medal "for his public service to Australia".

In March 1943, Boote retired from the editorship of The Australian Worker on account of ill-health. After retiring Boote was granted a Commonwealth Literary Fund pension.

In his private life, Boote was shy and reticent. He continued to paint throughout his life and was a lover of music. His landscape paintings were not exhibited publicly, but many were given away to friends throughout Australia.

=== Death ===
Boote died on 14 August 1949, aged 84, in Rose Bay, New South Wales, and was buried at the South Head cemetery. After his death, Mary Ellen Lloyd donated his collected papers to the National Library of Australia.

== Publications ==
=== Prose ===
- A Fool's Talk, Sydney: The Worker Trustees, 1915.
- The Case of Grant: Fifteen Years for Fifteen Words, Sydney: Social Democratic League, 1917.
- Guilty or Not Guilty?: An Examination of the I.W.W. Cases, Sydney: Labor Council of N.S.W., 1917.
- Set the 12 Men Free: An Examination of the Sensational Fresh Facts Brought Out Before the I.W.W Royal Commission, Sydney: The Worker Print, February 1919.
- The Land of Wherisit: A Cycle of Tales That Begins at the End and Ends at the Beginning; Told by a Graduate of All Fools' College for the Entertainment of His Kind, Sydney: The Judd Publishing Co., 1919.
- The Human Ladder: An Australian Story of Our Own Time, Sydney: Judd Publishing, 1920.
- Tea with the Devil: And Other Diversions, Sydney: Worker Trustees, 1928.

=== Poetry ===
- As I Went By: Poems, Sydney: Worker Trustees, November 1933.
- The Siren City, Sydney, 1935.
- I Look Forth, Sydney: Worker Trustees, 1937.
- May Day: A Commemoration Poem Written for the Great May Day Demonstration in Sydney, 1938, Sydney: Worker Trustees, 1938. Ten thousand copies of this poem, printed as a four-page leaflet, were distributed during the Sydney May Day Demonstration, 1938.

== Notes ==
A.While Boote was en route to Brisbane there was a month-long general strike in the Brisbane printing trade that began on 4 April 1889 and ended on 7 May.

B.The Brisbane-based newspaper The Worker was the official journal of the Australian Labour Federation. It was established as a monthly newspaper in March 1890, edited by William Lane. From October 1890 The Worker was published fortnightly and from April 1892 it was published weekly. Ernest Blackwell became the editor in 1892. He resigned in August 1893 and was replaced by William G. Higgs, who continued as editor until 1898.

C.The Guardian newspaper had been established in Bundaberg in November 1893 as a bi-weekly journal "to promote the cause of democracy", published by The Bundaberg Co-operative Printing and Publishing Company Ltd. Its first editor was D. J. McGinley.

D.A modern-day view of the 1916 trial and conviction of the men known as the 'Sydney Twelve' or 'IWW Twelve' is that it was "a miscarriage of justice orchestrated with the political aim of tarnishing the reputation of the anti-conscription movement, and of anti-war advocates more generally".
