= 1949 Australian coal strike =

Trade union strike in Australia

The 1949 Australian coal strike was the first time that Australian military forces were used during peacetime to break a trade union strike. The strike by 23,000 coal miners lasted for seven weeks, from 27 June 1949 to 15 August 1949, with troops being sent in by the Ben Chifley Federal Labor government to the open cut coal mines in New South Wales on 28 July 1949, with the workers returning to work, defeated, two weeks later.

== Causes ==
The Australian Coal and Shale Employees' Federation (often known as the Miners' Federation) was heavily influenced at the time by the Communist Party of Australia (CPA), and the strike is widely seen by the Australian community as the CPA applying Cold War Soviet Union Cominform policy in challenging Labor reformism, and promoting a class conflict to promote communist leadership of the working class struggle, at the expense of the Labor Party. The strike was seen as a continuation of the industrial confrontation in the 1948 Queensland Railway strike.

The miners' demands had been lodged over the preceding two years and had included a 35-hour week, a 30-shilling increase in wages, and the inclusion of long service leave as a normal condition of employment.

== Government response ==
Two days after the strike began, the Labor government passed legislation that made it illegal to give strikers and their families financial support (including credit from shops). On 5 July, union officials were ordered to hand over union funds to the industrial registrar. On the following day, union officials were arrested and the respective union and CPA headquarters raided.

At the end of July, seven union officials were sentenced to 12 months' jail and one to six months, with fines being imposed on other officials and three unions. Chifley told the Labor caucus, "The Reds must be taught a lesson", while Arthur Calwell was reported by the union publication The Australian Worker to have said that communists and their sympathisers were only fit for concentration camps. On 1 August 1949, 2500 soldiers commenced coal mining at the open cut mines of Minmi (near Newcastle), Muswellbrook and Ben Bullen, with seven more fields operated later.

At the height of the dispute, Labor senator Donald Grant, a former member of the Industrial Workers of the World imprisoned as part of the Sydney Twelve, told the miners: "I come to Cessnock for one reason. In 1917 ... everyone was behind the workers [in the general strike], but they got beaten. Why? Because the State was against them. I have come here to tell you you won't beat the State."

It is possible that Chifley's decision to use troops to break the strike was influenced by Cold War hysteria or as a reluctant last-minute solution to a major industrial problem. Chifley received regular reports from the Commonwealth Investigation Service (the forerunner of the Australian Security Intelligence Organisation) on the campaigns and policies of the CPA.

Early in the strike, the legality of using troops was investigated, and planning immediately formulated for Operation Excavate potentially as early as the first week in July. On 14 July the Government was said to be on the point of enlisting the support of the anti-communist Australian Workers' Union to break the strike, with an agreement of the Australian Railways Union (likewise anti-communist) to transport the coal. It appears that such negotiations amounted to a bluff and a political ploy to distract attention from the military operations being planned. According to historian Phillip Deery, with 1949 being an election year, Chifley wanted to demonstrate his Government's anti-communist resolve, but the tactics proved insufficient, and the Menzies Government was elected in December 1949.

The use of troops to break the 1949 coal strike was used as a precedent by the Robert Menzies government's intervention on the waterfront at Bowen, Queensland in 1953, and in disputes in 1951, 1952, and 1954 against seamen and waterside workers.

Later, Harold Holt used the navy to break a Seamen's Union of Australia boycott (1967). Malcolm Fraser's government used the Royal Australian Air Force to transport passengers during the 1981 Qantas dispute; Bob Hawke did the same during the 1989 Australian pilots' strike.
