= Donald Grant =

Australian politician (1888–1970)

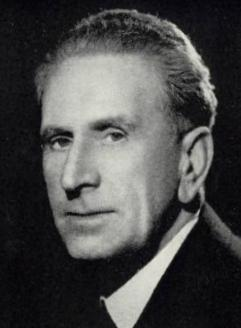

Senator for New South Wales
- In office 1 July 1944 – 30 June 1959

Personal details
- Born: 26 February 1888 Inverness, Scotland
- Died: 11 June 1970 (aged 82) Sydney
- Party: Australian Labor Party
- Occupation: Unionist

Donald MacLennan Grant (26 February 1888 – 11 June 1970) was an Australian politician. He was a leader of the Industrial Workers of the World in Sydney, and a member of the Sydney Twelve, who were charged with conspiracy in 1916, and later a member of the Australian Labor Party who was elected to Sydney City Council, appointed to the New South Wales Legislative Council, and elected to the Australian Senate in 1943 where he served for sixteen years.

== Biography ==
Born in Inverness, Scotland in 1888, Grant emigrated to Australia prior to the First World War. He joined the Industrial Workers of the World (IWW) and became known as one of their best public speakers, regularly drawing large crowds at The Domain, Sydney speaking against conscription, and for militant direct action against the war and capitalism. Tom Barker, the editor of the IWW newspaper Direct Action, was arrested, convicted and sentenced to six months prison for publishing the famous anti-war poster, which said:

To ARMS! Capitalists, Parsons, Politicians, Landlords, Newspaper Editors, and other Stay-at-home Patriots. Your Country needs you in the trenches! Workers, Follow your masters!

Grant is reported to have told the crowd at the Sydney Domain that for every day that Barker is in gaol, it will cost the capitalists 10,000 pounds. These fifteen words formed the large part of the case against him in 1916 when he was arrested and charged as part of the Sydney Twelve with arson, conspiracy to prevent justice and incitement to sedition. He received a sentence of fifteen years, which inspired Henry Boote, editor of The Worker to write The case of Grant, Fifteen years for Fifteen Words. Agitation for a review of the case and the release of all twelve prisoners started immediately and included a Royal Commission which found that Grant had been wrongly convicted. He was subsequently released in August 1920.

Disillusioned with the IWW hostility to parliamentary politics, Grant was the Industrial Socialist Labor Party candidate for the New South Wales Legislative Assembly seat of Sturt in the 1922 state election. He gained less than 8% of the primary vote. Grant joined the Australian Labor Party in 1923. He soon won Labor preselection and was elected to the Sydney City Council for thirteen years. He was appointed by the Annual Conference of the NSW Labor Party to the Socialisation Committee from 1930 to 1933. In 1931 he was appointed to the New South Wales Legislative Council, where he represented the ALP for eight years.

Turning to Federal politics, Grant was elected in 1943 as a Labor party Senator for New South Wales, and was an influential member of the Labor Party parliamentary caucus.

At the height of the 1949 Australian coal strike Grant told the miners:

I come to Cessnock for one reason. In 1917...everyone was behind the workers [in the general strike], but they got beaten. Why? Because the State was against them. I have come here to tell you you won't beat the State.

He had particular interest in international affairs. This resulted in his selection as an Australian representative to the 1946 Paris Peace Conference, a delegate to the International Labor conference in Montreal, and the Commonwealth Parliamentary Association conference in Nairobi, Kenya in 1954. At the age of 71 in 1959 he failed to gain endorsement from the Labor party and retired from politics to his Sydney home where he died on 11 June 1970.
