= Ernie Judd =

Australian socialist, publisher, political writer, and bookseller

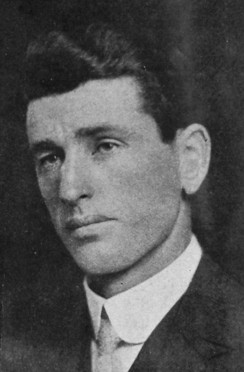
Judd, c. 1920s-40s

Ernest "Ernie" Edward Job Pullin Judd (9 April 1883 – 20 August 1959) was an Australian socialist, publisher, political writer, and bookseller.

== Family ==
Judd was born at Scrubby Plains, near Forbes, New South Wales, the eldest of ten children of Ernest Augustus Judd (1861-1918), a road contractor and his wife Alice Florence, née Stephens (1865-1937). Ernest junior's four grandparents were all from England. Upon reaching adulthood he moved to Sydney.

== Early political activities ==
Ernie frequented W. H. McNamara's bookshop and The Domain in Sydney, and about 1907 he joined and became treasurer of the Socialist Labor Party, followers of Daniel de Leon in the United States of America, who in 1908 split from the Industrial Workers of the World. Judd, however, remained connected to the I.W.W. Club in Sydney.

As an Independent Socialist Judd contested Wollongong in the New South Wales State Elections in 1913, winning 4.8% of the vote. In 1917 he contested King (Sydney) but lost decisively with only 0.4% of the vote.

He was a delegate of the Municipal Workers' Union to the Labor Council of New South Wales during World War I, an opponent of conscription and, with H. E. Boote and P. S. Brookfield, critics of the trial of members of the I.W.W. in 1916. Appointed by the Labor Council as investigator into the case, he worked vigorously for their release. Judd was prominent in the second conscription referendum campaign and secured a scoop when he published W. A. Holman's Secret Memorandum, which advocated dismissal of single men to encourage recruiting.

He was unsuccessful as a Senate candidate in May 1917, although he secured 11,983 votes.

Late in 1918, when resident in Albion Street, Surrey Hills, Sydney, the Commonwealth proceeded against him for making statements prejudicial to recruiting, and he was prosecuted under the War Precautions Act. Though he turned such trials into political drama, the jury found him guilty but urged leniency, which the sentencing judge said he felt had merit, fining Judd just £25. Judd nevertheless appealed the conviction taking the case all the way to the Privy Council in London, where it was dismissed on 21 October 1919.

== Publisher and bookseller ==
Judd had begun his own publishing company and was proprietor of 'The Best Bookshop', 140 Castlereagh Street, in central Sydney, advertising free-thought and birth-control literature in Liberator, the secularist newspaper.

Among Judd's publications were The War and the Sydney Labor Council (1917) and Judd's Speech From the Dock (1919). In his The Case for the O.B.U. (1919), he urged the replacing of 'Class Governments' by an 'Industrial Parliament' and attacked the Australian Labor Party. In March 1919 Labor's John Storey repudiated 'Jock' Garden and Judd as 'limelighters and notoriety hunters'. In 1931 Judd published How to End Capitalism and Inaugurate Socialism and, with A. P. Warren, Why War is Near.

== Post-War Political activities ==
In 1920 Judd was a powerful public speaker, still full haired and of imposing appearance. A police report noted that when he mounted the platform in the Domain, "audiences around the A.L.P. (Australian Labor Party) and other socialist platforms made a beeline for him." The release of ten of the I.W.W. in 1920, after a second Royal Commission, appointed by the Storey government, was perhaps the peak of his reputation. But at State elections that year, standing for Sydney Central, he secured only 282 votes.

Judd refused invitations to a unity conference of Sydney socialists in March 1921, denouncing the Communist Party as 'a front for capitalist spies'. When, on 8 May, ex-soldiers and right-wing demonstrators beset him in the Domain, Judd drew a revolver later arguing that he thought his life was under threat; he was convicted of carrying a firearm and with offensive behaviour. Judd appealed on 12 Sept but it was dismissed with costs against Judd.

As General Secretary of the S.L.P. from 1920, he experienced increasing difficulty in disciplining the industrial organizer A. W. Wilson who described him as 'a filthy minded . . . scurvy rascal . . . with a yellow streak'. Later Judd also fell out with Arnold Peterson, who had succeeded de Leon as head of the American party. Demoralized by declining support, Judd became possessive about party funds. His political court battles resumed. In 1926 he was fined ten shillings (10/-) for failing to vote (which was compulsory) in the 1925 Senate elections. In his defence he argued that it was impossible for him to vote for any of the candidates standing in his constituency. Angry by this decision he appealed it to the New South Wales Supreme Court, which upheld it. He then appealed to the Federal High Court, where four judges heard the case. Unfortunately for Judd only one judge, Mr Justice Higgins, agreed with him and the other three did not.

Using the Revolutionary Socialist newspaper, he attacked R. J. Heffron and supported Tom Mutch in the seat of Botany at the 1927 and 1930 State elections. Heffron sued him over his propaganda in Botany. In November 1930 Judd, described as a "prominent member of the Socialist Labor Party" sued Sun Newspapers Ltd., for libel over their reports concerning him when he stood in North Sydney for election to the Federal Parliament in 1929. He won this and was awarded £100 sterling damages. Emboldened, in May 1932 he sued the Labor Daily newspaper for libel and for £5000 damages concerning their reports of the same election. Although it was a jury trial and they returned a verdict in favour of Judd, derisory damages of one farthing were awarded to him and costs refused.

Still active in The Domain, on 9 January 1938 he was arrested for using "unseemly language" and on 18 February, with Judd defending himself, was nevertheless fined £5 and bound over to be of good behaviour for 12 months.

== Death ==
In 1929 he was still living in Albion Street, Surrey Hills, Sydney, but the following year, when he sued the Barrier Truth newspaper (Broken Hill) his address was given as Liverpool Street, Sydney (although this might have been an office address). From the mid-1930s Judd's vision of human improvement declined; unkempt, he lived in the past. He died on 20 August 1959 in Rydalmere mental hospital. It is unclear why he was there. On his Death Certificate his "usual address" was given as Llandaff Street, Bondi Junction, Sydney. He was cremated without religious rites. He never married.
