= Robert Pring =

Robert Darlow Pring (29 January 1853 – 14 August 1922) was an Australian lawyer, judge of the Supreme Court of New South Wales from 1902 to 1922.

== History ==
Pring, the second son of John Pring and Fanny Florence Jessie Pring, previously of Crowther Estate, near Young, was born at his father's station "Mangoplah" station near Wagga Wagga, and educated at Macquarie Fields, followed by King's School, Parramatta, and the University of Sydney, where he took his MA. He was called to the Bar in 1874, and was appointed a puisne judge of the NSW Supreme Court in 1902, after acting in the position for six months.

Caricature by David Low

Pring died at "Cambewarra ", a private hospital in Leura, after an illness of nearly six months. His remains were interred at the Church of England Cemetery, Rookwood.
