= Direct Action (newspaper) =

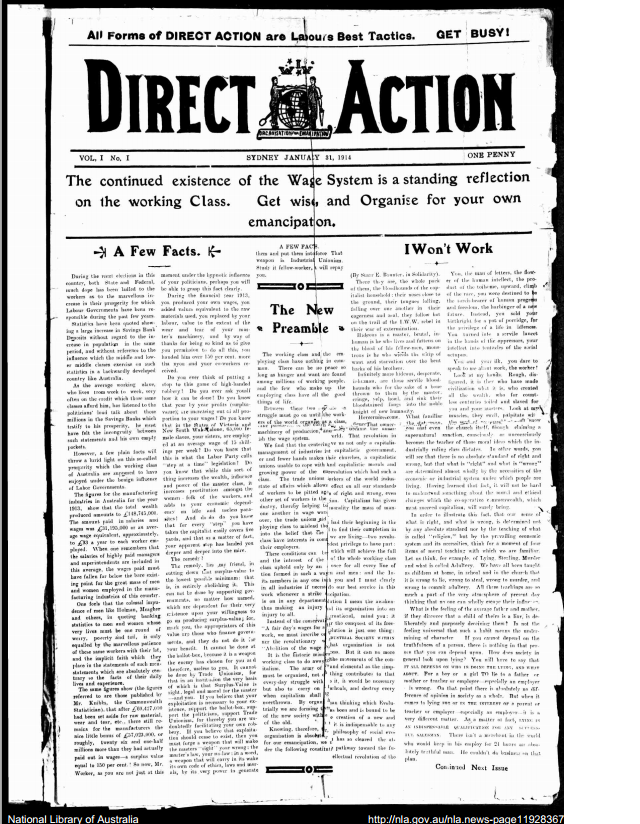
Direct Action, 31 January 1914

Direct Action was an English-language newspaper published in Sydney, New South Wales, Australia. It was published in tabloid format.

== History ==
The paper's first issue was published on 31 January 1914 by the Industrial Workers of the World, Australian Administration. It was a monthly publication concerned with socialism and industrial unionism.

== Digitisation ==
The various versions of the paper have been digitised as part of the Australian Newspapers Digitisation Program, a project hosted by the National Library of Australia.

== See also ==
- List of newspapers in New South Wales
- List of newspapers in Australia

== Bibliography ==
- Two hundred years of Sydney newspapers : a short history, by Victor Isaacs and Rod Kirkpatrick, North Richmond, N.S.W. : Rural Press, 2003.
- Looking good : the changing appearance of Australian newspapers / by Victor Isaacs, for the Australian Newspapers History Group, Middle Park, Qld. : Australian Newspaper History Group, 2007.
- Press timeline : Select chronology of significant Australian press events to 2011 / Compiled by Rod Kirkpatrick for the Australian Newspaper History Group
- Australian Newspaper History : A Bibliography / Compiled by Victor Isaacs, Rod Kirkpatrick and John Russell, Middle Park, Qld. : Australian Newspaper History Group, 2004.
- Newspapers in Australian libraries : a union list. 4th ed.
