= Electoral results for the district of Eastern Suburbs (New South Wales) =

Election results for Eastern Suburbs, New South Wales, Australia

Eastern Suburbs, an electoral district of the Legislative Assembly in the Australian state of New South Wales was created in 1920 and abolished in 1927.

Election	Member	Party	Member	Party	Member	Party	Member	Party	Member	Party
1920	James Macarthur-Onslow	Progressive	Charles Oakes	Nationalist	Harold Jaques	Nationalist	James Fingleton	Labor	Bob O'Halloran	Labor
1920 appt	James Macarthur-Onslow	Progressive	Charles Oakes	Nationalist	Harold Jaques	Nationalist	Daniel Dwyer	Labor	Bob O'Halloran	Labor
1922	Hyman Goldstein	Nationalist	Charles Oakes	Nationalist	Harold Jaques	Nationalist	Cyril Fallon	Democratic	Bob O'Halloran	Labor
1925	William Foster	Nationalist	Millicent Preston-Stanley	Nationalist	Harold Jaques	Nationalist	Septimus Alldis	Labor	Bob O'Halloran	Labor

== Election results ==
=== Elections in the 1920s ===
==== 1925 ====
1925 New South Wales state election: Eastern Suburbs
Party	Candidate	Votes	%	±%
Quota		9,010		
Nationalist	Millicent Preston-Stanley (elected 5)	7,958	14.7	+6.9
Nationalist	William Foster (elected 4)	7,331	13.6	+8.5
Nationalist	Harold Jaques (elected 3)	7,324	13.6	+2.2
Nationalist	Hyman Goldstein	6,913	12.8	+2.8
Nationalist	Joseph Robinson	547	1.0	+1.0
Nationalist	George Overhill	543	1.0	+1.0
Labor	Bob O'Halloran (elected 1)	8,499	15.7	+4.1
Labor	Septimus Alldis (elected 2)	4,121	7.6	+7.6
Labor	William Crick	1,132	2.1	+2.1
Labor	Gertrude Melville	1,057	2.0	+2.0
Labor	Gordon Anderson	938	1.7	+1.7
Independent	Cyril Fallon (defeated)	5,996	11.1	+0.2
Protestant Labour	James Gillespie	1,489	2.8	+2.8
Independent	David Anderson	128	0.2	+0.2
Independent	Frederick Marks	82	0.2	+0.2
Total formal votes		54,058	96.7	−0.3
Informal votes		1,845	3.3	+0.3
Turnout		55,903	65.4	−3.7
Party total votes
Nationalist		30,616	56.6	+2.2
Labor		15,747	29.1	+10.4
Independent	Cyril Fallon	5,996	11.1	+0.2
Protestant Labour		1,489	2.8	+2.8
Independent	David Anderson	128	0.2	+0.2
Independent	Frederick Marks	82	0.2	+0.2

==== 1922 ====
1922 New South Wales state election: Eastern Suburbs
Party	Candidate	Votes	%	±%
Quota		8,537		
Nationalist	Charles Oakes (elected 1)	10,297	20.1	+5.2
Nationalist	Harold Jaques (elected 3)	5,840	11.4	−3.6
Nationalist	Hyman Goldstein (elected 4)	5,106	10.0	+10.0
Nationalist	Millicent Preston-Stanley	4,012	7.8	+7.8
Nationalist	William Foster	2,627	5.1	+5.1
Labor	Bob O'Halloran (elected 2)	5,944	11.6	+0.6
Labor	Daniel Dwyer (defeated)	1,620	3.2	−1.1
Labor	Alfred Warton	859	1.7	+1.7
Labor	Robert Campbell	697	1.4	+1.4
Labor	Frank Green	480	0.9	+0.9
Democratic	Cyril Fallon (elected 5)	5,581	10.9	+10.9
Progressive	Joseph Barracluff	2,200	4.3	+4.3
Progressive	Frederick Davison	265	0.5	+0.5
Progressive	Donald McDonald	188	0.4	+0.4
Progressive	Edwin Sautelle	181	0.4	+0.4
Progressive	John Keenan	160	0.3	+0.3
Progressive	Alfred Barber	65	0.1	+0.1
Progressive	Alfred Finney	58	0.1	+0.1
Independent	Richard Meagher	2,490	4.9	+4.9
Independent Labor	Scott Campbell (Note: Scott Campbell had been nominated by the Labor Party for the 1920 election however his endorsement was withdrawn before the polling day because he signed a pledge for the unconditional release of twelve imprisoned members of the Industrial Workers of the World.)	2,242	4.4	+4.4
Soldier's Nationalist	Frederick Marks	244	0.5	+0.5
Independent Labor	John Hackett	47	0.1	+0.1
Independent	Jack Lamier	13	0.03	+0.03
Total formal votes		51,216	97.0	+8.5
Informal votes		1,577	3.0	−8.5
Turnout		52,793	69.1	+18.0
Party total votes
Nationalist		27,882	54.4	+11.1
Labor		9,600	18.7	−12.0
Democratic		5,581	10.9	+10.9
Progressive		3,117	6.1	−5.6
Independent	Richard Meagher	2,490	4.9	+4.9
Independent Labor	Johnston Campbell	2,242	4.4	+4.4
Ind. Nationalist	Frederick Marks	244	0.5	+0.5
Independent Labor	John Hackett	47	0.1	+0.1
Independent	Jack Lamier	13	0.03	+0.03

==== 1920 appointment ====
James Fingleton died on 13 October 1920. Between 1920 and 1927 the Legislative Assembly was elected using a form of proportional representation with multi-member seats and a single transferable vote (modified Hare-Clark). There was confusion at the time as to the process to be used to fill the vacancy. When George Beeby resigned on 9 August 1920, in accordance with the practice prior to 1920, the Speaker of the Legislative Assembly issued a writ of election requiring a by-election to be conducted, however the Chief Electoral Officer said he couldn't do so under then law at the time and that a by-election would be contrary to the principle of proportional representation. The vacancies were left unfilled until the Parliament passed the Parliamentary Elections (Casual Vacancies) Act on 10 December 1920, so that casual vacancies were filled by the next unsuccessful candidate on the incumbent member's party list. Scott Campbell had been the first unsuccessful candidate at the 1920 election nominated by the Labor Party, however his endorsement, as well as that of Patrick Minahan was withdrawn before the polling day because he signed a pledge for the unconditional release of twelve imprisoned members of the Industrial Workers of the World. The Labor party decided that the first unsuccessful party candidate was Daniel Dwyer, and he took his seat on 15 December 1920.

==== 1920 ====
1920 New South Wales state election: Eastern Suburbs
Party	Candidate	Votes	%	±%
Quota		4,938		
Nationalist	Harold Jaques (elected 2)	4,432	15.0	
Nationalist	Charles Oakes (elected 1)	4,422	14.9	
Nationalist	Charles Williams	2,718	9.2	
Nationalist	Henry Rogers	1,190	4.0	
Nationalist	James Mullaney	51	0.2	
Labor	Bob O'Halloran (elected 4)	3,248	11.0	
Labor	James Fingleton (elected 3)	2,152	7.3	
Labor	Scott Campbell (Note: Patrick Minahan and Scott Campbell were nominated by the Labor Party, however their endorsement was withdrawn before the polling day because they signed a pledge for the unconditional release of twelve imprisoned members of the Industrial Workers of the World.)	2,112	7.1	
Labor	Daniel Dwyer	1,263	4.3	
Labor	Walter Humphries	334	1.1	
Progressive	James Macarthur-Onslow (elected 5)	2,870	9.7	
Progressive	Arthur Doran	593	2.0	
Independent	William Ross	2,907	9.8	
Soldiers & Citizens	Grace Scobie	875	3.0	
Soldiers & Citizens	Frederick Winn-Walker	136	0.5	
Soldiers & Citizens	Alexander Hogan	111	0.4	
Soldiers & Citizens	Edgar Spencer	56	0.2	
Independent	Sidney Buckleton	152	0.5	
Total formal votes		29,622	88.5	
Informal votes		3,859	11.5	
Turnout		33,481	51.1	
Party total votes
Nationalist		12,813	43.3	
Labor		9,109	30.8	
Progressive		3,463	11.7	
Independent	William Ross	2,907	9.8	
Soldiers & Citizens		1,178	4.0	
Independent	Sidney Buckleton	152	0.5	
