= Results of the 1925 New South Wales state election =

State election for New South Wales, Australia in May 1925

New South Wales state election, 30 May 1925 Legislative Assembly << 1922–1927 >>
| Enrolled voters | 1,339,080 | | | | |
| Votes cast | 924,979 | | Turnout | 69.08 | −0.93 |
| Informal votes | 30,155 | | Informal | 3.26 | −0.37 |
Summary of votes by party
| Party | Primary votes | % | Swing | Seats | Change |
| Labor | 413,275 | 46.19 | +7.70 | 46 | +9 (Note: Wammerawa has been included as a second Labor seat from the 1922 election. The returning officer declared that William Ashford (Independent) had been elected 3rd, however the Elections and Qualifications Committee upheld a petition by Joseph Clark (Labor) and after re-counting the votes declared that Clark had been elected.) |
| Nationalist | 339,306 | 37.92 | −5.25 | 32 | −9 |
| Progressive | 81,450 | 9.10 | −1.98 | 9 | ±0 |
| Independent | 23,454 | 2.62 | −1.16 | 1 | ±0 |
| Protestant Labour | 22,843 | 2.55 | +2.55 | 1 | +1 |
| Ind. Nationalist | 6,965 | 0.78 | +0.78 | 1 | +1 |
| Independent Labor | 3,214 | 0.36 | −0.52 | 0 | ±0 |
| Protestant Independent National | 1,883 | 0.21 | +0.21 | 0 | |
| Young Australia Party | 1,407 | 0.16 | +0.16 | 0 | |
| Communist | 831 | 0.09 | +0.09 | 0 | |
| Majority Labor | 196 | 0.02 | +0.02 | 0 | |
| Total | 894,824 | | | 90 | |

The 1925 New South Wales state election was for 90 seats representing 24 electoral districts, with each district returning between 3 and 5 members. This was the third and final election in New South Wales that took place under a modified Hare-Clark voting system. The average number of enrolled voters per member was 14,690, ranging from Sturt (10,297) to Ryde (19,119).

== Results by electoral district ==
=== Balmain ===
1925 New South Wales state election: Balmain
| Party | Candidate | Votes | % | ±% |
|---|---|---|---|---|
| Quota | | 7,727 | | |
| Labor | H. V. Evatt (elected 1) | 14,733 | 31.8 | +31.8 |
| Labor | Robert Stuart-Robertson (elected 5) | 4,567 | 9.9 | −3.5 |
| Labor | John Quirk (elected 4) | 4,562 | 9.8 | −3.5 |
| Labor | Tom Keegan (elected 2) | 4,305 | 9.3 | −3.5 |
| Labor | Kate Dwyer | 3,622 | 7.8 | +7.8 |
| Nationalist | Albert Lane (elected 3) | 6,306 | 13.6 | +1.7 |
| Nationalist | Robert Stopford (defeated) | 5,880 | 12.7 | −1.4 |
| Nationalist | Stanley Cole | 1,171 | 2.5 | +2.5 |
| Nationalist | Thomas Greentree | 304 | 0.7 | −3.6 |
| Nationalist | Gideon Gillespie | 189 | 0.4 | +0.4 |
| Protestant Labour | James Johnston | 439 | 1.0 | +1.0 |
| Communist | Thomas Payne | 199 | 0.4 | +0.4 |
| Communist | Lionel Leece | 40 | 0.1 | +0.1 |
| Independent | Charles Mallett | 42 | 0.1 | +0.1 |
| Total formal votes | | 46,359 | 97.0 | +1.1 |
| Informal votes | | 1,424 | 3.0 | −1.1 |
| Turnout | | 47,783 | 69.9 | +0.9 |
Party total votes
| Labor | | 31,789 | 68.6 | +15.2 |
| Nationalist | | 13,850 | 29.9 | −11.3 |
| Protestant Labour | | 439 | 1.0 | +1.0 |
| Communist | | 239 | 0.5 | +0.5 |
| Independent | Charles Mallett | 42 | 0.1 | +0.1 |

=== Bathurst ===
1925 New South Wales state election: Bathurst
| Party | Candidate | Votes | % | ±% |
|---|---|---|---|---|
| Quota | | 7,461 | | |
| Labor | James Dooley (elected 1) | 9,378 | 31.4 | +5.2 |
| Labor | Gus Kelly (elected 2) | 3,940 | 13.2 | +12.0 |
| Labor | Hamilton Knight | 2,333 | 7.8 | +7.8 |
| Nationalist | John Fitzpatrick (elected 3) | 7,155 | 24.0 | −4.7 |
| Nationalist | Charles Rosenthal (defeated) | 3,540 | 11.9 | −1.0 |
| Nationalist | James Beddie | 3,495 | 11.7 | +11.7 |
| Total formal votes | | 29,841 | 97.4 | +1.1 |
| Informal votes | | 789 | 2.6 | −1.1 |
| Turnout | | 30,630 | 71.5 | +0.4 |
Party total votes
| Labor | | 15,651 | 52.4 | +5.5 |
| Nationalist | | 14,190 | 47.6 | +3.1 |

=== Botany ===
1925 New South Wales state election: Botany
| Party | Candidate | Votes | % | ±% |
|---|---|---|---|---|
| Quota | | 7,919 | | |
| Labor | Thomas Mutch (elected 1) | 10,146 | 21.4 | +6.4 |
| Labor | William McKell (elected 3) | 8,523 | 17.9 | +4.1 |
| Labor | Bill Ratcliffe (elected 4) | 5,726 | 12.1 | −0.9 |
| Labor | William Long | 4,284 | 9.0 | +9.0 |
| Labor | Frank Burke (elected 5) | 4,017 | 8.5 | −2.0 |
| Nationalist | John Lee (elected 2) | 10,098 | 21.2 | +0.3 |
| Nationalist | David Alexander | 665 | 1.4 | −1.6 |
| Nationalist | William Herford | 108 | 0.2 | +0.2 |
| Nationalist | James Sinclair | 99 | 0.2 | +0.2 |
| Nationalist | Stephen Turner | 46 | 0.1 | +0.1 |
| Independent Labor | Peter Gallagher | 3,034 | 6.4 | +6.4 |
| Protestant Labour | Walter Bateman | 370 | 0.8 | +0.8 |
| Communist | Henry Denford | 147 | 0.3 | +0.3 |
| Communist | Nellie Rickie | 111 | 0.2 | +0.2 |
| Independent | Arthur Strange-Mure | 76 | 0.2 | +0.2 |
| Majority Labor | Carl Liebau | 63 | 0.1 | +0.1 |
| Total formal votes | | 47,513 | 95.6 | +0.6 |
| Informal votes | | 2,210 | 4.4 | −0.6 |
| Turnout | | 49,723 | 69.2 | +0.6 |
Party total votes
| Labor | | 32,696 | 68.8 | +7.0 |
| Nationalist | | 11,016 | 23.2 | −6.5 |
| Independent Labor | | 3,034 | 6.4 | +6.4 |
| Protestant Labour | | 370 | 0.8 | +0.8 |
| Communist | | 258 | 0.5 | +0.5 |
| Independent | Arthur Strange-Mure | 76 | 0.2 | +0.2 |
| Majority Labor | | 63 | 0.1 | +0.1 |

=== Byron ===
1925 New South Wales state election: Byron
| Party | Candidate | Votes | % | ±% |
|---|---|---|---|---|
| Quota | | 7,684 | | |
| Progressive | William Missingham (elected 1) | 10,097 | 32.9 | +22.6 |
| Progressive | Frederick Stuart (elected 3) | 3,307 | 10.8 | +10.8 |
| Progressive | John Williams | 2,683 | 8.7 | +8.7 |
| Progressive | Thomas Foyster | 381 | 1.2 | +1.2 |
| Labor | Robert Gillies (elected 2) | 5,775 | 18.8 | +18.8 |
| Labor | Tom Swiney | 4,061 | 13.2 | −9.3 |
| Labor | Ernest Hollis-Neath | 232 | 0.8 | +0.8 |
| Nationalist | Stephen Perdriau (defeated) | 3,501 | 11.4 | −11.2 |
| Nationalist | Charles Munro | 469 | 1.5 | +1.5 |
| Nationalist | Stanley Fayle | 226 | 0.7 | +0.7 |
| Total formal votes | | 30,732 | 97.5 | +0.3 |
| Informal votes | | 790 | 2.5 | −0.3 |
| Turnout | | 31,522 | 69.8 | −1.0 |
Party total votes
| Progressive | | 16,468 | 53.6 | +32.2 |
| Labor | | 10,068 | 32.8 | +9.0 |
| Nationalist | | 4,196 | 13.6 | −41.2 |

=== Cootamundra ===
1925 New South Wales state election: Cootamundra
| Party | Candidate | Votes | % | ±% |
|---|---|---|---|---|
| Quota | | 7,114 | | |
| Labor | Peter Loughlin (elected 1) | 8,033 | 28.2 | +5.6 |
| Labor | Ken Hoad (elected 3) | 4,157 | 14.6 | +7.0 |
| Labor | Joseph Carney | 2,935 | 10.3 | +10.3 |
| Progressive | Hugh Main (elected 2) | 5,005 | 17.6 | −3.9 |
| Progressive | Ernest Field | 1,435 | 5.0 | +5.0 |
| Progressive | Benjamin Witenden | 424 | 1.5 | +1.5 |
| Progressive | Eric Treatt | 213 | 0.7 | +0.7 |
| Nationalist | Angus Campbell | 3,789 | 13.3 | +1.0 |
| Nationalist | Ernest Todhunter | 895 | 3.1 | +3.1 |
| Nationalist | William Pinkstone | 603 | 2.1 | +2.1 |
| Protestant Labour | George Davey | 966 | 3.4 | +3.4 |
| Total formal votes | | 28,455 | 96.9 | +0.5 |
| Informal votes | | 918 | 3.1 | −0.5 |
| Turnout | | 29,373 | 71.2 | +0.6 |
Party total votes
| Labor | | 15,125 | 53.2 | +2.9 |
| Progressive | | 7,077 | 24.9 | −9.3 |
| Nationalist | | 5,287 | 18.6 | +3.7 |
| Protestant Labour | | 966 | 3.4 | +3.4 |

=== Cumberland ===
1925 New South Wales state election: Cumberland
| Party | Candidate | Votes | % | ±% |
|---|---|---|---|---|
| Quota | | 7,885 | | |
| Nationalist | William FitzSimons (elected 1) | 8,959 | 28.4 | +2.6 |
| Nationalist | Bruce Walker Sr (elected 2) | 7,989 | 25.3 | +2.3 |
| Nationalist | James Shand | 4,010 | 12.7 | +12.7 |
| Labor | James McGirr (elected 3) | 7,102 | 22.5 | −3.1 |
| Labor | Robert Bingham | 1,621 | 5.1 | +5.1 |
| Progressive | Reginald Harris | 826 | 2.6 | +2.6 |
| Progressive | Aaron Morris | 121 | 0.4 | +0.4 |
| Progressive | Arthur Upchurch | 47 | 0.2 | +0.2 |
| Independent | Ernest Carr | 330 | 1.1 | +1.1 |
| Independent | John Allaburton | 124 | 0.4 | +0.4 |
| Total formal votes | | 31,537 | 97.3 | +0.3 |
| Informal votes | | 882 | 2.7 | −0.3 |
| Turnout | | 32,419 | 68.9 | −1.1 |
Party total votes
| Nationalist | | 20,958 | 66.4 | −4.9 |
| Labor | | 9,131 | 29.0 | +2.9 |
| Progressive | | 994 | 3.2 | +0.6 |
| Independent | Ernest Carr | 330 | 1.1 | +1.1 |
| Independent | John Allaburton | 124 | 0.4 | +0.4 |

=== Eastern Suburbs ===
1925 New South Wales state election: Eastern Suburbs
| Party | Candidate | Votes | % | ±% |
|---|---|---|---|---|
| Quota | | 9,010 | | |
| Nationalist | Millicent Preston-Stanley (elected 5) | 7,958 | 14.7 | +6.9 |
| Nationalist | William Foster (elected 4) | 7,331 | 13.6 | +8.5 |
| Nationalist | Harold Jaques (elected 3) | 7,324 | 13.6 | +2.2 |
| Nationalist | Hyman Goldstein | 6,913 | 12.8 | +2.8 |
| Nationalist | Joseph Robinson | 547 | 1.0 | +1.0 |
| Nationalist | George Overhill | 543 | 1.0 | +1.0 |
| Labor | Bob O'Halloran (elected 1) | 8,499 | 15.7 | +4.1 |
| Labor | Septimus Alldis (elected 2) | 4,121 | 7.6 | +7.6 |
| Labor | William Crick | 1,132 | 2.1 | +2.1 |
| Labor | Gertrude Melville | 1,057 | 2.0 | +2.0 |
| Labor | Gordon Anderson | 938 | 1.7 | +1.7 |
| Independent | Cyril Fallon (defeated) | 5,996 | 11.1 | +0.2 |
| Protestant Labour | James Gillespie | 1,489 | 2.8 | +2.8 |
| Independent | David Anderson | 128 | 0.2 | +0.2 |
| Independent | Frederick Marks | 82 | 0.2 | +0.2 |
| Total formal votes | | 54,058 | 96.7 | −0.3 |
| Informal votes | | 1,845 | 3.3 | +0.3 |
| Turnout | | 55,903 | 65.4 | −3.7 |
Party total votes
| Nationalist | | 30,616 | 56.6 | +2.2 |
| Labor | | 15,747 | 29.1 | +10.4 |
| Independent | Cyril Fallon | 5,996 | 11.1 | +0.2 |
| Protestant Labour | | 1,489 | 2.8 | +2.8 |
| Independent | David Anderson | 128 | 0.2 | +0.2 |
| Independent | Frederick Marks | 82 | 0.2 | +0.2 |

=== Goulburn ===
1925 New South Wales state election: Goulburn
| Party | Candidate | Votes | % | ±% |
|---|---|---|---|---|
| Quota | | 6,490 | | |
| Labor | Paddy Stokes (elected 2) | 7,078 | 27.3 | +27.3 |
| Labor | Jack Tully (elected 3) | 4,295 | 16.6 | +16.6 |
| Labor | Clarence Steele | 685 | 2.6 | +2.6 |
| Nationalist | John Perkins (elected 1) | 7,665 | 29.5 | +11.6 |
| Nationalist | Henry Bate | 1,815 | 7.0 | −5.0 |
| Nationalist | Percy Hollis | 616 | 2.4 | +2.4 |
| Progressive | William Hedges | 1,496 | 5.8 | +5.8 |
| Progressive | William Bluett | 1,238 | 4.8 | +4.8 |
| Progressive | Adam Singer | 1,034 | 4.0 | +4.0 |
| Young Australia | Denis O'Leary | 34 | 0.1 | +0.1 |
| Total formal votes | | 25,956 | 97.0 | +1.0 |
| Informal votes | | 794 | 3.0 | −1.0 |
| Turnout | | 26,750 | 69.1 | −0.5 |
Party total votes
| Labor | | 12,058 | 46.5 | +9.2 |
| Nationalist | | 10,096 | 38.9 | +9.0 |
| Progressive | | 3,768 | 14.5 | −18.0 |
| Young Australia | | 34 | 0.1 | +0.1 |

=== Maitland ===
1925 New South Wales state election: Maitland
| Party | Candidate | Votes | % | ±% |
|---|---|---|---|---|
| Quota | | 7,304 | | |
| Nationalist | Walter Bennett (elected 2) | 6,989 | 23.9 | +4.2 |
| Nationalist | William Cameron (elected 3) | 5,856 | 20.0 | +2.6 |
| Nationalist | Charles Nicholson | 2,729 | 9.3 | +9.3 |
| Labor | Walter O'Hearn (elected 1) | 11,075 | 37.9 | +7.1 |
| Labor | John Hynes | 782 | 2.7 | +2.7 |
| Labor | William McClelland | 292 | 1.0 | +1.0 |
| Protestant Labour | George Batey | 1,490 | 5.1 | +5.1 |
| Total formal votes | | 29,213 | 96.7 | +0.7 |
| Informal votes | | 990 | 3.3 | −0.7 |
| Turnout | | 30,203 | 68.3 | −1.2 |
Party total votes
| Nationalist | | 15,574 | 53.3 | 0.0 |
| Labor | | 12,149 | 41.6 | +7.4 |
| Protestant Labour | | 1,490 | 5.1 | +5.1 |

=== Murray ===
1925 New South Wales state election: Murray
| Party | Candidate | Votes | % | ±% |
|---|---|---|---|---|
| Quota | | 6,138 | | |
| Labor | Vern Goodin (elected 3) | 4,708 | 19.2 | +19.2 |
| Labor | William O'Brien | 3,711 | 15.1 | −10.2 |
| Labor | George Bodkin | 2,972 | 12.1 | +12.1 |
| Nationalist | Richard Ball (elected 1) | 8,274 | 33.7 | +1.5 |
| Nationalist | Joseph Niesigh | 167 | 0.7 | +0.7 |
| Progressive | Matthew Kilpatrick (elected 2) | 4,037 | 16.4 | +4.0 |
| Progressive | Charles Coghlan | 498 | 2.0 | +2.0 |
| Progressive | Olave Olsen | 184 | 0.8 | +0.8 |
| Total formal votes | | 24,551 | 95.3 | −0.5 |
| Informal votes | | 1,200 | 4.7 | +0.5 |
| Turnout | | 25,751 | 60.4 | −4.8 |
Party total votes
| Labor | | 11,391 | 46.4 | +5.2 |
| Nationalist | | 8,441 | 34.4 | −6.9 |
| Progressive | | 4,719 | 19.2 | +1.7 |

=== Murrumbidgee ===
1925 New South Wales state election: Murrumbidgee
| Party | Candidate | Votes | % | ±% |
|---|---|---|---|---|
| Quota | | 7,060 | | |
| Labor | Martin Flannery (elected 1) | 9,915 | 35.1 | −2.5 |
| Labor | James Lyons | 1,728 | 6.1 | +5.2 |
| Labor | William Nulty | 1,627 | 5.8 | +5.8 |
| Progressive | Ernest Buttenshaw (elected 2) | 9,307 | 33.0 | −1.4 |
| Progressive | Alexander McArthur | 1,127 | 4.0 | +4.0 |
| Nationalist | Edmund Best (elected 3) | 2,195 | 7.8 | +7.8 |
| Nationalist | Duncan Cameron | 1,217 | 4.3 | +4.3 |
| Nationalist | Reginald Westmore | 1,044 | 3.7 | +3.7 |
| Independent | Mary McCracken | 78 | 0.3 | +0.3 |
| Total formal votes | | 28,238 | 96.1 | +1.1 |
| Informal votes | | 1,139 | 3.9 | −1.1 |
| Turnout | | 29,377 | 62.2 | −1.7 |
Party total votes
| Labor | | 13,270 | 47.0 | +6.1 |
| Progressive | | 10,434 | 36.9 | −3.8 |
| Nationalist | | 4,456 | 15.8 | −2.1 |
| Independent | Mary McCracken | 78 | 0.3 | +0.3 |

=== Namoi ===
1925 New South Wales state election: Namoi
| Party | Candidate | Votes | % | ±% |
|---|---|---|---|---|
| Quota | | 6,621 | | |
| Labor | William Scully (elected 1) | 9,487 | 35.8 | +5.4 |
| Labor | Michael Hagan | 897 | 3.4 | +3.4 |
| Labor | James Hawkins | 803 | 3.0 | +3.0 |
| Nationalist | Walter Wearne (elected 2) | 5,639 | 21.3 | +0.6 |
| Nationalist | Frank Chaffey (elected 3) | 4,696 | 17.7 | −4.8 |
| Progressive | Aubrey Abbott | 3,395 | 12.8 | +12.8 |
| Progressive | Lachlan McLachlan | 392 | 1.5 | +1.5 |
| Progressive | James Laird | 227 | 0.9 | +0.9 |
| Independent | Robert Levien | 947 | 3.6 | −5.8 |
| Total formal votes | | 26,483 | 96.3 | +0.3 |
| Informal votes | | 1,023 | 3.7 | −0.3 |
| Turnout | | 27,506 | 70.3 | +0.1 |
Party total votes
| Labor | | 11,187 | 42.2 | +4.4 |
| Nationalist | | 10,335 | 39.0 | −4.1 |
| Progressive | | 4,014 | 15.2 | +5.5 |
| Independent | Robert Levien | 947 | 3.6 | −5.8 |

=== Newcastle ===
1925 New South Wales state election: Newcastle
| Party | Candidate | Votes | % | ±% |
|---|---|---|---|---|
| Quota | | 9,602 | | |
| Labor | Jack Baddeley (elected 1) | 16,394 | 28.5 | +5.8 |
| Labor | David Murray (elected 3) | 9,941 | 17.3 | +4.6 |
| Labor | Hugh Connell (elected 4) | 5,698 | 9.9 | +2.9 |
| Labor | George Booth (elected 5) | 2,336 | 4.1 | +4.1 |
| Labor | David Davies | 2,157 | 3.7 | +3.7 |
| Protestant Labour | Walter Skelton (elected 2) | 10,194 | 17.7 | −7.5 |
| Protestant Labour | James Pendlebury | 405 | 0.7 | +0.7 |
| Protestant Labour | James Hestelow | 344 | 0.6 | +0.6 |
| Nationalist | Magnus Cromarty (defeated) | 6,270 | 10.9 | +5.5 |
| Nationalist | John Fegan | 578 | 1.0 | −2.1 |
| Nationalist | David Murray | 431 | 0.7 | +0.7 |
| Nationalist | Charles Watt | 343 | 0.6 | +0.6 |
| Nationalist | Oliver Denny | 110 | 0.2 | +0.2 |
| Independent | Arthur Gardiner | 2,238 | 3.9 | +3.9 |
| Independent | Robert Mitchell | 167 | 0.3 | +0.3 |
| Total formal votes | | 57,606 | 96.3 | −0.4 |
| Informal votes | | 2,180 | 3.7 | +0.4 |
| Turnout | | 59,786 | 75.5 | +0.3 |
Party total votes
| Labor | | 36,526 | 63.4 | +13.5 |
| Protestant Labour | | 10,943 | 19.0 | +19.0 |
| Nationalist | | 7,732 | 13.4 | −0.5 |
| Independent | Arthur Gardiner | 2,238 | 3.9 | +3.9 |
| Independent | Robert Mitchell | 167 | 0.3 | +0.3 |

=== North Shore ===
1925 New South Wales state election: North Shore
| Party | Candidate | Votes | % | ±% |
|---|---|---|---|---|
| Quota | | 8,768 | | |
| Nationalist | Richard Arthur (elected 1) | 10,898 | 20.7 | +9.9 |
| Nationalist | Alfred Reid (elected 4) | 5,853 | 11.1 | +2.3 |
| Nationalist | Ernest Marks | 3,005 | 5.7 | +5.7 |
| Nationalist | Ernest Salmon | 2,713 | 5.2 | +5.2 |
| Nationalist | William Wood | 1,442 | 2.7 | +2.7 |
| Labor | Cecil Murphy (elected 2) | 8,362 | 15.9 | −0.5 |
| Labor | Arthur Tonge | 3,338 | 6.4 | +6.3 |
| Labor | Bertrand Childs | 1,226 | 2.3 | +2.3 |
| Labor | Oliver Kelly | 107 | 0.2 | +0.2 |
| Labor | Samuel Sloane | 78 | 0.2 | +0.2 |
| Ind. Nationalist | William Fell (elected 3) | 6,965 | 13.2 | +1.9 |
| Independent | Alick Kay (elected 5) | 5,126 | 9.7 | +9.7 |
| Independent | Mary Williams | 2,278 | 4.3 | +4.3 |
| Independent | Alfred Waterhouse | 657 | 1.3 | +1.3 |
| Protestant Labour | Raymond Campbell-Cowan | 542 | 1.0 | +1.0 |
| Independent | Harry Meatheringham | 14 | 0.03 | −0.08 |
| Total formal votes | | 52,604 | 97.5 | −0.2 |
| Informal votes | | 1,335 | 2.5 | +0.2 |
| Turnout | | 53,939 | 69.7 | −3.1 |
Party total votes
| Nationalist | | 23,911 | 45.4 | −14.2 |
| Labor | | 13,111 | 24.9 | +6.9 |
| Ind. Nationalist | William Fell | 6,965 | 13.2 | +1.9 |
| Independent | Alick Kay | 5,126 | 9.7 | +9.7 |
| Independent | Mary Williams | 2,278 | 4.3 | +4.3 |
| Independent | Alfred Waterhouse | 657 | 1.3 | +1.3 |
| Protestant Labour | | 542 | 1.0 | +1.0 |
| Independent | Harry Meatheringham | 14 | 0.03 | −0.08 |

=== Northern Tableland ===
1925 New South Wales state election: Northern Tablelands
| Party | Candidate | Votes | % | ±% |
|---|---|---|---|---|
| Quota | | 5,924 | | |
| Progressive | Michael Bruxner (elected 1) | 9,944 | 42.0 | +2.9 |
| Progressive | David Drummond (elected 3) | 3,125 | 13.2 | −1.8 |
| Progressive | Daniel Lewis | 881 | 3.7 | +3.7 |
| Labor | Alfred McClelland (elected 2) | 8,464 | 35.7 | +8.7 |
| Labor | William McArdle | 946 | 4.0 | +1.0 |
| Labor | Dennis Shanahan | 335 | 1.4 | +1.4 |
| Total formal votes | | 23,695 | 96.2 | +0.8 |
| Informal votes | | 924 | 3.8 | −0.8 |
| Turnout | | 24,619 | 68.0 | +2.5 |
Party total votes
| Progressive | | 13,950 | 58.9 | +2.4 |
| Labor | | 9,745 | 41.1 | +9.3 |

=== Oxley ===
1925 New South Wales state election: Oxley
| Party | Candidate | Votes | % | ±% |
|---|---|---|---|---|
| Quota | | 7,483 | | |
| Progressive | Roy Vincent (elected 2) | 6,333 | 21.2 | +8.6 |
| Progressive | Henry Morton | 3,423 | 11.4 | +11.4 |
| Progressive | Ray Fitzgerald | 1,203 | 4.0 | +4.0 |
| Progressive | William Flannery | 955 | 3.2 | +3.2 |
| Nationalist | Theodore Hill (elected 3) | 5,598 | 18.7 | +5.9 |
| Nationalist | William Robinson | 2,092 | 7.0 | +7.0 |
| Nationalist | John Cameron | 1,468 | 4.9 | +4.9 |
| Labor | Joseph Fitzgerald (elected 1) | 8,761 | 29.3 | +15.4 |
| Labor | William Terry | 59 | 0.2 | +0.2 |
| Labor | James Goudie | 38 | 0.1 | +0.1 |
| Total formal votes | | 29,930 | 96.5 | −0.3 |
| Informal votes | | 1,068 | 3.5 | +0.3 |
| Turnout | | 30,998 | 69.8 | −3.2 |
Party total votes
| Progressive | | 11,914 | 39.8 | −4.9 |
| Nationalist | | 9,158 | 30.6 | +0.2 |
| Labor | | 8,858 | 29.6 | +6.3 |

=== Parramatta ===
1925 New South Wales state election: Parramatta
| Party | Candidate | Votes | % | ±% |
|---|---|---|---|---|
| Quota | | 9,426 | | |
| Labor | Jack Lang (elected 1) | 16,650 | 44.2 | +3.0 |
| Labor | Bill Ely (elected 3) | 1,964 | 5.2 | +2.6 |
| Labor | George Wrench | 272 | 0.7 | +0.7 |
| Nationalist | Albert Bruntnell (elected 2) | 13,053 | 34.6 | −8.4 |
| Nationalist | Thomas Morrow (defeated) | 2,841 | 7.5 | +4.8 |
| Nationalist | George Folkard | 1,759 | 4.7 | +4.7 |
| Protestant Labour | William Chalson | 515 | 1.4 | +1.4 |
| Independent | Albert Jones | 393 | 1.0 | +1.0 |
| Majority Labor | Cecil Robinson | 180 | 0.5 | +0.5 |
| Independent | Francis Silverstone | 74 | 0.2 | +0.2 |
| Total formal votes | | 37,701 | 97.3 | +0.9 |
| Informal votes | | 1,038 | 2.7 | −0.9 |
| Turnout | | 38,739 | 71.0 | −0.4 |
Party total votes
| Labor | | 18,886 | 50.1 | +5.7 |
| Nationalist | | 17,653 | 46.8 | −6.8 |
| Protestant Labour | | 515 | 1.4 | +1.4 |
| Independent | Albert Jones | 393 | 1.0 | +1.0 |
| Majority Labor | | 180 | 0.5 | +0.5 |
| Independent | Francis Silverstone | 74 | 0.2 | +0.2 |

=== Ryde ===
1925 New South Wales state election: Ryde
| Party | Candidate | Votes | % | ±% |
|---|---|---|---|---|
| Quota | | 10,908 | | |
| Nationalist | Thomas Henley (elected 1) | 16,512 | 25.2 | −3.0 |
| Nationalist | Thomas Bavin (elected 2) | 11,844 | 18.1 | +9.4 |
| Nationalist | David Anderson (elected 3) | 8,312 | 12.7 | −0.9 |
| Nationalist | Edward Sanders (elected 5) | 2,206 | 3.4 | +3.4 |
| Nationalist | Herbert Small | 1,955 | 3.0 | −0.6 |
| Labor | Robert Greig (elected 4) | 8,894 | 13.6 | −0.9 |
| Labor | Stan Taylor | 6,154 | 9.4 | +9.4 |
| Labor | James Concannon | 2,867 | 4.4 | +4.4 |
| Labor | William McCristal | 903 | 1.4 | +1.4 |
| Labor | Edward Lamont | 620 | 1.0 | +1.0 |
| Protestant Labour | James Chamberlain | 1,189 | 1.8 | +1.8 |
| Protestant Labour | William Featherstone | 882 | 1.4 | +1.4 |
| Ind. Nationalist | Cecil Brierley | 1,679 | 2.6 | +2.6 |
| Progressive | Crawford Vaughan | 805 | 1.2 | +1.2 |
| Progressive | Ernest Thompson | 461 | 0.7 | −0.9 |
| Independent | John Pattison | 163 | 0.3 | +0.3 |
| Total formal votes | | 65,446 | 97.2 | +0.1 |
| Informal votes | | 1,869 | 2.8 | −0.1 |
| Turnout | | 67,315 | 70.4 | −3.9 |
Party total votes
| Nationalist | | 40,829 | 62.4 | −9.7 |
| Labor | | 19,438 | 29.7 | +4.1 |
| Protestant Labour | | 2,071 | 3.2 | +3.2 |
| Ind. Nationalist | Cecil Brierley | 1,679 | 2.6 | +2.6 |
| Progressive | | 1,266 | 1.9 | +0.3 |
| Independent | John Pattison | 163 | 0.3 | +0.3 |

=== St George ===
1925 New South Wales state election: St George
| Party | Candidate | Votes | % | ±% |
|---|---|---|---|---|
| Quota | | 10,607 | | |
| Nationalist | Thomas Ley (elected 1) | 16,171 | 25.4 | +6.4 |
| Nationalist | Guy Arkins (elected 3) | 4,393 | 6.9 | −9.5 |
| Nationalist | William Bagnall (defeated) | 3,979 | 6.2 | −2.9 |
| Nationalist | Cecil Monro | 3,528 | 5.5 | +5.5 |
| Nationalist | Francis Farrar | 1,227 | 1.9 | −0.7 |
| Nationalist | Reginald Reid | 608 | 1.0 | +1.0 |
| Nationalist | Thomas Casserly | 497 | 0.8 | +0.8 |
| Labor | Mark Gosling (elected 2) | 11,731 | 18.4 | +2.5 |
| Labor | Joseph Cahill (elected 5) | 6,203 | 9.8 | +9.8 |
| Labor | George Cann (elected 4) | 6,166 | 9.7 | −3.2 |
| Labor | George Burns | 4,790 | 7.5 | +7.5 |
| Labor | Ernest Sheiles | 1,472 | 2.3 | +2.3 |
| Protestant Labour | Walter Anderson | 1,068 | 1.7 | +1.7 |
| Protestant Labour | Arthur Jones | 612 | 1.0 | +1.0 |
| Protestant Labour | Roy Hindwood | 439 | 0.7 | +0.7 |
| Protestant Labour | William Goulden | 313 | 0.5 | +0.5 |
| Protestant Labour | James Dunlop | 195 | 0.3 | +0.3 |
| Independent | Alfred Dicker | 182 | 0.3 | +0.3 |
| Independent | John Cooper | 39 | 0.1 | −0.1 |
| Independent | Ernest Lambourne | 26 | 0.04 | +0.04 |
| Total formal votes | | 63,639 | 96.2 | −0.2 |
| Informal votes | | 2,487 | 3.8 | +0.2 |
| Turnout | | 66,126 | 73.3 | −0.2 |
Party total votes
| Nationalist | | 30,403 | 47.8 | −5.6 |
| Labor | | 30,362 | 47.7 | +5.6 |
| Protestant Labour | | 2,627 | 4.1 | +4.1 |
| Independent | Alfred Dicker | 182 | 0.3 | +0.3 |
| Independent | John Cooper | 39 | 0.1 | −0.1 |
| Independent | Ernest Lambourne | 26 | 0.04 | +0.04 |

=== Sturt ===
1925 New South Wales state election: Sturt
| Party | Candidate | Votes | % | ±% |
|---|---|---|---|---|
| Quota | | 4,423 | | |
| Labor | Mat Davidson (elected 1) | 7,237 | 40.9 | +9.6 |
| Labor | Ted Horsington (elected 2) | 4,493 | 25.4 | +21.3 |
| Labor | Thomas Griffiths | 1,046 | 5.9 | +5.9 |
| Nationalist | Brian Doe (elected 3) | 4,355 | 24.6 | +5.1 |
| Nationalist | William Shoobridge | 378 | 2.1 | +2.1 |
| Nationalist | Francis Harvey | 96 | 0.5 | +0.5 |
| Independent | Charles Dooley | 85 | 0.5 | +0.5 |
| Total formal votes | | 17,690 | 95.0 | +0.5 |
| Informal votes | | 934 | 5.0 | −0.5 |
| Turnout | | 18,624 | 60.3 | +0.9 |
Party total votes
| Labor | | 12,776 | 72.2 | +25.8 |
| Nationalist | | 4,829 | 27.3 | −5.7 |
| Independent | Charles Dooley | 85 | 0.5 | +0.5 |

=== Sydney ===
1925 New South Wales state election: Sydney
| Party | Candidate | Votes | % | ±% |
|---|---|---|---|---|
| Quota | | 5,852 | | |
| Labor | John Birt (elected 1) | 9,152 | 26.1 | +11.8 |
| Labor | Michael Burke (elected 2) | 5,354 | 15.3 | +5.9 |
| Labor | William Holdsworth (elected 4) | 2,796 | 8.0 | +8.0 |
| Labor | Patrick Minahan | 2,403 | 6.8 | −3.1 |
| Labor | Francis McGuinness | 1,668 | 4.8 | +4.8 |
| Nationalist | Joseph Jackson (elected 3) | 5,096 | 14.5 | +1.7 |
| Nationalist | Daniel Levy (elected 5) | 4,586 | 13.1 | +4.8 |
| Nationalist | Albert Higgs | 1,494 | 4.3 | +4.3 |
| Nationalist | Gordon Stead | 231 | 0.7 | +0.7 |
| Nationalist | Reuben Kefford | 74 | 0.2 | +0.2 |
| Young Australia | Greg McGirr | 1,333 | 3.8 | +3.8 |
| Young Australia | Leslie Milgate | 15 | 0.04 | +0.04 |
| Young Australia | Alphonsus Cannon | 14 | 0.04 | +0.04 |
| Young Australia | Charles Mortimer | 11 | 0.03 | +0.03 |
| Communist | Jock Garden | 317 | 0.9 | +0.9 |
| Communist | Patrick Drew | 17 | 0.1 | +0.1 |
| Protestant Labour | Laurence Raw | 323 | 0.9 | +0.9 |
| Independent | Robert Bates | 162 | 0.5 | +0.5 |
| Independent | Charles Foster | 32 | 0.1 | +0.1 |
| Independent | James Jones | 21 | 0.1 | +0.1 |
| Independent | Edwin Miller | 8 | 0.02 | −0.05 |
| Total formal votes | | 35,107 | 96.1 | +0.4 |
| Informal votes | | 1,410 | 3.9 | −0.4 |
| Turnout | | 36,517 | 58.0 | −0.1 |
Party total votes
| Labor | | 21,373 | 60.9 | +6.3 |
| Nationalist | | 11,481 | 32.7 | −2.8 |
| Young Australia | | 1,373 | 3.9 | +3.9 |
| Communist | | 334 | 1.0 | +1.0 |
| Protestant Labour | | 323 | 0.9 | +0.9 |
| Independent | Robert Bates | 162 | 0.5 | +0.5 |
| Independent | Charles Foster | 32 | 0.1 | +0.1 |
| Independent | James Jones | 21 | 0.1 | +0.1 |
| Independent | Edwin Miller | 8 | 0.02 | −0.05 |

=== Wammerawa ===
1925 New South Wales state election: Wammerawa
| Party | Candidate | Votes | % | ±% |
|---|---|---|---|---|
| Quota | | 6,717 | | |
| Labor | Bill Dunn (elected 1) | 8,680 | 32.3 | +6.2 |
| Labor | Joseph Clark (elected 2) | 5,078 | 18.9 | +0.6 |
| Labor | John Ritchie | 1,352 | 5.0 | +5.0 |
| Progressive | Harold Thorby (elected 3) | 4,664 | 17.4 | +6.5 |
| Progressive | Alfred Yeo | 788 | 2.9 | +2.9 |
| Progressive | Samuel Armstrong | 721 | 2.7 | +2.7 |
| Nationalist | Harold Blackett | 3,367 | 12.5 | +12.5 |
| Nationalist | John Macdonald | 1,566 | 5.8 | +0.8 |
| Nationalist | Henry Buttsworth | 650 | 2.4 | +2.4 |
| Total formal votes | | 26,866 | 97.0 | +0.7 |
| Informal votes | | 823 | 3.0 | −0.7 |
| Turnout | | 27,689 | 72.9 | +1.6 |
Party total votes
| Labor | | 15,110 | 56.2 | +8.7 |
| Progressive | | 6,173 | 23.0 | −6.2 |
| Nationalist | | 5,583 | 20.8 | +8.6 |

=== Western Suburbs ===
1925 New South Wales state election: Western Suburbs
| Party | Candidate | Votes | % | ±% |
|---|---|---|---|---|
| Quota | | 8,320 | | |
| Nationalist | John Ness (elected 2) | 9,016 | 18.1 | +1.9 |
| Nationalist | Tom Hoskins (elected 4) | 6,975 | 14.0 | −2.4 |
| Nationalist | Milton Jarvie (elected 5) | 3,980 | 8.0 | +8.0 |
| Nationalist | Henry Morton | 2,443 | 4.9 | +4.9 |
| Nationalist | William Simpson | 1,865 | 3.7 | +0.6 |
| Labor | Edward McTiernan (elected 1) | 11,239 | 22.5 | +3.2 |
| Labor | Carlo Lazzarini (elected 3) | 7,697 | 15.4 | +1.3 |
| Labor | Barney Olde | 774 | 1.6 | +1.6 |
| Labor | James Troy | 649 | 1.3 | +1.3 |
| Labor | Roger Ryan | 99 | 0.2 | +0.2 |
| Independent | Alexander Huie | 3,976 | 8.0 | +2.6 |
| Protestant Labour | Frederick Armstrong | 578 | 1.2 | +1.2 |
| Protestant Labour | Alfred Millington | 490 | 1.0 | +1.0 |
| Majority Labor | John Cain | 133 | 0.3 | +0.3 |
| Total formal votes | | 49,914 | 97.5 | +0.6 |
| Informal votes | | 1,253 | 2.5 | −0.6 |
| Turnout | | 51,167 | 70.7 | −3.3 |
Party total votes
| Nationalist | | 24,279 | 48.6 | −9.3 |
| Labor | | 20,458 | 41.0 | +5.0 |
| Independent | Alexander Huie | 3,976 | 8.0 | +8.0 |
| Protestant Labour | | 1,068 | 2.1 | +2.1 |
| Majority Labor | | 133 | 0.3 | +0.3 |

=== Wollondilly ===
1925 New South Wales state election: Wollondilly
| Party | Candidate | Votes | % | ±% |
|---|---|---|---|---|
| Quota | | 7,924 | | |
| Labor | Billy Davies (elected 1) | 12,428 | 39.2 | +10.8 |
| Labor | Andrew Lysaght (elected 3) | 3,525 | 11.1 | +11.1 |
| Labor | Patrick Malloy | 417 | 1.3 | +1.3 |
| Nationalist | Sir George Fuller (elected 2) | 11,144 | 35.2 | −4.6 |
| Nationalist | Mark Morton (defeated) | 3,148 | 9.9 | −1.3 |
| Nationalist | Alexander South | 141 | 0.4 | +0.4 |
| Progressive | William Howarth | 673 | 2.1 | −0.4 |
| Ind. Nationalist | Samuel Emmett | 204 | 0.4 | +0.4 |
| Independent | Edward Newton | 10 | 0.03 | +0.03 |
| Total formal votes | | 31,690 | 97.4 | +1.1 |
| Informal votes | | 830 | 2.6 | −1.1 |
| Turnout | | 32,520 | 75.0 | −0.4 |
Party total votes
| Labor | | 16,370 | 51.7 | +8.5 |
| Nationalist | | 14,433 | 45.5 | −7.8 |
| Progressive | | 673 | 2.1 | −0.4 |
| Ind. Nationalist | Samuel Emmett | 204 | 0.4 | +0.4 |
| Independent | Edward Newton | 10 | 0.03 | +0.03 |

== See also ==
- Candidates of the 1925 New South Wales state election
- Members of the New South Wales Legislative Assembly, 1925–1927
