= Members of the New South Wales Legislative Assembly, 1922–1925 =

Members of the New South Wales Legislative Assembly who served in the 26th parliament of New South Wales held heir seats from 1922 to 1925. They were elected at the 1922 state election on 25 March 1922. The Speaker was Daniel Levy.

Name	Party	Electorate	Term in office'
David Anderson	Nationalist	Ryde	1920–1930
Guy Arkins	Nationalist	St George	1915–1930, 1938–1941
Richard Arthur	Nationalist	North Shore	1904–1932
William Ashford (Note: Wammerawa Independent MLA William Ashford's election was overturned on appeal. He was replaced by Joseph Clark on 1 August 1922.)	Independent	Wammerawa	1910–1922
Jack Baddeley	Labor	Newcastle	1922–1949
William Bagnall	Nationalist	St George	1913–1925, 1925–1927
Jack Bailey	Labor/Independent (Note: Goulburn MLA John Bailey was expelled from the Labor party in 1924.)	Goulburn	1918–1925
Richard Ball	Nationalist	Murray	1895–1898, 1904–1937
Thomas Bavin	Nationalist	Ryde	1917–1935
Walter Bennett	Nationalist	Maitland	1889–1902, 1917–1934
John Birt	Labor	Sydney	1919–1925
Albert Bruntnell	Nationalist	Parramatta	1906–1907, 1910–1913, 1919–1929
Michael Bruxner	Progressive	Northern Tablelands	1920–1962
Frank Burke	Labor	Botany	1917–1944
Ernest Buttenshaw	Progressive	Murrumbidgee	1917–1938
William Cameron	Nationalist	Maitland	1918–1931
George Cann	Labor	St George	1914–1927
Frank Chaffey	Nationalist	Namoi	1913–1940
Joseph Clark	Labor	Wammerawa	1920–1927, 1930–1932
Sir Arthur Cocks (Note: North Shore Nationalist MLA Sir Arthur Cocks resigned in March 1925 to take the position of Agent-General. He was replaced by Alfred Reid on 24 March.)	Nationalist	North Shore	1910–1925
Hugh Connell	Labor	Newcastle	1920–1934
Magnus Cromarty	Nationalist	Newcastle	1922–1925
Mat Davidson	Labor	Sturt	1918–1949
Billy Davies	Labor	Wollondilly	1917–1949
Brian Doe	Nationalist	Sturt	1917–1927
James Dooley	Labor	Bathurst	1907–1927
David Drummond	Progressive	Northern Tablelands	1920–1949
Bill Dunn	Labor	Wammerawa	1910–1911, 1911–1932, 1935–1950
Cyril Fallon	Democratic	Eastern Suburbs	1922–1925
William Fell	Independent Coalitionist	North Shore	1922–1927
Joseph Fitzgerald	Labor	Oxley	1920–1927, 1930–1932
John Fitzpatrick	Nationalist	Bathurst	1895–1904, 1907–1930
William FitzSimons	Nationalist	Cumberland	1922–1926
Martin Flannery	Labor	Murrumbidgee	1920–1932
Sir George Fuller	Nationalist	Wollondilly	1889–1894, 1915–1928
Hyman Goldstein	Nationalist	Eastern Suburbs	1922–1928
Mark Gosling	Labor	St George	1920–1932
Robert Greig	Labor	Ryde	1920–1927, 1941–1947
Arthur Grimm	Nationalist	Murrumbidgee	1913–1925
Sir Thomas Henley	Nationalist	Ryde	1904–1935
Theodore Hill	Nationalist	Oxley	1920–1927
Ted Horsington (Note: Stuart Labor MLA Jabez Wright died on 10 September 1922. He was replaced by Ted Horsington on 30 September.)	Labor	Sturt	1922–1947
Tom Hoskins	Nationalist	Western Suburbs	1913–1927
Joseph Jackson	Nationalist	Sydney	1922–1956
Harold Jaques	Nationalist	Eastern Suburbs	1920–1930
Tom Keegan	Labor	Balmain	1910–1920, 1921–1935
Matthew Kilpatrick	Progressive	Murray	1920–1941
Albert Lane	Nationalist	Balmain	1922–1927
Jack Lang	Labor	Parramatta	1913–1943, 1943–1946
Carlo Lazzarini	Labor	Western Suburbs	1917–1952
John Lee	Nationalist	Botany	1920–1930, 1932–1941
Daniel Levy	Nationalist	Sydney	1901–1937
Thomas Ley	Nationalist	St George	1917–1925
Peter Loughlin	Labor	Cootamundra	1917–1927, 1932–1935
Edward Loxton	Nationalist	Ryde	1920–1925
Hugh Main	Progressive	Cootamundra	1922–1938
Alfred McClelland	Labor	Northern Tablelands	1920–1927, 1930–1932
Greg McGirr	Labor/Young Australia (Note: Sydney MLA Greg McGirr left the Labor in 1923 and founded the Young Australia Party.)	Sydney	1913–1925
James McGirr	Labor	Cootamundra	1922–1952
William McKell	Labor	Botany	1917–1947
Edward McTiernan	Labor	Western Suburbs	1920–1927
Patrick Minahan	Labor	Sydney	1910–1917, 1920–1925, 1925–1927
William Missingham	Progressive	Byron	1922–1933
Voltaire Molesworth	Labor	Cumberland	1920–1925
Thomas Morrow	Nationalist	Parramatta	1922–1925
Mark Morton	Nationalist	Wollondilly	1901–1920, 1922–1938
Cecil Murphy	Labor	North Shore	1920–1927
David Murray	Labor	Newcastle	1921–1928
Thomas Mutch	Labor	Botany	1917–1930, 1938–1941
George Nesbitt	Nationalist	Byron	1913–1925
John Ness	Nationalist	Western Suburbs	1922–1930, 1932–1938
Charles Oakes	Nationalist	Eastern Suburbs	1901–1910, 1917–1925
William O'Brien	Labor	Murray	1917–1925
Walter O'Hearn	Labor	Maitland	1920–1932
Bob O'Halloran	Labor	Eastern Suburbs	1920–1927, 1941–1947
Stephen Perdriau	Nationalist	Byron	1920–1925
John Perkins	Nationalist	Goulburn	1921–1926
John Quirk	Labor	Balmain	1917–1938
Bill Ratcliffe	Labor	Botany	1922–1932
Alfred Reid	Nationalist	North Shore	1920–1922, 1925–1945
Sir Charles Rosenthal	Nationalist	Bathurst	1922–1925
Thomas Rutledge	Progressive	Goulburn	1920–1925
Patrick Scully (Note: Namoi Labor MLA Patrick Scully resigned in September 1923. He was replaced by his brother William Scully on 20 September.)	Labor	Namoi	1920–1923
William Scully	Labor	Namoi	1923–1932
Walter Skelton	Independent	Newcastle	1922–1927
Robert Stopford	Nationalist	Balmain	1922–1925
Robert Stuart-Robertson	Labor	Balmain	1907–1933
Harold Thorby	Progressive	Wammerawa	1922–1930
Roy Vincent	Progressive	Oxley	1922–1953
Bruce Walker	Nationalist	Cumberland	1917–1932
Walter Wearne	Nationalist	Namoi	1917–1930
Reginald Weaver	Nationalist	North Shore	1917–1925, 1927–1945
James Wilson	Nationalist	Western Suburbs	1920–1925
Jabez Wright	Labor	Sturt	1913–1920, 1921–1922

Under the provisions of the Parliamentary Elections (Casual Vacancies) Act, casual vacancies were filled by the next unsuccessful candidate on the departing member's party list. If an Independent member retired, the Clerk of the Assembly determined who would fill the vacancy based on the departing members voting record in questions of confidence.

== See also ==
- Second Fuller ministry
- Results of the 1922 New South Wales state election
- Candidates of the 1922 New South Wales state election
