= Members of the New South Wales Legislative Assembly, 1925–1927 =

Members of the New South Wales Legislative Assembly who served in the 27th parliament of New South Wales held their seats from 1925 to 1927. They were elected at the 1925 state election on 30 May 1925. The Speaker was James Dooley.

Name	Party	Electorate	Term in office'
Septimus Alldis	Labor	Eastern Suburbs	1925–1927
David Anderson	Nationalist	Ryde	1920–1930
Guy Arkins	Nationalist	St George	1915–1930, 1938–1941
Richard Arthur	Nationalist	North Shore	1904–1932
Jack Baddeley	Labor	Newcastle	1922–1949
William Bagnall (Note: St George Nationalist MLA Thomas Ley resigned in September 1925 to successfully contest the seat of Barton at the 1925 federal election. He was replaced by William Bagnall on 30 September.)	Nationalist	St George	1913–1925, 1925–1927
Richard Ball	Nationalist	Murray	1895–1898, 1904–1937
Henry Bate (Note: Goulburn Nationalist MLA John Perkins resigned in January 1926 to successfully contest a by-election for the federal seat of Eden-Monaro. He was replaced by Henry Bate on 21 January.)	Nationalist	Goulburn	1926–1941
Thomas Bavin	Nationalist	Ryde	1917–1935
Walter Bennett	Nationalist	Maitland	1889–1902, 1917–1934
Edmund Best	Nationalist	Murrumbidgee	1925–1930
John Birt (Note: Sydney Labor MLA John Birt died on 21 June 1925. He was replaced by Patrick Minahan on 24 June.)	Labor	Sydney	1919–1925
George Booth	Labor	Newcastle	1925–1960
Albert Bruntnell	Nationalist	Parramatta	1906–1907, 1910–1913, 1919–1929
Michael Bruxner	Progressive	Northern Tablelands	1920–1962
Frank Burke	Labor	Botany	1917–1944
Michael Burke	Labor	Sydney	1917–1922, 1925–1930
Ernest Buttenshaw	Progressive	Murrumbidgee	1917–1938
Joseph Cahill	Labor	St George	1925–1932, 1935–1959
William Cameron	Nationalist	Maitland	1918–1931
George Cann	Labor	St George	1914–1927
Frank Chaffey	Nationalist	Namoi	1913–1940
Joseph Clark	Labor	Wammerawa	1920–1927, 1930–1932
Hugh Connell	Labor	Newcastle	1920–1934
Mat Davidson	Labor	Sturt	1918–1949
Billy Davies	Labor	Wollondilly	1917–1949
Brian Doe	Nationalist	Sturt	1917–1927
James Dooley	Labor	Bathurst	1907–1927
David Drummond	Progressive	Northern Tablelands	1920–1949
Bill Dunn	Labor	Wammerawa	1910–1911, 1911–1932, 1935–1950
Bill Ely	Labor	Parramatta	1920–1922, 1925–1932
H. V. Evatt	Labor	Balmain	1925–1930
William Fell	Ind. Nationalist	North Shore	1922–1927
Joseph Fitzgerald	Labor	Oxley	1920–1927, 1930–1932
John Fitzpatrick	Nationalist	Bathurst	1895–1904, 1907–1930
William FitzSimons (Note: Cumberland Nationalist MLA William FitzSimons died on 20 March 1926. He was replaced by James Shand on 22 September.)	Nationalist	Cumberland	1922–1926
Martin Flannery	Labor	Murrumbidgee	1920–1932
William Foster	Nationalist	Eastern Suburbs	1925–1936
Sir George Fuller	Nationalist	Wollondilly	1889–1894, 1915–1928
Robert Gillies	Labor/Independent (Note: Byron MLA Robert Gillies and Murray MLA Vern Goodin were expelled from the Labor Party at its Easter conference in 1927. Both were allies of Loughlin and had been regular dissidents throughout the term, but had remained in the caucus through a deal with the party leadership; after a resounding victory for the leadership at the conference, they proceeded to expel both Gillies and Goodin. Both served out their terms as independents.)	Byron	1925–1927
Vern Goodin	Labor/Independent	Murray	1925–1927
Mark Gosling	Labor	St George	1920–1932
Robert Greig	Labor	Ryde	1920–1927, 1941–1947
Sir Thomas Henley	Nationalist	Ryde	1904–1935
Theodore Hill	Nationalist	Oxley	1920–1927
Ken Hoad	Labor	Cootamundra	1925–1932
William Holdsworth	Labor	Sydney	1925–1927
Ted Horsington	Labor	Sturt	1922–1947
Tom Hoskins	Nationalist	Western Suburbs	1913–1927
Joseph Jackson	Nationalist	Sydney	1922–1956
Harold Jaques	Nationalist	Eastern Suburbs	1920–1930
Milton Jarvie	Nationalist	Western Suburbs	1925–1929, 1929–1935
Alick Kay (Note: North Shore Independent MLA Alick Kay resigned on 28 July 1926 to take a position on the Metropolitan Meat Board. As he had supported the Lang Government in votes of confidence, the Clerk of the Parliament named the first unsuccessful Labor candidate in the North Shore seat, Arthur Tonge, as the replacement member on 22 September.)	Independent	North Shore	1925–1926
Tom Keegan	Labor	Balmain	1910–1920, 1921–1935
Gus Kelly	Labor	Bathurst	1925–1932, 1935–1967
Matthew Kilpatrick	Progressive	Murray	1920–1941
Albert Lane	Nationalist	Balmain	1922–1927
Jack Lang	Labor	Parramatta	1913–1943, 1943–1946
Carlo Lazzarini	Labor	Western Suburbs	1917–1952
John Lee	Nationalist	Botany	1920–1930, 1932–1941
Daniel Levy	Nationalist	Sydney	1901–1937
Thomas Ley	Nationalist	St George	1917–1925
Peter Loughlin	Labor/Independent (Note: Cootamundra MLA and former Labor Deputy Leader Peter Loughlin resigned from the party on 18 November 1926. He served out his term as an independent.)	Cootamundra	1917–1927, 1932–1935
Andrew Lysaght	Labor	Wollondilly	1925–1933
Hugh Main	Progressive	Cootamundra	1922–1938
Alfred McClelland	Labor	Northern Tablelands	1920–1927, 1930–1932
James McGirr	Labor	Cumberland	1922–1952
William McKell	Labor	Botany	1917–1947
Edward McTiernan	Labor	Western Suburbs	1920–1927
Patrick Minahan	Labor	Sydney	1910–1917, 1920–1925, 1925–1927
William Missingham	Progressive	Byron	1922–1933
Cecil Murphy	Labor	North Shore	1920–1927
David Murray	Labor	Newcastle	1921–1928
Thomas Mutch	Labor	Botany	1917–1930, 1938–1941
John Ness	Nationalist	Western Suburbs	1922–1930, 1932–1938
Walter O'Hearn	Labor	Maitland	1920–1932
Bob O'Halloran	Labor	Eastern Suburbs	1920–1927, 1941–1947
John Perkins	Nationalist	Goulburn	1921–1926
Millicent Preston-Stanley	Nationalist	Eastern Suburbs	1925–1927
John Quirk	Labor	Balmain	1917–1938
Bill Ratcliffe	Labor	Botany	1922–1932
Alfred Reid	Nationalist	North Shore	1920–1922, 1925–1945
Edward Sanders	Nationalist	Ryde	1925–1943
William Scully	Labor	Namoi	1923–1932
James Shand	Nationalist	Cumberland	1926–1944
Walter Skelton	Protestant Labour	Newcastle	1922–1927
Paddy Stokes	Labor	Goulburn	1925–1927
Frederick Stuart	Progressive	Byron	1925–1927
Robert Stuart-Robertson	Labor	Balmain	1907–1933
Harold Thorby	Progressive	Wammerawa	1922–1930
Arthur Tonge	Labor	North Shore	1926–1932, 1935–1962
Jack Tully	Labor	Goulburn	1925–1932, 1935–1946
Roy Vincent	Progressive	Oxley	1922–1953
Bruce Walker	Nationalist	Cumberland	1917–1932
Walter Wearne	Nationalist	Namoi	1917–1930

Under the provisions of the Parliamentary Elections (Casual Vacancies) Act, casual vacancies were filled by the next unsuccessful candidate on the departing member's party list. If an Independent member retired, the Clerk of the Assembly determined who would fill the vacancy based on the departing members voting record in questions of confidence.

== See also ==
- First Lang ministry
- Results of the 1925 New South Wales state election
- Candidates of the 1925 New South Wales state election
