= 1922 New South Wales state election =

State election for New South Wales, Australia in March 1922

| ← 1920 | 25 March 1922 | 1925 → |

All 90 seats in the New South Wales Legislative Assembly 46 Assembly seats were needed for a majority
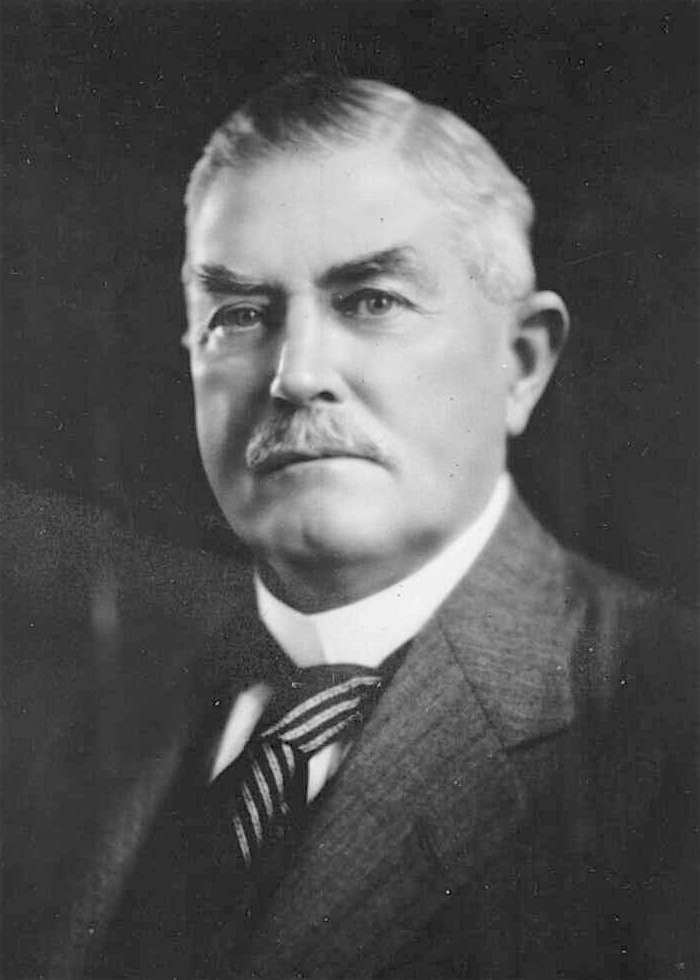

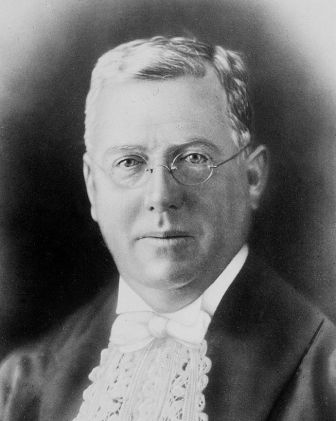
| | First party | Second party |
|---|---|---|
| Leader | George Fuller | James Dooley |
| Party | Nationalist | Labor |
| Leader since | 14 April 1920 | 5 October 1921 |
| Leader's seat | Wollondilly | Bathurst |
| Last election | 28 seats | 43 seats |
| Seats won | 41 seats | 36 seats |
| Seat change | ▲13 | ▼7 |
| Percentage | 43.17% | 38.48% |
| Swing | ▲13.25 | ▼4.60 |
- Results of the election
Premier before election
James Dooley
Labor
Elected Premier
George Fuller
Nationalist/Progressive coalition

The 1922 New South Wales state election was held on 25 March 1922. This election was for all of the 90 seats in the 26th New South Wales Legislative Assembly and it was conducted in multiple member constituencies using the Hare Clark single transferable vote. The 25th parliament of New South Wales was dissolved on 17 February 1922 by the Governor, Sir Walter Edward Davidson, on the advice of the Premier James Dooley.

== Key dates ==
| Date | Event |
|---|---|
| 17 February 1922 | The Legislative Assembly was dissolved, and writs were issued by the Governor to proceed with an election. |
| 25 February 1922 | Nominations for candidates for the election closed at noon. |
| 25 March 1922 | Polling day. |
| 13 April 1922 | Second Fuller ministry sworn in |
| 19 April 1922 | Writs returned. |
| 26 April 1922 | Opening of 25th Parliament. |

== Results ==
1922 New South Wales state election Legislative Assembly << 1920–1925 >>
| Enrolled voters | 1,251,023 | | | | |
| Votes cast | 875,464 | | Turnout | 70.00 | +13.81 |
| Informal votes | 31,771 | | Informal | 3.63 | −6.07 |
Summary of votes by party
| Party | Primary votes | % | Swing | Seats | Change |
| Nationalist | 364,211 | 43.17 | +13.25 | 41 | +13 |
| Labor | 324,677 | 38.48 | −4.60 | 36 | −7 |
| Progressive | 93,488 | 11.08 | −4.04 | 9 | −6 |
| Independent | 31,880 | 3.78 | −1.07 | 1 | 0 |
| Democratic | 14,354 | 1.70 | −0.69 | 1 | +1 |
| Independent Labor | 7,438 | 0.88 | +0.88 | 0 | |
| Ind. Coalitionist | 5,727 | 0.68 | +0.68 | 1 | +1 |
| Industrial Labor | 1,674 | 0.20 | +0.20 | 0 | |
| Soldier's Nationalist | 244 | 0.03 | +0.03 | 0 | |
| Total | 843,693 | | | 90 | |

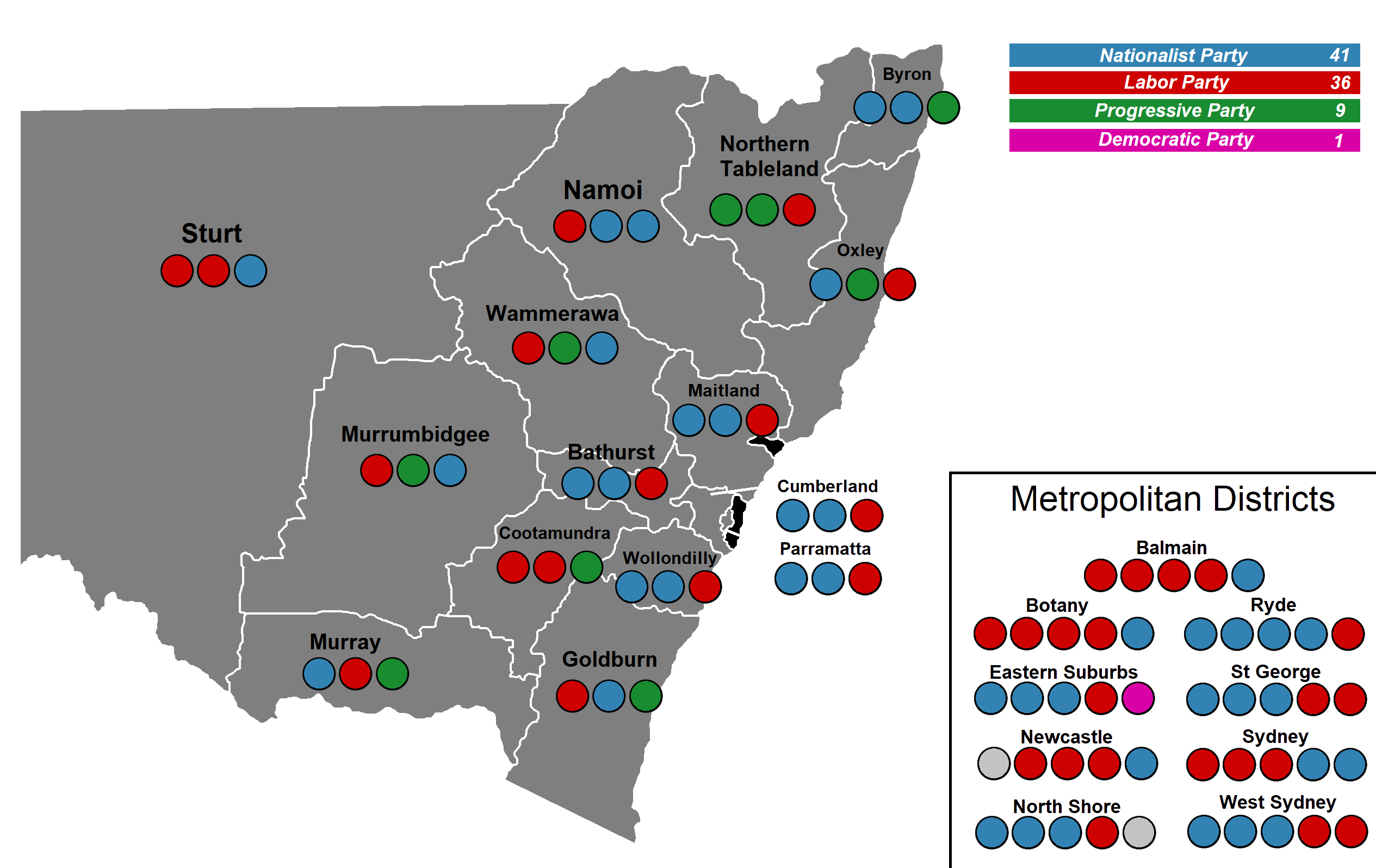
Results of 1922

Popular vote
| Nationalist | 43.17% |
| Labor | 38.48% |
| Progressive | 11.05% |
| Independent | 4.66% |
| Democratic | 1.70% |
| Ind. Coalitionist | 0.71% |
| Others | 0.20% |
Parliamentary seats
| Nationalist | 41 |
| Labor | 36 |
| Progressive | 9 |
| Independent | 2 |
| Democratic | 2 |
| Ind. Coalitionist | 1 |

== Retiring members ==
=== Labor ===
- Arthur Buckley MLA (Sydney)
- John Estell MLA (Newcastle) — appointed to the Legislative Council

=== Nationalist ===
- James Macarthur-Onslow MLA (Eastern Suburbs) — elected as Progressive

== Changing seats ==
Seats changing hands
| Seat | 1920 | | | Swing (Note: Swing is calculated using the Butler method, being the average of the winning party percentage-point gain and the losing party percentage-point loss. NA is used where one of the parties did not contest both elections.) | 1922 | | |
| Seat | Party | Member | ± | Swing | ± | Member | Party |
|---|---|---|---|---|---|---|---|
| Balmain | Labor | John Doyle | -6.3 | +12.6 | +18.8 | Robert Stopford | Nationalist |
| Bathurst | Labor | Valentine Johnston | -6.4 | +9.1 | +11.7 | Charles Rosenthal | Nationalist |
| Byron | Labor | Tom Swiney | +3.0 | +9.5 | +21.9 | William Missingham | Progressive |
| Eastern Suburbs | Progressive | James MacArthur-Onslow | -5.6 | +8.4 | +11.1 | Hyman Goldstein | Nationalist |
| Eastern Suburbs | Labor | Daniel Dwyer | -12.0 | +11.5 | +10.9 | Cyril Fallon | Democratic |
| Newcastle | Independent | Arthur Gardiner | -8.8 | +17.0 | +25.2 | Walter Skelton | Independent |
| North Shore | Ind. Nationalist | Alfred Reid | +0.4 | +5.5 | +11.3 | William Fell | Ind. Coalitionist |
| Oxley | Progressive | Richard Price | -10.5 | +11.5 | +12.4 | Theodore Hill | Nationalist |
| Parramatta | Labor | Bill Ely | -8.1 | +11.6 | +15.0 | Thomas Morrow | Nationalist |
| Sturt | Socialist Labor | Percy Brookfield (Note: The member for Sturt Percy Brookfield was murdered while trying to disarm a deranged man at Riverton on 22 March 1921. Which party interest Brookfield represented was not straightforward. He had been elected under the banner of the Socialist Labor Party at the 1920 election for Sturt, however he formed a new Industrial Labor Party in February 1921, shortly before his death. There was debate concerning who should be appointed. The Industrial Labor Party said that John O'Reilly should be appointed, while The Sydney Morning Herald stated that Thomas Hynes had the greater number of primary votes at the 1920 election and thus he should be appointed. The nomination had to come from the recognised party leader according to votes on any censure motion and Labor leader and Premier John Storey nominated Jabez Wright who took his seat on 30 August 1921.) | NA | NA | +0.7 | Jabez Wright | Labor |
| Sydney | Labor | Michael Burke | +1.0 | +3.2 | +7.3 | Joseph Jackson | Nationalist |
| Wammerawa | Labor | Joseph Clark | -9.0 | +8.7 | +8.3 | Harold Thorby | Progressive |
| Wollondilly | Labor | John Cleary | -9.2 | +8.3 | +7.3 | Mark Morton | Nationalist |
Members changing party
| Seat | 1920 | | | ± | 1922 | | |
| Seat | Party | Member | % | ± | % | Member | Party |
| Byron | Progressive | Stephen Perdriau | | | | Stephen Perdriau | Nationalist |
| Maitland | Progressive | Walter Bennett | | | | Walter Bennett | Nationalist |
| Namoi | Progressive | Walter Wearne | | | | Walter Wearne | Nationalist |
| Ryde | Ind. Nationalist | Edward Loxton | | | | Edward Loxton | Nationalist |
| Ryde | Progressive | Thomas Bavin | | | | Thomas Bavin | Nationalist |
| St George | Progressive | Thomas Ley | | | | Thomas Ley | Nationalist |
| Wammerawa | Nationalist | William Ashford | | | | William Ashford (Note: The returning officer declared that William Ashford had been re-elected. The result was overturned by the Elections and Qualifications Committee who declared that Joseph Clark had been elected instead.) | Independent |
| Western Suburbs | Progressive | James Wilson | | | | James Wilson | Nationalist |

== See also ==
- Candidates of the 1922 New South Wales state election
- Members of the New South Wales Legislative Assembly, 1922–1925
