= 1925 New South Wales state election =

State election for New South Wales, Australia in May 1925

- 30 May 1925

All 90 seats in the New South Wales Legislative Assembly 46 Assembly seats were needed for a majority
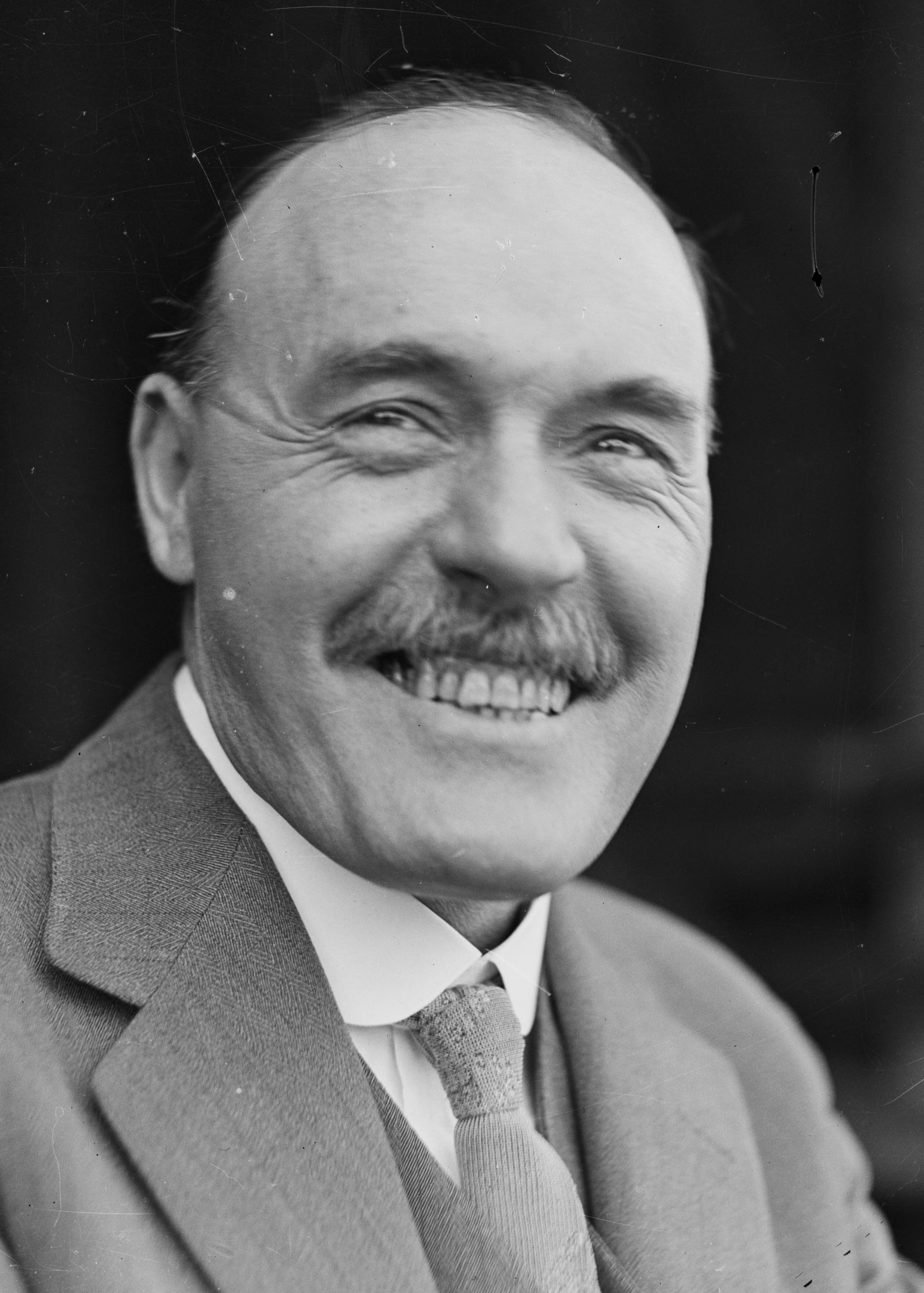

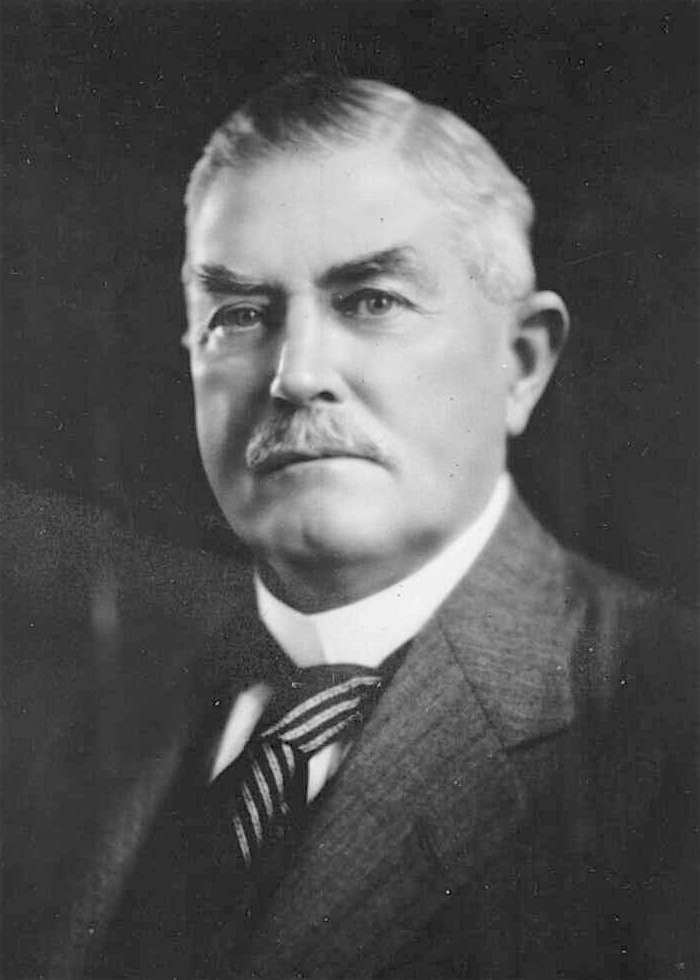
	First party	Second party
Leader	Jack Lang	George Fuller
Party	Labor	Nationalist/Progressive coalition
Leader since	31 July 1923	14 April 1920
Leader's seat	Parramatta	Wollondilly
Last election	36 seats	50 seats
Seats won	46 seats	41 seats
Seat change	▲9	▼9
Percentage	46.19%	47.02%
Swing	▲7.70	▼7.23
- Results of the election
Premier before election
George Fuller
Nationalist/Progressive coalition
Elected Premier
Jack Lang
Labor

The 1925 New South Wales state election was held on 30 May 1925. This election was for all of the 90 seats in the 27th New South Wales Legislative Assembly and was conducted in multiple-member constituencies using the Hare Clark single transferable vote. This was the last election to use STV to elect the NSW Assembly.

The 26th parliament of New South Wales was dissolved on 18 April 1925 by the Governor, Sir Dudley de Chair, on the advice of the Premier Sir George Fuller.

It was a close win for the Labor Party Leader, Jack Lang, which had a majority of just one seat in the Assembly, defeating Fuller's Nationalist/Progressive Coalition.

== Key dates ==
Date	Event
18 April 1925	The Legislative Assembly was dissolved, and writs were issued by the Governor to proceed with an election.
27 April 1925	Nominations for candidates for the election closed at noon.
30 May 1925	Polling day.
17 June 1925	First Lang ministry sworn in
24 June 1925	Opening of 27th Parliament.

== Results ==
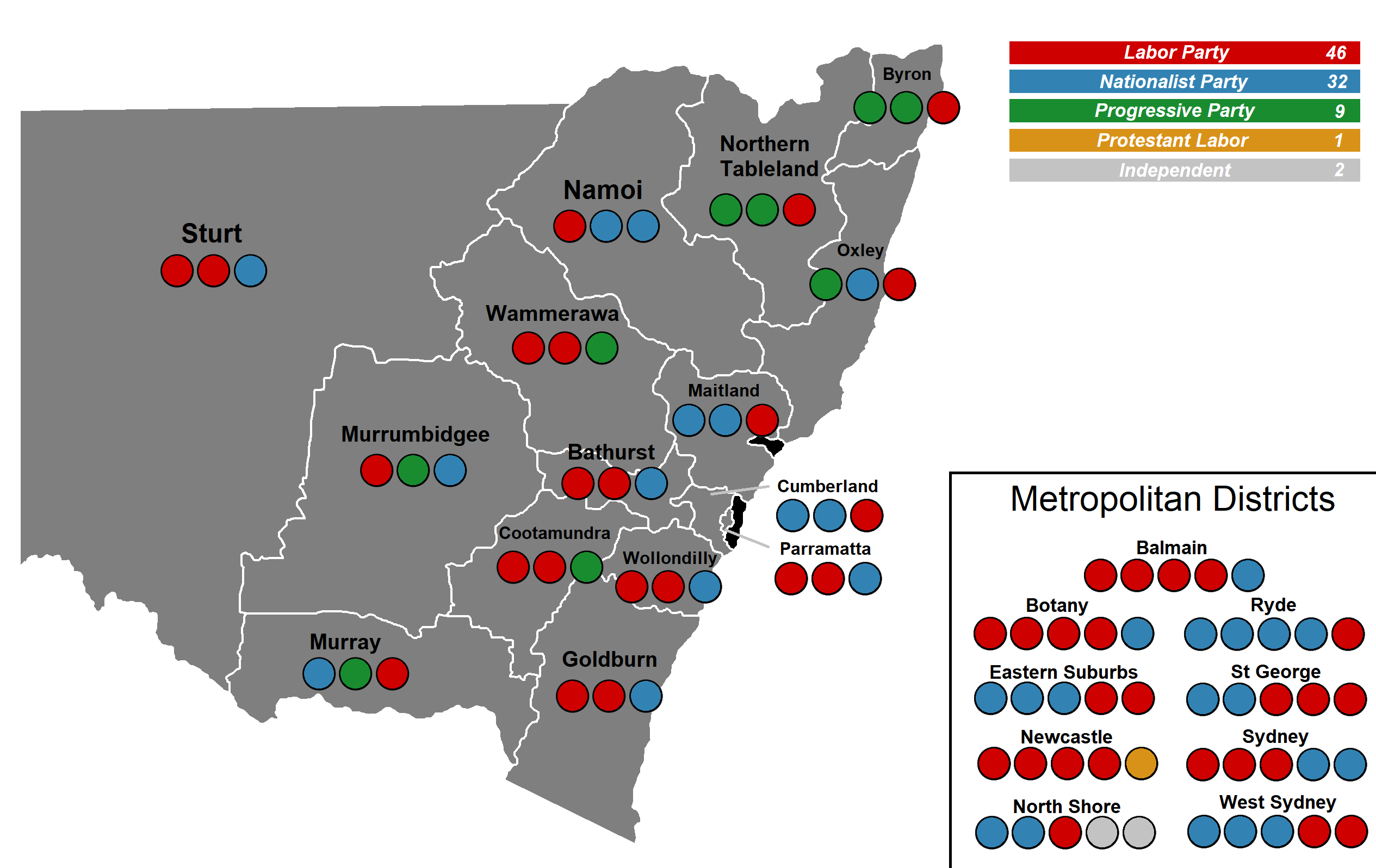
Results of 1925

New South Wales state election, 30 May 1925 Legislative Assembly << 1922–1927 >>
Enrolled voters	1,339,080				
Votes cast	924,979		Turnout	69.08	−0.93
Informal votes	30,155		Informal	3.26	−0.37
Summary of votes by party
Party	Primary votes	%	Swing	Seats	Change
Labor	413,275	46.19	+7.70	46	+9 (Note: Wammerawa has been included as a second Labor seat from the 1922 election. The returning officer declared that William Ashford (Independent) had been elected 3rd, however the Elections and Qualifications Committee upheld a petition by Joseph Clark (Labor) and after re-counting the votes declared that Clark had been elected.)
Nationalist	339,306	37.92	−5.25	32	−9
Progressive	81,450	9.10	−1.98	9	±0
Independent	23,454	2.62	−1.16	1	±0
Protestant Labour	22,843	2.55	+2.55	1	+1
Ind. Nationalist	6,965	0.78	+0.78	1	+1
Independent Labor	3,214	0.36	−0.52	0	±0
Protestant Independent National	1,883	0.21	+0.21	0	
Young Australia Party	1,407	0.16	+0.16	0	
Communist	831	0.09	+0.09	0	
Majority Labor	196	0.02	+0.02	0	
Total	894,824			90	

Popular vote
Labor	47.85%
Nationalist	36.26%
Progressive	9.10%
Independent	3.11%
Protestant Labor	2.55%
Ind. Nationalist	0.99%
Others	0.14%
Parliamentary seats
Labor	46
Nationalist	32
Progressive	9
Independent	1
Protestant Labor	1
Ind. Nationalist	1

== Retiring members ==
=== Nationalist ===
- Arthur Cocks (North Shore)
- Arthur Grimm (Murrumbidgee)
- Thomas Ley (St George) — retired to contest Barton at the 1925 federal election
- Edward Loxton (Ryde)
- George Nesbitt (Byron)
- Charles Oakes (Eastern Suburbs)
- Reginald Weaver (North Shore)
- James Wilson (Western Suburbs)

=== Progressive ===
- Thomas Rutledge (Goulburn)

=== Others ===
- John Bailey (Independent, Goulburn) — had been expelled from the Labor Party

== Changing seats ==
Seats changing hands
Seat	1922			Swing (Note: Swing is calculated using the Butler method, being the average of the winning party percentage-point gain and the losing party percentage-point loss. NA is used where one of the parties did not contest both elections.)	1925		
Seat	Party	Member	±	Swing	±	Member	Party
Balmain	Nationalist	Robert Stopford	-11.3	+13.3	+15.2	H. V. Evatt	Labor
Bathurst	Nationalist	Charles Rosenthal	-6.4	+9.1	+11.7	Gus Kelly	Labor
Byron	Nationalist	George Nesbitt	-41.2	+14.8	+9.0	Robert Gillies	Labor
Byron	Nationalist	Stephen Perdriau	-41.2	+26.4	+32.2	Frederick Stuart	Progressive
Eastern Suburbs	Democratic	Cyril Fallon	+0.2	+5.1	+10.4	Septimus Alldis	Labor
Goulburn	Progressive	Thomas Rutledge	-18.0	+13.6	+9.2	Paddy Stokes	Labor
Newcastle	Nationalist	Magnus Cromarty	-0.5	+12.9	+25.2	George Booth	Labor
North Shore	Nationalist	Arthur Cocks	-14.2	+12.0	+9.7	Alick Kay	Independent
Parramatta	Nationalist	Thomas Morrow	-6.8	+6.3	+5.7	Bill Ely	Labor
St George	Nationalist	William Bagnall	-5.6	+5.6	+5.6	Joseph Cahill	Labor
Wollondilly	Nationalist	Mark Morton	-7.8	+8.2	+8.5	Andrew Lysaght	Labor
Members changing party
Seat	1922			±	1925		
Seat	Party	Member	%	±	%	Member	Party
Newcastle	Independent	Walter Skelton				Walter Skelton	Protestant Labour

== See also ==
- Candidates of the 1925 New South Wales state election
- Members of the New South Wales Legislative Assembly, 1925–1927
