= James Fingleton =

Australian politician

The Honourable James Fingleton
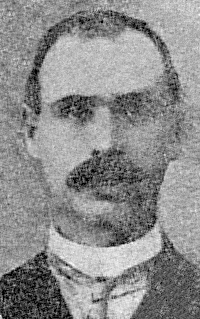

Member of Legislative Assembly of New South Wales
- In office 1913–1917

Personal details
- Born: 7 December 1876 London, England
- Died: 13 October 1920 (aged 43)
- Children: Jack Fingleton

James Fingleton, MLA (7 December 1876 – 13 October 1920) was an Australian politician. He served as a member of the New South Wales Legislative Assembly, and he was the father of the Australian Test cricketer Jack Fingleton.

== Biography ==
He was born in Melbourne, Victoria. He was the son of Irish Catholic migrants James Fingleton, a baker, and his wife Mary. The Fingletons moved to Sydney in 1878 before the death of his parents left Fingleton orphaned at an early age.

After a limited education, Fingleton gained work with the New South Wales Railway and Tramway Department, initially as a tram conductor before his promotion to tram driver. Fingleton also joined the Labor Party (ALP) and became active in the union movement, eventually becoming a union organiser.

He married Belinda May Webb in 1902 and together they had two daughters and four sons: Leslie (1904–1963), Catherine (1906–1999), John "Jack" (1908–1981), Glen (1912–1965), Walter (1915–2012), and Belinda (1917–2013).

Fingleton was elected as the ALP member for the Electoral district of Waverley in the New South Wales Legislative Assembly in December 1913 and served until 1917 when, in the wake of the ALP split over conscription (which he opposed), Fingleton lost his seat in a landslide election loss to the conservative Nationalist Party of Australia.

Fingleton returned to parliament as the member for Eastern Suburbs at the March 1920 election but died of tuberculosis at his Waverley home in October that year. He was buried at Waverley cemetery.

New South Wales Legislative Assembly
Preceded by James Macarthur-Onslow	Member for Waverley; 1913–1917	Succeeded by Charles Oakes
New seat	Member for Eastern Suburbs; 1920; Served alongside: Jaques, Macarthur-Onslow, Oakes, O'Halloran	Succeeded by Daniel Dwyer
