= Select committee =

Select committee may refer to:

- Select committee (parliamentary system), a committee made up of a small number of parliamentary members appointed to deal with particular areas or issues in a Westminster style of government, including the UK, Ireland, and countries colonised by the UK
- Select or special committee (United States Congress), a congressional committee appointed to perform a special function beyond the capacity of a standing committee

== See also ==
- Standing committee
