= Charles Oakes =

Australian politician (1861–1928)

The Honourable Charles Oakes CMG
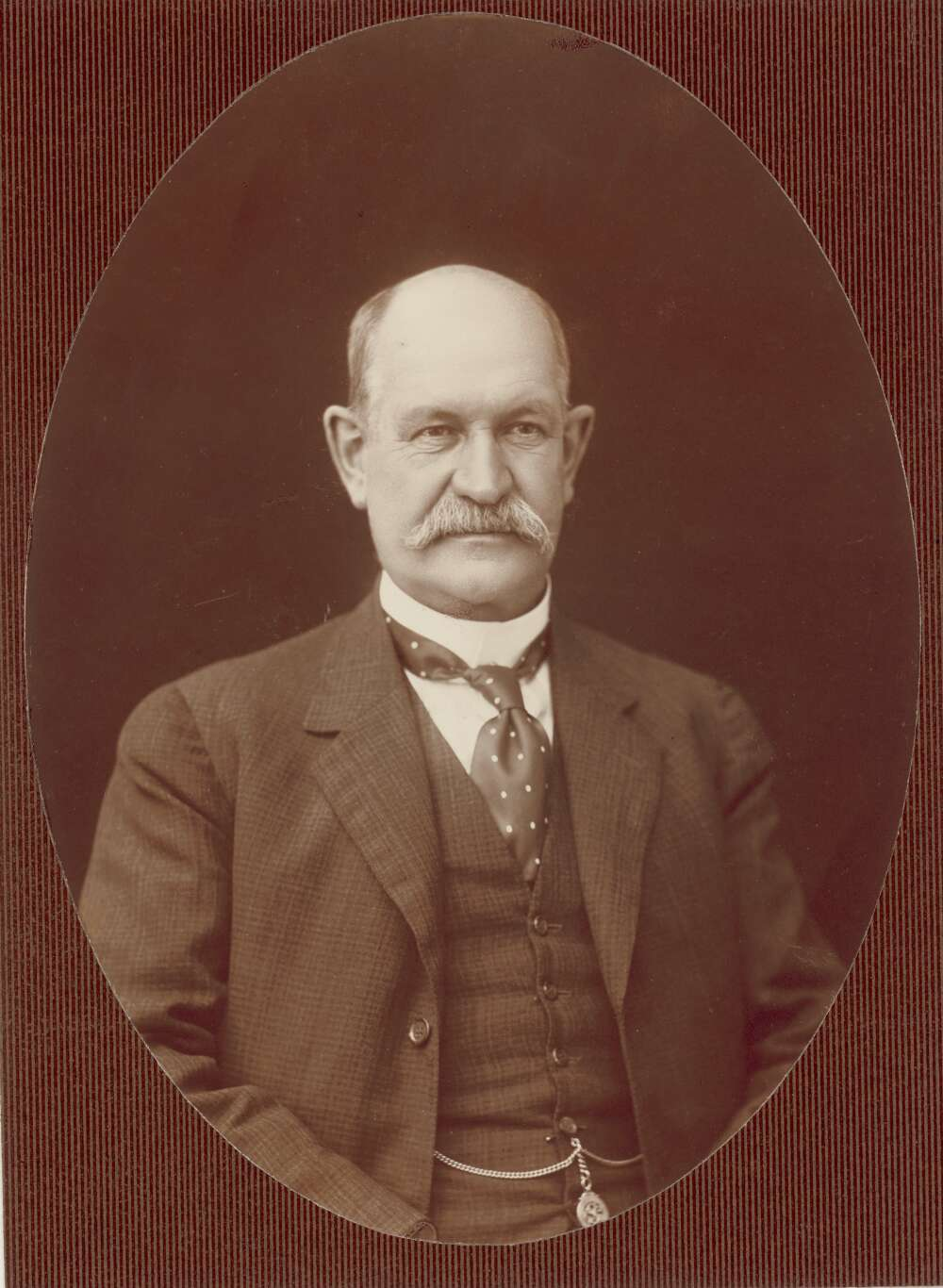

Senator for New South Wales
- In office 1 July 1913 – 5 September 1914

Personal details
- Born: 30 November 1861 Wagga Wagga, New South Wales
- Died: 2 July 1928 (aged 66) Bellevue Hill, New South Wales, Australia
- Party: Liberal Reform (1901–10); Comm. Liberal (1913–14); Nationalist (1917–22)
- Spouse: Elizabeth Gregory (m. 1885)
- Occupation: Jeweller

Charles William Oakes CMG (30 November 1861 – 2 July 1928) was an Australian politician and businessman. He was a long-serving member of the New South Wales Legislative Assembly (1901–1910, 1917–1925) and briefly served as a senator for New South Wales from 1913 to 1914, representing the Liberal Party. He was a state government minister from 1922 to 1925.

== Early life ==
Oakes was born on 30 November 1861 in Wagga Wagga, New South Wales. He was the son of Agnes Jane (née Revelle) and James Richards Oakes. His mother was born in Ireland and his father in England.

Oakes and his family moved to Sydney when he was nine years old, where he attended Paddington Superior Public School. After leaving school he served an apprenticeship with a watchmaker and jeweller. He established his own jewellery shop in 1891, located on Oxford Street in Paddington, and was able to retire from active involvement in the business in 1911. Oakes was a member of the Paddington and Woollahra Literary and Debating Society and took part in the union parliament of the Federation of Debating Societies. He served on the Paddington Municipal Council from 1897 to 1904.

== Early political involvement ==
Oakes during his service on the Paddington Municipal Council

Oakes joined the Labor Electoral League (the predecessor of the modern Australian Labor Party) in 1891 and supported free trade. He resigned his membership in 1894 in protest at the introduction of the solidarity pledge, part of the mass resignations which included party leader Joseph Cook.

In 1901, Oakes was elected to the New South Wales Legislative Assembly as a Liberal Party candidate for Paddington, and was re-elected in 1904 and 1907. He was appointed a minister without portfolio in the Wade ministry in 1907 until 1910, when he was one of three ministers defeated at the election.

== Federal politics ==
At the 1913 federal election, Oakes was elected to a six-year Senate term beginning on 1 July 1913. He stood on the Liberal Party's ticket in New South Wales. His term was cut short by a double dissolution and he lost his seat at the 1914 election after just over a year.

In parliament, Oakes was a fierce critic of the Labor Party's attempts to use its Senate majority to obstruct the Cook government, which had won a one-seat majority in the House of Representatives. He supported Prime Minister Joseph Cook's decision to request a double dissolution to resolve the situation, although it resulted in the early end of his Senate term. Oakes supported states' rights, including the right of state banks to operate independently of the Commonwealth Bank of Australia, and supported the government's bill to reintroduce postal voting. He opposed union preference and closed shops, and "maintained that Labor was betraying the principles of the Constitution by voting as a party in the Senate when the Senate was constitutionally a States House".

Oakes served on four Senate committees during his period in the Senate, including the select committees into allegations of misconduct at the 1913 election and the select committee into the Cook government's dismissal of Trans-Australian Railway engineer Henry Chinn. He successfully moved a motion requiring the latter to examine Chinn's qualifications.

== Return to state politics ==
Oakes returned to state politics and the Legislative Assembly, winning Waverley as a Nationalist in 1917, serving again as a minister without portfolio from 1919. He was elected as one of five members for Eastern Suburbs in 1920. He was Colonial Secretary and Minister for Public Health in the 7 hour Fuller ministry in 1921, and then served in the positions again in the second Fuller ministry from 1922 until 1925. He did not contest the 1925 election, having accepted an appointment to the Legislative Council, where he served until his death.

== Personal life ==
In 1885, Oakes married Elizabeth Gregory, with whom he had four children; two of his children predeceased him. His wife was a niece of the cricketing brothers Ned, Dave, Charles and Arthur Gregory.

Oakes served terms as president of the New South Wales Cricket Association and the New South Wales Rugby Union, and was a vice-president of the Royal Life Saving Society. As a jeweller he designed a commemorative gold medal for James McMahon, the manager of the 1908–09 Wallabies tour of the British Isles. He was also a trustee of the Sydney Cricket Ground and a member of the trusts for Clark Island and Shark Island.

Oakes died on 2 July 1928 at his home in Bellevue Hill, New South Wales, the result of a cerebral haemorrhage.

== Honours ==
He was appointed a Companion of the Order of St Michael and St George (CMG) on 3 June 1922.

Parliament of New South Wales
Political offices
Preceded by James Dooley	Colonial Secretary; 1921	Succeeded by James Dooley
Preceded by Greg McGirr	Minister for Public Health; 1921	Succeeded by Greg McGirr
Preceded by James Dooley	Colonial Secretary; 1922 – 1925	Succeeded by Carlo Lazzarini
Preceded by Greg McGirr	Minister for Public Health; 1922 – 1925	Succeeded by George Cann
New South Wales Legislative Assembly
Preceded by John Neild	Member for Paddington; 1901 – 1910	Succeeded by John Osborne
Preceded by James Fingleton	Member for Waverley; 1917 – 1920	District abolished
New district	Member for Eastern Suburbs; 1920 – 1925; With: Harold Jaques; James Fingleton / Daniel Dwyer / Cyril Fallon; James Macarthur-Onslow / Hyman Goldstein; Bob O'Halloran	Succeeded by Harold Jaques; Septimus Alldis; William Foster; Millicent Preston-Stanley
