= Daniel Dwyer =

Australian politician

Daniel Francis Dwyer (5 February 1871 – 30 July 1942) was an Australian politician.

He was born in Mount Kembla to miner Daniel Dwyer and Mary, née Hourigan. He worked as a shop assistant and eventually a storeman and was an organiser for the Shop Assistants Union from around 1915 to 1920. He was also involved in the Labor Council of New South Wales, serving on the executive in 1916 and as president from 1917 to 1918. In 1920 he was elected to the New South Wales Legislative Assembly as a Labor member for Eastern Suburbs, but he was defeated in 1922. He died in Sydney in 1942.

New South Wales Legislative Assembly
Preceded by James Fingleton	Member for Eastern Suburbs; 1920–1922; Served alongside: Jaques, Macarthur-Onslow, Oakes, O'Halloran	Succeeded by Cyril Fallon; Hyman Goldstein
