= William Foster (New South Wales politician, born 1865) =

Australian politician

The Honourable William Frederick Foster Esquire
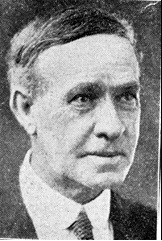

Mayor of Woollahra
- In office 8 December 1922 – 10 December 1925
- Preceded by: James Polidore Bradley
- Succeeded by: Leo Whitby Robinson

Member of the New South Wales Legislative Assembly for Eastern Suburbs
- In office 30 May 1925 – 7 September 1927
- Preceded by: Hyman Goldstein
- Succeeded by: Seat abolished

Member of the New South Wales Parliament for Vaucluse
- In office 8 October 1927 – 21 July 1936
- Preceded by: New seat
- Succeeded by: Murray Robson

Personal details
- Born: 29 August 1865 Brisbane, Colony of Queensland, British Empire
- Died: 21 July 1936 (aged 70) Sydney, New South Wales, Australia
- Party: Nationalist Party; United Australia Party
- Spouse: Ada Brees
- Children: Hugh Carlyle Foster; Frederick Brees Foster
- Profession: Builder, politician

William Frederick Foster (29 August 1865 – 21 July 1936) was an Australian building contractor, businessman, politician and member of the New South Wales Legislative Assembly.

== Early life ==
William Foster was born in Brisbane to builder William Foster and Rebecca, née Harwood, who were English migrants.

The family initially moved to Melbourne, where William was educated at a public school. They then relocated to Sydney while William was a teenager.

== Building career ==
Foster started life as a carpenter in 1882, and he held various jobs with building-related companies, eventually becoming a partner in a successful construction business with his father and brother in 1883. In 1891, he established his own firm in the building industry, W. F. Foster and Co.

He served as an executive member on numerous boards and committees. He was a member of the Master Builders' Association of New South Wales from 1914 to 1921, serving as vice-president in 1916-17 and president in 1918.

He was the sole examiner in carpentry and joinery for the Sydney Technical College (which later became TAFE NSW) in 1917.

In 1925, Foster's timber and joinery works in Redfern were destroyed by fire.

== Political career ==
Following a successful career as a builder, Foster entered politics in 1920 at the age of 55. By this time he had built a reputation as a well-known builder and contractor.

From 1920 to 1936 he served on Woollahra Council, and was mayor from 1923 to 1925. During his term as mayor, he launched improvements that made Woollahra one of the most up-to-date municipalities in metropolitan Sydney.

He first entered New South Wales Parliament in 1925 when he was elected to the New South Wales Legislative Assembly as a Nationalist member for Eastern Suburbs. Following the re-introduction of single-member districts in 1927, he represented Vaucluse as a member of the United Australia Party.

Foster served as an executive member of the Employers' Federation, two Wages boards, the Soldiers Vocational Training committee, the Soldiers Settlement committee, the Technological Museum Advisory committee, and the Building Trades Rehabilitation committee.

=== Political views ===
Describing himself as an 'anti-socialist', Foster was a critic of socialism and a staunch defender of private enterprise. He viewed Adam Smith as the greatest economist the world had ever seen.

He was also an advocate of housing reform, and as chairman of various committees had frequently reported to the government in that capacity.

=== Transport policy ===
Foster strongly opposed Michael Bruxner's Transport Act of 1930, which regulated private bus services in order to protect the failing government-owned tramways and railways. The bill intended to prevent busses in Sydney from competing with trams by barring them from running alongside public tramways. According to the government, competition from busses in Sydney would "spoil a great public asset" by taking revenue away from the trams.

Foster's opinion was that it would be more sensible to leave transport to private enterprise, and that the government's proposal to eliminate competition from private busses was "socialistic". He said the policy was unfair to bus drivers and conductors in the city, whose "only crime was that they were giving service to the public and earning an honest living".

He called attention to the growing congestion on the government-owned tramways and noted that Sydney's public transportation system was failing to cope despite costing millions of pounds. At the time, annual losses from the New South Wales railways amounted to approximately £2,000,000. The railway lines were isolated, expensive, inadequate, and were described by the Cowra Guardian as "the outcome of a centralised government attempting more than is possible". Foster remarked that it took 25 years of agitation to get the government rail transport agency to put down the half-mile of line from Bondi to North Bondi, and that his constituents in Woollahara had been asking in vain for 25 years for a line connecting them with the central station. He said that private sector bus operators, meanwhile, had stepped up to provide Woollahara the route they wanted, and that they were successful in doing so because busses were less expensive to operate.

Foster pointed to Underground Electric Railways Company of London managing director Lord Ashfield as "the greatest authority in the world on metropolitan transport" and often quoted from Ashfield's reports in parliamentary debates, which he said show that "the bus is nearly five times more effective on capital expenditure than trams, and about six and a half times more than the underground." In Foster's view, busses were capable of coping with the whole of the Sydney's transport if not for the state's intervention.

Foster travelled abroad and studied the transport systems in many different countries. He said that taxis had completely revolutionised transport in Paris, and that successful transit services in London were being provided to the city by private enterprise. He noticed that tramways outside Manchester were being torn up and replaced with asphalt roads. Foster viewed the public tramway system as obsolete, preferring busses and clearly defined railways.

He was the only member to cross the bench to oppose the bill.

=== Independence from political party ===
Foster was as a member of the Nationalist party and its United Australia Party successor, both of which are forces of the centre-right Coalition alliance (known today as the "Liberal–National Coalition"). However, although he was a loyal supporter of the Coalition's Stevens-Bruxner government, he frequently displayed an independence of spirit and often engaged in vigorous debate with members of his own political party. He was acclaimed for his vehement criticism of his party's approach to transport policy, and for crossing the bench to vote against the government on the matter.

In response to another member of the Legislative Assembly suggesting that he should leave his party, Foster stated "I cannot leave the party, because I have no where else to go. I am in the party in order to try to purify it. I object to the steady drift towards socialism which is being manifested by the party to which I belong."

After his death, politician Eric Spooner said that Foster exercised an independence in Parliament which commanded the respect of every member of the Legislative Assembly.

=== Building industry advocacy ===
After leaving his position as president of the Master Builders' Association in 1918, Foster remained an active supporter of the association until his death. The Master Builders' Association passed a resolution to encourage its members to support his 1925 election to Parliament.

Using his position as a member of the Legislative Assembly, he assisted the association by arranging meetings with ministers and senior parliamentary members, and by making speeches in Parliament in support of the building industry. Foster was assisted by Thomas Henley and the Master Builders' Association to prepare a response to the Industrial Arbitration Bill of 1925.

Amid the growth in popularity of flats in the 1920s, some Sydney councils proposed bans or restrictions on their development, arguing that the new multi-story buildings were obstructing views from existing neighbouring homes. Foster objected to a total prohibition, instead suggesting that the Institute of Architects and Master Builders' Association should each nominate a technical representative to advise councils, in an honorary capacity, on flat design.

== Personal life ==
He married Ada Brees in 1893, with whom he had two sons. Ada was interested in charity and social reform, and was associated with the appeal for funding of the Eastern Suburbs Hospital in Queens Park, of which William Foster was later elected chairman.

Foster was a member of the Bourke Street Wesleyan Debating Society and vice president of the Centenary Hall Debating Society.

His son, Hugh Carlyle Foster, also became mayor of Woollahra in 1955.

== Death ==
On 21 July 1936, Foster died on the floor of the Legislative Assembly while he was criticising his own party's handling of metropolitan transport. In the midst of concluding a declamatory speech he suddenly stopped, lost the thread of his argument, became incoherent, collapsed on to his table, and died moments later.

Although it was clear that he was in physical pain in the moments leading up to his speech, Foster felt so intensely about the issue that he felt it his duty to continue. He had a glass of brandy placed to the table beside him and occasionally took sips from it to give himself the strength to continue.

I have been in this House for five Parliaments, and, at the moment, I am in great pain, suffering intensely, but I deem it my duty to speak upon this subject as long as my strength permits, until I present the facts. For 12 months I have been promised that this motion would be heard, but I have been sidestepped by those higher than me; those in authority in the Government. — William Frederick Foster, moments before his death

He had been speaking for 34 minutes when he collapsed at 11.22 pm. Immediately following his collapse, Acting-Premier Michael Bruxner rushed to his side while other members jumped to their feet in shock. Within a minute, politician and medical doctor James Webb attempted to render aid, but was unable to revive him. The house was then adjourned until the following week.

The event was observed as one of the most sensational and tragic scenes ever witnessed in the Parliament of New South Wales. According to The Sun, Foster was the only person to drop dead in the chamber.

He was buried at Waverley Cemetery. On 23 July, members of Parliament left Parliament House to attend his funeral. The manager of a private taxi business offered dozens of taxi-cabs free of charge for his funeral procession as a mark of respect for Foster being "always prepared to take up with the government any just and reasonable claim put forward".

== Legacy ==
Foster Park and Foster Avenue, both in Double Bay, were posthumously named after Foster in 1937.

New South Wales Legislative Assembly
Preceded by Cyril Fallon; Hyman Goldstein; Charles Oakes	Member for Eastern Suburbs; 1925–1927; Served alongside: Alldis, Jaques, O'Halloran, Preston-Stanley	Succeeded by Seat abolished
Preceded by New seat	Member for Vaucluse; 1927–1936	Succeeded by Murray Robson
