= Cyril Fallon =

Australian politician (1887 – 1948)

Cyril Joseph Fallon (1887 – 20 April 1948) was an Australian politician.

He was born in Surry Hills to tailor John Fallon and Katherine, née Macken. Educated at St Joseph's College and the University of Sydney (BA 1908, MB 1913), he became a medical practitioner in Randwick, and also lectured in classics. In 1916, he married Mildred Mary Hunt, with whom he had five children. He spent three years as a medical examiner for the Department of Education, and was a member of the Australian Industrial Christian Fellowship Council in 1923.

In 1922, he was elected to the New South Wales Legislative Assembly as one of the members for Eastern Suburbs, representing the sectarian Catholic Democratic Party. By 1925, the party had collapsed and Fallon contested the election as an "Independent Catholic", but was defeated. He died at Darlinghurst in 1948.

New South Wales Legislative Assembly
Preceded by Daniel Dwyer; James Macarthur-Onslow	Member for Eastern Suburbs; 1922–1925; Served alongside: Goldstein, Jaques, Oakes, O'Halloran	Succeeded by Septimus Alldis; William Foster; Millicent Preston-Stanley
