= Electoral district of Wammerawa =

Election results for Wammerawa, New South Wales, Australia

Wammerawa was an electoral district for the Legislative Assembly in the Australian State of New South Wales, created in 1920, with the introduction of proportional representation and named after an alternative name for the Macquarie River. It mainly replaced Mudgee, Castlereagh and Liverpool Plains and elected three members simultaneously. In 1927, it was split into Mudgee, Castlereagh and Liverpool Plains.

== Members for Wammerawa ==
Member	Party	Term	Member	Party	Term	Member	Party	Term
Bill Dunn	Labor	1920–1927	Joseph Clark	Labor	1920–1922	William Ashford	Nationalist	1920–1922
Bill Dunn	Labor	1920–1927	Harold Thorby	Progressive	1922–1927	William Ashford	Independent	1922
Bill Dunn	Labor	1920–1927	Harold Thorby	Progressive	1922–1927	Joseph Clark	Labor	1922–1927

== Election results ==
1925 New South Wales state election: Wammerawa
Party	Candidate	Votes	%	±%
Quota		6,717		
Labor	Bill Dunn (elected 1)	8,680	32.3	+6.2
Labor	Joseph Clark (elected 2)	5,078	18.9	+0.6
Labor	John Ritchie	1,352	5.0	+5.0
Progressive	Harold Thorby (elected 3)	4,664	17.4	+6.5
Progressive	Alfred Yeo	788	2.9	+2.9
Progressive	Samuel Armstrong	721	2.7	+2.7
Nationalist	Harold Blackett	3,367	12.5	+12.5
Nationalist	John Macdonald	1,566	5.8	+0.8
Nationalist	Henry Buttsworth	650	2.4	+2.4
Total formal votes		26,866	97.0	+0.7
Informal votes		823	3.0	−0.7
Turnout		27,689	72.9	+1.6
Party total votes
Labor		15,110	56.2	+8.7
Progressive		6,173	23.0	−6.2
Nationalist		5,583	20.8	+8.6
