= Hyman Goldstein (politician) =

Australian politician

The Honourable Hyman Goldstein

Member of the New South Wales Legislative Assembly for Eastern Suburbs
- In office 1922–1925

Member of the New South Wales Legislative Assembly for Coogee
- In office 1927 – 3 September 1928
- Preceded by: office established
- Succeeded by: John Dunningham

32nd Mayor of Randwick
- In office 1918–1919

Personal details
- Born: 1876 London, England
- Died: 3 September 1928 (aged 51–52) Coogee, New South Wales, Australia
- Cause of death: Fall (suspected homicide)
- Occupation: Politician
- Known for: Suspected murder victim of Thomas Ley

Hyman Goldstein (1876 – 3 September 1928) was an Australian politician. He was a Nationalist member of the New South Wales Legislative Assembly, representing Eastern Suburbs from 1922 until 1925, and Coogee from 1927 to his death in 1928. Federal Nationalist MP Thomas Ley, an enemy of Goldstein's who was later convicted of murder in England, is often held responsible for his death.

== Background ==
Goldstein was born in London, to tailor Solomon Goldstein and his wife Hannah, formerly Cohen. Arriving in Australia in 1888, he was educated at Crown Street Public School, before becoming a businessman. He married Olive Hopkins, with whom he had two sons, in 1903.

== Political career ==
Goldstein served as the 32nd Mayor of Randwick from 1918 to 1919.

In 1922, he was elected as one of the five members for Eastern Suburbs in the New South Wales Legislative Assembly, but he was defeated at the state election three years later. He returned to Parliament as the member for Coogee after the end of proportional representation in 1927.

== Death ==
Goldstein was a shareholder in the Prickly Pear Company, which had been organised by former New South Wales Justice Minister and federal MP Thomas Ley. The company's failure had been preceded by Ley selling all of his shares. Goldstein, one of many shareholders who had lost their investments when the company collapsed, began a campaign against Ley but was subsequently found dead after a fall from the Coogee cliffs. Although it was ruled a case of accidental death, there are grounds for believing that he had been killed at Ley's behest; by this time Ley was already suspected of having done away with his federal predecessor Frederick McDonald (who disappeared in 1926) and with Keith Greedor, a business associate who had drowned in 1928 after having launched an investigation into Ley's business practices. The Goldstein Reserve at Coogee Beach is named after him.

== See also ==
- List of unsolved murders (1900–1979)

Civic offices
Preceded by John Fenton	Mayor of Randwick; 1918 – 1919	Succeeded by George James Baker
New South Wales Legislative Assembly
Preceded by James Macarthur-Onslow; Daniel Dwyer	Member for Eastern Suburbs; 1922–1925; Served alongside: Oakes, Jaques, Fallon, O'Halloran	Succeeded by William Foster; Millicent Preston-Stanley; Septimus Alldis
Preceded by New seat	Member for Coogee; 1927–1928	Succeeded by John Dunningham
