= James Macarthur-Onslow =

Australian Army officer and politician (1867–1946)

Major General James Macarthur-Onslow VD
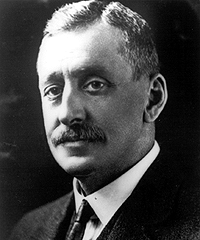
- James MacArthur-Onslow c. 1930

Member of the New South Wales Legislative Council
- In office 4 July 1922 – 22 April 1934

Member of the New South Wales Legislative Assembly for Eastern Suburbs
- In office 20 March 1920 – 17 February 1922
- Preceded by: New seat
- Succeeded by: Hyman Goldstein

Member of the New South Wales Legislative Assembly for Bondi
- In office 6 December 1913 – 18 February 1920
- Preceded by: New seat
- Succeeded by: Seat abolished

Member of the New South Wales Legislative Assembly for Waverley
- In office 10 September 1907 – 6 November 1913
- Preceded by: Thomas Jessep
- Succeeded by: James Fingleton

Personal details
- Born: 7 November 1867 Camden Park Estate, New South Wales
- Died: 17 November 1946 (aged 79) Camden Park Estate, New South Wales
- Party: Liberal Reform Party (1910–17); Nationalist Party (1917–20); Progressive Party (1920–31); United Australia Party (1931–34)
- Spouse: Enid Emma Macarthur (m. 1897)
- Parent: Arthur Onslow (father)
- Education: Trinity College, Cambridge

Military service
- Allegiance: Colony of New South Wales; Australia
- Branch/service: New South Wales Military Forces (1892–01); Citizens Military Force (1901–25)
- Years of service: 1892–1925
- Rank: Major General
- Commands: 1st Light Horse Brigade (1907–10); 2nd Light Horse Regiment (1903–07); 5th Battalion, Australian Commonwealth Horse (1902)
- Battles/wars: Chitral Expedition; Second Boer War; First World War
- Awards: Colonial Auxiliary Forces Officers' Decoration; Mentioned in Despatches

Major General James William Macarthur-Onslow, VD (7 November 1867 – 17 November 1946) was a soldier, grazier and politician. The son of a prominent New South Wales family, he was commissioned in the New South Wales Mounted Rifles in 1892 and served in the Chitral Expedition, Second Boer War and the First World War. Afterwards, he served in the New South Wales Legislative Assembly and New South Wales Legislative Council.

== Early life ==
James William Macarthur-Onslow was born on 7 November 1867 at Camden Park Estate, near Menangle, New South Wales, the son of Captain Arthur Alexander Walton Onslow and his wife Elizabeth née Macarthur, the granddaughter of wool pioneer John Macarthur. He was educated at Sydney Grammar School. After his father died in 1882 his mother Elizabeth changed her name to Macarthur-Onslow, and in 1887 she took her children to the United Kingdom to complete their education while she studied dairy farming.

Macarthur-Onslow read law at Trinity College, Cambridge, receiving Bachelor of Arts (BA) and Bachelor of Laws (LLB) degrees in 1890. He returned to Australia in 1891. He married Enid Emma Macarthur, the granddaughter of Hannibal Hawkins Macarthur in 1897. – James' great-grandfather and Enid's great-grandfather were brothers.

== Military career ==
Macarthur-Onslow was commissioned captain of the Camden Squadron of the New South Wales Mounted Rifles in 1892. In 1894 he was selected by commandant of the military forces in New South Wales, Colonel Edward Hutton, for training in India with the 11th Hussars, the Royal Artillery, and the 1st Battalion, King's Royal Rifle Corps of the British Army. He served in India from 1894 to 1895, seeing active service in the Chitral Expedition.

In 1900 Macarthur-Onslow made his own way to South Africa in 1900 to participate in the Second Boer War, where he served as aide-de-camp to Hutton, who was now a major general. He participated in operations in the Orange Free State from February to May 1900, including the actions at Vet River and Zand River, and operations in the Transvaal from May to November 1900. For this service, he was mentioned in despatches by Field Marshal Lord Roberts. He returned to Australia in March 1901, but was later appointed to command the 5th Battalion, Australian Commonwealth Horse.

Macarthur-Onslow served as aide-de-camp to the Governor-General of Australia, the Earl of Hopetoun in 1902. He commanded the 2nd Light Horse Regiment from July 1903 until December 1907 when he was promoted to colonel on assuming command of the 1st Light Horse Brigade. He was on the unattached list in January 1910. Although too old for active service during the First World War, Macarthur-Onslow held the rank of colonel with the Sea Transport Service of the Australian Imperial Force, commanding troop ships travelling between Australia, the Middle East and Britain between 1915 and 1917. He was aide-de-camp to the Governor-General a second time from 1917 to 1920. He retired with the rank of major general in 1925.

== Political career ==
Macarthur-Onslow served the people of New South Wales as a member of the New South Wales Legislative Assembly, representing the seats of Waverley from 1907 to 1913, Bondi from 1913 to 1920, and Eastern Suburbs from 1920 to 1922. He was nominated to the New South Wales Legislative Council in 1922, then a lifetime appointment, and served there until 1933, but was largely inactive.

== Later life ==
Macarthur-Onslow served as a director of the Commercial Banking Company of Sydney Limited and The Colonial Sugar Refining Company Limited. His other appointments included president of the Australian Club and director of the Royal Prince Alfred Hospital 1909 until 1929.

Macarthur-Onslow died at Camden Park and was survived by his wife, his son and his two daughters. His papers are in the Mitchell Library, State Library of New South Wales.

== Family tree ==
- Arthur Pooley Onslow m. Rosa Roberta, née Macleay (m. 1832)
  - Captain Arthur Alexander Walton Onslow (1833–1882) m. Elizabeth, née Macarthur (1840–1911); changed her name to Macarthur-Onslow in 1892
    - James William Macarthur-Onslow (1867–1946) m. Enid Emma, née Macarthur
    - James Arthur Macarthur-Onslow (1898–1959) m. Constance, née Herbert; disinherited and bankrupted by his father
    - Helen Maud Macarthur-Onslow (1899–1968) m. Major General Sir Reginald Stanham; inherited Camden Park Estate
      - Brigadier Richard Quentin Macarthur-Stanham; inherited Camden Park Estate
    - Elizabeth Enid Macarthur-Onslow (1903–1990) m. Frederick Rothe
    - William Macarthur-Onslow; died in WWI
    - Emily Susan Macarthur-Onslow (1869–1876)
    - Rosa Sibella Macarthur-Onslow (1871–1943)
    - Brigadier General George Macleay Macarthur-Onslow (1875–1931) m. Violet Marguerite, née Gordon (m. 16 October 1909 at Manar, near Braidwood)
    - (Francis) Arthur Macarthur-Onslow (1879–1938) m. Sylvia Seton Raymond, née Chisholm (m. 16 May 1903 at Goulburn)
      - Major General Sir Denzil Macarthur-Onslow (1904–1984) m. Elinor Margaret, née Caldwell (m. 1927; div. c. 1945)
        - Ion Macarthur—Onslow
        - Neil Macarthur—Onslow
        - Diana Macarthur—Onslow
        - Ewan Macarthur—Onslow
      - Major General Sir Denzil Macarthur—Onslow (1904–1984) m. Dorothy Wolseley Conagher, née Scott (c. 1923–2013); (m. 1950 in Petersham)
        - Katrina Macarthur—Onslow m. Sir Charles Hobhouse
        - Lee Macarthur—Onslow (1952–2021)
  - Sir Alexander Campbell Onslow (1842–1908)

== Notes ==
New South Wales Legislative Assembly
Preceded by Thomas Jessep	Member for Waverley; 1907–1913	Succeeded by James Fingleton
New district	Member for Bondi; 1913–1920	District abolished
New district	Member for Eastern Suburbs; 1920–1922; Served alongside: Fingleton/Dwyer, Jaques, Oakes, O'Halloran	Succeeded by Hyman Goldstein
