= Democratic Party (1920) =

Former Australian political party

The Democratic Party was a minor Australian political party that operated in New South Wales in the early 1920s. It represented the Roman Catholic minority, and was formed by Patrick Cleary, leader of the New South Wales Catholic Federation. The party contested the 1920 state election unsuccessfully, but in 1922 had its only ever electoral success, with Cyril Fallon being elected as one of the five members for Eastern Suburbs. Although generally supporting Labor, Fallon acted as a virtual independent and the party soon dissolved; Fallon stood as an Independent Catholic in 1925.

It was not related to the Democratic Party, a conservative party that contested the 1944 state election.
