= Harold Jaques =

Australian politician

Harold Vivian Jaques (29 January 1882 – 27 September 1952) was an Australian politician.

== Early life and education ==
He was born at Petersham in Sydney to solicitor Alfred Edmund Jaques and Catherine Harriett, née Sutton. He attended Abbey School at Beckenham in Kent before returning to Australia, first to Bowral then to Sydney Church of England Grammar School, and finally to the University of Sydney, receiving a Bachelor of Arts in 1904 and a Bachelor of Law in 1906.

== Career ==
Jaques was called to the Bar in 1907 and spent three years as an associate to High Court Justice Sir Edmund Barton.

In 1912, he served as chairman of the Coal and Shale Mining (West) Wages Board, and during World War I served in the Royal Field Artillery. Attaining the rank of second lieutenant, he was severely wounded in action and had a leg amputated.

In 1920, he was elected to the New South Wales Legislative Assembly as a Nationalist member for Eastern Suburbs. With the reintroduction of single-member districts, he was elected as the member for Bondi, one of two Nationalist candidates — the other being Millicent Preston-Stanley, but he was defeated in 1930.

After leaving politics, Jaques returned to the Bar and worked primarily in workers' compensation. Unmarried, he died in Sydney in 1952.

New South Wales Legislative Assembly
New district	Member for Eastern Suburbs; 1920–1927; With: Fingleton/Dwyer/Fallon/Alldis; Macarthur-Onslow/Goldstein/Foster; Oakes/Preston-Stanley; O'Halloran	District abolished
New district	Member for Bondi; 1927–1930	Succeeded by Abe Landa
