= Bob O'Halloran =

Australian politician

Member of the New South Wales Legislative Assembly
- In office 10 May 1941 – 29 March 1947
- Preceded by: Alwyn Tonking
- Succeeded by: Sir Charles Cutler
- Constituency: Orange
- In office 20 March 1920 – 7 September 1927
- Preceded by: New seat
- Succeeded by: Abolished
- Constituency: Eastern Suburbs

Personal details
- Born: 6 June 1888 Euchareena, New South Wales
- Died: 1 December 1974 (aged 86) Glenbrook, New South Wales
- Party: Labor Party
- Spouse: Irene Alice Sheridan
- Children: 3 daughters, 2 sons
- Parents: Michael Conlon O'Halloran (father); Rose O'Halloran née Sloane (mother)
- Occupation: Public servant

Robert Emmet O'Halloran (6 June 1888 – 1 December 1974) was an Australian politician. He was a Labor Party Member of the New South Wales Legislative Assembly spanning 27 years, representing Eastern Suburbs between 1920 and 1927 and Orange between 1941 and 1947.

== Early years ==
O'Halloran was born in Euchareena, New South Wales to Rose née Sloane and Michael Conlon O'Halloran, a newspaper proprietor, who was involved in the early history of the Labor Party. He was educated at Christian Brothers' College, Waverley, Saint Ignatius' College, Riverview; and studied law at The University of Sydney from 1908 to 1909. He entered the New South Wales public service; eventually rising to become head of the Deceased Soldiers' Estate Department, Public Trustee's office on election to Parliament. He was a director of Royal Prince Alfred Hospital in 1931, Dental Hospital; president of Government employees' section clerks' Union; trustee of Sydney Cricket Ground.

== New South Wales state political career ==
In the 1927 split that divided the Labor Party, O'Halloran (Caucus Secretary at the time), sided with the McKell faction against Premier Jack Lang. O'Halloran subsequently lost endorsement for this move and was not pre-selected for the newly formed seats of Bondi, Coogee, Randwick, Vaucluse, Waverley and Woollahra. He remained on the outer until Lang's power waned. McKell, President of the Sydney Cricket Ground Trust, kept O'Halloran in his fold by appointing him as a fellow Trustee.

In 1944, it was reported that O'Halloran, a resident of Chandos Street in Ashfield, was fined £10 in the Central Police Court of Sydney for having driven a motor car while under the influence of liquor. In his defence, O'Halloran claimed he was under severe mental stress at the time, because of family bereavements. He admitted that his condition might have been aggravated by his distraught state. O'Halloran, who pleaded guilty, submitted that there were extenuating circumstances. O'Halloran's younger sister had been buried that day and a few weeks earlier he had lost his eldest daughter. His son had contracted meningitis whilst returning from New Guinea. He submitted that loss of his driver's licence would be a great hardship because he used his car as an agent and as a Member of Parliament. The Magistrate, in fining O'Halloran, said he was not prepared to extend the benefit of hardship, meaning that the licence is automatically cancelled for twelve months.

O'Halloran died at Glenbrook, survived by his wife, two daughters and two sons.

New South Wales Legislative Assembly
New district	Member for Eastern Suburbs; 1920 – 1927; With: Jaques; Oakes / Preston-Stanley; Fingleton / Dwyer / Fallon / Alldis; Macarthur-Onslow / Goldstein / Foster	District abolished
Preceded by Alwyn Tonking	Member for Orange; 1941 – 1947	Succeeded by Sir Charles Cutler
