= Septimus Alldis =

Australian politician (1886–1929)

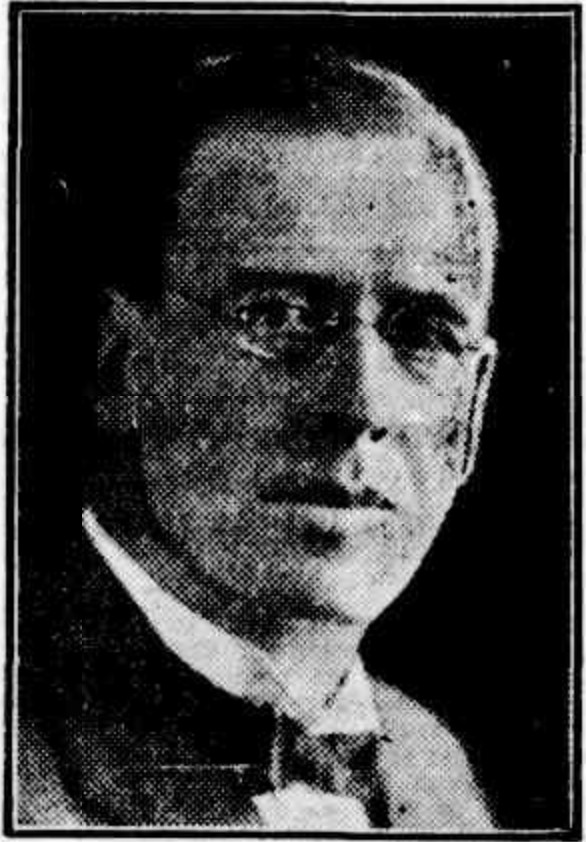
Septimus Denbigh Alldis

Septimus Denbigh Alldis (5 February 1886 – 22 July 1929) was an Australian politician.

He was born at Gong Gong to James Ford Walter Alldis and Sarah, née Jones. On 22 March 1913 he married Maggie Hamilton Thomson. A schoolteacher, he taught in Orange from 1901 and also studied at the University of Sydney, receiving his Bachelor of Arts in 1922. He taught at Cleveland Street Intermediate High School from 1919 to 1925 and later taught classics at Burwood High School. In 1925 he was elected to the New South Wales Legislative Assembly as a Labor member for Eastern Suburbs. When single-member districts were reintroduced, he contested Labor preselection for Woollahra and lost; he ran as an Independent Labor candidate and was defeated. He returned to teaching, primarily classics, after his defeat and wrote several Latin textbooks. Alldis died in 1929 at Sydney.

New South Wales Legislative Assembly
Preceded by Cyril Fallon; Hyman Goldstein	Member for Eastern Suburbs; 1925–1927; Served alongside: Foster, Jaques, O'Halloran, Preston-Stanley	Succeeded by Seat abolished
