= Electoral district of Eastern Suburbs (New South Wales) =

Former state electoral district of New South Wales, Australia

Eastern Suburbs was an electoral district of the Legislative Assembly in the Australian state of New South Wales. It was created as a five-member electorate with the introduction of proportional representation in 1920, replacing Bondi, Randwick, Waverley and Woollahra and named after and situated in Sydney's Eastern Suburbs. It was abolished in 1927 and replaced by Bondi, Coogee, Randwick, Vaucluse, Waverley and Woollahra.

== Members for Eastern Suburbs ==
Member	Party	Term	Member	Party	Term	Member	Party	Term	Member	Party	Term	Member	Party	Term
James Macarthur-Onslow	Progressive	1920–1922	Charles Oakes	Nationalist	1920–1925	Harold Jaques	Nationalist	1920–1927	James Fingleton	Labor	1920–1920	Bob O'Halloran	Labor	1920–1927
James Macarthur-Onslow	Progressive	1920–1922	Charles Oakes	Nationalist	1920–1925	Harold Jaques	Nationalist	1920–1927	Daniel Dwyer	Labor	1920–1922	Bob O'Halloran	Labor	1920–1927
Hyman Goldstein	Nationalist	1922–1925	Charles Oakes	Nationalist	1920–1925	Harold Jaques	Nationalist	1920–1927	Cyril Fallon	Democratic	1922–1925	Bob O'Halloran	Labor	1920–1927
William Foster	Nationalist	1925–1927	Millicent Preston-Stanley	Nationalist	1925–1927	Harold Jaques	Nationalist	1920–1927	Septimus Alldis	Labor	1925–1927	Bob O'Halloran	Labor	1920–1927

== Election results ==
1925 New South Wales state election: Eastern Suburbs
Party	Candidate	Votes	%	±%
Quota		9,010		
Nationalist	Millicent Preston-Stanley (elected 5)	7,958	14.7	+6.9
Nationalist	William Foster (elected 4)	7,331	13.6	+8.5
Nationalist	Harold Jaques (elected 3)	7,324	13.6	+2.2
Nationalist	Hyman Goldstein	6,913	12.8	+2.8
Nationalist	Joseph Robinson	547	1.0	+1.0
Nationalist	George Overhill	543	1.0	+1.0
Labor	Bob O'Halloran (elected 1)	8,499	15.7	+4.1
Labor	Septimus Alldis (elected 2)	4,121	7.6	+7.6
Labor	William Crick	1,132	2.1	+2.1
Labor	Gertrude Melville	1,057	2.0	+2.0
Labor	Gordon Anderson	938	1.7	+1.7
Independent	Cyril Fallon (defeated)	5,996	11.1	+0.2
Protestant Labour	James Gillespie	1,489	2.8	+2.8
Independent	David Anderson	128	0.2	+0.2
Independent	Frederick Marks	82	0.2	+0.2
Total formal votes		54,058	96.7	−0.3
Informal votes		1,845	3.3	+0.3
Turnout		55,903	65.4	−3.7
Party total votes
Nationalist		30,616	56.6	+2.2
Labor		15,747	29.1	+10.4
Independent	Cyril Fallon	5,996	11.1	+0.2
Protestant Labour		1,489	2.8	+2.8
Independent	David Anderson	128	0.2	+0.2
Independent	Frederick Marks	82	0.2	+0.2
