= Millicent Preston-Stanley =

Australian politician (1883–1955)

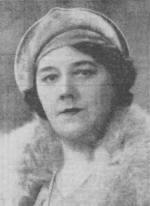
- Millicent Fanny Preston Stanley

Member of the New South Wales Parliament for Eastern Suburbs
- In office 1925–1927
- Preceded by: Charles Oakes
- Succeeded by: Constituency abolished

Personal details
- Born: 9 September 1883; Sydney, Australia
- Died: 23 June 1955 (aged 71)
- Political party: Nationalist
- Occupation: Politician

Millicent Preston-Stanley (9 September 1883 – 23 June 1955) was an Australian feminist and politician who served as the first female member of the New South Wales Legislative Assembly. In 1925, she became the second woman to enter government in Australia. (Note: Edith Cowan entered the Legislative Assembly of Western Australia in 1921; May Holman entered the Legislative Assembly of Western Australia on 3 April 1925 two months before Millicent Preston-Stanley was elected, but on the Opposition benches.) She was also among the first women in New South Wales to become Justices of the Peace and served as president of the Women Justices Association of New South Wales from 1923 to 1926. Throughout her life, Preston-Stanley advocated for women's rights, health reform, and temperance.

== Personal life ==
Millicent Fanny Stanley was born in Sydney (Note: An assertion by Mary Liddell that Stanley was born in Melbourne was never contradicted. She also said her father died when she was young. It is likely he was the Augustine Gregory Stanley who fell foul of the law in Kalgoorlie, Western Australia, in 1906.) in 1883. She was the daughter of Augustine Gregory Stanley, a grocer, and his wife Fanny Ellen Stanley (née Preston) (c. 1859 – 9 September 1934). After her father deserted the family, her mother obtained a divorce and adopted the surname "Preston-Stanley" for herself and her daughter.

She had at least one brother, Victor Charles Preston-Stanley (died 26 June 1919), who was the father of Major Preston-Stanley, and of Betty Preston-Stanley who married Major John Gray, and Joan Preston-Stanley.

Preston-Stanley married Crawford Vaughan, former Premier of South Australia, in 1934. She died on 23 June 1955 in the Sydney suburb of Randwick from cerebrovascular disease.

== Political career ==
By 1906 Preston Stanley was a council member of the N.S.W. Women's Liberal League, when its president/secretary was Mrs Molyneux Parkes.

Her bid in 1922 for one of the four multi-member Eastern Suburbs seats on the New South Wales Legislative Assembly failed (having been placed fifth on the Coalition ticket), but in May 1925 she was successful, winning the seat for the Nationalist Party, one of the historic predecessors of today's Liberal Party.

She campaigned for reductions in maternal mortality, reform in child welfare, amendments to the Health Act, and better housing. She delivered her inaugural address to the Legislative Assembly of the New South Wales Parliament on 26 August 1925, using the opportunity to address those of her colleagues who did not believe that women had a role in politics. She said:

Some hon. members have been kind enough to suggest that women should be protected from the hurly-burly of politics. This attitude of mind may do credit to the softness of their hearts, and I think it may also be taken as prima facie evidence of a little softening in their heads. … I believe that women's questions are national questions, and that national questions are women's questions, and it may be shown that woman can take her place amongst the representatives of the people in the Parliament of the country and play her part in the political life of the nation.

In addition, her inaugural address argued against reducing the 48 hour workweek to 44 hours, arguing that the Labor Party should first shorten the average woman's workweek, which she claimed was 112 hours.

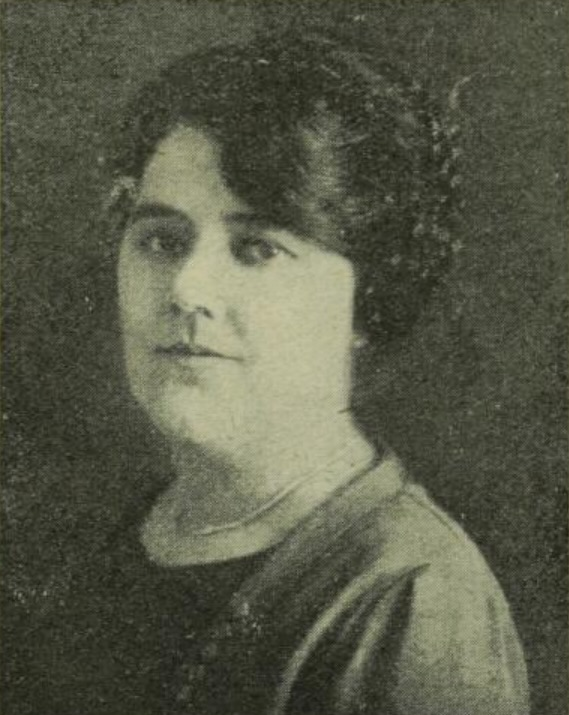
Millicent Preston-Stanley in 1925

In parliament she campaigned on the issues of women's mortality in childbirth, child welfare, institutional care for the mentally ill, and custody rights in divorce. She personally took up the cause of actress Emélie Polini, whose ex-husband and his mother had custody of their daughter Patricia. In 1924 Emélie sued for the right to take her daughter on a trip to London after they refused her permission. This was denied by Mr Justice Harvey. Though her private member's bill on equal custody rights failed she continued the campaign. She wrote a play Whose Child? based on this case. She also lobbied for family planning and sex education, a focus on maternal and child health, and for a chair of obstetrics at the medical school, sarcastically calling for "'Horses' rights for women" after the University of Sydney instead established a course in veterinary obstetrics.

Preston-Stanley had her detractors: Theo. H. Hill, while conceding her power as an orator, criticised her work ethic — she received £875 per year as a legislator, yet seldom attended sittings. He used her record to support his opposition to appointment of women to the Upper House. The Eastern Suburbs seat was abolished in 1927 and in the fresh elections both Preston-Stanley and H. V. Jaques stood as Nationalist candidates for the single-member seat of Bondi, and Jaques was successful. That was her last attempt at parliamentary honours.

Preston-Stanley was actively involved in women's groups such as the Women's Liberal League. She re-formed the Feminist Club of New South Wales and served as its president from 1920 to 1928 when Ada S. Holman was elected to the position. and from 1952 until her death in 1955. The club was amongst the organisations that successfully lobbied for the introduction of the Women's Legal Status Act 1918, which allowed women to run for office in the Lower House and local government, and to become Justices of the Peace. She was, in 1921, one of the first women in New South Wales to be appointed a Justice of the Peace, and was President of the Women's Justices' Association from 1923 to 1926.

Around 1929 the Feminist Club was in discussion with the Women's League of N.S.W. and the Women Voters' Association to form a unified lobby group, but the Feminist Club, which had developed into a private club for professional women, voted against joining the United Associations, resulting in the resignation of numerous members, including the president, Jessie Street.

A fervent supporter of the United Australia Party (UAP) — a precursor to the Liberal Party — Millicent Preston-Stanley brought the Feminist Club to prominence in the 1930s. Under her leadership the club stood apart from many other women's organisations that existed in the period in that the latter — like the Australian Women's Guild of Empire — concerned themselves with matters revolving around home keeping, family, and religiosity. Their purpose was primarily evangelical, and social, helping to cultivate resources and gatherings for women to attend and exchange information and skills in craftwork like sewing, knitting and so forth. It was precisely the entrenched notion that politics did not form part of "women's concerns" that the feminist movement of the 1930s sought to dislodge, and it was this apolitical focus that distinguished the women's organisations of the period from the Feminist Club of New South Wales. The Feminist Club's objective was "to secure equality of liberty, status and opportunity in all spheres between men and women.’

In 1947 she founded the Australian Women's Movement Against Socialisation in response to the establishment of a national bank by Chifley's Labor Party.

== Works ==
- Whose Child?, a play by M. Preston-Stanley, produced by George D. Parker at the Criterion Theatre on 26 November 1932, and based on the Emelie Polini case. Actors included Nancye Stewart and Miss Preston-Stanley herself.
- Husbands on Parade 1935 (musical)
- The Madonna of Mean Street 1936
- (with Crawford) The Call of the Magpie 1936
- Australia Marches On 1938 radio talks on 2GB
- (with Richard Hans Forst) The Little Brown House (musical) 1940

== Recognition ==
- A portrait of Preston-Stanley by Reginald Jerrold-Nathan hangs in Parliament House, Sydney
- A portrait by Mary Edwards hangs in the Dixson Library, Sydney

== Notes ==
New South Wales Legislative Assembly
Preceded by Charles Oakes	Member for Eastern Suburbs; 1925 – 1927; With: Foster, Jaques, Alldis, O'Halloran	District abolished
