= Progressive Party (1920) =

Political party in New South Wales

Progressive Party of New South Wales
- Founded: 1920
- Dissolved: 1927
- Succeeded by: Country Party (NSW branch)

The Progressive Party of New South Wales was a New South Wales political party that operated between 1920 and 1927, achieving representation in the Legislative Assembly due to proportional representation. It was not a direct successor to the earlier Progressive Party that had operated in the state between 1901 and 1907, but did include members of the former party including George Briner and Walter Bennett.

The party attracted support from conservative voters in both rural and urban NSW. As a result, its policies were socially conservative but had elements of agrarian socialism. At the 1920 election it won 15 seats.

In December 1921, the party split over the question of support for the first government of Nationalist Party politician George Fuller. An urban wing, led by Thomas Ley and Walter Wearne, agreed to enter Fuller's coalition, but a rural wing ("The True Blues"), led by Michael Bruxner and Ernest Buttenshaw, offered Fuller only conditional support. The urban members of the party were absorbed into the Nationalist Party at that time. The Progressive Party was reduced to nine rural members at the 1922 election and was a coalition partner in Fuller's second government.

The rural wing contested the 1925 election and maintained its nine seats, but in 1927, it reorganised as the NSW branch of the Country Party, of which the Progressive Party was essentially a fore-runner.

== 1921 split ==
This table provides the details of the 1921 split, covering members of the Legislative Assembly.

Coalitionists	"True Blues"
Thomas Bavin (Ryde); Walter Bennett (Maitland); Theodore Hill (Oxley); Thomas Ley (St George); James Macarthur-Onslow (Eastern Suburbs); Stephen Perdriau (Byron); Walter Wearne (Namoi); James Wilson (Western Suburbs)	Michael Bruxner (Northern Tableland); Ernest Buttenshaw (Murrumbidgee); David Drummond (Northern Tableland); Matthew Kilpatrick (Murray); Hugh Main (Cootamundra); Richard Price (Oxley); Thomas Rutledge (Goulburn)
