= Candidates of the 1913 New South Wales state election =

This is a list of candidates for the 1913 New South Wales state election. The election was held on 6 December 1913.

== Retiring Members ==
- Note: Lachlan Labor MLA Andrew Kelly died on 3 September 1913, shortly before the parliament was dissolved.

=== Labor ===
- John McNeill MLA (Pyrmont)
- John Meehan MLA (Darling)

=== Liberal ===
- Fred Downes MLA (Camden)
- David Fell MLA (Lane Cove)
- George Hindmarsh MLA (Rous)
- William Taylor MLA (St George)

== Legislative Assembly ==
Sitting members are shown in bold text. Successful candidates are highlighted in the relevant colour.

Electorate	Held by	Labor candidate	Liberal / FSA candidate	Other candidates
Albury	Ind Liberal	**John Cusack**	Hermann Paech (FSA) (Note: Also endorsed by Liberal Reform.)	John McEachern (CP); **Gordon McLaurin** (Ind Lib)
Alexandria	Labor	**Simon Hickey**		James Dixon (Ind Lib); Joseph Warner (Ind)
Allowrie	Liberal	Charles Craig	**Mark Morton**	
Annandale	Liberal	**Arthur Griffith**	**Albert Bruntnell**	John Strachan (Ind)
Armidale	Liberal	John Eather	George Braund (Note: Also endorsed by Farmers and Settlers.)	
Ashburnham	Labor	**John Lynch**	Arthur Grimm (FSA)	
Ashfield	Liberal	Percy Evans	**William Robson**	Henry Johnson (Ind)
Balmain	Labor	**John Storey**	John McEachern	Patrick Brice (Aus Soc); Francis Lennon (Nat Prog)
Bathurst	Liberal	Ernest Durack	**John Miller** (FSA)	
Bega	Liberal	John Webster	**William Millard**	Frederick Bland (Ind); Hector McWilliam (Ind)
Belmore	Labor	**Patrick Minahan**	John Haynes	John English (Ind Lab); Forbes Logie (Ind)
Bingara	Labor	**George McDonald**	Robert Higgins (FSA)	Frank Cheesbrough (CP)
Bondi	Liberal	George Moxon	**James Macarthur-Onslow**	Frank Farnell (Ind Lib)
Botany	Labor	David Johnstone		**Fred Page** (Ind Lab)
Burrangong	Labor	**George Burgess**	Arthur Trethowan (FSA)	
Burwood	Liberal	William Hocking	**Thomas Henley**	
Byron	Liberal		**John Perry**	Robert Campbell (Ind); John Pearson (Ind); Peter Street (Ind Lib)
Camden	Liberal	Michael O'Halloran	**John Hunt**	William Watson (Ind Lib)
Camperdown	Labor	**Robert Stuart-Robertson**	William McMahon	
Canterbury	Labor	**Henry Peters**	John Draper	Ernest Dent (Ind Lib); Richard Messiter (Nat Prog)
Castlereagh	Labor	**John Treflé**	Harold Blackett (FSA)	
Cessnock	Labor	**William Kearsley**	Charles Cheesbrough	William North (Soc Lab)
Clarence	Liberal	Clem Johnson	**John McFarlane**	
Cobar	Labor	**Charles Fern**	Maxwell Pahlow	
Cootamundra	Labor	**William Holman**	Thomas Spring (FSA)	
Corowa	Liberal	William Tomkins	**Richard Ball** (FSA)	
Darling Harbour	Labor	**John Cochran**		Arthur Gloag (Ind); Frederick Riley (Aus Soc); Andrew Thomson (Ind Lab)
Darlinghurst	Liberal	Frank Foster	**Daniel Levy**	
Drummoyne	Liberal	John Mudie	George Richards	Henry Johnson (Ind); Henry McDicken (Nat Prog)
Dulwich Hill	Liberal	Arthur Jones	Tom Hoskins	Harrie McConnell (Ind); Evan Prosser (Nat Prog)
Durham	Liberal	William Walton	**William Brown** (FSA)	Walter Bennett (CP)
Enmore	Labor	David Hall	Gustav Bohrsmann	Wallace McKeon (Ind)
Glebe	Labor	**Tom Keegan**	Rudolph Bohrsmann	
Gloucester	Liberal	Albert Jones	**Richard Price** (FSA)	David Cowan (CP); Robert Malcolm (Ind)
Gordon	Liberal	Frederick Cowdroy	**Charles Wade**	
Gough	Liberal	Henry Colditz	**Follett Thomas** (FSA)	
Goulburn	Liberal	Chester Davies	**Augustus James**	
Granville	Liberal	Jack Lang	**John Nobbs**	
Gwydir	Labor	**George Jones**	John Crane (FSA)	
Hartley	Labor	**James Dooley**	James Charlton	
Hastings and Macleay	Independent		Robert Davidson (FSA)	**Henry Morton** (Ind)
Hawkesbury	Liberal	Frederick Webster	**Brinsley Hall**	Henry Wilson (Ind Lib)
Hurstville	Liberal	Sam Toombs	**Varney Parkes**	James Murray (Nat Prog)
Kahibah	Labor	**Alfred Edden**	William Ellis	Edgar de Lough (CP)
King	Labor	**James Morrish**	Henry Manning	John Roche (Aus Soc)
Lachlan	Labor	Thomas Brown	Arthur Manning (FSA)	Herbert Bowles (CP)
Leichhardt	Labor	**Campbell Carmichael**	Henry Brierley	John Kilburn (Aus Soc)
Lismore	Liberal	Roger Kearney	George Nesbitt (FSA)	
Liverpool Plains	Labor	**William Ashford**	George Higgins; Augustus Perrett (FSA)	
Lyndhurst	Liberal	Guy Arkins	**Thomas Waddell** (FSA)	
Macquarie	Labor	**Thomas Thrower**	Reginald Weaver (FSA)	
Maitland	Liberal	John Fletcher	**Charles Nicholson**	
Marrickville	Labor	**Thomas Crawford**	William Wallace	Samuel Davidson (Nat Prog)
Middle Harbour	Liberal	Ellison Quirk	**Richard Arthur**	James Bray (Ind); Henry Johnson (Ind)
Monaro	Labor	**Gus Miller**	Ernest Quodling	James Hart (Ind)
Mosman	Liberal	Edward Cohen	Percy Colquhoun	William Bray (Ind Lib); William Fell (Ind Lib)
Mudgee	Labor	**Bill Dunn**	Owen Gilbert	
Murray	Labor	**Robert Scobie**	Robert Gibson	
Murrumbidgee	Labor	**Patrick McGarry**	Charles Hawkins (FSA)	
Namoi	Labor	**George Black**	James Florance	
Newcastle	Labor	**Arthur Gardiner**	John Fegan	
Newtown	Labor	**Robert Hollis**	Percy Stevens	Luke Jones (Aus Soc)
Orange	Liberal	Frank Edwards	**John Fitzpatrick**	
Paddington	Labor	**John Osborne**	Reginald Harris	Charles Carter (Ind); James Jones (Ind)
Parramatta	Liberal	Frank Walford	**Tom Moxham**	Walter Jago (Ind Lib)
Petersham	Liberal		**John Cohen**	
Phillip	Labor	**Richard Meagher**	Eden George	
Raleigh	Ind Liberal	Theodore McLennan	Henry Boultwood	**George Briner** (CP)
Randwick	Ind Liberal	William Brown	**David Storey**	William Melville (Ind)
Redfern	Labor	**James McGowen**	George Howe	Henry Ostler (Soc Lab)
Rozelle	Labor	**James Mercer**	Alan Chavasse	
Ryde	Liberal	Murdock MacLeod	William Thompson	Charles Summerhayes (Nat Prog)
St George	Liberal	William Bagnall	**William Wood**	Henry Broe (Nat Prog)
St Leonards	Liberal	George Down	**Arthur Cocks**	Frederick Meyer (Ind); Peter Pollack (Ind)
Singleton	Liberal	Thomas Braye	**James Fallick**	Leslie Hewitt (CP)
Sturt	Labor	**John Cann**		
Surry Hills	Labor	**Henry Hoyle**		Ludwig Klausen (Soc Lab); William Walker (Ind)
Tamworth	Ind Liberal	John Lord	Frank Chaffey (FSA)	**Robert Levien** (Ind)
Tenterfield	Liberal		**Charles Lee**	
Upper Hunter	Liberal	George Cann	Mac Abbott (FSA)	**Henry Willis** (Ind Lib)
Wagga Wagga	Liberal	Walter Boston	John Fletcher	
Wallsend	Labor	**John Estell**	Thomas Collins	Joseph Charlton (Soc Lab)
Waverley	Liberal	James Fingleton	Harold Jaques	**George Beeby** (Nat Prog)
Wickham	Labor	**William Grahame**	Magnus Cromarty	
Willoughby	Liberal	Edward Larkin	Frederick Fleming	Arthur Carrington (Nat Prog); Edward Clark (Ind Lib); Sir William McMillan (Ind Lib)
Willyama	Labor	Jabez Wright		William Ferguson (Ind Lib); Walter Wright (Ind)
Wollondilly	Liberal	James Donaldson	**Frank Badgery**	Samuel Emmett (CP); Thomas Raw (Ind Lib)
Wollongong	Labor	**John Nicholson**	Florence Healey	Ernie Judd (Ind)
Woollahra	Liberal	Daniel Dwyer	**William Latimer**	Francis Cowling (Ind Lab); Philip Morton (Ind Lib)
Yass	Labor	**Greg McGirr**	Patrick Bourke (FSA)	**Robert Donaldson** (CP)

== See also ==
- Results of the 1913 New South Wales state election
- Members of the New South Wales Legislative Assembly, 1913–1917
