= Results of the 1913 New South Wales state election =

State election for New South Wales, Australia in December 1913

New South Wales state election, 6 December 1913 Legislative Assembly << 1910–1917 >>
Enrolled voters	1,037,999				
Votes cast	668,601		Turnout	68.24	0.81
Informal votes	15,751		Informal	2.30	+0.50
Summary of votes by party
Party	Primary votes	%	Swing	Seats	Change
Labor	311,747	46.63	−2.29	49	+3
Liberal Reform	219,525	32.83	+10.2	28	-9
Farmers and Settlers (Note: Members of Farmers and Settlers were also endorsed by Liberal Reform.)	79,374	11.87	+11.16	10	+10
Independent Liberal	16,324	2.44	−3.42	0	−6
Independent	15,223	2.28	+1.58	1	0
Country Party Association	10,472	1.57	+1.57	1	+1
Independent Labor	9,225	1.38	+0.59	1	+1
Others	6,711	1.01	+1.01	0	-
Total	668,601			90	

This is a list of electoral district results for the 1913 New South Wales state election.

If a candidate failed to achieve at least 50% of the vote in an electorate, a run-off election would take place in the following weeks. In this election, 12 electorates proceeded to second round elections, while 3 were uncontested.

== Election results ==
=== Albury ===
1913 New South Wales state election: Albury
Party	Candidate	Votes	%	±%
Labor	John Cusack	3,239	44.4	
Independent Liberal	Gordon McLaurin	2,116	29.0	
Farmers and Settlers	Hermann Paech (Note: Also endorsed by Liberal Reform.)	1,701	23.3	
Country Party Association	John McEachern	234	3.2	
Total formal votes		7,290	97.2	
Informal votes		211	2.8	
Turnout		7,501	69.9	
Second round result
Labor	John Cusack	3,970	52.6	
Independent Liberal	Gordon McLaurin	3,575	47.4	
Total formal votes		7,545	99.3	
Informal votes		53	0.7	
Turnout		7,598	70.8	
Labor gain from Independent Liberal				

=== Alexandria ===
1913 New South Wales state election: Alexandria
Party	Candidate	Votes	%	±%
Labor	Simon Hickey	3,785	70.0	
Independent Liberal	James Dixon	1,092	20.2	
Independent	Joseph Warner	529	9.8	
Total formal votes		5,406	97.2	
Informal votes		158	2.8	
Turnout		5,564	54.3	
Labor hold				

=== Allowrie ===
1913 New South Wales state election: Allowrie
Party	Candidate	Votes	%	±%
Liberal Reform	Mark Morton	4,981	61.9	
Labor	Charles Craig	3,069	38.1	
Total formal votes		8,050	98.0	
Informal votes		161	2.0	
Turnout		8,211	75.7	
Liberal Reform hold				

=== Annandale ===
1913 New South Wales state election: Annandale
Party	Candidate	Votes	%	±%
Labor	Arthur Griffith	4,741	54.0	
Liberal Reform	Albert Bruntnell	3,935	44.8	
Independent	John Strachan	101	1.2	
Total formal votes		8,777	98.2	
Informal votes		161	1.8	
Turnout		8,938	73.9	
Labor gain from Liberal Reform				

=== Armidale ===
1913 New South Wales state election: Armidale
Party	Candidate	Votes	%	±%
Liberal Reform	George Braund (Note: Also endorsed by Farmers and Settlers.)	3,939	55.9	
Labor	John Eather	3,112	44.1	
Total formal votes		7,051	97.4	
Informal votes		185	2.6	
Turnout		7,236	73.5	
Liberal Reform hold				

=== Ashburnham ===
1913 New South Wales state election: Ashburnham
Party	Candidate	Votes	%	±%
Farmers and Settlers	Arthur Grimm	3,999	50.3	
Labor	John Lynch	3,954	49.7	
Total formal votes		7,953	97.5	
Informal votes		205	2.5	
Turnout		8,158	77.5	
Farmers and Settlers gain from Labor				

=== Ashfield ===
1913 New South Wales state election: Ashfield
Party	Candidate	Votes	%	±%
Liberal Reform	William Robson	5,954	70.5	
Labor	Percy Evans	2,251	26.7	
Independent	Henry Johnson	242	2.9	
Total formal votes		8,447	97.3	
Informal votes		231	2.7	
Turnout		8,678	64.7	
Liberal Reform hold				

=== Balmain ===
1913 New South Wales state election: Balmain
Party	Candidate	Votes	%	±%
Labor	John Storey	4,362	58.0	
Liberal Reform	John McEachern	2,248	29.9	
National Progressive	Francis Lennon	721	9.6	
Australasian Socialist	Patrick Brice	192	2.6	
Total formal votes		7,523	98.8	
Informal votes		93	1.2	
Turnout		7,616	66.2	
Labor hold				

=== Bathurst ===
1913 New South Wales state election: Bathurst
Party	Candidate	Votes	%	±%
Labor	Ernest Durack	3,678	50.2	
Farmers and Settlers	John Miller	3,645	49.8	
Total formal votes		7,323	97.0	
Informal votes		228	3.0	
Turnout		7,551	75.8	
Labor gain from Liberal Reform				

=== Bega ===
1913 New South Wales state election: Bega
Party	Candidate	Votes	%	±%
Liberal Reform	William Millard	2,966	40.6	
Labor	John Webster	2,386	32.6	
Independent	Hector McWilliam	1,571	21.5	
Independent	Frederick Bland	388	5.3	
Total formal votes		7,311	98.5	
Informal votes		109	1.5	
Turnout		7,420	76.2	
Second round result
Liberal Reform	William Millard	3,810	52.2	
Labor	John Webster	3,484	47.8	
Total formal votes		7,294	99.4	
Informal votes		46	0.6	
Turnout		7,340	75.4	
Liberal Reform hold				

=== Belmore ===
1913 New South Wales state election: Belmore
Party	Candidate	Votes	%	±%
Labor	Patrick Minahan	3,518	50.9	
Independent Labor	John English	2,500	36.2	
Liberal Reform	John Haynes	887	12.8	
Independent	Forbes Logie	10	0.1	
Total formal votes		6,915	96.6	
Informal votes		242	3.4	
Turnout		7,157	59.8	
Labor hold				

=== Bingara ===
1913 New South Wales state election: Bingara
Party	Candidate	Votes	%	±%
Farmers and Settlers	Robert Higgins	3,320	47.8	
Labor	George McDonald	3,317	47.8	
Country Party Association	Frank Cheesbrough	310	4.5	
Total formal votes		6,947	97.4	
Informal votes		182	2.6	
Turnout		7,129	70.5	
Second round result
Labor	George McDonald	3,773	51.8	
Farmers and Settlers	Robert Higgins	3,514	48.2	
Total formal votes		7,287	99.6	
Informal votes		32	0.4	
Turnout		7,319	72.4	
Labor hold				

=== Bondi ===
1913 New South Wales state election: Bondi
Party	Candidate	Votes	%	±%
Liberal Reform	James Macarthur-Onslow	4,567	55.7	
Labor	George Moxon	1,995	24.3	
Independent Liberal	Frank Farnell	1,638	20.0	
Total formal votes		8,200	98.2	
Informal votes		146	1.8	
Turnout		8,346	63.7	
Liberal Reform win		(new seat)		

=== Botany ===
1913 New South Wales state election: Botany
Party	Candidate	Votes	%	±%
Independent Labor	Fred Page	4,559	60.2	
Labor	David Johnstone	3,019	39.8	
Total formal votes		7,578	97.8	
Informal votes		170	2.2	
Turnout		7,748	64.2	
Member changed to Independent Labor from Labor				

=== Burrangong ===
1913 New South Wales state election: Burrangong
Party	Candidate	Votes	%	±%
Labor	George Burgess	3,803	50.3	
Farmers and Settlers	Arthur Trethowan	3,761	49.7	
Total formal votes		7,564	97.6	
Informal votes		187	2.4	
Turnout		7,751	67.5	
Labor hold				

=== Burwood ===
1913 New South Wales state election: Burwood
Party	Candidate	Votes	%	±%
Liberal Reform	Thomas Henley	5,680	67.5	
Labor	William Hocking	2,728	32.5	
Total formal votes		8,408	97.3	
Informal votes		235	2.7	
Turnout		8,643	68.4	
Liberal Reform hold				

=== Byron ===
1913 New South Wales state election: Byron
Party	Candidate	Votes	%	±%
Liberal Reform	John Perry	3,433	51.0	
Independent Liberal	Peter Street	2,416	35.9	
Independent	Robert Campbell	792	11.8	
Independent	John Pearson	86	1.3	
Total formal votes		6,727	97.5	
Informal votes		170	2.5	
Turnout		6,897	64.8	
Liberal Reform win		(new seat)		

=== Camden ===
1913 New South Wales state election: Camden
Party	Candidate	Votes	%	±%
Liberal Reform	John Hunt	4,492	63.1	
Labor	Michael O'Halloran	2,191	30.8	
Independent Liberal	William Watson	434	6.1	
Total formal votes		7,117	97.8	
Informal votes		161	2.2	
Turnout		7,278	65.6	
Liberal Reform hold				

=== Camperdown ===
1913 New South Wales state election: Camperdown
Party	Candidate	Votes	%	±%
Labor	Robert Stuart-Robertson	5,032	67.3	
Liberal Reform	William McMahon	2,446	32.7	
Total formal votes		7,478	97.9	
Informal votes		161	2.1	
Turnout		7,639	66.6	
Labor hold				

=== Canterbury ===
1913 New South Wales state election: Canterbury
Party	Candidate	Votes	%	±%
Labor	Henry Peters	5,691	52.0	
Liberal Reform	John Draper	4,701	43.0	
National Progressive	Richard Messiter	439	4.0	
Independent Liberal	Ernest Dent	111	1.0	
Total formal votes		10,942	71.8	
Informal votes		268	2.4	
Turnout		11,210	71.8	
Labor gain from Liberal Reform				

=== Castlereagh ===
1913 New South Wales state election: Castlereagh
Party	Candidate	Votes	%	±%
Labor	John Treflé	3,815	52.4	
Farmers and Settlers	Harold Blackett	3,466	47.6	
Total formal votes		7,281	97.0	
Informal votes		228	3.0	
Turnout		7,509	71.0	
Labor hold				

=== Cessnock ===
1913 New South Wales state election: Cessnock
Party	Candidate	Votes	%	±%
Labor	William Kearsley	5,606	86.8	
Liberal Reform	Charles Cheesbrough	564	8.7	
Socialist Labor	William North	290	4.5	
Total formal votes		6,460	97.7	
Informal votes		150	2.3	
Turnout		6,610	60.3	
Labor win		(new seat)		

=== Clarence ===
1913 New South Wales state election: Clarence
Party	Candidate	Votes	%	±%
Liberal Reform	John McFarlane	4,193	72.2	
Labor	Clem Johnson	1,612	27.8	
Total formal votes		5,805	96.6	
Informal votes		207	3.4	
Turnout		6,012	61.6	
Liberal Reform hold				

=== Cobar ===
1913 New South Wales state election: Cobar
Party	Candidate	Votes	%	±%
Labor	Charles Fern	3,529	76.0	
Liberal Reform	Maxwell Pahlow	1,114	24.0	
Total formal votes		4,643	97.2	
Informal votes		134	2.8	
Turnout		4,777	47.4	
Labor hold				

Cobar was significantly expanded, absorbing most of the abolished district of The Darling, including the town of Bourke.

=== Cootamundra ===
1913 New South Wales state election: Cootamundra
Party	Candidate	Votes	%	±%
Labor	William Holman	5,028	54.7	
Farmers and Settlers	Thomas Spring	4,157	45.3	
Total formal votes		9,185	99.2	
Informal votes		73	0.8	
Turnout		9,258	76.9	
Labor hold				

=== Corowa ===
1913 New South Wales state election: Corowa
Party	Candidate	Votes	%	±%
Farmers and Settlers	Richard Ball	4,445	65.5	
Labor	William Tomkins	2,341	34.5	
Total formal votes		6,786	98.2	
Informal votes		125	1.8	
Turnout		6,911	65.4	
Member changed to Farmers and Settlers from Liberal Reform				

=== Darling Harbour ===
1913 New South Wales state election: Darling Harbour
Party	Candidate	Votes	%	±%
Labor	John Cochran	3,585	64.9	
Independent Labor	Andrew Thomson	1,691	30.6	
Australasian Socialist	Frederick Riley	202	3.7	
Independent	Arthur Gloag	45	0.8	
Total formal votes		5,523	95.6	
Informal votes		255	4.4	
Turnout		5,778	54.4	
Labor hold				

=== Darlinghurst ===
1913 New South Wales state election: Darlinghurst
Party	Candidate	Votes	%	±%
Liberal Reform	Daniel Levy	4,055	52.8	
Labor	Frank Foster	3,622	47.2	
Total formal votes		7,677	96.7	
Informal votes		264	3.3	
Turnout		7,941	61.3	
Liberal Reform hold				

=== Drummoyne ===
1913 New South Wales state election: Drummoyne
Party	Candidate	Votes	%	±%
Liberal Reform	George Richards	5,035	56.2	
Labor	John Mudie	3,439	38.4	
National Progressive	Henry McDicken	411	4.6	
Independent	Henry Johnson	81	0.9	
Total formal votes		8,966	97.8	
Informal votes		204	2.2	
Turnout		9,170	70.6	
Liberal Reform win		(new seat)		

=== Dulwich Hill ===
1913 New South Wales state election: Dulwich Hill
Party	Candidate	Votes	%	±%
Liberal Reform	Tom Hoskins	5,316	59.5	
Labor	Arthur Jones	3,454	38.6	
Independent	Harrie McConnell	107	1.2	
National Progressive	Evan Prosser	61	0.7	
Total formal votes		8,938	98.0	
Informal votes		181	2.0	
Turnout		9,119	71.6	
Liberal Reform win		(new seat)		

=== Durham ===
1913 New South Wales state election: Durham
Party	Candidate	Votes	%	±%
Farmers and Settlers	William Brown	3,509	50.4	
Country Party Association	Walter Bennett	2,944	42.3	
Labor	William Walton	505	7.3	
Total formal votes		6,958	97.8	
Informal votes		158	2.2	
Turnout		7,116	73.9	
Member changed to Farmers and Settlers from Liberal Reform				

=== Enmore ===
1913 New South Wales state election: Enmore
Party	Candidate	Votes	%	±%
Liberal Reform	Gustav Borhsmann	4,458	49.8	
Labor	David Hall	4,368	48.8	
Independent	Wallace McKeon	129	1.4	
Total formal votes		8,955	98.7	
Informal votes		117	1.3	
Turnout		9,072	70.4	
Second round result
Labor	David Hall	5,235	53.9	
Liberal Reform	Gustav Bohrsmann	4,481	46.1	
Total formal votes		9,716	99.4	
Informal votes		57	0.6	
Turnout		9,773	75.8	
Labor win		(new seat)		

=== Glebe ===
1913 New South Wales state election: Glebe
Party	Candidate	Votes	%	±%
Labor	Tom Keegan	5,299	57.2	
Liberal Reform	Rudolph Bohrsmann	3,963	42.8	
Total formal votes		9,262	97.8	
Informal votes		211	2.2	
Turnout		9,473	73.4	
Labor hold				

=== Gloucester ===
1913 New South Wales state election: Gloucester
Party	Candidate	Votes	%	±%
Farmers and Settlers	Richard Price	3,750	53.7	
Labor	Albert Jones	1,441	20.6	
Country Party Association	David Cowan	1,372	19.7	
Independent	Robert Malcolm	420	6.0	
Total formal votes		6,983	98.0	
Informal votes		140	2.0	
Turnout		7,123	71.1	
Member changed to Farmers and Settlers from Liberal Reform				

=== Gordon ===
1913 New South Wales state election: Gordon
Party	Candidate	Votes	%	±%
Liberal Reform	Charles Wade	6,335	68.9	
Labor	Frederick Cowdroy	2,863	31.1	
Total formal votes		9,198	98.1	
Informal votes		177	1.9	
Turnout		9,375	70.4	
Liberal Reform hold				

=== Gough ===
1913 New South Wales state election: Gough
Party	Candidate	Votes	%	±%
Farmers and Settlers	Follett Thomas	4,227	52.1	
Labor	Henry Colditz	3,878	47.9	
Total formal votes		8,105	97.5	
Informal votes		207	2.5	
Turnout		8,312	78.5	
Member changed to Farmers and Settlers from Liberal Reform				

=== Goulburn ===
1913 New South Wales state election: Goulburn
Party	Candidate	Votes	%	±%
Liberal Reform	Augustus James	4,444	53.8	
Labor	Chester Davies	3,810	46.2	
Total formal votes		8,254	97.5	
Informal votes		213	2.5	
Turnout		8,467	72.7	
Liberal Reform hold				

=== Granville ===
1913 New South Wales state election: Granville
Party	Candidate	Votes	%	±%
Labor	Jack Lang	5,641	51.9	
Liberal Reform	John Nobbs	5,238	48.1	
Total formal votes		10,879	97.3	
Informal votes		305	2.7	
Turnout		11,184	74.8	
Labor gain from Liberal Reform				

=== Gwydir ===
1913 New South Wales state election: Gwydir
Party	Candidate	Votes	%	±%
Farmers and Settlers	John Crane	3,737	54.8	
Labor	George Jones	3,081	45.2	
Total formal votes		6,818	97.4	
Informal votes		182	2.6	
Turnout		7,000	63.2	
Farmers and Settlers gain from Labor				

=== Hartley ===
1913 New South Wales state election: Hartley
Party	Candidate	Votes	%	±%
Labor	James Dooley	4,643	55.3	
Liberal Reform	James Charlton	3,759	44.7	
Total formal votes		8,402	97.2	
Informal votes		241	2.8	
Turnout		8,643	71.4	
Labor hold				

=== Hastings and Macleay ===
1913 New South Wales state election: Hastings and Macleay
Party	Candidate	Votes	%	±%
Independent	Henry Morton	4,515	52.9	
Farmers and Settlers	Robert Davidson	4,025	47.1	
Total formal votes		8,540	98.4	
Informal votes		135	1.6	
Turnout		8,675	78.4	
Independent hold				

=== Hawkesbury ===
1913 New South Wales state election: Hawkesbury
Party	Candidate	Votes	%	±%
Liberal Reform	Brinsley Hall	4,114	62.2	
Labor	Frederick Webster	1,693	25.6	
Independent Liberal	Henry Wilson	810	12.2	
Total formal votes		6,617	97.1	
Informal votes		196	2.9	
Turnout		6,813	63.1	
Liberal Reform hold				

=== Hurstville ===
1913 New South Wales state election: Hurstville
Party	Candidate	Votes	%	±%
Liberal Reform	Varney Parkes	4,962	49.4	
Labor	Sam Toombs	4,656	46.4	
National Progressive	James Murray	420	4.2	
Total formal votes		10,038	97.7	
Informal votes		231	2.3	
Turnout		10,269	72.3	
Second round result
Labor	Sam Toombs	5,816	51.6	
Liberal Reform	Varney Parkes	5,448	48.4	
Total formal votes		11,264	99.3	
Informal votes		76	0.7	
Turnout		11,340	79.9	
Labor win		(new seat)		

=== Kahibah ===
1913 New South Wales state election: Kahibah
Party	Candidate	Votes	%	±%
Labor	Alfred Edden	4,407	65.4	
Liberal Reform	William Ellis	2,253	33.4	
Country Party Association	Edgar de Lough	77	1.1	
Total formal votes		6,737	97.4	
Informal votes		183	2.6	
Turnout		6,920	64.3	
Labor hold				

=== King ===
1913 New South Wales state election: King
Party	Candidate	Votes	%	±%
Labor	James Morrish	3,688	56.4	
Liberal Reform	Henry Manning	2,775	42.4	
Australasian Socialist	John Roche	75	1.2	
Total formal votes		6,538	98.6	
Informal votes		91	1.4	
Turnout		6,629	59.0	
Labor hold				

=== Lachlan ===
1913 New South Wales state election: Lachlan
Party	Candidate	Votes	%	±%
Labor	Thomas Brown	4,009	50.8	
Farmers and Settlers	Arthur Manning	3,588	45.4	
Country Party Association	Herbert Bowles	303	3.8	
Total formal votes		7,900	96.6	
Informal votes		275	3.4	
Turnout		8,175	68.5	
Labor hold				

=== Leichhardt ===
1913 New South Wales state election: Leichhardt
Party	Candidate	Votes	%	±%
Labor	Campbell Carmichael	4,918	57.0	
Liberal Reform	Henry Brierley	3,584	41.5	
Australasian Socialist	John Kilburn	127	1.5	
Total formal votes		8,629	98.3	
Informal votes		153	1.7	
Turnout		8,782	71.7	
Labor hold				

=== Lismore ===
1913 New South Wales state election: Lismore
Party	Candidate	Votes	%	±%
Farmers and Settlers	George Nesbitt	5,383	70.8	
Labor	Roger Kearney	2,218	29.2	
Total formal votes		7,601	97.9	
Informal votes		159	2.1	
Turnout		7,760	70.0	
Farmers and Settlers win		(new seat)		

=== Liverpool Plains ===
1913 New South Wales state election: Liverpool Plains
Party	Candidate	Votes	%	±%
Labor	William Ashford	3,598	52.0	
Liberal Reform	George Higgins	2,183	31.6	
Farmers and Settlers	Augustus Perrett	1,137	16.4	
Total formal votes		6,918	96.2	
Informal votes		270	3.8	
Turnout		7,188	69.6	
Labor hold				

=== Lyndhurst ===
1913 New South Wales state election: Lyndhurst
Party	Candidate	Votes	%	±%
Farmers and Settlers	Thomas Waddell	4,215	51.1	
Labor	Guy Arkins	4,033	48.9	
Total formal votes		8,248	97.8	
Informal votes		187	2.2	
Turnout		8,435	71.6	
Farmers and Settlers win		(new seat)		

=== Macquarie ===
1913 New South Wales state election: Macquarie
Party	Candidate	Votes	%	±%
Labor	Thomas Thrower	4,055	50.4	
Farmers and Settlers	Reginald Weaver	3,992	49.6	
Total formal votes		8,047	97.4	
Informal votes		216	2.6	
Turnout		8,263	79.7	
Labor hold				

=== Maitland ===
1913 New South Wales state election: Maitland
Party	Candidate	Votes	%	±%
Liberal Reform	Charles Nicholson	4,072	50.6	
Labor	John Fletcher	3,975	49.4	
Total formal votes		8,047	97.6	
Informal votes		195	2.4	
Turnout		8,242	78.0	
Liberal Reform gain from Independent Liberal				

- John Gillies (Independent Liberal) died in 1911. The by-election in October 1911 was won by Charles Nicholson (Liberal Reform) who retained the seat at the 1913 general election.

=== Marrickville ===
1913 New South Wales state election: Marrickville
Party	Candidate	Votes	%	±%
Labor	Thomas Crawford	4,911	61.4	
Liberal Reform	William Wallace	2,877	36.0	
National Progressive	Samuel Davidson	206	2.6	
Total formal votes		7,994	98.0	
Informal votes		162	2.0	
Turnout		8,156	65.7	
Labor hold				

=== Middle Harbour ===
1913 New South Wales state election: Middle Harbour
Party	Candidate	Votes	%	±%
Liberal Reform	Richard Arthur	5,785	64.6	
Labor	Ellison Quirk	3,068	34.3	
Independent	James Bray	76	0.9	
Independent	Henry Johnson	29	0.3	
Total formal votes		8,958	97.8	
Informal votes		205	2.2	
Turnout		9,163	67.1	
Liberal Reform hold				

=== Monaro ===
1913 New South Wales state election: Monaro
Party	Candidate	Votes	%	±%
Labor	Gus Miller	3,836	56.6	
Liberal Reform	Ernest Quodling	2,880	42.5	
Independent	James Hart	66	1.0	
Total formal votes		6,782	97.2	
Informal votes		192	2.8	
Turnout		6,974	72.5	
Labor hold				

=== Mosman ===
1913 New South Wales state election: Mosman
Party	Candidate	Votes	%	±%
Liberal Reform	Percy Colquhoun	5,776	66.2	
Labor	Edward Cohen	1,360	15.6	
Independent Liberal	William Fell	1,347	15.5	
Independent Liberal	William Bray	236	2.7	
Total formal votes		8,719	99.2	
Informal votes		72	0.8	
Turnout		8,791	67.1	
Liberal Reform win		(new seat)		

=== Mudgee ===
1913 New South Wales state election: Mudgee
Party	Candidate	Votes	%	±%
Labor	Bill Dunn	4,127	52.8	
Liberal Reform	Owen Gilbert	3,696	47.2	
Total formal votes		7,823	97.7	
Informal votes		182	2.3	
Turnout		8,005	82.2	
Labor hold				

=== Murray ===
1913 New South Wales state election: Murray
Party	Candidate	Votes	%	±%
Labor	Robert Scobie	3,035	55.2	
Liberal Reform	Robert Gibson	2,463	44.8	
Total formal votes		5,498	97.9	
Informal votes		118	2.1	
Turnout		5,616	53.2	
Labor hold				

=== Murrumbidgee ===
1913 New South Wales state election: Murrumbidgee
Party	Candidate	Votes	%	±%
Labor	Patrick McGarry	4,274	51.8	
Farmers and Settlers	Charles Hawkins	3,973	48.2	
Total formal votes		8,247	97.6	
Informal votes		203	2.4	
Turnout		8,450	68.1	
Labor hold				

=== Namoi ===
1913 New South Wales state election: Namoi
Party	Candidate	Votes	%	±%
Labor	George Black	3,151	53.3	
Liberal Reform	James Florance	2,760	46.7	
Total formal votes		5,911	97.1	
Informal votes		177	2.9	
Turnout		6,088	63.7	
Labor hold				

=== Newcastle ===
1913 New South Wales state election: Newcastle
Party	Candidate	Votes	%	±%
Labor	Arthur Gardiner	5,702	70.5	
Liberal Reform	John Fegan	2,391	29.5	
Total formal votes		8,093	98.2	
Informal votes		150	1.8	
Turnout		8,243	69.6	
Labor hold				

=== Newtown ===
1913 New South Wales state election: Newtown
Party	Candidate	Votes	%	±%
Labor	Robert Hollis	4,465	65.6	
Liberal Reform	Percy Stevens	2,198	32.3	
Australasian Socialist	Luke Jones	140	2.1	
Total formal votes		6,803	98.0	
Informal votes		141	2.0	
Turnout		6,944	62.2	
Labor hold				

=== Orange ===
1913 New South Wales state election: Orange
Party	Candidate	Votes	%	±%
Liberal Reform	John Fitzpatrick	4,493	53.3	
Labor	Frank Edwards	3,933	46.7	
Total formal votes		8,426	97.9	
Informal votes		182	2.1	
Turnout		8,608	76.0	
Liberal Reform hold				

=== Paddington ===
1913 New South Wales state election: Paddington
Party	Candidate	Votes	%	±%
Labor	John Osborne	4,676	56.8	
Liberal Reform	Reginald Harris	3,498	42.5	
Independent	Charles Carter	35	0.4	
Independent	James Jones	27	0.3	
Total formal votes		8,236	98.2	
Informal votes		154	1.8	
Turnout		8,390	66.0	
Labor hold				

=== Parramatta ===
1913 New South Wales state election: Parramatta
Party	Candidate	Votes	%	±%
Liberal Reform	Tom Moxham	4,379	47.9	
Labor	Frank Walford	3,944	43.2	
Independent Liberal	Walter Jago	815	8.9	
Total formal votes		9,138	99.0	
Informal votes		89	1.0	
Turnout		9,227	74.4	
Second round result
Liberal Reform	Tom Moxham	5,010	51.0	
Labor	Frank Walford	4,818	49.0	
Total formal votes		9,828	99.5	
Informal votes		46	0.5	
Turnout		9,874	79.6	
Liberal Reform hold				

=== Petersham ===
1913 New South Wales state election: Petersham
Party	Candidate	Votes	%	±%
Liberal Reform	John Cohen	unopposed		
Liberal Reform hold				

=== Phillip ===
1913 New South Wales state election: Phillip
Party	Candidate	Votes	%	±%
Labor	Richard Meagher	4,755	83.3	
Liberal Reform	Eden George	954	16.7	
Total formal votes		5,709	97.5	
Informal votes		145	2.5	
Turnout		5,854	56.9	
Labor hold				

=== Raleigh ===
1913 New South Wales state election: Raleigh
Party	Candidate	Votes	%	±%
Country Party Association	George Briner	3,047	45.9	
Liberal Reform	Henry Boultwood	2,663	40.1	
Labor	Theodore McLennan	925	13.9	
Total formal votes		6,635	96.6	
Informal votes		235	3.4	
Turnout		6,870	63.9	
Second round result
Country Party Association	George Briner	3,925	59.1	
Liberal Reform	Henry Boultwood	2,713	40.9	
Total formal votes		6,638	99.1	
Informal votes		59	0.9	
Turnout		6,697	62.3	
Member changed to Country Party Association from Independent Liberal				

=== Randwick ===
1913 New South Wales state election: Randwick
Party	Candidate	Votes	%	±%
Liberal Reform	David Storey	4,689	58.3	
Labor	William Brown	3,078	38.3	
Independent	William Melville	278	3.5	
Total formal votes		8,045	96.9	
Informal votes		255	3.1	
Turnout		8,300	57.0	
Member changed to Liberal Reform from Independent Liberal				

=== Redfern ===
1913 New South Wales state election: Redfern
Party	Candidate	Votes	%	±%
Labor	James McGowen	4,840	68.4	
Liberal Reform	George Howe	2,100	29.7	
Socialist Labor	Henry Ostler	140	2.0	
Total formal votes		7,080	97.6	
Informal votes		177	2.4	
Turnout		7,257	62.0	
Labor hold				

=== Rozelle ===
1913 New South Wales state election: Rozelle
Party	Candidate	Votes	%	±%
Labor	James Mercer	4,486	66.1	
Liberal Reform	Alan Chavasse	2,304	33.9	
Total formal votes		6,790	98.6	
Informal votes		99	1.4	
Turnout		6,889	64.2	
Labor hold				

=== Ryde ===
1913 New South Wales state election: Ryde
Party	Candidate	Votes	%	±%
Liberal Reform	William Thompson	6,055	64.6	
Labor	Murdock MacLeod	2,938	31.3	
National Progressive	Charles Summerhayes	385	4.1	
Total formal votes		9,378	97.7	
Informal votes		219	2.3	
Turnout		9,597	70.6	
Liberal Reform win		(new seat)		

=== St George ===
1913 New South Wales state election: St George
Party	Candidate	Votes	%	±%
Liberal Reform	William Wood	4,797	49.6	
Labor	William Bagnall	4,366	45.1	
National Progressive	Henry Broe	509	5.3	
Total formal votes		9,672	98.9	
Informal votes		110	1.1	
Turnout		9,782	74.8	
Second round result
Labor	William Bagnall	5,231	51.0	
Liberal Reform	William Wood	5,025	49.0	
Total formal votes		10,256	99.5	
Informal votes		46	0.5	
Turnout		10,302	78.8	
Labor gain from Liberal Reform				

=== St Leonards ===
1913 New South Wales state election: St Leonards
Party	Candidate	Votes	%	±%
Liberal Reform	Arthur Cocks	4,042	54.1	
Labor	George Down	3,264	43.7	
Independent	Frederick Meyer	86	1.2	
Independent	Peter Pollack	78	1.0	
Total formal votes		7,470	97.1	
Informal votes		221	2.9	
Turnout		7,691	63.0	
Liberal Reform hold				

=== Singleton ===
1913 New South Wales state election: Singleton
Party	Candidate	Votes	%	±%
Liberal Reform	James Fallick	3,294	52.8	
Labor	Thomas Braye	2,500	40.1	
Country Party Association	Leslie Hewitt	447	7.2	
Total formal votes		6,241	96.4	
Informal votes		231	3.6	
Turnout		6,472	66.5	
Liberal Reform hold				

=== Sturt ===
1913 New South Wales state election: Sturt
Party	Candidate	Votes	%	±%
Labor	John Cann	unopposed		
Labor hold				

=== Surry Hills ===
1913 New South Wales state election: Surry Hills
Party	Candidate	Votes	%	±%
Labor	Henry Hoyle	4,717	65.6	
Independent	William Walker	2,393	33.3	
Socialist Labor	Ludwig Klausen	82	1.1	
Total formal votes		7,192	98.3	
Informal votes		123	1.7	
Turnout		7,315	60.0	
Labor hold				

=== Tamworth ===
1913 New South Wales state election: Tamworth
Party	Candidate	Votes	%	±%
Farmers and Settlers	Frank Chaffey	2,620	36.5	
Labor	John Lord	2,315	32.3	
Independent	Robert Levien (defeated)	2,243	31.2	
Total formal votes		7,178	97.0	
Informal votes		225	3.0	
Turnout		7,403	74.2	
Second round result
Farmers and Settlers	Frank Chaffey	3,779	51.0	
Labor	John Lord	3,624	49.0	
Total formal votes		7,403	99.5	
Informal votes		39	0.5	
Turnout		7,442	74.5	
Farmers and Settlers gain from Independent Liberal				

Robert Levien was the sitting member.

=== Tenterfield ===
1913 New South Wales state election: Tenterfield
Party	Candidate	Votes	%	±%
Liberal Reform	Charles Lee	unopposed		
Liberal Reform hold				

=== Upper Hunter ===
1913 New South Wales state election: Upper Hunter
Party	Candidate	Votes	%	±%
Farmers and Settlers	Mac Abbott	3,803	50.1	
Labor	George Cann	3,149	41.5	
Independent Liberal	Henry Willis	640	8.4	
Total formal votes		7,592	97.0	
Informal votes		233	3.0	
Turnout		7,825	72.4	
Farmers and Settlers gain from Liberal Reform				

The sitting member was Henry Willis (Liberal Reform) who stood as an independent, describing himself as a radical liberal.

=== Wagga Wagga ===
1913 New South Wales state election: Wagga Wagga
Party	Candidate	Votes	%	±%
Labor	Walter Boston	3,951	51.2	
Liberal Reform	John Fletcher	3,765	48.8	
Total formal votes		7,716	97.4	
Informal votes		202	2.6	
Turnout		7,918	73.3	
Labor win		(new seat)		

=== Wallsend ===
1913 New South Wales state election: Wallsend
Party	Candidate	Votes	%	±%
Labor	John Estell	5,652	82.2	
Liberal Reform	Thomas Collins	825	12.0	
Socialist Labor	Joseph Charlton	401	5.8	
Total formal votes		6,878	97.5	
Informal votes		177	2.5	
Turnout		7,055	64.3	
Labor notional hold				

Wallesend largely replaced the abolished district of Waratah, held by John Estell (Labor).

=== Waverley ===
1913 New South Wales state election: Waverley
Party	Candidate	Votes	%	±%
Liberal Reform	Harold Jaques	3,743	42.9	
Labor	James Fingleton	3,280	37.6	
National Progressive	George Beeby	1,698	19.5	
Total formal votes		8,721	97.5	
Informal votes		220	2.5	
Turnout		8,941	69.9	
Second round result
Labor	James Fingleton	4,609	50.3	
Liberal Reform	Harold Jaques	4,547	49.7	
Total formal votes		9,156	99.4	
Informal votes		55	0.6	
Turnout		9,211	72.0	
Labor gain from Liberal Reform				

=== Wickham ===
1913 New South Wales state election: Wickham
Party	Candidate	Votes	%	±%
Labor	William Grahame	5,581	68.2	
Liberal Reform	Magnus Cromarty	2,607	31.8	
Total formal votes		8,188	98.3	
Informal votes		143	1.7	
Turnout		8,331	73.1	
Labor hold				

=== Willoughby ===
1913 New South Wales state election: Willoughby
Party	Candidate	Votes	%	±%
Labor	Edward Larkin	3,805	42.6	
Liberal Reform	Frederick Fleming	2,777	31.1	
Independent Liberal	William McMillan	1,951	21.8	
National Progressive	Arthur Carrington	212	2.4	
Independent Liberal	Edward Clark	197	2.2	
Total formal votes		8,942	99.0	
Informal votes		89	1.0	
Turnout		9,031	71.6	
Second round result
Labor	Edward Larkin	4,908	51.6	
Liberal Reform	Frederick Fleming	4,601	48.4	
Total formal votes		9,509	99.6	
Informal votes		39	0.4	
Turnout		9,548	75.7	
Labor win		(new seat)		

=== Willyama ===
1913 New South Wales state election: Willyama
Party	Candidate	Votes	%	±%
Labor	Jabez Wright	4,327	73.3	
Independent Liberal	William Ferguson	1,029	17.4	
Independent	Walter Wright	545	9.2	
Total formal votes		5,901	97.7	
Informal votes		137	2.3	
Turnout		6,038	62.8	
Labor win		(new seat)		

=== Wollondilly ===
1913 New South Wales state election: Wollondilly
Party	Candidate	Votes	%	±%
Liberal Reform	Frank Badgery	3,801	57.6	
Labor	James Donaldson	2,238	33.9	
Country Party Association	Samuel Emmett	290	4.4	
Independent Liberal	Thomas Raw	266	4.0	
Total formal votes		6,595	97.2	
Informal votes		188	2.8	
Turnout		6,783	66.4	
Liberal Reform hold				

=== Wollongong ===
1913 New South Wales state election: Wollongong
Party	Candidate	Votes	%	±%
Labor	John Nicholson	5,212	71.6	
Liberal Reform	Florence Healey	1,715	23.6	
Socialist Labor	Ernie Judd	351	4.8	
Total formal votes		7,278	97.0	
Informal votes		228	3.0	
Turnout		7,506	60.6	
Labor hold				

=== Woollahra ===
1913 New South Wales state election: Woollahra
Party	Candidate	Votes	%	±%
Liberal Reform	William Latimer	3,552	44.6	
Labor	Daniel Dwyer	2,707	34.0	
Independent Liberal	Philip Morton	1,226	15.4	
Independent Labor	Francis Cowling	475	6.0	
Total formal votes		7,960	99.0	
Informal votes		80	1.0	
Turnout		8,040	68.0	
Second round result
Liberal Reform	William Latimer	4,058	50.2	
Labor	Daniel Dwyer	4,020	49.8	
Total formal votes		8,078	99.5	
Informal votes		38	0.5	
Turnout		8,116	68.6	
Liberal Reform hold				

=== Yass ===
1913 New South Wales state election: Yass
Party	Candidate	Votes	%	±%
Labor	Greg McGirr	4,498	50.7	
Farmers and Settlers	Patrick Bourke	2,921	32.9	
Country Party Association	Robert Donaldson (defeated)	1,448	16.3	
Total formal votes		8,867	97.1	
Informal votes		260	2.9	
Turnout		9,127	75.1	
Labor hold				

Robert Donaldson was the sitting member for Wynyard which had been largely replaced by Yass.

== See also ==
- 1913 New South Wales state election
- Candidates of the 1913 New South Wales state election
- Members of the New South Wales Legislative Assembly, 1913–1917
