= Electoral results for the district of Hurstville =

Election results for Hurstville, New South Wales, Australia

Hurstville, an electoral district of the Legislative Assembly in the Australian state of New South Wales had two incarnation, from 1859 to 1920 and from 1927 to 1968.

Election	Member	Party
1913	Sam Toombs	Labor
1917	Thomas Ley	Nationalist
Election	Member	Party
1927	Walter Butler	Labor
1930	Walter Butler	Labor
1932	James Webb	United Australia
1935	James Webb	United Australia
1938	James Webb	United Australia
1939 by	Clive Evatt	Industrial Labor / Labor
1941	Clive Evatt	Labor
1944	Clive Evatt	Labor
1947	Clive Evatt	Labor
1950	Clive Evatt	Labor
1953	Clive Evatt	Labor
1956	Clive Evatt	Labor / Independent
1959	Bill Rigby	Labor
1962	Bill Rigby	Labor
1965	Tom Mead	Liberal
1968	Tom Mead	Liberal
1971	Tom Mead	Liberal
1973	Tom Mead	Liberal
1976	Kevin Ryan	Labor
1978	Kevin Ryan	Labor
1981	Kevin Ryan	Labor
1984	Guy Yeomans	Liberal
1988	Guy Yeomans	Liberal
1991	Morris Iemma	Labor
1995	Morris Iemma	Labor

== Election results ==
=== Elections in the 1990s ===
1995 New South Wales state election: Hurstville
Party	Candidate	Votes	%	±%
Labor	Morris Iemma	18,771	57.1	+8.3
Liberal	Mick Frawley	12,759	38.8	−3.3
Independent	Saad Turk	1,369	4.2	+4.2
Total formal votes		32,899	93.6	+4.9
Informal votes		2,240	6.4	−4.9
Turnout		35,139	94.3	
Two-party-preferred result
Labor	Morris Iemma	19,410	59.6	+5.0
Liberal	Mick Frawley	13,131	40.4	−5.0
Labor hold		Swing	+5.0	

==== 1991 ====
1991 New South Wales state election: Hurstville
Party	Candidate	Votes	%	±%
Labor	Morris Iemma	15,141	48.8	+2.3
Liberal	Phil White	13,063	42.1	0.0
Independent	Tony Wild	1,699	5.5	+5.5
Democrats	Paul Terrett	1,140	3.7	+3.7
Total formal votes		31,043	88.7	−7.5
Informal votes		3,962	11.3	+7.5
Turnout		35,005	94.7	
Two-party-preferred result
Labor	Morris Iemma	16,382	54.6	+2.8
Liberal	Phil White	13,620	45.4	−2.8
Labor gain from Liberal		Swing	+2.8	

=== Elections in the 1980s ===
==== 1988 ====
1988 New South Wales state election: Hurstville
Party	Candidate	Votes	%	±%
Liberal	Guy Yeomans	16,226	54.0	+3.6
Labor	Robert McClelland	11,315	37.7	−11.9
Independent	Joan Loew	2,487	8.3	+8.3
Total formal votes		30,028	97.3	−0.4
Informal votes		820	2.7	+0.4
Turnout		30,848	94.6	
Two-party-preferred result
Liberal	Guy Yeomans	16,766	56.6	+6.2
Labor	Robert McClelland	12,831	43.4	−6.2
Liberal hold		Swing	+6.2	

==== 1984 ====
1984 New South Wales state election: Hurstville
Party	Candidate	Votes	%	±%
Liberal	Guy Yeomans	14,427	50.9	+11.7
Labor	Kevin Ryan	13,896	49.1	−8.2
Total formal votes		28,323	97.7	+0.3
Informal votes		657	2.3	−0.3
Turnout		28,980	93.3	+1.6
Liberal gain from Labor		Swing	+10.1	

==== 1981 ====
1981 New South Wales state election: Hurstville
Party	Candidate	Votes	%	±%
Labor	Kevin Ryan	16,053	57.3	−6.4
Liberal	Frederick Harvison	10,990	39.2	+2.9
Democrats	Frank Low	982	3.5	+3.5
Total formal votes		28,025	97.4	
Informal votes		749	2.6	
Turnout		28,774	91.7	
Two-party-preferred result
Labor	Kevin Ryan	16,353	59.2	−4.5
Liberal	Frederick Harvison	11,290	40.8	+4.5
Labor hold		Swing	−4.5	

=== Elections in the 1970s ===
==== 1978 ====
1978 New South Wales state election: Hurstville
Party	Candidate	Votes	%	±%
Labor	Kevin Ryan	19,296	63.7	+15.1
Liberal	Ian Brown	10,984	36.3	−12.5
Total formal votes		30,280	98.1	−0.7
Informal votes		593	1.9	+0.7
Turnout		30,873	93.5	−0.1
Labor hold		Swing	+13.6	

==== 1976 ====
1976 New South Wales state election: Hurstville
Party	Candidate	Votes	%	±%
Liberal	Tom Mead	14,920	48.8	+0.1
Labor	Kevin Ryan	14,855	48.6	+6.1
Australia	Bernhard Fiegel	791	2.6	+2.6
Total formal votes		30,566	98.8	+0.7
Informal votes		382	1.2	−0.7
Turnout		30,948	93.6	−0.4
Two-party-preferred result
Labor	Kevin Ryan	15,305	50.1	+3.2
Liberal	Tom Mead	15,261	49.9	−3.2
Labor gain from Liberal		Swing	+3.2	

==== 1973 ====
1973 New South Wales state election: Hurstville
Party	Candidate	Votes	%	±%
Liberal	Tom Mead	14,228	48.7	+1.3
Labor	Kevin Ryan	12,398	42.5	+2.0
Independent	Paul Flottmann	1,761	6.0	+6.0
Democratic Labor	Anthony Young	821	2.8	−2.5
Total formal votes		29,208	98.1	
Informal votes		558	1.9	
Turnout		29,766	94.0	
Two-party-preferred result
Liberal	Tom Mead	15,504	53.1	+0.3
Labor	Kevin Ryan	13,704	46.9	−0.3
Liberal hold		Swing	+0.3	

==== 1971 ====
1971 New South Wales state election: Hurstville
Party	Candidate	Votes	%	±%
Liberal	Tom Mead	12,653	47.4	−5.2
Labor	Kenneth Hallen	10,810	40.5	−2.3
Democratic Labor	Peter Abrams	1,419	5.3	+0.6
Defence of Government Schools	Judith Sainsbury	964	3.6	+3.6
Australia	Ralph Catts	873	3.3	+3.3
Total formal votes		26,719	97.5	
Informal votes		673	2.5	
Turnout		27,392	95.0	
Two-party-preferred result
Liberal	Tom Mead	14,115	52.8	−3.2
Labor	Kenneth Hallen	12,604	47.2	+3.2
Liberal hold		Swing	−3.2	

=== Elections in the 1960s ===
==== 1968 ====
1968 New South Wales state election: Hurstville
Party	Candidate	Votes	%	±%
Liberal	Tom Mead	14,034	49.6	+2.7
Labor	Bill Rigby	12,951	45.8	−2.9
Democratic Labor	Kevin Davis	1,322	4.7	+0.3
Total formal votes		28,307	97.7	
Informal votes		669	2.3	
Turnout		28,976	95.1	
Two-party-preferred result
Liberal	Tom Mead	15,178	53.6	+3.0
Labor	Bill Rigby	13,129	46.4	−3.0
Liberal hold		Swing	+3.0	

==== 1965 ====
1965 New South Wales state election: Hurstville
Party	Candidate	Votes	%	±%
Labor	Bill Rigby	11,883	48.7	−3.7
Liberal	Tom Mead	11,427	46.9	+4.2
Democratic Labor	Kevin Davis	1,068	4.4	+2.4
Total formal votes		24,378	98.2	−0.3
Informal votes		456	1.8	+0.3
Turnout		24,834	94.4	0.0
Two-party-preferred result
Liberal	Tom Mead	12,334	50.6	+5.9
Labor	Bill Rigby	12,044	49.4	−5.9
Liberal gain from Labor		Swing	+5.9	

==== 1962 ====
1962 New South Wales state election: Hurstville
Party	Candidate	Votes	%	±%
Labor	Bill Rigby	12,796	52.4	+21.2
Liberal	Richard Hawkins	10,257	42.0	+4.0
Independent	Thomas Dalton	893	3.7	+3.7
Democratic Labor	Thomas Brosnan	478	2.0	+2.0
Total formal votes		24,424	98.5	
Informal votes		380	1.5	
Turnout		24,804	94.4	
Two-party-preferred result
Labor	Bill Rigby	13,517	55.3	+1.5
Liberal	Richard Hawkins	10,907	44.7	−1.5
Labor hold		Swing	+1.5	

=== Elections in the 1950s ===
==== 1959 ====
1959 New South Wales state election: Hurstville
Party	Candidate	Votes	%	±%
Liberal	Hedley Mallard	9,359	38.0	
Labor	Bill Rigby	7,680	31.2	
Independent	Clive Evatt (defeated)	7,193	29.2	
Independent	Edward Merryfull	378	1.5	
Total formal votes		24,610	98.5	
Informal votes		378	1.5	
Turnout		24,988	95.1	
Two-party-preferred result
Labor	Bill Rigby	13,244	53.8	
Liberal	Hedley Mallard	11,366	46.2	
Labor hold		Swing		

The sitting member was Clive Evatt was expelled from Labor on 13 July 1956 and sat as an Independent.

==== 1956 ====
1956 New South Wales state election: Hurstville
Party	Candidate	Votes	%	±%
Labor	Clive Evatt	11,459	51.4	−7.2
Liberal	Hedley Mallard	9,982	44.8	+3.4
Independent	Edward Merryfull	835	3.8	+3.8
Total formal votes		22,276	98.7	+0.5
Informal votes		300	1.3	−0.5
Turnout		22,576	94.8	−0.3
Two-party-preferred result
Labor	Clive Evatt	11,876	53.3	−5.3
Liberal	Hedley Mallard	10,400	46.7	+5.3
Labor hold		Swing	−5.3	

==== 1953 ====
1953 New South Wales state election: Hurstville
Party	Candidate	Votes	%	±%
Labor	Clive Evatt	13,187	58.6	
Liberal	Bill Arthur	9,317	41.4	
Total formal votes		22,504	98.2	
Informal votes		404	1.8	
Turnout		22,908	95.1	
Labor hold		Swing		

==== 1950 ====
1950 New South Wales state election: Hurstville
Party	Candidate	Votes	%	±%
Labor	Clive Evatt	12,240	53.8	
Liberal	Leslie Webster	10,506	46.2	
Total formal votes		22,746	98.7	
Informal votes		308	1.3	
Turnout		23,054	94.5	
Labor hold		Swing		

=== Elections in the 1940s ===
==== 1947 ====
1947 New South Wales state election: Hurstville
Party	Candidate	Votes	%	±%
Labor	Clive Evatt	15,069	57.1	−9.5
Liberal	Leslie Webster	11,310	42.9	+9.5
Total formal votes		26,379	98.7	+2.1
Informal votes		350	1.3	−2.1
Turnout		26,729	96.3	+1.6
Labor hold		Swing	−9.5	

==== 1944 ====
1944 New South Wales state election: Hurstville
Party	Candidate	Votes	%	±%
Labor	Clive Evatt	15,663	66.6	−1.1
Democratic	Percy Macpherson	7,846	33.4	+1.1
Total formal votes		23,509	96.6	−1.8
Informal votes		824	3.4	+1.8
Turnout		24,333	94.7	−0.4
Labor hold		Swing	−1.1	

==== 1941 ====
1941 New South Wales state election: Hurstville
Party	Candidate	Votes	%	±%
Labor	Clive Evatt	14,764	67.7	
United Australia	Roland Murray	7,042	32.3	
Total formal votes		21,806	98.4	
Informal votes		354	1.6	
Turnout		22,160	95.1	
Labor hold		Swing		

=== Elections in the 1930s ===
==== 1939 by-election ====
1939 Hurstville by-election Saturday 18 March
Party	Candidate	Votes	%	±%
Industrial Labor	Clive Evatt	7,017	33.8	
United Australia	Alfred Thomas	7,925	38.1	−18.0
Labor	John McGrath	5,852	28.1	−15.8
Total formal votes		20,794	98.5	+0.6
Informal votes		309	1.5	−0.6
Turnout		21,103	93.9	−3.2
Two-party-preferred result
Industrial Labor	Clive Evatt	12,168	58.5	
United Australia	Alfred Thomas	8,626	41.5	−14.6
Industrial Labor gain from United Australia		Swing	N/A	

James Webb (United Australia) died.

==== 1938 ====
1938 New South Wales state election: Hurstville
Party	Candidate	Votes	%	±%
United Australia	James Webb	11,493	56.1	+5.8
Labor	Michael Croot	8,983	43.9	−2.5
Total formal votes		20,476	97.9	−0.3
Informal votes		440	2.1	+0.3
Turnout		20,916	97.1	−0.4
United Australia hold		Swing	N/A	

==== 1935 ====
1935 New South Wales state election: Hurstville
Party	Candidate	Votes	%	±%
United Australia	James Webb	9,587	50.3	−1.3
Labor (NSW)	Walter Butler	8,840	46.4	+3.5
Federal Labor	Richard Bramston	616	3.2	−1.4
Total formal votes		19,043	98.2	−0.5
Informal votes		345	1.8	+0.5
Turnout		19,388	97.5	−0.4
United Australia hold		Swing	N/A	

- Preferences were not distributed.

==== 1932 ====
1932 New South Wales state election: Hurstville
Party	Candidate	Votes	%	±%
United Australia	James Webb	9,744	51.6	+15.6
Labor (NSW)	Walter Butler	8,093	42.9	−20.3
Federal Labor	Gertrude Melville	873	4.6	+4.6
Communist	James Stubbs	154	0.8	+0.1
Total formal votes		18,864	98.7	+0.5
Informal votes		247	1.3	−0.5
Turnout		19,111	97.9	+1.6
United Australia gain from Labor (NSW)		Swing	N/A	

- Preferences were not distributed.

==== 1930 ====
1930 New South Wales state election: Hurstville
Party	Candidate	Votes	%	±%
Labor	Walter Butler	11,511	63.2	
Nationalist	James Webb	6,561	36.0	
Communist	William Wright	132	0.7	
Total formal votes		18,204	98.2	
Informal votes		342	1.8	
Turnout		18,546	96.3	
Labor hold		Swing		

=== Elections in the 1920s ===
==== 1927 ====
1927 New South Wales state election: Hurstville
Party	Candidate	Votes	%	±%
Nationalist	John Nield	6,910	48.4	
Labor	Walter Butler	6,908	48.4	
Independent	Walter Anderson	429	3.0	
Independent	William Hodge	41	0.3	
Total formal votes		14,288	98.9	
Informal votes		153	1.1	
Turnout		14,441	85.8	
Two-party-preferred result
Labor	Walter Butler	7,039	50.1	
Nationalist	John Nield	7,002	49.9	
Labor win		(new seat)		

=== Elections in the 1910s ===
==== 1917 ====
1917 New South Wales state election: Hurstville
Party	Candidate	Votes	%	±%
Nationalist	Thomas Ley	7,904	59.4	+10.0
Labor	Sam Toombs	5,395	40.6	−5.8
Total formal votes		13,299	99.2	+1.5
Informal votes		111	0.8	−1.5
Turnout		13,410	68.2	−4.1
Nationalist gain from Labor		Swing	+11.0	

==== 1913 ====
1913 New South Wales state election: Hurstville
Party	Candidate	Votes	%	±%
Liberal Reform	Varney Parkes	4,962	49.4	
Labor	Sam Toombs	4,656	46.4	
National Progressive	James Murray	420	4.2	
Total formal votes		10,038	97.7	
Informal votes		231	2.3	
Turnout		10,269	72.3	

1913 New South Wales state election: Hurstville - Second Round Saturday 13 December
Party	Candidate	Votes	%	±%
Labor	Sam Toombs	5,816	51.6	
Liberal Reform	Varney Parkes	5,448	48.4	
Total formal votes		11,264	99.3	
Informal votes		76	0.7	
Turnout		11,340	79.9	
Labor win		(new seat)		
