= Members of the New South Wales Legislative Assembly, 1913–1917 =

Members of the New South Wales Legislative Assembly who served in the 23rd parliament of New South Wales held their seats from 1913 to 1917. They were elected at the 1913 state election on 6 December 1913. The Speaker was Richard Meagher.

Name	Party		Electorate	Term in office			
Name	1913-1916	1917 (Note: The November 1916 Labor split over conscription completely recast the party composition of the assembly. Premier Holman, and twenty of his supporters were expelled from the party for defying party policy and supporting conscription. They joined a grand coalition with the members of the various conservative parties. By 1917, this had coalesced into the Nationalist Party of Australia. Four Labor members were also expelled for supporting conscription and they continued to sit as Independent Labor. The remaining 25 Labor members opposed conscription and became the official opposition ALP.)	Electorate	Term in office			
Mac Abbott	1913-1916	1917		Farmers and Settlers	Nationalist	Upper Hunter	1913–1918
Guy Arkins (Note: Castlereagh Labor MLA John Treflé died on 11 January 1915. The resultant by-election was won by Labor candidate Guy Arkins on 20 February 1915.)	Labor	Nationalist (Note: Expelled from Labor Party on 7 November 1916.)	Castlereagh	1915–1930, 1938–1941			
Richard Arthur	Liberal Reform	Nationalist	Middle Harbour	1904–1932			
William Ashford	Labor	Nationalist	Liverpool Plains	1910–1925			
Frank Badgery (Note: Wollondilly Liberal MLA Frank Badgery died on 28 August 1915. The resultant by-election was won by Liberal candidate George Fuller on 2 October 1915.)	Liberal Reform		Wollondilly	1910–1915			
William Bagnall	Labor	Nationalist	St George	1913–1925 1925–1927			
Richard Ball	Farmers and Settlers	Nationalist	Corowa	1895–1898, 1904–1937			
George Black	Labor	Independent Labor	Namoi	1891–1998, 1910–1917			
Walter Boston	Labor	Labor	Wagga Wagga	1913–1917			
George Braund (Note: Armidale Liberal MLA George Braund died on active service on 4 May 1915. The resultant by-election was won by Liberal candidate Herbert Lane on 18 September 1915.)	Liberal Reform		Armidale	1913–1915			
George Briner	Country Party Association	Nationalist	Raleigh	1901–1920			
Percy Brookfield (Note: Sturt MLA John Cann had been expelled from Labor in November 1916 and the following month resigned to accept the position of Commissioner of Railways. The resultant by-election was won by Labor candidate Percy Brookfield on 3 February 1917.)		Labor	Sturt	1917–1921			
Thomas Brown	Labor	Labor	Lachlan	1894–1901 1913–1917			
William Brown	Farmers and Settlers	Nationalist	Durham	1907–1917			
Albert Bruntnell (Note: Parramatta Liberal MLA Tom Moxham died on 11 January 1916. The resultant by-election was won by Liberal candidate Albert Bruntnell on 12 February 1915.)	Liberal Reform	Nationalist	Parramatta	1906–1907 1910–1913 1916–1929			
George Burgess	Labor	Nationalist	Burrangong	1901–1917			
John Cann (Note: Voted against Labor's censure motion on 10 November 1916.)	Labor		Sturt	1891–1916			
George Cann (Note: Canterbury Labor MLA Henry Peters was declared bankrupt in October 1914. The resultant by-election was won by Labor candidate George Cann on 10 October 1914.)	Labor	Labor	Canterbury	1914–1927			
Campbell Carmichael	Labor	Labor	Leichhardt	1907–1920			
Frank Chaffey	Farmers and Settlers	Nationalist	Tamworth	1913–1940			
John Cochran	Labor	Labor	Darling Harbour	1910–1920			
Arthur Cocks	Liberal Reform	Nationalist	St Leonards	1910–1925			
John Cohen	Liberal Reform	Nationalist	Petersham	1898–1919			
Percy Colquhoun	Liberal Reform	Nationalist	Mosman	1913–1920			
John Crane	Farmers and Settlers	Nationalist	Gwydir	1913–1920			
Tom Crawford	Labor	Nationalist	Marrickville	1910–1917			
John Cusack	Labor	Independent Labor	Albury	1910–1917			
James Dooley	Labor	Labor	Hartley	1907–1927			
Bill Dunn	Labor	Labor	Mudgee	1910–1911, 1911–1932, 1935–1950			
Ernest Durack	Labor	Labor	Bathurst	1913–1917			
Alfred Edden	Labor	Nationalist	Kahibah	1891–1920			
John Estell	Labor	Labor	Wallsend	1901–1922			
James Fallick	Liberal Reform	Nationalist	Singleton	1901–1920			
Charles Fern	Labor	Labor	Cobar	1913–1918			
James Fingleton	Labor	Labor	Waverley	1913–1917 1920			
John Fitzpatrick	Liberal Reform	Nationalist	Orange	1895–1904 1907–1930			
George Fuller	Liberal Reform	Nationalist	Wollondilly	1889–1894 1915–1928			
Arthur Gardiner	Labor	Independent Labor	Newcastle	1910–1922			
Alexander Graff (Note: Drummoyne Liberal MLA George Richards died on 4 December 1915. The resultant by-election was won by Liberal candidate Alexander Graff on 22 January 1916.)	Liberal Reform	Nationalist	Drummoyne	1916–1920			
William Grahame	Labor	Nationalist	Wickham	1907–1920			
Arthur Griffith	Labor	Independent Labor	Annandale	1894–1903 1904–1920			
Arthur Grimm	Farmers and Settlers	Nationalist	Ashburnham	1913–1925			
Brinsley Hall	Liberal Reform	Nationalist	Hawkesbury	1901–1917			
David Hall	Labor	Nationalist	Enmore	1901–1904 1913–1920			
John Haynes (Note: Willoughby Labor MLA Edward Larkin died in action on 25 April 1915. The resultant by-election was won by Independent candidate John Haynes on 25 September 1915.)	Independent Democrat	Independent	Willoughby	1887–1904 1915–1917			
Thomas Henley	Liberal Reform	Nationalist	Burwood	1904–1935			
Simon Hickey	Labor	Labor	Alexandria	1912–1922			
Robert Hollis	Labor	Nationalist	Newtown	1901–1917			
William Holman	Labor	Nationalist	Cootamundra	1898–1920			
Tom Hoskins	Liberal Reform	Nationalist	Dulwich Hill	1913–1927			
Henry Hoyle	Labor	Nationalist	Surry Hills	1891–1994 1910–1917			
John Hunt	Liberal Reform	Nationalist	Camden	1907–1920			
Augustus James	Liberal Reform	Nationalist	Goulburn	1907–1920			
William Kearsley	Labor	Labor	Cessnock	1910–1921			
Tom Keegan	Labor	Labor	Glebe	1910–1920 1921–1935			
Herbert Lane	Liberal Reform	Nationalist	Armidale	1915–1920			
Jack Lang	Labor	Labor	Granville	1913–1943, 1943–1946			
Edward Larkin	Labor		Willoughby	1913–1915			
William Latimer	Liberal Reform	Nationalist	Woollahra	1901–1920			
Charles Lee	Liberal Reform	Nationalist	Tenterfield	1884–1920			
Daniel Levy	Liberal Reform	Nationalist	Darlinghurst	1901–1937			
James Macarthur-Onslow	Liberal Reform	Nationalist	Bondi	1907–1922			
George McDonald (Note: At the Easter 1916 NSW Labor Conference, a motion of no confidence in the Holman government was passed. Holman resigned the Labor leadership but not the premiership or his seat. When no willing alternative leader was found, the motion of no confidence was reversed and Holman restored. Bingara MLA George McDonald resigned from the party and his seat as a protest at the Conference's behaviour. He was returned at the 1916 Bingara state by-election as an independent on 10 June 1916.)	Labor / Independent	Nationalist	Bingara	1910–1920			
John McFarlane (Note: Clarence Liberal MLA John McFarlane died on 9 July 1915. The resultant by-election was won by Farmers and Settlers candidate William Zuill on 14 August 1915.)	Liberal Reform		Clarence	1887–1915			
Patrick McGarry	Labor	Nationalist	Murrumbidgee	1904–1920			
Greg McGirr	Labor	Labor	Yass	1913–1925			
James McGowen	Labor	Nationalist	Redfern	1891–1917			
Richard Meagher	Labor	Independent Labor	Phillip	1895 1898–1904 1907–1917			
James Mercer	Labor	Nationalist	Rozelle	1907–1917			
William Millard	Liberal Reform	Nationalist	Bega	1894–1920 1920–1921			
Gus Miller	Labor	Labor	Monaro	1889–1918			
Patrick Minahan	Labor	Labor	Belmore	1910–1917 1920–1927			
Henry Morton	Independent	Nationalist	Hastings and Macleay	1910–1920			
Mark Morton	Liberal Reform	Nationalist	Allowrie	1901–1920 1922–1938			
James Morrish	Labor	Nationalist	King	1910–1917			
Tom Moxham	Liberal Reform		Parramatta	1901–1916			
George Nesbitt	Farmers and Settlers	Nationalist	Lismore	1913–1925			
Charles Nicholson	Liberal Reform	Nationalist	Maitland	1911–1920			
John Nicholson	Labor	Nationalist	Wollongong	1891–1917			
John Osborne	Labor	Labor	Paddington	1910–1919			
Fred Page	Independent Labor	Nationalist	Botany	1907–1917			
John Perry	Liberal Reform	Nationalist	Byron	1889–1920			
Henry Peters	Labor		Canterbury	1907–1914			
Richard Price	Farmers and Settlers	Nationalist	Gloucester	1894–1904 1907–1922			
George Richards	Liberal Reform	Nationalist	Drummoyne	1913–1915			
William Robson	Liberal Reform	Nationalist	Ashfield	1905–1920			
Robert Scobie	Labor	Nationalist	Murray	1901–1917			
David Storey	Liberal Reform	Nationalist	Randwick	1894–1920			
John Storey	Labor	Labor	Balmain	1901–1904 1907–1921			
Robert Stuart-Robertson	Labor	Labor	Camperdown	1907–1933			
Follett Thomas	Farmers and Settlers	Nationalist	Gough	1903–1920			
William Thompson	Liberal Reform	Nationalist	Ryde	1913–1920			
Thomas Thrower	Labor	Labor	Macquarie	1904–1917			
Sam Toombs	Labor	Labor	Hurstville	1913–1917			
John Treflé	Labor		Castlereagh	1906–1915			
Thomas Waddell	Farmers and Settlers	Nationalist	Lyndhurst	1897–1917			
Charles Wade	Liberal Reform	Nationalist	Gordon	1903–1917			
Jabez Wright	Labor	Labor	Willyama	1913–1920 1921–1922			
William Zuill	Farmers and Settlers	Nationalist	Clarence	1915–1920			

== See also ==
- First Holman ministry
- Second Holman ministry
- Results of the 1913 New South Wales state election
- Candidates of the 1913 New South Wales state election
