= Electoral results for the district of St George =

Election results for state seat of St George, New South Wales, Australia

St George, an electoral district of the Legislative Assembly in the Australian state of New South Wales was created in 1894 and abolished in 1904.

Election	Member	Party								
1894	Joseph Carruthers	Free Trade								
1895	Joseph Carruthers	Free Trade								
1898	Joseph Carruthers	Free Trade								
1901	Joseph Carruthers	Liberal Reform								
1904	Joseph Carruthers	Liberal Reform								
1907	Joseph Carruthers	Liberal Reform								
1908 by	William Taylor	Liberal Reform								
1910	William Taylor	Liberal Reform								
1913	William Bagnall	Labor								
1917	William Bagnall	Nationalist	Member	Party	Member	Party	Member	Party	Member	Party
1920	William Bagnall	Nationalist	George Cann	Labor	Mark Gosling	Labor	Thomas Ley	Progressive	Guy Arkins	Nationalist
1922	William Bagnall	Nationalist	George Cann	Labor	Mark Gosling	Labor	Thomas Ley	Nationalist	Guy Arkins	Nationalist
1925	Joseph Cahill	Labor	George Cann	Labor	Mark Gosling	Labor	Thomas Ley	Nationalist	Guy Arkins	Nationalist
1925 Appt	Joseph Cahill	Labor	George Cann	Labor	Mark Gosling	Labor	William Bagnall	Nationalist	Guy Arkins	Nationalist
1927	Joseph Cahill	Labor								

== Election results ==
=== Elections in the 1920s ===
==== 1927 ====
1927 New South Wales state election: St George
Party	Candidate	Votes	%	±%
Labor	Joseph Cahill	8,137	55.9	
Nationalist	James Morrish	6,430	44.1	
Total formal votes		14,567	99.1	
Informal votes		138	0.9	
Turnout		14,705	86.9	
Labor win		(new seat)		

==== 1925 appointment ====
Thomas Ley resigned to successfully contest the federal seat of Barton at the 1925 election. Between 1920 and 1927 the Legislative Assembly was elected using a form of proportional representation with multi-member seats and a single transferable vote (modified Hare-Clark). The Parliamentary Elections (Casual Vacancies) Act, provided that casual vacancies were filled by the next unsuccessful candidate on the incumbent member's party list. William Bagnall had the most votes of the unsuccessful Nationalist candidates at the 1925 election and took his seat on 30 September 1925.

==== 1925 ====
1925 New South Wales state election: St George
Party	Candidate	Votes	%	±%
Quota		10,607		
Nationalist	Thomas Ley (elected 1)	16,171	25.4	+6.4
Nationalist	Guy Arkins (elected 3)	4,393	6.9	−9.5
Nationalist	William Bagnall (defeated)	3,979	6.2	−2.9
Nationalist	Cecil Monro	3,528	5.5	+5.5
Nationalist	Francis Farrar	1,227	1.9	−0.7
Nationalist	Reginald Reid	608	1.0	+1.0
Nationalist	Thomas Casserly	497	0.8	+0.8
Labor	Mark Gosling (elected 2)	11,731	18.4	+2.5
Labor	Joseph Cahill (elected 5)	6,203	9.8	+9.8
Labor	George Cann (elected 4)	6,166	9.7	−3.2
Labor	George Burns	4,790	7.5	+7.5
Labor	Ernest Sheiles	1,472	2.3	+2.3
Protestant Labour	Walter Anderson	1,068	1.7	+1.7
Protestant Labour	Arthur Jones	612	1.0	+1.0
Protestant Labour	Roy Hindwood	439	0.7	+0.7
Protestant Labour	William Goulden	313	0.5	+0.5
Protestant Labour	James Dunlop	195	0.3	+0.3
Independent	Alfred Dicker	182	0.3	+0.3
Independent	John Cooper	39	0.1	−0.1
Independent	Ernest Lambourne	26	0.04	+0.04
Total formal votes		63,639	96.2	−0.2
Informal votes		2,487	3.8	+0.2
Turnout		66,126	73.3	−0.2
Party total votes
Nationalist		30,403	47.8	−5.6
Labor		30,362	47.7	+5.6
Protestant Labour		2,627	4.1	+4.1
Independent	Alfred Dicker	182	0.3	+0.3
Independent	John Cooper	39	0.1	−0.1
Independent	Ernest Lambourne	26	0.04	+0.04

==== 1922 ====
1922 New South Wales state election: St George
Party	Candidate	Votes	%	±%
Quota		8,832		
Nationalist	Thomas Ley (elected 1)	10,071	19.0	+19.0
Nationalist	Guy Arkins (elected 2)	8,717	16.4	+6.9
Nationalist	William Bagnall (elected 4)	4,829	9.1	−6.2
Nationalist	John Ewen	2,636	5.0	+5.0
Nationalist	Francis Farrar	1,371	2.6	+2.6
Nationalist	John Willson	694	1.3	+1.3
Labor	Mark Gosling (elected 3)	8,423	15.9	+10.5
Labor	George Cann (elected 5)	6,818	12.9	−8.1
Labor	Sam Toombs	4,852	9.2	−0.9
Labor	Patrick Donovan	1,586	3.0	+0.5
Labor	Arthur Jones	610	1.2	+1.2
Progressive	Reginald McDonald	1,999	3.8	+3.8
Progressive	John Cordell	126	0.2	+0.2
Progressive	John Wilson	80	0.1	+0.1
Independent	John Cooper	98	0.2	+0.2
Independent	Henry Short	62	0.1	+0.1
Independent	John Gager	17	0.03	+0.03
Total formal votes		52,989	96.4	+6.0
Informal votes		1,963	3.6	−6.0
Turnout		54,952	73.5	+15.9
Party total votes
Nationalist		28,318	53.4	+21.1
Labor		22,289	42.1	+0.4
Progressive		2,205	4.2	−13.5
Independent	John Cooper	98	0.2	+0.2
Independent	Henry Short	62	0.1	+0.1
Independent	John Gager	17	0.03	+0.03

==== 1920 ====
1920 New South Wales state election: St George
Party	Candidate	Votes	%	±%
Quota		5,569		
Labor	George Cann (elected 1)	7,026	21.0	
Labor	Sam Toombs	3,384	10.1	
Labor	Mark Gosling (elected 5)	1,800	5.4	
Labor	William Gibbs	877	2.6	
Labor	Patrick Donovan	842	2.5	
Nationalist	William Bagnall (elected 3)	5,103	15.3	
Nationalist	Guy Arkins (elected 4)	3,191	9.5	
Nationalist	Frederick Reed	2,497	7.5	
Progressive	Thomas Ley (elected 2)	4,440	13.3	
Progressive	Charles Rosenthal	1,485	4.4	
Democratic	William O'Driscoll	2,227	6.7	
Soldiers & Citizens	Charles Church	177	0.5	
Soldiers & Citizens	Charles Rider	69	0.2	
Independent	Joseph Andrew	222	0.7	
Independent	Sydney Cook	70	0.2	
Total formal votes		33,410	90.4	
Informal votes		3,545	9.6	
Turnout		36,955	57.6	
Party total votes
Labor		13,929	41.7	
Nationalist		10,791	32.3	
Progressive		5,925	17.7	
Democratic		2,227	6.7	
Soldiers & Citizens		246	0.7	
Independent	Joseph Andrew	222	0.7	
Independent	Sydney Cook	70	0.2	

=== Elections in the 1910s ===
==== 1917 ====
1917 New South Wales state election: St George
Party	Candidate	Votes	%	±%
Nationalist	William Bagnall	7,414	64.9	+15.3
Labor	Arthur Dengate	4,010	35.1	−10.0
Total formal votes		11,424	99.2	+0.3
Informal votes		91	0.8	−0.3
Turnout		11,515	70.3	−4.5
Member changed to Nationalist from Labor				

The sitting member William Bagnall was expelled from Labor in the November 1916 Labor split over conscription.

==== 1913 ====
1913 New South Wales state election: St George
Party	Candidate	Votes	%	±%
Liberal Reform	William Wood	4,797	49.6	
Labor	William Bagnall	4,366	45.1	
National Progressive	Henry Broe	509	5.3	
Total formal votes		9,672	98.9	
Informal votes		110	1.1	
Turnout		9,782	74.8	
Second round result
Labor	William Bagnall	5,231	51.0	
Liberal Reform	William Wood	5,025	49.0	
Total formal votes		10,256	99.5	
Informal votes		46	0.5	
Turnout		10,302	78.8	
Labor gain from Liberal Reform				

==== 1910 ====
1910 New South Wales state election: St George
Party	Candidate	Votes	%	±%
Liberal Reform	William Taylor	6,198	58.5	
Labour	William Bagnall	4,396	41.5	
Total formal votes		10,594	98.9	
Informal votes		118	1.1	
Turnout		10,712	76.7	
Liberal Reform hold				

=== Elections in the 1900s ===
==== 1908 by-election ====
1908 St George by-election Wednesday 20 May
Party	Candidate	Votes	%	±%
Liberal Reform	William Taylor	4,077	62.9	−15.1
Labour	George Holt	2,391	36.9	+14.9
Independent	Charles Counsell	10	0.2	
Total formal votes		6,478	98.3	+1.4
Informal votes		111	1.7	−1.4
Turnout		6,589	62.4 (Note: estimate based on an electoral roll of 10,564 at the 1907 election.)	−4.6
Liberal Reform hold		Swing	−15.1	

Joseph Carruthers (Liberal Reform) resigned.

==== 1907 ====
1907 New South Wales state election: St George
Party	Candidate	Votes	%	±%
Liberal Reform	Sir Joseph Carruthers	5,345	78.0	
Labour	George Black	1,507	22.0	
Total formal votes		6,852	96.9	
Informal votes		220	3.1	
Turnout		7,072	66.9	
Liberal Reform hold				

==== 1904 ====
1904 New South Wales state election: St George
Party	Candidate	Votes	%	±%
Liberal Reform	Sir Joseph Carruthers	3,068	71.8	
Labour	William Paine	1,207	28.2	
Total formal votes		4,275	99.3	
Informal votes		30	0.7	
Turnout		4,305	51.6	
Liberal Reform hold				

St George lost part of the district to Canterbury.

==== 1901 ====
1901 New South Wales state election: St George
Party	Candidate	Votes	%	±%
Liberal Reform	Joseph Carruthers	1,519	69.2	−2.6
Labour	William Flinn	676	30.8	
Total formal votes		2,195	100.0	+0.8
Informal votes		0	0.0	−0.8
Turnout		2,195	53.2	−11.6
Liberal Reform hold				

=== Elections in the 1890s ===
==== 1898 ====
1898 New South Wales colonial election: St George
Party	Candidate	Votes	%	±%
Free Trade	Joseph Carruthers	1,522	71.8	
National Federal	George Waddell	594	28.0	
Independent	Francis Brown	4	0.2	
Total formal votes		2,120	99.3	
Informal votes		16	0.8	
Turnout		2,136	64.8	
Free Trade hold				

==== 1895 ====
1895 New South Wales colonial election: St George
Party	Candidate	Votes	%	±%
Free Trade	Joseph Carruthers	1,380	82.7	
Independent	William Taylor	289	17.3	
Total formal votes		1,669	99.2	
Informal votes		13	0.8	
Turnout		1,682	63.2	
Free Trade hold				

==== 1894 ====
1894 New South Wales colonial election: St George
Party	Candidate	Votes	%	±%
Free Trade	Joseph Carruthers	1,523	71.6	
Labour	Denis Acton	604	28.4	
Total formal votes		2,127	98.4	
Informal votes		34	1.6	
Turnout		2,161	80.5	
Free Trade win		(new seat)		
