= Electoral results for the district of Sydney-Pyrmont =

Election results for Sydney-Pyrmont, New South Wales, Australia

Sydney-Pyrmont, an electoral district of the Legislative Assembly in the Australian state of New South Wales, was created in 1894 and abolished in 1904.

Election	Member	Party
1894	Thomas Davis	Labour
1895	Thomas Davis	Labour
1898	Samuel Smith	Labour
1901	Samuel Smith	Labour
1902 by	John McNeill	Labour

== Election results ==
=== Elections in the 1900s ===
==== 1902 by-election ====
1902 Sydney-Pyrmont by-election Saturday 24 May
Party	Candidate	Votes	%	±%
Labour	John McNeill (elected)	875	68.2	−24.1
Independent Labour	Andrew Cochrane	370	28.8	
Progressive	Thomas Gollan	25	1.9	
Independent	John Behan	13	1.0	
Total formal votes		1,283	98.5	−0.3
Informal votes		19	1.5	+0.3
Turnout		1,302	55.3 (Note: based on a roll of 2,356 at the 1901 election.)	+8.4
Labour hold				

Sam Smith (Labour) resigned.

==== 1901 ====
1901 New South Wales state election: Sydney-Pyrmont
Party	Candidate	Votes	%	±%
Labour	Samuel Smith	1,008	92.3	+39.5
Independent Liberal	John Sergeant	84	7.7	
Total formal votes		1,092	98.8	−0.3
Informal votes		13	1.2	+0.3
Turnout		1,105	46.9	−11.8
Labour hold				

=== Elections in the 1890s ===
==== 1898 ====
1898 New South Wales colonial election: Sydney-Pyrmont
Party	Candidate	Votes	%	±%
Labour	Samuel Smith	616	52.8	
National Federal	Daniel O'Connor	383	32.8	
Independent	John Carter	152	13.0	
Ind. Free Trade	Frederick Marshall	16	1.4	
Total formal votes		1,167	99.2	
Informal votes		10	0.9	
Turnout		1,177	58.7	
Labour hold				

==== 1895 ====
1895 New South Wales colonial election: Sydney-Pyrmont
Party	Candidate	Votes	%	±%
Labour	Thomas Davis	477	47.6	
Ind. Free Trade	John Carter	374	37.3	
Ind. Protectionist	Cyrus Fuller	141	14.1	
Independent	Thomas Houghton	5	0.5	
Ind. Protectionist	George Perry	5	0.5	
Total formal votes		1,002	97.9	
Informal votes		22	2.2	
Turnout		1,024	59.4	
Labour hold				

==== 1894 ====
1894 New South Wales colonial election: Sydney-Pyrmont
Party	Candidate	Votes	%	±%
Labour	Thomas Davis	716	52.2	
Free Trade	John Carter	394	28.7	
Ind. Protectionist	Cyrus Fuller	197	14.4	
Ind. Free Trade	George Landers	64	4.7	
Total formal votes		1,371	98.6	
Informal votes		19	1.4	
Turnout		1,390	80.4	
Labour win		(new seat)		
