= 1913 New South Wales state election =

Election of the 23rd New South Wales Legislative Assembly

- 6 December 1913

All 90 seats in the New South Wales Legislative Assembly 46 Assembly seats were needed for a majority
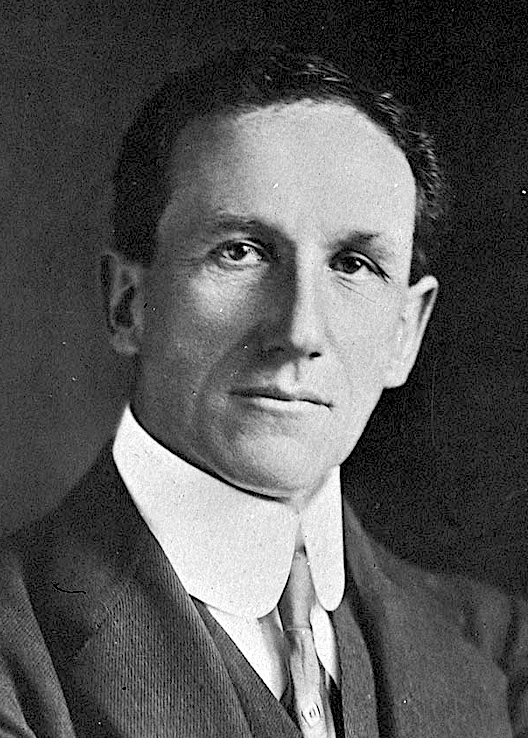

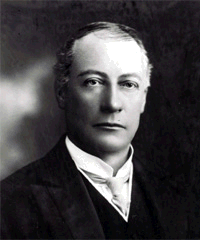

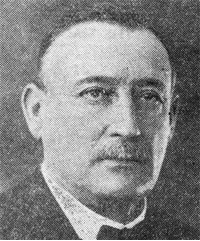
	First party	Second party	Third party
Leader	William Holman	Charles Wade	Walter Bennett
Party	Labor	Liberal/Farmers	Country
Leader since	30 June 1913	2 October 1907	1913
Leader's seat	Cootamundra	Gordon	None (contested Durham)
Last election	46 seats	37 seats	Did not exist
Seats won	49	38	1
Seat change	▲3	▲1	▲1
Popular vote	311,747	298,899	10,472
Percentage	46.63%	44.70%	1.57%
Swing	▼2.29	▲1.67	▲1.57
- Legislative Assembly after the election
Premier before election
William Holman
Labor
Subsequent Premier
William Holman
Labor

The 1913 New South Wales state election was held on 6 December 1913. This election was for all of the 90 seats in the 23rd New South Wales Legislative Assembly and it was conducted in single-member constituencies with a second ballot if a majority was not achieved on the first. The 22nd parliament of New South Wales was dissolved on 6 November 1913 by the Governor, Sir Gerald Strickland, on the advice of the Premier William Holman.

There was a redistribution in 1912 as a result of the removal of the Australian Capital Territory from the state New South Wales and population growth in the Sydney metropolitan area. Labor won 7 of the 12 second round ballots.

== Key dates ==
Date	Event
6 November 1913	The Legislative Assembly was dissolved, and writs were issued by the Governor to proceed with an election.
15 November 1913	Nominations for candidates for the election closed at noon.
6 December 1913	Polling day.
23 December 1913	Opening of 23rd Parliament.

== Results ==
New South Wales state election, 6 December 1913 Legislative Assembly << 1910–1917 >>
Enrolled voters	1,037,999				
Votes cast	668,601		Turnout	68.24	0.81
Informal votes	15,751		Informal	2.30	+0.50
Summary of votes by party
Party	Primary votes	%	Swing	Seats	Change
Labor	311,747	46.63	−2.29	49	+3
Liberal Reform	219,525	32.83	+10.2	28	-9
Farmers and Settlers (Note: Members of Farmers and Settlers were also endorsed by Liberal Reform.)	79,374	11.87	+11.16	10	+10
Independent Liberal	16,324	2.44	−3.42	0	−6
Independent	15,223	2.28	+1.58	1	0
Country Party Association	10,472	1.57	+1.57	1	+1
Independent Labor	9,225	1.38	+0.59	1	+1
Others	6,711	1.01	+1.01	0	-
Total	668,601			90	

Popular vote
Labor	46.63%
Liberal Reform	32.83%
Farmers	11.87%
Ind. Liberal	2.44%
Independent	2.28%
Country	1.57%
Ind. Labor	1.38%
Others	1.01%
Parliamentary seats
Labor	49
Liberal Reform	28
Farmers	10
Ind. Liberal	0
Independent	1
Country	1
Ind. Labor	1

== Changing seats ==
Seats changing hands
Seat	1910				Swing (Note: Swing is calculated using the Butler method, being the average of the 1913 winning party percentage-point gain and the 1910 losing party percentage-point loss. NA is used where one of the parties did not contest both elections.)	1913		
Seat	Party	Member	Note	Margin (Note: Margin is calculated as the difference in vote percentage between the successful party and the second party.)	Swing	Margin	Member	Party
Albury	Independent Liberal	Gordon McLaurin	Defeated	11.0	2.2	15.4	John Cusack (Note: Previously the member for the abolished district of Queanbeyan.)	Labor
Annandale	Liberal Reform	Albert Bruntnell	Defeated	2.4	3.4	9.2	Arthur Griffith (Note: Previously the member for Sturt.)	Labor
Ashburnham	Labor	John Lynch	Defeated	6.9	-3.2	0.6	Arthur Grimm	Farmers and Settlers
Bathurst	Liberal Reform	John Miller	Defeated as Farmers and Settlers	6.0	-2.8	0.4	Ernest Durack	Labor
Belubula	Liberal Reform	Thomas Waddell	District abolished. Won Lyndhurst as Farmers and Settlers					
Blayney	Labor	George Beeby	District abolished. Defeated for Waverley as National Progressive					
Bondi			New district		NA	31.4	James Macarthur-Onslow (Note: Previously the member for Waverley.)	Liberal Reform
Botany	Labor	Fred Page	Changed party	28.0	NA	20.4	Fred Page	Independent Labor
Broken Hill	Labor	John Cann	District abolished. Won Sturt					
Byron			New district		NA	15.1	John Perry (Note: Previously the member for the abolished district of The Richmond.)	Liberal Reform
Canterbury	Liberal Reform	Varney Parkes	Defeated for Hurstville	11.4	-1.2	9.0	Henry Peters	Labor
Cessnock			New district		NA	78.1	William Kearsley (Note: Previously the member for Northumberland.)	Labor
The Clyde	Liberal Reform	William Millard	District abolished. Won Bega					
Corowa	Liberal Reform	Richard Ball	Changed party	23.0	4.0	31.0	Richard Ball	Farmers and Settlers
The Darling	Labor	John Meehan	District abolished. Retired					
Deniliquin	Labor	Henry Peters	District abolished. Won Canterbury					
Drummoyne			New district		NA	17.8	George Richards	Liberal Reform
Dulwich Hill			New district		NA	20.9	Tom Hoskins	Liberal Reform
Durham	Liberal Reform	William Brown	Changed party	17.7	3.6	8.1	Richard Ball	Farmers and Settlers
Enmore			New district		NA	7.8	David Hall	Labor
Gloucester	Liberal Reform	Richard Price	Changed party	37.8	-2.4	33.1	Richard Price	Farmers and Settlers
Gough	Liberal Reform	Follett Thomas	Changed party	1.5	1.3	4.2	Follett Thomas	Farmers and Settlers
Granville	Liberal Reform	John Nobbs	Defeated	17.7	-7.0	3.8	Jack Lang	Labor
Gwydir	Labor	George Jones	Defeated	26.0	-8.2	9.6	John Crane	Farmers and Settlers
Hurstville			New district		NA	3.2	Sam Toombs	Labor
Lane Cove	Liberal Reform	David Fell	District abolished. Retired					
Lismore			New district		NA	11.0	George Nesbitt	Farmers and Settlers
Lyndhurst			New district		NA	2.2	Thomas Waddell (Note: Previously the member for the abolished district of Belubula.)	Farmers and Settlers
Maitland	Independent Liberal	John Gillies (Note: John Gillies (Independent Liberal) died in 1911. The by-election in October 1911 was won by Charles Nicholson (Liberal Reform) who retained the seat at the 1913 general election.)	Won by Liberal Reform at by-election.	27.8	NA	1.2	Charles Nicholson	Liberal Reform
Mosman			New district		NA	50.6	Percy Colquhoun	Liberal Reform
Northumberland	Labor	William Kearsley	District abolished. Won Cessnock					
Pyrmont	Labor	John McNeill	District abolished. Retired					
Queanbeyan	Labor	John Cusack	District abolished. Won Albury					
Raleigh	Independent Liberal	George Briner	Changed party	56.6	NA	18.2	George Briner	Country Party Association
Randwick	Independent Liberal	David Storey	Changed party	18.8	19.4	20.0	David Storey	Liberal Reform
The Richmond	Liberal Reform	John Perry	District abolished. Won Byron					
Rous	Liberal Reform	George Hindmarsh	District abolished. Retired					
Ryde			New district		NA	33.3	William Thompson	Liberal Reform
St George	Liberal Reform	William Taylor	Retired	17.0	9.5	2.0	William Bagnall	Labor
Sherbrooke	Liberal Reform	John Hunt	District abolished. Won Camden					
Tamworth	Independent Liberal	Robert Levien	Defeated	21.8	NA	2.0	Frank Chaffey	Farmers and Settlers
Upper Hunter	Liberal Reform	Henry Willis	Defeated as Independent Liberal	3.7	NA	8.6	Mac Abbott	Farmers and Settlers
Wagga Wagga			New district		NA	2.4	Walter Boston	Labor
Wallsend			New district		NA	70.2	John Estell (Note: Previously the member for the abolished district of Waratah.)	Labor
Waverley	Liberal Reform	James Macarthur-Onslow	Won Bondi	14.9	7.8	0.6	James Fingleton	Labor
Waratah	Labor	John Estell	District abolished. Won Wallsend					
Willoughby			New district		NA	3.2	Edward Larkin	Labor
Willyama			New district		NA	55.9	Jabez Wright	Labor
Wynyard	Independent Liberal	Robert Donaldson	District abolished. Defeated as Country Party Association for Yass					

== See also ==
- Candidates of the 1913 New South Wales state election
- Members of the New South Wales Legislative Assembly, 1913–1917
