= Electoral results for the district of Pyrmont =

Election results for Pyrmont, New South Wales, Australia

Pyrmont, an electoral district of the Legislative Assembly in the Australian state of New South Wales, was created in 1904 and abolished in 1913.

Member	Party	Term
1904	John McNeill	Labor
1907	John McNeill	Labor
1910	John McNeill	Labor

== Election results ==
=== Elections in the 1910s ===
==== 1910 ====
1910 New South Wales state election: Pyrmont
Party	Candidate	Votes	%	±%
Labour	John McNeill	3,179	76.2	
Liberal Reform	John Sutton	639	15.3	
Social Democrat	William McCristal	354	8.5	
Total formal votes		4,179	97.2	
Informal votes		122	2.8	
Turnout		4,294	60.4	
Labour hold				

=== Elections in the 1900s ===
==== 1907 ====
1907 New South Wales state election: Pyrmont
Party	Candidate	Votes	%	±%
Labour	John McNeill	2,734	65.3	
Liberal Reform	Percy Stevens	1,454	34.7	
Total formal votes		4,188	95.5	
Informal votes		198	4.5	
Turnout		4,386	62.0	
Labour hold				

==== 1904 ====
1904 New South Wales state election: Pyrmont
Party	Candidate	Votes	%	±%
Labour	John McNeill	2,606	57.9	
Liberal Reform	John Harris	1,666	37.0	
Progressive	James Beer	169	3.8	
Socialist Labor	James Moroney	49	1.1	
Independent	Thomas Gollan	8	0.2	
Total formal votes		4,498	98.9	
Informal votes		52	1.1	
Turnout		4,550	54.8	
Labour win		(new seat)		

Pyrmont was a new seat and consisted of the abolished seat of Sydney-Pyrmont and part of the abolished seat of Sydney-Denison. The member for Sydney-Pyrmont was John McNeill (Labour). The member for Sydney-Denison was Andrew Kelly who successfully contested The Lachlan.
