= 1939 Hurstville state by-election =

Election result for Hurstville, New South Wales, Australia

The 1939 Hurstville state by-election was held on 18 March 1939 for the New South Wales Legislative Assembly electorate of Hurstville because of the death of James Webb (United Australia).

== Dates ==
Date	Event
14 February 1939	Death of James Webb.
24 February 1939	Writ of election issued by the Speaker of the Legislative Assembly.
3 March 1939	Nominations
18 March 1939	Polling day
31 March 1939	Return of writ

== Result ==
1939 Hurstville by-election Saturday 18 March
Party	Candidate	Votes	%	±%
Industrial Labor	Clive Evatt	7,017	33.8	
United Australia	Alfred Thomas	7,925	38.1	−18.0
Labor	John McGrath	5,852	28.1	−15.8
Total formal votes		20,794	98.5	+0.6
Informal votes		309	1.5	−0.6
Turnout		21,103	93.9	−3.2
Two-party-preferred result
Industrial Labor	Clive Evatt	12,168	58.5	
United Australia	Alfred Thomas	8,626	41.5	−14.6
Industrial Labor gain from United Australia		Swing	N/A	

== See also ==
- Electoral results for the district of Hurstville
- List of New South Wales state by-elections
