= 1908 St George state by-election =

Election result for St George, New South Wales, Australia

A by-election was held for the New South Wales Legislative Assembly electorate of St George on 20 May 1908. The by-election was triggered by the resignation of former Premier Joseph Carruthers (Liberal Reform).

== Dates ==
Date	Event
22 April 1908	Joseph Carruthers resigned.
23 April 1908	Writ of election issued by the Speaker of the Legislative Assembly.
13 May 1908	Nominations
20 May 1908	Polling day
3 June 1908	Return of writ

== Results ==
1908 St George by-election Wednesday 20 May
Party	Candidate	Votes	%	±%
Liberal Reform	William Taylor	4,077	62.9	−15.1
Labour	George Holt	2,391	36.9	+14.9
Independent	Charles Counsell	10	0.2	
Total formal votes		6,478	98.3	+1.4
Informal votes		111	1.7	−1.4
Turnout		6,589	62.4 (Note: estimate based on an electoral roll of 10,564 at the 1907 election.)	−4.6
Liberal Reform hold		Swing	−15.1	

== See also ==
- Electoral results for the district of St George
- List of New South Wales state by-elections
