= 1902 Sydney-Pyrmont state by-election =

Election result for Sydney-Pyrmont, New South Wales, Australia

A by-election was held for the New South Wales Legislative Assembly electorate of Sydney-Pyrmont on 24 May 1902 because of the resignation of Sam Smith (Labour) to accept an appointment to the Court of Arbitration.

== Dates ==
Date	Event
26 March 1902	Sam Smith appointed to the Court of Arbitration on the recommendation of the Industrial Unions of Employees.
30 March 1902	Sam Smith resigned.
3 May 1902	Writ of election issued by the Speaker of the Legislative Assembly.
14 May 1902	Nominations
24 May 1902	Polling day
31 May 1902	Return of writ

== Result ==
1902 Sydney-Pyrmont by-election Saturday 24 May
Party	Candidate	Votes	%	±%
Labour	John McNeill (elected)	875	68.2	−24.1
Independent Labour	Andrew Cochrane	370	28.8	
Progressive	Thomas Gollan	25	1.9	
Independent	John Behan	13	1.0	
Total formal votes		1,283	98.5	−0.3
Informal votes		19	1.5	+0.3
Turnout		1,302	55.3 (Note: based on a roll of 2,356 at the 1901 election.)	+8.4
Labour hold				

== See also ==
- Electoral results for the district of Sydney-Pyrmont
- List of New South Wales state by-elections
