= Walter Butler (Australian politician) =

Australian politician

Walter James Butler (15 April 1892 – 5 November 1937) was an Australian politician. He served in the Australian Infantry Forces as a private, from 1915 to 1919. He was elected as a Labor Party member for the New South Wales Legislative Assembly seat of Hurstville from 1927 to 1932.

New South Wales Legislative Assembly
New seat	Member for Hurstville; 1927–1932	Succeeded by James Webb
