= Thomas Davis (Australian politician) =

Australian politician

Thomas Martin Davis
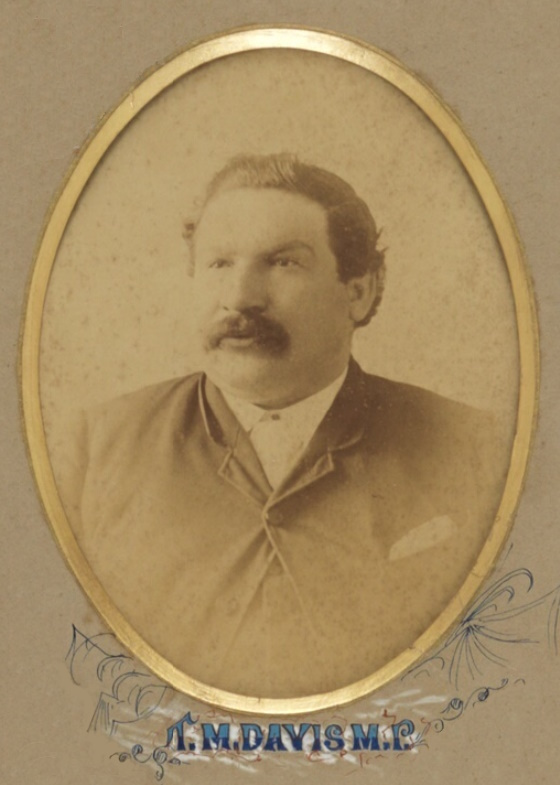

Member for West Sydney (NSW Legislative Assembly)
- In office 17 June 1891 – 25 June 1894

Member for Sydney-Pyrmont (NSW Legislative Assembly)
- In office 17 July 1894 – 05 July 1895

Member for Sydney-Pyrmont (NSW Legislative Assembly)
- In office 24 July 1895 – 08 July 1898

Personal details
- Born: 22 January 1856 Bromsgrove, Worcestershire
- Died: 14 July 1899 (aged 43) Sydney, New South Wales
- Spouse: Jessie Shaw
- Parents: Thomas Davis (father); Ann (née Martin) (mother)

Thomas Martin Davis (22 January 1856 – 14 July 1899) was an English-born Australian politician and union official.

Davis was an experienced seaman and dedicated unionist when he settled in Sydney in the mid-1880s. In August 1886 he was elected to the role of secretary of the Federated Seamen's Union and had a leading role during the 1890 maritime strike.

In June 1891 Davis was amongst the initial group of Labor Party members elected to the New South Wales Legislative Assembly. He was one of four Labor members representing the electorate of West Sydney from 1891 to June 1894. He then served two terms as the member for Sydney-Pyrmont, before retiring due to ill health in July 1898. Davis was appointed party whip in 1891 and consistently supported party solidarity and pledges by Labor members of parliament to vote according to caucus decisions.

== Biography ==
=== Early years ===
Thomas Martin Davis was born on 22 January 1856 at Bromsgrove in county Worcestershire, the sixth-born and only son of Thomas Davis and Ann (née Martin). His father was a fruit merchant. In 1859 the family moved to Glasgow where Thomas' father carried on business as an importer of fruit.

Young Thomas was educated in Glasgow, attending Glasgow High School and the Garnet Bank Academy in his later years. In 1869, aged thirteen, he was "sent to finish his education in the south of France". In about July 1870, at the outbreak of the Franco-Prussian war, he returned to Britain, where he decided to become a seaman and was apprenticed to the mercantile marine.

=== A varied experience ===
In about 1872 Davis deserted from his ship at a New Zealand port, after which he worked "for a couple of years... at all sorts of bush labor in the South Island".

Davis returned to Britain in 1874 and was employed as a seaman in the Atlantic trade, on vessels sailing between Liverpool and New York.

Thomas Davis arrived in Sydney on 2 October 1876, as a seaman aboard the newly-built steamship City of Grafton, constructed in Glasgow for the Clarence and Richmond River Steam Navigation Company and intended for the coastal trade between Sydney and the Clarence River. The City of Grafton had left Glasgow on 22 July and took on coal at Malta, Port Said at the northern mouth of the Suez Canal, and Galle in Ceylon. In Sydney Davis joined the Sydney Seamen's Union that had been formed in 1874. For several years afterwards he was employed on vessels engaged in intercolonial trade along the Australian coastline.

Davis returned to England in 1878. In 1879 he left England on a ship conveying troops to South Africa as reinforcements for the British war against the Zulu kingdom. At the Cape of Good Hope Davis and several of his fellow seamen left the vessel and enlisted in Captain Lonsdale's Mounted Rifles (also known as Lonsdale's Horse). Davis' duties including reconnoitering and guarding convoys, during which he was involved in many hostile encounters with Zulu warriors.

After Lonsdale's Mounted Rifles was disbanded Davis returned to Glasgow. Later he sailed to India, arriving at the port of Bombay. He found employment in India, engaged in railway construction. For four months he worked as a fireman-stoker on the railways, after which he was appointed as an inspector of construction on a military line across the Sibi desert to Kandahar in southern Afghanistan. Davis eventually left his employment on the Indian railways due to the extremity of climate.

By 1881 Davis had returned to Sydney and was engaged on a steamer trading to New Caledonia. Possessing French language skills, he was employed as an interpreter to the government in New Caledonia. He resided there for several years and was also appointed as an inspector of mines. During his period in New Caledonia Davis injured his knee which caused a permanent "slight peculiarity of gait". In December 1882 Davis was aboard the steamship John Higginson, proceeding to Thio in the South Province of New Caledonia, when the vessel struck a reef and those on board took to the lifeboats before it sank.

Davis returned to Sydney in 1883 and was employed as a seaman aboard the P. and O. steamer R.M.S. Shannon. The vessel carried passengers, mail and cargo between Australian ports and London.

By mid-year 1885 Davis was a crew member of the steam-ship Governor Blackall, under the command of Captain T. A. Lake. The vessel was chartered to convey Sir Peter Scratchley, who had been appointed special commissioner for new British protectorate of New Guinea, on his first tour of inspection of the territory after arriving at Port Moresby on 29 August 1885. With the absence of an official residence, the Governor Blackall was used as a base and a means of travel to locations away from the colonial capital. Scratchley died of malaria on board the vessel on 2 December 1885, as it returned to Australia.

After returning to Sydney Davis was employed aboard the steamer S.S. Cintra, remaining with that vessel until June 1886.

=== Union activities ===
By July 1886 Davis was acting secretary of the New South Wales branch of the Federated Seamen's Union and at a meeting the following month he was elected to the role of secretary. Davis was also active in the local Maritime Council. In 1886 he attended a conference of shipowners and trade unionists which attempted, unsuccessfully, to address the growing problems of wages and conditions in the shipping industry.

Davis had an important role in the events that preceded the 1890 maritime strike. He was a member of the Labour Defence Committee which directed the dispute in New South Wales and also the Intercolonial Labour Conference which sought to control the dispute Australia-wide.

In November 1890 the New South Wales government appointed a royal commission "to inquire into the causes of and the best means calculated to prevent strikes". Davis was one of the sixteen commission members, which included representatives of unionists and employers. The 'Royal Commission on Strikes' held its first meeting in early December 1890 and concluded its hearings in mid-May 1891.^{[A]}

Davis remained secretary of the Seamen's Union until August 1891, resigning from the position after being elected to parliament.

=== Political career ===
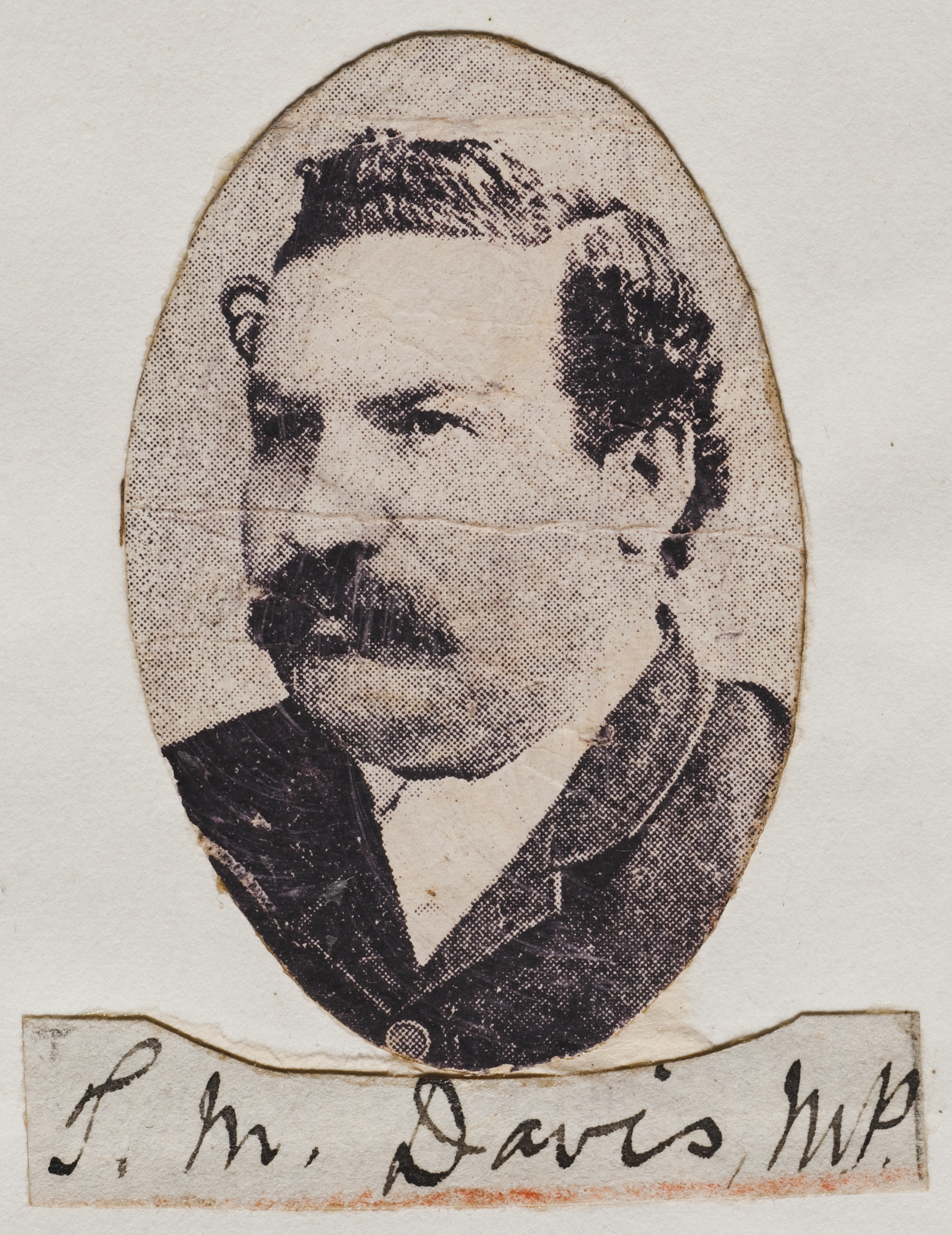
Thomas Martin Davis (M.P.), photographed in about 1898.

In April 1891 Davis was a foundation member of the West Sydney Labor Electoral League. The 1891 general election in New South Wales, held in June and early July 1891, saw the first electoral successes of the Labor Party (then known as the Labor Electoral League of New South Wales). The local Labor Electoral League nominated four candidates for the four-member West Sydney electorate in the New South Wales Legislative Assembly. As well as Davis, the nominees were John D. FitzGerald, George Black and Andrew J. Kelly.

On 15 June the four Labor candidates for West Sydney addressed a public meeting. During his speech Davis outlined Labor's approach to politics, to form a disciplined third party as a voting bloc, between government and opposition, to guide needed reforms through parliament. He explained that the Labor candidates had signed a pledge that, if elected, "they would retire on being called upon to do so by two-thirds of the electors". Davis added: "Nobody else had signed such a pledge as they had and... none [except Labor men] were prepared to occupy their true position in Parliament, the cross-benches". During his speech Davis condemned the Merchant Shipping Act and its regulatory agency, the Marine Board, claiming "it was not constituted in the interest of life, but of property".

The four Labor League candidates contested the election for the West Sydney seats against four Free Trade Party candidates (three of whom had been sitting members) and one representing the Protectionist Party. The poll, held on 17 June 1891, resulted in the election of all four Labor Party candidates. FitzGerald, Black and Kelly each attracted about fifteen percent of the votes. Davis was elected in fourth place, having received 2,730 votes (10.3 percent).

At a meeting of the Labor party caucus, held at parliament house on 29 July 1891, Davis was appointed as the party whip. Davis remained a supporter of party solidarity and was one of the few Labor Party members elected in 1891 that remained loyal to conference decisions and the various manifestations of party pledges to vote according to caucus decisions.

In September 1893 the Electoral Districts Commissioners presented their scheme of redistribution of seats under the new Electoral Act before the New South Wales Legislative Assembly. As part of the process, multi-member electorates were abolished and the electorates were realigned and in some cases renamed. The West Sydney electorate was split into the single-member electorates of Sydney-Gipps, Sydney-Lang, Sydney-Denison and Sydney-Pyrmont.

Thomas Davis and Jessie Shaw were married on 9 May 1892 in the St. Barnabas Anglican Church in Sydney. The couple had three sons, born from 1893 to 1897.

For the 1894 general election in New South Wales, Davis was nominated as the Labor Party candidate for the Sydney-Pyrmont electorate, one of the single member constituencies split from the West Sydney electorate. In the poll held on 14 July 1894 against a Free Trade Party representative and two independent candidates, Davis was returned as a member of parliament with 52.2 percent of the vote.

At the 1895 general election, held on 20 July 1895, Davis was returned as the Labor member for Sydney-Pyrmont with 47.6 percent of the vote against four independent candidates. In parliament Davis maintained a focus on shipping problems, in efforts to improve working conditions and also to modernise the industry. In July 1897 he gave evidence to the Royal Commission in inquire into the management of the Marine Board of New South Wales.

=== Final years ===
Davis retired from parliament due to ill health at the end of his term in July 1898. In July 1898 Davis became the licensee of the Cliff House Hotel at Bondi.

Thomas Davis died on 14 July 1899 at his residence in Arthur Street, Ashfield, a suburb in Sydney's inner west. The cause of his death was recorded as "failure of the heart's action owing to fatty degeneration". He was buried in the Anglican section of Waverley Cemetery.

== Notes ==
A.The published report of the Royal Commission on Strikes was tabled in parliament in November 1891.

New South Wales Legislative Assembly
Preceded by Francis Abigail; Daniel O'Connor; Thomas Playfair; Adolphus Taylor	Member for West Sydney; 1891–1894; Served alongside: George Black, Jack FitzGerald, Andrew Kelly	Abolished
New title	Member for Sydney-Pyrmont; 1894–1898	Succeeded by Samuel Smith
