= Guy Yeomans =

Australian politician

Guy Andrew Yeomans (born 5 November 1954), is a former Australian politician. He was the Liberal member for Hurstville in the New South Wales Legislative Assembly from 1984 to 1991.

Yeomans was born in Sydney and attended Sydney Technical High School and then the University of Sydney, where he received a Bachelor of Arts and a Diploma of Education, majoring in government, history and English. He was a high school teacher from 1977 to 1984.

In 1984, Yeomans was selected as the Liberal candidate to challenge state Labor MP Kevin Ryan in the seat of Hurstville, winning by 531 votes. He was re-elected in 1988 (defeating future federal Attorney-General Robert McClelland). Following the 1991 redistribution, however, Hurstville became a notionally Labor seat. Yeomans contested preselection for the safer seat of Georges River which contained a majority of those who voted for him under his old seat, but was defeated by sitting MP Terry Griffiths. Since Hurstville was being contested by Earlwood MP Phil White, whose seat had been abolished, Yeomans retired from politics. He went on to a career in Public Relations and the CEO of Sydney Anglican Schools.

In 1996, Yeomans completed a Graduate Diploma in Christian Studies at the New South Wales Baptist Theological College, and in 2000 completed a course in spiritual direction at the Jesuit Center for Spiritual Growth, Pennsylvania. Since then he has ministered as a spiritual director with Jesuit and Ignatian Spirituality Australia. In 2004 he received his master's degree in Christian Spirituality and married Sandra. They have two children. He became a Baptist Pastor in 2005 serving at St Ives, then moving to UK in 2016 to minister there with the Baptist Church.

New South Wales Legislative Assembly
| Preceded by Kevin Ryan | Member for Hurstville; 1984–1991 | Succeeded by Morris Iemma |
