= Electoral district of Sydney-Pyrmont =

Former state electoral district of New South Wales, Australia

Sydney-Pyrmont was an electoral district of the Legislative Assembly in the Australian state of New South Wales, created in 1894, partly replacing the multi-member electorate of West Sydney. It was named after and included the Sydney suburb of Pyrmont, consisting of the entire peninsula north of Fig Street and east of Wattle Street. In 1904, it was largely replaced by Pyrmont, which also absorbed part of the abolished district of Sydney-Denison.

== Members for Sydney-Pyrmont ==
Member	Party	Term
Thomas Davis	Labour	1894–1898
Samuel Smith	Labour	1898–1902
John McNeill	Labour	1902–1904

== Election results ==
1902 Sydney-Pyrmont by-election Saturday 24 May
Party	Candidate	Votes	%	±%
Labour	John McNeill (elected)	875	68.2	−24.1
Independent Labour	Andrew Cochrane	370	28.8	
Progressive	Thomas Gollan	25	1.9	
Independent	John Behan	13	1.0	
Total formal votes		1,283	98.5	−0.3
Informal votes		19	1.5	+0.3
Turnout		1,302	55.3 (Note: based on a roll of 2,356 at the 1901 election.)	+8.4
Labour hold				

Sam Smith (Labour) resigned.
