= James Webb (Australian politician) =

Australian politician

James Eli Webb (21 September 1887 – 14 February 1939) was an Australian politician.

Webb represented the seat of Hurstville in the New South Wales Legislative Assembly from 1932 to 1939 for the United Australia Party. He attended Sydney Boys High School. He died at a private hospital in Bexley on 14 February 1939 following an abdominal operation.

== Notes ==
Civic offices
Preceded by Sydney Hall Binder	Mayor of Hurstville; 1926–1927	Succeeded by Ernest Albert Field
New South Wales Legislative Assembly
Preceded by Walter Butler	Member for Hurstville; 1932–1939	Succeeded by Clive Evatt
