= John Kilburn =

Australian politician

John George Kilburn (2 July 1876 – 2 April 1976) was an English-born Australian politician.

He was born in Middlesbrough in Yorkshire to bricklayer George Kilburn and Ellen Horner. In January 1898 he married Elizabeth McNamara, with whom he had four children. He migrated to New South Wales in 1912 and followed his father's trade; he was also a member of the Australian Socialist Party until 1917 and was involved in attempts to form a Marxist party in 1919. In 1922 he joined the Labor Party, and served on the central executive from 1923 to 1924. In 1924 he became secretary of the Bricklayers' Union. He was a Labor member of the New South Wales Legislative Council from 1931 to 1934. He remained union secretary until 1943, and was also on the Labor central executive from 1938 to 1939 and from 1940 to 1941. Kilburn died at Hammondville in 1976, three months short of his hundredth birthday.
