= Clive Evatt =

Australian politician (1900–1984)

The Honourable Clive Evatt QC

Member of the New South Wales Parliament for Hurstville
- In office 18 March 1939 – 16 February 1959
- Preceded by: James Webb
- Succeeded by: Bill Rigby

Personal details
- Born: 6 June 1900 East Maitland, Colony of New South Wales
- Died: 15 September 1984 (aged 84) Darlinghurst, New South Wales, Australia
- Party: Labor Party
- Other political affiliations: Industrial Labor Party; Independent
- Spouse: Marjorie Andreas
- Relations: H. V. Evatt (brother); Sir George Evatt (uncle)
- Children: Elizabeth Evatt; Penelope Seidler; Clive Evatt, jnr
- Education: RMC, Duntroon; University of Sydney

Military service
- Allegiance: Australia
- Branch/service: Australian Army
- Years of service: c. 1918–1922
- Rank: Lieutenant

Clive Raleigh Evatt QC (6 June 1900 – 15 September 1984) was an Australian politician, barrister and raconteur. He was a member of the New South Wales Legislative Assembly from 1939 until 1959. At various times he sat as a member of the Industrial Labor Party, Labor Party and as an independent.

== Early life ==
Clive Raleigh Evatt was born in East Maitland, the son of an immigrant publican who died when Evatt was one year old. His middle name was given in honour of his first cousin Raleigh Evatt, the son of his uncle Major-General Sir George Evatt. One of eight brothers, including H. V. Evatt, he was educated at Fort Street Boys' High School.

Evatt's family prevented him from enlisting in the First AIF, but allowed him to enroll in the Royal Military College, Duntroon from which he graduated as a lieutenant in 1921. He resigned from the army the following year to study law at the University of Sydney. While at university, he played Rugby league for University and New South Wales, and was the editor for Undergraduate journal Hermes. Evatt graduated and was admitted to the New South Wales Bar in 1926.

He married Marjorie Andreas, the daughter of Harry Andreas of Leuralla, in 1928 and they had three children: Elizabeth Evatt AC; Penelope Seidler AM and defamation barrister Clive Evatt Jnr. In 1940 the Evatt family built Evatt House in Wahroonga, their home until the death of Clive and Marjorie Evatt in 1984.

Evatt's career as a barrister advanced rapidly and he was appointed a King's Counsel in 1935. He specialized in Workers' Compensation cases but also appeared in criminal cases, most notably in the Shark Arm case, where he successfully defended Patrick Brady.

== Political career ==
In March 1939 he successfully contested the by-election caused by the death of James Webb, the member for Hurstville in the Legislative Assembly. Evatt had been endorsed by the Industrial Labor Party of Bob Heffron and defeated a candidate of the Australian Labor Party (NSW) supported by Jack Lang. This and a subsequent defeat at a by-election in Waverley signalled the end of Lang's term as Leader of the Australian Labor Party in New South Wales. The Industrial Labor Party was dissolved and Evatt was admitted to the Labor Party caucus when Lang was replaced as Labor leader by William McKell who subsequently led the ALP to victory at the 1941 election.

Evatt served in the governments of William McKell, James McGirr and Joseph Cahill as Minister for Education (1941–1944), Minister in Charge of Tourist Activities and Immigration (1946–1947), Minister for Housing (1947–1950 and 1952–1954) and Chief Secretary (1950–1952). As Housing minister, Evatt presided over the significant expansion of public housing administered by the Housing Commission and initiated various schemes of slum clearance in inner Sydney, such as in Redfern.

Tensions within the New South Wales branch of the Australian Labor Party leading up to the 1950s party split led to Cahill forcing Evatt from the cabinet. Evatt was expelled from the Labor Party on 13 July 1956 after he voted in parliament against a caucus decision to increase tram fares. He fought the subsequent election as an independent Labor candidate but he was defeated by the endorsed ALP candidate Bill Rigby, his former private secretary, whom he would later also represent in a defamation case.

== Life after politics ==
After leaving politics Evatt continued to work as a barrister with a large Worker's Compensation and defamation practice.

He died at Darlinghurst on 15 September 1984, survived by his three children. His son was also named Clive and was also a well-known defamation barrister.

New South Wales Legislative Assembly
Preceded by James Webb	Member for Hurstville; 1939 – 1959	Succeeded by Bill Rigby
Political offices
Preceded by David Drummond	Minister for Education; 1941 – 1944	Succeeded by Robert Heffron
New office	Minister in Charge of Tourist Activities and Immigration; 1946 – 1947	Succeeded by Frank Finnan
Preceded by James McGirr	Minister for Housing; 1947 – 1950	Succeeded by Gus Kelly
Vacant Title last held by Eric Spooner	Assistant Treasurer; 1947 – 1953	Vacant Title next held by George Freudenstein
Preceded by James McGirr	Chief Secretary of New South Wales; 1947 – 1950	Succeeded by Gus Kelly
Preceded by Clarrie Martin	Minister for Co-operative Societies; 1950 – 1954	Succeeded by Gus Kelly
Preceded by Claude Matthews	Minister for Housing; 1952 – 1954	Succeeded by Gus Kelly
