= Sam Smith (Australian politician) =

Politician and union official from New South Wales, Australia

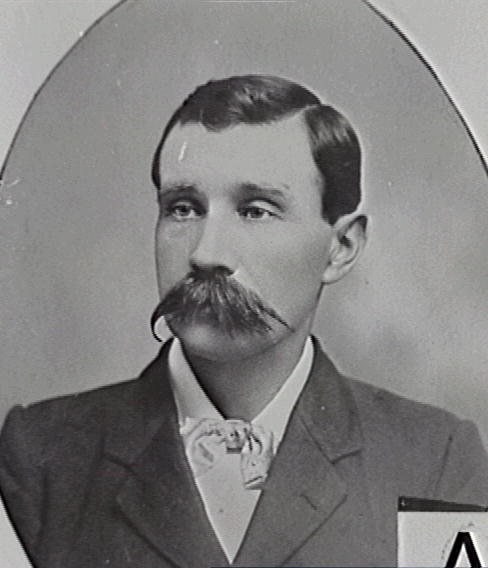
Samuel Smith, Alderman Municipal Council of the City of Sydney, circa 1901

Samuel "Sam" Smith (1857 – 22 January 1916) was an Australian union official and politician.

Smith's early life is unclear in that his parliamentary biography states he was born on 17 February 1857 in Ayrshire, Scotland, to Samuel Smith and Marion Hunter, while the City of Sydney Archives states that he was born on 29 January 1857 in Glasgow, to Elizabeth née Hunter and David Smith, shoemaker.

He attended school at Kilwinning and became a colliery lad at the age of eleven, becoming active in the Glasgow Railway and Seaman's Union. In 1882 he arrived in Sydney and helped found the local Seamen's Union, of which he was assistant secretary in 1890 and secretary from 1891 to 1902. He was a member of the Loyal United Brothers lodge of the Grand United Order of Odd Fellows.

He was elected to the New South Wales Legislative Assembly as the member for Sydney-Pyrmont and the 1898 election and was re-elected at the 1901 election, serving until his resignation in 1902. He was a Sydney City Councillor from 1900 to 1902.

In March 1902 Smith was appointed to the Court of Arbitration on the recommendation of the Industrial Unions of Employees. He was re-elected for a further term in April 1905, however a temporary replacement was appointed in September, and in around November 1905 he was committed to the Hospital for the Insane at Callan Park.

Smith died at Lilyfield on 22 January 1916 (aged 58).

New South Wales Legislative Assembly
Preceded by Thomas Davis	Member for Sydney-Pyrmont; 1898–1902	Succeeded by John McNeill
