= Country Party Association =

Defunct agrarian party in Australia

The Country Party Association was an early attempt to establish an agrarian party in New South Wales. It was formed in 1913 as a reaction against the Farmers' and Settlers' Association of New South Wales's policy of co-operation and joint endorsement with the Liberal Reform Party. It elected one member at the 1913 state election, George Briner (a sitting independent), but he soon joined the Liberals and the Country Party Association faded.

The president of the association was Walter Bennett, a local politician who had served as member for Durham until 1907.
