= Electoral district of Pyrmont =

Former state electoral district of New South Wales, Australia

Pyrmont was an electoral district of the Legislative Assembly in the Australian state of New South Wales that was created in the 1904 re-distribution of electorates following the 1903 New South Wales referendum, which required the number of members of the Legislative Assembly to be reduced from 125 to 90. It consisted of the abolished seat of Sydney-Pyrmont and part of the abolished seat of Sydney-Denison and included the Sydney suburb of Pyrmont. It was abolished in 1913 and the district re-distributed to Belmore, Darling Harbour and Phillip.

== Members for Pyrmont ==
Member	Party	Term
John McNeill	Labor	1904–1913

== Election results ==
1910 New South Wales state election: Pyrmont
Party	Candidate	Votes	%	±%
Labour	John McNeill	3,179	76.2	
Liberal Reform	John Sutton	639	15.3	
Social Democrat	William McCristal	354	8.5	
Total formal votes		4,179	97.2	
Informal votes		122	2.8	
Turnout		4,294	60.4	
Labour hold				
