= William Taylor (New South Wales politician, born 1862) =

Australian politician

William Taylor (1862 – 15 February 1922) was an Australian politician.

He was born at Bay of Biscay in Victoria to merchant James Taylor and Elizabeth Park. Educated at Ballarat, he left school at fourteen and entered the product merchandise trade. He married Elizabeth Laverick at Ballarat around 1884; they had two daughters. He moved to Sydney in 1884, where he opened a branch of the firm he worked for, John Gray and Sons. He was a Rockdale alderman from 1890 to 1922, serving as mayor from 1892 to 1894 and from 1904 to 1909. In 1908 he was elected to the New South Wales Legislative Assembly as the Liberal member for St George, serving until his retirement in 1913. Taylor died in Sydney in 1922.

New South Wales Legislative Assembly
Preceded by Sir Joseph Carruthers	Member for St George; 1908–1913	Succeeded by William Bagnall
