= Walter Boston =

Australian politician

Walter James Boston (22 April 1874 – 30 December 1968) was an Australian politician.

He was born at Adelong, New South Wales, to Daniel Boston, a wheelwright and coachbuilder, and Eliza Berryman. He attended the local public school before entering the family coachmaking firm, Boston Brothers. On 14 May 1896 he married May Smith; they would have seven children. Boston was also a local agent for the Australian Workers' Union, and in 1913 he was elected to the New South Wales Legislative Assembly as the Labor member for Wagga Wagga. He lost the seat in 1917. Boston died at Randwick in 1968.

New South Wales Legislative Assembly
New seat	Member for Wagga Wagga; 1913–1917	Succeeded by George Beeby
