= Electoral district of Hurstville =

Former state electoral district of New South Wales, Australia

Hurstville was an electoral district of the Legislative Assembly in the Australian state of New South Wales, named after and including the Sydney suburb of Hurstville.

It was first established prior to the 1913 state election. It was abolished in 1920, with the introduction of proportional representation and absorbed into St George. It was recreated in 1927 and dissolved in a distribution prior to the 1999 state election. Between 1991 and 1999 it was held by Morris Iemma who went on to become Premier of New South Wales in August 2005.

== Members for Hurstville ==
First incarnation (1913–1920)
Member	Party	Term
Sam Toombs	Labor	1913–1917
Thomas Ley	Nationalist	1917–1920
Second incarnation (1927–1999)
Member	Party	Term
Walter Butler	Labor	1927–1932
James Webb	United Australia	1932–1939
Clive Evatt	Industrial Labor	1939
Clive Evatt	Labor	1939–1956
Clive Evatt	Independent	1956–1959
Bill Rigby	Labor	1959–1965
Tom Mead	Liberal	1965–1976
Kevin Ryan	Labor	1976–1984
Guy Yeomans	Liberal	1984–1991
Morris Iemma	Labor	1991–1999

== Election results ==
1995 New South Wales state election: Hurstville
Party	Candidate	Votes	%	±%
Labor	Morris Iemma	18,771	57.1	+8.3
Liberal	Mick Frawley	12,759	38.8	−3.3
Independent	Saad Turk	1,369	4.2	+4.2
Total formal votes		32,899	93.6	+4.9
Informal votes		2,240	6.4	−4.9
Turnout		35,139	94.3	
Two-party-preferred result
Labor	Morris Iemma	19,410	59.6	+5.0
Liberal	Mick Frawley	13,131	40.4	−5.0
Labor hold		Swing	+5.0	
