= John McNeill (New South Wales politician) =

Australian politician

John McNeill (1872 – 4 June 1916) was a Scottish-born Australian politician.

His parents were commercial traveller John McNeill and Anne McKenzie. He arrived in New South Wales in 1888 and became a patternmaker, working for the Railways Department. In 1893 he married Mary O'Brien; they would have five children. He later worked as a publican. In 1902 he was elected to the New South Wales Legislative Assembly as the Labor member for Sydney-Pyrmont, transferring to Pyrmont in 1904. He served until his retirement in 1913, and died in 1916 at Hurstville.

New South Wales Legislative Assembly
Preceded by Samuel Smith	Member for Sydney-Pyrmont; 1902–1904	Abolished
New seat	Member for Pyrmont; 1904–1913	Abolished
