= William Bagnall =

Australian politician

William Roy Clifford Bagnall (10 April 1882 – 28 May 1950) was a New Zealand-born Australian politician.

He was born at Turua to sawmill owner Albert Edward Bagnall and Emma, née Brent. He moved to Sydney in 1903, where he immediately became involved in the union movement, being the first secretary and a foundation delegate of the Labor Council of New South Wales, representing the Process Engravers' Union (Printing Trades Federation Council from 1909). Around 1907 he married Ruby Fitzgerald at Enmore, with whom he had five children. He worked as a process engraver during this period. In 1913 he was elected to the New South Wales Legislative Assembly as the Labor member for St George. In the 1917 split Bagnall, a supporter of conscription, joined the Nationalist Party. He continued to represent St George with the introduction of proportional representation in 1920, but he was defeated in 1925; five months later he returned to the Assembly to fill the vacancy caused by Thomas Ley's resignation. He left the Assembly in 1927 and managed Hoyts theatre from 1927 to 1944. Bagnall died at Mosman in 1950.

New South Wales Legislative Assembly
Preceded by William Taylor	Member for St George; 1913–1925; Served alongside: None; Arkins, Cann, Gosling, Ley	Succeeded by Joseph Cahill
Preceded by Thomas Ley	Member for St George; 1925–1927; Served alongside: Arkins, Cahill, Cann, Gosling	Succeeded by Joseph Cahill
