= Sam Toombs =

Australian politician

Captain Samuel Toombs JP (26 March 1871 – 17 November 1949) was a seaman and an Australian politician, elected as a member of the New South Wales Legislative Assembly representing the seat of Hurstville.

He was born in Plymouth, England as where he spent his childhood and school years. Samuel followed his father, Samuel Toombs Senior, with service in the Royal Navy in England.

Samuel Jr. migrated to Australia, arriving in New South Wales in 1891. He continued his military career with the Royal Australian Navy, where he attained the rank of Captain.

Toombs married Mary Jane Gorman in 1895 and together they had 2 daughters and 3 sons. Toombs remarried Agnes Claire Donohue in 1944.

Toombs died at the age of 78 at Lansvale, a suburb of Sydney.

A strong workers advocate, Toombs assisted to found Merchant Service Guild (a precursor to the Australian Maritime Officers trade union).

== Political career ==
Toombs was a longtime member of the Australian Labor Party, including service as a member of the central executive from 1914 - 1916. As a Labor candidate he represented Hurstville in the New South Wales Legislative Assembly from 1913 to 1917, during the difficult environment of World War I.

After the War he served as secretary of Radio Telegraphers' Union in 1922.

New South Wales Legislative Assembly
New seat	Member for Hurstville; 1913–1917	Succeeded by Thomas Ley
