= Electoral district of St George =

State electoral district of New South Wales, Australia

St George was an electoral district of the Legislative Assembly in the Australian state of New South Wales, named after the St George district. It was originally created in 1894, when multi-member districts were abolished, and the four member Canterbury was largely divided between Ashfield, Burwood, Canterbury, Petersham and St George. In 1920, with the introduction of proportional representation, St George was expanded to a five-member district, absorbing the electoral districts of Canterbury and Hurstville. Proportional representation was abolished in 1927, and St George was divided into the single member electorates of St George, Canterbury, Hurstville, Oatley and Rockdale. St George was abolished in 1930, being partly replaced by Arncliffe.

== Members for St George ==
Single-member (1894–1920)
Member	Party	Term												
Joseph Carruthers	Free Trade	1894–1901												
Joseph Carruthers	Liberal Reform	1901–1908												
William Taylor	Liberal Reform	1908–1913												
William Bagnall	Labor	1913–1917												
William Bagnall	Nationalist	1917–1920												
Five members (1920–1927)
Member	Party	Term	Member	Party	Term	Member	Party	Term	Member	Party	Term	Member	Party	Term
William Bagnall	Nationalist	1920–1925	George Cann	Labor	1920–1927	Mark Gosling	Labor	1920–1927	Thomas Ley	Progressive	1920–1922	Guy Arkins	Nationalist	1920–1927
William Bagnall	Nationalist	1920–1925	George Cann	Labor	1920–1927	Mark Gosling	Labor	1920–1927	Thomas Ley	Nationalist	1922–1925	Guy Arkins	Nationalist	1920–1927
Joseph Cahill	Labor	1925–1927	George Cann	Labor	1920–1927	Mark Gosling	Labor	1920–1927	Thomas Ley	Nationalist	1922–1925	Guy Arkins	Nationalist	1920–1927
Joseph Cahill	Labor	1925–1927	George Cann	Labor	1920–1927	Mark Gosling	Labor	1920–1927	William Bagnall	Nationalist	1925–1927	Guy Arkins	Nationalist	1920–1927
Single-member (1927–1930)
Member	Party	Term												
Joseph Cahill	Labor	1927–1930												

== Election results ==
1927 New South Wales state election: St George
Party	Candidate	Votes	%	±%
Labor	Joseph Cahill	8,137	55.9	
Nationalist	James Morrish	6,430	44.1	
Total formal votes		14,567	99.1	
Informal votes		138	0.9	
Turnout		14,705	86.9	
Labor win		(new seat)		
