= Candidates of the 1922 New South Wales state election =

This is a list of candidates for the 1922 New South Wales state election. The election was held on 25 March 1922. The election was the second of three conducted under the system of proportional representation.

== Retiring Members ==
=== Labor ===
- Arthur Buckley MLA (Sydney)
- John Estell MLA (Newcastle) — appointed to the Legislative Council

=== Nationalist ===
- James Macarthur-Onslow MLA (Eastern Suburbs) — elected as Progressive

== Legislative Assembly ==
Sitting members are shown in bold text. Successful parties are highlighted in the relevant colour. Successful candidates are indicated by an asterisk (*).

Electorate	Sitting MPs	Labor candidates	Nationalist candidates	Progressive candidates	Other candidates
Balmain	4 Labor; 1 Nationalist	**John Doyle**; **Tom Keegan***; **John Quirk***; David Ryan; **Robert Stuart-Robertson***	Thomas Greentree; Alfred Henry; Albert Lane*; **Albert Smith**; Robert Stopford*		Solomon Amein (Ind); Henry Collins (ISLP); John Hood (ISLP); John Sheehy (Dem)
Bathurst	2 Labor; 1 Nationalist	**James Dooley***; **Valentine Johnston**; Gus Kelly	Alfred Craig; **John Fitzpatrick***; Sir Charles Rosenthal*	Alfred Birney; Arthur Brown; Frederic Swann; Samuel Whitmee	
Botany	4 Labor; 1 Nationalist	**Frank Burke***; **Simon Hickey**; **William McKell***; **Thomas Mutch***; Bill Ratcliffe*	David Alexander; Albert Dunning; **John Lee***; William Pritchard; William Wassall		Daniel McGrath (Dem); Patrick Mulheron (Ind); George Overhill (Ind); Fred Page (Ind); William Wallace (ISLP)
Byron	1 Labor; 1 Nationalist; 1 Progressive	Roger Kiely; Thomas Reidy; **Tom Swiney**	**George Nesbitt***; **Stephen Perdriau***; John Williams	Stephen Blackman; William Missingham*; William Zuill	
Cootamundra	2 Labor; 1 Progressive	Ken Hoad; **Peter Loughlin***; James McGirr*	Arthur Manning; George O'Brien; Alfred Wilcox	Thomas Hough; **Hugh Main***; Frederick Tout	William Lucas (Ind)
Cumberland	1 Labor; 2 Nationalist	**Voltaire Molesworth***; Charles York	**Ernest Carr**; William FitzSimons*; **Bruce Walker Sr***	Edwin Crowther; Reuben Jenner; Albert Smith	
Eastern Suburbs	2 Labor; 2 Nationalist; 1 Progressive	Robert Campbell; **Daniel Dwyer**; Frank Green; **Bob O'Halloran***; Alfred Warton	William Foster; Hyman Goldstein*; **Harold Jaques***; **Charles Oakes***; Millicent Preston-Stanley	Alfred Barber; Joseph Barracluff; Frederick Davison; Alfred Finney; John Keenan; Donald McDonald; Edwin Sautelle	Scott Campbell (Ind Lab) (Note: Scott Campbell had been nominated by the Labor Party for the 1920 election however his endorsement was withdrawn before the polling day because he signed a pledge for the unconditional release of twelve imprisoned members of the Industrial Workers of the World.); Cyril Fallon* (Dem); John Hackett (Ind Lab); Jack Lamier (Ind); Frederick Marks (SNP); Richard Meagher (Ind)
Goulburn	1 Labor; 1 Nationalist; 1 Progressive	**John Bailey***; Thomas Butler; Frank Morgan	Henry Bate; **John Perkins***	Edward Halliday; John O'Reilly; **Thomas Rutledge***	Francis Grogan (Ind); Samuel Rose (Ind)
Maitland	1 Labor; 1 Nationalist; 1 Progressive	William Brennan; John Culbert; **Walter O'Hearn***	**Walter Bennett***; **William Cameron***; George Waller	Benjamin Gelling; Herbert Ralston; Cecil Tindale	Patrick Ferry (Ind)
Murray	1 Labor; 1 Nationalist; 1 Progressive	Walter Boston; **William O'Brien***; Patrick Quilty	**Richard Ball***; Edward Collins; John Jelbart	Ernest Field; **Matthew Kilpatrick***; John Smithenbecker	
Murrumbidgee	1 Labor; 1 Nationalist; 1 Progressive	**Martin Flannery***; James Lyons; James Tully	**Arthur Grimm***; William Hall; John Macallister	**Ernest Buttenshaw***; James Milthorpe; Henry Moulder; George Wilson	James McMahon (Ind)
Namoi	1 Labor; 1 Nationalist; 1 Progressive	Septimus Humphries; **Patrick Scully***; William Scully	**Frank Chaffey***; **Walter Wearne***	Roland Green; Albert Studdy	Robert Levien (Ind)
Newcastle	3 Labor; 1 Nationalist; 1 Independent	Jack Baddeley*; **Hugh Connell***; Amram Lewis; **David Murray***; David Watson	Magnus Cromarty*; **John Fegan**; Robert Kilgour; Kenneth Mathieson; Harry Wheeler	John Cram; George Jenner	**Arthur Gardiner** (Ind Lab); James Gilligan (Ind); Thomas Hoare (Ind); William Jeffery (Ind); Walter Skelton* (Ind)
North Shore	1 Labor; 3 Nationalist; 1 Ind Nationalist	John Cochran; James Donaldson; William Killingsworth; **Cecil Murphy***; Arthur Tonge	**Richard Arthur***; **Arthur Cocks***; **Alfred Reid**; Arthur Walker; **Reginald Weaver***; Albert Whatmore		Edward Clark (Ind); William Fell* (Ind Coal); Jacob Fotheringham (Ind); Harry Meatheringham (Ind); Timothy O'Donoghue (Dem)
Northern Tableland	1 Labor; 2 Progressive	Amos Clarke; Phillip Killey; **Alfred McClelland***	David Doull; Albert Head; George Ring	**Michael Bruxner***; **David Drummond***; James McIlveen	
Oxley	1 Labor; 2 Progressive	Frederick Bennett; **Joseph Fitzgerald***; Alfred O'Neill	**Theodore Hill***; William McRae; Henry Morton	Charles Algie; Harold Henderson; Lewis Martin; **Richard Price**; Roy Vincent*; Matthew Wallace; Albert Whatson	Patrick Moran (Ind)
Parramatta	2 Labor; 1 Nationalist	**Bill Ely**; George Harrison; **Jack Lang***	**Albert Bruntnell***; Thomas Morrow*; Leicester Simpson; Charles Willoughby		John Blake (Ind); James Boughey (Ind Lab); Saxon Hurst (Ind Lab)
Ryde	1 Labor; 2 Nationalist; 1 Progressive; 1 Ind Nationalist	John English; **Robert Greig***; William Hutchison; Alexander Mackie; Thomas Maher	**David Anderson***; **Thomas Bavin***; **Sir Thomas Henley***; **Edward Loxton***; Norman McIntosh; Herbert Small	Lindsay Thompson	John Pattison (Ind)
St George	2 Labor; 2 Nationalist; 1 Progressive	**George Cann***; Patrick Donovan; **Mark Gosling***; Arthur Jones; Sam Toombs	**Guy Arkins***; **William Bagnall***; John Ewen; Francis Farrar; **Thomas Ley***; John Willson	John Cordell; Reginald McDonald; John Wilson	John Cooper (Ind); John Gager (Ind); Henry Short (Ind)
Sturt	2 Labor; 1 Nationalist	**Mat Davidson***; Ted Horsington; **Jabez Wright***	William Daish; **Brian Doe***; John Wicks	Walter O'Grady	William Couch (Ind); Charles Dooley (Ind); Donald Grant (ISLP); Ernest Wetherell (Ind)
Sydney	4 Labor; 1 Nationalist	**John Birt***; **Michael Burke**; **Greg McGirr***; **Patrick Minahan***; George Mullins	Richard Caldwell; Joseph Jackson*; **Daniel Levy***; Ernest Marks; William Nicholls; Ernest Salmon		Richard Allen (Ind); Alfred Bartlett (Ind); Sydney Brown (Ind); Albert Clifton (Ind); Sir Benjamin Fuller (Ind); Henry Jones (Ind); Ernest Llewelyn (Ind); William McCristal (ISLP); Edwin Miller (Ind); William Pickup (Ind); Edward Price (Ind); Solomon Rosenberg (Ind); Charles Tuck (Ind); Robert Williams (Ind)
Wammerawa	2 Labor; 1 Nationalist	**Joseph Clark**; **Bill Dunn***; William Webster	John Macdonald; Percy Shortland; John Wark	James Berryman; Edward Kater; George Oram; Edward Scully; Harold Thorby*; Gordon Wilkins	**William Ashford*** (Ind); Arthur Heany (Ind)
Western Suburbs	2 Labor; 2 Nationalist; 1 Progressive	**Carlo Lazzarini***; Harold Macdonald; **Edward McTiernan***; Joseph Smith; James Stewart	**Tom Hoskins***; John Ness*; **Sydney Shillington**; William Simpson; **James Wilson***	Alexander Huie; Clare Wilson	
Wollondilly	2 Labor; 1 Nationalist	**John Cleary**; **Billy Davies***; Walter Thompson	Samuel Emmett; **Sir George Fuller***; Mark Morton*	William Howarth	Arthur Silvey-Reardon (Ind)

== See also ==
- Members of the New South Wales Legislative Assembly, 1922–1925
- Results of the 1922 New South Wales state election
