= Electoral results for the district of Sydney =

Election results for Sydney, New South Wales, Australia

Sydney, an electoral district of the Legislative Assembly in the Australian state of New South Wales, has had two incarnations, the first from 1920 to 1927 as a five-member electorate, the second from 2007 to the present as a single-member electorate.

== Members for Sydney ==
First incarnation (1894–1907)
Election	Member	Party	Member	Party	Member	Party	Member	Party	Member	Party
1920	Daniel Levy	Nationalist	Arthur Buckley	Labor	John Birt	Labor	Michael Burke	Labor	Patrick Minahan	Labor
1922	Daniel Levy	Nationalist	Joseph Jackson	Nationalist	John Birt	Labor	Greg McGirr	Labor	Patrick Minahan	Labor
1925	Daniel Levy	Nationalist	Joseph Jackson	Nationalist	John Birt	Labor	Michael Burke	Labor	William Holdsworth	Labor
1925 apt	Daniel Levy	Nationalist	Joseph Jackson	Nationalist	Patrick Minahan	Labor	Michael Burke	Labor	William Holdsworth	Labor
Second incarnation (2007–present)
Election	Member	Party								
2007	Clover Moore	Independent								
2011	Clover Moore	Independent								
2012 by	Alex Greenwich	Independent								
2015	Alex Greenwich	Independent								
2019	Alex Greenwich	Independent								

== Election results ==
=== Elections in the 2020s ===
==== 2023 ====
2023 New South Wales state election: Sydney
Party	Candidate	Votes	%	±%
Independent	Alex Greenwich	20,025	41.1	+4.4
Liberal	Phyllisse Stanton	11,219	23.0	−5.4
Labor	Skye Tito	10,575	21.7	+5.5
Greens	Nick Ward	5,949	12.2	−0.5
Sustainable Australia	Mark Whitton	972	2.0	+0.3
Total formal votes		48,740	98.2	+0.1
Informal votes		900	1.8	−0.1
Turnout		49,640	79.4	−0.3
Notional two-party-preferred count
Labor	Skye Tito	22,054	61.3	+11.2
Liberal	Phyllisse Stanton	13,936	38.7	−11.2
Two-candidate-preferred result
Independent	Alex Greenwich	26,600	65.6	−10.4
Labor	Skye Tito	13,921	34.4	+10.4
Independent hold		Swing	−10.4	

=== Elections in the 2010s ===
==== 2019 ====
2019 New South Wales state election: Sydney
Party	Candidate	Votes	%	±%
Independent	Alex Greenwich	17,905	41.45	+1.80
Liberal	Lyndon Gannon	13,089	30.30	−2.54
Labor	Jo Holder	6,370	14.75	+0.00
Greens	Jonathan Harms	4,124	9.55	−0.18
Small Business	Fiona Douskou	1,017	2.35	+2.35
Sustainable Australia	Christopher Thomas	696	1.61	+1.61
Total formal votes		43,201	98.17	+0.56
Informal votes		807	1.83	−0.56
Turnout		44,008	79.82	−2.64
Two-party-preferred result
Liberal	Lyndon Gannon	16,259	52.96	−3.70
Labor	Jo Holder	14,444	47.04	+3.70
Two-candidate-preferred result
Independent	Alex Greenwich	22,841	61.77	+3.70
Liberal	Lyndon Gannon	14,134	38.23	−3.70
Independent hold		Swing	+3.70	

==== 2015 ====
2015 New South Wales state election: Sydney
Party	Candidate	Votes	%	±%
Independent	Alex Greenwich	16,947	39.6	+39.6
Liberal	Patrice Pandeleos	14,037	32.8	−6.1
Labor	Edwina Lloyd	6,303	14.7	+4.3
Greens	Chris Brentin	4,156	9.7	−2.6
No Land Tax	David Pelzman	495	1.2	+1.2
Christian Democrats	Elaine Addae	367	0.9	−0.2
Centre	Joanna Rzetelski	230	0.5	+0.5
Independent	Victor Taffa	213	0.5	+0.5
Total formal votes		42,748	97.6	+0.4
Informal votes		1,047	2.4	−0.4
Turnout		43,795	82.5	+4.6
Notional two-party-preferred count
Liberal	Patrice Pandeleos	16,212	56.7	−11.3
Labor	Edwina Lloyd	12,401	43.3	+11.3
Two-candidate-preferred result
Independent	Alex Greenwich	20,612	58.1	+7.8
Liberal	Patrice Pandeleos	14,885	41.9	−7.8
Independent hold		Swing	+7.8	

==== 2012 by-election ====
2012 Sydney by-election Saturday 27 October
Party	Candidate	Votes	%	±%
Independent	Alex Greenwich	17,687	47.3	+47.3
Liberal	Shayne Mallard	11,543	30.9	–5.3
Greens	Chris Harris	6,616	17.7	+4.9
Independent	Glenn Wall	825	2.2	+2.2
Christian Democrats	Robyn Peebles	724	1.9	+0.8
Total formal votes		37,395	97.2	–0.6
Informal votes		1,062	2.8	+0.6
Turnout		38,457	62.6	–21.3
Two-candidate-preferred result
Independent	Alex Greenwich	21,283	63.7	+63.7
Liberal	Shayne Mallard	12,120	36.3	–10.6
Independent hold		Swing	N/A	

Clover Moore (Independent) resigned.

==== 2011 ====
2011 New South Wales state election: Sydney
Party	Candidate	Votes	%	±%
Independent	Clover Moore	16,909	36.3	−3.3
Liberal	Adrian Bartels	16,855	36.2	+14.6
Greens	De Brierley Newton	5,961	12.8	−2.8
Labor	Sacha Blumen	5,247	11.3	−8.7
Sex Party	Andrew Patterson	676	1.5	+1.5
Christian Democrats	Peter Madden	508	1.1	+1.1
Fishing Party	Victor Shen	464	1.0	+1.0
Total formal votes		46,620	97.8	0.0
Informal votes		1,040	2.2	0.0
Turnout		47,660	83.9	
Notional two-party-preferred count
Liberal	Adrian Bartels	20,843	65.5	+22.4
Labor	Sacha Blumen	10,970	34.5	−22.4
Two-candidate-preferred result
Independent	Clover Moore	20,651	53.1	−13.5
Liberal	Adrian Bartels	18,220	46.9	+46.9
Independent hold		Swing	−13.5	

=== Elections in the 2000s ===
==== 2007 ====
2007 New South Wales state election: Sydney
Party	Candidate	Votes	%	±%
Independent	Clover Moore	16,316	39.6	+7.2
Liberal	Edward Mandla	8,877	21.6	+1.0
Labor	Linda Scott	8,235	20.0	−6.7
Greens	Chris Harris	6,407	15.6	+0.3
Independent	Malcolm Duncan	735	1.8	+1.3
Unity	Imanuel Choyce	614	1.5	+1.1
Total formal votes		41,184	97.8	−0.1
Informal votes		910	2.2	+0.1
Turnout		42,094	84.1	
Notional two-party-preferred count
Labor	Linda Scott	15,184	56.9	−6.5
Liberal	Edward Mandla	11,523	43.1	+6.5
Two-candidate-preferred result
Independent	Clover Moore	20,364	66.6	+1.6
Labor	Linda Scott	10,193	33.4	−1.6
Independent notional hold		Swing	+1.6	

District recreated

==== 1927–2007 ====
District abolished

=== Elections in the 1920s ===
==== 1925 appointment ====
John Birt died on 21 June 1925. Between 1920 and 1927 the Legislative Assembly was elected using a form of proportional representation with multi-member seats and a single transferable vote (modified Hare-Clark). The Parliamentary Elections (Casual Vacancies) Act, provided that casual vacancies were filled by the next unsuccessful candidate on the incumbent member's party list. Patrick Minahan had the most votes of the unsuccessful Labor candidates at the 1925 election and took his seat on 24 June 1925.

==== 1925 ====
1925 New South Wales state election: Sydney
Party	Candidate	Votes	%	±%
Quota		5,852		
Labor	John Birt (elected 1)	9,152	26.1	+11.8
Labor	Michael Burke (elected 2)	5,354	15.3	+5.9
Labor	William Holdsworth (elected 4)	2,796	8.0	+8.0
Labor	Patrick Minahan	2,403	6.8	−3.1
Labor	Francis McGuinness	1,668	4.8	+4.8
Nationalist	Joseph Jackson (elected 3)	5,096	14.5	+1.7
Nationalist	Daniel Levy (elected 5)	4,586	13.1	+4.8
Nationalist	Albert Higgs	1,494	4.3	+4.3
Nationalist	Gordon Stead	231	0.7	+0.7
Nationalist	Reuben Kefford	74	0.2	+0.2
Young Australia	Greg McGirr	1,333	3.8	+3.8
Young Australia	Leslie Milgate	15	0.04	+0.04
Young Australia	Alphonsus Cannon	14	0.04	+0.04
Young Australia	Charles Mortimer	11	0.03	+0.03
Communist	Jock Garden	317	0.9	+0.9
Communist	Patrick Drew	17	0.1	+0.1
Protestant Labour	Laurence Raw	323	0.9	+0.9
Independent	Robert Bates	162	0.5	+0.5
Independent	Charles Foster	32	0.1	+0.1
Independent	James Jones	21	0.1	+0.1
Independent	Edwin Miller	8	0.02	−0.05
Total formal votes		35,107	96.1	+0.4
Informal votes		1,410	3.9	−0.4
Turnout		36,517	58.0	−0.1
Party total votes
Labor		21,373	60.9	+6.3
Nationalist		11,481	32.7	−2.8
Young Australia		1,373	3.9	+3.9
Communist		334	1.0	+1.0
Protestant Labour		323	0.9	+0.9
Independent	Robert Bates	162	0.5	+0.5
Independent	Charles Foster	32	0.1	+0.1
Independent	James Jones	21	0.1	+0.1
Independent	Edwin Miller	8	0.02	−0.05

==== 1922 ====
1922 New South Wales state election: Sydney
Party	Candidate	Votes	%	±%
Quota		6,351		
Labor	Greg McGirr (elected 1)	6,304	16.6	+16.6
Labor	John Birt (elected 4)	5,433	14.3	0.0
Labor	Patrick Minahan (elected 5)	3,756	9.9	+0.3
Labor	Michael Burke (defeated)	3,589	9.4	−0.6
Labor	George Mullins	1,718	4.5	+4.5
Nationalist	Joseph Jackson (elected 2)	4,864	12.8	+2.9
Nationalist	Daniel Levy (elected 3)	3,178	8.3	−9.8
Nationalist	Richard Caldwell	1,929	5.1	+5.1
Nationalist	Ernest Salmon	1,672	4.4	+4.4
Nationalist	Ernest Marks	1,618	4.2	+4.2
Nationalist	William Nicholls	247	0.6	+0.6
Independent	Ben Fuller	3,000	7.9	+7.9
Independent	Edward Price	227	0.6	+0.6
Independent	Henry Jones	166	0.4	+0.4
Industrial Labor	William McCristal	98	0.3	+0.3
Independent	Richard Allen	83	0.2	+0.2
Independent	Sydney Brown	48	0.1	+0.1
Independent	Alfred Bartlett	36	0.1	+0.1
Independent	Albert Clifton	28	0.1	+0.1
Independent	Charles Tuck	28	0.1	+0.1
Independent	Edwin Miller	25	0.1	+0.1
Independent	William Pickup	19	0.1	+0.1
Independent	Solomon Rosenberg	14	0.04	+0.04
Independent	Robert Williams	11	0.03	+0.03
Independent	Ernest Llewelyn	11	0.03	+0.03
Total formal votes		38,102	95.7	+11.0
Informal votes		1,714	4.3	−11.0
Turnout		39,816	58.1	+13.7
Party total votes
Labor		20,800	54.6	+1.0
Nationalist		13,508	35.4	+7.3
Independent	Ben Fuller	3,000	7.9	+7.9
Independent	Edward Price	227	0.6	+0.6
Independent	Henry Jones	166	0.4	+0.4
Industrial Labor		98	0.3	+0.3
Independent	Richard Allen	83	0.2	+0.2
Independent	Sydney Brown	48	0.1	+0.1
Independent	Alfred Bartlett	36	0.1	+0.1
Independent	Albert Clifton	28	0.1	+0.1
Independent	Charles Tuck	28	0.1	+0.1
Independent	Edwin Miller	25	0.1	+0.1
Independent	William Pickup	19	0.1	+0.1
Independent	Solomon Rosenberg	14	0.04	+0.04
Independent	Robert Williams	11	0.03	+0.03
Independent	Ernest Llewelyn	11	0.03	+0.03

==== 1920 ====
1920 New South Wales state election: Sydney
Party	Candidate	Votes	%	±%
Quota		4,224		
Labor	John Birt (elected 2)	3,613	14.3	
Labor	Arthur Buckley (elected 4)	2,987	11.8	
Labor	Michael Burke (elected 5)	2,529	10.0	
Labor	Patrick Minahan (Note: Patrick Minahan and Scott Campbell were nominated by the Labor Party, however their endorsement was withdrawn before the polling day because they signed a pledge for the unconditional release of twelve imprisoned members of the Industrial Workers of the World.) (elected 3)	2,425	9.6	
Labor	Tom Smith (defeated)	2,016	8.0	
Nationalist	Daniel Levy (elected 1)	4,599	18.1	
Nationalist	Joseph Jackson	2,513	9.9	
Independent	Richard Meagher	2,115	8.4	
Democratic	Patrick Cleary	1,654	6.5	
Socialist Labor	Ernie Judd	282	1.1	
Socialist Labor	Daisy Loughran	45	0.2	
Soldiers & Citizens	Charles Smith	134	0.5	
Soldiers & Citizens	James Ritchie	88	0.4	
Soldiers & Citizens	John Clasby	84	0.3	
Independent	William Thomas	119	0.5	
Independent	Alfred Bartlett	102	0.4	
Independent	Patrick Craddock	18	0.1	
Independent	Joseph Sydney	12	0.1	
Independent	Edwin Miller	3	0.0	
Independent	John O'Sullivan	3	0.0	
Total formal votes		25,341	84.7	
Informal votes		4,579	15.3	
Turnout		29,920	44.4	
Party total votes
Labor		13,570	53.5	
Nationalist		7,112	28.1	
Independent	Richard Meagher	2,115	8.4	
Democratic		1,654	6.5	
Socialist Labor		327	1.3	
Soldiers & Citizens		306	1.2	
Independent	William Thomas	119	0.5	
Independent	Alfred Bartlett	102	0.4	
Independent	Patrick Craddock	18	0.1	
Independent	Joseph Sydney	12	0.1	
Independent	Edwin Miller	3	0.0	
Independent	John O'Sullivan	3	0.0	
