= Results of the 1922 New South Wales state election =

State election for New South Wales, Australia in March 1992

1922 New South Wales state election Legislative Assembly << 1920–1925 >>
Enrolled voters	1,251,023				
Votes cast	875,464		Turnout	70.00	+13.81
Informal votes	31,771		Informal	3.63	−6.07
Summary of votes by party
Party	Primary votes	%	Swing	Seats	Change
Nationalist	364,211	43.17	+13.25	41	+13
Labor	324,677	38.48	−4.60	36	−7
Progressive	93,488	11.08	−4.04	9	−6
Independent	31,880	3.78	−1.07	1	0
Democratic	14,354	1.70	−0.69	1	+1
Independent Labor	7,438	0.88	+0.88	0	
Ind. Coalitionist	5,727	0.68	+0.68	1	+1
Industrial Labor	1,674	0.20	+0.20	0	
Soldier's Nationalist	244	0.03	+0.03	0	
Total	843,693			90	

The 1922 New South Wales state election was for 90 seats representing 24 electoral districts, with each district returning between 3 and 5 members. This was the second election in New South Wales that took place under a modified Hare-Clark voting system. The average number of enrolled voters per member was 13,785, ranging from Sturt (10,386) to Ryde (15,722).

== Results by electoral district ==
=== Balmain ===
1922 New South Wales state election: Balmain
Party	Candidate	Votes	%	±%
Quota		7,380		
Labor	Robert Stuart-Robertson (elected 5)	5,950	13.4	+4.3
Labor	John Quirk (elected 3)	5,903	13.3	+3.1
Labor	Tom Keegan (elected 4)	5,679	12.8	+4.4
Labor	John Doyle (defeated)	4,313	9.7	+2.1
Labor	David Ryan	1,780	4.0	+4.0
Nationalist	Robert Stopford (elected 2)	6,264	14.1	+1.4
Nationalist	Albert Lane (elected 1)	5,258	11.9	+11.9
Nationalist	Albert Smith (defeated)	3,294	7.4	−2.4
Nationalist	Thomas Greentree	1,884	4.3	+4.3
Nationalist	Alfred Henry	1,563	3.5	+3.5
Democratic	John Sheehy	2,163	4.9	+4.9
Industrial Labor	Henry Collins	64	0.1	+0.1
Industrial Labor	John Hood	63	0.1	+0.1
Independent	Solomon Amein	99	0.2	0.0
Total formal votes		44,277	95.9	+9.5
Informal votes		1,876	4.1	−9.5
Turnout		46,153	69.0	+14.7
Party total votes
Labor		23,625	53.4	−6.3
Nationalist		18,263	41.2	+18.8
Democratic		2,163	4.9	−2.4
Industrial Labor		127	0.3	+0.3
Independent	Solomon Amein	99	0.2	0.0

=== Bathurst ===
1922 New South Wales state election: Bathurst
Party	Candidate	Votes	%	±%
Quota		7,351		
Labor	James Dooley (elected 2)	7,708	26.2	−5.0
Labor	Valentine Johnston (defeated)	5,745	19.5	−2.6
Labor	Gus Kelly	337	1.2	+1.2
Nationalist	John Fitzpatrick (elected 1)	8,449	28.7	+3.2
Nationalist	Charles Rosenthal (elected 3)	3,808	12.9	+12.9
Nationalist	Alfred Craig	816	2.8	+2.8
Progressive	Arthur Brown	1,162	3.9	−4.1
Progressive	Samuel Whitmee	903	3.1	+3.1
Progressive	Alfred Birney	348	1.2	+1.2
Progressive	Frederic Swann	125	0.4	+0.4
Total formal votes		29,401	96.3	+1.5
Informal votes		1,134	3.7	−1.5
Turnout		30,535	71.1	+8.7
Party total votes
Labor		13,790	46.9	−6.4
Nationalist		13,073	44.5	+11.7
Progressive		2,538	8.6	−4.6

=== Botany ===
1922 New South Wales state election: Botany
Party	Candidate	Votes	%	±%
Labor	Thomas Mutch (elected 4)	6,733	15.0	−5.3
Labor	William McKell (elected 5)	6,176	13.8	−1.6
Labor	Bill Ratcliffe (elected 3)	5,816	13.0	+8.3
Labor	Frank Burke (elected 2)	4,722	10.5	−5.9
Labor	Simon Hickey (defeated)	4,239	9.5	−0.6
Nationalist	John Lee (elected 1)	9,365	20.9	+5.1
Nationalist	David Alexander	1,362	3.0	+3.0
Nationalist	William Pritchard	1,269	2.8	+2.8
Nationalist	William Wassall	756	1.7	+1.7
Nationalist	Albert Dunning	532	1.2	+1.2
Democratic	Daniel McGrath	3,041	6.8	+6.8
Independent	Fred Page	523	1.2	+1.2
Independent	George Overhill	117	0.3	+0.3
Industrial Labor	William Wallace	71	0.2	+0.2
Independent	Patrick Mulheron	63	0.1	+0.1
Total formal votes		44,785	95.0	+10.5
Informal votes		2,377	5.0	−10.5
Turnout		47,162	68.6	+16.8
Party total votes
Labor		27,686	61.8	−5.2
Nationalist		13,284	29.7	+9.9
Democratic		3,041	6.8	−0.8
Independent	Fred Page	523	1.2	+1.2
Independent	George Overhill	117	0.3	+0.3
Industrial Labor		71	0.2	+0.2
Independent	Patrick Mulheron	63	0.1	+0.1

=== Byron ===
1922 New South Wales state election: Byron
Party	Candidate	Votes	%	±%
Nationalist	George Nesbitt (elected 1)	8,672	28.8	+5.2
Nationalist	Stephen Perdriau (elected 2)	6,813	22.6	+22.6
Nationalist	John Williams	1,000	3.3	+3.3
Labor	Tom Swiney (defeated)	6,782	22.5	+2.9
Labor	Roger Kiely	277	0.9	+0.9
Labor	Thomas Reidy	94	0.3	+0.3
Progressive	William Missingham (elected 3)	3,084	10.2	0.0
Progressive	William Zuill	2,740	9.1	+9.1
Progressive	Stephen Blackman	632	2.1	+2.1
Total formal votes		30,094	97.2	+4.1
Informal votes		867	2.8	−4.1
Turnout		30,961	70.8	+15.1
Party total votes
Nationalist		16,485	54.8	+21.9
Labor		7,153	23.8	+3.0
Progressive		6,456	21.4	−9.1

=== Cootamundra ===
1922 New South Wales state election: Cootamundra
Party	Candidate	Votes	%	±%
Labor	Peter Loughlin (elected 1)	6,258	22.6	−3.1
Labor	James McGirr (elected 3)	5,577	20.1	−7.2
Labor	Ken Hoad	2,097	7.6	+7.6
Progressive	Hugh Main (elected 2)	5,966	21.5	+7.5
Progressive	Frederick Tout	2,455	8.9	+8.9
Progressive	Thomas Hough	1,056	3.8	+3.8
Nationalist	Arthur Manning	3,410	12.3	+12.3
Nationalist	Alfred Wilcox	448	1.6	+1.6
Nationalist	George O'Brien	268	1.0	+1.0
Independent	William Lucas	170	0.6	+0.6
Total formal votes		27,705	96.4	+1.3
Informal votes		1,027	3.6	−1.3
Turnout		28,732	70.6	+3.7
Party total votes
Labor		13,932	50.3	−4.4
Progressive		9,477	34.2	+6.3
Nationalist		4,126	14.9	−2.5
Independent	William Lucas	170	0.6	+0.6

=== Cumberland ===
1922 New South Wales state election: Cumberland
Party	Candidate	Votes	%	±%
Nationalist	William FitzSimons (elected 1)	7,498	25.8	+25.8
Nationalist	Bruce Walker (elected 3)	6,701	23.0	+0.8
Nationalist	Ernest Carr (defeated)	6,555	22.5	+9.0
Labor	Voltaire Molesworth (elected 2)	7,434	25.6	+2.4
Labor	Charles York	145	0.5	+0.5
Progressive	Edwin Crowther	326	1.1	+1.1
Progressive	Albert Smith	293	1.0	+1.0
Progressive	Reuben Jenner	138	0.5	+0.5
Total formal votes		29,090	97.0	+4.6
Informal votes		883	3.0	−4.6
Turnout		29,973	70.0	+15.7
Party total votes
Nationalist		20,754	71.3	+22.8
Labor		7,579	26.1	−4.4
Progressive		757	2.6	−10.6

=== Eastern Suburbs ===
1922 New South Wales state election: Eastern Suburbs
Party	Candidate	Votes	%	±%
Quota		8,537		
Nationalist	Charles Oakes (elected 1)	10,297	20.1	+5.2
Nationalist	Harold Jaques (elected 3)	5,840	11.4	−3.6
Nationalist	Hyman Goldstein (elected 4)	5,106	10.0	+10.0
Nationalist	Millicent Preston-Stanley	4,012	7.8	+7.8
Nationalist	William Foster	2,627	5.1	+5.1
Labor	Bob O'Halloran (elected 2)	5,944	11.6	+0.6
Labor	Daniel Dwyer (defeated)	1,620	3.2	−1.1
Labor	Alfred Warton	859	1.7	+1.7
Labor	Robert Campbell	697	1.4	+1.4
Labor	Frank Green	480	0.9	+0.9
Democratic	Cyril Fallon (elected 5)	5,581	10.9	+10.9
Progressive	Joseph Barracluff	2,200	4.3	+4.3
Progressive	Frederick Davison	265	0.5	+0.5
Progressive	Donald McDonald	188	0.4	+0.4
Progressive	Edwin Sautelle	181	0.4	+0.4
Progressive	John Keenan	160	0.3	+0.3
Progressive	Alfred Barber	65	0.1	+0.1
Progressive	Alfred Finney	58	0.1	+0.1
Independent	Richard Meagher	2,490	4.9	+4.9
Independent Labor	Scott Campbell (Note: Scott Campbell had been nominated by the Labor Party for the 1920 election however his endorsement was withdrawn before the polling day because he signed a pledge for the unconditional release of twelve imprisoned members of the Industrial Workers of the World.)	2,242	4.4	+4.4
Soldier's Nationalist	Frederick Marks	244	0.5	+0.5
Independent Labor	John Hackett	47	0.1	+0.1
Independent	Jack Lamier	13	0.03	+0.03
Total formal votes		51,216	97.0	+8.5
Informal votes		1,577	3.0	−8.5
Turnout		52,793	69.1	+18.0
Party total votes
Nationalist		27,882	54.4	+11.1
Labor		9,600	18.7	−12.0
Democratic		5,581	10.9	+10.9
Progressive		3,117	6.1	−5.6
Independent	Richard Meagher	2,490	4.9	+4.9
Independent Labor	Johnston Campbell	2,242	4.4	+4.4
Ind. Nationalist	Frederick Marks	244	0.5	+0.5
Independent Labor	John Hackett	47	0.1	+0.1
Independent	Jack Lamier	13	0.03	+0.03

=== Goulburn ===
1922 New South Wales state election: Goulburn
Party	Candidate	Votes	%	±%
Quota		6,427		
Labor	John Bailey (elected 1)	7,329	28.5	−7.1
Labor	Frank Morgan	2,080	8.1	+6.0
Labor	Thomas Butler	176	0.7	+0.7
Progressive	Thomas Rutledge (elected 3)	3,707	14.4	+2.7
Progressive	John O'Reilly	2,820	11.0	+11.0
Progressive	Edward Halliday	1,821	7.1	+7.1
Nationalist	John Perkins (elected 2)	4,607	17.9	+17.9
Nationalist	Henry Bate	3,078	12.0	+12.0
Independent	Francis Grogan	76	0.3	+0.3
Independent	Samuel Rose	12	0.1	+0.1
Total formal votes		25,706	96.0	+5.3
Informal votes		1,059	4.0	−5.3
Turnout		26,765	69.6	+11.3
Party total votes
Labor		9,585	37.3	−1.4
Progressive		8,348	32.5	+11.2
Nationalist		7,685	29.9	+0.5
Independent	Francis Grogan	76	0.3	+0.3
Independent	Samuel Rose	12	0.1	+0.1

=== Maitland ===
1922 New South Wales state election: Maitland
Party	Candidate	Votes	%	±%
Quota		6,863		
Nationalist	Walter Bennett (elected 3)	5,410	19.7	+2.0
Nationalist	William Cameron (elected 2)	4,784	17.4	+7.4
Nationalist	George Walter	4,446	16.2	+16.2
Labor	Walter O'Hearn (elected 1)	8,461	30.8	+12.8
Labor	William Brennan	801	2.9	2.9
Labor	John Culbert	117	0.4	+0.4
Progressive	Benjamin Gelling	2,060	7.5	+7.5
Progressive	Cecil Tindale	1,150	4.2	−1.8
Progressive	Herbert Ralston	175	0.6	+0.6
Independent	Patrick Ferry	47	0.2	+0.2
Total formal votes		27,451	96.0	+4.5
Informal votes		1,130	4.0	−4.5
Turnout		28,581	69.5	+14.2
Party total votes
Nationalist		14,640	53.3	+21.2
Labor		9,379	34.2	−2.9
Progressive		3,385	12.3	−17.6
Independent	Patrick Ferry	47	0.2	+0.2

=== Murray ===
1922 New South Wales state election: Murray
Party	Candidate	Votes	%	±%
Quota		6,162		
Nationalist	Richard Ball (elected 1)	7,933	32.2	+12.3
Nationalist	Edward Collins	1,895	7.7	+7.7
Nationalist	John Jelbart	342	1.4	+1.4
Labor	William O'Brien (elected 2)	6,343	25.7	+1.3
Labor	Patrick Quilty	2,137	8.7	+8.7
Labor	Walter Boston	1,674	6.8	+6.8
Progressive	Matthew Kilpatrick (elected 3)	3,043	12.3	+8.6
Progressive	Ernest Field	738	3.0	+3.0
Progressive	John Smithenbecker	539	2.2	+2.2
Total formal votes		24,644	95.8	+2.1
Informal votes		1,092	4.2	−2.1
Turnout		25,736	65.2	+9.3
Party total votes
Nationalist		10,170	41.3	+10.1
Labor		10,154	41.2	−4.7
Progressive		4,320	17.5	−5.4

=== Murrumbidgee ===
1922 New South Wales state election: Murrumbidgee
Party	Candidate	Votes	%	±%
Quota		6,322		
Labor	Martin Flannery (elected 1)	9,516	37.6	+20.4
Labor	James Tully	600	2.4	+2.4
Labor	James Lyons	214	0.9	+0.9
Progressive	Ernest Buttenshaw (elected 2)	8,701	34.4	+23.1
Progressive	George Wilson	544	2.1	+2.1
Progressive	Henry Moulder	532	2.1	+2.1
Progressive	James Milthorpe	506	2.0	+2.0
Nationalist	Arthur Grimm (elected 3)	3,712	14.7	−2.5
Nationalist	William Hall	723	2.9	+2.9
Nationalist	John Macallister	86	0.3	+0.3
Independent	James McMahon	151	0.6	+0.6
Total formal votes		25,285	95.0	+4.3
Informal votes		1,321	5.0	−4.3
Turnout		26,606	63.9	+4.9
Party total votes
Labor		10,330	40.9	−5.0
Progressive		10,283	40.7	+15.9
Nationalist		4,521	17.9	+0.7
Independent	James McMahon	151	0.6	+0.6

=== Namoi ===
1922 New South Wales state election: Namoi
Party	Candidate	Votes	%	±%
Quota		6,483		
Nationalist	Frank Chaffey (elected 2)	5,823	22.5	+9.4
Nationalist	Walter Wearne (elected 3)	5,363	20.7	+5.8
Labor	Patrick Scully (elected 1)	7,880	30.4	−6.5
Labor	William Scully	1,602	6.2	+4.4
Labor	Septimus Humphries	325	1.3	+1.3
Progressive	Roland Green	1,906	7.3	+7.3
Progressive	Albert Studdy	599	2.3	+2.3
Independent	Robert Levien	2,433	9.4	−1.2
Total formal votes		25,931	96.0	+2.5
Informal votes		1,087	4.0	−2.5
Turnout		27,018	70.2	+8.5
Party total votes
Nationalist		11,186	43.1	+18.0
Labor		9,807	37.8	−3.6
Progressive		2,505	9.7	−13.2
Independent	Robert Levien	2,433	9.4	−1.2

=== Newcastle ===
1922 New South Wales state election: Newcastle
Party	Candidate	Votes	%	±%
Quota		8,688		
Labor	Jack Baddeley (elected 2)	11,850	22.7	+22.7
Labor	David Murray (elected 4)	6,629	12.7	+6.2
Labor	Hugh Connell (elected 3)	3,646	7.0	−13.5
Labor	David Watson	2,356	4.5	+4.5
Labor	Amram Lewis	1,529	2.9	−1.3
Independent	Walter Skelton (elected 1)	13,132	25.2	+25.2
Nationalist	Magnus Cromarty (elected 5)	2,833	5.4	+5.4
Nationalist	John Fegan (defeated)	1,602	3.1	−3.3
Nationalist	Harry Wheeler	1,260	2.4	+2.4
Nationalist	Robert Kilgour	1,052	2.0	+2.0
Nationalist	Kenneth Mathieson	516	1.0	+1.0
Independent Labor	Arthur Gardiner (defeated)	4,644	8.9	−8.8
Independent	Thomas Hoare	566	1.1	+1.1
Progressive	George Jenner	295	0.6	+0.6
Progressive	John Cram	151	0.3	+0.3
Independent	James Gilligan	38	0.1	+0.1
Independent	William Jeffery	27	0.1	+0.1
Total formal votes		52,126	96.7	+9.3
Informal votes		1,771	3.3	−9.3
Turnout		53,897	75.2	+16.1
Party total votes
Labor		26,010	49.9	−7.6
Independent	Walter Skelton	13,132	25.2	+25.2
Nationalist		7,263	13.9	+1.0
Independent Labor	Arthur Gardiner	4,644	8.9	−8.8
Independent	Thomas Hoare	566	1.1	+1.1
Progressive		446	0.9	−2.3
Independent	James Gilligan	38	0.1	+0.1
Independent	William Jeffery	27	0.1	+0.1

=== North Shore ===
1922 New South Wales state election: North Shore
Party	Candidate	Votes	%	±%
Quota		8,456		
Nationalist	Reginald Weaver (elected 1)	10,226	20.2	+4.9
Nationalist	Richard Arthur (elected 4)	5,488	10.8	−3.4
Nationalist	Arthur Cocks (elected 3)	5,483	10.8	+2.8
Nationalist	Alfred Reid (defeated)	4,469	8.8	
Nationalist	Arthur Walker	2,493	4.9	
Nationalist	Albert Whatmore	2,088	4.12	
Labor	Cecil Murphy (elected 2)	8,302	16.4	+8.5
Labor	James Donaldson	505	1.0	+1.0
Labor	John Cochran	206	0.4	+0.4
Labor	Arthur Tonge	63	+0.1	+0.1
Labor	William Killingsworth	43	0.1	+0.1
Ind. Coalitionist	William Fell (elected 5)	5,727	11.3	+11.3
Democratic	Timothy O'Donoghue	3,569	7.0	−0.3
Independent	Jacob Fotheringham	1,381	2.7	+2.7
Independent	Edward Clark	633	1.3	−1.5
Independent	Harry Meatheringham	58	0.1	+0.1
Total formal votes		50,734	97.7	+10.4
Informal votes		1,205	2.3	−10.4
Turnout		51,939	72.8	+16.8
Party total votes
Nationalist		30,247	59.6	+13.7
Labor		9,119	18.0	−0.3
Ind. Coalitionist	William Fell	5,727	11.3	+11.3
Democratic		3,569	7.0	−0.3
Independent	Jacob Fotheringham	1,381	2.7	+2.7
Independent	Edward Clark	633	1.3	−1.5
Independent	Harry Meatheringham	58	0.1	+0.1

=== Northern Tableland ===
1922 New South Wales state election: Northern Tableland
Party	Candidate	Votes	%	±%
Quota		5,819		
Progressive	Michael Bruxner (elected 1)	9,094	39.1	+15.6
Progressive	David Drummond (elected 3)	3,493	15.0	+5.0
Progressive	James McIlveen	563	2.4	+2.4
Labor	Alfred McClelland (elected 2)	6,276	27.0	−2.5
Labor	Phillip Killey	704	3.0	+3.0
Labor	Amos Clarke	422	1.8	+1.8
Nationalist	David Doull	1,532	6.6	+6.6
Nationalist	George Ring	872	3.7	+3.7
Nationalist	Albert Head	318	1.4	+1.4
Total formal votes		23,274	95.4	+1.8
Informal votes		1,122	4.6	−1.8
Turnout		24,396	65.5	+8.1
Party total votes
Progressive		13,150	56.5	+7.5
Labor		7,402	31.8	−5.4
Nationalist		2,722	11.7	−2.0

=== Oxley ===
1922 New South Wales state election: Oxley
Party	Candidate	Votes	%	±%
Quota		7,634		
Progressive	Roy Vincent (elected 2)	3,844	12.6	+12.6
Progressive	Richard Price (defeated)	3,495	11.4	−8.4
Progressive	Lewis Martin	2,116	6.9	+6.9
Progressive	Harold Henderson	1,760	5.8	+5.8
Progressive	Matthew Wallace	1,145	3.8	+3.8
Progressive	Charles Algie	913	3.0	+3.0
Progressive	Albert Whatson	366	1.2	+1.2
Nationalist	Theodore Hill (elected 1)	3,914	12.8	+12.8
Nationalist	Henry Morton	3,622	11.9	−6.1
Nationalist	William McRae	1,748	5.7	+5.7
Labor	Joseph Fitzgerald (elected 3)	4,234	13.9	−9.3
Labor	Alfred O'Neill	2,498	8.2	+8.2
Labor	Frederick Bennett	383	1.3	+1.3
Independent	Patrick Moran	496	1.6	+1.6
Total formal votes		30,534	96.8	+3.4
Informal votes		1,002	3.2	−3.4
Turnout		31,536	73.0	+19.8
Party total votes
Progressive		13,639	44.7	−10.5
Nationalist		9,284	30.4	+12.4
Labor		7,115	23.3	−1.6
Independent	Patrick Moran	496	1.6	+1.6

=== Parramatta ===
1922 New South Wales state election: Parramatta
Party	Candidate	Votes	%	±%
Quota		7,837		
Nationalist	Albert Bruntnell (elected 1)	13,468	43.0	+7.2
Nationalist	Leicester Simpson	2,164	6.9	+6.9
Nationalist	Thomas Morrow (elected 3)	854	2.7	+2.7
Nationalist	Charles Willoughby	330	1.0	+1.0
Labor	Jack Lang (elected 2)	12,906	41.2	−8.3
Labor	Bill Ely (defeated)	821	2.6	+0.3
Labor	George Harrison	185	0.6	+0.6
Independent Labor	Saxon Hurst	347	1.1	+1.1
Independent Labor	James Boughey	158	0.5	+0.5
Independent	John Blake	112	0.4	+0.4
Total formal votes		31,345	96.4	+4.7
Informal votes		1,183	3.6	−4.7
Turnout		32,528	71.4	+14.3
Party total votes
Nationalist		16,816	53.6	+15.0
Labor		13,912	44.4	−8.1
Independent Labor	Saxon Hurst	347	1.1	+1.1
Independent Labor	James Boughey	158	0.5	+0.5
Independent	John Blake	112	0.4	+0.4

=== Ryde ===
1922 New South Wales state election: Ryde
Party	Candidate	Votes	%	±%
Quota		9,454		
Nationalist	Thomas Henley (elected 1)	16,007	28.2	+5.9
Nationalist	David Anderson (elected 2)	7,732	13.6	+5.2
Nationalist	Edward Loxton (elected 3)	6,866	12.1	−4.5
Nationalist	Thomas Bavin (elected 5)	4,946	8.7	+8.7
Nationalist	Norman McIntosh	3,260	5.7	+5.7
Nationalist	Herbert Small	2,066	3.6	+3.6
Labor	Robert Greig (elected 4)	8,238	14.5	+5.9
Labor	William Hutchison	4,969	8.8	−0.5
Labor	John English	574	1.0	+1.0
Labor	Thomas Maher	401	0.7	+0.7
Labor	Alexander Mackie	323	0.6	+0.6
Progressive	Ernest Thompson	923	1.6	+1.6
Independent	John Pattison	415	0.7	+0.7
Total formal votes		56,720	97.1	+8.1
Informal votes		1,664	2.9	−8.1
Turnout		58,384	74.3	+17.1
Party total votes
Nationalist		40,877	72.1	+32.6
Labor		14,505	25.6	−2.8
Progressive	Ernest Thompson	923	1.6	−10.2
Independent	John Pattison	415	0.7	+0.7

=== St George ===
1922 New South Wales state election: St George
Party	Candidate	Votes	%	±%
Quota		8,832		
Nationalist	Thomas Ley (elected 1)	10,071	19.0	+19.0
Nationalist	Guy Arkins (elected 2)	8,717	16.4	+6.9
Nationalist	William Bagnall (elected 4)	4,829	9.1	−6.2
Nationalist	John Ewen	2,636	5.0	+5.0
Nationalist	Francis Farrar	1,371	2.6	+2.6
Nationalist	John Willson	694	1.3	+1.3
Labor	Mark Gosling (elected 3)	8,423	15.9	+10.5
Labor	George Cann (elected 5)	6,818	12.9	−8.1
Labor	Sam Toombs	4,852	9.2	−0.9
Labor	Patrick Donovan	1,586	3.0	+0.5
Labor	Arthur Jones	610	1.2	+1.2
Progressive	Reginald McDonald	1,999	3.8	+3.8
Progressive	John Cordell	126	0.2	+0.2
Progressive	John Wilson	80	0.1	+0.1
Independent	John Cooper	98	0.2	+0.2
Independent	Henry Short	62	0.1	+0.1
Independent	John Gager	17	0.03	+0.03
Total formal votes		52,989	96.4	+6.0
Informal votes		1,963	3.6	−6.0
Turnout		54,952	73.5	+15.9
Party total votes
Nationalist		28,318	53.4	+21.1
Labor		22,289	42.1	+0.4
Progressive		2,205	4.2	−13.5
Independent	John Cooper	98	0.2	+0.2
Independent	Henry Short	62	0.1	+0.1
Independent	John Gager	17	0.03	+0.03

=== Sturt ===
1922 New South Wales state election: Sturt
Party	Candidate	Votes	%	±%
Quota		4,371		
Labor	Mat Davidson (elected 1)	5,472	31.3	+7.1
Labor	Jabez Wright (elected 3)	1,922	11.0	−7.4
Labor	Ted Horsington	708	4.1	+4.1
Nationalist	Brian Doe (elected 2)	3,401	19.5	−5.1
Nationalist	William Daish	1,670	9.5	+9.5
Nationalist	John Wicks	707	4.0	+4.0
Industrial Labor	Donald Grant	1,378	7.9	+7.9
Independent	Ernest Wetherell	856	4.9	+4.9
Independent	William Couch	785	4.5	+4.5
Progressive	Walter O'Grady	505	2.9	+2.9
Independent	Charles Dooley	76	0.4	+0.4
Total formal votes		17,480	94.5	+2.4
Informal votes		1,013	5.5	−2.4
Turnout		18,493	59.4	+9.7
Party total votes
Labor		8,102	46.4	+0.7
Nationalist		5,778	33.0	+6.8
Industrial Labor		1,378	7.9	+7.9
Independent	Ernest Wetherell	856	4.9	+4.9
Independent	William Couch	785	4.5	+4.5
Progressive		505	2.9	+2.9
Independent	Charles Dooley	76	0.4	+0.4

=== Sydney ===
1922 New South Wales state election: Sydney
Party	Candidate	Votes	%	±%
Quota		6,351		
Labor	Greg McGirr (elected 1)	6,304	16.6	+16.6
Labor	John Birt (elected 4)	5,433	14.3	0.0
Labor	Patrick Minahan (elected 5)	3,756	9.9	+0.3
Labor	Michael Burke (defeated)	3,589	9.4	−0.6
Labor	George Mullins	1,718	4.5	+4.5
Nationalist	Joseph Jackson (elected 2)	4,864	12.8	+2.9
Nationalist	Daniel Levy (elected 3)	3,178	8.3	−9.8
Nationalist	Richard Caldwell	1,929	5.1	+5.1
Nationalist	Ernest Salmon	1,672	4.4	+4.4
Nationalist	Ernest Marks	1,618	4.2	+4.2
Nationalist	William Nicholls	247	0.6	+0.6
Independent	Ben Fuller	3,000	7.9	+7.9
Independent	Edward Price	227	0.6	+0.6
Independent	Henry Jones	166	0.4	+0.4
Industrial Labor	William McCristal	98	0.3	+0.3
Independent	Richard Allen	83	0.2	+0.2
Independent	Sydney Brown	48	0.1	+0.1
Independent	Alfred Bartlett	36	0.1	+0.1
Independent	Albert Clifton	28	0.1	+0.1
Independent	Charles Tuck	28	0.1	+0.1
Independent	Edwin Miller	25	0.1	+0.1
Independent	William Pickup	19	0.1	+0.1
Independent	Solomon Rosenberg	14	0.04	+0.04
Independent	Robert Williams	11	0.03	+0.03
Independent	Ernest Llewelyn	11	0.03	+0.03
Total formal votes		38,102	95.7	+11.0
Informal votes		1,714	4.3	−11.0
Turnout		39,816	58.1	+13.7
Party total votes
Labor		20,800	54.6	+1.0
Nationalist		13,508	35.4	+7.3
Independent	Ben Fuller	3,000	7.9	+7.9
Independent	Edward Price	227	0.6	+0.6
Independent	Henry Jones	166	0.4	+0.4
Industrial Labor		98	0.3	+0.3
Independent	Richard Allen	83	0.2	+0.2
Independent	Sydney Brown	48	0.1	+0.1
Independent	Alfred Bartlett	36	0.1	+0.1
Independent	Albert Clifton	28	0.1	+0.1
Independent	Charles Tuck	28	0.1	+0.1
Independent	Edwin Miller	25	0.1	+0.1
Independent	William Pickup	19	0.1	+0.1
Independent	Solomon Rosenberg	14	0.04	+0.04
Independent	Robert Williams	11	0.03	+0.03
Independent	Ernest Llewelyn	11	0.03	+0.03

=== Wammerawa ===
1922 New South Wales state election: Wammerawa
Party	Candidate	Votes	%	±%
Quota		6,571		
Labor	Bill Dunn (elected 1)	6,854	26.1	−13.6
Labor	Joseph Clark (defeated)	4,810	18.3	+8.8
Labor	William Webster	821	3.1	−1.1
Progressive	Harold Thorby (elected 2)	2,855	10.9	+0.4
Progressive	Gordon Wilkins	2,522	9.6	+9.6
Progressive	George Oram	930	3.5	+3.5
Progressive	James Berryman	726	2.8	+2.8
Progressive	Edward Scully	366	1.4	+1.4
Progressive	Edward Kater	266	1.0	+1.0
Nationalist	Percy Shortland	1,386	5.3	+5.3
Nationalist	John Macdonald	1,314	5.0	+5.0
Nationalist	John Wark	516	2.0	+2.0
Independent	William Ashford (elected 3)	2,891	11.0	+11.0
Independent	Arthur Heany	23	0.1	+0.1
Total formal votes		26,280	96.3	+4.2
Informal votes		1,001	3.7	−4.2
Turnout		27,281	71.3	+8.0
Party total votes
Labor		12,485	47.5	−5.9
Progressive		7,665	29.2	+8.3
Nationalist		3,216	12.2	−12.0
Independent	William Ashford	2,891	11.0	+11.0
Independent	Arthur Heany	23	0.1	+0.1

==== Petition and recount ====
Joseph Clark petitioned the Governor against the return of William Ashford, alleging that the returning officer made an error in calculating the transfer value for the distribution of surplus to quota votes. The Committee of Elections and Qualifications upheld the petition, overturning the election of Ashford and declaring that Clark was elected as the member for Wammerawa.

=== Western Suburbs ===
1922 New South Wales state election: Western Suburbs
Party	Candidate	Votes	%	±%
Quota		8,274		
Nationalist	Tom Hoskins (elected 3)	8,127	16.4	+3.3
Nationalist	John Ness (elected 4)	8,055	16.2	+16.2
Nationalist	James Wilson (elected 5)	7,082	14.3	+14.3
Nationalist	Sydney Shillington (defeated)	3,912	7.9	−3.3
Nationalist	William Simpson	1,554	3.1	+3.1
Labor	Edward McTiernan (elected 1)	9,598	19.3	+8.7
Labor	Carlo Lazzarini (elected 2)	6,986	14.1	+0.3
Labor	James Stewart	672	1.4	+1.4
Labor	Harold Macdonald	499	1.0	+1.0
Labor	Joseph Smith	97	0.2	+0.2
Progressive	Alexander Huie	2,670	5.4	+5.4
Progressive	Clare Wilson	388	0.8	+0.8
Total formal votes		49,640	96.9	+7.9
Informal votes		1,582	3.1	−7.9
Turnout		51,222	74.0	+16.2
Party total votes
Nationalist		28,730	57.9	+21.8
Labor		17,852	36.0	−0.4
Progressive		3,058	6.2	−2.0

=== Wollondilly ===
1922 New South Wales state election: Wollondilly
Party	Candidate	Votes	%	±%
Quota		7,222		
Nationalist	Sir George Fuller (elected 1)	11,507	39.8	+11.6
Nationalist	Mark Morton (elected 3)	3,229	11.2	−6.5
Nationalist	Samuel Emmett	647	2.2	+2.2
Labor	Billy Davies (elected 2)	8,208	28.4	−9.5
Labor	John Cleary (defeated)	4,158	14.4	+6.5
Labor	Walter Thompson	100	0.4	+0.4
Progressive	William Howarth	711	2.5	+2.5
Independent	Arthur Silvey-Reardon	324	1.1	−0.6
Total formal votes		28,884	96.3	+2.2
Informal votes		1,121	3.7	−2.2
Turnout		30,005	75.4	+14.9
Party total votes
Nationalist		15,383	53.2	+7.3
Labor		12,466	43.2	−9.2
Progressive		711	2.5	+2.5
Independent	Arthur Silvey-Reardon	324	1.1	−0.6

== See also ==
- Candidates of the 1922 New South Wales state election
- Members of the New South Wales Legislative Assembly, 1922–1925
