= Results of the 1920 New South Wales state election =

State election for New South Wales, Australia in March 1920

1920 New South Wales state election Legislative Assembly << 1917–1922 >>
Enrolled voters	1,154,437				
Votes cast	648,709		Turnout	56.19	−5.24
Informal votes	62,900		Informal	9.70	+8.68
Summary of votes by party
Party	Primary votes	%	Swing	Seats	Change
Labor	252,371	43.08	+0.45	43	+10
Nationalist	175,280	29.92	−17.52	28	−24
Progressive	88,557	15.12	+15.12	15	+15
Independent (Note: Includes Independent Labor.)	28,410	4.85	−2.55	1	–3
Democratic	14,026	2.39	+2.39	0	
Soldiers & Citizens	10,055	1.72	+1.72	0	
Ind. Nationalist	9,357	1.60	–0.87	2	+1
Socialist Labor	6,143	1.05	+0.99	1	+1
Women's	1,610	0.27	+0.27	0	
Total	585,809			90	

The 1920 New South Wales state election was for 90 seats representing 24 electoral districts, with each district returning between 3 and 5 members. This was the first election in New South Wales that took place under a modified Hare-Clark voting system. The average number of enrolled voters per member was 12,805, ranging from Sturt (11,539) to Sydney (13,478).

== Results by electoral district ==
=== Balmain ===
1920 New South Wales state election: Balmain
Party	Candidate	Votes	%	±%
Quota		5,147		
Labor	John Storey (elected 1)	7,527	24.4	
Labor	John Quirk (elected 3)	3,137	10.2	
Labor	Robert Stuart-Robertson (elected 4)	2,821	9.1	
Labor	Tom Keegan (defeated)	2,603	8.4	
Labor	John Doyle (elected 2)	2,336	7.6	
Nationalist	Robert Stopford	3,911	12.7	
Nationalist	Albert Smith (elected 5)	3,016	9.8	
Soldiers & Citizens	Campbell Carmichael (defeated)	2,590	8.4	
Soldiers & Citizens	George Saunders	100	0.3	
Soldiers & Citizens	Charles Shields	28	0.1	
Democratic	Charles Lawlor	2,252	7.3	
Socialist Labor	William Corcoran	81	0.3	
Socialist Labor	James Moroney	59	0.2	
Socialist Labor	Peter Christensen	26	0.1	
Socialist Labor	Herbert Weston	13	0.1	
Independent	Arthur Griffith	165	0.5	
Independent	Henry Levy	93	0.3	
Independent	Solomon Amein	60	0.2	
Independent	George Nielsen	60	0.2	
Total formal votes		30,878	86.4	
Informal votes		4,845	13.6	
Turnout		35,723	54.3	
Party total votes
Labor		18,424	59.7	
Nationalist		6,927	22.4	
Soldiers & Citizens		2,718	8.8	
Democratic		2,252	7.3	
Socialist Labor		179	0.6	
Independent	Arthur Griffith	165	0.5	
Independent	Henry Levy	93	0.3	
Independent	Solomon Amein	60	0.2	
Independent	George Nielsen	60	0.2	

=== Bathurst ===
1920 New South Wales state election: Bathurst
Party	Candidate	Votes	%	±%
Quota		5,912		
Labor	James Dooley (elected 1)	7,380	31.2	
Labor	Valentine Johnston (elected 3)	5,224	22.1	
Labor	John Gilchrist	88	0.4	
Nationalist	John Fitzpatrick (elected 2)	6,029	25.5	
Nationalist	Henry Camfield	1,723	7.3	
Progressive	Arthur Brown	1,888	8.0	
Progressive	Albert Rogers	1,244	5.3	
Independent	James McIntyre	70	0.3	
Total formal votes		23,646	94.8	
Informal votes		1,285	5.2	
Turnout		24,931	62.4	
Party total votes
Labor		12,692	53.7	
Nationalist		7,752	32.8	
Progressive		3,132	13.2	
Independent	James McIntyre	70	0.3	

=== Botany ===
1920 New South Wales state election: Botany
Party	Candidate	Votes	%	±%
Quota		4,749		
Labor	Thomas Mutch (elected 1)	5,781	20.3	
Labor	Frank Burke (elected 2)	4,685	16.4	
Labor	William McKell (elected 3)	4,379	15.4	
Labor	Simon Hickey (elected 5)	2,883	10.1	
Labor	Bill Ratcliffe	1,351	4.7	
Nationalist	John Lee (elected 4)	4,499	15.8	
Nationalist	James Morrish	1,132	4.0	
Democratic	Edward Connell	2,179	7.7	
Progressive	Philip Strange-Mure	319	1.1	
Progressive	Charles Coghlan	183	0.6	
Socialist Labor	Annie Toohey	173	0.6	
Socialist Labor	Timothy McCristal	123	0.4	
Socialist Labor	Henry Denford	53	0.2	
Socialist Labor	John Jamieson	44	0.2	
Independent	Stanley McGowen	339	1.2	
Soldiers & Citizens	Charles Banks	255	0.9	
Soldiers & Citizens	Christopher Evers	60	0.2	
Independent	Patrick Quinn	33	0.1	
Independent	George Crowley	19	0.1	
Total formal votes		28,490	84.5	
Informal votes		5,215	15.5	
Turnout		33,705	51.8	
Party total votes
Labor		19,079	67.0	
Nationalist		5,631	19.8	
Democratic		2,179	7.7	
Progressive		502	1.8	
Socialist Labor		393	1.4	
Independent	Stanley McGowen	339	1.2	
Soldiers & Citizens		315	1.1	
Independent	Patrick Quinn	33	0.1	
Independent	George Crowley	19	0.1	

=== Byron ===
1920 New South Wales state election: Byron
Party	Candidate	Votes	%	±%
Quota		5,103		
Nationalist	George Nesbitt (elected 1)	4,815	23.6	
Nationalist	William Zuill (defeated)	1,901	9.3	
Progressive	Stephen Perdriau (elected 2)	3,384	16.6	
Progressive	William Missingham	2,092	10.2	
Progressive	Duncan Nicholson	750	3.7	
Labor	Tom Swiney (elected 3)	3,992	19.6	
Labor	Roger Ryan	257	1.3	
Independent	James McDougall	1,385	6.8	
Independent	Percy Tighe	1,119	5.5	
Independent	John Yates	646	3.2	
Independent	William McKeever	43	0.2	
Independent	Thomas Winterton	25	0.1	
Total formal votes		20,409	93.1	
Informal votes		1,516	6.9	
Turnout		21,925	55.7	
Party total votes
Nationalist		6,716	32.9	
Progressive		6,226	30.5	
Labor		4,249	20.7	
Independent	James McDougall	1,385	6.8	
Independent	Percy Tighe	1,119	5.5	
Independent	John Yates	646	3.2	
Independent	William McKeever	43	0.2	
Independent	Thomas Winterton	25	0.1	

=== Cootamundra ===
1920 New South Wales state election: Cootamundra
Party	Candidate	Votes	%	±%
Quota		6,325		
Labor	Greg McGirr (elected 1)	6,895	27.3	
Labor	Peter Loughlin (elected 2)	6,498	25.7	
Labor	Charles Trefle	452	1.8	
Progressive	Hugh Main (elected 3)	3,537	14.0	
Progressive	John Fitzpatrick	1,831	7.2	
Progressive	Hugh Brown	1,681	6.7	
Nationalist	William Holman (defeated)	4,199	16.6	
Nationalist	Arthur D'Arcy	204	0.8	
Total formal votes		25,297	95.1	
Informal votes		1,309	4.9	
Turnout		26,606	66.9	
Party total votes
Labor		13,845	54.7	
Progressive		7,049	27.9	
Nationalist		4,403	17.4	

=== Cumberland ===
1920 New South Wales state election: Cumberland
Party	Candidate	Votes	%	±%
Quota		4,655		
Nationalist	Bruce Walker Sr (elected 2)	4,142	22.2	
Nationalist	Ernest Carr (elected 3)	2,520	13.5	
Nationalist	William FitzSimons	2,364	12.7	
Labor	Voltaire Molesworth (elected 1)	4,315	23.2	
Labor	Albert Jones	1,096	5.9	
Labor	Francis Lagerlow	259	1.4	
Soldiers & Citizens	Charles Hely	442	2.4	
Soldiers & Citizens	William Armstrong	334	1.8	
Independent	William Crittenden	681	3.7	
Total formal votes		18,617	92.4	
Informal votes		1,539	7.6	
Turnout		20,156	54.3	
Party total votes
Nationalist		9,026	48.5	
Labor		5,670	30.5	
Progressive		2,464	13.2	
Soldiers & Citizens		776	4.2	
Independent	William Crittenden	681	3.7	

=== Eastern Suburbs ===
1920 New South Wales state election: Eastern Suburbs
Party	Candidate	Votes	%	±%
Quota		4,938		
Nationalist	Harold Jaques (elected 2)	4,432	15.0	
Nationalist	Charles Oakes (elected 1)	4,422	14.9	
Nationalist	Charles Williams	2,718	9.2	
Nationalist	Henry Rogers	1,190	4.0	
Nationalist	James Mullaney	51	0.2	
Labor	Bob O'Halloran (elected 4)	3,248	11.0	
Labor	James Fingleton (elected 3)	2,152	7.3	
Labor	Scott Campbell (Note: Patrick Minahan and Scott Campbell were nominated by the Labor Party, however their endorsement was withdrawn before the polling day because they signed a pledge for the unconditional release of twelve imprisoned members of the Industrial Workers of the World.)	2,112	7.1	
Labor	Daniel Dwyer	1,263	4.3	
Labor	Walter Humphries	334	1.1	
Progressive	James Macarthur-Onslow (elected 5)	2,870	9.7	
Progressive	Arthur Doran	593	2.0	
Independent	William Ross	2,907	9.8	
Soldiers & Citizens	Grace Scobie	875	3.0	
Soldiers & Citizens	Frederick Winn-Walker	136	0.5	
Soldiers & Citizens	Alexander Hogan	111	0.4	
Soldiers & Citizens	Edgar Spencer	56	0.2	
Independent	Sidney Buckleton	152	0.5	
Total formal votes		29,622	88.5	
Informal votes		3,859	11.5	
Turnout		33,481	51.1	
Party total votes
Nationalist		12,813	43.3	
Labor		9,109	30.8	
Progressive		3,463	11.7	
Independent	William Ross	2,907	9.8	
Soldiers & Citizens		1,178	4.0	
Independent	Sidney Buckleton	152	0.5	

=== Goulburn ===
1920 New South Wales state election: Goulburn
Party	Candidate	Votes	%	±%
Quota		5,039		
Labor	John Bailey (elected 1)	7,175	35.6	
Labor	Frank Morgan	413	2.1	
Labor	Richard Macdonald	214	1.1	
Nationalist	Augustus James (elected 2)	3,981	19.7	
Nationalist	William Millard (defeated)	1,943	9.6	
Progressive	Thomas Rutledge (elected 3)	2,361	11.7	
Progressive	Patrick Bourke	779	3.9	
Progressive	William Tomkins	736	3.6	
Independent	Percy Evans	2,023	10.0	
Independent	John Brogan	62	0.3	
Independent	Francis Grogan	39	0.2	
Total formal votes		20,152	90.7	
Informal votes		2,061	9.3	
Turnout		22,213	58.3	
Party total votes
Labor		7,802	38.7	
Nationalist		5,924	29.4	
Progressive		4,302	21.3	
Independent	Percy Evans	2,023	10.0	
Independent	John Brogan	62	0.3	
Independent	Francis Grogan	39	0.2	

=== Maitland ===
1920 New South Wales state election: Maitland
Party	Candidate	Votes	%	±%
Quota		4,824		
Labor	Walter O'Hearn (elected 2)	3,477	18.0	
Labor	William Brennan	2,253	11.7	
Labor	Dionysius McGuire	1,419	7.4	
Nationalist	Charles Nicholson (defeated)	3,439	17.8	
Nationalist	William Cameron (elected 3)	1,925	10.0	
Nationalist	Stephen Hungerford	824	4.3	
Progressive	Walter Bennett (elected 1)	3,418	17.7	
Progressive	William Roberts	1,199	6.2	
Progressive	Cecil Tindale	1,162	6.0	
Independent	Joseph Compton	121	0.6	
Independent	Thomas Hays	57	0.3	
Total formal votes		19,294	91.5	
Informal votes		1,785	8.5	
Turnout		21,079	55.3	
Party total votes
Labor		7,149	37.1	
Nationalist		6,188	32.1	
Progressive		5,779	30.0	
Independent	Joseph Compton	121	0.6	
Independent	Thomas Hays	57	0.3	

=== Murray ===
1920 New South Wales state election: Murray
Party	Candidate	Votes	%	±%
Quota		4,959		
Labor	William O'Brien (elected 1)	4,833	24.4	
Labor	Edmund Clear	3,590	18.1	
Labor	Claude Thompson	676	3.4	
Nationalist	Richard Ball (elected 2)	3,957	19.9	
Nationalist	Arthur Manning (defeated)	2,224	11.2	
Progressive	George Beeby (elected 3)	3,810	19.2	
Progressive	Matthew Kilpatrick	742	3.7	
Total formal votes		19,832	93.7	
Informal votes		1,326	6.3	
Turnout		21,158	55.9	
Party total votes
Labor		9,099	45.9	
Nationalist		6,181	31.2	
Progressive		4,552	23.0	

=== Murrumbidgee ===
1920 New South Wales state election: Murrumbidgee
Party	Candidate	Votes	%	±%
Quota		5,267		
Labor	Martin Flannery (elected 1)	3,624	17.2	
Labor	Patrick McGirr (defeated)	3,621	17.2	
Labor	George Bodkin	2,415	11.5	
Progressive	Ernest Buttenshaw (elected 2)	2,387	11.3	
Progressive	William Killen	1,554	7.4	
Progressive	William Adams	1,013	4.8	
Progressive	Herbert Cuthbert	274	1.3	
Nationalist	Arthur Grimm (elected 3)	3,622	17.2	
Independent	Andrew Stewart	2,020	9.6	
Ind. Nationalist	Patrick McGarry (defeated)	512	2.4	
Independent	Herbert Hawkins	22	0.1	
Total formal votes		21,064	90.7	
Informal votes		2,161	9.3	
Turnout		23,225	59.0	
Party total votes
Labor		9,660	45.9	
Progressive		5,228	24.8	
Nationalist		3,622	17.2	
Independent	Andrew Stewart	2,020	9.6	
Ind. Nationalist	Patrick McGarry	512	2.4	
Independent	Herbert Hawkins	22	0.1	

=== Namoi ===
1920 New South Wales state election: Namoi
Party	Candidate	Votes	%	±%
Quota		5,432		
Labor	Patrick Scully (elected 1)	8,007	36.9	
Labor	Thomas Boland	592	2.7	
Labor	William Scully	396	1.8	
Nationalist	Frank Chaffey (elected 2)	2,848	13.1	
Nationalist	John Crane (defeated)	2,605	12.0	
Progressive	Walter Wearne (elected 3)	3,244	14.9	
Progressive	Frank Heywood	969	4.5	
Progressive	Charles Woollett	754	3.5	
Independent	Robert Levien	2,309	10.6	
Total formal votes		21,724	93.5	
Informal votes		1,517	6.5	
Turnout		23,241	61.7	
Party total votes
Labor		8,995	41.4	
Nationalist		5,453	25.1	
Progressive		4,967	22.9	
Independent	Robert Levien	2,309	10.6	

=== Newcastle ===
1920 New South Wales state election: Newcastle
Party	Candidate	Votes	%	±%
Quota		5,475		
Labor	Hugh Connell (elected 1)	6,720	20.5	
Labor	John Estell (elected 3)	4,998	15.2	
Labor	William Kearsley (elected 4)	3,641	11.1	
Labor	David Murray	2,145	6.5	
Labor	Amram Lewis	1,381	4.2	
Independent	Arthur Gardiner (elected 2)	5,821	17.7	
Nationalist	John Fegan (elected 5)	2,113	6.4	
Nationalist	John Paton	1,840	5.6	
Nationalist	George O'Brien	289	0.9	
Progressive	Roland Green	1,064	3.2	
Democratic	Robert Mackenzie	947	2.9	
Ind. Nationalist	William C Grahame (defeated)	898	2.7	
Socialist Labor	Joseph Charlton	564	1.7	
Socialist Labor	David McNeill	140	0.4	
Socialist Labor	Thomas Johnston	68	0.2	
Socialist Labor	John McDonald	62	0.2	
Socialist Labor	William North	53	0.2	
Independent	Michael Dillon	91	0.3	
Independent	John Kingsborough	13	0.1	
Total formal votes		32,848	87.6	
Informal votes		4,648	12.4	
Turnout		37,496	59.1	
Party total votes
Labor		18,885	57.5	
Independent	Arthur Gardiner	5,821	17.7	
Nationalist		4,242	12.9	
Progressive		1,064	3.2	
Democratic		947	2.9	
Ind. Nationalist	William C Grahame	898	2.7	
Socialist Labor		887	2.7	
Independent	Michael Dillon	91	0.3	
Independent	John Kingsborough	13	0.1	

=== North Shore ===
1920 New South Wales state election: North Shore
Party	Candidate	Votes	%	±%
Quota		5,211		
Nationalist	Reginald Weaver (elected 1)	4,786	15.3	
Nationalist	Richard Arthur (elected 3)	4,425	14.2	
Nationalist	Arthur Cocks (elected 4)	2,492	8.0	
Nationalist	Percy Colquhoun (defeated)	1,873	6.0	
Nationalist	Richard Lambton	773	2.5	
Labor	Cecil Murphy (elected 2)	2,461	7.9	
Labor	Henry Willis	1,181	3.8	
Labor	Alexander Campbell	1,132	3.6	
Labor	Alfred Warton	557	1.8	
Labor	Albert Roberts	395	1.3	
Progressive	Arthur Walker	1,752	5.6	
Progressive	Frank Farnell	451	1.4	
Progressive	Francis Killeen	376	1.2	
Progressive	Archie Ogilvy	139	0.4	
Ind. Nationalist	Alfred Reid (elected 5)	2,628	8.4	
Democratic	Timothy O'Donoghue	2,297	7.4	
Women's Party (1920)	Mary Booth	1,610	5.2	
Soldiers & Citizens	Edward Cortis	692	2.2	
Soldiers & Citizens	Richard Fitz-Gerald	341	1.1	
Independent	Edward Clark	879	2.8	
Independent	Frederick Clancy	20	0.1	
Total formal votes		31,260	88.3	
Informal votes		4,535	12.7	
Turnout		35,795	56.0	
Party total votes
Nationalist		14,349	45.9	
Labor		5,726	18.3	
Progressive		2,718	8.7	
Ind. Nationalist	Alfred Reid	2,628	8.4	
Democratic		2,297	7.4	
Women's Party (1920)		1,610	5.2	
Soldiers & Citizens		1,033	3.3	
Independent	Edward Clark	879	2.8	
Independent	Frederick Clancy	20	0.1	

=== Northern Tableland ===
1920 New South Wales state election: Northern Tableland
Party	Candidate	Votes	%	±%
Quota		4,853		
Progressive	Michael Bruxner (elected 2)	4,553	23.5	
Progressive	David Drummond (elected 3)	1,949	10.0	
Progressive	Follet Thomas (defeated)	1,506	7.8	
Progressive	John Crapp	864	4.5	
Progressive	Patrick Little	644	3.3	
Labor	Alfred McClelland (elected 1)	5,729	29.5	
Labor	Joseph Byrne	1,499	7.7	
Nationalist	Herbert Lane (defeated)	2,199	11.3	
Nationalist	Leonard Francis	468	2.4	
Total formal votes		19,411	93.6	
Informal votes		1,320	6.4	
Turnout		20,731	57.4	
Party total votes
Progressive		9,516	49.0	
Labor		7,228	37.2	
Nationalist		2,667	13.7	

=== Oxley ===
1920 New South Wales state election: Oxley
Party	Candidate	Votes	%	±%
Quota		4,773		
Progressive	George Briner (elected 1)	5,000	26.2	
Progressive	Richard Price (elected 3)	3,784	19.8	
Progressive	Theodore Hill	1,757	9.2	
Labor	Joseph Fitzgerald (elected 2)	4,430	23.2	
Labor	John Culbert	243	1.3	
Labor	Robert Pinkerton	77	0.4	
Nationalist	Henry Morton (defeated)	3,437	18.0	
Independent	Edward Hill	273	1.4	
Independent	Eugene Rudder	87	0.5	
Total formal votes		19,088	93.4	
Informal votes		1,348	6.6	
Turnout		20,436	53.2	
Party total votes
Progressive		10,541	55.2	
Labor		4,750	24.9	
Nationalist		3,437	18.0	
Independent	Edward Hill	273	1.4	
Independent	Eugene Rudder	87	0.5	

=== Parramatta ===
1920 New South Wales state election: Parramatta
Party	Candidate	Votes	%	±%
Quota		5,119		
Labor	Jack Lang (elected 1)	10,134	49.5	
Labor	Bill Ely (elected 3)	477	2.3	
Labor	Edward Pomfret	128	0.6	
Nationalist	Albert Bruntnell (elected 2)	7,325	35.8	
Nationalist	Frederick Parkes	572	2.8	
Democratic	Alexander Finn	778	3.8	
Soldiers & Citizens	James Thomson	418	2.0	
Soldiers & Citizens	Francis Silverstone	179	0.9	
Soldiers & Citizens	Richard Yeend	97	0.5	
Independent	Harry Moss	366	1.8	
Total formal votes		20,474	91.7	
Informal votes		1,846	8.3	
Turnout		22,320	57.1	
Party total votes
Labor		10,739	52.5	
Nationalist		7,897	38.6	
Democratic		778	3.8	
Soldiers & Citizens		694	3.4	
Independent	Harry Moss	366	1.8	

=== Ryde ===
1920 New South Wales state election: Ryde
Party	Candidate	Votes	%	±%
Quota		5,344		
Nationalist	Thomas Henley (elected 1)	7,150	22.3	
Nationalist	David Anderson (elected 3)	2,697	8.4	
Nationalist	Sydney Herring	1,915	6.0	
Nationalist	Herbert Small	898	2.8	
Labor	William Hutchison	2,987	9.3	
Labor	Robert Greig (elected 5)	2,866	8.9	
Labor	Henry Douglass	1,648	5.1	
Labor	Vernon Jarvis	1,013	3.2	
Labor	Ernest Sheiles	597	1.9	
Ind. Nationalist	Edward Loxton (elected 2)	5,319	16.6	
Progressive	Thomas Bavin (elected 4)	2,525	7.9	
Progressive	Benjamin Gelling	1,246	3.9	
Soldiers & Citizens	Maurice Dearn	354	1.1	
Soldiers & Citizens	Charles Laseron	241	0.8	
Soldiers & Citizens	David Morgan	198	0.6	
Soldiers & Citizens	John Pattison	149	0.5	
Soldiers & Citizens	Francis Russell	143	0.5	
Independent	Henry Bernard	93	0.3	
Independent	Robin Levick	22	0.1	
Total formal votes		32,061	89.0	
Informal votes		3,976	11.0	
Turnout		36,037	57.2	
Party total votes
Nationalist		12,660	39.5	
Labor		9,111	28.4	
Ind. Nationalist	Edward Loxton	5,319	16.6	
Progressive		3,771	11.8	
Soldiers & Citizens		1,085	3.4	
Independent	Henry Bernard	93	0.3	
Independent	Robin Levick	22	0.1	

=== St George ===
1920 New South Wales state election: St George
Party	Candidate	Votes	%	±%
Quota		5,569		
Labor	George Cann (elected 1)	7,026	21.0	
Labor	Sam Toombs	3,384	10.1	
Labor	Mark Gosling (elected 5)	1,800	5.4	
Labor	William Gibbs	877	2.6	
Labor	Patrick Donovan	842	2.5	
Nationalist	William Bagnall (elected 3)	5,103	15.3	
Nationalist	Guy Arkins (elected 4)	3,191	9.5	
Nationalist	Frederick Reed	2,497	7.5	
Progressive	Thomas Ley (elected 2)	4,440	13.3	
Progressive	Charles Rosenthal	1,485	4.4	
Democratic	William O'Driscoll	2,227	6.7	
Soldiers & Citizens	Charles Church	177	0.5	
Soldiers & Citizens	Charles Rider	69	0.2	
Independent	Joseph Andrew	222	0.7	
Independent	Sydney Cook	70	0.2	
Total formal votes		33,410	90.4	
Informal votes		3,545	9.6	
Turnout		36,955	57.6	
Party total votes
Labor		13,929	41.7	
Nationalist		10,791	32.3	
Progressive		5,925	17.7	
Democratic		2,227	6.7	
Soldiers & Citizens		246	0.7	
Independent	Joseph Andrew	222	0.7	
Independent	Sydney Cook	70	0.2	

=== Sturt ===
1920 New South Wales state election: Sturt
Party	Candidate	Votes	%	±%
Quota		3,958		
Labor	Mat Davidson (elected 3)	3,824	24.2	
Labor	Jabez Wright (defeated)	2,917	18.4	
Labor	Walter Webb	492	3.1	
Socialist Labor	Percy Brookfield (Note: The New South Wales Election Results database, lists Brookfield as the only socialist with Hynes and O'Reilly listed as independents. Contemporary accounts show Brookfield, Hynes and O'Reilly as all being supported by the Amalgamated Miners Association political league, then under the banner of the Socialist Labor Party, which subsequently split to become the Industrial Labor Party.) (elected 1)	4,357	27.5	
Socialist Labor	Thomas Hynes	55	0.4	
Socialist Labor	John O'Reilly	34	0.2	
Nationalist	Brian Doe (elected 2)	3,890	24.6	
Nationalist	Frank Wilkinson	207	1.3	
Nationalist	John Thorn	53	0.3	
Total formal votes		15,829	92.1	
Informal votes		1,358	7.9	
Turnout		17,187	49.7	
Party total votes
Labor		7,233	45.7	
Socialist Labor		4,446	28.1	
Nationalist		4,150	26.2	

=== Sydney ===
1920 New South Wales state election: Sydney
Party	Candidate	Votes	%	±%
Quota		4,224		
Labor	John Birt (elected 2)	3,613	14.3	
Labor	Arthur Buckley (elected 4)	2,987	11.8	
Labor	Michael Burke (elected 5)	2,529	10.0	
Labor	Patrick Minahan (elected 3)	2,425	9.6	
Labor	Tom Smith (defeated)	2,016	8.0	
Nationalist	Daniel Levy (elected 1)	4,599	18.1	
Nationalist	Joseph Jackson	2,513	9.9	
Independent	Richard Meagher	2,115	8.4	
Democratic	Patrick Cleary	1,654	6.5	
Socialist Labor	Ernie Judd	282	1.1	
Socialist Labor	Daisy Loughran	45	0.2	
Soldiers & Citizens	Charles Smith	134	0.5	
Soldiers & Citizens	James Ritchie	88	0.4	
Soldiers & Citizens	John Clasby	84	0.3	
Independent	William Thomas	119	0.5	
Independent	Alfred Bartlett	102	0.4	
Independent	Patrick Craddock	18	0.1	
Independent	Joseph Sydney	12	0.1	
Independent	Edwin Miller	3	0.0	
Independent	John O'Sullivan	3	0.0	
Total formal votes		25,341	84.7	
Informal votes		4,579	15.3	
Turnout		29,920	44.4	
Party total votes
Labor		13,570	53.5	
Nationalist		7,112	28.1	
Independent	Richard Meagher	2,115	8.4	
Democratic		1,654	6.5	
Socialist Labor		327	1.3	
Soldiers & Citizens		306	1.2	
Independent	William Thomas	119	0.5	
Independent	Alfred Bartlett	102	0.4	
Independent	Patrick Craddock	18	0.1	
Independent	Joseph Sydney	12	0.1	
Independent	Edwin Miller	3	0.0	
Independent	John O'Sullivan	3	0.0	

=== Wammerawa ===
1920 New South Wales state election: Wammerawa
Party	Candidate	Votes	%	±%
Quota		5,610		
Labor	Bill Dunn (elected 1)	8,912	39.7	
Labor	Joseph Clark (elected 3)	2,138	9.5	
Labor	William Webster	931	4.2	
Nationalist	William Ashford (elected 2)	5,166	23.0	
Nationalist	Sidney Skuthorpe	269	1.2	
Progressive	Harold Thorby	2,355	10.5	
Progressive	Neil McLennan	1,206	5.4	
Progressive	William Harris	1,137	5.1	
Independent	Sydney Webb	178	0.8	
Independent	William Kelk	109	0.5	
Independent	Edwin Utley	37	0.2	
Total formal votes		22,438	92.1	
Informal votes		1,920	7.9	
Turnout		24,358	63.3	
Party total votes
Labor		11,981	53.4	
Nationalist		5,435	24.2	
Progressive		4,698	20.9	
Independent	Sydney Webb	178	0.8	
Independent	William Kelk	109	0.5	
Independent	Edwin Utley	37	0.2	

=== Western Suburbs ===
1920 New South Wales state election: Western Suburbs
Party	Candidate	Votes	%	±%
Quota		5,397		
Labor	Carlo Lazzarini (elected 1)	4,457	13.8	
Labor	Edward McTiernan (elected 2)	3,419	10.6	
Labor	Frederick McDonald	1,821	5.6	
Labor	Barney Olde	1,089	3.4	
Labor	John Sheils	993	3.1	
Nationalist	Tom Hoskins (elected 3)	4,236	13.1	
Nationalist	Sydney Shillington (elected 4)	3,643	11.2	
Nationalist	David Doull	2,064	6.4	
Nationalist	Henry Garling	1,759	5.4	
Progressive	James Wilson (elected 5)	2,423	7.5	
Progressive	Frederick Robins	237	0.7	
Soldiers & Citizens	John Ness	1,173	3.6	
Soldiers & Citizens	Stanley Gelling	216	0.7	
Soldiers & Citizens	Thomas McVittie	207	0.6	
Soldiers & Citizens	John Weekley	108	0.3	
Democratic	Daniel Noon	1,692	5.2	
Independent	Alexander Huie	1,268	3.9	
Independent	Benjamin Richards	813	2.5	
Independent	Peter Bowling	746	2.3	
Independent	Claude Sugden	16	0.1	
Total formal votes		32,380	89.0	
Informal votes		4,006	11.0	
Turnout		36,386	57.8	
Party total votes
Labor		11,779	36.4	
Nationalist		11,702	36.1	
Progressive		2,660	8.2	
Soldiers & Citizens		1,704	5.3	
Democratic		1,692	5.2	
Independent	Alexander Huie	1,268	3.9	
Independent	Benjamin Richards	813	2.5	
Independent	Peter Bowling	746	2.3	
Independent	Claude Sugden	16	0.1	

=== Wollondilly ===
1920 New South Wales state election: Wollondilly
Party	Candidate	Votes	%	±%
Quota		5,562		
Labor	Billy Davies (elected 1)	8,440	37.9	
Labor	John Cleary (elected 3)	1,756	7.9	
Labor	Daniel Chalker	1,471	6.6	
Nationalist	George Fuller (elected 2)	6,267	28.2	
Nationalist	Mark Morton (defeated)	3,935	17.7	
Independent	Arthur Silvey-Reardon	375	1.7	
Total formal votes		22,244	94.1	
Informal votes		1,401	5.9	
Turnout		23,645	60.5	
Party total votes
Labor		11,667	52.5	
Nationalist		10,202	45.9	
Independent	Arthur Silvey-Reardon	375	1.7	

== See also ==
- Candidates of the 1920 New South Wales state election
- Members of the New South Wales Legislative Assembly, 1920–1922
