= Electoral results for the district of Belmore =

Election results for Belmore, New South Wales, Australia

Belmore, an electoral district of the Legislative Assembly in the Australian state of New South Wales was created in 1904 and abolished in 1920.

Election	Member	Party
1904	Edward O'Sullivan	Progressive
1907	Edward O'Sullivan	Former Progressive / Labor
1910 by	Patrick Minahan	Labor
1910	Patrick Minahan	Labor
1913	Patrick Minahan	Labor
1917	Michael Burke	Labor

== Election results ==
=== Elections in the 1910s ===
==== 1917 ====
1917 New South Wales state election: Belmore
Party	Candidate	Votes	%	±%
Labor	Michael Burke	3,224	66.9	+16.0
Independent Labor	Thomas Barlow	1,596	33.1	+33.1
Total formal votes		4,820	98.5	+1.9
Informal votes		71	1.5	−1.9
Turnout		4,891	48.1	−11.7
Labor hold		Swing	+16.0	

The sitting Labor member for Belmore, Patrick Minahan, lost preselection and unsuccessfully contested Cootamundra against Labor turned Nationalist Premier William Holman.

==== 1913 ====
1913 New South Wales state election: Belmore
Party	Candidate	Votes	%	±%
Labor	Patrick Minahan	3,518	50.9	
Independent Labor	John English	2,500	36.2	
Liberal Reform	John Haynes	887	12.8	
Independent	Forbes Logie	10	0.1	
Total formal votes		6,915	96.6	
Informal votes		242	3.4	
Turnout		7,157	59.8	
Labor hold				

==== 1910 ====
1910 New South Wales state election: Belmore
Party	Candidate	Votes	%	±%
Labour	Patrick Minahan	2,656	50.7	
Independent Labour	John English	2,587	49.3	
Total formal votes		5,243	97.4	−0.9
Informal votes		142	2.6	+0.9
Turnout		5,385	62.1	−0.2
Labour gain from Progressive Party (defunct)				

- Edward O'Sullivan had won Belmore at the 1907 election as a Former Progressive; however, he joined the Labour Party in 1909 and died in April 1910. The by-election in May 1910 was won by Patrick Minahan (Labour) who retained the seat at the 1910 general election.

==== 1910 by-election ====
1910 Belmore by-election Saturday 21 May
Party	Candidate	Votes	%	±%
Labour	Patrick Minahan	1,589	74.6	
Liberal Reform	George Clarke	525	24.6	−5.6
Independent	James Jones	17	0.8	
Total formal votes		2,131	95.7	−1.2
Informal votes		95	4.3	+1.2
Turnout		2,226	27.6 (Note: based on an electoral roll of 8,068 at the 1907 election.)	−39.3
Labour gain from Progressive Party (defunct)				

- Edward O'Sullivan had won Belmore at the 1907 election as a Former Progressive; however, he joined the Labour Party in 1909 and died in April 1910.

=== Elections in the 1900s ===
==== 1907 ====
1907 New South Wales state election: Belmore
Party	Candidate	Votes	%	±%
Former Progressive	Edward O'Sullivan	3,441	69.7	
Liberal Reform	Richard Teece	1,494	30.3	
Total formal votes		4,935	98.3	
Informal votes		87	1.7	
Turnout		5,022	62.3	
Former Progressive hold				

==== 1904 ====
1904 New South Wales state election: Belmore
Party	Candidate	Votes	%	±%
Progressive	Edward O'Sullivan	2,760	51.0	
Liberal Reform	Albert Bruntnell	1,965	36.3	
Independent	Jack FitzGerald	484	8.9	
Independent	George Perry	178	3.3	
Socialist Labor	Thomas Batho	24	0.4	
Total formal votes		5,411	99.3	
Informal votes		38	0.7	
Turnout		5,449	57.1	
Progressive win		(new seat)		

Belmore was a new seat consisted of the abolished seat of Sydney-Belmore and parts of the abolished seats of Sydney-Cook and Sydney-Phillip. The member for Sydney-Belmore was Eden George (Liberal Reform) who successfully contested Ashburnum. The members for Sydney-Cook, Samuel Whiddon (Liberal reform), and Sydney-Phillip, Daniel O'Connor (Progressive), did not contest the election. Edward O'Sullivan (Progressive) was the member for Queanbeyan.
