= 1910 Belmore state by-election =

Election result for Belmore, New South Wales, Australia

A by-election was held for the New South Wales Legislative Assembly electorate of Belmore on 13 May 1910. The by-election was triggered by the death of Edward William O'Sullivan. O'Sullivan was elected as a Former Progressive but joined the Labour Party in 1909.

== Dates ==
| Date | Event |
|---|---|
| 25 April 1910 | Edward O'Sullivan died. |
| 29 April 1910 | Writ of election issued by the Speaker of the Legislative Assembly. |
| 13 May 1910 | Nominations |
| 21 May 1910 | Polling day and 1910 Federal election |
| 7 June 1910 | Return of writ |

== Results ==
1910 Belmore by-election Saturday 21 May
| Party | Candidate | Votes | % | ±% |
|---|---|---|---|---|
| Labour | Patrick Minahan | 1,589 | 74.6 | |
| Liberal Reform | George Clarke | 525 | 24.6 | −5.6 |
| Independent | James Jones | 17 | 0.8 | |
| Total formal votes | | 2,131 | 95.7 | −1.2 |
| Informal votes | | 95 | 4.3 | +1.2 |
| Turnout | | 2,226 | 27.6 (Note: based on an electoral roll of 8,068 at the 1907 election.) | −39.3 |
| Labour gain from Progressive Party (defunct) | | | | |

== See also ==
- Electoral results for the district of Belmore
- List of New South Wales state by-elections
