= Arthur Buckley (disambiguation) =

Arthur Buckley may refer to:

- Arthur Buckley (1891-1974), Australian politician
- Arthur Buckley (footballer) (1913-1992), English footballer, see List of Oldham Athletic A.F.C. players (25–99 appearances)
