= Ellen Webster =

Australian politician

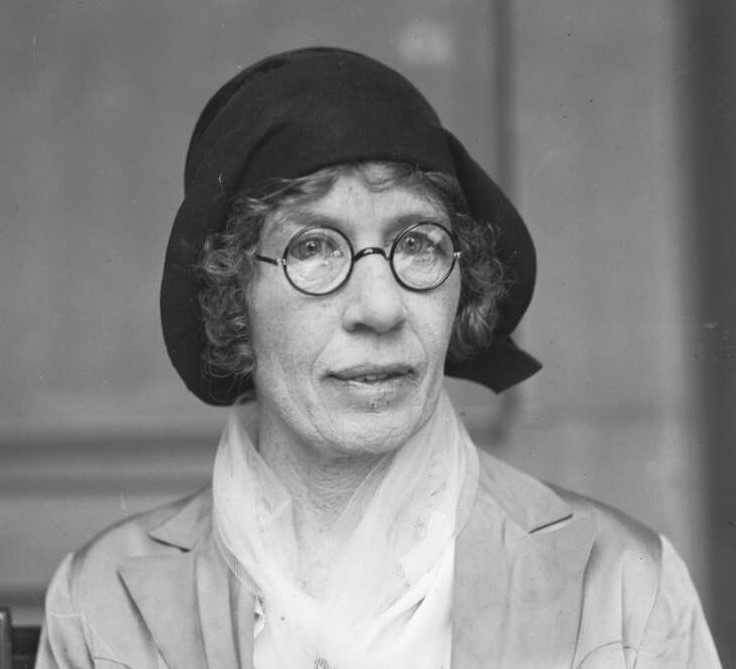
Ellen Webster in 1934

Ellen Webster (14 October 1881 – 20 October 1965) was an Australian politician.

== Life and career ==
Born in Tenterfield in New South Wales to Irish immigrant parents (she was the sixth child of hawker Phillip Callachor and his wife Mary Fitzgerald), she was raised on the family property and educated at home. She later claimed to have studied medicine at the University of Sydney, but this was never proved. By 1920 she was living in Randwick, and she was married on 26 July 1921 to William Maule McDowell Webster at St Patrick's Catholic Church in Sydney. After their marriage, the Websters moved to a farming property at Arcot near Forbes.

From 1927 to 1929 she was a member of the Labor Party central executive, and was delegate to various country conferences. On 26 November 1931 she was appointed to the New South Wales Legislative Council by Premier Jack Lang, joining Catherine Green, appointed two days earlier, as the first women in the council. She remained in the council until 22 April 1934.

After the death of her husband in 1958, Webster ran the family property until the 1960s, when she moved to Sydney to live with her nephew. She died in 1965 and was buried in Randwick Cemetery.
