= Catherine Green =

Australian politician

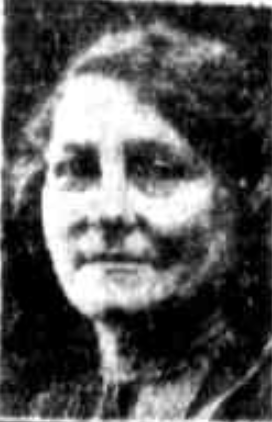
Catherine Green, MLC, c1931

Catherine Elizabeth Green (1 August 1881 – 25 January 1965) was an Australian politician.

Born in Curban in New South Wales to farmer Daniel Diggs and Catherine Kain, she was educated at the Curban public school until the family moved to Dubbo when Catherine was fourteen. She was a domestic in a hotel before moving to Sydney around 1898. On 1 February 1904 she married William John "Billy" Russell, a plumber, with whom she had a daughter and three sons. Her sons, Jim and Dan went on to become notable cartoonists. She also joined the Labor Party around this time.

On 24 July 1926 she married her second husband, stonemason Sydney Temple Green. That year she also became a member of the Labor Party's central executive, having risen through the South Sydney and Bankstown organising committees and the East Sydney branch. On 24 November 1931 she became the first woman to serve in the New South Wales Legislative Council when she was appointed by Premier Jack Lang (she was joined two days later by Ellen Webster). She served until 7 September 1932.

A Roman Catholic, Green died in 1965 and was buried at Rookwood Cemetery.
