= Electoral district of Surry Hills =

Former state electoral district of New South Wales, Australia

Surry Hills was an electoral district of the Legislative Assembly in the Australian state of New South Wales, named after and including Surry Hills and was originally created in the 1904 re-distribution of electorates following the 1903 New South Wales referendum, which required the number of members of the Legislative Assembly to be reduced from 125 to 90. It consisted of part of the abolished seat of Sydney-Flinders and parts of Sydney-Cook and Randwick. In 1920, with the introduction of proportional representation, it was absorbed into Sydney. It was recreated in 1927 and abolished in 1930.

== Members for Surry Hills ==
First incarnation (1904–1920)
Member	Party	Term
John Norton	Independent	1904–1906
Albert Bruntnell	Liberal Reform	1906–1907
Sir James Graham	Liberal Reform	1907–1910
Henry Hoyle	Labor	1910–1917
Henry Hoyle	Nationalist	1917–1917
Arthur Buckley	Labor	1917–1920
Second incarnation (1927–1930)
Member	Party	Term
Tom Shannon	Labor	1927–1930

== Election results ==
1927 New South Wales state election: Surry Hills
Party	Candidate	Votes	%	±%
Labor	Tom Shannon	7,536	66.1	
Nationalist	William Adkins	3,694	32.4	
Independent	John Salmon	175	1.5	
Total formal votes		11,405	98.6	
Informal votes		164	1.4	
Turnout		11,569	76.7	
Labor win		(new seat)		
