= William Holdsworth (politician) =

Australian politician

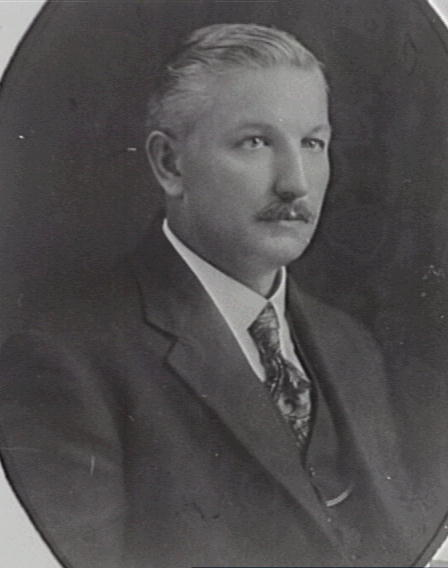
William Holdsworth (circa 1922–1924)

William Holdsworth (10 February 1875 – 18 March 1937) was an English-born Australian politician.

He was born in Yorkshire to draper John William Holdsworth and Emma, née Hollingworth. He arrived in Australia in 1893 and worked as a glassblower in Victoria before moving to Sydney in 1900, where he worked for the Australian Drug Company. On 21 May 1902, he married Mena Cantwell, with whom he had four children. He was the licensee of the Royal Pacific Hotel in Pyrmont and the Cowper Wharf Hotel in Woolloomooloo from 1920 to 1924, and of the Tilbury Hotel in Union Street from 1924. He served on Sydney City Council from 1918 to 1927. In 1925, he was elected to the New South Wales Legislative Assembly as a Labor member for Sydney. When proportional representation was abolished in 1927 he was not able to win Labor preselection for a single-member seat and retired. Holdsworth died in 1937 in Sydney.

New South Wales Legislative Assembly
Preceded by Greg McGirr; Patrick Minahan	Member for Sydney; 1925–1927; Served alongside: Birt/Minahan, Burke, Jackson, Levy	Seat abolished
