= Electoral district of Belmore =

Former state electoral district of New South Wales, Australia

Belmore was an electoral district of the Legislative Assembly in the Australian state of New South Wales, created in 1904 in inner Sydney from Sydney-Belmore and parts of the abolished seats of Sydney-Cook and Sydney-Phillip. It was named after Governor Belmore. It was originally in northern Surry Hills bounded by George Street and the Darling Harbour railway line in the west, Cleveland Street in the south, Liverpool Street, Oxford Street in the north and Riley Street, Wilton Street and Waterloo streets in the east. In 1913 it absorbed part of the abolished seat of Pyrmont. In 1920, with the introduction of proportional representation, it was absorbed into the multi-member electorate of Sydney.

== Members for Belmore ==
Member	Party	Term
Edward O'Sullivan	Progressive	1904–1909
Edward O'Sullivan	Labour	1909–1910
Patrick Minahan	Labor	1910–1917
Michael Burke	Labor	1917–1920

== Election results ==
1917 New South Wales state election: Belmore
Party	Candidate	Votes	%	±%
Labor	Michael Burke	3,224	66.9	+16.0
Independent Labor	Thomas Barlow	1,596	33.1	+33.1
Total formal votes		4,820	98.5	+1.9
Informal votes		71	1.5	−1.9
Turnout		4,891	48.1	−11.7
Labor hold		Swing	+16.0	

The sitting Labor member for Belmore, Patrick Minahan, lost preselection and unsuccessfully contested Cootamundra against Labor turned Nationalist Premier William Holman.
