= Patrick Minahan =

Australian politician

Patrick Joseph Minahan (27 March 1866 – 3 October 1933) was an Irish-born Australian politician.

He was born at Killaloe, County Clare to bootmaker Patrick Minahan and Mary, née Murphy. He arrived in New South Wales around 1883 and by 1888 had established a boot manufacturing business. In 1900, he married Catherine Kinsela, with whom he had five children; she died in 1914. In 1915, he remarried with Elizabeth Mary Ward in Dublin, and returned to Sydney. The couple had a further two children. He became involved in the Labor Party and was a member of the central executive from 1907 to 1913, serving as vice-president in 1909 and president in 1910.

He was elected to the New South Wales Legislative Assembly as the member for Belmore at the 1910 by-election. Labor split in 1917 over the conscription issue, with Premier William Holman leading many members into the new Nationalist Party, a merger of the pro-conscriptionist Labor members and the Liberal Party. Minahan stayed with the Labor party but he lost preselection for Belmore. Instead he unsuccessfully stood against Holman for Cootamundra.

Proportional representation was introduced in NSW for the 1920 election and Minahan was nominated by the Labor Party for the five member seat of Sydney. Shortly before polling day however, he and Scott Campbell had their endorsement withdrawn because they signed a pledge for the unconditional release of twelve imprisoned members of the Industrial Workers of the World. Minahan was elected third, and sat as an independent until October 1920 when he was re-admitted to the caucus. He was re-elected fifth at the 1922 election,

Defeated in 1925, he returned some months later after to fill the vacancy caused by John Birt's death. He quit the Labour Party in 1927, stating that this was because "the Communists have captured the Labor Movement in our State". Minahan stood against Premier Jack Lang as an Independent Labor candidate for Auburn, but was defeated.

Minahan was appointed a Knight of St. Sylvester by the Pope in 1920. He died at Lewisham on 3 October 1933 (aged 67).

== See also ==
- Members of the New South Wales Legislative Assembly
- 1910–1913
- 1913–1917
- 1920–1922
- 1922–1925
- 1925–1927
- Results of New South Wales elections
- 1910 by-election (Belmore)
- 1910 (Belmore)
- 1913 (Belmore)
- 1917 (Cootamundra)
- 1920 (Sydney)
- 1922 (Sydney)
- 1925 (Sydney)
- 1927 (Auburn)

New South Wales Legislative Assembly
Preceded by Edward O'Sullivan	Member for Belmore; 1910–1917	Succeeded by Michael Burke
Preceded by New seat	Member for Sydney; 1920–1925; Served alongside: Birt, Buckley/Jackson, Burke/McGirr, Levy	Succeeded by Michael Burke; William Holdsworth
Preceded by John Birt	Member for Sydney; 1925–1927; Served alongside: Burke, Holdsworth, Jackson, Levy	Succeeded by Seat abolished
