= Electoral district of Sydney =

New South Wales state electoral division

Sydney New South Wales—Legislative Assembly
- Interactive map of district boundaries from the 2023 state election
- State: New South Wales
- Dates current: 1920–1927; 2007–present
- MP: Alex Greenwich
- Party: Independent
- Namesake: Sydney
- Electors: 55,131 (2019)
- Area: 15.9 km^{2} (6.1 sq mi)
- Demographic: Inner-metropolitan
Electorates around Sydney:
Lane Cove	North Shore	North Shore
Balmain	Sydney	Vaucluse
Newtown	Heffron	Coogee

Sydney is an electoral district of the Legislative Assembly of the Australian state of New South Wales in Inner Sydney.

Independent Alex Greenwich has represented the seat since the 2012 Sydney by-election, triggered by the resignation of previous independent Clover Moore, who was the Lord Mayor of Sydney, due to introduced state laws preventing dual membership of state parliament and local council.

== Geography ==
Sydney includes the Sydney CBD. On its current boundaries, Sydney takes in the suburbs and localities of Barangaroo, Broadway, Chinatown, Darling Harbour, Darlinghurst, Dawes Point, Elizabeth Bay, Haymarket, Millers Point, Paddington, Potts Point, Pyrmont, The Rocks, Woolloomooloo, Wynyard, Surry Hills, Rushcutters Bay; and parts of Ultimo.

== History ==
In the first Parliament of the New South Wales colony, 1856–57, there was a four-member electoral district called Sydney City with voters casting four votes, and the four leading candidates being elected. In 1859, it was replaced by the four-member districts of East Sydney and West Sydney. In 1894, the three four-member districts of East Sydney, West Sydney and South Sydney (created in 1880) were replaced by eleven single-member districts with "Sydney" in their title: Sydney-Belmore, Sydney-Bligh, Sydney-Cook, Sydney-Denison, Sydney-Fitzroy, Sydney-Flinders, Sydney-Gipps, Sydney-King, Sydney-Lang, Sydney-Phillip and Sydney-Pyrmont. From 1904, these electorates were renamed or abolished.

In 1920, the inner-city electoral districts of Belmore, Darlinghurst, King, Paddington, Phillip and Surry Hills were combined to create a new incarnation of Sydney, which elected five members by proportional representation. This was replaced by the single member electorates of King, Paddington, Phillip and Surry Hills for the 1927 election. Central Sydney subsequently fell within a number of successive electorates, including Elizabeth and Port Jackson.

Sydney was recreated for the 2007 election, replacing abolished district Bligh and also taking in the Sydney CBD and Pyrmont that were previously in Port Jackson (the remainder of Port Jackson became the Electoral district of Balmain).

From 1920 to 1927 the district included Lord Howe Island, which was transferred from and to the electorate of King. As part of the redistribution of electoral districts for the 2023 state election, a proposal was received to move Lord Howe Island back into the electorate of Sydney. However, the NSW Electoral Commission eventually decided to retain the island within the electorate of Port Macquarie, which has included the island since 1991.

== Members for Sydney ==
First incarnation (1920–1927, 5 members)
Member	Party	Term	Member	Party	Term	Member	Party	Term	Member	Party	Term	Member	Party	Term
Daniel Levy	Nationalist	1920–1927	Arthur Buckley	Labor	1920–1922	John Birt	Labor	1920–1925	Michael Burke	Labor	1920–1922	Patrick Minahan	Labor	1920–1925
Daniel Levy	Nationalist	1920–1927	Joseph Jackson	Nationalist	1922–1927	John Birt	Labor	1920–1925	Greg McGirr	Labor	1922–1925	Patrick Minahan	Labor	1920–1925
Daniel Levy	Nationalist	1920–1927	Joseph Jackson	Nationalist	1922–1927	John Birt	Labor	1920–1925	Greg McGirr	Young Australia	1925–1925	Patrick Minahan	Labor	1920–1925
Daniel Levy	Nationalist	1920–1927	Joseph Jackson	Nationalist	1922–1927	John Birt	Labor	1920–1925	Michael Burke	Labor	1925–1927	William Holdsworth	Labor	1925–1927
Daniel Levy	Nationalist	1920–1927	Joseph Jackson	Nationalist	1922–1927	Patrick Minahan	Labor	1925–1927	Michael Burke	Labor	1925–1927	William Holdsworth	Labor	1925–1927

Second incarnation (2007–present, 1 member)
Member	Party	Term
Clover Moore	Independent	2007–2012
Alex Greenwich	Independent	2012–present

== Election results ==
2023 New South Wales state election: Sydney
Party	Candidate	Votes	%	±%
Independent	Alex Greenwich	20,025	41.1	+4.4
Liberal	Phyllisse Stanton	11,219	23.0	−5.4
Labor	Skye Tito	10,575	21.7	+5.5
Greens	Nick Ward	5,949	12.2	−0.5
Sustainable Australia	Mark Whitton	972	2.0	+0.3
Total formal votes		48,740	98.2	+0.1
Informal votes		900	1.8	−0.1
Turnout		49,640	79.4	−0.3
Notional two-party-preferred count
Labor	Skye Tito	22,054	61.3	+11.2
Liberal	Phyllisse Stanton	13,936	38.7	−11.2
Two-candidate-preferred result
Independent	Alex Greenwich	26,600	65.6	−10.4
Labor	Skye Tito	13,921	34.4	+10.4
Independent hold		Swing	−10.4	
