= Daniel Levy (politician) =

Australian politician (1872–1937)

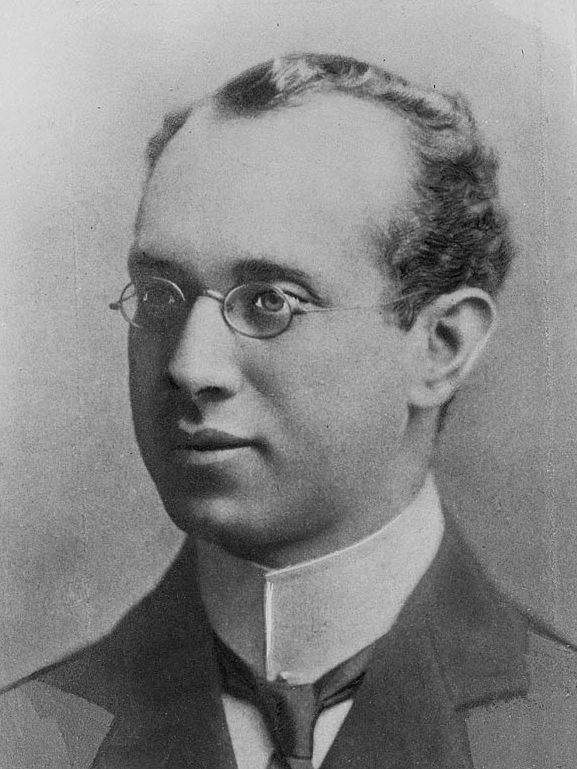
Daniel Levy, MLA (1872-1937) c. 1918

Sir Daniel Levy (30 November 1872 – 20 May 1937) was an Australian politician.

== Early life ==
He was born in London to tailor Joseph Levy and Esther, née Cohen. He arrived in Sydney in 1880 and attended Crown Street Superior School, Sydney Grammar School and the University of Sydney, graduating with a first in Bachelor of Arts (Honours) in 1893 and a Bachelor of Laws in 1895, in which year he was called to the Bar. In 1902, he was admitted as a solicitor. Levy was active in Jewish affairs and was co-editor of the Australasian Hebrew newspaper in 1896 with Percy J. Marks.

== Political career ==
He entered the New South Wales Legislative Assembly in 1901 as the Liberal member for Sydney-Fitzroy, transferring to Darlinghurst in 1904. He would represent Sydney for the period of proportional representation from 1920 to 1927, Paddington from 1927 to 1930, and Woollahra thereafter.

In 1919, he was elected Speaker of the Legislative Assembly. The Labor Party had a narrow victory at the 1920 election, winning 43 of the 90 seats. Levy, despite being a member of the Nationalist opposition, accepted re-election as speaker, making it easier for Labor to obtain a majority, provoking discontent within his own party, with John Fitzpatrick making a scathing speech, lasting almost 2 hours, including calling Levy a rat and a traitor and that if he was knighted he would "arise Sir Judas Iscariot". Levy resigned as speaker on 12 December 1921 after the Nationalist leader George Fuller announced that he had a likely majority, his resignation precipitating the defeat of the Dooley government on the floor of the house. Levy was re-elected as speaker following the formation of the Fuller ministry, which lasted seven hours, and continued the position when Dooley resumed the premiership later the same day.

Levy was known as a scrupulously independent Speaker, advocating the British model of speakership in which the speaker's seat was uncontested, and made efforts to have this practice adopted by statute. He was speaker until 1925, served again from 1927 to 1930, and served briefly in Bertram Stevens' 1932 emergency cabinet as Minister for Justice and Attorney General. Resuming the speakership in 1932, he held the position until his death on 20 May 1937 (aged 64) at Darling Point.

Levy was knighted in 1929 for his service as Speaker.

New South Wales Legislative Assembly
Preceded by Henry Chapman	Member for Sydney-Fitzroy; 1901–1904	District abolished
New district	Member for Darlinghurst; 1904–1920	District abolished
New district	Member for Sydney; 1920–1927; With: Birt, Minahan; Buckley, Jackson; Burke, McGirr, Burke; Minahan, Holdsworth	District abolished
New district	Member for Paddington; 1927–1930	Succeeded by Maurice O'Sullivan
Preceded by Maurice O'Sullivan	Member for Woollahra; 1930–1937	Succeeded by Harold Mason
Preceded by John Cohen	Speaker of the New South Wales Legislative Assembly; 1919–1921	Succeeded by Simon Hickey
Preceded by Simon Hickey	Speaker of the New South Wales Legislative Assembly; 1921–1925	Succeeded by James Dooley
Preceded by James Dooley	Speaker of the New South Wales Legislative Assembly; 1927–1930	Succeeded by Frank Burke
Preceded by Frank Burke	Speaker of the New South Wales Legislative Assembly; 1932–1937	Succeeded by Reginald Weaver
Political offices
Preceded by Joe Lamaro	Attorney General of New South Wales; 1932	Succeeded by Henry Manning
Preceded by William McKell	Minister for Justice; 1932	Succeeded by Lewis Martin
