= William Maule McDowell Webster =

William Webster
- Born: William Maule McDowell Webster; 3 January 1885; Forbes, New South Wales
- Died: 20 April 1958 (aged 73)
- Occupations: Trade unionist; Stock and station agent
- Office: President of the New South Wales branch
- Term: 1927 – 1928
- Political party: Australian Labor Party
- Spouse: Ellen Webster
- Parent(s): Edward Webster; Ellen Webster, née Crooks

William Maule McDowell Webster (3 January 1885 – 20 April 1958) was an Australian unionist and station agent.

Born in Forbes to grazier Edward Webster and Ellen, née Crooks, he became a stock and station agent. On 26 July 1921 he married Ellen Callachor, who would later be one of the first women to sit in the New South Wales Parliament. In 1927 he was elected president of the New South Wales branch of the Australian Labor Party, serving until 1928. He and his wife were both supporters of controversial New South Wales Premier Jack Lang. He ran several times for state and federal elections without success. From 1946 to 1952 he was the Australian representative on the British Phosphate Commission. He died in 1958.
