= Greg McGirr =

Australian politician

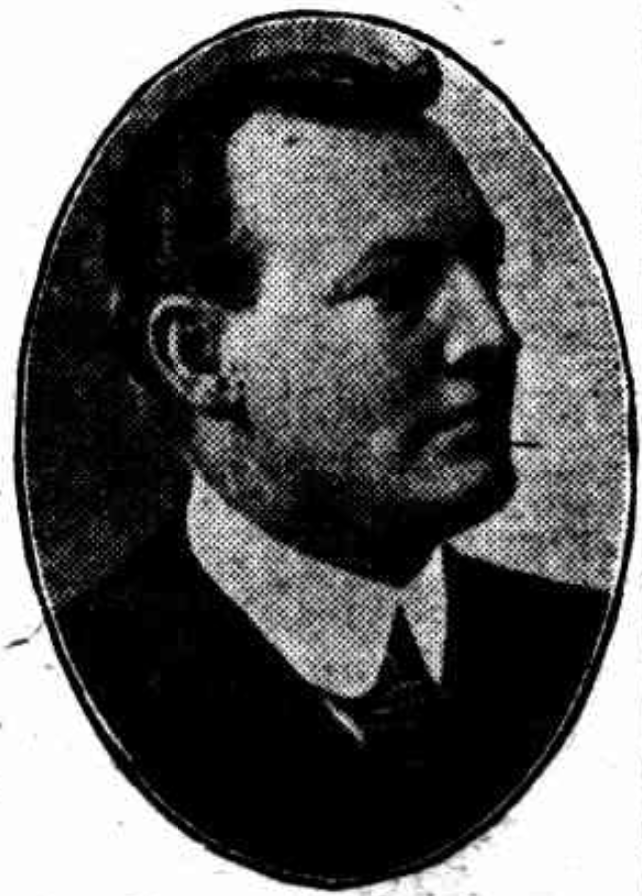

Leader of the Opposition of New South Wales
- In office 9 March 1923 – 16 April 1923
- Premier: George Fuller
- Deputy: Bill Dunn
- Preceded by: James Dooley
- Succeeded by: Bill Dunn

Personal details
- Born: John Joseph Gregory McGirr; 11 October 1879 Parkes, New South Wales, Australia
- Died: 23 March 1949 (aged 69) Sydney, Australia
- Party: State Labor (1940)
- Other political affiliations: Labor (until 1923); Young Australia (1923–1925)
- Spouse: Rachel Miller (m. 1914)
- Relations: James McGirr (brother); Patrick McGirr (brother); Trixie Gardner (daughter); Joe McGirr (grandson)
- Education: University of Sydney
- Occupation: Pharmacist

John Joseph Gregory McGirr (11 October 1879 – 23 March 1949) was an Australian politician who served in the New South Wales Legislative Assembly from 1913 to 1925, representing the Labor Party. He served as the party's leader (and Leader of the Opposition) for little over a month in 1923, during an internal dispute. He had earlier served as deputy leader and as Minister for Public Health under James Dooley.

== Early life ==
The second son of John Patrick McGirr, a farmer, and Mary (née O'Sullivan) McGirr, both Irish emigrants, Greg McGirr was born in Parkes, New South Wales, and educated at St Joseph's Convent, Parkes, and St Stanislaus' College, Bathurst. He graduated in pharmacy from the University of Sydney in 1904. James McGirr, Premier of that state from 1947 to 1952, was one of his younger brothers. Another brother, Patrick, was also a New South Wales politician.

McGirr opened chemist shops at Parkes, Peak Hill, Orange, Narromine, and eventually Sydney. He was heavily involved in land and stock trading.

== Politics ==
McGirr joined the Labor Party and in 1910 ran unsuccessfully for the seat of Orange. He won Yass at a by-election in 1913. In 1914 he married Rachel Rittenburg Miller (OBE), a schoolteacher. The couple had nine children.

He was ALP whip from 1916 until 1917. At the 1920 election proportional representation was introduced and the Yass electorate was absorbed into an expanded multi-member electoral district of Cootamundra, and he won a seat, helping to defeat the former Labor leader, turned Nationalist William Holman. Labor won the election he became Minister for Public Health and Motherhood until the defeat of the Government in the 1922 election.

He was named deputy party leader after the death of John Storey in 1921. McGirr was supported by Jack Bailey, an influential member of the Australian Workers Union that dominated the State Executive of the Labor Party, who helped McGirr win Labor pre-selection for Sydney. McGirr won a seat at the 1922 election, at the expense of Michael Burke, who was popular within the Labor Party. James Dooley, the former premier and leader of the Labor Party accused the State Executive of corruption and the State Executive responded by expelling Dooley from the party in March 1923 and appointing McGirr as the new leader. His leadership was brief however as in April 1923 the Federal Executive intervened in the NSW branch and Bill Dunn was appointed interim leader, pending a caucus vote. At the 1923 conference, Dooley was re-admitted to the party, and the State Executive was replaced. Jack Lang became party leader in July 1923. Bailey was accused of being involved with a ballot box scandal that would end in his expulsion from the Labor Party.

Without the support of Bailey and the AWU on the State Executive, McGirr was isolated and resigned from the party in July 1923 and established the "Young Australia Party". He was defeated at the 1925 election and subsequently concentrated on his business interests, except for an unsuccessful attempt to win Calare for the State (Hughes-Evans) Labor Party in September 1940.

== Death ==
He died in Sydney, aged 69, survived by his wife and eight of their nine children. He was a Catholic. One of his daughters, Trixie, moved to Britain where she became a Conservative politician and is the only Australian woman to date to have been made a life peer as the Baroness Gardner of Parkes. His grandson, Joe McGirr, was elected to the Parliament of New South Wales in 2018, as an independent.

== See also ==
- Political families of Australia

== Notes ==
New South Wales Legislative Assembly
Preceded by Niels Rasmus Nielsen	Member for Yass; 1913–1920	District absorbed by Cootamundra
Preceded by William Holman	Member for Cootamundra; 1920–1922; With: Peter Loughlin; Hugh Main	Succeeded by James McGirr; Peter Loughlin; Hugh Main
Preceded by Michael Burke; Patrick Minahan; John Birt; Arthur Buckley; Daniel Levy	Member for Sydney; 1922–1925; With: Patrick Minahan; John Birt; Joseph Jackson; Daniel Levy	Succeeded by Michael Burke; William Holdsworth; John Birt; Joseph Jackson; Daniel Levy
Party political offices
Preceded by James Dooley	Leader of the Australian Labor Party in New South Wales; 1923	Succeeded by Bill Dunn
