= Arthur Buckley =

Australian politician

Arthur William Buckley (16 January 1891 – 10 June 1974) was an Australian politician.

He was born in Charters Towers in Queensland to miner William James Buckley and Louisa, née Carlson. He attended primary school before being apprenticed to an electrician; he subsequently worked as a boilermaker's assistant and in the sugar industry. In 1912 he moved to Sydney to work as a tram conductor. A member of the Industrial Workers of the World, he was elected to the New South Wales Legislative Assembly in 1917 as the Labor member for Surry Hills. Arrested during the 1917 general strike, he was president of the Amalgamated Railway and Tramway Service Association branch of the Australian Railways Union from around 1918 to 1922. Elected as one of the members for the seat of Sydney with the introduction of proportional representation in 1920, he retired in 1922 and the following year became secretary of the union. He was suspended by federal executives in 1924. He then studied law, becoming a law clerk and property investor. Buckley died in 1974 at Arncliffe.

New South Wales Legislative Assembly
Preceded by Henry Hoyle	Member for Surry Hills; 1917–1920	Abolished
New seat	Member for Sydney; 1920–1922; Served alongside: Birt, Burke, Levy, Minahan	Succeeded by Joseph Jackson; Greg McGirr
