= Joseph Jackson (Australian politician) =

Australian politician

The Honourable Joseph Jackson
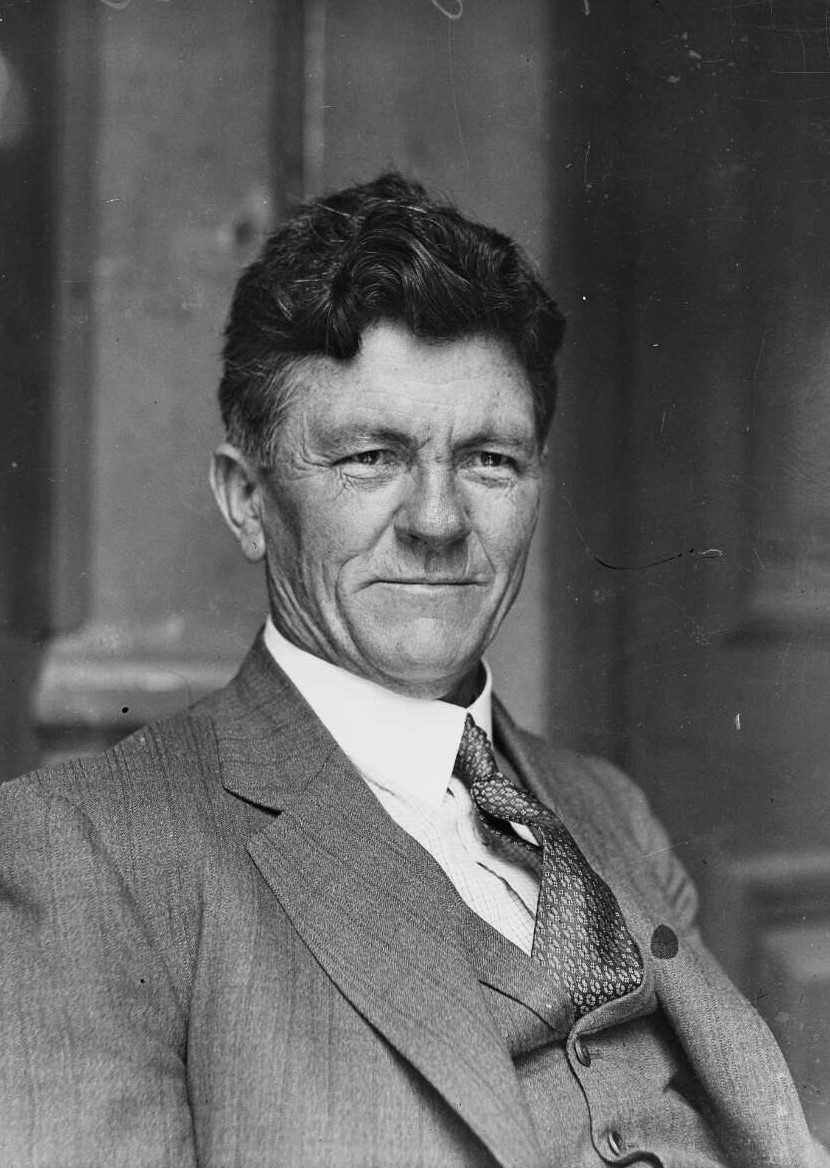

Minister for Local Government
- In office 18 June 1932 – 14 February 1933
- Preceded by: Michael Bruxner
- Succeeded by: Eric Spooner

Personal details
- Born: 26 November 1874 Wellington, New South Wales
- Died: 23 August 1961 (aged 86) Sydney
- Party: Nationalist Party of Australia, United Australia Party, Independent, Liberal Party

Joseph Jackson OBE (26 November 1874 – 23 August 1961) was an Australian politician and a member of the New South Wales Legislative Assembly from 1922 until 1956. He was variously a Nationalist, United Australia Party, Independent and Liberal member of parliament .

== Early life and career ==
Jackson was born in Wellington, New South Wales and educated to elementary level in rural state schools. His father was an alluvial gold prospector and Jackson worked in rural occupations until he founded a substantial retail business at the Peak Hill gold rush after 1889. He moved to Sydney in 1904 and established a chain of retail stores. Jackson purchased Faulconbridge, the home of Sir Henry Parkes and donated a large tract of land (Jackson Park) to form a Prime Ministers' Corridor of Oaks. Jackson was a noted collector of Australiana. He was awarded an OBE in 1957. Jackson was an alderman on Sydney City Council in 1918 – 1922, 1924–1927 and 1930–1935. He was the Lord Mayor of Sydney in 1931 representing the Civic Reform Association.

== State parliament ==
After an unsuccessful attempt in 1920, he was elected to the New South Wales Parliament as a Nationalist party member for the multi-member seat of Sydney at the 1922 state election. He retained the seat at the next two elections and successfully contested the seat of Nepean when the NSW electoral system reverted to single member seats at the 1927 election. He retained Nepean as a Nationalist (1927–1932) and United Australia (1931–1944)member. He described himself as a "Liberal Nationalist" at the 1944 election. He was a foundation member of the Liberal Party in 1945.

== Government ==
Jackson was the Minister for Local Government in the Stevens government for a short period in 1932–3. He retired from the parliament at the 1956 election

New South Wales Legislative Assembly
Preceded by Arthur Buckley	Member for Sydney; 1922–1927; Served alongside: Birt/Minahan, Levy, Minahan/Holdsworth, McGirr/Burke	Succeeded by Seat abolished
Preceded by Restored seat	Member for Nepean; 1927–1956	Succeeded by Bill Chapman
Political offices
Preceded by Michael Bruxner	Minister for Local Government; 1932 – 1933	Succeeded by Eric Spooner
Preceded by Ernest Marks	Lord Mayor of Sydney; 1931	Succeeded by Samuel Walder
