= John Birt (politician) =

Australian politician

John Edward Birt (11 December 1873 – 21 June 1925) was an Australian politician.

He was born at Woolloomooloo in Sydney to seaman John and Margaret (née McDonough) Birt, and educated by the Marist Brothers in Darlinghurst before working in a grocery and then in retail stores. From 1904 he worked as a commercial traveller and later as a public service clerk, becoming involved with the Public Service Association. He was president of the Paddington Labour League, founded the Darlinghurst branch, and was a member of the executive from 1908 to 1910.

In 1919 he was elected to the New South Wales Legislative Assembly as the Labor member for Paddington. With the introduction of proportional representation in 1920 he became one of the members for Sydney, and served until his death at Darlinghurst in 1925.

New South Wales Legislative Assembly
Preceded by Lawrence O'Hara	Member for Paddington; 1919–1920	Succeeded by Seat abolished
Preceded by New seat	Member for Sydney; 1920–1925; Served alongside: Buckley/Jackson, Burke/McGirr/Burke, Levy, Minahan/Holdsworth	Succeeded by Patrick Minahan
