= Michael Burke (Australian politician) =

Australian politician

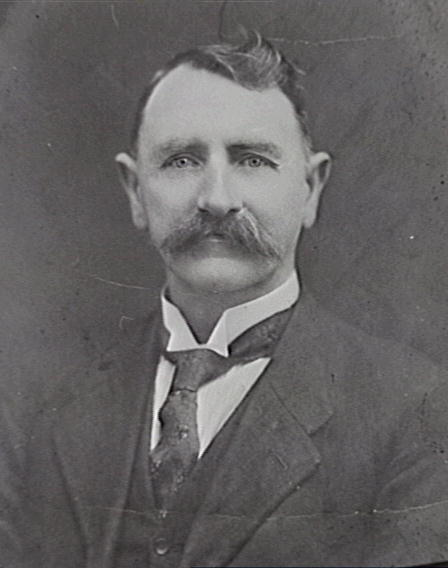
Portrait of Alderman Michael Burke, Municipal Council of the City of Sydney, 1916, Unique ID A-00041191

Michael Burke (1865 – 5 July 1937) was an Irish-born Australian politician.

He was born at Tipperary, Ireland, to farmer Thomas Burke and Annie, née Quirke. He arrived in New South Wales in 1887 and worked as a labourer and union organiser. Around 1900, he married Lucy Agnes Lloyd, with whom he had six children. He was active in local politics, serving on Sydney City Council from 1909 to 1912 and from 1913 to 1927. He had been a foundation member of the Labor Party and served on its central executive from 1904 to 1913 and from 1915 to 1917.

In 1917, he was elected to the New South Wales Legislative Assembly as the member for Belmore. With the introduction of proportional representation in 1920 he was elected as one of the members for Sydney; he was defeated in 1922 but returned in 1925. After single-member districts were re-introduced in 1927 he was elected as the member for Phillip, but he retired in 1930. Burke died at Summer Hill in 1937.

New South Wales Legislative Assembly
Preceded by Patrick Minahan	Member for Belmore; 1917–1920	Seat abolished
New seat	Member for Sydney; 1920–1922; Served alongside: Birt, Buckley, Levy, Minahan	Succeeded by Joseph Jackson; Greg McGirr
Preceded by Greg McGirr; Patrick Minahan	Member for Sydney; 1925–1927; Served alongside: Birt/Minahan, Holdsworth, Jackson, Levy	Seat abolished
New seat	Member for Phillip; 1927–1930	Succeeded by Tom Shannon
