= Results of the 1950 New South Wales state election =

State election for New South Wales, Australia in June 1950

New South Wales state election, 17 June 1950 Legislative Assembly << 1947–1953 >>
| Enrolled voters | 1,919,479 (Note: There were 1,768,801 enrolled voters in 86 contested electorates and 150,878 were enrolled in 8 uncontested electorates (5 Country, 2 Liberal and 1 Labor).) | | | | |
| Votes cast | 1,611,349 | | Turnout | 92.75 | −1,86 |
| Informal votes | 28,964 | | Informal | 1.77 | −0.22 |
Summary of votes by party
| Party | Primary votes | % | Swing | Seats | Change |
| Labor | 753,268 | 46.75 | +0.8 | 46 | −6 |
| Liberal | 604,428 | 37.51 | +5.8 | 29 | +10 |
| Country | 144,573 | 8.97 | −1.3 | 17 | +2 |
| Independent | 37,229 | 2.31 | −3.6 | 0 | −2 |
| Independent Labor | 26,596 | 1.65 | +0.8 | 2 | +2 |
| Lang Labor | 19,683 | 1.22 | −2.8 | 0 | −2 |
| Communist | 13,589 | 0.84 | −0.9 | 0 | 0 |
| Independent Country | 6,445 | 0.40 | +0.40 | 0 | 0 |
| Independent Liberal | 5,538 | 0.34 | −0.2 | 0 | 0 |
| Total | 1,611,349 | | | 94 | |

This is a list of electoral district results for the 1950 New South Wales state election.

== Results by electoral district ==
=== Albury ===
1950 New South Wales state election: Albury
| Party | Candidate | Votes | % | ±% |
|---|---|---|---|---|
| Liberal | Doug Padman | 9,894 | 55.3 | |
| Labor | John Hurley | 7,996 | 44.7 | |
| Total formal votes | | 17,890 | 99.4 | |
| Informal votes | | 111 | 0.6 | |
| Turnout | | 18,001 | 93.5 | |
| Liberal hold | | Swing | | |

=== Armidale ===
1950 New South Wales state election: Armidale
| Party | Candidate | Votes | % | ±% |
|---|---|---|---|---|
| Country | Davis Hughes | 7,656 | 49.8 | |
| Labor | Jim Cahill | 7,246 | 47.2 | |
| Independent | Edward Spensley | 458 | 3.0 | |
| Total formal votes | | 15,360 | 98.8 | |
| Informal votes | | 181 | 1.2 | |
| Turnout | | 15,541 | 93.1 | |
Two-party-preferred result
| Country | Davis Hughes | 7,922 | 51.6 | |
| Labor | Jim Cahill | 7,438 | 48.4 | |
| Country hold | | Swing | | |

=== Ashfield ===
1950 New South Wales state election: Ashfield
| Party | Candidate | Votes | % | ±% |
|---|---|---|---|---|
| Liberal | Athol Richardson | 13,296 | 58.2 | |
| Labor | Ernest Grove | 9,559 | 41.8 | |
| Total formal votes | | 22,855 | 98.8 | |
| Informal votes | | 285 | 1.2 | |
| Turnout | | 23,140 | 93.3 | |
| Liberal hold | | Swing | | |

=== Auburn ===
1950 New South Wales state election: Auburn
| Party | Candidate | Votes | % | ±% |
|---|---|---|---|---|
| Labor | Edgar Dring | 10,151 | 42.3 | |
| Lang Labor | Chris Lang | 5,815 | 24.2 | |
| Liberal | James Dennison | 5,683 | 23.7 | |
| Independent | Alexander Kerr | 1,808 | 7.5 | |
| Communist | Roy Kirby | 536 | 2.2 | |
| Total formal votes | | 23,993 | 96.2 | |
| Informal votes | | 953 | 3.8 | |
| Turnout | | 24,946 | 93.4 | |
Two-candidate-preferred result
| Labor | Edgar Dring | 13,556 | 56.5 | |
| Lang Labor | Chris Lang | 10,437 | 43.5 | |
| Labor gain from Lang Labor | | Swing | | |

=== Balmain ===
1950 New South Wales state election: Balmain
| Party | Candidate | Votes | % | ±% |
|---|---|---|---|---|
| Labor | John McMahon | 11,568 | 59.1 | |
| Liberal | Frederick Mann | 4,068 | 20.8 | |
| Independent Labor | Mary Quirk | 2,434 | 12.4 | |
| Communist | Thomas Dowling | 1,063 | 5.4 | |
| Independent | Malinda Ivey | 457 | 2.3 | |
| Total formal votes | | 19,590 | 97.5 | |
| Informal votes | | 499 | 2.5 | |
| Turnout | | 20,089 | 93.8 | |
Two-party-preferred result
| Labor | John McMahon | | 73.0 (Note: Two party preferred vote was estimated.) | |
| Liberal | Frederick Mann | | 27.0 | |
| Labor hold | | Swing | | |

Mary Quirk was the sitting Labor member, however she was defeated for pre-selection by John McMahon.

=== Bankstown ===
1950 New South Wales state election: Bankstown
| Party | Candidate | Votes | % | ±% |
|---|---|---|---|---|
| Labor | Spence Powell | 15,616 | 62.8 | |
| Liberal | Blanche Barkl | 9,242 | 37.2 | |
| Total formal votes | | 24,858 | 98.4 | |
| Informal votes | | 407 | 1.6 | |
| Turnout | | 25,265 | 93.4 | |
| Labor hold | | Swing | | |

=== Barwon ===
1950 New South Wales state election: Barwon
| Party | Candidate | Votes | % | ±% |
|---|---|---|---|---|
| Country | Geoff Crawford | 6,113 | 45.1 | |
| Labor | Norman Ferguson | 4,863 | 35.9 | |
| Independent Labor | Roy Heferen | 1,593 | 11.8 | |
| Liberal | William McKechnie | 988 | 7.3 | |
| Total formal votes | | 13,557 | 97.9 | |
| Informal votes | | 290 | 2.1 | |
| Turnout | | 13,847 | 85.7 | |
Two-party-preferred result
| Country | Geoff Crawford | | 53.60 | |
| Labor | Norman Ferguson | | 46.4 | |
| Country gain from Labor | | Swing | | |

The sitting member was Roy Heferen who had been elected as a Labor candidate, however he was disendorsed as a result of voting in the election for the Legislative Council and stood as an Independent labor candidate.

=== Bathurst ===
1950 New South Wales state election: Bathurst
| Party | Candidate | Votes | % | ±% |
|---|---|---|---|---|
| Labor | Gus Kelly | 9,348 | 58.5 | |
| Liberal | Basil Genders | 4,185 | 26.2 | |
| Country | Allan Harding | 2,459 | 15.4 | |
| Total formal votes | | 15,992 | 99.0 | |
| Informal votes | | 167 | 1.0 | |
| Turnout | | 16,159 | 94.8 | |
Two-party-preferred result
| Labor | Gus Kelly | | 60.0 | |
| Liberal | Basil Genders | | 40.0 | |
| Labor hold | | Swing | | |

=== Blacktown ===
1950 New South Wales state election: Blacktown
| Party | Candidate | Votes | % | ±% |
|---|---|---|---|---|
| Labor | John Freeman | 13,229 | 55.5 | |
| Liberal | Nancy Saxby | 10,616 | 44.5 | |
| Total formal votes | | 23,845 | 98.8 | |
| Informal votes | | 283 | 1.2 | |
| Turnout | | 24,128 | 93.2 | |
| Labor hold | | Swing | | |

=== Bondi ===
1950 New South Wales state election: Bondi
| Party | Candidate | Votes | % | ±% |
|---|---|---|---|---|
| Labor | Abe Landa | 12,179 | 52.0 | |
| Liberal | Keith Weekes | 11,255 | 48.0 | |
| Total formal votes | | 23,434 | 98.7 | |
| Informal votes | | 314 | 1.3 | |
| Turnout | | 23,748 | 92.4 | |
| Labor hold | | Swing | | |

=== Bulli ===
1950 New South Wales state election: Bulli
| Party | Candidate | Votes | % | ±% |
|---|---|---|---|---|
| Labor | Laurie Kelly | 9,963 | 62.0 | |
| Liberal | Leslie Strachan | 4,688 | 29.2 | |
| Communist | John Martin | 1,422 | 8.8 | |
| Total formal votes | | 16,073 | 98.5 | |
| Informal votes | | 249 | 1.5 | |
| Turnout | | 16,322 | 94.3 | |
Two-party-preferred result
| Labor | Laurie Kelly | | 69.0 | |
| Liberal | Leslie Strachan | | 31.0 | |
| Labor hold | | Swing | | |

=== Burrinjuck ===
1950 New South Wales state election: Burrinjuck
| Party | Candidate | Votes | % | ±% |
|---|---|---|---|---|
| Labor | Bill Sheahan | 10,159 | 57.2 | |
| Country | William Ross | 7,615 | 42.8 | |
| Total formal votes | | 17,774 | 99.3 | |
| Informal votes | | 123 | 0.7 | |
| Turnout | | 17,897 | 94.8 | |
| Labor notional hold | | | | |

Burrinjuck was a new seat, largely replacing Yass. Bill Sheahan (Labor) was the member for Yass.

=== Burwood ===
1950 New South Wales state election: Burwood
| Party | Candidate | Votes | % | ±% |
|---|---|---|---|---|
| Liberal | Gordon Jackett | 12,587 | 58.0 | |
| Independent | Harrie Mitchell | 9,122 | 42.0 | |
| Total formal votes | | 21,709 | 95.1 | |
| Informal votes | | 1,114 | 4.9 | |
| Turnout | | 22,823 | 92.4 | |
| Liberal hold | | Swing | | |

=== Byron ===
1950 New South Wales state election: Byron
| Party | Candidate | Votes | % | ±% |
|---|---|---|---|---|
| Country | Stanley Stephens | unopposed | | |
| Country hold | | | | |

=== Canterbury ===
1950 New South Wales state election: Canterbury
| Party | Candidate | Votes | % | ±% |
|---|---|---|---|---|
| Labor | Arthur Tonge | 11,448 | 58.8 | |
| Liberal | Robert Bruce | 8,022 | 41.2 | |
| Total formal votes | | 19,470 | 98.8 | |
| Informal votes | | 235 | 1.2 | |
| Turnout | | 19,705 | 94.4 | |
| Labor hold | | Swing | | |

=== Casino ===
1950 New South Wales state election: Casino
| Party | Candidate | Votes | % | ±% |
|---|---|---|---|---|
| Country | John Reid | 9,546 | 66.4 | |
| Labor | Alexander Bryen | 4,840 | 33.6 | |
| Total formal votes | | 14,386 | 98.8 | |
| Informal votes | | 180 | 1.2 | |
| Turnout | | 14,566 | 93.1 | |
| Country hold | | Swing | | |

=== Castlereagh ===
1950 New South Wales state election: Castlereagh
| Party | Candidate | Votes | % | ±% |
|---|---|---|---|---|
| Labor | Jack Renshaw | 7,479 | 53.0 | |
| Country | Noel Knight | 4,589 | 32.5 | |
| Liberal | John Campbell | 1,904 | 13.5 | |
| Country | Edward Langbien | 133 | 0.9 | |
| Total formal votes | | 14,105 | 99.3 | |
| Informal votes | | 93 | 0.7 | |
| Turnout | | 14,198 | 84.6 | |
Two-party-preferred result
| Labor | Jack Renshaw | | 54.0 | |
| Country | Noel Knight | | 46.0 | |
| Labor hold | | Swing | | |

Castlereagh was expanded to include part of Cobar, including the towns of Bourke and Nyngan.

=== Cessnock ===
1950 New South Wales state election: Cessnock
| Party | Candidate | Votes | % | ±% |
|---|---|---|---|---|
| Labor | John Crook | 15,132 | 86.7 | |
| Communist | John Tapp | 2,319 | 13.3 | |
| Total formal votes | | 17,451 | 97.5 | |
| Informal votes | | 445 | 2.5 | |
| Turnout | | 17,896 | 95.0 | |
| Labor hold | | Swing | | |

=== Clarence ===
1950 New South Wales state election: Clarence
| Party | Candidate | Votes | % | ±% |
|---|---|---|---|---|
| Country | Cecil Wingfield | unopposed | | |
| Country hold | | | | |

=== Cobar ===
1950 New South Wales state election: Cobar
| Party | Candidate | Votes | % | ±% |
|---|---|---|---|---|
| Labor | Ernest Wetherell | 8,717 | 66.4 | |
| Country | Frederick Harding | 4,419 | 33.6 | |
| Total formal votes | | 13,136 | 98.5 | |
| Informal votes | | 203 | 1.5 | |
| Turnout | | 13,339 | 87.0 | |
| Labor hold | | Swing | | |

Cobar absorbed the entire district of Sturt, but lost the towns of Bourke and Nyngan to Castlereagh and South Broken Hill and Menindee to the re-constituted Sturt.

=== Collaroy ===
1950 New South Wales state election: Collaroy
| Party | Candidate | Votes | % | ±% |
|---|---|---|---|---|
| Liberal | Robert Askin | 13,107 | 63.7 | |
| Labor | John Masters | 7,472 | 36.3 | |
| Total formal votes | | 20,579 | 98.1 | |
| Informal votes | | 404 | 1.9 | |
| Turnout | | 20,983 | 92.1 | |
| Liberal notional hold | | | | |

Collaroy was a new seat created out of the districts of Hornsby and Manly, both of which were held by the Liberal party.

=== Concord ===
1950 New South Wales state election: Concord
| Party | Candidate | Votes | % | ±% |
|---|---|---|---|---|
| Liberal | John Adamson | 12,546 | 53.1 | |
| Labor | Thomas Murphy | 11,062 | 46.9 | |
| Total formal votes | | 23,608 | 98.9 | |
| Informal votes | | 264 | 1.1 | |
| Turnout | | 23,872 | 95.0 | |
| Liberal gain from Labor | | Swing | N/A | |

The sitting member, Bill Carlton (Labor), died in 1949. The 1949 by-election was won by Brice Mutton (Liberal), however he died nine months later, with John Adamson (Liberal) winning the 1950 by-election.

=== Coogee ===
1950 New South Wales state election: Coogee
| Party | Candidate | Votes | % | ±% |
|---|---|---|---|---|
| Liberal | Kevin Ellis | 11,839 | 54.3 | |
| Labor | Lou Walsh | 9,948 | 45.7 | |
| Total formal votes | | 21,787 | 98.3 | |
| Informal votes | | 385 | 1.7 | |
| Turnout | | 22,172 | 91.7 | |
| Liberal gain from Labor | | Swing | | |

The sitting member, Lou Cunningham (Labor), died in 1948. The 1948 by-election was won by Kevin Ellis (Liberal).

=== Cook's River ===
1950 New South Wales state election: Cook's River
| Party | Candidate | Votes | % | ±% |
|---|---|---|---|---|
| Labor | Joseph Cahill | 15,878 | 74.6 | |
| Liberal | Donald Clark | 4,774 | 22.4 | |
| Independent | Henry McPhillips | 624 | 2.9 | |
| Total formal votes | | 21,276 | 97.9 | |
| Informal votes | | 454 | 2.1 | |
| Turnout | | 21,730 | 95.1 | |
Two-party-preferred result
| Labor | Joseph Cahill | | 75.0 | |
| Liberal | Donald Clark | | 25.0 | |
| Labor hold | | Swing | | |

=== Croydon ===
1950 New South Wales state election: Croydon
| Party | Candidate | Votes | % | ±% |
|---|---|---|---|---|
| Liberal | David Hunter | unopposed | | |
| Liberal hold | | | | |

=== Darlinghurst ===
1950 New South Wales state election: Darlinghurst
| Party | Candidate | Votes | % | ±% |
|---|---|---|---|---|
| Liberal | John Paget | 10,553 | 47.8 | |
| Labor | Frank Finnan | 10,505 | 47.6 | |
| Communist | Adam Ogston | 1,012 | 4.6 | |
| Total formal votes | | 22,070 | 97.3 | |
| Informal votes | | 603 | 2.7 | |
| Turnout | | 22,673 | 89.0 | |
Two-party-preferred result
| Labor | Frank Finnan | 11,401 | 51.7 | |
| Liberal | John Paget | 10,669 | 48.3 | |
| Labor notional hold | | | | |

Frank Finnan (Labor) was the member for Hawkesbury.

=== Drummoyne ===
1950 New South Wales state election: Drummoyne
| Party | Candidate | Votes | % | ±% |
|---|---|---|---|---|
| Liberal | Robert Dewley | 11,402 | 54.0 | |
| Labor | Charles Halliday | 9,707 | 46.0 | |
| Total formal votes | | 21,109 | 98.5 | |
| Informal votes | | 319 | 1.5 | |
| Turnout | | 21,428 | 94.8 | |
| Liberal hold | | Swing | | |

=== Dubbo ===
1950 New South Wales state election: Dubbo
| Party | Candidate | Votes | % | ±% |
|---|---|---|---|---|
| Labor | Clarrie Robertson | 8,342 | 46.8 | |
| Country | Robert Medcalf | 5,996 | 33.6 | |
| Liberal | Joseph Roach | 3,279 | 18.4 | |
| Independent | Madge Roberts | 225 | 1.3 | |
| Total formal votes | | 17,842 | 98.7 | |
| Informal votes | | 226 | 1.3 | |
| Turnout | | 18,068 | 93.0 | |
Two-party-preferred result
| Country | Robert Medcalf | 9,177 | 51.4 | |
| Labor | Clarrie Robertson | 8,665 | 48.6 | |
| Country gain from Labor | | Swing | | |

=== Dulwich Hill ===
1950 New South Wales state election: Dulwich Hill
| Party | Candidate | Votes | % | ±% |
|---|---|---|---|---|
| Labor | George Weir | 12,732 | 54.3 | |
| Liberal | Leslie Parr | 10,732 | 45.7 | |
| Total formal votes | | 23,464 | 98.7 | |
| Informal votes | | 300 | 1.3 | |
| Turnout | | 23,764 | 91.9 | |
| Labor hold | | Swing | | |

=== Earlwood ===
1950 New South Wales state election: Earlwood
| Party | Candidate | Votes | % | ±% |
|---|---|---|---|---|
| Liberal | Eric Willis | 11,774 | 55.5 | |
| Labor | Arthur Higgins | 9,428 | 44.5 | |
| Total formal votes | | 21,202 | 98.7 | |
| Informal votes | | 274 | 1.3 | |
| Turnout | | 21,476 | 94.6 | |
| Liberal notional hold | | | | |

=== Eastwood ===
1950 New South Wales state election: Eastwood
| Party | Candidate | Votes | % | ±% |
|---|---|---|---|---|
| Liberal | Eric Hearnshaw | 14,275 | 71.4 | |
| Labor | John Birchall | 5,712 | 28.6 | |
| Total formal votes | | 19,987 | 98.2 | |
| Informal votes | | 360 | 1.8 | |
| Turnout | | 20,347 | 92.2 | |
| Liberal notional hold | | | | |

=== Georges River ===
1950 New South Wales state election: Georges River
| Party | Candidate | Votes | % | ±% |
|---|---|---|---|---|
| Labor | Arthur Williams | 12,225 | 54.7 | |
| Liberal | Charles Little | 10,146 | 45.3 | |
| Total formal votes | | 22,371 | 98.5 | |
| Informal votes | | 349 | 1.5 | |
| Turnout | | 22,720 | 94.5 | |
| Labor hold | | Swing | | |

=== Gloucester ===
1950 New South Wales state election: Gloucester
| Party | Candidate | Votes | % | ±% |
|---|---|---|---|---|
| Labor | Edward Robb | 4,792 | 30.2 | |
| Country | Ray Fitzgerald | 4,711 | 29.7 | |
| Liberal | Roderick Richardson | 3,601 | 22.7 | |
| Country | Bruce Cowan | 2,577 | 16.2 | |
| Independent | William McCristal | 180 | 1.1 | |
| Total formal votes | | 15,861 | 97.8 | |
| Informal votes | | 360 | 2.2 | |
| Turnout | | 16,221 | 90.3 | |
Two-party-preferred result
| Country | Ray Fitzgerald | 10,488 | 66.1 | |
| Labor | Edward Robb | 5,373 | 33.9 | |
| Member changed to Country from Independent | | Swing | N/A | |

=== Gordon ===
1950 New South Wales state election: Gordon
| Party | Candidate | Votes | % | ±% |
|---|---|---|---|---|
| Liberal | Harry Turner | unopposed | | |
| Liberal hold | | | | |

=== Gosford ===
1950 New South Wales state election: Gosford
| Party | Candidate | Votes | % | ±% |
|---|---|---|---|---|
| Liberal | Harold Jackson | 5,800 | 38.6 | |
| Labor | John Egan | 4,631 | 30.9 | |
| Independent | Jack Parks | 1,972 | 13.1 | |
| Independent | George Downes | 1,133 | 7.6 | |
| Independent | Walter Lloyd | 866 | 5.8 | |
| Country | William Wright | 606 | 4.0 | |
| Total formal votes | | 15,008 | 97.6 | |
| Informal votes | | 374 | 2.4 | |
| Turnout | | 15,382 | 92.3 | |
Two-party-preferred result
| Liberal | Harold Jackson | 9,254 | 61.7 | |
| Labor | John Egan | 5,754 | 38.3 | |
| Liberal notional hold | | | | |

=== Goulburn ===
1950 New South Wales state election: Goulburn
| Party | Candidate | Votes | % | ±% |
|---|---|---|---|---|
| Labor | Laurie Tully | 8,691 | 55.3 | |
| Liberal | Hubert O'Connell | 7,029 | 44.7 | |
| Total formal votes | | 15,720 | 98.7 | |
| Informal votes | | 212 | 1.3 | |
| Turnout | | 15,932 | 95.0 | |
| Labor hold | | Swing | | |

=== Granville ===
1950 New South Wales state election: Granville
| Party | Candidate | Votes | % | ±% |
|---|---|---|---|---|
| Labor | Bill Lamb | 16,061 | 66.9 | |
| Liberal | William Campbell | 7,941 | 33.1 | |
| Total formal votes | | 24,002 | 98.6 | |
| Informal votes | | 338 | 1.4 | |
| Turnout | | 24,340 | 94.5 | |
| Labor hold | | Swing | | |

=== Hamilton ===
1950 New South Wales state election: Hamilton
| Party | Candidate | Votes | % | ±% |
|---|---|---|---|---|
| Labor | George Campbell | 8,046 | 49.1 | |
| Liberal | Harry Quinlan | 7,026 | 42.9 | |
| Independent | Oscar Newton | 1,315 | 8.0 | |
| Total formal votes | | 16,387 | 98.8 | |
| Informal votes | | 198 | 1.2 | |
| Turnout | | 16,585 | 95.1 | |
Two-party-preferred result
| Labor | George Campbell | 8,445 | 51.5 | |
| Liberal | Harry Quinlan | 7,942 | 48.5 | |
| Labor hold | | Swing | | |

=== Hartley ===
1950 New South Wales state election: Hartley
| Party | Candidate | Votes | % | ±% |
|---|---|---|---|---|
| Labor | Jim Chalmers | 9,187 | 67.1 | |
| Liberal | James Cripps | 3,371 | 24.6 | |
| Communist | John King | 1,142 | 8.3 | |
| Total formal votes | | 13,700 | 98.7 | |
| Informal votes | | 173 | 1.3 | |
| Turnout | | 13,873 | 93.7 | |
Two-party-preferred result
| Labor | Jim Chalmers | | 74.1 | |
| Liberal | James Cripps | | 25.9 | |
| Labor hold | | Swing | | |

=== Hawkesbury ===
1950 New South Wales state election: Hawkesbury
| Party | Candidate | Votes | % | ±% |
|---|---|---|---|---|
| Liberal | Bernie Deane | 7,274 | 47.5 | |
| Independent | Herbert Daley | 4,711 | 30.8 | |
| Country | Greg McGirr | 3,324 | 21.7 | |
| Total formal votes | | 15,309 | 95.4 | |
| Informal votes | | 742 | 4.6 | |
| Turnout | | 16,051 | 90.7 | |
Two-candidate-preferred result
| Liberal | Bernie Deane | 9,286 | 60.7 | |
| Independent | Herbert Daley | 6,023 | 39.3 | |
| Liberal notional hold | | | | |

The redistribution made Hawkesbury a notional Liberal seat. The sitting member Frank Finnan (Labor) successfully contested the new district of Darlinghurst.

=== Hornsby ===
1950 New South Wales state election: Hornsby
| Party | Candidate | Votes | % | ±% |
|---|---|---|---|---|
| Liberal | Sydney Storey | 14,753 | 67.2 | |
| Labor | Roy Shirvington | 7,215 | 32.8 | |
| Total formal votes | | 21,968 | 98.6 | |
| Informal votes | | 303 | 1.4 | |
| Turnout | | 22,271 | 92.1 | |
| Liberal hold | | Swing | | |

=== Hurstville ===
1950 New South Wales state election: Hurstville
| Party | Candidate | Votes | % | ±% |
|---|---|---|---|---|
| Labor | Clive Evatt | 12,240 | 53.8 | |
| Liberal | Leslie Webster | 10,506 | 46.2 | |
| Total formal votes | | 22,746 | 98.7 | |
| Informal votes | | 308 | 1.3 | |
| Turnout | | 23,054 | 94.5 | |
| Labor hold | | Swing | | |

=== Illawarra ===
1950 New South Wales state election: Illawarra
| Party | Candidate | Votes | % | ±% |
|---|---|---|---|---|
| Labor | Howard Fowles | 9,196 | 60.1 | |
| Liberal | Lindsay Maynes | 6,095 | 39.9 | |
| Total formal votes | | 15,291 | 98.5 | |
| Informal votes | | 239 | 1.5 | |
| Turnout | | 15,530 | 93.7 | |
| Labor hold | | Swing | | |

=== Kahibah ===
1950 New South Wales state election: Kahibah
| Party | Candidate | Votes | % | ±% |
|---|---|---|---|---|
| Labor | Joshua Arthur | 12,633 | 69.3 | |
| Liberal | William Bourke | 5,608 | 30.7 | |
| Total formal votes | | 18,241 | 99.0 | |
| Informal votes | | 181 | 1.0 | |
| Turnout | | 18,422 | 95.3 | |
| Labor notional hold | | | | |

=== King ===
1950 New South Wales state election: King
| Party | Candidate | Votes | % | ±% |
|---|---|---|---|---|
| Labor | Daniel Clyne | 10,125 | 50.9 | |
| Lang Labor | Horace Foley | 5,313 | 26.7 | |
| Liberal | Roberta Galagher | 4,053 | 20.4 | |
| Independent | Clare Peters | 387 | 2.0 | |
| Total formal votes | | 19,878 | 96.9 | |
| Informal votes | | 639 | 3.1 | |
| Turnout | | 20,517 | 89.4 | |
Two-party-preferred result
| Labor | Daniel Clyne | | 75.0 | |
| Liberal | Roberta Galagher | | 25.0 | |
| Labor hold | | Swing | | |

=== Kogarah ===
1950 New South Wales state election: Kogarah
| Party | Candidate | Votes | % | ±% |
|---|---|---|---|---|
| Liberal | Douglas Cross | 12,209 | 51.0 | |
| Labor | Bill Crabtree | 11,707 | 49.0 | |
| Total formal votes | | 23,916 | 98.5 | |
| Informal votes | | 354 | 1.5 | |
| Turnout | | 24,270 | 95.1 | |
| Liberal gain from Labor | | Swing | | |

Kogarah was won by the Liberal Party at a by-election in 1948 caused by the death of Labor's William Currey.

=== Kurri Kurri ===
1950 New South Wales state election: Kurri Kurri
| Party | Candidate | Votes | % | ±% |
|---|---|---|---|---|
| Labor | George Booth | 14,059 | 90.0 | |
| Communist | Nellie Simm | 1,571 | 10.0 | |
| Total formal votes | | 15,630 | 97.3 | |
| Informal votes | | 437 | 2.7 | |
| Turnout | | 16,067 | 95.3 | |
| Labor hold | | Swing | | |

=== Lake Macquarie ===
1950 New South Wales state election: Lake Macquarie
| Party | Candidate | Votes | % | ±% |
|---|---|---|---|---|
| Labor | Jim Simpson | 12,805 | 71.3 | |
| Liberal | John Wilkins | 5,154 | 28.7 | |
| Total formal votes | | 17,959 | 97.9 | |
| Informal votes | | 377 | 2.1 | |
| Turnout | | 18,336 | 93.6 | |
| Labor notional hold | | | | |

=== Lakemba ===
1950 New South Wales state election: Lakemba
| Party | Candidate | Votes | % | ±% |
|---|---|---|---|---|
| Labor | Stan Wyatt | 6,527 | 33.3 | |
| Liberal | Samuel Warren | 6,353 | 32.4 | |
| Independent Labor | Fred Stanley | 6,032 | 30.8 | |
| Communist | Roy Boyd | 678 | 3.5 | |
| Total formal votes | | 19,590 | 97.8 | |
| Informal votes | | 443 | 2.2 | |
| Turnout | | 20,033 | 93.8 | |
Two-party-preferred result
| Labor | Stan Wyatt | 11,139 | 56.9 | |
| Liberal | Samuel Warren | 8,451 | 43.1 | |
| Labor hold | | Swing | | |

The sitting member was Fred Stanley who had been elected as a Labor candidate, however he was disendorsed as a result of voting in the election for the Legislative Council and stood as an Independent labor candidate.

=== Lane Cove ===
1950 New South Wales state election: Lane Cove
| Party | Candidate | Votes | % | ±% |
|---|---|---|---|---|
| Liberal | Ken McCaw | 15,470 | 70.7 | |
| Labor | Hugh Milne | 6,425 | 29.3 | |
| Total formal votes | | 21,895 | 98.7 | |
| Informal votes | | 294 | 1.3 | |
| Turnout | | 22,189 | 92.2 | |
| Liberal hold | | Swing | | |

=== Leichhardt ===
1950 New South Wales state election: Leichhardt
| Party | Candidate | Votes | % | ±% |
|---|---|---|---|---|
| Labor | Claude Matthews | 13,395 | 68.3 | |
| Liberal | Charles Shields | 5,190 | 26.5 | |
| Independent | Arthur Doughty | 1,016 | 5.2 | |
| Total formal votes | | 19,601 | 97.8 | |
| Informal votes | | 440 | 2.2 | |
| Turnout | | 20,041 | 93.7 | |
Two-party-preferred result
| Labor | Claude Matthews | | 70.0 | |
| Liberal | Charles Shields | | 30.0 | |
| Labor hold | | Swing | | |

=== Lismore ===
1950 New South Wales state election: Lismore
| Party | Candidate | Votes | % | ±% |
|---|---|---|---|---|
| Country | William Frith | 10,631 | 70.4 | |
| Labor | Francis Fredericks | 4,467 | 29.6 | |
| Total formal votes | | 15,098 | 97.6 | |
| Informal votes | | 375 | 2.4 | |
| Turnout | | 15,473 | 92.4 | |
| Country hold | | Swing | | |

=== Liverpool ===
1950 New South Wales state election: Liverpool
| Party | Candidate | Votes | % | ±% |
|---|---|---|---|---|
| Labor | James McGirr | 12,381 | 62.4 | |
| Liberal | Bernard Fitzpatrick | 6,935 | 34.9 | |
| Communist | Don Syme | 527 | 2.7 | |
| Total formal votes | | 19,843 | 98.0 | |
| Informal votes | | 401 | 2.0 | |
| Turnout | | 20,244 | 92.4 | |
Two-party-preferred result
| Labor | James McGirr | | 64.0 | |
| Liberal | Bernard Fitzpatrick | | 36.0 | |
| Labor notional hold | | | | |

=== Liverpool Plains ===
1950 New South Wales state election: Liverpool Plains
| Party | Candidate | Votes | % | ±% |
|---|---|---|---|---|
| Labor | Roger Nott | 7,851 | 51.8 | |
| Country | Frank O'Keefe | 4,791 | 31.6 | |
| Liberal | Keith Mitchell | 2,522 | 16.6 | |
| Total formal votes | | 15,164 | 99.0 | |
| Informal votes | | 147 | 1.0 | |
| Turnout | | 15,311 | 89.0 | |
Two-party-preferred result
| Labor | Roger Nott | | 54.0 | |
| Country | Frank O'Keefe | | 46.0 | |
| Labor hold | | Swing | | |

=== Maitland ===
1950 New South Wales state election: Maitland
| Party | Candidate | Votes | % | ±% |
|---|---|---|---|---|
| Liberal | Walter Howarth | 8,653 | 62.1 | |
| Labor | Kevin Barlow | 5,274 | 37.9 | |
| Total formal votes | | 13,927 | 98.7 | |
| Informal votes | | 187 | 1.3 | |
| Turnout | | 14,114 | 86.1 | |
| Liberal hold | | Swing | | |

=== Manly ===
1950 New South Wales state election: Manly
| Party | Candidate | Votes | % | ±% |
|---|---|---|---|---|
| Liberal | Douglas Darby | 13,985 | 74.5 | |
| Independent Liberal | Charles Scharkie | 4,779 | 25.5 | |
| Total formal votes | | 18,764 | 96.4 | |
| Informal votes | | 700 | 3.6 | |
| Turnout | | 19,464 | 92.6 | |
| Liberal hold | | Swing | | |

=== Maroubra ===
1950 New South Wales state election: Maroubra
| Party | Candidate | Votes | % | ±% |
|---|---|---|---|---|
| Labor | Bob Heffron | 13,329 | 63.9 | |
| Liberal | Philip Goldman | 7,521 | 36.1 | |
| Total formal votes | | 20,850 | 98.1 | |
| Informal votes | | 394 | 1.9 | |
| Turnout | | 21,244 | 92.5 | |
| Labor notional hold | | | | |

Bob Heffron (Labor) was the member for the abolished district of Botany which was largely replaced by Maroubra.

=== Marrickville ===
1950 New South Wales state election: Marrickville
| Party | Candidate | Votes | % | ±% |
|---|---|---|---|---|
| Labor | Carlo Lazzarini | 13,734 | 68.4 | |
| Liberal | Basil Mottershead | 6,347 | 31.6 | |
| Total formal votes | | 20,081 | 98.6 | |
| Informal votes | | 289 | 1.4 | |
| Turnout | | 20,370 | 93.1 | |
| Labor hold | | Swing | | |

=== Monaro ===
1950 New South Wales state election: Monaro
| Party | Candidate | Votes | % | ±% |
|---|---|---|---|---|
| Independent Labor | John Seiffert | 7,579 | 57.2 | |
| Liberal | William Keys | 5,675 | 42.8 | |
| Total formal votes | | 13,254 | 99.2 | |
| Informal votes | | 111 | 0.8 | |
| Turnout | | 13,365 | 93.4 | |
| Member changed to Independent Labor from Labor | | Swing | N/A | |

The sitting member was John Seiffert who had been elected as a Labor candidate, however he was disendorsed as a result of voting in the election for the Legislative Council and stood as an Independent labor candidate.

=== Mosman ===
1950 New South Wales state election: Mosman
| Party | Candidate | Votes | % | ±% |
|---|---|---|---|---|
| Liberal | Pat Morton | 14,912 | 77.3 | |
| Labor | Allan Matthews | 4,384 | 22.7 | |
| Total formal votes | | 19,296 | 98.7 | |
| Informal votes | | 262 | 1.3 | |
| Turnout | | 19,558 | 91.7 | |
| Liberal hold | | Swing | | |

=== Mudgee ===
1950 New South Wales state election: Mudgee
| Party | Candidate | Votes | % | ±% |
|---|---|---|---|---|
| Labor | John Breen | 7,128 | 45.9 | |
| Country | Frederick Cooke | 4,381 | 28.2 | |
| Liberal | Norman Horne | 4,019 | 25.9 | |
| Total formal votes | | 15,528 | 98.9 | |
| Informal votes | | 175 | 1.1 | |
| Turnout | | 15,703 | 94.2 | |
Two-party-preferred result
| Country | Frederick Cooke | 8,122 | 52.3 | |
| Labor | John Breen | 7,406 | 47.7 | |
| Country gain from Labor | | Swing | | |

=== Murray ===
1950 New South Wales state election: Murray
| Party | Candidate | Votes | % | ±% |
|---|---|---|---|---|
| Country | Joe Lawson | 6,067 | 36.7 | |
| Labor | James Flood | 5,245 | 31.7 | |
| Country | Ebenezer Kendell | 5,222 | 31.6 | |
| Total formal votes | | 16,534 | 99.1 | |
| Informal votes | | 143 | 0.9 | |
| Turnout | | 16,677 | 91.8 | |
Two-party-preferred result
| Country | Joe Lawson | 10,739 | 64.9 | |
| Labor | James Flood | 5,795 | 35.1 | |
| Country hold | | Swing | | |

=== Murrumbidgee ===
1950 New South Wales state election: Murrumbidgee
| Party | Candidate | Votes | % | ±% |
|---|---|---|---|---|
| Labor | George Enticknap | 9,334 | 55.5 | |
| Country | Alfred Yeo | 4,386 | 26.1 | |
| Liberal | John Oag | 3,108 | 18.5 | |
| Total formal votes | | 16,828 | 98.8 | |
| Informal votes | | 209 | 1.2 | |
Two-party-preferred result
| Labor | George Enticknap | | 57.4 | |
| Country | Alfred Yeo | | 42.6 | |
| Labor hold | | Swing | | |

=== Nepean ===
1950 New South Wales state election: Nepean
| Party | Candidate | Votes | % | ±% |
|---|---|---|---|---|
| Liberal | Joseph Jackson | 7,342 | 52.9 | |
| Independent | Allan Taylor | 6,523 | 47.1 | |
| Total formal votes | | 13,865 | 96.8 | |
| Informal votes | | 459 | 3.2 | |
| Turnout | | 14,324 | 91.9 | |
| Liberal hold | | Swing | | |

=== Neutral Bay ===
1950 New South Wales state election: Neutral Bay
| Party | Candidate | Votes | % | ±% |
|---|---|---|---|---|
| Liberal | Ivan Black | 13,791 | 72.8 | |
| Labor | Frank McCullum | 5,161 | 27.2 | |
| Total formal votes | | 18,952 | 98.6 | |
| Informal votes | | 264 | 1.4 | |
| Turnout | | 19,216 | 91.2 | |
| Liberal hold | | Swing | | |

=== Newcastle ===
1950 New South Wales state election: Newcastle
| Party | Candidate | Votes | % | ±% |
|---|---|---|---|---|
| Labor | Frank Hawkins | 12,240 | 68.6 | |
| Liberal | Eric Cupit | 4,916 | 27.5 | |
| Communist | Laurie Aarons | 694 | 3.9 | |
| Total formal votes | | 17,850 | 98.8 | |
| Informal votes | | 214 | 1.2 | |
| Turnout | | 18,064 | 94.9 | |
Two-party-preferred result
| Labor | Frank Hawkins | | 70.0 | |
| Liberal | Eric Cupit | | 30.0 | |
| Labor hold | | Swing | | |

=== Newtown-Annandale ===
1950 New South Wales state election: Newtown-Annandale
| Party | Candidate | Votes | % | ±% |
|---|---|---|---|---|
| Labor | Arthur Greenup | 11,990 | 56.1 | |
| Lang Labor | Lilian Fowler | 8,555 | 40.0 | |
| Communist | Daisy Lewin | 836 | 3.9 | |
| Total formal votes | | 21,381 | 96.6 | |
| Informal votes | | 750 | 3.4 | |
| Turnout | | 22,131 | 93.5 | |
| Labor notional hold | | | | |

- Preferences were not distributed.

Netown-Annandale was a notional Labor seat combining parts of the abolished districts of Newtown and Annandale. Lilian Fowler (Lang Labor) was the member for Newtown.

=== North Sydney ===
1950 New South Wales state election: North Sydney
| Party | Candidate | Votes | % | ±% |
|---|---|---|---|---|
| Liberal | Bjarne Halvorsen | 8,367 | 41.6 | |
| Independent Labor | James Geraghty | 7,829 | 38.9 | |
| Labor | Ray Maher | 3,921 | 19.5 | |
| Total formal votes | | 20,117 | 98.5 | |
| Informal votes | | 301 | 1.5 | |
| Turnout | | 20,418 | 93.5 | |
Two-candidate-preferred result
| Independent Labor | James Geraghty | 11,354 | 56.4 | |
| Liberal | Bjarne Halvorsen | 8,763 | 43.6 | |
| Member changed to Independent Labor from Labor | | Swing | N/A | |

The sitting member was James Geraghty who had been elected as a Labor candidate, however he was disendorsed as a result of voting in the election for the Legislative Council and stood as an independent labor candidate.

=== Orange ===
1950 New South Wales state election: Orange
| Party | Candidate | Votes | % | ±% |
|---|---|---|---|---|
| Country | Charles Cutler | 10,440 | 59.2 | |
| Labor | Francis Hoy | 7,182 | 40.8 | |
| Total formal votes | | 17,622 | 99.1 | |
| Informal votes | | 163 | 0.9 | |
| Turnout | | 17,785 | 95.3 | |
| Country hold | | Swing | | |

=== Oxley ===
1950 New South Wales state election: Oxley
| Party | Candidate | Votes | % | ±% |
|---|---|---|---|---|
| Country | Les Jordan | 11,873 | 72.0 | |
| Labor | William Baker | 4,626 | 28.0 | |
| Total formal votes | | 16,499 | 98.9 | |
| Informal votes | | 185 | 1.1 | |
| Turnout | | 16,684 | 91.7 | |
| Country hold | | Swing | | |

=== Paddington ===
1950 New South Wales state election: Paddington
| Party | Candidate | Votes | % | ±% |
|---|---|---|---|---|
| Labor | Maurice O'Sullivan | 12,962 | 64.9 | |
| Liberal | Bob Mutton | 5,948 | 29.8 | |
| Communist | Phyllis Johnson | 1,051 | 5.3 | |
| Total formal votes | | 19,961 | 98.4 | |
| Informal votes | | 326 | 1.6 | |
| Turnout | | 20,287 | 92.4 | |
Two-party-preferred result
| Labor | Maurice O'Sullivan | | 69.0 | |
| Liberal | Bob Mutton | | 31.0 | |
| Labor hold | | Swing | | |

=== Parramatta ===
1950 New South Wales state election: Parramatta
| Party | Candidate | Votes | % | ±% |
|---|---|---|---|---|
| Liberal | George Gollan | 13,800 | 58.7 | |
| Labor | Louis O'Neil | 9,689 | 41.3 | |
| Total formal votes | | 23,489 | 98.4 | |
| Informal votes | | 378 | 1.6 | |
| Turnout | | 23,867 | 94.0 | |
| Liberal hold | | Swing | | |

=== Phillip ===
1950 New South Wales state election: Phillip
| Party | Candidate | Votes | % | ±% |
|---|---|---|---|---|
| Labor | Tom Shannon | 15,390 | 78.7 | |
| Liberal | Henry Clarke | 4,161 | 21.3 | |
| Total formal votes | | 19,551 | 97.2 | |
| Informal votes | | 566 | 2.8 | |
| Turnout | | 20,117 | 89.3 | |
| Labor hold | | Swing | | |

=== Raleigh ===
1950 New South Wales state election: Raleigh
| Party | Candidate | Votes | % | ±% |
|---|---|---|---|---|
| Country | Roy Vincent | unopposed | | |
| Country hold | | | | |

=== Randwick ===
1950 New South Wales state election: Randwick
| Party | Candidate | Votes | % | ±% |
|---|---|---|---|---|
| Labor | William Gollan | 10,847 | 52.9 | |
| Liberal | Gerald Davis | 9,650 | 47.1 | |
| Total formal votes | | 20,497 | 98.2 | |
| Informal votes | | 372 | 1.8 | |
| Turnout | | 20,869 | 92.6 | |
| Labor hold | | Swing | | |

=== Redfern ===
1950 New South Wales state election: Redfern
| Party | Candidate | Votes | % | ±% |
|---|---|---|---|---|
| Labor | Fred Green | 14,981 | 74.0 | |
| Liberal | Phillip Pethers | 3,401 | 16.8 | |
| Independent Labor | Frederick Fairbrother | 1,129 | 5.6 | |
| Communist | Mervyn Pidcock | 738 | 3.6 | |
| Total formal votes | | 20,249 | 96.7 | |
| Informal votes | | 684 | 3.3 | |
| Turnout | | 20,933 | 92.7 | |
Two-party-preferred result
| Labor | Fred Green | | 81.0 | |
| Liberal | Phillip Pethers | | 19.0 | |
| Labor hold | | Swing | | |

=== Rockdale ===
1950 New South Wales state election: Rockdale
| Party | Candidate | Votes | % | ±% |
|---|---|---|---|---|
| Labor | John McGrath | 13,083 | 54.0 | |
| Liberal | George McGuire | 11,166 | 46.0 | |
| Total formal votes | | 24,249 | 98.6 | |
| Informal votes | | 340 | 1.4 | |
| Turnout | | 24,589 | 94.6 | |
| Labor hold | | Swing | | |

=== Ryde ===
1950 New South Wales state election: Ryde
| Party | Candidate | Votes | % | ±% |
|---|---|---|---|---|
| Liberal | Ken Anderson | 11,077 | 51.1 | |
| Labor | Frank Downing | 10,598 | 48.9 | |
| Total formal votes | | 21,675 | 98.2 | |
| Informal votes | | 400 | 1.8 | |
| Turnout | | 22,075 | 94.1 | |
| Liberal hold | | Swing | | |

=== South Coast ===
1950 New South Wales state election: South Coast
| Party | Candidate | Votes | % | ±% |
|---|---|---|---|---|
| Liberal | Jack Beale | 10,340 | 67.5 | |
| Labor | Alfred Berriman | 4,980 | 32.5 | |
| Total formal votes | | 15,320 | 98.1 | |
| Informal votes | | 296 | 1.9 | |
| Turnout | | 15,616 | 93.6 | |
| Member changed to Liberal from Independent | | Swing | N/A | |

=== Sturt ===
1950 New South Wales state election: Sturt
| Party | Candidate | Votes | % | ±% |
|---|---|---|---|---|
| Labor | William Wattison | unopposed | | |
| Labor hold | | | | |

Sturt was reconstituted, with the former district being absorbed by Cobar. The new district comprised part of Cobar, including the towns of South Broken Hill and Menindee, part of Murray, and the western part of the abolished district of Lachlan.

=== Sutherland ===
1950 New South Wales state election: Sutherland
| Party | Candidate | Votes | % | ±% |
|---|---|---|---|---|
| Liberal | Cecil Monro | 10,718 | 52.2 | |
| Labor | Gough Whitlam | 9,807 | 47.8 | |
| Total formal votes | | 20,525 | 98.8 | |
| Informal votes | | 251 | 1.2 | |
| Turnout | | 20,776 | 93.8 | |
| Liberal win | | (new seat) | | |

=== Tamworth ===
1950 New South Wales state election: Tamworth
| Party | Candidate | Votes | % | ±% |
|---|---|---|---|---|
| Country | Bill Chaffey | unopposed | | |
| Country hold | | | | |

=== Temora ===
1950 New South Wales state election: Temora
| Party | Candidate | Votes | % | ±% |
|---|---|---|---|---|
| Country | Doug Dickson | unopposed | | |
| Country hold | | | | |

=== Tenterfield ===
1950 New South Wales state election: Tenterfield
| Party | Candidate | Votes | % | ±% |
|---|---|---|---|---|
| Country | Michael Bruxner | 9,669 | 60.0 | |
| Independent Country | Ben Wade | 6,445 | 40.0 | |
| Total formal votes | | 16,114 | 96.4 | |
| Informal votes | | 600 | 3.6 | |
| Turnout | | 16,714 | 92.1 | |
| Country hold | | Swing | | |

=== Upper Hunter ===
1950 New South Wales state election: Upper Hunter
| Party | Candidate | Votes | % | ±% |
|---|---|---|---|---|
| Country | D'Arcy Rose | 9,512 | 63.1 | |
| Labor | Leonard Neville | 5,571 | 36.9 | |
| Total formal votes | | 15,083 | 98.3 | |
| Informal votes | | 261 | 1.7 | |
| Turnout | | 15,344 | 85.9 | |
| Country hold | | Swing | | |

=== Vaucluse ===
1950 New South Wales state election: Vaucluse
| Party | Candidate | Votes | % | ±% |
|---|---|---|---|---|
| Liberal | Murray Robson | 12,658 | 68.4 | |
| Labor | Harold Levien | 5,097 | 27.5 | |
| Independent Liberal | Tasman Crocker | 759 | 4.1 | |
| Total formal votes | | 18,514 | 98.6 | |
| Informal votes | | 257 | 1.4 | |
| Turnout | | 18,771 | 91.4 | |
Two-party-preferred result
| Liberal | Murray Robson | | 72.0 | |
| Labor | Harold Levien | | 28.0 | |
| Liberal hold | | Swing | | |

=== Wagga Wagga ===
1950 New South Wales state election: Wagga Wagga
| Party | Candidate | Votes | % | ±% |
|---|---|---|---|---|
| Labor | Eddie Graham | 9,509 | 59.9 | |
| Liberal | Ivan Jack | 3,792 | 23.9 | |
| Country | Richard Blamey | 2,575 | 16.2 | |
| Total formal votes | | 15,876 | 98.8 | |
| Informal votes | | 190 | 1.2 | |
| Turnout | | 16,066 | 94.0 | |
Two-party-preferred result
| Labor | Eddie Graham | | 61.0 | |
| Liberal | Ivan Jack | | 39.0 | |
| Labor hold | | Swing | | |

=== Waratah ===
1950 New South Wales state election: Waratah
| Party | Candidate | Votes | % | ±% |
|---|---|---|---|---|
| Labor | Robert Cameron | 12,114 | 66.4 | |
| Liberal | Harold Hollis | 6,140 | 33.6 | |
| Total formal votes | | 18,254 | 98.6 | |
| Informal votes | | 262 | 1.4 | |
| Turnout | | 18,516 | 95.5 | |
| Labor hold | | Swing | | |

=== Waverley ===
1950 New South Wales state election: Waverley
| Party | Candidate | Votes | % | ±% |
|---|---|---|---|---|
| Labor | Clarrie Martin | 11,415 | 60.9 | |
| Liberal | Ross McKinnon | 7,324 | 39.1 | |
| Total formal votes | | 18,739 | 98.9 | |
| Informal votes | | 215 | 1.1 | |
| Turnout | | 18,954 | 91.1 | |
| Labor hold | | Swing | | |

=== Willoughby ===
1950 New South Wales state election: Willoughby
| Party | Candidate | Votes | % | ±% |
|---|---|---|---|---|
| Liberal | George Brain | 14,381 | 68.0 | |
| Labor | Brian White | 6,776 | 32.0 | |
| Total formal votes | | 21,157 | 99.0 | |
| Informal votes | | 217 | 1.0 | |
| Turnout | | 21,374 | 93.7 | |
| Liberal hold | | Swing | | |

=== Wollondilly ===
1950 New South Wales state election: Wollondilly
| Party | Candidate | Votes | % | ±% |
|---|---|---|---|---|
| Liberal | Blake Pelly | 8,615 | 65.9 | |
| Independent | Gerard Wylie | 3,323 | 25.4 | |
| Independent | Erle Sampson | 1,127 | 8.6 | |
| Total formal votes | | 13,065 | 96.7 | |
| Informal votes | | 445 | 3.3 | |
| Turnout | | 13,510 | 91.6 | |
| Liberal hold | | Swing | N/A | |

- Preferences were not distributed.

=== Wollongong-Kembla ===
1950 New South Wales state election: Wollongong-Kembla
| Party | Candidate | Votes | % | ±% |
|---|---|---|---|---|
| Labor | Rex Connor | 7,808 | 47.9 | |
| Liberal | Gerald Sargent | 6,520 | 40.0 | |
| Independent | Henry Graham | 1,982 | 12.2 | |
| Total formal votes | | 16,310 | 98.6 | |
| Informal votes | | 234 | 1.4 | |
| Turnout | | 16,544 | 95.2 | |
Two-party-preferred result
| Labor | Rex Connor | 8,484 | 52.0 | |
| Liberal | Gerald Sargent | 7,826 | 48.0 | |
| Labor hold | | Swing | | |

=== Woollahra ===
1950 New South Wales state election: Woollahra
| Party | Candidate | Votes | % | ±% |
|---|---|---|---|---|
| Liberal | Vernon Treatt | 14,595 | 76.1 | |
| Labor | William Harcourt | 4,587 | 23.9 | |
| Total formal votes | | 19,182 | 98.3 | |
| Informal votes | | 324 | 1.7 | |
| Turnout | | 19,506 | 87.7 | |
| Liberal hold | | Swing | | |

=== Young ===
1950 New South Wales state election: Young
| Party | Candidate | Votes | % | ±% |
|---|---|---|---|---|
| Labor | Fred Cahill | 9,568 | 51.4 | |
| Country | Douglas Beard | 5,282 | 28.4 | |
| Liberal | Percy Richardson | 3,761 | 20.2 | |
| Total formal votes | | 18,611 | 99.3 | |
| Informal votes | | 135 | 0.7 | |
| Turnout | | 18,746 | 94.6 | |
Two-party-preferred result
| Labor | Fred Cahill | | 53.0 | |
| Country | Douglas Beard | | 47.0 | |
| Labor hold | | Swing | | |

== See also ==
- Candidates of the 1950 New South Wales state election
- Members of the New South Wales Legislative Assembly, 1950–1953
