= Members of the New South Wales Legislative Assembly, 1947–1950 =

Members of the New South Wales Legislative Assembly who served in the 35th parliament held their seats from 1947 to 1950. They were elected at the 1947 state election, and at by-elections. The Speaker was Bill Lamb.

Name	Party	Electorate	Term in office
John Adamson (Note: Concord Liberal MLA Brice Mutton, who had only won a by-election the previous year, died on 7 December 1949. Liberal candidate John Adamson won the resulting by-election on 11 February 1950.)	Liberal	Concord	1950–1953
Joshua Arthur	Labor	Hamilton	1935–1953
Jack Baddeley (Note: Cessnock Labor MLA Jack Baddeley resigned on 8 September 1949 to accept an appointment as Chairman of the State Coal Mine Authority. Labor candidate John Crook won the resulting by-election on 8 October.)	Labor	Cessnock	1922–1949
Jeff Bate (Note: Wollondilly Liberal MLA Jeff Bate resigned on 28 October 1949 to contest the seat of Macarthur at the 1949 federal election. Liberal candidate Blake Pelly was elected unopposed on 23 January.)	Liberal	Wollondilly	1938–1949
Jack Beale	Independent/Liberal	South Coast	1942–1973
Ivan Black	Liberal	Neutral Bay	1945–1951, 1951–1962
George Booth	Labor	Kurri Kurri	1925–1960
George Brain	Liberal	Willoughby	1943–1968
Michael Bruxner	Country	Tenterfield	1920–1962
Fred Cahill	Labor	Young	1941–1959
Joseph Cahill	Labor	Cook's River	1925–1959
Robert Cameron	Labor	Waratah	1927–1956
Bill Carlton (Note: Concord Labor MLA Bill Carlton died on 30 January 1949. Liberal candidate Brice Mutton won the resulting by-election on 12 March.)	Labor	Concord	1935–1949
Bill Chaffey	Country	Tamworth	1940–1973
Jim Chalmers (Note: Albury MLA Doug Padman was endorsed by both the Liberal and Country parties at the 1947 election, but sat in parliament as a Liberal.)	Labor	Hartley	1947–1956
Daniel Clyne	Labor	King	1927–1956
John Crook	Labor	Cessnock	1949–1959
Douglas Cross (Note: Kogarah Labor MLA William Currey died on 30 April 1948. Liberal candidate Douglas Cross won the resulting by-election on 17 July.)	Liberal	Kogarah	1948–1953, 1956–1970
Lou Cunningham (Note: Coogee Labor MLA Lou Cunningham died on 23 March 1948. Liberal candidate Kevin Ellis won the resulting by-election on 8 May.)	Labor	Coogee	1941–1948
William Currey	Labor	Kogarah	1941–1948
Charles Cutler	Country	Orange	1947–1975
Douglas Darby	Liberal	Manly	1945–1978
Mat Davidson (Note: Cobar Labor MLA Mat Davidson died on 9 January 1949. Labor candidate Ernest Wetherell won the resulting by-election on 12 March.)	Labor	Cobar	1918–1949
Billy Davies (Note: Wollongong-Kembla Labor MLA Billy Davies resigned on 28 October 1949 to contest the seat of Cunningham at the 1949 federal election. Labor candidate Baden Powell won the resulting by-election on 11 February 1950.)	Labor	Wollongong-Kembla	1917–1949
Robert Dewley	Liberal	Drummoyne	1947–1953
Doug Dickson	Country	Temora	1938–1960
Edgar Dring	Labor	Ashburnham	1941–1955
David Drummond (Note: Armidale Country Party MLA David Drummond resigned on 28 October 1949 to contest the seat of New England at the 1949 federal election. Country Party candidate Davis Hughes won the resulting by-election on 11 February 1950.)	Country	Armidale	1920–1949
Bill Dunn	Labor	Mudgee	1910–1911, 1911–1932, 1935–1950
Kevin Dwyer (Note: Redfern Labor MLA George Noble died on 9 July 1949. Labor candidate Kevin Dwyer won the resulting by-election on 8 October.)	Labor	Redfern	1949–1950
Kevin Ellis	Liberal	Coogee	1948–1953, 1956–1962, 1965–1973
George Enticknap	Labor	Murrumbidgee	1941–1965
Clive Evatt	Labor	Hurstville	1939–1959
Frank Finnan	Labor	Hawkesbury	1941–1953
Ray Fitzgerald	Independent/Country	Gloucester	1941–1962
Lilian Fowler	Lang Labor	Newtown	1944–1950
Howard Fowles	Labor	Illawarra	1941–1968
John Freeman	Labor	Blacktown	1945–1959
William Frith	Country	Lismore	1933–1953
James Geraghty (Note: The Labor Party expelled four MLAs before the 1950 election – James Geraghty (North Sydney), John Seiffert (Monaro), Roy Heferen (Barwon) and Fred Stanley (Lakemba) for not following the party's endorsed ticket in a Legislative Council election. All four served out the remainder of their terms as independents.)	Labor/Independent Labor	North Sydney	1941–1953
George Gollan	Liberal	Parramatta	1932–1953
William Gollan	Labor	Randwick	1941–1962
Bob Gorman	Labor	Annandale	1933–1950
Eddie Graham	Labor	Wagga Wagga	1941–1957
Raymond Hamilton	Labor	Namoi	1941–1950
Frank Hawkins	Labor	Newcastle	1935–1968
Eric Hearnshaw	Liberal	Ryde	1945–1965
Roy Heferen	Labor/Independent Labor	Barwon	1940–1950
Robert Heffron	Labor	Botany	1930–1968
Walter Howarth	Liberal	Maitland	1932–1956
Davis Hughes	Country	Armidale	1950–1953, 1956–1973
David Hunter	Liberal	Croydon	1940–1976
Gordon Jackett	Liberal	Burwood	1935–1951
Joseph Jackson	Liberal	Nepean	1922–1956
Les Jordan	Country	Oxley	1944–1965
Gus Kelly	Labor	Bathurst	1925–1932, 1935–1967
Laurie Kelly	Labor	Bulli	1947–1955
Ebenezer Kendell	Country	Corowa	1946–1950
Hamilton Knight	Labor	Hartley	1927–1947
Bill Lamb	Labor	Granville	1938–1962
Abe Landa	Labor	Bondi	1930–1965
Chris Lang	Lang Labor	Auburn	1946–1950
Joe Lawson	Country	Murray	1932–1973
Carlo Lazzarini	Labor	Marrickville	1917–1952
Clarrie Martin	Labor	Waverley	1930–1932, 1939–1953
Claude Matthews	Labor	Leichhardt	1934–1954
Ken McCaw	Liberal	Lane Cove	1947–1975
James McGirr	Labor	Bankstown	1922–1952
John McGrath	Labor	Rockdale	1941–1959
Robert Medcalf	Country	Lachlan	1947–1953
Pat Morton	Liberal	Mosman	1947–1972
Brice Mutton	Liberal	Concord	1949
George Noble	Labor	Redfern	1947–1949
Roger Nott	Labor	Liverpool Plains	1941–1961
Maurice O'Sullivan	Labor	Paddington	1927–1959
Doug Padman	Liberal	Albury	1947–1965
Blake Pelly	Liberal	Wollondilly	1950–1957
Baden Powell	Labor	Wollongong-Kembla	1950
Mary Quirk	Labor	Balmain	1939–1950
John Reid	Country	Casino	1930–1953
Jack Renshaw	Labor	Castlereagh	1941–1980
Athol Richardson	Liberal	Ashfield	1935–1946, 1946–1952
Clarrie Robertson	Labor	Dubbo	1942–1950, 1953–1959
Murray Robson	Liberal	Vaucluse	1936–1957
D'Arcy Rose	Country	Upper Hunter	1939–1959
John Seiffert	Labor/Independent Labor	Monaro	1941–1965
Tom Shannon	Labor	Phillip	1927–1954
Bill Sheahan	Labor	Yass	1941–1973
Fred Stanley	Labor/Independent Labor	Lakemba	1927–1950
Stanley Stephens	Country	Byron	1944–1973
Sydney Storey	Liberal	Hornsby	1941–1962
Arthur Tonge	Labor	Canterbury	1926–1932, 1935–1962
Vernon Treatt	Liberal	Woollahra	1938–1962
Laurie Tully	Labor	Goulburn	1946–1965
Harry Turner	Liberal	Gordon	1937–1952
Roy Vincent	Country	Raleigh	1922–1953
William Wattison	Labor	Sturt	1947–1968
George Weir	Labor	Dulwich Hill	1941–1953
Ernest Wetherell	Labor	Cobar	1949–1965
Arthur Williams	Labor	Georges River	1940–1956
Cecil Wingfield	Country	Clarence	1938–1955

== See also ==
- Second McGirr ministry
- Results of the 1947 New South Wales state election
- Candidates of the 1947 New South Wales state election
