= Electoral results for the district of Concord =

Election results for Concord, New South Wales, Australia

Concord, an electoral district of the Legislative Assembly in the Australian state of New South Wales was created in 1930 and abolished in 1968.

| Election | Member | Party |
|---|---|---|
| 1930 | Henry McDicken | Labor |
| 1932 | Stan Lloyd | United Australia |
| 1935 | Stan Lloyd | United Australia |
| 1938 | Stan Lloyd | United Australia |
| 1941 | Bill Carlton | Labor |
| 1944 | Bill Carlton | Labor |
| 1947 | Bill Carlton | Labor |
| 1949 by | Brice Mutton | Liberal |
| 1950 by | John Adamson | Liberal |
| 1950 | John Adamson | Liberal |
| 1953 | Thomas Murphy | Labor |
| 1956 | Thomas Murphy | Labor |
| 1959 | Thomas Murphy | Labor |
| 1962 | Thomas Murphy | Labor |
| 1965 | Thomas Murphy | Labor |

== Election results ==
=== Elections in the 1960s ===
==== 1965 ====
1965 New South Wales state election: Concord
| Party | Candidate | Votes | % | ±% |
|---|---|---|---|---|
| Labor | Thomas Murphy | 10,883 | 47.8 | −5.6 |
| Liberal | Lerryn Mutton | 10,721 | 47.1 | +3.3 |
| Democratic Labor | William Doherty | 1,155 | 5.1 | +2.3 |
| Total formal votes | | 22,759 | 97.8 | −1.0 |
| Informal votes | | 509 | 2.2 | +1.0 |
| Turnout | | 23,268 | 94.7 | +0.5 |
Two-party-preferred result
| Labor | Thomas Murphy | 11,425 | 50.2 | −3.7 |
| Liberal | Lerryn Mutton | 11,334 | 49.8 | +3.7 |
| Labor hold | | Swing | −3.7 | |

==== 1962 ====
1962 New South Wales state election: Concord
| Party | Candidate | Votes | % | ±% |
|---|---|---|---|---|
| Labor | Thomas Murphy | 12,896 | 53.4 | +4.3 |
| Liberal | Lerryn Mutton | 10,593 | 43.8 | −1.6 |
| Democratic Labor | John Winters | 682 | 2.8 | −2.7 |
| Total formal votes | | 24,171 | 98.8 | |
| Informal votes | | 295 | 1.2 | |
| Turnout | | 24,466 | 94.2 | |
Two-party-preferred result
| Labor | Thomas Murphy | 13,032 | 53.9 | +2.3 |
| Liberal | Lerryn Mutton | 11,139 | 46.1 | −2.3 |
| Labor hold | | Swing | +2.3 | |

=== Elections in the 1950s ===
==== 1959 ====
1959 New South Wales state election: Concord
| Party | Candidate | Votes | % | ±% |
|---|---|---|---|---|
| Labor | Thomas Murphy | 11,165 | 49.1 | |
| Liberal | Lerryn Mutton | 10,333 | 45.4 | |
| Democratic Labor | Jack Kane | 1,258 | 5.5 | |
| Total formal votes | | 22,756 | 98.3 | |
| Informal votes | | 400 | 1.7 | |
| Turnout | | 23,156 | 94.6 | |
Two-party-preferred result
| Labor | Thomas Murphy | 11,753 | 51.7 | |
| Liberal | Lerryn Mutton | 11,003 | 48.3 | |
| Labor hold | | Swing | | |

==== 1956 ====
1956 New South Wales state election: Concord
| Party | Candidate | Votes | % | ±% |
|---|---|---|---|---|
| Liberal | Lerryn Mutton | 10,231 | 49.2 | +3.9 |
| Labor | Thomas Murphy | 9,833 | 47.2 | −7.5 |
| Communist | Leslie Greenfield | 749 | 3.6 | +3.6 |
| Total formal votes | | 20,813 | 98.2 | +0.1 |
| Informal votes | | 375 | 1.8 | −0.1 |
| Turnout | | 21,188 | 94.1 | −0.2 |
Two-party-preferred result
| Labor | Thomas Murphy | 10,450 | 50.2 | −4.5 |
| Liberal | Lerryn Mutton | 10,363 | 49.8 | +4.5 |
| Labor hold | | Swing | −4.5 | |

==== 1953 ====
1953 New South Wales state election: Concord
| Party | Candidate | Votes | % | ±% |
|---|---|---|---|---|
| Labor | Thomas Murphy | 11,661 | 54.7 | |
| Liberal | John Adamson | 9,673 | 45.3 | |
| Total formal votes | | 21,334 | 98.1 | |
| Informal votes | | 421 | 1.9 | |
| Turnout | | 21,755 | 94.3 | |
| Labor gain from Liberal | | Swing | | |

==== 1950 ====
1950 New South Wales state election: Concord
| Party | Candidate | Votes | % | ±% |
|---|---|---|---|---|
| Liberal | John Adamson | 12,546 | 53.1 | |
| Labor | Thomas Murphy | 11,062 | 46.9 | |
| Total formal votes | | 23,608 | 98.9 | |
| Informal votes | | 264 | 1.1 | |
| Turnout | | 23,872 | 95.0 | |
| Liberal gain from Labor | | Swing | N/A | |

The sitting member, Bill Carlton (Labor), died in 1949. The 1949 by-election was won by Brice Mutton (Liberal), however he died nine months later, with John Adamson (Liberal) winning the 1950 by-election.

==== 1950 by-election ====
1950 Concord by-election Saturday 11 February
| Party | Candidate | Votes | % | ±% |
|---|---|---|---|---|
| Liberal | John Adamson | 11,495 | 51.1 | +1.1 |
| Labor | Hector McDonald | 11,020 | 48.9 | −1.1 |
| Total formal votes | | 22,515 | 98.9 | +0.8 |
| Informal votes | | 258 | 1.1 | −0.8 |
| Turnout | | 22,773 | 89.2 | −1.5 |
| Liberal hold | | Swing | +1.1 | |

The by-election was caused by the death of Brice Mutton (Liberal).

=== Elections in the 1940s ===
==== 1949 by-election ====
1949 Concord by-election Saturday 12 March
| Party | Candidate | Votes | % | ±% |
|---|---|---|---|---|
| Liberal | Brice Mutton | 10,495 | 47.0 | |
| Labor | James Moloney | 9,353 | 21.9 | |
| Lang Labor | Lyle Armstrong | 2,503 | 11.2 | |
| Total formal votes | | 22,351 | 98.1 | −0.4 |
| Informal votes | | 422 | 1.9 | +0.4 |
| Turnout | | 22,773 | 90.7 | −5.2 |
Two-party-preferred result
| Liberal | Brice Mutton | 11,184 | 50.04 | +3.64 |
| Labor | James Moloney | 11,167 | 49.96 | −3.64 |
| Liberal gain from Labor | | Swing | 3.64 | |

The by-election was caused by the death of Bill Carlton (Labor).

==== 1947 ====
1947 New South Wales state election: Concord
| Party | Candidate | Votes | % | ±% |
|---|---|---|---|---|
| Labor | Bill Carlton | 12,387 | 53.6 | +9.4 |
| Liberal | Brice Mutton | 10,722 | 46.4 | +26.9 |
| Total formal votes | | 23,109 | 98.5 | +1.3 |
| Informal votes | | 354 | 1.5 | −1.3 |
| Turnout | | 23,463 | 95.9 | +3.1 |
| Labor hold | | Swing | N/A | |

==== 1944 ====
1944 New South Wales state election: Concord
| Party | Candidate | Votes | % | ±% |
|---|---|---|---|---|
| Labor | Bill Carlton | 9,055 | 44.2 | −1.5 |
| Liberal Democratic | Brice Mutton | 4,279 | 20.9 | +20.9 |
| Democratic | Roland Murray | 4,001 | 19.5 | −21.2 |
| Lang Labor | Gustav Truer | 3,174 | 15.5 | +15.5 |
| Total formal votes | | 20,509 | 97.2 | −0.9 |
| Informal votes | | 590 | 2.8 | +0.9 |
| Turnout | | 21,099 | 92.8 | −0.8 |
After distribution of preferences
| Labor | Bill Carlton | 11,600 | 56.6 | |
| Liberal Democratic | Brice Mutton | 4,693 | 22.9 | |
| Democratic | Roland Murray | 4,216 | 20.6 | |
| Labor hold | | Swing | N/A | |

- Preferences were not distributed to completion.

==== 1941 ====
1941 New South Wales state election: Concord
| Party | Candidate | Votes | % | ±% |
|---|---|---|---|---|
| Labor | Bill Carlton | 8,982 | 45.7 | |
| United Australia | Stan Lloyd | 7,984 | 40.7 | |
| State Labor | Rupert Lockwood | 2,671 | 13.6 | |
| Total formal votes | | 19,637 | 98.1 | |
| Informal votes | | 371 | 1.9 | |
| Turnout | | 20,008 | 93.4 | |
Two-party-preferred result
| Labor | Bill Carlton | 11,130 | 56.7 | |
| United Australia | Stan Lloyd | 8,507 | 43.3 | |
| Labor gain from United Australia | | Swing | | |

=== Elections in the 1930s ===
==== 1938 ====
1938 New South Wales state election: Concord
| Party | Candidate | Votes | % | ±% |
|---|---|---|---|---|
| United Australia | Stan Lloyd | 10,489 | 56.4 | +5.5 |
| Labor | Leonard Thompson | 8,121 | 43.6 | +3.6 |
| Total formal votes | | 18,610 | 98.3 | +0.4 |
| Informal votes | | 317 | 1.7 | −0.4 |
| Turnout | | 18,927 | 96.7 | −1.0 |
| United Australia hold | | Swing | N/A | |

==== 1935 ====
1935 New South Wales state election: Concord
| Party | Candidate | Votes | % | ±% |
|---|---|---|---|---|
| United Australia | Stan Lloyd | 9,101 | 50.9 | −5.2 |
| Labor (NSW) | Alan McNamara | 7,151 | 40.0 | −3.2 |
| Federal Labor | Henry McDicken | 1,219 | 6.8 | +6.8 |
| Centre | Aubrey Murphy | 391 | 2.2 | +2.2 |
| Total formal votes | | 17,862 | 97.9 | −0.6 |
| Informal votes | | 383 | 2.1 | +0.6 |
| Turnout | | 18,245 | 97.7 | +0.4 |
| United Australia hold | | Swing | N/A | |

- Preferences were not distributed.

==== 1932 ====
1932 New South Wales state election: Concord
| Party | Candidate | Votes | % | ±% |
|---|---|---|---|---|
| United Australia | Stan Lloyd | 9,773 | 56.1 | +17.6 |
| Labor (NSW) | Henry McDicken | 7,528 | 43.2 | −18.3 |
| Communist | Robert Thomson | 111 | 0.6 | +0.6 |
| Total formal votes | | 17,412 | 98.5 | −0.5 |
| Informal votes | | 259 | 1.5 | +0.5 |
| Turnout | | 17,671 | 97.3 | +0.2 |
| United Australia gain from Labor (NSW) | | Swing | N/A | |

- Preferences were not distributed.

==== 1930 ====
1930 New South Wales state election: Concord
| Party | Candidate | Votes | % | ±% |
|---|---|---|---|---|
| Labor | Henry McDicken | 10,702 | 61.5 | |
| Nationalist | Frederick Stewart | 6,708 | 38.5 | |
| Total formal votes | | 17,410 | 99.0 | |
| Informal votes | | 169 | 1.0 | |
| Turnout | | 17,579 | 97.1 | |
| Labor win | | (new seat) | | |

Concord was a new seat, and comprised part of the district of Ryde and the abolished district of Eastwood. Henry McDicken (Labor) was the member for Ryde.
