= Results of the 1947 New South Wales state election =

State election for New South Wales, Australia in May 1947

New South Wales state election, 3 May 1947 Legislative Assembly << 1944–1950 >>
Enrolled voters	1,852,787 (Note: There were 1,713,921 enrolled voters in 82 contested electorates and 138,866 were enrolled in 8 uncontested electorates (5 Labor and 3 Country).)				
Votes cast	1,621,257		Turnout	94.61	+3.19
Informal votes	32,262		Informal	1.99	−1.14
Summary of votes by party
Party	Primary votes	%	Swing	Seats	Change
Labor	730,194	45.95	+ 0.75	52	−4
Liberal (Note: Includes Doug Padman (Albury) and Ray Bladwell (Goulburn) who were jointly endorsed by the Liberal and Country parties.) (Note: Swing and change are compared to the Democratic Party at the 1944 election.)	485,286	30.50	+5.34	19	+7
Country	162,467	10.22	−0.19	15	+5
Independent	94,163	5.92	+0.20	2	−3
Lang Labor	64,851	4.08	−5.25	2	−
Communist	27,237	1.71	−0.03	0	−
Independent Labor	13,917	0.88	−0.91	0	−
Independent Liberal (Note: Swing and change are compared to Independent Democrat at the 1944 election.)	11,150	0.49	-1.92	0	−4
Protestant Labour	3,361	0.21	+0.21	0	−
Other			-4.50		−1
Total	1,589,265			90	

This is a list of electoral district results for the 1947 New South Wales state election.

== Results by electoral district ==
=== Albury ===
1947 New South Wales state election: Albury
Party	Candidate	Votes	%	±%
Liberal	Doug Padman (Note: Jointly endorsed by the Liberal and Country parties.)	7,561	50.1	−3.0
Labor	John Hurley	7,533	49.9	+3.0
Total formal votes		15,094	99.1	+1.2
Informal votes		141	0.9	−1.2
Turnout		15,235	94.2	+4.3
Liberal hold		Swing	−3.0	

- John Hurley (Labor) won the seat at the 1946 by-election, but it was regained by the Doug Padman (Liberal).

=== Annandale ===
1947 New South Wales state election: Annandale
Party	Candidate	Votes	%	±%
Labor	Bob Gorman	11,336	57.4	+1.2
Lang Labor	George Stanley	8,426	42.6	+6.1
Total formal votes		19,762	95.5	+0.8
Informal votes		937	4.5	−0.8
Turnout		20,699	94.8	+3.0
Labor hold		Swing	N/A	

=== Armidale ===
1947 New South Wales state election: Armidale
Party	Candidate	Votes	%	±%
Country	David Drummond	7,616	56.0	+4.7
Labor	Francis Harvison	5,982	44.0	−4.7
Total formal votes		13,598	98.8	+0.9
Informal votes		164	1.2	−0.9
Turnout		13,762	93.2	+2.4
Country hold		Swing	+4.7	

=== Ashburnham ===
1947 New South Wales state election: Ashburnham
Party	Candidate	Votes	%	±%
Labor	Edgar Dring	6,472	47.5	−10.9
Liberal	Holman Cockram	3,671	26.9	+26.9
Country	Hilton Elliott	3,481	25.6	−16.0
Total formal votes		13,624	98.6	+0.6
Informal votes		194	1.4	
Turnout		13,818	95.9	+4.5
Two-party-preferred result
Labor	Edgar Dring	6,921	50.8	−7.6
Liberal	Holman Cockram	6,703	49.2	+49.2
Labor hold		Swing	−7.6	

=== Ashfield ===
1947 New South Wales state election: Ashfield
Party	Candidate	Votes	%	±%
Liberal	Athol Richardson	12,996	58.2	+4.8
Labor	William Peters	9,332	41.8	−4.8
Total formal votes		22,328	98.7	+1.9
Informal votes		284	1.3	−1.9
Turnout		22,612	96.1	+2.3
Liberal hold		Swing	+4.8	

=== Auburn ===
1947 New South Wales state election: Auburn
Party	Candidate	Votes	%	±%
Lang Labor	Chris Lang	10,263	46.2	−19.6
Labor	Frank Peffer	6,160	27.8	−6.4
Independent	Alexander Kerr	4,929	22.2	+22.2
Communist	Stanley Roy	849	3.8	+3.8
Total formal votes		22,201	97.2	+1.1
Informal votes		648	2.8	−1.1
Turnout		22,849	95.4	+2.3
Two-candidate-preferred result
Lang Labor	Chris Lang	12,357	55.7	−10.1
Labor	Frank Peffer	9,844	44.3	+10.1
Lang Labor hold		Swing	−10.1	

=== Balmain ===
1947 New South Wales state election: Balmain
Party	Candidate	Votes	%	±%
Labor	Mary Quirk	11,229	55.8	−2.5
Liberal	Eddington Sherwood	3,667	18.2	+4.7
Independent	Ronald Sarina	2,089	10.4	+10.4
Communist	Stanley Moran	1,788	8.9	−19.3
Independent	Malinda Ivey	1,340	6.7	+6.7
Total formal votes		20,113	96.2	−0.5
Informal votes		783	3.8	+0.5
Turnout		20,896	95.6	+2.4
Labor hold		Swing	N/A	

- Preferences were not distributed.

=== Bankstown ===
1947 New South Wales state election: Bankstown
Party	Candidate	Votes	%	±%
Labor	James McGirr	16,858	60.9	+1.9
Liberal	John Byrne	5,783	20.9	+20.9
Lang Labor	Ernest Callaghan	3,300	11.9	−29.1
Independent	George Durrance	1,751	6.3	+6.3
Total formal votes		27,692	98.7	+3.9
Informal votes		375	1.3	−3.9
Turnout		28,067	94.6	+1.9
Labor hold		Swing	N/A	

- Preferences were not distributed.

=== Barwon ===
1947 New South Wales state election: Barwon
Party	Candidate	Votes	%	±%
Labor	Roy Heferen	6,952	49.5	−6.1
Country	Geoff Crawford	5,688	40.5	+40.5
Country	Ernest Ellis	1,402	10.0	+10.0
Total formal votes		14,042	99.3	+1.3
Informal votes		100	0.7	−1.3
Turnout		14,142	93.1	+4.7
Two-party-preferred result
Labor	Roy Heferen	7,042	50.2	−5.4
Country	Geoff Crawford	7,000	49.8	+49.8
Labor hold		Swing	N/A	

=== Bathurst ===
1947 New South Wales state election: Bathurst
Party	Candidate	Votes	%	±%
Labor	Gus Kelly	8,802	59.1	−2.2
Liberal	Walter L'Estrange	6,105	40.9	+40.9
Total formal votes		14,907	98.8	+0.9
Informal votes		184	1.2	−0.9
Turnout		15,091	96.0	+6.3
Labor hold		Swing	−2.2	

=== Blacktown ===
1947 New South Wales state election: Blacktown
Party	Candidate	Votes	%	±%
Labor	John Freeman	13,392	53.8	+2.6
Liberal	Francis Izon	8,939	35.9	+16.8
Lang Labor	Ian Grant	1,387	5.6	−10.9
Communist	Fred Wingrave	1,168	4.7	+4.7
Total formal votes		24,886	98.0	+2.4
Informal votes		518	2.0	−2.4
Turnout		25,404	94.7	+3.8
Labor hold		Swing	N/A	

- Preferences were not distributed.

=== Bondi ===
1947 New South Wales state election: Bondi
Party	Candidate	Votes	%	±%
Labor	Abe Landa	12,148	49.2	+5.6
Liberal	William McNally	10,488	42.4	+12.6
Lang Labor	Elizabeth Frewin	2,080	8.4	−6.4
Total formal votes		24,716	98.2	+3.1
Informal votes		442	1.8	−3.1
Turnout		25,158	93.5	+0.9
Two-party-preferred result
Labor	Abe Landa	13,454	54.4	+3.3
Liberal	William McNally	11,262	45.6	−3.3
Labor hold		Swing	+3.3	

=== Botany ===
1947 New South Wales state election: Botany
Party	Candidate	Votes	%	±%
Labor	Bob Heffron	unopposed		
Labor hold				

=== Bulli ===
1947 New South Wales state election: Bulli
Party	Candidate	Votes	%	±%
Labor	Laurie Kelly	8,517	58.5	+10.1
Independent Labor	Hector MacKay	3,117	21.4	+21.4
Communist	John Martin	2,937	20.2	−10.6
Total formal votes		14,571	97.0	+1.4
Informal votes		449	3.0	−1.4
Turnout		15,020	95.5	+3.0
Labor hold		Swing	N/A	

- Preferences were not distributed.

=== Burwood ===
1947 New South Wales state election: Burwood
Party	Candidate	Votes	%	±%
Liberal	Gordon Jackett	14,216	60.3	+21.7
Labor	George Russell	9,361	39.7	+5.5
Total formal votes		23,577	98.7	+2.2
Informal votes		305	1.3	−2.2
Turnout		23,882	95.2	+1.4
Liberal hold		Swing	+7.9	

=== Byron ===
1947 New South Wales state election: Byron
Party	Candidate	Votes	%	±%
Country	Stanley Stephens	10,485	68.2	+33.4
Independent	Rodger Pendergast	3,502	22.8	+22.8
Independent	Christopher Grant	1,383	9.0	+9.0
Total formal votes		15,370	98.7	+1.0
Informal votes		203	1.3	−1.0
Turnout		15,573	93.0	+3.5
Country hold		Swing	N/A	

- Preferences were not distributed.

=== Canterbury ===
1947 New South Wales state election: Canterbury
Party	Candidate	Votes	%	±%
Labor	Arthur Tonge	13,606	55.5	−16.6
Liberal	John Paget	10,931	44.5	+44.5
Total formal votes		24,537	98.9	+6.8
Informal votes		266	1.1	−6.8
Turnout		24,803	96.2	+2.2
Labor hold		Swing	N/A	

=== Casino ===
1947 New South Wales state election: Casino
Party	Candidate	Votes	%	±%
Country	John Reid	9,132	63.8	+6.7
Labor	Harold Edwards	5,172	36.2	−6.7
Total formal votes		14,304	98.5	+1.2
Informal votes		214	1.5	−1.2
Turnout		14,518	92.7	+4.1
Country hold		Swing	+6.7	

=== Castlereagh ===
1947 New South Wales state election: Castlereagh
Party	Candidate	Votes	%	±%
Labor	Jack Renshaw	6,961	54.9	−6.4
Country	Richard Powell	5,724	45.1	+6.4
Total formal votes		12,685	99.2	+1.3
Informal votes		102	0.8	−1.3
Turnout		12,787	93.8	+7.0
Labor hold		Swing	−6.4	

=== Cessnock ===
1947 New South Wales state election: Cessnock
Party	Candidate	Votes	%	±%
Labor	Jack Baddeley	12,756	60.0	−40.0
Independent Labor	William May	5,323	25.0	+25.0
Communist	Charles Evans	3,200	15.0	+15.0
Total formal votes		21,279	97.7	
Informal votes		510	2.3	
Turnout		21,789	96.3	
Labor hold		Swing	N/A	

- Preferences were not distributed.

=== Clarence ===
1947 New South Wales state election: Clarence
Party	Candidate	Votes	%	±%
Country	Cecil Wingfield	unopposed		
Country hold				

=== Cobar ===
1947 New South Wales state election: Cobar
Party	Candidate	Votes	%	±%
Labor	Mat Davidson	unopposed		
Labor hold				

=== Concord ===
1947 New South Wales state election: Concord
Party	Candidate	Votes	%	±%
Labor	Bill Carlton	12,387	53.6	+9.4
Liberal	Brice Mutton	10,722	46.4	+26.9
Total formal votes		23,109	98.5	+1.3
Informal votes		354	1.5	−1.3
Turnout		23,463	95.9	+3.1
Labor hold		Swing	N/A	

=== Coogee ===
1947 New South Wales state election: Coogee
Party	Candidate	Votes	%	±%
Labor	Lou Cunningham	11,984	51.7	−9.0
Liberal	Kevin Ellis	11,191	48.3	+9.0
Total formal votes		23,175	98.1	+1.5
Informal votes		455	1.9	−1.5
Turnout		23,630	92.8	+2.6
Labor hold		Swing	−9.0	

=== Cook's River ===
1947 New South Wales state election: Cook's River
Party	Candidate	Votes	%	±%
Labor	Joseph Cahill	13,972	65.6	−34.4
Lang Labor	John Hamilton	7,337	34.4	+34.4
Total formal votes		21,309	96.8	
Informal votes		708	3.2	
Turnout		22,017	95.4	
Labor hold		Swing	N/A	

=== Corowa ===
1947 New South Wales state election: Corowa
Party	Candidate	Votes	%	±%
Country	Ebenezer Kendell	7,638	63.7	+29.8
Labor	James Adam	4,352	36.3	+7.0
Total formal votes		11,990	99.1	+1.3
Informal votes		111	0.9	−1.3
Turnout		12,101	93.1	+4.6
Country gain from Independent		Swing	N/A	

Ebenezer Kendell (Country) had won the seat at the 1946 by-election following the resignation of Christopher Lethbridge (Independent).

=== Croydon ===
1947 New South Wales state election: Croydon
Party	Candidate	Votes	%	±%
Liberal	David Hunter	13,838	62.5	+0.5
Labor	Clive Leroy	8,292	37.5	+37.5
Total formal votes		22,130	98.6	+3.5
Informal votes		307	1.4	−3.5
Turnout		22,437	93.9	+3.1
Liberal hold		Swing	N/A	

=== Drummoyne ===
1947 New South Wales state election: Drummoyne
Party	Candidate	Votes	%	±%
Liberal	Robert Dewley	11,255	51.6	+17.0
Labor	Robert Greig	10,561	48.4	+5.4
Total formal votes		21,816	98.5	+1.8
Informal votes		322	1.5	−1.8
Turnout		22,138	95.5	+1.9
Liberal gain from Labor		Swing	+9.8	

=== Dubbo ===
1947 New South Wales state election: Dubbo
Party	Candidate	Votes	%	±%
Labor	Clarrie Robertson	7,215	53.0	−4.5
Country	Thelma Harvey	4,210	30.9	+1.4
Liberal	Clarence Cook	2,186	16.1	+16.1
Total formal votes		13,611	99.1	+0.8
Informal votes		122	0.9	−0.8
Turnout		13,733	94.9	+4.8
Labor hold		Swing	N/A	

- Preferences were not distributed.

=== Dulwich Hill ===
1947 New South Wales state election: Dulwich Hill
Party	Candidate	Votes	%	±%
Labor	George Weir	11,931	54.1	+9.8
Liberal	John Adamson	10,105	45.9	+14.8
Total formal votes		22,036	98.7	+1.7
Informal votes		300	1.3	−1.7
Turnout		22,336	94.9	+2.1
Labor hold		Swing	−2.3	

=== Georges River ===
1947 New South Wales state election: Georges River
Party	Candidate	Votes	%	±%
Labor	Arthur Williams	15,645	52.4	−9.6
Liberal	Ray Watson	14,236	47.6	+9.6
Total formal votes		29,881	98.6	+2.1
Informal votes		438	1.4	−2.1
Turnout		30,319	95.2	+3.0
Labor hold		Swing	−9.6	

=== Gloucester ===
1947 New South Wales state election: Gloucester
Party	Candidate	Votes	%	±%
Independent	Ray Fitzgerald	5,650	41.4	+0.4
Country	Donald Mackay	4,194	30.7	+9.7
Liberal	Alan Borthwick	3,066	22.5	−15.4
Independent	James Bogan	366	2.7	+2.7
Independent	Edwin Dark	366	2.7	+2.7
Total formal votes		13,642	97.2	−1.0
Informal votes		396	2.8	+1.0
Turnout		14,038	94.8	+2.2
Two-candidate-preferred result
Independent	Ray Fitzgerald	6,885	50.5	+0.3
Country	Donald Mackay	6,757	49.5	+49.5
Independent hold		Swing	+0.3	

=== Gordon ===
1947 New South Wales state election: Gordon
Party	Candidate	Votes	%	±%
Liberal	Harry Turner	19,241	84.3	+12.7
Independent	James O'Toole	3,572	15.7	+15.7
Total formal votes		22,813	98.5	+1.5
Informal votes		344	1.5	−1.5
Turnout		23,157	92.6	−0.2
Liberal hold		Swing	N/A	

=== Goulburn ===
1947 New South Wales state election: Goulburn
Party	Candidate	Votes	%	±%
Labor	Laurie Tully	8,019	52.6	−47.4
Liberal	Ray Bladwell	7,240	47.4	+47.4
Total formal votes		15,259	99.3	
Informal votes		112	0.7	
Turnout		15,371	96.8	
Labor hold		Swing	N/A	

=== Granville ===
1947 New South Wales state election: Granville
Party	Candidate	Votes	%	±%
Labor	Bill Lamb	17,505	74.5	+0.7
Lang Labor	Frederick Cruse	5,998	25.5	−0.7
Total formal votes		23,503	94.1	−0.9
Informal votes		1,478	5.9	+0.9
Turnout		24,981	94.8	+1.6
Labor hold		Swing	+0.7	

=== Hamilton ===
1947 New South Wales state election: Hamilton
Party	Candidate	Votes	%	±%
Labor	Joshua Arthur	13,830	57.6	−19.2
Liberal	Oscar Newton	6,776	28.2	+28.2
Independent	Harold Scott-Daisley	1,901	7.9	+7.9
Lang Labor	William Lambert	1,512	6.3	−16.9
Total formal votes		24,019	98.7	+3.2
Informal votes		322	1.3	−3.2
Turnout		24,341	95.4	+3.3
Labor hold		Swing	N/A	

=== Hartley ===
1947 New South Wales state election: Hartley
Party	Candidate	Votes	%	±%
Labor	Hamilton Knight	12,551	84.7	−15.3
Communist	John King	2,263	15.3	+15.3
Total formal votes		14,814	94.9	
Informal votes		800	5.1	
Turnout		15,614	94.7	
Labor hold		Swing	N/A	

=== Hawkesbury ===
1947 New South Wales state election: Hawkesbury
Party	Candidate	Votes	%	±%
Labor	Frank Finnan	10,034	52.0	−6.7
Liberal	Bernie Deane	7,562	39.1	+16.1
Country	Edward Mann	1,717	8.9	−9.4
Total formal votes		19,313	98.6	+0.2
Informal votes		279	1.4	−0.2
Turnout		19,592	95.6	+4.7
Labor hold		Swing	N/A	

- Preferences were not distributed.

=== Hornsby ===
1947 New South Wales state election: Hornsby
Party	Candidate	Votes	%	±%
Liberal	Jeffrey Blaxland	9,203	37.2	−2.3
Liberal	Sydney Storey	7,649	30.9	+30.9
Labor	George Manuel	6,491	26.2	+26.2
Independent	Charles Somerville	1,401	5.7	+5.7
Total formal votes		24,744	97.3	+1.1
Informal votes		693	2.7	−1.1
Turnout		25,437	94.1	+4.8
Two-candidate-preferred result
Liberal	Sydney Storey	13,385	54.1	
Liberal	Jeffrey Blaxland	11,359	45.9	
Member changed to Liberal from Independent		Swing	N/A	

=== Hurstville ===
1947 New South Wales state election: Hurstville
Party	Candidate	Votes	%	±%
Labor	Clive Evatt	15,069	57.1	−9.5
Liberal	Leslie Webster	11,310	42.9	+9.5
Total formal votes		26,379	98.7	+2.1
Informal votes		350	1.3	−2.1
Turnout		26,729	96.3	+1.6
Labor hold		Swing	−9.5	

=== Illawarra ===
1947 New South Wales state election: Illawarra
Party	Candidate	Votes	%	±%
Labor	Howard Fowles	8,918	59.7	−1.7
Liberal	Neville Carey	4,031	27.0	+9.2
Country	Arthur Butfield	1,994	13.3	−2.9
Total formal votes		14,943	98.6	+0.9
Informal votes		208	1.4	−0.9
Turnout		15,151	94.8	+3.3
Labor hold		Swing	N/A	

- Preferences were not distributed.

=== King ===
1947 New South Wales state election: King
Party	Candidate	Votes	%	±%
Labor	Daniel Clyne	9,104	44.8	−9.3
Liberal	Roberta Galagher	4,859	23.9	+23.9
Lang Labor	Horace Foley	4,759	23.4	−22.5
Communist	Frederick Haimes	1,602	7.9	+7.9
Total formal votes		20,324	95.8	+2.2
Informal votes		886	4.2	−2.2
Turnout		21,210	91.0	+6.1
After distribution of preferences
Labor	Daniel Clyne	10,305	50.7	
Liberal	Roberta Gallagher	5,071	24.9	
Lang Labor	Horace Foley	4,948	24.4	
Labor hold		Swing	N/A	

- Preferences were not distributed to completion.

=== Kogarah ===
1947 New South Wales state election: Kogarah
Party	Candidate	Votes	%	±%
Labor	William Currey	14,445	57.4	−3.3
Liberal	George Evans	10,713	42.6	+13.6
Total formal votes		25,158	98.5	+1.5
Informal votes		390	1.5	−1.5
Turnout		25,548	95.1	+2.1
Labor hold		Swing	N/A	

=== Kurri Kurri ===
1947 New South Wales state election: Kurri Kurri
Party	Candidate	Votes	%	±%
Labor	George Booth	22,420	85.9	−14.1
Communist	Robert Chapman	3,688	14.1	+14.1
Total formal votes		26,108	97.1	
Informal votes		774	2.9	
Turnout		26,882	96.5	
Labor hold		Swing	N/A	

=== Lachlan ===
1947 New South Wales state election: Lachlan
Party	Candidate	Votes	%	±%
Labor	John Chanter	4,995	45.8	−27.2
Country	Robert Medcalf	3,981	36.5	+36.5
Liberal	Daniel Clifton	1,755	16.1	+16.1
Independent	Madge Roberts	187	1.7	+1.7
Total formal votes		10,918	98.4	+4.9
Informal votes		173	1.6	−4.9
Turnout		11,091	92.2	+3.0
Two-party-preferred result
Country	Robert Medcalf	5,609	51.4	+51.4
Labor	John Chanter	5,309	48.6	−24.4
Country gain from Labor		Swing	N/A	

=== Lakemba ===
1947 New South Wales state election: Lakemba
Party	Candidate	Votes	%	±%
Labor	Fred Stanley	14,376	55.3	+13.2
Independent	William Dowe	5,711	22.0	+22.0
Independent	Harry Robson	3,919	15.1	+15.1
Communist	Adam Ogston	1,974	7.6	−9.8
Total formal votes		25,980	97.9	+0.6
Informal votes		546	2.1	−0.6
Turnout		26,526	95.3	+1.8
Labor hold		Swing	N/A	

- Preferences were not distributed.

=== Lane Cove ===
1947 New South Wales state election: Lane Cove
Party	Candidate	Votes	%	±%
Liberal	Ken McCaw	12,865	53.1	+26.8
Labor	Henry Woodward	10,289	42.5	−1.9
Communist	Leslie Greenfield	1,083	4.5	+4.5
Total formal votes		24,237	98.7	+1.5
Informal votes		316	1.3	−1.5
Turnout		24,553	95.9	+2.6
Liberal gain from Labor		Swing	N/A	

- Preferences were not distributed.

=== Leichhardt ===
1947 New South Wales state election: Leichhardt
Party	Candidate	Votes	%	±%
Labor	Claude Matthews	unopposed		
Labor hold				

=== Lismore ===
1947 New South Wales state election: Lismore
Party	Candidate	Votes	%	±%
Country	William Frith	9,628	62.9	+3.4
Independent	Frederick Stoker	5,686	37.1	+37.1
Total formal votes		15,314	98.5	+0.2
Informal votes		227	1.5	−0.2
Turnout		15,541	93.6	+4.3
Country hold		Swing	N/A	

=== Liverpool Plains ===
1947 New South Wales state election: Liverpool Plains
Party	Candidate	Votes	%	±%
Labor	Roger Nott	6,894	54.9	−3.8
Country	Cleve Slacksmith	5,662	45.1	+3.8
Total formal votes		12,556	98.9	+0.4
Informal votes		133	1.1	−0.4
Turnout		12,689	95.3	+5.4
Labor hold		Swing	−3.8	

=== Maitland ===
1947 New South Wales state election: Maitland
Party	Candidate	Votes	%	±%
Liberal	Walter Howarth	9,245	60.8	+5.9
Labor	Walter O'Hearn	5,963	39.2	−5.9
Total formal votes		15,208	99.0	+0.5
Informal votes		154	1.0	−0.5
Turnout		15,362	97.1	+3.7
Liberal hold		Swing	+5.9	

=== Manly ===
1947 New South Wales state election: Manly
Party	Candidate	Votes	%	±%
Liberal	Douglas Darby	17,345	63.2	+40.0
Labor	Cedric Cahill	10,101	36.8	+0.2
Total formal votes		27,446	98.9	+1.8
Informal votes		300	1.1	−1.8
Turnout		27,746	95.2	+4.2
Liberal hold		Swing	+6.0	

=== Marrickville ===
1947 New South Wales state election: Marrickville
Party	Candidate	Votes	%	±%
Labor	Carlo Lazzarini	15,744	71.4	−28.6
Independent	William McCristal	6,322	28.6	+28.6
Total formal votes		22,066	95.0	
Informal votes		1,159	5.0	
Turnout		23,225	95.0	
Labor hold		Swing	N/A	

=== Monaro ===
1947 New South Wales state election: Monaro
Party	Candidate	Votes	%	±%
Labor	John Seiffert	8,723	67.0	
Liberal	William Bruce	4,302	33.0	
Total formal votes		13,025	98.2	
Informal votes		241	1.8	
Turnout		13,266	94.9	
Labor hold		Swing	N/A	

=== Mosman ===
1947 New South Wales state election: Mosman
Party	Candidate	Votes	%	±%
Liberal	Pat Morton	12,773	55.6	+30.9
Independent	Donald Macdonald	10,218	44.4	−17.8
Total formal votes		22,991	98.8	+1.6
Informal votes		288	1.2	−1.6
Turnout		23,279	94.7	+3.4
Liberal gain from Independent		Swing	N/A	

=== Mudgee ===
1947 New South Wales state election: Mudgee
Party	Candidate	Votes	%	±%
Labor	Bill Dunn	6,487	55.0	−8.0
Country	Frederick Cooke	5,298	45.0	+45.0
Total formal votes		11,785	99.2	+1.1
Informal votes		96	0.8	−1.1
Turnout		11,881	95.5	+4.2
Labor hold		Swing	N/A	

=== Murray ===
1947 New South Wales state election: Murray
Party	Candidate	Votes	%	±%
Country	Joe Lawson	6,763	61.7	+4.6
Labor	James Flood	4,198	38.3	−4.6
Total formal votes		10,961	99.4	+1.3
Informal votes		65	0.6	−1.3
Turnout		11,026	89.5	+0.6
Country hold		Swing	+4.6	

=== Murrumbidgee ===
1947 New South Wales state election: Murrumbidgee
Party	Candidate	Votes	%	±%
Labor	George Enticknap	8,201	55.9	−11.1
Country	John Thorne	6,466	44.1	+11.1
Total formal votes		14,667	98.5	+1.4
Informal votes		227	1.5	−1.4
Turnout		14,894	94.3	+4.8
Labor hold		Swing	−11.1	

=== Namoi ===
1947 New South Wales state election: Namoi
Party	Candidate	Votes	%	±%
Labor	Raymond Hamilton	6,634	51.2	−8.4
Country	Malcolm Heath	6,313	48.8	+8.4
Total formal votes		12,947	99.1	+0.7
Informal votes		111	0.9	−0.7
Turnout		13,058	95.0	+7.4
Labor hold		Swing	−8.4	

=== Nepean ===
1947 New South Wales state election: Nepean
Party	Candidate	Votes	%	±%
Liberal	Joseph Jackson	9,989	56.6	+20.2
Labor	Earle Cameron	7,644	43.4	+2.0
Total formal votes		17,633	98.2	+0.7
Informal votes		324	1.8	−0.7
Turnout		17,957	94.0	+4.5
Member changed to Liberal from Independent Democrat		Swing	+1.6	

=== Neutral Bay ===
1947 New South Wales state election: Neutral Bay
Party	Candidate	Votes	%	±%
Liberal	Ivan Black	17,349	72.2	+15.3
Independent	Jack Prior	6,670	27.8	+27.8
Total formal votes		24,019	98.6	+1.0
Informal votes		348	1.4	−1.0
Turnout		24,367	93.8	+3.3
Liberal hold		Swing	N/A	

=== Newcastle ===
1947 New South Wales state election: Newcastle
Party	Candidate	Votes	%	±%
Labor	Frank Hawkins	15,809	65.8	−15.7
Liberal	Trebor Edmunds	8,221	34.2	+34.2
Total formal votes		24,030	98.6	+3.7
Informal votes		335	1.4	−3.7
Turnout		24,365	95.0	+3.5
Labor hold		Swing	N/A	

=== Newtown ===
1947 New South Wales state election: Newtown
Party	Candidate	Votes	%	±%
Lang Labor	Lilian Fowler	9,446	47.0	−8.6
Labor	Arthur Greenup	9,264	46.1	+1.7
Communist	Freda Brown	1,367	6.8	+6.8
Total formal votes		20,077	97.6	+1.6
Informal votes		486	2.4	−1.6
Turnout		20,563	94.9	+3.2
Two-candidate-preferred result
Lang Labor	Lilian Fowler	10,135	50.5	−5.1
Labor	Arthur Greenup	9,942	49.5	+5.1
Lang Labor hold		Swing	−5.1	

=== North Sydney ===
1947 New South Wales state election: North Sydney
Party	Candidate	Votes	%	±%
Labor	James Geraghty	11,867	49.3	+3.6
Liberal	William Travers	11,105	46.1	+11.9
Communist	Bill Wood	1,100	4.6	+4.6
Total formal votes		24,072	98.6	+2.1
Informal votes		332	1.4	−2.1
Turnout		24,404	94.7	+0.1
Two-party-preferred result
Labor	James Geraghty	12,717	52.8	−4.5
Liberal	William Travers	11,355	47.2	+4.5
Labor hold		Swing	−4.5	

=== Orange ===
1947 New South Wales state election: Orange
Party	Candidate	Votes	%	±%
Labor	Bob O'Halloran	6,530	42.3	−8.9
Country	Charles Cutler	5,678	36.8	−12.0
Liberal	Thomas Whiteley	3,229	20.9	+20.9
Total formal votes		15,437	98.7	+1.2
Informal votes		197	1.3	−1.2
Turnout		15,634	95.5	+4.4
Two-party-preferred result
Country	Charles Cutler	8,307	53.8	+5.0
Labor	Bob O'Halloran	7,130	46.2	−5.0
Country gain from Labor		Swing	+5.0	

=== Oxley ===
1947 New South Wales state election: Oxley
Party	Candidate	Votes	%	±%
Country	Les Jordan	unopposed		
Member changed to Country from Independent Country				

=== Paddington ===
1947 New South Wales state election: Paddington
Party	Candidate	Votes	%	±%
Labor	Maurice O'Sullivan	12,755	68.1	−31.9
Lang Labor	Owen Cahill	2,972	15.9	+15.9
Protestant Labour	Jonno Hodgson	1,634	8.7	+8.7
Communist	Phyllis Johnson	1,357	7.3	+7.3
Total formal votes		18,718	96.2	
Informal votes		739	3.8	
Turnout		19,457	93.3	
Labor hold		Swing	N/A	

- Preferences were not distributed.

=== Parramatta ===
1947 New South Wales state election: Parramatta
Party	Candidate	Votes	%	±%
Liberal	George Gollan	13,263	53.8	+6.2
Labor	William Browne	7,385	30.0	−15.5
Independent	Charles Brown	3,996	16.2	+16.2
Total formal votes		24,644	98.5	+1.0
Informal votes		382	1.5	−1.0
Turnout		25,026	95.0	+2.5
Liberal hold		Swing	N/A	

- Preferences were not distributed.

=== Phillip ===
1947 New South Wales state election: Phillip
Party	Candidate	Votes	%	±%
Labor	Tom Shannon	12,040	62.2	+2.9
Lang Labor	Michael Moore	3,586	18.5	−22.2
Independent	Henry Dixon	2,161	11.2	+11.2
Communist	Thomas Payne	1,580	8.2	+8.2
Total formal votes		19,367	95.5	+0.9
Informal votes		902	4.5	−0.9
Turnout		20,269	91.9	+3.3
Labor hold		Swing	N/A	

- Preferences were not distributed.

=== Raleigh ===
1947 New South Wales state election: Raleigh
Party	Candidate	Votes	%	±%
Country	Roy Vincent	11,479	67.7	+5.6
Independent Labor	Millicent Christian	5,477	32.3	+32.3
Total formal votes		16,956	98.8	+0.8
Informal votes		198	1.2	−0.8
Turnout		17,154	95.0	+0.9
Country hold		Swing	N/A	

=== Randwick ===
1947 New South Wales state election: Randwick
Party	Candidate	Votes	%	±%
Labor	William Gollan	13,014	57.2	−1.8
Liberal	Thomas Murphy	9,757	42.8	+14.4
Total formal votes		22,771	98.1	+1.9
Informal votes		440	1.9	−1.9
Turnout		23,211	93.8	+0.7
Labor hold		Swing	N/A	

=== Redfern ===
1947 New South Wales state election: Redfern
Party	Candidate	Votes	%	±%
Labor	George Noble	13,015	65.7	+4.8
Lang Labor	Edward Waters	3,785	19.1	−20.0
Protestant Labour	Frederick Fairbrother	1,727	8.7	+8.7
Communist	Jack Miles	1,281	6.5	+6.5
Total formal votes		19,808	95.9	−0.5
Informal votes		856	4.1	+0.5
Turnout		20,664	94.2	+2.3
Labor hold		Swing	N/A	

- Preferences were not distributed.

=== Rockdale ===
1947 New South Wales state election: Rockdale
Party	Candidate	Votes	%	±%
Labor	John McGrath	12,305	54.8	−1.3
Liberal	George McGuire	10,146	45.2	+13.1
Total formal votes		22,451	98.3	−0.6
Informal votes		396	1.7	+0.6
Turnout		22,847	95.4	+1.7
Labor hold		Swing	N/A	

=== Ryde ===
1947 New South Wales state election: Ryde
Party	Candidate	Votes	%	±%
Liberal	Eric Hearnshaw	15,670	62.9	+43.9
Independent	Robert O'Neile	9,238	37.1	+37.1
Total formal votes		24,908	98.1	+2.0
Informal votes		494	1.9	−2.0
Turnout		25,402	94.3	+1.9
Liberal hold		Swing	N/A	

=== South Coast ===
1947 New South Wales state election: South Coast
Party	Candidate	Votes	%	±%
Independent	Jack Beale	8,682	61.9	+6.1
Liberal	Richard Bush	5,354	38.1	−23.1
Total formal votes		14,036	99.0	+0.7
Informal votes		141	1.0	−0.7
Turnout		14,177	95.8	+5.5
Independent hold		Swing	N/A	

=== Sturt ===
1947 New South Wales state election: Sturt
Party	Candidate	Votes	%	±%
Labor	William Wattison	unopposed		
Labor hold				

=== Tamworth ===
1947 New South Wales state election: Tamworth
Party	Candidate	Votes	%	±%
Country	Bill Chaffey	6,004	56.8	+56.8
Labor	Cyril Cahill	6,076	43.2	+43.2
Total formal votes		14,080	98.9	
Informal votes		158	1.1	
Turnout		14,238	95.7	
Member changed to Country from Independent		Swing	N/A	

=== Temora ===
1947 New South Wales state election: Temora
Party	Candidate	Votes	%	±%
Country	Doug Dickson	8,538	63.6	+11.5
Labor	Percy Lucas	4,876	36.4	−8.9
Total formal votes		13,414	98.8	+0.9
Informal votes		157	1.2	−0.9
Turnout		13,571	95.1	+4.4
Country hold		Swing	N/A	

=== Tenterfield ===
1947 New South Wales state election: Tenterfield
Party	Candidate	Votes	%	±%
Country	Michael Bruxner	unopposed		
Country hold				

=== Upper Hunter ===
1947 New South Wales state election: Upper Hunter
Party	Candidate	Votes	%	±%
Country	D'Arcy Rose	9,341	63.5	+5.9
Labor	John Speers	5,377	36.5	−5.9
Total formal votes		14,718	98.9	+0.9
Informal votes		165	1.1	−0.9
Turnout		14,883	94.7	+3.7
Country hold		Swing	+5.9	

=== Vaucluse ===
1947 New South Wales state election: Vaucluse
Party	Candidate	Votes	%	±%
Liberal	Murray Robson	16,097	67.4	−32.6
Independent Liberal	Frank Browne	7,789	32.6	+32.6
Total formal votes		23,886	95.4	
Informal votes		1,161	4.6	
Turnout		25,047	93.0	
Liberal hold		Swing	N/A	

=== Wagga Wagga ===
1947 New South Wales state election: Wagga Wagga
Party	Candidate	Votes	%	±%
Labor	Eddie Graham	9,408	64.7	−3.3
Country	Ernest Wenke	5,141	35.3	+3.3
Total formal votes		14,549	99.0	+0.3
Informal votes		153	1.0	−0.3
Turnout		14,702	94.8	+4.9
Labor hold		Swing	−3.3	

=== Waratah ===
1947 New South Wales state election: Waratah
Party	Candidate	Votes	%	±%
Labor	Robert Cameron	21,551	87.9	+22.1
Independent	Stan Deacon	2,960	12.1	+12.1
Total formal votes		24,511	94.7	−2.7
Informal votes		1,373	5.3	+2.7
Turnout		25,884	95.5	+2.6
Labor hold		Swing	N/A	

=== Waverley ===
1947 New South Wales state election: Waverley
Party	Candidate	Votes	%	±%
Labor	Clarrie Martin	13,481	62.5	−37.5
Liberal	Thomas Fairbairn	8,095	37.5	+37.5
Total formal votes		21,576	98.7	
Informal votes		288	1.3	
Turnout		21,864	92.3	
Labor hold		Swing	N/A	

=== Willoughby ===
1947 New South Wales state election: Willoughby
Party	Candidate	Votes	%	±%
Liberal	George Brain	14,615	63.3	+16.3
Labor	John McHugh	8,459	36.7	−3.3
Total formal votes		23,074	98.7	+1.0
Informal votes		301	1.3	−1.0
Turnout		23,375	96.0	+2.0
Liberal hold		Swing	+7.1	

=== Wollondilly ===
1947 New South Wales state election: Wollondilly
Party	Candidate	Votes	%	±%
Liberal	Jeff Bate	9,919	66.4	+0.9
Labor	James Walsh	5,013	33.6	+33.6
Total formal votes		14,932	98.8	+1.9
Informal votes		184	1.2	−1.9
Turnout		15,116	94.5	+6.1
Liberal hold		Swing	N/A	

=== Wollongong-Kembla ===
1947 New South Wales state election: Wollongong-Kembla
Party	Candidate	Votes	%	±%
Labor	Billy Davies	unopposed		
Labor hold				

=== Woollahra ===
1947 New South Wales state election: Woollahra
Party	Candidate	Votes	%	±%
Liberal	Vernon Treatt	19,332	69.7	+19.2
Labor	John Nolan	8,385	30.3	+30.3
Total formal votes		27,717	98.2	+1.5
Informal votes		508	1.8	−1.5
Turnout		28,225	90.1	+0.3
Liberal hold		Swing	N/A	

=== Yass ===
1947 New South Wales state election: Yass
Party	Candidate	Votes	%	±%
Labor	Bill Sheahan	8,393	60.4	−39.6
Country	John MacKay	3,957	28.5	+28.5
Liberal	Noel Barber	1,384	10.0	+10.0
Independent	John Cusack	163	1.2	+1.2
Total formal votes		13,897	99.0	
Informal votes		137	1.0	
Turnout		14,043	95.5	
Labor hold		Swing	N/A	

- Preferences were not distributed.

=== Young ===
1947 New South Wales state election: Young
Party	Candidate	Votes	%	±%
Labor	Fred Cahill	7,648	52.7	−5.4
Liberal	Percy Richardson	3,936	27.1	+27.1
Country	John Collins	2,937	20.2	
Total formal votes		14,521	99.3	+0.9
Informal votes		103	0.7	−0.9
Turnout		14,624	96.1	+5.1
Labor hold		Swing	N/A	

== See also ==
- Candidates of the 1947 New South Wales state election
- Members of the New South Wales Legislative Assembly, 1947–1950
