= Candidates of the 1947 New South Wales state election =

This is a list of candidates of the 1947 New South Wales state election. The election was held on 3 May 1947.

== Retiring Members ==
William McKell (Labor, Redfern) resigned in February 1947; no by-election was held due to the proximity of the election.

=== Labor ===
- Ted Horsington (Sturt)
- John Sweeney (Bulli)

== Legislative Assembly ==
Sitting members are shown in bold text. Successful candidates are highlighted in the relevant colour.

Electorate	Held by	Labor candidate	Coalition candidate	Other candidates
Albury	Labor	**John Hurley**	Doug Padman (Lib-CP)	
Annandale	Labor	**Bob Gorman**		George Stanley (LL)
Armidale	Country	Francis Harvison	**David Drummond** (CP)	
Ashburnham	Labor	**Edgar Dring**	Holman Cockram (Lib); Hilton Elliott (CP)	
Ashfield	Liberal	William Peters	**Athol Richardson** (Lib)	
Auburn	Lang Labor	Frank Peffer		**Chris Lang** (LL)
Auburn	Lang Labor	Frank Peffer		Alexander Kerr (Ind); Stanley Roy (CPA)
Balmain	Labor	**Mary Quirk**	Eddington Sherwood (Lib)	Malinda Ivey (Ind); Stan Moran (CPA); Ronald Sarina (Ind)
Bankstown	Labor	**James McGirr**	John Byrne (Lib)	Ernest Callaghan (LL); George Durrance (Ind)
Barwon	Labor	**Roy Heferen**	Geoff Crawford (CP); Ernest Ellis (CP)	
Bathurst	Labor	**Gus Kelly**	Walter L'Estrange (Lib)	
Blacktown	Labor	**John Freeman**	Francis Izon (Lib)	Ian Grant (LL); Frederick Wingrave (CPA)
Bondi	Labor	**Abe Landa**	William McNally (Lib)	Bessie Frewin (LL)
Botany	Labor	**Bob Heffron**		
Bulli	Labor	Laurie Kelly		Hector MacKay (Ind Lab); John Martin (CPA)
Burwood	Liberal	George Russell	**Gordon Jackett** (Lib)	
Byron	Country		**Stanley Stephens** (CP)	Christopher Grant (Ind)
Canterbury	Labor	**Arthur Tonge**	John Paget (Lib)	
Casino	Country	Harold Edwards	**John Reid** (CP)	
Castlereagh	Labor	**Jack Renshaw**	Richard Powell (CP)	
Cessnock	Labor	**Jack Baddeley**		Charles Evans (CPA); William May (Ind Lab)
Clarence	Country		**Cecil Wingfield** (CP)	
Cobar	Labor	**Mat Davidson**		
Concord	Labor	**Bill Carlton**	Brice Mutton (Lib)	
Coogee	Labor	**Lou Cunningham**	Kevin Ellis (Lib)	
Cook's River	Labor	**Joseph Cahill**		John Hamilton (LL)
Corowa	Country	James Adam	**Ebenezer Kendell** (CP)	
Croydon	Liberal	Clive Leroy	**David Hunter** (Lib)	
Drummoyne	Labor	**Robert Greig**	Robert Dewley (Lib)	
Dubbo	Labor	**Clarrie Robertson**	Clarence Cook (Lib); Thelma Harvey (CP)	
Dulwich Hill	Labor	**George Weir**	John Adamson (Lib)	
Georges River	Labor	**Arthur Williams**	Ray Watson (Lib)	
Gloucester	Independent		Alan Borthwick (Lib); Donald Mackay (CP)	**Ray Fitzgerald** (Ind)
Gloucester	Independent		Alan Borthwick (Lib); Donald Mackay (CP)	James Bogan (Ind); Edwin Dark (Ind)
Gordon	Liberal		**Harry Turner** (Lib)	James O'Toole (Ind)
Goulburn	Labor	**Laurie Tully**	William Bladwell (Lib-CP)	
Granville	Labor	**Bill Lamb**		Frederick Cruse (LL)
Hamilton	Labor	**Joshua Arthur**	Oscar Newton (Lib)	William Lambert (LL); Harold Scott-Daisley (Ind)
Hartley	Labor	**Hamilton Knight**		John King (CPA)
Hawkesbury	Labor	**Frank Finnan**	Bernie Deane (Lib); Edward Mann (CP)	
Hornsby	Independent	George Manuel	**Sydney Storey** (Lib)	Charles Somerville (Ind)
Hornsby	Independent	George Manuel	Jeffrey Blaxland (Lib)	Charles Somerville (Ind)
Hurstville	Labor	**Clive Evatt**	Leslie Webster (Lib)	
Illawarra	Labor	**Howard Fowles**	Arthur Butfield (CP); Neville Carey (Lib)	
King	Labor	**Daniel Clyne**	Roberta Galagher (Lib)	Horace Foley (LL); Frederick Haimes (CPA)
Kogarah	Labor	**William Currey**	George Evans (Lib)	
Kurri Kurri	Labor	**George Booth**		Robert Chapman (CPA)
Lachlan	Labor	**John Chanter**	Robert Medcalf (CP)	Madge Roberts (Ind)
Lachlan	Labor	**John Chanter**	Daniel Clifton (Lib)	Madge Roberts (Ind)
Lakemba	Labor	**Fred Stanley**		William Dowe (Ind); Adam Ogston (CPA); Harry Robson (Ind)
Lane Cove	Labor	**Henry Woodward**	Ken McCaw (Lib)	Leslie Greenfield (CPA)
Leichhardt	Labor	**Claude Matthews**		
Lismore	Country		**William Frith** (CP)	Frederick Stoker (Ind)
Liverpool Plains	Labor	**Roger Nott**	Cleve Slacksmith (CP)	
Maitland	Liberal	Walter O'Hearn	**Walter Howarth** (Lib)	
Manly	Liberal	Cedric Cahill	**Douglas Darby** (Lib)	
Marrickville	Labor	**Carlo Lazzarini**		William McCristal (Ind)
Monaro	Labor	**John Seiffert**	William Bruce (Lib)	
Mosman	Independent		Pat Morton (Lib)	**Donald Macdonald** (Ind)
Mudgee	Labor	**Bill Dunn**	Frederick Cooke (CP)	
Murray	Country	James Flood	**Joe Lawson** (CP)	
Murrumbidgee	Labor	**George Enticknap**	John Thorne (CP)	
Namoi	Labor	**Raymond Hamilton**	Malcolm Heath (CP)	
Nepean	Independent	Earle Cameron	**Joseph Jackson** (Lib)	
Neutral Bay	Liberal		**Ivan Black** (Lib)	Jack Prior (Ind)
Newcastle	Labor	**Frank Hawkins**	Trebor Edmunds (Lib)	
Newtown	Lang Labor	Arthur Greenup		**Lilian Fowler** (LL)
Newtown	Lang Labor	Arthur Greenup		Freda Brown (CPA)
North Sydney	Labor	**James Geraghty**	William Travers (Lib)	Bill Wood (CPA)
Orange	Labor	**Bob O'Halloran**	Charles Cutler (CP); Thomas Whiteley (Lib)	
Oxley	Independent		**Les Jordan** (CP)	
Paddington	Labor	**Maurice O'Sullivan**		Owen Cahill (LL); Jonno Hodgson (PLP); Phyllis Johnson (CPA)
Parramatta	Liberal	William Browne	**George Gollan** (Lib)	Charles Brown (Ind)
Phillip	Labor	**Tom Shannon**		Henry Dixon (Ind); Michael Moore (LL); Thomas Payne (CPA)
Raleigh	Country		**Roy Vincent** (CP)	Millicent Christian (Ind Lab)
Randwick	Labor	**William Gollan**	Thomas Murphy (Lib)	
Redfern	Labor	George Noble		Frederick Fairbrother (PLP); Jack Miles (CPA); Edward Waters (LL)
Rockdale	Labor	**John McGrath**	George McGuire (Lib)	
Ryde	Liberal		**Eric Hearnshaw** (Lib)	Robert O'Neile (Ind)
South Coast	Independent		Richard Bush (Lib)	**Jack Beale** (Ind)
Sturt	Labor	William Wattison		
Tamworth	Independent	Cyril Cahill	**Bill Chaffey** (CP)	
Temora	Country	Percy Lucas	**Doug Dickson** (CP)	
Tenterfield	Country		**Michael Bruxner** (CP)	
Upper Hunter	Country	John Speers	**D'Arcy Rose** (CP)	
Vaucluse	Liberal		**Murray Robson**	Frank Browne (Ind Lib)
Wagga Wagga	Labor	**Eddie Graham**	Ernest Wenke (CP)	
Waratah	Labor	**Robert Cameron**		Stan Deacon (Ind)
Waverley	Labor	**Clarrie Martin**	Thomas Fairbairn (Lib)	
Willoughby	Liberal	John McHugh	**George Brain** (Lib)	
Wollondilly	Liberal	James Walsh	**Jeff Bate** (Lib)	
Wollongong-Kembla	Labor	**Billy Davies**		
Woollahra	Liberal	John Neale	**Vernon Treatt** (Lib)	
Yass	Labor	**Bill Sheahan**	Noel Barber (Lib); John MacKay (CP)	John Cusack (Ind)
Young	Labor	**Fred Cahill**	John Collins (CP); Percy Richardson (Lib)	

== See also ==
- Members of the New South Wales Legislative Assembly, 1947–1950
