= 1950 Concord state by-election =

Election result for Concord, New South Wales, Australia

A by-election was held for the New South Wales Legislative Assembly electorate of Concord on 11 February 1950 because of the death of Brice Mutton (Liberal).

The by-elections for Armidale and Wollongong-Kembla were held on the same day.

== Dates ==
Date	Event
7 December 1949	Brice Mutton died.
17 January 1950	Writ of election issued by the Speaker of the Legislative Assembly and close of electoral rolls.
23 January 1950	Nominations
11 February 1950	Polling day, between the hours of 8 am and 8 pm
18 March 1950	Return of writ

== Result ==
1950 Concord by-election Saturday 11 February
Party	Candidate	Votes	%	±%
Liberal	John Adamson	11,495	51.1	+1.1
Labor	Hector McDonald	11,020	48.9	−1.1
Total formal votes		22,515	98.9	+0.8
Informal votes		258	1.1	−0.8
Turnout		22,773	89.2	−1.5
Liberal hold		Swing	+1.1	

== See also ==
- Electoral results for the district of Concord
- List of New South Wales state by-elections
