= Stan Lloyd (politician) =

Australian politician

- Lloyd in 1937

Alderman of the Municipality of Enfield
- In office 1928–1938

Mayor of the Municipality of Enfield
- In office 1930–1935

Member of the New South Wales Legislative Assembly for Concord
- In office 1932–1941

Personal details
- Born: 8 December 1889
- Died: 28 April 1967 (aged 77)
- Party: United Australia (after 1931)
- Other political affiliations: Australian Party (1929–1931)

Stanley Allan Lloyd JP (8 December 1889 – 28 April 1967) was an Australian politician.

He was born at St Leonards in Sydney to salesman William Lloyd and Sarah Eliza, née Beard. After attending Fort Street School, he became an accountant. On 29 August 1914 he married Florence Fryer, with whom he had three children. An alderman of Enfield Municipal Council from 1928 to 1938, he served as mayor from 1930 to 1935. In 1932 he was elected to the New South Wales Legislative Assembly as the United Australia Party member for Concord. During his time in the Assembly he became known as an opponent of Premier and party leader Bertram Stevens, and he was involved in Stevens' overthrow in 1939. Lloyd also served as the first chairman of Sydney County Council Electricity Undertaking from 1935 to 1936. He was defeated in 1941. Lloyd died in Sydney in 1967.

Civic offices
Preceded by Ebenezer Ford	Mayor of Enfield; 1929–1935	Succeeded by Reuben Jenner
New South Wales Legislative Assembly
Preceded by Henry McDicken	Member for Concord; 1932–1941	Succeeded by Bill Carlton
Government offices
New title	Chairman of the Sydney County Council; 1935 – 1937	Succeeded by Arthur McElhone
