= 1949 Concord state by-election =

Election result for Concord, New South Wales, Australia

A by-election was held for the New South Wales Legislative Assembly electorate of Concord on 12 March 1949 because of the death of Bill Carlton (Labor).

The Cobar by-election was held on the same day.

== Dates ==
Date	Event
30 January 1949	Bill Carlton died.
11 February 1949	Writ of election issued by the Speaker of the Legislative Assembly and close of electoral rolls.
24 February 1949	Nominations
12 March 1949	Polling day, between the hours of 8 am and 8 pm
24 March 1949	Return of writ

== Result ==
1949 Concord by-election Saturday 12 March
Party	Candidate	Votes	%	±%
Liberal	Brice Mutton	10,495	47.0	
Labor	James Moloney	9,353	21.9	
Lang Labor	Lyle Armstrong	2,503	11.2	
Total formal votes		22,351	98.1	−0.4
Informal votes		422	1.9	+0.4
Turnout		22,773	90.7	−5.2
Two-party-preferred result
Liberal	Brice Mutton	11,184	50.04	+3.64
Labor	James Moloney	11,167	49.96	−3.64
Liberal gain from Labor		Swing	3.64	

== See also ==
- Electoral results for the district of Concord
- List of New South Wales state by-elections
