= Thomas Murphy (Australian politician) =

Australian politician

Personal details
- Born: 13 December 1906 Sydney
- Died: 11 September 1978 (aged 71) Sydney
- Party: Labor Party

Thomas Patrick Murphy (13 December 1906 – 11 September 1978) was an Australian politician and a member of the New South Wales Legislative Assembly between 1953 and 1968. He was a member of the Labor Party (ALP) and held the minor government position of Assistant Minister in 1964–65.

== Biography ==
Murphy was the son of a railway worker and was educated in Patrician Brothers schools in rural NSW. He worked as a clerk in the New South Wales Government Railways between 1923 and 1953. During World War Two he served in the Middle East with the Royal Australian Army Medical Corps of the Second Australian Imperial Force and reached the rank of sergeant. Following demobilization, Murphy settled in Concord in the western suburbs of Sydney and became involved in community organizations including the Returned and Services League of Australia and the Hibernian Australian Catholic Benefits Society, a provider of health and other insurance.

After an unsuccessful attempt to win the seat in 1950, Murphy was elected to parliament as the Labor member for Concord at the 1953 state election. He defeated the incumbent Liberal member John Adamson. The 1953 election saw Labor make significant gains in marginal seats, particularly in the western suburbs. The seat of Concord was highly marginal but Murphy was able to retain it for Labor at the next 4 elections, usually by less than 1000 votes and in 1956 and 1965 by less than 100 votes (approximately 0.2% of the total votes cast). Murphy was appointed to the minor government post of Assistant Minister between 30 April 1964 and 13 May 1965 but he held no other party, parliamentary or ministerial office. The seat of Concord was abolished at the 1968 election and Murphy unsuccessfully stood for the new seat of Yaralla. He retired from public life after his defeat but became a successful businessman with investments in motels and the wholesale shoe business.

New South Wales Legislative Assembly
Preceded by John Adamson	Member for Concord; 1953–1968	Succeeded by seat abolished
