= Robert Dewley =

Australian politician

Personal details
- Born: 25 November 1913 Rose Bay, New South Wales
- Died: 23 May 1996 (aged 82)
- Party: Liberal Party

Robert Charles Dewley (25 November 1913 – 23 May 1996) was an Australian politician. He was a member of the New South Wales Legislative Assembly from 1947 until 1953. He was a member of the Liberal Party.

Dewley was born in Rose Bay, New South Wales with the birth surname of Lambourne. He was the son of an insurance inspector and was educated at Randwick Boys High School . Dewley initially worked as a butcher in Rozelle, New South Wales but in 1947 he started a car dealership in Stanmore, New South Wales. He was an alderman on Drummoyne Municipal Council from 1943–44 and 1955–59. He was elected to the New South Wales Parliament at the 1947 state election as the Liberal member for Drummoyne. Dewley defeated the sitting Labor member Robert Greig. He retained the seat at the subsequent election in 1950 but was defeated at the 1953 election. He did not hold ministerial, parliamentary or party office.

New South Wales Legislative Assembly
Preceded by Robert Greig	Member for Drummoyne; 1947 – 1953	Succeeded by Roy Jackson
