= 1950 New South Wales state election =

State election for New South Wales, Australia in June 1950

← 1947	17 June 1950	1953 →

All 94 seats in the New South Wales Legislative Assembly 48 Assembly seats were needed for a majority
- Registered: 1,919,479
- Turnout: 1,611,349 (92.75%) (▼1.86 pp)
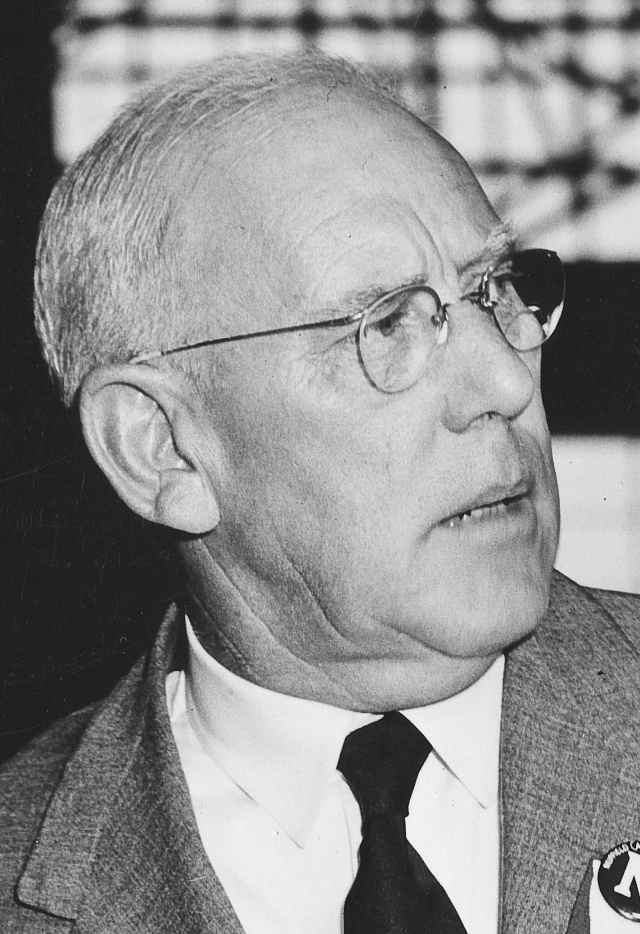

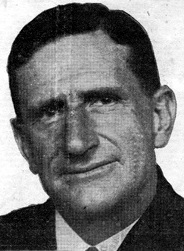

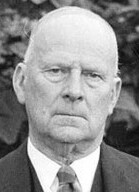
	First party	Second party	Third party
Leader	Jim McGirr	Vernon Treatt	Michael Bruxner
Party	Labor	Liberal	Country
Leader since	6 February 1947	20 March 1946	27 April 1932
Leader's seat	Liverpool (contested; won)	Woollahra	Tenterfield
Last election	52 seats, 45.95%	18 seats, 29.60%	15 seats, 10.22%
Seats won	46	29	17
Seat change	▼6	▲11	▲2
Popular vote	753,268	604,428	144,573
Percentage	46.75%	37.51%	8.97%
Swing	▲0.8%	▲7.91%	▼1.25%
- Two-candidate-preferred margin by electorate
Premier before election
Jim McGirr
Labor
Elected Premier
Jim McGirr
Labor

The 1950 New South Wales state election was held on 17 June 1950. It was conducted in single member constituencies with compulsory preferential voting and was held on boundaries created at a 1949 redistribution. The election was for all of the 94 seats in the Legislative Assembly, which was an increase of 4 seats since the previous election.

At the time of the election, Labor had been in power for 9 years, Jim McGirr had been the Premier for 3 years and Labor had lost power federally to the Liberal Party of Robert Menzies 6 months earlier. The NSW Labor Government, under McGirr, was beginning to show signs of age. Severe divisions had appeared in the party at the beginning of 1950 when the state executive expelled 4 members of the Assembly James Geraghty (North Sydney), John Seiffert (Monaro), Roy Heferen (Barwon) and Fred Stanley (Lakemba) from the parliamentary party for breaking party solidarity during the 1949 indirect election of the Legislative Council. They had apparently voted for Bill McNamara who was 9th on the Labor ticket. All four served out the remainder of their terms as independents and stood in the election as Independent Labor candidates. An attempt by the caucus to overturn the expulsions led to resentment among party branch members which was reflected in the pre-selection defeat of four members who were standing for re-election; Baden Powell, Bob Gorman, Mary Quirk and Kevin Dwyer. Two members of Lang Labor: Chris Lang (Auburn) and Lilian Fowler (Newtown) were still in the Assembly and they both stood for re-election.

In contrast, the Liberal Party, which had been founded by in 1945, continued to consolidate its position as the pre-eminent conservative party. It was led by Vernon Treatt and presented a solid front to the electorate. The Liberals had won three seats from Labor at by-elections for Concord, Coogee and Kogarah. The Country Party was led by Michael Bruxner and remained closely aligned to the Liberals.

== Key dates ==
Date	Event
22 May 1950	The Legislative Assembly was dissolved, and writs were issued by the Governor to proceed with an election.
22 May 1950	Nominations for candidates for the election closed at noon.
17 June 1950	Polling day.
30 June 1950	Third McGirr ministry sworn in.
19 July 1950	Last day for the writs to be returned and the results formally declared.
12 July 1950	Opening of 36th Parliament.

== Results ==
The result of the election was a hung parliament. The balance of power lay with the two re-elected Independent Labor members, James Geraghty and John Seiffert, who had been expelled from the party for disloyalty during the previous parliament. As Seiffert had not stood against an endorsed Labor candidate for Monaro, he was readmitted to the party and together with the support of Geraghty, McGirr and Labor were able to stay in power. Labor gained the two Lang Labor seats. Of the other two seats held by expelled members, Labor re-gained Lakemba while the Country Party won Barwon. Labor also lost Hawkesbury to the Liberal Party and Mudgee and Dubbo to the Country Party. The sitting Independent members for South Coast and Gloucester had joined the Liberal Party and the Country Party respectively prior to this election. During the parliament there were 4 by-elections with the result of a net gain to Labor of 1 seat (Ashfield).

The near loss of the election weakened McGirr's position and he was replaced as premier by Joseph Cahill in April 1952. Treatt remained the Leader of the Opposition during the period of this parliament and Bruxner continued as the Leader of the Country Party, a position he had held since 1932.

New South Wales state election, 17 June 1950 Legislative Assembly << 1947–1953 >>
Enrolled voters	1,919,479 (Note: There were 1,768,801 enrolled voters in 86 contested electorates and 150,878 were enrolled in 8 uncontested electorates (5 Country, 2 Liberal and 1 Labor).)				
Votes cast	1,611,349		Turnout	92.75	−1,86
Informal votes	28,964		Informal	1.77	−0.22
Summary of votes by party
Party	Primary votes	%	Swing	Seats	Change
Labor	753,268	46.75	+0.8	46	−6
Liberal	604,428	37.51	+5.8	29	+10
Country	144,573	8.97	−1.3	17	+2
Independent	37,229	2.31	−3.6	0	−2
Independent Labor	26,596	1.65	+0.8	2	+2
Lang Labor	19,683	1.22	−2.8	0	−2
Communist	13,589	0.84	−0.9	0	0
Independent Country	6,445	0.40	+0.40	0	0
Independent Liberal	5,538	0.34	−0.2	0	0
Total	1,611,349			94	

The final two party preferred result was Labor 51% to Coalition 49%.

== Retiring members ==
=== Labor ===
- Bill Dunn (Mudgee)
- Kevin Dwyer (Redfern) — lost preselection
- Bob Gorman (Annandale) — lost preselection for Newtown-Annandale
- Baden Powell (Wollongong-Kembla) — lost preselection

== Seats changing party representation ==
Seat	1947		1950	
Seat	Party	Member	Member	Party
Annandale	Labor	Bob Gorman	Seat abolished	
Ashburnham	Labor	Edgar Dring	Seat abolished	
Auburn	Lang Labor	Chris Lang	Edgar Dring	Labor
Barwon	Labor	Roy Heferen (Note: Roy Heferen had been expelled from Labor as a result of voting against the party ticket in the 1949 election for the Legislative Council and contested the seat as an independent labor candidate.)	Geoff Crawford	Country
Botany	Labor	Robert Heffron	Seat abolished	
Burrinjuck		New seat (Note: Burrinjuck was a new seat, largely replacing Yass, held by Labor (Bill Sheahan).)	Bill Sheahan	Labor
Collaroy		New seat (Note: Collaroy was a notional Liberal seat created out of the districts of Hornsby and Manly, both of which were held by the Liberal party.)	Robert Askin	Liberal
Concord (Note: Concord was won by the Liberal Party at a by-election in 1949 caused by the death of Labor's Bill Carlton.)	Labor		John Adamson	Liberal
Coogee (Note: Coogee was won by the Liberal Party at a by-election in 1948 caused by the death of Labor's Lou Cunningham.)	Labor		Kevin Ellis	Liberal
Corowa	Country	Ebenezer Kendell	Seat abolished	
Darlinghurst		New seat (Note: New seat notionally Labor.)	Frank Finnan	Labor
Dubbo	Labor	Clarrie Robertson	Robert Medcalf	Country
Earlwood		New seat (Note: New seat notionally Liberal.)	Eric Willis	Liberal
Eastwood		New seat	Eric Hearnshaw	Liberal
Gloucester	Independent	Ray Fitzgerald		Country
Gosford		New seat	Harold Jackson	Liberal
Hawkesbury (Note: The redistribution made Hawkesbury a notional Liberal seat.)	Labor	Frank Finnan	Bernie Deane	Liberal
Kahibah		New seat	Joshua Arthur	Labor
Kogarah (Note: Kogarah was won by the Liberal Party at a by-election in 1948 caused by the death of Labor's William Currey.)	Labor		Douglas Cross	Liberal
Lachlan	Country	Robert Medcalf	Seat abolished	
Lake Macquarie		New seat	Jim Simpson	Labor
Liverpool		New seat	Jim McGirr	Labor
Maroubra		New seat (Note: Maroubra was a new seat, largely replacing Botany, held by Labor (Bob Heffron).)	Bob Heffron	Labor
Monaro	Labor	John Seiffert		Independent Labor
Mudgee	Labor	Bill Dunn	Frederick Cooke	Country
Namoi	Labor	Raymond Hamilton	Seat abolished	
Newtown	Lang Labor	Lilian Fowler	Seat abolished	
Newtown-Annandale		New seat	Arthur Greenup	Labor
North Sydney	Labor	James Geraghty		Independent Labor
South Coast	Independent	Jack Beale		Liberal
Sutherland		New seat	Cecil Monro	Liberal
Yass	Labor	Bill Sheahan	Seat abolished	

== See also ==
- Candidates of the 1950 New South Wales state election
- Members of the New South Wales Legislative Assembly, 1950–1953
