= Brice Mutton =

Australian politician (1890–1949)

Member of the New South Wales Legislative Assembly for Concord
- In office 12 March 1949 – 7 December 1949
- Preceded by: Bill Carlton
- Succeeded by: John Adamson

Personal details
- Born: 8 January 1890 Lerryn, Cornwall, United Kingdom
- Died: 7 December 1949 (aged 59) Concord, New South Wales
- Party: Liberal Party
- Children: Lerryn Mutton
- Occupation: Shipwright

Brice Mutton (8 January 1890 – 7 December 1949) was an Australian politician and a member of the New South Wales Legislative Assembly for nine months in 1949. He was a member of the Liberal Party.

== Early life ==
Mutton was born in Lerryn, Cornwall and was the son of a carpenter. He was educated to elementary level in Cornwall and became a builder. He emigrated to Australia in 1913 and was employed at Cockatoo Docks as shipwright and later established his own building business. He moved to Concord, New South Wales in 1923 and became active in community organizations including the Parents and Citizens Association and the Police Boys Club. Mutton was elected as an alderman of Concord Council between 1942 and 1949 and was the mayor from 1942 to 1944 and in 1947. His son Lerryn Mutton was a member of the Legislative Assembly between 1968 and 1978.

== State Parliament ==
Mutton was the unsuccessful Liberal Democrat candidate for Concord at the 1944 state election. He was defeated by Labor's Bill Carlton. He was also unsuccessful as the Liberal candidate at the next election in 1947. Mutton was eventually elected to parliament as the member for Concord at the 1949 by-election caused by the death of Carlton. However, he died suddenly nine months after his election, suffering a fatal heart attack at his home in Concord West. He did not hold party, parliamentary or ministerial office.

New South Wales Legislative Assembly
Preceded by Bill Carlton	Member for Concord; 1949	Succeeded by John Adamson
