= John Adamson (New South Wales politician) =

Australian politician (1910–1984)

Personal details
- Born: 12 May 1910 North Sydney, New South Wales, Australia
- Died: 8 March 1984 (aged 73) Concord, New South Wales, Australia
- Party: Liberal Party
- Occupation: Politician

John Clark Adamson (12 May 1910 – 8 March 1984) was an Australian politician. He was a member of the New South Wales Legislative Assembly for a single term from 1950 until 1953. He was a member of the Liberal Party.

== Biography ==
Adamson was born in North Sydney, New South Wales, Australia, on 12 May 1910. He was the son of a solicitor and was educated at Parramatta High School and Sydney Teachers College.

He worked as a school teacher in Rozelle, New South Wales, between 1938 and 1950, and was an alderman on Marrickville Municipal Council between 1944 and 1948. Adamson was elected to the New South Wales Parliament as the Liberal member for Concord at the January 1950 by-election caused by the death of the sitting member Brice Mutton. He retained the seat at the state election held that year but was defeated at the 1953 state election. He did not hold ministerial or party office. Adamson returned to teaching and was the deputy principal of Newtown Boys' High School between 1972 and 1975.

New South Wales Legislative Assembly
Preceded by Brice Mutton	Member for Concord; 1950 – 1953	Succeeded by Tom Murphy
