= Bill Carlton =

Australian politician (1894–1949)

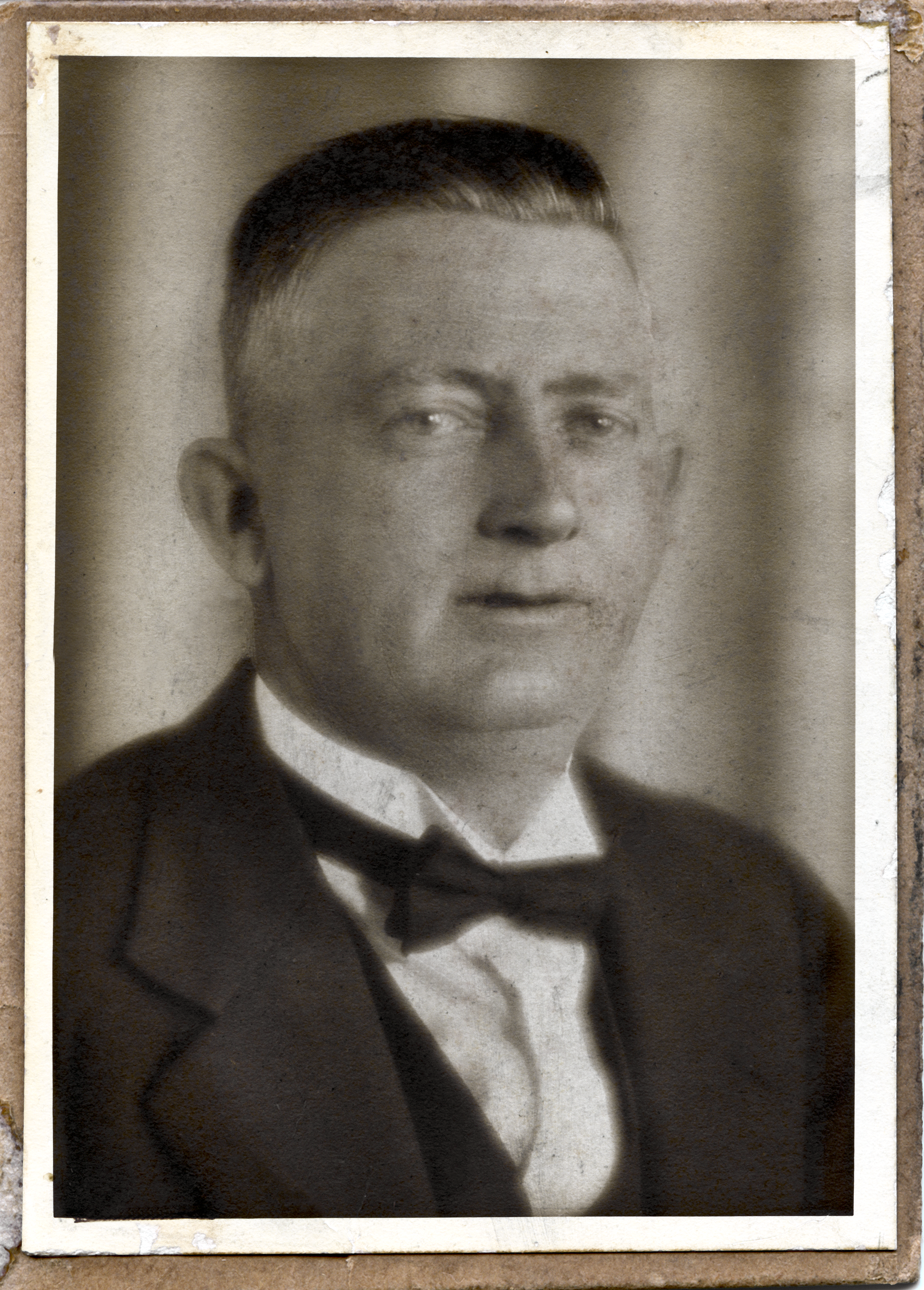

Personal details
- Born: 2 May 1894 Newcastle, New South Wales
- Died: 30 January 1949 (aged 54) Concord, New South Wales
- Party: Labor Party, Australian Labor Party (NSW)

William Joseph Carlton (2 May 1894 – 30 January 1949) was an Australian politician and a member of the New South Wales Legislative Assembly between 1935 and his death. He was a member of the Australian Labor Party (NSW) and Labor Party.

== Early life ==
Carlton was born in Newcastle, New South Wales and was the son of a waterside worker. He was educated to elementary level and was employed by the New South Wales Government Railways as a boilermaker's assistant. He became an organizer for the Australian Railways Union. During World War One, Carlton served as a private in a machine-gun company of the First Australian Imperial Force. Carlton was elected as an alderman of Glebe Municipal Council between 1929 and 1935.

== State Parliament ==
Carlton was elected to parliament as the Lang Labor member for the safe Labor seat of Glebe at the 1935 state election. He replaced the incumbent Lang Labor member Tom Keegan who had retired. The following year Lang's party and its Members of Parliament, including Carlton, were readmitted into the Labor Party. At the next election in 1938, Carlton faced a strong challenge from Horace Foley, the candidate for Robert Heffron's breakaway Industrial Labor Party, which Carlton won by less than 2% of the vote. Glebe was abolished by a redistribution at the 1941 and Carlton won Labor endorsement for the marginal seat of Concord. In Labor's landslide victory at that election, Carlton defeated the sitting incumbent United Australia Party member Stan Lloyd. Carlton retained the seat for Labor until his death in January 1949. He was the Labor Party whip between 1941 and 1947 but did not hold any other party, parliamentary of ministerial office.

New South Wales Legislative Assembly
Preceded by Tom Keegan	Member for Glebe; 1935 – 1941	Succeeded by Seat abolished
Preceded by Stan Lloyd	Member for Concord; 1941 – 1949	Succeeded by Brice Mutton
