= Electoral district of Concord =

Former electoral district in New South Wales, Australia

Concord was an electoral district of the Legislative Assembly of the Australian state of New South Wales, created in 1930, and named after and including the Sydney suburb of Concord. It was abolished in 1968.

== History ==
The suburb of Concord was part of the five member district of Ryde under proportional representation. Proportional representation was abolished in 1927, with the suburb of Concord being split between Ryde and Eastwood. Eastwood was abolished in the 1929 redistribution and the new district of Concord was created, being entirely south of the harbour, from Concord in the east to part of the suburb of Lidcombe. Concord was abolished in 1968 and largely replaced by Yaralla which extended west to the districts of Parramatta and Granville, while the southern part of the district was absorbed by Auburn.

== Members for Concord ==
Member	Party	Term
Henry McDicken	Labor	1930–1932
Stan Lloyd	United Australia	1932–1941
Bill Carlton	Labor	1941–1949
Brice Mutton	Liberal	1949–1949
John Adamson	Liberal	1949–1953
Thomas Murphy	Labor	1953–1968

== Election results ==
1965 New South Wales state election: Concord
Party	Candidate	Votes	%	±%
Labor	Thomas Murphy	10,883	47.8	−5.6
Liberal	Lerryn Mutton	10,721	47.1	+3.3
Democratic Labor	William Doherty	1,155	5.1	+2.3
Total formal votes		22,759	97.8	−1.0
Informal votes		509	2.2	+1.0
Turnout		23,268	94.7	+0.5
Two-party-preferred result
Labor	Thomas Murphy	11,425	50.2	−3.7
Liberal	Lerryn Mutton	11,334	49.8	+3.7
Labor hold		Swing	−3.7	
