= Members of the New South Wales Legislative Assembly, 1944–1947 =

Members of the New South Wales Legislative Assembly who served in the 34th parliament held their seats from 1944 to 1947. They were elected at the 1944 state election, and at by-elections. The opposition Democratic Party merged into the nascent Liberal Party in late 1944, becoming the New South Wales branch of the new party. The Speaker was Daniel Clyne.

Name	Party	Electorate	Term in office
Joshua Arthur	Labor	Hamilton	1935–1953
Jack Baddeley	Labor	Cessnock	1922–1949
Jeff Bate	Democratic/Liberal	Wollondilly	1938–1949
Jack Beale	Independent	South Coast	1942–1973
Ivan Black (Note: Neutral Bay Liberal MLA Reginald Weaver died on 12 November 1945. Liberal candidate Ivan Black won the resulting by-election on 15 December.)	Liberal	Neutral Bay	1945–1951, 1951–1962
George Booth	Labor	Kurri Kurri	1925–1960
George Brain	Democratic/Liberal	Willoughby	1943–1968
Michael Bruxner	Country	Tenterfield	1920–1962
Fred Cahill	Labor	Young	1941–1959
Joseph Cahill	Labor	Cook's River	1925–1959
Robert Cameron	Labor	Waratah	1927–1956
Bill Carlton	Labor	Concord	1935–1949
Bill Chaffey (Note: Tamworth MLA Bill Chaffey was elected as an independent, but joined the Country Party during this term.)	Independent/Country;^{[3]}	Tamworth	1940–1973
John Chanter	Labor	Lachlan	1943–1947
Daniel Clyne	Labor	King	1927–1956
Lou Cunningham	Labor	Coogee	1941–1948
William Currey	Labor	Kogarah	1941–1948
Douglas Darby (Note: Manly Liberal MLA Alfred Reid died on 5 August 1945. Liberal candidate Douglas Darby won the resulting by-election on 15 September.)	Liberal	Manly	1945–1978
Mat Davidson	Labor	Cobar	1918–1949
Billy Davies	Labor	Wollongong-Kembla	1917–1949
Doug Dickson	Country	Temora	1938–1960
Edgar Dring	Labor	Ashburnham	1941–1955
David Drummond	Country	Armidale	1920–1949
Bill Dunn	Labor	Mudgee	1910–1911, 1911–1932, 1935–1950
George Enticknap	Labor	Murrumbidgee	1941–1965
Clive Evatt	Labor	Hurstville	1939–1959
Frank Finnan	Labor	Hawkesbury	1941–1953
Ray Fitzgerald	Independent	Gloucester	1941–1962
Lilian Fowler	Lang Labor	Newtown	1944–1950
Howard Fowles	Labor	Illawarra	1941–1968
John Freeman (Note: Blacktown Labor MLA Frank Hill died on 11 July 1945. Labor candidate John Freeman won the resulting by-election on 18 August 1945.)	Labor	Blacktown	1945–1959
William Frith	Country	Lismore	1933–1953
James Geraghty	Labor	North Sydney	1941–1953
George Gollan	Democratic/Liberal	Parramatta	1932–1953
William Gollan	Labor	Randwick	1941–1962
Bob Gorman	Labor	Annandale	1933–1950
Eddie Graham	Labor	Wagga Wagga	1941–1957
Robert Greig	Labor	Drummoyne	1920–1927, 1941–1947
Raymond Hamilton	Labor	Namoi	1941–1950
Frank Hawkins	Labor	Newcastle	1935–1968
Eric Hearnshaw (Note: The Independent Democrat member for Ryde, James Shand died on 21 December 1944. Liberal candidate Eric Hearnshaw won the resulting by-election on 3 February 1945 in the first electoral test for the new conservative party.)	Liberal	Ryde	1945–1965
Roy Heferen	Labor	Barwon	1940–1950
Robert Heffron	Labor	Botany	1930–1968
Frank Hill	Labor	Blacktown	1941–1945
Ted Horsington	Labor	Sturt	1922–1947
Walter Howarth	Democratic/Liberal	Maitland	1932–1956
David Hunter	Democratic/Liberal	Croydon	1940–1976
John Hurley (Note: Albury Liberal MLA Alexander Mair resigned on 14 August 1946 in order to contest a seat in the Australian Senate at the 1946 federal election. Labor candidate John Hurley won the resulting by-election on 9 November.)	Labor	Albury	1946–1947
Gordon Jackett	Democratic/Liberal	Burwood	1935–1951
Joseph Jackson (Note: Manly MLA Alfred Reid and Nepean MLA Joseph Jackson were re-elected in 1944 as Independent Democrat candidates; Reid after losing preselection and Jackson after refusing Democratic endorsement. Both later joined the new Liberal Party. A third Independent Democrat, Sydney Storey, joined the Liberal Party in 1946.)	Independent Democrat/Liberal	Nepean	1922–1956
Les Jordan (Note: Oxley MLA Les Jordan had won his seat as an Independent Country candidate against independent George Mitchell at the 1944 state election. He had been previously refused endorsement due to the party's refusal to officially challenge MLAs who, like Mitchell, were serving in World War II; upon his election, he was admitted to the Country Party caucus.)	Independent Country/Country	Oxley	1944–1965
Gus Kelly	Labor	Bathurst	1925–1932, 1935–1967
Ebenezer Kendell (Note: Corowa MLA Christopher Lethbridge was elected as an independent, but joined the Liberal Party in 1946. He subsequently resigned on 16 August 1946 in order to contest the federal seat of Riverina at the 1946 federal election. Lethbridge contested the by-election for his old seat as the Liberal candidate on 9 November, but lost to Country Party candidate Ebenezer Kendell.)	Country	Corowa	1946–1950
Hamilton Knight	Labor	Hartley	1927–1947
Bill Lamb	Labor	Granville	1938–1962
Abe Landa	Labor	Bondi	1930–1965
Jack Lang (Note: Auburn Lang Labor MLA Jack Lang resigned on 15 August 1946 in order to contest the federal seat of Reid at the 1946 federal election. His son, Lang Labor candidate Chris Lang, won the resulting by-election on 9 November.)	Lang Labor	Auburn	1913–1943, 1943–1946
Chris Lang	Lang Labor	Auburn	1946–1950
Joe Lawson	Country	Murray	1932–1973
Carlo Lazzarini	Labor	Marrickville	1917–1952
Christopher Lethbridge	Independent/Liberal	Corowa	1937–1946
Donald Macdonald	Independent	Mosman	1941–1947
Alexander Mair	Democratic/Liberal	Albury	1932–1946
Clarrie Martin	Labor	Waverley	1930–1932, 1939–1953
Claude Matthews	Labor	Leichhardt	1934–1954
James McGirr	Labor	Bankstown	1922–1952
John McGrath	Labor	Rockdale	1941–1959
William McKell	Labor	Redfern	1917–1947
Roger Nott	Labor	Liverpool Plains	1941–1961
Bob O'Halloran	Labor	Orange	1920–1927, 1941–1947
Maurice O'Sullivan	Labor	Paddington	1927–1959
Mary Quirk	Labor	Balmain	1939–1950
Alfred Reid ^{[6]}	Independent Democrat/Liberal	Manly	1920–1922, 1925–1945
John Reid	Country	Casino	1930–1953
Jack Renshaw	Labor	Castlereagh	1941–1980
Athol Richardson (Note: Ashfield Liberal MLA Athol Richardson resigned on 16 August 1946 in order to contest the federal seat of Parkes at the 1946 federal election. He lost the federal contest, and recontested and won the by-election for his state seat on 9 November.)	Democratic/Liberal	Ashfield	1935–1946, 1946–1952
Clarrie Robertson	Labor	Dubbo	1942–1950, 1953–1959
Murray Robson	Democratic/Liberal	Vaucluse	1936–1957
D'Arcy Rose	Country	Upper Hunter	1939–1959
James Shand	Independent Democrat	Ryde	1926–1944
John Seiffert	Labor	Monaro	1941–1965
Tom Shannon	Labor	Phillip	1927–1954
Bill Sheahan	Labor	Yass	1941–1973
Fred Stanley	Labor	Lakemba	1927–1950
Stanley Stephens	Country	Byron	1944–1973
Sydney Storey	Independent Democrat/Liberal	Hornsby	1941–1962
John Sweeney	Labor	Bulli	1933–1947
Arthur Tonge	Labor	Canterbury	1926–1932, 1935–1962
Vernon Treatt	Democratic/Liberal	Woollahra	1938–1962
Jack Tully (Note: Goulburn Labor MLA Jack Tully resigned on 9 May 1946. His son, Labor candidate Laurie Tully won the resulting by-election on 1 June.)	Labor	Goulburn	1925–1932, 1935–1946
Laurie Tully	Labor	Goulburn	1946–1965
Harry Turner	Democratic/Liberal	Gordon	1937–1952
Roy Vincent	Country	Raleigh	1922–1953
Reginald Weaver	Democratic/Liberal	Neutral Bay	1917–1925, 1927–1945
George Weir	Labor	Dulwich Hill	1941–1953
Arthur Williams	Labor	Georges River	1940–1956
Cecil Wingfield	Country	Clarence	1938–1955
Henry Woodward	Labor	Lane Cove	1944–1947

== See also ==
- Second McKell ministry
- First McGirr ministry
- Results of the 1944 New South Wales state election
- Candidates of the 1944 New South Wales state election
