= Electoral results for the district of Blacktown =

Election results for Blacktown, New South Wales, Australia

Blacktown, an electoral district of the Legislative Assembly in the Australian state of New South Wales, was created in 1941.

Election	Member	Party
1941	Frank Hill	Labor
1944	Frank Hill	Labor
1945 by	John Freeman	Labor
1947	John Freeman	Labor
1950	John Freeman	Labor
1953	John Freeman	Labor
1956	John Freeman	Labor
1959	Alfred Dennis	Liberal / Independent
1962	Jim Southee	Labor
1965	Jim Southee	Labor
1968	Jim Southee	Labor
1971	Gordon Barnier	Labor
1973	Gordon Barnier	Labor
1976	Gordon Barnier	Labor
1978	Gordon Barnier	Labor
1981	John Aquilina	Labor
1984	John Aquilina	Labor
1988	John Aquilina	Labor
1991	Pam Allan	Labor
1995	Pam Allan	Labor
1999	Paul Gibson	Labor
2003	Paul Gibson	Labor
2007	Paul Gibson	Labor
2011	John Robertson	Labor
2015	John Robertson	Labor
2017 by	Stephen Bali	Labor
2019	Stephen Bali	Labor
2023	Stephen Bali	Labor

== Election results ==
=== Elections in the 2020s ===
==== 2023 ====
2023 New South Wales state election: Blacktown
Party	Candidate	Votes	%	±%
Labor	Stephen Bali	27,128	55.6	+0.9
Liberal	Allan Green	11,637	23.9	−2.6
Legalise Cannabis	Peter Foster	2,524	5.2	+5.2
Greens	Leonard Hobbs	2,521	5.2	−1.1
Animal Justice	Emma Kerin	2,357	4.8	+4.7
Liberal Democrats	Alexander Mishalow	1,559	3.2	+3.2
Sustainable Australia	Patrick Murphy	1,022	2.1	+2.1
Total formal votes		48,748	95.8	−0.1
Informal votes		2,123	4.2	+0.1
Turnout		50,871	86.8	−2.7
Two-party-preferred result
Labor	Stephen Bali	30,091	69.1	+2.5
Liberal	Allan Green	13,442	30.9	−2.5
Labor hold		Swing	+2.5	

=== Elections in the 2010s ===
==== 2019 ====
2019 New South Wales state election: Blacktown
Party	Candidate	Votes	%	±%
Labor	Stephen Bali	25,618	54.61	+0.76
Liberal	Allan Green	11,668	24.87	−5.93
One Nation	Amit Batish	3,368	7.18	+7.18
Christian Democrats	Josh Green	3,287	7.01	+1.06
Greens	Kirsten Gibbs	2,968	6.33	−0.02
Total formal votes		46,909	96.02	+0.69
Informal votes		1,942	3.98	−0.69
Turnout		48,851	88.80	−0.25
Two-party-preferred result
Labor	Stephen Bali	28,020	67.73	+4.55
Liberal	Allan Green	13,348	32.27	−4.55
Labor hold		Swing	+4.55	

==== 2017 by-election ====
2017 Blacktown by-election Saturday 14 October
Party	Candidate	Votes	%	±%
Labor	Stephen Bali	31,031	71.6	+17.7
Christian Democrats	Josh Green	6,540	15.1	+9.1
Greens	Chris Winslow	3,825	8.8	+2.5
Independent	Vivek Singha	1,966	4.5	+4.5
Total formal votes		43,362	95.1	−0.2
Informal votes		2,229	4.9	+0.2
Turnout		45,591	81.5	−7.5
Two-candidate-preferred result
Labor	Stephen Bali	33,208	82.3	+19.1
Christian Democrats	Josh Green	7,154	17.7	+17.7
Labor hold		Swing	N/A	

John Robertson (Labor) resigned.

==== 2015 ====
2015 New South Wales state election: Blacktown
Party	Candidate	Votes	%	±%
Labor	John Robertson	24,916	53.9	+9.5
Liberal	Raman Bhalla	14,250	30.8	−5.3
Greens	David Bate	2,937	6.3	+0.8
Christian Democrats	Meena Hanna	2,750	5.9	+0.2
No Land Tax	Julia Cacciotti	1,411	3.0	+3.0
Total formal votes		46,264	95.3	+0.6
Informal votes		2,262	4.7	−0.6
Turnout		48,526	89.0	−2.7
Two-party-preferred result
Labor	John Robertson	26,679	63.2	+9.0
Liberal	Raman Bhalla	15,547	36.8	−9.0
Labor hold		Swing	+9.0	

==== 2011 ====
2011 New South Wales state election: Blacktown
Party	Candidate	Votes	%	±%
Labor	John Robertson	19,419	44.1	−17.6
Liberal	Karlo Siljeg	16,047	36.4	+15.7
Christian Democrats	Bernie Gesling	2,639	6.0	−1.1
Greens	Paul Taylor	2,473	5.6	+0.8
Independent	Wayne Olling	1,177	2.7	+2.7
Independent	Louise Kedwell	1,166	2.6	+2.6
Independent	Greg Coulter	1,152	2.6	+2.6
Total formal votes		44,073	95.5	−0.7
Informal votes		2,074	4.5	+0.7
Turnout		46,147	93.4	0.0
Two-party-preferred result
Labor	John Robertson	20,796	53.7	−18.7
Liberal	Karlo Siljeg	17,910	46.3	+18.7
Labor hold		Swing	−18.7	

=== Elections in the 2000s ===
==== 2007 ====
2007 New South Wales state election: Blacktown
Party	Candidate	Votes	%	±%
Labor	Paul Gibson	25,698	61.7	−1.6
Liberal	Mark Spencer	8,649	20.8	+1.2
Christian Democrats	Bernie Gesling	2,965	7.1	+2.1
Greens	John Forrester	2,008	4.8	+0.7
AAFI	Donald McNaught	1,262	3.0	+1.3
Independent	F Ivor	678	1.6	+1.6
Unity	Bill Jiang	419	1.0	+0.2
Total formal votes		41,679	96.3	0.0
Informal votes		1,622	3.7	0.0
Turnout		43,301	93.4	
Two-party-preferred result
Labor	Paul Gibson	27,192	72.4	−2.5
Liberal	Mark Spencer	10,362	27.6	+2.5
Labor hold		Swing	−2.5	

==== 2003 ====
2003 New South Wales state election: Blacktown
Party	Candidate	Votes	%	±%
Labor	Paul Gibson	26,160	62.4	+7.7
Liberal	Geoff Bisby	8,297	19.8	−0.1
Christian Democrats	Bob Bawden	2,171	5.2	−0.5
Greens	Jason Bethune	1,771	4.2	+4.2
Independent	Goran Reves	940	2.2	+2.2
Democrats	David King	785	1.9	−5.9
One Nation	Brian Zahner	716	1.7	−7.8
AAFI	Lindon Dedman	694	1.7	−0.8
Unity	Selmen Alameddine	409	1.0	+1.0
Total formal votes		41,943	96.3	−0.2
Informal votes		1,611	3.7	+0.2
Turnout		43,554	92.9	
Two-party-preferred result
Labor	Paul Gibson	27,819	74.5	+5.1
Liberal	Geoff Bisby	9,529	25.5	−5.1
Labor hold		Swing	+5.1	

=== Elections in the 1990s ===
==== 1999 ====
1999 New South Wales state election: Blacktown
Party	Candidate	Votes	%	±%
Labor	Paul Gibson	22,714	54.7	−2.9
Liberal	Rick Holder	8,260	19.9	−10.8
One Nation	Bill Nixon	3,953	9.5	+9.5
Democrats	David King	3,178	7.7	+7.7
Christian Democrats	Bob Bawden	2,377	5.7	+1.4
AAFI	Ed Sherwood	1,015	2.4	−0.2
Total formal votes		41,497	96.5	+3.4
Informal votes		1,497	3.5	−3.4
Turnout		42,994	93.9	
Two-party-preferred result
Labor	Paul Gibson	24,861	69.4	+5.4
Liberal	Rick Holder	10,987	30.6	−5.4
Labor hold		Swing	+5.4	

==== 1995 ====
1995 New South Wales state election: Blacktown
Party	Candidate	Votes	%	±%
Labor	Pam Allan	17,654	52.6	+2.4
Liberal	Ross Roberts	10,982	32.7	+0.7
AAFI	Warwick Tyler	2,061	6.1	+6.1
Independent	Ray Owen	1,653	4.9	+4.9
Call to Australia	Bob Bawden	1,199	3.6	+1.0
Total formal votes		33,549	93.6	+6.2
Informal votes		2,312	6.4	−6.2
Turnout		35,861	94.3	
Two-party-preferred result
Labor	Pam Allan	19,340	60.6	+2.3
Liberal	Ross Roberts	12,574	39.4	−2.3
Labor hold		Swing	+2.3	

==== 1991 ====
1991 New South Wales state election: Blacktown
Party	Candidate	Votes	%	±%
Labor	Pam Allan	15,354	50.2	+1.9
Liberal	Ray Morris	9,802	32.1	−3.0
Independent	Con Constantine	3,253	10.6	+10.6
Democrats	Diana Shanks	1,182	3.9	+3.0
Call to Australia	John Jerrow	781	2.6	+2.6
Citizens Electoral Council	Paul Georiadis	199	0.7	+0.7
Total formal votes		30,571	87.3	−8.5
Informal votes		4,437	12.7	+8.5
Turnout		35,008	94.5	
Two-party-preferred result
Labor	Pam Allan	16,472	58.3	+3.4
Liberal	Ray Morris	11,784	41.7	−3.4
Labor hold		Swing	+3.4	

=== Elections in the 1980s ===
==== 1988 ====
1988 New South Wales state election: Blacktown
Party	Candidate	Votes	%	±%
Labor	John Aquilina	16,899	59.2	−7.1
Liberal	Allan Green	11,639	40.8	+7.1
Total formal votes		28,538	96.3	−0.2
Informal votes		1,110	3.7	+0.2
Turnout		29,648	93.7	
Labor hold		Swing	−7.1	

==== 1984 ====
1984 New South Wales state election: Blacktown
Party	Candidate	Votes	%	±%
Labor	John Aquilina	20,605	66.6	−6.5
Liberal	David Bannerman	10,319	33.4	+6.5
Total formal votes		30,924	96.6	+0.7
Informal votes		1,094	3.4	−0.7
Turnout		32,018	92.6	+0.2
Labor hold		Swing	−6.5	

==== 1981 ====
1981 New South Wales state election: Blacktown
Party	Candidate	Votes	%	±%
Labor	John Aquilina	20,777	73.1	0.0
Liberal	David Bannerman	7,644	26.9	+8.3
Total formal votes		28,421	95.9	
Informal votes		1,225	4.1	
Turnout		29,646	92.4	
Labor hold		Swing	−6.0	

=== Elections in the 1970s ===
==== 1978 ====
1978 New South Wales state election: Blacktown
Party	Candidate	Votes	%	±%
Labor	Gordon Barnier	23,742	73.1	+10.2
Liberal	Alfred Spiteri	6,039	18.6	−14.9
Democrats	Colin Mannix	2,702	8.3	+8.3
Total formal votes		32,483	96.5	−1.2
Informal votes		1,186	3.5	+1.2
Turnout		33,669	94.5	−0.6
Two-party-preferred result
Labor	Gordon Barnier	25,093	77.2	+12.5
Liberal	Alfred Spiteri	7,390	22.8	−12.5
Labor hold		Swing	+12.5	

==== 1976 ====
1976 New South Wales state election: Blacktown
Party	Candidate	Votes	%	±%
Labor	Gordon Barnier	19,590	62.9	+4.6
Liberal	John Lyon	10,436	33.5	+1.5
Independent	Raymond Ferguson	1,127	3.6	+3.6
Total formal votes		31,153	97.7	+2.4
Informal votes		725	2.3	−2.4
Turnout		31,878	95.1	+1.5
Two-party-preferred result
Labor	Gordon Barnier	20,163	64.7	+2.0
Liberal	John Lyon	10,990	35.3	−2.0
Labor hold		Swing	+2.0	

==== 1973 ====
1973 New South Wales state election: Blacktown
Party	Candidate	Votes	%	±%
Labor	Gordon Barnier	16,272	58.3	−1.1
Liberal	John Lyon	8,935	32.0	+0.6
Democratic Labor	Stan Aster-Stater	1,207	4.3	−1.6
Independent	George Perrin	1,135	4.1	+4.1
Independent	F. Ivor	366	1.3	+1.3
Total formal votes		27,915	95.3	
Informal votes		1,389	4.7	
Turnout		29,304	93.6	
Two-party-preferred result
Labor	Gordon Barnier	17,500	62.7	+0.4
Liberal	John Lyon	10,415	37.3	−0.4
Labor hold		Swing	+0.4	

==== 1971 ====
1971 New South Wales state election: Blacktown
Party	Candidate	Votes	%	±%
Labor	Gordon Barnier	17,174	59.4	+2.4
Liberal	Hilton Robinson	9,081	31.4	−4.0
Democratic Labor	Charles Ormel	1,702	5.9	−1.7
Independent	George Nicolaidis	976	3.4	+3.4
Total formal votes		28,933	97.4	
Informal votes		785	2.6	
Turnout		29,718	93.1	
Two-party-preferred result
Labor	Gordon Barnier	18,002	62.2	+3.3
Liberal	Hilton Robinson	10,931	37.8	−3.3
Labor hold		Swing	+3.3	

=== Elections in the 1960s ===
==== 1968 ====
1968 New South Wales state election: Blacktown
Party	Candidate	Votes	%	±%
Labor	Jim Southee	13,751	54.0	+4.2
Liberal	Ralph Stewart	9,781	38.4	−8.8
Democratic Labor	Kenneth Brown	1,944	7.6	+7.6
Total formal votes		25,476	96.4	
Informal votes		959	3.6	
Turnout		26,435	94.6	
Two-party-preferred result
Labor	Jim Southee	14,140	55.5	+4.8
Liberal	Ralph Stewart	11,336	44.5	−4.8
Labor hold		Swing	+4.8	

==== 1965 ====
1965 New South Wales state election: Blacktown
Party	Candidate	Votes	%	±%
Labor	Jim Southee	17,361	52.8	−8.9
Liberal	Denys Clarke	14,560	44.2	+5.9
Independent	Malcolm Towner	993	3.0	+3.0
Total formal votes		32,914	97.6	−0.2
Informal votes		822	2.4	+0.2
Turnout		33,736	93.9	−0.3
Two-party-preferred result
Labor	Jim Southee	17,560	53.4	−8.3
Liberal	Denys Clarke	15,354	46.6	+8.3
Labor hold		Swing	−8.3	

==== 1962 ====
1962 New South Wales state election: Blacktown
Party	Candidate	Votes	%	±%
Labor	Jim Southee	17,255	61.7	+10.2
Liberal	Ross Shuttleworth	10,713	38.3	−4.6
Total formal votes		27,968	97.8	
Informal votes		632	2.2	
Turnout		28,600	94.2	
Labor gain from Liberal		Swing	+8.7	

- Blacktown became a notional Labor seat in the redistribution.

=== Elections in the 1950s ===
==== 1959 ====
1959 New South Wales state election: Blacktown
Party	Candidate	Votes	%	±%
Liberal	Alfred Dennis	13,519	49.9	
Labor	Jim Southee	12,044	44.5	
Democratic Labor	Francis Moffitt	834	3.1	
Independent	Frank Finlayson	691	2.6	
Total formal votes		27,088	97.7	
Informal votes		625	2.3	
Turnout		27,713	93.5	
Two-party-preferred result
Liberal	Alfred Dennis	14,650	54.1	
Labor	Jim Southee	12,438	45.9	
Liberal gain from Labor		Swing		

==== 1956 ====
1956 New South Wales state election: Blacktown
Party	Candidate	Votes	%	±%
Labor	John Freeman	15,188	55.5	−5.7
Liberal	Graham Cullis	12,189	44.5	+8.9
Total formal votes		27,377	98.4	+0.4
Informal votes		451	1.6	−0.4
Turnout		27,828	93.7	−0.4
Labor hold		Swing	−8.5	

==== 1953 ====
1953 New South Wales state election: Blacktown
Party	Candidate	Votes	%	±%
Labor	John Freeman	14,424	61.2	
Liberal	George Walker	8,391	35.6	
Communist	Melville McCalman	756	3.2	
Total formal votes		23,571	98.0	
Informal votes		477	2.0	
Turnout		24,048	94.1	
Two-party-preferred result
Labor	John Freeman	15,088	64.0	
Liberal	George Walker	8,486	36.0	
Labor hold		Swing		

==== 1950 ====
1950 New South Wales state election: Blacktown
Party	Candidate	Votes	%	±%
Labor	John Freeman	13,229	55.5	
Liberal	Nancy Saxby	10,616	44.5	
Total formal votes		23,845	98.8	
Informal votes		283	1.2	
Turnout		24,128	93.2	
Labor hold		Swing		

=== Elections in the 1940s ===
==== 1947 ====
1947 New South Wales state election: Blacktown
Party	Candidate	Votes	%	±%
Labor	John Freeman	13,392	53.8	+2.6
Liberal	Francis Izon	8,939	35.9	+16.8
Lang Labor	Ian Grant	1,387	5.6	−10.9
Communist	Fred Wingrave	1,168	4.7	+4.7
Total formal votes		24,886	98.0	+2.4
Informal votes		518	2.0	−2.4
Turnout		25,404	94.7	+3.8
Labor hold		Swing	N/A	

- Preferences were not distributed.

==== 1945 by-election ====
1945 Blacktown by-election Saturday 18 August
Party	Candidate	Votes	%	±%
Labor	John Freeman	10,879	55.5	+4.3
Liberal	George Maunder	6,344	32.4	+13.3
Independent	Ernest Phelps	1,913	9.8	
Independent	John Cammell	453	2.3	
Total formal votes		19,589	97.3	+1.7
Informal votes		538	2.7	−1.7
Turnout		20,127	82.8	−8.1
Labor hold		Swing		

Frank Hill (Labor) died. Preferences were not distributed.

==== 1944 ====
1944 New South Wales state election: Blacktown
Party	Candidate	Votes	%	±%
Labor	Frank Hill	10,364	51.2	−6.3
Democratic	Francis Izon	3,868	19.1	−23.4
Independent	Ray Watson	2,649	13.1	+13.1
Lang Labor	William Morgan	1,701	8.4	+8.4
Lang Labor	Lucy Steel	1,645	8.1	+8.1
Total formal votes		20,227	95.6	−1.6
Informal votes		927	4.4	+1.6
Turnout		21,154	90.9	−2.2
Labor hold		Swing	N/A	

- Preferences were not distributed.

==== 1941 ====
1941 New South Wales state election: Blacktown
Party	Candidate	Votes	%	±%
Labor	Frank Hill	10,909	57.5	
United Australia	Arthur Francis	8,069	42.5	
Total formal votes		18,978	97.2	
Informal votes		549	2.8	
Turnout		19,527	93.1	
Labor notional hold		Swing		
