= Results of the 1944 New South Wales state election =

State election for New South Wales, Australia in May 1944

New South Wales state election, 27 May 1944 Legislative Assembly << 1941–1947 >>
Enrolled voters	1,732,706 (Note: There were 1,433,166 enrolled voters in 74 contested electorates and 299,540 were enrolled in 16 uncontested electorates (13 Labor, 1 Democrat, 1 Country and 1 Independent).)				
Votes cast	1,310,270		Turnout	91.42	−1.10
Informal votes	43,329		Informal	3.31	+0.78
Summary of votes by party
Party	Primary votes	%	Swing	Seats	Change
Labor	572,600	45.20	−5.60	56	+2
Democratic	239,610	18.91	+1.38 (Note: Compared to United Australia Party at 1941 election)	12	−2
Country	131,950	10.41	−0.64	10	−2
Lang Labor	118,174	9.33	+9.33	2	+2
Independent	72,431	5.72	−0.41	5	+1
Liberal Democratic	49,325	3.89	+3.89	0	0
Independent Democrat	30,532	2.41	−0.84 (Note: Compared to Independent UAP at 1941 election)	4	−1
Independent Labor	22,697	1.79	−0.35	0	–1
Communist	21,982	1.74	+1.74	0	–
Independent Country	6,670	0.53	+0.53	1	+1
State Labor	0	0	−5.64	0	–
All others	970	0.08	−0.62	0	–
Total	1,266,941			90	

This is a list of electoral district results for the 1944 New South Wales state election.

== Results by electoral district ==
=== Albury ===
1944 New South Wales state election: Albury
Party	Candidate	Votes	%	±%
Democratic	Alexander Mair	7,139	53.1	+0.6
Labor	John King	6,316	46.9	−0.6
Total formal votes		13,455	97.9	−1.1
Informal votes		281	2.1	+1.1
Turnout		13,736	89.9	−1.8
Democratic hold		Swing	+0.6	

=== Annandale ===
1944 New South Wales state election: Annandale
Party	Candidate	Votes	%	±%
Labor	Bob Gorman	10,089	56.2	−19.5
Lang Labor	Ross Pryor	6,558	36.5	+36.5
Independent	Arthur Hagen	1,322	7.4	+7.4
Total formal votes		17,969	94.7	+0.4
Informal votes		1,010	5.3	−0.4
Turnout		18,979	91.8	+1.3
Labor hold		Swing	N/A	

- Preferences were not distributed.

=== Armidale ===
1944 New South Wales state election: Armidale
Party	Candidate	Votes	%	±%
Country	David Drummond	6,731	51.3	−1.0
Labor	Herbert Oxford	6,380	48.7	+1.0
Total formal votes		13,111	97.9	−0.6
Informal votes		283	2.1	+0.6
Turnout		13,394	90.8	−2.1
Country hold		Swing	−1.0	

=== Ashburnham ===
1944 New South Wales state election: Ashburnham
Party	Candidate	Votes	%	±%
Labor	Edgar Dring	7,418	58.4	+3.8
Country	Charles McCarron	5,278	41.6	−3.8
Total formal votes		12,696	98.0	−0.4
Informal votes		264	2.0	+0.4
Turnout		12,960	91.4	−2.8
Labor hold		Swing	+3.8	

=== Ashfield ===
1944 New South Wales state election: Ashfield
Party	Candidate	Votes	%	±%
Democratic	Athol Richardson	11,240	53.4	−5.2
Labor	William Bodkin	9,791	46.6	+5.2
Total formal votes		21,031	96.8	−1.2
Informal votes		688	3.2	+1.2
Turnout		21,719	93.8	+0.7
Democratic hold		Swing	−5.2	

=== Auburn ===
1944 New South Wales state election: Auburn
Party	Candidate	Votes	%	±%
Lang Labor	Jack Lang	12,871	65.8	+65.8
Labor	Patrick Mooney	6,699	34.2	−35.5
Total formal votes		19,570	96.1	+2.0
Informal votes		794	3.9	−2.0
Turnout		20,364	93.1	−0.5
Member changed to Lang Labor from Labor		Swing	N/A	

- Jack Lang was the sitting MP for Auburn, who won the previous election as a Labor candidate.

=== Balmain ===
1944 New South Wales state election: Balmain
Party	Candidate	Votes	%	±%
Labor	Mary Quirk	10,729	58.3	−2.3
Communist	Stanley Moran	5,186	28.2	+28.2
Democratic	Malinda Ivey	2,480	13.5	+13.5
Total formal votes		18,395	96.7	+1.5
Informal votes		618	3.3	−1.5
Turnout		19,013	93.2	−0.5
Labor hold		Swing	N/A	

- Preferences were not distributed.

=== Bankstown ===
1944 New South Wales state election: Bankstown
Party	Candidate	Votes	%	±%
Labor	James McGirr	12,507	59.0	−4.3
Lang Labor	Stephen Roberts	8,706	41.0	+41.0
Total formal votes		21,213	94.8	−1.7
Informal votes		1,156	5.2	+1.7
Turnout		22,369	92.7	−0.4
Labor hold		Swing	N/A	

=== Barwon ===
1944 New South Wales state election: Barwon
Party	Candidate	Votes	%	±%
Labor	Roy Heferen	7,136	55.6	−2.2
Independent	Ben Wade	5,703	44.4	+44.4
Total formal votes		12,839	98.0	−0.9
Informal votes		268	2.0	+0.9
Turnout		13,107	88.4	−4.0
Labor hold		Swing	N/A	

=== Bathurst ===
1944 New South Wales state election: Bathurst
Party	Candidate	Votes	%	±%
Labor	Gus Kelly	8,579	61.3	−38.7
Country	Archibald Gardiner	5,421	38.7	+38.7
Total formal votes		14,000	97.9	
Informal votes		297	2.1	
Turnout		14,297	89.7	
Labor hold		Swing	N/A	

=== Blacktown ===
1944 New South Wales state election: Blacktown
Party	Candidate	Votes	%	±%
Labor	Frank Hill	10,364	51.2	−6.3
Democratic	Francis Izon	3,868	19.1	−23.4
Independent	Ray Watson	2,649	13.1	+13.1
Lang Labor	William Morgan	1,701	8.4	+8.4
Lang Labor	Lucy Steel	1,645	8.1	+8.1
Total formal votes		20,227	95.6	−1.6
Informal votes		927	4.4	+1.6
Turnout		21,154	90.9	−2.2
Labor hold		Swing	N/A	

- Preferences were not distributed.

=== Bondi ===
1944 New South Wales state election: Bondi
Party	Candidate	Votes	%	±%
Labor	Abe Landa	9,521	43.6	−1.5
Democratic	Frank Browne	6,505	29.8	−14.4
Lang Labor	Leslie Hallett	3,241	14.8	+14.8
Liberal Democratic	Alexander Stewart	2,465	11.3	+11.3
Independent Labor	Alfred Rosen	126	0.6	+0.6
Total formal votes		21,858	95.1	−3.4
Informal votes		1,116	4.9	+3.4
Turnout		22,974	92.6	+1.1
Two-party-preferred result
Labor	Abe Landa	11,164	51.1	−3.1
Democratic	Frank Browne	10,694	48.9	+3.1
Labor hold		Swing	−3.1	

=== Botany ===
1944 New South Wales state election: Botany
Party	Candidate	Votes	%	±%
Labor	Bob Heffron	unopposed		
Labor hold				

=== Bulli ===
1944 New South Wales state election: Bulli
Party	Candidate	Votes	%	±%
Labor	John Sweeney	6,305	48.4	−26.3
Communist	John Martin	4,016	30.8	+30.8
Independent Labor	Lawrence Baines	2,049	15.7	+15.7
Independent Labor	Maurice Twomey	659	5.1	+5.1
Total formal votes		13,029	95.6	+1.4
Informal votes		596	4.4	−1.4
Turnout		13,625	92.5	−0.7
After distribution of preferences
Labor	John Sweeney	6,568	50.4	
Communist	John Martin	4,121	31.6	
Independent Labor	Lawrence Baines	2,340	18.0	
Labor hold		Swing	N/A	

- Preferences were not distributed to completion.

=== Burwood ===
1944 New South Wales state election: Burwood
Party	Candidate	Votes	%	±%
Democratic	Gordon Jackett	8,253	38.6	+9.8
Labor	Cliff Mallam	7,310	34.2	−4.7
Communist	Stanley Coulton	3,010	14.1	+14.1
Liberal Democratic	Keith Sutherland	2,802	13.1	+13.1
Total formal votes		21,375	96.5	−1.6
Informal votes		780	3.5	+1.6
Turnout		22,155	93.8	+0.1
Two-party-preferred result
Democratic	Gordon Jackett	11,205	52.4	+52.4
Labor	Cliff Mallam	10,170	47.6	+6.3
Member changed to Democratic from Ind. United Australia		Swing	N/A	

- Gordon Jackett had been elected at the previous election as an Independent UAP candidate, and held the seat as a Democratic member.

=== Byron ===
1944 New South Wales state election: Byron
Party	Candidate	Votes	%	±%
Country	Stanley Stephens	4,598	34.8	−21.3
Labor	Arthur Dodd	3,848	29.1	+29.1
Country	Frederick Stuart	2,232	16.9	+16.9
Country	Alick Buckley	2,056	15.6	+15.6
Independent Labor	John Regan	469	3.6	+3.6
Total formal votes		13,203	97.7	+0.5
Informal votes		307	2.3	−0.5
Turnout		13,510	89.5	−4.9
Two-party-preferred result
Country	Stanley Stephens	8,239	62.4	+6.3
Labor	Arthur Dodd	4,964	37.6	+37.6
Country hold		Swing	N/A	

=== Canterbury ===
1944 New South Wales state election: Canterbury
Party	Candidate	Votes	%	±%
Labor	Arthur Tonge	14,932	72.1	−5.9
Lang Labor	Claude Allen	5,769	27.9	+27.9
Total formal votes		20,701	92.9	−1.3
Informal votes		1,764	7.9	+1.3
Turnout		22,465	94.0	−0.8
Labor hold		Swing	N/A	

=== Casino ===
1944 New South Wales state election: Casino
Party	Candidate	Votes	%	±%
Country	John Reid	7,502	57.1	+9.5
Labor	Denis Holmes	5,645	42.9	+9.8
Total formal votes		13,147	97.3	−1.0
Informal votes		366	2.7	+1.0
Turnout		13,513	88.6	−4.2
Country hold		Swing	−3.8	

=== Castlereagh ===
1944 New South Wales state election: Castlereagh
Party	Candidate	Votes	%	±%
Labor	Jack Renshaw	7,254	61.3	+12.1
Country	Alfred Yeo	4,574	38.7	−0.9
Total formal votes		11,828	97.9	−0.7
Informal votes		253	2.1	+0.7
Turnout		12,081	86.8	−4.4
Labor hold		Swing	+2.2	

=== Cessnock ===
1944 New South Wales state election: Cessnock
Party	Candidate	Votes	%	±%
Labor	Jack Baddeley	unopposed		
Labor hold				

=== Clarence ===
1944 New South Wales state election: Clarence
Party	Candidate	Votes	%	±%
Country	Cecil Wingfield	unopposed		
Country hold				

=== Cobar ===
1944 New South Wales state election: Cobar
Party	Candidate	Votes	%	±%
Labor	Mat Davidson	8,352	78.3	−6.1
Lang Labor	William Burgess	2,313	21.7	+21.7
Total formal votes		10,665	97.0	0.0
Informal votes		330	3.0	0.0
Turnout		10,995	81.1	−3.3
Labor hold		Swing	N/A	

=== Concord ===
1944 New South Wales state election: Concord
Party	Candidate	Votes	%	±%
Labor	Bill Carlton	9,055	44.2	−1.5
Liberal Democratic	Brice Mutton	4,279	20.9	+20.9
Democratic	Roland Murray	4,001	19.5	−21.2
Lang Labor	Gustav Truer	3,174	15.5	+15.5
Total formal votes		20,509	97.2	−0.9
Informal votes		590	2.8	+0.9
Turnout		21,099	92.8	−0.8
After distribution of preferences
Labor	Bill Carlton	11,600	56.6	
Liberal Democratic	Brice Mutton	4,693	22.9	
Democratic	Roland Murray	4,216	20.6	
Labor hold		Swing	N/A	

- Preferences were not distributed to completion.

=== Coogee ===
1944 New South Wales state election: Coogee
Party	Candidate	Votes	%	±%
Labor	Lou Cunningham	12,616	60.7	+4.7
Democratic	John Rubie	8,179	39.3	−4.7
Total formal votes		20,795	96.6	−1.7
Informal votes		726	3.4	+1.7
Turnout		21,521	90.2	−1.2
Labor hold		Swing	+4.7	

=== Cook's River ===
1944 New South Wales state election: Cook's River
Party	Candidate	Votes	%	±%
Labor	Joseph Cahill	unopposed		
Labor hold				

=== Corowa ===
1944 New South Wales state election: Corowa
Party	Candidate	Votes	%	±%
Independent	Christopher Lethbridge	4,165	36.8	−26.6
Country	Ebenezer Kendell	3,841	33.9	−2.7
Labor	Thomas McGrath	3,320	29.3	+29.3
Total formal votes		11,326	97.8	−0.4
Informal votes		253	2.2	+0.4
Turnout		11,579	88.5	+0.3
Two-candidate-preferred result
Independent	Christopher Lethbridge	6,846	60.4	−3.0
Country	Ebenezer Kendell	4,480	39.6	+3.0
Independent hold		Swing	−3.0	

=== Croydon ===
1944 New South Wales state election: Croydon
Party	Candidate	Votes	%	±%
Democratic	David Hunter	12,120	62.0	+5.0
Independent	David Knox	7,433	38.0	+38.0
Total formal votes		19,553	95.1	−2.1
Informal votes		997	4.9	+2.1
Turnout		20,550	90.8	−2.3
Democratic hold		Swing	N/A	

=== Drummoyne ===
1944 New South Wales state election: Drummoyne
Party	Candidate	Votes	%	±%
Labor	Robert Greig	8,489	43.0	−0.4
Democratic	Russell Newton	6,831	34.6	−9.9
Lang Labor	George Drummond	2,791	14.1	+14.1
Liberal Democratic	William Adkins	1,625	8.2	+8.2
Total formal votes		19,736	96.7	−1.6
Informal votes		668	3.3	+1.6
Turnout		20,404	93.6	−0.2
Two-party-preferred result
Labor	Robert Greig	11,493	58.2	+4.8
Democratic	Russell Newton	8,243	41.8	−4.8
Labor hold		Swing	+4.8	

=== Dubbo ===
1944 New South Wales state election: Dubbo
Party	Candidate	Votes	%	±%
Labor	Clarrie Robertson	7,268	57.5	+19.7
Country	Leslie Clark	3,732	29.5	−18.6
Country	Ernest Hoy	1,649	13.0	+13.0
Total formal votes		12,649	98.3	−0.3
Informal votes		221	1.7	+0.3
Turnout		12,870	90.1	−2.9
Labor gain from Country		Swing	N/A	

- Preferences were not distributed.
- Clarrie Robertson had won the seat for Labor at the 1942 Dubbo by-election, and retained it at this election.

=== Dulwich Hill ===
1944 New South Wales state election: Dulwich Hill
Party	Candidate	Votes	%	±%
Labor	George Weir	8,959	44.3	−12.6
Democratic	Sidney Turner	6,297	31.1	−12.0
Lang Labor	Henry Ritchie	3,181	15.7	+15.7
Independent	John Laxton	1,798	8.9	+8.9
Total formal votes		20,235	97.0	−1.2
Informal votes		625	3.0	+1.2
Turnout		20,860	92.8	−0.7
Two-party-preferred result
Labor	George Weir	11,408	56.4	−0.5
Democratic	Sidney Turner	8,827	43.6	+0.5
Labor hold		Swing	−0.5	

=== Georges River ===
1944 New South Wales state election: Georges River
Party	Candidate	Votes	%	±%
Labor	Arthur Williams	14,582	62.0	+4.5
Democratic	Hedley Mallard	8,953	38.0	−4.5
Total formal votes		23,535	96.5	−1.7
Informal votes		843	3.5	+1.7
Turnout		24,378	92.2	−1.9
Labor hold		Swing	+4.5	

=== Gloucester ===
1944 New South Wales state election: Gloucester
Party	Candidate	Votes	%	±%
Independent	Ray Fitzgerald	5,194	41.0	+16.5
Democratic	Harold Young	4,805	37.9	+4.8
Country	Charles Bennett	2,665	21.0	+21.0
Total formal votes		12,664	98.2	−0.9
Informal votes		124	0.9	+0.9
Turnout		12,894	92.6	−2.3
Two-candidate-preferred result
Independent	Ray Fitzgerald	6,362	50.2	−1.3
Democratic	Harold Young	6,302	49.8	+1.3
Independent hold		Swing	−1.3	

=== Gordon ===
1944 New South Wales state election: Gordon
Party	Candidate	Votes	%	±%
Democratic	Harry Turner	15,076	71.6	
Liberal Democratic	Kenneth Lorimer	5,972	28.4	
Total formal votes		21,048	97.0	
Informal votes		658	3.0	
Turnout		21,706	92.8	
Democratic hold		Swing	N/A	

=== Goulburn ===
1944 New South Wales state election: Goulburn
Party	Candidate	Votes	%	±%
Labor	Jack Tully	unopposed		
Labor hold				

=== Granville ===
1944 New South Wales state election: Granville
Party	Candidate	Votes	%	±%
Labor	Bill Lamb	14,437	73.8	+5.9
Lang Labor	Wilfred O'Neill	5,135	26.2	+26.2
Total formal votes		19,572	95.0	−3.5
Informal votes		1,022	5.0	+3.5
Turnout		20,594	93.2	−0.7
Labor hold		Swing	N/A	

=== Hamilton ===
1944 New South Wales state election: Hamilton
Party	Candidate	Votes	%	±%
Labor	Joshua Arthur	16,562	76.8	−8.1
Lang Labor	William Campbell	5,017	23.2	+23.2
Total formal votes		21,579	95.5	−1.2
Informal votes		1,007	4.5	+1.2
Turnout		22,586	92.1	−2.0
Labor hold		Swing	N/A	

=== Hartley ===
1944 New South Wales state election: Hartley
Party	Candidate	Votes	%	±%
Labor	Hamilton Knight	unopposed		
Labor hold				

=== Hawkesbury ===
1944 New South Wales state election: Hawkesbury
Party	Candidate	Votes	%	±%
Labor	Frank Finnan	9,195	58.7	+15.7
Democratic	George Ardill	3,599	23.0	−15.1
Country	Ernest Batchelor	2,874	18.3	+18.3
Total formal votes		15,668	98.4	−0.3
Informal votes		256	1.6	+0.3
Turnout		15,924	90.9	−2.0
Labor hold		Swing	N/A	

- Preferences were not distributed.

=== Hornsby ===
1944 New South Wales state election: Hornsby
Party	Candidate	Votes	%	±%
Independent	Sydney Storey	9,885	49.9	+10.8
Democratic	Howard Beale	7,815	39.5	−1.2
Lang Labor	James Mahony	2,102	10.6	+10.6
Total formal votes		19,802	96.2	+0.8
Informal votes		781	3.8	−0.8
Turnout		20,583	89.3	−1.4
Two-candidate-preferred result
Independent	Sydney Storey	11,347	57.3	+7.2
Democratic	Howard Beale	8,455	42.7	−7.2
Independent hold		Swing	+7.2	

=== Hurstville ===
1944 New South Wales state election: Hurstville
Party	Candidate	Votes	%	±%
Labor	Clive Evatt	15,663	66.6	−1.1
Democratic	Percy Macpherson	7,846	33.4	+1.1
Total formal votes		23,509	96.6	−1.8
Informal votes		824	3.4	+1.8
Turnout		24,333	94.7	−0.4
Labor hold		Swing	−1.1	

=== Illawarra ===
1944 New South Wales state election: Illawarra
Party	Candidate	Votes	%	±%
Labor	Howard Fowles	8,090	61.4	+5.0
Democratic	John Hedge	2,346	17.8	−25.8
Country	Edward Spensley	2,132	16.2	+16.2
Independent Labor	Ronald Sarina	619	4.7	+4.7
Total formal votes		13,187	97.7	−0.4
Informal votes		307	2.3	+0.4
Turnout		13,494	91.5	−1.6
Labor hold		Swing	N/A	

- Preferences were not distributed.

=== King ===
1944 New South Wales state election: King
Party	Candidate	Votes	%	±%
Labor	Daniel Clyne	9,647	54.1	−8.9
Lang Labor	Horace Foley	8,175	45.9	+45.9
Total formal votes		17,822	93.6	−0.3
Informal votes		1,218	6.4	+0.3
Turnout		19,040	84.9	−0.3
Labor hold		Swing	N/A	

=== Kogarah ===
1944 New South Wales state election: Kogarah
Party	Candidate	Votes	%	±%
Labor	William Currey	13,532	60.7	+11.9
Democratic	Robert Henderson	6,464	29.0	−15.6
Liberal Democratic	Thomas Claydon	2,306	10.3	+10.3
Total formal votes		22,302	97.0	−1.6
Informal votes		683	3.0	+1.6
Turnout		22,985	93.0	−1.5
Labor hold		Swing	N/A	

- Preferences were not distributed.

=== Kurri Kurri ===
1944 New South Wales state election: Kurri Kurri
Party	Candidate	Votes	%	±%
Labor	George Booth	unopposed		
Labor hold				

=== Lachlan ===
1944 New South Wales state election: Lachlan
Party	Candidate	Votes	%	±%
Labor	John Chanter	7,525	73.0	+26.9
Independent Labor	Joseph Sligar	2,780	27.0	+27.0
Total formal votes		10,305	93.5	−5.2
Informal votes		719	6.5	+5.2
Turnout		11,024	89.2	−2.9
Labor gain from Country		Swing	N/A	

- John Chanter had won the seat for Labor at the 1943 Lachlan by-election, and retained it at this election.

=== Lakemba ===
1944 New South Wales state election: Lakemba
Party	Candidate	Votes	%	±%
Labor	Fred Stanley	9,281	42.1	−29.0
Communist	Adam Ogston	4,668	21.3	+21.3
Democratic	William Crook	4,200	19.2	+19.2
Lang Labor	Henry Mulcahy	3,798	17.4	+17.4
Total formal votes		21,884	97.3	+1.5
Informal votes		600	2.7	−1.5
Turnout		22,484	93.5	−0.4
After distribution of preferences
Labor	Fred Stanley	11,857	54.2	
Communist	Adam Ogston	5,337	24.4	
Democratic	William Crook	4,690	21.4	
Labor hold		Swing	N/A	

- Preferences were not distributed to completion.

=== Lane Cove ===
1944 New South Wales state election: Lane Cove
Party	Candidate	Votes	%	±%
Labor	Henry Woodward	9,521	44.4	−2.3
Democratic	John Cramer	5,641	26.3	−20.5
Liberal Democratic	Norman Thomas	4,122	19.2	+19.2
Independent	George Holloway	2,168	10.1	+10.1
Total formal votes		21,451	97.2	−1.1
Informal votes		617	2.8	+1.1
Turnout		21,452	93.3	−0.2
Two-party-preferred result
Labor	Henry Woodward	11,143	51.9	+2.8
Democratic	John Cramer	10,309	48.1	−2.8
Labor gain from Democratic		Swing	+2.8	

=== Leichhardt ===
1944 New South Wales state election: Leichhardt
Party	Candidate	Votes	%	±%
Labor	Claude Matthews	13,584	72.6	−10.5
Independent Labor	Francis Edgcumbe	2,731	14.6	+14.6
Independent Labor	Charles Shields	2,400	12.8	+12.8
Total formal votes		18,715	94.1	+0.5
Informal votes		1,165	5.9	−0.5
Turnout		19,880	92.4	−0.1
Labor hold		Swing	N/A	

- Preferences were not distributed.

=== Lismore ===
1944 New South Wales state election: Lismore
Party	Candidate	Votes	%	±%
Country	William Frith	8,025	59.5	+19.3
Lang Labor	Warren Oakes	5,469	40.5	+40.5
Total formal votes		13,494	98.3	−0.8
Informal votes		232	1.7	+0.8
Turnout		13,726	89.3	−4.2
Country hold		Swing	N/A	

=== Liverpool Plains ===
1944 New South Wales state election: Liverpool Plains
Party	Candidate	Votes	%	±%
Labor	Roger Nott	6,715	58.7	+8.1
Country	James Scott	4,726	41.3	+24.2
Total formal votes		11,441	98.5	+0.4
Informal votes		170	1.5	−0.4
Turnout		11,611	89.9	−3.4
Labor hold		Swing	N/A	

=== Maitland ===
1944 New South Wales state election: Maitland
Party	Candidate	Votes	%	±%
Democratic	Walter Howarth	7,626	54.9	+4.4
Labor	William Lindsay	6,275	45.1	−4.4
Total formal votes		13,901	98.5	−0.2
Informal votes		211	1.5	+0.2
Turnout		14,112	93.4	−2.6
Democratic hold		Swing	+4.4	

=== Manly ===
1944 New South Wales state election: Manly
Party	Candidate	Votes	%	±%
Labor	James Dunn	8,286	36.6	+2.5
Independent Democrat	Alfred Reid	7,561	33.4	+33.4
Democratic	Stephen Slack	5,246	23.2	−24.7
Liberal Democratic	Eric White	1,556	6.9	+6.9
Total formal votes		22,649	97.1	−1.1
Informal votes		670	2.9	+1.1
Turnout		23,319	91.0	+0.6
Two-candidate-preferred result
Independent Democrat	Alfred Reid	12,962	57.2	+57.2
Labor	James Dunn	9,687	42.8	+2.7
Member changed to Independent Democrat from United Australia		Swing	N/A	

- Alfred Reid had been elected at the previous election as a UAP member, however he was not pre-selected by the Democratic Party and held the seat as an Independent Democratic candidate.

=== Marrickville ===
1944 New South Wales state election: Marrickville
Party	Candidate	Votes	%	±%
Labor	Carlo Lazzarini	unopposed		
Labor hold				

=== Monaro ===
1944 New South Wales state election: Monaro
Party	Candidate	Votes	%	±%
Labor	John Seiffert	unopposed		
Labor hold				

=== Mosman ===
1944 New South Wales state election: Mosman
Party	Candidate	Votes	%	±%
Independent	Donald Macdonald	12,973	62.2	+2.8
Democratic	Frank Pursell	5,157	24.7	−1.1
Liberal Democratic	William Mason	2,741	13.1	+13.1
Total formal votes		20,871	97.2	−1.7
Informal votes		601	2.8	+1.7
Turnout		21,472	91.3	−1.0
Independent hold		Swing	N/A	

- Preferences were not distributed.

=== Mudgee ===
1944 New South Wales state election: Mudgee
Party	Candidate	Votes	%	±%
Labor	Bill Dunn	6,967	63.0	−6.4
Independent	Frederick Cooke	3,304	29.9	−0.7
Independent	Kevin Nott	788	7.1	+7.1
Total formal votes		11,059	98.1	−0.8
Informal votes		209	1.9	+0.8
Turnout		11,268	91.3	−2.9
Labor hold		Swing	N/A	

- Preferences were not distributed.

=== Murray ===
1944 New South Wales state election: Murray
Party	Candidate	Votes	%	±%
Country	Joe Lawson	6,053	57.1	+3.3
Labor	James Flood	4,540	42.9	−3.3
Total formal votes		10,593	98.1	−0.6
Informal votes		205	1.9	+0.6
Turnout		10,798	88.9	+5.6
Country hold		Swing	+3.3	

=== Murrumbidgee ===
1944 New South Wales state election: Murrumbidgee
Party	Candidate	Votes	%	±%
Labor	George Enticknap	8,573	67.0	+40.4
Country	Alan Malcolm	4,230	33.0	+10.6
Total formal votes		12,803	97.1	+0.5
Informal votes		388	2.9	−0.5
Turnout		13,191	89.5	−0.2
Member changed to Labor from Independent Labor		Swing	N/A	

- Ambrose Enticknap was the sitting MP for Murrumbidgee, who won the previous election as an Independent Labor candidate.

=== Namoi ===
1944 New South Wales state election: Namoi
Party	Candidate	Votes	%	±%
Labor	Raymond Hamilton	7,036	59.6	+26.6
Country	Lancelot Thomas	4,762	40.4	+7.7
Total formal votes		11,798	98.4	+0.1
Informal votes		194	1.6	−0.1
Turnout		11,992	87.6	−5.5
Labor hold		Swing	+6.9	

=== Nepean ===
1944 New South Wales state election: Nepean
Party	Candidate	Votes	%	±%
Labor	John Jackson	6,394	41.4	−2.2
Independent Democrat	Joseph Jackson	5,622	36.4	+36.4
Democratic	Allan Taylor	3,427	22.2	−33.2
Total formal votes		15,443	97.5	−0.6
Informal votes		399	2.5	+0.6
Turnout		15,842	89.5	−3.0
Two-candidate-preferred result
Independent Democrat	Joseph Jackson	8,494	55.0	+55.0
Labor	John Jackson	6,949	45.0	+1.4
Member changed to Independent Democrat from United Australia		Swing	N/A	

- Joseph Jackson was the sitting MP for Nepean, who won the previous election as a United Australia candidate.

=== Neutral Bay ===
1944 New South Wales state election: Neutral Bay
Party	Candidate	Votes	%	±%
Democratic	Reginald Weaver	12,700	56.9	−43.1
Labor	George Manuel	6,334	28.4	+28.4
Liberal Democratic	James Rolle	3,285	14.7	+14.7
Total formal votes		22,319	97.6	
Informal votes		538	2.4	
Turnout		22,857	90.5	
Democratic hold		Swing	N/A	

- Preferences were not distributed.

=== Newcastle ===
1944 New South Wales state election: Newcastle
Party	Candidate	Votes	%	±%
Labor	Frank Hawkins	17,673	81.5	+6.7
Lang Labor	Thomas Malone	4,021	18.5	+18.5
Total formal votes		21,694	94.9	−2.9
Informal votes		1,167	5.1	+2.9
Turnout		22,861	91.5	−1.3
Labor hold		Swing	N/A	

=== Newtown ===
1944 New South Wales state election: Newtown
Party	Candidate	Votes	%	±%
Lang Labor	Lilian Fowler	9,989	55.6	+55.6
Labor	Frank Burke	7,987	44.4	−7.2
Total formal votes		17,976	96.0	−0.6
Informal votes		753	4.0	+0.6
Turnout		18,729	91.7	−0.1
Lang Labor gain from Labor		Swing	N/A	

=== North Sydney ===
1944 New South Wales state election: North Sydney
Party	Candidate	Votes	%	±%
Labor	James Geraghty	9,844	45.7	+1.7
Democratic	William Harding	7,358	34.2	−9.9
Lang Labor	Ainslie Beecraft	3,095	14.4	+14.4
Liberal Democratic	Ebenezer Minnis	1,244	5.8	+5.8
Total formal votes		21,541	96.5	−1.6
Informal votes		782	3.5	+1.6
Turnout		22,323	94.6	+2.6
Two-party-preferred result
Labor	James Geraghty	12,333	57.3	+3.4
Democratic	William Harding	9,208	42.7	−3.4
Labor hold		Swing	+3.4	

=== Orange ===
1944 New South Wales state election: Orange
Party	Candidate	Votes	%	±%
Labor	Bob O'Halloran	7,524	51.2	+5.5
Country	John Caldwell	7,162	48.8	+48.8
Total formal votes		14,686	97.5	0.0
Informal votes		381	2.5	0.0
Turnout		15,067	91.1	−3.4
Labor hold		Swing	−3.1	

=== Oxley ===
1944 New South Wales state election: Oxley
Party	Candidate	Votes	%	±%
Independent	George Mitchell	5,006	36.0	−18.3
Independent Country	Les Jordan	4,381	31.5	+31.5
Independent Country	Charles Ryan	1,659	11.9	+11.9
Independent Labor	Edward Baxter	1,399	10.1	+10.1
Australia's Labor Movement	William McCristal	844	6.1	+6.1
Independent Country	Samuel Martin	630	4.5	+4.5
Total formal votes		13,919	96.0	−2.8
Informal votes		585	4.0	+2.8
Turnout		14,504	94.6	−0.2
Two-candidate-preferred result
Independent Country	Les Jordan	7,197	51.7	+51.7
Independent	George Mitchell	6,722	48.3	−6.0
Independent Country gain from Independent		Swing	N/A	

=== Paddington ===
1944 New South Wales state election: Paddington
Party	Candidate	Votes	%	±%
Labor	Maurice O'Sullivan	unopposed		
Labor hold				

=== Parramatta ===
1944 New South Wales state election: Parramatta
Party	Candidate	Votes	%	±%
Democratic	George Gollan	9,998	47.6	−6.3
Labor	Arthur Treble	9,561	45.5	−0.7
Independent	William Long	1,458	6.9	+6.9
Total formal votes		21,017	97.5	0.0
Informal votes		527	2.5	0.0
Turnout		21,544	92.5	−1.1
Two-party-preferred result
Democratic	George Gollan	10,677	50.8	−3.0
Labor	Arthur Treble	13,340	49.2	+3.0
Democratic hold		Swing	−3.0	

=== Phillip ===
1944 New South Wales state election: Phillip
Party	Candidate	Votes	%	±%
Labor	Tom Shannon	10,198	59.3	−14.0
Lang Labor	Les Dorney	7,008	40.7	+40.7
Total formal votes		17,206	94.6	−0.6
Informal votes		988	5.4	+0.6
Turnout		18,194	88.6	+1.0
Labor hold		Swing	N/A	

=== Raleigh ===
1944 New South Wales state election: Raleigh
Party	Candidate	Votes	%	±%
Country	Roy Vincent	8,948	62.1	+24.1
Labor	Norman Long	5,453	37.9	+2.0
Total formal votes		14,401	98.0	−0.5
Informal votes		290	2.0	+0.5
Turnout		14,691	94.1	+0.5
Country hold		Swing	+5.5	

=== Randwick ===
1944 New South Wales state election: Randwick
Party	Candidate	Votes	%	±%
Labor	William Gollan	12,592	59.0	+8.0
Democratic	Bertram Butcher	6,060	28.4	−12.9
Liberal Democratic	Arnold Baker	2,693	12.6	+12.6
Total formal votes		21,345	96.2	−2.2
Informal votes		846	3.8	+2.2
Turnout		22,191	93.1	+0.6
Labor hold		Swing	N/A	

- Preferences were not distributed.

=== Redfern ===
1944 New South Wales state election: Redfern
Party	Candidate	Votes	%	±%
Labor	William McKell	11,299	60.9	−16.4
Lang Labor	Patrick Tyrrell	7,246	39.1	+39.1
Total formal votes		18,545	96.4	+0.3
Informal votes		688	3.6	−0.3
Turnout		19,233	91.9	−0.8
Labor hold		Swing	N/A	

=== Rockdale ===
1944 New South Wales state election: Rockdale
Party	Candidate	Votes	%	±%
Labor	John McGrath	11,419	56.1	+0.5
Liberal Democratic	Enoch Jones	6,531	32.1	+32.1
Democratic	Henry Miller	2,184	10.7	−27.5
Independent	Thomas Whitehouse	227	1.1	+1.1
Total formal votes		20,361	96.5	−1.2
Informal votes		729	3.5	+1.2
Turnout		21,090	93.7	+0.3
Labor hold		Swing	N/A	

- Preferences were not distributed.

=== Ryde ===
1944 New South Wales state election: Ryde
Party	Candidate	Votes	%	±%
Independent Democrat	James Shand	6,151	28.4	−18.1
Labor	Joseph Griffiths	5,645	26.1	+26.1
Democratic	Leslie Billington	4,103	19.0	−7.5
Liberal Democratic	Ernest Mead	3,039	14.0	+14.0
Lang Labor	Frederick Burke	2,409	11.1	+11.1
Independent	Howard Miscamble	292	1.4	+0.1
Total formal votes		21,639	96.1	−1.8
Informal votes		880	3.9	+1.8
Turnout		22,519	92.4	−0.9
Two-candidate-preferred result
Independent Democrat	James Shand	12,873	59.5	−9.5
Labor	Joseph Griffiths	8,766	40.5	+40.5
Independent Democrat hold		Swing	N/A	

=== South Coast ===
1944 New South Wales state election: South Coast
Party	Candidate	Votes	%	±%
Independent	Jack Beale	6,600	55.8	+5.6
Independent Labor	Herb Turner	2,138	18.1	+18.1
Democratic	Charles Woodhill	1,779	15.0	−34.8
Independent	Percy Treasure	1,313	11.1	+11.1
Total formal votes		11,830	98.3	−0.2
Informal votes		200	1.7	+0.2
Turnout		12,030	90.3	−2.5
Independent hold		Swing	N/A	

- Preferences were not distributed.

=== Sturt ===
1944 New South Wales state election: Sturt
Party	Candidate	Votes	%	±%
Labor	Ted Horsington	unopposed		
Labor hold				

=== Tamworth ===
1944 New South Wales state election: Tamworth
Party	Candidate	Votes	%	±%
Independent	Bill Chaffey	unopposed		
Independent hold				

=== Temora ===
1944 New South Wales state election: Temora
Party	Candidate	Votes	%	±%
Country	Doug Dickson	6,658	52.1	−1.2
Labor	Laurie Tully	5,788	45.3	−1.4
Independent Labor	James King	339	2.6	+2.6
Total formal votes		12,785	97.9	−0.2
Informal votes		268	2.1	+0.2
Turnout		13,053	90.7	−2.0
Country hold		Swing	N/A	

- Preferences were not distributed.

=== Tenterfield ===
1944 New South Wales state election: Tenterfield
Party	Candidate	Votes	%	±%
Country	Michael Bruxner	8,613	67.7	+10.8
Independent	Edward Ogilvie	4,103	32.3	+32.3
Total formal votes		12,716	97.5	−0.7
Informal votes		329	2.5	+0.7
Turnout		13,045	87.0	−5.1
Country hold		Swing	N/A	

=== Upper Hunter ===
1944 New South Wales state election: Upper Hunter
Party	Candidate	Votes	%	±%
Country	D'Arcy Rose	7,506	57.6	+1.6
Labor	Walter Geraghty	5,528	42.4	−1.6
Total formal votes		13,034	98.0	−0.6
Informal votes		267	2.0	+0.6
Turnout		13,301	91.0	−3.4
Country hold		Swing	+1.6	

=== Vaucluse ===
1944 New South Wales state election: Vaucluse
Party	Candidate	Votes	%	±%
Democratic	Murray Robson	unopposed		
Democratic hold				

=== Wagga Wagga ===
1944 New South Wales state election: Wagga Wagga
Party	Candidate	Votes	%	±%
Labor	Eddie Graham	9,287	68.0	+18.3
Country	John McInnes	4,375	32.0	−10.8
Total formal votes		13,662	98.7	−0.1
Informal votes		182	1.3	+0.1
Turnout		13,844	89.9	−2.8
Labor hold		Swing	+14.2	

=== Waratah ===
1944 New South Wales state election: Waratah
Party	Candidate	Votes	%	±%
Labor	Robert Cameron	15,121	65.8	−20.7
Communist	Stan Deacon	5,102	22.2	+22.2
Lang Labor	Leonard Sweeney	2,760	12.0	+12.0
Total formal votes		22,983	97.4	+0.1
Informal votes		618	2.6	−0.1
Turnout		23,601	92.9	−2.2
Labor hold		Swing	N/A	

- Preferences were not distributed.

=== Waverley ===
1944 New South Wales state election: Waverley
Party	Candidate	Votes	%	±%
Labor	Clarrie Martin	unopposed		
Labor hold				

=== Willoughby ===
1944 New South Wales state election: Willoughby
Party	Candidate	Votes	%	±%
Democratic	George Brain	9,836	47.0	−12.8
Labor	Leo Haylen	8,365	40.0	−0.2
Liberal Democratic	Harrold Woodman	2,731	13.0	+13.0
Total formal votes		20,932	97.7	−0.5
Informal votes		487	2.3	+0.5
Turnout		21,419	94.0	+1.3
Two-party-preferred result
Democratic	George Brain	11,773	56.2	−3.8
Labor	Leo Haylen	9,159	43.8	+3.8
Democratic hold		Swing	−3.8	

=== Wollondilly ===
1944 New South Wales state election: Wollondilly
Party	Candidate	Votes	%	±%
Democratic	Jeff Bate	8,305	65.5	−34.5
Independent Labor	Patrick Kenna	2,432	19.2	+19.2
Liberal Democratic	Gerald Wylie	1,934	15.3	+15.3
Total formal votes		12,671	96.9	
Informal votes		403	3.1	
Turnout		13,074	88.4	
Democratic hold		Swing	N/A	

=== Wollongong-Kembla ===
1944 New South Wales state election: Wollongong-Kembla
Party	Candidate	Votes	%	±%
Labor	Billy Davies	unopposed		
Labor hold				

=== Woollahra ===
1944 New South Wales state election: Woollahra
Party	Candidate	Votes	%	±%
Democratic	Vernon Treatt	12,173	50.5	−17.2
Independent	Reg Bartley	7,248	30.1	+30.1
Independent Labor	Norman Jackson	4,682	19.4	+19.4
Total formal votes		24,103	96.7	−0.6
Informal votes		824	3.3	+0.6
Turnout		24,927	89.8	+3.7
Democratic hold		Swing	N/A	

- Preferences were not distributed.

=== Yass ===
1944 New South Wales state election: Yass
Party	Candidate	Votes	%	±%
Labor	Bill Sheahan	unopposed		
Labor hold				

=== Young ===
1944 New South Wales state election: Young
Party	Candidate	Votes	%	±%
Labor	Fred Cahill	7,758	58.1	+25.9
Country	Valentine Bragg	5,607	41.9	−4.3
Total formal votes		13,365	98.4	−0.9
Informal votes		210	1.6	+0.9
Turnout		13,575	91.0	−3.7
Labor hold		Swing	+5.8	

== See also ==
- Candidates of the 1944 New South Wales state election
- Members of the New South Wales Legislative Assembly, 1944–1947
