= Candidates of the 1944 New South Wales state election =

This is a list of candidates of the 1944 New South Wales state election. The election was held on 27 May 1944.

== Retiring members ==
=== Democratic ===
- Herbert FitzSimons (Lane Cove)

=== Country ===
- Arthur Budd (Byron)

== Legislative Assembly ==
Sitting members are shown in bold text. Successful candidates are highlighted in the relevant colour.

Electorate	Held by	Labor candidate	Coalition candidate	Other candidates
Albury	Democratic	John King	**Alexander Mair** (Dem)	
Annandale	Labor	**Bob Gorman**		Arthur Hagen (Ind); Ross Pryor (LL)
Armidale	Country	Herbert Oxford	**David Drummond** (CP)	
Ashburnham	Labor	**Edgar Dring**	Charles McCarron (CP)	
Ashfield	Democratic	William Bodkin	**Athol Richardson** (Dem)	
Auburn	Labor	Patrick Mooney		**Jack Lang** (LL)
Balmain	Labor	**Mary Quirk**	Malinda Ivey (Dem)	Stan Moran (CPA)
Bankstown	Labor	**James McGirr**		Stephen Roberts (LL)
Barwon	Labor	**Roy Heferen**		Ben Wade (Ind)
Bathurst	Labor	**Gus Kelly**	Archibald Gardiner (CP)	
Blacktown	Labor	**Frank Hill**	Francis Izon (Dem)	William Morgan (LL); Lucy Steel (LL); Ray Watson (Ind)
Bondi	Labor	**Abe Landa**	Frank Browne (Dem)	Leslie Hallett (LL); Alfred Rosen (NOLP); Allan Stewart (LDP)
Botany	Labor	**Bob Heffron**		
Bulli	Labor	**John Sweeney**		Lawrence Baines (Ind Lab); John Martin (CPA); Maurice Twomey (Ind Lab)
Burwood	Democratic	Cliff Mallam	**Gordon Jackett** (Dem)	Stanley Coulton (CPA); Keith Sutherland (LDP)
Byron	Country	Arthur Dodd	Stanley Stephens (CP)	John Regan (Ind Lab)
Byron	Country	Arthur Dodd	Alick Buckley (CP); Frederick Stuart (CP)	John Regan (Ind Lab)
Canterbury	Labor	**Arthur Tonge**		Claude Allen (LL)
Casino	Country	Denis Holmes	**John Reid** (CP)	
Castlereagh	Labor	**Jack Renshaw**	Alfred Yeo (CP)	
Cessnock	Labor	**Jack Baddeley**		
Clarence	Country		**Cecil Wingfield** (CP)	
Cobar	Labor	**Mat Davidson**		William Burgess (LL)
Concord	Labor	**Bill Carlton**	Roland Murray (Dem)	Brice Mutton (LDP); Gustav Truer (LL)
Coogee	Labor	**Lou Cunningham**	John Rubie (Dem)	
Cook's River	Labor	**Joseph Cahill**		
Corowa	Independent	Thomas McGrath	Ebenezer Kendell (CP)	**Christopher Lethbridge** (Ind)
Croydon	Democratic		**David Hunter** (Dem)	David Knox (Ind)
Drummoyne	Labor	**Robert Greig**	Russell Newton (Dem)	William Adkins (LDP); George Drummond (LL)
Dubbo	Labor	**Clarrie Robertson**	Leslie Clark (CP); Ernest Hoy (CP)	
Dulwich Hill	Labor	**George Weir**	Sidney Turner (Dem)	John Laxton (Ind); Henry Ritchie (LL)
Georges River	Labor	**Arthur Williams**	Hedley Mallard (Dem)	
Gloucester	Independent		Charles Bennett (CP); Harold Young (Dem)	**Ray Fitzgerald** (Ind)
Gordon	Democratic		**Harry Turner** (Dem)	Kenneth Lorimer (LDP)
Goulburn	Labor	**Jack Tully**		
Granville	Labor	**Bill Lamb**		Wilfred O'Neill (LL)
Hamilton	Labor	**Joshua Arthur**		William Campbell (LL)
Hartley	Labor	**Hamilton Knight**		
Hawkesbury	Labor	**Frank Finnan**	George Ardill (Dem); Ernest Batchelor (CP)	
Hornsby	Ind Democrat		Howard Beale (Dem)	**Sydney Storey** (Ind Dem)
Hornsby	Ind Democrat		Howard Beale (Dem)	James Mahony (LL)
Hurstville	Labor	**Clive Evatt**	Percy Macpherson (Dem)	
Illawarra	Labor	**Howard Fowles**	John Hedge (Dem); Edward Spensley (CP)	Ronald Sarina (Ind)
King	Labor	**Daniel Clyne**		Horace Foley (LL)
Kogarah	Labor	**William Currey**	Robert Henderson (Dem)	Thomas Claydon (LDP)
Kurri Kurri	Labor	**George Booth**		
Lachlan	Country	**John Chanter**		Joseph Sligar (Ind Lab)
Lakemba	Labor	**Fred Stanley**	William Crook (Dem)	Henry Mulcahy (LL); Adam Ogston (CPA)
Lane Cove	Democratic	Henry Woodward	John Cramer (Dem)	George Holloway (Ind); Norman Thomas (LDP)
Leichhardt	Labor	**Claude Matthews**		Francis Edgcumbe (Ind Lab); Charles Shields (Ind Lab)
Lismore	Country		**William Frith** (CP)	Warren Oakes (LL)
Liverpool Plains	Labor	**Roger Nott**	James Scott (CP)	
Maitland	Democratic	William Lindsay	**Walter Howarth** (Dem)	
Manly	Democratic	James Dunn	Stephen Stack (Dem)	**Alfred Reid** (Ind Dem)
Manly	Democratic	James Dunn	Stephen Stack (Dem)	Eric White (LDP)
Marrickville	Labor	**Carlo Lazzarini**		
Monaro	Labor	**John Seiffert**		
Mosman	Independent		Frank Pursell (Dem)	**Donald Macdonald** (Ind)
Mosman	Independent		Frank Pursell (Dem)	William Mason (LDP)
Mudgee	Labor	**Bill Dunn**		Frederick Cooke (Ind); Kevin Nott (Ind)
Murray	Country	James Flood	**Joe Lawson** (CP)	
Murrumbidgee	Ind Labor	**George Enticknap**	Alan Malcolm (CP)	
Namoi	Labor	**Raymond Hamilton**	Lancelot Thomas (CP)	
Nepean	Ind Democrat	John Jackson	Allan Taylor (Dem)	**Joseph Jackson** (Ind Dem)
Neutral Bay	Democratic	George Manuel	**Reginald Weaver** (Dem)	James Rolle (LDP)
Newcastle	Labor	**Frank Hawkins**		Thomas Malone (LL)
Newtown	Labor	**Frank Burke**		Lilian Fowler (LL)
North Sydney	Labor	**James Geraghty**	William Harding (Dem)	Ainslie Beecraft (LL); Ebenezer Minnis (LDP)
Orange	Labor	**Bob O'Halloran**	John Caldwell (CP)	
Oxley	Independent			Les Jordan (Ind CP)
Oxley	Independent			Edward Baxter (Ind Lab); Samuel Martin (Ind CP); William McCristal (ALM); **George Mitchell** (Ind); Charles Ryan (Ind CP)
Paddington	Labor	**Maurice O'Sullivan**		
Parramatta	Democratic	Arthur Treble	**George Gollan** (Dem)	William Long (Ind)
Phillip	Labor	**Tom Shannon**		Les Dorney (LL)
Raleigh	Country	Norman Long	**Roy Vincent** (CP)	
Randwick	Labor	**William Gollan**	Bertram Butcher (Dem)	Arnold Barker (LDP)
Redfern	Labor	**William McKell**		Patrick Tyrrell (LL)
Rockdale	Labor	**John McGrath**	Henry Miller (Dem)	Enoch Jones (LDP); Thomas Whitehouse (Ind)
Ryde	Ind Democrat	Joseph Griffiths	Leslie Billington (Dem)	**James Shand** (Ind Dem)
Ryde	Ind Democrat	Joseph Griffiths	Leslie Billington (Dem)	Frederick Burke (LL); Ernest Mead (LDP); Howard Miscamble (Ind)
South Coast	Independent		Charles Woodhill (Dem)	**Jack Beale** (Ind)
South Coast	Independent		Charles Woodhill (Dem)	Percy Treasure (Ind Dem); Herb Turner (Ind Lab)
Sturt	Labor	**Ted Horsington**		
Tamworth	Independent			**Bill Chaffey** (Ind)
Temora	Country	Laurie Tully	**Doug Dickson** (CP)	James King (Ind Lab)
Tenterfield	Country		**Michael Bruxner** (CP)	Edward Ogilvie (Ind)
Upper Hunter	Country	Walter Geraghty	**D'Arcy Rose** (CP)	
Vaucluse	Democratic		**Murray Robson** (Dem)	
Wagga Wagga	Labor	**Eddie Graham**	John McInnes (CP)	
Waratah	Labor	**Robert Cameron**		Stan Deacon (CPA); Leonard Sweeney (LL)
Waverley	Labor	**Clarrie Martin**		
Willoughby	Democratic	Leo Haylen	**George Brain** (Dem)	Harrold Woodman (LDP)
Wollondilly	Democratic		**Jeff Bate** (Dem)	Patrick Kenna (Ind Lab); Gerald Wylie (LDP)
Wollongong-Kembla	Labor	**Billy Davies**		
Woollahra	Democratic		**Vernon Treatt** (Dem)	Reg Bartley (Ind); Norman Jackson (Ind Lab)
Yass	Labor	**Bill Sheahan**		
Young	Labor	**Fred Cahill**	Valentine Bragg (CP)	

== See also ==
- Results of the 1944 New South Wales state election
- Members of the New South Wales Legislative Assembly, 1944–1947
