= Electoral results for the district of Neutral Bay =

Election results for Neutral Bay, New South Wales, Australia

Neutral Bay, an electoral district of the Legislative Assembly in the Australian state of New South Wales, was created in 1927 and abolished in 1962.

Election	Member	Party
1927	Reginald Weaver	Nationalist
1930	Reginald Weaver	Nationalist
1931	Reginald Weaver	United Australia
1932	Reginald Weaver	United Australia
1935	Reginald Weaver	United Australia
1938	Reginald Weaver	United Australia
1941	Reginald Weaver	United Australia
1944	Reginald Weaver	Democratic / Liberal
1945 by	Ivan Black	Liberal
1947	Ivan Black	Liberal
1950	Ivan Black	Liberal
1951 by	Ivan Black	Liberal
1953	Ivan Black	Liberal
1956	Ivan Black	Liberal
1959	Ivan Black	Liberal

== Election results ==
=== Elections in the 1950s ===
==== 1959 ====
1959 New South Wales state election: Neutral Bay
Party	Candidate	Votes	%	±%
Liberal	Ivan Black	unopposed		
Liberal hold				

==== 1956 ====
1956 New South Wales state election: Neutral Bay
Party	Candidate	Votes	%	±%
Liberal	Ivan Black	15,585	74.9	−25.1
Labor	Donald Gray	5,228	25.1	+25.1
Total formal votes		20,813	98.4	
Informal votes		330	1.6	
Turnout		21,143	91.6	
Liberal hold		Swing	N/A	

==== 1953 ====
1953 New South Wales state election: Neutral Bay
Party	Candidate	Votes	%	±%
Liberal	Ivan Black	unopposed		
Liberal hold				

==== 1951 by-election ====
1951 Neutral Bay by-election
Party	Candidate	Votes	%	±%
Liberal	Ivan Black	unopposed		
Liberal hold				

==== 1950 ====
1950 New South Wales state election: Neutral Bay
Party	Candidate	Votes	%	±%
Liberal	Ivan Black	13,791	72.8	
Labor	Frank McCullum	5,161	27.2	
Total formal votes		18,952	98.6	
Informal votes		264	1.4	
Turnout		19,216	91.2	
Liberal hold		Swing		

=== Elections in the 1940s ===
==== 1947 ====
1947 New South Wales state election: Neutral Bay
Party	Candidate	Votes	%	±%
Liberal	Ivan Black	17,349	72.2	+15.3
Independent	Jack Prior	6,670	27.8	+27.8
Total formal votes		24,019	98.6	+1.0
Informal votes		348	1.4	−1.0
Turnout		24,367	93.8	+3.3
Liberal hold		Swing	N/A	

==== 1945 by-election ====
1945 Neutral Bay by-election Saturday 15 December
Party	Candidate	Votes	%	±%
Liberal	Ivan Black	10,839	56.4	−0.5
Independent	Kenneth Bolton	8,393	43.6	
Total formal votes		19,232	96.7	−0.9
Informal votes		657	3.3	+0.9
Turnout		19,889	77.6	−12.9
Liberal hold		Swing	N/A	

Reginald Weaver (Liberal) died.

==== 1944 ====
1944 New South Wales state election: Neutral Bay
Party	Candidate	Votes	%	±%
Democratic	Reginald Weaver	12,700	56.9	−43.1
Labor	George Manuel	6,334	28.4	+28.4
Liberal Democratic	James Rolle	3,285	14.7	+14.7
Total formal votes		22,319	97.6	
Informal votes		538	2.4	
Turnout		22,857	90.5	
Democratic hold		Swing	N/A	

- Preferences were not distributed.

==== 1941 ====
1941 New South Wales state election: Neutral Bay
Party	Candidate	Votes	%	±%
United Australia	Reginald Weaver	unopposed		
United Australia hold				

=== Elections in the 1930s ===
==== 1938 ====
1938 New South Wales state election: Neutral Bay
Party	Candidate	Votes	%	±%
United Australia	Reginald Weaver	unopposed		
United Australia hold				

==== 1935 ====
1935 New South Wales state election: Neutral Bay
Party	Candidate	Votes	%	±%
United Australia	Reginald Weaver	13,937	88.4	+7.7
Independent	Peter Pollack	1,825	11.6	+11.6
Total formal votes		15,762	93.5	−4.8
Informal votes		1,092	6.5	+4.8
Turnout		16,854	94.2	−2.4
United Australia hold		Swing	N/A	

==== 1932 ====
1932 New South Wales state election: Neutral Bay
Party	Candidate	Votes	%	±%
United Australia	Reginald Weaver	12,845	80.7	+15.3
Labor (NSW)	William McMullen	3,072	19.3	−8.4
Total formal votes		15,917	98.3	−0.5
Informal votes		276	1.7	+0.5
Turnout		16,193	96.6	+3.4
United Australia hold		Swing	N/A	

==== 1930 ====
1930 New South Wales state election: Neutral Bay
Party	Candidate	Votes	%	±%
Nationalist	Reginald Weaver	10,401	65.4	
Labor	John Green	4,404	27.7	
Australian	Raymond Sullivan	1,095	6.9	
Total formal votes		15,900	98.8	
Informal votes		190	1.2	
Turnout		16,090	93.2	
Nationalist hold		Swing		

=== Elections in the 1920s ===
==== 1927 ====
1927 New South Wales state election: Neutral Bay
Party	Candidate	Votes	%	±%
Nationalist	Reginald Weaver	9,076	69.5	
Independent Labor	Alfred Waterhouse	2,451	18.8	
Ind. Nationalist	Frederick Aarons	1,533	11.7	
Total formal votes		13,060	98.6	
Informal votes		184	1.4	
Turnout		13,244	80.8	
Nationalist win		(new seat)		
