= Alfred Dennis =

Alfred Dennis may refer to:

- Alfred Dennis (politician), Australian politician
- Alfred Dennis (actor), American actor

== See also ==
- Alfred Dennis Sieminski, American politician
