= 1951 Neutral Bay state by-election =

Election result for Neutral Bay, New South Wales, Australia

A by-election was held for the New South Wales Legislative Assembly electorate of Neutral Bay on 2 June 1951 because of the resignation of Ivan Black (Liberal). Black wanted to contest the federal seat of Warringah as the Liberal candidate at the 1951 Australian federal election. He understood that he had to resign from the state parliament at least 14 days prior to the close of nominations, which meant he needed to resign before the Liberal party selected its candidate. He was defeated for pre-selection by Francis Bland, who went on to comfortably win the seat. Black was selected as the Liberal candidate to retain the state seat.

== Dates ==
Date	Event
20 March 1951	Ivan Black resigned.
29 March 1951	Liberal Party pre-selection for the federal seat of Warringah.
6 April 1951	Nominations closed for the Australian Federal election
28 April 1951	1951 Australian federal election
11 May 1951	Writ of election issued by the Speaker of the Legislative Assembly.
21 May 1951	Nominations
16 June 1951	Polling day
6 July 1951	Return of writ

== Result ==
1951 Neutral Bay by-election
Party	Candidate	Votes	%	±%
Liberal	Ivan Black	unopposed		
Liberal hold				

== See also ==
- Electoral results for the district of Neutral Bay
- List of New South Wales state by-elections
