= 1945 Blacktown state by-election =

Election result for Blacktown, New South Wales, Australia

A by-election was held in the state electoral district of Blacktown on 18 August 1945. The by-election was triggered by the death of Frank Hill (Labor).

== Dates ==
Date	Event
11 July 1945	Frank Hill died.
25 July 1945	Writ of election issued by the Speaker of the Legislative Assembly.
3 August 1945	Nominations
18 August 1945	Polling day
31 August 1945	Return of writ

== Results ==
1945 Blacktown by-election Saturday 18 August
Party	Candidate	Votes	%	±%
Labor	John Freeman	10,879	55.5	+4.3
Liberal	George Maunder	6,344	32.4	+13.3
Independent	Ernest Phelps	1,913	9.8	
Independent	John Cammell	453	2.3	
Total formal votes		19,589	97.3	+1.7
Informal votes		538	2.7	−1.7
Turnout		20,127	82.8	−8.1
Labor hold		Swing		

Preferences were not distributed.

== See also ==
- Electoral results for the district of Blacktown
- List of New South Wales state by-elections
