= Tony Bleasdale =

Australian politician (1946–2024)

Emeritus Mayor Tony Bleasdale OAM
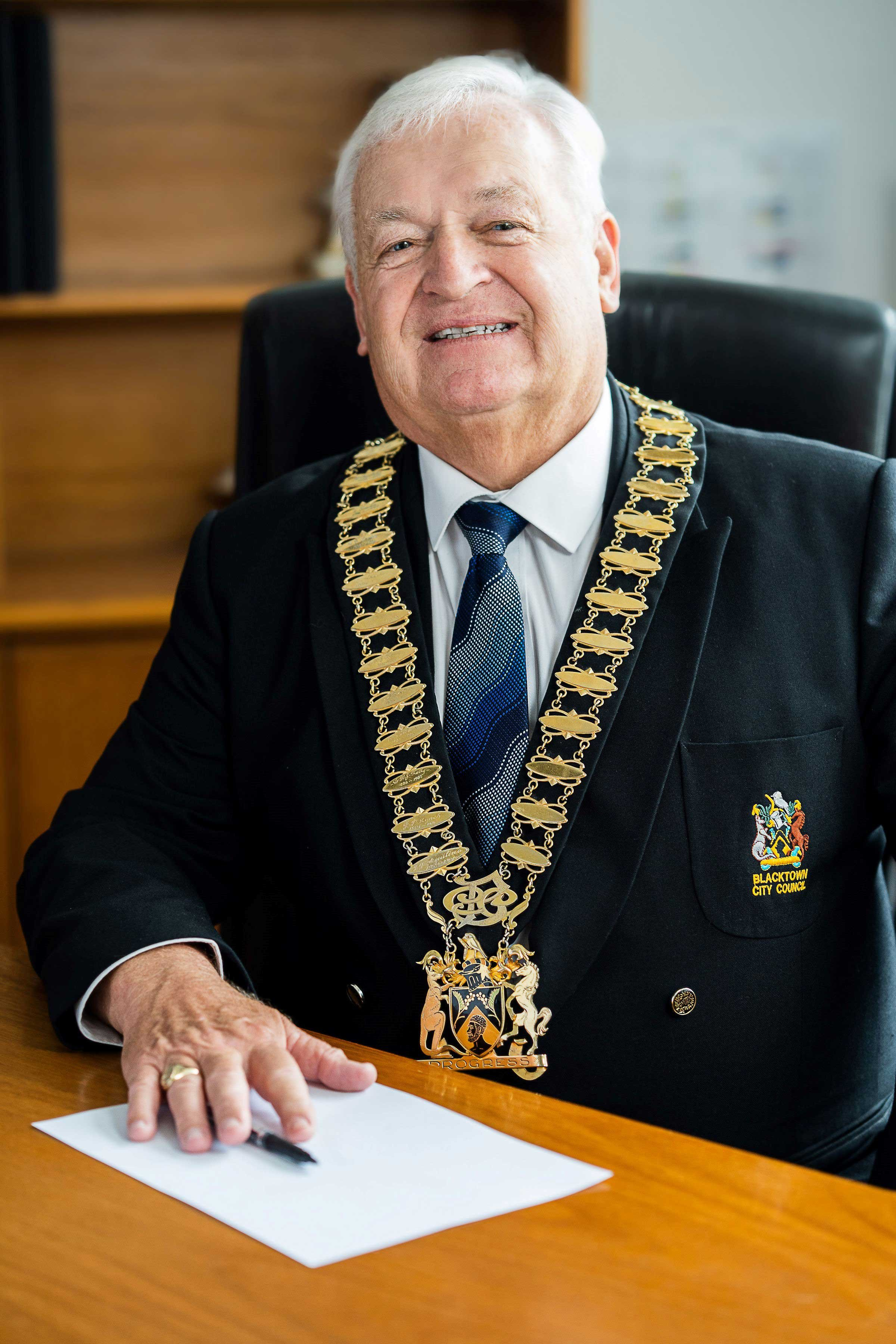

Mayor of Blacktown
- In office 14 October 2019 – 3 May 2024
- Deputy: Julie Griffiths; Brad Bunting; Christopher Quilkey
- Preceded by: Stephen Bali
- Succeeded by: Brad Bunting

Deputy Mayor of Blacktown
- In office 17 September 2016 – 9 October 2019
- Preceded by: Kathie Collins
- Succeeded by: Julie Griffiths

Councillor of the City of Blacktown
- In office November 1996 – 3 May 2024

Personal details
- Born: 1946 Liverpool, Huyton, England
- Died: 3 May 2024 (aged 77)
- Party: Labor
- Spouse: Nina Bleasdale
- Relations: Alan Bleasdale (cousin); Kristina Keneally (cousin)
- Children: 4
- Occupation: Trade Union Official, Businessman

Anthony John Bleasdale (1946 – 3 May 2024) was an Australian politician who served as a Labor councillor on Blacktown City Council from 1996. He was Deputy Mayor from 2016 to 2019 and Mayor of Blacktown from October 2019 until his death in May 2024.

Bleasdale succeeded Stephen Bali as mayor at an extraordinary council meeting in October 2019 and was re-elected unopposed on 9 September 2020.

In the 2010 Australia Day Honours, he was awarded the Medal of the Order of Australia (OAM) for “service to the community as a supporter of charitable organisations, and to local government in the Blacktown area.”

== Early life ==
Bleasdale was born in Huyton, Merseyside, England, to Frank Bleasdale, a docker at the Port of Liverpool, and May Bleasdale. He was one of eight children. He was educated at St Columba’s Catholic Primary School and Woolfall Heath Secondary Modern School.

He was related to screenwriter Alan Bleasdale and was a distant cousin of former Premier of New South Wales Kristina Keneally.

=== Migration to Australia ===
At the age of 16, Bleasdale emigrated to Australia under the auspices of the Big Brother Movement, a charitable organisation that assisted young British migrants. His decision was influenced in part by the 1956 film Smiley, starring Chips Rafferty.

He initially undertook training at what is now Calmsley Hill City Farm in Abbotsbury, New South Wales, and worked on the Borg family farm at Quakers Road, Marayong, in the City of Blacktown.

== Trade union and professional career ==
Bleasdale completed a bricklaying apprenticeship and worked on projects including the TNT Towers in Redfern and restoration works at St Andrew's Cathedral, Sydney. He later became active in the trade union movement, serving as a delegate and subsequently as an organiser and Assistant Secretary of the Building Workers' Industrial Union of Australia. In these roles he advocated for reforms including sick leave entitlements, improved workers’ compensation, compulsory superannuation and portable long service leave. He also supported international campaigns against Apartheid in South Africa.

After leaving the union movement, Bleasdale joined the McNamara Group, a Western Sydney construction firm, as Employee Relations and Safety Manager. He later established his own construction services company.

== Death ==
Bleasdale died on 3 May 2024 while on a return flight from visiting Blacktown City Council’s sister cities of Liaocheng in China and Suseong-gu in South Korea. He was 77.

His funeral was officiated by Bishop Vincent Long Van Nguyen of the Roman Catholic Diocese of Parramatta. Among those in attendance were the Premier of New South Wales, Chris Minns, and Deputy Premier Prue Car.

=== Posthumous recognition ===
On 24 July 2024, Blacktown City Council awarded Bleasdale and his wife, Nina Bleasdale, the “Keys to the City of Blacktown”, the highest civic honour conferred by the council. In October 2024, Local Government NSW conferred upon him the title of Emeritus Mayor.
