= Australian American Association =

Community organisation based in Australia

The Australian American Association (AAA), formerly known as the Australian–American Co-operative Movement and sometimes spelt Australian-American Association, is a non-profit community organisation that aims to enhance the understanding, mutual appreciation, and friendly co-operation between Australia and the United States. Founded in 1941 based on ideas espoused in the earlier British-American Cooperation Movement for World Peace, the organisation has divisions in most states and territories of Australia, and has the support of both governments.

== History ==
The Australian American Association has its origins in the British-American Cooperation Movement for World Peace, founded in Sydney in July 1936 by two Australian World War I veterans, Brigadier H. A. Goddard and Sir Ernest Keith White, led by Sir Henry Braddon. Braddon addressed a campaign launch in Brisbane in August of that year, citing support from the Rotary International, chambers of commerce, and other clubs. He later went to Melbourne to campaign for the movement there.

After the outbreak of World War II in September 1939, the prime minister of Australia, Sir Robert Menzies, endorsed the movement, then with 4,000 members. The government gave it a grant of £1,650 after it offered to cooperate with the newly established Department of Information and agreed to change its name to Australian-American Cooperation Movement.

On 20 December 1940, the inaugural luncheon of the Australian-American Co-operation Movement was held at the Wentworth Hotel in Sydney. Ian Clunies Ross, then dean of the Faculty of Veterinary at the University of Sydney, addressed attendees. He cited the aims of the movement as:

1. To extend fellowship and hospitality to American visitors, and
2. To contribute to a better understanding by the Australian public of American affairs.

In February 1941, a meeting of the Australian–American Co-operative Movement in Melbourne was addressed by F. Alexander, history professor at the University of Western Australia, who had just returned from spending a year in the US. In 1941, the head of the American section of the Department of Information first used the name "Australian American Association", suggesting creating a division in Brisbane.

Journalist and media proprietor Sir Keith Murdoch, then Director-general of the Department of Information, established the Australian-American Co-operation Movement in Victoria in 1941. An association originally formed in Adelaide, South Australia in the late 1930s was revived in March 1941 as the Australian–American Co-operation Movement, with novelist and poet Paul McGuire (later a diplomat) prominent in the SA movement. A division was formed in Perth, Western Australia, in June 1942, called "a branch of the Australian-American Co-operative Movement".

Also referred to in later sources as the Australian–American Co-operative Movement, this movement was reported as being "initiated by a body of Australian citizens" with a set of beliefs that were set out various newspapers in New South Wales in the same month.

In February 1946, John Buchan, Lord Tweedsmuir referred to "influential organizations as the Australian-American Co-operative Movement, supported by a number of powerful business houses, and Australian-Soviet House, with a large Left-Wing and Liberal support" in the House of Lords in the British Parliament.

The first federal meeting of the various state groups was held on 10 November 1943 in Sydney, and in 1947 the council changed the name to Australian American Association. Various other chapters were established over the years, including the Canberra Division, established in 1960.

In 2024, the Canberra AAA, with 70-strong membership, joined the rebranded Canberra Services Club.

== Structure and governance ==
The Federation of Australian American Associations is the umbrella body for all Australian American divisional associations across Australia. Each division has its own governing council or committee, and there is an annual national conference for state and territory representatives meet to discuss past and future activities and goals.
