= Stephen Bali =

Australian politician

Stephen Bali MP
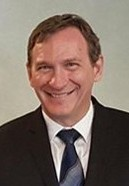

Member of the New South Wales Legislative Assembly
- Incumbent
- Assumed office 14 October 2017
- Constituency: Blacktown

Parliamentary Secretary for Planning and Public Spaces
- Incumbent
- Assumed office 1 May 2023
- Minister: Paul Scully

35th Mayor of Blacktown
- In office 17 September 2014 – 9 October 2019
- Deputy: Russ Dickens; Jacqueline Donaldson; Tony Bleasdale
- Preceded by: Len Robinson
- Succeeded by: Tony Bleasdale

Deputy Mayor of Blacktown
- In office 2 September 2009 – 22 September 2010
- Mayor: Charlie Lowles
- Preceded by: Alan Pendleton
- Succeeded by: Kathie Collins

Councillor of the City of Blacktown for Ward 4
- In office 23 March 2004 – 14 October 2019

Personal details
- Born: 12 November
- Party: Australian Labor Party (New South Wales Branch)
- Website: stephenbali.com.au

Stephen Louis Bali is an Australian politician. He has been a Labor member of the New South Wales Legislative Assembly representing the Electoral District of Blacktown since a by-election held to replace former Labor leader John Robertson in late 2017. He previously served as the mayor of Blacktown City Council between 2014 and 2019.

== Early life ==
Bali was raised in the suburb of Doonside in the heart of Western Sydney by his parents Karoly (Charlie) and Eva Bali, where he still lives today. His father Charlie Bali also served as a councillor and deputy mayor of Blacktown City Council.

Bali graduated with a Bachelor of Business from the Macarthur Institute of Higher Education, a Master of Commerce from the University of Western Sydney, and a Graduate Diploma of Applied Finance from the Finance Institute of Australia.

Between 1996 and 2000, Bali was an associate lecturer at the University of Western Sydney, and from 2000 to 2004 a lecturer at the University of Newcastle.

Before entering politics, Bali was an official at the Australian Workers Union from 2004 to 2017.

== Political career ==
Stephen Bali was first elected to Blacktown City Council in 2004, representing Ward 4. He was deputy mayor between 2009 and 2010, before being elected as mayor in 2014 by its 15 councillors.

In 2016, Mayor Bali was elected as the president of the Western Sydney Regional Organisation of Councils, an organisation of local government areas in Western Sydney including Blacktown City.

On 8 August 2017, the then state member for Blacktown John Robertson announced he would be resigning from the NSW Legislative Assembly, causing a by-election to be held later that year on 14 October. Bali, the then high-profile mayor of Blacktown, was endorsed as Labor's candidate to succeed the former leader. He was elected as the state member for Blacktown, with 82.3% of the two-party-preferred vote. In his inaugural speech to the parliament Bali outlined his goals for health, education, and infrastructure for his electorate, which he claimed had previously been "excluded". Bali was subsequently returned to the Legislative Assembly in the 2019 New South Wales State general election with a two-party-preferred vote of 67.74%, and a swing of +4.55 points.

Bali continued to serve as both the member and the mayor of Blacktown; but due to legislation introduced by the Liberal O'Farrell State Government in 2012, members of the NSW State Parliament could not hold office in local government concurrently for more than two years. As a result, Bali resigned as a councillor and mayor of Blacktown City Council on 9 October 2019.

Bali re-contested Blacktown at the 2023 New South Wales state election and was re-elected with 69.1% of the two-party-preferred vote, a swing of 2.5 points. He was subsequently announced as Parliamentary Secretary for Planning and Public Spaces on 26 April 2023.

== Activism and charity work ==
In 2015, mayor Bali had heavily opposed the controversial SBS documentary Struggle Street, which depicted what residents called an "unflattering depiction of [Mount Druitt]". In a statement at the time, Bali denounced the documentary as "publicly funded poverty porn". After discussions between Blacktown City Council and SBS management deteriorated, Bali commandeered ten council garbage trucks to blockade the Special Broadcaster's headquarters in Artarmon.

Bali also serves as the chair of the Better Foundation , a charity created in 2016 which operates in the Blacktown and Mount Druitt area specifically to raise funds for Blacktown Hospital and Mount Druitt Hospital for equipment, training, and other resources that the state government's budget does not fund.

Civic offices
Preceded by Alan Pendleton	Deputy Mayor of Blacktown; 2009–2010	Succeeded by Kathie Collins
Preceded by Len Robinson	Mayor of Blacktown; 2014–2019	Succeeded by Tony Bleasdale
New South Wales Legislative Assembly
Preceded by John Robertson	Member for Blacktown; 2017–present	Incumbent
