= 2017 Blacktown state by-election =

Election result for Blacktown, New South Wales, Australia

- 14 October 2017
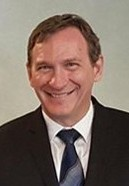

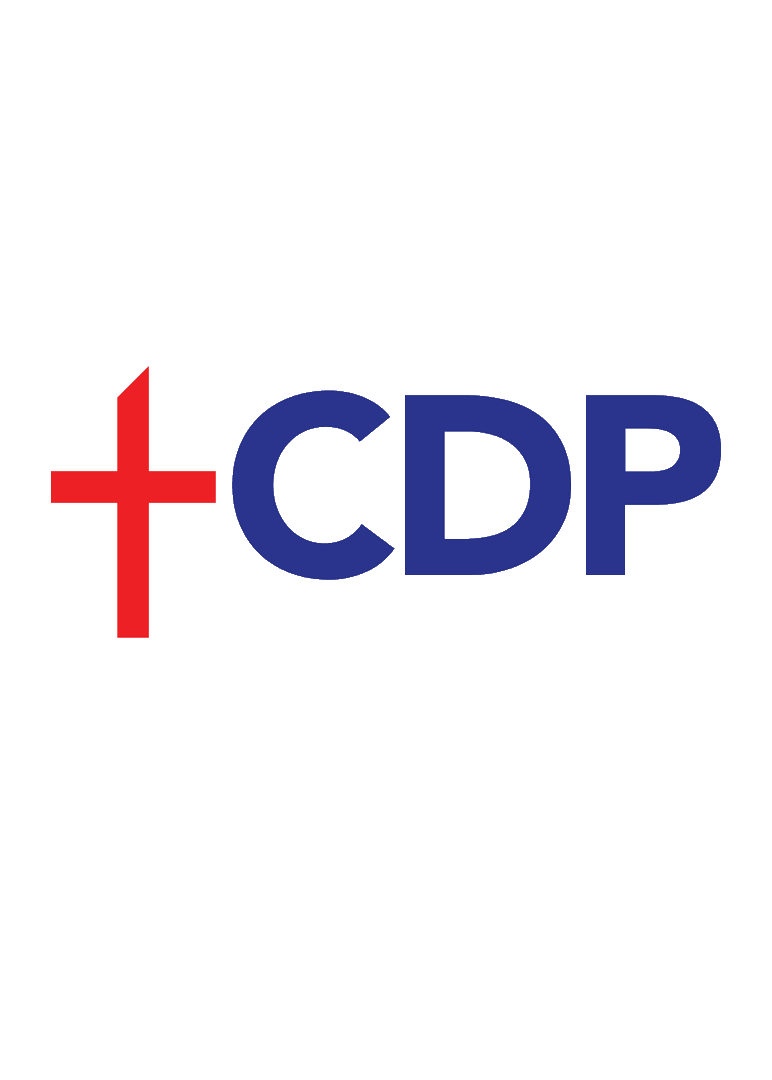
	First party	Second party
Leader	Stephen Bali	Josh Green
Party	Labor	Christian Democrats
Popular vote	31,031	6,540
Percentage	71.6%	15.1%
Swing	▲17.7pp	▲9.1pp
TPP	82.3%	17.7%
TPP swing	▲19.1pp	▲17.7pp
MP before election
John Robertson
Labor
Elected MP
Stephen Bali
Labor

A by-election was held in the state electoral district of Blacktown on 14 October 2017. The by-election was triggered by the resignation of John Robertson (Labor). Robertson served as state Leader of the Opposition from 2011 until 2014.

The by-election was held on the same day as by-elections Cootamundra and Murray.

== Candidates ==
The candidates in ballot paper order are as follows:

Candidate nominations
Party	Candidate	Notes
Christian Democratic Party (Fred Nile Group)	Josh Green	Contested state elections for Macquarie Fields in 2011 and Electoral district of Mount Druitt in 2015 and federal elections in Grayndler in 2013 and Chifley in 2016
Labor	Stephen Bali	Resident of Doonside and incumbent Mayor of Blacktown and Blacktown councillor since 2004. Bali also serves as President of the New South Wales Branch and National Vice President of the Australian Workers' Union.
Greens NSW	Chris Winslow	
Independent	Vivek Singha	

== Results ==
2017 Blacktown by-election Saturday 14 October
Party	Candidate	Votes	%	±%
Labor	Stephen Bali	31,031	71.6	+17.7
Christian Democrats	Josh Green	6,540	15.1	+9.1
Greens	Chris Winslow	3,825	8.8	+2.5
Independent	Vivek Singha	1,966	4.5	+4.5
Total formal votes		43,362	95.1	−0.2
Informal votes		2,229	4.9	+0.2
Turnout		45,591	81.5	−7.5
Two-candidate-preferred result
Labor	Stephen Bali	33,208	82.3	+19.1
Christian Democrats	Josh Green	7,154	17.7	+17.7
Labor hold		Swing	N/A	

== See also ==
- Electoral results for the district of Blacktown
- List of New South Wales state by-elections
