= Ernest White (political activist) =

Australian timber merchant and political activist

Sir Ernest Keith White CBE, MC (14 August 1892 – 1 August 1983) was an Australian timber merchant and political activist.

== Early life and education ==
Ernest Keith White was born on 14 August 1892 at Gosford to timber contractor Robert John White and Bertha, née Davis.

After attending Gosford Public School, he left at twelve and served in the junior cadets and worked for his father. He studied by correspondence with Sydney Technical College, qualifying through the Royal Sanitary Institute as a sanitary engineer.

== Career ==
White worked as an inspector for Gosford and Moree shire councils before passing the local government and shire clerk's certificate.

On 8 June 1915 he enlisted in the Australian Imperial Force. After marrying in November 1915, he embarked as a second lieutenant in January 1916 as part of reinforcements for the 4th Battalion. He was wounded at Pozières in July and, after returning, rose to become the adjutant in July 1917. At Strazeele in April 1918 he reconnoitred the front line under heavy fire, winning the Military Cross and a mention in despatches. Promoted to captain in September, his appointment was terminated on 5 April 1919.

After the war, White returned to work with his father's timber business, moving the headquarters to Sydney. Based in Strathfield, he also bought a timber property near Gloucester and developed land at Terrigal, Wamberal, and Forresters Beach.

== Politics ==
He was also politically active, mainly in anti-Labor circles. He tried to persuade Roden Cutler to head a National and Services Movement, but instead launched the Liberal Democratic Party on 16 April 1943 with Stanley S. Crick. The LDP had fraught relations with the United Australia Party and its New South Wales successor the Democratic Party, but it never won seats at federal or state level.

In December 1944 White was a founder of the Liberal Party of Australia and the LDP was dissolved in January 1945. Initially sitting on the provisional executive, he soon resigned in April 1945, standing as an independent for the federal seat of Warringah in 1954; this led to his expulsion from the Liberal Party.

== Other activities ==
White helped to establish the British-American Cooperation Movement for World Peace in July 1936 (which became the Australian-American Association in 1941), and served as federal and state president. He was also significantly involved in the creation of the Australian-American Memorial in Canberra.

== Honours ==
He was appointed Officer of the Order of the British Empire in 1954, Commander in 1967, and was knighted in 1969.

== Personal life ==
White married schoolteacher Pauline Marjory Mason, daughter of the mayor of Gosford, on 15 November 1915. He owned several successful racehorses, which helped finance an opulent house built in 1936.

He died on 1 August 1983 at North Sydney, survived by his wife and two daughters, his son having been killed during World War II.
