= Commonwealth Party (New South Wales) =

Former political party in Australia

The Commonwealth Party was a short-lived, urban, conservative political party in New South Wales between May 1943 and January 1944.

The United Australia Party, in coalition with the Country Party was in power federally and in New South Wales throughout much of the 1930s. However, ideological and leadership issues resulted in severe fissures occurring in conservative political forces towards the end of the decade. This was seen most markedly in the deposing of the Prime Minister Robert Menzies federally in 1941 and the NSW Premier Bertram Stevens in 1939. Menzies was succeeded as leader of the UAP by Billy Hughes in 1943.

The Commonwealth Party was launched on 27 May 1943, sponsored by the Fighting Forces and Civilians' Organisation. Hughes referred to such formation of parties as "mushroom growths". Another party, the Liberal Democratic Party split from the NSW division of the UAP prior to the 1943 federal election in August. Hughes led the party to a disastrous defeat at the 1943 election. The party's national primary vote was reduced by 8% and it lost 9 of its 23 seats since the 1940 election. It is unknown if Commonwealth Party contested any seats.

After the election, what remained of the UAP's NSW division began discussions with the Liberal Democratic Party and Commonwealth Party on a merger to form a new party, proposed to be also named Liberal Democratic Party. By November 1943, discussions were almost completed and unity was likely. The County Party refused to join in the merger but expressed they would co-operate with the new party. However, during the unity conference on 24 November 1943, the LDP walked out of the conference as they were not willing to support retaining the secretary of the UAP, H. W. Horsfield, as the secretary of the new party, as well as retaining members of his staff. Instead, during the same conference, the Commonwealth Party and the New South Wales UAP proceeded to merge without the LDP to form the Democratic Party. As such, LDP remained a separate party to the Democratic Party.

Between January and April 1945, the Democratic Party and Liberal Democratic Party joined the newly formed Liberal Party of Australia and merged into its New South Wales division.

== See also ==
- 1943 Australian federal election
- United Australia Party - main conservative party in New South Wales
- Democratic Party (1943) - successor to the Commonwealth Party
- Liberal Democratic Party (New South Wales) - a similar but separate party to the Commonwealth Party
