= 1945 Neutral Bay state by-election =

Election result for Neutral Bay, New South Wales, Australia

A by-election was held for the New South Wales Legislative Assembly seat of Neutral Bay on Saturday 15 December 1945. It was triggered by the death of the Leader of the New South Wales Liberal Party and Leader of the Opposition, Reginald Weaver, who died a week after suffering a mild heart attack in the Legislative Assembly chamber.

The seat was subsequently won by barrister Ivan Black (Liberal). Neutral Bay being a safe Liberal seat, the Labor Party chose not to field a candidate.

== Dates ==
Date	Event
12 November 1945	Reginald Weaver died.
27 November 1945	Writ of election issued by the Speaker of the Legislative Assembly.
4 December 1945	Nominations
15 December 1945	Polling day
29 December 1945	Return of writ

== Background ==
The seat of Neutral Bay, a safe Liberal seat, was held since 1927 by Reginald Weaver, who served as a Minister of the Crown in the Bavin and Stevens Governments. Weaver was the Speaker of the New South Wales Legislative Assembly until 1941 and the Leader of the Opposition since February 1944. He was also the first parliamentary leader of the newly formed New South Wales Liberal Party since April 1945. Weaver suffered a heart attack in the Legislative Assembly chamber on the evening of 7 November 1945, and died a week later on 12 November 1945 at Hornsby Hospital.

Only two candidates nominated for the by-election. They were: Ivan Black, a barrister and war veteran, for the Liberal Party and Kenneth McLeod Bolton, a merchant, standing as an independent. A. E. Newland, the candidate of the small Services and Consumers Party of Australia, who had previously expressed interest in contesting, did not nominate because his name was not on the state electoral roll.

== Results ==
The Liberal Party retained the seat, with a minimal change in the margin. The Liberal candidate, Ivan Black, emerged with 56% of the vote against Independent Kenneth Bolton.

1945 Neutral Bay by-election Saturday 15 December
Party	Candidate	Votes	%	±%
Liberal	Ivan Black	10,839	56.4	−0.5
Independent	Kenneth Bolton	8,393	43.6	
Total formal votes		19,232	96.7	−0.9
Informal votes		657	3.3	+0.9
Turnout		19,889	77.6	−12.9
Liberal hold		Swing	N/A	

== See also ==
- Electoral results for the district of Neutral Bay
- List of New South Wales state by-elections
