= Jim Southee =

Australian politician

James Bernard Southee

New South Wales Legislative Assembly
- In office 1962–1973
- Constituency: Blacktown; The Hills

Personal details
- Born: 6 June 1902; Mildura, Victoria, Australia
- Died: 30 June 1979 (aged 77); Campbelltown, New South Wales, Australia
- Spouse: Miriam Cross
- Occupation: Politician

James Bernard Southee (6 June 1902 – 30 June 1979) was an Australian politician. He was a Labor member of the New South Wales Legislative Assembly, representing Blacktown from 1962 to 1971 and Mount Druitt from 1971 to 1973.

== Biography ==
Southee was born in Mildura to farmer Laurence Southee and Annie Lockie. He was educated at public schools in Mildura and Leeton and assisted his father on their farm. He joined the Labor Party in 1929 and became active in the Australian Workers' Union. He married Muriel Crotty in 1944, with whom he had a daughter. In 1956 he became President of the New South Wales branch of the AWU, serving until 1961; he was also a member of the central executive (1957–1961).

In 1962, Southee was the Labor candidate for Blacktown, which had been made notionally Labor by the redistribution (the sitting member, Alfred Dennis, contested The Hills as an independent), and was easily elected. Re-elected in 1965 and 1968, he moved to the new seat of Mount Druitt in 1971. Southee retired in 1973; he died at Campbelltown in 1979 aged 77. Southee was buried beside his wife, Muriel at Pine Grove Memorial Park.

New South Wales Legislative Assembly
Preceded by Alfred Dennis	Member for Blacktown; 1962–1971	Succeeded by Gordon Barnier
Preceded by New seat	Member for Mount Druitt; 1971–1973	Succeeded by Tony Johnson
