= 1944 New South Wales state election =

State election for New South Wales, Australia in May 1944

← 1941	27 May 1944	1947 →

All 90 seats in the New South Wales Legislative Assembly 46 Assembly seats were needed for a majority
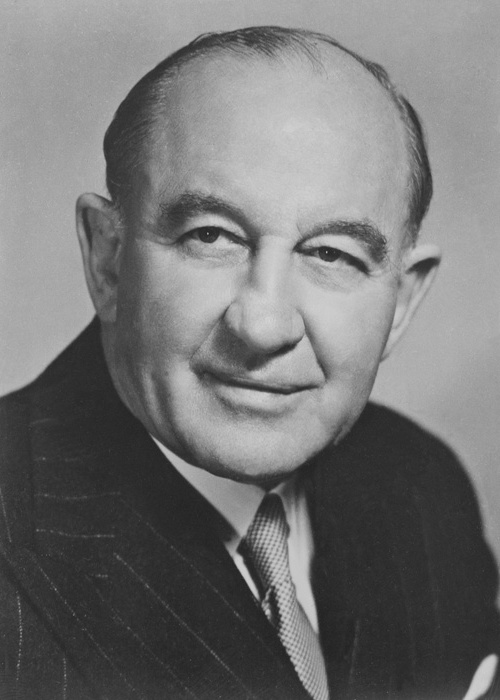

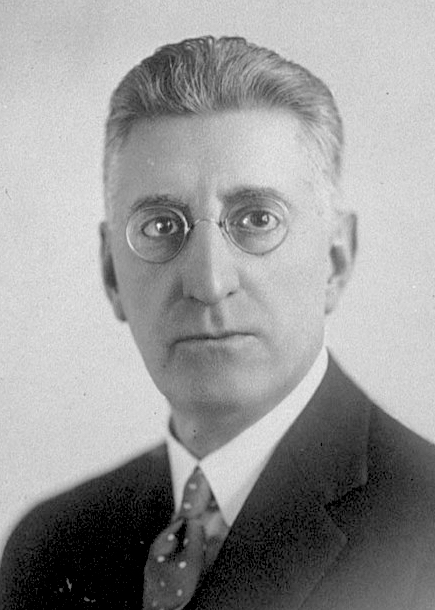

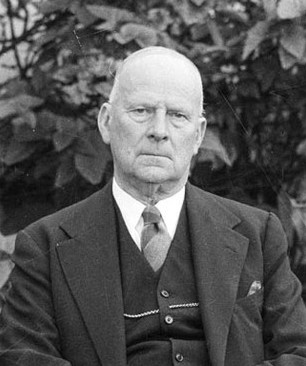
	First party	Second party	Third party
Leader	William McKell	Reginald Weaver	Michael Bruxner
Party	Labor	Democratic	Country
Leader since	23 September 1939	10 February 1944	26 April 1932
Leader's seat	Redfern	Neutral Bay	Tenterfield
Last election	54 seats	14 seats	12 seats
Seats won	56	12	10
Seat change	▲2	▼2	▼2
Percentage	45.20%	18.91%	10.41%
Swing	▼5.60	▼1.38	▼0.64
- Two-candidate-preferred margin by electorate
Premier before election
William McKell
Labor
Elected Premier
William McKell
Labor

The 1944 New South Wales state election was held on 27 May 1944. It was conducted in single member constituencies with compulsory preferential voting and was held on boundaries created at a 1940 redistribution. The election was for all of the 90 seats in the Legislative Assembly.

== Issues ==
The Labor government of William McKell faced its first challenge at a general election in May 1944. The campaign was overshadowed by the course of World War II and the Sydney Morning Herald noted that in such an uncertain environment it was difficult for any party to make extensive plans for the future. This was particularly the case as many of the responsibilities of the states had been usurped by the Commonwealth Government under emergency war powers.

McKell's three years in government had enhanced his reputation as a moderate and cautious leader. Under his leadership the extreme left wing of the party had been expelled and had contested the 1941 as the State Labor Party. Its poor showing had resulted in its dissolution shortly after the election and most members then joined the Communist Party of Australia. However, Labor unity was again threatened by Jack Lang who had been expelled from the Labor Party in 1943 and had formed another version of the Lang Labor Party. On this occasion he received no support from the rest of the caucus and spent the rest of the term as the sole member.

In comparison to the Labor Party, the urban conservative political forces were in complete disarray. The very poor results of the United Australia Party (UAP) under Billy Hughes at the 1943 federal election had increased the divisions within the party. The Democratic Party, which was a merger of the Commonwealth Party and UAP in November 1943, had emerged as the main conservative party in New South Wales state politics. It was led by Reginald Weaver and had the support of most of the former UAP members of parliament. However the Liberal Democratic Party, which had been founded by the Sydney timber merchant and businessman Ernest White (later Sir Ernest), attracted significant media attention and had a large and expensive advertising campaign. White claimed that the UAP and Democratic Party had been overly concerned with infighting and were no longer able to give coherence to conservative political aspirations. His party while supporting an extension of the welfare safety-net called for an increased effort to win the war including the mandatory deregistration of unions involved in unreasonable strike action. The Sydney Morning Herald commented that the Liberal Democratic Party was "a mouse" attempting to "swallow the Democratic Party lion".

== Key dates ==
Date	Event
24 April 1944	The Legislative Assembly was dissolved, and writs were issued by the Governor to proceed with an election.
28 April 1944	Nominations for candidates for the election closed at noon.
27 May 1944	Polling day.
8 June 1944	Second McKell ministry sworn in
22 June 1944	Last day for the writs to be returned and the results formally declared.
22 June 1944	Opening of 34th Parliament.

== Results ==
There was little change in the composition of parliament, with Labor retaining its large majority.

At the election Lang's party won 2 of the 23 seats in which it stood candidates. Its total primary vote of 9.33%, which significantly reduced Labor's primary vote but made little difference to the distribution of seats. The Liberal Democratic Party did not fulfill pre-election predictions and gained less than 4% of the vote with no seats.

New South Wales state election, 27 May 1944 Legislative Assembly << 1941–1947 >>
Enrolled voters	1,732,706 (Note: There were 1,433,166 enrolled voters in 74 contested electorates and 299,540 were enrolled in 16 uncontested electorates (13 Labor, 1 Democrat, 1 Country and 1 Independent).)				
Votes cast	1,310,270		Turnout	91.42	−1.10
Informal votes	43,329		Informal	3.31	+0.78
Summary of votes by party
Party	Primary votes	%	Swing	Seats	Change
Labor	572,600	45.20	−5.60	56	+2
Democratic	239,610	18.91	+1.38 (Note: Compared to United Australia Party at 1941 election)	12	−2
Country	131,950	10.41	−0.64	10	−2
Lang Labor	118,174	9.33	+9.33	2	+2
Independent	72,431	5.72	−0.41	5	+1
Liberal Democratic	49,325	3.89	+3.89	0	0
Independent Democrat	30,532	2.41	−0.84 (Note: Compared to Independent UAP at 1941 election)	4	−1
Independent Labor	22,697	1.79	−0.35	0	–1
Communist	21,982	1.74	+1.74	0	–
Independent Country	6,670	0.53	+0.53	1	+1
State Labor	0	0	−5.64	0	–
All others	970	0.08	−0.62	0	–
Total	1,266,941			90	

== Seats changing party representation ==
This table lists changes in party representation since the 1941 election but does not include United Australia Party members who retained their seats as Democratic Party members

Seat	1941		1944	
Seat	Party	Member	Member	Party
Auburn	Labor	Jack Lang (Note: Lang had been expelled from the Labor Party in 1943)	Jack Lang	Lang Labor
Burwood	Ind. United Australia	Gordon Jackett	Gordon Jackett	Democratic
Dubbo (Note: Clarrie Robertson (Labor) won Dubbo from the Country Party at the 1942 by-election caused by the death of George Wilson)	Country		Clarrie Robertson	Labor
Lachlan (Note: John Chanter (Labor) won Lachlan from the Country Party at the 1943 by-election caused by the death of Griffith Evans)	Country		John Chanter	Labor
Lane Cove	United Australia	Herbert FitzSimons	Henry Woodward	Labor
Manly	United Australia	Alfred Reid	Alfred Reid	Independent Democrat
Murrumbidgee	Independent Labor	George Enticknap	George Enticknap	Labor
Nepean	United Australia	Joseph Jackson	Joseph Jackson	Independent
Newtown	Labor	Frank Burke	Lilian Fowler	Lang Labor
Oxley	Independent	George Mitchell	Les Jordan	Independent Country
Tamworth	Ind. United Australia	Bill Chaffey	Bill Chaffey	Independent

== Aftermath ==
McKell remained premier until he was appointed Governor General in early 1947. Weaver became the leader of the United Democratic Party, formed from the urban conservative parties in late 1944. The Democratic Party became the New South Wales division of the Liberal Party of Australia in early 1945, with Weaver becoming its inaugural leader. However, he died in November that year and was succeeded by former Premier Alexander Mair, who was then succeeded by Vernon Treatt in March 1946. Michael Bruxner retained his leadership of the Country Party, which he had held since 1932, throughout the parliament.

There were 9 by-elections during the parliament but the overall composition of the parties stayed intact.

== See also ==
- Candidates of the 1944 New South Wales state election
- Members of the New South Wales Legislative Assembly, 1944–1947
