= Alfred Dennis (politician) =

Australian politician (1924–2019)

Member of the New South Wales Legislative Assembly for Blacktown
- In office 21 March 1959 – 5 February 1962
- Preceded by: John Freeman
- Succeeded by: Jim Southee

Personal details
- Born: 31 July 1924 Bondi, New South Wales, Australia
- Died: 15 December 2019 (aged 95) Hervey Bay, Queensland, Australia
- Party: Liberal Party
- Spouse: Mary Dexter (m. 1944)
- Occupation: Dairy farmer

Military service
- Allegiance: Australia
- Branch/service: Australian Army
- Years of service: 1941–1946
- Rank: Corporal
- Battles/wars: World War II

Alfred Hugh Dennis (31 July 1924 – 15 December 2019) was an Australian politician. He was a member of the New South Wales Legislative Assembly from 1959 to 1962, representing the electorate of Blacktown. He was elected in 1959 as a Liberal for the typically safe Labor seat, but resigned to sit as an independent in 1962.

Dennis was born in Bondi, and was educated at Blacktown Public School. He served with the Second Australian Imperial Force in the South Pacific during World War II, and trained at Yanco Experimental Farm after repatriation. He operated a dairy farm near Richmond, while also working as a farming contractor. He was chairman of the Windsor District Milk Zone Dairymen's Council, and a member of the New South Wales executive of the Primary Producers' Union. He was an alderman of the Windsor Council from 1956 until his election to parliament in 1959.

Dennis was nominated as the Liberal candidate for the Labor-held seat of Blacktown at the 1959 state election. Blacktown had been a safe Labor seat, but an electoral redistribution had made it marginal, and the sitting member, John Freeman had chosen to retire. Dennis went on to win the seat against Labor candidate Jim Southee despite Labor's statewide victory.

A further redistribution before the 1962 election erased Dennis' majority and made Blacktown notionally a marginal Labor seat. Nonetheless, Dennis concluded this made Blacktown unwinnable and attempted to win Liberal preselection for the safe Liberal seat of The Hills, losing to Max Ruddock. Dennis subsequently resigned from the Liberal Party and contested The Hills as an independent, losing to Ruddock, while the defeated candidate from 1959, Southee, went on to win Blacktown on a large swing. He subsequently rejoined the Liberal Party, contesting a 1965 by-election for the rural seat of Oxley, but was defeated by Country Party candidate Bruce Cowan.

Dennis moved to Hervey Bay in Queensland in 1970, where he operated a business manufacturing masonry products.

He died in December 2019 at the age of 95.

New South Wales Legislative Assembly
Preceded by John Freeman	Member for Blacktown; 1959–1962	Succeeded by Jim Southee
