= Ivan Black =

Australian politician

Personal details
- Born: 6 July 1913 Ryde, New South Wales
- Died: 8 July 1990 (aged 77) London, England
- Party: Liberal Party

Ivan Carlisle Black (6 July 1913 – 8 July 1990) was an Australian politician and a member of the Liberal Party. He was a member of the New South Wales Legislative Assembly from 1945 until 1962. Black was born in Ryde, New South Wales. He was the son of a mechanical engineer and was educated at Fort Street High School and the University of Sydney. He graduated in Law and was called to the Bar in 1939. During World War 2, Black served with the Royal Australian Naval Volunteer Reserve in the English Channel and North Sea. He was a prisoner of war in Germany between 1942 and 1945.

Black was elected to the New South Wales Parliament as the member for Neutral Bay at a by-election caused by the death of the party leader, Reg Weaver. He remained the member for Neutral Bay until 1951 when he resigned to unsuccessfully contest the party pre-selection for the seat of Warringah at the 1951 Federal election. Subsequently, he was unopposed at the subsequent by-election for Neutral Bay caused by his own resignation. He was also unopposed at the 1953 and 1959 state elections. Black remained the member for Neutral Bay until his retirement at the 1962 election, despite emigrating to England to establish a legal practice in 1961. He did not hold ministerial or party office.

New South Wales Legislative Assembly
Preceded by Reg Weaver	Member for Neutral Bay; 1945–1962	Succeeded by seat abolished
