= John Freeman (Australian politician) =

Australian politician

Personal details
- Born: 8 November 1894 Newtown, Sydney
- Died: 3 April 1970 (aged 75) Sydney
- Party: Labor Party

John Stanley Freeman (11 August 1894 – 4 March 1970) was an Australian politician. He was a member of the New South Wales Legislative Assembly from 1945 until 1959 and a member of the Labor Party (ALP).

Freeman was born in Newtown, New South Wales. He was the son of a bootmaker, and was educated at Sydney Technical College as a pathology laboratory technician. He served in the Australian Army Medical Corps with the First Australian Imperial Force between 1917 and 1919. On repatriation he worked at the University of Sydney Veterinary Research Unit and was active in ex-servicemen's associations. Freeman was an unsuccessful candidate for the seat of Nepean at the 1930 state election. He was elected to the New South Wales Parliament as the Labor member for the seat of Blacktown at the 1945 by-election caused by the death of the sitting Labor member, Frank Hill. He retained the seat for the next 4 elections. A redistribution prior to the 1959 election made Blacktown a marginal seat. Freeman attempted to win Labor pre-selection for Merrylands but when he was unsuccessful against future Deputy Premier Jack Ferguson he retired from parliament. He was awarded the MBE in 1968.

New South Wales Legislative Assembly
| Preceded by Frank Hill | Member for Blacktown; 1945–1959 | Succeeded by Alfred Dennis |
