= Liberal Democratic Party (1943–1945) =

Defunct Australian political party

The Liberal Democratic Party (LDP) was an Australian breakaway political party of the United Australia Party that contested the 1943 federal election and the 1944 New South Wales state election. Formed in 1943, it was replaced by the New South Wales division of the Liberal Party of Australia in January 1945.

== History ==
=== Divisions in UAP ===
In 1931 Joseph Lyons resigned from the Australian Labor Party and together with the opposition Nationalist Party, five dissident Labor MPs and three conservative independent MPs formed the United Australia Party (UAP). This unified the mainstream urban conservative forces in Australia but, in substance, it was largely a continuation of the Nationalists under a new name.

The UAP, in coalition with the Country Party was in power federally and in New South Wales throughout much of the thirties. However, ideological and leadership issues resulted in severe fissures occurring within the conservative political forces towards the end of the decade. These tensions resulted in the party deposing both the NSW Premier Bertram Stevens in 1939 and the Prime Minister, Robert Menzies, in 1941. The party also had difficulty endorsing single candidates in safe seats at the 1941 New South Wales state election.

=== Party formation ===
Menzies was succeeded as leader of the UAP by Billy Hughes, and the party began to disintegrate prior to the 1943 federal election. The Liberal Democratic Party was one of the first of many groups that split from the UAP and its formal launch was at a public meeting in Sydney on 16 April 1943. This meeting was co-chaired by a former Lord Mayor of Sydney, Stanley S. Crick, and the party's founder and President of the Australian-American Co-operation Movement, Ernest White. White was a wealthy Sydney timber merchant and businessman and it was soon apparent that he was the party's chief benefactor and driving force. Predating Menzies' appeal to The Forgotten People, White said that his party stood for "the little people who have so far been inarticulate". He believed that the two major parties were hampering Australia's effort in World War II by promoting class divisions rather than co-operation. The party platform included equal education opportunities for all, full-time permanent employment for all men, reduced taxation, tough action against striking unions and the gradual abolition of tariffs and industry subsidies.

=== Election results ===
The party stood a number of candidates in New South Wales electorates at the 1943 federal election. However, with the exception of Brigadier Denzil Macarthur-Onslow, who gained 21% of the primary vote to come second in Eden-Monaro, and Wing Commander Nigel Love, who polled 19% in Parkes, the party performed poorly. The UAP's results at the election were also poor: its national primary vote was reduced by 8% and it lost nine of its 23 seats from the 1940 election.

After the election, the LDP, the New South Wales United Australia Party (UAP) and the Commonwealth Party began discussions on a merger to form a new party, proposed to be also named Liberal Democratic Party. By November 1943, discussions were almost completed and unity was likely. The Country Party declined to join the merger but expressed they would co-operate with the new party.

However, during the unity conference on 24 November 1943, the LDP walked out of the conference as they were not willing to support retaining the secretary of the UAP, H. W. Horsfield, as the secretary of the new party, as well as retaining members of his staff. Instead, during the same conference, the Commonwealth Party and the New South Wales UAP proceeded to merge without the LDP to form the Democratic Party. As such, LDP remained a separate party to the Democratic Party.

In the lead-up to the 1944 state elections, the LDP party generated publicity disproportionate to its size and the Sydney Morning Herald commented that the Liberal Democratic Party was "a mouse" attempting to "swallow the Democratic Party lion". The results of the election, in which the party received less than 4% of the primary vote and did not win a seat, confirmed that it was of minor political importance.

=== Joining the Liberal Party ===
Horsfield, the secretary of the Democratic Party, resigned on 26 July 1944, paving the way for a LDP-Democratic merger again. In August 1944, the LDP initially agreed to merge with the Democratic Party and the new party to be known as the United Democratic Party. However, two days after federal UAP leader Robert Menzies announced that he was planning to set up a new "political movement with a Liberal policy" at an October conference, negotiations between LDP and Democratic Party broke down and the party merger did not take place.

With the formation of the Liberal Party of Australia by Menzies, on 16 January 1945, the LDP was dissolved and replaced by the Liberal Party's New South Wales division.

White remained a disruptive element within the Liberal Party and contested the seat of Warringah against the party's endorsed candidate at the 1954 federal election. In his old age, White would claim that he, rather than Menzies, had been the founder of the Liberal Party.

== Prominent party members ==
White's party attracted a number of young conservative activists who would later be prominent in Australian public life or have political careers in the Liberal Party. They included Bill Wentworth, Norman Thomas (a former member of the New South Wales Legislative Assembly for the seat of Bondi), Roden Cutler, Brice Mutton and Eileen Furley, the first conservative female member of the New South Wales Legislative Council.

However, White's overbearing manner and his insistence that the party have a free trade platform soon caused many of its members to leave. The party gained significant publicity prior to the 1943 federal election, particularly through a weekly broadcast by White over Radio Station 2CH.

== See also ==
- 1943 Australian federal election
- 1944 New South Wales state election
- United Australia Party
- Democratic Party (1943) - a similar but separate party to the Liberal Democratic Party
- New South Wales Liberal Party - successor to the Liberal Democratic Party
