= Electoral district of Blacktown =

State electoral district of New South Wales, Australia

Blacktown New South Wales—Legislative Assembly
- Interactive map of district boundaries from the 2023 state election
- State: New South Wales
- Created: 1941
- MP: Stephen Bali
- Party: Labor
- Namesake: Blacktown
- Electors: 58,584 (2023)
- Area: 33.03 km^{2} (12.8 sq mi)
- Demographic: Outer metropolitan
Electorates around Blacktown:
Londonderry	Riverstone	Riverstone; Winston Hills
Mount Druitt	Blacktown	Winston Hills; Prospect
Badgerys Creek	Prospect	Prospect

Blacktown is an electoral district of the Legislative Assembly in the Australian state of New South Wales. The current member is Labor's Stephen Bali, who replaced former Labor leader John Robertson at a by-election in October 2017.

Blacktown is a 33.03 km^{2} urban electorate in Sydney's outer west.

== History ==
Blacktown is known as a largely working-class area, and as such, the electorate has tended to strongly support the Labor Party, which has held the seat for all but three years since its inception. It was briefly marginal during the late 1950s, when long-serving member John Freeman was forced into retirement after trying and failing to find a safer seat. Liberal Alfred Dennis won the seat in the 1959 election, but held it for only one term before Labor regained it.

Since then, Labor's hold on the seat has only been seriously threatened once, when Labor suffered a swing of 18.7 percent amid its massive defeat in 2011. It is the only time since the 1950s that Labor has not won an outright majority of the primary vote in the seat.

== Geography ==
On its current boundaries, Blacktown takes in the suburbs of Blacktown, Doonside, Kings Park, Marayong, Woodcroft and parts of Bungarribee, Lalor Park, Quakers Hill and Seven Hills.

== Members for Blacktown ==
Member	Party	Period
Frank Hill	Labor	1941–1945
John Freeman	Labor	1945–1959
Alfred Dennis	Liberal	1959–1962
Alfred Dennis	Independent	1962
Jim Southee	Labor	1962–1971
Gordon Barnier	Labor	1971–1981
John Aquilina	Labor	1981–1991
Pam Allan	Labor	1991–1999
Paul Gibson	Labor	1999–2011
John Robertson	Labor	2011–2017
Stephen Bali	Labor	2017–present

== Election results ==
2023 New South Wales state election: Blacktown
Party	Candidate	Votes	%	±%
Labor	Stephen Bali	27,128	55.6	+0.9
Liberal	Allan Green	11,637	23.9	−2.6
Legalise Cannabis	Peter Foster	2,524	5.2	+5.2
Greens	Leonard Hobbs	2,521	5.2	−1.1
Animal Justice	Emma Kerin	2,357	4.8	+4.7
Liberal Democrats	Alexander Mishalow	1,559	3.2	+3.2
Sustainable Australia	Patrick Murphy	1,022	2.1	+2.1
Total formal votes		48,748	95.8	−0.1
Informal votes		2,123	4.2	+0.1
Turnout		50,871	86.8	−2.7
Two-party-preferred result
Labor	Stephen Bali	30,091	69.1	+2.5
Liberal	Allan Green	13,442	30.9	−2.5
Labor hold		Swing	+2.5	
