= Frank Hill (Australian politician) =

Australian politician

Personal details
- Born: 5 August 1883 Brisbane, Queensland
- Died: 11 July 1945 (aged 61) Canley Vale, New South Wales
- Party: Labor Party

Francis Hill (5 August 1883 – 11 July 1945) was an Australian politician and a member of the New South Wales Legislative Assembly between 1941 and his death. He was a member of the Labor Party.

== Early life ==
Hill was born in Brisbane, Queensland and was the son of a contractor. His family moved to Sydney when he was young and he was educated to elementary level at the Sussex St Public School. He worked as a warehouseman and a foreman in a factory. A member of the ALP from an early age he became involved in local government and was elected as an alderman to the councils of the Cabramatta and Canley Vale Municipality, which is now part of the City of Fairfield. Hill was mayor between 1935 and 1945 and a member of the executive of the Local Government Association in 1945. He was also active in the establishment of community co-operative credit unions.

== State Parliament ==
Hill was a member of the New South Wales ALP executive elected at the 1940 Easter state conference. This executive had been infiltrated by clandestine members of the Communist Party of Australia (CPA) including Jack Hughes and Walter Evans. Following the signing of the Molotov–Ribbentrop Pact, the prime objective of the CPA and Hughes and Evans was to have the ALP support a "Hands off Russia Campaign". This effectively meant Australian neutrality in World War Two, a position which was unacceptable to the Australian electorate. In response, the former party leader Jack Lang withdrew from the party and, together with his followers, formed the Australian Labor Party (Non-Communist). The Federal Executive of the ALP then acted to suspend the Hughes-Evans executive and replaced it with supporters of Bob Heffron and William McKell, the parliamentary leaders of the NSW party. Many of the supporters of Hughes and Evans then left the ALP and formed the State Labor Party (Hughes-Evans Labor Party) which fielded candidates at the 1941 state election but gained less than 6% of the vote. The party then rapidly disintegrated with most members joining the CPA. Hill appears to have been a dupe during these machinations. When the executive was suspended he was reported to have said that the executive has brought this on themselves by the way they have conducted some of their meetings and that he regretted the methods the executive had used to undermine the party. Hill was not expelled from the party. He remained a member of the ALP under the new federally imposed executive and successfully contested the party pre-selection for the new seat of Blacktown at the 1941 election, which he then won easily. He retained the seat at the 1944 election, but died suddenly the next year. He did not hold caucus, parliamentary or ministerial office.

New South Wales Legislative Assembly
| Preceded by New seat | Member for Blacktown; 1941–1945 | Succeeded by John Freeman |
