= Electoral district of Neutral Bay =

Former state electoral district of New South Wales, Australia

Neutral Bay was an electoral district of the Legislative Assembly in the Australian state of New South Wales, created in 1927, replacing part of the multi-member electorate of North Shore, and named after and including the Sydney suburb of Neutral Bay. It was abolished in 1962 and partly replaced by Kirribilli.

== Members for Neutral Bay ==
Member	Party	Period
Reginald Weaver	Nationalist	1927–1931
Reginald Weaver	United Australia	1931–1943
Reginald Weaver	Democratic	1943–1945
Reginald Weaver	Liberal	1945
Ivan Black	Liberal	1945–1962

== Election results ==
1959 New South Wales state election: Neutral Bay
Party	Candidate	Votes	%	±%
Liberal	Ivan Black	unopposed		
Liberal hold				
