= Democratic Party (1943) =

Political party in Australia (1943–1945)

The Democratic Party was a short-lived, urban, conservative political party which was active in New South Wales, Australia between November 1943 and 1945. The Democratic Party was formed in November 1943 by the union of the United Australia Party (UAP) in New South Wales and the Commonwealth Party. It was one of the main conservative parties in New South Wales and contested the 1944 state election as a coalition with Country Party.

It was not related to the Democratic Party, a Catholic party which contested the 1922 state election.

== History ==
After the 1943 federal election, the Liberal Democratic Party (LDP), New South Wales United Australia Party (UAP) and Commonwealth Party began discussions on a merger to form a new party, proposed to be also named Liberal Democratic Party. The LDP and Commonwealth Party were new parties formed a few months prior in April and May 1943 respectively. By November 1943, discussions were almost completed and unity was likely. The Country Party refused to join in the merger but expressed they would co-operate with the new party. However, during the unity conference on 24 November 1943, the LDP walked out of the conference as they were not willing to support retaining the secretary of the UAP, H.W. Horsfield, as the secretary of the new party, as well as retaining members of his staff. Instead, during the same conference, the Commonwealth Party and the New South Wales UAP proceeded to merge without the LDP to form the Democratic Party. As such, LDP remained a separate party to the Democratic Party.

The initial leader of the Democratic Party was the former premier Alexander Mair, but he resigned on 2 February 1944 was replaced by Reginald Weaver on 10 February. Weaver led the party to the 1944 state election where it won 19% of the vote and 12 of the 90 seats in the Legislative Assembly.

=== Joining the Liberal Party ===
Horsfield, the secretary of the Democratic Party, resigned on 26 July 1944, paving the way for a LDP-Democratic merger again. In August 1944, the LDP initially agreed to merge with the Democratic Party and the new party to be known as the United Democratic Party. However, two days after federal UAP leader Robert Menzies announced that he was planning to set up a new "political movement with a Liberal policy" at an October conference, negotiations between LDP and Democratic Party broke down and the party merger did not take place.

With the formation of the Liberal Party of Australia by Menzies, the Democratic Party joined the Liberal Party in April 1945 and was replaced by the Liberal Party’s NSW division.

== Election results ==
Election	Seats won	±	Total votes	%	Position	Leader
1944	12 / 90	▼2	239,610	18.91%	Opposition	Reginald Weaver

== See also ==
- 1944 New South Wales state election
- Commonwealth Party (New South Wales) - predecessor of the Democratic Party
- United Australia Party - predecessor of the Democratic Party
- Liberal Democrat Party - a similar but separate party to the Democratic Party
- Liberal Party of Australia (New South Wales Division) - successor to the Democratic Party and Liberal Democratic Party
