= Electoral results for the district of Burwood (New South Wales) =

Election results for Burwood, New South Wales, Australia

Burwood, an electoral district of the Legislative Assembly in the Australian state of New South Wales had two incarnations, from 1894 until 1920 and from 1927 until 1988.

Election	Member	Party
1894	William McMillan	Free Trade
1895	William McMillan	Free Trade
1898	William Archer	Independent
1901	William Archer	Independent
1904	Thomas Henley	Liberal Reform
1907	Thomas Henley	Liberal Reform
1910	Thomas Henley	Liberal Reform
1913	Thomas Henley	Liberal Reform
1917	Thomas Henley	Nationalist
Election	Member	Party
1927	Sir Thomas Henley	Nationalist
1930	Sir Thomas Henley	Nationalist
1932	Sir Thomas Henley	United Australia
1935	Gordon Jackett (Note: Gordon Jackett was the father of John Jackett.)	United Australia
1938	Harrie Mitchell	United Australia
1941	Gordon Jackett	Ind. United Australia
1944	Gordon Jackett	Democratic
1947	Gordon Jackett	Liberal
1950	Gordon Jackett	Liberal
1951 by	Leslie Parr	Liberal
1953	Leslie Parr	Liberal
1956	Leslie Parr	Liberal
1957 by	Ben Doig	Liberal
1959	Ben Doig	Liberal
1962	Ben Doig	Liberal / Independent
1965	John Jackett	Liberal
1968	John Jackett	Liberal
1971	John Jackett	Liberal
1973	John Jackett	Liberal
1976	John Jackett	Liberal
1978	Phil O'Neill	Labor
1981	Phil O'Neill	Labor
1984	Paul Zammit	Liberal

== Election results ==
=== Elections in the 1980s ===
==== 1984 ====
1984 New South Wales state election: Burwood
Party	Candidate	Votes	%	±%
Liberal	Paul Zammit	14,377	49.9	+8.1
Labor	Phil O'Neill	13,556	47.1	−8.1
Democrats	Stephen Kirkham	857	3.0	−0.1
Total formal votes		28,790	97.4	+0.9
Informal votes		775	2.6	−0.9
Turnout		29,565	92.8	+2.5
Two-party-preferred result
Liberal	Paul Zammit	14,802	51.6	+8.8
Labor	Phil O'Neill	13,869	48.4	−8.8
Liberal gain from Labor		Swing	+8.8	

==== 1981 ====
1981 New South Wales state election: Burwood
Party	Candidate	Votes	%	±%
Labor	Phil O'Neill	14,976	55.2	+5.5
Liberal	Bruce MacCarthy	11,334	41.8	−4.9
Democrats	Stephen Kirkham	834	3.1	−0.5
Total formal votes		27,144	96.5	
Informal votes		970	3.5	
Turnout		28,114	90.3	
Two-party-preferred result
Labor	Phil O'Neill	15,076	56.9	+2.2
Liberal	Bruce MacCarthy	11,434	43.1	−2.2
Labor hold		Swing	+2.2	

=== Elections in the 1970s ===
==== 1978 ====
1978 New South Wales state election: Burwood
Party	Candidate	Votes	%	±%
Labor	Phil O'Neill	12,611	49.7	+9.4
Liberal	John Jackett	11,836	46.7	−8.7
Democrats	Stephen Kirkham	907	3.6	+3.6
Total formal votes		25,354	97.2	−0.8
Informal votes		736	2.8	+0.8
Turnout		26,090	91.4	−0.9
Two-party-preferred result
Labor	Phil O'Neill	13,083	51.6	+10.0
Liberal	John Jackett	12,271	48.4	−10.0
Labor gain from Liberal		Swing	+10.0	

==== 1976 ====
1976 New South Wales state election: Burwood
Party	Candidate	Votes	%	±%
Liberal	John Jackett	14,680	55.4	−1.8
Labor	Peter Woods	10,687	40.3	+4.0
Workers	John Coles	1,137	4.3	+4.3
Total formal votes		26,504	98.0	+1.0
Informal votes		550	2.0	−1.0
Turnout		27,054	92.3	+1.2
Two-party-preferred result
Liberal	John Jackett	15,476	58.4	−4.0
Labor	Peter Woods	11,028	41.6	+4.0
Liberal hold		Swing	−4.0	

==== 1973 ====
1973 New South Wales state election: Burwood
Party	Candidate	Votes	%	±%
Liberal	John Jackett	14,401	57.2	+5.6
Labor	Phil O'Neill	9,142	36.3	+2.5
Democratic Labor	Agnes Bannon	1,642	6.5	+6.5
Total formal votes		25,185	97.0	
Informal votes		765	3.0	
Turnout		25,950	91.1	
Two-party-preferred result
Liberal	John Jackett	15,715	62.4	−1.4
Labor	Phil O'Neill	9,470	37.6	+1.4
Liberal hold		Swing	−1.4	

==== 1971 ====
1971 New South Wales state election: Burwood
Party	Candidate	Votes	%	±%
Liberal	John Jackett	12,476	51.6	−0.1
Labor	Phil O'Neill	8,184	33.8	+4.3
Independent	Ben Doig	3,091	12.8	−6.0
Communist	Jack Mundey	441	1.8	+1.8
Total formal votes		24,192	97.4	
Informal votes		633	2.6	
Turnout		24,825	91.3	
Two-party-preferred result
Liberal	John Jackett	15,164	62.7	−4.8
Labor	Phil O'Neill	9,028	37.3	+4.8
Liberal hold		Swing	−4.8	

=== Elections in the 1960s ===
==== 1968 ====
1968 New South Wales state election: Burwood
Party	Candidate	Votes	%	±%
Liberal	John Jackett	12,030	51.7	+9.8
Labor	Antony Kelly	6,857	29.5	−0.3
Independent	Ben Doig	4,364	18.8	−9.5
Total formal votes		23,251	96.9	
Informal votes		739	3.1	
Turnout		23,990	91.8	
Two-party-preferred result
Liberal	John Jackett	15,700	67.5	+2.0
Labor	Antony Kelly	7,551	32.5	−2.0
Liberal hold		Swing	+2.0	

==== 1965 ====
1965 New South Wales state election: Burwood
Party	Candidate	Votes	%	±%
Liberal	John Jackett	10,125	42.9	−18.7
Labor	Norman Newey	6,806	28.8	−9.6
Independent	Ben Doig	6,672	28.3	+28.3
Total formal votes		23,603	98.1	−0.2
Informal votes		463	1.9	+0.2
Turnout		24,066	92.4	+0.8
Two-party-preferred result
Liberal	John Jackett	15,734	66.7	+5.1
Labor	Norman Newey	7,869	33.3	−5.1
Liberal hold		Swing	+5.1	

- Ben Doig was the sitting Liberal member for Burwood, however he lost pre-selection which he blamed on his support for state aid to church schools.

==== 1962 ====
1962 New South Wales state election: Burwood
Party	Candidate	Votes	%	±%
Liberal	Ben Doig	14,862	61.6	0.0
Labor	Doug Sutherland	9,272	38.4	0.0
Total formal votes		24,134	98.3	
Informal votes		407	1.7	
Turnout		24,541	91.6	
Liberal hold		Swing	0.0	

=== Elections in the 1950s ===
==== 1959 ====
1959 New South Wales state election: Burwood
Party	Candidate	Votes	%	±%
Liberal	Ben Doig	13,413	61.6	
Labor	John Cunningham	8,375	38.4	
Total formal votes		21,788	97.6	
Informal votes		525	2.4	
Turnout		22,313	92.2	
Liberal hold		Swing		

==== 1957 by-election ====
1957 Burwood by-election Saturday 16 February
Party	Candidate	Votes	%	±%
Liberal	Ben Doig	8,414	45.8	
Democratic Labor	Maurice Colreavy	3,815	20.8	
Independent Liberal	Henry Seldon	2,951	16.1	
Independent Labor	John Cunningham	2,748	15.0	
Independent	Edward Spensley	431	2.4	
Total formal votes		18,359	97.3	
Informal votes		514	2.7	
Turnout		18,873	84.9	
Liberal hold		Swing	N/A	

Leslie Parr (Liberal) died.

==== 1956 ====
1956 New South Wales state election: Burwood
Party	Candidate	Votes	%	±%
Liberal	Leslie Parr	unopposed		
Liberal hold				

==== 1953 ====
1953 New South Wales state election: Burwood
Party	Candidate	Votes	%	±%
Liberal	Leslie Parr	12,411	57.1	
Labor	William Weiss	9,311	42.9	
Total formal votes		21,722	98.7	
Informal votes		278	1.3	
Turnout		22,000	93.2	
Liberal hold		Swing		

==== 1951 by-election ====
1951 Burwood by-election Saturday 2 June
Party	Candidate	Votes	%	±%
Liberal	Leslie Parr	11,045	52.6	−5.4
Labor	Cliff Mallam	7,783	37.1	
Independent	Rex Reynolds	2,168	10.3	
Total formal votes		20,996	99.0	+3.9
Informal votes		210	1.0	−3.9
Turnout		21,206	85.9	−6.5
Liberal hold		Swing	N/A	

Gordon Jackett (Liberal) died.

==== 1950 ====
1950 New South Wales state election: Burwood
Party	Candidate	Votes	%	±%
Liberal	Gordon Jackett	12,587	58.0	
Independent	Harrie Mitchell	9,122	42.0	
Total formal votes		21,709	95.1	
Informal votes		1,114	4.9	
Turnout		22,823	92.4	
Liberal hold		Swing		

=== Elections in the 1940s ===
==== 1947 ====
1947 New South Wales state election: Burwood
Party	Candidate	Votes	%	±%
Liberal	Gordon Jackett	14,216	60.3	+21.7
Labor	George Russell	9,361	39.7	+5.5
Total formal votes		23,577	98.7	+2.2
Informal votes		305	1.3	−2.2
Turnout		23,882	95.2	+1.4
Liberal hold		Swing	+7.9	

==== 1944 ====
1944 New South Wales state election: Burwood
Party	Candidate	Votes	%	±%
Democratic	Gordon Jackett	8,253	38.6	+9.8
Labor	Cliff Mallam	7,310	34.2	−4.7
Communist	Stanley Coulton	3,010	14.1	+14.1
Liberal Democratic	Keith Sutherland	2,802	13.1	+13.1
Total formal votes		21,375	96.5	−1.6
Informal votes		780	3.5	+1.6
Turnout		22,155	93.8	+0.1
Two-party-preferred result
Democratic	Gordon Jackett	11,205	52.4	+52.4
Labor	Cliff Mallam	10,170	47.6	+6.3
Member changed to Democratic from Ind. United Australia		Swing	N/A	

- Gordon Jackett had been elected at the previous election as an Independent UAP candidate, and held the seat as a Democratic member.

==== 1941 ====
1941 New South Wales state election: Burwood
Party	Candidate	Votes	%	±%
Labor	Albert Thompson	7,950	38.9	
Ind. United Australia	Gordon Jackett	6,620	32.4	
United Australia	Harrie Mitchell	5,882	28.8	
Total formal votes		20,452	98.1	
Informal votes		386	1.9	
Turnout		20,838	93.7	
Two-candidate-preferred result
Ind. United Australia	Gordon Jackett	11,997	58.7	
Labor	Albert Thompson	8,455	41.3	
Ind. United Australia gain from United Australia		Swing		

=== Elections in the 1930s ===
==== 1938 ====
1938 New South Wales state election: Burwood
Party	Candidate	Votes	%	±%
United Australia	Harrie Mitchell	9,199	51.0	+51.0
United Australia	Gordon Jackett	8,853	49.0	−13.4
Total formal votes		18,052	92.3	−6.2
Informal votes		1,503	7.7	+6.2
Turnout		19,555	95.6	−0.9
United Australia hold		Swing	N/A	

==== 1935 ====
1935 New South Wales state election: Burwood
Party	Candidate	Votes	%	±%
United Australia	Gordon Jackett	11,316	62.4	−1.4
Labor (NSW)	Arthur Dowd	5,035	27.8	−5.0
Independent	George Bland	1,792	9.9	+9.9
Total formal votes		18,143	98.5	−0.5
Informal votes		270	1.5	+0.5
Turnout		18,413	96.5	+0.5
United Australia hold		Swing	N/A	

- Preferences were not distributed.

==== 1932 ====
1932 New South Wales state election: Burwood
Party	Candidate	Votes	%	±%
United Australia	Thomas Henley	11,523	63.8	+19.6
Labor (NSW)	Horace Foley	5,930	32.8	−6.4
Ind. United Australia	Abraham Taylor	602	3.3	+3.3
Total formal votes		18,055	99.0	+1.5
Informal votes		183	1.0	−1.5
Turnout		18,238	96.0	−0.3
United Australia hold		Swing	N/A	

- Preferences were not distributed.

==== 1930 ====
1930 New South Wales state election: Burwood
Party	Candidate	Votes	%	±%
Nationalist	Thomas Henley	7,821	44.2	
Labor	Francis Miller	6,937	39.2	
Australian	Stan Lloyd	2,813	15.9	
Communist	Frank Dodds	128	0.7	
Total formal votes		17,699	97.5	
Informal votes		460	2.5	
Turnout		18,159	96.3	
Two-party-preferred result
Nationalist	Thomas Henley	9,183	51.9	
Labor	Francis Miller	8,516	48.1	
Nationalist hold		Swing		

=== Elections in the 1920s ===
==== 1927 ====
1927 New South Wales state election: Burwood
Party	Candidate	Votes	%	±%
Nationalist	Thomas Henley	8,555	69.2	
Labor	Henry Joyce	2,858	23.1	
Independent	Harry Beach	949	7.7	
Total formal votes		12,362	99.0	
Informal votes		121	1.0	
Turnout		12,483	80.4	
Nationalist win		(new seat)		

==== 1920 - 1927 ====
District abolished

=== Elections in the 1910s ===
==== 1917 ====
1917 New South Wales state election: Burwood
Party	Candidate	Votes	%	±%
Nationalist	Thomas Henley	7,125	77.0	+9.5
Labor	Arthur Apsey	2,122	23.0	−9.5
Total formal votes		9,247	99.1	+1.8
Informal votes		83	0.9	−1.8
Turnout		9,330	60.1	−8.3
Nationalist hold		Swing	+9.5	

==== 1913 ====
1913 New South Wales state election: Burwood
Party	Candidate	Votes	%	±%
Liberal Reform	Thomas Henley	5,680	67.5	
Labor	William Hocking	2,728	32.5	
Total formal votes		8,408	97.3	
Informal votes		235	2.7	
Turnout		8,643	68.4	
Liberal Reform hold				

==== 1910 ====
1910 New South Wales state election: Burwood
Party	Candidate	Votes	%	±%
Liberal Reform	Thomas Henley	5,563	62.6	
Labour	Thomas Tytherleigh	3,325	37.4	
Total formal votes		8,888	98.5	
Informal votes		139	1.5	
Turnout		9,027	74.8	
Liberal Reform hold				

=== Elections in the 1900s ===
==== 1907 ====
1907 New South Wales state election: Burwood
Party	Candidate	Votes	%	±%
Liberal Reform	Thomas Henley	3,948	55.2	
Labour	Thomas Tytherleigh	1,503	21.0	
Independent	William Archer	1,103	15.4	
Independent	Stapleton Rodd	600	8.4	
Total formal votes		7,154	97.3	
Informal votes		197	2.7	
Turnout		7,351	74.4	
Liberal Reform hold				

==== 1904 ====
1904 New South Wales state election: Burwood
Party	Candidate	Votes	%	±%
Liberal Reform	Thomas Henley	3,265	58.5	
Independent	William Archer	2,299	41.2	
Independent	Harry McConnell	20	0.4	
Total formal votes		5,584	99.3	
Informal votes		38	0.7	
Turnout		5,622	64.0	
Liberal Reform gain from Independent				

Burwood was expanded to include part of Ashfield. The member for Burwood was William Archer (Independent). The member for Ashfield was Frederick Winchcombe (Liberal Reform) who successfully contested that electorate.

==== 1901 ====
1901 New South Wales state election: Burwood
Party	Candidate	Votes	%	±%
Independent	William Archer	1,084	64.6	+15.9
Liberal Reform	Alexander Ralston	594	35.4	
Total formal votes		1,678	99.4	−
Informal votes		10	0.6	−
Turnout		1,688	65.3	+2.8
Independent hold				

=== Elections in the 1890s ===
==== 1898 ====
1898 New South Wales colonial election: Burwood
Party	Candidate	Votes	%	±%
Ind. Free Trade	William Archer	700	48.7	
National Federal	William McMillan	647	45.0	
Ind. Free Trade	James Eve	90	6.3	
Total formal votes		1,437	99.5	
Informal votes		8	0.6	
Turnout		1,445	62.5	
Ind. Free Trade gain from Free Trade				

William McMillan had been elected as a Free Trade member, but changed to National Federal for this election.

==== 1895 ====
1895 New South Wales colonial election: Burwood
Party	Candidate	Votes	%	±%
Free Trade	William McMillan	730	62.5	
Ind. Free Trade	William Archer	439	37.6	
Total formal votes		1,169	99.2	
Informal votes		10	0.9	
Turnout		1,179	60.4	
Free Trade hold				

==== 1894 ====
1894 New South Wales colonial election: Burwood
Party	Candidate	Votes	%	±%
Free Trade	William McMillan	932	56.9	
Labour	John Quinnen	340	20.7	
Ind. Free Trade	Griffith Russell-Jones	192	11.7	
Ind. Free Trade	William Dumbrell	82	5.0	
Protectionist	Frederick Gipps	58	3.5	
Ind. Free Trade	Adam Pringle	35	2.1	
Total formal votes		1,639	99.3	
Informal votes		12	0.7	
Turnout		1,651	82.7	
Free Trade win		(new seat)		
