= Members of the New South Wales Legislative Assembly, 1950–1953 =

Members of the New South Wales Legislative Assembly who served in the 36th parliament held their seats from 1950 to 1953. They were elected at the 1950 state election, and at by-elections. The Speaker was Bill Lamb.

Name	Party	Electorate	Term in office
John Adamson	Liberal	Concord	1950–1953
Ken Anderson	Liberal	Ryde	1950–1953
Joshua Arthur	Labor	Kahibah	1935–1953
Robert Askin	Liberal	Collaroy	1950–1975
Jack Beale	Liberal	South Coast	1942–1973
Ivan Black (Note: Neutral Bay Liberal MLA Ivan Black resigned on 20 March 1951 in order to contest preselection for the federal seat of Warringah at the 1951 election. He was unsuccessful, and was re-elected unopposed to his state seat on 21 May 1951.)	Liberal	Neutral Bay	1945–1951, 1951–1962
George Booth	Labor	Kurri Kurri	1925–1960
George Brain	Liberal	Willoughby	1943–1968
Michael Bruxner	Country	Tenterfield	1920–1962
Fred Cahill	Labor	Young	1941–1959
Joe Cahill	Labor	Cook's River	1925–1959
Robert Cameron	Labor	Waratah	1927–1956
George Campbell	Labor	Hamilton	1950–1959
Bill Chaffey	Country	Tamworth	1940–1973
Jim Chalmers (Note: Hartley MLA Jim Chalmers resigned from the Labor Party in 1952 after a dispute with the party's state executive. He served out his term as an independent.)	Labor / Independent Labor	Hartley	1947–1956
Daniel Clyne	Labor	King	1927–1956
Frederick Cooke	Country	Mudgee	1950–1953
Rex Connor	Labor	Wollongong-Kembla	1950–1963
Geoff Crawford	Country	Barwon	1950–1976
John Crook	Labor	Cessnock	1949–1959
Douglas Cross	Liberal	Kogarah	1948–1953, 1956–1970
Charles Cutler	Country	Orange	1947–1975
Douglas Darby	Liberal	Manly	1945–1978
Bernie Deane	Liberal	Hawkesbury	1950–1972
Robert Dewley	Liberal	Drummoyne	1947–1953
Doug Dickson	Country	Temora	1938–1960
Edgar Dring	Labor	Auburn	1941–1955
Kevin Ellis	Liberal	Coogee	1948–1953, 1956–1962, 1965–1973
George Enticknap	Labor	Murrumbidgee	1941–1965
Clive Evatt	Labor	Hurstville	1939–1959
Frank Finnan	Labor	Darlinghurst	1941–1953
Ray Fitzgerald	Country	Gloucester	1941–1962
Howard Fowles	Labor	Illawarra	1941–1968
John Freeman	Labor	Blacktown	1945–1959
William Frith	Country	Lismore	1933–1953
James Geraghty	Independent Labor	North Sydney	1941–1953
George Gollan	Liberal	Parramatta	1932–1953
William Gollan	Labor	Randwick	1941–1962
Eddie Graham	Labor	Wagga Wagga	1941–1957
Fred Green	Labor	Redfern	1950–1968
Arthur Greenup	Labor	Newtown-Annandale	1950–1953
Frank Hawkins	Labor	Newcastle	1935–1968
Eric Hearnshaw	Liberal	Eastwood	1945–1965
Robert Heffron	Labor	Maroubra	1930–1968
Walter Howarth	Liberal	Maitland	1932–1956
Davis Hughes	Country	Armidale	1950–1953, 1956–1973
David Hunter	Liberal	Croydon	1940–1976
Gordon Jackett (Note: Burwood Liberal MLA Gordon Jackett died on 3 March 1951. Liberal candidate Leslie Parr won the resulting by-election on 2 June 1951.)	Liberal	Burwood	1935–1951
Harold Jackson	Liberal	Gosford	1950–1965
Joseph Jackson	Liberal	Nepean	1922–1956
Les Jordan	Country	Oxley	1944–1965
Gus Kelly	Labor	Bathurst	1925–1932, 1935–1967
Laurie Kelly	Labor	Bulli	1947–1955
Bill Lamb	Labor	Granville	1938–1962
Abe Landa	Labor	Bondi	1930–1965
Joe Lawson	Country	Murray	1932–1973
Carlo Lazzarini	Labor	Marrickville	1917–1952
Jack Mannix (Note: Liverpool Labor MLA James McGirr resigned to take up an appointment as chair of the Maritime Services Board on 3 April 1952. Labor candidate Jack Mannix won the resulting by-election on 24 May.)	Labor	Liverpool	1952–1971
Clarrie Martin	Labor	Waverley	1930–1932, 1939–1953
Claude Matthews	Labor	Leichhardt	1934–1954
Ken McCaw	Liberal	Lane Cove	1947–1975
Jim McGirr	Labor	Liverpool	1922–1952
John McGrath	Labor	Rockdale	1941–1959
John McMahon	Labor	Balmain	1950–1968
Robert Medcalf	Country	Dubbo	1947–1953
Cecil Monro	Liberal	Sutherland	1932–1941, 1950–1953
Pat Morton	Liberal	Mosman	1947–1972
Roger Nott	Labor	Liverpool Plains	1941–1961
Maurice O'Sullivan	Labor	Paddington	1927–1959
Doug Padman	Liberal	Albury	1947–1965
Leslie Parr	Liberal	Burwood	1951–1956
Blake Pelly	Liberal	Wollondilly	1950–1957
Spence Powell	Labor	Bankstown	1950–1962
John Reid	Country	Casino	1930–1953
Jack Renshaw	Labor	Castlereagh	1941–1980
Athol Richardson (Note: Ashfield Liberal MLA Athol Richardson resigned on 29 April 1952 in order to take up an appointment to the Supreme Court of New South Wales. Labor candidate Jack Richardson won the resulting by-election on 28 June.)	Liberal	Ashfield	1935–1946, 1946–1952
Jack Richardson	Labor	Ashfield	1952–1953
Murray Robson	Liberal	Vaucluse	1936–1957
D'Arcy Rose	Country	Upper Hunter	1939–1959
John Seiffert (Note: Monaro MLA John Seiffert won re-election in 1950 as an independent after being expelled prior to the election, but was readmitted to the Labor caucus.)	Independent Labor / Labor	Monaro	1941–1965
Tom Shannon	Labor	Phillip	1927–1954
Bill Sheahan	Labor	Burrinjuck	1941–1973
Jim Simpson	Labor	Lake Macquarie	1950–1968
Stanley Stephens	Country	Byron	1944–1973
Sydney Storey	Liberal	Hornsby	1941–1962
Arthur Tonge	Labor	Canterbury	1926–1932, 1935–1962
Vernon Treatt	Liberal	Woollahra	1938–1962
Laurie Tully	Labor	Goulburn	1946–1965
Harry Turner	Liberal	Gordon	1937–1952
Roy Vincent	Country	Raleigh	1922–1953
William Wattison	Labor	Sturt	1947–1968
George Weir	Labor	Dulwich Hill	1941–1953
Ernest Wetherell	Labor	Cobar	1949–1965
Arthur Williams	Labor	Georges River	1940–1956
Eric Willis	Liberal	Earlwood	1950–1978
Cecil Wingfield	Country	Clarence	1938–1955
Stan Wyatt	Labor	Lakemba	1950–1964

== See also ==
- Third McGirr ministry
- First Cahill ministry
- Results of the 1950 New South Wales state election
- Candidates of the 1950 New South Wales state election
