= Candidates of the 1950 New South Wales state election =

This is a list of candidates of the 1950 New South Wales state election. The election was held on 17 June 1950.

== Retiring Members ==
=== Labor ===
- Bill Dunn (Mudgee)
- Kevin Dwyer (Redfern) — lost preselection
- Bob Gorman (Annandale) — lost preselection for Newtown-Annandale
- Baden Powell (Wollongong-Kembla) — lost preselection

== Legislative Assembly ==
Sitting members are shown in bold text. Successful candidates are highlighted in the relevant colour.

Electorate	Held by	Labor candidate	Coalition candidate	Other candidates
Albury	Liberal	John Hurley	**Doug Padman** (Lib)	
Armidale	Country	Jim Cahill	**Davis Hughes** (CP)	Edward Spensley (Ind)
Ashfield	Liberal	Ernest Grove	**Athol Richardson** (Lib)	
Auburn	Lang Labor	**Edgar Dring**	Jim Dennison (Lib)	Alexander Kerr (Ind); Roy Kirby (CPA); **Chris Lang** (LL)
Balmain	Labor	John McMahon	Frederick Mann (Lib)	Tom Dowling (CPA); Malinda Ivey (Ind); **Mary Quirk** (Ind Lab)
Bankstown	Labor	Spence Powell	Blanche Barkl (Lib)	
Barwon	Labor	Norman Ferguson	Geoff Crawford (CP)	**Roy Heferen** (Ind Lab)
Barwon	Labor	Norman Ferguson	William McKechnie (Lib)	**Roy Heferen** (Ind Lab)
Bathurst	Labor	**Gus Kelly**	Basil Genders (Lib); Allan Harding (CP)	
Blacktown	Labor	**John Freeman**	Nancy Saxby (Lib)	
Bondi	Labor	**Abe Landa**	Keith Weekes (Lib)	
Bulli	Labor	**Laurie Kelly**	Leslie Strachan (Lib)	John Martin (CPA)
Burrinjuck	New seat	**Bill Sheahan**	William Ross (CP)	
Burwood	Liberal		**Gordon Jackett** (Lib)	Harrie Mitchell (Ind)
Byron	Country		**Stanley Stephens** (CP)	
Canterbury	Labor	**Arthur Tonge**	Robert Bruce (Lib)	
Casino	Country	Alexander Bryen	**John Reid** (CP)	
Castlereagh	Labor	**Jack Renshaw**	John Campbell (Lib); Noel Knight (CP); Edward Langbien (CP)	
Cessnock	Labor	**John Crook**		John Tapp (CPA)
Clarence	Country		**Cecil Wingfield** (CP)	
Cobar	Labor	**Ernest Wetherell**	Frederick Harding (CP)	
Collaroy	New seat	John Masters	Robert Askin (Lib)	
Concord	Liberal	Thomas Murphy	**John Adamson** (Lib)	
Coogee	Liberal	Lou Walsh	**Kevin Ellis** (Lib)	
Cook's River	Labor	**Joseph Cahill**	Donald Clark (Lib)	Henry McPhillips (Ind)
Croydon	Liberal		**David Hunter** (Lib)	
Darlinghurst	New seat	**Frank Finnan**	John Paget (Lib)	Adam Ogston (CPA)
Drummoyne	Liberal	Charles Halliday	**Robert Dewley** (Lib)	
Dubbo	Labor	**Clarrie Robertson**	**Robert Medcalf*** (CP); Joseph Roach (Lib)	Madge Roberts (Ind)
Dulwich Hill	Labor	**George Weir**	Leslie Parr (Lib)	
Earlwood	New seat	Arthur Higgins	Eric Willis (Lib)	
Eastwood	New seat	John Birchall	**Eric Hearnshaw** (Lib)	
George's River	Labor	**Arthur Williams**	Charles Little (Lib)	
Gloucester	Country	Edward Robb	**Ray Fitzgerald** (CP)	William McCristal (Ind)
Gloucester	Country	Edward Robb	Bruce Cowan (CP); Roderick Richardson (Lib)	William McCristal (Ind)
Gordon	Liberal		**Harry Turner** (Lib)	
Gosford	New seat	John Egan	Harold Jackson (Lib)	George Downes (Ind); Walter Lloyd (Ind); Jack Parks (Ind)
Gosford	New seat	John Egan	William Wright (CP)	George Downes (Ind); Walter Lloyd (Ind); Jack Parks (Ind)
Goulburn	Labor	**Laurie Tully**	Hubert O'Connell (Lib)	
Granville	Labor	**Bill Lamb**	William Campbell (Lib)	
Hamilton	Labor	George Campbell	Harry Quinlan (Lib)	Oscar Newton (Ind)
Hartley	Labor	**Jim Chalmers**	James Cripps (Lib)	John King (CPA)
Hawkesbury	Liberal		Bernie Deane (Lib)	Herbert Daley (Ind)
Hawkesbury	Liberal		Greg McGirr (CP)	Herbert Daley (Ind)
Hornsby	Liberal	Roy Shirvington	**Sydney Storey** (Lib)	
Hurstville	Labor	**Clive Evatt**	Leslie Webster (Lib)	
Illawarra	Labor	**Howard Fowles**	Lindsay Maynes (Lib)	
Kahibah	New seat	**Joshua Arthur**	William Bourke (Lib)	
King	Labor	**Daniel Clyne**	Roberta Galagher (Lib)	Horace Foley (LL); Clare Peters (Ind)
Kogarah	Liberal	Bill Crabtree	**Douglas Cross** (Lib)	
Kurri Kurri	Labor	**George Booth**		Nellie Simm (CPA)
Lake Macquarie	New seat	Jim Simpson	John Wilkins (Lib)	
Lakemba	Labor	Stan Wyatt	Samuel Warren (Lib)	Roy Boyd (CPA); **Fred Stanley** (Ind Lab)
Lane Cove	Liberal	Hugh Milne	**Ken McCaw** (Lib)	
Leichhardt	Labor	**Claude Matthews**	Charles Shields (Lib)	Arthur Doughty (Ind)
Lismore	Country	Francis Fredericks	**William Frith** (CP)	
Liverpool	New seat	**James McGirr**	Bernard Fitzpatrick (Lib)	Don Syme (CPA)
Liverpool Plains	Labor	**Roger Nott**	Keith Mitchell (Lib); Frank O'Keefe (CP)	
Maitland	Liberal	Kevin Barlow	**Walter Howarth** (Lib)	
Manly	Liberal		**Douglas Darby** (Lib)	Charles Scharkie (Ind Lib)
Maroubra	New seat	**Bob Heffron**	Philip Goldman (Lib)	
Marrickville	Labor	**Carlo Lazzarini**	Basil Mottershead (Lib)	
Monaro	Labor		Bill Keys (Lib)	**John Seiffert** (Ind Lab)
Mosman	Liberal	Allan Matthews	**Pat Morton** (Lib)	
Mudgee	Labor	John Breen	Frederick Cooke (CP)	
Mudgee	Labor	John Breen	Norman Horne (Lib)	
Murray	Country	James Flood	**Joe Lawson** (CP)	
Murray	Country	James Flood	**Ebenezer Kendell** (CP)	
Murrumbidgee	Labor	**George Enticknap**	John Oag (Lib); Alfred Yeo (CP)	
Nepean	Liberal		**Joseph Jackson** (Lib)	Allan Taylor (Ind)
Neutral Bay	Liberal	Frank McCullum	**Ivan Black** (Lib)	
Newcastle	Labor	**Frank Hawkins**	Eric Cupit (Lib)	Laurie Aarons (CPA)
Newtown-Annandale	New seat	Arthur Greenup		**Lilian Fowler** (LL); Daisy Lewin (CPA)
North Sydney	Labor	Ray Maher	Bjarne Halvorsen (Lib)	**James Geraghty** (Ind Lab)
Orange	Country	Francis Hoy	**Charles Cutler** (CP)	
Oxley	Country	William Baker	**Les Jordan** (CP)	
Paddington	Labor	**Maurice O'Sullivan**	Bob Mutton (Lib)	Phyllis Johnson (CPA)
Parramatta	Liberal	Louis O'Neil	**George Gollan** (Lib)	
Phillip	Labor	**Tom Shannon**	Henry Clarke (Lib)	
Raleigh	Country		**Roy Vincent** (CP)	
Randwick	Labor	**William Gollan**	Gerald Davis (Lib)	
Redfern	Labor	Fred Green	Phillip Pethers (Lib)	Frederick Fairbrother (Ind Lab); Mervyn Pidcock (CPA)
Rockdale	Labor	**John McGrath**	George McGuire (Lib)	
Ryde	Liberal	Frank Downing	Ken Anderson (Lib)	
South Coast	Liberal	Alfred Berriman	**Jack Beale** (Lib)	
Sturt	Labor	**William Wattison**		
Sutherland	New seat	Gough Whitlam	Cecil Monro (Lib)	
Tamworth	Country		**Bill Chaffey** (CP)	
Temora	Country		**Doug Dickson** (CP)	
Tenterfield	Country		**Michael Bruxner** (CP)	Ben Wade (Ind CP)
Upper Hunter	Country	Leonard Neville	**D'Arcy Rose** (CP)	
Vaucluse	Liberal	Harold Levien	**Murray Robson** (Lib)	Tasman Crocker (Ind Lib)
Wagga Wagga	Labor	**Eddie Graham**	Richard Blamey (CP); Ivan Jack (Lib)	
Waratah	Labor	**Robert Cameron**	Harold Hollis (Lib)	
Waverley	Labor	**Clarrie Martin**	Ross McKinnon (Lib)	
Willoughby	Liberal	Brian White	**George Brain** (Lib)	
Wollondilly	Liberal		**Blake Pelly** (Lib)	Erle Sampson (Ind); Gerald Wylie (Ind)
Wollongong-Kembla	Labor	Rex Connor	Gerald Sargent (Lib)	Henry Graham (Ind)
Woollahra	Liberal	William Harcourt	**Vernon Treatt** (Lib)	
Young	Labor	**Fred Cahill**	Douglas Beard (CP); Percy Richardson (Lib)	

== See also ==
- Members of the New South Wales Legislative Assembly, 1950–1953
