= Electoral results for the Division of Dalley =

This is a list of electoral results for the Division of Dalley in Australian federal elections from the division's creation in 1901 until its abolition in 1969.

== Members ==
Member	Party	Term
William Wilks	Free Trade, Anti-Socialist	1901–1909
William Wilks	Liberal	1909–1910
Robert Howe	Labor	1910–1915
William Mahony	Labor	1915–1927
Ted Theodore	Labor	1927–1931
Sol Rosevear	Labor (NSW)	1931–1936
Sol Rosevear	Labor	1936–1940
Sol Rosevear	Labor (N-C)	1940–1941
Sol Rosevear	Labor	1941–1953
Arthur Greenup	Labor	1953–1955
William O'Connor	Labor	1955–1969

== Election results ==
=== Elections in the 1960s ===
==== 1966 ====
1966 Australian federal election: Dalley
Party	Candidate	Votes	%	±%
Labor	William O'Connor	18,938	61.0	−11.9
Liberal	Elton Lewis	9,709	31.3	+31.3
Democratic Labor	John Kavanagh	2,377	7.7	−19.4
Total formal votes		31,024	95.1	
Informal votes		1,615	4.9	
Turnout		32,639	93.4	
Two-party-preferred result
Labor	William O'Connor		62.3	−10.6
Liberal	Elton Lewis		37.7	+37.7
Labor hold		Swing	−10.6	

==== 1963 ====
1963 Australian federal election: Dalley
Party	Candidate	Votes	%	±%
Labor	William O'Connor	24,553	72.9	+1.9
Democratic Labor	Peter Keogh	9,118	27.1	+20.2
Total formal votes		33,671	96.2	
Informal votes		1,333	3.8	
Turnout		35,004	93.6	
Labor hold		Swing	−2.4	

==== 1961 ====
1961 Australian federal election: Dalley
Party	Candidate	Votes	%	±%
Labor	William O'Connor	24,127	71.0	+0.0
Liberal	Arthur Nesbitt	6,343	18.7	−10.3
Democratic Labor	Reginald Lawson	2,331	6.9	+6.9
Communist	Mavis Robertson	1,172	3.4	+3.4
Total formal votes		33,973	95.9	
Informal votes		1,464	4.1	
Turnout		35,437	94.1	
Two-party-preferred result
Labor	William O'Connor		75.3	+4.3
Liberal	Arthur Nesbitt		24.7	−4.3
Labor hold		Swing	+4.3	

=== Elections in the 1950s ===
==== 1958 ====
1958 Australian federal election: Dalley
Party	Candidate	Votes	%	±%
Labor	William O'Connor	26,081	71.0	−0.9
Liberal	Elton Lewis	10,664	29.0	+6.8
Total formal votes		36,745	96.3	
Informal votes		1,430	3.7	
Turnout		38,175	93.5	
Labor hold		Swing	−6.2	

==== 1955 ====
1955 Australian federal election: Dalley
Party	Candidate	Votes	%	±%
Labor	William O'Connor	28,913	71.9	+0.2
Liberal	Stanley Tyler	8,933	22.2	−0.9
Communist	Ernie Thornton	2,377	5.9	+0.8
Total formal votes		40,223	96.4	
Informal votes		1,482	3.6	
Turnout		41,705	94.5	
Two-party-preferred result
Labor	William O'Connor		77.2	+0.9
Liberal	Stanley Tyler		22.8	−0.9
Labor hold		Swing	+0.9	

==== 1954 ====
1954 Australian federal election: Dalley
Party	Candidate	Votes	%	±%
Labor	Arthur Greenup	24,292	71.6	+4.5
Liberal	Robert Stafford	7,810	23.0	−9.9
Communist	Flo Davis	1,803	5.3	+5.3
Total formal votes		33,905	98.3	
Informal votes		594	1.7	
Turnout		34,499	95.4	
Two-party-preferred result
Labor	Arthur Greenup		76.6	+9.5
Liberal	Robert Stafford		23.4	−9.5
Labor hold		Swing	+9.5	

==== 1953 ====
1953 Dalley by-election
Party	Candidate	Votes	%	±%
Labor	Arthur Greenup	23,812	70.5	+3.4
Independent	William Cole	8,285	24.5	+24.5
Independent	John Sheean	1,667	4.9	+4.9
Total formal votes		33,764	95.4	
Informal votes		1,618	4.6	
Turnout		35,382	93.8	
Two-party-preferred result
Labor	Arthur Greenup		75.0	+7.9
Independent	William Cole		25.0	+25.0
Labor hold		Swing	+7.9	

==== 1951 ====
1951 Australian federal election: Dalley
Party	Candidate	Votes	%	±%
Labor	Sol Rosevear	24,851	67.1	−5.9
Liberal	John Laffin	12,204	32.9	+5.9
Total formal votes		37,055	97.7	
Informal votes		877	2.3	
Turnout		37,932	96.0	
Labor hold		Swing	−5.9	

=== Elections in the 1940s ===
==== 1949 ====
1949 Australian federal election: Dalley
Party	Candidate	Votes	%	±%
Labor	Sol Rosevear	27,501	73.0	+9.6
Liberal	Charles Shields	10,190	27.0	−2.9
Total formal votes		37,691	97.1	
Informal votes		1,111	2.9	
Turnout		38,802	96.6	
Labor hold		Swing	+3.3	

==== 1946 ====
1946 Australian federal election: Dalley
Party	Candidate	Votes	%	±%
Labor	Sol Rosevear	38,571	63.4	−11.4
Liberal	Leslie Webster	14,674	24.1	+24.1
Lang Labor	Kenneth Falvey	7,549	12.4	+12.4
Total formal votes		60,794	97.5	
Informal votes		1,531	2.5	
Turnout		62,325	94.8	
Two-party-preferred result
Labor	Sol Rosevear		73.7	−7.4
Liberal	Leslie Webster		26.3	+26.3
Labor hold		Swing	−7.4	

==== 1943 ====
1943 Australian federal election: Dalley
Party	Candidate	Votes	%	±%
Labor	Sol Rosevear	44,127	74.8	+41.3
One Parliament	Ernest de Faria	10,760	18.2	+18.2
Communist	Lance Sharkey	4,087	6.9	+6.9
Total formal votes		58,974	96.9	
Informal votes		1,864	3.1	
Turnout		60,838	98.0	
Two-party-preferred result
Labor	Sol Rosevear		81.1	+38.3
One Parliament	Ernest de Faria		18.9	+18.9
Labor gain from Labor (N-C)		Swing	+38.3	

==== 1940 ====
1940 Australian federal election: Dalley
Party	Candidate	Votes	%	±%
Labor (N-C)	Sol Rosevear	20,721	37.2	+37.2
Labor	Donald Cochrane	18,643	33.5	−24.2
United Australia	Hubert O'Connell	14,736	26.5	−15.8
State Labor	Edmund Ryan	1,564	2.8	+2.8
Total formal votes		55,664	97.5	
Informal votes		1,423	2.5	
Turnout		57,087	95.6	
Two-party-preferred result
Labor (N-C)	Sol Rosevear	31,842	57.2	+57.2
Labor	Donald Cochrane	23,822	42.8	−14.9
Labor (N-C) gain from Labor		Swing	+14.9	

=== Elections in the 1930s ===
==== 1937 ====
1937 Australian federal election: Dalley
Party	Candidate	Votes	%	±%
Labor	Sol Rosevear	32,646	57.7	+51.0
United Australia	Arthur Brough	23,961	42.3	+4.0
Total formal votes		56,607	97.7	
Informal votes		1,305	2.3	
Turnout		57,912	96.9	
Labor gain from Labor (NSW)		Swing	−0.1	

==== 1934 ====
1934 Australian federal election: Dalley
Party	Candidate	Votes	%	±%
Labor (NSW)	Sol Rosevear	25,881	48.0	+9.5
United Australia	William Nicol	20,655	38.3	−1.3
Labor	William Thompson	3,591	6.7	−13.6
Social Credit	Henry Giles	2,079	3.9	+3.9
Independent Labor	Jervis Blackman	997	1.8	+1.8
Communist	James McPhee	689	1.3	+0.8
Total formal votes		53,892	94.5	
Informal votes		3,151	5.5	
Turnout		57,043	96.7	
Two-party-preferred result
Labor (NSW)	Sol Rosevear		57.8	+3.1
United Australia	William Nicol		42.2	−3.1
Labor (NSW) hold		Swing	+3.1	

==== 1931 ====
1931 Australian federal election: Dalley
Party	Candidate	Votes	%	±%
Labor (NSW)	Sol Rosevear	17,835	48.0	+48.0
United Australia	Sidney Massey	10,459	28.2	+6.1
Labor	Ted Theodore	7,272	19.6	−58.3
Ind. Nationalist	William Little	902	2.4	+2.4
Communist	Jack Sylvester	671	1.8	+1.8
Total formal votes		37,139	92.9	
Informal votes		2,832	7.1	
Turnout		39,971	95.9	
Two-party-preferred result
Labor (NSW)	Sol Rosevear	23,784	64.0	+64.0
United Australia	Sidney Massey	13,355	36.0	+8.9
Labor (NSW) gain from Labor		Swing	−8.9	

=== Elections in the 1920s ===
==== 1929 ====
1929 Australian federal election: Dalley
Party	Candidate	Votes	%	±%
Labor	Ted Theodore	31,276	77.9	+13.7
Nationalist	Thomas Morrow	8,870	22.1	+1.8
Total formal votes		40,146	97.3	
Informal votes		1,126	2.7	
Turnout		41,272	96.2	
Labor hold		Swing	+3.6	

==== 1928 ====
1928 Australian federal election: Dalley
Party	Candidate	Votes	%	±%
Labor	Ted Theodore	24,328	64.2	+0.1
Nationalist	Hedley Rogers	7,704	20.3	−15.6
Independent Labor	Albert Gardiner	5,888	15.5	+15.5
Total formal votes		37,920	94.2	
Informal votes		2,319	5.8	
Turnout		40,239	95.7	
Two-party-preferred result
Labor	Ted Theodore		69.3	+5.2
Nationalist	Hedley Rogers		30.7	−5.2
Labor hold		Swing	+5.2	

==== 1927 ====
1927 Dalley by-election
Party	Candidate	Votes	%	±%
Labor	Ted Theodore	21,186	62.6	−1.5
Nationalist	Walter Gee	12,667	37.4	+1.5
Total formal votes		33,853	93.1	
Informal votes		2,517	6.9	
Turnout		36,370	89.3	
Labor hold		Swing	−1.5	

==== 1925 ====
1925 Australian federal election: Dalley
Party	Candidate	Votes	%	±%
Labor	William Mahony	24,455	64.1	−2.6
Nationalist	James Thomson	13,702	35.9	+11.0
Total formal votes		38,157	97.9	
Informal votes		801	2.1	
Turnout		38,958	92.0	
Labor hold		Swing	−8.9	

==== 1922 ====
1922 Australian federal election: Dalley
Party	Candidate	Votes	%	±%
Labor	William Mahony	16,104	66.7	+7.0
Nationalist	William Simpson	6,017	24.9	−15.4
Majority Labor	Herbert Mitchell	2,034	8.4	+8.4
Total formal votes		24,155	95.5	
Informal votes		1,125	4.5	
Turnout		25,280	59.6	
Two-party-preferred result
Labor	William Mahony		70.9	+11.2
Nationalist	William Simpson		29.1	−11.2
Labor hold		Swing	+11.2	

=== Elections in the 1910s ===
==== 1919 ====
1919 Australian federal election: Dalley
Party	Candidate	Votes	%	±%
Labor	William Mahony	16,242	59.7	+5.7
Nationalist	Walter Clutton	10,956	40.3	−5.7
Total formal votes		27,198	97.6	
Informal votes		657	2.4	
Turnout		27,855	69.1	
Labor hold		Swing	+5.7	

==== 1917 ====
1917 Australian federal election: Dalley
Party	Candidate	Votes	%	±%
Labor	William Mahony	15,658	54.0	−7.3
Nationalist	Albert Lane	13,352	46.0	+7.3
Total formal votes		29,010	97.2	
Informal votes		845	2.8	
Turnout		29,855	72.3	
Labor hold		Swing	−7.3	

==== 1915 ====
1915 Dalley by-election
Party	Candidate	Votes	%	±%
Labor	William Mahony	unopposed		
Labor hold		Swing		

==== 1914 ====
1914 Australian federal election: Dalley
Party	Candidate	Votes	%	±%
Labor	Robert Howe	14,963	61.3	+3.6
Liberal	John McEachern	9,450	38.7	−3.6
Total formal votes		24,413	97.7	
Informal votes		587	2.3	
Turnout		25,000	58.5	
Labor hold		Swing	+3.6	

==== 1913 ====
1913 Australian federal election: Dalley
Party	Candidate	Votes	%	±%
Labor	Robert Howe	17,520	57.7	+1.1
Liberal	Harry Scott	12,829	42.3	−1.1
Total formal votes		30,349	98.3	
Informal votes		519	1.7	
Turnout		30,868	74.0	
Labor hold		Swing	+1.1	

==== 1910 ====
1910 Australian federal election: Dalley
Party	Candidate	Votes	%	±%
Labour	Robert Howe	14,610	56.6	+9.3
Liberal	William Wilks	11,215	43.4	−9.3
Total formal votes		25,825	98.8	
Informal votes		318	1.2	
Turnout		26,143	74.9	
Labour gain from Liberal		Swing	+9.3	

=== Elections in the 1900s ===
==== 1906 ====
1906 Australian federal election: Dalley
Party	Candidate	Votes	%	±%
Anti-Socialist	William Wilks	9,863	52.7	−22.2
Labour	Robert Howe	8,850	47.3	+47.3
Total formal votes		18,713	97.5	
Informal votes		481	2.5	
Turnout		19,194	63.9	
Anti-Socialist hold		Swing	−22.2	

==== 1903 ====
1903 Australian federal election: Dalley
Party	Candidate	Votes	%	±%
Free Trade	William Wilks	12,814	74.9	+24.1
Ind. Protectionist	Selina Anderson	3,036	17.7	+17.7
Ind. Protectionist	William Burns	1,263	7.4	+7.4
Total formal votes		17,113	97.4	
Informal votes		457	2.6	
Turnout		15,570	51.1	
Free Trade hold		Swing	+17.4	

==== 1901 ====
1901 Australian federal election: Dalley
Party	Candidate	Votes	%	±%
Free Trade	William Wilks	5,507	50.8	+50.8
Protectionist	Reginald Cohen	3,081	28.4	+28.4
Labour	Sydney Law	2,245	20.7	+20.7
Total formal votes		10,833	98.8	
Informal votes		131	1.2	
Turnout		10,964	72.6	
Free Trade win		(new seat)		
