= List of elections in 1953 =

The following elections occurred in the year 1953.

== Africa ==
- 1953 Federation of Rhodesia and Nyasaland election
- 1953 South African general election
- 1953 Southern Rhodesian federation referendum
- 1953 South-West African legislative election

== Asia ==
- 1953 Iraqi parliamentary election
- 1953 Japanese general election
- 1953 Japanese House of Councillors election
- 1953 Kathmandu municipal election
- 1953 Lebanese general election
- 1953 Malayan local elections
- 1953 Philippine House of Representatives elections
- 1953 Philippine Senate election
- 1953 Philippine general election
- 1953 Philippine presidential election
- 1953 Sikkimese general election
- 1953 Syrian parliamentary election
- 1953 Syrian presidential election
- 1953 Syrian constitutional referendum

== Australia ==
- 1953 Australian Senate election
- 1953 Corangamite by-election
- 1953 Dalley by-election
- 1953 Dulwich Hill state by-election
- 1953 Gwydir by-election
- 1953 Kahibah state by-election
- 1953 Lang by-election
- 1953 New South Wales state election
- 1953 Queensland state election
- 1953 South Australian state election
- 1953 Waverley state by-election
- 1953 Western Australian state election

== Europe ==
- 1953 Bulgarian parliamentary election
- 1953 Czechoslovak presidential election
- 1953 Danish Folketing election
- 1953 Danish general election
- 1953 Danish Landsting election
- 1953 Danish constitutional and electoral age referendum
- 1953 Gibraltar general election
- 1953 Hungarian parliamentary election
- 1953 Icelandic parliamentary election
- 1953 Italian general election
- February 1953 Liechtenstein general election
- June 1953 Liechtenstein general election
- 1953 Maltese general election
- 1953 Norwegian parliamentary election
- 1953 Portuguese legislative election
- 1953 Serbian parliamentary election
- 1953 Swiss referendums
- 1953 Yugoslavian parliamentary election

=== Austria ===
- 1953 Austrian legislative election

=== France ===
- 1953 French presidential election

=== Germany ===
- 1953 West German federal election

=== United Kingdom ===
- 1953 Abingdon by-election
- 1953 Barnsley by-election
- 1953 Birmingham Edgbaston by-election
- 1953 Broxtowe by-election
- 1953 Canterbury by-election
- 1953 Crosby by-election
- 1953 Hayes and Harlington by-election
- 1953 Holborn and St Pancras South by-election
- 1953 Isle of Thanet by-election
- 1953 North Down by-election
- 1953 Ormskirk by-election
- 1953 Paddington North by-election
- 1953 Stoke-on-Trent North by-election
- 1953 Sunderland South by-election

==== United Kingdom local ====
===== English local =====
- 1953 Bermondsey Borough election
- 1953 Southwark Borough election

== Central America ==
- 1953 Costa Rican general election
- 1953 Guatemalan parliamentary election

== North America ==
=== Canada ===
- 1953 Canadian federal election
- 1953 British Columbia general election
- 1953 Edmonton municipal election
- 1953 Manitoba general election
- 1953 Nova Scotia general election
- 1953 Toronto municipal election
- 1953 Winnipeg municipal election

=== United States ===
- 1953 United States elections

==== United States lieutenant gubernatorial ====
- 1953 Virginia lieutenant gubernatorial election

==== United States gubernatorial ====
- 1953 New Jersey gubernatorial election
- 1953 United States gubernatorial elections
- 1953 Virginia gubernatorial election

==== United States House of Representatives ====
- 1953 South Carolina's 4th congressional district special election
- 1953 United States House of Representatives elections

==== United States mayoral elections ====
- 1953 Cleveland mayoral election
- 1953 Hartford, Connecticut mayoral election
- 1953 Manchester, New Hampshire mayoral election
- 1953 New York City mayoral election
- 1953 Pittsburgh mayoral election
- 1953 Springfield mayoral election

== Oceania ==
=== Australia ===
- 1953 Australian Senate election
- 1953 Corangamite by-election
- 1953 Dalley by-election
- 1953 Dulwich Hill state by-election
- 1953 Gwydir by-election
- 1953 Kahibah state by-election
- 1953 Lang by-election
- 1953 New South Wales state election
- 1953 Queensland state election
- 1953 South Australian state election
- 1953 Waverley state by-election
- 1953 Western Australian state election
