= Dalley by-election =

Dalley by-election may refer to one of three elections for the Australian House of Representatives seat of Dalley:

- 1915 Dalley by-election
- 1927 Dalley by-election
- 1953 Dalley by-election
