= Electoral results for the district of Dulwich Hill =

Election result for Dulwich Hill, New South Wales, Australia

Dulwich Hill, an electoral district of the Legislative Assembly in the Australian state of New South Wales had two incarnations, from 1913 until 1920 and from 1927 until 1968.

Election	Member	Party
1913	Tom Hoskins	Liberal Reform
1917	Tom Hoskins	Nationalist
Election	Member	Party
1927	John Ness	Nationalist
1930	Frank Connors	Labor
1932	John Ness	United Australia
1935	John Ness	United Australia
1938	Guy Arkins	United Australia
1941	George Weir	Labor
1944	George Weir	Labor
1947	George Weir	Labor
1950	George Weir	Labor
1953	George Weir	Labor
1953 by	Cliff Mallam	Labor
1956	Cliff Mallam	Labor
1959	Cliff Mallam	Labor
1962	Cliff Mallam	Labor
1965	Cliff Mallam	Labor

== Election results ==
=== Elections in the 1960s ===
==== 1965 ====
1965 New South Wales state election: Dulwich Hill
Party	Candidate	Votes	%	±%
Labor	Cliff Mallam	11,144	54.3	−3.3
Liberal	Russell Carter	9,387	45.7	+3.3
Total formal votes		20,531	98.2	−0.4
Informal votes		381	1.8	+0.4
Turnout		20,912	91.2	−1.2
Labor hold		Swing	−3.3	

==== 1962 ====
1962 New South Wales state election: Dulwich Hill
Party	Candidate	Votes	%	±%
Labor	Cliff Mallam	12,703	57.6	+5.3
Liberal	William Bellenger	9,340	42.4	−0.4
Total formal votes		22,043	98.6	
Informal votes		302	1.4	
Turnout		22,345	92.4	
Labor hold		Swing	+4.3	

=== Elections in the 1950s ===
==== 1959 ====
1959 New South Wales state election: Dulwich Hill
Party	Candidate	Votes	%	±%
Labor	Cliff Mallam	11,733	52.3	
Liberal	Joseph Hollis	9,601	42.8	
Democratic Labor	Owen Cahill	1,104	4.9	
Total formal votes		22,438	98.4	
Informal votes		372	1.6	
Turnout		22,810	93.8	
Two-party-preferred result
Labor	Cliff Mallam	11,954	53.3	
Liberal	Joseph Hollis	10,484	46.7	
Labor hold		Swing		

==== 1956 ====
1956 New South Wales state election: Dulwich Hill
Party	Candidate	Votes	%	±%
Labor	Cliff Mallam	10,507	52.7	−9.7
Liberal	Lionel Corner	9,436	47.3	+9.7
Total formal votes		19,943	98.4	+0.5
Informal votes		326	1.6	−0.5
Turnout		20,269	92.3	−1.3
Labor hold		Swing	−9.7	

==== 1953 by-election ====
1953 Dulwich Hill by-election Saturday 20 June
Party	Candidate	Votes	%	±%
Labor	Cliff Mallam	10,886	53.01	−9.43
Liberal	William Ness	9,182	44.71	+7.15
Independent	John Sheehan	468	2.28	
Total formal votes		20,536	98.50	+0.57
Informal votes		312	1.50	−0.57
Turnout		20,848	86.69	−6.88
Labor hold		Swing	N/A	

George Weir (Labor) resigned to accept an appointment as a judge of the New South Wales Industrial Commission.

==== 1953 ====
1953 New South Wales state election: Dulwich Hill
Party	Candidate	Votes	%	±%
Labor	George Weir	13,626	62.4	
Liberal	Basil Mottershead	8,196	37.6	
Total formal votes		21,822	97.9	
Informal votes		461	2.1	
Turnout		22,283	93.6	
Labor hold		Swing		

==== 1950 ====
1950 New South Wales state election: Dulwich Hill
Party	Candidate	Votes	%	±%
Labor	George Weir	12,732	54.3	
Liberal	Leslie Parr	10,732	45.7	
Total formal votes		23,464	98.7	
Informal votes		300	1.3	
Turnout		23,764	91.9	
Labor hold		Swing		

=== Elections in the 1940s ===
==== 1947 ====
1947 New South Wales state election: Dulwich Hill
Party	Candidate	Votes	%	±%
Labor	George Weir	11,931	54.1	+9.8
Liberal	John Adamson	10,105	45.9	+14.8
Total formal votes		22,036	98.7	+1.7
Informal votes		300	1.3	−1.7
Turnout		22,336	94.9	+2.1
Labor hold		Swing	−2.3	

==== 1944 ====
1944 New South Wales state election: Dulwich Hill
Party	Candidate	Votes	%	±%
Labor	George Weir	8,959	44.3	−12.6
Democratic	Sidney Turner	6,297	31.1	−12.0
Lang Labor	Henry Ritchie	3,181	15.7	+15.7
Independent	John Laxton	1,798	8.9	+8.9
Total formal votes		20,235	97.0	−1.2
Informal votes		625	3.0	+1.2
Turnout		20,860	92.8	−0.7
Two-party-preferred result
Labor	George Weir	11,408	56.4	−0.5
Democratic	Sidney Turner	8,827	43.6	+0.5
Labor hold		Swing	−0.5	

==== 1941 ====
1941 New South Wales state election: Dulwich Hill
Party	Candidate	Votes	%	±%
Labor	George Weir	11,370	56.9	
United Australia	Guy Arkins	8,604	43.1	
Total formal votes		19,974	98.2	
Informal votes		363	1.8	
Turnout		20,337	93.5	
Labor gain from United Australia		Swing		

=== Elections in the 1930s ===
==== 1938 ====
1938 New South Wales state election: Dulwich Hill
Party	Candidate	Votes	%	±%
United Australia	Guy Arkins	7,364	36.7	−25.2
Labor	Leslie Morrow	6,992	34.9	−3.2
United Australia	Ronald McCredie	5,686	28.4	+28.4
Total formal votes		20,042	98.4	+0.2
Informal votes		326	1.6	−0.2
Turnout		20,368	96.5	−0.2
Two-party-preferred result
United Australia	Guy Arkins	12,497	62.3	+0.4
Labor	Leslie Morrow	7,545	37.7	−0.4
United Australia hold		Swing	+0.4	

==== 1935 ====
1935 New South Wales state election: Dulwich Hill
Party	Candidate	Votes	%	±%
United Australia	John Ness	12,074	61.9	+16.8
Labor (NSW)	Frank Connors	7,429	38.1	+6.2
Total formal votes		19,503	98.2	−0.7
Informal votes		359	1.8	+0.7
Turnout		19,862	96.7	+0.5
United Australia hold		Swing	+0.4	

==== 1932 ====
1932 New South Wales state election: Dulwich Hill
Party	Candidate	Votes	%	±%
United Australia	John Ness	8,679	45.1	−3.1
Labor (NSW)	Frank Connors	6,151	31.9	−19.5
Ind. United Australia	Francis Pascoe	2,679	13.9	+13.9
Federal Labor	William Long	1,746	9.1	+9.1
Total formal votes		19,255	98.9	+0.7
Informal votes		206	1.1	−0.7
Turnout		19,461	96.2	+2.2
Two-party-preferred result
United Australia	John Ness	11,840	61.5	+13.2
Labor (NSW)	Frank Connors	7,415	38.5	−13.2
United Australia gain from Labor (NSW)		Swing	+13.2	

==== 1930 ====
1930 New South Wales state election: Dulwich Hill
Party	Candidate	Votes	%	±%
Labor	Frank Connors	9,558	51.4	
Nationalist	John Ness (defeated)	8,970	48.2	
Communist	Edna Kavanagh	75	0.4	
Total formal votes		18,603	98.2	
Informal votes		338	1.8	
Turnout		18,941	94.0	
Labor gain from Nationalist		Swing		

=== Elections in the 1920s ===
==== 1927 ====
1927 New South Wales state election: Dulwich Hill
Party	Candidate	Votes	%	±%
Nationalist	John Ness	6,584	44.3	
Labor	Thomas Gilson	5,258	35.4	
Ind. Nationalist	Tom Hoskins (defeated)	2,887	19.4	
Independent	Donald Croal	131	0.9	
Total formal votes		14,860	97.8	
Informal votes		331	2.2	
Turnout		15,191	87.0	
Two-party-preferred result
Nationalist	John Ness	8,427	59.8	
Labor	Thomas Gilson	5,662	40.2	
Nationalist win		(new seat)		

=== Elections in the 1910s ===
==== 1917 ====
1917 New South Wales state election: Dulwich Hill
Party	Candidate	Votes	%	±%
Nationalist	Tom Hoskins	6,098	68.8	+9.3
Labor	Joseph Cahill	2,765	31.2	−7.4
Total formal votes		8,863	99.5	+1.5
Informal votes		43	0.5	−1.5
Turnout		8,906	61.6	−10.0
Nationalist hold		Swing	+9.3	

==== 1913 ====
1913 New South Wales state election: Dulwich Hill
Party	Candidate	Votes	%	±%
Liberal Reform	Tom Hoskins	5,316	59.5	
Labor	Arthur Jones	3,454	38.6	
Independent	Harrie McConnell	107	1.2	
National Progressive	Evan Prosser	61	0.7	
Total formal votes		8,938	98.0	
Informal votes		181	2.0	
Turnout		9,119	71.6	
Liberal Reform win		(new seat)		
