= 1957 Burwood state by-election =

Election result for Burwood, New South Wales, Australia

A by-election was held for the New South Wales Legislative Assembly electorate of Burwood on 16 February 1957 because of the death of Leslie Parr (Liberal).

== Dates ==
Date	Event
3 December 1956	Leslie Parr died.
17 January 1957	Writ of election issued by the Speaker of the Legislative Assembly.
23 January 1957	Nominations
16 February 1957	Polling day
15 March 1957	Return of writ

== Result ==
1957 Burwood by-election Saturday 16 February
Party	Candidate	Votes	%	±%
Liberal	Ben Doig	8,414	45.8	
Democratic Labor	Maurice Colreavy	3,815	20.8	
Independent Liberal	Henry Seldon	2,951	16.1	
Independent Labor	John Cunningham	2,748	15.0	
Independent	Edward Spensley	431	2.4	
Total formal votes		18,359	97.3	
Informal votes		514	2.7	
Turnout		18,873	84.9	
Liberal hold		Swing	N/A	

== See also ==
- Electoral results for the district of Burwood (New South Wales)
- List of New South Wales state by-elections
