= John Jackett =

John Jackett may refer to:

- John Jackett (politician) (1912–2003), member of the New South Wales Legislative Assembly
- John Jackett (rugby union) (1878–1935), English rugby union and rugby league player
