= 1951 Burwood state by-election =

Election result for Burwood, New South Wales, Australia

A by-election was held for the New South Wales Legislative Assembly electorate of Burwood on 2 June 1951 because of the death of Gordon Jackett (Liberal).

== Dates ==
Date	Event
3 May 1951	Gordon Jackett died.
7 May 1951	Writ of election issued by the Speaker of the Legislative Assembly.
15 May 1951	Nominations
2 June 1951	Polling day
29 June 1951	Return of writ

== Result ==
1951 Burwood by-election Saturday 2 June
Party	Candidate	Votes	%	±%
Liberal	Leslie Parr	11,045	52.6	−5.4
Labor	Cliff Mallam	7,783	37.1	
Independent	Rex Reynolds	2,168	10.3	
Total formal votes		20,996	99.0	+3.9
Informal votes		210	1.0	−3.9
Turnout		21,206	85.9	−6.5
Liberal hold		Swing	N/A	

== See also ==
- Electoral results for the district of Burwood (New South Wales)
- List of New South Wales state by-elections
