= Cliff Mallam =

Australian politician

Personal details
- Born: 4 December 1909 near Glen Innes, New South Wales
- Died: 18 February 2006 (aged 96) Camden, New South Wales
- Party: Labor Party

Heathcote Clifford Mallam (4 December 1909 – 18 February 2006) was an Australian politician and a member of the New South Wales Legislative Assembly between 1953 and 1968 and between 1971 and 1981. He was a member of the Labor Party (ALP).

== Early life ==
Mallam was born at Backwater near Glen Innes, New South Wales and was the son of a farmer. He was educated to elementary level at numerous state schools in the North Coast region of New South Wales. At the age of 12 he left school and worked on dairy farms, he was also employed as a shearer, drover, storekeeper and bus driver. He eventually became a taxi and bus service owner in Hurstville and Earlwood and ran a ferry service on Port Hacking. He was a long-term member of the Transport Workers Union and joined the Labor Party in 1926. Between 1946 and 1976 he was an editorial assistant on Jack Lang's paper, The Century.

== State politics ==
Mallam was the unsuccessful Labor candidate for the seat of Burwood at the 1944 state election, and the 1951 Burwood by-election caused by the death of the sitting Liberal member Gordon Jackett. He was eventually elected to parliament as the member for Dulwich Hill at the 1953 Dulwich Hill by-election caused by the resignation of the sitting Labor member George Weir who had accepted a position as a judge on the Industrial Relations Commission of New South Wales. Mallam retained the seat at the next 4 elections, until it was abolished by a redistribution at the 1968 election. He did not contest that election but won Labor endorsement for the new seat of Cook at the 1969 federal election. He was defeated by the Liberal's Don Dobie. In 1971, Mallam was selected by the Labor Party for the seat of Campbelltown which was physically and demographically far removed from his previous seat. At the election he defeated the sitting Liberal member Max Dunbier. He retained the seat at the next 3 elections and retired from public life at the election in 1981. Mallam did not hold party, parliamentary or ministerial office but had a reputation for being a very hard working local member. He was a member of all Parents and Citizens Associations in his electorate and worked to establish TAFE colleges in south-west Sydney. He died at age 96.

New South Wales Legislative Assembly
| Preceded by George Weir | Member for Dulwich Hill; 1953–1968 | Succeeded by seat abolished |
| Preceded by Max Dunbier | Member for Campbelltown; 1971–1981 | Succeeded by Michael Knight |
