= Division of Dalley =

Former Australian federal electoral division

Dalley Australian House of Representatives Division
- Created: 1901
- Abolished: 1969
- Namesake: William Dalley

The Division of Dalley was an Australian Electoral Division in New South Wales. The division was created in 1900 and was one of the original 75 divisions contested at the first federal election. It was named for the colonial politician William Dalley and was located in the inner suburbs of Sydney, including Balmain, Glebe and Leichhardt. It was abolished in 1969.

For most of its history it was a safe seat for the Australian Labor Party, which held it without interruption from 1910 onward. In the 1930s it was a stronghold of the radical Premier of New South Wales, Jack Lang. Its most prominent member was Ted Theodore, who was deputy Labor leader and Treasurer in the Scullin government, having previously served as Premier of Queensland from 1919 to 1925. William Mahony's 1927 resignation triggered a by-election, which was won by Theodore who was awarded pre-selection without a ballot. Theodore was defeated in 1931 by the Lang follower and later Deputy Leader of Australian Labor Party (Non-Communist) Sol Rosevear, who was Speaker during the Curtin and Chifley governments.

== Members ==
Image	Member	Party	Term	Notes
	Bill Wilks (1863–1940)	Free Trade	29 March 1901 – 1906	Previously held the New South Wales Legislative Assembly seat of Balmain North. Served as Chief Government Whip in the House under Reid. Lost seat
	Bill Wilks (1863–1940)	Anti-Socialist	1906 – 26 May 1909	Previously held the New South Wales Legislative Assembly seat of Balmain North. Served as Chief Government Whip in the House under Reid. Lost seat
	Bill Wilks (1863–1940)	Liberal	26 May 1909 – 13 April 1910	Previously held the New South Wales Legislative Assembly seat of Balmain North. Served as Chief Government Whip in the House under Reid. Lost seat
	Robert Howe (1861–1915)	Labor	13 April 1910 – 2 April 1915	Died in office
	William Mahony (1877–1962)	Labor	6 May 1915 – 18 January 1927	Resigned to retire from politics
	Ted Theodore (1884–1950)	Labor	26 February 1927 – 19 December 1931	Previously held the Legislative Assembly of Queensland seat of Woothakata. Served as minister under Scullin. Lost seat
	Sol Rosevear (1892–1953)	Labor (NSW)	19 December 1931 – February 1936	Served as Speaker during the Curtin, Forde and Chifley Governments. Died in office
	Sol Rosevear (1892–1953)	Labor	February 1936 – 2 May 1940	Served as Speaker during the Curtin, Forde and Chifley Governments. Died in office
	Sol Rosevear (1892–1953)	Labor (Non-Communist)	2 May 1940 – February 1941	Served as Speaker during the Curtin, Forde and Chifley Governments. Died in office
	Sol Rosevear (1892–1953)	Labor	February 1941 – 21 March 1953	Served as Speaker during the Curtin, Forde and Chifley Governments. Died in office
	Arthur Greenup (1902-1980)	Labor	9 May 1953 – 4 November 1955	Previously held the New South Wales Legislative Assembly seat of Newtown-Annandale. Lost preselection and retired
	William O'Connor (1910–1987)	Labor	10 December 1955 – 29 September 1969	Previously held the Division of Martin. Retired after Dalley was abolished in 1969
