= 1953 Dulwich Hill state by-election =

Election result for Dulwich Hill, New South Wales, Australia

A by-election was held for the New South Wales Legislative Assembly seat of Dulwich Hill on 20 June 1953 because of the resignation of George Weir (Labor) to accept an appointment as a judge of the New South Wales Industrial Commission.

== Candidates ==
- Cliff Mallam (Labor) ran a ferry service on Port Hacking.
- William Ness (Liberal) was an estate agent and the son of former member John Ness (United Australia).
- John Sheehan was a grocer from Punchbowl. Antony Green lists him as an independent, however The Sydney Morning Herald listed him as a communist.

== Result ==
1953 Dulwich Hill by-election]] Saturday 20 June
Party	Candidate	Votes	%	±%
Labor	Cliff Mallam	10,886	53.01	−9.43
Liberal	William Ness	9,182	44.71	+7.15
Independent	John Sheehan	468	2.28	
Total formal votes		20,536	98.50	+0.57
Informal votes		312	1.50	−0.57
Turnout		20,848	86.69	−6.88
Labor hold		Swing	N/A	

== See also ==
- Electoral results for the district of Dulwich Hill
- List of New South Wales state by-elections
