= 1927 Dalley by-election =

| 26 February 1927 |
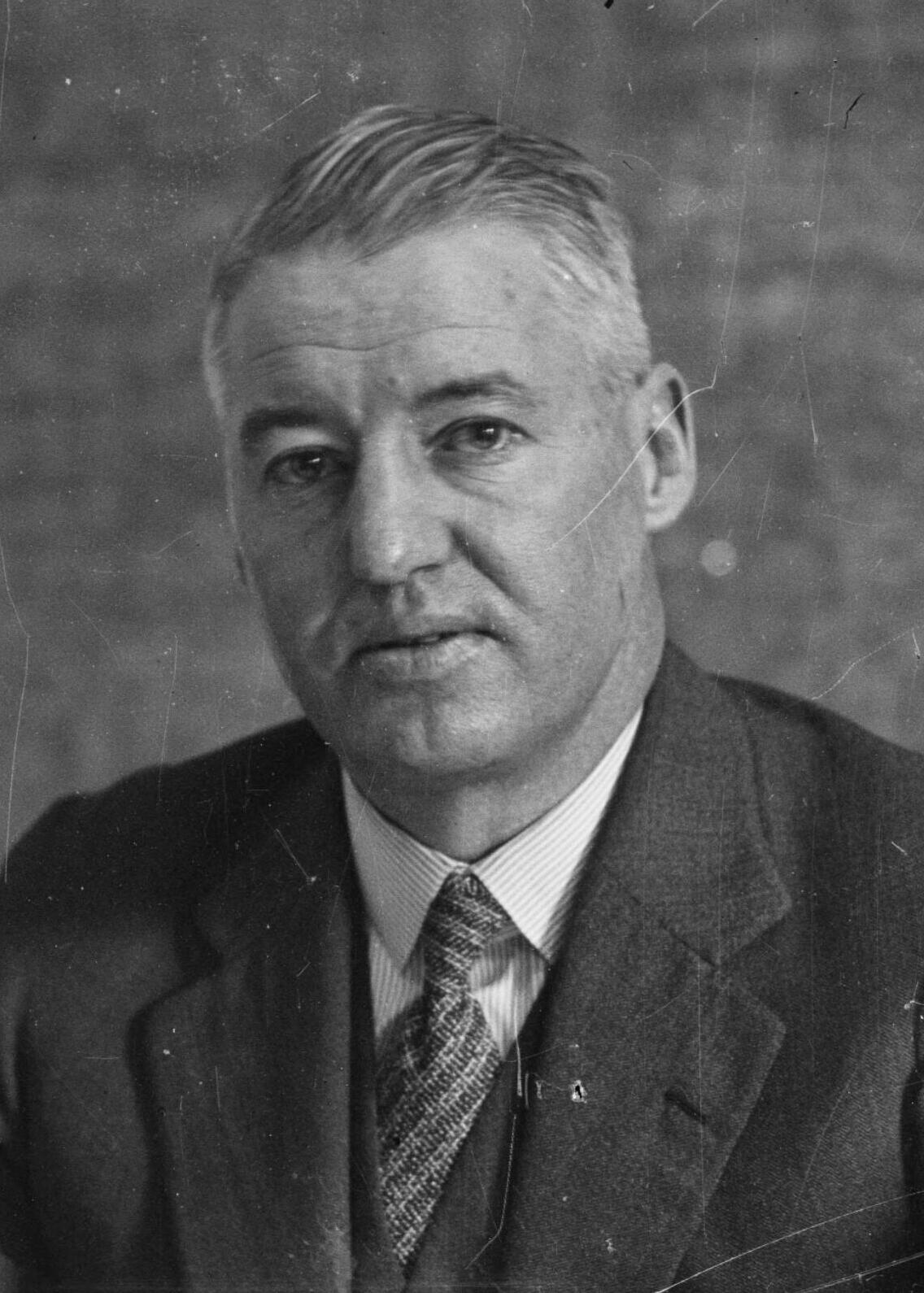
| | First party | Second party |
|---|---|---|
| | | NAT |
| Candidate | Ted Theodore | Walter Gee |
| Party | Labor | Nationalist |
| Popular vote | 21,186 | 12,667 |
| Percentage | 62.6% | 37.4% |
| Swing | ▼1.5pp | ▲1.5pp |
MP before election
William Mahony
Labor
Elected MP
Ted Theodore
Labor

A by-election was held for the Australian House of Representatives seat of Dalley on 26 February 1927. This was triggered by the resignation of Labor MP William Mahony.

The by-election was won by former Queensland Premier Ted Theodore, the Labor candidate. After the by-election there was some suggestion that Theodore had bribed Mahony to resign so that he might enter Parliament.

== Results ==
1927 Dalley by-election
| Party | Candidate | Votes | % | ±% |
|---|---|---|---|---|
| Labor | Ted Theodore | 21,186 | 62.6 | −1.5 |
| Nationalist | Walter Gee | 12,667 | 37.4 | +1.5 |
| Total formal votes | | 33,853 | 93.1 | |
| Informal votes | | 2,517 | 6.9 | |
| Turnout | | 36,370 | 89.3 | |
| Labor hold | | Swing | −1.5 | |

== See also ==
- Electoral results for the Division of Dalley
- List of Australian federal by-elections
