= 1915 Dalley by-election =

A by-election for the Australian House of Representatives seat of Dalley was triggered by the death, on 2 April 1915, of Labor MP Robert Howe. However, by the close of nominations on 6 May only one candidate, Labor's William Mahony, had nominated, and he was thus declared elected unopposed.

== Results ==
1915 Dalley by-election
Party	Candidate	Votes	%	±%
Labor	William Mahony	unopposed		
Labor hold		Swing		

== See also ==
- Electoral results for the Division of Dalley
- List of Australian federal by-elections
