= 1953 Virginia lieutenant gubernatorial election =

- November 3, 1953
Nominee	Allie Edward Stakes Stephens	Stephen D. Timberlake
Party	Democratic	Republican
Popular vote	228,005	167,336
Percentage	57.67%	42.33%
- County and independent city results Stephens: 50–60% 60–70% 70–80% 80–90% Timberlake: 50–60% 60–70% No Data/Vote
Lieutenant Governor before election
Allie Edward Stakes Stephens
Democratic
Elected Lieutenant Governor
Allie Edward Stakes Stephens
Democratic

The 1953 Virginia lieutenant gubernatorial election was held on November 3, 1953, in order to elect the lieutenant governor of Virginia. Democratic nominee and incumbent lieutenant governor Allie Edward Stakes Stephens defeated Republican nominee Stephen D. Timberlake.

== General election ==
On election day, November 3, 1953, Democratic nominee Allie Edward Stakes Stephens won re-election by a margin of 60,669 votes against his opponent Republican nominee Stephen D. Timberlake, thereby retaining Democratic control over the office of lieutenant governor. Stephens was sworn in for his first full term on January 20, 1954.

=== Results ===
Virginia lieutenant gubernatorial election, 1953
Party	Candidate	Votes	%
Democratic	Allie Edward Stakes Stephens (incumbent)	228,005	57.67
Republican	Stephen D. Timberlake	167,336	42.33
Total votes		395,341	100.00
Democratic hold			
