= William O'Connor (Australian politician) =

Australian politician

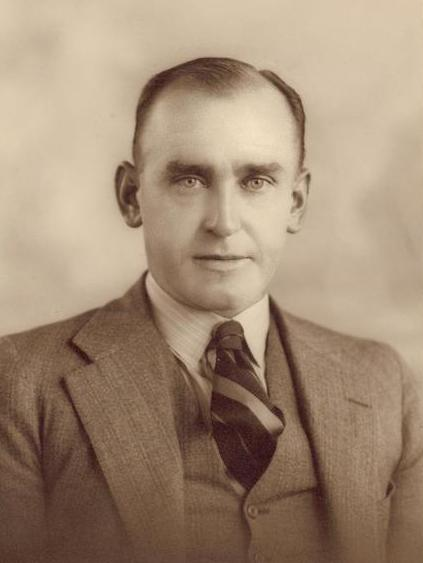

Member of the Australian Parliament for West Sydney
- In office 28 September 1946 – 10 December 1949
- Preceded by: Jack Beasley
- Succeeded by: Dan Minogue

Member of the Australian Parliament for Martin
- In office 10 December 1949 – 10 December 1955
- Preceded by: Fred Daly
- Succeeded by: Seat abolished

Member of the Australian Parliament for Dalley
- In office 10 December 1955 – 29 September 1969
- Preceded by: Arthur Greenup
- Succeeded by: Seat abolished

Personal details
- Born: 29 September 1910
- Died: 18 September 1987 (aged 76)
- Party: Australian Labor Party
- Occupation: Clerk

William Paul O'Connor (29 September 1910 – 18 September 1987) was an Australian politician. He was educated at Catholic schools before becoming a clerk, as well as an organiser of the Australian Workers' Union.

In 1946, he was elected to the Australian House of Representatives as the Labor member for West Sydney. Following that election, one of the defeated candidates for the seat, Ronald Sarina, petitioned the High Court to declare O'Connor's election void, claiming that O'Connor's adherence to the Catholic faith represented allegiance to a foreign power, which would make him ineligible to be a member of parliament under Section 44 of the Constitution of Australia. Sarina's solicitor sought leave to withdraw the petition, which was granted.

Following the redistribution of 1949, O'Connor transferred to Martin, which he held until 1955. In that year, Martin was abolished, and O'Connor defeated sitting Labor MP Arthur Greenup for preselection for the seat of Dalley. O'Connor held Dalley until its abolition in 1969, at which time he retired.

He died in 1987, at age 76.

Parliament of Australia
Preceded by Jack Beasley	Member for West Sydney; 1946–1949	Succeeded by Dan Minogue
Preceded by Fred Daly	Member for Martin; 1949–1955	Succeeded by Seat abolished
Preceded by Arthur Greenup	Member for Dalley; 1955–1969	Succeeded by Seat abolished
