= 1953 Serbian parliamentary election =

Parliamentary elections were held in the People's Republic of Serbia on 22 November 1953, alongside federal elections.

== Background ==
Prior to the elections, the National Assembly was made bicameral with the creation of a Council of the Republic (174 members) and Council of Producers (117 members).

The elections were the first held with ballot papers. Previously balls had been used.

== Results ==
Of the 4,493,644 registered voters, 3,847,948 (86%) voted in the elections for the Council of the Republic.
