= 1953 Cleveland mayoral election =

Cleveland mayoral election, 1953
- November 3, 1953
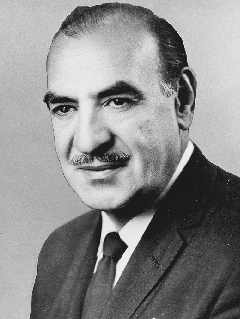

Nominee	Anthony J. Celebrezze	William J. McDermott
Party	Democratic	Republican
Popular vote	140,917	94,261
Percentage	59.92%	40.08%
Mayor before election
Thomas A. Burke
Democratic
Elected mayor
Anthony J. Celebrezze
Democratic

The Cleveland mayoral election of 1953 saw the election of Anthony J. Celebrezze.

== General election ==
1953 Cleveland mayoral election (general election)
Party	Candidate	Votes	%
Democratic	Anthony J. Celebrezze	140,917	59.92%
Republican	William J. McDermott	94,261	40.08%
Turnout		235,178	
