= Ben Doig =

Australian politician

Benjamin Cochrane Doig (17 May 1904 – 16 November 1980) was an Australian politician. He was a member of the New South Wales Legislative Assembly from 1957 to 1965, representing the electorate of Burwood. He was a member of the Liberal Party prior to 1964, but resigned to sit as an independent for his final year in parliament after losing preselection to recontest his seat.

Doig was born in Paddington, and was educated at Paddington Public School and Fort Street Boys High School before studying psychology at the University of Sydney. He worked as an industrial psychologist for Bonds Limited from 1926 to 1927 and as manager for an advertising agency from 1928 to 1932. From 1932 onwards, he worked as an insurance executive for the Mutual Life and Citizens Assurance Company.

Doig was a Liberal candidate for safe Labor seat of Waverley at the 1953, and 1953 by-election. He was elected to the Legislative Assembly for the safe Liberal seat of Burwood at the 1957 by-election following the death of incumbent MP Leslie Parr. He was re-elected at the in 1959, and 1962 elections. Doig had narrowly survived a preselection ballot in 1961 but was again challenged for preselection for the 1965 election by opponents of his stance on state aid to church schools. Doig had been among the most ardent supporters of the policy in the Liberal Party, and was defeated by challenger John Jackett. Doig resigned from the Liberal Party after his loss, and contested the 1965 election as an independent, but was defeated by Jackett. He subsequently returned to his prior role as an insurance executive. He stood as an independent candidate for Burwood at the 1968, and 1971 elections, but was unsuccessful.

Doig died in November 1980 at Strathfield 16 November 1980 (aged 76).

New South Wales Legislative Assembly
Preceded by Leslie Parr	Member for Burwood; 1957–1965	Succeeded by John Jackett
