= William McMillan (Australian politician) =

Australian businessman and politician (1850–1926)

The Honourable Sir William McMillan KCMG
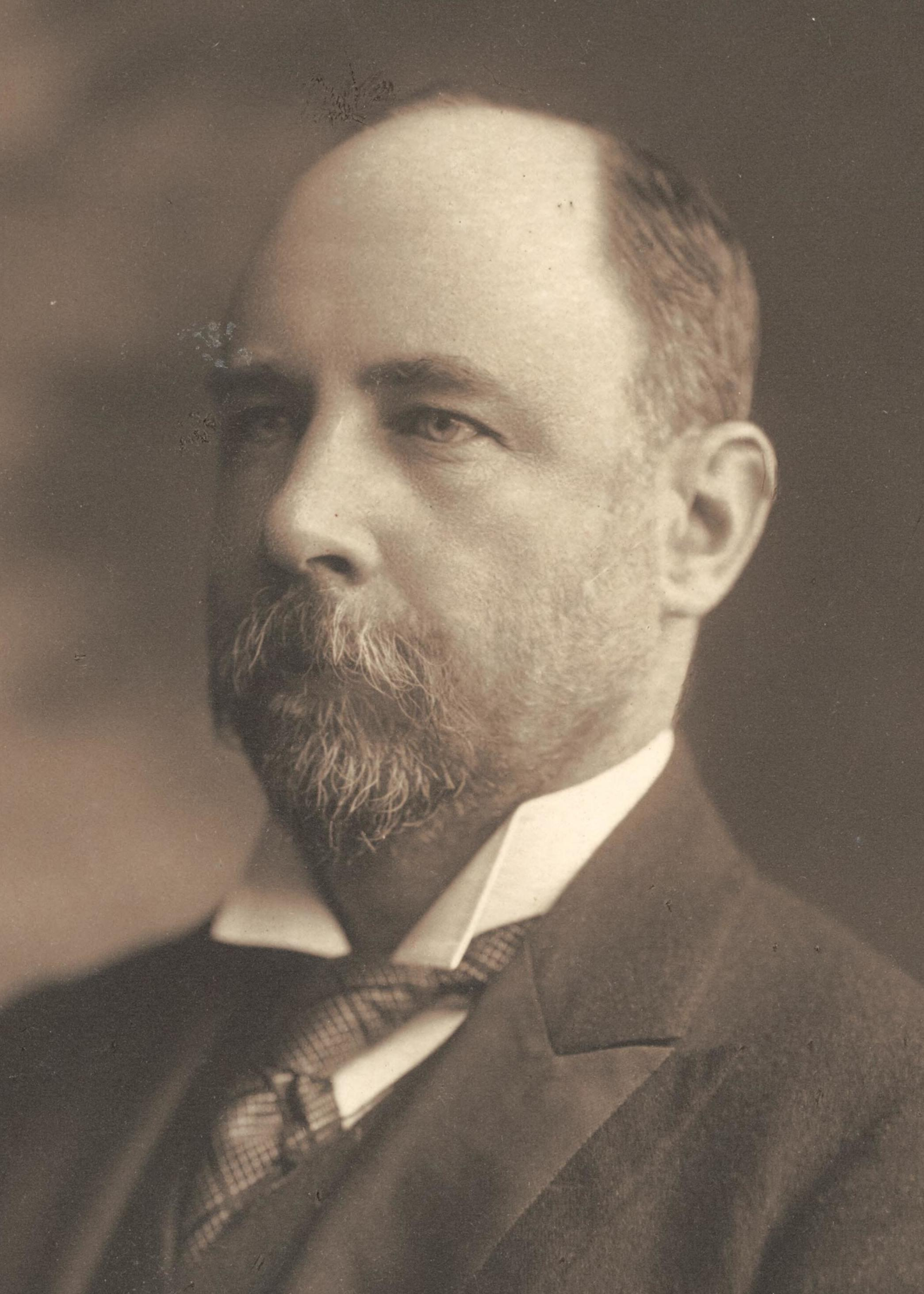

Member of the Australian Parliament for Wentworth
- In office 29 March 1901 – 23 November 1903
- Preceded by: New seat
- Succeeded by: Willie Kelly

Personal details
- Born: 14 November 1850 Derry, Ireland
- Died: 21 December 1926 (aged 76) Bellevue Hill, New South Wales
- Party: Free Trade Party
- Spouse(s): 1) Ada Charlotte Graham (divorced 1891); 2) Helen Maria O'Reilly
- Occupation: Businessman

Sir William McMillan KCMG (14 November 1850 – 21 December 1926) was an Australian businessman and politician. He was a member of the first federal parliament and served as deputy leader of the Free Trade Party under George Reid, but served only a single term before resigning. He had earlier served in the Parliament of New South Wales, including as Colonial Treasurer, and was prominent in the movement for Federation. He was born in Ireland and became a successful businessman in Australia after moving to Sydney at the age of 18.

== Early life ==
McMillan was born in Derry, Ireland, he was the fourth child and third son of Rev. Gibson McMillan, a Methodist minister. William lived in Westport and Ballina, both in County Mayo, Ireland until the age of six. In 1856, his father was assigned to the Methodist church in Abbey Street, Dublin, and McMillan began his formal education. Along with his older brothers, John and Charles, he attended boarding school at Wesley College in St. Stephens Green. The following year, the family moved to Dún Laoghaire where his father was assigned to the Adelaide Road Methodist church, and McMillan continued attending Wesley. Due to family financial difficulties at the time, McMillan had to abandon any intention to attend university in Dublin; rather, in 1864 he began studies at Tulse Hill School in London. He left Tulse Hill in 1866 and entered the employment of his uncle, Alexander McArthur.

== Commercial activities ==
He travelled to Sydney in 1869 to develop a branch of W. & A. McArthur, Ltd., wholesale merchants and importers of York Street, Sydney. He worked at the company's Melbourne branch before returning to Sydney as resident partner in 1876. He later became chairman and managing director of Metropolitan Coal Company Limited and a director the Australian branches of Westinghouse Air Brake Company Limited and Phoenix Assurance Company Limited. He was the president of Sydney Chamber of Commerce in 1886.

== New South Wales politics ==
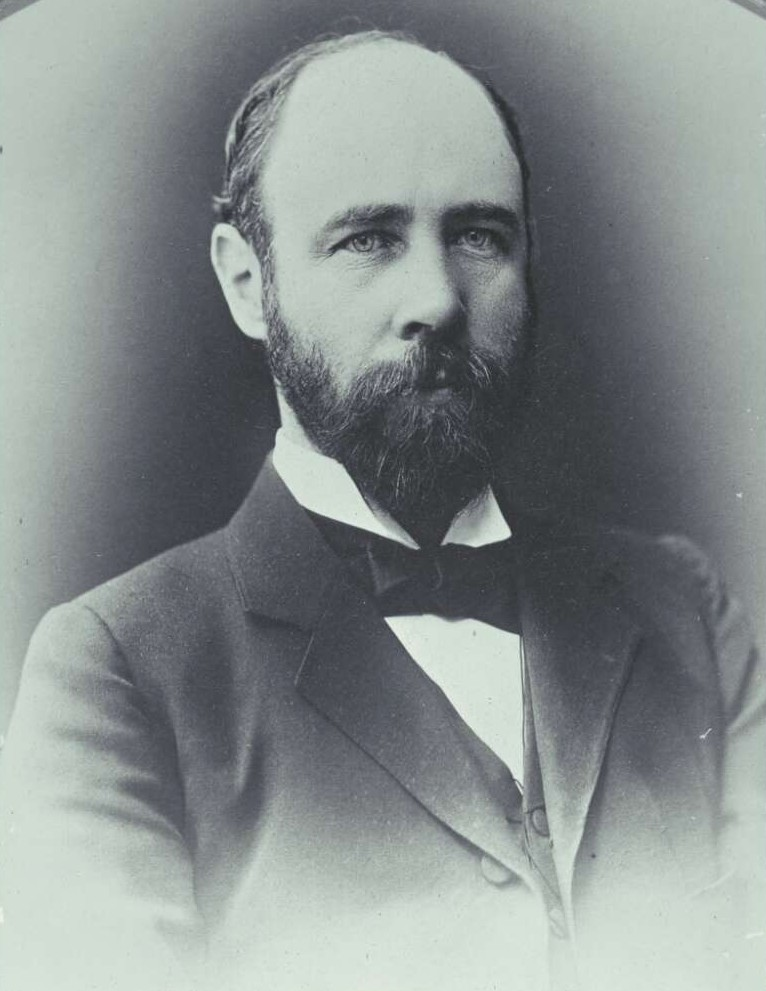
McMillan at the 1898 Australasian Federal Convention

In 1887, McMillan was elected as the member for East Sydney in the New South Wales Legislative Assembly for the Free Trade and Liberal Association, which he had helped found, and held it until shifting in 1894 to the seat of Burwood. He was Colonial Treasurer from March 1889 to July 1891 in Sir Henry Parkes fifth free trade Government. An ardent Federationist, he was a delegate to the 1890 conference on the federation of Australia and the 1891 National Australasian Convention. In March 1897 he was elected to the Australasian Federal Convention, and chaired its finance committee. However, in a shock result for Federationists, he lost his seat of Burwood in the NSW 1898 general elections. A prolonged absence overseas at this time doubtless caused discontent. More speculatively, the intensification of political competition in amid the controversy over Federation may have brought out his lack of political skills. It was at this time that the governor of the New South Wales, the 7th Earl of Beauchamp, privately judged McMillan to be "dull, prosy, preachy and much too long".

== Federal politics ==
In 1901, he was elected to federal parliament as the first member for the seat of Wentworth, and became deputy leader of the Free Trade and Liberal party under George Reid. In August 1903, McMillan acted as Leader of Opposition in the interregnum between Reid's contrived resignation from parliament and his subsequent (and inevitable) re-election at the 1903 East Sydney by-election. He retired at the 1903 election to look after his business interests. Upon hearing of McMillan's retirement, Reid stated "I hope whatever the circumstances may be that have led him to come to the determination, that they will be only of a temporary nature, and that the public will not permanently lose the benefit of his great abilities and capacity for public affairs". His political opponent Alfred Deakin recalled him as a "thoughtful, educated businessman, narrow and cold after the manner of the Manchester School … business-like in manner and incisive in debate".

McMillan stood unsuccessfully for the state seat of Willoughby in 1913.

All in all, McMillan's political career must be deemed a distinct failure in spite of its early promise.

== Personal life ==
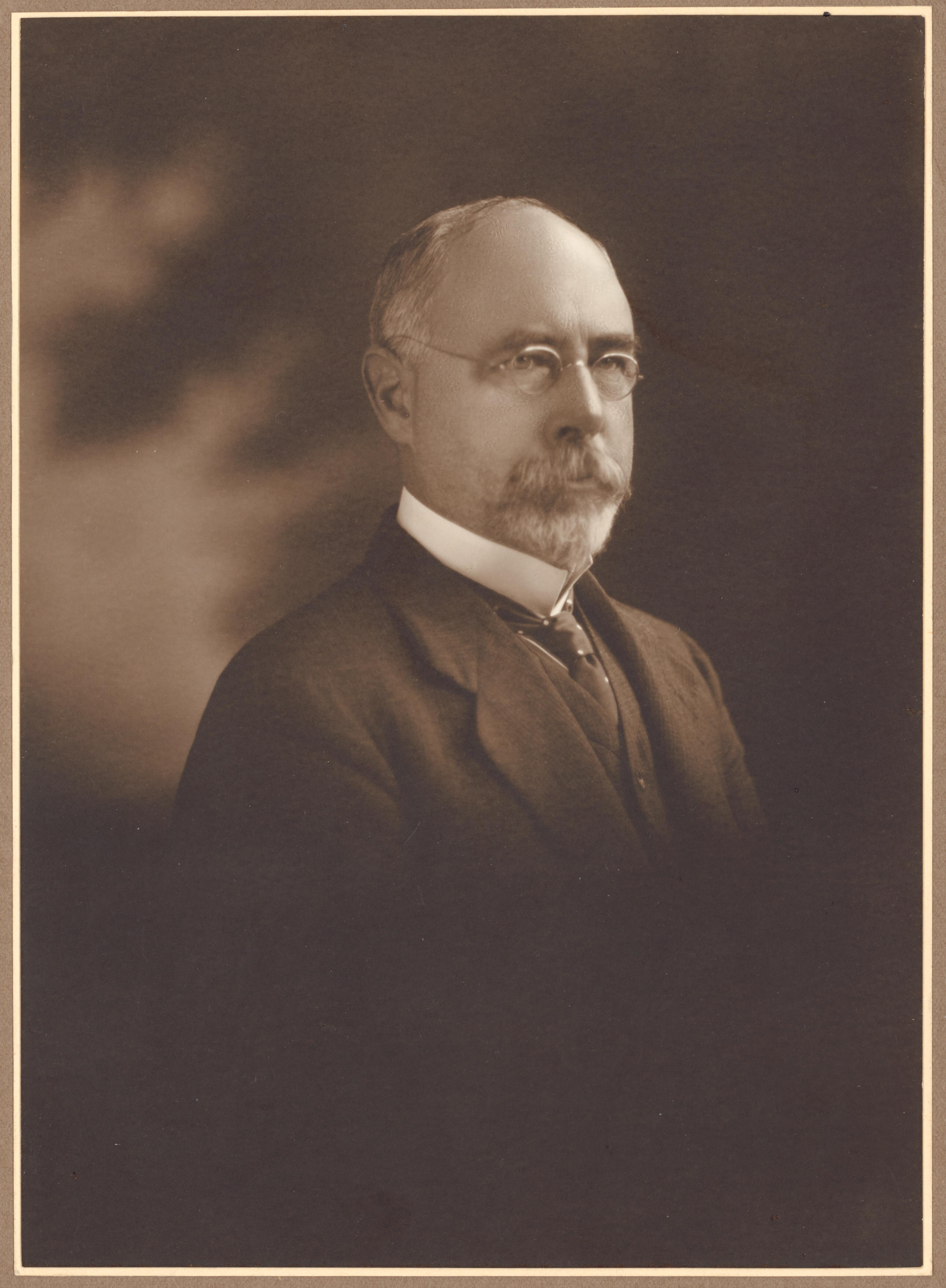
McMillan later in life

In 1878 McMillan married Ada Charlotte Graham, aged 16, and they had two daughters and two sons.

McMillan was divorced in 1891. He married Helen Maria O'Reilly (died 1937) in 1892 and they had two daughters. He died in 1926 at his house Althorne in the Sydney suburb of Bellevue Hill. His children included:

- Sister Elizabeth McMillan, founder of Tresillian Training Centre in Petersham was an authority on child welfare. She married Lieut. Dudley Percy Davidson, R.N. on 9 November 1929.
- Constance McMillan married Ernest Owen, son of Colonel Percy Owen, on 20 September 1910.
- Helen Rosamond "Bobbie" McMillan was an actress with the Emélie Polini troupe. She married Frank Harvey on 3 April 1924.
- Jocelyn McMillan married H. P. Gunnar on 24 March 1921. Gunnar was associated with the Medical School, Northwestern University, Chicago. Their son Rolf McMillan Gunnar (1926–2017) was a noted cardiologist.

== Honours ==
In the New Year Honours list on 1 January 1901, McMillan was created Knight Commander of the Order of St Michael and St George, "in recognition of services in connection with the Federation of Australian Colonies and the establishment of the Commonwealth of Australia".

== Notes ==
New South Wales Legislative Assembly
Preceded by Edmund Barton	Member for East Sydney; 1887–1894; Served alongside: Burdekin/Barton, Reid, Street/Bradley/Parkes	Seat abolished
New seat	Member for Burwood; 1894–1898	Succeeded by William Archer
Parliament of Australia
New seat	Member for Wentworth; 1901–1903	Succeeded by Willie Kelly
Party political offices
New post	Deputy Leader of the Free Trade Party; 1901–1903	Succeeded by Dugald Thomson
