= William Archer (New South Wales politician) =

Australian politician

William Archer (10 February 1831 – 6 July 1925) was an English-born Australian politician.

He was born in London to John and Eliza Archer, and was a pageboy at Kensington Palace before joining the navy. He arrived in Sydney in 1857 and went to the gold rush at Rockhampton. He then returned to New South Wales and became a horse trader at Clarendon, then joining an ironmongers' company in the 1860s and finally becoming a railway contractor. From 1874 to 1920 he served on Burwood Council with two periods as mayor (1879–82, 1912–13). During the 1890 maritime strike he contracted to the government from the Mount Kembla coal mine. Archer was a member of the New South Wales Legislative Assembly from 1898 to 1904, representing Burwood; he was generally an independent member, although he had some dealings with both the Free Trade and Progressive parties. He died at Burwood in 1925.

New South Wales Legislative Assembly
Preceded by William McMillan	Member for Burwood; 1898–1904	Succeeded by Thomas Henley
