= 1953 Dalley by-election =

A by-election was held for the Australian House of Representatives seat of Dalley on 9 May 1953. This was triggered by the death of Labor MP and former Speaker Sol Rosevear.

The by-election was won by Labor candidate Arthur Greenup.

== Results ==
1953 Dalley by-election
Party	Candidate	Votes	%	±%
Labor	Arthur Greenup	23,812	70.5	+3.4
Independent	William Cole	8,285	24.5	+24.5
Independent	John Sheean	1,667	4.9	+4.9
Total formal votes		33,764	95.4	
Informal votes		1,618	4.6	
Turnout		35,382	93.8	
Two-party-preferred result
Labor	Arthur Greenup		75.0	+7.9
Independent	William Cole		25.0	+25.0
Labor hold		Swing	+7.9	

== See also ==
- Electoral results for the Division of Dalley
- List of Australian federal by-elections
