= Phil O'Neill =

Australian politician (1941–2020)

Phillip Joseph O'Neill (6 June 1941 – 7 January 2020) was an Australian politician. He was the Labor member for Burwood in the New South Wales Legislative Assembly from 1978 to 1984.

O'Neill was born in Darlinghurst to Sidney Lessor O'Neill and Isabel Emily Cassel. He was educated at Catholic schools in Enfield and Ashfield, becoming a clerk. In 1962, he joined the Labor Party. He was an administrative officer with the New South Wales Public Transport Commission and an executive member of the Australian Transport Officers' Federation. In 1969, he was elected to Burwood Council, serving until 1974 and again from 1977 to 1980. He was President of the Enfield branch of the ALP from 1971 to 1981. He married Janice Parnell on 29 March 1981.

In 1978 he was elected to the New South Wales Legislative Assembly as the Labor member for Burwood, defeating sitting Liberal MP John Jackett. He held the seat in 1981 but was defeated by Paul Zammit in 1984. Following his defeat, he returned to local politics, serving again on Burwood Council from 1987 to 2000.

New South Wales Legislative Assembly
Preceded by John Jackett	Member for Burwood; 1978–1984	Succeeded by Paul Zammit
