= Robert Howe (Australian politician) =

Australian politician

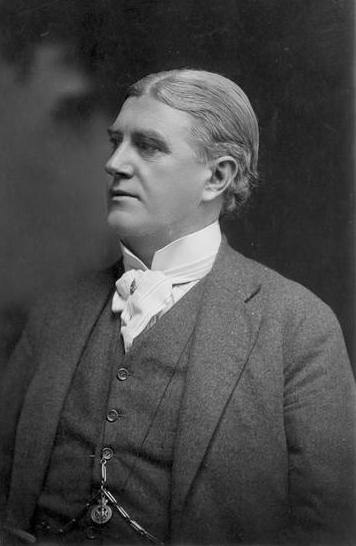

Member of the Australian Parliament for Dalley
- In office 13 April 1910 – 2 April 1915
- Preceded by: William Wilks
- Succeeded by: William Mahony

Personal details
- Born: 1861 Newcastle, England
- Died: 2 April 1915 (aged 53–54) Balmain, New South Wales, Australia
- Party: Australian Labor Party
- Occupation: Unionist

Robert Howe (1861 – 2 April 1915) was an Australian politician. He was an Australian Labor Party member of the Australian House of Representatives from 1910 until his death in office in 1915.

Howe was born in Newcastle in England, where he received a primary education. He migrated to Australia in 1882 and became a patternmaker and engineer, working for many years at the Cockatoo Island Dockyard. He was Sydney district secretary of the Amalgamated Society of Engineers, and represented the union before the Industrial Court in an early award inquiry.

He was elected to the Australian House of Representatives as the Labor member for Dalley at the 1910 election, defeating the sitting MP, William Wilks. He was re-elected at the 1913 election after fending off a challenge to his Labor preselection from Thomas Storey, but had a nervous breakdown after the election and missed the first session of that term of parliament. He recovered for some time, but became ill again in late 1914, and died at his Balmain house in April 1915.

Parliament of Australia
Preceded by William Wilks	Member for Dalley; 1910 – 1915	Succeeded by William Mahony
