= Harrie Mitchell =

Australian politician

Major Harrie Mitchell

Personal details
- Born: 27 June 1906 Warren, New South Wales
- Died: 5 February 1967 (aged 60) Sydney
- Party: United Australia Party

Harrie Robert Croft Mitchell (27 June 1906 – 5 February 1967) was an Australian politician and a member of the New South Wales Legislative Assembly for a single term between 1938 and 1941. He was a member of the United Australia Party

== Early life ==
Mitchell was born in Warren, New South Wales and was the son of a police constable. He was educated at Bathurst High School and the University of Sydney, graduating with a Bachelor of Arts degree in 1929. Mitchell was called to the bar in 1936 but reverted to the solicitors' roll in 1944. He had extensive business interests and was the director of several companies including a brewery and two building societies. Mitchell enlisted in the Second Australian Imperial Force at the commencement of World War Two and obtained the rank of Major. He was posted to an artillery unit in North-Western Australia. Despite having not served overseas he became an office holder in several organisations for war veterans including the World Veterans Federation. He also served on a number of Quangos including the New South Wales Central Ambulance Board and the Commonwealth Advisory Committee on Immigration.

== State Parliament ==
Mitchell entered parliament as the United Australia Party member for Burwood after winning the seat at the 1938 state election. He won 51% of the vote and defeated the only other candidate, the incumbent member Gordon Jackett. Unusually, Jackett had also been endorsed by the UAP. This was indicative of the growing disunity and lack of organizational strength within the UAP. To forestall pre-selection ballots, the party's central committee, of which Mitchell was a member, had declared 11 metropolitan seats including Burwood to be "safe seats" and had endorsed multiple candidates. At the next state election in 1941, Jackett stood as an Independent "Nationalist UAP" candidate and defeated Mitchell who finished third with 28% of the vote behind Jackett and the Labor Party candidate, Albert Thompson. Thompson won a remarkable 38% of the vote due to the large statewide swing to Labor at the election. After an absence of 9 years, Mitchell again nominated for Burwood at the 1950 state election. He stood as an Independent and was easily defeated by Jackett who was the endorsed candidate of the Liberal Party. This was the last state election that Mitchell contested. He did not hold party, parliamentary or ministerial office.

New South Wales Legislative Assembly
Preceded by Gordon Jackett	Member for Burwood; 1938–1941	Succeeded by Gordon Jackett
