= John Jackett (politician) =

Australian politician

John Gordon Thorne Jackett (21 October 1912 – 11 January 2003) was an Australian politician. He was the Liberal member for Burwood in the New South Wales Legislative Assembly from 1965 to 1978.

Jackett was born in Unley, South Australia, to Gordon Jackett (NSW MLA 1935–1938, 1941–1951) and his wife Ethel May Martin. The family moved to New South Wales in 1918, and Jackett was educated at The King's School, Parramatta, after which he joined the family business. In 1940, he enlisted in the AIF, serving in the Middle East, Darwin and New Guinea until 1945. In 1953, he was elected to Burwood Council, where he served until 1962. In 1961, Jackett married Bethyl Margaret McKerihan, with whom he had two children.

In 1965, Jackett contested Liberal preselection for the state seat of Burwood and defeated the sitting member, Ben Doig. Doig contested the election as an independent, but Jackett was elected fairly easily. He defeated Doig again in 1968 and 1971 and was re-elected in 1973 and 1976. In 1978, he was defeated by Labor candidate Phil O'Neill. Jackett died in Sydney in 2003.

New South Wales Legislative Assembly
Preceded by Ben Doig	Member for Burwood; 1965–1978	Succeeded by Phil O'Neill
