= William Mahony (politician, born 1877) =

Australian politician (1877–1962)

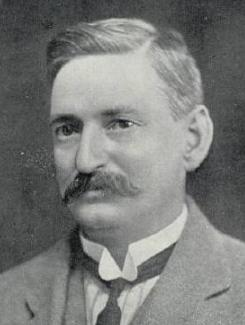

Member of the Australian Parliament for Dalley
- In office 6 May 1915 – 18 January 1927
- Preceded by: Robert Howe
- Succeeded by: Ted Theodore

Personal details
- Born: 1877 Ireland
- Died: 28 August 1962 (aged 84–85)
- Party: Australian Labor Party
- Occupation: Grocer's assistant

William George Mahony (1877 – 28 August 1962) was an Australian politician.

Born in Ireland, Mahony migrated to Australia as a child. He was raised in Balmain, where he received a primary education before becoming a grocer's assistant. He was the first secretary of the Grocers' Assistants' Union, and was involved in its amalgamation into the Shop Assistants' Union.

In the by-election that resulted from the death of Robert Howe in 1915, Mahony was elected unopposed to the Australian House of Representatives as the Labor member for Dalley. He held the seat until 1927, when he resigned and was succeeded by the former Premier of Queensland, Ted Theodore. Following his resignation, he purchased a sub-lease of the Commercial Hotel at Balmain East in June 1927, but sold it again in November.

A 1928 Royal Commission found that Mahony had been bribed to resign from the Parliament, probably by or for Theodore, but proof was never found. Mahony had emphatically denied the allegations, and claimed that he had won the money gambling on horse-racing. He attempted to make a comeback at the 1928 federal election, but was defeated for Labor preselection to contest a New South Wales seat in the Australian Senate.

In 1929, Mahony was working as a casual assistant in the ambulance room at the Cockatoo Island Dockyard. In the 1940s, Mahony was the industrial organiser for the Australian Red Cross. His wife, Annie, died in 1942; their only son John died at 36 in 1946, and their daughter Amy in 1948. Mahony died in 1962.

His brother, Robert Mahony, was a member of the New South Wales Legislative Council.

Parliament of Australia
Preceded by Robert Howe	Member for Dalley; 1915–1927	Succeeded by Ted Theodore
