= Sol Rosevear =

Australian politician (1892–1953)

The Honourable Sol Rosevear
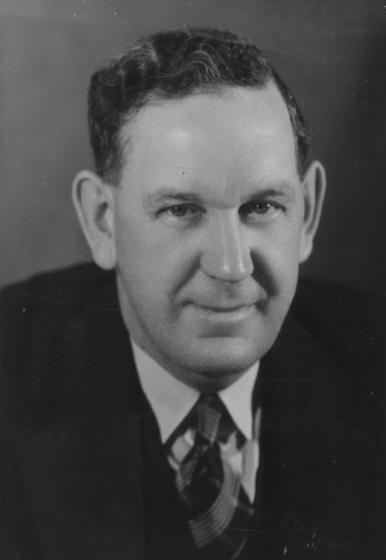

Speaker of the Australian House of Representatives
- In office 22 June 1943 – 21 February 1950
- Preceded by: Walter Nairn
- Succeeded by: Archie Cameron

Member of the Australian Parliament for Dalley
- In office 19 December 1931 – 21 March 1953
- Preceded by: Ted Theodore
- Succeeded by: Arthur Greenup

Personal details
- Born: 4 January 1892 Pyrmont, New South Wales, Australia
- Died: 21 March 1953 (aged 61) Lewisham, New South Wales, Australia
- Party: NSW Labor (1931–36); Labor (1936–40); Labor (N-C) (1940–41); Labor (1941–53)
- Spouse: Clara White (m. 1916)
- Occupation: Timber worker

John Solomon "Sol" Rosevear (4 January 1892 – 21 March 1953) was an Australian politician. He was Speaker of the Australian House of Representatives from 1943 to 1950. He was a member of the Australian Labor Party (ALP) and represented the seat of Dalley in the House of Representatives from 1931 until his death in 1953. He was associated with the Lang Labor faction until the early 1940s. Prior to entering parliament he was a timber worker and trade unionist.

== Early life ==
Rosevear was born on 4 January 1892 in Pyrmont, Sydney, New South Wales. He was the seventh child of Maria (née McGuirk) and William John Rosevear. His father was a carter. Rosevear attended the local public school before beginning work in the timber industry, where he became known as a skilled tradesman. He married Clara May White on 23 September 1916, with whom he had two children.

Rosevear became involved in the labour movement at a young age as a member of the Timber Workers' Union. He was active in the Leichhardt branch of the ALP and served as president of the electorate council for Dalley. He managed Ted Theodore's campaign at the 1929 federal election. In the same year, Rosevear played an active role in a big strike within the timber industry. He lost his job and led the Leichhardt Unemployed Workers' Relief Movement during the Great Depression. He registered for the dole, and was due to receive his first payment on the day he was elected to federal parliament.

== Politics ==
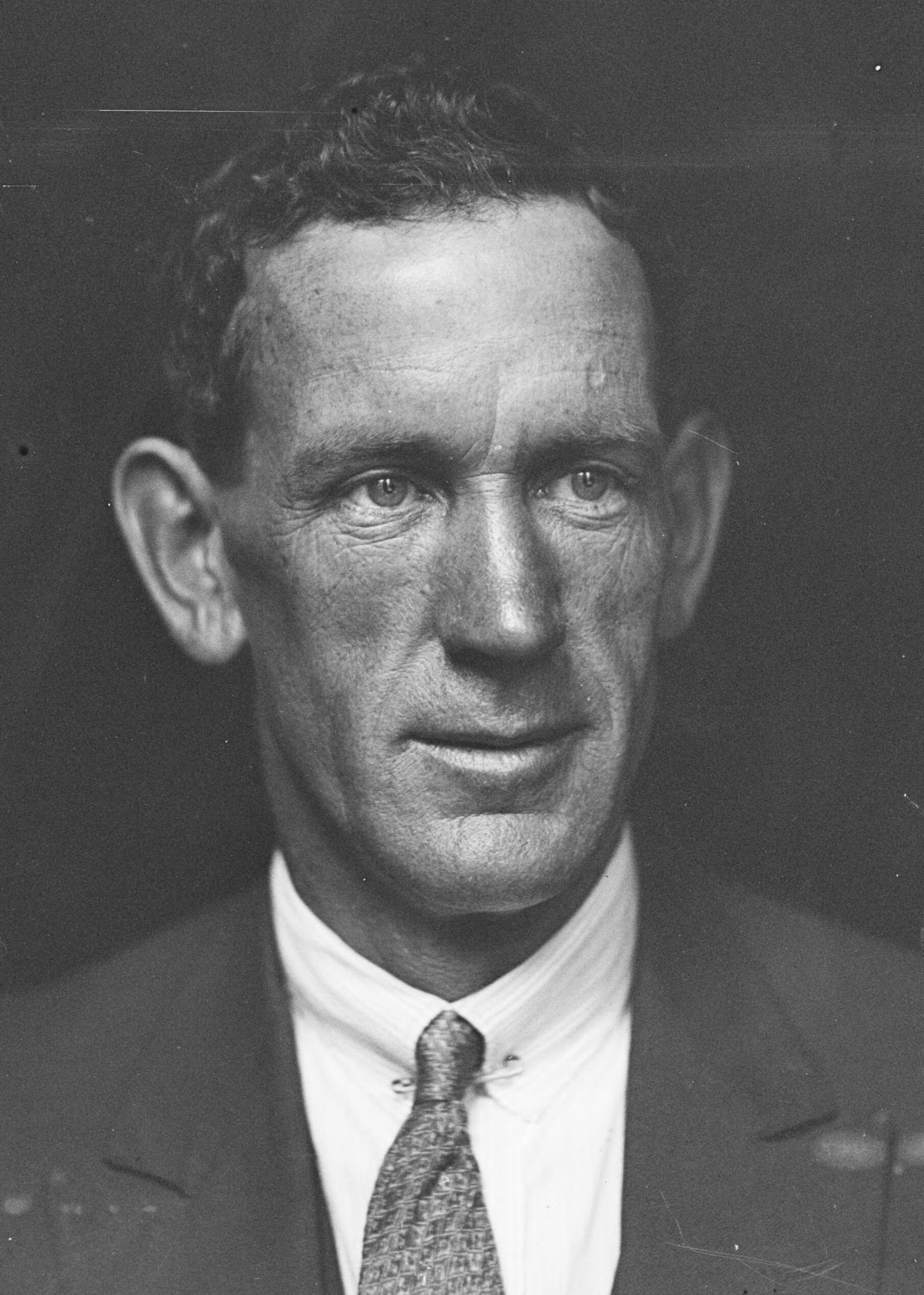
Sol Rosevear

Rosevear was an Australian Labor Party official and organised Ted Theodore's campaign in 1929. After the 1931 Labor split, however, Rosevear joined the Lang Labor breakaway and defeated Theodore in his seat of Dalley in the election of that year. He sat in the House of Representatives under the leadership of Jack Beasley until 1936, when the two factions reunited. Following the second split of 1940, Rosevear was deputy-leader of the Australian Labor Party (Non-Communist).

In 1941, John Curtin reunited the Labor Party and Rosevear rejoined the ALP. In July 1942, under special wartime circumstances, he was appointed Controller of Footwear and Leather Supplies within the Department of Supply and Development. By ministerial decree in November 1942, he was given the power to regulate the manufacture of footwear and materials for the manufacture of footwear.

=== Speaker of the House ===
Rosevear was disappointed not to receive a cabinet post, but was appointed Speaker of the House of Representatives on 22 June 1943. He gained a reputation as an inflexible Speaker, accused by the media and the Opposition of partisanship; journalist E.H. Cox claimed that he was "frequently drunk in the Chair". Rosevear also permitted illegal gambling in the Chamber, and participated himself.

Rosevear continued to be influential in caucus, and it was rumoured that he hoped to succeed Ben Chifley as party leader, but his "taste for grog" was seen as a disqualification by some. In the 1949 election the Chifley government was defeated by the Liberal/Country Party coalition led by Prime Minister Robert Menzies and Rosevear lost the Speakership. He continued to sit in the House until his death of coronary occlusion on 21 March 1953 (aged 61). He was survived by his wife, a son and a daughter. A portrait of Rosevear by Joshua Smith won the Archibald Prize in 1944.

Australian House of Representatives
Preceded by Walter Nairn	Speaker of the Australian House of Representatives; 1943–1949	Succeeded by Archie Cameron
Preceded by Ted Theodore	Member for Dalley; 1931–1953	Succeeded by Arthur Greenup
