= Electoral district of Newtown-Annandale =

Former state electoral district of New South Wales, Australia

Newtown-Annandale was an electoral district of the Legislative Assembly in the Australian state of New South Wales. It was created in 1950, mainly succeeding Newtown and Annandale. It was abolished in 1953.

== Members for Newtown-Annandale ==
Member	Party	Term
Arthur Greenup	Labor	1950–1953

== Election results ==
=== 1950 ===
1950 New South Wales state election: Newtown-Annandale
Party	Candidate	Votes	%	±%
Labor	Arthur Greenup	11,990	56.1	
Lang Labor	Lilian Fowler	8,555	40.0	
Communist	Daisy Lewin	836	3.9	
Total formal votes		21,381	96.6	
Informal votes		750	3.4	
Turnout		22,131	93.5	
Labor notional hold				

- Preferences were not distributed.
Netown-Annandale was a notional Labor seat combining parts of the abolished districts of Newtown and Annandale. Lilian Fowler (Lang Labor) was the member for Newtown.
