= Arthur Greenup =

Australian politician (1902–1980)

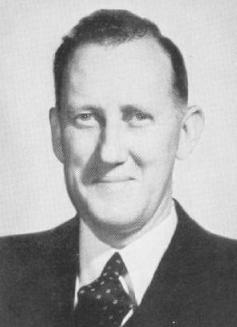

Member of the Australian Parliament for Dalley
- In office 9 May 1953 – 4 November 1955
- Preceded by: Sol Rosevear
- Succeeded by: William O'Connor

Member of the New South Wales Legislative Assembly for Newtown-Annandale
- In office 17 June 1950 – 14 February 1953
- Preceded by: District created
- Succeeded by: District abolished

Sydney City Councillor for Newtown
- In office 4 December 1948 – 1 December 1950
- Preceded by: New ward

Mayor of Newtown
- In office 10 December 1941 – 6 December 1943
- Preceded by: Isidore Ryan
- Succeeded by: Patrick Walters

Alderman of the Municipality of Newtown for O’Connell Ward
- In office 5 December 1938 – 31 December 1948
- Succeeded by: Council abolished

Personal details
- Born: 11 July 1902 Sydney
- Died: 3 August 1980 (aged 78)
- Party: Australian Labor Party
- Profession: Union official

Arthur Edward Greenup (11 July 1902 – 3 August 1980) was a trade unionist and politician in New South Wales, Australia.

== Early life ==
Born in Sydney, he became a shop assistant at the age of 14. He was an organiser and eventually the President of the Shop Assistants' Union.

== Political career ==
In 1938 he was elected an alderman for the Municipality of Newtown, serving until the council was abolished in 1948. He served as Mayor of Newtown for 2 years, from December 1941 until December 1943. Under the Local Government (Areas) Act 1948, Newtown became a ward of Sydney City Council and Greenup was elected one of four aldermen, serving until 1 December 1950.

In June 1950 he was elected to the New South Wales Legislative Assembly as the member for Newtown-Annandale, representing the Labor Party. He defeated the sitting Lang Labor member for Newtown, Lilian Fowler.

The district of Newtown-Annandale was abolished as a result of the 1952 redistribution, and Greenup was defeated in the preselection contest for Marrickville. Greenup transferred to federal politics as the Labor candidate for the House of Representatives seat of Dalley, located in the inner suburbs of Sydney, including Balmain, Glebe and Leichhardt. Greenup was successful at the by-election on 9 May 1953, but only held the seat until 1955, when he again lost Labor preselection.

== Later life and death ==
Greenup worked for the shop assistants division of the Australian Workers Union, initially as an organiser and as vice president of the division from 1973 until 1977.

He died at Five Dock on 3 August 1980 (aged 78).

Civic offices
Preceded by Isidore Ryan	Mayor of Newtown; 1941–1943	Succeeded by Patrick Joseph Walters
New South Wales Legislative Assembly
New district	Member for Newtown-Annandale; 1950–1953	District abolished
Australian House of Representatives
Preceded by Sol Rosevear	Member for Dalley; 1953–1955	Succeeded by William O'Connor
