= George Weir (Australian politician) =

Australian politician

The Honourable George Weir

Minister for Conservation
- In office 9 May 1946 – 3 November 1952
- Premier: William McKell; James McGirr; Joseph Cahill
- Preceded by: Bill Dunn
- Succeeded by: George Enticknap

Personal details
- Born: 21 April 1903 Flemington, New South Wales
- Died: 4 July 1956 (aged 53) Five Dock, New South Wales
- Party: Labor Party

George Weir (21 April 1903 – 4 July 1956) was an Australian barrister and politician who was a member of the New South Wales Legislative Assembly from 1941 to 1953.

== Early life ==
Weir was born in Flemington. He was the son of George Weir, telegraphist, and Alice Ada Evans. He received his education at Burwood Public School and Parramatta High School. In 1926, he received his Bachelor of Laws from the University of Sydney. In 1920, he entered public service as a junior clerk in Crown Solicitors Office, where he remained until 1927. Weir was admitted to the bar in 1926. He transferred to Public Trustees Office as a conveyancing clerk in 1927. On 24 March 1928, he married Elsie Rose Gentle, with whom he had two sons.

Rapidly rising through the ranks, he was chief clerk at the Probate Office from 1933 until 1939. He was appointed to the executive of the Public Service Association of New South Wales in 1933 and served as president from 1936 to 1939. He was also elected president of the Australian Public Service Federation in 1937 and served until 1939. Weir resigned from the Public Service in 1939 to go to the bar.

== Political career ==
In 1940, Weir ran in his first by-election in Croydon, New South Wales to replace former Premier Bertram Stevens. David Hunter of the United Australia Party won the seat.

Weir was elected to Parliament 1941 for the seat of Dulwich Hill, New South Wales, as a member of the Labor Party. He retained the seat until 1953. While a Member of Parliament, Weir served as an assistant minister in 1946. Weir was also chairman of directors of Association of Co-operative Building Societies from 1943 to 1946. Between 1946 and 1952, he was the Minister of Conservation. For a brief time in 1952, he was the acting minister for transport. In 1952–53, he was a minister without portfolio. Weir resigned from parliament in 1953, when he was appointed as a judge for the Industrial Relations Commission of New South Wales, where he remained until 1956. On 17 December 1952, in his position as the acting minister for transport, Weir opened the Hexham Bridge, New South Wales.

== Later life and death ==
From 1953 until 1956, he served as chairman of the Crown Employees Appeal Board. In 1954, he was the president of the Men of the Land Society. Weir died at Five Dock from a heart attack on 4 July 1956. His funeral was held at the Rookwood Cemetery in the Church of England section.

== Books ==
- Probate Law and Practice: Being the Wills, Probate and Administration Act 1898-1939 (N.S.W.), with Rules thereunder, Exhaustively Annotated: Together with a Collection of Acts, Local and Imperial, Dealing with Such Matters and with Appendices of Forms and Other Practice Matters, with Roland Hastings, Simmons Ltd., 1939
- 50 Years of Labor in Politics, Industrial Publications, [1945?]
- Probate Law and Practice: Being the Wills, Probate and Administration Act 1898-1947 (N.S.W.), with Rules thereunder, Exhaustively Annotated: Together with a Collection of Acts, Local and Imperial, Dealing with Such Matters and with Appendices of Forms and Other Practice Matters, with Roland Hastings and assisted by from H.W. Gulliver, Simmons Ltd., 1948

New South Wales Legislative Assembly
Preceded by Guy Arkins	Member for Dulwich Hill; 1941–1953	Succeeded by Cliff Mallam
Political offices
Preceded by Bill Dunn	Minister for Conservation; 1946–1952	Succeeded by George Enticknap
