= Leslie Parr =

Australian politician

Dr Leslie Parr

Personal details
- Born: 15 June 1897 Rockdale, New South Wales
- Died: 3 December 1956 (aged 59) Summer Hill, New South Wales
- Party: Liberal Party

Dr Leslie James Albert Parr (15 June 1897 – 3 December 1956) was an Australian politician and a member of the New South Wales Legislative Assembly from 1951 until his death. He was a member of the Liberal Party.

Parr was born in Rockdale, New South Wales, attending Sydney Boys High School in 1910–14. He was the son of a draper and graduated from the medical faculty of the University of Sydney. He initially worked as a general practitioner but then specialized in Rheumatology and was the foundation president of the Australian Rheumatology Association. During World War Two he served with the Royal Australian Army Medical Corps and reached the rank of Major. Following the war he joined the Liberal Party and was elected the state president. On March 4, 1946 he donated land to The Crusader Union of Australia which would go on to be used as a Christian campsite in Lake Macquarie. After an unsuccessful attempt to win the seat of Dulwich Hill at the 1950 state election. Parr was elected to the New South Wales Parliament as the Liberal member for the seat of Burwood at the 1951 by-election caused by the death of the sitting Liberal member Gordon Jackett. He retained the seat at the next election but died as the sitting member in 1956. He did not hold party, parliamentary or ministerial office.

On his death Parr endowed the Parr Rheumatic Prize (now known as the Triennial Parr Prize in Rheumatology) which is awarded every three years by the Australian Rheumatology Association for an important contribution to rheumatology research.

New South Wales Legislative Assembly
Preceded by Gordon Jackett	Member for Burwood; 1951 – 1956	Succeeded by Ben Doig
