= Gordon Jackett =

Australian politician

Personal details
- Born: 6 July 1887 Laura, South Australia
- Died: 3 May 1951 (aged 63) Strathfield, New South Wales
- Party: United Australia Party, Democratic Party, Liberal Party, Independent

Harry Gordon Jackett (6 July 1887 – 3 May 1951) was an Australian politician and a member of the New South Wales Legislative Assembly from 1935 and 1938 and from 1941 until his death. He was variously a United Australia Party (UAP), Independent UAP, Democratic Party and Liberal Party member of parliament.

Jackett was born in Laura, South Australia and educated in Adelaide. His father owned a flour milling business which Jackett inherited and enlarged. He commenced a branch of the business in Strathfield, New South Wales in 1918. Jackett was an alderman on Burwood Municipal Council between 1922 and 1935 and was elected mayor in 1935. Jackett was elected to the New South Wales Parliament as the United Australia Party member for Burwood at the 1935 state election, succeeding the retiring UAP member Thomas Henley. At the 1938 election, the UAP endorsed both Jackett and Harrie Mitchell. Mitchell won the seat but Jackett regained it as an Independent UAP candidate in 1941. He successfully contested the seat as a Democratic Party candidate in 1944 and was a foundation member of the Liberal Party in 1946. He died in office in 1951. He did not hold parliamentary, party or ministerial office. His son, John Jackett, was also a member of the Legislative Assembly.

New South Wales Legislative Assembly
Preceded by Sir Thomas Henley	Member for Burwood; 1935 – 1938	Succeeded by Harrie Mitchell
Preceded by Harrie Mitchell	Member for Burwood; 1941 – 1951	Succeeded by Leslie Parr
