= Electoral district of Burwood (New South Wales) =

State electoral district of New South Wales, Australia

Burwood was an electoral district of the Legislative Assembly in the Australian state of New South Wales named after and including the Sydney suburb of Burwood. It was originally created in 1894, when multi-member districts were abolished, and the four member Canterbury was largely divided between Ashfield, Burwood, Canterbury, Petersham and St George. In 1920, with the introduction of proportional representation, it was absorbed into Ryde, along with Drummoyne, Gordon and Willoughby. It was recreated in 1927, but was abolished in 1988 and partly replaced by Strathfield.

== Members for Burwood ==
First incarnation (1894–1920)
Member	Party	Term
William McMillan	Free Trade	1894–1898
William Archer	Independent	1898–1904
Thomas Henley	Liberal Reform	1904–1917
Thomas Henley	Nationalist	1917–1920
Second incarnation (1927–1988)
Member	Party	Term
Sir Thomas Henley	Nationalist	1927–1932
Sir Thomas Henley	United Australia	1932–1935
Gordon Jackett (Note: Gordon Jackett was the father of John Jackett.)	United Australia	1935–1938
Harrie Mitchell	United Australia	1938–1941
Gordon Jackett	Ind. United Australia	1941–1944
Gordon Jackett	Democratic	1944–1945
Gordon Jackett	Liberal	1945–1951
Leslie Parr	Liberal	1951–1956
Ben Doig	Liberal	1957–1965
Ben Doig	Independent	1965–1965
John Jackett	Liberal	1965–1978
Phil O'Neill	Labor	1978–1984
Paul Zammit	Liberal	1984–1988

== Election results ==
1984 New South Wales state election: Burwood
Party	Candidate	Votes	%	±%
Liberal	Paul Zammit	14,377	49.9	+8.1
Labor	Phil O'Neill	13,556	47.1	−8.1
Democrats	Stephen Kirkham	857	3.0	−0.1
Total formal votes		28,790	97.4	+0.9
Informal votes		775	2.6	−0.9
Turnout		29,565	92.8	+2.5
Two-party-preferred result
Liberal	Paul Zammit	14,802	51.6	+8.8
Labor	Phil O'Neill	13,869	48.4	−8.8
Liberal gain from Labor		Swing	+8.8	
