= Electoral results for the district of Kogarah =

Election results for Kogarah, New South Wales, Australia

Kogarah, an electoral district of the Legislative Assembly in the Australian state of New South Wales, has had one incarnation, from 1930 until the present.

== Members ==
| Election | Member | Party |
|---|---|---|
| 1930 | Mark Gosling | Labor |
| 1932 | James Ross | United Australia |
| 1935 | James Ross | United Australia |
| 1938 | James Ross | United Australia |
| 1941 | William Currey | Labor |
| 1944 | William Currey | Labor |
| 1947 | William Currey | Labor |
| 1948 by | Douglas Cross | Liberal |
| 1950 | Douglas Cross | Liberal |
| 1953 | Bill Crabtree | Labor |
| 1956 | Bill Crabtree | Labor |
| 1959 | Bill Crabtree | Labor |
| 1962 | Bill Crabtree | Labor |
| 1965 | Bill Crabtree | Labor |
| 1968 | Bill Crabtree | Labor |
| 1971 | Bill Crabtree | Labor |
| 1973 | Bill Crabtree | Labor |
| 1976 | Bill Crabtree | Labor |
| 1978 | Bill Crabtree | Labor |
| 1981 | Bill Crabtree | Labor |
| 1983 by | Brian Langton | Labor |
| 1984 | Brian Langton | Labor |
| 1988 | Brian Langton | Labor |
| 1991 | Brian Langton | Labor |
| 1995 | Brian Langton | Labor |
| 1999 | Cherie Burton | Labor |
| 2003 | Cherie Burton | Labor |
| 2007 | Cherie Burton | Labor |
| 2011 | Cherie Burton | Labor |
| 2015 | Chris Minns | Labor |
| 2019 | Chris Minns | Labor |
| 2023 | Chris Minns | Labor |

== Election results ==
=== Elections in the 2020s ===
==== 2023 ====
2023 New South Wales state election: Kogarah
| Party | Candidate | Votes | % | ±% |
|---|---|---|---|---|
| Labor | Chris Minns | 30,916 | 60.6 | +19.7 |
| Liberal | Craig Chung | 14,380 | 28.2 | −15.4 |
| Greens | Tracy Yuen | 3,511 | 6.9 | +0.5 |
| Independent | Troy Stolz | 2,186 | 4.3 | +4.3 |
| Total formal votes | | 50,993 | 96.0 | +0.3 |
| Informal votes | | 2,145 | 4.0 | −0.3 |
| Turnout | | 53,138 | 89.2 | +0.4 |
Two-party-preferred result
| Labor | Chris Minns | 33,393 | 68.3 | +18.1 |
| Liberal | Craig Chung | 15,523 | 31.7 | −18.1 |
| Labor hold | | Swing | +18.1 | |

=== Elections in the 2010s ===
==== 2019 ====
2019 New South Wales state election: Kogarah
| Party | Candidate | Votes | % | ±% |
|---|---|---|---|---|
| Labor | Chris Minns | 19,254 | 42.25 | −3.17 |
| Liberal | Scott Yung | 19,185 | 42.09 | +7.92 |
| Greens | Greta Werner | 2,950 | 6.47 | −0.02 |
| One Nation | Phillip Pollard | 2,790 | 6.12 | +6.12 |
| Keep Sydney Open | Natalie Resman | 1,397 | 3.07 | +3.07 |
| Total formal votes | | 45,576 | 95.56 | +0.13 |
| Informal votes | | 2,120 | 4.44 | −0.13 |
| Turnout | | 47,696 | 89.61 | −0.91 |
Two-party-preferred result
| Labor | Chris Minns | 21,544 | 51.77 | −5.09 |
| Liberal | Scott Yung | 20,073 | 48.23 | +5.09 |
| Labor hold | | Swing | −5.09 | |

==== 2015 ====
2015 New South Wales state election: Kogarah
| Party | Candidate | Votes | % | ±% |
|---|---|---|---|---|
| Labor | Chris Minns | 21,084 | 45.4 | −2.0 |
| Liberal | Nick Aroney | 15,866 | 34.2 | −3.9 |
| Unity | Annie Tang | 3,647 | 7.9 | +7.9 |
| Greens | Brent Heber | 3,015 | 6.5 | −2.3 |
| Christian Democrats | Sonny Susilo | 1,638 | 3.5 | −2.2 |
| No Land Tax | David Lin | 1,173 | 2.5 | +2.5 |
| Total formal votes | | 46,423 | 95.4 | +0.2 |
| Informal votes | | 2,225 | 4.6 | −0.2 |
| Turnout | | 48,648 | 90.5 | +1.8 |
Two-party-preferred result
| Labor | Chris Minns | 23,058 | 56.9 | +1.5 |
| Liberal | Nick Aroney | 17,492 | 43.1 | −1.5 |
| Labor hold | | Swing | +1.5 | |

==== 2011 ====
2011 New South Wales state election: Kogarah
| Party | Candidate | Votes | % | ±% |
|---|---|---|---|---|
| Labor | Cherie Burton | 19,668 | 44.2 | −12.6 |
| Liberal | Miray Hindi | 18,360 | 41.3 | +14.3 |
| Greens | Simone Francis | 3,952 | 8.9 | +1.8 |
| Christian Democrats | Joseph Abdel Massih | 2,507 | 5.6 | +1.6 |
| Total formal votes | | 44,487 | 96.0 | −0.8 |
| Informal votes | | 1,851 | 4.0 | +0.8 |
| Turnout | | 46,338 | 93.2 | |
Two-party-preferred result
| Labor | Cherie Burton | 21,207 | 51.9 | −15.8 |
| Liberal | Miray Hindi | 19,665 | 48.1 | +15.8 |
| Labor hold | | Swing | −15.8 | |

=== Elections in the 2000s ===
==== 2007 ====
2007 New South Wales state election: Kogarah
| Party | Candidate | Votes | % | ±% |
|---|---|---|---|---|
| Labor | Cherie Burton | 24,301 | 56.8 | −2.2 |
| Liberal | Peter El Khouri | 11,534 | 27.0 | −0.9 |
| Greens | Therese Bolt | 3,042 | 7.1 | +0.5 |
| Unity | Marcus Ho | 2,172 | 5.1 | +0.6 |
| Christian Democrats | Chris Svolos | 1,708 | 4.0 | +4.0 |
| Total formal votes | | 42,757 | 96.8 | 0.0 |
| Informal votes | | 1,396 | 3.2 | 0.0 |
| Turnout | | 44,153 | 93.2 | |
Two-party-preferred result
| Labor | Cherie Burton | 26,448 | 67.7 | −1.4 |
| Liberal | Peter El Khouri | 12,616 | 32.3 | +1.4 |
| Labor hold | | Swing | −1.4 | |

==== 2003 ====
2003 New South Wales state election: Kogarah
| Party | Candidate | Votes | % | ±% |
|---|---|---|---|---|
| Labor | Cherie Burton | 23,778 | 59.2 | +11.2 |
| Liberal | Val Colyer | 11,209 | 27.9 | −6.9 |
| Greens | Soraya Kassim | 2,749 | 6.8 | +3.6 |
| Unity | Naxin Liu | 1,736 | 4.3 | +1.3 |
| Democrats | Alison Bailey | 701 | 1.7 | +1.7 |
| Total formal votes | | 40,173 | 96.8 | −0.1 |
| Informal votes | | 1,344 | 3.2 | +0.1 |
| Turnout | | 41,517 | 92.5 | |
Two-party-preferred result
| Labor | Cherie Burton | 26,355 | 69.2 | +11.7 |
| Liberal | Val Colyer | 11,703 | 30.8 | −11.7 |
| Labor hold | | Swing | +11.7 | |

=== Elections in the 1990s ===
==== 1999 ====
1999 New South Wales state election: Kogarah
| Party | Candidate | Votes | % | ±% |
|---|---|---|---|---|
| Labor | Cherie Burton | 19,628 | 48.0 | +1.9 |
| Liberal | Sam Witheridge | 14,226 | 34.8 | −10.6 |
| One Nation | Neil Baird | 1,752 | 4.3 | +4.3 |
| Greens | Dominic Kanak | 1,301 | 3.2 | +3.2 |
| Unity | Ilia Uzunoski | 1,244 | 3.0 | +3.0 |
| Independent | Polly Chan | 1,039 | 2.5 | +2.5 |
| Christian Democrats | Mark Ison | 838 | 2.0 | +0.5 |
| Independent | Les Crompton | 368 | 0.9 | +0.9 |
| AAFI | John Whalen | 237 | 0.6 | −0.3 |
| Outdoor Recreation | Nathan Jones | 235 | 0.6 | +0.6 |
| Non-Custodial Parents | Alexander Peniazev | 40 | 0.1 | +0.1 |
| Total formal votes | | 40,908 | 96.9 | +2.2 |
| Informal votes | | 1,308 | 3.1 | −2.2 |
| Turnout | | 42,216 | 92.6 | |
Two-party-preferred result
| Labor | Cherie Burton | 21,381 | 57.5 | +6.9 |
| Liberal | Sam Witheridge | 15,784 | 42.5 | −6.9 |
| Labor hold | | Swing | +6.9 | |

==== 1995 ====
1995 New South Wales state election: Kogarah
| Party | Candidate | Votes | % | ±% |
|---|---|---|---|---|
| Labor | Brian Langton | 16,047 | 48.0 | −1.5 |
| Liberal | Margaret Dombkins | 14,981 | 44.8 | +0.2 |
| Democrats | Craig Chung | 1,664 | 5.0 | −0.9 |
| Call to Australia | David Copeland | 713 | 2.1 | +2.1 |
| Total formal votes | | 33,405 | 95.0 | +6.2 |
| Informal votes | | 1,741 | 5.0 | −6.2 |
| Turnout | | 35,146 | 93.9 | |
Two-party-preferred result
| Labor | Brian Langton | 16,912 | 51.5 | −1.8 |
| Liberal | Margaret Dombkins | 15,935 | 48.5 | +1.8 |
| Labor hold | | Swing | −1.8 | |

==== 1991 ====
1991 New South Wales state election: Kogarah
| Party | Candidate | Votes | % | ±% |
|---|---|---|---|---|
| Labor | Brian Langton | 15,376 | 49.5 | +5.1 |
| Liberal | Pat O'Brien | 13,873 | 44.7 | +0.8 |
| Democrats | John Mukai | 1,819 | 5.9 | +5.9 |
| Total formal votes | | 31,068 | 88.8 | −7.7 |
| Informal votes | | 3,917 | 11.2 | +7.7 |
| Turnout | | 34,985 | 93.6 | |
Two-party-preferred result
| Labor | Brian Langton | 16,270 | 53.3 | +1.7 |
| Liberal | Pat O'Brien | 14,254 | 46.7 | −1.7 |
| Labor hold | | Swing | +1.7 | |

=== Elections in the 1980s ===
==== 1988 ====
1988 New South Wales state election: Kogarah
| Party | Candidate | Votes | % | ±% |
|---|---|---|---|---|
| Labor | Brian Langton | 13,033 | 44.4 | −8.8 |
| Liberal | Stephen Milgate | 12,840 | 43.7 | +2.7 |
| Independent | Anne Field | 2,663 | 9.1 | +9.1 |
| Independent | Jack Maddox | 831 | 2.8 | +2.8 |
| Total formal votes | | 29,367 | 96.4 | −0.9 |
| Informal votes | | 1,086 | 3.6 | +0.9 |
| Turnout | | 30,453 | 94.3 | |
Two-party-preferred result
| Labor | Brian Langton | 14,738 | 52.2 | −4.2 |
| Liberal | Stephen Milgate | 13,509 | 47.8 | +4.2 |
| Labor hold | | Swing | −4.2 | |

==== 1984 ====
1984 New South Wales state election: Kogarah
| Party | Candidate | Votes | % | ±% |
|---|---|---|---|---|
| Labor | Brian Langton | 15,254 | 53.1 | −9.9 |
| Liberal | Robert Young | 11,804 | 41.0 | +8.8 |
| Democrats | Ronald George | 1,697 | 5.9 | +1.1 |
| Total formal votes | | 28,755 | 97.4 | −0.2 |
| Informal votes | | 780 | 2.6 | +0.2 |
| Turnout | | 29,535 | 93.7 | +1.8 |
Two-party-preferred result
| Labor | Brian Langton | | 56.3 | −3.6 |
| Liberal | Robert Young | | 43.7 | +3.6 |
| Labor hold | | Swing | −3.6 | |

==== 1983 by-election ====
1983 Kogarah by-election Saturday 22 October
| Party | Candidate | Votes | % | ±% |
|---|---|---|---|---|
| Labor | Brian Langton | 12,263 | 51.2 | −11.8 |
| Liberal | Robert Young | 11,679 | 48.8 | +16.6 |
| Total formal votes | | 23,942 | 98.2 | |
| Informal votes | | 449 | 1.8 | |
| Turnout | | 24,391 | 76.7 | |
| Labor hold | | Swing | −15.0 (Note: compared to the two-party-preferred result for the 1981 Kogarah election.) | |

Bill Crabtree (Labor) resigned.

==== 1981 ====
1981 New South Wales state election: Kogarah
| Party | Candidate | Votes | % | ±% |
|---|---|---|---|---|
| Labor | Bill Crabtree | 18,022 | 63.0 | −4.9 |
| Liberal | Patrick O'Brien | 9,198 | 32.2 | +0.1 |
| Democrats | Albert Ost | 1,374 | 4.8 | +4.8 |
| Total formal votes | | 28,594 | 97.2 | |
| Informal votes | | 816 | 2.8 | |
| Turnout | | 29,410 | 91.9 | |
Two-party-preferred result
| Labor | Bill Crabtree | 18,644 | 66.2 | −1.7 |
| Liberal | Patrick O'Brien | 9,498 | 33.8 | +1.7 |
| Labor hold | | Swing | −1.7 | |

=== Elections in the 1970s ===
==== 1978 ====
1978 New South Wales state election: Kogarah
| Party | Candidate | Votes | % | ±% |
|---|---|---|---|---|
| Labor | Bill Crabtree | 21,397 | 67.9 | +12.5 |
| Liberal | Terrence Fraser | 10,117 | 32.1 | −10.1 |
| Total formal votes | | 31,514 | 97.2 | −0.4 |
| Informal votes | | 897 | 2.8 | +0.4 |
| Turnout | | 32,411 | 93.0 | −1.3 |
| Labor hold | | Swing | +11.8 | |

==== 1976 ====
1976 New South Wales state election: Kogarah
| Party | Candidate | Votes | % | ±% |
|---|---|---|---|---|
| Labor | Bill Crabtree | 17,753 | 55.4 | +1.1 |
| Liberal | Terrence Fraser | 13,537 | 42.2 | +0.5 |
| Workers | Robert Schollbach | 761 | 2.4 | +2.4 |
| Total formal votes | | 32,051 | 98.6 | +0.7 |
| Informal votes | | 457 | 1.4 | −0.7 |
| Turnout | | 32,508 | 94.3 | +0.8 |
Two-party-preferred result
| Labor | Bill Crabtree | 17,981 | 56.1 | +1.0 |
| Liberal | Terrence Fraser | 14,070 | 43.9 | −1.0 |
| Labor hold | | Swing | +1.0 | |

==== 1973 ====
1973 New South Wales state election: Kogarah
| Party | Candidate | Votes | % | ±% |
|---|---|---|---|---|
| Labor | Bill Crabtree | 16,258 | 54.3 | −0.1 |
| Liberal | Edward Griffiths | 12,497 | 41.7 | +2.8 |
| Democratic Labor | Harold Rich | 1,195 | 4.0 | +4.0 |
| Total formal votes | | 29,950 | 97.9 | |
| Informal votes | | 635 | 2.1 | |
| Turnout | | 30,585 | 93.5 | |
Two-party-preferred result
| Labor | Bill Crabtree | 16,497 | 55.1 | −3.5 |
| Liberal | Edward Griffiths | 13,453 | 44.9 | +3.5 |
| Labor hold | | Swing | −3.5 | |

==== 1971 ====
1971 New South Wales state election: Kogarah
| Party | Candidate | Votes | % | ±% |
|---|---|---|---|---|
| Labor | Bill Crabtree | 13,438 | 52.4 | +1.6 |
| Liberal | William Marshall | 10,485 | 40.9 | −4.6 |
| Independent | Margot Caulfield | 1,708 | 6.7 | +6.7 |
| Total formal votes | | 25,631 | 98.1 | |
| Informal votes | | 495 | 1.9 | |
| Turnout | | 26,126 | 94.7 | |
Two-party-preferred result
| Labor | Bill Crabtree | 14,463 | 56.4 | +5.1 |
| Liberal | William Marshall | 11,168 | 43.6 | −5.1 |
| Labor hold | | Swing | +5.1 | |

=== Elections in the 1960s ===
==== 1968 ====
1968 New South Wales state election: Kogarah
| Party | Candidate | Votes | % | ±% |
|---|---|---|---|---|
| Labor | Bill Crabtree | 13,837 | 51.8 | +0.2 |
| Liberal | Albert Oakey | 11,889 | 44.5 | −1.2 |
| Democratic Labor | Brian Harnett | 986 | 3.7 | +1.0 |
| Total formal votes | | 26,712 | 97.9 | |
| Informal votes | | 568 | 2.1 | |
| Turnout | | 27,280 | 94.3 | |
Two-party-preferred result
| Labor | Bill Crabtree | 14,034 | 52.5 | +0.4 |
| Liberal | Albert Oakey | 12,678 | 47.5 | −0.4 |
| Labor hold | | Swing | +0.4 | |

==== 1965 ====
1965 New South Wales state election: Kogarah
| Party | Candidate | Votes | % | ±% |
|---|---|---|---|---|
| Labor | Bill Crabtree | 12,169 | 51.6 | −4.4 |
| Liberal | Albert Oakey | 10,790 | 45.7 | +1.7 |
| Democratic Labor | Hubert O'Connell | 635 | 2.7 | +2.7 |
| Total formal votes | | 23,594 | 98.5 | −0.6 |
| Informal votes | | 347 | 1.5 | +0.6 |
| Turnout | | 23,941 | 94.6 | +0.1 |
Two-party-preferred result
| Labor | Bill Crabtree | 12,296 | 52.1 | −3.9 |
| Liberal | Albert Oakey | 11,298 | 47.9 | +3.9 |
| Labor hold | | Swing | −3.9 | |

==== 1962 ====
1962 New South Wales state election: Kogarah
| Party | Candidate | Votes | % | ±% |
|---|---|---|---|---|
| Labor | Bill Crabtree | 13,007 | 56.0 | +2.7 |
| Liberal | John Partridge | 10,233 | 44.0 | +0.7 |
| Total formal votes | | 23,240 | 99.1 | |
| Informal votes | | 200 | 0.9 | |
| Turnout | | 23,440 | 94.5 | |
| Labor hold | | Swing | +1.1 | |

=== Elections in the 1950s ===
==== 1959 ====
1959 New South Wales state election: Kogarah
| Party | Candidate | Votes | % | ±% |
|---|---|---|---|---|
| Labor | Bill Crabtree | 12,079 | 53.3 | |
| Liberal | Jeffrey Skehan | 9,816 | 43.3 | |
| Democratic Labor | Thomas Brosnan | 404 | 1.8 | |
| Communist | Leslie McPhillips | 357 | 1.6 | |
| Total formal votes | | 22,656 | 98.6 | |
| Informal votes | | 329 | 1.4 | |
| Turnout | | 22,985 | 94.5 | |
Two-party-preferred result
| Labor | Bill Crabtree | 12,446 | 54.9 | |
| Liberal | Jeffrey Skehan | 10,210 | 45.1 | |
| Labor hold | | Swing | | |

==== 1956 ====
1956 New South Wales state election: Kogarah
| Party | Candidate | Votes | % | ±% |
|---|---|---|---|---|
| Labor | Bill Crabtree | 12,467 | 55.0 | −0.7 |
| Liberal | Horace Harper | 10,195 | 45.0 | +0.7 |
| Total formal votes | | 22,662 | 98.8 | +0.6 |
| Informal votes | | 276 | 1.2 | −0.6 |
| Turnout | | 22,938 | 94.1 | −0.5 |
| Labor hold | | Swing | −0.7 | |

==== 1953 ====
1953 New South Wales state election: Kogarah
| Party | Candidate | Votes | % | ±% |
|---|---|---|---|---|
| Labor | Bill Crabtree | 12,486 | 55.7 | |
| Liberal | Douglas Cross | 9,927 | 44.3 | |
| Total formal votes | | 22,413 | 98.2 | |
| Informal votes | | 405 | 1.8 | |
| Turnout | | 22,818 | 94.6 | |
| Labor gain from Liberal | | Swing | | |

==== 1950 ====
1950 New South Wales state election: Kogarah
| Party | Candidate | Votes | % | ±% |
|---|---|---|---|---|
| Liberal | Douglas Cross | 12,209 | 51.0 | |
| Labor | Bill Crabtree | 11,707 | 49.0 | |
| Total formal votes | | 23,916 | 98.5 | |
| Informal votes | | 354 | 1.5 | |
| Turnout | | 24,270 | 95.1 | |
| Liberal gain from Labor | | Swing | | |

Kogarah was won by the Liberal Party at a by-election in 1948 caused by the death of Labor's William Currey.

=== Elections in the 1940s ===
==== 1948 by-election ====
1948 Kogarah by-election Saturday 17 July
| Party | Candidate | Votes | % | ±% |
|---|---|---|---|---|
| Liberal | Douglas Cross | 12,829 | 51.7 | +9.1 |
| Labor | Herbert Oxford | 12,007 | 48.4 | −9.1 |
| Total formal votes | | 24,836 | 98.6 | +0.1 |
| Informal votes | | 361 | 1.4 | −0.1 |
| Turnout | | 25,197 | 90.8 | −4.3 |
| Liberal gain from Labor | | Swing | +9.1 | |

William Currey (Labor) died.

==== 1947 ====
1947 New South Wales state election: Kogarah
| Party | Candidate | Votes | % | ±% |
|---|---|---|---|---|
| Labor | William Currey | 14,445 | 57.4 | −3.3 |
| Liberal | George Evans | 10,713 | 42.6 | +13.6 |
| Total formal votes | | 25,158 | 98.5 | +1.5 |
| Informal votes | | 390 | 1.5 | −1.5 |
| Turnout | | 25,548 | 95.1 | +2.1 |
| Labor hold | | Swing | N/A | |

==== 1944 ====
1944 New South Wales state election: Kogarah
| Party | Candidate | Votes | % | ±% |
|---|---|---|---|---|
| Labor | William Currey | 13,532 | 60.7 | +11.9 |
| Democratic | Robert Henderson | 6,464 | 29.0 | −15.6 |
| Liberal Democratic | Thomas Claydon | 2,306 | 10.3 | +10.3 |
| Total formal votes | | 22,302 | 97.0 | −1.6 |
| Informal votes | | 683 | 3.0 | +1.6 |
| Turnout | | 22,985 | 93.0 | −1.5 |
| Labor hold | | Swing | N/A | |

- Preferences were not distributed.

==== 1941 ====
1941 New South Wales state election: Kogarah
| Party | Candidate | Votes | % | ±% |
|---|---|---|---|---|
| Labor | William Currey | 10,484 | 48.8 | |
| United Australia | James Ross | 9,581 | 44.6 | |
| State Labor | Paul Mortier | 1,400 | 6.5 | |
| Total formal votes | | 21,465 | 98.6 | |
| Informal votes | | 311 | 1.4 | |
| Turnout | | 311 | 1.4 | |
Two-party-preferred result
| Labor | William Currey | 11,741 | 54.7 | |
| United Australia | James Ross | 9,724 | 45.3 | |
| Labor gain from United Australia | | Swing | | |

=== Elections in the 1930s ===
==== 1938 ====
1938 New South Wales state election: Kogarah
| Party | Candidate | Votes | % | ±% |
|---|---|---|---|---|
| United Australia | James Ross | 11,633 | 53.2 | −0.4 |
| Labor | John Hibberd | 8,368 | 38.3 | −2.2 |
| Independent | John Battye | 1,863 | 8.5 | +8.5 |
| Total formal votes | | 21,864 | 98.3 | +0.1 |
| Informal votes | | 371 | 1.7 | −0.1 |
| Turnout | | 22,235 | 97.1 | −0.5 |
| United Australia hold | | Swing | N/A | |

- Preferences were not distributed.

==== 1935 ====
1935 New South Wales state election: Kogarah
| Party | Candidate | Votes | % | ±% |
|---|---|---|---|---|
| United Australia | James Ross | 10,799 | 53.6 | +4.0 |
| Labor (NSW) | Mark Gosling | 8,155 | 40.5 | −1.5 |
| Federal Labor | Patrick Quinane | 688 | 3.4 | −4.0 |
| Communist | Edward Bulmer | 508 | 2.5 | +1.6 |
| Total formal votes | | 20,150 | 98.2 | 0.0 |
| Informal votes | | 378 | 1.8 | 0.0 |
| Turnout | | 20,528 | 97.6 | −0.5 |
| United Australia hold | | Swing | N/A | |

- Preferences were not distributed.

==== 1932 ====
1932 New South Wales state election: Kogarah
| Party | Candidate | Votes | % | ±% |
|---|---|---|---|---|
| United Australia | James Ross | 9,664 | 49.6 | +15.4 |
| Labor (NSW) | Mark Gosling | 8,166 | 42.0 | −23.1 |
| Federal Labor | Robert Beaton | 1,444 | 7.4 | +7.4 |
| Communist | Arthur Smith | 165 | 0.9 | +0.1 |
| Independent | Philip Coyle | 27 | 0.1 | +0.1 |
| Total formal votes | | 19,466 | 98.2 | −0.3 |
| Informal votes | | 356 | 1.8 | +0.3 |
| Turnout | | 19,822 | 98.1 | +1.6 |
Two-party-preferred result
| United Australia | James Ross | 10,579 | 54.3 | |
| Labor (NSW) | Mark Gosling | 8,887 | 45.7 | |
| United Australia gain from Labor (NSW) | | Swing | N/A | |

==== 1930 ====
1930 New South Wales state election: Kogarah
| Party | Candidate | Votes | % | ±% |
|---|---|---|---|---|
| Labor | Mark Gosling | 12,090 | 65.1 | |
| Nationalist | Humphrey Earl | 6,351 | 34.2 | |
| Communist | Thomas Wright | 145 | 0.8 | |
| Total formal votes | | 18,586 | 98.5 | |
| Informal votes | | 283 | 1.5 | |
| Turnout | | 18,869 | 96.5 | |
| Labor win | | (new seat) | | |

Mark Gosling (Labor) was the sitting member for the abolished district of Oatley.
