= 1983 Kogarah state by-election =

Election result for Kogarah, New South Wales, Australia

A by-election was held for the New South Wales Legislative Assembly seat of Kogarah on 22 October 1983. It was triggered by the resignation of sitting Labor MP Bill Crabtree who had been dropped as Minister for Police and Minister for Services.

The Kogarah by-election was held the same day as the by-elections for Maroubra, Marrickville and Riverstone. All were safe Labor seats and while there was a swing against Labor in each seat (7.2% to 11.8%), all were retained by Labor.

== Dates ==
| Date | Event |
|---|---|
| 23 July 1983 | Bill Crabtree resigned. |
| 23 September 1983 | Writ of election issued by the Speaker of the Legislative Assembly and close of electoral rolls. |
| 30 September 1983 | Day of nomination |
| 22 October 1983 | Polling day |
| 11 November 1983 | Return of writ |

== Results ==
1983 Kogarah by-election Saturday 22 October
| Party | Candidate | Votes | % | ±% |
|---|---|---|---|---|
| Labor | Brian Langton | 12,263 | 51.2 | −11.8 |
| Liberal | Robert Young | 11,679 | 48.8 | +16.6 |
| Total formal votes | | 23,942 | 98.2 | |
| Informal votes | | 449 | 1.8 | |
| Turnout | | 24,391 | 76.7 | |
| Labor hold | | Swing | −15.0 (Note: compared to the two-party-preferred result for the 1981 Kogarah election.) | |

== See also ==
- Electoral results for the district of Kogarah
- List of New South Wales state by-elections
