= 1983 Maroubra state by-election =

Election result for Maroubra, New South Wales, Australia

A by-election was held for the New South Wales Legislative Assembly seat of Maroubra on 22 October 1983. It was triggered by the resignation of Bill Haigh (Labor) who had been dropped as Minister for Corrective Services in October 1981.

The Maroubra by-election was held the same day as the by-elections for Kogarah, Marrickville and Riverstone. All were safe Labor seats and while there was a swing against Labor in each seat (7.2% to 11.8%), all were retained by Labor.

== Dates ==
Date	Event
9 August 1983	Bill Haigh resigned.
23 September 1983	Writ of election issued by the Speaker of the Legislative Assembly and close of electoral rolls.
30 September 1983	Day of nomination
22 October 1983	Polling day
11 November 1983	Return of writ

== Result ==
1983 Maroubra state by-election
Party	Candidate	Votes	%	±%
Labor	Bob Carr	15,852	61.6	−7.2
Liberal	Phillp Abadee	9,868	38.4	+7.2
Total formal votes		25,720	97.5	+2.0
Informal votes		660	2.5	−2.0
Turnout		26,380	79.0	−11.9
Labor hold		Swing	−7.2	

== See also ==
- Electoral results for the district of Maroubra
- List of New South Wales state by-elections
