= Electoral results for the district of Maroubra =

Election results for Maroubra, New South Wales, Australia

Maroubra, an electoral district of the Legislative Assembly in the Australian state of New South Wales, has had one incarnation, from 1950 to the present.

== Members for Maroubra ==
Election	Member	Party
1950	Bob Heffron	Labor
1953	Bob Heffron	Labor
1956	Bob Heffron	Labor
1959	Bob Heffron	Labor
1962	Bob Heffron	Labor
1965	Bob Heffron	Labor
1968	Bill Haigh	Labor
1971	Bill Haigh	Labor
1973	Bill Haigh	Labor
1976	Bill Haigh	Labor
1978	Bill Haigh	Labor
1981	Bill Haigh	Labor
1983 by	Bob Carr	Labor
1984	Bob Carr	Labor
1988	Bob Carr	Labor
1991	Bob Carr	Labor
1995	Bob Carr	Labor
1999	Bob Carr	Labor
2003	Bob Carr	Labor
2005 by	Michael Daley	Labor
2007	Michael Daley	Labor
2011	Michael Daley	Labor
2015	Michael Daley	Labor
2019	Michael Daley	Labor
2023	Michael Daley	Labor

== Election results ==
=== Elections in the 2020s ===
==== 2023 ====
2023 New South Wales state election: Maroubra
Party	Candidate	Votes	%	±%
Labor	Michael Daley	27,076	54.4	+12.5
Liberal	Bill Burst	13,378	26.9	−5.1
Greens	Kym Chapple	5,835	11.7	+4.4
Informed Medical Options	Roderick Aguilar	1,554	3.1	+3.1
Animal Justice	Holly Williamson	1,096	2.2	+2.2
Sustainable Australia	Monique Isenheim	850	1.7	−0.2
Total formal votes		49,789	97.0	−0.2
Informal votes		1,516	3.0	+0.2
Turnout		51,305	86.3	−1.0
Two-party-preferred result
Labor	Michael Daley	31,677	68.7	+10.4
Liberal	Bill Burst	14,427	31.3	−10.4
Labor hold		Swing	+10.4	

=== Elections in the 2010s ===
==== 2019 ====
2019 New South Wales state election: Maroubra
Party	Candidate	Votes	%	±%
Labor	Michael Daley	20,243	41.93	−10.46
Liberal	Pat Farmer	15,329	31.75	−3.61
Independent	Noel D'Souza	6,492	13.45	+13.45
Greens	James Cruz	3,517	7.28	−1.55
Keep Sydney Open	Rowan Kos	1,242	2.57	+2.57
Sustainable Australia	Petra Campbell	923	1.91	+1.91
Conservatives	Caroline Simons	532	1.10	+1.10
Total formal votes		48,278	97.25	+0.13
Informal votes		1,364	2.75	−0.13
Turnout		49,642	88.38	−1.58
Two-party-preferred result
Labor	Michael Daley	24,026	58.46	−2.38
Liberal	Pat Farmer	17,069	41.54	+2.38
Labor hold		Swing	−2.38	

==== 2015 ====
2015 New South Wales state election: Maroubra
Party	Candidate	Votes	%	±%
Labor	Michael Daley	24,358	52.4	+7.3
Liberal	Brendan Roberts	16,440	35.4	−7.6
Greens	James Cruz	4,107	8.8	−0.9
No Land Tax	Georgia Constantinou	918	2.0	+2.0
Christian Democrats	Jacquie Shiha	672	1.4	−0.5
Total formal votes		46,495	97.1	+0.7
Informal votes		1,376	2.9	−0.7
Turnout		47,871	90.0	−0.4
Two-party-preferred result
Labor	Michael Daley	26,476	60.8	+8.6
Liberal	Brendan Roberts	17,041	39.2	−8.6
Labor hold		Swing	+8.6	

==== 2011 ====
2011 New South Wales state election: Maroubra
Party	Candidate	Votes	%	±%
Labor	Michael Daley	20,019	44.3	−8.5
Liberal	Michael Feneley	19,737	43.7	+16.0
Greens	Murray Matson	4,504	10.0	−1.9
Christian Democrats	Jacquie Shiha	884	2.0	+2.0
Total formal votes		45,144	97.1	+0.4
Informal votes		1,359	2.9	−0.4
Turnout		46,503	92.6	
Two-party-preferred result
Labor	Michael Daley	21,930	51.6	−14.6
Liberal	Michael Feneley	20,607	48.4	+14.6
Labor hold		Swing	−14.6	

=== Elections in the 2000s ===
==== 2007 ====
2007 New South Wales state election: Maroubra
Party	Candidate	Votes	%	±%
Labor	Michael Daley	22,078	52.9	−10.4
Liberal	Robert Belleli	11,581	27.7	+4.7
Greens	Anne Gardiner	4,972	11.9	+3.1
Independent	Derek Pitman	1,542	3.7	+3.7
Democrats	Kirsten Bennell	958	2.3	+1.0
Unity	Anthony Ayres	634	1.5	−0.5
Total formal votes		41,765	96.6	−0.7
Informal votes		1,452	3.4	+0.7
Turnout		43,217	92.5	
Two-party-preferred result
Labor	Michael Daley	24,183	66.1	−7.4
Liberal	Robert Belleli	12,386	33.9	+7.4
Labor hold		Swing	−7.4	

==== 2005 by-election ====
2005 Maroubra by-election Saturday 17 September
Party	Candidate	Votes	%	±%
Labor	Michael Daley	20,334	58.31	−5.83
Greens	Anne Gardiner	6,446	18.49	+10.09
Independent	Kerri Hamer	3,852	11.05	+11.05
Christian Democrats	Beth Smith	2,111	6.05	+6.05
Independent	Nick Stepkovitch	1,083	3.11	+3.11
Fishing Party	Victor Shen	1,044	2.99	+2.99
Total formal votes		34,870	95.41	+2.16
Informal votes		1,678	4.59	−2.16
Turnout		36,548	83.70	−6.79
Two-candidate-preferred result
Labor	Michael Daley	21,506	70.05	−3.43
Greens	Anne Gardiner	9,194	29.05	+29.05
Labor hold		Swing	N/A	

==== 2003 ====
2003 New South Wales state election: Maroubra
Party	Candidate	Votes	%	±%
Labor	Bob Carr	24,958	64.1	+4.8
Liberal	David Coleman	9,298	23.9	−0.2
Greens	Rik Jurcevic	3,270	8.4	+3.3
Unity	Chuan Ren	826	2.1	−0.4
Democrats	Kirsten Bennell	558	1.4	−1.9
Total formal votes		38,910	97.6	+0.5
Informal votes		968	2.4	−0.5
Turnout		39,878	90.5	
Two-party-preferred result
Labor	Bob Carr	26,979	73.5	+3.6
Liberal	David Coleman	9,739	26.5	−3.6
Labor hold		Swing	+3.0	

=== Elections in the 1990s ===
==== 1999 ====
1999 New South Wales state election: Maroubra
Party	Candidate	Votes	%	±%
Labor	Bob Carr	23,393	59.3	+2.2
Liberal	Tio Faulkner	9,523	24.1	−9.3
Greens	Jules Bastable	2,009	5.1	−1.3
One Nation	Jack McEwen	1,926	4.9	+4.9
Democrats	Paul Corben	1,292	3.3	+0.4
Unity	Nagaty Hassan	991	2.5	+2.5
AAFI	Cecilia Paton	312	0.8	+0.7
Total formal votes		39,446	97.1	+2.3
Informal votes		1,187	2.9	−2.3
Turnout		40,633	92.1	
Two-party-preferred result
Labor	Bob Carr	25,293	69.9	+6.3
Liberal	Tio Faulkner	10,867	30.1	−6.3
Labor hold		Swing	+6.3	

==== 1995 ====
1995 New South Wales state election: Maroubra
Party	Candidate	Votes	%	±%
Labor	Bob Carr	18,989	57.4	+0.1
Liberal	Shane Barber	11,030	33.3	−3.7
Greens	Rory Curphey	2,052	6.2	+6.2
Democrats	Andrew Larcos	1,015	3.1	−2.5
Total formal votes		33,086	94.9	+6.9
Informal votes		1,794	5.1	−6.9
Turnout		34,880	91.9	
Two-party-preferred result
Labor	Bob Carr	20,528	63.8	+3.0
Liberal	Shane Barber	11,646	36.2	−3.0
Labor hold		Swing	+3.0	

==== 1991 ====
1991 New South Wales state election: Maroubra
Party	Candidate	Votes	%	±%
Labor	Bob Carr	17,398	57.3	+3.9
Liberal	Vonnie O'Shea	11,244	37.1	+0.4
Democrats	Andrew Larcos	1,701	5.6	0.0
Total formal votes		30,343	87.9	−8.3
Informal votes		4,169	12.1	+8.3
Turnout		34,512	92.9	
Two-party-preferred result
Labor	Bob Carr	18,094	60.8	+1.4
Liberal	Vonnie O'Shea	11,678	39.2	−1.4
Labor hold		Swing	+1.4	

=== Elections in the 1980s ===
==== 1988 ====
1988 New South Wales state election: Maroubra
Party	Candidate	Votes	%	±%
Labor	Bob Carr	15,895	54.7	−8.1
Liberal	Phillip Abadee	10,498	36.1	−0.8
Democrats	Mathew Phillips	1,804	6.2	+6.0
Independent	Robert Tracey	866	3.0	+3.0
Total formal votes		29,063	96.3	−0.3
Informal votes		1,103	3.7	+0.3
Turnout		30,166	92.5	
Two-party-preferred result
Labor	Bob Carr	16,852	60.4	−2.6
Liberal	Phillip Abadee	11,055	39.6	+2.6
Labor hold		Swing	−2.6	

==== 1984 ====
1984 New South Wales state election: Maroubra
Party	Candidate	Votes	%	±%
Labor	Bob Carr	18,569	63.2	−5.6
Liberal	Phillip Abadee	10,804	36.8	+5.6
Total formal votes		29,373	96.6	+1.1
Informal votes		1,024	3.4	−1.1
Turnout		30,397	92.4	+1.5
Labor hold		Swing	−5.6	

==== 1983 by-election ====
1983 Maroubra state by-election
Party	Candidate	Votes	%	±%
Labor	Bob Carr	15,852	61.6	−7.2
Liberal	Phillp Abadee	9,868	38.4	+7.2
Total formal votes		25,720	97.5	+2.0
Informal votes		660	2.5	−2.0
Turnout		26,380	79.0	−11.9
Labor hold		Swing	−7.2	

Bill Haigh (Labor) resigned.

==== 1981 ====
1981 New South Wales state election: Maroubra
Party	Candidate	Votes	%	±%
Labor	Bill Haigh	19,619	68.8	−1.5
Liberal	Mervyn Colbron	8,910	31.2	+6.0
Total formal votes		28,529	95.5	
Informal votes		1,336	4.5	
Turnout		29,865	90.9	
Labor hold		Swing	−3.7	

=== Elections in the 1970s ===
==== 1978 ====
1978 New South Wales state election: Maroubra
Party	Candidate	Votes	%	±%
Labor	Bill Haigh	20,739	70.3	+8.2
Liberal	Kenneth Findlay	7,443	25.2	−10.0
Democrats	Ronald Brewer	1,318	4.5	+4.5
Total formal votes		29,500	97.2	−0.9
Informal votes		846	2.8	+0.9
Turnout		30,346	92.4	+0.3
Two-party-preferred result
Labor	Bill Haigh	21,398	72.5	+8.5
Liberal	Kenneth Findlay	8,102	27.5	−8.5
Labor hold		Swing	+8.5	

==== 1976 ====
1976 New South Wales state election: Maroubra
Party	Candidate	Votes	%	±%
Labor	Bill Haigh	18,703	62.1	+6.6
Liberal	Lindsay Rutherford	10,603	35.2	+0.5
Australia	Marie Morris	836	2.8	−3.4
Total formal votes		30,142	98.1	+1.1
Informal votes		571	1.9	−1.1
Turnout		30,713	92.1	+0.7
Two-party-preferred result
Labor	Bill Haigh	19,288	64.0	+4.1
Liberal	Lindsay Rutherford	10,854	36.0	−4.1
Labor hold		Swing	+4.1	

==== 1973 ====
1973 New South Wales state election: Maroubra
Party	Candidate	Votes	%	±%
Labor	Bill Haigh	15,427	55.5	−3.5
Liberal	Ronald Burkitt	9,633	34.7	+0.8
Australia	Norwood Hartley	1,709	6.2	+6.2
Democratic Labor	John Martin	1,025	3.7	−1.6
Total formal votes		27,794	97.0	
Informal votes		862	3.0	
Turnout		28,656	91.4	
Two-party-preferred result
Labor	Bill Haigh	16,649	59.9	−1.0
Liberal	Ronald Burkitt	11,145	40.1	+1.0
Labor hold		Swing	−1.0	

==== 1971 ====
1971 New South Wales state election: Maroubra
Party	Candidate	Votes	%	±%
Labor	Bill Haigh	15,307	59.0	+6.0
Liberal	Gregory Lyons	8,805	33.9	−13.1
Democratic Labor	Warwick Spooner	1,372	5.3	+5.3
Independent	Samuel Joseph	465	1.8	+1.8
Total formal votes		25,949	97.4	
Informal votes		694	2.6	
Turnout		26,643	93.2	
Two-party-preferred result
Labor	Bill Haigh	15,814	60.9	+7.9
Liberal	Gregory Lyons	10,135	39.1	−7.9
Labor hold		Swing	+7.9	

=== Elections in the 1960s ===
==== 1968 ====
1968 New South Wales state election: Maroubra
Party	Candidate	Votes	%	±%
Labor	Bill Haigh	13,014	53.0	−3.2
Liberal	Desmond Cahill	11,551	47.0	+10.9
Total formal votes		24,565	97.1	
Informal votes		734	2.9	
Turnout		25,299	94.0	
Labor hold		Swing	−8.0	

==== 1965 ====
1965 New South Wales state election: Maroubra
Party	Candidate	Votes	%	±%
Labor	Bob Heffron	12,369	56.2	−11.7
Liberal	Harold Heslehurst	7,932	36.1	+7.6
Independent	Thomas Bamborough	1,152	5.2	+5.2
Communist	Stanley Sharkey	540	2.5	+2.5
Total formal votes		21,993	97.8	−0.5
Informal votes		486	2.2	+0.5
Turnout		22,479	93.7	−0.9
Two-party-preferred result
Labor	Bob Heffron	13,416	61.0	−8.7
Liberal	Harold Heslehurst	8,577	39.0	+8.7
Labor hold		Swing	−8.7	

==== 1962 ====
1962 New South Wales state election: Maroubra
Party	Candidate	Votes	%	±%
Labor	Bob Heffron	14,493	67.9	+6.6
Liberal	Alexander Alexander	6,074	28.5	−6.8
Independent	Leslie Bond	775	3.6	+3.6
Total formal votes		21,342	98.3	
Informal votes		371	1.7	
Turnout		21,713	94.6	
Two-party-preferred result
Labor	Bob Heffron	14,881	69.7	+5.7
Liberal	Alexander Alexander	6,461	30.3	−5.7
Labor hold		Swing	+5.7	

=== Elections in the 1950s ===
==== 1959 ====
1959 New South Wales state election: Maroubra
Party	Candidate	Votes	%	±%
Labor	Bob Heffron	13,063	61.3	
Liberal	George Anthony	7,517	35.3	
Communist	Jim Baird	731	3.4	
Total formal votes		21,311	98.4	
Informal votes		343	1.6	
Turnout		21,654	95.5	
Two-party-preferred result
Labor	Bob Heffron	13,648	64.0	
Liberal	George Anthony	7,663	36.0	
Labor hold		Swing		

==== 1956 ====
1956 New South Wales state election: Maroubra
Party	Candidate	Votes	%	±%
Labor	Bob Heffron	14,820	64.9	−35.1
Liberal	Wallace Peacock	8,018	35.1	+35.1
Total formal votes		22,838	98.4	
Informal votes		376	1.6	
Turnout		23,214	93.9	
Labor hold		Swing	N/A	

==== 1953 ====
1953 New South Wales state election: Maroubra
Party	Candidate	Votes	%	±%
Labor	Bob Heffron	unopposed		
Labor hold				

==== 1950 ====
1950 New South Wales state election: Maroubra
Party	Candidate	Votes	%	±%
Labor	Bob Heffron	13,329	63.9	
Liberal	Philip Goldman	7,521	36.1	
Total formal votes		20,850	98.1	
Informal votes		394	1.9	
Turnout		21,244	92.5	
Labor notional hold				

Bob Heffron (Labor) was the member for the abolished district of Botany which was largely replaced by Maroubra.
