= 1948 Kogarah state by-election =

Election result for Kogarah, New South Wales, Australia

A by-election was held for the New South Wales Legislative Assembly seat of Kogarah on 17 July 1948. It was triggered by the death of William Currey (Labor).

== Dates ==
Date	Event
30 April 1948	William Currey died.
11 June 1948	Writ of election issued by the Speaker of the Legislative Assembly and close of electoral rolls.
22 June 1948	Day of nomination
17 July 1948	Polling day
6 August 1948	Return of writ

== Results ==
1948 Kogarah by-election Saturday 17 July
Party	Candidate	Votes	%	±%
Liberal	Douglas Cross	12,829	51.7	+9.1
Labor	Herbert Oxford	12,007	48.4	−9.1
Total formal votes		24,836	98.6	+0.1
Informal votes		361	1.4	−0.1
Turnout		25,197	90.8	−4.3
Liberal gain from Labor		Swing	+9.1	

== See also ==
- Electoral results for the district of Kogarah
- List of New South Wales state by-elections
