= 2005 Maroubra state by-election =

Election result for Maroubra, New South Wales, Australia

A by-election was staged in the New South Wales Legislative Assembly district of Maroubra on 17 September 2005. It was triggered by the resignation of sitting member and Premier Bob Carr (Labor). The by-election was timed to coincide with two other state by-elections in Macquarie Fields and Marrickville.

The by-election saw the Labor Party retain the seat with the election of candidate Michael Daley.

== Background ==
On 27 July 2005, New South Wales Premier Bob Carr announced his resignation as Premier. Carr had been leader of the New South Wales Labor Party since 1988. He led the party to government at the 1995 state election and his government was subsequently re-elected at the 1999 and 2003 elections. Carr's resignation took effect on 4 August 2005. At roughly 10 years 4 months, he served the longest continuous service of any Premier of New South Wales.

Carr also resigned his parliamentary seat, triggering the by-election.

== Results ==
Elections returns gave Labor candidate Michael Daley a comfortable victory. The opposition Liberal Party opted not to contest the seat.

2005 Maroubra by-election Saturday 17 September
Party	Candidate	Votes	%	±%
Labor	Michael Daley	20,334	58.31	−5.83
Greens	Anne Gardiner	6,446	18.49	+10.09
Independent	Kerri Hamer	3,852	11.05	+11.05
Christian Democrats	Beth Smith	2,111	6.05	+6.05
Independent	Nick Stepkovitch	1,083	3.11	+3.11
Fishing Party	Victor Shen	1,044	2.99	+2.99
Total formal votes		34,870	95.41	+2.16
Informal votes		1,678	4.59	−2.16
Turnout		36,548	83.70	−6.79
Two-candidate-preferred result
Labor	Michael Daley	21,506	70.05	−3.43
Greens	Anne Gardiner	9,194	29.05	+29.05
Labor hold		Swing	N/A	

== See also ==
- Electoral results for the district of Maroubra
- List of New South Wales state by-elections
