= Cherie Burton =

Australian politician

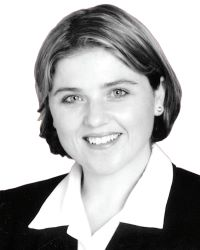

Member of the New South Wales Parliament for Kogarah
- In office 27 March 1999 – 6 March 2015
- Preceded by: Brian Langton
- Succeeded by: Chris Minns

Personal details
- Born: Cherie Ann Burton; 13 November 1968 (age 57) Paddington, New South Wales, Australia
- Party: Labor Party
- Spouse: Andrew Murphy
- Occupation: Union official; political advisor

Cherie Ann Burton (born 13 November 1968) is an Australian former politician, who was a Labor member of the New South Wales Legislative Assembly for Kogarah from 1999 to 2015.

== Early life ==
Burton was born in Paddington, New South Wales and brought up in Minto. She graduated from Narrabeen High School in 1986 and became an accounts clerk and an official for the National Union of Workers. She later became an adviser to Premier Bob Carr.

== Political career ==
Burton was first elected as the member for the relatively safe Labor seat of Kogarah in 1999, defeating the Liberal candidate, Sam Witheridge. At the time of her election, aged 30, she was one of the youngest Labor politicians on the back bench, second only to Matt Brown, aged 27.

Burton was the Minister for Housing and the Minister Assisting the Minister for Health (Mental Health) from August 2005 to March 2007. Citing family reasons, Burton announced she had decided to step down from the ministry following the 2007 NSW election.

== Outside politics ==
Burton is a keen sailor, having sailed since her teens. She is a Patron of the Kogarah Bay Sailing Club. In October 2006, she opened a new pontoon for Sailability Kogarah Bay at Dover Park, Blakehurst.

New South Wales Legislative Assembly
Preceded by Brian Langton	Member for Kogarah; 1999–2015	Succeeded by Chris Minns
