= James Ross (Australian politician) =

Australian politician

James Clyde Ross (31 July 1895 – 10 June 1975) was an Australian politician.

He was born at Marrickville in Sydney to glass manufacturer Frank Ross, and Edith Mary, née Price. He attended Arncliffe College and served in the 18th Battalion of the Australian Imperial Force during World War I, rising to the rank of major. On 13 May 1918 he married Gwendoline Ella Dew.

After the war he worked as a clothing manufacturer and commercial traveller, and was prominent in the All for Australia League. In 1932, he was elected to the New South Wales Legislative Assembly as the United Australia Party member for Kogarah, serving until his defeat in 1941. He was known as an opponent of Premier and party leader Bertram Stevens, and was one of those to vote against him in the successful no-confidence motion in 1939. Ross died in 1975 at Wentworthville.

New South Wales Legislative Assembly
Preceded by Mark Gosling	Member for Kogarah; 1932–1941	Succeeded by William Currey
