= Electoral district of Kogarah =

Electoral district of New South Wales, Australia

Kogarah New South Wales—Legislative Assembly
- Interactive map of district boundaries from the 2023 state election
- State: New South Wales
- Dates current: 1930–present
- MP: Chris Minns
- Party: Labor
- Namesake: Kogarah
- Electors: 53,226 (2019)
- Area: 18.13 km^{2} (7.0 sq mi)
- Demographic: Outer-metropolitan
Electorates around Kogarah:
| Bankstown | Canterbury | Rockdale |
| Oatley | Kogarah | Rockdale |
| Oatley | Miranda | Rockdale |

Kogarah is an electoral district of the Legislative Assembly in the Australian state of New South Wales. The electorate is located in St George. Since 2015 it has been represented by Chris Minns of the Labor Party, the state's premier since 2023.

== Geography ==
On its current boundaries, Kogarah takes in the suburbs of Allawah, Beverly Hills, Carlton, Carss Park, Kogarah and parts of Bexley, Bexley North, Blakehurst, Hurstville, Kingsgrove, Penshurst and South Hurstville.

== History ==
Kogarah was created for the 1930 election, partly replacing the abolished districts of Oatley and St George. It was a marginal seat in the 1930s and 1940s but, since 1953, it became increasingly safe for Labor.

The seat was first won by former state MP for St George and Oatley, Mark Gosling of the Labor Party. However, following factionalism, splits and sectarianism within the state and federal Labor parties, the United Australia Party, later the Liberal Party, won the seat at the 1932 election. Winning back the seat in 1941, the Labor Party have since held the seat for seventy-eight of the seats ninety-three years of its existence.

Kogarah has one of the biggest Chinese-Australian communities in Australia, with around 29,000 of the electorate's residents having a Chinese background.

== Members for Kogarah ==
| Member | Party | Term |
|---|---|---|
| Mark Gosling | Labor | 1930–1932 |
| James Ross | United Australia | 1932–1941 |
| William Currey | Labor | 1941–1948 |
| Douglas Cross | Liberal | 1948–1953 |
| Bill Crabtree | Labor | 1953–1983 |
| Brian Langton | Labor | 1983–1999 |
| Cherie Burton | Labor | 1999–2015 |
| Chris Minns | Labor | 2015–present |

== Election results ==
2023 New South Wales state election: Kogarah
| Party | Candidate | Votes | % | ±% |
|---|---|---|---|---|
| Labor | Chris Minns | 30,916 | 60.6 | +19.7 |
| Liberal | Craig Chung | 14,380 | 28.2 | −15.4 |
| Greens | Tracy Yuen | 3,511 | 6.9 | +0.5 |
| Independent | Troy Stolz | 2,186 | 4.3 | +4.3 |
| Total formal votes | | 50,993 | 96.0 | +0.3 |
| Informal votes | | 2,145 | 4.0 | −0.3 |
| Turnout | | 53,138 | 89.2 | +0.4 |
Two-party-preferred result
| Labor | Chris Minns | 33,393 | 68.3 | +18.1 |
| Liberal | Craig Chung | 15,523 | 31.7 | −18.1 |
| Labor hold | | Swing | +18.1 | |
