= Mark Gosling =

English Australian politician

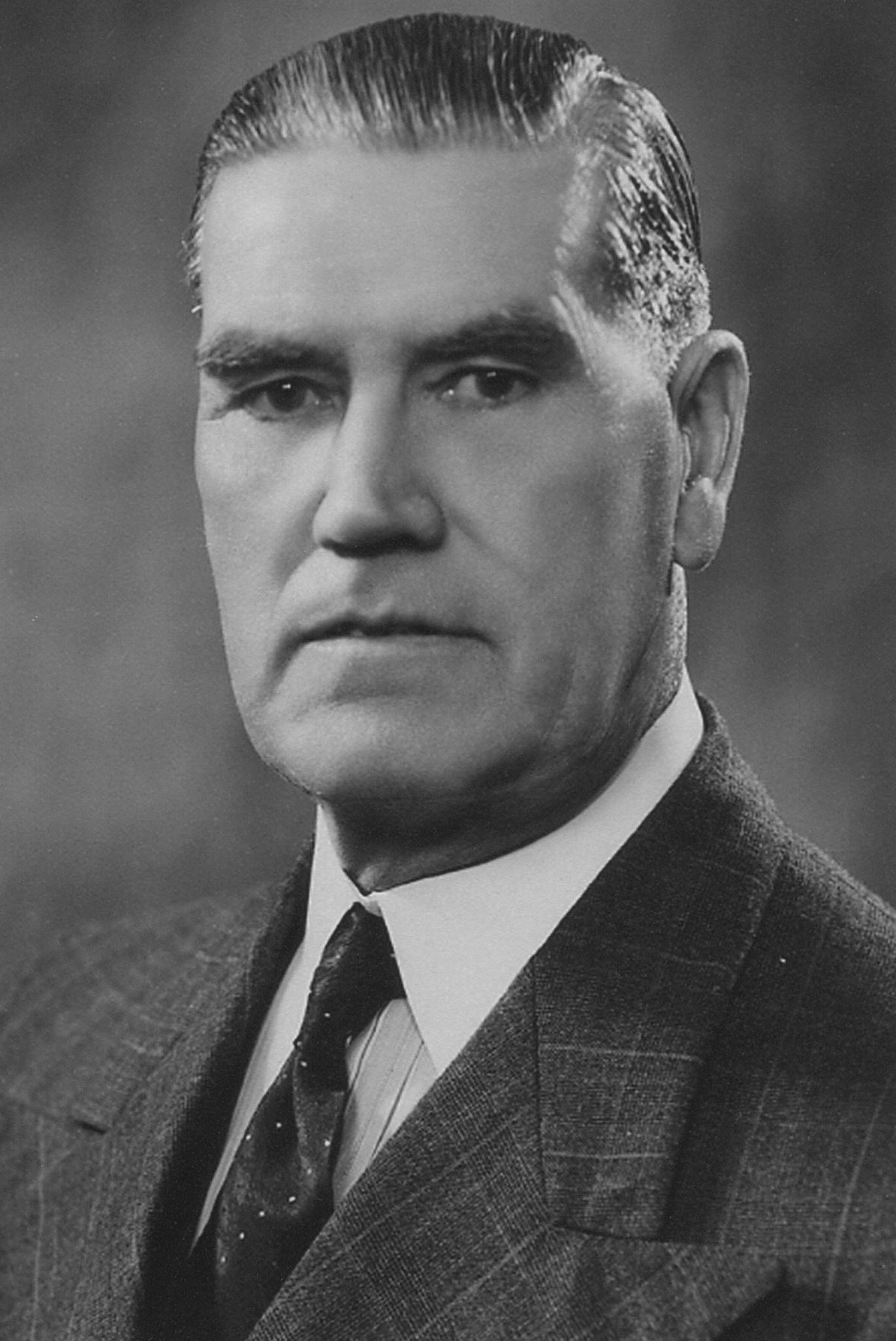
- Born: 7 August 1886
- Died: 3 May 1980 (aged 93)
- Occupation: Painter

Mark Gosling (7 August 1886 – 3 May 1980) was an English Australian painter, building contractor and Labor member of the New South Wales Legislative Assembly for the districts of St George (1920–1927), Oatley (1927–1930) and Kogarah (1930–1932). He served as Colonial Secretary of New South Wales from May to October 1927 and again from November 1930 to May 1932.

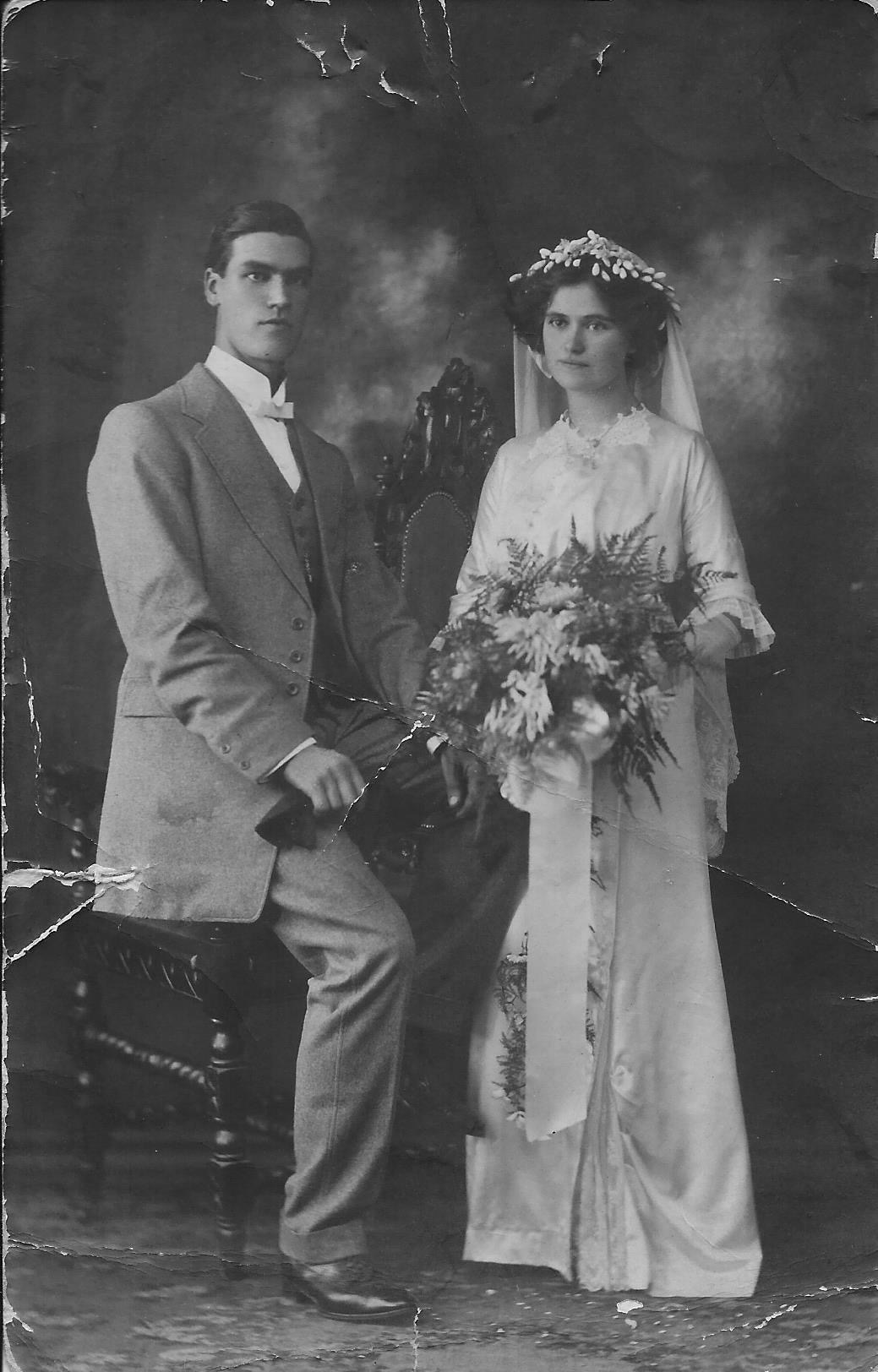
Mark and Florence Gosling

== Biography ==
The son of labourer Samuel Gosling and Hannah Nelms, Mark Gosling was born on 7 August 1886 in Birmingham, England. In 1913 he married Florence Thorneycroft, daughter of William Joseph Thorneycroft and Esther Morgan of Warwickshire and Staffordshire, England, and they had three sons, Ronald, Derek and Robert.

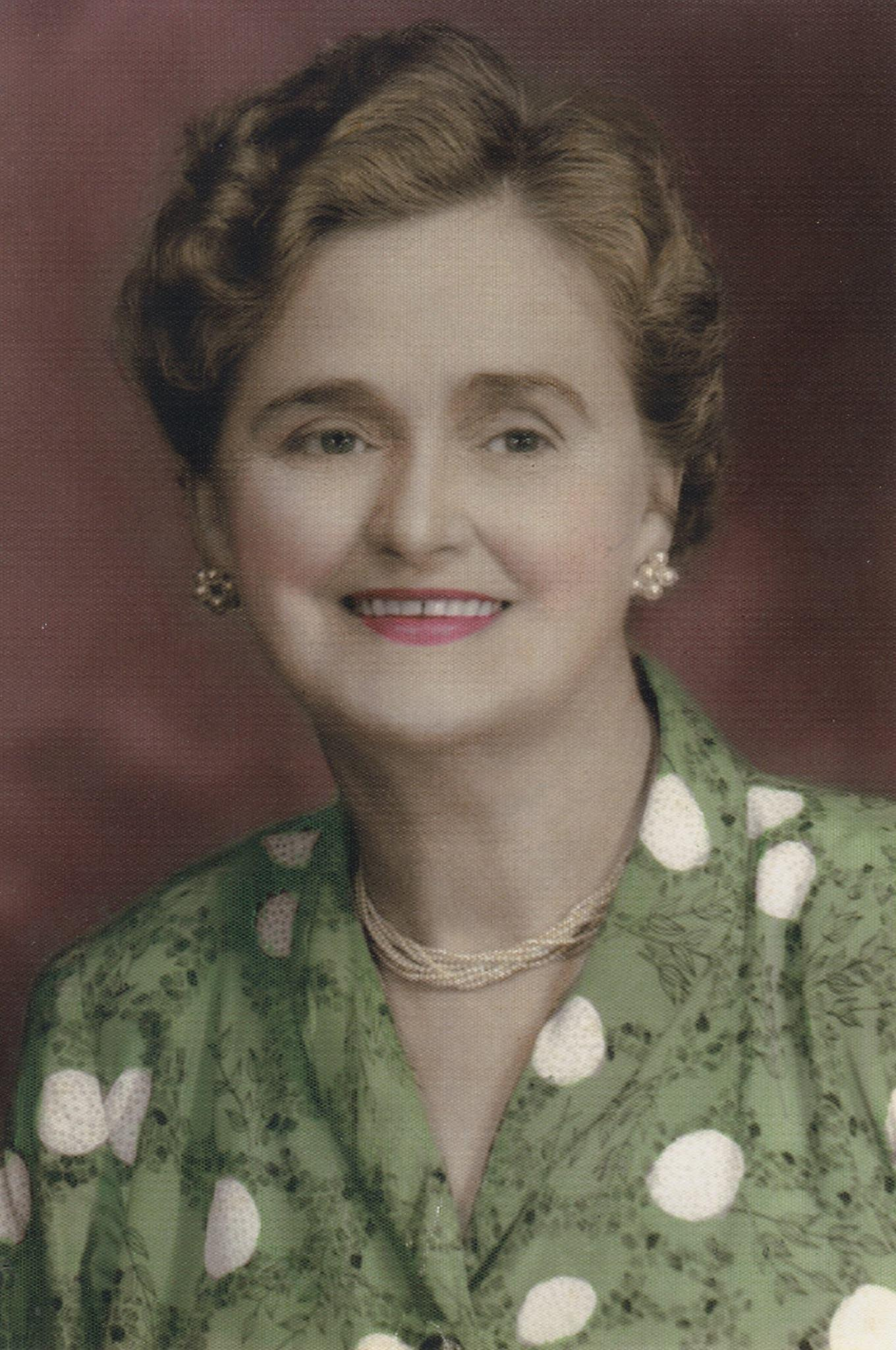
Florence Thorneycroft

He received only a primary education, but would later attend tutorials at the University of Sydney from 1916 to 1919. He became a building contractor and painter, joining the Painters' Union and serving as its vice president from 1915 to 1918. Later, he directed St George Hospital from 1920 to 1927. From 1925 to 1957, Gosling was a National Park trustee. He died in his sleep in Bexley, New South Wales on 3 May 1980 as one of the last surviving members of Jack Lang's 1930 ministry.

== Politics ==
In 1920, Gosling was elected as one of five Assembly members from the district of St George, though he won only five per cent of the vote. He was re-elected in 1922 and 1925, taking 16 and then 18 per cent of the vote. In 1927, the district of St George was divided into single member districts, with Gosling winning the new district of Oatley by a margin of 3.2 per cent over James Webb. In 1930, Oatley itself was abolished and replaced with the district of Kogarah, which Gosling won again over Humphrey Earl, but lost to James Ross in 1932. Mark Gosling was active in the Australian Labor Party throughout his career, serving as president of the party's Petersham and Homedale leagues and of the Barton federal electorate council. In 1915 and 1916, he was the president of the district and Petersham campaigns against conscription, and he was a member of the party's executive from 1938 to 1939.

New South Wales Legislative Assembly
Preceded by William Bagnall	Member for St George; 1920–1927	Succeeded by Joseph Cahill
Preceded by New seat	Member for Oatley; 1927–1930	Succeeded by Abolished
Preceded by New seat	Member for Kogarah; 1930–1932	Succeeded by James Ross
