= Electoral district of Maroubra =

Maroubra New South Wales—Legislative Assembly
- Interactive map of district boundaries from the 2023 state election
- State: New South Wales
- Dates current: 1950–present
- MP: Michael Daley
- Party: Labor Party
- Namesake: Maroubra
- Electors: 59,449 (2023)
- Area: 46.33 km^{2} (17.9 sq mi)
- Demographic: Inner-metropolitan
Electorates around Maroubra:
Heffron	Heffron	Coogee
Heffron	Maroubra	Pacific Ocean
Cronulla	Cronulla	Pacific Ocean

Maroubra is an electoral district of the Legislative Assembly in the Australian state of New South Wales located south-east of Sydney CBD. It is currently represented by Michael Daley, former leader of the Labor Party.

== Geography ==
On its current boundaries, Maroubra takes in the suburbs of Banksmeadow, Botany, Chifley, Daceyville, Eastgardens, Hillsdale, Kingsford, La Perouse, Little Bay, Malabar, Maroubra, Maroubra Junction, Matraville, Pagewood, Phillip Bay, Port Botany and parts of Eastlakes.

== History ==
Maroubra is one of four current electorates in the New South Wales Legislative Assembly to have been held by two Premiers of New South Wales while in office. Both Premiers Bob Heffron and Bob Carr have held Maroubra while in office.

Maroubra has always been a safe seat for the Labor Party. It has had one of the fewest turnover of members of current seats in the New South Wales Legislative Assembly, with just four members in over 60 years - equal with the electorates of Lake Macquarie and Wagga Wagga.

== Members for Maroubra ==
Member	Party	Term
Bob Heffron	Labor	1950–1968
Bill Haigh	Labor	1968–1983
Bob Carr	Labor	1983–2005
Michael Daley	Labor	2005–present

== Election results ==
2023 New South Wales state election: Maroubra
Party	Candidate	Votes	%	±%
Labor	Michael Daley	27,076	54.4	+12.5
Liberal	Bill Burst	13,378	26.9	−5.1
Greens	Kym Chapple	5,835	11.7	+4.4
Informed Medical Options	Roderick Aguilar	1,554	3.1	+3.1
Animal Justice	Holly Williamson	1,096	2.2	+2.2
Sustainable Australia	Monique Isenheim	850	1.7	−0.2
Total formal votes		49,789	97.0	−0.2
Informal votes		1,516	3.0	+0.2
Turnout		51,305	86.3	−1.0
Two-party-preferred result
Labor	Michael Daley	31,677	68.7	+10.4
Liberal	Bill Burst	14,427	31.3	−10.4
Labor hold		Swing	+10.4	
