= Bill Haigh =

Australian politician (1924–2017)

William Henry Haigh (28 May 1924 – 15 November 2017) was an Australian politician. He was the Labor member for Maroubra in the New South Wales Legislative Assembly from 1968 to 1983. He served as minister assisting the premier from 1976 until 1978, as minister for services from 1977 to 1978, and as minister for corrective services from 1978 to 1981.

Haigh was born in Liverpool, England, to boot repairer Christopher Haigh and Catherine Runcie Deegan. His family migrated to Australia and he was educated at Malabar and Randwick. He was then apprenticed as a fitter and turner, and joined the Amalgamated Engineering Union aged 16. He married Edith Frances Jones on 9 June 1945, with whom he had four children. Haigh worked at Bunnerong Power Station from 1949 until 1959, and joined the Labor Party in 1949. He was elected to Randwick Municipal Council in 1956, serving until 1968 (as Mayor from 1962).

In 1968, following the retirement of former premier Bob Heffron, Haigh was selected as the Labor candidate for Heffron's seat of Maroubra. His first win was a narrow one, but at subsequent elections he was untroubled. In 1976 he was appointed to the ministry as minister assisting the premier; the Services portfolio was added in 1977. In 1978 he became Minister for Corrective Services. Dropped from the ministry after the 1981 state election, he resigned from parliament in 1983; the by-election for his seat was won by future Premier Bob Carr.

He is the only member for Maroubra who did not serve as leader of the NSW ALP.

Haigh died age 93 on 15 November 2017 and his term as Mayor of Randwick remains the longest continuous term.

Civic offices
Preceded by A. Charles Molloy	Mayor of Randwick; 1962 – 1968	Succeeded by Peter Saphin
New South Wales Legislative Assembly
Preceded by Bob Heffron	Member for Maroubra; 1968 – 1983	Succeeded by Bob Carr
Political offices
Preceded by Ron Mulock	Minister for Services; 1977 – 1978	Succeeded by Bill Crabtree
Preceded by Ron Mulock as Minister for Justice	Minister for Corrective Services; 1978 – 1981	Succeeded by Rex Jackson
