= Brian Langton =

Australian politician (1948–2023)

Minister for Transport
- In office 4 April 1995 – 1 Dececmber 1997
- Premier: Bob Carr
- Preceded by: Bruce Baird
- Succeeded by: Carl Scully

Minister for Tourism
- In office 4 April 1995 – 1 December 1997
- Premier: Bob Carr
- Preceded by: Virginia Chadwick
- Succeeded by: Bob Debus

Minister for Fair Trading
- In office 1 December 1997 – 30 April 1998
- Premier: Bob Carr
- Preceded by: Faye Lo Po'
- Succeeded by: Jeff Shaw

Minister for Emergency Services
- In office 1 December 1997 – 30 April 1998
- Premier: Bob Carr
- Preceded by: Bob Debus
- Succeeded by: Bob Debus

Member of the New South Wales Legislative Assembly for Kogarah
- In office 22 October 1983 – 5 March 1999
- Preceded by: Bill Crabtree
- Succeeded by: Cherie Burton

Mayor of Kogarah
- In office 1979–1980

Alderman of Kogarah
- In office 1971–1983

Personal details
- Born: 24 January 1948 Maroubra, New South Wales
- Died: 17 October 2023 (aged 75)
- Party: Labor
- Spouse: Elizabeth Michalak (m. 1976)

Brian Joseph Langton (24 January 1948 – 17 October 2023) was an Australian Labor Party politician, who served both as mayor of Kogarah in the St George area of Sydney and as the member for Kogarah in the New South Wales Legislative Assembly. In 1998 Langton was found by the Independent Commission Against Corruption (ICAC) to have been involved in corruption, having deceptively lodged travel allowances.

== Early years ==
Brian Joseph Langton was born in the Sydney suburb of Maroubra on 24 January 1948. Prior to Parliament, he went to school at Marist Brothers, Kogarah and was an investment banker and manager of a travel company. He showed an early interest in politics, being elected to Kogarah Council in 1971 at the age of just 23. He served on the council for twelve years and was elected mayor in 1979 and 1980.

== Political career ==
In 1983, Langton was elected to the New South Wales Parliament as a Labor Party member for Kogarah and served continuously in that role for sixteen years. When Labor formed a government in 1995, Brian Langton was appointed a minister, looking after the portfolios of Transport and Tourism from April 1995 to December 1997 and then Fair Trading and Emergency Services in December 1997.

In April 1998, Langton relinquished his ministerial duties due to his involvement in a political scandal, after the Independent Commission Against Corruption (ICAC) found him guilty of corruptly rorting charter plane expenses. The ICAC deemed that Langton had sought advantage for himself by deliberate deception of the Parliamentary Accounts Department. Langton stepped down at the 1999 state election, and left politics with a $90,000 indexed entitlement.

In May 2008, the New South Wales Transport Minister, John Watkins, appointed Langton to the position of Chairman of Sydney Ferries.

== Personal life and death ==
Langton was married with three daughters.

In 1996, Langton was the patron of the St George Australian Football Club.

Brian Langton died on 17 October 2023. He was 75.

New South Wales Legislative Assembly
Preceded by Bill Crabtree	Member for Kogarah; 1983–1999	Succeeded by Cherie Burton
