= Douglas Cross =

Australian politician

Personal details
- Born: 8 September 1892 Marrackville, Sydney
- Died: 9 July 1970 (aged 77) Sydney
- Party: Liberal Party

Douglas Donald Cross (8 September 1892 – 9 July 1970) was an Australian politician. He was a member of the New South Wales Legislative Assembly from 1948 until 1953 and from 1956 until his death . He was a member of the Liberal Party.

== Biography ==
Cross was born in Marrickville, New South Wales. He was the son of a police constable and educated to elementary level at a state superior school. Cross initially worked as a carpenter but eventually owned a large building company. He served in the First Australian Imperial Force in France between 1916 and 1919. Cross was an alderman on the council of the Municipality of Kogarah between 1942 and 1970 and was mayor in 1944–47 and 1953–58. In 1948, he was elected to the New South Wales Parliament as the Liberal member for Kogarah at the by-election caused by the death of Labor's sitting member William Currey. He retained the seat until he was defeated by Labor's Bill Crabtree at the 1953 state election. At the following election in 1956 he defeated Frank O'Neill, Labor's sitting member for the seat of Georges River. He retained this seat until his death in 1970.

New South Wales Legislative Assembly
Preceded by William Currey	Member for Kogarah; 1948–1953	Succeeded by Bill Crabtree
Preceded by Frank O'Neill	Member for Georges River; 1956–1970	Succeeded by Frank Walker
