= William Currey =

Australian Victoria Cross recipient

William Currey VC
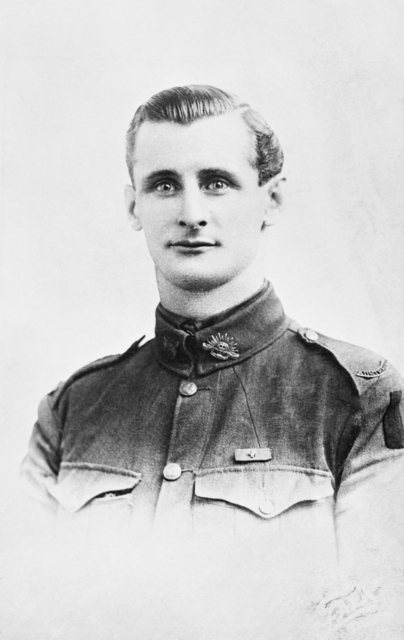
- Currey c. 1918

Member of the New South Wales Legislative Assembly for Kogarah
- In office 10 May 1941 – 30 April 1948
- Preceded by: James Ross
- Succeeded by: Douglas Cross

Personal details
- Born: 19 September 1895 Wallsend, New South Wales
- Died: 30 April 1948 (aged 52) Bexley, New South Wales
- Party: Labor Party

Military service
- Allegiance: Australia
- Branch/service: Australian Army
- Years of service: 1916–1919; 1930–1932; 1940–1941
- Rank: Warrant Officer
- Unit: 53rd Battalion
- Battles/wars: First World War; Second World War
- Awards: Victoria Cross

William Matthew Currey, VC (19 September 1895 – 30 April 1948) was an Australian politician and an Australian recipient of the Victoria Cross, the highest award for gallantry in the face of the enemy that can be awarded to British and Commonwealth forces. He received the award for his actions during the Battle of Mont Saint-Quentin in September 1918, while serving with Australian Imperial Force on the Western Front during the First World War.

After the war, Currey worked as a labourer and railway worker before entering the New South Wales Legislative Assembly as the Labor Party representative for the seat of Kogarah, which he held between 1941 and his death in 1948.

== Early life ==
Born in Wallsend, New South Wales, on 19 September 1895, Currey was the son of a miner, William Robert Currey and Mary Ellen Lang. After attending Dudley and Plattsburg public schools, he was employed as a wireworker in Leichhardt. In October 1916, he enlisted in the Australian Imperial Force, volunteering for service overseas during the First World War, having attempted unsuccessfully several times before, being rejected as under-aged. After being accepted, Currey was eventually sent to the Western Front in Europe, where he initially served the 4th Light Trench Mortar Battery, before being posted in July 1917 to the 53rd Battalion – an infantry battalion that had been recruited primarily from New South Wales – as a reinforcement. In late 1917, Currey fought with the battalion during the Battle of Polygon Wood.

== Victoria Cross ==
In September 1918, during the final Allied offensive of the war – the Hundred Days Offensive – Currey was one of eight Australians awarded the Victoria Cross for their actions during the Battle of Mont Saint-Quentin.

On 1 September 1918 in the attack on Péronne, France, Currey, as a 22-year-old private in the 53rd Battalion, rushed forward under heavy machine-gun fire and captured single-handed a 77-mm field gun which had been holding up the advance, killing all the crew. Later, when the advance was checked by an enemy strong-point he crept round the flank and engaged the post with a Lewis gun, then rushed it, causing many casualties. Subsequently, he volunteered to carry orders for withdrawal to an isolated company, bringing back valuable information, doing so under heavy fire and despite being gassed. The citation published in the London Gazette of 14 December 1918 concluded that his behaviour was a "striking example of coolness, determination and utter disregard of danger... and his gallant work contributed largely to the success of the operation."

The Australian official war historian, Charles Bean, described the final act of Currey's heroism thusly: "At 3 am when efforts to reach (a Lt Waite in an advanced position) having failed Private Currey volunteered to make his third attempt and going out far into the disputed front he stood up and called with all his lung power. "Waitsy! Get in." The Germans turned on him every weapon they had; he was gassed and his respirator was shot through. But Waite had heard him and returned."

== Later life ==
Currey was discharged from the AIF in 1919, and took up employment as a storeman, working for the Railways Department in New South Wales, remaining in the role until 1941. On 10 April 1920, he married Emmie Davies at St Saviour's Anglican Church, in Punchbowl, and the couple later had two daughters together. Currey briefly returned to the military twice: in 1930–32 he served in the Militia in the 45th Battalion, and then during the Second World War he served in the Australian Instructional Corps as a sergeant in a training role between 1940 and 1941 before being discharged.

In 1941, he ceased working for the Railways, and successfully stood for election as the Labor Party member for Kogarah in the New South Wales Legislative Assembly. He was the only Victoria Cross recipient to sit in the New South Wales parliament and was re-elected twice: in 1944 and 1947. In late April 1948, while in parliament, he collapsed and three days later, on 30 April 1948, he died at Bexley, New South Wales, from coronary-vascular disease. His funeral was held at St Stephen's Presbyterian church in Macquarie Street, Sydney, following which he was cremated.

== Remembrances ==
Currey's Victoria Cross is displayed at the Australian War Memorial in Canberra, Australia. Following a public appeal in 1956 a plaque was erected in memory of Currey in the Speakers Square within the New South Wales Parliament complex. During renovations in the 1970s the plaque was put into storage for safekeeping and was only rediscovered and restored to its place in 2008.

In 1976, the Jeffries and Currey Memorial Library was opened by the Governor of New South Wales, Sir Roden Cutler, at Dudley Public School to honour two of the school's pupils who were decorated with the Victoria Cross during the First World War: Clarence Jeffries and William Currey. The pair are also commemorated by the Capt. Clarence Smith Jeffries (V.C.) and Pte. William Matthew Currey (V.C.) Memorial Wall located in the grounds of Sandgate General Cemetery, Newcastle, which was unveiled in an official ceremony on 16 April 2000.

New South Wales Legislative Assembly
| Preceded by James Ross | Member for Kogarah; 1941–1948 | Succeeded by Douglas Cross |
