= Bill Crabtree =

Australian politician

William Frederick Farrar Crabtree (31 May 1915 – 12 July 2001) was an Australian politician. He was a member of the New South Wales Legislative Assembly from 1953 until 1983 and represented the Labor Party.

Born in the Sydney suburb of Marrickville, Crabtree was the son of an engineer, and was educated to intermediate level at Kogarah High School. He joined the ALP in 1931 and worked as a public servant initially for the New South Wales Government Railways. Later he served as an office-holder in the Australian Railways Union and the private secretary to Clive Evatt from 1947 until his entry into parliament.

Crabtree defeated Douglas Cross the incumbent member for the seat of Kogarah, at the 1953 election. He retained the seat for the Labor Party at the next 10 elections.

In the government of Neville Wran he was Minister for Lands and Minister for Environment between 1976 and 1980 and Minister for Police and Minister for Services from 1980 to 1981.

New South Wales Legislative Assembly
Preceded by Douglas Cross	Member for Kogarah; 1953 – 1983	Succeeded by Brian Langton
Political offices
Preceded by Col Fisher	Minister for Lands; 1976–1980	Succeeded by Lin Gordon
Preceded by Sir John Fuller as Minister for Planning & Environment	Minister for Environment; 1976–1980	Succeeded by Paul Landa as Minister for Planning & Environment
Preceded by John Waddy	Minister for Police; Minister for Services; 1980–1981	Succeeded by Peter Anderson as Minister for Police & Emergency Services
