= Bob Carr =

Australian politician (born 1947)

The Honourable Bob Carr
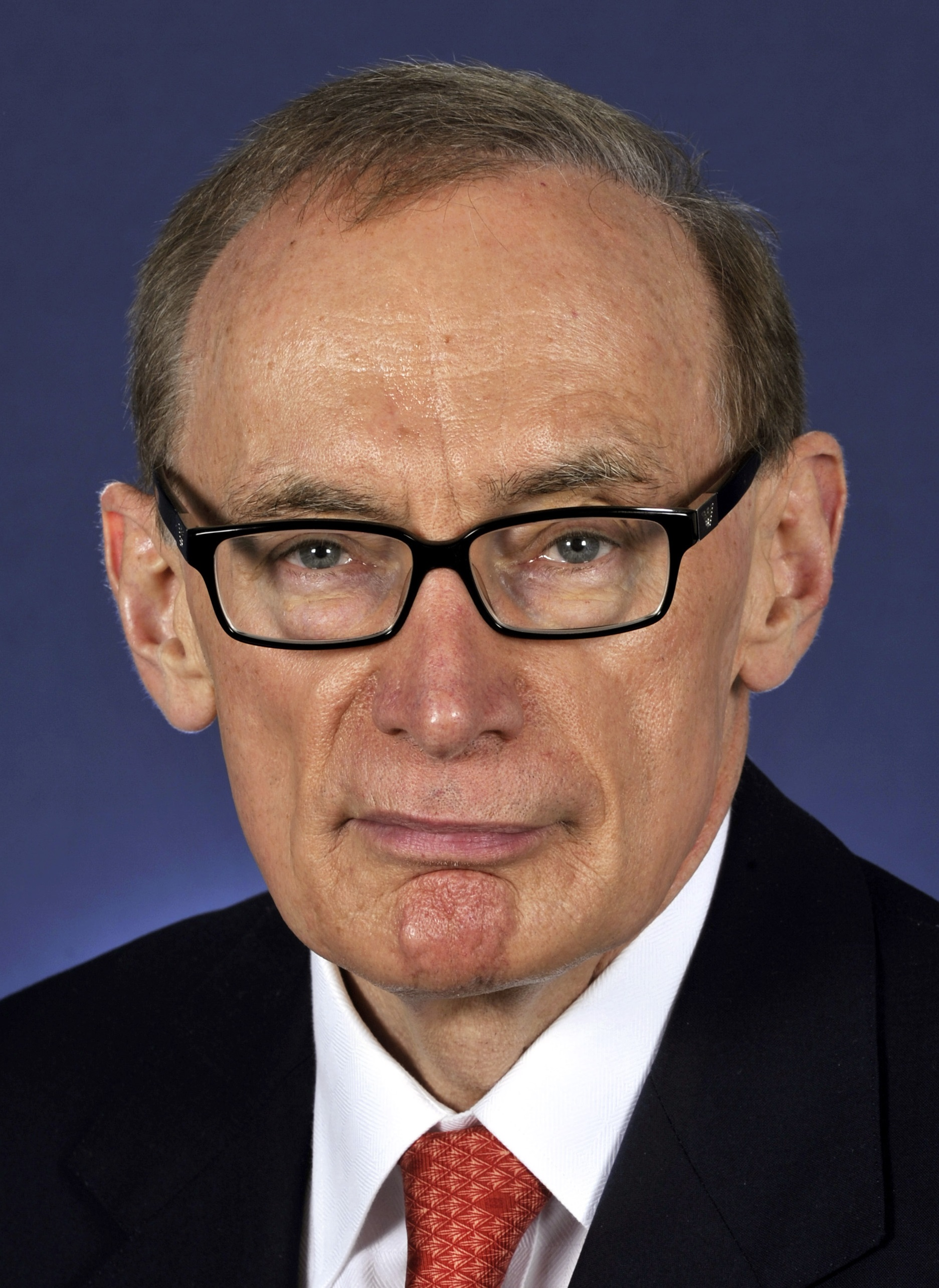
- Official portrait, 2012

39th Premier of New South Wales
- In office 4 April 1995 – 3 August 2005
- Monarch: Elizabeth II
- Governor: Peter Sinclair; Gordon Samuels; Marie Bashir
- Deputy: Andrew Refshauge
- Preceded by: John Fahey
- Succeeded by: Morris Iemma

Minister for Foreign Affairs
- In office 13 March 2012 – 18 September 2013
- Prime Minister: Julia Gillard; Kevin Rudd
- Preceded by: Kevin Rudd
- Succeeded by: Julie Bishop

Senator for New South Wales
- In office 6 March 2012 – 24 October 2013
- Preceded by: Mark Arbib
- Succeeded by: Deborah O'Neill
State positions 1983 – 2005
Minister for the Arts and Ethnic Affairs (Note: Minister for Ethnic Affairs from 4 April 1995 to 8 April 1999 and then Minister for Citizenship from 8 April 1999 to 3 August 2005.)
In office 4 April 1995 – 3 August 2005
Premier	Himself
Preceded by	Peter Collins (Arts); Michael Photios (Ethnic Affairs)
Succeeded by	Bob Debus (Arts); Morris Iemma (Ethnic Affairs)
Leader of the Opposition in New South Wales
In office 11 April 1988 – 4 April 1995
Premier	Nick Greiner; John Fahey
Deputy	Andrew Refshauge
Preceded by	Nick Greiner
Succeeded by	Peter Collins
Minister for Planning and Environment
In office 12 December 1984 – 21 March 1988
Premier	Neville Wran; Barrie Unsworth
Preceded by	Terry Sheahan
Succeeded by	David Hay
Minister for Heritage
In office 4 July 1986 – 21 March 1988
Premier	Barrie Unsworth
Preceded by	Office established
Succeeded by	Vacant (Position next held by Robyn Parker)
Minister for Consumer Affairs
In office 6 February – 4 July 1986
Premier	Neville Wran
Preceded by	George Paciullo
Succeeded by	Deirdre Grusovin
Member of the New South Wales Parliament for Maroubra
In office 22 October 1983 – 3 August 2005
Preceded by	Bill Haigh
Succeeded by	Michael Daley

Personal details
- Born: Robert John Carr; 28 September 1947 (age 79) Matraville, New South Wales, Australia
- Party: Labor
- Spouse: Helena John (m. 1973; died 2023)
- Education: University of New South Wales (BA)

Robert John Carr (born 28 September 1947) is an Australian retired politician and journalist who served as the 39th premier of New South Wales from 1995 to 2005, as the leader of the New South Wales branch of the Australian Labor Party. He later entered federal politics as a New South Wales senator, and served as Minister for Foreign Affairs from 2012 to 2013. Following his departure from politics, he served as the director of the Australia-China Relations Institute (ACRI) from 2014 to 2019 at the University of Technology Sydney (UTS).

Carr was born in Sydney and attended the University of New South Wales. Before entering politics he worked as a journalist. Carr entered the New South Wales Legislative Assembly in 1983, and the following year became a cabinet minister. He served under Neville Wran and Barrie Unsworth until the Labor government was defeated in a landslide at the 1988 state election. Carr subsequently replaced Unsworth as party leader, thus becoming Leader of the Opposition. He led Labor to the 1991 election, where it recovered many of the seats it had lost in 1988, and then became premier after a narrow victory in 1995.

As Premier, Carr was known for his emphasis on conservation and his use of public–private partnerships to fund infrastructure projects. His government oversaw much of the planning for the 2000 Summer Olympics, which Sydney hosted. However, he was criticised for allowing poker machines to become widespread in pubs across the state, which led to an increase in gambling addiction. Carr was re-elected twice, in 1999 and 2003, eventually resigning as Premier in 2005 after 10 years in office. Only Henry Parkes served as Premier for longer, and no one has served a longer consecutive term. Carr remained a public figure after leaving the Premiership, and entered federal politics in 2012 at the urging of Prime Minister Julia Gillard. He served as Foreign Minister under both Gillard and Kevin Rudd, but retired following Labor's defeat at the 2013 federal election. As of 2026, Carr is the latest Premier of New South Wales to have served a full term.

== Early life and career ==
Carr was born in the Sydney suburb of Matraville to Edward and Phyllis Carr. He was educated at Matraville High School from which he graduated as dux in 1964. He was the first person in his family to finish high school, and became interested in a career in politics in his teenage years.

While still a 15-year-old student at school, Carr joined the Maroubra branch of the Australian Labor Party. He would go on to become the President of the Maroubra branch and then the national President of Young Labor in 1970 and 1972 respectively. He completed his tertiary education at the University of New South Wales, from which he graduated with a Bachelor of Arts with Honours in History.

After graduation, Carr worked as a journalist for the ABC Radio's AM and PM current affair programs from 1969 to 1971. He was also a reporter on industrial relations and politics for The Bulletin magazine from 1978 to 1983. He later recalled that his work as a journalist provided good preparation for his political career. He also spent a period working as an education officer for the Labor Council of New South Wales (1972–78).

In 1972, Carr met a Malaysian economics student, Helena John on a holiday in Tahiti, and they married on 24 February 1973. Helena Carr became a successful businesswoman, while she largely remained out of the political spotlight during her husband's career. Helena Carr died on 25 October 2023.

== New South Wales state politics (1983–2005) ==
Carr entered the New South Wales Legislative Assembly at a by-election in October 1983 as the member for Maroubra, representing the Australian Labor Party. In December 1984 he was appointed Minister for Planning and Environment in the Neville Wran government. In February 1986, he also took on the Consumer Affairs portfolio, which he held until he became Minister for Heritage in July 1986 when Barrie Unsworth became premier. As planning minister, Carr released a new metropolitan planning strategy for the capital, to replace the 1968 Sydney Region Outline Plan.

=== Leader of the opposition (1988–1995) ===
The Unsworth Labor government was defeated in March 1988, in the context of a 'time for a change' sentiment after 12 years of Labor. Carr was interested in international relations, and his long-term ambition was to enter federal politics and become Minister for Foreign Affairs.

However, following the election Carr was pressured by his own right–wing faction to stand for the leadership. Further, the party organisation did not want Laurie Brereton as leader; he would go on to represent the federal seat of Kingsford Smith, which Carr viewed as his path to federal politics. Thus Carr reluctantly agreed to become Leader of the Opposition, as revealed in his diary entries from the time:

I spent today like a doomed man, taking phone calls and drafting a statement, still saying to the press I wasn't shifting. I feel a jolt in my stomach about what I'm getting myself in for. I will destroy my career in four years. Everything's altered. It's my fate ... So, for better or for worse, I become leader of the party next week.

— Diary notes of Bob Carr in 1988

Despite his misgivings, Carr's performance as Opposition Leader gained approval in the party. Polling in the lead-up to the 1991 election predicted another heavy defeat. However, Labor regained all but one of the seats lost at the previous election. As a result, while the Coalition won 52 per cent of the two-party vote, Labor scored a 10-seat swing and came up only four seats short of Carr becoming Premier. Greiner was forced into a minority government with the support of independents.

In 1992, Greiner resigned following adverse findings against him from the Independent Commission Against Corruption. John Fahey replaced him as premier, but was hampered by his need to negotiate with independents. For the 1995 election, Carr focused the campaign on a select group of key seats. At that election, Labor took three seats off the Coalition, allowing Carr to become premier with a bare majority of one seat.

In 1992, federal Liberal leader John Hewson controversially attacked Carr for his lack of family life when compared to Fahey: "You've got to be suspicious of a guy that doesn't drive, doesn't like kids and things like that. When he's up against a full-blooded Australian like John Fahey, he hasn't got a hope", but was later forced to withdraw his remarks.

Bob and Helena Carr did not respond to Hewson's attack. Bob Carr however did express his frustration with the Hewson attack in his diary:

"What a business to be in where your private life gets blasted all over the media…In the middle of an assault like this one feels crushed; you want to crouch at home; you wonder why friends don’t ring".

For the entirety of his Opposition Leadership, Carr was his own Shadow Treasurer due to Greiner and Fahey being their own Treasurers.

Carr kept Treasury in 1993 when Fahey relinquished Treasury to Peter Collins, but Carr instead assigned Finance spokesman Michael Egan to tackle Collins.

When Carr became Premier after the 1995 election he appointed Egan, not himself, as Treasurer.

=== Premier of New South Wales (1995–2005) ===
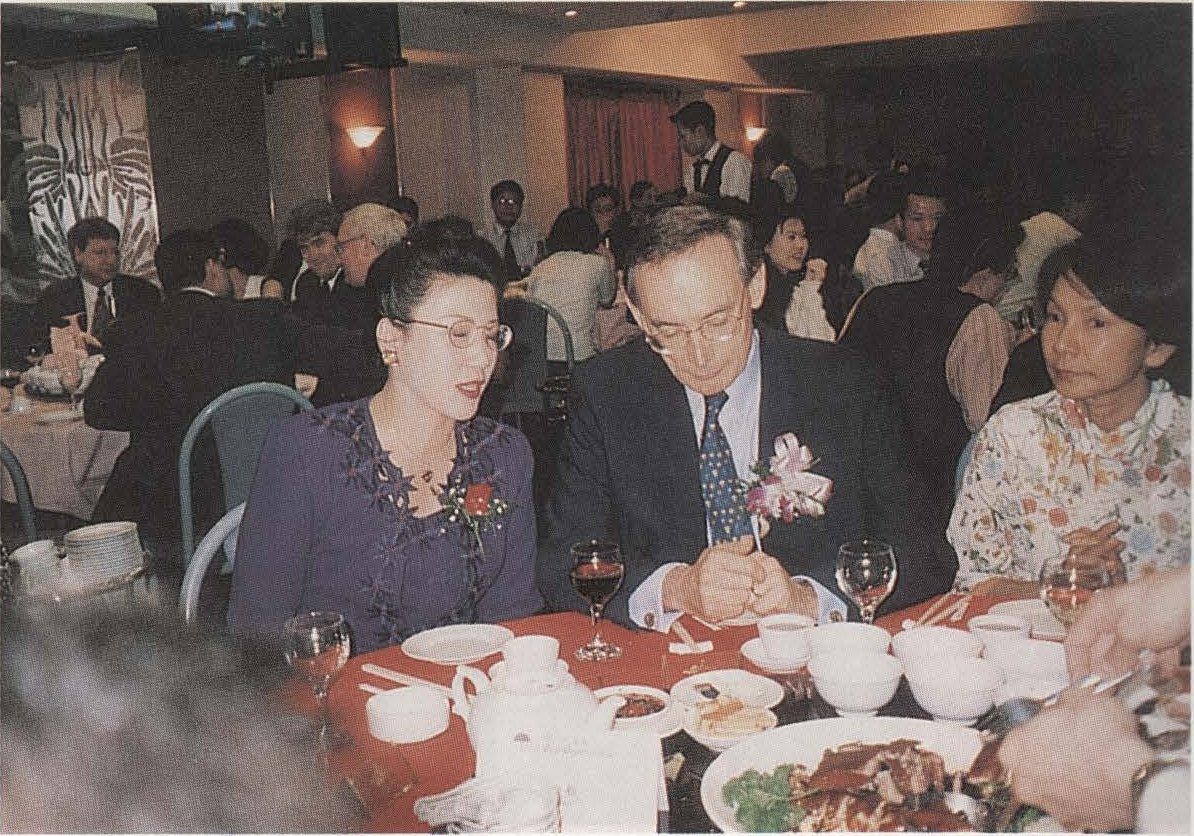
Carr (centre) in 1997

Following the narrow 1995 victory, Labor was re-elected by a much bigger margin in the 1999 poll with 55 seats out of 93. He was re-elected with the same margin in the 2003 election. In the 1999 poll the defeated Liberal opposition leader was Kerry Chikarovski; in the 2003 poll it was John Brogden.

Carr's government was characterised by conservative financial management and to a certain extent the encouragement of market forces, along with a "tough on crime" policy. It was also seen as having a strong pro-environment character and being committed to curriculum rigour (especially history), testing and literacy initiatives in schools. Carr ventured periodically into national policy issues, particularly issues concerning the environment, population growth, embryonic stem cell research, federal–state relations and support for a minimalist model of an Australian Republic. Carr's government, under State Treasurers Michael Egan and Andrew Refshauge, delivered ten consecutive budget surpluses.

Carr became the first Premier who was not his own Treasurer for the entirety of his premiership since Barrie Unsworth.

==== Nature conservation ====
Nature conservation was a priority for the government and for Carr personally. Carr moved to ban canal estates because of their impact on river systems, and when in office he implemented a 1995 election pledge to prevent logging in parts of southeastern NSW by creating the South East Forests National Park along NSW's coastal range from Batemans Bay to the Victorian border.

Carr's election policies had also included commitments to protect 90,000 hectares (220,000 acres) of old-growth forest and wilderness areas through a string of new national parks. The promise was exceeded with gazettal of 120,000 hectares (300,000 acres) between 1995 and 2005. The initiative was supported by a A$6 million forestry restructuring package to build a modern mill and provide a 20-year guarantee of alternative timber.

Following the 1999 victory, Carr's government declared 100 new national parks between Nowra and the Bega Valley. Carr claimed in 2009 that: "rural towns did not 'die' as a result of these conservation measures. The old timber towns now boast communities with a strong economic base, world-class national parks on their doorstep and thriving nature-based tourism". In its first term, the government banned the removal of old-growth vegetation from farmlands and introduced pricing for rural water and an environmental allocation to the state's river systems. In June 2001 jet skis were banned from Sydney Harbour. Carr said: "You wouldn't allow motor bikes in the Botanic Gardens".

The curbs on the clearing of nature vegetation were mounted as a serious anti-greenhouse gas measure, helping Australia achieve its Kyoto targets. In addition, in January 2003 the Carr government launched the world's first greenhouse gas trading scheme, the Greenhouse Gas Reduction Scheme, which set a limit on carbon emissions by electricity retailers. It was listed by the World Bank as the world's first carbon trading scheme.

In 2003 Carr launched the building sustainability index (BASIX) which mandated reductions in energy and water use of up to 40 percent in every new dwelling built after July 2004. Regarding environmental and education improvements, Carr noted in his diary for 21 April 1997: "Yesterday our school reforms were announced. All the ideas I'd formulated in Opposition. Four-unit English for the HSC. Compulsory exams at the end of Year 10. Soft options gone ... I mark the package with forestry. I could leave politics and be satisfied with my achievements."

==== Tort reform ====
During its second term (1999–2003) the Carr government embarked on tort law reform, in a manner that earned Carr a description from Forbes magazine as a "dragon slayer". In 1999, with the cost of many forms of injury insurance increasing, Carr gave his Minister John Della Bosca the task of carrying reforms out. As a consequence, procedures which Carr called "legal rorts" were in many cases stripped from the system. The average price of a green slip (compulsory third party motor accident insurance) was to drop $150 on 1999 prices. Carr argued that this created what he called: "the most comprehensive tort reform that any government has developed ... at the expense of the plaintiff lawyers who had fed on a culture of rorts and rip-offs". Carr noted in his diary: "It's not worth being Premier unless you can take privileges off the undeserving."

However the fact that the law effectively made it impossible to claim for any injury worth less than around $60,000 was criticised by New South Wales Chief Justice James Spigelman and others. Spigelman argued that it effectively "eliminates small claims" entirely, giving "people the right to be negligent and injure someone up to a given level before they become liable". Spigelman said:

The introduction of a requirement that a person be subject to 15 percent of whole of body impairment—a percentage that is lower in some states—before being able to recover general damages has been the subject of controversy. It does mean that some people who are quite seriously injured are not able to sue at all. More than any other factor I envisage this restriction will be seen as much too restrictive.

==== Drug laws ====
As a result of a 1999 drug summit the Carr cabinet introduced Australia's first medically supervised injecting room for heroin users, located in King's Cross. The government argued it was a harm minimisation measure to keep drug users alive until they make the decision to get off drugs. Other reforms included the introduction of drug courts and a voluntary diversion program that allows magistrates to refer offenders to treatment rather than impose prison sentences.

==== Police reform ====
During his time as opposition leader, Carr had backed a motion by independent parliamentarian John Hatton in May 1994 to establish a Royal Commission into corruption in the New South Wales Police. Once installed in the premiership, Carr inherited the work of the Royal Commission and its reports. In November 1996 one of the reports recommended that the government give increased power to the Police Commissioner to hire and fire all staff, random drug and alcohol testing of all police officers, the formation of the police detection commission to detect and audit police corruption. But the recommendations sparked strong objection from the Police Association backed by the Labor Council and demonstrations at parliament house by 1500 police. There was a revolt in Carr's parliamentary party. Carr was adamant that the commissioner must have the increased power if the police force were to be rid of corrupt or compromised officers, and the legislation was passed.

==== Private–public partnerships ====
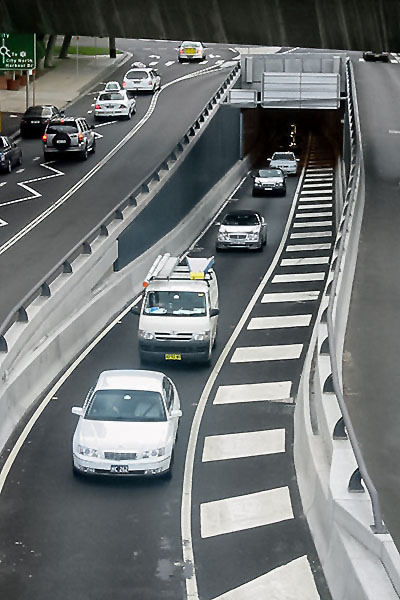
The Cross City Tunnel exit at Sir John Young Crescent.

The Carr Government pioneered private–public partnerships (PPPs) to fund additional infrastructure, creating a model followed in other states. Five projects delivered Sydney a ring road system including the M5 Extension, the Eastern Distributor, the M2 Hills Motorway, the Westlink M7, the Lane Cove Tunnel, and the Cross City Tunnel. These projects had a total cost of A$5.4 billion, while all but $800 million was contributed by the private sector.

According to the press release, in 2007 Infrastructure Partnerships Australia awarded three projects that began under Carr's Premiership as the best PPPs in Australia: the Westlink M7 opened in late 2005; school construction and maintenance which the Auditor-General said had saved tax payers $55 million; and the maintenance of 626 new rail carriages. The focus on roads spending instead of public transport has been criticised as the wrong priority on environmental grounds: "It was clear even then that NSW desperately needed public transport investment."

==== Other matters ====
A year after his appointment as premier, Carr caused controversy when he recommended that the newly appointed New South Wales Governor, Gordon Samuels, not live at Government House, which would become a museum open to the public. This decision was seen by monarchists as an attempt by Carr, a republican, to downgrade the importance of the office of governor.

Carr's government was in power during much of the building of facilities and the conduct of the 2000 Olympic Games. Carr was to boast that the 2000 Olympics were paid in full without a cent in debt.

=== Resignation ===
By March 2004, public support for Carr started to slip; Newspoll showed that for the first time since 1998 more people were dissatisfied than satisfied with the Premier. There was a public view that the government had underspent on urban infrastructure and public transport. Despite a series of announcements and re-announcements of more trains, power stations and a desalination plant, by June 2005, only 35% were satisfied with his performance whereas his dissatisfaction rating had been over 51% since September 2004.

After a decade as Premier, Carr announced his resignation both as Premier and as the Member for Maroubra on 27 July 2005 to be effective from 3 August. His successor as Premier was former Health Minister Morris Iemma. Shortly after Carr's resignation, Andrew Refshauge and Planning Minister Craig Knowles also left parliament.

=== Legacy ===
Retired Premier Neville Wran described Carr as "the very model of a modern Labor premier, an articulate and powerful public performer who identified himself with the contemporary policy issues of education and the environment." Wran noted that the Carr model became a template for other Australian Labor Party leaders, with some regarding him as a mentor.

After Carr the NSW government was able to claim that while in 1994 there were 328 national parks covering four million hectares of NSW, Carr's policies increased this to 770 national parks covering 6.6 million hectares by 2006. Wilderness protection was expanded: there were 650,000 hectares (1,600,000 acres) in 1994, by 2006 nearly two million hectares.

The North Side Sewage Tunnel, funded by the government in its first term, stopped more than 20 billion litres of sewage reaching Sydney Harbour and saw whales and dolphins return to it. The government also built pollution traps to capture litter and rubbish that would have otherwise been flushed with storm water onto Sydney beaches. In 1994, before the election of the government, 430 kilograms (950 lb) of waste was being generated by every Sydney resident each year, and only 60 kilograms (130 lb) being recycled. Reforms to the waste industry saw a 28 percent reduction to 310 kilograms (680 lb) per person and a 65 percent increase in recycling to 102 kilograms (225 lb) per person.

He received credit for the increase in the number and size of the state's national parks, while criticism was made about rail transport which recorded a period of poor on-time running and a damaging industrial dispute in 2004.

The Carr government is also known for its considerable infrastructure contribution. Total State Sector Real Growth from 1995 to 2005 was 41%.

Infrastructure projects completed when Carr was premier included the Eastern Distributor and M5 East, while projects that were under construction when Carr left office included three bus expressways costing $300 million in Western Sydney, Lane Cove Tunnel, Cross City Tunnel, the Epping to Chatswood railway line and the Westlink M7.

== After state politics (2006–2012) ==
After leaving state parliament, Carr continued his involvement in public debate. He championed somatic cell nuclear transfer research—in particular therapeutic cloning—writing in The Daily Telegraph on 24 August 2006: "Therapeutic cloning holds great promise for sufferers of diabetes, Alzheimer's, motor neurone disease and untold other afflictions. [...] Let the doctors and scientists get on with the job. Their research might save a life in your family or mine". In another opinion piece he urged for broader support of embryonic stem cell research, stating that "Human embryonic stem cell research [...] has the most remarkable potential of any scientific discovery ever made in human health."

He continued to advocate nature conservation, for example by calling for national park declarations over the River Red Gums. He wrote in 2009 that the river red gums are "Australian icons, part of our folklore, symbols of inland Australia".

He was an opponent of a charter of rights. Carr wrote in The Australian that, "if the public believed the executive arm of government were stifling freedoms, Australia slipping behind other democracies, there would have been a decided shove towards a human rights act". He continued "Instead…it sunk below the water, not leaving a slick of printer's ink".

Pursuing his interest in literacy he urged an opening of the Australian book market to permit the import of cheaper books.

The rise in the annual immigration intake brought Carr into the debate on what he called 'Australia's carrying capacity'. Carr argued that "The debate is about whether immigration should be running at very high levels. It's about whether we end up with a population of 36 million in 2050 in contrast to the previous expectation of 28.5 million".

Carr took up the issue of obesity and argued that chain restaurants should be forced by law to put calorie measurements next to menu items, that trans fats be banned as in some US states and food manufacturers be made to reduce salt content.

In retirement Carr made speeches at international conferences on climate change, Australia–China relations and multiculturalism.

In October 2005 Carr became a part-time consultant for Macquarie Bank, advising the company on policy, climate change, renewables and strategic issues with a focus on the United States and the People's Republic of China.

Carr continued pursuing his literary interests, interviewing authors and lecturing at the Sydney Writers' Festival. He appeared as a guest reporter for the ABC television show Foreign Correspondent, conducting an interview with friend Gore Vidal. In 2008 he attended the Australia 2020 Summit as part of the economy panel, and raised the issues of an Australian Republic and childhood obesity.

He has been a member of the board of directors at the United States Studies Centre since 2009 and is a charter member of the Chester A. Arthur Society, a US political trivia group named after the US president, 1881–1885. In 2009 he was appointed to the council of Voiceless, the animal protection institute. In 2010 he was appointed Patron of the Sydney Conservatorium of Music Foundation and Patron of the Chifley home, Bathurst.

In April 2013, Fairfax journalist Philip Dorling identified Carr from a searchable database of declassified US State Department diplomatic cables as having criticised the Whitlam Government and provided information on internal Labor Party politics during discussions with the American consul-general in Sydney during the early 1970s. Asked about these contacts with US diplomats, Senator Carr said: "I was in my 20s. I could have said anything."

== Federal politics (2012–2013) ==
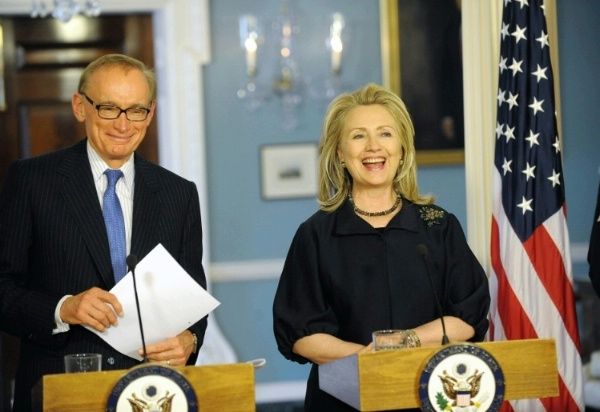
Carr with United States Secretary of State Hillary Clinton in April 2012

On 2 March 2012, Prime Minister Julia Gillard announced that Carr would be nominated to fill a casual vacancy in the Australian Senate caused by the resignation of Mark Arbib. This term would expire on 30 June 2014. Gillard also announced Carr would become the new Minister for Foreign Affairs, succeeding Kevin Rudd. Carr was formally chosen to fill the vacant Senate position by a joint sitting of the NSW Parliament on 6 March 2012. He was sworn as a Senator and Minister for Foreign Affairs on 13 March. Carr confirmed that he would seek election to the Senate for a further full six-year term and was subsequently nominated at the top of Labor's New South Wales Senate ticket for the 2013 poll.

As Foreign Minister, Carr's principal foci were Australia's (successful) bid for a temporary position on the United Nations Security Council, passage of a global arms trade treaty, the Middle East peace process, the conflict in Syria and stronger relations between Australia and the Asia-Pacific particularly Myanmar, Indonesia and Papua New Guinea.

=== United Nations Security Council ===
Carr's term as Foreign Minister coincided with the final stages of Australia's campaign for a UN Security Council seat. The campaign, initiated in 2009, placed Australia in the ballot for a seat in the Western European and Others Group, against European nations Luxembourg and Finland. In the context of the bid, Carr supported Security Council reform including permanent membership for Japan, Brazil and India and two permanent seats for Africa. Carr credited Australia's successful campaign to promotion of Australia's diplomatic links with African nations and environmental and cultural links with small island states in the Caribbean and Pacific. In October 2012, Australia was elected to the Security Council, winning an absolute majority of votes in the first round of balloting – the first time Australia had held a seat since 1985–86. Known for his fastidious eating habits, Bob Carr responded to the suggestion he would celebrate this success with champagne by saying "I’ll be having, as soon as I can, a generous cup of hot water, boiling water, with a slice of lemon".

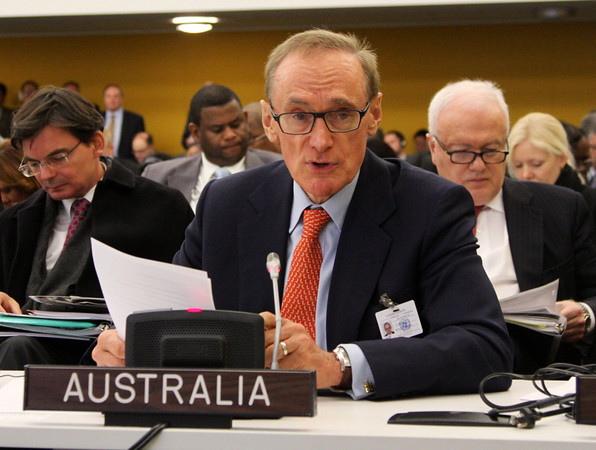
Opening negotiations on an arms trade treaty, United Nations, New York 20 March 2013.

Carr advocated adoption by the UN of a global arms trade treaty to track and reduce the supply of weapons to rogue states or terrorist groups. Carr twice travelled to New York to personally campaign for the treaty. The treaty was passed by the UN by 154 votes to 3.

=== Middle East peace process ===
Carr secured Australian Government support for abstention on a motion before the UN General Assembly to grant observer state status to the Palestinian Authority. This represented a shift from Australia's previous opposition to the motion, championed by then-Prime Minister Julia Gillard. Carr argued that abstention on the motion allowed Australia to "reach out to moderate Palestinians who want a peaceful solution [to conflict with Israel] and say we're not opposing you." The UN motion to grant observer state status for the Palestinian Authority was ultimately carried by 138 votes to nine, with 41 abstentions.

In January 2013, in a joint communique with UK Foreign Secretary William Hague, Carr called for US leadership in resuming direct talks between Israelis and Palestinians. The communique also noted that both countries had voted to abstain on the UN motion on Palestinian status and that both viewed Israeli settlements on the West Bank as illegal under international law.

=== Asia-Pacific ===
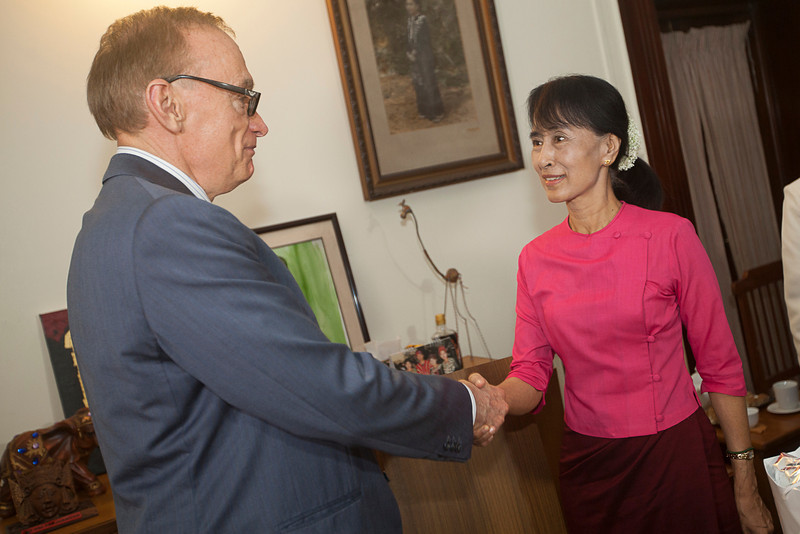
Carr meets Nobel Peace Prize laureate and Myanmar parliamentarian Aung San Suu Kyi in June 2012

Closer to home, Carr worked to build stronger relations with the Association of Southeast Asian Nations (ASEAN), holding in-country talks with all ten member states, twice attending the East Asia Summit and repeatedly emphasizing Australia's interest in regional convergence and co-operation. In 2012 Carr described the health and centrality of ASEAN as critical to Australia's security and prosperity, but warned against ASEAN nations falling into a "middle income trap" of lower growth as a consequence of institutional rigidity and a slowing of internal reform.

Carr also worked to restore global diplomatic relations with Myanmar following the Myanmar Government's release of opposition leader Aung San Suu Kyi and introduction of limited domestic political reform. Australian sanctions on Myanmar were lifted in 2012, though an arms embargo was maintained. Carr lobbied European and United States leaders to follow suit, with the European Union lifting its sanctions April 2013 and the US moving to increase engagement on trade and investment. Carr urged the Myanmar Government to continue its progress towards democracy, while welcoming the release of political prisoners and commitments to address ongoing ethnic and religious violence. He announced a doubling of Australia's foreign aid for Myanmar to $100 million by 2015, with a focus on education and maternal health. A further $9 million was provided to assist the Rohingya and other communities affected by civil conflict in Rakhine State.

Carr visited Indonesia on four occasions as Foreign Minister, raising issues such as people smuggling, aid, education links and trade. As Minister for AusAID, Carr oversaw an increase in assistance to Indonesia, to a total of more than $500 million a year for maternal health and education, and $47 million over 5 years to improve facilities in religious schools.

=== China ===
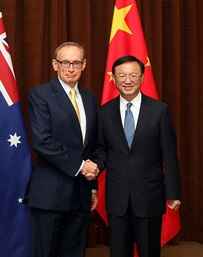
Carr with China's Foreign Minister Yang Jiechi, Beijing, May 2012

Engagement with China was the subject of Carr's first substantive speech in the role. Speaking to the CSIS Banyan Tree Leadership Forum in April 2012, Carr argued that China's economic and cultural expansion was not new. Rather it was "a return to the position of strength that China possessed before its decline during the Qing dynasty." Carr highlighted the sacrifices made by the Chinese people in achieving independence and noted the rapid pace of Chinese industrial growth:

It's a faster industrialisation and on a bigger scale than that of America itself in the 19th century. It happened faster, more people are affected, more dramatic effects for the world than even America's rise to industrial dominance. ... Few could be untouched by what it means for the Chinese people – liberated from poverty, historic poverty; few could be reluctant to see this renewed China take its place in the councils of the world.

On the first of three visits to China in May 2012 Carr faced questions from Foreign Minister Yang Jiechi who expressed concern about Australia's blocking of Huawei Technologies in its bid to supply equipment for the National Broadband Network, and about the November 2011 decision to have US Marines rotationally deployed in Darwin. Carr responded that the Huawei decision reflected Australia's right to make decisions on the resilience and security of its infrastructure. He argued Australia had a welcoming approach to Chinese investment, pointing to its 20-fold increase over the preceding five years and to 380 individual proposals from Chinese firms that had been approved in Australia since 2007. He argued the Marines presence reflected Australia's long-term Australian security relationships:

"Australia has had a small population, vast distances, a desire for great and powerful friends, and a sense of exposure to its north ever since Japan defeated Russia in 1905 and Alfred Deakin looked for support (from the US)."

Carr returned to China with Prime Minister Gillard in April 2013 for the annual Boao Forum for Asia, with a focus on strengthening bilateral relations. The Chinese Government agreed to the direct convertibility of Australian currency into yuan - only the third such agreement in China's history. Gillard and Carr also secured agreements for an annual leadership dialogue with their Chinese counterparts. China's President Xi Jinping was reported as intending to lift Australia–China relations "to a new level" following Forum discussions.

In a speech following the visit, Carr said Australia's achievements at the Forum had been to create the bilateral architecture needed to support future Australia–China relations - annual leaders and foreign minister's talks, and an ongoing economic dialogue between Australia's trade and competitiveness ministers and the chairman of China's National Development and Reform Commission. Carr praised China's leadership for being "determined, confident and pragmatic" about the continued economic and geopolitical rise of their country.

His third visit, in July 2013, was to open Australia's fourth diplomatic post in China, a consulate-general in the Sichuan provincial capital of Chengdu. At the opening Carr emphasised trade issues, highlighting Chinese investment in Australia and saying the new consulate would assist Australian firms in establishing a presence in western China.

=== G20 ===
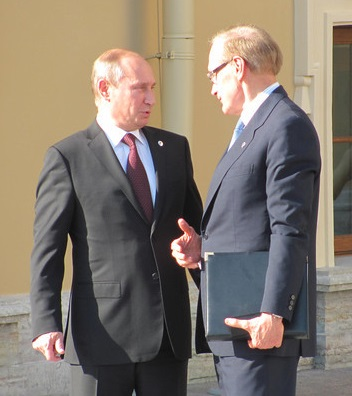
President Putin with Carr, G20, St Petersburg, September 2013.

Carr also represented Australia at the 2013 G20 Saint Petersburg summit, standing in for prime minister Kevin Rudd, due to the pending 2013 federal election. His G20 interventions included as a member of a panel comprising Russian business and international labour, and in a leader's debate on chemical weapons in Syria. At a sideline meeting convened by UK Prime Minister David Cameron, Carr also secured international agreement on a medical pact in Syria to protect hospitals and health care workers from targeted attacks and to maintain humanitarian access for medical NGO's and for the distribution of aid.

=== Syria ===
Carr's "medical plan" for Syria became an issue he pursued in international fora. The plan aimed to use international pressure to force an informal agreement between all parties in the Syrian civil war, to end the targeting of hospital or medical personnel, avoid the use of hospitals as bases and ensure the safe distribution of civilian medical aid. Speaking after Australia's successful push for the UN Security Council position in 2012, Carr said the plan represented his first priority in its new United Nations role. Australia's foreign aid for the Syrian crisis was increased to more than $100 million, focusing on shelter, medical support and child protection for refugees fleeing to Jordan, Lebanon and Turkey.

In the absence of a ceasefire or UNSC action on Syria, Carr's plan received international support including from US Secretary of State Hillary Clinton, the Arab League and leaders at the 2013 G20 Summit.

=== Resignation ===
On 23 October 2013, six weeks after Labor lost the federal election, Carr announced his resignation from the Senate, which took effect the following day. He was replaced by Deborah O'Neill on 13 November 2013.

As Carr had been elected to the Senate for a six-year term to commence 1 July 2014, the timing of his resignation created a constitutional quirk, as he was resigning both his current term and a subsequent term that had not yet commenced. To resolve this, O'Neill had to be re-appointed to the Senate by the New South Wales Parliament after the commencement of the 2014–2020 Senate term. To mitigate the cost of recalling both houses of the parliament for a joint sitting (estimated at AUD $300,000), Premier Mike Baird convened a sitting on 2 July of two government members and two opposition members before the President of the Legislative Council to appoint O'Neill to the Senate for the term which began on 1 July.

== Later activities ==
=== Roles ===
After his resignation, Carr accepted the position of director of the Australia-China Relations Institute at the University of Technology Sydney (UTS) and a professorial fellowship with the University of Sydney Southeast Asia Centre as a Professorial Fellow. In May 2014 he became head of the Australia-China Relations Institute, a think-tank at UTS established with a donation from Huang Xiangmo, a Chinese billionaire with links to the Chinese Communist Party. As of 2019, Carr is no longer affiliated with the Australia-China Relations Institute. As of 2025, Carr is currently a professor in international relations at UTS.

Carr was appointed chair of the Australian Heritage Council by the Albanese government in July 2024. He has also been appointed to several roles by the Minns government, including chair of Museums of History NSW in December 2024 and a three-year term as a director of Sydney Water in November 2025.

=== Commentary and activism ===
Carr has been a long time campaigner against high immigration. Since leaving politics he has campaigned on cutting immigration numbers. Carr is also an advocate for the release of Julian Assange.

On 2 May 2024, New Zealand Foreign Affairs minister Winston Peters made comments on Radio New Zealand's Morning Report about Carr and his criticism of AUKUS, which Carr subsequently described as "entirely defamatory". Carr announced the same day he would sue Peters for libel.

In August 2025, Carr attended the March for Humanity in Sydney, a large protest highlighting the plight of Palestinians in the Gaza conflict.

In September 2025, Carr traveled to the 2025 China Victory Day Parade.

== Publications ==
Carr is the author of several books, including Thoughtlines (Viking, 2002), My Reading Life (Penguin, 2008), and Diary of a Foreign Minister (2014), the latter of which received a mixed reception.

In May 2003, author Marilyn Dodkin authored a biography, Bob Carr: the reluctant leader, partly based on Carr's private diaries and including his often uncomplimentary thoughts on various political personalities. A second biography, Bob Carr: A Self-Made Man, by Andrew West and Rachel Morris, was published in September 2003 by HarperCollins.

Carr participated in the 2004 Sydney Festival in conversation with Sir Tom Stoppard.

In March 2026, Carr released an account of the loss of his wife Helena, titled Bring Back Yesterday, appearing to discuss the book at the 2026 Byron Writers Festival.

== Awards ==
For his work in improving Australia–US relations he was awarded a Fulbright Distinguished Fellow Award Scholarship. He donated the prize money to launch scholarships for the State's teachers to complete studies abroad. For his services to conservation he was given the World Conservation Union International Parks Merit Award and made a life member of the Wilderness Society.

In 2008 he was awarded the Cavaliere di Gran Croce Ordine al Merito della Repubblica Italiana (Knight Grand Cross of the Order of Merit of the Italian Republic), the second of five grades of the order, in recognition of his services to Italian culture.

== See also ==
- Second Gillard ministry
- Second Rudd ministry

== Notes ==
New South Wales Legislative Assembly
Preceded by Bill Haigh	Member for Maroubra; 1983–2005	Succeeded by Michael Daley
Political offices
Preceded by Terry Sheahan	Minister for Planning and Environment; 1984–1988	Succeeded by David Hay as Minister for Planning
Preceded by Terry Sheahan	Minister for Planning and Environment; 1984–1988	Succeeded by Tim Moore as Minister for the Environment
Preceded by George Paciullo	Minister for Consumer Affairs; 1986	Succeeded by Deirdre Grusovin
New office	Minister for Heritage; 1986–1988	Vacant Title next held by Robyn Parker
Preceded by Nick Greiner	Leader of the Opposition in New South Wales; 1988–1995	Succeeded by Peter Collins
Preceded by John Fahey	Premier of New South Wales; 1995–2005	Succeeded by Morris Iemma
Preceded by Peter Collins	Minister for the Arts; 1995–2005	Succeeded by Bob Debus
Preceded by Michael Photios as Minister for Multicultural and Ethnic Affairs	Minister for Ethnic Affairs; 1995–1999	Succeeded by Himself as Minister for Citizenship
Preceded by Himself as Minister for Ethnic Affairs	Minister for Citizenship; 1999–2005	Succeeded by Morris Iemma
Party political offices
Preceded by Barrie Unsworth	Leader of the New South Wales Labor Party; 1988–2005	Succeeded by Morris Iemma
Parliament of Australia
Preceded by Mark Arbib	Senator for New South Wales; 2012–2013	Succeeded by Deborah O'Neill
Political offices
Preceded by Kevin Rudd	Minister for Foreign Affairs; 2012–2013	Succeeded by Julie Bishop
